= Adventure in the Hopfields =

1954 British film by John Guillermin

- Directed by: John Guillermin
- Written by: John Cresswell
- Based on: The Hop Dog by Nora Lavrin and Molly Thorp
- Produced by: Roger Proudlock
- Starring: Mandy Miller; Mona Washbourne; Dandy Nichols
- Cinematography: Ken Talbot
- Edited by: Sam Simmonds
- Music by: Ronald Binge; Philip Martell
- Production company: Vandyke Productions
- Distributed by: CFF
- Release date: 1954
- Running time: 60 minutes
- Country: United Kingdom
- Language: English

Adventure in the Hopfields is a 1954 British children's film directed by John Guillermin and starring Mandy Miller. It was written by John Cresswell based on the 1952 novel The Hop Dog by Nora Lavrin and Molly Thorp and was made for the Children's Film Foundation.

== Plot ==
After accidentally smashing her mother's prized china dog, little London girl Jenny Quin leaves her mother a note and sets off from home to make the money to buy a new one by travelling with the family of her friend, Susie Harris, as they set off to go hop picking in Kent.

At the station, Jenny joins the special hop-pickers' train to Goudhurst in Kent, but after failing to join up with the Harris family, she is invited to join Sam Hines and his family. After the first day of hop picking, Sam takes her with him to an antiques shop in Goudhurst where she sees a china dog just like her mother's. Sam lends her the money to buy it.

Meanwhile, when Jenny's attempt to send a letter to her parents telling them where she is fails to reach them, her parents report her as missing to the police. When they eventually track her down at the hop-pickers' camp, her parents set out to go to her.

Mr. and Mrs. Quin arrive during a hop wedding, when all are distracted, and the dog is stolen by two local children – the Reilly boys – untidy Artful Dodger style characters who disparagingly call the hop-pickers "hoppers". Jenny chases after the two boys into an old windmill, but they trick her and seal her in the upper area by taking away the ladder. When lightning strikes the old mill and it catches fire, the Reilly boys run off, but when Pat Reilly sees the mill on fire he returns to help Jenny escape, but she leaves the china dog inside. Ned re-enters the burning mill to rescue the dog and returns it to Jenny, but she doesn't even say "Thank you", so he grabs the hose from the fire engine which has attended to extinguish the fire and squirts water over Jenny and her parents and friends.

== Cast ==
- Mandy Miller as Jenny Quin
- Hilda Fenemore as Mrs. Quin
- Russell Waters as Mr. Quin
- Harold Lang as Sam Hines
- Melvyn Hayes as Ned Reilly
- Leon Garcia as Pat Reilly
- Mona Washbourne as Mrs McBain
- June Rodney as Laura McBain
- Micky Maguire as George McBain
- Janice Field as Lucy McBain
- Dandy Nichols as Mrs. Harris
- Molly Osborne as Susie Harris
- Barry Martin as Frankie Harris
- Phyllis Morris as Mrs. Bligh
- Len Sharp as China Mender
- Wallas Eaton as Junk Shop Owner

== Production ==
Various filming locations were used in London, while Triggs Farm near Goudhurst in Kent was the main location for filming of the scenes at Longrope Camp where the hop-pickers stay. Goudhurst High Street and St Mary the Virgin Church appear in various scenes. Also featured are the now-demolished Goudhurst Railway Station and Jill Windmill, above the village of Clayton, West Sussex.

== Critical reception ==
The Monthly Film Bulletin said "the production is modest, but the sets are good and the locations well chosen... rates with Johnny on the Run as one of the most successful of CFF's productions to date."

TV Guide gave the film two out of four stars, noting "An above average children's film, with believable characters and story."

The Radio Times rated it two out of five stars, writing, "In days of yore, the poor folk of South London flocked to Kent and went hop-picking ... this exciting tale offers bullying, theft and a climactic lightning storm. A little piece of British social history from the future director of The Towering Inferno."

FilmInk called it " a decent, brisk, efficient movie ... No one seems to bat an eye as she [Mandy Miller] gets on a train and then goes to work – what was the labor market like in 1954 England?"

== Rediscovery ==
In 2002, a copy of Adventure in the Hopfields was discovered in a rubbish bin in Chicago, and subsequently purchased by film buff Barry Littlechild for $35. The film was screened at the village hall in Goudhurst, near the filming locations, on 8 March 2002. It has since become available on DVD on specialist sites. It was shown on Talking Pictures TV in 2021.
