= Two on the Tiles =

- British quad poster
- Directed by: John Guillermin
- Written by: Alec Coppel
- Produced by: Nigel Proudlock; Roger Proudlock
- Starring: Herbert Lom; Hugh McDermott; Brenda Bruce; Ingeborg von Kusserow; Humphrey Lestocq
- Cinematography: Ray Elton
- Edited by: Robert Jordan Hill
- Music by: Frank Spencer
- Production company: Vandyke Productions
- Distributed by: Grand National Pictures (UK)
- Release date: September 1951 (UK)
- Running time: 73 minutes
- Country: United Kingdom
- Language: English

Two on the Tiles (also known as School for Wives; U.S. title: School for Brides.) is a 1951 British comedy film directed by John Guillermin and starring Herbert Lom, Hugh McDermott and Brenda Bruce. It was produced by Nigel and Roger Proudlock and written by Alec Coppel.

== Synopsis ==
A married couple, Dick and Janet Lawson, both face temptations while separated for a few days. Dick meets Madeleine, an attractive female fellow-traveller in Paris while Janet accidentally spends a night aboard a Royal Navy ship with Jimmy Bradley, a male friend after she is stranded following a party. Despite knowing the essential innocence of both husband and wife, their sinister new butler, Ford, uses information about their escapades to demand blackmail payments.

== Cast ==
- Herbert Lom as Ford
- Hugh McDermott as Dick Lawson
- Brenda Bruce as Janet Lawson
- Ingeborg von Kusserow as Madeleine
- Humphrey Lestocq as Jimmy Bradley
- Armand Guinle as Pierre
- Basil Dignam as ship's Captain
- Les Compagnons de la Chanson as themselves
- Hyma Beckley as hotel receptionist

== Production ==
The film was made at Walton Studios by the independent Vandyke Productions for release as a second feature. It was one of three back-to-back productions Guillermin directed for the company at Walton Studios, along with Smart Alec and Four Days.

== Critical reception ==
The Monthly Film Bulletin wrote: "The piece is well acted on the whole and the efforts of Dick and Janet to prevent Ford from giving them away are amusing enough; the material and handling, however, are hackneyed and obvious."

Picturegoer wrote: "Hugh McDermott and Humphrey Lestocq show they are excellent comedians – for the theatre. Brenda Bruce works hard, but the photography in close-ups doesn't help her much. Ironically, the only one with a light touch is the blackmailing butler, as played by Lom."

TV Guide gave the film two out of five stars, calling it an "innocuous comedy," but also finding it "enjoyable."

== Bibliography ==
- Chibnall, Steve & McFarlane, Brian. The British 'B' Film. Palgrave MacMillan, 2009.
