= Robert Jordan Hill =

British film director, writer, editor and producer

Robert Jordan Hill was a British director, writer, editor and producer of films. He had a partnership with John Guillermin for a time.

== Filmography ==
Year	Name	Director	Producer	Writer	Editor	Composer	Notes
1940	The Tale of a Dog	Yes	Yes	Yes	Yes	Yes	Short
1949	Bless 'Em All	Yes	Yes	No	Yes	No	
1949	Melody in the Dark	Yes	Yes	Yes	No	Yes	Co-written with John Guillermin
1949	The Nitwits on Parade	Yes	No	No	Yes	No	
1949	High Jinks in Society	Yes	Yes	Yes	Yes	No	Co-directed and co-written with John Guillermin
1950	Torment	No	Yes	No	Yes	No	Directed by John Guillermin
1951	The Kilties Are Coming	Yes	Yes	Yes	No	No	Documentary

Only Editor
Year	Name	Director(s)	Notes
1945	Song of the People	Maxwell Munden	Documentary short
1947	Swiss Honeymoon	Henry C. James & Jan Sikorski	
1947	Comin' Thro the Rye	Walter C. Mycroft	
1951	Smart Alec	John Guillermin	
1951	Two on the Tiles	John Guillermin	
1951	Four Days	John Guillermin	
1952	Song of Paris	John Guillermin	
1953	The Blue Parrot	John Harlow	
1954	What Every Woman Wants	Maurice Elvey	
1954	The Happiness of Three Women	Maurice Elvey	
1955	Room in the House	Maurice Elvey	
1955	Fun at St Fanny's	Maurice Elvey	
1955	You Lucky People	Maurice Elvey	
1956	Stars in Your Eyes	Maurice Elvey	
1957	Suspended Alibi	Alfred Shaughnessy	
1957	Booby Trap	Henry Cass	
1960	Man Who Couldn't Walk	Henry Cass	
1960	The Hand	Henry Cass	
1961	The Monster of Highgate Ponds	Alberto Cavalcanti	
1961	Murder in Eden	Max Varnel	
1961	Man Detained	Robert Tronson	
1961	A Question of Suspense	Max Varnel	
1961–1962	Edgar Wallace Mystery Theatre	Robert Tronson / Gordon Flemyng	Episodes ''Man Detained' and ''Solo for Sparrow''
1962	Solo for Sparrow	Gordon Flemyng	
1963	Take Me Over	Robert Lynn	
1965	Mr. Brown Comes Down the Hill	Henry Cass	
1966	The Ghost of Monk's Island	Jan Darnley-Smith & Jeremy Summers	
