= Strange Stories (film) =

1953 film by Don Chaffey

- Directed by: Don Chaffey; John Guillermin
- Screenplay by: Jerome Lawrence; Robert E. Lee
- Based on: "Bartleby, the Scrivener" by Herman Melville "The Saloon Passenger" by E. W. Hornung
- Produced by: Roger Proudlock
- Starring: John Slater; Valentine Dyall
- Cinematography: Arthur Grant; S.D. Onions
- Edited by: Connie Mason; Sam Simmonds
- Production company: Vandyke Productions
- Distributed by: Archway Film Distributors
- Release date: 1953
- Running time: 45 minutes
- Country: United Kingdom
- Language: English

Strange Stories is a 1953 British drama film directed by Don Chaffey and John Guillermin and starring Peter Bull, Naomi Chance and Valentine Dyall.

It comprises two separate stories, "The Strange Mr. Bartleby", based on Herman Melville's Bartleby, the Scrivener, and "The Strange Journey", based on The Saloon Passenger by E.W. Hornung. The stories were sometimes shown individually on television.

== Plot ==
The first tale, "The Strange Mr. Bartleby", is set in Victorian London. A woman asks a solicitor to find a man called Zwane. They find a vagrant named Bartleby, who turns out to be Zwane, the girl's long-lost father. Father and daughter are reunited before Zwane dies.

In the second story, "Strange Journey", Charles Kellerton steals money from his employer, and in trying to return it, accidentally kills him. Kellerton assumes the victim's identity and escapes on a steam ship bound for Tasmania. Under the impression that Breen, the captain of the ship knows his secret, when police board the vessel to investigate a suspected outbreak of disease, Kellerton confesses to his crimes.

== Cast ==
- Peter Bull as Captain Breen
- Naomi Chance as Young Woman
- Valentine Dyall as Storyteller
- Helen Horton as Marie
- John Laurie as Mr. Bartleby
- Norman Shelley as Mr. Gilkie
- John Slater as Storyteller
- Colin Tapley as Charles Kellerton

== Reception ==
The Monthly Film Bulletin wrote: "The framework in which these stories are presented is artificial, and, while the stories themselves are adequately narrated, they scarcely convey either the suspense or the macabre atmosphere that they seem to be attempting."

Kine Weekly wrote: "The picture doubles its chances of success by cramming two yarns into its featurette footage, and as things turn out the neat latter cameo partly atones for the slightly rambling and outmoded former. The cast is on the whole satisfactory, but John Slater and Valentine Dyall are wasted as narrators. Short, if not entirely valid, the overall should, nevertheless, register with most audiences."

== Bibliography ==
- James Monaco. The Encyclopedia of Film. Perigee Books, 1991.
