= Proudlock =

Proudlock may refer to:

== People ==
- Adam Proudlock, footballer
- Ethel Proudlock, murderer
- Oliver Proudlock, cast member of Made in Chelsea
- Roger Proudlock (1920–2003), a British film producer
- Nigel Proudlock, co-founded VanDyke Productions with brother Roger. Grandfather of Oliver.

== Other ==
- Proudlock House and Home, a shop in Alnwick, UK
