= Smart Alec (1951 British film) =

1951 British film by John Guillermin

- Opening titles
- Directed by: John Guillermin
- Written by: Alec Coppel
- Based on: Mr Smart Guy by Alec Coppel
- Produced by: Roger Proudlock
- Starring: Peter Reynolds; Leslie Dwyer
- Cinematography: Ray Elton
- Edited by: Robert Jordan Hill
- Production company: Vandyke Productions
- Distributed by: Grand National Pictures (U.K.)
- Release date: March 1951 (U.K.)
- Running time: 58 minutes
- Country: United Kingdom
- Language: English

Smart Alec is a 1951 British crime film directed by John Guillermin and starring Peter Reynolds. The screenplay was by Alec Coppel, based on his 1941 play Mr Smart Guy.

== Plot ==
Young Alec Albion plans to kill his rich uncle Edward "Eddie" Hale. He sets himself up in an apartment overlooking Eddie's and carefully times himself going from one room to another by use of a particular music record. He has a new young wife, Judith, but is visited in the flat by Sylvia, a woman with whom he is obviously on intimate terms. Judith sees Sylvia coming from the direction of their flat, but Alec lies that she had accidentally come to the wrong door.

Alec arranges an alibi by having the new chief commissioner of police, Sir Randolph Towle, who lives in the same building, as his chief witness. He invites Sir Randolph over for tea and tells him he has had a premonition about his uncle's murder. Alec asks him to look out of the window to see if his uncle is in his favourite spot on a hot day like this, sitting on his balcony, and Sir Randolph confirms that he is. Alec puts the record on the turntable, with the volume turned up, then goes into the other room. The murder is committed, and the body is soon found by the maid. Sir Randolph confirms Alec's statement that he was only out of the room for a few seconds, which is time enough for him to have shot his uncle from the window. However, the police surgeon finds no bullet in the body or in the room, and Sir Randolph's testimony proves that Alec did not have enough time to go to his uncle's flat and kill him. The police find a hidden gun, which Alec claims he hid because he didn't have a license, but since there is no bullet, they cannot prove that this is the murder weapon. Alec then adds another layer to his alibi by revealing that Judith was in a large cupboard throughout his conversation with the commissioner, which she, a secretary, took down in shorthand. He says he asked her to do this because he was worried about Sir Randolph's reaction to his premonition. Uncle Eddie's friend and lawyer tells them that Eddie was going to make a new will the next day, disinheriting Alec. The commissioner and the investigating police officers are convinced that Alec committed the murder, and the commissioner insists that they charge him, ignoring the inspector's wish to continue his investigations first, as he believes that a jury will find him not guilty on the evidence they now have.

As the inspector feared, Alec is found not guilty, and he leaves the court a free man. A puzzled and anxious Judith sees her husband with the mysterious Sylvia again. Alec sends Judith off on a trip, saying he'll soon follow her, but then makes arrangements with Sylvia for them to go off together.

But first, Alec calls Sir Randolph, the police inspector and sergeant, and Uncle Eddie's lawyer to the flat, and is surprised when Judith also turns up. He proceeds to demonstrate how he committed the murder. He used a bullet made of ice, which, on that hot day, had melted by the time Eddie was examined. He boasts that since he has been found not guilty of killing Eddie, he can openly admit to the murder and the law cannot touch him. The inspector asks him to load the gun with more ice bullets and go to the window to show them how he did it. Alec eagerly agrees, but is shocked to see Uncle Eddie sitting on the balcony. Eddie tells them that the day before the murder, his twin brother, who lives in Canada, had arrived, and Eddie offered his brother the use of his flat while he was away. When he heard that Alec was to be charged with his murder, Eddie felt that his crafty nephew would get off, and planned this re-emergence in order to catch the murderer. Now, Alec will be arrested for murdering his other uncle, using evidence he has himself given.

Alec grabs the gun, and threatens the assembled people. He calls Judith over and tells her to hold the others using the gun while he escapes. Judith takes the gun, but she has finally realised that Alec only married her to aid with his alibi. To his astonishment, she fires the gun at him, wounding him slightly. He quickly locks the door, and makes a run for it. The police break down the door and follow. Alec tries to escape in his car, but had forgotten that the flats' porter had the keys, and starts to run through the streets, with the police in pursuit. They soon catch him, and as he is taken away by the police, a sad Judith says "Any message for Sylvia?"

== Cast ==
- Peter Reynolds as Alec Albion
- Leslie Dwyer as Gossage
- Edward Lexy as Inspector Ashley
- Kynaston Reeves as Sir Randolph Towle
- Charles Hawtrey as Farr
- Mercy Haystead as Judith Albion
- Frederick Morant as Edward Hale
- David Hurst as Poppi
- David Keir as Mr. Guppy
- Annette D. Simmonds as Sylvia
- Vernon Smythe as judge
- Peter Bull as prosecuting counsel
- Basil Dignam as defending counsel

== Production ==
Film rights to the play Mr Smart Guy were bought by Vandyke Productions, a short-lived production company founded by brothers Roger and Nigel Proudlock that specialised in low budget pictures.Alec Coppel made some changes to the play in adapting it including adding another female part, Sylvia. The film was shot at Nettlefold Studios, Walton-on-Thames in Surrey. It was filmed back to back with Two on the Tiles (1951) and Four Days (1951).

== Reception ==
The Monthly Film Bulletin wrote: "In this comedy thriller the absurdity and naiveté of the story is far surpassed by that of the acting."

FilmInk said "The film is only 55 minutes and is a little silly, but races along. Guillermin does an outstanding job as director, keeping things pacy and brisk; actors are always moving around, the low budget is covered by keeping the action in a few rooms or doing it via close ups (e.g., the trial sequence) and there's a neat final shot with a camera on a car (or something pulling away)."
