= The Second Mrs Tanqueray (1952 film) =

1952 film

- Directed by: Dallas Bower
- Written by: Arthur Wing Pinero (play)
- Produced by: Roger Proudlock
- Starring: Pamela Brown; Hugh Sinclair; Ronald Ward
- Cinematography: Gerald Gibbs
- Edited by: Sam Simmonds
- Production company: Vandyke Picture Corporation
- Distributed by: Associated British-Pathé (UK)
- Release date: December 1952 (UK)
- Running time: 75 minutes
- Country: England

The Second Mrs Tanqueray is a 1952 British second feature ('B') drama film directed by Dallas Bower and starring Pamela Brown, Hugh Sinclair and Ronald Ward. It was written by Sir Arthur Wing Pinero based on his 1893 play The Second Mrs Tanqueray and marked the film debut of Virginia McKenna.

== Plot ==
Well-off widower Aubrey Tanqueray falls in love with Paula, and despite warnings from others about her character and past, they marry. It is an unhappy marriage, with Paula bored and Aubrey worried about his wife's reputation. When Aubrey's daughter's fiancé turns out to be one of Paula's ex-lovers, Paula commits suicide.

== Cast ==
- Pamela Brown as Paula Tanqueray
- Hugh Sinclair as Aubrey Tanqueray
- Ronald Ward as Cayley Drummie
- Virginia McKenna as Ellean Tanqueray
- Andrew Osborn as Captain Ardale
- Mary Hinton as Mrs Cortelyon
- Peter Haddon as Sir George Orreyed
- Peter Bull as Misquith
- Bruce Seton as Gordon Jayne

== Critical reception ==
The Monthly Film Bulletin wrote: "Apart from a few cuts, which perhaps would not be practicable if the cameras had never ceased to turn, there is nothing to differentiate his film from a drama mounted adequately but without great flair for television. The limitations of the genre are immediately apparent: flat and unflattering lighting, utility sets (there are only two), a rushed tempo, no visual expressiveness whatever, and unmistakably harassed playing. At first – and particularly before the entrance of Pamela Brown – one fears the worst. And indeed, without Miss Brown's admittedly ragged but none the less vibrant performance, and without the excellent writing and structure of Pinero's play, the film would have been a dismal affair. But these two advantages lift it to the level of tolerable entertainment: interest in fact is germinated as the clever tangle of the plot unravels itself, and one is left with the reflection that, in all except the higher reaches of the art,a thoroughly welldevised and well-written script, interpreted by actors of skill and vigour, will make better entertainment in the cinema than skilful technique and expensive decoration lavished on subjects devoid of originality or interest."

Kine Weekly wrote: "Gaslight society melodrama, literally translated from Arthur W. Pinero's famous Edwardian stage hit. ... it talks itself to a standstill long before it consents to lie down. Outmoded and stilted, Museum piece."

TV Guide rated the film two out of four stars, and wrote "While overly melodramatic (making Douglas Sirk look like a documentarian), this one does have its moments".

In British Sound Films: The Studio Years 1928–1959 David Quinlan rated the film as "mediocre", writing: "Well-written but now completely outdated piece."
