= The Six Men =

1951 British film by Michael Law

- Opening titles
- Directed by: Michael Law
- Written by: Reed De Rouen; Richard Eastham; Michael Law; E. Radford; M.A. Radford
- Produced by: Roger Proudlock
- Starring: Harold Warrender; Olga Edwardes; Peter Bull
- Cinematography: S.D. Onions
- Music by: Hans Gunther Stumpf
- Production company: Vandyke Productions
- Distributed by: Eros Films
- Release date: August 1951
- Running time: 65 minutes
- Country: United Kingdom
- Language: English

The Six Men is a 1951 British second feature ('B') crime film directed by Michael Law and starring Harold Warrender, Olga Edwardes and Peter Bull. It was written by Reed De Rouen, Richard Eastham, Michael Law, E. Radford and M.A. Radford.

== Plot ==
Scotland Yard is baffled by a series of crimes committed by a gang known as "The Six Men". Superintendent Holroyd and his assistant Hunter are tasked with bringing the gang to justice.

== Cast ==
- Harold Warrender as Supintendent Holroyd
- Olga Edwardes as Christina Frazer
- Peter Bull as Walkeley
- Avril Angers as herself
- Desmond Jeans as Colonel
- Michael Evans as Hunter
- Ivan Craig as Wainwright
- Reed De Rouen as Lewis
- Christopher Page as Johnny the Kid
- Louis Wiechert as the Mole
- Judith Furse as Captain Emsley
- Michael O'Halloran as Assistant Commissioner
- Macdonald Parke as McGraw

== Production ==
It was made by the independent Vandyke Productions at the Riverside Studios in Hammersmith, with location shooting around London.

== Critical reception ==
The Monthly Film Bulletin wrote: "A story with an unusual twist which should not be divulged. It is not without excitement and is adequately acted and constructed."

In British Sound Films: The Studio Years 1928–1959 David Quinlan rated the film as "mediocre", writing: "Some excitement; actors stoically suffer poor dialogue."
