= The Crowded Day =

1954 British film by John Guillermin

- Theatrical release poster
- Directed by: John Guillermin
- Screenplay by: Talbot Rothwell
- Story by: John Paddy Carstairs; Moie Charles
- Produced by: David Dent
- Starring: John Gregson; Joan Rice; Freda Jackson; Patricia Marmont; Josephine Griffin; Sonia Holm; Patricia Plunkett; Rachel Roberts; Vera Day; Thora Hird; Dora Bryan; Sydney Tafler; Edward Chapman; Cyril Raymond; Sidney James; Brian Oulton; Arthur Hill; Richard Wattis
- Cinematography: Gordon Dines
- Edited by: Max Benedict
- Music by: Edwin Astley
- Color process: Black and white
- Production company: David Dent Productions
- Distributed by: Adelphi Films
- Release date: October 1954
- Running time: 83 minutes
- Country: United Kingdom
- Language: English

The Crowded Day (also known as Tomorrow Is Sunday; USA title: Shop Spoiled) is a 1954 British comedy drama film directed by John Guillermin and starring John Gregson, Joan Rice, Cyril Raymond and Josephine Griffin. The screenplay was by Talbot Rothwell based on a story by John Paddy Carstairs and Moie Charles. The film follows a group of shopgirls working in Bunting and Hobbs, a London department store, during the Christmas shopping season. It was an attempt by Adelphi Films to move into bigger budgeted films. It was the last movie Guillermin directed for the company.

== Plot ==
The Christmas holidays are approaching, and a group of shopgirls head to their jobs at Bunting and Hobbs, a busy London department store. Peggy French is upset at her fiancé, Leslie Randall, because he refuses to sell his vintage car, "Bessie", that takes up all of his time and money. Peggy wants to get married and complains that she doesn't even have an engagement ring. As they head into their respective jobs in the furnishings and estates departments, they quarrel and Peggy breaks off their engagement. She also refuses to let Leslie take her to the staff Christmas party that night and leads him to believe that she has been dating the he very proper personnel manager, Philip Stanton. This is a fib, Mr Stanton is charmed by Peggy, he is not interested in fraternising with any of the shopgirls as that is improper and unprofessional.

Leslie attempts to win Peggy back, but his efforts get him reported by Peggy's supervisor Mr Preedy, who has been making romantic overtures to Peggy despite being a married man and sees Leslie as unwelcome competition for her affections. Leslie also gets reported by his own supervisor after Leslie botches his assignment of showing a house to friends of the store owner, Mr Bunting, because he is distracted by trying to make up with Peggy. Mr Stanton, looking through Leslie's personnel file, sees a report he wrote about promotions and thinks he might transfer Leslie to a higher-paying position in the publicity department. Mr Stanton also gives Leslie's report to Mr Bunting, saying it contains new and useful ideas. Leslie later informs Mr Stanton that he took the ideas for the report out of a book written by Mr Bunting, causing Mr Stanton to worry that he himself will now be sacked for repeating Mr Bunting's own ideas back to him.

Another shopgirl, Yvonne Pascoe, is worried and ill at work. She tells Peggy that she urgently needs to get in touch with her fiancé, Michael Blayburn, who left his mother's home two months ago to look for a job so that he could marry Yvonne. Yvonne has not heard from Michael since he left, and when she tries to telephone his wealthy mother to find out his whereabouts, she is rebuffed. Peggy suggests Yvonne go visit Mrs Blayburn at her home during Yvonne's noontime break from the cosmetics counter. Yvonne does this, but Mrs Blayburn is cold to her and tells her Michael is tired of her and doesn't want to see her or hear from her. When Yvonne confesses she is pregnant with Michael's baby, Mrs Blayburn becomes angry, calls her a "slut" and orders her out of the house. Yvonne is late getting back to work and is reported by Moira, who is annoyed at having to work all alone at the busy cosmetics counter. Mr Stanton meets with Yvonne, learns she is pregnant, and tells her she will have to stop working, although she can have her job back after the baby is born and put up for adoption. He suggests Yvonne visit the welfare office in the meantime, since she has no other family to turn to. Yvonne returns to the cosmetics counter, where she pockets a prescription intended for a customer that contains strychnine and leaves the store. In her hurry to leave, she fails to take an urgent note that a young man left for her at the counter; the note falls on the floor and is trampled by shoppers.

At the staff Christmas party that night, Peggy tries to attach herself to Mr Stanton, interrupting his efforts to socialise with Mr Bunting's homely daughter. Leslie then appears and Mr Bunting calls him over and praises him on his fine report, putting Leslie on track for the well-paying publicity department job. Leslie pays Peggy back for her deception by telling Mr Bunting that he heard Peggy and Mr Stanton were engaged, causing Mr Bunting's daughter to burst into tears. After the party, Peggy learns that Leslie has sold his old car, thus proving that he cares more about her than the car. She happily reunites with him, only to find he has bought an even older car.

Meanwhile, shopgirl Suzy, who dreams of being a film actress, is seduced after the party by her date, a chauffeur who has pretended to be a director and promised her a screen test. Alice, another shopgirl who could not get a date for the party, hires a paid male escort, only to have him tell her at the end of the evening he enjoyed going out with her and the date is free of charge. Eve Carter, a beautiful but mysterious model at the store, is shown to be secretly happily married to (and, it is implied, financially supporting) a man using a wheelchair. She hides her marriage by taking off her wedding ring at work so she will not lose her job.

Yvonne does not attend the party, but wanders the dark streets of London contemplating suicide. At one point she orders tea from a stall and starts to take the strychnine pills, but is interrupted by the menacing sexual advances of a customer at the stall. He chases her through the streets until she finally escapes into a church, where she collapses in tears, but decides not to kill herself. As she walks home past Bunting and Hobbs, she throws the pills into a rubbish bin. The next morning, the watchman finds the note that Yvonne never received, crumpled on the floor. It is from Michael, telling Yvonne that he has got a job, asking her to marry him and saying he will call her the next day.

== Cast ==
This section is sourced from BFI Screenonline.

- Joan Rice as Peggy French
- Josephine Griffin as Yvonne Pascoe
- Freda Jackson as Mrs Morgan
- Patricia Marmont as Eve Carter
- Patricia Plunkett as Alice
- Sonia Holm as Moira
- Vera Day as Suzy
- Rachel Roberts as Maggie
- Joan Hickson as Mrs Jones
- Marianne Stone as Secretary
- Dandy Nichols as Charwoman
- John Gregson as Leslie Randall
- Edward Chapman as Mr Bunting
- Cyril Raymond as Philip Stanton
- Richard Wattis as Mr Christopher
- Brian Oulton as Mr Preedy
- Kynaston Reeves as Mr Ronson
- Roddy Hughes as Chemist
- Hal Osmond as Liftman
- Oscar Quitak as Youth
- Sidney James as Joe
- Thora Hird as Customer
- Dora Bryan as Customer
- Nora Nicholson as Customer
- Sid James as Nightwatchman
- Prunella Scales as Customer
- Mignon O'Doherty as Customer
- Sydney Tafler as Alex
- Mary Hinton as Mrs Blayburn
- Jill Dixon as Maid
- Peter Hammond as Michael Blayburn
- Dorothy Gordon as Miss Bunting
- George Woodbridge as Mr Bunting's Friend
- Totti Truman Taylor as Wife
- Michael Goodliffe as Mr Carter
- Laurie Maine as Customer
- Arthur Hill as Escort
- William Franklyn as Studio Official

== Production ==
In the mid-1950s, Adelphi Films productions were usually considered 'B' pictures that were booked by theatres only as support for main features, or at selected provincial locations. Founder Arthur Dent planned The Crowded Day as a high-quality big-budget feature in hopes of convincing theatres, particularly the Odeon Cinemas and ABC Cinemas, to book the film nationwide throughout the UK as a main feature ('A' picture). To that end, Adelphi subcontracted the popular stars John Gregson and Joan Rice from The Rank Organisation at significant expense, and invested in other aspects of the film. They commissioned a script originally called Shop Soiled.

The film was shot at Nettlefold Studios and on location in London. The Oxford Street department store Bourne & Hollingsworth (renamed "Bunton and Hobbs" for the film) was the setting for the exterior store shots, and also some interior shots as producer David Dent arranged one day's shooting at the store for free. The Tower House was used for exterior shots of Mrs. Blayburn (Mary Hinton)'s mansion. The exterior and interior church scenes were filmed at St Stephen's Church, Westbourne Park.

The film's target audience was women. The storyline involving Yvonne Pascoe (Josephine Griffin), the unmarried, pregnant shopgirl who contemplates suicide, was considered risqué for its time, causing the film to be advertised as "not suitable for children". The Crowded Day marked the first production in which Sid James and Vera Day both appeared. The two would appear together in many more film and television productions over the next decade.

== Reception ==
According to British Film Institute (BFI) fiction film curator Vic Pratt, critics were generally "impressed" with the film, especially with John Guillermin's direction, although some "smirked" at the film's handling of the unwed pregnancy and suicide storyline. However, both Odeon and ABC refused to book it as a first feature due to conflicts with Arthur Dent. In November 1954, it was partially released at a small number of Odeons, but lacking a full circuit release, was unable to recoup its costs.

The Monthly Film Bulletin called it "the usual concoction of confected stories."

Picturegoer wrote: "John Gregson is first-rate as Joan Rice's hapless boy friend. In its photography, acting and sure touch of comedy, this film is admirable. It's on Trouble in Store lines, but there's no trouble in getting laughs here."

Picture Show wrote: "First class film of the trials and tribulations behind the scenes of a big store one day during the Christmas rush. John Gregson and Josephine Griffin give excellent performances and the acting from the rest of the cast is smooth and polished. Briskly directed with Christmas atmosphere, this film should be very popular."

Sight and Sound thought the film produced "evidence of Guillermin's gift (at least during the pre-1965 British years of his career) for bringing fluidly expressive technique to bear on seemingly workaday genre material... Talbot Rothwell's script combines light romantic comedy and engaged social comment (especially sympathetic towards a single sales assistant whose unwanted pregnancy means inevitable redundancy) with a finesse and potency missing from his subsequent Carry On assignments. Guillermin nimbly picks his way through the shifts in tone, while a quality cast... proves impeccable throughout. Beneath the seemingly cosy veneer there's a grown-up drama here about real people and stalled expectations in a country slowly emerging from austerity, and it certainly makes good on Adelphi's ambitions to match the output from Ealing or Rank in quality terms."

FilmInk called it "a decent "three girls" movie... it juggles a number of plots with skill, one of the storylines in particular being particularly dark: Josephine Griffin plays a single girl who gets pregnant, is called a slut, and is almost raped; when her boss discovers she's in the family way, he tells her that she'll have to go away and gives her a home where she can have the baby and says she can have her job back after she's given up her child for adoption."

== Home media ==
In February 2011, BFI Video released The Crowded Day on DVD and Blu-ray, along with the Guillermin-directed film Song of Paris, as "Adelphi Collection Vol. 3".

== See also ==
- List of Christmas films
