= Torment (1950 British film) =

British film by John Guillermin

- Directed by: John Guillermin
- Written by: John Guillermin
- Produced by: John Guillermin; Robert Jordan Hill
- Starring: Dermot Walsh; Rona Anderson; John Bentley
- Cinematography: Gerald Gibbs
- Edited by: Robert Jordan Hill
- Music by: John Wooldridge
- Production company: Advance Productions
- Distributed by: Adelphi Films (UK); Eagle Lion (US)
- Release dates: 3 February 1950 (London UK); 10 November 1950 (US)
- Running time: 68 minutes
- Country: United Kingdom
- Language: English

Torment (U.S. title: Paper Gallows) is a 1950 British second feature thriller film directed and written by John Guillermin and starring Dermot Walsh, Rona Anderson and John Bentley.

It was the first sole director credit for John Guillermin. He later called the film "a lemon".

== Plot ==
Brothers Cliff and Jim Brandon are a successful writing team specializing in murder mysteries, but Cliff and Jim are almost as disturbed as some of the characters they have created. While researching their latest novel, Cliff commits murder, simply to experience the thrill. He then attempts to frame his secretary Joan for the crime. His reason is personal: both brothers are in love with Joan, but she prefers Jim. Jim, the saner of the two brothers, races against time to save Joan from the gallows and to bring Cliff to justice.

== Cast ==
- Dermot Walsh as Cliff Brandon
- Rona Anderson as Joan
- John Bentley as Jim Brandon
- Michael Martin Harvey as Curley Wilson
- Valentine Dunn as Mrs. Crier
- Dilys Laye as Violet Crier

== Production ==
John Guillermin had made several films for Adelphi as a producer. One day, he saw an elaborate set being torn down and offered Adelphi that he would write a film in three weeks and shoot it in three weeks if he could use the set. They agreed. It did take Guillermin three weeks to write it but six weeks to film. He was paid £3,250.

According to one writer, it was with this film that "Guillermin's talent for clear, compact, efficient direction became evident: his tautly-shot thriller remains the strongest crime drama in the Adelphi catalogue."

Dermot Walsh says that during filming, an electrician fell twenty feet from railing down to the floor "but Guillermin wouldn't hold up production, he just went on shooting."

== Release ==
The film was released in the US in March 1951 as Paper Gallows.

The film was rejected for distribution by the main British cinema circuits but Guillermin found the movie useful in launching his career.

== Critical reception ==
The Monthly Film Bulletin wrote: "Cliché-ridden script, overplayed characters, but a feeling once or twice that the director had some elusive Higher Thing in mind."

Kine Weekly wrote: "The picture contains rather a lot of talk during the early stages, but above-average acting and photography enable it to transcend initial shortcomings and gallop to a gripping climax. Cliff's derangement is acceptable, and validity heightens the cleverly thought-out thrills. Exciting theatre, smoothly translated into screen terms, it should keep most audiences on the edge of their seats."

Variety wrote: "Here is a grim, suspenseful thriller devoid of cinematograph tricks but packing a hard entertainment punch. ... It has modest production values and within the scope of its budget is attractively presented."

TV Guide wrote, "the story here is nothing new, but the direction is fresh and original. Taking this simplistic plotline, Guillermin manages to inject some good suspense into a modestly budgeted feature. Walsh, Bentley, and Anderson play their roles well and play against one another with skill."

In British Sound Films: The Studio Years 1928–1959 David Quinlan rated the film as "mediocre", writing: "Hackneyed script, heavy playing: torment for the audience."
