= Bless 'Em All (film) =

1948 British film by Robert Jordan Hill

- Directed by: Robert Jordan Hill
- Written by: Aileen Burke; Leone Stewart; Arthur Dent
- Produced by: Arthur Dent
- Starring: Hal Monty; Max Bygraves; Jack Milroy; Sybil Amiel; Les Ritchie; Stan White; Pat Linova
- Cinematography: S.D. Onions
- Edited by: Robert Jordan Hill
- Music by: John Blore
- Production company: Robert Jordan Hill Productions
- Distributed by: Adelphi Films
- Release date: July 1948
- Running time: 79 minutes
- Country: United Kingdom
- Language: English

Bless 'Em All is a 1948 British musical comedy second feature (B movie) film directed by Robert Jordan Hill and starring Hal Monty and Max Bygraves. It was written by Aileen Burke, Leone Stewart and Arthur Dent. John Guillermin was an associate producer.

== Plot ==
In the Second World War, Skimpy, Tommy and Jock meet at their army call-up medical and are assigned to the same unit. Tommy is soon in trouble with bad-tempered Sergeant Willis. Later Tommy falls for ENSA singer Val, then discovers she has a date with Willis. Posted to France, Skimpy takes a fancy to Lisette, to find that Willis used to be her admirer. Returning to France after the 1940 retreat, the friends meet again.

== Cast ==
- Hal Monty as Skimpy
- Max Bygraves as Tommy
- Jack Milroy as Jock
- Sybil Amiel as Lisette
- Les Ritchie as Sergeant Willis
- Stan White as Corporal
- Pat Linova as Val
- Peter Williams as Doctor

== Production ==
It was the first of two Adelphi Films to star Hal Monty as Skimpy. It was also the screen debut of Max Bygraves.

== Music ==
The film contains the songs "Bless 'Em All", "I'll be Seeing You", "Siegfried Line", "Boom", "All's Well Mademoiselle", "Hi-Di-Hi", "Victory Waltz", "Maggie Cock-A-Bendy", I'm Afraid to Love You" and "What More Can I Say".

== Reception ==
The film appears to have been reasonably popular.

The Monthly Film Bulletin wrote: "The film is a skit on the old Army life, and is extremely funny in the parts which are not too-long-drawn-out. Army entertainments serve to provide the three friends with a reason for doing individual variety acts which are really the best part of the film. Hal Monty's impersonation of a silent film audience is particularly good; but the film as a whole is amateurish and technically below average. Les Ritchie is excellent as the sergeant, but Hal Monty, Max Bygraves and Jack Milroy, as the three friends, are wasted in a badly photographed, sketchy production."

Kine Weekly wrote: "Wildly incoherent but cheery low comedy musical extravaganza, dealing with Army life. Hal Monty, the popular radio and music-hall comic, is given his head and his lively interpretations effectively link the crazy strip of stock gags. A trifle long, but funny for the most part, it's a reliable rib-tickler for the industrial masses."

== Preservation status ==
The film was included on the British Film Institute's 75 Most Wanted list of lost films, with only a two-and-a-half minute trailer known to survive. In 2012, the BFI reported that they had been notified of a cut-down version titled Be Kind Sergeant available on eBay.
