= John Guillermin =

British film director, writer and producer (1925–2015)

- Guillermin in 1970
- Born: Yvon Jean Guillermin; 11 November 1925; London, England
- Died: 27 September 2015 (aged 89); Topanga, California, U.S.
- Education: University of Cambridge
- Occupations: Film director, producer and screenwriter
- Years active: 1947–1988
- Spouses: Maureen Connell (m. 1956–1999) Mary Guillermin (m. 1999–2015)
- Children: 2
- Military career
- Allegiance: United Kingdom
- Branch: Royal Air Force
- Service years: 1942-1947
- Conflicts: World War II

Yvon Jean Guillermin (11 November 1925 – 27 September 2015), known as John Guillermin, was an English film director, writer and producer. Working both in the United Kingdom and the United States, he was most active in big-budget, action-adventure films throughout his lengthy career.

His better-known films include I Was Monty's Double (1958), Tarzan's Greatest Adventure (1959), Never Let Go (1960), Tarzan Goes to India (1962), Waltz of the Toreadors (1962), The Blue Max (1966), The Bridge at Remagen (1969), The Towering Inferno (1974), King Kong (1976), Death on the Nile (1978), Sheena (1984) and King Kong Lives (1986). In the 1980s, he worked on much less prestigious projects, and his final films consisted of lower-budgeted theatrical releases and TV movies.

According to one obituary, "Regardless of whether he was directing a light comedy, war epic or crime drama, Mr. Guillermin had a reputation as an intense, temperamental perfectionist, notorious for screaming at cast and crew alike. His domineering manner often alienated producers and actors...But Mr. Guillermin's impeccable eye and ability to capture both intimate moments and large-scale action scenes usually overcame that reputation."

== Early life ==
Yvon Jean Guillermin was born in London on 11 November 1925. His parents, Joseph and Geneviève, were French. His father worked in the perfume industry. Guillermin remarked in a 1976 interview "I have a British passport but actually I'm a bloody Frog." He grew up in Purley, Surrey ("one of those towns you drive through and never stop at on your way to the coast"), where he attended St Anne's School for Boys. Later he studied at St John's Secondary School For Boys, then for three years at the City of London School.

Guillermin joined the Royal Air Force in 1942 at the age of 17, lying about his age. This involved studying for six months at the University of Cambridge; when he was 18, he became a British citizen. He also studied flying at Falcon Field in Mesa, Arizona. "The war basically saved me," he said later. "It got me away from my mother."

Guillermin wanted to be a director since he had seen Treasure Island at the cinema when he was seven. After mustering out of the Royal Air Force at the age of 22, Guillermin's directorial career began in France with documentary filmmaking, some of which was for the perfume company his father worked for. According to a critical review of Guillermin's work, "One of his stylistic constants, an expert use of handheld camera to add grit and muscle to key scenes, may be rooted in those early efforts, and they function as counterweights to Guillermin's penchant for forceful lines, a very plastic sense of interior spaces, and use of overhead shots...Guillermin's interest in conveying how people and spaces relate to one another and how decisions are reached and carried out suggests a spark to his filmmaking that one might call Griersonian even if the grandfather of British documentary focused on social development and progress as opposed to collapse."

== British films ==
=== Robert Jordan Hill ===
In 1948, Guillermin moved back to London. With Robert Jordan Hill he set up a small production company, Advent Films. Together they made Bless 'Em All (1948) which Guillermin helped produce; it was directed by Hill and featured Max Bygraves in his film debut. Guillermin and Hill then wrote and produced two films starring the cockney character actor Ben Wrigley: Melody in the Dark (1949), directed by Hill, and High Jinks in Society (1949), directed by Hill and Guillermin. Both films were distributed by Adelphi Pictures for whom Guillermin would write and direct Torment (1950), a thriller. He went to Hollywood in 1950 to study film-making methods.

=== Vandyke Productions ===
Guillermin made several movies for the low-budget Vandyke Productions, a company run by Nigel and Roger Proudlock. Two were based on scripts by Alec Coppel, Smart Alec (1951), a thriller starring Peter Reynolds, and Two on the Tiles (1951), a comedy. Also for Vandyke, Guillermin directed Four Days (1951), a thriller with Reynolds, and Song of Paris (1952), a comedy with Dennis Price. Guillermin received an offer from the short-lived Group 3 Films to make Miss Robin Hood (1952), a comedy starring Margaret Rutherford. Back at Vandyke, he codirected Strange Stories (1953) with Don Chaffey. He made episodes of the TV series Your Favorite Story (1953).

Guillermin went to another low-budget outfit, Nettleford, to direct the thriller Operation Diplomat (1953) with Guy Rolfe. This was described as "the first example of prime Guillermin...a 70-minute programmer so tautly directed that every image counts, every detail matters, every actor's movement feels perfectly timed—a true gem." It was followed by Adventure in the Hopfields (1954), made for Vandyke by the Children's Film Foundation, starring Mandy Miller. He also did The Crowded Day (1954), a shop girl melodrama with John Gregson, which was an attempt by Adelphi to enter bigger budgeted filmmaking.

The market for British B films was growing tighter due to competition from television; Guillermin directed episodes of shows such as The Adventures of Aggie (15 TV episodes, 1956–57) and Sailor of Fortune (1957–58). According to the BFI, "it was a modest beginning but he soon hit his stride with a string of films that transcended their meagre budgets to reveal a genuine talent."

=== Maxwell Setton ===
Guillermin returned to features with Thunderstorm (1956), shot in Spain for British Lion starring Carlos Thompson. Two of the (uncredited) producers were Maxwell Setton and Mike Frankovich. Setton hired Guillermin for what would be his breakthrough movie: Town on Trial (1957), starring John Mills as Mike Halloran, a detective investigating a small-town murder. Maureen Connell had a small role; she would soon marry Guillermin. According to the BFI, "Detractors have too often accused Guillermin of being merely a journeyman, lacking any real style of his own. The defence would do worse than to offer Town on Trial as its Exhibit A, drawing particular attention to its breathtaking POV shot of the killer stalking a second victim that anticipates the camera gymnastics of Dario Argento."

Following this, Guillermin announced he would make Insurrection about the 1916 Easter Rising for Carl Foreman based on a story by Liam O'Flaherty. Instead Guillermin made another movie with Mills and Setton, I Was Monty's Double (1958), the story of Operation Copperhead with M. E. Clifton James playing himself; it was made for Associated British. In between the two, Guillermin directed The Whole Truth (1958), a thriller produced by Jack Clayton with Stewart Granger, George Sanders and Donna Reed; it was distributed by Columbia.

=== MGM and Independent Artists ===
Guillermin was hired by producer Sy Weintraub to help re-invigorate the Tarzan series. The result was Tarzan's Greatest Adventure (1959), now regarded as one of the best Tarzan movies. One writer called it "the most relentless and brutal Tarzan film ever made - it's Guillermin's Heart of Darkness". It was followed by a heist film with Aldo Ray and Peter O'Toole, The Day They Robbed the Bank of England (1960), also made for MGM.

Guillermin was hired by Independent Artists to make the crime thriller Never Let Go (1960) with Richard Todd and Peter Sellers; Guillermin also wrote the story. For the same company, Guillermin made Waltz of the Toreadors (1962), based on a Jean Anouilh play, which reunited him with Sellers. The latter was particularly successful at the box office. In between the two movies, Guillermin directed Tarzan Goes to India (1962), another popular Tarzan movie.

=== 20th Century Fox ===
Guns at Batasi (1964) was an adventure-drama set in the last days of British colonialism. It was meant to be made by the Boulting Brothers, but they dropped out, and Guillermin took over. The film, starring Richard Attenborough, was released by 20th Century Fox, whose head of production Darryl F. Zanuck became a fan of Guillermin and signed him for two more films. These were Rapture (1965), shot in France with Melvyn Douglas, and The Blue Max (1966), an expensive aerial epic starring George Peppard and James Mason. Peppard said working with Guillermin was "the most exciting, creative experience I've ever had." Zanuck was a mentor to Guillermin. "If he'd said he'd wanted a picture on a lab technician in the Sahara, I'd have done it eagerly", said Guillermin. The film was a huge commercial success.

== Hollywood career ==
Guillermin received an offer to work in Hollywood, reuniting him with Peppard: P.J. (1968) (formerly known as Criss Cross), a detective movie for Universal. It was followed by another with Peppard shot in Europe, House of Cards (1968). Neither were that popular. The Bridge at Remagen (1969) was a movie set in the Second World War, shot in Czechoslovakia and produced by David Wolper. It was a difficult shoot, complicated by the 1968 Soviet invasion. El Condor (1970) was a Western shot in Spain with Jim Brown. Guillermin returned to MGM with Skyjacked (1972), a popular thriller with Charlton Heston. For the same studio, he made Shaft in Africa (1973).

=== Blockbusters ===
Guillermin had a big hit with The Towering Inferno (1974) for producer Irwin Allen. Allen got most of the critical kudos which annoyed the director. "I wanted to fight it because dammit I made that picture," said Guillermin. "But I let the studio talk me out of it. They said it would only hurt business. But I was wrong. I should have fought." He was meant to make Hennessy but was replaced by Don Sharp.

=== King Kong ===
Guillermin was meant to direct Midway (1976) but was replaced by Jack Smight. His next job came from Dino De Laurentis who was looking for a director for his remake of King Kong (1976). He had been turned down by Steven Spielberg, Miloš Forman, Roman Polanski and Sydney Pollack before going with Guillermin. "To me John Guillermin is a talent guy," said De Laurentis. "He is a strange character, but this don't mean anything to me. All directors are strange characters. Bergman is a strange character, Fellini is a strange character - all directors. He was very open to special effects. And then, he believe in the story; he believe in the love story. And if he believes in it, it works. Because John Guillermin believes in this fantastically human love story...Every director at one point jump from one category to another category. No director can be genius from first movie. You must give a chance when people are talented. And I recognize in John some quality. And he did it with Kong. He surprised you, surprised all critics."

"The original Kong was part of my childhood and I loved it," said Guillermin. "I dreamed about it. What I wanted to do was to re-create what I'd felt about it the first time I saw it, but still adapt the story to our own day. I didn't think and still don't that you could simply remake it...We all wanted and tried to get back to that lyrical childhood idea of the beauty and the beast. It was tricky trying to balance all the jokes on the one hand and the danger of bathos on the other, but I wanted it to be obvious that we regarded the material with sincerity."

King Kong stars Jeff Bridges recalled "so many problems" on the film. "Every week or so John Guillermin would just explode, yelling at everybody. It got to the point where we waited for his blow ups." Writer Lorenzo Semple Jr said there was "a creative tension" between Guillermin and De Laurentiis which "helped us all". Guillermin said in a 1976 interview "I've been directing all over the bloody world for 27 years, learning my craft, and by now it's dripping from my fingers. I was ready for Kong and it was a lovely opportunity. It could've been better if we'd had more time. Still I'm damned proud. It works. It ain't bad." "I'm tired of being anonymous," he said around this time. "I admit I've been antagonistic towards the press and publicity. You must admit directors were not taking seriously for a long time." He added that "I've outlived most of my contemporaries who are either destitute or gone on to other things. I may have been anonymous but I've been working with quiet satisfaction and I've made a lot of money. My price per film now is one million dollars plus ten percent of the gross."

He received an offer to direct the all-star film Death on the Nile (1978) for EMI Films shot in Egypt. "In Britain they seem to have run out of things to film," he said. "Over here there's an extraordinary freedom to take on an enormous variety of subjects." "Guillermin was not very nice to me," said Lois Chiles. "On my very first day when I questioned a direction I didn't understand, he stood there swearing at me. It was awful." In the late 1970s, Guillermin was attached to make The Godfather Part III and worked on a script with Dean Riesner and Mario Puzo. He made the Canadian horror film Mr. Patman (1980). After this, he was briefly connected to the film adaptation of Tai Pan to star Roger Moore.

=== Later career ===
Guillermin was replaced on Sahara (1983) by Andrew McLaglen. There were two attempts to repeat the success of King Kong: Sheena (1984) and King Kong Lives (1986). Sheena starred Tanya Roberts who recalled: "John screams until you get it right. He shouted at me to be 'honest’, and he wouldn't let up until I was. I'd be upset, but I worked harder until he was satisfied. He did his research, and he got sustained performances out of all of us." Her co-star Ted Wass said Gullermin was "a tough cookie and uncompromising in his vision. He either says 'That's a pile of crap and it won't be in my picture' or he goes for it. I think John...takes fantastic stories and then grounds them in a reality he finds a lot of time in the geographic locations."

Guillermin's son Michael-John died in a car accident during the making of Sheena. Guillermin was still grieving while making King Kong Lives. He occasionally left the set halfway through a day's shooting to go sailing. After one argument with the production staff, he stayed away for days. Filming was completed by uncredited, 21-year-old documentary film-maker Charles McCracken. Guillermin's last film was The Tracker (1988), a TV western starring Kris Kristofferson. For TV, he was one of the directors on La Révolution française: Les Années lumière (1989).

== Personality ==
Town on Trial (1957) showed his early craftsmanship, with Guillermin managing to obtain a menacing performance from the usually benign John Mills. Guillermin in time became known more as a general entertainment director than as an auteur director, and in his later career as a director for films with big budgets and spectacular effects. He also became known as a pipe-smoking exacting perfectionist, filming and refilming scenes to get exactly what he wanted. Unusual camera angles and hand-held camera shots were among his preferred options.

Memoirs of actors, editors and producers indicate that Guillermin was a difficult man to work with. He is described in Norma Barzman's book where he is mentioned in connection with the shooting of The Blue Max (1966) as having a "cold, stiff-lipped manner." Elmo Williams, producer of The Blue Max, described Guillermin as a "demanding director, indifferent to people getting hurt as long as he got realistic action...he was a hard-working, overly critical man whom the crew disliked. However, Guillermin was a master at camera setup."

Producer David L. Wolper wrote that Guillermin was "the most difficult director with whom I'd ever worked." Wolper further described Guillermin as "a real pain in the ass." Guillermin was directing Wolper's The Bridge at Remagen (1969). When some members of the Czech crew were late for the first day of filming in 1968, Guillermin screamed at them. He was told by a crew member if he did this again, the entire crew would walk off the set. Guillermin later told Wolper he could not set foot on the set one day because of the complexity of the filming. Wolper told Guillermin he was therefore sacked. Guillermin apologised and was re-employed immediately.

Ralph E. Winters was employed as editor for King Kong (1976) after a nice conversation with Guillermin. Winters described the director as "A skinny guy, dark, with very sharp features." In the screening room, Winters witnessed a frustrated Guillermin kicking the seat in front until it broke; Winters got an apologetic phone call the next day. Twenty-three years after the film was released, Guillermin called to compliment him on his work on King Kong. Charlton Heston described Guillermin as an "imaginative and skillful director" with an "irascible streak."

Before filming started on Midway (1976), producer Walter Mirisch replaced Guillermin with Jack Smight after Guillermin requested more time and equipment, particularly aeroplanes, than the budget allowed. Guillermin was also replaced as director on Sahara (1983) by Andrew V. McLaglen. Novelist James Dickey, who worked with him on the unfilmed Alnilam project in 1989, wrote that Guillermin was "one of those megalomaniacal directors who have to be given the gates of Heaven before they consider doing a project."

His work was re-appraised in Film Comment.

Why has Guillermin's career gone unrecognized? Easy: bad timing. Guillermin hit his stride at the end of the Fifties, just as a post-studio system style of filmmaking was arising with the French New Wave, Britain's Free Cinema, and so on. For the admirers of these idioms, Guillermin's meticulously executed and unapologetically classical works, such as The Blue Max (1966) or The Bridge at Remagen (1969), were anathema. The only Guillermin film that was somewhat in synch with the fashion of the day is Never Let Go (1960), an excursion into England's underworld that functions as a perfectly constructed parable about the new middle class's fear of falling—a kitchen-sink noir. The problem wasn't so much the disdain of new wave hipsters, as it was one of the director's attitude. Guillermin is something of a melancholic: In his coolly unflinching cinema, tired, traumatized men in desperate situations fight with dour determination for a few shreds of dignity. There's nothing conventionally uplifting about his films; his tales of violence, grimy glory, and defeat conceded with stoicism, don't make for easy viewing experiences. At their finest, Guillermin's films are howls from the soul's darker recesses—theirs is a savage heart.

"You know, there's really nothing like an exciting film on a big screen," Guillermin said in a 1990 interview. "Hopefully, I've made a few in my career."

== Personal life and death ==
On 20 July 1956, Guillermin married actress and author Maureen Connell. They had two children, Michelle and Michael-John, the latter of whom died in 1984 in a car accident in Truckee, California. They resided in the Los Angeles area beginning 1968. His second wife was Mary Guillermin, a family therapist and artist.

On 27 September 2015, Guillermin died in Topanga, California, from a heart attack. He was 89. Guillermin attributed much of his famed bad temper to depression.

== Award ==
- Evening Standard British Film Award 1980, for Death on the Nile.

== Filmography ==
=== Films ===
==== Director ====
Year	Title	Notes
1949	High Jinks in Society	co-directed, co-written and co-produced with Robert Jordan Hill
1950	Torment	also screenwriter and producer with Hill
1951	Smart Alec	
1951	Two on the Tiles	
1951	Four Days	
1952	Song of Paris	
1952	Miss Robin Hood	
1953	Strange Stories	co-directed with Don Chaffey
1953	Operation Diplomat	also screenwriter (with A.R. Rawlinson)
1954	The Crowded Day	
1954	Adventure in the Hopfields	
1956	Thunderstorm	
1957	Town on Trial	
1958	The Whole Truth	
1958	I Was Monty's Double	
1959	Tarzan's Greatest Adventure	also screenwriter with Berne Giler
1960	The Day They Robbed the Bank of England	
1960	Never Let Go	also story writer with Peter de Sarigny
1962	Waltz of the Toreadors	
1962	Tarzan Goes to India	also screenwriter with Robert Hardy Andrews
1964	Guns at Batasi	
1965	Rapture	
1966	The Blue Max	
1968	P.J.	
1968	House of Cards	
1969	The Bridge at Remagen	
1970	El Condor	
1972	Skyjacked	
1973	Shaft in Africa	
1974	The Towering Inferno	
1976	King Kong	
1978	Death on the Nile	
1980	Crossover	
1984	Sheena	
1986	King Kong Lives	

==== Other roles ====
Year	Title	Role	Notes
1949	Bless 'Em All	associate producer	Directed by Robert Jordan Hill
1949	Melody in the Dark	co-written and co-produced with Hill	Directed by Robert Jordan Hill

=== Television director ===
Year	Title	Notes
1953	Your Favorie Story	4 episodes
1956-1957	The Adventures of Aggie	15 episodes
1957-1958	Sailor of Fortune	13 episodes
1978	Death on the Nile: Making of Featurette	TV short documentary
1988	The Tracker	TV movie
