= The Tell-Tale Heart (1953 British film) =

1953 British film by J.B. Williams

- Directed by: J.B. Williams
- Screenplay by: J.B. Williams
- Based on: The Tell-Tale Heart; 1843 story by Edgar Allan Poe
- Produced by: Isadore Goldsmith
- Starring: Stanley Baker
- Cinematography: Basil Emmott
- Edited by: Peter Curran
- Music by: Hans May
- Production company: Alliance Productions Ltd.
- Distributed by: Adelphi Films Ltd.
- Release date: December 1953
- Running time: 20 minutes
- Country: United Kingdom
- Language: English

The Tell-Tale Heart is a 1953 British short film directed by J.B. Williams and starring Stanley Baker (the sole member of the cast). It was written by Williams based on the 1843 short story of the same name by Edgar Allan Poe, and was produced by Adelphi Films.

The film was believed lost until it became known in October 2018 that a 16mm copy was inadvertently bought in a Brighton junk shop in 1984 by Jeff Wells.

== Plot ==
A murderer hides his victim's body under the floorboards. He thinks he has got away with the crime, but haunted by the incessant sound of the dead man's heartbeats, is driven to confess.

== Cast ==
- Stanley Baker as Edgar Allan Poe

== Reception ==
The Monthly Film Bulletin wrote: This is scarcely a film, but rather a virtuoso performance by Stanley Baker, reading and acting the story, with the accompaniment of the sound of heart-beats. Good photography and lighting are marred by the frequent interpolation of shots of the moon with clouds scudding across it, while the fixed 'moonlight' of the interior set is never affected by these phenomena. The film, which hardly justifies its 'H' London Certificate, is essentially theatrical, with a good theatrical performance by Stanley Baker."
