= Let's Go Crazy (film) =

1951 British film by Alan Cullimore

- Opening title card
- Directed by: Alan Cullimore
- Written by: Spike Milligan; Peter Sellers
- Starring: Spike Milligan; Peter Sellers
- Production company: Advance Productions
- Distributed by: Adelphi Films Ltd. (UK)
- Release date: 1951
- Running time: 32 minutes
- Country: United Kingdom
- Language: English

Let's Go Crazy is a 1951 British short comedy film directed by Alan Cullimore. It was written by and stars Peter Sellers and Spike Milligan playing multiple roles.

The film comprises a series of comic sketches and song and dance routines, and is set in a restaurant.

== Cast ==
- Peter Sellers as Groucho Marx / Giuseppe / Cedric / Crystal Jollibottom / Izzy Gozunk
- Spike Milligan as Eccles, waiter
- Wallas Eaton as Mr Jollibottom
- Pat Kaye and Betty Ankers as variety act (piano and singer)
- Keith Warwick as variety act (singer)
- Jean Cavall as variety act (singer)
- Tommy Manley as
- Florence Austin
- Maxin & Johnson as variety act (comedy dancers)
- Freddie Mirfield and his Garbage Men

== Production ==
According to the BFI, the film was "opportunistically produced to use up paid-for studio time booked for the proto-Goon comedy Penny Points to Paradise (d. Tony Young, 1951)" and "was shot in Brighton over the course of one week."

== Critical reception ==
Kine Weekly wrote: "the performers are versatile and willing, but presentation lacks imagination and showmanship."

Sight and Sound wrote: "A skit set in a restaurant, it features Sellers in a variety of roles. He impersonates Groucho Marx relatively well but is inspired as a French restaurant manager and is even better as a conceited young English diner called Cedric, pretending to speak French. ("Avez vous le meatloaf salad and deux cups of Ie tea?") Milligan is on form but it's Sellers' protean brilliance that makes this memorable."
