= Adelphi Films =

British film production company

Adelphi Films Limited
- Industry: Movie
- Founded: 1939
- Founder: Arthur Dent
- Headquarters: England
- Owner: Kate Lees
- Website: www.adelphifilms.com

Adelphi Films Limited was a British film production company. With its sister company Advance, it produced over 30 films in the 1940s and 1950s and distributed many more. Adelphi linked Gainsborough Pictures and the raw "kitchen sink" dramas of the early 1960s.

Adelphi Films was founded in 1939 by Arthur Dent and is now managed by his granddaughter Kate Lees.

== Films ==
Adelphi is an archive of British feature films. The Adelphi film collection comprises over 40 British films, stored for decades in a London suburban garage. Dating mainly from the 1940s and 1950s, the Adelphi film collection features many British stars of the period, including James Mason, Max Bygraves, Spike Milligan, Diana Dors, Peter Sellers, Petula Clarke, Prunella Scales, Sid James, Wilson, Keppel and Betty and Rolf Harris' screen debut. Dorothy Squires' only film appearance was in Stars in Your Eyes (1956) which was co-scripted by Talbot Rothwell before he wrote scripts for the Carry On movies.

The collection holds many long unavailable films including featuring The Goons, first released in 1951, with Peter Sellers, Spike Milligan, Harry Secombe, Bill Kerr and Alfred Marks (Penny Points to Paradise and Let's Go Crazy). These films were released on DVD in August 2009.

Adelphi owns the copyright of the collection, (although several were released by other associated companies). In 2009, the company donated 30 reels of film to the BFI National Archive for restoration. Mainly shot in black and white, the films generally run between 80 and 90 minutes.

== People involved ==
The list of players reads like a ‘who's-who' of British acting and comedy talent of the period – Ronnie Corbett, Dennis Price, Hermione Baddeley, Fred Emney, Cardew Robinson, Freddie Frinton, Ted Ray, Dora Bryan, Rachel Roberts, Tommy Trinder, Brian Rix, Vera Day, Joan Hickson, Joan Sims, Harry Fowler, Diana Dors John Gregson, and David Tomlinson.

== History ==
Aldephi was founded in 1939. In 1949 it was acquired by Arthur Dent, who ran it with his two sons, Stanley and David. Arthur Dent had been a salesman for Famous Players–Lasky and worked for producers and Sam Goldwyn, and produced Comin' Thro the Rye (1947) for Advance.

== Select Films ==
- Law and Disorder (1940) – with Alistair Sim
- Fight – Giants of the mat (1944) (documentary)
- Comin’ Thro’ The Rye (1947)
- The Phantom Shot (1947)
- High Jinks in Society (1949) – directed by John Guillermin
- Skimpy in the Navy (1949) – as Advance
- Artful Dodgers (1949)
- Torment (1949) – directed by John Guillermin, with Dermot Walsh
- The Nitwits on Parade (1949)
- Melody in the Dark (1949) – written by John Guillermin
- The Bait (1950)
- A Ray of Sunshine (1950)
- Let's Go Crazy (1951) (short) – with Peter Sellers and Spike Milligan
- Penny Points to Paradise (1951) – with Sellers, Milligan and Harry Secombe
- My Wife's Lodger (1952) – as Adavance – with Diana Dors
- Death is a Number (1951)
- Lads and Lassies on Parade (1951)
- My Death Is a Mockery (1952) as Park Lane – with Donald Houston
- Song of Paris (1952) – directed by John Guillermin with Dennis Price
- I Was a Dancer (1952)
- The Kilties are Coming (1952)
- Is Your Honeymoon Really Necessary? (1953) – directed by Maurice Elvey with Doris Dors
- Disobedient (1953) – as Advance aka Intimate Relations
- The Great Game (1953) – as Advance, with Diana Dors
- Alf's Baby (1953) for ACT Films – with Pauline Stroud
- The Tell-Tale Heart (1953)
- He Done her Wrong (1953)
- The Slappiest Days of Our Lives (1953)
- Hands of Destiny (1954)
- Shop Spoiled (1954) aka The Crowded Day – directed by John Guillermin with John Gregson
- Don't Blame the Stork (1954) – as Advance-Objective
- Wishing Well (1954) as Advance) aka The Happiness of Three Women
- What Every Woman Wants (1954) – as Advance – directed by Maurice Elvey
- Fun at St Fanny's (1955)
- You Lucky People (1955) aka Get Fell In – as Advance – starring Maurice Elvey with Tommy Trinder
- Dollars for Sale (1955)
- Miss Tulip Stays the Night (1955) – as Jaywell – directed by Leslie Arliss with Diana Dors
- Stars in Your Eyes (1956) – directed by Maurice Elvey
- Fun at St Fanny’s (1956) – directed by Maurice Elvey
