= High Jinks in Society =

1949 British film by John Guillermin and Robert Jordan Hill

- Directed by: John Guillermin; Robert Jordan Hill
- Written by: John Guillermin; Robert Jordan Hill
- Produced by: John Guillermin; Robert Jordan Hill
- Starring: Ben Wrigley; Moore Marriott
- Cinematography: Gerald Gibbs
- Edited by: Robert Jordan Hill; Anne Barker
- Music by: Arthur Wilkinson
- Production company: Robert Jordan Hill Productions (as Advance)
- Distributed by: Adelphi Films Ltd. (UK)
- Release date: December 1949 (UK)
- Running time: 78 min.
- Country: United Kingdom
- Language: English

High Jinks in Society (also known as High Jinx in Society) is a 1949 British comedy film directed, written and produced by John Guillermin and Robert Jordan Hill and starring Ben Wrigley, Barbara Shaw, Basil Appleby, Peter Gawthorne and Moore Marriott.

== Plot ==
After foiling a robbery, window cleaner Ben is hired by aristocrat Lady Barr-Nunn to protect their valuables – with comic results.

== Cast ==
- Ben Wrigley as Ben
- Barbara Shaw as Angela
- Moore Marriott as Grandpa
- Basil Appleby as Hector
- Netta Westcott as Lady Barr-Nunn
- Michael Ward as Watkins
- Peter Gawthorne as Jenkins
- Jean Lodge as Sheila

== Production ==
It was an early film credit for John Guillermin.

== Reception ==
Kine Weekly wrote: "The picture never puts on airs, rather does it play down to its audience, but whichever way you look at it it's good honest, slapstick. The gags, which include an all-in wrestling burlesque and female impersonations, are surefire and good staging amplifies them."

Picturegoer wrote: "Crazy slapstick comedy set in the West End of London. It deals with the adventures – or rather misadventures – of a window cleaner turned detective. The role is played in amusingly goofy fashion by Ben Wrigley, who is helped out with music from the Radio Revellers and the Squadronaires. A conventional love interest is handled neatly by Jean Lodge and Basil Appleby. In the role of a grandfather is the late Moore Marriott. On the whole, sound, honest slapstick.
