= Hal Monty =

British comedian and actor (1907–1967)

- Born: Albert Sutan; 21 December 1907; Glasgow, Scotland
- Died: 17 November 1967 (aged 59); Saigon, Vietnam
- Other names: Albert Sutton; Eddie May
- Occupation(s): Comedian, actor, screenwriter
- Years active: 1920s–1967

Hal Monty (born Albert Sutan; 21 December 1907 – 17 November 1967) was a British comedian and actor.

== Life and career ==
Sutan was born in Glasgow, the son of Russian Jewish immigrants, and grew up in London. In the late 1920s, he performed as one half of a dance act, Grade and Sutton, with Boris Winogradsky, who later took the name Bernard Delfont.

He worked as both Albert Sutton and Eddie May, before taking the stage name Hal Monty. He developed a career in variety shows as a dancer and comedian, with the billing "Laugh and Be Happy". He also worked as a booking agent. By the time of the Second World War he was established as a slapstick comedian, and performed balloon modelling. He was popular as an armed forces entertainer, and toured with his own revue, Hal Monty's Blackbirds. He appeared on BBC Radio shows including Variety Bandbox and The Happidrome, sometimes credited as "the khaki-clad comedian" or "The General Forces Favourite". He toured with ENSA in 1945.

In 1949 he starred in two British comedy films as a military recruit, Bless 'Em All (alongside Max Bygraves in his screen debut), and its sequel Skimpy in the Navy, which he co-wrote. He toured Sweden in 1949 with his Blackbirds revue; performed in pantomimes in Britain; and appeared in the television show Variety Parade in 1953. He continued to tour through the 1950s and later, appearing in Singapore in 1966.

He died in Saigon, Vietnam, in 1967, at the age of 59.
