= What Every Woman Wants (1954 film) =

1954 British film by Maurice Elvey

- Directed by: Maurice Elvey
- Written by: Talbot Rothwell
- Based on: Relations Are Best Apart by Edwin Lewis
- Produced by: David Dent
- Starring: William Sylvester; Elsie Albiin; Brenda De Banzie
- Cinematography: Wilkie Cooper
- Edited by: Robert Jordan Hill
- Music by: Edwin Astley
- Production company: Advance Productions
- Distributed by: Adelphi Films
- Release date: 10 June 1954
- Running time: 86 minutes
- Country: United Kingdom
- Language: English

What Every Woman Wants is a 1954 British comedy film directed by Maurice Elvey and starring William Sylvester, Elsie Albiin, Brenda De Banzie and Patric Doonan, as well as featuring Brian Rix and Prunella Scales. It was based on the play Relations Are Best Apart by Edwin Lewis and was shot at Walton Studios outside London. The film's sets were designed by the art director John Stoll.

== Plot ==
At a time of a housing shortage just after World War II, a newly married couple, Mark and Jane, have to live with Jane's parents and extended family in a small, overcrowded terrace house in the English Midlands.

== Cast ==
- William Sylvester as Jim Barnes
- Elsie Albiin as Jane
- Brenda De Banzie as Sarah
- Patric Doonan as Mark
- Dominic Roche as Bill
- Joan Hickson as Polly Ann
- Brian Rix as Herbert
- Joan Sims as Doll
- Beckett Bould as Tom
- Prunella Scales as Mary
- Douglas Ives as Sam
- Edwin Richfield as Frank

== Critical reception ==
The Radio Times Guide to Films gave the film 3/5 stars, writing: "Maurice Elvey struggles to disguise the stage origins of this adaptation of Edwin Lewis's Relations Are Best Apart. A curious mix of social realism, situation comedy and romantic melodrama, future Carry On scribe Talbot Rothwell's script centres on Middletown newlyweds Elsie Albiin and Patric Doonan, who find themselves living with her adoptive parents because they can't afford a home of their own". Wilkie Cooper's views of the industrial landscape add grit to a thoughtful project full of fascinating socio-historical detail."

TV Guide rated the film two out of five stars, and noted "a realistic drama," in which,"housing shortages and unemployment, both delicate problems in England at the time, are treated in an effective, unpreachy manner."
