= Sailor of Fortune =

1955 British-Canadian TV series

- Directed by: John Guillermin
- Countries of origin: Canada; United Kingdom
- Original language: English
- No. of episodes: 31

Production
- Producer: Michael Sadlier
- Production companies: M.E. Films Ltd; Mid Ocean Productions

Original release
- Network: ITV
- Release: 17 September 1956

Sailor of Fortune is a 1955 British-Canadian TV series starring Lorne Greene. There were 26, 25 minute episodes film for this television series. Several episodes were directed by John Guillermin.

It was filmed at New Elstree Studios and Nettlefold Studios, both near London. Greene would go on to star in the popular American TV western series Bonanza.

== Plot ==
Grant ‘Mitch’ Mitchell is the skipper of the American motor freighter that is based in the Mediterranean. The captain take on jobs carrying cargo and “anything that is profitable and not too illegal” around North Africa.
