= The Captain's Paradise =

1953 British film by Anthony Kimmins

- Theatrical release poster
- Directed by: Anthony Kimmins
- Written by: Alec Coppel; Nicholas Phipps
- Based on: story by Alec Coppel
- Produced by: Anthony Kimmins
- Starring: Alec Guinness; Celia Johnson; Yvonne De Carlo
- Cinematography: Edward Scaife
- Edited by: Gerald Turney-Smith
- Music by: Malcolm Arnold
- Production company: London Films
- Distributed by: British Lion Films
- Release date: 9 June 1953
- Running time: 93 minutes
- Country: United Kingdom
- Languages: English; Spanish
- Box office: £146,548 (UK) $1,050,000 (est.) (US/Canada)

The Captain's Paradise is a 1953 British comedy film produced and directed by Anthony Kimmins, and starring Alec Guinness, Yvonne De Carlo and Celia Johnson. Guinness plays the captain of a passenger ship that travels regularly between Gibraltar and Spanish Morocco. De Carlo plays his Moroccan lover and Johnson plays his British wife. The film begins at just before the end of the story, which is then told in a series of flashbacks.

In 1958, the story was made into a Broadway musical comedy, retitled Oh, Captain!.

== Plot ==
In early 1950s North Africa, a man is escorted through an angry crowd by a platoon of soldiers. They enter a fort, and it is clear he is to be executed. The commander orders the soldiers to line up. He gives them orders to aim and fire. As the shots ring out, the scene shifts to a ferry ship, The Golden Fleece. Passengers embark for the two-day journey from Morocco to Gibraltar. Among them is an elderly gentleman, Lawrence St. James, who has come to speak with his nephew, the ship's captain, Henry St. James, on an unspecified matter. He is shocked to learn from the captain's first mate, Carlos Ricco, that he is dead. He begs Ricco to explain what happened. He learns that Henry, the prosperous owner and skipper of the ship, ferried passengers regularly between Gibraltar and North Africa.

In flashback, we witness Henry St. James keeping two separate relationships: (1) In Morocco, he lives with his lover, Nita – a young, tempestuous woman, 23 years younger than himself. He takes her out every night to fashionable restaurants and night clubs, celebrating a wild lifestyle. (2) In Gibraltar, he shares his life with Maud – his devoted wife, 15 years his junior – living a respectable, sober existence, and going to bed every night no later than ten. In Morocco, Henry presents Nita with lingerie and bikinis. But in Gibraltar, he buys Maud a vacuum cleaner. Both are delighted. On board his ship, he rejects all female company, choosing intellectual discussions with male passengers at his Captain's table. He has found a perfect existence – paradise. But it won't last.

All it takes is one careless mistake on the part of Henry. This leads to Ricco, up until then believing Nita to be the captain's wife, discovering that the true Mrs. St. James lives in Gibraltar. Ricco assists St. James in maintaining the deception when Maud flies to Morocco and by chance meets Nita. Henry arranges to have Maud arrested before she and Nita realise they are married to the same man. He convinces Maud that Morocco is a dangerous place and that she should never return there. The years pass. Maud has twins. She is thrilled with her two boys, but when they are sent to school in England, Maud is no longer enamoured with her marriage. She wants to dance and drink gin. On the other hand, Nita wants to stay home and cook for her man. Henry is dismayed and makes every effort to keep everything just the way it was. His attempts to maintain the status quo result in both women taking lovers. When Henry discovers Nita's infidelity, he leaves the flat as she continues the argument with her lover, Absalom. Nita shoots and kills her lover. In order to protect Nita, Henry claims he was the killer.

Return to the execution. Upon being given the order to aim and fire, the soldiers swing their rifles away from Henry and shoot their commanding officer. Henry hands them money and walks away.

== Cast ==
- Alec Guinness – Captain Henry St. James
- Charles Goldner – Chief Officer Carlos Ricco
- Miles Malleson – Lawrence St. James
- Yvonne De Carlo – Nita
- Celia Johnson – Maud
- Bill Fraser – Absalom
- Peter Bull – Firing-squad commander
- Nicholas Phipps – The Major
- Ambrosine Phillpotts – Marjorie
- Ferdy Mayne – The Sheikh
- Sebastian Cabot – Ali (vendor)
- Arthur Gomez – Chief steward
- George Benson – Mr. Salmon
- Bernard Rebel – Mr Wheeler
- Joyce Barbour – Mrs Reid, the housekeeper
- Claudia Grey – Susan Dailey
- Ann Hefferman – Daphne Bligh
- Walter Crisham – Bob
- Roger Delgado – Kalikan policeman

== Production ==
The film was based on an original story by Alec Coppel. Nicholas Phipps wrote the script.

The original title was Paradise. In 1951, it was announced that Rex Harrison and Lilli Palmer would star. The following year press reports said Laurence Olivier and Vivien Leigh were going to star, with Olivier to direct and Alex Korda to possibly produce.

Olivier and Leigh became unavailable. According to Yvonne De Carlo, when she was offered her role by director Anthony Kimmins, she agreed to do it if Alec Guinness played the lead. Kimmins said it was unlikely to get Guinness and that they would probably go for Ray Milland or Michael Wilding; De Carlo urged they try Guinness anyway and the actor accepted. Alec Guinness had a contract with Alex Korda to make one film a year – his casting was announced in Variety in October 1952. Celia Johnson signed to play the other lead.

Kimmins said: "We're trying to show man's triple side... there's the domestic wife – pipe and slippers side; then the jungle side – the girl-in-port sort of thing. Then there's the conversational, man-to-man side... And naturally we stay tongue in cheek throughout so we don't expect to wreck any homes."

Filming finished in March 1953. Yvonne De Carlo said she enjoyed the film because she "got the chance to act". She found working with Guinness "an exhilarating experience".

Guinness later recalled the film "had a nice script and was very enjoyable to make, especially the experience of working with Celia Johnson. I also enjoyed working with Tony Kimmins who was a very easy-going director. Rex Harrison told me that the part had originally been offered to him and I’m sure he would have been more suitable. I suppose Yvonne de Carlo was cast to boost the American sales."

== Release ==
=== UK release ===
The film was a hit at the British box office.

=== US release ===
The film was refused approval by the US Production Code on the ground it was immoral because the lead character was a bigamist. An extra scene was shot to say St James only lived with Nita in North Africa, he was not married to her, he was only married to Maud. This allowed the film to be released.

There were further issues with censors in the US. The film was banned in Maryland because it "made light of marriage".

Eventually further changes were made. A line referring to Guinness' character as a "saint" was cut, and an epilogue added to the end which stated the film was only a fairytale.

The movie was seen widely in the USA. A Variety article in January 1954 said:

Rising popularity of Britain's Alec Guinness among U. S. pic audiences is reflected in the fact that... [the film] is expected to outgross all that has gone before it... it has grossed $350,000 so far in 29 dates and is being helped along also by its much publicized difficulties with both the Production Code and local censors. If it continues its present pace, "Paradise" may gross more than the three prior Guinness pix together. "Lavender Hill Mob" so far has done $580,000; "Man in the White Suit" $460,000, and "The Promoter" $480,000.

In April 1954, Variety observed:

Guinness films have usually won praise from the key-city critics but until now had limited pull beyond the "art" circuit. But with his current "Captain's Paradise" he's now bigtime b.o. Pic... figures to ring up $1,000,000 in theatre rentals in the U. S. and Canada..."Paradise" has chalked up $630,000 in distribution loot in less than 1,500 dates. UA figures the film is a cinch to play a total of 5,000 bookings— exhibitor deals are being set at the rate of over 200 a week – and on this basis the $1,000,000 in total rentals looks for sure. Pic has been an especially remarkable click at the Paris Theatre, N.. Y., where the run is now in its 30th week and likely will continue for about another month.

By November 1954 it had earned $900,000.

== Critical reviews ==
In the Winter 2022/3 edition of The UK's Media Education Journal Colin McArthur in an essay 'Unacknowledged Parable of (de)Colonialisation' he explores the film in terms of its 'serious account of the inevitability of decolonialisation.

== DVD ==
Included as part of the Alec Guinness Collection,The Captain's Paradise was released on DVD in September 2002.
