= Penny Points to Paradise =

1951 British film by Tony Young

- Directed by: Tony Young
- Written by: John Ormonde
- Produced by: Alan Cullimore
- Starring: Harry Secombe; Alfred Marks; Peter Sellers; Paddie O'Neil; Spike Milligan
- Cinematography: Bert Mason
- Edited by: Harry Booth
- Music by: Jack Jordan; Spike Milligan
- Distributed by: Adelphi Films
- Release date: 1951
- Running time: 77 min
- Country: United Kingdom
- Language: English

Penny Points to Paradise is a 1951 second feature ('B') comedy film directed by Tony Young and starring Spike Milligan, Harry Secombe and Peter Sellers of The Goon Show in their feature film debut. It was written by John Ormonde.

In 1963–1964 Young produced The Telegoons for BBC Television.

== Plot ==
Harry Flakers has had a big win on the football pools. He and his friend Spike Donnelly decide to go to the same shabby seaside boarding house that they have always patronised for their summer holiday, but this year most of the other guests, including a young woman out to marry money, a dodgy investment advisor and a master forger and assistant, are intent on taking the fortune off them in one way or another.

Ultimately the forgers manage to substitute fake five-pound notes for the real ones that Flakers keeps in his suitcase, but before they can abscond with the money one of the women is given cash by Flakers to buy some cigarettes, and accused of passing false currency when the forgery is detected. A chase follows with half the characters pursuing the other half through a waxwork museum in which the true crooks have taken refuge. Justice is served when the chief forger boasts of his crime in front of what he thinks are two waxwork policemen, but who turn out to be real members of the force.

In the final scenes Flakers and Donnelly marry the two women.

There are sequences featuring a night out at the theatre where a stage hypnotist mesmerises Flakers and a woman into performing an operatic duet, he singing soprano and she baritone, and a scene in which Flakers wordlessly mimes an entire heart operation being carried out by a nervous surgeon.

== Cast ==
- Harry Secombe as Harry Flakers
- Alfred Marks as Edward Haynes
- Peter Sellers as The Major / Arnold Fringe
- Paddie O'Neil as Christine Russell (as Paddy O'Neil)
- Spike Milligan as Spike Donnelly
- Bill Kerr as Digger Graves
- Freddie Frinton as drunk
- Vicki Page as Sheila Gilroy
- Joe Linnane as policeman
- Hazel Jennings as landlady
- Sam Kydd as porter / taxi driver / newsvendor
- Patience Rentoul as Madame Moravia, hypnotist
- Felix Mendelssohn's Hawaiian Serenaders as themselves
- Del Watson as stagehand (uncredited)
- Diana Leslie
- Bob Bradfield

== Release and restoration ==
According to Peter Sellers "a terrifyingly bad film", the film was not profitable on initial release and was eventually re-issued for distribution abroad in 1960 as a cut-down 55-minute version under the title Penny Points. Many sections were removed, and some additional unrelated material was incorporated from the short comedy entitled Let's Go Crazy (1951) which had also featured Sellers. A print of this re-issue survived in the National Film and Sound Archive in Canberra, Australia.

A 16 mm copy of Penny Points to Paradise was discovered in 2006 in the archives of Adelphi Films, and in 2007 a 64-minute partial restoration was screened at BFI Southbank. Funding from an American Sellers fan made it possible to attempt a full restoration, using the 16mm print as a reference copy and working from the various incomplete 35mm archive sources. The resulting 72-minute version was screened by the BFI in July 2009, with a later DVD release. BFI curator Vic Pratt, described it as "a cheap and cheerful film that was filmed in just three weeks".

== Critical reception ==
Picture Show wrote: "Unsophisticated comedy ... The story is really a peg on which to hang a series of comic variety acts, with musical interlude by Felix Mendelssohn."

Picturegoer wrote: "Broad, music hall type of humour in a thin story ... The piece ends in a sort of Keystone Cops chase. Generally, the picture goes back to the days of silent films for its laughs. Nevertheless, it packs a few hearty chuckles. Harry Secombe, as the harassed pool winner, makes the most of the thin material."

The Daily Film Renter wrote: "Unpretentious knockabout comedy ... This exuberant tale of a football pools fortune, in fivers, in a suitcase, in a fireplace of a Brighton guest house, is the sort of comedy to break records in industrial areas, where tired crowds ask for nothing better than a good hearty laugh at the end of the day. Look at the cast and then book it."

Sight and Sound wrote: "Penny Points to Paradise is good-natured pre-Goons slapstick, made on the cheap by Adelphi Films and remarkably similar in tone and humour to Marcel Varnel's comedies of the 1930s. It retains considerable historical interest both because it has been unavailable for so long and because it features one of Peter Sellers' first screen performances."

Leslie Halliwell said: "Abysmally made comedy, only interesting as an early teaming of the Goons."

The Radio Times Guide to Films gave the film 2/5 stars, writing: "This cheap and cheerful curio stars The Goon Show's Harry Secombe, Spike Milligan and Peter Sellers. ... The plot, such as it is, is merely an excuse for the trio to each do their comic turns, while the acting is mannered and the slapstick humour weak, making this one for Goons fans only."

In British Sound Films: The Studio Years 1928–1959 David Quinlan rated the film as "mediocre", writing: "Early Goon-type effort is directionless, has just a few good chuckles."
