= Roger Avon =

English actor (1914–1998)

- in Daleks' Invasion Earth 2150 A.D. (1966)
- Born: 23 November 1914; Jarrow, County Durham, England
- Died: 21 December 1998 (aged 84); London, England
- Occupations: Stage, film and television actor
- Years active: 1951–98

Roger Avon (23 November 1914 – 21 December 1998) was an English stage, film and television actor born in Jarrow, County Durham.

Some of his television appearances include Hancock's Half Hour, Dad's Army, When the Boat Comes In, Department S, Doctor Who (serials The Crusade and The Daleks' Master Plan), Randall and Hopkirk (Deceased), Our Friends in the North and Blackadder the Third. He appeared in the films Daleks' Invasion Earth 2150 A.D., The Likely Lads, Mutiny on the Buses, Quatermass and the Pit and Curse of the Crimson Altar, among others.

Avon was still acting up until his death, aged 84, his last role being in the TV series Grafters, starring Robson Green.

== Selected filmography ==
- Fun at St. Fanny's (1955) – Horsetrough
- The Time of His Life (1955) – Prison Warder (uncredited)
- Stars in Your Eyes (1957) – Grimes
- The Scamp (1957) – Constable
- Kill Her Gently (1957) – Const. Brown
- Womaneater (1958) – Constable
- A Night to Remember (1958) – Lookout Reginald Lee (uncredited)
- Dial 999 (TV series), ('Deadly Blackmail', episode) (1959) - Crime witness (uncredited)
- Dial 999 (TV series) ('Ghost Squad', episode) (1959) - MacTavish
- The Ugly Duckling (1959) – Reporter
- Saturday Night and Sunday Morning (1960) – Policeman at Window Breaking (uncredited)
- The Hellfire Club (1961) – Turnkey
- Murder at the Gallop (1963) – Forensic Photographer (uncredited)
- A Hard Day's Night (1964) – Policeman Following Ringo (uncredited)
- Runaway Railway (1965) – Waterhouse
- Daleks' Invasion Earth 2150 A.D. (1966) – Wells
- Cuckoo Patrol (1967) – Policeman
- Quatermass and the Pit (1967) – Electrician
- Curse of the Crimson Altar (1968) – Sergeant Tyson
- Burke & Hare (1971) – Second Guard
- Mutiny on the Buses (1972) – Policeman (Safari Park)
- Au Pair Girls (1972) – Rathbone
- Hide and Seek (1972) – First workman
- The Likely Lads (1976) – Joe the Landlord
- George and Mildred (1980) – Commissionaire
- The Dresser (1983) – Charles
