= Melody in the Dark =

- Theatrical release poster
- Directed by: Robert Jordan Hill
- Written by: John Guillermin; Robert Jordan Hill
- Produced by: Robert Jordan Hill; John Guillermin
- Starring: Ben Wrigley; Eunice Gayson
- Cinematography: Jo Jago
- Music by: George Melachrino
- Production company: Robert Jordan Hill Productions
- Distributed by: Adelphi Films Ltd. (UK)
- Release date: 25 July 1949 (UK)
- Running time: 68 minutes
- Country: United Kingdom
- Language: English

Melody in the Dark is a 1949 British second feature ('B') musical comedy horror film directed by Robert Jordan Hill and starring Ben Wrigley and Eunice Gayson. It was written by Hill and John Guillermin.

== Premise ==
When actress Pat Evans inherits a spooky old house and uses it for rehearsals with her theatre company, they are troubled by "ghosts".

== Cast ==
- Ben Wrigley as Ben
- Eunice Gayson as Pat Evans
- Dawn Lesley as Dawn
- Richard Thorp as Dick
- Lionel Newbold as Uncle Egbert
- Ida Patlanski as Mrs Grimes
- The London Lovelies as model girls
- Carl Carlisle as guest artiste
- Maisie Weldon as Guest Artiste
- The Stardusters Dance Orchestra
- Alan Dean as lead singer/pianist
- The Keynotes as singing group

== Reception ==
The Monthly Film Bulletin wrote: "An amateurish film ... The acting is very poor and the dialogue not too good. Ben Wrigley is comical and raises many laughs, and without him the film would be more uninteresting than it is. The production, direction and photography are below average."

Kine Weekly wrote: "Screwy, spooky house musical, introducing resourceful, giraffe-necked stage comedian Beg Wrigley to the screen. Boisterous and tireless improvisator, he holds the extravagant tale together and in the same breath provides cues for song. The low but lively nonsense is bound to tickle the industrial masses. Capital knockabout quota. ... Conventional mystery melodrama is burlesqued with gusto by the star and the supporting players and tuneful melodies effectively interleave the breezy banter."

Picturegoer wrote: "There is some good melodramatic burlesque, but the theme is worn threadbare. Support is fair, but the comedy as a whole is far from being on a high level."
