= Bernard Rebel =

British actor (1901–1964)

Bernard Rebel in Song of Paris (1952)

Bernard Rebel (6 October 1901, Poland – 30 September 1964, London, England) was a Polish-born British actor. His work included the role of Wormtongue in the 1955-56 BBC radio series The Lord of the Rings.

== Selected filmography ==
- Crook's Tour (1942) - Klacken
- The Big Blockade (1942) - Quisling
- Anna Karenina (1948) - Prof. Leverrin (uncredited)
- The Bad Lord Byron (1949) - Dr. Bruno
- Chance of a Lifetime (1950) - Xenobian
- Song of Paris (1952) - Lebrun
- Top Secret (1952) - Trubiev
- Moulin Rouge (1952) - Playwright (uncredited)
- The Captain's Paradise (1953) - Mr. Wheeler
- Wheel of Fate (1953)
- Laughing Anne (1953) - Pianist
- Twist of Fate (1954) - Engraver
- The Young Lovers (1954) - Stefan
- Colonel March of Scotland Yard (1954)
- Little Red Monkey (1955) - Vinson - Spy Henchman
- 1984 (1956) - Kalador (uncredited)
- It's a Wonderful World (1956) - Frenchman
- Orders to Kill (1958) - (uncredited)
- Mark of the Phoenix (1958) - Vachek
- The Rebel (1961) - Art Dealer
- The Curse of the Mummy's Tomb (1964) - Prof. Eugene Dubois (uncredited)
