= Fun at St. Fanny's =

1955 British film by Maurice Elvey

- Theatrical release poster
- Directed by: Maurice Elvey
- Written by: Fred Emney; Anthony Verney; Denis Waldock
- Produced by: David Dent; Peter Noble
- Starring: Fred Emney; Cardew Robinson; Vera Day; Davy Kaye
- Cinematography: Eric Cross
- Edited by: Robert Jordan Hill
- Music by: Edwin Astley
- Production company: Adelphi Films
- Distributed by: British Lion (UK)
- Release dates: 15 December 1955 (London, England)
- Running time: 80 minutes
- Country: United Kingdom
- Language: English

Fun at St. Fanny's is a 1955 British comedy film directed by Maurice Elvey and starring Fred Emney, Cardew Robinson and Vera Day. It was written by Emney, Anthony Verney and Denis Waldock. The film revolves around the teachers and students at St Fanny's private school. It was based on Robinson's "Cardew the Cad" character, which he created in 1942 and which was featured in the BBC's Variety Bandbox programme.

== Plot ==
Cardew the Cad is a 25-year-old pupil at St. Fanny's school who will inherit a fortune unless he is expelled, when the cash will go to the school. Headmaster Dr. Septimus Jankers tries to get Cardew expelled by framing him for a robbery committed by a gang of villains. But his plan is foiled by Maisie, sister of one of the crooks, who has fallen in love with Cardew.

== Cast ==
- Fred Emney as Dr. Septimus Jankers
- Cardew Robinson as Cardew the Cad
- Vera Day as Maisie
- Johnny Brandon as Fanshawe
- Davy Kaye as Ferdy
- Freddie Mills as Harry the Scar
- Gerald Campion as Fatty Gilbert
- Miriam Karlin as Mildred
- Claude Hulbert as Winkle
- Kynaston Reeves as McTavish
- Gabrielle Brune as Matron
- Stanley Unwin as the guide
- Dino Galvani as Pumpernickel
- Peter Butterworth as the potter
- Paul Daneman as Fudge
- Roger Avon as Horsetrough
- Ronnie Corbett as Chumleigh
- Aud Johansen as Praline
- Tom Gill as constable
- Marianne Stone
- Douglas Ives as museum attendant
- Stuart Saunders as Police Sergeant
- Neil Wilson as second museum attendant
- Melvyn Hayes as heckling boy at concert
- Anthony Valentine as schoolboy in audience

== Production ==
The film's sets were designed by art director Norman G. Arnold.

== Critical reception ==
The Monthly Film Bulletin wrote: "The talents of excellent music-hall performers (Fred Emney and Miriam Karlin) and able character actors (Vera Day, Gerald Campion, Claude Hulbert) are atrophied by the wretched story and puerile dialogue of this depressing farce."

Picturegoer wrote: "First-rate talent has been assembled to perpetrate this monstrosity of a film idea. No one gets a fair chance – not Fred Emney, not Johnny Brandon (a pleasing personality, who has just one mediocre number to sing), not Vera Day, not Robinson himself. But it's not quite a lost cause. There's Miriam Karlin – who knows how to make a comic mountain out of a molehill."

Picture Show wrote: "Rollicking, slapstick comedy ... There are plenty of lively jokes and the popular stars romp through this amusing film."

Variety wrote: "A straggling story, set in a boy's college, shows a harassed headmaster dodging pressing creditors. Humor is labored and the stock situations handed out with an edge of vulgarity showing nothing new in idea or treatment, utilizing all the immature antics of uncontrollable youngsters. ... Cardew Robinson, vaude-tv comic, plays himself in the role of protracted adolescent, making a play for the femme staff and extracting many laughs. Miriam Karlin handles the tough female teacher assignment realistically while Gabrielle Brune is the school matron. Vera Day swings a pretty hip as the bookie's chiselling sister. Claude Hulbert contributes his customary fatuous pose as a junior master. Freddie Mills, ex-boxing champ, and Davy Kaye represent the seamy side of the racetrack with conviction."

The Standard called it "the British school joke stretched almost to infinity."

In British Sound Films: The Studio Years 1928–1959 David Quinlan rated the film as "poor", writing: "Competent cast routed by what must be one of film history's worst comedy screenplays."
