= Peter Bull =

British actor (1912–1984)

Peter Bull DSC
- Born: Peter Cecil Bull; 21 March 1912; London, England
- Died: 20 May 1984 (aged 72); London, England
- Occupations: Actor, author
- Years active: 1936–1984

Peter Cecil Bull DSC (21 March 1912 – 20 May 1984) was a British actor who appeared on the stage and in supporting roles in such films as The African Queen, Tom Jones and Dr. Strangelove; he wrote twelve books.

== Biography ==
=== Pre-war ===
He was the fourth and youngest son of William Bull, later Sir William Bull, 1st Baronet, Member of Parliament for Hammersmith. Bull was educated at Winchester College. His first professional stage appearance was in If I Were You at the Shaftesbury Theatre in 1933.

=== War service ===
He was a friend of Alec Guinness, whom he first met at HMS Raleigh during training in the Second World War, and later HMS King Alfred. He served as an officer in the Royal Naval Volunteer Reserve, later commanding Landing Craft (Flak) 16 in the Mediterranean. He achieved the rank of lieutenant commander and was awarded the Distinguished Service Cross.

=== Post-war ===
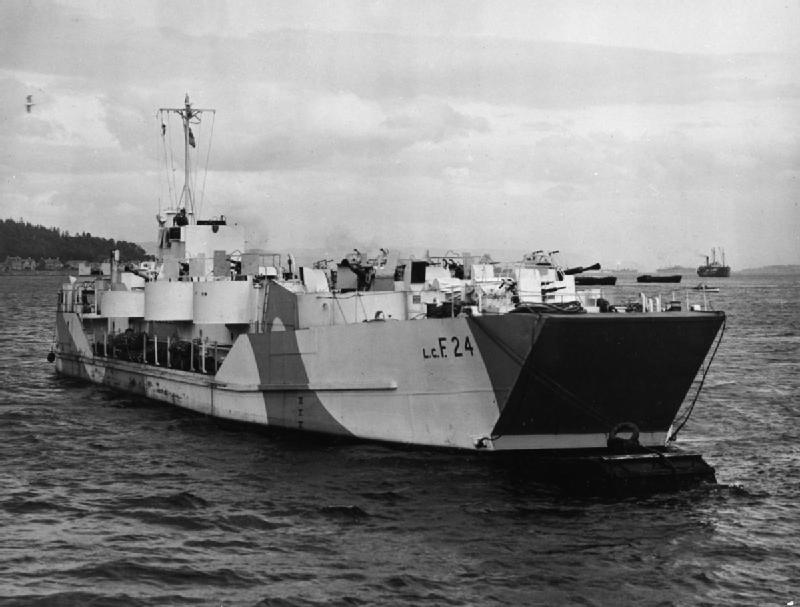
Landing Craft Flak with 20 mm Oerlikon and four QF 2-pounder "pom-pom" anti-aircraft guns

Returning to acting after the war, he narrated and had a small role in Scrooge (1951) and portrayed the captain of the ship that Katharine Hepburn's and Humphrey Bogart's characters set out to destroy, whom they persuade to marry them just before they are to be executed, in The African Queen (1951). Bull was the first actor to portray Pozzo in the English-language version of Samuel Beckett's Waiting for Godot when it opened on 3 August 1955.

Bull's performance as the Soviet Ambassador, Alexi de Sadesky, in Dr. Strangelove (1964) is probably the best known of his many film and TV appearances. He was cast as Thwackum, one of Blifil's two tutors, in the 1963 film Tom Jones. In the 1970s, he ran a small shop just off Notting Hill Gate, selling zodiac-related items.

Bull was an avid collector of teddy bears. He published a number of books about them, including Bear With Me and The Teddy Bear Book, as well as a book on his adventures on the Greek islands of Corfu and Paxos, where he owned a house, It isn't all Greek to me, illustrated by Roger Furse. He was also the author of a non-fiction book about his experiences during the Second World War as commander of a Tank Landing Craft (LCT), To Sea in a Sieve (1956), the best-selling I Say, Look Here!: The Rather Random Reminiscences of a Round Actor in the Square (1965) and several memoirs and collections of his letters. Peter Bull died of a heart attack in London on 20 May 1984 at 72 years of age.

== Partial filmography ==
- The Secret Voice (1936) as Minor Role (uncredited)
- The Beloved Vagabond (1936) as Artist in bar (uncredited)
- As You Like It (1936) as William
- Sabotage (1936) as Michaelis – Conspirator (uncredited)
- Knight Without Armour (1937) as Commissar (uncredited)
- Non-Stop New York (1937) as Spurgeon
- Sunset in Vienna (1937) as Turk Outside Café
- Second Best Bed (1938) as Tennis match spectator (uncredited)
- Marie Antoinette (1938) as Gamin (uncredited)
- The Ware Case (1938) as Eustace Ede
- Young Man's Fancy (1939) as French Soldier (uncredited)
- Inspector Hornleigh (1939) as Radio Ham Operator (uncredited)
- Dead Man's Shoes (1940) as Defence Counsel
- Contraband (1940) as Third Brother Grimm
- Quiet Wedding (1941) as Tenor (uncredited)
- The Grand Escapade (1947) as Jennings
- The Turners of Prospect Road (1947) as J.G. Clarkson
- They Made Me a Fugitive (1947) as Fidgity Phil
- Oliver Twist (1948) as Landlord of 'Three Cripples' tavern
- Saraband for Dead Lovers (1948) as Prince George Louis
- Woman Hater (1948) as Mr. Fletcher
- Look Before You Love (1948) as Ship Passenger (uncredited)
- Cardboard Cavalier (1949) as Mosspot
- Alice in Wonderland (1949) as Puppet Character (voice)
- The Lost People (1949) as Wolf
- The Reluctant Widow (1950)
- I'll Get You for This (1951) as Hans
- Smart Alec (1951) as Prosecuting Counsel
- The Lavender Hill Mob (1951) as Joe the Gab (uncredited)
- The Six Men (1951) as Walkeley
- Scrooge (1951) as First Businessman / Narrator
- The African Queen (1951) as Captain of Louisa
- Salute the Toff (1952) as Lorne (uncredited)
- The Second Mrs Tanqueray (1952) as Misquith
- Strange Stories (1953) as Captain Breen
- The Captain's Paradise (1953) as Kalikan firing-squad officer
- Malta Story (1953) as Flying Officer (uncredited)
- Saadia (1953) as Village potentate
- Beau Brummell (1954) as Mr. Fox
- Footsteps in the Fog (1955) as Brasher
- Who Done It? (1956) as Scientist
- The Green Man (1956) as General Niva
- The Horse's Mouth (1958) as Man in Taxi (uncredited)
- Tom Thumb (1958) as Town Crier
- The Scapegoat (1959) as Aristide
- The 3 Worlds of Gulliver (1960) as Lord Bermogg
- The Rebel (1961) as Manager of Art Gallery, Paris
- Goodbye Again (1961) as Client
- Follow That Man (1961) as Gustav
- The Girl on the Boat (1962) as Blacksmith
- Tom Jones (1963) as Thwackum
- The Old Dark House (1963) as Caspar Femm / Jasper Femm
- Dr. Strangelove (1964) as Russian Ambassador Alexi de Sadesky
- The Intelligence Men (1965) as Philippe
- You Must Be Joking! (1965) as Ferocious Man in Library
- Licensed to Kill (1965) as Masterman
- Doctor Dolittle (1967) as General Bellowes
- Lock Up Your Daughters (1969) as Bull
- The Executioner (1970) as Butterfield
- Up the Front (1972) as General Von Kobler
- Alice's Adventures in Wonderland (1972) as Duchess
- Lady Caroline Lamb (1972) as Minister
- Girl Stroke Boy (1973) as Peter Hovendon
- Joseph Andrews (1977) as Sir Thomas Booby
- The Brute (1977) as Housemaster
- Rosie Dixon – Night Nurse (1978) as August Visitor
- The Tempest (1979) as Alonso, the King of Naples
- Yellowbeard (1983) as Queen Anne (final film role)

== Theatrical appearances ==
Data from Peter Bull and Sheridan Morley (ed.) [1985]

- If I were You (début), As You Desire Me, Escape Me Never, London 1933
- Escape Me Never, New York (1935)
- Founder and manager of Perranporth Summer Theatre, 1936–1939
- The Boy David, London, 1936
- Judgement Day, London, 1939
- The Lady's Not for Burning, London, 1948
- Pericles, London, The Lady's Not for Burning, New York, 1950
- Figure of Fun, London, 1951
- Under the Sycamore Tree, London, 1952
- Second Best Bed, The Man with Expensive Tastes, London, 1953
- The Dark is Light Enough, London, 1954
- Waiting for Godot, London, 1955
- The Restless Heart, Man of Distinction, London, 1957
- Luther, London, Paris, 1961
- Pickwick, London, Luther, New York, 1963
- Pickwick, New York, 1965
- Black Comedy, New York, 1967

== Published works ==
- To Sea in a Sieve (1956)
- Bulls in the Meadow (1957)
- I Know the Face But... (1959)
- Not on Your Telly (1961)
- I Say Look Here (1965)
- It Isn't All Greek to Me (1967)
- Bear with me (1969)
- The Teddy Bear Book (1970)
- Life Is a Cucumber (1973)
- Peter Bull's Book of Teddy Bears (1977a)
- A Hug of Teddy Bears (1984)
- Bull's Eyes: The Selected Memoirs of Peter Bull (1986)

== Bibliography ==
- Bull, Peter (1977) [1956]. To Sea in a Seive: The little Ships (pbk. repr. Corgi Books, London ed.). London: Peter Davies. ISBN 0-552-10380-2.
- Bull, Peter (1985). Morley, Sheridan (ed.). Bull's Eyes: The Selected Memoirs of Peter Bull. London: Robin Clark. ISBN 0-86072-095-0.
