= Kynaston Reeves =

English actor (1893–1971)

- in Take a Chance (1937)
- Born: Philip Arthur Reeves; 29 May 1893; London, England
- Died: 5 December 1971 (aged 78); London, England
- Other name: P. Kynaston Reeves
- Occupation: character actor
- Spouse: Paula Sabina
- Children: two: daughter and son

Philip Arthur Reeves (29 May 1893 – 5 December 1971), known professionally as Kynaston Reeves, was an English character actor who appeared in numerous films and many television plays and series.

== Early life ==
Reeves was born in London on 29 May 1893 and was the first of two sons of Arthur Robert Reeves (born 1855) and Clarissa Mary Kynaston (b. 1864). His brother was John Edward.

He was married to the Australian Jewish stage actress Paula Sabina. They had two children, Thomas and Suzanne.

== Career ==
Philip Arthur Reeves, professionally known as P. Kynaston Reeves or Kynaston Reeves, took his mother's maiden name as a middle name when commencing his film career with a small part in the 1931 film Many Waters, before dispensing with the prefixed initial. He believed that having a name that reminded directors of the famous actor Edward Kynaston would help him to get work. In 1932, he progressed to a supporting role, playing an editor called Bob Mitchell alongside Ivor Novello and Jack Hawkins in The Lodger (renamed The Phantom Fiend in 1935).

After playing the Reverend Edmund Ovington opposite Otto Kruger in the 1938 film, Housemaster, Reeves developed a speciality for portraying authority figures, such as judges, doctors, professors and clergymen.

Television was to provide a valuable source of income. In 1950, Reeves was invited to perform the character of Mr Growser in a BBC Television children's show, The Cruise of The Toytown Belle.

This led to further work for the children's department at the BBC, namely in adaptations of Shakespeare's The Tempest (as Alonso, King of Naples) and Philip Wade's Jenny Meade (as Mr Steele), both produced in 1951.

Reeves was then offered one of his most notable acting parts on television, namely that of Henry Quelch, form master to the 'Fat Owl of the Remove', Billy Bunter, in the long-running television series Billy Bunter of Greyfriars School. He recorded six episodes in 1952, after which fellow actors Raf De La Torre, John Woodnutt and Jack Melford began sharing the portrayal of this supporting character. Making just a single episode in 1954 ("Bunter Won't Go"), Reeves then returned to reprise the performance for two more episodes in 1956, and a further four in 1957, following which he gave up the role.

This did not end his involvement with BBC productions however, and in 1958 he appeared in the six-part project Leave It To Todhunter (based on the 1937 book "Trial and Error" by Anthony Berkeley), playing Ambrose Chitterwick in an episode called "In Search Of A Corpse".

In 1959 he played the Duke of Omnium in all six episodes of another series from the BBC, The Eustace Diamonds, adapted from the novel by Anthony Trollope about the London society scandal caused in the 19th century when a diamond necklace goes missing.

In 1962, he starred as Thomas Crawford in the Broadway play The Affair.

In a rare outing for ABC Weekend TV, he took the part of Major General Goddard in a 1966 episode of The Avengers TV series, entitled "What the Butler Saw" and starring Patrick Macnee and Diana Rigg, but would go on to play an entirely different character called Dickens in the 1968 screening of "Legacy Of Death", by which time Linda Thorson was portraying John Steed's female sidekick.

Reeves also appeared in seven of 26 episodes of the classic BBC television series The Forsyte Saga, broadcast in early 1967, playing Nicholas Forsyte.

He could be seen throughout the 1960s in a variety of other popular productions, such as the police serial No Hiding Place, drama anthologies Armchair Theatre and The Wednesday Play and as "The Minister" in an episode of Patrick McGoohan's The Prisoner television series.

Reeves' film career continued in parallel with his small screen contributions, and in 1941 he had portrayed Lord Stanley to John Gielgud's Disraeli in the biographical treatment The Prime Minister. In 1948 he played Dr Chawner in the Peter Ustinov tour de force Vice Versa (Ustinov having written, co-produced and directed it), and in the same year he appeared as the Lord Chief Justice of the High Court in The Winslow Boy, which starred Robert Donat. In 1950 he revisited the subject of Disraeli in the film The Mudlark, when he took the part of General Sir Henry Ponsonby in the story of a street urchin (or "mudlark") who is found in Windsor Castle attempting to talk to Queen Victoria. This time, Disraeli is played by Alec Guinness.

In 1957, he took the role of Professor Walgate in the science fiction B film Fiend Without a Face, whose hero was played by Marshall Thompson, and whose plot had Canada attacked by mutated caterpillar-like creatures made of human spines and brains. During a period of steady cinematic work, he also found time to portray a "testy old millionaire" in Carry On Regardless in 1961.

A year before his death in 1971, he made both his final television appearance and his last film. In a dramatic enactment during an edition of the BBC arts magazine Omnibus, he took the part of French painter Renoir in a piece entitled "A Requiem for Modigliani", describing the final part of the Italian artist's life, and his love affairs. And in the cinema, he fulfilled a small role in The Private Life of Sherlock Holmes, the 1970 film which starred Robert Stephens and Geneviève Page.

== Death ==
Reeves died of cerebral thrombosis in Lewisham, London, on 5 December 1971, at the age of 78.

== Selected filmography ==
- Many Waters (1931) – Minor Role (uncredited)
- Frail Women (1932) – (uncredited)
- The Sign of the Four (1932) – Bartholomew Sholto (uncredited)
- The Lodger (1932) – Bob Mitchell
- Puppets of Fate (1933) – John Heath
- The Crimson Candle (1934) – Inspector Blunt
- The Broken Melody (1934) – Colonel Fitzroy
- Jew Süss (1934) – (uncredited)
- Vintage Wine (1935) – Benedict Popinot
- Dark World (1935) – John
- Take a Chance (1937) – Blinkers Grayson
- A Romance in Flanders (1937) – Major Burke
- Housemaster (1938) – The Rev. Ovington
- The Citadel (1938) – Doctor (uncredited)
- The Outsider (1939) – Sir Montague Tollemach
- Dead Men are Dangerous (1939) – James Franklin
- Inspector Hornleigh (1939) – Dr. Manners
- Sons of the Sea (1939) – Prof Devar
- The Stars Look Down (1940) – Strother
- The Flying Squad (1940) – Magistrate
- Two for Danger (1940) – Dr. George Frencham
- The Prime Minister (1941) – Lord Stanley (uncredited)
- This England (1941) – (uncredited)
- The Young Mr. Pitt (1942) – Minor Role (uncredited)
- They Met in the Dark (1943) – Naval Officer in Charge of Court Martial
- The Night Invader (1943) – Sir Michael
- Strawberry Roan (1944) – Horse Dealer
- Murder in Reverse (1945) – Crossley King's Counsel
- The Rake's Progress (1945) – Oxford Dean (uncredited)
- The Echo Murders (1945) – Beales
- Bedelia (1946) – Mr. Bennett
- This Was a Woman (1948) – Dr. Morrison
- Vice Versa (1948) – Dr. Chawner
- Counterblast (1948) – Lucas' Butler (uncredited)
- The Weaker Sex (1948) – Captain Dishart
- The Guinea Pig (1948) – The Bishop
- The Winslow Boy (1948) – Lord Chief Justice
- Badger's Green (1949) – Dr. Wetherby
- For Them That Trespass (1949) – The Judge (uncredited)
- Madness of the Heart (1949) – Sir Robert Hammond
- The Twenty Questions Murder Mystery (1950) – Gen. Maitland
- Madeleine (1950) – Dr. Penny
- Tony Draws a Horse (1950) – Dr. Bletchley
- Trio (1950) – Undetermined Secondary Role (uncredited)
- Blackout (1950) – Mr. Dale
- The Mudlark (1950) – General Sir Ponsonby (uncredited)
- Smart Alec (1951) – Uncle Edward
- Captain Horatio Hornblower R.N. (1951) – Adm. Lord Hood
- Song of Paris (1952) – Vicar
- Penny Princess (1952) – Burgomaster – Policeman
- Top Secret (1952) – Barworth Director
- Top of the Form (1953) – The Dean
- Laxdale Hall (1953) – Rev. Ian Macaulay
- Four Sided Triangle (1953) – Lord Grant
- Eight O'Clock Walk (1954) – Mr. Munro
- The Crowded Day (1954) – Mr. Ronson
- Burnt Evidence (1954) – Pathologist
- Fun at St. Fanny's (1955) – Mc. Tavish
- Guilty? – Colonel Wright
- Brothers in Law (1957) – Mr. Justice Lawson
- High Flight (1957) – Air Minister
- Fiend Without a Face (1958) – Prof. R.E. Walgate
- A Question of Adultery (1958) – Judge
- Carlton-Browne of the F.O. (1959) – Sir Arthur Carlton-Browne
- School for Scoundrels (1960) – General
- In the Nick (1960) – Judge
- The Night We Got the Bird (1961) – Mr. Warre-Monger
- Carry On Regardless (1961) – Sir Theodore
- The Shadow of the Cat (1961) – The Grandfather
- Don't Bother to Knock (1961) – Neighbor
- Go to Blazes (1962) – 1st Clubman
- In the Doghouse (1961) – Colonel
- Hide and Seek (1964) – Hunter
- The Caramel Crisis (1966)
- Gates to Paradise (1968) – Superior
- Hot Millions (1968) – Quayle (uncredited)
- Anne of the Thousand Days (1969) – Willoughby (uncredited)
- The Private Life of Sherlock Holmes (1970) – Old Man (uncredited)
