= Four Days (1951 film) =

- Directed by: John Guillermin
- Written by: Lindsay Galloway; J. MacLaren Ross
- Based on: the play Four Days by Monckton Hoffe
- Produced by: Roger Proudlock
- Starring: Hugh McDermott; Kathleen Byron; Peter Reynolds
- Cinematography: Ray Elton
- Edited by: Robert Jordan Hill
- Music by: Peter D. Barker
- Production company: Vandyke Productions
- Distributed by: Grand National Pictures (U.K.)
- Release date: October 1951 (U.K.)
- Running time: 55 minutes
- Country: United Kingdom
- Language: English

Four Days is a 1951 British second feature ('B') drama film directed by John Guillermin. It was written by Lindsay Galloway and J. MacLaren Ross based on the 1945 play of the same name by Monckton Hoffe.

== Plot ==
Businessman Francis Templar suspects his neglected wife Lucienne of having an affair with his business partner's son Johnny. When the two of them confess, Templar refuses to give his wife a divorce and she retaliates by trying to poison him. Johnny however, intervenes, and manages to prevent the murder. During the next few days, Lucienne comes to realise she loves her husband after all; but Templar, believing his wife is about to leave him, attempts suicide by jumping off a cliff. He survives the fall, but loses all memory of the previous four days. Now an amnesiac, Templar is blissfully in love with his devoted wife. However, she fears their happiness is only temporary, and dreads the return of her husband's memory. To make matters worse, Johnny then reappears to blackmail Lucienne, threatening to reveal all to her husband.

== Cast ==
- Hugh McDermott as Francis Templar
- Kathleen Byron as Lucienne Templar
- Peter Reynolds as Johnny Keylin
- Gordon McLeod as Mr. Keylin
- H.G. Stoker as Baxter
- John Harvey as Hammond Stubbs
- Petra Davies as Helen

== Critical reception ==
The Monthly Film Bulletin wrote: "An unconvincing story, with a happy ending which the wife's previous behaviour makes ridiculous, does not gain from indifferent construction and from the short running time which telescopes the twists of the plot. Peter Reynolds is good as the detestable lover; the other performances are indifferent, and the director relies overmuch on the use of low angle camera shots."

TV Guide gave the film two out of five stars, noting "A ludicrous melodrama which manages to pull off a couple of gripping scenes."

FilmInk said "It's short, taut and lots of fun; Guillermin's direction is energetic, and there are excellent performances from Kathleen Byron and Reynolds."
