= Dallas Bower =

British film director (1907–1999)

Dallas Bower (25 July 1907 – 18 October 1999) was a British director and producer active during the early development of mass media communication. Throughout his career Bower's work spanned radio plays, television shows, propaganda shorts, animations and feature films, with his most notable projects consisting of Alfred Hitchcock’s first film in sound Blackmail (1929), the British Broadcasting Company's radio play Julius Caesar (1938), the Dunkirk evacuation propaganda short Channel Incident (1940), the feature film Henry V (1944), and an Anglo-French adaptation of Lewis Carroll's children's novel Alice's Adventures in Wonderland entitled Alice au pays des merveilles (1949). He later produced some of the earliest British television commercials.

== Biography ==
=== Personal life ===
Dallas Bower was born on 25 July 1907, in apartment 34 of Kensington Hall Gardens, London. Throughout his childhood Bower frequently visited the Old Royalty Cinema with his uncle, where they saw motion pictures such as The Birth of a Nation (1915) and Intolerance (1916), which Bower would later cite as a significant early influences that would inspire his future involvement in the film industry. Bower was educated at Willington Preparatory School in Putney, and St John's College Hurstpierpoint, where he studied classical literature in addition to contemporary technology. On 18 November 1925, at the age of 18, he married Violet Florence Collings (1906–1999). Together they had two daughters and a son before separating in 1945.

=== Radio career ===
Bower was first introduced to radio by an older student at St John's College who had been working on a small valve set. The pair would soon after establish an amateur radio station based in Bower's grandfather's house in Putney. Following his graduation from St John's College, Bower was employed by the Marconi Scientific Instrument Company, while at the same time he was selected to edit the radio theory and design journals Modern Wireless in 1925 and Experimental Wireless in 1926.

As a prominent figure in the developing British radio industry he was invited to the Radio Society of Great Britain in 1926, where Bower personally heard Campbell Swinton lecture on the topic of cathode ray oscillography, the theory on which modern television transmissions are predicated on. Bower stated that the lecture made a ‘profound impression on him, directly leading to his collaborations with the British developer and radio physicist Robert Watson-Watt. Bower's meetings with Watt convinced him to enter the world of cinema, as the newfound technological advancements of the 1920s made the type of ambitious projects Bower envisioned feasible.

=== Early cinematic career ===
In 1927 Bower was hired as a sound recordist for British International Pictures (BIP), located in Elstree, London. In this position Bower recorded audio for a multitude of the company's projects, the most notable inclusions being Harry Lachman’s Under the Greenwood Tree (1929) and Alfred Hitchcock’s first movie filmed with dialogue, Blackmail (1929). However, Dallas was forced to leave BIP the same year due to the Great Depression and the BPI's efforts to make the division more economical.

In 1930 Stoll Pictures hired Dallas Bower to continue sound recording for the director and first university professor of film, Thorold Dickinson. Throughout this period Dickinson educated Bower on the principles of sound editing, which Bower utilised when given the opportunity to edit the scoring for the film Q-Ships (1930), a drama set in the First World War. The success of Q-Ships allowed him to quickly transition from sound editor into film editing, with his first project being Midnight Sister (1930) a comedy produced by the Pathé Film Company.

In 1933 Reginal Smith, the founder of Riverside Studios, offered Bower a directorial position on the feature film The Path of Glory (1934) a satirical take on the war genre, however, the film was lost over time and is currently listed as one of the British Film Institute’s 75 Most Wanted lost films. The Path of Glory’s success put Bower into close association with Paul Czinner, a Hungarian director who had fled Nazi-Germany and required an assistant director to aid in communication. In the role of assistant director Bower assisted in the pre-production and on-set filming of Czinner’s films Escape me Never (1935) and As You Like It (1936), until their partnership ended when Bower joined the British Broadcasting Corporation.

=== Involvement with the British Broadcasting Corporation ===
In May 1936 Dallas Bower and Stephen Thomas were appointed as senior producers of the British Broadcasting Corporation (BBC) by Gerald Cock, the first Director of Television for the BBC. Bower, who worked with Cock at BIP, was tasked with adapting ‘high culture’ to the developing mediums of mass communication, in the form of radio plays, short films and television shows. In this position Bower was accredited with the production of the programmes Television Comes to London (1936), Television Demonstration Film (1937), Julius Caesar (1938), Checkmate (1938), and Rope (1939), the majority of which have been completely or partially lost to time.

He had additionally been working on a screenplay for an adaption of Shakespeare’s Henry V, set in a Fascist state; however, the BBC halted all services before the script’s completion due to Nazi Germany’s invasion of Poland in September 1939.

=== World War II ===
Due to the outbreak of World War II, Bower was commissioned into the Royal Corps of Signals, where he was posted to a training brigade located in Whitby. However, relatively soon into the conflict Bower was transferred into the Ministry of Information, which produced propaganda for the British war effort. Bower’s role in the Ministry was equivalent to that of an executive producer. One of Bower’s first pieces of propaganda was Channel Incident (1940) a short film based on the Dunkirk Evacuation of British troops, reportedly Channel Incident was one of Prime Minister Winston Churchill’s favourite propaganda pieces.

In addition, he was responsible for the production of the radio play Alexander Nevsky’ (1941), a project which was commissioned in correlation with the Soviet’s entry into WWII, as well as Columbus, another radio play to celebrate the 450th anniversary of the European's arrival in America.

Over the course of the conflict Bower continued to work and reconfigure the script for Henry V, creating a more traditional appropriation. The final script was bought by Filippo del Giudice in 1944, causing Bower to resign from the Ministry to attach himself to the project.

=== Film career ===
Following his resignation from the Ministry of Information, Bower initially envisioned himself as the director for ‘Henry V’, however, due to a multitude of setbacks the lead actor Sir Laurence Olivier took his position, while Bower remained on the project as an Associate Producer. Bower contributed significantly to the film throughout production, writing the original screenplay, approving all further edits, sourcing the film’s composer, and securing the services of BAFTA award-winning cinematographer Robert Krasker. Ultimately, the film was a critical and financial success.

Bower’s follow-up project was an Anglo-French adaptation of Alice in Wonderland, which he signed-on to after being approached by a French film crew in search of a British director. The film was only released in France and the United States to mixed audience reception and an underwhelming box office due, in part, to Walt Disney’s release of Alice in Wonderland at a similar time.

Bower directed two more films: The Second Mrs Tanquerary (1952), which was filmed over the course of eight days in the Adelphi Theatre for under £25,000, and Doorway to Suspicion. Both films received negative reviews and had a minimal impact at the box office.

=== Later career and death ===
After retiring from the director's chair, Bower began work on the production of the earliest television commercials under the company TV Advertising. Over this period Bower produced 80 commercials, directing 12 of them. He found the new avenue of work taxing, leading to his retirement in the mid-1960s.

After retiring from commercials Bower was never again involved in production or directing, continuing to his death from heart failure in London on 18 October 1999.

== Preservation ==
The majority of Bower's work has been lost over time, due to both degradation and the purposeful melting down of the cellulose nitrate prints to extract small amounts of silver during the Second World War, leading to the placement of some of Bower's projects in the British Film Institute's 75 Most Wanted lost films.

In the case of Alice in Wonderland, fifty years after the film's initial release, the Museum of Modern Art in New York restored the film, which had been damaged due to negligent storage.

== Selected filmography ==
=== Director ===
- The Path of Glory (1934)
- Rope (TV movie) (1939)
- Alice in Wonderland (1949)
- The Second Mrs Tanqueray (1952)
- Doorway to Suspicion (1957)

=== Soundman ===
- Blackmail (1929)
- Under the Greenwood Tree (1929)

=== Editor ===
- Q-Ships (1929)
- Dick Turpin (1933)
