= Alice in Wonderland (1949 film) =

- French theatrical release poster
- Directed by: Dallas Bower
- Written by: Edward Eliscu; Albert E. Lewin; Henry Myers
- Based on: Alice's Adventures in Wonderland by Lewis Carroll
- Produced by: Lou Bunin; J. Arthur Rank (uncredited)
- Starring: Stephen Murray; Carol Marsh; Raymond Bussières
- Cinematography: Gerald Gibbs; Claude Renoir
- Edited by: Inman Hunter
- Music by: Sol Kaplan (London Symphony Orchestra); Ernest Irving (Philharmonia Orchestra)
- Production companies: Lou Bunin Productions; Punch Films (II); The Rank Organisation; Union Générale Cinématographique (UGC)
- Distributed by: L'Alliance Générale de Distribution Cinématographique
- Release date: 13 May 1949 (France)
- Running time: 83 minutes
- Country: France
- Language: English

Alice in Wonderland (French: Alice au pays des merveilles) is a 1949 French film based on Lewis Carroll's 1865 fantasy novel Alice's Adventures in Wonderland. Directed by Dallas Bower, the film stars Carol Marsh as Alice, Stephen Murray as Lewis Carroll, and Raymond Bussières as The Tailor. Most of the Wonderland characters are portrayed by stop-motion animated puppets created by Lou Bunin.

All of the other live actors in the film are seen only in the live-action scenes. However, they lend their voices to the Wonderland characters, and the staging of the scenes in England vs. the scenes in Wonderland is reminiscent of the Kansas scenes vs. the Oz scenes in the 1939 film The Wizard of Oz in that several of the live-action characters seem to have counterparts (of sorts) in Wonderland. Among the other live actors are Pamela Brown as the Queen and as the voice of the Queen of Hearts. Stephen Murray is seen as Lewis Carroll and provides the voice of the Knave of Hearts, and Felix Aylmer, who played Polonius in Laurence Olivier's Hamlet, plays Dr. Liddell, father of Alice Liddell, the real-life inspiration for Alice; he also provides the voice of the Cheshire Cat.

The live-action sequences were shot in both English and French versions. Due to Disney's pre-existing arrangement with Technicolor, the movie had to be filmed with the inferior Ansco colouring process instead.

Carol Marsh was 20 years old when she played the part of Alice - conceived by the novel's author as 7 years old.

== Plot ==
In Victorian England, Charles Dodgson is a scholar and teacher at Christ Church, Oxford who enjoys photography, cinema, and spending time with the young daughters of Dr. Liddell, the Dean. The stuffy Vice Chancellor thinks little of Dodgson and is appalled at the subject of his latest poem (written under the pen name Lewis Carroll), suggesting that Oxford's famous bell Great Tom be removed as its ringing is a nuisance to many. He fears Dodgson will read it to the Queen, who is soon to be visiting Oxford. On the suggestion of the Vice Chancellor, Alice Liddell and her sisters are not allowed to be present when the Queen arrives as he believes they will make things disorderly. Dodgson feels bad for the disappointed Alice and slips one of the Queen's tarts to her while no one is looking. When he meets the Queen, Dodgson cannot find the courage to tell her his true opinion of Great Tom.

Dodgson takes the Dean's daughters on a boat ride. He begins to tell a story about a little girl named Alice who sees a White Rabbit in a waistcoat looking at a pocket watch. Curious, Alice follows him down a hole. Landing in a room with many doors, Alice discovers a key she uses to open a tiny door through which she spies the Rabbit. In her attempt to get inside the door, Alice uses magical objects that mysteriously appear in the room to change her size. She grows enormously tall and cries at her predicament, then shrinks until she is small enough to enter the door but finds herself floating in a sea of her own tears. Alice meets a mouse, to whom she relates her feelings of delight at the fantastic world she has found herself in.

Upon washing ashore, Alice sees animals having a Caucus Race and debating on the best way to get dry. Blaming Alice for the flood, the animals begin to chase her. Alice encounters the Rabbit again, who mistakes her for his maidservant and tells her to fetch a fan and gloves from his house. Alice takes a bottle from a table in the Rabbit's house and drinks from it. She grows so much that she becomes stuck. The Rabbit orders his gardener, Bill the Lizard, to climb down the chimney to take care of the problem. When that doesn't work, he throws a pebble and it turns into a cake that makes Alice shrink. She escapes the house, which then collapses. The horrified Rabbit and his gardeners join the Caucus Race animals in chase of Alice. The card army of the King and Queen of Hearts inform the animals that the Queen's tarts have been stolen. The Rabbit frames Alice for the theft and everyone agrees that she is responsible. Wandering in the woods, Alice encounters a giant puppy with a bell around its neck and a Caterpillar. She then sees fish footmen carrying an invitation from the Queen to the Duchess to play croquet.

The Knave of Hearts sneaks through the woods carrying the Queen's tarts which he stole. When the Rabbit discovers him, he begs him not to tell the Queen what he did. The Rabbit acts as if he saw nothing as he takes one of the tarts for himself. Alice gains entrance into the house of the operatic Duchess and gives her the Queen's invitation. The Duchess's cook is using too much pepper in her soup, causing everyone to sneeze, making the house explode. The Duchess's baby flies through the air and is caught by Alice. It begins grunting and she discovers it has turned into a pig. She leaves it to wander away. The Cheshire Cat appears and directs Alice to the Hatter, March Hare, and the Dormouse, who are having a tea party. The Hatter leaps onto the table and recites a song he sang at a concert given by the Queen, which the latter disliked, proclaiming he was murdering the time. Alice sees the animals coming and takes off, ending up in the room of doors once again. Entering one, she is at the bottom of the sea where she watches a Lobster Quadrille.

The Rabbit sees three of the Queen's gardeners painting white roses red to cover up their mistake of planting the wrong coloured rose tree. The gardeners plead with the Rabbit not to tell the Queen, saying that he was once in their position. The Rabbit smugly responds that, unlike them, he was clever enough to rise through the ranks and gain favour with the Queen. The King and Queen of Hearts arrive at the croquet court with their entourage. The Rabbit tells the Queen what the gardeners did and they are sent away to be beheaded. The Queen asks Alice to play croquet and then offers her a tart, but finds they are gone. The Rabbit accuses Alice of the crime and the Queen is ready to have her head chopped off, but the King says she needs a trial. In the meantime, the Queen orders Alice to be taken to prison by the Gryphon, who introduces her to the Mock Turtle. Alice is then summoned to her trial, in which absurd and nonsensical evidence is presented. Finally, Alice herself reads out the charge, which states that the Knave of Hearts stole the tarts. He acknowledges the truth of that, but says she is the Knave while he is Alice. The courtroom erupts in chaos as the Queen orders Alice's execution. When Alice screams angrily that they are nothing but a pack of cards, the whole deck flies up and attacks her.

Awakening in the boat, Alice Liddell finds that Charles Dodgson is finishing his story. She insists that everything that happened was real, and then looks over to find the White Rabbit standing on the bank, apparently confirming this. Alice happily follows Dodgson and her sisters home.

== Cast ==
- Stephen Murray as Lewis Carroll/The Knave of Hearts (voice)
- Ernest Milton as The Vice Chancellor/The White Rabbit (voice)
- Pamela Brown as Queen Victoria/The Queen of Hearts (voice)
- Felix Aylmer as Dr. Liddel/The Cheshire Cat (voice)
- David Reed as The Prince Consort/The King of Hearts (voice) (credited as David Read)
- Carol Marsh as Alice
- Joyce Grenfell as Duchess/Dormouse
- Jack Train as Puppet Character (voice)
- Peter Bull as Puppet Character (voice)
- Ivan Staff as Puppet Character (voice)
- Claude Hulbert as Puppet Character (voice)
- Raymond Bussières as The Tailor/The Mad Hatter (voice)

== Release ==
Abbreviated black-and-white version of Alice in Wonderland released by Castle Films in 1953

The film was not released in Britain until 1985, allegedly because Carroll's representation of the Queen of Hearts was seen as too close and too unkind to Queen Victoria, although it was shown on BBC television on 2 April 1961.

The film was not widely seen in the U.S. upon its completion, due to a legal dispute with the Disney Studios, which was making its own full-length animated version of Alice at the same time as the Bower version was being worked on. Disney sued to prevent release of the British version in the U.S., and the case was extensively covered in Time magazine. The company that released the British version accused Disney of trying to exploit their film by releasing its version at virtually the same time.

The Museum of Modern Art restored the film on a 35mm print in a rare 2009 screening.

The film was released on VHS in 1989 by Interglobal Home Video in North America. Re-released in 1992, Monterey Home Video. In 2016, American Pop Classic released the film on DVD.

== Reception ==
Leonard Maltin gave the film 2 stars calling it a "static adaptation" and stating that "most of the wit and charm are missing".
