= Black 13 =

1953 film by Ken Hughes

- Film poster
- Directed by: Ken Hughes
- Written by: Pietro Germi; Ken Hughes
- Produced by: Roger Proudlock
- Starring: Peter Reynolds; Rona Anderson; Patrick Barr; Lana Morris
- Cinematography: Gerald Gibbs
- Edited by: Sam Simmonds
- Music by: Carlo Rustichelli
- Production company: Vandyke Productions
- Distributed by: Archway Film Distributors (United Kingdom); 20th Century Fox (United States)
- Release dates: November 1953; 7 November 1954
- Running time: 75 minutes
- Country: United Kingdom
- Language: English

Black 13 (alsnown as Dangerous Youth) is a 1953 British crime drama film directed by Ken Hughes and starring Peter Reynolds, Rona Anderson, Patrick Barr and John Le Mesurier. It was written by Pietro Germi and Hughes, and is a remake of the 1948 Italian film Gioventù perduta (also known as Lost Youth) by Germi. It was made by Vandyke Productions.

== Premise ==
The son of a university professor goes on a crime spree, which turns deadly serious when he kills a nightwatchman. The title refers to a roulette wheel.

== Cast ==
- Peter Reynolds as Stephen
- Rona Anderson as Claire
- Patrick Barr as Robert
- Lana Morris as Marion
- Genine Graham as Stella
- Michael Balfour as Joe
- John Forrest as Wally
- Viola Lyel as Mrs. Barclay
- Martin Walker as Professor Barclay
- John Le Mesurier as Inspector
- Martin Benson as Bruno

== Reception ==
The Monthly Film Bulletin wrote: "This British re-make of the Italian film Gioventu Perduta (1948) hardly seems to have been worth while. As a B-grade thriller the film maintains a certain pace and excitement, but beyond this it is most unsatisfactory. ... Of the performers, Patrick Barr and Rona Anderson are intermittently convincing. Peter Reynolds' wild-eyed neurotic verges at times on the melodrama madman, and never attracts the sympathy which might have given the film some point."

Kine Weekly wrote: "Taut crime melodrama, with intriguing pathological overtones. ... Appropriate night club asides, enlivened by music and song, provide essential colour, while the climax is at once salutary and sentimentally satisfying. Reliable British thick ear."

Picturegoer wrote: "The trick of blending a thriller into a convincing background of human relations nearly comes off in this taut British film. If the plot had matched the excellent acting, this could have been a winner."

Variety wrote: "Twentieth-Fox seemingly imported this inferior British film for exhibs who lack widescreen ... A cast of unknowns isn't helped either by story or direction in the overlong tale."
