= Stars in Your Eyes =

1956 British musical film by Maurice Elvey

- Directed by: Maurice Elvey
- Written by: Hubert Gregg; Francis Miller (story); Talbot Rothwell
- Produced by: David Dent
- Starring: Nat Jackley; Pat Kirkwood; Bonar Colleano; Dorothy Squires; Jack Jackson
- Cinematography: S.D. Onions
- Edited by: Robert Jordan Hill
- Music by: Edwin Astley played by Geraldo (bandleader) and his orchestra
- Production company: Grand Alliance
- Distributed by: British Lion Films
- Release date: 6 December 1956
- Running time: 96 minutes
- Country: United Kingdom
- Language: English

Stars in Your Eyes is a 1956 British musical film directed by Maurice Elvey and starring Nat Jackley, Pat Kirkwood and Bonar Colleano. It was written by Hubert Gregg and Talbot Rothwell from a story by Francis Miller.

== Plot ==
As the world of vaudeville gradually loses its attraction, more and more entertainers are losing their jobs. In hopes of fixing their financial problems, a group of entertainers band together and buy a run-down theatre to attract customers by showcasing their various talents on the grand opening night. Along the way their show is threatened by a gang of crooks but the show finishes successfully with each entertainer given a happy ending.

== Cast ==
- Nat Jackley as Jimmy Knowles
- Pat Kirkwood as Sally Bishop
- Bonar Colleano as David Laws
- Dorothy Squires as Ann Hart
- Jack Jackson as Cecil Rigby
- Vera Day as Maureen Temple
- Hubert Gregg as Crawley Walters
- Joan Sims as Walter's secretary
- Ernest Clark as Ronnie
- Gerald Harper as Dicky
- Meier Tzelniker as Maxie Jago
- Gabrielle Brune as Effie
- Aubrey Dexter as Farrow
- Roger Avon as Grimes
- Jimmy Clitheroe as Joey

== Reception ==
The Monthly Film Bulletin wrote: "Although it includes a few passable songs and dances, this British musical relies almost entirely on the usual hoary conventions – back stage misunderstandings, last minute success, etc. – and the production is insufficiently inventive to raise the material out of its depressingly familiar rut. Nat Jackley contributes some very broad humour and the other players work hard, notably Hubert Gregg, who, apart from writing the two best songs, is occasionally amusing as the TV producer."

Variety wrote: "Many of the skits have the broad vulgarity of touring burlesque revues and circus clowning, and Pat Kirkwood's numbers savor too much of the good old days for modern appeal. Jackley's grotesque comedy should amuse and register best with provincial audiences. Colleano gives a straight, sympathetic performance as the reformed spouse, with Dorothy Squires providing the glamor and torch singing as his ex-mate. Hubert Gregg scores with a satirical impression of a radio program arranger, and most of the supporting characters ring true."
