= Ray Elton =

British cinematographer

- Born: 28 January 1914; Cardiff, Wales; United Kingdom
- Died: 7 May 1994 (aged 80); London, England; United Kingdom
- Other name: Samuel Raymond Elton
- Occupations: Cinematographer, Producer
- Years active: 1937 - 1981 (film)

Ray Elton (28 January 1914 – 7 May 1994) was a British cinematographer. Elton was employed by Sydney Box's documentary unit Verity Films during the Second World War. He later worked on several Gainsborough Pictures films, once Box took over the running of the studio.

== Selected filmography ==
- The Blind Goddess (1948)
- Miranda (1948)
- A Boy, a Girl and a Bike (1949)
- Last Holiday (1950)
- Smart Alec (1951)
- Two on the Tiles (1951)
- Song of Paris (1952)

== Bibliography ==
- Spicer, Andrew. Sydney Box. Manchester University Press, 2006.
