= Johnny on the Run =

1953 film by Lewis Gilbert

- Directed by: Lewis Gilbert
- Written by: Patricia Lathan
- Based on: an idea by George Sturt
- Produced by: Lewis Gilbert
- Starring: Eugeniusz Chylek; Sydney Tafler
- Cinematography: Gerald Gibbs
- Edited by: Monica Kimick
- Music by: Antony Hopkins
- Production company: International Realist
- Distributed by: Associated British Film Distributors (UK)
- Release date: June 1953 (UK)
- Running time: 68 mins.
- Country: United Kingdom
- Language: English

Johnny on the Run is a 1953 British children's adventure film directed by Lewis Gilbert and starring Eugeniusz Chylek and Sydney Tafler. It was written by Patricia Lathan and produced by the Children's Film Foundation.

The film includes documentary footage of streets in the south side of Edinburgh in the early 1950s and of rural Perthshire.

== Plot ==
In Edinburgh, young Polish boy Janek/Johnny lives with his aunt and cousins. He feels an outcast in the home. One day, when he is out pushing his baby cousin in a pram, a group of boys start to taunt him about being Polish, and a fight begins, during which the pram rolls off. Janek chases after it with a growing crowd chasing. He catches the pram at the head of a flight of steps. His aunt materialises and calls him a wicked boy. The crowd mills behind her. Janek is scared and runs off through the alleys. He ends on Princes Street and sees a poster for trips to his homeland of Poland at a travel agent. He goes in and is told the cheapest way to travel is a ship from Dundee to Danzig, which costs £17.

He sneaks into the back of a removal lorry labelled Dundee. Arriving at night, he encounters two thieves trying to break into a house. They tell him that they have lost their key and get him to climb in the fanlight to unlock the door. They get him to wait in the hall while they steal a brooch from a safe. The phone rings, and they are startled. They run off just as a policeman arrives. The men split, and one takes Janek. They get a lift north in the back of a lorry, but start to fight and fall out.

In the middle of the night, they go to a remote cottage where an old man lets them sleep on his floor. Janek runs off while they sleep, going further north. He shelters in a ruined castle, and the next day, a group of children find him and take him to their special school in Perthshire. The children call him Johnny.

The headmaster takes his photo, and he appears in the newspaper, which asks, "Do you know this boy?"

Back in Edinburgh, the police see the photo and ask his aunt why she never reported the boy as missing. The crooks also see the newspaper and head north to find Janek because they hid the brooch in his jacket. They find the school and search for the brooch in the school safe.

Meanwhile, Janek heads a paper chase cross-country run. The police arrive and interview the headmaster. The girls (who are not part of the paper chase) explore the lockers and find the brooch. A little black girl decides to wear it because Janek likes her.

The crooks join the cross-country race and catch Janek in a church with one of the girls who has the brooch. Janek rings the church bell, and everyone, including the police, arrives.

His aunt comes, but Janek says he wants to stay at the school.

== Cast ==
- Eugeniusz Chylek as Janek (Johnny)
- Sydney Tafler as 'Flash Harry' Fisher
- Michael Balfour as 'Fingers' Brown
- Jean Anderson as Mrs. MacIntyre
- Moultrie Kelsall as Mr. MacIntyre
- Mona Washbourne as Mrs. MacGregor
- Margaret McCourt as Janet MacGregor
- Keith Faulkner as Kenneth MacGregor
- Cleo Sylvestre (Cleopatra Sylvestre) as Susie
- John Laurie as the Edinburgh policeman

== Critical reception ==
The Monthly Film Bulletin wrote: "The idea of setting an adventure story against the background of a Scottish International Children's Village was an excellent one, and has been admirably developed. Although some of the familiar ingredients are here – the stolen jewel, the comic crooks, the chase – they have been so ingeniously woven into the pattern of an excellent script, and so well handled, that they have a surprising freshness. The newer elements – a convincingly bad adult (Jan's aunt), a stronger pathos in the scenes of the orphan's isolation and unhappiness than we are used to in children's films (Saturday audiences ought to be made to cry more often), and a more deeply-felt internationalism than hitherto – give strength and purpose to the film without straining the comprehension of the Club audience. The Polish boy who plays the orphan has a handsome, expressive face and is a real discovery; the other children, although well chosen, appear amateurish by comparison, but the adults have individuality and are nicely contrasted bs"

Kine Weekly wrote: "Pleasant, swift-moving adventure story."

The Daily Film Renter wrote: "Eugeniusz Chylek is a thoughtful leading boy. His acting is clear-cut and his actions natural-seeming. Sydney Tafler is a far from heavy "wide boy," this characterisation being keyed along lines of bungling naiveté (only a fool would be a crook), while Michael Balfour is certain to make the tinies laugh with his slapstick incompetence when faced with the simplest fence to climb."

TV Guide gave the film three out of five stars, writing: "This well-paced film is particularly strong in its realistic depiction of children."
