= Song of Paris =

- Finnish poster
- Directed by: John Guillermin
- Written by: Allan MacKinnon
- Produced by: Roger Proudlock
- Starring: Dennis Price; Anne Vernon; Mischa Auer; Hermione Baddeley
- Cinematography: Ray Elton
- Edited by: Sam Simmonds
- Music by: Philip Martell; Bruce Campbell
- Production company: Vandyke Productions
- Distributed by: Adelphi Films; Lippert Pictures (US)
- Release dates: 11 February 1952 (UK); 17 April 1953 (US)
- Running time: 83 minutes
- Country: United Kingdom
- Language: English
- Budget: £24,000
- Box office: over £30,000 (Britain)

Song of Paris is a 1952 British comedy film directed by John Guillermin and starring Dennis Price, Anne Vernon and Hermione Baddeley. It was shot at Walton Studios outside London. It was distributed in the United States by Lippert Pictures as Bachelor in Paris.

== Premise ==
English businessman Matthew Ibbetson travels to Paris and becomes involved with Clementine, a cabaret star.

== Cast ==
- Dennis Price as Matthew Ibbetson
- Anne Vernon as Clementine
- Mischa Auer as Comte Marcel de Sarliac
- Hermione Baddeley as Mrs. Ibbetson
- Joan Kenny as Jenny Ibbetson
- Brian Worth as Jim Barrett
- Michael Ward as Waterson
- Richard Wattis as Carter
- Kynaston Reeves as Vicar
- Roger Maxwell as Weldon
- Bernard Rebel as Lebrun
- Tessa Prendergast as Seven Veils Dancer
- Anton Diffring as Renoir
- Marcel Poncin as Martin
- Andreas Malandrinos as Manet
- David Keir as Doctor
- Armand Guinle as Tiboux
- Leonard Sharp as Cleaner
- David Davies as Police Constable
- Simone Silva as Marie-Louise

== Production ==
Adelphi invested £17,490 of the budget.

== Critical reception ==
Amongst contemporary reviews, the News of the World wrote "Pretty blondes suddenly lose their skirts and pompous aristocrats are deprived of their pants. Such fun!" whereas Variety thought it "completely unsubtle in its approach;" and more recently, TV Guide concluded "Auer's antics provide most of the laughs in this tame effort," and rated it 2/5 stars.
