= Swiss Honeymoon =

1947 British film

- Directed by: Henry C. James; Jan Sikorski
- Written by: Henry C. James; W.M. Sibley
- Produced by: W.M. Sibley
- Cinematography: Jan Sikorski
- Production company: International Artists
- Distributed by: New Realm
- Release date: 1947
- Running time: 63 mins
- Country: United Kingdom
- Language: English

Swiss Honeymoon is a 1947 British second feature ('B') film directed by Henry C. James and Jan Sikorski. It was written by James and W.M. Sibley, based on James's 1941 BBC radio series Speak to Me of Love.

== Premise ==
A young couple tours Switzerland on their honeymoon.

== Cast ==
- Percy Marmont as the bridegroom
- Pat Mainwaring as the bride

== Reception ==
The Monthly Film Bulletin wrote: "There are some splendid views of the Matterhorn from Zermatt and at close quarters from the mountain railway up the Riffelalp. Nor are winter sports omitted. But surely there are better ways of 'conducting' a tour of this kind than the introduction of a trite story and a number of people whose activities and conversation, except when of the guidebook variety, can only obstruct the main interest of the film? To judge by the general excellence of the photography and well-chosen selection of scenery, such time might have been more profitably spent."

Kine Weekly wrote: "Artless British travelogue. It is a sincere attempt to get out of the old rut, but in spite of the authenticity of its sweeping panoramas and backgrounds occasionally wears an amateurish look. Tale is weak and could be cut up to advantage.

In British Sound Films: The Studio Years 1928–1959 David Quinlan rated the film as "mediocre", writing: "Makers should've stuck with the lovely scenery and photography and turned in a 30 minute documentary. Story is less than negligible, even with a mountain rescue at the end."
