= Gerald Gibbs (cinematographer) =

English cinematographer

Gerald Ernest Gibbs, BSC (7 November 1907 – 23 January 1990) was an English cinematographer.

== Selected filmography ==
- Cock o' the North (1935)
- The Schooner Gang (1937)
- Welcome, Mr. Washington (1944)
- Don Chicago (1945)
- Loyal Heart (1946)
- No Orchids for Miss Blandish (1948)
- Alice in Wonderland (1949)
- Whisky Galore! (1949)
- High Jinks in Society (1949)
- The Lady from Boston (1951)
- Night Was Our Friend (1951)
- Johnny on the Run (1953)
- There Was a Young Lady (1953)
- The Straw Man (1953)
- Hill 24 Doesn't Answer (1955)
- The Green Man (1956)
- Fortune Is a Woman (1957)
- At the Stroke of Nine (1957)
- Blue Murder at St Trinian's (1957)
- The Safecracker (1958)
- The Man Upstairs (1958)
- Further Up the Creek (1958)
- This Other Eden (1959)
- Left Right and Centre (1959)
- The Pure Hell of St Trinian's (1960)
- A Prize of Arms (1962)
- Station Six-Sahara (1962)
- The Boys (1962 British film)
- A Jolly Bad Fellow (1964)
- The Leather Boys (1964)
- Mister Ten Per Cent (1967)
