= Sam Simmonds (film editor) =

British film editor

Sam Simmonds was a British film editor who worked on over thirty productions between 1927 and 1956. For a number of years he worked for the Rank Organisation in various capacities.

== Selected filmography ==
- Poppies of Flanders (1927)
- Tommy Atkins (1928)
- The American Prisoner (1929)
- Young Woodley (1930)
- Harmony Heaven (1930)
- Loose Ends (1930)
- The Flame of Love (1930)
- The Middle Watch (1930)
- Let's Love and Laugh (1931)
- Mr. Bill the Conqueror (1932)
- Old Roses (1935)
- The Deputy Drummer (1935)
- The Man Behind the Mask (1936)
- The Early Bird (1936)
- Rhythm Racketeer (1937)
- Sing as You Swing (1937)
- The Man at the Gate (1941)
- Hard Steel (1942)
- The Great Mr. Handel (1942)
- They Knew Mr. Knight (1946)
- Mister Drake's Duck (1951)
- Song of Paris (1952)
- The Second Mrs. Tanqueray (1952)
- Black 13 (1953)
- Time Is My Enemy (1954)
- Miss Tulip Stays the Night (1955)
- See How They Run (1955)
- Not So Dusty (1956)

== Bibliography ==
- MacNab, Geoffrey. J. Arthur Rank and the British Film Industry. Routledge, 1993.
