= Roger Proudlock =

British film producer (1920–2003)

- Born: 20 June 1920; United Kingdom
- Died: 2003 (aged 82–83); Hove, East Sussex, United Kingdom
- Occupation: Producer
- Years active: 1947–1960 (film)

Roger Proudlock (1920–2003) was a British film producer associated with Vandyke Productions, which specialised in making low-budget second features during the late 1940s and 1950s.

He attended Eton College and later served during the Second World War. In 1947 he founded Vandyke with his younger brother Nigel.

== Filmography ==
- The Hangman Waits (1947)
- Death in the Hand (1948)
- Panic at Madame Tussaud's (1948)
- The Strangers Came (1949)
- A Matter of Murder (1949)
- The Six Men (1951)
- Smart Alec (1951)
- Two on the Tiles (1951)
- Four Days (1951)
- Song of Paris (1952)
- The Second Mrs. Tanqueray (1952)
- Strange Stories (1953)
- Black 13 (1953)
- Adventure in the Hopfields (1954)
- Time Is My Enemy (1954)
- Dead on Time (1955)
- They Can't Hang Me (1955)
- Light Fingers (1957)
- The Spaniard's Curse (1958)
- Just Joe (1960)
- Not a Hope in Hell (1960)

== Bibliography ==
- Chibnall, Steve & McFarlane, Brian. The British 'B' Film. Palgrave MacMillan, 2009.
