= Vandyke Productions =

British film company

- Industry: Film production
- Founded: 1947; 79 years ago
- Founders: Nigel Proudlock; Roger Proudlock
- Defunct: 1956

Vandyke Productions was a British film production company which operated between 1947 and 1956. It specialised in making B films which would be released on the bottom-half of a double bill.

Founded by the brothers Nigel and Roger Proudlock in 1947 after their demobilisation, the company used several studios during its existence including Walton and Kensington. Often operating on very low-budgets, during its first few years the company produced a mix of thrillers and comedies. Some of its films of the 1950s were slightly more expensive including Black 13, which was released in the United States by 20th Century Fox. John Guillermin, who went on to be a Hollywood director, made several films for Vandyke early in his career. The company went out of business in 1956 due to a slump in B Film production, but Roger Proudlock returned to make a few more films until 1960.

== Bibliography ==
- Chibnall, Steve & McFarlane, Brian. The British 'B' Film. Palgrave MacMillan, 2009.
