= 1951 in British radio =

This is a list of events from British radio in 1951.

== Events ==
- 1 January – The Archers series debuts nationally on the BBC Light Programme; it will still be broadcast 75 years later as the world's longest-running radio "soap".
- 28 May–20 September – The BBC Home Service broadcasts comedy series Crazy People, predecessor of The Goon Show, created and written by Spike Milligan, who performs it with Harry Secombe, Peter Sellers and Michael Bentine.
- 2 July – The English language programmes of Radio Luxembourg move from long wave to the medium wave frequency of 208 metres (1439 kHz) and begins serialising the adventures of science fiction comic hero Dan Dare.
- August – Tony Hancock joins the cast of Educating Archie as Archie's tutor (until January 1952).

== Debuts ==
- 28 May – The Goon Show (as Crazy People), on the BBC Home Service (1951–1960)
- 2 July – The New Adventures of Dan Dare, Pilot of the Future, on Radio Luxembourg (1951–1956)
- 3 August – The Adventures of Harry Lime made by Towers of London and broadcast on the BBC Home Service (1951–1952)

== Continuing radio programmes ==
=== 1930s ===
- In Town Tonight (1933–1960)

=== 1940s ===
- Music While You Work (1940–1967)
- Sunday Half Hour (1940–2018)
- Desert Island Discs (1942–Present)
- Family Favourites (1945–1980)
- Down Your Way (1946–1992)
- Have A Go (1946–1967)
- Housewives' Choice (1946–1967)
- Letter from America (1946–2004)
- Woman's Hour (1946–Present)
- Twenty Questions (1947–1976)
- Any Questions? (1948–Present)
- Mrs Dale's Diary (1948–1969)
- Take It from Here (1948–1960)
- Billy Cotton Band Show (1949–1968)
- A Book at Bedtime (1949–Present)
- Ray's a Laugh (1949–1961)

=== 1950s ===
- Educating Archie (1950–1960)
- Listen with Mother (1950–1982)

== Births ==
- 2 February – Ken Bruce, Scottish radio presenter
- 26 February – John Waite, radio presenter
- 1 March – Mike Read, DJ
- 13 May – James Whale, radio presenter (died 2025)
- 14 May – Max Reinhardt, music presenter
- 24 June – David Rodigan, DJ
- 28 July – Claire Benedict, Antiguan-born actress
- 9 August – James Naughtie, Scottish journalist and radio presenter
- 4 September – David Renwick, comedy scriptwriter
- 10 September – Sally Grace, actress
- 20 September – John Lloyd, comedy producer

== See also ==
- 1951 in British music
- 1951 in British television
- 1951 in the United Kingdom
- List of British films of 1951
