= Mike Law =

Mike Law may refer to:

- Mike Law (Canadian football) (1942–2021), Canadian football defensive back
- Mike Law (lacrosse) (born 1979), former lacrosse player and political candidate in the state of Colorado
- Mike Law (climber) (born c. 1969), Australian rockclimber

== See also ==
- Michael Andrew Law (born 1982), Hong Kong artist
- Michael Laws (born 1957), New Zealand politician, broadcaster and writer/columnist
