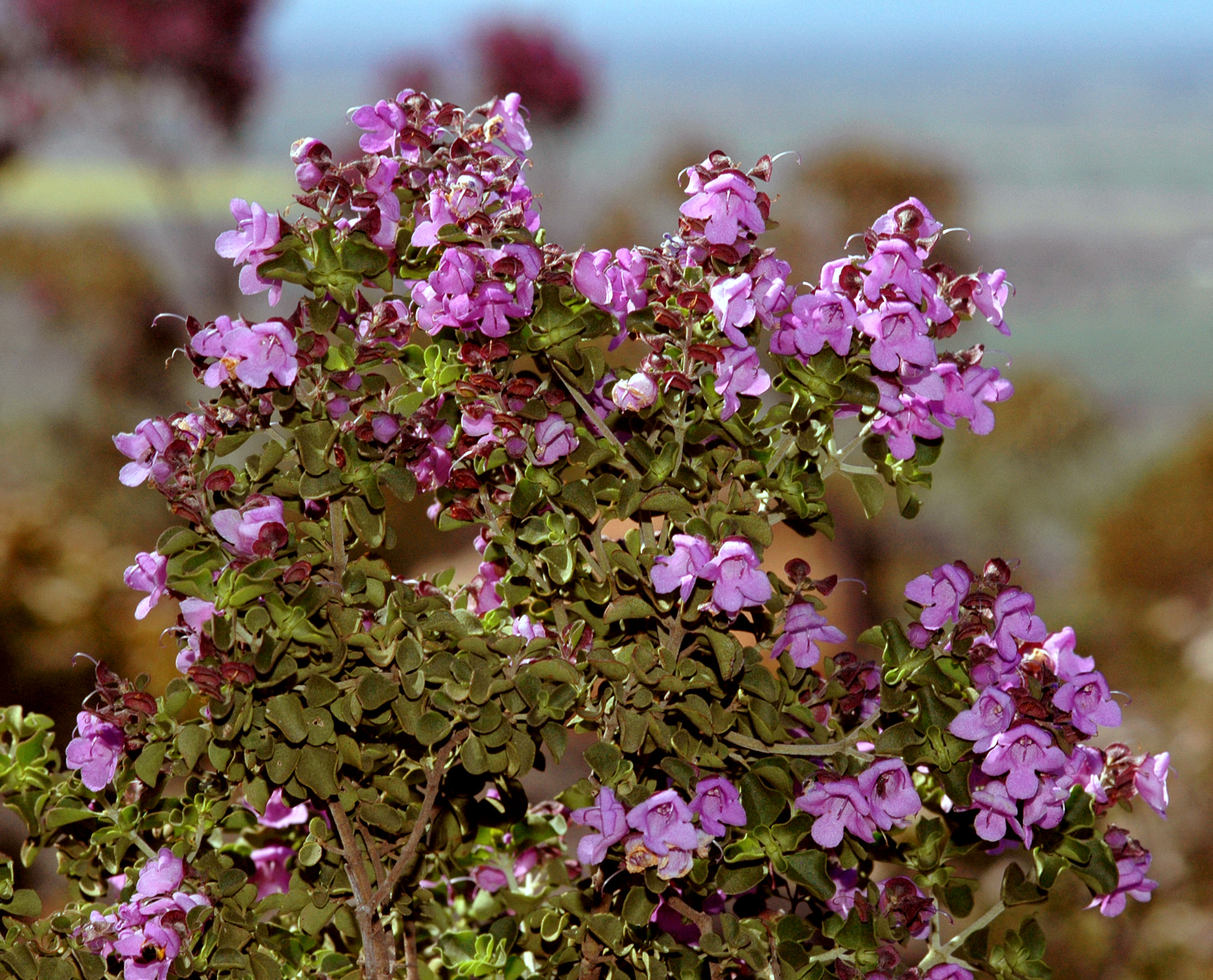
- Mount Arapiles-Tooan State Park, Western Victoria, Australia

Scientific classification
- Kingdom: Plantae
- Clade: Tracheophytes
- Clade: Angiosperms
- Clade: Eudicots
- Clade: Asterids
- Order: Lamiales
- Family: Lamiaceae
- Genus: Prostanthera
- Species: P. rotundifolia

Binomial name
- Prostanthera rotundifolia R.Br.
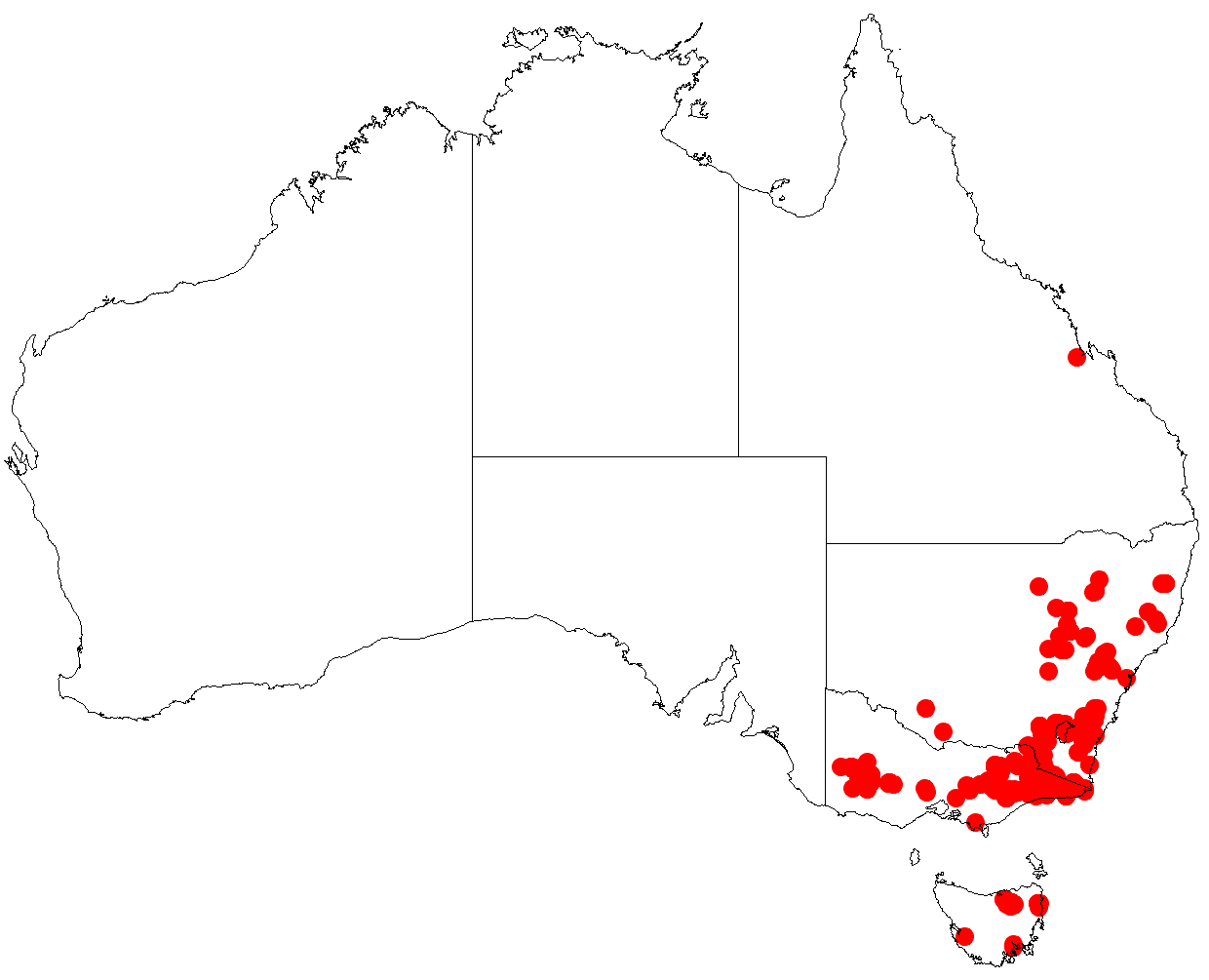
- Occurrence data from AVH

= Prostanthera rotundifolia =

Round-leaved mintbush

Species of plant

Prostanthera rotundifolia, commonly known as round-leaved mintbush or round-leaf mint-bush is a species of flowering plant in the mint family Lamiaceae, and is endemic to south-eastern Australia. It is an erect shrub with aromatic branches covered with short hairs and glands, egg-shaped to more or less round leaves and purple to mauve or pinkish flowers on the ends of branchlets.

== Description ==
Prostanthera rotundifolia is an erect, compact to spreading shrub that typically grows to 0.5–3 m (1 ft 8 in – 9 ft 10 in) high and 1.5–2.5 m (4 ft 11 in – 8 ft 2 in) wide with aromatic branches that are covered with short hairs and sessile glands. The leaves are egg-shaped to more or less round, 3–20 mm (0.12–0.79 in) long and 3–15 mm (0.12–0.59 in) wide on a petiole 2–8 mm (0.079–0.315 in) long. The flowers are arranged in leaf axils near the ends of branchlets with bracteoles 1–2 mm (0.039–0.079 in) but that fall off as the flower develops. The sepals are 4–5 mm (0.16–0.20 in) long forming a tube 2–3.5 mm (0.079–0.138 in) long with two lobes, the upper lobe 1.5–2 mm (0.059–0.079 in) long. The petals are purple to pinkish and 2–8 mm (0.079–0.315 in) long forming a cup-shaped tube. Flowering occurs from September to November.

== Taxonomy and naming ==
Prostanthera rotundifolia was first formally described in 1810 by Robert Brown in his treatise Prodromus Florae Novae Hollandiae et Insulae Van Diemen. The specific epithet rotundifolia means "rounded leaves".

== Distribution and habitat ==
Round-leaved mintbush is widespread and locally common in woodland, forest and rainforest margins, often in rocky places in the eastern half of New South Wales and the southern half of Victoria. It also occurs in northern and eastern Tasmania but where it is less common and is listed as "vulnerable" under the Tasmanian Government Threatened Species Protection Act 1995.

== Use in horticulture ==
In cultivation the species and the cultivar ‘Rosea’ have gained the Royal Horticultural Society's Award of Garden Merit.
