= 1951 in British music =

See also 1951 in the United Kingdom

The cultural year was dominated by the Festival of Britain and the opening of The Royal Festival Hall, the first dedicated concert hall of its size to be built in London since 1893: located on the south bank of the Thames, this was to host concerts by major orchestras from Britain and abroad. The Festival itself was a celebration of music, art and theatre. It notably provided an opportunity for the staging of many events seen during the first Folk music Festival held in Edinburgh, organised with the help of such talents as the American Alan Lomax, the Irish traditional musician Seamus Ennis and the political theatre director Ewan MacColl, who would go on to form the Ballad and Blues Club.

Opera and other forms of classical music, while mainly attractive to a middle class audience, were popular in concert and on the radio. Operas sung in English struck a note of patriotism in a nation still recovering from the Second World War and then engaged in the Korea.

The biggest selling artists on both sides of the Atlantic were Bing Crosby and Doris Day but British singers such as Gracie Fields and Vera Lynn were also very popular, receiving radio play and performing in many live venues.

A style of jazz known as Trad or Traditional Jazz, or sometimes called the Dixieland sound was emerging, drawing for its inspiration the old New Orleans Jazz of an earlier period. The luminaries of this music were people like Ken Colyer who had formed the Crane River Jazz Band which included Chris Barber and later a banjo player called Lonnie Donegan who would introduce a musical style from America called skiffle which would influence the musical career of a young John Lennon. However, the seeds of rock and roll could not even be glimpsed in the UK of 1951.

Trad jazz was a reaction to the big band jazz of the previous decade with its 20 or sometimes even 40 member orchestras named after the band leaders such as Joe Loss and Kenny Baker. The latter were still popular in 1951 and played a form of jazz called Swing. Paramount among the band leaders of this time was Ted Heath whose Orchestra regularly featured on BBC radio programmes. They were an essential part of the nightclub scene in the big cities of the time and were heavily influenced by their American counterparts such as Benny Goodman and Duke Ellington. The smaller Trad Jazz groups in contrast included such then unknowns as George Melly and Acker Bilk, who had recently moved to London to play with Ken Colyer's band.

== Events ==
- 1 January – Composer William Walton is knighted in the 1951 New Year Honours List, while soprano Joan Cross receives the CBE. Other musicians honoured include chorus master and conductor Herbert Bardgett (OBE).
- 3 May – A dedication concert opens the Royal Festival Hall, followed the next day by a concert conducted by Sir Malcolm Sargent attended by King George VI.
- 7 May – Michael Tippett's The Heart's Assurance is given its first performance at the Wigmore Hall by Benjamin Britten and Peter Pears.
- 2–14 July – The seventh annual Cheltenham Music Festival is held in Cheltenham, England, with a performance of Brian Easdale's opera, The Sleeping Children, premieres of the first symphonies of Malcolm Arnold, John Gardner and Arnold van Wyk, together with Franz Reizenstein's Serenade for Winds and Maurice Jacobson's Symphonic Suite, as well as performances of works by Humphrey Searle, Robert Masters, Benjamin Frankel and Philip Sainton.
- 14–21 July – The Haslemere Music Festival, consisting of six concerts of early music, takes place in Haslemere, England.
- 17–22 September – The fourth annual Swansea Festival of Music and the Arts opens in Swansea, Wales, with a controversial speech by one of Wales's leading composers, Daniel Jones. The festival is the final component in the Festival of Britain and consists of seven programmes, featuring Welsh composer Arwel Hughes's new oratorio St. David and appearances by Victoria de los Ángeles, Zino Francescatti, André Navarra, Walter Susskind and Jean Martinon.
- 22 October – Reopening of the Royal Opera House, Covent Garden, with a production of Puccini's Turandot, conducted by Sir John Barbirolli and with Gertrude Grob-Prandl in the title role.
- 1 December – Premiere of Billy Budd at the Royal Opera House, conducted by the composer, Benjamin Britten.

== Popular music ==
- Billy Cotton Band, featuring Anne Shelton – "The Petite Waltz"
- Teddy Johnson & Donald Peers – "Beloved, Be Faithful"
- Lita Roza – "Allentown Jail"

== Classical music: new works ==
- Malcolm Arnold – English Dances for Orchestra, Op. 33
- Howard Ferguson – Piano Concerto in D
- Gerald Finzi – All This Night
- Dean Goffin – 'Symphony of Thanksgiving'
- Gordon Jacob – Concerto for Flute and Strings
- Edmund Rubbra – String Quartet No. 2 in E flat, Op. 73

== Opera ==
- Benjamin Britten – Billy Budd, with libretto by E. M. Forster and Eric Crozier
- Imogen Holst – Benedick and Beatrice
- George Lloyd – John Socman
- Peter Tranchell – The Mayor of Casterbridge
- Ralph Vaughan Williams – The Pilgrim's Progress

== Film and Incidental music ==
- Richard Addinsell –
  - Scrooge, starring Alistair Sim.
  - Tom Brown's Schooldays.
- Stanley Black – Laughter in Paradise, starring Alastair Sim, Fay Compton, George Cole and Guy Middleton.
- John Wooldridge – Blackmailed, starring Mai Zetterling, Dirk Bogarde, Fay Compton and Robert Flemyng.

== Musical theatre ==
- 16 February – Gay's The Word London production opens at the Saville Theatre and runs for 504 performances
- 8 March – Kiss Me, Kate (Cole Porter) – London production opens at the Coliseum and runs for 501 performances
- 3 October – See You Later (Sandy Wilson) London production opens at the Watergate Theatre.
- 17 October – And So To Bed (Vivian Ellis) London production opens at the New Theatre and runs for 323 performances
- 20 October – Zip Goes A Million London production opened at the Palace Theatre and runs for 544 performances

== Births ==
- 4 January – Ronald Corp, English priest, composer, and conductor
- 15 January – Biff Byford, singer (Saxon)
- 20 January – Ian Hill, bass player (Judas Priest)
- 26 January – Roy Goodman, violinist and conductor
- 27 February – Steve Harley, musician (Steve Harley & Cockney Rebel) (died 2024)
- 1 March – Mike Read, DJ
- 4 March – Chris Rea, singer-songwriter (died 2025)
- 11 April – Paul Fox, singer (The Ruts) (died 2007)
- 14 April – Julian Lloyd Webber, cellist
- 7 May – Bernie Marsden, singer-songwriter, guitarist, and producer
- 8 June – Bonnie Tyler, singer (died 2026)
- 20 June – Philip Sawyers, composer
- 19 August – John Deacon, bassist (Queen)
- 25 August – Rob Halford, singer (Judas Priest)
- 22 September – David Coverdale, singer
- 26 September – Stuart Tosh, drummer, songwriter and vocalist
- 28 September – Jim Diamond, singer and songwriter (died 2015)
- 2 October – Sting, singer and musician
- 29 December – Philip Sparke, composer

== Deaths ==
- 6 March – Ivor Novello, composer and entertainer (born 1893)
- 12 March – Harold Bauer, pianist (born 1873)
- 21 August – Constant Lambert, composer (born 1905)
- 14 November – Richard Henry Walthew, pianist and composer (born 1872)
- 16 November – Dora Bright, pianist and composer (born 1862)
- date unknown
  - Harry Grattan, actor, singer, dancer and writer (born c.1867)
  - Margot Ruddock, actress, poet and singer (born 1907)

== See also ==
- 1951 in British television
- 1951 in the United Kingdom
- List of British films of 1951
