= Kim Carrigan =

Australian rock cllimber

Kim Carrigan (born in 1958) was Australia's leading rock climber during the late 1970s and early 1980s. Carrigan put up several hundred new climbing routes on crags around the country, in particular at Mount Arapiles, in Victoria, where he was based for several years. He repeatedly extended the technical level of Australian climbing, starting in 1978 by free climbing an old aid climbing route Procul Harum to establish the first Australian climb graded 26 under the Ewbank grading system, or 5.12c (7b+). He went on to climb the first grade 27 with Denim, grade 28 with Yesterday, grade 29 with India, and grade 30 with Masada. All of these new routes are located at Mount Arapiles. Later he moved to Switzerland and became a triathlete. In the Swiss alps he did some difficult first ascents with the famous multi-pitch Swiss climber Martin Scheel, including Truth of human desire at the Titlis.
