= Mount Arapiles =

Rock formation in Victoria, Australia

Mount Arapiles (Djurid)
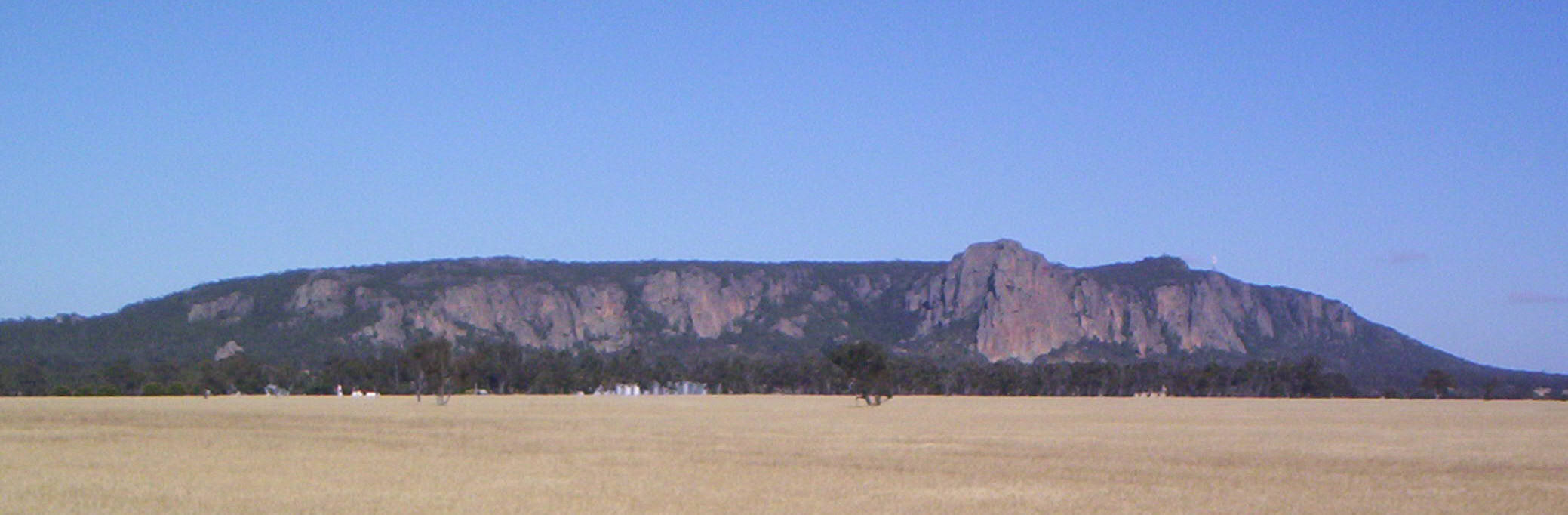

Highest point
- Elevation: 370 metres (1,210 ft) AHD
- Prominence: ~140 metres (460 ft) AHD
- Coordinates: 36°45′3″S 141°49′58″E

Geography
- Location within Victoria
- Location: Wimmera region, Victoria, Australia

Geology
- Mountain type: metamorphic sandstone (quartzite)

Climbing
- First ascent: the first recorded ascent by a European 23 July 1836 by Thomas Mitchell
- Easiest route: Hike/drive

Mount Arapiles is a rock formation that rises about 140 metres (460 ft) above the Wimmera plains in western Victoria, Australia. It is located in Arapiles approximately 10 kilometres (6.2 mi) west of the town of Natimuk and is part of the Mount Arapiles-Tooan State Park. Arapiles is a very popular destination for rock climbers due to the quantity and quality of climbs. It is one of the premier climbing sites in Australia along with the nearby Grampians. The Wotjobaluk name for the formation is Djurid.

== History ==
=== Early history ===
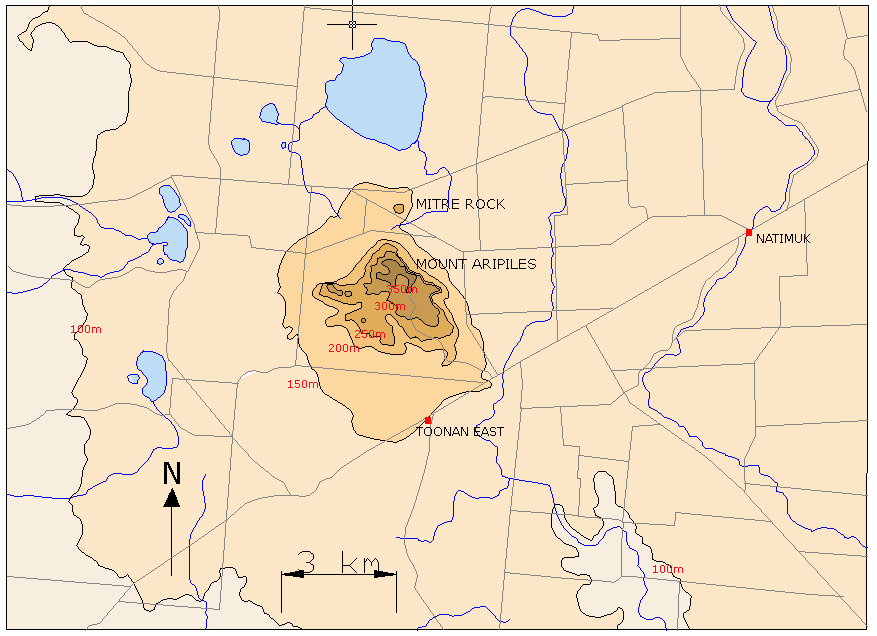
Map of Mount Arapiles, Victoria

The Djurid Baluk clan of the Wotjobaluk people inhabited the nearby area for thousands of years prior to the European colonisation of Australia. They used the mountain's hard sandstone for making various stone tools, and found shelter in its many gullies and small caves. As with many groups affected by Australia's policy of Assimilation, the Djurid Balud were displaced from the area following European settlement in the mid-1840s, leading to the breaking up of the clan. The loss of the resources that the mountain provided, the ravages of European disease, and armed clashes with the settlers were all contributing factors. By the early 1870s, the last of the Djurid Balud had been relocated to mission stations. Some of their descendants still live in the area and there are also a number of archaeological sites nearby. Indeed, a survey of Mount Arapiles in 1992 located no fewer than 42 Aboriginal archaeological sites, including "quarries" for hard stone for implements, scarred trees and rock art sites.

The European colonisation of Australia also brought with it many explorers to chart the continent. The first recorded ascent of Arapiles was on 23 July 1836, by the European explorer, Major Thomas Mitchell. He named the landmark after the Arapiles hills near Salamanca, Spain, where the Battle of Salamanca took place, in which Mitchell had seen action.

An extract from Mitchell's diary on 22 July reads: "This certainly was a remarkable portion of the earth's surface, and rather resembled that of the moon as seen through a telescope." There is a plaque commemorating his contributions to Arapiles on the aptly named "Plaque Rock", which is close to the current camp grounds.

== Geology ==
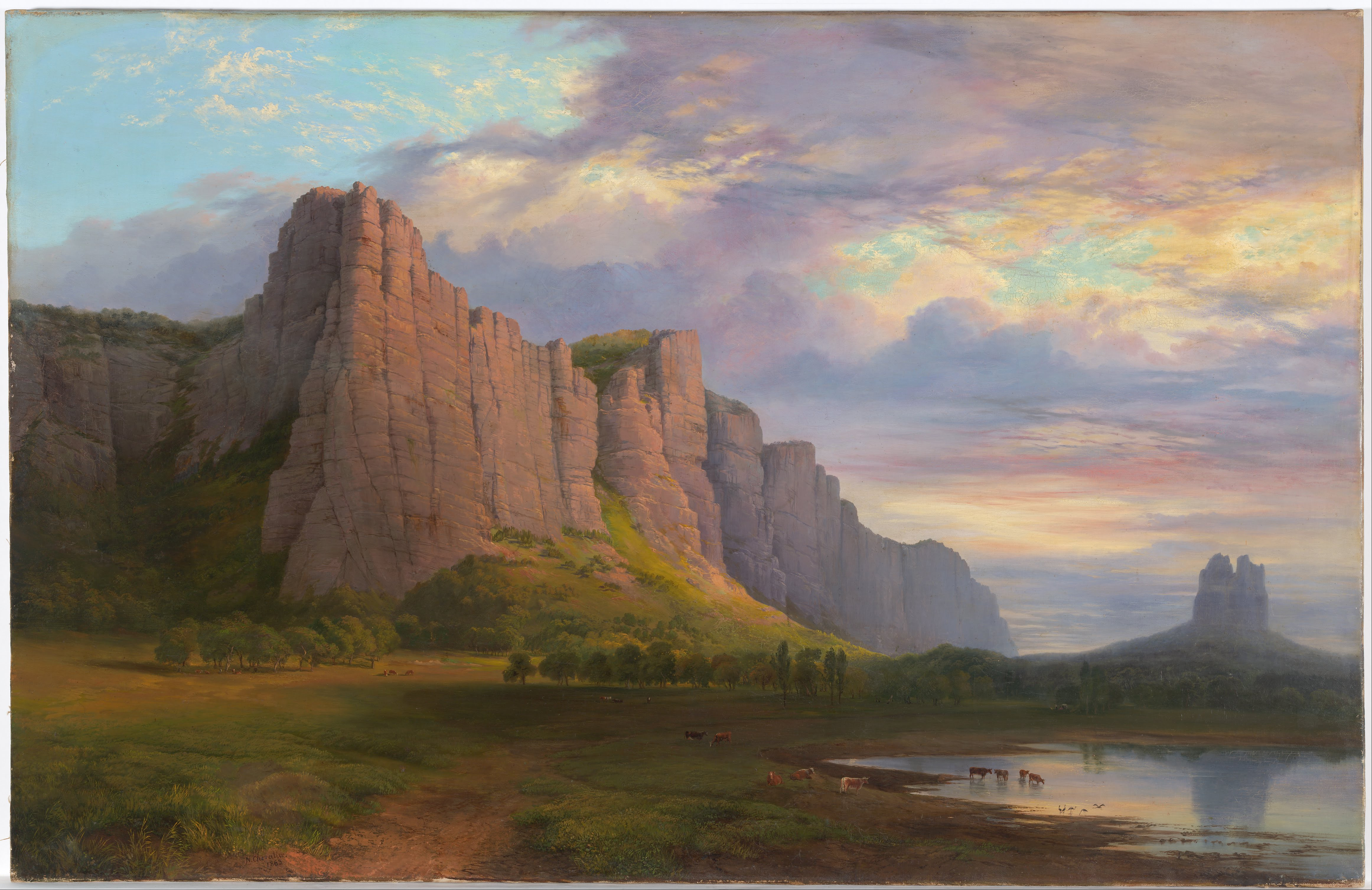
Mount Arapiles and the Mitre Rock (1863) by Nicholas Chevalier

Mount Arapiles is primarily composed of quartzite, a metamorphic rock that was originally quartzose conglomerate and sandstone (quartz arenite). That protolith was laid down in the earliest part of the Devonian period (approx 420 Ma), as part of a substantial fluvial system. Evidence for that deposition can be seen in the decimeter-meter scale cross stratification and lateral accretion surfaces visible in the cliffs, and the presence of many beds containing well rounded, pebble size clasts. The nearby Grampians/Gariwerd mountain range contains some more distal facies of the same depositional system, which is evidenced by the lesser quantity of conglomerate and smaller average grain size.

Arapiles is preserved due to a granitic intrusion that was emplaced below the sandstone and conglomerate approx 400 Ma, or 20 million years after sedimentation. That intrusion advected heat from lower in the crust, facilitating pervasive quartz cementation of the detrital grains. The granite also contained some highly siliceous fluids that were driven off as the rock cooled. Those fluids probably also contributed to the cementation of the sediments. The process of direct heating due to magma transport is known as contact metamorphism.

Although the unmetamorphosed, but otherwise similar, sediments surrounding "the Mount" have eroded away, Arapiles has been preserved, because the total occulsion of pore space related to the cementation helps to limit erosion.

The rock has a distinct red/orange tinge that is due to trace amounts of iron oxide and various other impurities.

== Climbing ==
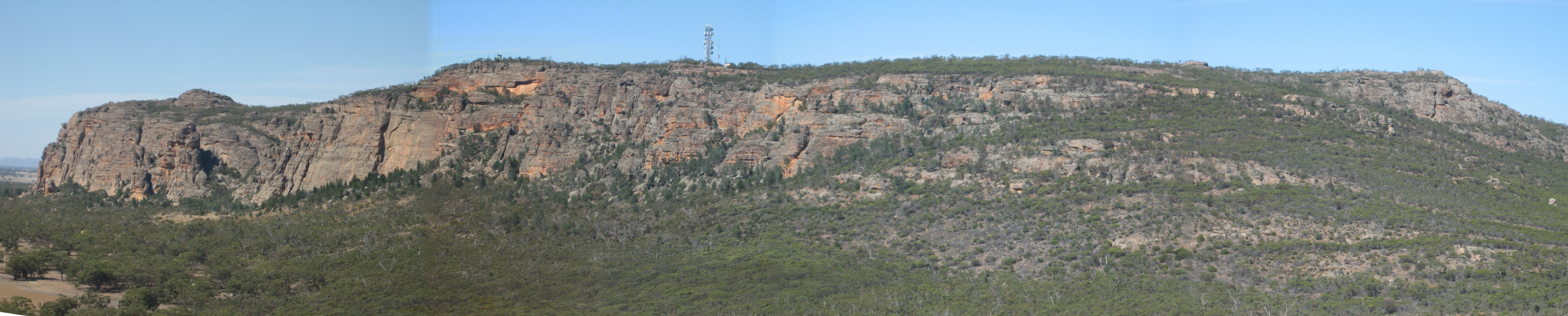
Mount Arapiles as seen from Mitre Rock. The main climbing areas are located on the left of this photo; the Pharos and the Watchtower faces are visible, while others are out of sight around the left corner.

Although there are many hiking routes to the top (including one resembling a via ferrata), most ascentionists choose to free climb one of the thousands of vertical routes on the mountain. Since the advent of modern rock climbing, thousands of routes have been recorded.

=== History ===
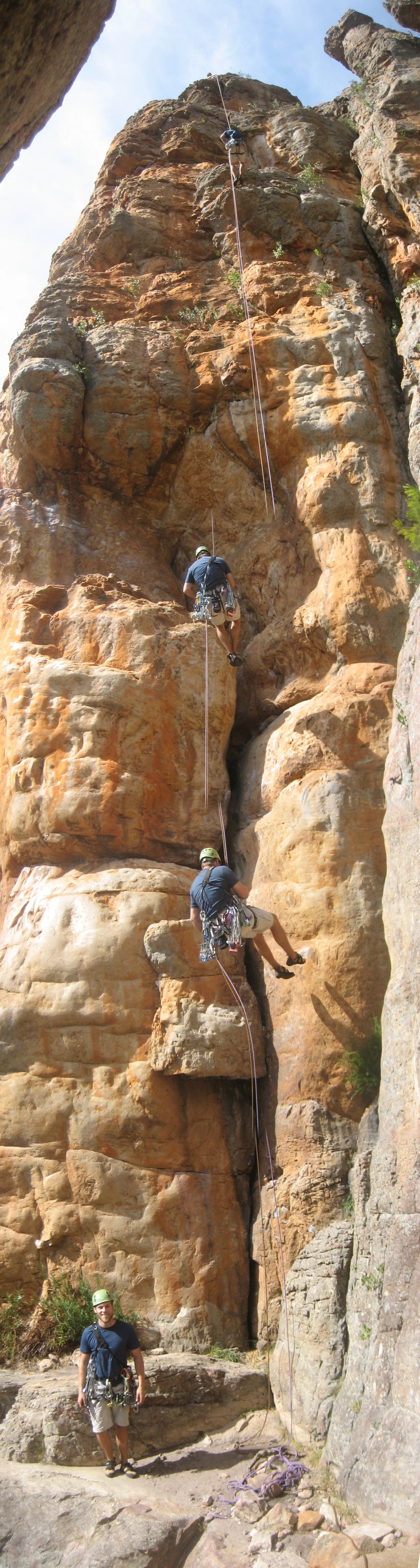
Abseiling at the back of Muldoon, 13. The start of the climb is the large vertical crack visible to the right of the climber at the bottom.

Note: the modern history of Mount Arapiles is covered in greater detail in many of the works listed in the References section.

Arapiles was first considered for climbing in a recreational manner in September 1963, when Bob and Steve Craddock travelled to Mitre Rock after seeing it in a tourist guide, and saw that their destination was dwarfed by Mount Arapiles. It was a number of weeks and visits before climbing was actually attempted at Arapiles, with the first climbs being recorded in November 1963 on what is now called "The Pinnacle Face". The pioneering group, consisting of the Craddocks, Doug Angus, Peter Jackson, and Greg Lovejoy split into two parties, with each party claiming a route on the same day. Many more climbs were put up in the following days and weeks, including the classic climb Tiptoe Ridge (5), and in 1964 Steve Craddock and his father Bob produced the first Arapiles climbing guidebook on a school duplicating machine (featuring 15 routes).

March 1965 saw the establishment of two significant climbs: 'The Bard' (12) and 'Watchtower Crack' (16). These climbs were done on the same day and are still regarded as classic climbs, often seeing numerous ascents per day. Activity steadily increased at Arapiles and in August 1966, Mike Stone and Ian Speedie released the second guidebook, Mt Arapiles. It was the first hardcover guide in Australia and featured 108 climbs. The rest of the 1960s saw many more new routes put up of increasing difficulty, with many including numerous aid points. The focus was on "getting up the climb... and staying alive", whether free climbing or not.

The early 70s saw a lull in activity at Arapiles as attention shifted to the Grampians and Mount Buffalo. Interest in Arapiles resurfaced in late 1973 with many imposing lines being climbed with a few aids. These routes brought a sense of accomplishment to the climbing community as new grades were continually being created. In 1975, American visitor "Hot" Henry Barber arrived and began freeing these routes with minimal protection. The 21-year-old made a significant impact at Arapiles, and his visit was a pivotal point in Australian climbing, as climbers worked to support the legacy of Barber by freeing their new lines instead of being content to leave in aid points.

Word of Barber's achievements spread and attracted a number of new young climbers to Arapiles. This group was later given the name "The New Wave" and throughout the rest of the 70s and early 80s they were responsible for scores of routes in the grade 20–25 range. The likes of Kim Carrigan, Mike Law and Mark Moorhead helped introduce a number of 26+ climbs, though the latter two did not often grade their climbs accurately (choosing to 'undergrade' them instead). This purposeful undergrading is known as "sandbagging" and is still common in Australian climbing (some would call it tradition), though not as much as it once was.

German climber Wolfgang Güllich's ascent of 'Punks in the Gym' in April 1985 was major achievement. The route blasts up the middle of a blank, attractive orange wall and gave Arapiles (and Australia) international exposure. At the time it was graded 32 and was the hardest climb in the world, setting a new benchmark for difficulty. Following Güllich's climb, a number of routes of similar difficulty have been put up. It has a single chipped hold known as the 'birdbath hold' created by Martin Scheel before it was against ethics. In the early 1990s the hold crumbled, and a climber added glue to it, which remains to this day.

Arapiles is still a popular climbing destination, with some visitors staying for months at a time. The warm weather, accessibility, quantity and quality of climbs have helped to maintain the popularity of Arapiles with locals, Australians and international travellers alike.

=== Philosophy ===
Mount Arapiles is mainly regarded as a traditional climbing area – where climbers are expected to place their own protection, and remove it after climbing. The vast majority of climbs are therefore done using removable protection such as nuts, cams and RPs.

Arapiles also has a number of sport climbing routes, with most starting around grade 23, on the smaller holds in spots where the rock lacks features for traditional protection. Popular bolted routes can be found at the following areas: Dec Crag, Flight Wall and surrounds, Skyline Walls, The Bluffs, Strolling Wall, Castle Crag, The Pharos, Yesterday Gully, Doggers Gully, Poosticks Wall.

Many routes at Arapiles have lower-offs, so they can be approached from above or via an easier route. Although traditionally, before the '80s, preplaced gear was frowned upon, it is now more common. There are many routes with a mixture of fixed and natural gear for which this approach is suitable.

As in almost all climbing areas, chipping the rock to 'improve' holds is regarded as vandalism and is not tolerated. Historical exceptions to this stance include routes such as: Steps Ahead, London Calling, 'Sean's route in The Bluffs', Ethiopia, Punks in the Gym, Lord of the Rings, Wackford direct, Pet Abuse, Slopin' Sleazin' and Cecil B de Mille, many of which were the hardest climbs done in Australia at the time.

=== Climbing areas ===
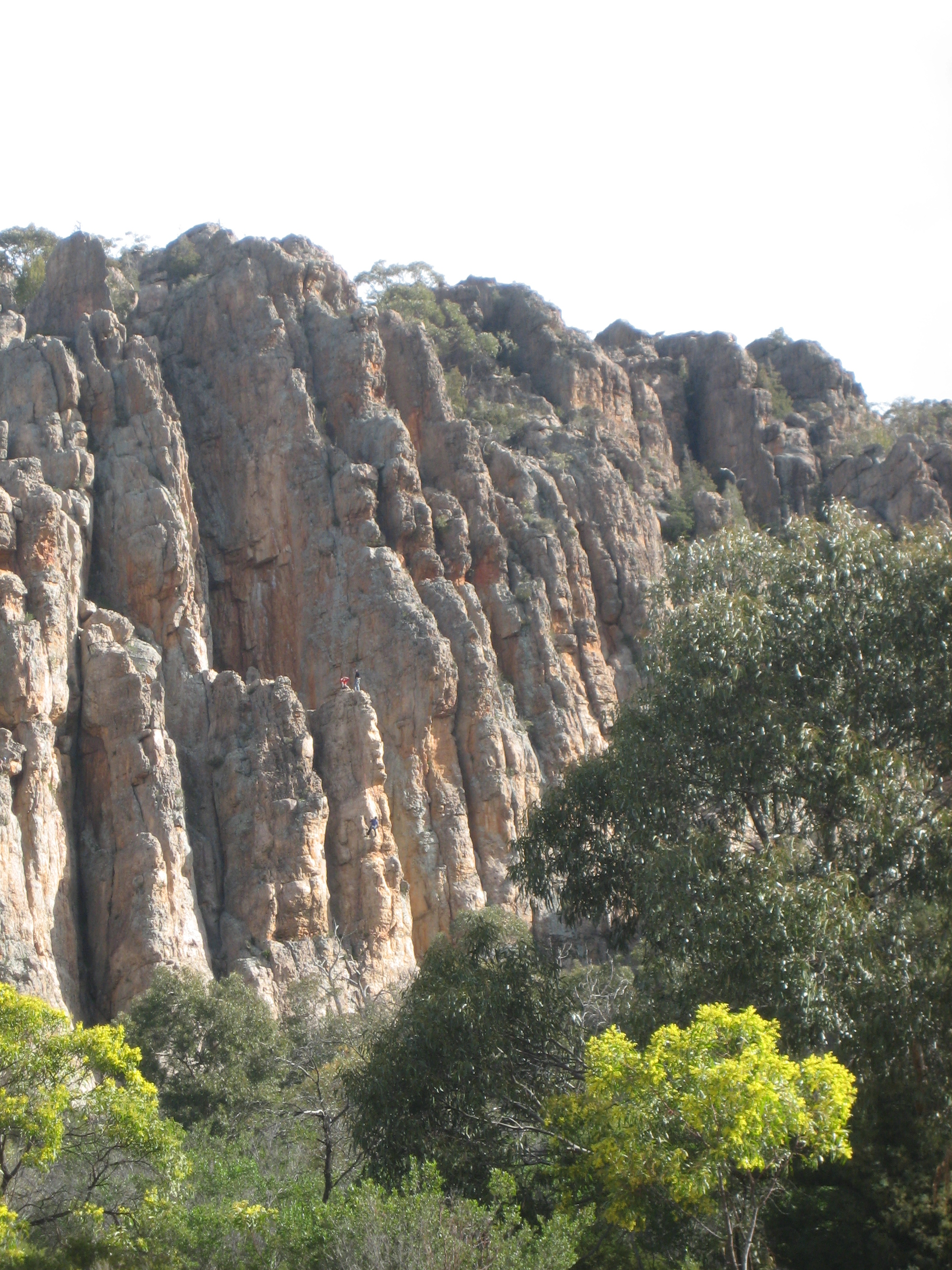
The Organ Pipes, with climbers visible for scale

The following is a list of the more notable climbing areas at Arapiles, including examples of famous climbs.

- Declaration Crag and Bushranger Bluff

Popular with beginners and school groups, due to the number of easier climbs and secluded location.

- The Atridae

Home of the "Flight Deck", a collection of more difficult climbs viewable from The Pines.

- The Organ Pipes

Popular with beginners, school groups and regulars; due to the plentiful classics and its proximity to the campgrounds.

- Bard Buttress and Tiger Wall

Bard Buttress is a large pillar adjacent to Tiger Wall, the most dominating feature of Arapiles to the passing observer. It features many multi-pitch classics and the longest climbs at Arapiles.

- The Bluffs

These two great blocks rest atop Tiger Wall and offer many classic lines that end in a satisfying peak bagging experience.

- Castle Crag

A small free standing rock opposite Tiger Wall; Castle Crag is a heavily concentrated area of climbing in the grade 20–26 range.

- The Pharos

Named after the Lighthouse of Alexandria, it is a large pillar of rock isolated from the main mountain. It features Punks Wall; home of 'Punks in the Gym' (32), which at one time was considered the most difficult climb in the world; and the Back Wall, which has a small collection of difficult classics.

- The Pinnacle Face

Home of the first recorded climbs at Arapiles, and also to 'Tiptoe Ridge' (5), a classic multi-pitch adventure.

- The Watchtower Faces

The left and right faces are water-streaked slabs that straddle the Watchtower itself, which is a rough buttress that has separated from the mountain proper. 'Watchtower Crack' (16) is an imposing line that follows the crack between the Watchtower and the Right Face.

- The Northern Group

There a number of notable cliffs are in this area, including Henry Bolte Wall, a sport climbing area; and Kachoong Cliffs, which features 'Kachoong' (21), a famous overhanging roof that is made all the more popular for being one of Australia's most photogenic.

- Mitre Rock

An isolated outcrop to the north of Arapiles, it has many excellent easier routes and is a popular day trip area especially on busy weekends.

=== Arapiles climbing guide update ===
Development of new routes continues today, albeit at a slow pace. An Arapiles climbing guide update was started in March 2009, which records all new or changed routes at Arapiles since the publication of the 2008 guidebook. In 2011 the guidebook was released in both smartphone and tablet format.

=== Bouldering ===
There are a number of bouldering areas spread around Arapiles that cater for all abilities. Two areas that are close to camp are the Krondorf Area and the Golden Streak Area. They are often populated in the late afternoon and early evening after the day's climbing has been done.

== Camping ==
Centenary Park is a camp ground on the East side of the mount. Access is from Centenary Park Road. A fee is payable. There are no powered sites, and campfires are only permitted between May and October. There is a toilet block with flush toilets.

== See also ==
- List of mountains in Australia § Victoria
