= List of British films of 1951 =

British films released in 1951

A list of films produced in the United Kingdom in 1951 (see 1951 in film):

== A–K ==
Title	Director	Cast	Genre	Notes
The Adventurers	David MacDonald	Jack Hawkins, Peter Hammond, Dennis Price	Adventure	
The African Queen	John Huston	Humphrey Bogart, Katharine Hepburn, Robert Morley	Adventure	
Another Man's Poison	Irving Rapper	Bette Davis, Gary Merrill, Anthony Steel	Crime drama	
Appointment with Venus	Ralph Thomas	David Niven, Glynis Johns, George Coulouris	War comedy	
Assassin for Hire	Michael McCarthy	Sydney Tafler, Ronald Howard, Katherine Blake	Crime	
Black Widow	Vernon Sewell	Christine Norden, Robert Ayres, Jennifer Jayne	Thriller	
Blackmailed	Marc Allégret	Mai Zetterling, Dirk Bogarde, Fay Compton	Drama	
The Browning Version	Anthony Asquith	Michael Redgrave, Jean Kent, Nigel Patrick	Drama	
Calling Bulldog Drummond	Victor Saville	Walter Pidgeon, Margaret Leighton, David Tomlinson	Crime	
Captain Horatio Hornblower R.N.	Raoul Walsh	Gregory Peck, Virginia Mayo, Robert Beatty	Adventure	
A Case for PC 49	Francis Searle	Brian Reece, Joy Shelton, Christine Norden	Mystery	
Cheer the Brave	Kenneth Hume	Elsie Randolph, Geoffrey Keen, Jack McNaughton	Comedy	
Chelsea Story	Charles Saunders	Henry Mollison, Sydney Tafler, Ingeborg Wells	Crime	
Circle of Danger	Jacques Tourneur	Ray Milland, Patricia Roc, Marius Goring	Thriller	
Cloudburst	Francis Searle	Robert Preston, Harold Lang, Elizabeth Sellars	Drama	
Cry, the Beloved Country	Zoltan Korda	Canada Lee, Sidney Poitier, Joyce Carey	Drama	Entered into the 2nd Berlin International Film Festival
The Dark Light	Vernon Sewell	Albert Lieven, David Greene, Katherine Blake	Drama	
The Dark Man	Jeffrey Dell	Maxwell Reed, Natasha Parry, Edward Underdown	Thriller	
Death Is a Number	Robert Henryson	Terence Alexander, Lesley Osmond, Ingeborg Wells	Horror	
Encore	Pat Jackson, Harold French, Anthony Pelissier	Nigel Patrick, Glynis Johns, Kay Walsh	Drama	Anthology of stories by W. Somerset Maugham
Files from Scotland Yard	Anthony Squire	John Harvey, Moira Lister, Reginald Purdell	Crime	
Flesh and Blood	Anthony Kimmins	Richard Todd, Glynis Johns, Joan Greenwood	Drama	
Four Days	John Guillermin	Hugh McDermott, Kathleen Byron, Peter Reynolds	Drama	
The Franchise Affair	Lawrence Huntington	Michael Denison, Dulcie Gray, Marjorie Fielding	Thriller	
The Galloping Major	Henry Cornelius	Basil Radford, Jimmy Hanley, Janette Scott	Comedy	
Green Grow the Rushes	Derek N. Twist	Richard Burton, Honor Blackman, Roger Livesey	Comedy	
Happy Go Lovely	H. Bruce Humberstone	Vera Ellen, David Niven, Cesar Romero	Musical	
Hell Is Sold Out	Michael Anderson	Mai Zetterling, Herbert Lom, Richard Attenborough	Drama	
High Treason	Roy Boulting	Liam Redmond, André Morell, Patric Doonan	Crime	
Home to Danger	Terence Fisher	Guy Rolfe, Rona Anderson, Alan Wheatley	Crime	
The House in the Square	Roy Ward Baker	Tyrone Power, Ann Blyth, Michael Rennie	Drama, Romance	
Honeymoon Deferred	Mario Camerini	Sally Ann Howes, Griffith Jones, Kieron Moore	Comedy	Co-production with Italy
Hotel Sahara	Ken Annakin	Yvonne De Carlo, Peter Ustinov, David Tomlinson	Comedy	
I'll Get You for This	Joseph M. Newman	George Raft, Coleen Gray, Charles Goldner	Crime	

== L–Z ==
Title	Director	Cast	Genre	Notes
Lady Godiva Rides Again	Frank Launder	Pauline Stroud, Stanley Holloway, Diana Dors	Comedy	
The Lady with a Lamp	Herbert Wilcox	Anna Neagle, Michael Wilding, Felix Aylmer	Biopic	
The Late Edwina Black	Maurice Elvey	David Farrar, Geraldine Fitzgerald, Roland Culver	Drama	
Laughter in Paradise	Mario Zampi	Alastair Sim, George Cole, Guy Middleton	Comedy	
The Lavender Hill Mob	Charles Crichton	Alec Guinness, Stanley Holloway, Sid James	Comedy	Number 17 in the list of BFI Top 100 British films; Ealing Studios
Let's Go Crazy	Alan Cullimore	Spike Milligan, Peter Sellers, Wallas Eaton	Comedy	
Life in Her Hands	Philip Leacock	Kathleen Byron, Bernadette O'Farrell, Joan Maude	Drama	
The Long Dark Hall	Reginald Beck, Anthony Bushell	Rex Harrison, Lilli Palmer, Raymond Huntley	Crime	
Madame Louise	Maclean Rogers	Richard Hearne, Petula Clark, Garry Marsh	Comedy	
The Magic Box	John Boulting	Robert Donat, Margaret Johnston, Maria Schell	Biopic	
The Man in the White Suit	Alexander Mackendrick	Alec Guinness, Joan Greenwood, Cecil Parker	Comedy	Number 58 in the list of BFI Top 100 British films; Ealing Studios
Mr. Denning Drives North	Anthony Kimmins	John Mills, Phyllis Calvert, Herbert Lom	Mystery	
Mr Drake's Duck	Val Guest	Douglas Fairbanks Jr., Yolande Donlan, Wilfrid Hyde-White	Sci-fi comedy	
Murder in the Cathedral	George Hoellering	John Groser, Alexander Gauge, George Woodbridge	Historical	
Mystery Junction	Michael McCarthy	Sydney Tafler, Barbara Murray, Patricia Owens	Crime	
Never Take No for an Answer	Maurice Cloche, Ralph Smart	Denis O'Dea, Nerio Bernardi, Clelia Matania	Drama	Co-production with Italy
Night Was Our Friend	Michael Anderson	Elizabeth Sellars, Michael Gough, Ronald Howard	Drama	
Night Without Stars	Anthony Pelissier	David Farrar, Nadia Gray, Maurice Teynac	Crime	
No Highway in the Sky	Henry Koster	James Stewart, Marlene Dietrich, Glynis Johns	Drama	
No Resting Place	Paul Rotha	Michael Gough, Noel Purcell, Eithne Dunne	Drama	
Old Mother Riley's Jungle Treasure	Maclean Rogers	Arthur Lucan, Kitty McShane, Garry Marsh	Comedy	
One Wild Oat	Charles Saunders	Robertson Hare, Stanley Holloway, Ingeborg Wells	Comedy	
Out of True	Philip Leacock	Jane Hylton, Muriel Pavlow, Mary Merrall	Drama	
Pandora and the Flying Dutchman	Albert Lewin	Ava Gardner, James Mason, Nigel Patrick	Drama	
Penny Points to Paradise	Tony Young	Harry Secombe, Alfred Marks, Peter Sellers	Comedy	
Pool of London	Basil Dearden	Bonar Colleano, Earl Cameron, Susan Shaw	Drama	
The Quiet Woman	John Gilling	Derek Bond, Jane Hylton, Dora Bryan	Crime	
The Rossiter Case	Francis Searle	Helen Shingler, Clement McCallin, Sheila Burrell	Mystery	
Scarlet Thread	Lewis Gilbert	Kathleen Byron, Laurence Harvey, Sydney Tafler	Crime	
Scrooge	Brian Desmond Hurst	Alastair Sim, Mervyn Johns, Hermione Baddeley	Literary drama	
The Six Men	Michael Law	Harold Warrender, Olga Edwardes, Avril Angers	Crime	
Smart Alec	John Guillermin	Peter Reynolds, Leslie Dwyer, Edward Lexy	Crime	
Take Me to Paris	Jack Raymond	Albert Modley, Bruce Seton, Richard Molinas	Comedy	
A Tale of Five Cities	Various	Bonar Colleano, Barbara Kelly, Anne Vernon	Mystery	Co-production with Italy, West Germany, France, Austria and East Germany
The Tales of Hoffmann	Michael Powell, Emeric Pressburger	Robert Rounseville, Moira Shearer, Ludmilla Tchérina	Ballet	Two Academy Award nominations; entered at Cannes and Berlin
Talk of a Million	John Paddy Carstairs	Jack Warner, Barbara Mullen, Ronan O'Casey	Comedy	
There Is Another Sun	Lewis Gilbert	Maxwell Reed, Laurence Harvey, Susan Shaw	Drama	
The Third Visitor	Maurice Elvey	Sonia Dresdel, Guy Middleton, Hubert Gregg	Crime	
To Have and to Hold	Godfrey Grayson	Avis Scott, Patrick Barr, Ellen Pollock	Drama	
Tom Brown's Schooldays	Gordon Parry	Robert Newton, John Howard Davies, James Hayter	Drama	
Two on the Tiles	John Guillermin	Herbert Lom, Hugh McDermott, Brenda Bruce,	Comedy	
Valley of Eagles	Terence Young	Jack Warner, Nadia Gray, John McCallum	Thriller	
Where No Vultures Fly	Harry Watt	Anthony Steel, Dinah Sheridan, Meredith Edwards	Adventure	
Wherever She Goes	Michael Gordon	Eileen Joyce, Suzanne Parrett	Drama musical	Co-production with Australia
White Corridors	Pat Jackson	Googie Withers, James Donald, Godfrey Tearle	Drama	
The Wonder Kid	Karl Hartl	Bobby Henrey, Elwyn Brook-Jones, Oskar Werner	Comedy Drama	Co-production with Austria
Worm's Eye View	Jack Raymond	Ronald Shiner, Diana Dors, Garry Marsh	Comedy	
Young Wives' Tale	Henry Cass	Joan Greenwood, Nigel Patrick, Audrey Hepburn	Comedy	

== See also ==
- 1951 in British music
- 1951 in British television
- 1951 in the United Kingdom
