= 1951 in the United Kingdom =

In 1951 the Festival of Britain was held in the United Kingdom, and a general election returned Winston Churchill to power.

== Incumbents ==
- Monarch – George VI
- Prime Minister – Clement Attlee (Labour) (until 26 October), Winston Churchill (Conservative) (starting 26 October)

== Events ==
- January
  - British Board of Film Censors introduces X rating for films "Suitable for those aged 16 and over".
  - The Ford Consul introduced.
- 1 January – The radio series The Archers begins on the BBC Light Programme. It will still be on the air 75 years later.
- 9 January – The government announces abandonment of the Tanganyika groundnut scheme, writing off £36,500,000.
- February – Ferranti deliver their first Mark 1 computer to the University of Manchester, the world's first commercially available general-purpose electronic computer.
- 15 February – Iron and Steel Corporation of Great Britain takes shareholdings of principal steelmakers into state ownership.
- 21 February – An English Electric Canberra (with Rolls-Royce Avon engines) becomes the first jet to make an unrefuelled Transatlantic flight, taking 4 hours 37 minutes from RAF Aldergrove in Northern Ireland to Gander in Newfoundland.
- 26 February – Film noir Pool of London is released, the first British film with a major role for a black actor, Bermuda-born Earl Cameron.
- 12 March (dated 17 March) – The character Dennis the Menace first appears in The Beano comic.
- 13 March – Pineapple Poll, a Gilbert and Sullivan-inspired comic ballet, created by choreographer John Cranko with arranger Sir Charles Mackerras, is premiered at Sadler's Wells Theatre by the Sadler's Wells Ballet.
- 11 April – The Stone of Scone is located at Arbroath Abbey, having been stolen from Westminster Abbey by Scottish nationalists on Christmas Day 1950.
- 17 April
  - The submarine HMS Affray sinks, killing all 75 crew members.
  - Seven unofficial dockers' leaders are acquitted of offences under a wartime regulation intended to prevent industrial disputes.
  - The Peak District is established as the first of the national parks of the United Kingdom. The Lake District is designated so in May, and designations of Snowdonia and Dartmoor come into effect on 20 November.
- 22–25 April – Korean War: Battle of the Imjin River: the 29th Infantry Brigade of the British Army serving with the United Nations put up brave but ultimately unsuccessful resistance to the Chinese advance, with 141 UN troops killed. The last stand of the 1st Battalion, The Gloucestershire Regiment (the "Glorious Glosters") at Hill 235 rapidly becomes part of modern military tradition.
- 23 April – Aneurin Bevan, recently appointed as Minister of Labour and National Service, together with John Freeman and Harold Wilson, resign from the government in protest at Hugh Gaitskell's announcement in the Budget of 10 April to introduce prescription charges for dental care and spectacles (in order to meet the financial demands imposed by the Korean War).
- 28 April – Newcastle United win the FA Cup for the fourth time with a 2–0 win over Blackpool at Wembley Stadium. Jackie Milburn scores both goals in front of a crowd of 100,000 spectators.
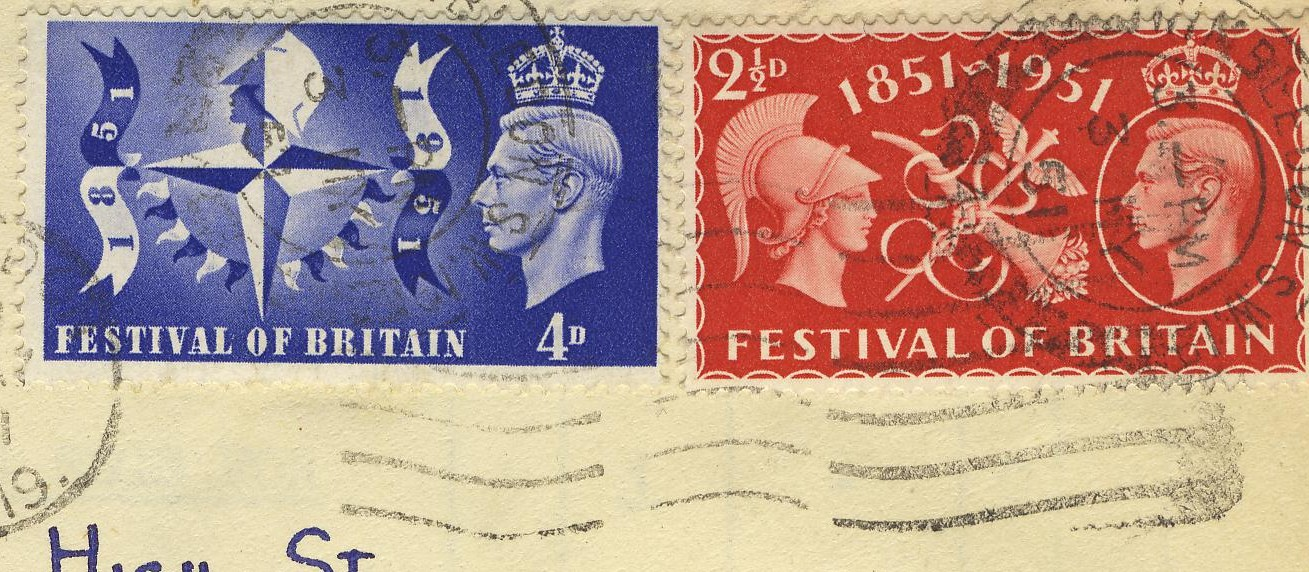
  Stamps marking the Festival of Britain, with Festival icon on the 4d issue
- 3 May – George VI opens the Festival of Britain in London, including the Royal Festival Hall, Dome of Discovery and Skylon. This would be the last major public event attended by the King and Queen together. Festival Gardens and a fun fair are opened in Battersea Park and the Lansbury Estate in Poplar is begun this year as a housing showcase.
- 4 May–6 October – Festival Ship Campania cruises the seaports.
- 14 May – The first volunteer-run passenger trains run on the Talyllyn Railway in Wales.
- 25–26 May – Spies Guy Burgess and Donald Maclean leave Britain to defect to the Soviet Union. This places suspicion on two other members of the 'Cambridge Five', Kim Philby and John Cairncross who are obliged to resign their official positions.
- 28 May
  - First broadcast of The Goon Show radio series.
  - Princess Elizabeth opens the Exhibition of Industrial Power, the latest part of the Festival of Britain, in Glasgow.
- 29 May – The Easington Colliery explosion leaves 83 people dead.
- 2 June – Workington F.C. are elected to the Football League in place of New Brighton A.F.C. and will compete in the Football League Third Division North for the 1951-52 season.
- 7 June – George VI is too ill to attend Trooping the Colour, so Princess Elizabeth leads the ceremony in his place.
- 26 June – Ealing comedy film The Lavender Hill Mob is released.
- 10 July – Boxer Randy Turpin beats the American Sugar Ray Robinson in a fight in London to become world middleweight champion.
- 17 July – New Port Talbot Steelworks opened at Margam, South Wales.
- 27 July – The first Miss World beauty pageant is held as a bikini contest as part of the Festival of Britain, at the Lyceum Ballroom, London; Kiki Håkansson of Sweden is the winner.
- 14 September – Clement Attlee opens the largest oil refinery in Europe at Fawley on Southampton Water.
- 22 September – The Colony of Singapore (modern-day Singapore) is granted city status through royal charter conferred by George VI.
- 23 September – George VI has an operation to remove part of his lung.
- 26 September – Rock and Ice Club formed by a group of climbers in Manchester.
- 30 September – Festival of Britain ends.
- October – Exercise Surprise Packet, the largest British peacetime military exercise.
- 5 October – With three weeks to go before the second general election in less than two years, opinion polls suggest that the Conservative Party led by previous wartime Prime Minister Winston Churchill, will oust Clement Attlee's Labour government from power after six years, with a majority of 75 to 100 seats and a share of the vote of up to 50%.
- 17 October – Austin A30 introduced.
- 26 October – The Conservative Party led by Winston Churchill wins the General Election, regaining (a month before his seventy-seventh birthday) the position of Prime Minister that he lost six years previously, with a majority of seventeen seats, though with slightly fewer votes than the Labour Party which wins the most votes of any party at any UK general election until 1992 and highest percentage vote share but will not return to government until 1964. The Liberal Party receives its lowest-ever share of the popular vote. Four Ulster Unionist candidates are returned unopposed in Northern Ireland, the last general election in which any candidate is so returned. This is also the last election in which the Conservatives achieve a stronger result in Scotland than in England.
- 31 October
  - Zebra crossings, a type of pedestrian crossing, is introduced for the first time.
  - Egypt unilaterally abrogates the Anglo-Egyptian treaty of 1936.
- 2 November – 6,000 British troops are sent to Egypt to deal with anti-British disturbances at Fayid in the Suez Canal Zone.
- 3 November – Express Dairies, owned by 28-year-old Patrick Galvani, open Britain's first full-size supermarket in Streatham Hill, London. Also this year, Fine Fare opens its first supermarket, in Welwyn Garden City.
- 7 November – UK bank rate, maintained at 2% since 26 October 1939, is raised.
- 20 November
  - More than 1,000 families of British servicemen begin to move out of the Suez Canal Zone of Egypt after a shooting, which claimed the lives of five British soldiers as well as nine Egyptian civilians.
  - The Prime Minister's Resignation Honours are announced, to mark the resignation of Prime Minister Clement Attlee.
- 24 November – Beinn Eighe in Scotland becomes Britain's first national nature reserve.
- 29 November – LEO becomes the world's first computer to run a full commercial business application, for the bakers J. Lyons and Co.
- 1 December – Benjamin Britten's opera Billy Budd is premiered at the Royal Opera House, Covent Garden.
- 10 December – John Cockcroft wins the Nobel Prize in Physics jointly with Ernest Walton "for their pioneer work on the transmutation of atomic nuclei by artificially accelerated atomic particles".
- 25 December – George VI makes his Christmas Speech to the Commonwealth for the final time, but it has been pre-recorded as he is still struggling to recover from his operation three months ago.
- 31 December – Prime Minister Winston Churchill sets off to the United States for talks with President Harry S. Truman.

=== Undated ===
- Trade union membership reaches an all-time peak, with 9,300,000 members.
- GCE Ordinary Level examinations introduced, together with Advanced Levels replacing the Higher School Certificate.
- First residential tower block in Britain, a 10-storey point block, The Lawn, in Harlow New Town in Essex, is constructed to the design of Sir Frederick Gibberd.
- Performance of medieval mystery plays revived at York and Chester.

== Publications ==
- Agatha Christie's adventure novel They Came to Baghdad.
- Graham Greene's novel The End of the Affair.
- Jacquetta Hawkes' landscape study A Land.
- C. S. Lewis' children's fantasy novel Prince Caspian, second published in The Chronicles of Narnia.
- Nicholas Monsarrat's wartime novel The Cruel Sea.
- Iona and Peter Opie's reference work The Oxford Dictionary of Nursery Rhymes.
- Nikolaus Pevsner's guidebooks Cornwall, Nottinghamshire and Middlesex, first in the Buildings of England series.
- Anthony Powell's novel A Question of Upbringing, first in the 12-volume cycle A Dance to the Music of Time.
- Ronald Ridout's First English Workbook, a textbook which sells five million copies.
- John Wyndham's post-apocalyptic novel The Day of the Triffids.
- First edition of The Good Food Guide edited by Raymond Postgate.

== Births ==
- 2 January – Piers Merchant, politician (died 2009)
- 5 January – Steve Arnold, footballer
- 7 January – Helen Worth, soap actress
- 9 January – Andy Qunta, singer-songwriter, composer and musician
- 15 January – Biff Byford, rock singer (Saxon)
- 19 January
  - Graham James, bishop
  - Arthur Taxier, Scottish-American actor
- 20 January – Ian Hill, rock bassist (Judas Priest)
- 21 January – Rosemary Shrager, chef and TV personality
- 26 January
  - Roy Goodman, English boy treble, conductor and violinist
  - Anne Mills, English economist and academic
- 30 January – Phil Collins, musician and producer
- 1 February
  - Christina Dodwell, explorer
  - Andrew Smith, politician, Secretary of State for Work and Pensions
- 2 February – Ken Bruce, radio broadcaster
- 6 February – Kevin Whately, actor
- 12 February – Howard Davies, economist
- 14 February – Kevin Keegan, footballer and football manager (died 2026)
- 15 February – Jane Seymour, actress
- 20 February – Gordon Brown, Scottish-born Prime Minister of the United Kingdom
- 24 February – Derek Randall, cricketer
- 26 February – Steve Bell, cartoonist
- 27 February – Steve Harley, glam rock singer-songwriter (Cockney Rebel) (died 2024)
- 4 March
  - Kenny Dalglish, footballer and manager
  - Chris Rea, singer-songwriter and guitarist (died 2025)
- 1 April – Kay Davies, geneticist, anatomist and academic
- 13 April – Peter Davison, actor
- 14 April
  - Julian Lloyd Webber, cellist and composer
  - Greg Winter, biochemist, recipient of the Nobel Prize in Chemistry
- 16 April – David Nutt, psychiatrist and academic
- 20 April – Louise Jameson, actress
- 25 April – Ian McCartney, politician
- 11 May
  - Kay Mellor, television scriptwriter (died 2022)
  - Mike Slemen, English rugby player and educator (died 2020)
- 13 May
  - Selina Scott, journalist and television presenter
  - James Whale, radio presenter
- 15 May – David Almond, children's fiction writer
- 27 May – John Conteh, light heavyweight boxer
- 1 June – Lola Young, Baroness Young of Hornsey, actress and author
- 7 June – Ralph Palmer, 12th Baron Lucas, accountant and politician
- 8 June – Bonnie Tyler, singer (died 2026)
- 11 June – Matthew Engel, journalist and author
- 14 June – Paul Boateng, politician
- 15 June – John Redwood, politician
- 16 June – John Salthouse, actor
- 27 June – Gilson Lavis, swing drummer (died 2025)
- 28 June – Lalla Ward, actress
- 30 June – Steve Waller, rock guitarist (died 2000)
- 1 July – Joanna Korner, judge
- 9 July – John Frieda, hairdresser (died 2026)
- 17 July – Doug Allan, wildlife photographer and cameraman (died 2026)
- 24 July
  - Fiona Reid, English-born Canadian actress
  - Chris Smith, politician
- 28 July
  - Ray Kennedy, footballer (died 2021)
  - Barbara Stocking, civil servant and academic
- 29 July – Susan Blackmore, popular psychologist
- 2 August – Gerald Suster, revisionist historian and novelist (died 2001)
- 15 August – Dave Needham, boxer (died 2008)
- 17 August
  - Alan Minter, middleweight boxer (died 2020)
  - Jonathan Ruffer, investor and philanthropist
- 19 August – John Deacon, rock bassist (Queen)
- 21 August – Glenn Hughes, rock musician
- 23 August – Philip Wilkinson, cricketer
- 25 August – Rob Halford, rock singer (Judas Priest)
- 28 August – Colin White, military historian (died 2008)
- 1 September – David Bairstow, English cricketer (died 1998)
- 14 September – Duncan Haldane, English-born condensed-matter physicist, recipient of the Nobel Prize in Physics
- 15 September – Gavin Muir, actor (died 2002)
- 22 September – David Coverdale, hard rock singer-songwriter
- 26 September – Stuart Tosh, rock drummer and singer-songwriter
- 27 September
  - Paul Craig, professor of law
  - Steve Soper, racing driver
- 30 September – John Lloyd, comedy producer
- 2 October – Sting, rock musician
- 3 October – Clive Charles, footballer (died 2003)
- 17 October – Colin Beattie, Scottish politician
- 6 November – Nigel Havers, English actor
- 15 November – Alamgir Hashmi, poet
- 17 November – Jack Vettriano, Scottish painter (died 2025)
- 19 November – Lord Falconer of Thoroton, politician
- 23 November – David Rappaport, English actor (died 1990)
- 8 December – Bill Bryson, American-born British non-fiction author
- 10 December – Doug Allder, footballer
- 18 December - Robin Millar, record producer
- 20 December
  - Kate Atkinson, writer
  - Denise Deegan, author and playwright
  - Lynne Featherstone, blogger and politician
  - Christopher Le Brun, painter and sculptor
  - Peter May, novelist and television dramatist
  - Nuala O'Loan, Baroness O'Loan, lawyer
- 21 December – Nick Gilder, English-Canadian singer-songwriter
- 22 December – Gerald Grosvenor, 6th Duke of Westminster, landowner and aristocrat (died 2016)

== Deaths ==
- 2 January – Edith New, suffragette (born 1877)
- 25 February – Sir Percy Malcolm Stewart, industrialist (born 1872)
- 6 March – Ivor Novello, actor, musician and composer (born 1893)
- 6 April – Robert Broom, paleontologist (born 1866)
- 14 April – Ernest Bevin, labour leader, politician and statesman (born 1881)
- 22 April – Horace Donisthorpe, myrmecologist (born 1870)
- 24 April – Joseph Maclay, 1st Baron Maclay, Glasgow shipowner and Minister of Shipping, 1916–1921 (born 1857)
- 2 May – Tufton Beamish, British admiral and politician (born 1874)
- 11 June – W. C. Sellar, humourist (born 1898)
- 3 July – Gwendoline Davies, philanthropist (born 1882)
- 21 August – Constant Lambert, composer (born 1905)
- 27 September – Robert Thomas, politician (born 1873)
- 29 September – Evan Roberts, preacher (born 1878)
- 11 December – Christopher Addison, anatomist and politician (born 1869)

== See also ==
- 1951 in British music
- 1951 in British television
- List of British films of 1951
