= 1951 in British television =

This is a list of British television related events from 1951.

== Events ==
=== July ===
- 16 July – The game show What's My Line? debuts on the BBC Television Service. It will be one of the top-rated programmes for the rest of the decade and make a star of its host, Eamonn Andrews.

=== October ===
- 12 October – The Holme Moss transmitter is opened in Northern England, making the BBC Television Service available to the region for the first time.

=== November ===
- 9 November – Launch of TV Comic, the first – and one of the last surviving – British children's weekly anthology comic book based around television series.

=== Unknown ===
- The BBC broadcasts horse racing for the first time when it televises races from Ascot.

== Debuts ==
- 6 February – The Railway Children (1951)
- 20 May – The Black Arrow (1951)
- 17 June – Five Children and It (1951)
- 16 July – What's My Line? (1951–1963, 1973–1974, 1984–1990)
- 29 July – The Final Test (1951)
- 12 August – Albert (1951)
- 2 September – Treasure on Pelican (1951)
- 25 September – Puck of Pook's Hill (1951)
- 20 October
  - Sherlock Holmes (1951)
  - Stranger from Space (1951–1952)
- 6 November – Sara Crewe (1951)
- Unknown
  - The Charlie Chester Show (1951, 1955)
  - The Inch Man (1951–1952)

== Continuing television shows ==
=== 1920s ===
- BBC Wimbledon (1927–1939, 1946–2019, 2021–present)

=== 1930s ===
- Picture Page (1936–1939, 1946–1952)
- For the Children (1937–1939, 1946–1952)
- Trooping the Colour (1937–1939, 1946–2019, 2023–present)
- The Boat Race (1938–1939, 1946–2019, 2021–present)
- BBC Cricket (1939, 1946–1999, 2020–2024)

=== 1940s ===
- Kaleidoscope (1946–1953)
- Muffin the Mule (1946–1955, 2005–2006)
- Café Continental (1947–1953)
- Television Newsreel (1948–1954)
- The Ed Sullivan Show (1948–1971)
- Come Dancing (1949–1998)
- How Do You View? (1949–1953)

=== 1950s ===
- Andy Pandy (1950–1970, 2002–2005)

== Ending this year ==
- 23 January – Little Women (1950–1951)
- 24 November – Sherlock Holmes (1951)

== Births ==
- 7 January – Helen Worth, born Cathryn Helen Wigglesworth, actress
- 21 January – Rosemary Shrager, chef and presenter
- 6 February – Kevin Whately, actor
- 15 February – Jane Seymour, born Joyce Frankenberg, actress
- 18 March – Paul Barber, actor
- 13 April – Peter Davison, actor
- 20 April – Louise Jameson, actress
- 11 May – Kay Mellor, born Kay Daniel, scriptwriter and actress (died 2022)
- 13 May – Selina Scott, journalist, newsreader and television presenter
- 23 May – Don Warrington, actor
- 4 June – David Yip, actor
- 28 June – Lalla Ward, actress
- 17 July – Doug Allan, Scottish wildlife cameraman (died 2026)
- 4 September – David Renwick, scriptwriter
- 10 September – Sally Grace, satirist, actress and voice actress (died 2026)
- 30 September – John Lloyd, producer
- 6 November – Nigel Havers, actor
- 15 November – Billy McColl, actor (died 2014)
- 24 November – Margaret Mountford, lawyer, businesswoman and television personality
- 20 December – Peter May, novelist and television dramatist

== See also ==
- 1951 in British music
- 1951 in British radio
- 1951 in the United Kingdom
- List of British films of 1951
