= Edward Downes =

British conductor (1924-2009)

Sir Edward Downes CBE
- Edward Downes in the recording studio, 1971.
- Born: Edward Thomas Downes; 17 June 1924; Birmingham, England
- Died: 10 July 2009 (aged 85); Zürich, Switzerland
- Other name: Ted Downes
- Education: University of Birmingham; Royal College of Music
- Known for: Conducting
- Spouse: Joan Weston (m. 1955)
- Children: 2

Sir Edward Thomas Downes, CBE (17 June 1924 – 10 July 2009), known as Ted Downes, was an English conductor, specialising in opera.

He was associated with the Royal Opera House from 1952, and with Opera Australia from 1970. He was also well known for his long working relationship with the BBC Philharmonic and for working with the Netherlands Radio Orchestra. Within the field of opera, he was particularly known as a conductor of Verdi.

He and his wife, Joan, Lady Downes, committed assisted suicide at the Dignitas clinic in Switzerland on 10 July 2009, an event that received significant media coverage.

== Early life and education ==
Downes was born in Birmingham, England in 1924, the son of a bank teller. He began to learn the piano and violin at age five and was also a choirboy at King Edward's School, learning the organ and becoming choir master when his voice broke at 13. He left school at the age of 14 to earn his living in a low-paid position at the City of Birmingham Gas Department.

Having spent his lunch hours studying by himself in Birmingham Central Library, he won a scholarship at the age of 16 to the University of Birmingham. Because his parents believed that a musical career was immoral, they made him leave home and he spent his university time as a fire watcher, living in the fire station, while he studied English literature and music. He began playing the horn. A scholarship to the Royal College of Music to study composition (with Ralph Vaughan Williams and R. O. Morris) and horn (with Frank Probin) followed. Only weeks after starting the course, Probin sent Downes as his deputy on a tour with the London Symphony Orchestra, which continued over the years Downes spent at the college, but on leaving the Royal College he decided that orchestral playing would not be his career. He played in the orchestra at Sadler's Wells in the opening performances of Benjamin Britten's Peter Grimes in 1945, and at Covent Garden in ballet performances (The Sleeping Beauty) in 1946, while still at the Royal College of Music. He also played for the orchestra of the San Carlo Opera Company.

After some time on the staff at the University of Aberdeen, where he conducted his first opera, Mozart's The Marriage of Figaro, Downes' pursuit of conducting was aided by a two-year Carnegie scholarship which allowed him to study with Hermann Scherchen in Zurich.

In 1955, he married Joan Weston, a dancer with the Royal Ballet. She later became a choreographer and television producer. They had two children, a son, Caractacus (born 1967), a musician and recording engineer, and a daughter, Boudicca (born 1970), a video producer.

== Conducting career ==
After nearly two years with Scherchen, Downes returned to England and joined the Carl Rosa Opera Company as a répétiteur. After the company's temporary closure in 1951, Downes began a long and fruitful association with the Royal Opera House, Covent Garden in 1952 with his appointment as an assistant to Rafael Kubelík. He started work as repetiteur and prompter on the same day that Joan Sutherland began with the company, his first assignment being a new Günther Rennert production of Un ballo in maschera, shortly followed as prompter for Maria Callas in her house debut in Norma with Vittorio Gui conducting. His next job was singing the role of Tristan in stage rehearsals under Barbirolli, pending the arrival Ludwig Suthaus, then teaching the local singers in Elektra.

His first conducting assignment was taking over from John Barbirolli in La bohème in Bulawayo, while at Covent Garden, it was in 1954 for Der Freischütz. Downes's first experience of conducting a new production came about by accident when the eminent elderly French conductor Désiré-Émile Inghelbrecht proved unable to hold the ensemble together, so that after the general rehearsal David Webster and the French ambassador in London persuaded Inghelbrecht to withdraw, and Downes took over from the opening night.

Downes remained a company member for 17 years, returning annually thereafter as a guest conductor before assuming the post of Associate Music Director in 1991. Downes conducted at least 950 performances of 49 operas at Covent Garden, including Ring Cycles in 1967, 1968 and 1971.

Elsewhere, he became the Australian Opera's Music Director in 1970, conducting the first operatic performance in the Sydney Opera House in 1973, the Australian premiere of War and Peace by Sergei Prokofiev. He was Chief Conductor of the Netherlands Radio Orchestra until 1983. While Downes worked with many of the world's symphony orchestras, he enjoyed a particularly long relationship with the BBC Philharmonic (formerly the BBC Northern Symphony Orchestra), serving as its Chief Guest Conductor, then Principal Conductor.

== Repertoire ==
Downes was noted for his championing of British music, and especially for Prokofiev and Verdi. He advocated the symphonies of George Lloyd (also conducting a radio performance of John Socman) and premiered works by Alan Bush, Peter Maxwell Davies and Malcolm Arnold. His passion for Prokofiev was felt in performances of both major and lesser-known Prokofiev scores throughout the world. He also conducted the UK première of War and Peace at a concert performance at Leeds Town Hall in 1967. In 1979 he completed the orchestration of a one-act Prokofiev opera, Maddalena; he conducted its first recording in 1979 and its world premiere staging in 1981.

Downes' first experience of conducting the music of Verdi came when Rafael Kubelík withdrew from a Covent Garden Otello and Downes led the opera with no rehearsal. He felt on home ground, and then championed Verdi revivals in England. He conducted 25 of Verdi's 28 operas, and devised the idea to perform all of them in time for the 2001 centenary of the composer's death. With Paul Findlay, Downes planned a Verdi festival for the Royal Opera House which would cover all Verdi's operas from 1995 to 2001, performing four each year, starting each five-week festival with a large, grand work, then a revival of a repertoire piece then rarities. The plans included using variant arias and ballets. However, the full plans were not completed and Downes expressed regret that he had never conducted Alzira, Un giorno di regno or, especially, Les vêpres siciliennes. The conductor said: "I seemed to understand Verdi as a person. He was a peasant. He had one foot in heaven and one on the earth. And this is why he appeals to all classes of people, from those who know everything about music to those who are hearing it for the first time."

== Honours ==
Downes was appointed Commander of the Order of the British Empire (CBE) in the 1986 New Year Honours, and was knighted in the 1991 Queen's Birthday Honours.

== Death ==
Although not terminally ill, Downes had been coping with increasing deafness and near total blindness for many years. He had become almost totally dependent on his wife after his health declined following a hip replacement. Lady Downes was diagnosed with terminal pancreatic cancer that had metastasised to her liver, and given only weeks to live.

Lady Downes wrote a letter to family explaining that she had decided against treatment and that:

"It has been a happy and interesting life and I have no regrets. I have no idea how long I will last but I send love to you all and your extensive families.
Enjoy it while it lasts."

Sir Edward, aged 85, and Lady Downes, aged 74, ended their lives by assisted suicide at the Dignitas clinic in Zürich, Switzerland, on 10 July 2009. Although Joan did not want the children present, Dignitas encouraged it and "Ted and Joanie" were reported to be pleased when the time came. Their children issued a statement speaking of "serious health problems" suffered by the couple. A statement issued by the couple's children said that while Downes could have gone on living with his deafness and blindness, he did not want to do so after his wife was diagnosed with terminal cancer.

In March 2010, director of public prosecutions Keir Starmer stated that Caractacus Downes would not be prosecuted for his involvement with his parents' assisted suicide because it was not in the public interest.

Cultural offices
Preceded by Raymond Leppard	Principal Conductor, BBC Philharmonic; 1980–1991	Succeeded by Yan Pascal Tortelier
