= Mike Law (climber) =

Australian rockclimber

Mike Law (a.k.a. The Claw and Mikl; born 1958) is an Australian rockclimber known for establishing routes across Australia, especially in the Blue Mountains.

== Climbing ==
He became prominent in the New Wave Australian climbing scene when he made the first free ascent of Janicepts (21) in 1974, aged 15.

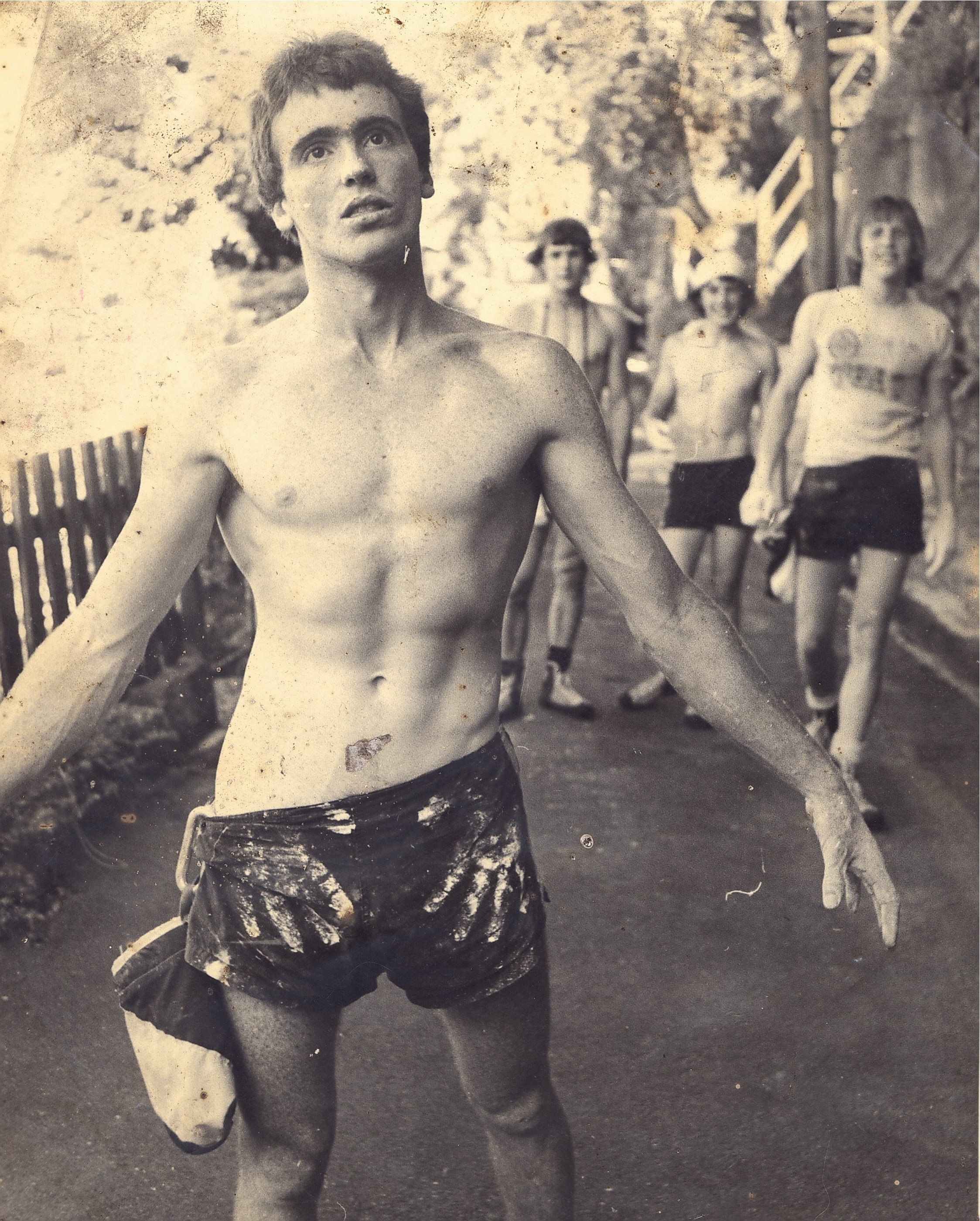
Bouldering at Hunters Hill 1976

Janicepts was first climbed by the great John Ewbank with a number of rests and, at grade 21, was regarded as the hardest route in Australia when first climbed in 1966. Law left the grade at 21 when Janicepts was freed.

He went on to establish hundreds of routes around New South Wales and Victoria, notably the Blue Mountains and Arapiles where he became known for 'sandbagging' and gave routes "The lowest grade [he] could without laughing".

He was one of the better climbers in Australia for 3 decades, but was more notable for many first ascents. His early routes were often undergraded and underprotected, his climbs this century are overgraded and overprotected. He also managed to model some of the best climbing fashion trends over the years.

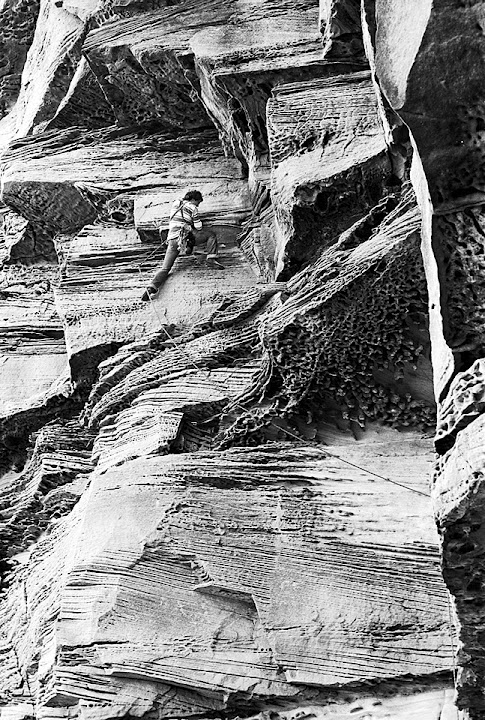
FA of Scrabble (19) at North head, 1981

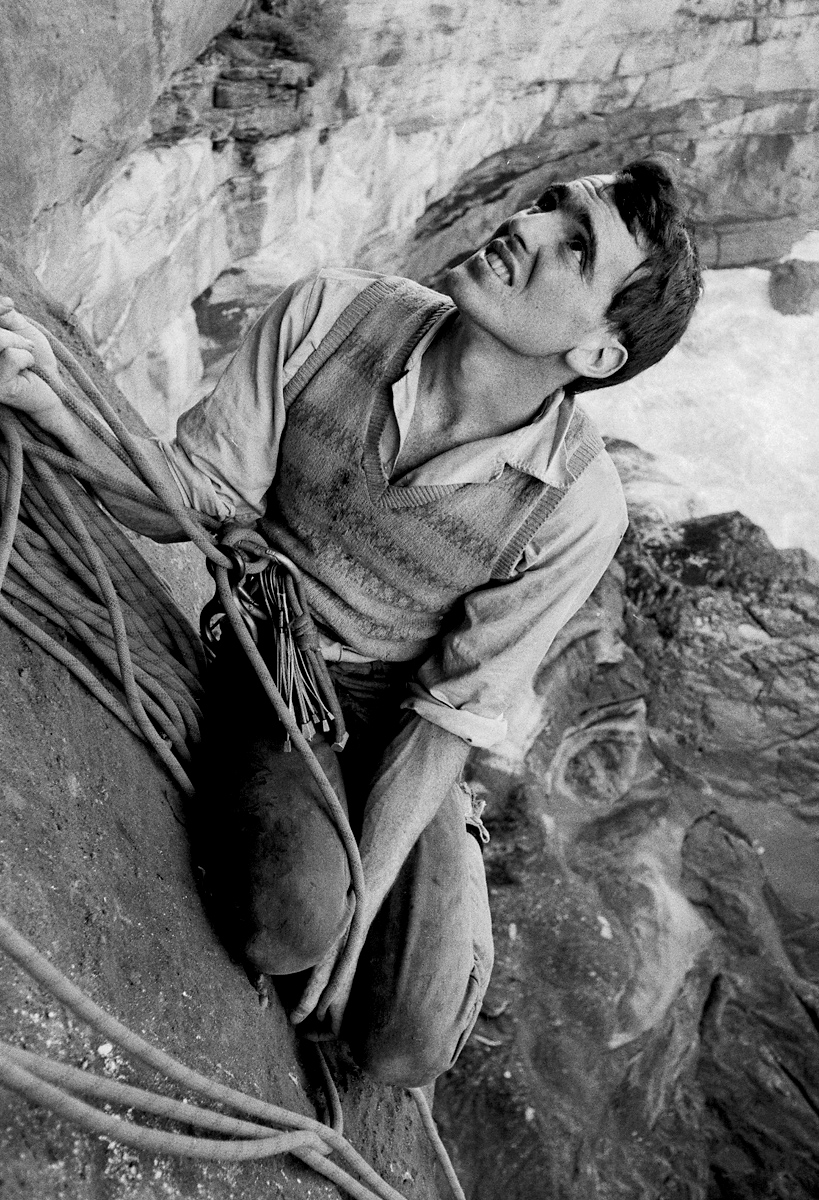
Belay mess below Lost In Space (21) The Gap, 1980

Mikl wrote many unofficial rock climbing guidebooks, first in paper form before the age of the internet and later online, including Rockclimbing at Mt Victoria (1978), Melbourne climbs (1981), Sydney and Sea-cliffs (1983 and many subsequent editions) and Blue Mountains Selected climbs (1988). He also contributed to a number of published climbing guidebooks, including many editions of Simon Carter's Blue Mountains Climbing.

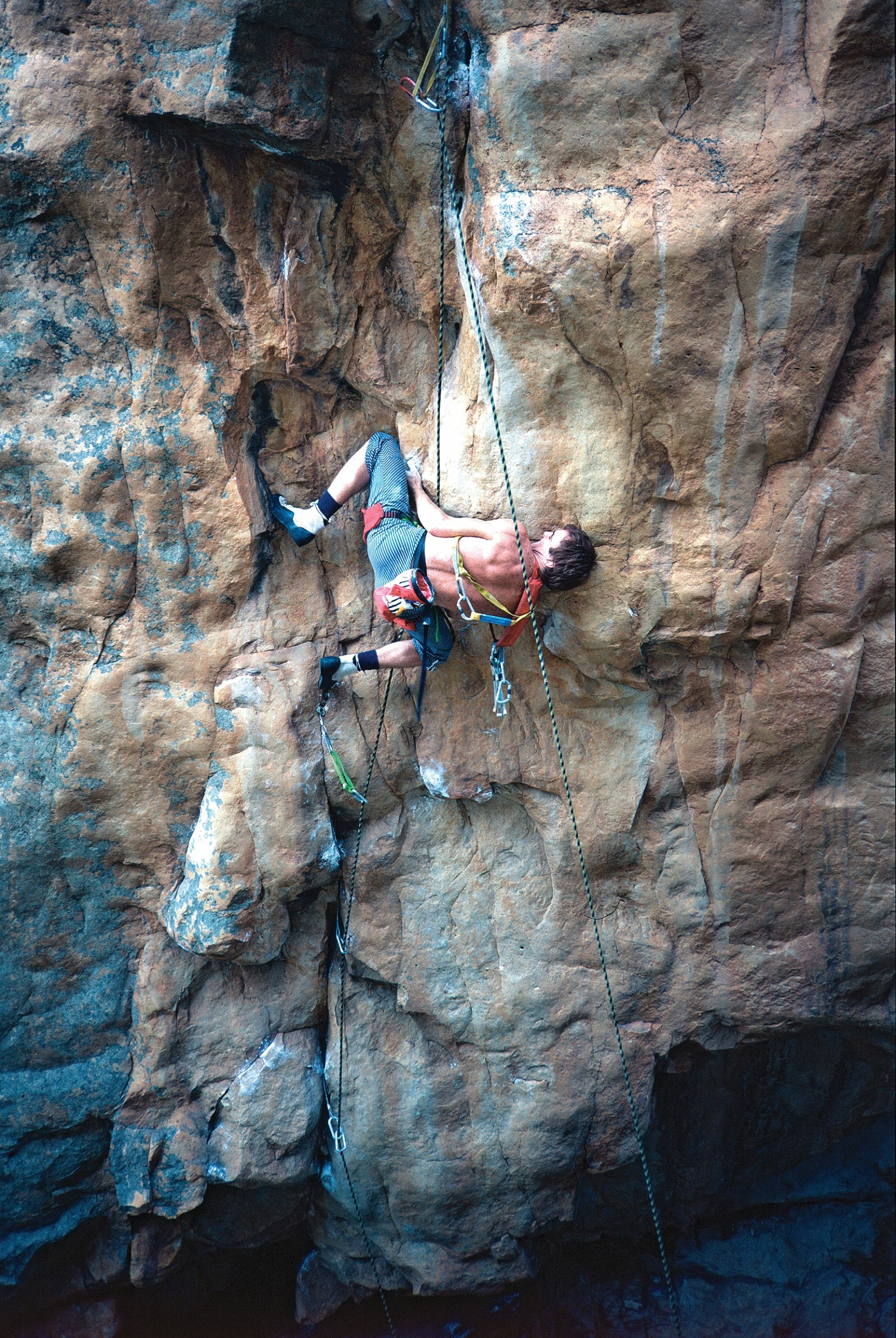
FA of Slopin' Sleazin' 1982, Arapiles, 1982

Mikl performed extensive testing of rock-climbing equipment and bolts in Australia's sandstone, resulting in the most established guide for soft rock bolting. In 2013 he published the autobiography Law Unto Himself with Open Spaces Publishing.

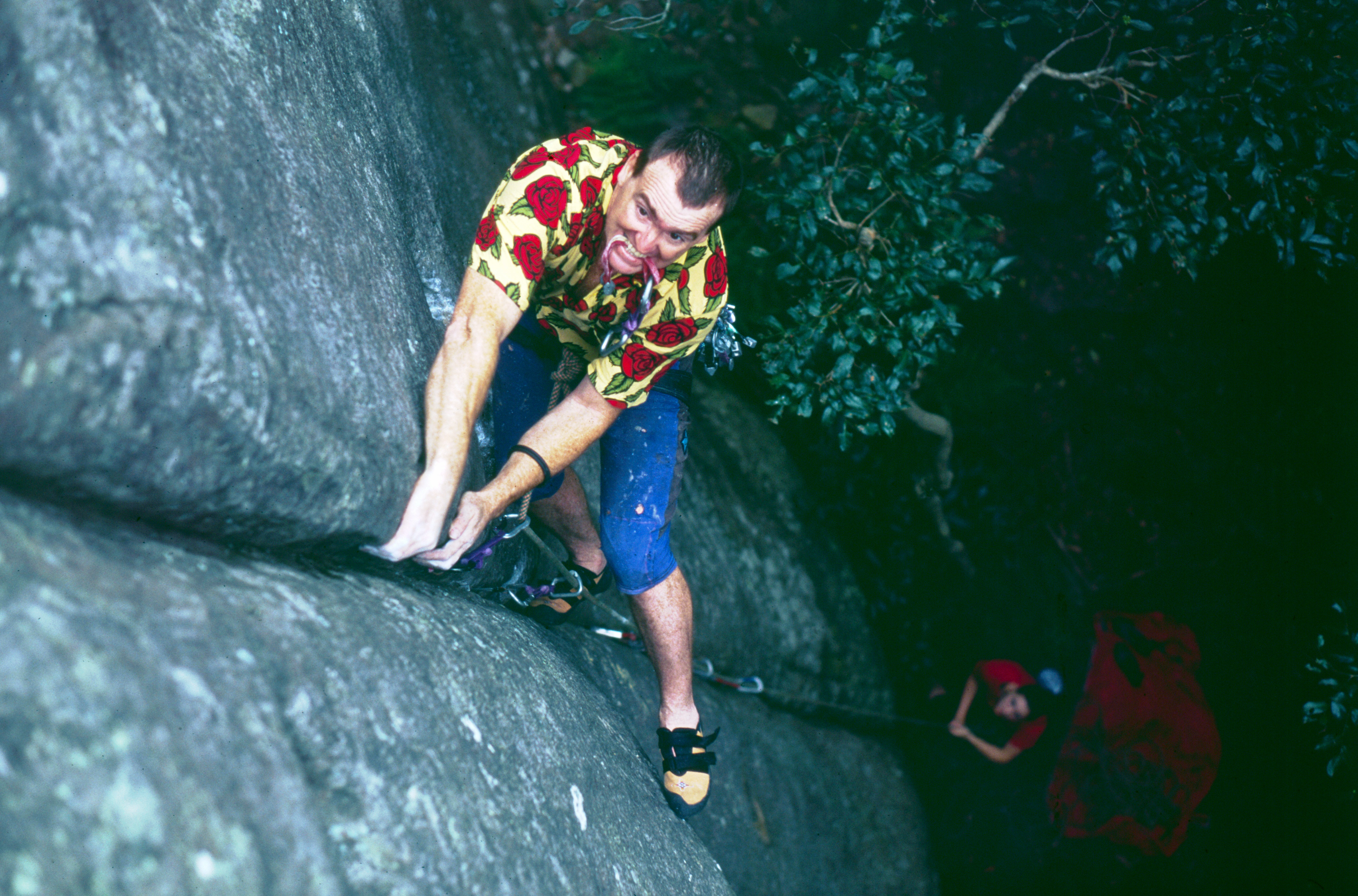
FA of Inchworm Groove (28), The Cathedral NSW

== Career ==
He went to university aged 34, got a PhD in Material Science. He worked at the Australian Nuclear Science and Technology Organisation until 2018, when he finally became a full time climber.

== Publications ==
- Law, Michael (2013). Law Unto Himself. Open Space Publishing. ISBN 978-0-9875264-1-0.
- Law, Mike; Hawkshaw, Steve (2011). Soft Rock Bolting Guide (PDF) (Report).

Many unofficial climbing guidebooks, some of which have later been translated into online websites.
