= John Socman =

John Socman is an opera in three acts by George Lloyd to a libretto by William Lloyd (the composer's father). It was first performed by the Carl Rosa Opera Company at the Bristol Hippodrome, England on 15 May 1951. The work was one of three operatic commissions to mark the Festival of Britain (the others being Ralph Vaughan Williams's The Pilgrim’s Progress and Benjamin Britten's Billy Budd).

Lloyd, who had suffered shellshock while serving in the Royal Marines during the Second World War, had a breakdown after writing John Socman, and abandoned composition for twenty years.

Annette Phillips, director of Carl Rosa commented that George Lloyd was chosen for the 1951 Festival commission given the talent he had shown in his two previous operas, but that for financial reasons John Socman could not remain in the repertory, despite an enthusiastic reception from audiences. The producer was Dennis Arundell, and a single performance followed in Northern Ireland.

The vocal score was published in 1951. A complete studio recording from Manchester was broadcast by BBC Radio 3 on 7 February 1982, conducted by Edward Downes.

== Roles ==
Role	Voice type	Premiere Cast, 15 May 1951 Conductor: Arthur Hammond
John Socman, a magistrate	baritone	Redvers Llewellyn
Sybil, in love with Richard	soprano	Ruth Packer
Warner, a Lollard scholar, Sybil's father	bass	
Richard, an archer, in love with Sybil	tenor	John Myrddin
Gower, Socman's servant	baritone	
Mawle, the sheriff's man	bass	
The Gleemaiden, a wandering singer	mezzo-soprano	Gita Denise
Brother Tom, a disreputable cleric	tenor	Tudor Davies
Sir Hugh Marnay	baritone	
The farmer	bass	
First farmer's son		
Second farmer's son		
Innkeeper		Eric Shephard
A tumbler	mute	

== Synopsis ==
The opera is set in Wiltshire, in the aftermath of the Battle of Agincourt, in 1415.

On return from France, Richard discovers that his sweetheart Sybil is being pursued by John Socman who hopes to force her to marry him in order to avoid having her father, a follower of John Wycliffe, executed as a heretic. Eventually Socman is revealed to have abandoned a wife years before.

== Recordings ==
- Lloyd: John Socman (Highlights) – Malcolm Rivers (baritone), Thomas Booth (tenor), Janice Watson (soprano), Michael George (bass), David Wilson-Johnson (bass), Diana Montague (soprano); Philharmonia Orchestra, London Voices; George Lloyd (conductor). Label: Albany Records 131.
