= Philip Wilkinson (cricketer) =

English cricketer (born 1951)

Philip Alan Wilkinson (born 23 August 1951 at Hucknall) is an English former first-class cricketer active 1971–77 who played for Nottinghamshire in 92 first-class and 90 List A matches.
