= George Lloyd (composer) =

British composer (1913–1998)

George Walter Selwyn Lloyd
- Born: 28 June 1913; St Ives, Cornwall, England
- Died: 3 July 1998 (aged 85)
- Education: Trinity College London
- Occupations: Musician, Composer
- Known for: John Socman opera
- Spouse: Nancy Juvet (m. 1937)
- Children: 0
- Father: William A. C. Lloyd
- Military career
- Allegiance: United Kingdom
- Branch: Royal Navy
- Service years: 1939-43
- Rank: Bandsman
- Unit: Royal Marines
- Conflicts: World War II * Arctic Convoys

George Walter Selwyn Lloyd (28 June 1913 – 3 July 1998) was a British composer.

== Biography ==
=== Early life ===
Born in St Ives, Cornwall, of part Welsh, part American ancestry, Lloyd grew up in a very musical family.

George's father, William A. C. Lloyd, was an accomplished amateur flautist and an Italian opera aficionado, writing a biography of Bellini. George Lloyd's mother played the violin, viola and piano. Both parents were leading members of the St Ives Arts Club and their house was a regular weekly venue for chamber music, so the young composer grew up with music all around him. His maternal grandmother was the American painter Frances (Fanny) Powell who had been an opera singer, and was an early pioneer of the St Ives artists' colony.

As a child George Lloyd suffered rheumatic fever and received most of his education at home. He showed an early attraction to music and began composing at the age of 9. He was trained in the dramatic aspects of opera by his father, who would regularly give him scenes from English plays to set to music. From the age of 14 George studied violin with Albert Sammons and composition with Frank Kitson and Harry Farjeon. He was a student at Trinity College London. His first symphony, written at the age of 19, was premiered in 1932 by the Penzance Orchestral Society and was performed again in 1933 by the Bournemouth Municipal Orchestra, with the composer conducting on both occasions. (Note: Lloyd's obituary in The Times mistakenly gave the Bournemouth performance as the premiere of the first symphony. The obituary is reproduced (uncorrected) on www.georgelloyd.com, and the error has been much copied around the web.) A second symphony had its premiere in 1935 and was soon followed by a third. George Lloyd and his father William, formed The New English Opera Company in 1935, with the intention of establishing a school of English opera. George Lloyd's first opera, Iernin, with a libretto by his father, was performed in 1934 in Penzance, before being transferred to the Lyceum Theatre, London, where it had an unusually long run. His second opera, The Serf, was staged by Vladimir Rosing at Covent Garden in 1938.

=== Royal Marines ===
Lloyd served in World War II with the Royal Marines as a Bandsman. On board the cruiser HMS Trinidad on Arctic convoys he was one of the Bandsmen manning the Transmitting Station, which was situated deep in the hull of the ship. In 1942, during an engagement, the ship fired a faulty torpedo which travelled in a circular track and hit the ship, fracturing a large fuel oil tank. Many of Lloyd's shipmates were drowned in the fuel oil, and he was the last man to escape from the compartment. He suffered severe mental and physical trauma from the shell shock, and was hospitalised before being discharged from the Royal Marines. After 4 years he was well enough to start composing again, through the devotion and love of his Swiss wife, Nancy.

=== Later life ===
When the war ended, his wife took him to Switzerland. In 1946 Lloyd resumed composition and wrote two symphonies and the opera John Socman, the last commissioned for the 1951 Festival of Britain. Lloyd's health deteriorated further, and in 1952, he took up full-time residence in Dorset. For 20 years, in addition to intermittent composition, he was a market gardener and grew mushrooms and carnations. He composed regularly from 4:30 a.m. to 7:30 a.m., before the start of the rest of his working day. During this period he continued to write in a tonal, melodic style, contrary to the prevailing climate of modernist and avant garde styles, so he met with difficulties in obtaining performances of his music. He recalled:

"I sent scores off to the BBC. They came back, usually without comment. I never wrote 12-tone music because I didn't like the theory. I studied the blessed thing in the early 1930s and thought it was a cock-eyed idea that produced horrible sounds. It made composers forget how to sing."

In 1972, he sold his market garden business and moved to London to "pick up the pieces of my musical life", as he put it, and began an extraordinary and productive Indian summer. A number of his scores were accepted for broadcast by the BBC, and he went on to collaborate with the BBC Philharmonic Orchestra, recording 7 of his 12 symphonies and 3 of his piano concertos with that orchestra. He was a very early adopter of digital technology and established his own recording, production, publishing and distribution company, making 22 CD recordings in all. After his death, he was Composer of the Week on Radio 3, and the 2013 BBC Proms programme included performances of his Requiem and his H.M.S. Trinidad March for Orchestra on the Last Night of The Proms.

The George Lloyd Society and the musical estate is administered by his nephew, William Lloyd, who worked with the composer as business manager, executive producer, and record distributor for the last 10 years of his life.

== Reception ==
Lloyd's first opera Iernin made his reputation in 1935, and he attracted the attention and approval of Rutland Boughton, Thomas Beecham, John Ireland, Ralph Vaughan Williams, and John Christie at Glyndebourne. He consolidated his reputation with The Serf at Covent Garden in 1938, which led to his operatic commission (John Socman) for the Festival of Britain after the war. Thereafter his reputation suffered because he was unwilling to change his style to accord with changes in the musical and critical environment. Nevertheless, Lloyd's champions included conductors Charles Groves and Edward Downes, and the virtuoso pianist John Ogdon who studied composition with Lloyd and for whom Lloyd wrote his first piano concerto (Scapegoat) and other works for solo piano.

Lloyd devoted more time to composition from 1973 onwards, and began to receive greater attention in subsequent years. The BBC broadcast his Symphony No. 8 in 1977, 8 years after its acceptance for broadcast in 1969. His Symphony No. 6 received a performance at The Proms in 1981. Lyrita Records Conifer Records and the American label Albany Records championed Lloyd's music through recordings. He developed a strong relationship with the BBC Philharmonic Orchestra, which recorded and broadcast seven of his symphonies. For Albany Records, Lloyd conducted his own music, with orchestras including the Albany Symphony Orchestra, the Philharmonia Orchestra, and the BBC Philharmonic. He was for two seasons Principal Conductor of the Albany Symphony Orchestra (New York State), where he conducted his own symphonies and works by 20th century American composers. He was guest conductor of the Hong Kong Philharmonic Orchestra, which premiered a number of his works. The US premiere of his Seventh Symphony was given by the Chicago Symphony Orchestra. He conducted 25 CD recordings in all, including two operas, in addition to those recorded by Sir Edward Downes and others. Only two orchestral works and his opera The Serf remained unrecorded at the time of his death.

Critical opinion of his work tended to polarise around those who appreciated his melodic and tonal, late romantic style, and those who found his work regressive. Many critics from both factions agreed on his mastery of orchestration and orchestral colour. His works for brass band found favour, being regularly adopted as test pieces in brass band contests throughout the UK and Europe.

In 2024 Lyrita agreed with the George Lloyd Society to take over the sale and hire of all the Society's scores and recordings. It released a box set of the first six symphonies as conducted by the composer in early 2024 both physically and digitally. With the second six released in April 2024.

== Personal life ==
George Lloyd's traumatic experience of the torpedo strike on HMS Trinidad had a profound effect on his mental, physical and emotional health. He spent several months in the Naval Hospital at Newmachar, near Aberdeen, suffering from shellshock (PTSD) which caused an uncontrollable shaking of the limbs, and which recurred for over 20 years. He acknowledged that he could not have recovered without the care and attention of his Swiss wife Nancy (née Juvet). His fragile health was the primary cause of his abandoning his full-time musical career in 1951. Lloyd had heart trouble toward the end of his life, but recovered sufficiently to complete his Requiem in January 1998, and completed the proofreading in early June, only three weeks before he died in London at the age of 85. Lloyd inscribed the score, his last composition, "Written in memory of Diana, Princess of Wales".

Lloyd and Nancy married in 1937. The marriage lasted until Lloyd's death. She survived him by 18 months, and the couple had no children.

== Music ==
Lloyd's works include 12 symphonies and four piano concertos, two violin concertos and a cello concerto. For his three operas, Lloyd's father wrote the libretti. Lloyd also wrote five works for brass band: Royal Parks, Diversions on a Bass Theme, English Heritage, Evening Song and Kings Messenger. He wrote the official ship's march for the Royal Marine Band on HMS Trinidad, and later arranged the work for orchestra and for brass band. He also wrote a work for wind band: Forest of Arden. His choral-orchestral works include Pervigilium Veneris (The Vigil of Venus), A Litany and A Symphonic Mass. His chamber-works include music for solo and duet piano, brass quintet, and works for violin and piano.

Lloyd's first opera, Iernin, was inspired by the Nine Maidens standing stones in the parish of St Columb Major, and tells the story of one of the Maidens who comes back to life as a fairy. The opera was first performed in 1934 at the Pavilion in Penzance, Cornwall. It was recorded in 1985 by the BBC Concert Orchestra, with the composer conducting and Marilyn Hill Smith singing the title role. To mark the centenary of Lloyd's birth, the opera was staged by Surrey Opera, in a new production directed by Alexander Hargreaves and conducted by Surrey Opera's artistic director Jonathan Butcher, in Croydon, Surrey, in October 2013, and on 1 and 2 November in Penzance.

In 2013, the British Library acquired all of George Lloyd's autograph music manuscripts, sketches and draft scores.

In 2018, the Ealing Symphony Orchestra announced that they would perform the complete cycle of George Lloyd's 12 symphonies under conductor John Gibbons.

In 2019 The George Lloyd Society published the first major survey of his work: The Swing of the Pendulum by Peter Davison.
