= Mount Arapiles-Tooan State Park =

- IUCN category II (national park)
- Location within Victoria
- Location: Victoria
- Nearest city: Horsham, Victoria
- Coordinates: 36°46′34″S 141°42′43″E
- Area: 74.75 km^{2} (28.86 sq mi)
- Established: 1987
- Governing body: Parks Victoria
- Website: Official website

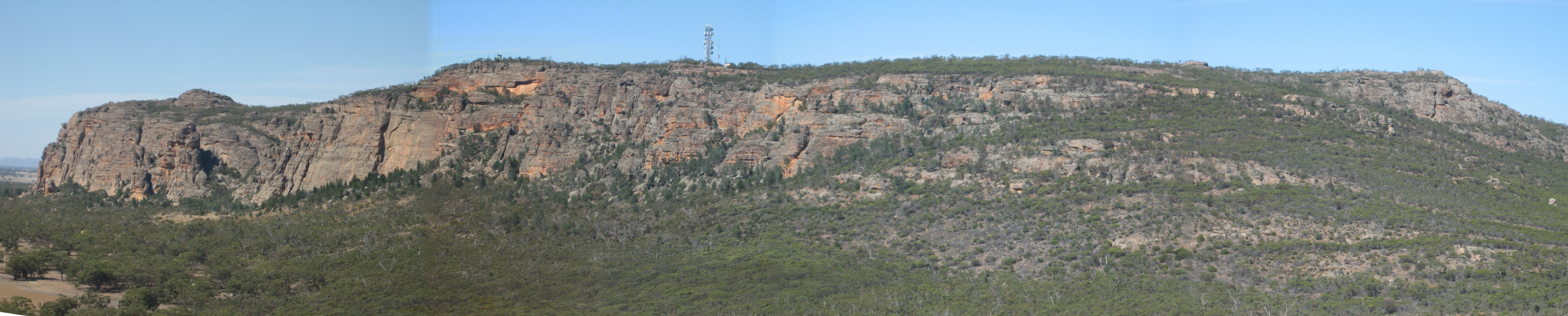
Mount Arapiles as seen from Mitre Rock.

The Mount Arapiles-Tooan State Park is a state park in the Wimmera plains of western Victoria, Australia. It encompasses Mount Arapiles, Mitre Rock, and the Tooan block. The park covers an area of 7,475 hectares (18,470 acres) and is valuable for nature conservation, with approximately 14% of the State's flora species represented in the Mount Arapiles area.

The major landmarks in the park are:

- Mount Arapiles; a prominent rock formation that is a popular rock climbing destination.
- Mitre Rock; a small outcrop of rock beside Lake Mitre that is also not far from Mount Arapiles.
- Tooan block; an area containing the remnants of woodlands that have elsewhere been largely cleared for agriculture.

The park is managed by Parks Victoria.

== Wildlife ==
=== Flora ===
Arapiles and its immediate vicinity are home to approximately 14% of the State's flora species, with wildflowers being particularly prominent in spring.

=== Fauna ===
The shingleback lizard (also known as the stumpytail) is commonly seen in the park during spring, summer and autumn. This slow moving and sleepy reptile feeds on insects, flowers and fruit and is quite harmless to humans.

There are many kangaroos inhabiting the bush around Arapiles. In order to preserve their habitat, many intermediate tracks have been closed to allow regrowth of the foliage. Now only the main tracks are used, especially close to the campgrounds.

The peregrine falcon, found worldwide, can often be seen around Mount Arapiles. The local population has suffered heavily from the effects of insecticides. It is considered threatened in Victoria as a result of this and is fully protected like all other plants and animals in the park. Occasionally, a pair of falcons will nest at Arapiles, and climbers usually notify the park ranger (and each other) should they come close to climbing areas.

== Amenity ==
There are a number of camping grounds within the park; the Centenary Park Campground (known as "The Pines"), the Yellow Gums (known as "The Gums"), and the North Campground. The Pines is open all year round and is by far the most popular site. It has a number of fireplaces for free use, though wood must be sourced from outside the state park. The Gums is often used by school groups on weekend trips and has camping at peak times only, while the North Campground sees frequent use by tourists.

There is a toilet block, rain water tank and dish-washing facilities. There is also bore water available, though Parks Victoria advises campers to bring their own as water may not always be available, especially during the harsh, dry summers. The campsite is essentially permanently occupied by climbers, who are subjected to a fees payable by an honesty system. From late 2012, fees increased from $2 per person per night to a vehicle/group-based fee of $15. After public debate this was changed shortly afterwards to $4 per person per night. By November 2013 the fee had risen again to $5 per person per night, and is expected to increase yet again as part of a statewide increase in park usage fees. The fees help in the maintaining of the park.

There are a number of satellite car parks around the mountain that allow for easier access to a number of areas that some might consider to be a considerable walking distance. Such car parks exist at Bushranger Bluff, Declaration Crag, and nearby Mitre Rock. There is also room for parking along the northern access road to the park near "The Pharos" and the "Watchtower Faces" climbing areas. There are two car parks in the summit area, which are used by tourists and climbers alike. The summit car parks are especially useful when accessing the northern climbing areas, provided safer access routes from above.

There is a picnic shelter for day visitors, as well as a public telephone, and an information board. The board briefly documents the history of the area with history, provides information on the activities available in the area, and gives advice on the local flora and fauna. A Telstra repeater tower provides mobile phone coverage, although it may be necessary to walk a few hundred metres down from the campground towards the road for adequate reception.

== See also ==
- Protected areas of Victoria
- Mount Arapiles
