= Michael Andrew Law =

- 羅卓睿
- Born: Law Cheuk Yui; 13 November 1982 (age 43); Hong Kong, China
- Known for: Painting, filmmaking
- Notable work: Humanity (2007), Somewhere beyond my reach (2005)
- Movement: Photorealism

Law Cheuk Yui, known professionally as Michael Andrew Law (Chinese: 羅卓睿; born 13 November 1982), is a Hong Kong artist, film producer, and art promoter, known in particular for his realist figurative works with Catholic themes.

== Career ==
Law's early work included comics and Illustrations, with pieces published in Catholic newspaper Kung Kao Po, and the Catholic Children's Bible. In 2006 he pivoted to fine art painting, with portraits of Catholic figures and Hong Kong celebrities, which have since been exhibited internationally. Law has also worked on a series of large-scale realist figurative works, exhibited at The Avenue of Stars and Queen Victoria Street, Hong Kong in 2009.

Law's public work primarily features paintings of pop culture icons, including representations of comic book characters, film and rock stars, and collages of historical art works. He has also completed oil painting portraits of figures from the Catholic Church, including Pope Benedict XVI and Mother Teresa.

Law's exhibit "From Unmanifest to Manifest in the Art of Hyper Pop Surrealism" helped raise fund for the charity mission of the David Lynch Foundation. The exhibition included oil painted portraits of Maharishi Mahesh Yogi, president John Hagelin, filmmaker David Lynch, and Bob Roth, chief executive of the David Lynch Foundation.

Law has also produced and directed several promotional music videos and two documentary films with his production group in Hong Kong.

== Chronology ==
- 2013 Exhibition at NatureArt Gallery DeTour 2013
- 2009 Exhibition The Avenue of Stars
- 2007 Guest and ExhibitionThe Peak Galleria Hong Kong
- 2007 Invited workshop exhibition, Elements, Hong Kong
- 2006 Collection by Cardinal Zen Ze-kiun and exhibited at Catholic Church of Hong Kong
- 2004–2007, Exhibition, Hong Kong Central Library
- 2005 illustrator for Kung Kao Po
- 2003 Group Exhibition, Hong Kong Convention and Exhibition Centre.
- 2003 Winner of I luv Hong Kong Painting Competition, exhibition at The Landmark (Hong Kong).

== Selected publications ==
- China: Contemporary Painting (ISBN 978-88-89431-07-8)
- International Contemporary Painting (ISBN 978-88-89431-07-8)
- Traditional & Contemporary Chinese Brush (ISBN 1-903975-19-0)
- A Tradition Redefined: Modern and Contemporary Chinese Ink Paintings from the Chu-tsing Li Collection (ISBN 0-300-12672-7)
- Pale Hair Girls Catalogue (Volume 1), 2014, Cheukyui Law, Michael Andrew Law, (ISBN 978-1503372115)
- iEgoism, Paperback, 2015, Michael Andrew Law, Publisher: XLibris, (ISBN 978-1499021240)
- Chinese Contemporary Artist Full Coloured Edition, Michael Andrew Law Studio, Michael Andrew Law, Hong Kong Art Basel, Michael Andrew Law Studio, (ISBN 978-1508758945)
- Christmas Everyday, Michael Andrew Law Studio, Michael Andrew Law, Studio Cheukyui, Florence Lawman Christmas Everyday, (ISBN 978-1505583922)
- Conceptz on woods, 2015,Michael Andrew Law Exhibition Catalogue , Studio Cheukyui, Los Angeles, Michael Andrew Law, Michael Andrew Law – Conceptz on woods, (ISBN 978-1511592086)
- iEgoism Paintings, 2015, Michael Andrew Law Exhibition Catalogue Volume 3, Studio Cheukyui, Los Angeles, Michael Andrew Law, Michael Andrew Law – iEgoism Paintings, (ISBN 978-1511592291)
