= List of performances by Pamela Stephenson =

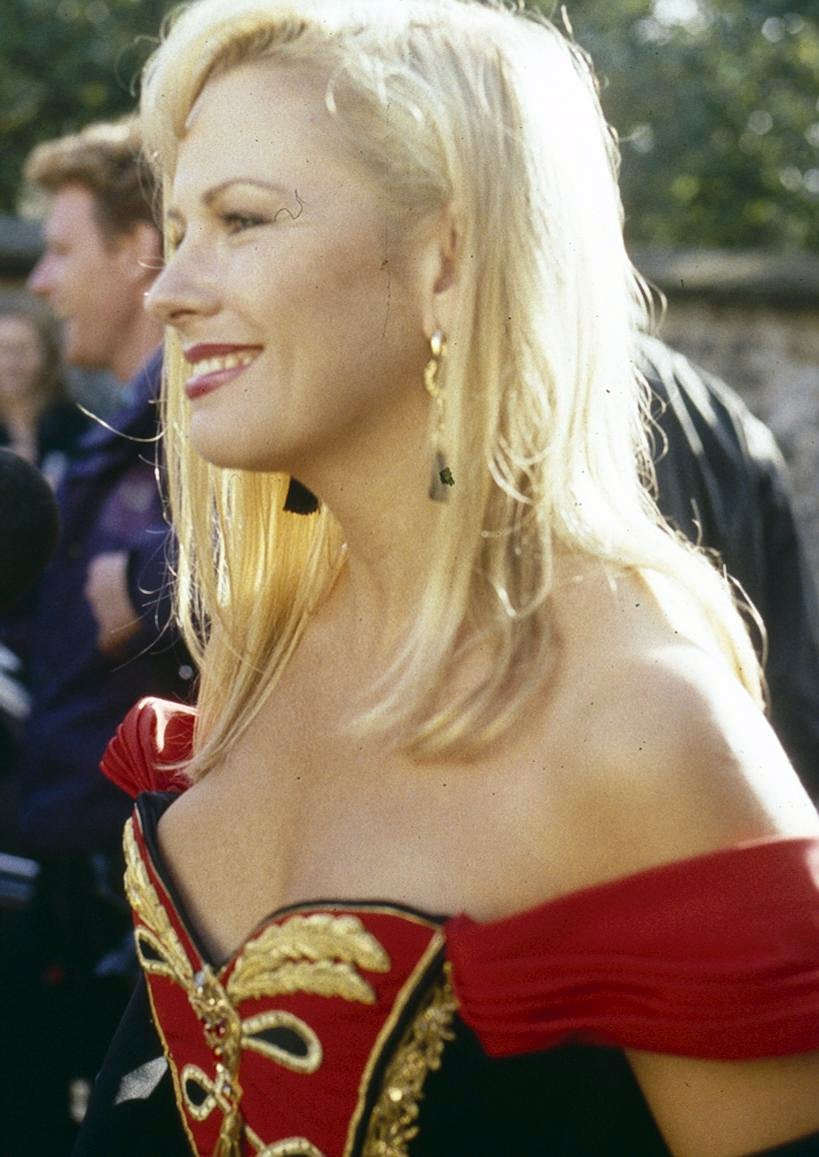
Stephenson in 1992

Pamela Stephenson was born on 4 December 1949 in Takapuna, Auckland. Stephenson studied at the National Institute of Dramatic Art (NIDA) in Sydney. After graduating from NIDA in 1970, she was engaged by Edgar Metcalfe on a six-month contract for the National Theatre Company, and performed in six plays at The Playhouse Theatre, Perth in 1971.

She gained prominence from her part in the 1980s UK comedy television sketch show Not The Nine O'Clock News (1979–1982), alongside Rowan Atkinson, Mel Smith and Griff Rhys Jones. Her other film appearances include History of the World, Part I (1981) and Superman III (1983). She presented a psychology-based interview show called Shrink Rap and was a finalist in the eighth series of the BBC1 television show Strictly Come Dancing. Since marrying Billy Connolly in 1989 she has sometimes been credited as Pamela Stephenson-Connolly.

== Filmography ==
=== Film ===
Year	Title	Role	Type
1970	Willy Willy	unknown role	Film short, Australia
1972	Private Collection	Mary-Ann Phillips	Feature film, Australia
1972	Yeoman of the Guard	unknown role	TV film, Australia
1974	The Violins of Saint-Jacques	Josephine	TV film, Australia
1975	McManus MPB	Kylie Charles	TV film, Australia
1977	Stand Up, Virgin Soldiers	Bernice	Feature film UK
1978	The Comeback	Linda	Feature film UK
1981	History of the World, Part I	Mademoiselle Rimbaud	Feature film US
1981	Doctors and Nurses	Permanent Wave	Feature film, Australia
1982	The Secret Policeman's Other Ball	Herself – Various roles	Feature film documentary UK
1982	Landscape: My Name Is Norman Bates	Janet	Film short UK
1983	Superman III	Lorelei	Feature film UK/US
1984	Scandalous	Fiona Maxwell Sayle	Feature film UK/US
1984	Bloodbath at the House of Death	Barbara Coyle	Feature film UK
1984	Finders Keepers	Georgiana Latimer	Feature film US
1986	Spitting Image: Down And Out In The White House	(voice)	TV film US
1987	Les Patterson Saves the World	Veronique Crudité	Feature film, Australia
1987	Those Dear Departed	Marilyn Falcon	Feature film, Australia

=== Television ===
Television
Year	Title	Role	Type
1971–1973	Division 4	Sue Lee/Lisa Clark	TV series, Australia, 2 episodes
1972; 1975	Homicide	Joan Kendall/Georgina Pearce	TV series, Australia, 2 episodes
1972	Matlock Police	Liz Johnson/Lisa Summers/Jenny Grant	TV series, Australia, 3 episodes
1972	Redheap	Milline Kneebone	TV series, Australia, 3 episodes
1973–1974	Ryan	Julie King	TV series, Australia, Lead role 39 episodes
1975	Behind The Legend	Fanny Cathcart	TV series, Australia, 1 episode
1976	Rush	Diane Quail	TV series, 1 episode
1976	The Lively Arts	Josephine	TV series UK, 1 episode
1976	Space: 1999	Michelle Osgood	TV series UK, 1 episode
1976;1978	Within These Walls	Prison Officer Dove	TV series UK, 2 episodes
1977	The New Avengers	Wendy	TV series UK, 1 episode
1977	Target	Susan Clegg	TV series UK, 1 episode
1978	Hazell	Gloria	TV series UK, 1 episode
1978	The Professionals	Maggie Briggs/Attractive Blonde/Nurse Emma Bolding	TV series UK, 3 episodes
1978	Something Special	Herself	TV series, Australia, 1 episode
1979	Tales of the Unexpected	Cathy	TV series UK, 1 episode
1979–1982	Not the Nine O'Clock News	Various roles (as Pam Stephenson)	TV series UK, 27 episodes
1980	Mike Yarwood in Persons	Herself	TV series, 1 episode
1980;1981	Friday Night, Saturday Morning	Herself	TV series UK, 2 episodes
1981	Call My Bluff	Herself	TV series UK, 2 episodes
1981	Scoop	Herself	TV series UK, 1 episode
1981	Funny Man	Iris Reade	TV series UK, 9 episodes
1981	Fundamental Frolics	Herself	TV series UK, 1 episode
1981; 1983	The Mike Walsh Show	Herself	TV series, Australia, 1 episode
1981	Parkinson in Australia	Herself	TV series, Australia, 1 episode
1982	Saturday Live	Herself	TV series, 1 episode
1982	The Royal Variety Performance 1982	Herself	TV special UK
1982	The Kenny Everett Video Show	Various roles	TV series UK, 1 episode
1983	Film '72	Herself	TV series UK, 1 episode
1983	The Don Lane Show	Herself	TV series, Australia, 1 episode
1983	The Mike Walsh Show	Guest - Herself	TV series, 1 episode, AUSTRALIA
1984	Aspel & Company	Herself	TV series UK, 1 episode
1984	Spitting Image	Various voices	TV series UK
1984	1984 TV Week Logie Awards	Guest - Herself arriving at event	TV special, AUSTRALIA
1984	Tonight with Bert Newton	Guest - Herself as Princess Diana of Wales	TV series, 1 episode, AUSTRALIA
1984–1985	Saturday Night Live	Various roles	TV series US, 18 episodes
1984	Hollywood Celebrates the Olympics	Herself	TV special US
1984	The Tonight Show Starring Johnny Carson	Herself	TV series US, 1 episode
1985	Friday People	Herself	TV series UK, 1 episode
1985	The Making Of 'Superman III'	Herself/Lorelei (uncredited)	TV special UK
1985	Des O'Connor Tonight	Herself, 1 episode	TV series UK
1985–1989	The Midday Show	Herself	TV series, Australia
1986	Saturday Live	Herself	TV series, 1 episode
1986	The Dame Edna Satellite Experience	Herself	TV special UK
1986	The Clive James Show	Herself	TV series UK, 1 episode
1986	The Bob Monkhouse Show	Herself	TV series UK, 1 episode
1986	Good Morning Australia	Herself	TV series, 1 episode
1986	Lost Empires	Lily Farris	TV miniseries UK, 2 episodes
1986	The 1986 Australian Film Institute Awards	Herself – Host	TV special
1987	Ratman	Wombat Woman	TV series UK, 3 episodes
1987	The Grand Knockout Tournament	Herself	TV special UK
1988	The N.S.W. Royal Bicentennial Concert	Herself	TV special, Australia
1989	Lifestyles of the Rich and Famous	Herself	TV series UK, 1 episode
1989	A Night of Comic Relief 2	Herself	TV special UK
1989	The Bert Newton Show	Herself	TV series, 1 episode
1989	Open to Question	Herself	TV series UK, 1 episode
1989	Wogan	Herself	TV series UK, 1 episode
1989	Cilla's Goodbye to the '80s	Herself	TV special UK
1989	Joy to the World	Herself	TV special UK
1990	Dame Edna Experience	Herself	TV series UK, 1 episode
1990	Hey Hey It's Saturday	Herself (Red Faces)	TV series, Australia, 1 episode
1990	Tonight Live with Steve Vizard	Herself	TV series, Australia, 1 episode
1990	MTV	Herself	TV series, Australia, 1 episode
1990	Let's Do Lunch... And Save The World	Herself	TV special UK
1991	Comic Relief	Herself	TV special UK
1993	Sex	Herself – Host	TV series, Australia
1993	Ray Martin's Top Sorts & Superstars	Herself	TV special, Australia
1993	Ray Martin at Midday	Herself	TV series, Australia, 1 episode
1993	Inside Edition	Herself	TV series, Australia/US
1994	Columbo	Jennifer Chambers – Soap opera actress	TV series US, 1 episode
1994	Midday with Derryn Hinch	Herself	TV series, Australia, 1 episode
1999	Billy Connolly: Erect for 30 Years	Herself	Video UK
2001; 2003	Parkinson	Herself	TV series UK, 2 episodes
2001	Rove Live	Herself	TV series, Australia, 1 episode
2002	Billy Connolly: A BAFTA Tribute	Herself	TV special UK
2003	The Late Late Show	Herself	TV series IRELAND, 1 episode
2003	Today with Des and Mel	Herself	TV series UK, 2 episodes
2005	Kelly	Herself	TV series UK, 1 episode
2005	Good Morning Australia	Herself	TV series, 1 episode
2006	The Paul O'Grady Show	Herself	TV series UK, 1 episode
2006	Life of Pryor: The Richard Pryor Story	Herself	TV special UK
2006	Murder or Mutiny	Herself	TV series, Australia
2007	Richard & Judy	Herself (as Dr Pamela Connolly)	TV series UK, 1 episode
2007	Mornings with Kerri-Anne	Herself	TV series, Australia, 1 episode
2007	Enough Rope with Andrew Denton	Herself	TV series, Australia, 1 episode
2007	The Funny Side of the News	Herself	TV special UK
2007;2014	Loose Women	Herself (as Pamela Stephenson Connolly, Dr. Pamela Stephenson Connolly)	TV series UK, 4 episodes
2007–2010	Shrink Rap	Herself – Psychologist (as Dr Pamela Connolly)	TV series UK, 14 episodes
2010;2011	Daybreak	Herself	TV series UK, 2 episodes
2010	The Graham Norton Show	Herself	TV series UK, 1 episode
2010	TV Burp	Herself	TV series UK, 1 episode
2010	Breakfast	Herself – Celebrity dancer	TV series UK, 2 episodes
2010–2016	Strictly Come Dancing	Herself – Contestant	TV series UK, 28 episodes
2010–2011	Strictly Come Dancing: It Takes Two	Herself (as Dr. Pamela Stephenson)	TV series UK, 15 episodes
2011	That Saturday Night Show	Herself	TV series UK, 1 episode
2011	The One Show	Herself	TV series UK, 1 episode
2011	The TV Book Club	Herself	TV series UK, 1 episode
2011	My Favourite Joke	Herself	TV series UK, 2 episodes
2011	The Book Show	Herself	TV series UK, 1 episode
2011–2012	This Morning	Herself	TV series UK, 7 episodes
2012	My Life in Books	Herself	TV series UK, 1 episode
2012	War Hero in my Family	Herself	TV series UK, 1 episode
2012	Today	Herself	TV series, Australia, 1 episode
2012	Today Extra	Herself	TV series, Australia, 1 episode
2012	ABC News Breakfast	Herself	TV series, Australia, 1 episode
2012	Sunrise	Herself	TV series, Australia, 1 episode
2012	The Morning Show	Herself	TV series, Australia, 1 episode
2012	Q&A	Herself – Panel	TV series, Australia, 1 episode
2012	Intrepid Journeys	Herself	TV series NZ
2014	Weekend	Herself	TV series UK, 1 episode
2015	One Plus One	Herself – Guest	TV series, Australia, 1 episode
2020	Billy Connolly: It's Been A Pleasure	Herself (as Pamela Stephenson-Connolly)	TV special UK
2021	Billy Connolly: My Absolute Pleasure	Herself (as Pamela Stephenson-Connolly)	TV special UK
2022	Billy Connolly Does...	Herself	TV series UK, 7 episodes
