= The Lost Empire =

The Lost Empire may refer to:

- Tarzan and the Lost Empire, a 1929 novel by Edgar Rice Burroughs
- Lost Empires (novel), a 1965 novel by J. B. Priestley

- Lost Empires, a 1986 television miniseries adapted from the Priestley novel

- The Lost Empire (1984 film), a fantasy adventure directed by Jim Wynorski
- The Lost Empire (miniseries), or The Monkey King, a 2001 American two-episode television series
- Atlantis: The Lost Empire, a 2001 Disney animated feature

- Atlantis: The Lost Empire (soundtrack), the soundtrack album of the Disney film
- Atlantis: The Lost Empire (video game), a game based on the Disney film

- Lost Empire, a 2007 turn-based strategy computer game by Pollux Gamelabs
- Lost Empire (novel), a 2010 adventure novel by Clive Cussler

== See also ==
- Category:Former countries
- Category:Former empires
