= Pamela Stephenson =

New Zealand psychologist and actress (born 1949)

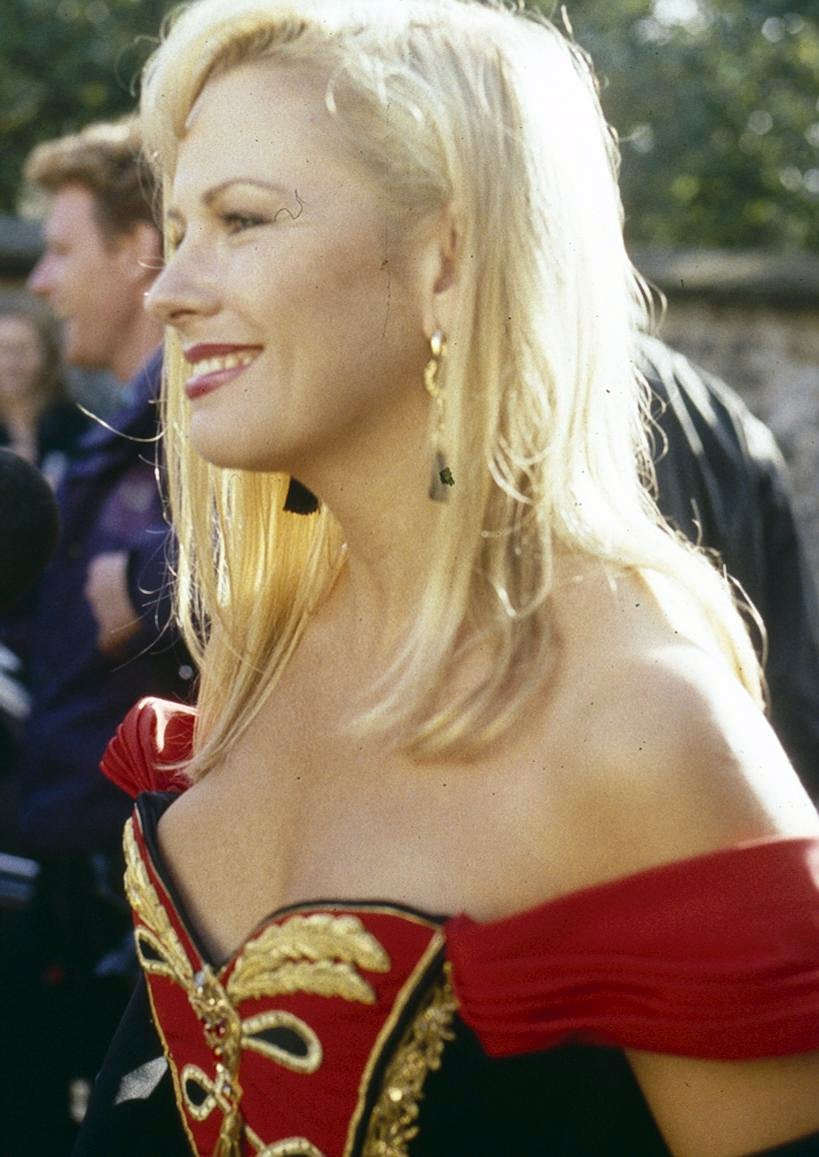
- Stephenson in 1992
- Born: Pamela Stephenson; 4 December 1949 (age 76); Takapuna, Auckland, New Zealand
- Citizenship: Australia (by descent); New Zealand (by birth); United Kingdom (naturalised)
- Education: University of New South Wales (attended); National Institute of Dramatic Art (BFA); Antioch University, Los Angeles (attended); California Graduate Institute (MA, PsyD)
- Occupations: Actress; clinical psychologist; writer; comedian
- Years active: 1971–present
- Known for: Not the Nine O'Clock News; Saturday Night Live
- Works: Full list
- Spouses: Nicholas Ball (m. 1978; div. 1984); Billy Connolly (m. 1989)
- Children: 3

Pamela Stephenson, Lady Connolly (born 4 December 1949) is a New Zealand-born Australian and British psychologist, writer, actress and comedian. She moved with her family to Australia in 1953 and studied at the National Institute of Dramatic Art (NIDA). After playing several stage and television roles, Stephenson immigrated to the United Kingdom in 1976.

Stephenson appeared in British television shows, including Space: 1999, New Avengers, The Professionals and Tales of the Unexpected before her breakthrough role alongside Rowan Atkinson, Mel Smith and Griff Rhys Jones in the satirical sketch show Not the Nine O'Clock News (1979–1982). In 1981, for her part in that series, Stephenson was shortlisted for BAFTAs in the Actress and Light Entertainment performance categories. She appeared in the films History of the World, Part I (1981) and Superman III (1983), and from 1984 to 1985, she was cast in season 10 of the American comedy-sketch television show Saturday Night Live.

In the late 1980s, Stephenson co-founded the protest group Parents for Safe Food, which successfully campaigned for a UK ban on the possibly carcinogenic plant growth regulator Alar being sprayed on apples and pears for human consumption. Since a career-change to clinical psychology and obtaining a doctorate, Stephenson has written several books, including two about her husband Billy Connolly. She has presented a psychology themed interview show called Shrink Rap (2007), and has written Head Case: Treat Yourself to Better Mental Health (2009) and Sex Life: How Our Sexual Encounters and Experiences Define Who We Are (2011). Since 2007, Stephenson has written a sexual-advice column for The Guardian. She was a finalist in the eighth series of the BBC television show Strictly Come Dancing in 2010. Her autobiography The Varnished Untruth was published in 2012.

== Early life ==
Pamela Stephenson was born on 4 December 1949 in Takapuna, Auckland, New Zealand. In 1953, she moved to Australia with her scientist parents and her two sisters. She attended Boronia Park Primary School, Sydney, and then Sydney Church of England Girls' Grammar School, Darlinghurst. According to Stephenson's autobiography, she was raped at age 16 by a 35-year-old heroin addict and contracted a sexually transmitted infection (STI). She concealed the incident but when her parents learnt of her infection, they expelled her from the family home; according to Stephenson: "I remember the feeling well, because I still experience it every time someone rejects me, even in some relatively small way". Stephenson studied at the University of New South Wales but soon switched to the National Institute of Dramatic Art (NIDA) in Sydney.

== Performing career ==
=== Early career ===
After graduating from NIDA in 1970, Edgar Metcalfe employed Stephenson on a six-month contract for the National Theatre Company, and she performed in six plays at The Playhouse Theatre, Perth, in 1971. Meanwhile, she appeared with Chips Rafferty in the short film Willy Willy (1970 or 1971). Subsequent theatre roles included a part in Peer Gynt and June in the musical Gypsy. Stephenson also appeared in the television programmes Division 4, Homicide and Matlock Police. She then starred in the film Private Collection (1973). Stephenson starred as Elsie in the ABC-TV production of the opera The Yeomen of the Guard (1972). From 1972 to 1973, she played Julie King in the Australian television series Ryan and in 1974, she played Josephine in the Australian Broadcasting Corporation's (ABC) production of Malcolm Williamson's opera The Violins of Saint-Jacques.

In 1976, Stephenson moved to the UK, where she worked in film and television; her roles included Michelle Osgood in the Space: 1999 episode "Catacombs of the Moon" (1976); Wendy in New Avengers episode "Angels of Death" (1977); and a supporting role in "Man from the South", the inaugural episode of Roald Dahl's Tales of the Unexpected (1979). Stephenson played three roles in the British crime-action television series The Professionals in 1978. According to media scholar Leon Hunt, a scene in which Stephenson plays a nurse from the inside of whose blouse one of the leads retrieves a live hand-grenade epitomises the programme. She also played a nurse in Stand Up, Virgin Soldiers (1977).

Among Stephenson's first appearances in the UK was a live, on-stage role in The Comic Strip with leads Rik Mayall, Peter Richardson and Alexei Sayle at Raymond Revuebar in Soho. This was not a happy experience; according to an interview she gave in 2014: "Doing stand-up was like a war with everyone playing this game of 'I can be funnier than you' ".

=== Not the Nine O'Clock News ===
Stephenson gained prominence with her part in the UK sketch-comedy television show Not the Nine O'Clock News (1979–1982) alongside Rowan Atkinson, Mel Smith and Griff Rhys Jones. It was a satirical sketch show, influenced by the surreal humour of Monty Python's Flying Circus. In The Guinness Book of Classic British TV, Paul Cornell, Martin Day and Keith Topping wrote Stephenson "took up the punk ethic of outraging the audience with directness", and that "most critics were united in their praise of Atkinson and Stephenson". Stephenson caricatured newsreaders Angela Rippon and Jan Leeming in the show. In one sketch, she parodied musician Kate Bush with a song called "Oh England, My Leotard", which references Bush's song "Oh England My Lionheart" and is musically similar to "Them Heavy People". Bush's biographer Graeme Thomson said the spoof has "clever and very funny" elements.

In one Not the Nine O'Clock News sketch that became famous, Stephenson played a car-rental receptionist who, when asked by a customer if he can use an American Express card, she replies: "That will do nicely, sir, and would you like to rub my tits, too?", and unbuttons her blouse. The sketch satirises the slogan "That'll do nicely, sir" the American Express company used in its advertising. According to a 2007 editorial in Art Monthly, this sketch "perfectly captured the 'greed is good' spirit of the 80s, the legacy of which is still being felt". The Guardian columnist Simon Hoggart said the sketch is "[not] exactly subversive".

Not the Nine O'Clock News was awarded the Golden Rose for innovation at the 1980 Montreux Festival. It won the BAFTA for Best Light Entertainment Programme in 1981, and Stephenson was shortlisted in the performance categories Actress and Light Entertainment performance. Spin-offs from the show included books, record albums, and the stage show Not in Front of the Audience. Stephenson made a comedy-sketch television pilot called Stephenson's Rocket, which was not taken up.

=== 1980s and 1990s ===
Stephenson acted in Mel Brooks' comedy film History of the World, Part I (1981); she later said she found it a dull experience due the lack of influence she had over the production. In 1982, she starred in the West End production of Joseph Papp's version of The Pirates of Penzance; The Times critic Irving Wardle wrote Stephenson "reveals unsuspected coloratura powers as Mabel, but the part wastes her comic gift".

Stephenson appeared in the music video for Landscape's single "Norman Bates" (1981); the video is a pastiche of Alfred Hitchcock's movie Psycho (1960) with Stephenson in the Janet Leigh role. Also in 1981, Stephenson appeared in performances of Clive James's 2,000-line poem "Charles Charming's Challenges On The Pathway To The Throne", which he wrote in expectation of Prince Charles announcing his engagement. The poem was performed for a two-week run in London starting in June, with James, Stephenson and Russell Davies, and was and released as an album. The following year, Stephenson released a four-track double single; the tracks were written by Richard James Burgess and one featured Gary Kemp on guitar. Several regional newspapers poorly reviewed the single. Stephenson was the subject of an episode of Behind the Scenes with ... (1981), a BBC1 series about the creative process. David Williams of Daily Post said the programme "tarnished her image a little". In 1982, Stephenson was a guest on BBC Radio 4 show Desert Island Discs.

Director Richard Lester called Stephenson for a part in Superman III (1983) on the basis of her performances in Not The Nine O'Clock News. Her character was Lorelei Ambrosia, the Kant-reading girlfriend of the film's antagonist Ross Webster. In the opening sequence, Ambrosia is the foil for a series of sight gags that reference Lester's The Knack ...and How to Get It (1965); the character also has a love scene with Superman at the top of the Statue of Liberty. Joe Baltake of the Philadelphia Daily News rated Stephenson's performance in the film as "excellent" and Steve Jensen highlighted praised her performance in The Berkeley Gazette but Colin Greenland of Imagine said she was "completely wasted in a part which would have been too dumb for Goldie Hawn". Stephenson starred alongside John Gielgud and Robert Hays in Scandalous (1984), which Rob Cohen directed; critic Ben McCann said the film is "notable only for wasting the talents of all concerned". Also in 1984, Stephenson appeared in the comedy horror film Bloodbath at the House of Death, which according to Barry Forshaw's negative review in Starburst is a "shameful waste of talented performers like Pamela Stephenson". Stephenson's performance in Finders Keepers (1984) received mixed reviews; Andrew Yule, in his biography of the director Lester, praised "a deft appearance by the wonderfully funny, ridiculously underrated Pamela Stephenson" but in 1989, Jon Casimir wrote: "As sure an indicator of imminent mediocrity as any, Pamela Stephenson is cast as a supporting actress".

In 1984–1985, Stephenson was cast in the 10th season of the American comedy sketch show Saturday Night Live (SNL), making her the show's second—and only female—cast member to be born outside North America, joining Tony Rosato, and as of 2019, the show's only New-Zealander cast member. Her characters on the show included Billy Idol and Cyndi Lauper. In a retrospective article about SNL in Rolling Stone, Rob Sheffield described Stephenson as "a bright spot in a weak season". In the UK in 1986, Stephenson hosted an episode of the television show Saturday Live. The same year, Stephenson appeared in the television drama Lost Empires; The Daily Telegraph critic Charles Clover called her was one of the positives in a dull series. In 1987, Stephenson appeared in Prince Edward's charity television special The Grand Knockout Tournament with many other celebrities. She had leading parts in the black comedy film Those Dear Departed (1987) and the critically-panned and commercially unsuccessful film Les Patterson Saves the World (1987). She toured the one-woman theatre shows Naughty Night Nurses Without Panties Down Under (1985) and Scandalous Behaviour (1987).

Authors Mike Lepine and Mark Leigh, who had worked with Adrian Edmondson on the 1986 comedy book How to Be a Complete Bastard, approached Stephenson to collaborate on a companion volume How to Be a Complete Bitch, which was published in 1987. How to Be a Complete Bitch became a top-ten bestseller in the UK and sold over 300,000 copies by October that year. Stephenson told Candida Baker of The Age she was pleased the book was described as "sexist, violent and crude". The book spawned an eponymous board game.

Stephenson made her radio acting debut in the BBC Radio 4 play The Spectre of Ernie Pike (1989). She presented Move Over Darling (1990), a series of five BBC television programmes about the role of women at work and at home; the show had an all-female editorial team with Janet Street-Porter as executive producer. In 1993, Stephenson hosted the Australian lifestyle programme Sex, which The Sydney Morning Herald's critic criticised as being "prurient".

== Psychology and writing ==
According to her autobiography, after some years of consideration and having met all of her goals in comedy, Stephenson decided to switch to a career in psychology. In the early 1990s, after studying at Antioch University in the United States, Stephenson qualified as a clinical psychologist. In 1996, she obtained a doctorate in clinical psychology from the California Graduate Institute and set up a private practice. Her doctoral thesis topic was the "intra-psychic experience of fame". With an interest in sex therapy, she co-founded the Los Angeles Sexuality Centre and became an adjunct professor at the California Graduate Institute. Stephenson's research included an investigation into the lives of transgender people in Samoa, Tonga and India.

In 2002, Stephenson published Billy, a biography of her husband Billy Connolly, which Kirkus Reviews considered "balances wifely affection with professional analysis". It was a best-seller in Britain. Two years later, she released Bravemouth, a diary-style book focusing on Connolly in the year following his sixtieth birthday. Robbie Hudson of The Sunday Times wrote that it was "insubstantial" and "syrupy", while Kirkus Reviews felt that, like the earlier book, it contained "incisive revelations".

Starting in 2004, Stephenson took a year-long sailing voyage that followed a route Robert Louis Stevenson had taken; she wrote about the experience in Treasure Islands: Sailing the South Seas in the Wake of Fanny and Robert Louis Stevenson (2005). Kirkus Reviews described the book as "earnest and endearing", and said the illustrations "help make this a dreamy, empowering retirement fantasy". The following year, Connolly travelled on her family's boat to follow the South Pacific route her great-great-grandfather Samuel "Salty Sam" Stephenson took. The journey was documented in a four-part series shown on Sky Television and in her book Murder or Mutiny: Mystery, piracy and adventure in the Spice Islands (2006).

Shrink Rap, in which Stephenson conducted psychology-based interviews with celebrities including Salman Rushdie, Carrie Fisher and Robin Williams premiered on More4 in 2007. Her book Head Case: Treat Yourself to Better Mental Health was published that year, and was followed by Sex Life: How Our Sexual Encounters and Experiences Define Who We Are in 2011. Since 2007, Stephenson has written a weekly advice column called "Sexual Healing" for The Guardian in which she responds to reader-submitted sexual issues and scenarios. At a time when celebrities were being engaged to write advice columns, Stephenson was unusual in having a relevant qualification. Starting in 2009, she also wrote a relationships-advice column called "Love Matters" for Australian Women's Weekly. In 2009, she received an honorary degree from Robert Gordon University in recognition of "her achievement in the field of human sexuality where she has made a marked, sustained and international contribution".

Stephenson competed in the eighth series of the BBC1 television show Strictly Come Dancing (2010), in which she was partnered by James Jordan. They reached the final and finished third, and Stephenson returned to the show for the 2016 Christmas Special. Stephenson was a guest on the BBC Radio 3 programme Private Passions in 2010, where her music choices included pieces by Vincenzo Bellini, Erik Satie and Claude Debussy.

Her autobiography The Varnished Untruth: My Story was published in 2012. Lee Randall of The Scotsman described it as "compelling and emotion-churning", and Jane Wheatley of The Sydney Morning Herald said there is plenty of "humour and vivid anecdote", and that "the real heft of this book and its leitmotif is Stephenson's childhood experience of being rejected by her parents; a legacy that dogs her life to this day".

Stephenson formed a dance company with Brazilian lambazouk dancer Braz Dos Santos, and wrote and produced a dance-drama stage production called Brazouka. Harley Medcalf was lead producer and Arlene Phillips directed. The biographical show told the story of Dos Santos, who performed in the show, and his dancing. It premiered at the Edinburgh Fringe Festival in August 2014 and toured South Africa and Australia until January 2015.

During a lockdown of the COVID-19 pandemic of the early 2020s, Stephenson wrote Bum Farto – The Musical about the 1970s Florida fire chief Joseph "Bum" Farto. On the podcast Conan O'Brien Needs a Friend, Sarah Silverman revealed in 2023 that Pamela Stephenson was her therapist.

== Politics and activism ==
At the 1987 United Kingdom general election, Stephenson was a candidate for the Blancmange Throwers Party in the parliamentary constituency of Windsor and Maidenhead; her campaign pledges included "free blancmanges for pensioners and the unemployed". She finished with 328 votes, the fewest of all of the candidates. (Note: Her party affiliation was reported as "I Want to Put a Blancmange Down Terry Wogan's Y-fronts party" and "Put a Blancmange Down Terry Wogan's Y-fronts party")

Stephenson co-founded the pressure group Parents for Safe Food group after becoming concerned about the spraying of the plant-growth-regulating chemical daminozide (also known as Alar), which is believed to be carcinogenic, on apples and pears for human consumption. In 1989, she led a group of celebrity mothers who went to 10 Downing Street to hand Prime Minister Margaret Thatcher a petition calling for a ban on the use of daminozide. Use of the chemical to spray fruit was banned in the UK later that year; news sources attributed the ban to Stephenson's group's campaign. In 2010, Stephenson travelled to the Democratic Republic of Congo with the international medical-aid charity Medical Emergency Relief International (Merlin) to meet survivors of sexual-and-gender-based violence against women.

== Personal life ==
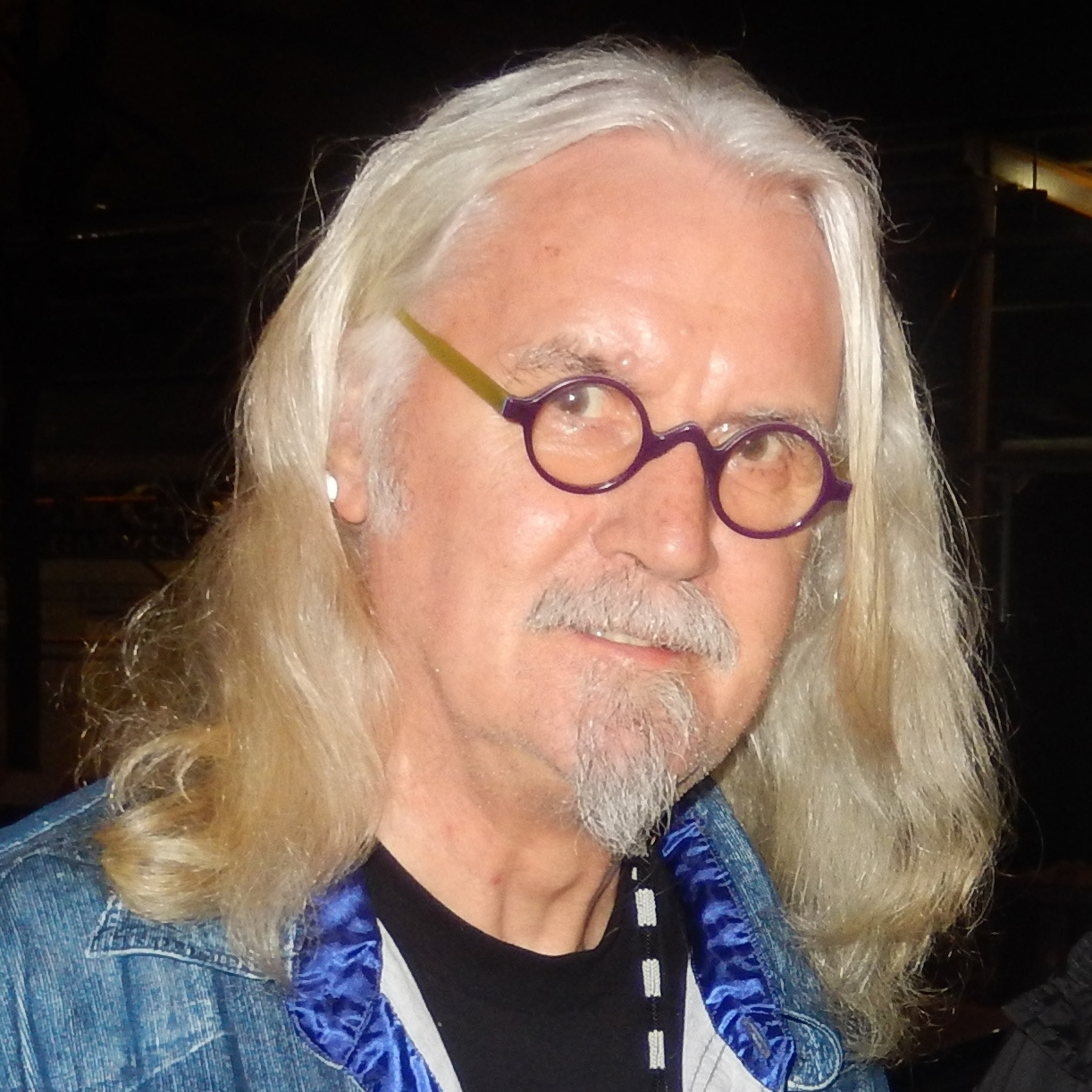
Billy Connolly (pictured in 2016) and Stephenson were married in 1989.

In 1978, after filming an episode of Hazell with its star Nicholas Ball, Stephenson and Ball married. Stephenson converted to Buddhism in 1979, shortly before she joined the cast of Not the Nine O'Clock News. Stephenson left Ball to start a relationship with Billy Connolly, and she and Ball divorced in 1984. Connolly and Stephenson first met in 1979, when they filmed a sketch for Not the Nine O'Clock News and had lunch together. The following year, Stephenson and Connolly met again backstage at one of Connolly's shows. The pair lived together for ten years before they married in Fiji on 20 December 1989; Stephenson was "given away" by the comedian Barry Humphries. The couple have three daughters together.

Stephenson and Connolly moved to Los Angeles in 1991, and later alternated between homes in New York and Scotland. In 2002, on the BBC Radio 4 programme Devout Sceptics, Stephenson told Bel Mooney through Buddhism, "I could at last feel I had begun life as a wonderful piece of creation, that a person doesn't have to struggle every day to overcome darkness and sin".

Connolly was knighted in 2017, meaning Stephenson can formally style herself as Lady Connolly. As of September 2022, the couple lived in Key West, Florida.

== Bibliography ==
Books

- Stephenson, Pamela; Lepine, Mike; Leigh, Mark (1987). How to Be a Complete Bitch. Virgin. ISBN 978-0-86369-224-6.
- Stephenson, Pamela (2002). Billy. Overlook Hardcover. ISBN 978-1-58567-308-7.
- Stephenson, Pamela (2003). Bravemouth: Living with Billy Connolly. Headline Book Publishing. ISBN 978-0-7553-1284-9.
- Stephenson, Pamela (2005). Treasure Islands: Sailing the South Seas in the Wake of Fanny and Robert Louis Stevenson. Headline Book Publishing. ISBN 978-0-7553-1285-6.
- Stephenson, Pamela (2006). Murder or Mutiny : Mystery, piracy and adventure in the Spice Islands. Weidenfeld & Nicolson. ISBN 978-1-84188-270-3.
- Stephenson, Pamela (2009). Head Case: Treat Yourself to Better Mental Health. Headline Book Publishing. ISBN 978-0-7553-1282-5.
- Stephenson, Pamela (2011). Sex Life: How Our Sexual Encounters and Experiences Define Who We Are. Vermilion. ISBN 978-0-09-192985-5.
- Stephenson, Pamela (2012). The Varnished Untruth: My Story. Simon & Schuster. ISBN 978-1-84983-921-1.

Book chapter

- Stephenson Connolly, Pamela (2014). "Whispers, Vanities, Covert and Overt Fury". In Tamasailau M. Suaalii-Sauni; Wendt, Albert; Mo'a, Vitolia Mo'a; Fuamatu, Naomi; Upolu Luma Va'ai; Whaitiri, Reina; Filipo, Stephen L. (eds.). Whispers and Vanities: Samoan Indigenous Knowledge and Religion. Huia. pp. 203–11. ISBN 978-1-77550-160-2.
