= Going On (disambiguation) =

"Going On" is a 2008 song by Gnarls Barkley.

Going On may also refer to:

- Going On (play), by Charles Dennis
- "Going On" (Our Girl), a 2016 television episode
- "Going On" (Craig David song), from the 2018 album The Time Is Now
- "Goin' On", a 1980 song by the Beach Boys
