= Mirror, Mirror (1979 film) =

- Genre: Drama
- Written by: Leah Appet; Charles Dennis
- Directed by: Joanna Lee
- Starring: Janet Leigh; Lee Meriwether; Loretta Swit; Robert Vaughn; Peter Bonerz; Shelley Smith
- Music by: Jimmie Haskell
- Country of origin: United States
- Original language: English

Production
- Executive producer: Joanna Lee
- Producer: Jerry Adler
- Cinematography: Ben Colman
- Editor: Carroll Sax
- Running time: 120 minutes
- Production company: Christiana Productions

Original release
- Network: NBC
- Release: October 10, 1979

Mirror, Mirror is a 1979 American made-for-television drama film which explores the world of cosmetic surgery. Directed by Joanna Lee, the film stars Janet Leigh, Lee Meriwether, Loretta Swit, Robert Vaughn, Peter Bonerz and originally aired on NBC on October 10, 1979.

== Plot ==
Three women – Millie Gorman, Sandy McLaren and Vanessa Wagner – are having problems in their lives which they believe plastic surgery can solve. Millie is a wealthy widow convinced that her sex appeal has waned along with her looks and youth; Sandy is a bored housewife whose husband regards her more as a friend than a lover; and ex-model Vanessa, who now owns a modeling agency, fears the years showing on her face will ruin any chance she has of reuniting with a former lover.

Eventually, Sandy gets breast implants which have the opposite of the desired effect on her husband; Vanessa gets an eye-lift, only to find out her ex-lover wasn't worth the trouble; and Millie, in desperation to look younger and more attractive to men, puts her life in jeopardy when she has a face-lift despite her doctor's warnings.

== Cast ==
- Janet Leigh as Millie Gorman
- Lee Meriwether as Vanessa Wagner
- Loretta Swit as Sandy McLaren
- Robert Vaughn as Michael Jacoby
- Peter Bonerz as Andrew McLaren
- Robin Mattson as Pamela Gorman
- Walter Brooke as Dr. Samuel Shaw
