= The Breaking Point (1961 film) =

British film by Lance Comfort

- U.S. release poster
- Directed by: Lance Comfort
- Screenplay by: Peter Lambert
- Based on: The Breaking Point; 1957 novel by Laurence Meynell
- Produced by: Peter Lambert
- Starring: Peter Reynolds; Dermot Walsh; Joanna Dunham; Lisa Gastoni
- Cinematography: Frank Drake; Basil Emmott
- Edited by: Peter Pitt
- Music by: Albert Elms
- Production company: Butcher's Film Service
- Distributed by: Butcher's Film Service
- Release date: 20 February 1961
- Running time: 59 minutes
- Country: England
- Language: English

The Breaking Point (also known as The Great Armored Car Swindle for the US release) is a 1961 second feature British crime film directed by Lance Comfort and starring Peter Reynolds, Dermot Walsh, Joanna Dunham and Lisa Gastoni. The screenplay was by Peter Lambert based on the 1957 novel by Laurence Meynell.

It was one of several British crime films starring Reynolds.

== Plot ==
Eric Winlatter works at a currency printing company. When the company wins a contract to print banknotes for the Middle East state of Lavadore, he is persuaded to help revolutionaries hijack the currency shipment. Cherry, his neglected wife, becomes suspicious and tells journalist Robert Wade. Eric is killed when he falls out of the villains' escape plane.

== Cast ==
- Peter Reynolds as Eric Winlatter
- Dermot Walsh as Robert Wade
- Joanna Dunham as Cherry Winlatter
- Lisa Gastoni as Eva
- Jack Allen as Ernest Winlatter
- Brian Cobby as Peter de Savory
- Arnold Diamond as Telling
- Eric Corrie as Wilson
- Desmond Cullum-Jones as Evans
- Geoffrey Denton as debt collector
- Richard Golding as Mintos
- John G. Heller as Mel
- Gertan Klauber as Lofty
- John Lawrence as security officer
- Mercia Mansfield as Ernest's secretary
- Charles Russell as Cappel

== Critical reception ==
Variety said the film's greatest strength was its brevity."

Kine Weekly said "Taut crime melodrama, unfolded against a convincing London backdrop."

The Monthly Film Bulletin wrote: "A waste of one of Laurence Meynell's better novels, this trimmed to the bone thriller has little to offer apart from a well-staged gambling party sequence, a speedy climax and some desultory rough-and-tumble."

The Radio Times Guide to Films gave the film 1/5 stars, writing: "If stars were awarded for plot contrivance, this low-budget thriller would be well into double figures. There's a banknote printer with a gambling debt, revolutionaries with a counterfeiting plan, an armed robbery, a bomb, a touch of adultery and a speeding plane finale. Not one character rings true nor is one fragment of the storyline credible."
