= Bum Farto =

American fire chief and drug dealer (1919–1986)

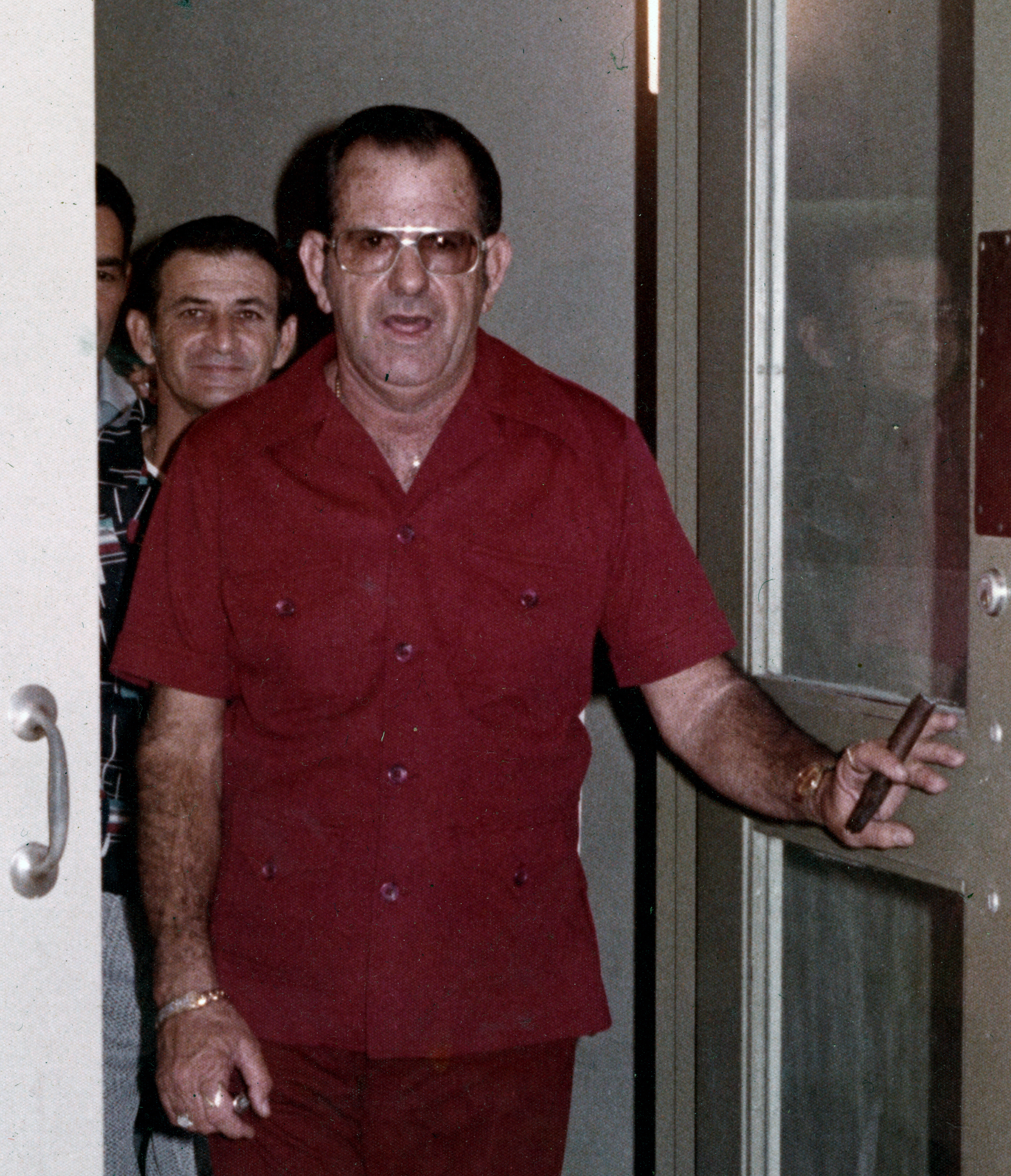
- Farto c. 1970
- Born: Joseph Anthony Farto; July 3, 1919; Key West, Florida, US
- Disappeared: February 16, 1976 (aged 56); Miami, Florida, US
- Status: Declared dead in absentia on May 21, 1986 (aged 66)
- Other name: José Farto
- Occupation: Fire chief
- Spouse: Esther Beiro (m. 1955)
- Conviction: Cocaine and marijuana dealing

Joseph Anthony "Bum" Farto (July 3, 1919 – disappeared February 16, 1976, declared dead May 21, 1986) was an American fire chief and convicted drug dealer in Key West, Florida, who disappeared in 1976. He was one of several politically connected Key West individuals arrested as part of a sting operation known as Operation Conch.

Farto disappeared shortly after his conviction and was declared dead in absentia in 1986. The circumstances of his disappearance led to theories that he had fled from the United States, possibly to Costa Rica or Spain, and he became a popular figure in Key West popular culture. His life and disappearance have been the subject of a 2020 podcast series and a 2021 Pamela Stephenson play.

== Early life ==
Farto's parents were Spanish immigrants Juana (née Díaz) and Juan Farto. Juana was from the Canary Islands, while Juan, a restaurant owner, was from Budiño, Pontevedra, having immigrated to Key West via Cuba in 1902. Farto was the youngest of three children, and his mother died when he was young. As a child, he often spent time at Key West's Fire Station No. 1, which was behind his house. He was nicknamed Bum because he fetched the firefighters' coffee and shined their shoes, and at 10 he first snuck onto a fire truck that was answering a call.

Farto quit school when his father died in 1937. He worked for the National Youth Administration and his first job was as a funeral home worker. Farto married Esther Beiro in 1955.

== Career ==
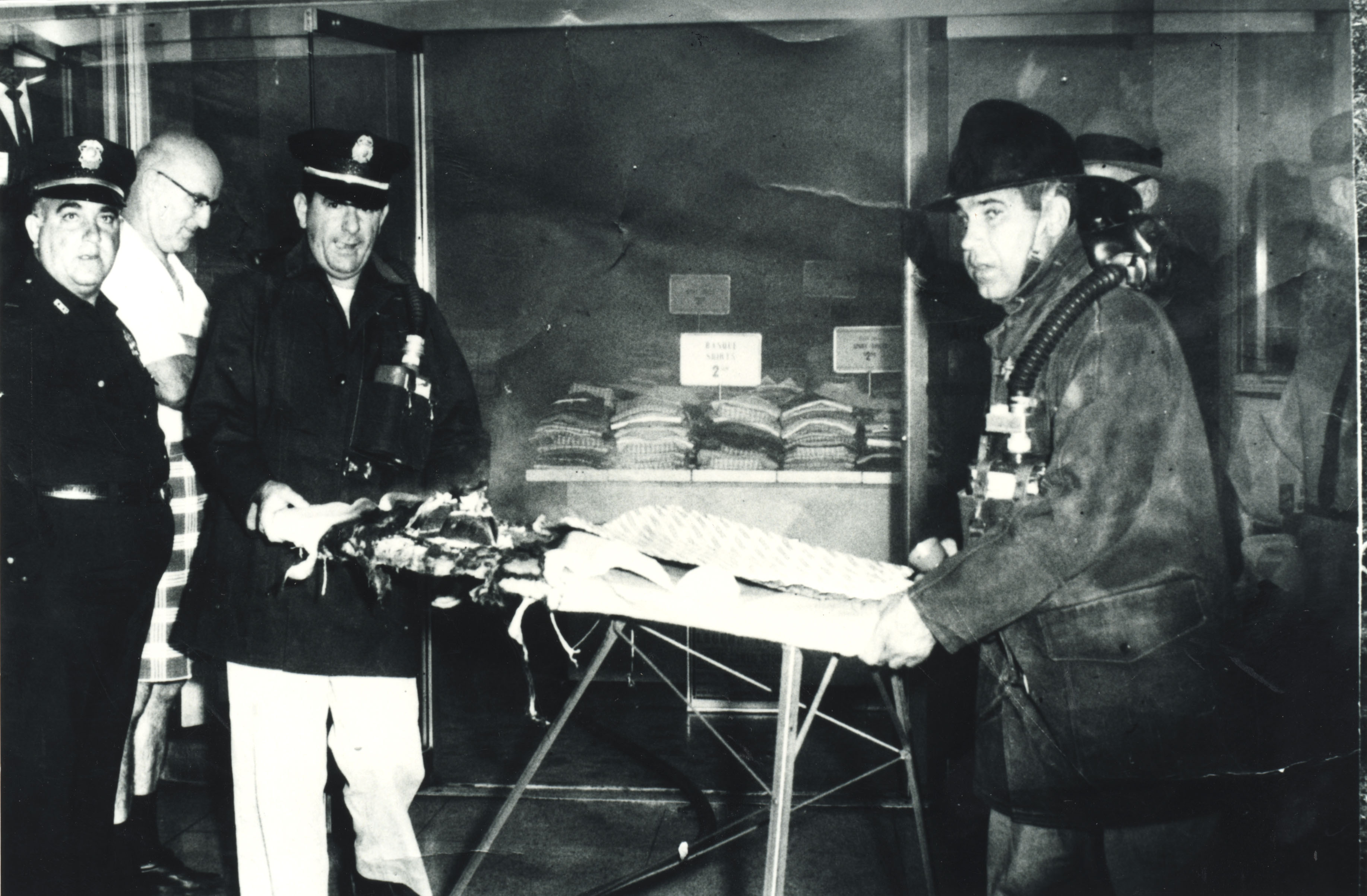
Bum Farto (third from the left) responding to a fire in January 1960

Farto became a fireman in 1942 and worked his way up at the fire station from lieutenant to captain and finally to fire chief in 1964. In a Miami Herald profile, Farto was described as an excessively alert "man of motion" who did not plausibly sit behind desks and for whom being still "just doesn't look natural".

Fire Chief Farto, who also managed a little league baseball team, was well known for his flamboyant style and ostentatious behavior. He was frequently seen smoking large cigars and wearing gold jewelry and rose-tinted glasses. He wore red outfits, typically red suits, to ward off evil spirits, and his home featured red walls and red living room carpet. This preference was attributed to a belief in voodoo, but Farto's friend Charles Felton said Farto was dedicated to the worship of Saint Barbara as part of the Santería religion. Bum Farto drove a lime green Ford Galaxie 500 with mirrored tint, chrome hubcaps, an "El Jefe" vanity plate, and "El Jefe" written on its side. He wore a gold double-headed fire axe pinned to his tie.

In 1968, the Key West Civil Service Board issued him a 30-day suspension from his fire chief role on eight charges, including forging another fireman's signature to cash a $90.73 check (equivalent to $840 in 2025). The Civil Service Board, which was headed by Fire Chief Farto's nephew, attracted controversy when it ultimately did not uphold the suspension. In January 1971, Farto drove into a motorcycle patrolman and was charged for failing to yield to an emergency vehicle. Later that month, he fell into an irrigation canal while on a fire call. Several nearby emergency responders had to rescue him since he could not swim.

== Arrest and conviction ==
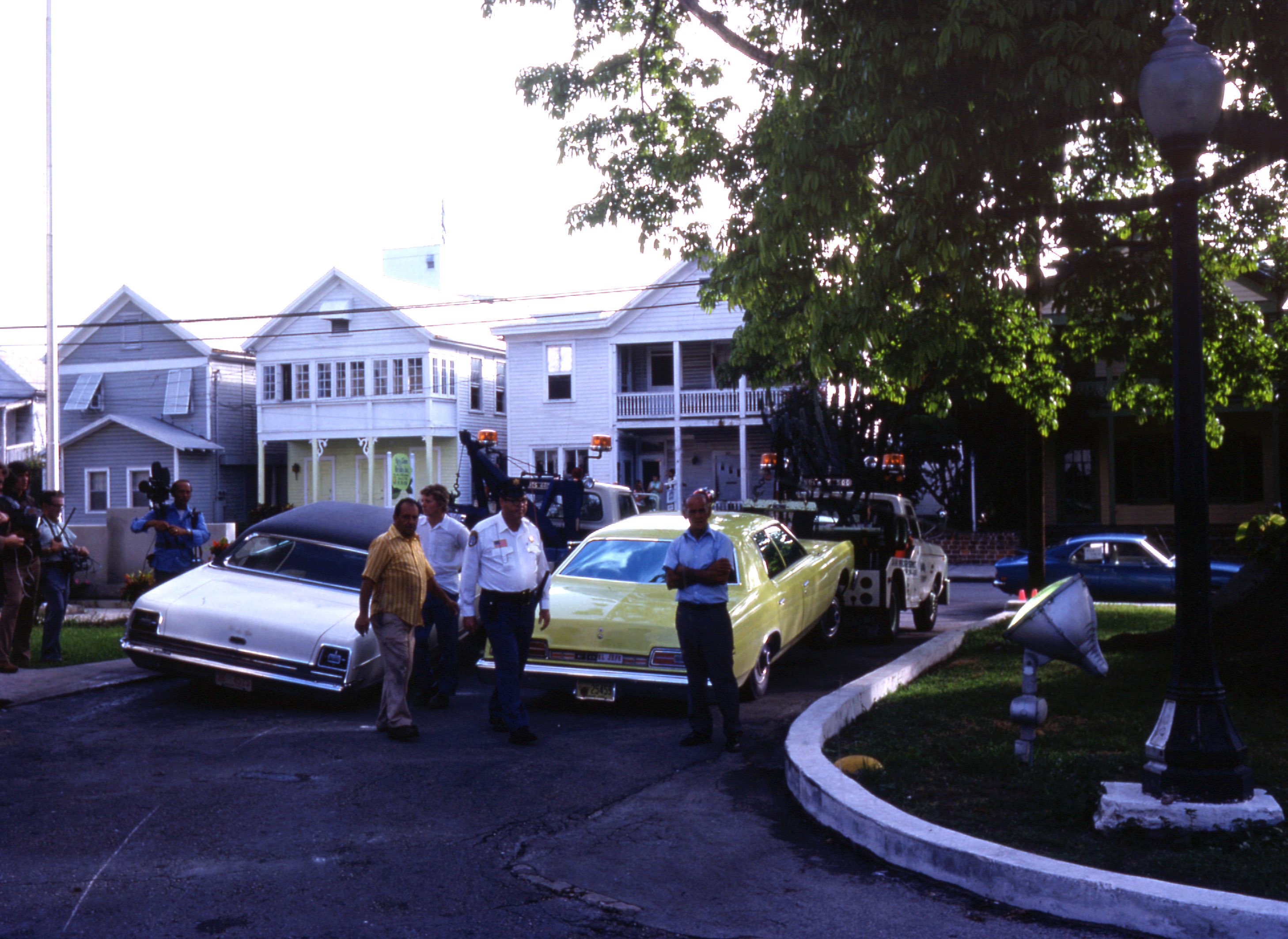
Bum Farto's Ford Galaxie (right) being towed after his arrest

In the 1970s, Florida governor Reubin Askew ordered an investigation into the drug trade in Key West. The U.S. Drug Enforcement Administration, the Florida Department of Law Enforcement, and the Dade County Organized Crime Bureau worked together to formulate Operation Conch, a six-month sting investigation. Titus Walters, an informant, introduced Bum Farto to undercover agent Larry Dollar, who offered Farto a gold diamond ring in exchange for an ounce of cocaine. Farto delayed the transaction, saying that he needed time to source the cocaine. Bum ultimately traded the cocaine to Dollar and was photographed in the act before being arrested on September 9, 1975.

He was the first of twenty-eight drug dealers arrested. He was brought to county jail with fellow narcotics criminal Manny James, the city attorney and son of the police chief. A crowd of 200 gathered to watch, including a wanted heroin dealer whom agents recognized and arrested from the crowd. Farto was convicted in 30 minutes in early February 1976.

== Disappearance and legacy ==
After being convicted of drug trafficking, Farto faced a prison sentence of up to 31 years, but he disappeared before he could be sentenced. On February 16, 1976, he jumped his $25,000 bail (equivalent to $141,447 in 2025) and drove a rented Pontiac LeMans north on U.S. Route 1 out of Key West, at which point he disappeared. Bum Farto was so well-known that when his wanted poster in the police station was torn up by an unknown vandal, the police chief did not replace it because "[e]verybody here knows what he looks like anyway". A Key West shop sold t-shirts with slogans such as "Where is Bum Farto?", "The Answer is Bum's Away", and "What ever happened to El Jefe?"

Due to his drug conviction and the mysterious circumstances of his disappearance, conspiracy theories surrounding Bum Farto's disappearance and fate began to spread rapidly. In 1980, Bum Farto was supposedly sighted at the American embassy in Costa Rica, and six residents of Golfito stated that they recognized him. American musician Jimmy Buffett referenced the theory that Bum Farto was hiding out in Costa Rica in his song "Landfall", in which he said, "Bum's down in Quepos". Farto's attorney, Manny James, reportedly once wore a shirt with the slogan "Bum is Alive and Well in Spain" written on it.

On May 21, 1986, Bum Farto was declared legally dead so that his wife could collect his pension and insurance policies, worth about $5,000 (equivalent to $14,686 in 2025) and $2,000 (equivalent to $5,874 in 2025), respectively. Farto's life story was the subject of a seven-episode podcast titled The Bum Farto Story in 2020 and a musical by Pamela Stephenson called Bum Farto – The Musical in 2021. Farto's desk and uniforms are on display in the Key West Firehouse Museum.

== See also ==
- List of fugitives from justice who disappeared
