= Roberta Leighton (actress) =

American actress (born 1953)

- Born: Roberta Lee Weimar; June 23, 1953 (age 73); Minneapolis, Minnesota, U.S.
- Education: Stephens College
- Occupation: Actress
- Years active: 1976–1998
- Spouse: Corey Young (m. 1988)

Roberta Leighton (born Roberta Lee Weimar; June 23, 1953) is an American actress. She is best known for playing the roles of Dr. Casey Reed on The Young and the Restless (1978 to 1981, return appearances from 1984 to 1998), Shirley Pickett on General Hospital (1983), and Ginger Dawson on Days of Our Lives (1991 to 1992).

== Early life ==
Leighton was born in Minneapolis, Minnesota. She has one sibling, a sister. She studied acting at the Guthrie Theater. She then enrolled at Stephens College in Missouri. She received two Bachelor of Fine Arts degrees, one in acting and the other in writing.

== Career ==
After college, Leighton spent three seasons performing in summer stock. She appeared in stage productions of The Taming of the Shrew, Anything Goes, Sweet Charity, and A Midsummer Night's Dream. Leighton faced a decision about whether to move to New York to continue theater work or move to Los Angeles for film and television roles. She flipped a coin and it landed on heads for Los Angeles, so that was where she went.

Leighton guest starred on The Blue Knight, Baretta, Barnaby Jones, Switch, and Rosetti and Ryan. She made her film debut with an uncredited role in One on One. She played Liza Williams in the 1978 thriller film Barracuda.

In 1978, Leighton joined the cast of the CBS soap opera The Young and the Restless as Dr. Casey Reed. She played the role until 1981. She made return appearances to the show from 1984 to 1998.

Leighton had roles in the films Stripes (1981) and Covergirl (1983). She played Shirley Pickett, a love interest for Luke (Anthony Geary) on the ABC soap opera General Hospital in 1983. She guest starred on an episode of The Dukes of Hazzard in 1984.

From 1991 to 1992, Leighton played Ginger Dawson on the NBC soap opera Days of Our Lives.

== Personal life ==
Leighton had a four-year relationship with her co-star on The Young and the Restless, David Hasselhoff. She also dated Anthony Geary when they worked together on General Hospital.

She met actor Corey Young through their mutual publicist and they began a relationship after he escorted her to a charity ball. They dated for about a year before marrying on August 20, 1988.

In 1991, Leighton underwent surgery to have four malignant tumors removed from her thyroid.

== Filmography ==
=== Film ===
Year	Title	Role	Notes
1977	One on One	Server at Banquet	Uncredited
1978	Barracuda	Liza Williams	
1981	Stripes	Anita	
1983	Covergirl	Dee	

=== Television ===
Year	Title	Role	Notes
1976	The Blue Knight	Cynthia	Episode: "Everything in Life is 3 to 1 Against"
1976–1977, 1979	Barnaby Jones	Jeannie Larkin; Donna Morgan; Vanessa Pickering	3 episodes
1977	Baretta	Cathy	Episode: "Open Season"
1977	Rosetti and Ryan	Druscilla Gerard	Episode: "Men Who Love Women"
1977	Switch	Candy Lewis	Episode: "Net Loss"
1978–1981, 1984–1989, 1998	The Young and the Restless	Casey Reed	Contract role; Guest appearances
1983	General Hospital	Shirley Pickett	Contract role
1984	The Dukes of Hazzard	Candy Dix	Episode: "Play It Again, Luke"
1984	Jessie	Susan Hammer	Episode: "The Long Fuse"
1991–1992	Days of Our Lives	Ginger Dawson	Contract role
