= Charles Dennis =

Canadian actor

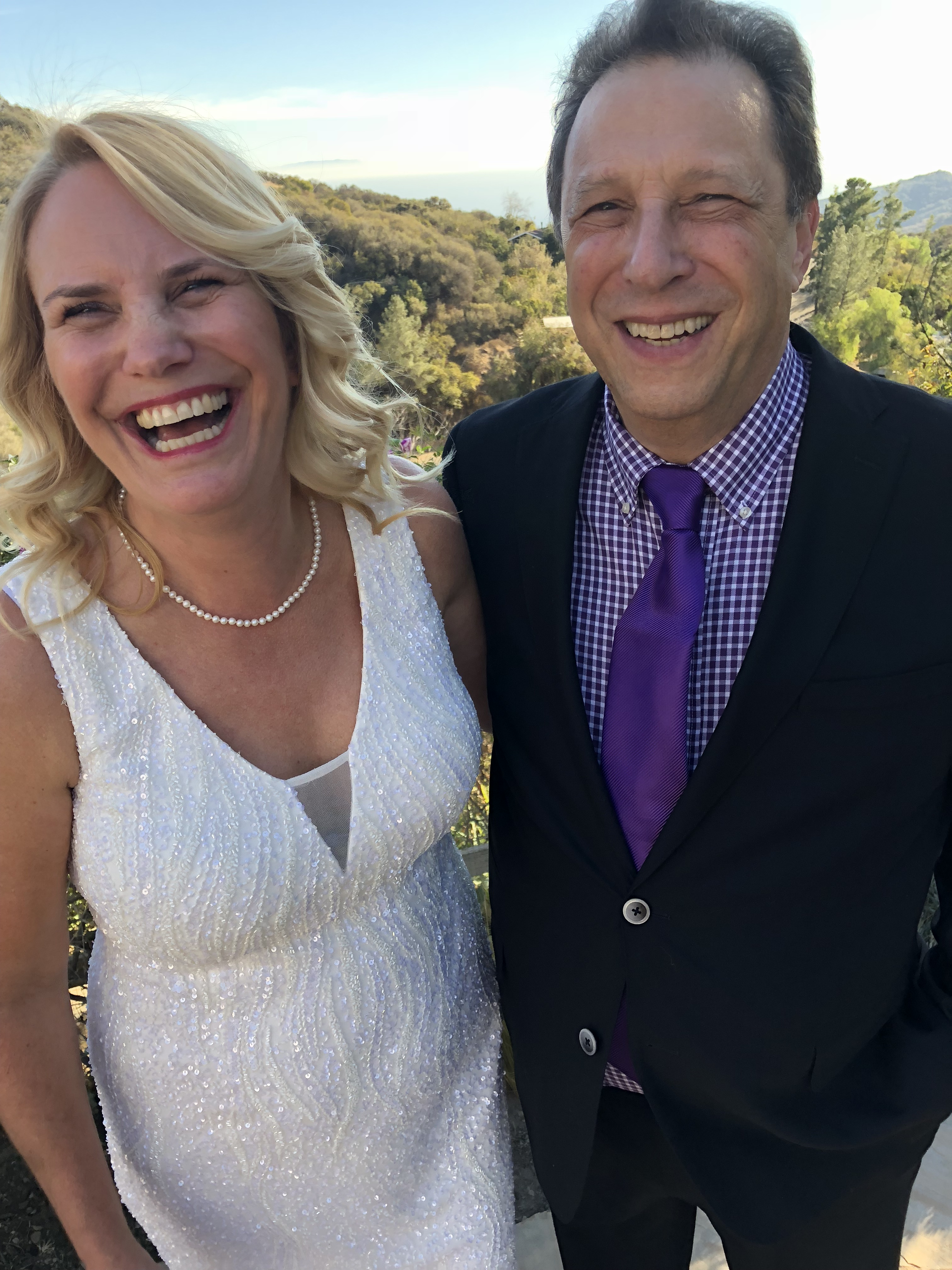
- Ulrika Vingsbo and Dennis at their wedding, December 2017
- Occupations: Author, playwright, filmmaker, journalist, actor, director, and screenwriter
- Notable work: Hollywood Raj, The Magiker, Going On

Charles Dennis is a Canadian actor, playwright, journalist, author, director, and screenwriter.

== Background ==
Dennis is the third son of Sam and Sade Dennis. He attended Cedarvale Public School, Vaughan Road Collegiate, and University College at the University of Toronto, where he graduated with a Bachelor of Arts in 1968. He is on the Great Alumni List for the University of Toronto. He is a member of the Playwrights/Directors Unit of The Actors Studio, and married to producer and publisher Ulrika Vingsbo-Dennis.

He was Artistic Director of the University College Players Guild from 1967 to 1968, and received the McAndrew Award for his contributions to campus drama (which included his own adaptation of Joseph Heller's Catch-22 and the Canadian premiere of Arthur Miller's Incident at Vichy).

== Career ==
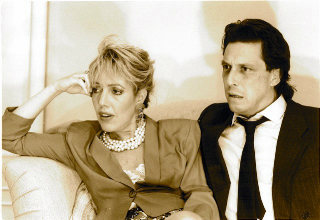
Dennis (right) in Going On.

=== Radio ===
Dennis made his acting debut at 8 years old in 1954 on Marjorie Purvey's radio series Peter and the Dwarf, performing on the series for five years. He has written radio plays for BBC, and CBC, including Leslie and Lajos (CBC) (1982), Long Time Ago (BBC) (1974), and To an Early Grave (BBC) (1972). In 2009 his play, The Alchemist of Cecil Street, starring Ron Orbach, Bryan Cranston and Ed Asner was produced by The Famous Radio Ranch. In 2010 The Famous Radio Ranch followed up with a production of Dennis's play "Tolstoy Was Never There" starring Kevin Dunn, Ross Benjamin, Ron Orbach, Rose Abdoo, Ed Begley, Jr., John O'Hurley, Leila Birch, Kim Eveleth, Becky Bonar. Patrick Pinney and Ethne Bliss.

=== Theatre ===
In 1963, Dennis made his professional stage debut at the Red Barn Theatre in Jackson's Point, Ontario playing Dr. Einstein in Arsenic and Old Lace and Simon Bliss in Hay Fever. Later that year he adapted, directed and played Holden Caulfield in J.D. Salinger's The Catcher in the Rye at the Coach House Theatre in Toronto. While attending the University of Toronto he appeared in Hart House productions of "Heartbreak House", "Ondine", and "The Devils". In 1968, he wrote and appeared in his play, "Everyone Except Mr. Fontana", at the Colonnade Theatre in Toronto. In 1971, he traveled to England, where he directed the Walter Scharf-Don Black- Lionel Chetwynd musical Maybe That's Your Problem at the Roundhouse Theatre in London.

Returning to Canadian stage in 1980, he played Sidney Bruhl in Deathtrap opposite Anna Russell at London's Grand Theatre. His play, Altman's Last Stand, was produced at the National Arts Center in Ottawa in 1982. In 1985, he wrote and directed the play Significant Others at the Beverly Hills Playhouse in Los Angeles.

In 1989, he co-starred with Gwendolyn Humble in his play, Going On, directed by Edward Hardwicke at the Edinburgh Festival Fringe.

In 1990, Dennis recreated the role of Alfred in Going On opposite Maria O'Brien at the Callboard Theatre in Los Angeles, and in 1997 wrote and starred in the play SoHo Duo, directed by Kenneth Welsh at the West Bank Theatre in New York.

In 2003, Dennis created the role of Fred Ross in the Ed Begley, Jr. musical Cesar and Ruben at the El Portal Theater in Los Angeles, and in 2005, played George Sanders in his play High Class Heel, at The National Arts Club in New York.

In 2011, he returned to the boards playing Gregory Wagner for the Open Fist Theater Company in their production of Room Service by Murray and Boretz, which the Los Angeles Times described as a "superb revival". Later that year he played Carlton Fitzgerald opposite Catherine Hicks in Moss Hart's Light Up the Sky at the JRTN in Las Vegas.

In 2016, Dennis revised his play Altman's Last Stand. It was directed by Charles Haid and produced by Racquel Lehrman at the Zephyr Theater in Los Angeles with Michael Laskin as Franz Altman. The production received great critical acclaim.

In 2022, Dennis rewrote Altman's Last Stand and retitled it King Solomon's Treasure. He also added a second character, Miss Carmichael, a writer for People Magazine. Dennis played the role of Franz Altman and Stevie Jean Placek played Miss Carmichael. The play was produced by Ulrika Vingsbo and presented at the Whitefire Theatre in Sharman Oaks, California. The play was filmed during its six weeks run. The film had its world premiere later in the year at the Studio City Film Festival and Dennis won the award for Best Actor in a Feature Film.

==== Plays ====
- 2022 King Solomon's Treasure (author/actor)
- 2016 Altman's Last Stand (author)
- 2005, High Class Heel (author/actor)
- 1997, SoHo Duo (author/actor)
- 1989, Going On (author/actor)
- 1985, Significant Others (author/director)
- 1982, Altman's Last Stand (author)
- 1974, Crazy Joan (book/lyrics)
- 1968, Everyone Except Mr. Fontana (author/actor)

=== Journalism ===
Author George Anthony wrote that Charles Dennis "was a talented young hotshot who wanted to do it all: write, produce, direct, star", and that he "worked as an entertainment writer for Toronto Telegram". He was a film and theatre critic for them until his first play, Everyone Except Mr. Fontana presented in 1968.

In 2002, Dennis wrote three articles for the Calendar section of the Los Angeles Times about Ivor Novello, Phil Gersh, and Julian Fellowes. In February 2010 he wrote an article on Christopher Plummer in The Hollywood Reporter.

== Author ==
His first novel, Stoned Cold Soldier was published in 1973. In 1997 (using the pseudonym Margaret Barrett), Dennis wrote the novels Given the Crime and Given the Evidence. His works have received favorable response from Kirkus Reviews. His latest novel, Hollywood Raj, was published by Vingsbo Press in February 2018.

In 2022, Dennis's first non-fiction book, "There's a Body in the Window Seat", was published by Applause Books. A passion project of Dennis's, the book is a history of Arsenic and Old Lace, both the play and the movie.

In 2023, Vingsbo Press published his 14th novel, "Balm of Angels". In 2026, his first volume of memoirs, "Who the Hell is Charles Dennis?" was published by Stir Media Publishing.

=== Bibliography ===
- 2026. "Who the Hell is Charles Dennis?" ISBN 979-8-172-55504-6
- 2023, "Balm of Angels" ISBN 978-0-9997683-2-7
- 2022, "There's a Body in the Window Seat" ISBN 978-1-4930-6785-5
- 2018, "Hollywood Raj" ISBN 978-0-9997683-0-3
- 2013, "The Magiker" ISBN 978-1-940412-02-3
- 1998, Given the Evidence ISBN 0-671-00153-1
- 1998, Given the Crime ISBN 0-671-00151-5
- 1987, Shar-Li ISBN 0-515-08974-5
- 1981, The Dealmakers ISBN 0-440-11852-2
- 1979, Bonfire ISBN 0-440-10659-1
- 1978, The Periwinkle Assault ISBN 0-7701-0027-9
- 1977, A Divine Case of Murder ISBN 0-7701-0050-3
- 1975, This War Is Closed Until Spring ISBN 0-8600-71812
- 1975, Somebody Just Grabbed Annie! ISBN 0-312-74375-0
- 1974, The Next-to-Last Train Ride ISBN 0-312-57225-5
- 1973, Stoned Cold Soldier ISBN 0-86007-019-0

=== Television, film, and video ===
In 1969 while living in London, Dennis adapted his play, Aztecs and Orange Juice, for ATV and appeared in it opposite Derek Fowlds and Cheryl Kennedy. In 1973, he created Thames Television's first daytime drama, Marked Personal starring Stephanie Beacham. He wrote the Television movies Mirror, Mirror in 1979 and The Jayne Mansfield Story in 1980. He wrote and appeared in the 1984 film Covergirl opposite Kenneth Welsh, William Hutt and August Schellenberg. In 1984, he wrote and directed the film Reno and the Doc starring Kenneth Welsh and Linda Griffiths, which in 1985 was nominated for four Genie Awards. Also in 1984 he co-authored a screenplay of his novel The Next-to-Last Train Ride for a film which was directed by Richard Lester and released under the title Finders Keepers. Vincent Canby in The New York Times described it as "a genially oddball comedy of a sort not often successfully made these days."

In 2004, Dennis was the voice of Rico in Disney's animated feature Home on the Range. In 2007, Dennis wrote and directed the motion picture Hard Four starring Ross Benjamin, Samuel Gould, Ed Asner, Dabney Coleman, Paula Prentiss, Ed Begley, Jr., Fayard Nicholas and Bryan Cranston. In 2010 he wrote and directed The Favour of Your Company starring Carolyn Seymour, Neil Dickson and Ron Orbach, which was shown at the BAFTA/LA Short Film Showcase.

In 2011 he launched his own online interview show Paid to Dream, which can be read and heard at www.paidtodream.com.

In October, 2011 he won the first-ever Samuel Fuller Guerilla Filmmaker Award at the Buffalo International Film Festival for his short film Atwill starring Neil Dickson and Brent Huff. It was also an Official Selection of The Buffalo Film Festival in the same year. The film was shot entirely on an iPad and edited on iMovie.

In 2012, he began production on his first iPad feature, Chicanery featuring Brent Huff, Patty McCormack, Kenneth Welsh, Kate Vernon, Fred Melamed, Elya Baskin, Rose Abdoo, Ron Orbach, Ross Benjamin, Patrick Pinney and Mark Rydell. Film was completed in 2015 and won the Innovation Award at the first Durham Region Film Festival in Oshawa, Canada.

A web series based on the prize-winning film Atwill debuted on YouTube in 2014 with Neil Dickson returning as Atwill, and Michael Swan joining the cast as Nelson. Brent Huff returned in several episodes as Atwill's nemesis Kobalt. The first season consisted of ten episodes, and series guest stars included Patty McCormack, Rick Podell, Kim Delgado, Lou Wagner, Patrick Pinney, and Nicole Ansari.

In 2017, Atwill became a TV series called Atwill at Large with Dickson and Swan continuing their roles as Atwill and Nelson. Guest stars included Michael Lindsay-Hogg, Fred Melamed, and Mauricio Mendoza. It played on YouTube for five episodes.

In July 2017 he returned to Canada to shoot the film Shortly to Go, starring Colin Fox and Kenneth Welsh. The film was shot on location in Elora, Ontario and later involved shooting in Studio City, California with Patty McCormack. Written, produced and directed by Dennis, the executive producer was Ulrika Vingsbo, who was also the film's editor.

In 2018, Dennis wrote and directed the film, Barking Mad, which starred Neil Dickson, Michael Swan, Patty McCormack, Edward Asner, Loren Lester, Mary Stavin, and Fred Melamed. It was produced for Foo Dog Films by Ulrika Vingsbo. The film was shot entirely on an iPad. The movie won an award for Best Ensemble Cast at the 2021 Studio City Film Festival.

In 2022, Dennis wrote and directed the feature film "Deadly Draw", which starred Brent Huff, Ulrika Vingsbo, Jack Maxwell, Fred Melamed, Gail O'Grady, Jeffrey Byron, Patty McCormack and Ed Asner (in his final screen appearance). Ulrika Vingsbo won for Best Actress at the 2023 Vegas Film Awards and Fred Melamed won for Best Supporting Actor. The film also won for Best Comedy feature at the 2023 Tarzana International Film Festival.

In 2025, Dennis revived "Paid to Dream" as a podcast streaming on YouTube. His guests have included Elliott Gould, Bryan Cranston, Brian Cox, Ed Begley Jr, Laila Robins, Corbin Bernsen, Rosie Shuster, Spencer Garrett, Rick Podell, Loren Lester, Mardi and Joe Goodman, and Teresa Ganzel.

== Filmography ==
=== As writer or director ===
- Marked Personal (90 episodes, 1973–1974) (TV)
- The Thirsty Dead (1974)
- Search and Rescue: The Alpha Team (1977) (TV)
- Mirror, Mirror (1979) writer
- The Jayne Mansfield Story (1980) (writer)
- Double Negative (1980)
- Svengali (1983) (TV)
- Covergirl (1984) (writer)
- Reno and the Doc (1984) (writer/director)
- Loose Ends (1984) (writer)
- Finders Keepers (1984) (based on his novel The Next-to-Last Train Ride)
- Adderly (1 episode, 1986) (TV)
- Goose on the Loose (2006) (writer)
- Hard Four (2007) (writer/director/producer)
- Butterfield (2008) (writer)
- Chicanery (2015) (writer/director/producer)
- Atwill at Large (2017) (writer/director/producer)
- Shortly to Go (2017) (writer/director/producer)
- Barking Mad (2018) (writer/director/producer)
- Deadly Draw (2023) (writer/director)

=== As actor ===
| Year | Title | Role | Notes |
|---|---|---|---|
| 1984 | Reno and the Doc | Delgado | |
| 1984 | Covergirl | Craig Blitzstein | |
| 1986 | Loose Ends | Lods Kukoff | |
| 1990 | Star Trek: The Next Generation | Commander Sunad | Episode: "Transfigurations" |
| 1990 | Grand Slam | Lieutenant Franco | Episode: "Who's Crazy?" |
| 1991 | Princesses | Charles Hawkenberry | Episode: "The Slob Who Came to Dinner" |
| 1991 | Jake and the Fatman | Guterman | Episode: "You Don't Know Me" |
| 1993 | Relentless 3 | Detective Cirrillo | |
| 1998 | Due South | Marcel | Episode: "Good for the Soul" |
| 2001 | 2001: A Space Travesty | Flashback Doctor | |
| 2002 | Star Trek: Enterprise | Chancellor Trelit | Episode: "Desert Crossing" |
| 2004 | Home on the Range | Rico (voice) | |
| 2007 | Hard Four | Pericles Kulakundis | |
| 2008 | Butterfield | Steve Butterfield | |
| 2008 | Donna on Demand | Charlie | |
| 2009-2014 | American Dad! | Michael, Carnival Barker, Captain Lefebvre, Rabbi (voice) | |
| 2015 | The Donkey | Jamison Haley | |
| 2017 | Atwill at Large | Jack Tarragon | |
| 2018 | Barking Mad | Jack Tarragon | |
| 2023 | Deadly Draw | Stavros Makos | |

=== Video games ===
| Year | Title | Role | Notes |
|---|---|---|---|
| 2002 | Star Wars: The Clone Wars | Ulic Qel-Droma | |
| 2003 | Star Wars: Knights of the Old Republic | Davik Kang | |
| 2003 | Crimson Skies: High Road to Revenge | Dr. Nicholas von Essen, Eddie, Bandit | |
| 2003 | Brute Force | Shadoon | |
| 2004 | Ninja Gaiden | Doku | English Dub |
| 2004 | Ground Control II: Operation Exodus | Major D. Grant, Unit Feedback | |
| 2004 | Doom 3 | Counselor Elliot Swann | |
| 2004 | The Bard's Tale | Fionnaoch | |
| 2004 | Star Wars Knights of the Old Republic II: The Sith Lords | Lieutenant Dol Grenn, Zherron | |
| 2004 | EverQuest II | Various characters | |
| 2005 | Crash Tag Team Racing | Park Drone | |
| 2005 | Mercenaries: Playground of Destruction | Josef Yurinov | |
| 2009 | Red Faction: Guerrilla | Admiral Kobel | |
| 2011 | Call of Juarez: The Cartel | Baressi | |
| 2011 | The Elder Scrolls V: Skyrim | Odahviing | |
| 2013 | Star Trek | Surok | |

== Awards and nominations ==
- 2023 Tarzana International Film Festival Best Feature Comedy Winner "Deadly Draw"
- 2021 Studio City Film Festival Best Ensemble Cast Winner "Barking Mad"
- 2022 Studio City Film Festival Best Actor Winner "King Solomon's Treasure"
- 2017 Riverside International Film Festival Innovation in Cinema for "Chicanery"
- 2015 Innovation Award at the Durham Region Film Festival in Oshawa, Canada for "Chicanery"
- 2011 Samuel Fuller Guerilla Filmmaker Award, Buffalo International Film Festival (BIFF:Buffalo) "Atwill". Official Selection BIFF:Buffalo 2011.
- 1989 Daily Express Award Best New Play Going On (nominated)
- 1985 Nomination, Genie Award for Best Song: "A Little Piece of Forever" from Reno and the Doc
- 1968 McAndrew Award University of Toronto (winner)
