= Peter Reynolds (actor) =

English actor (1921–1975)

- Born: Peter Gordon Horrocks; 16 August 1921; Wilmslow, Cheshire, England
- Died: 22 April 1975 (aged 53); Sydney, Australia
- Occupation: Actor
- Years active: 1948–1975

Peter Reynolds (born Peter Gordon Horrocks; 16 August 1921 – 22 April 1975) was an English actor.

== Career ==
Most of his career was spent in B films, as "the archetypal spiv, unreliable boyfriend, unscrupulous blackmailer, the smoothie ever ready to light a lady's cigarette". Filmink reflected "few actors of his generation made movies more fun." An example is his starring role as a fundamentally decent but corruptible business man in the classic heist film The Breaking Point (1961 film).

He starred in two early films for John Guillermin. He played Hilaire in episode 28 of The Adventures of William Tell, The Avenger (1959).

He appeared in The Avengers as Al Brady in "Double Danger" in 1961 and as Tulip in "Who's Who" in 1967. In 1968 he appeared in "The Man in the Elegant Room" episode of the spy-fi series Department S

In 1969 Reynolds moved to Australia, where his career gained a second wind. He appeared in over two dozen roles in his first six years there (1969 to 1974, inclusive), mainly on TV. Amongst his appearances was a leading role in the black comedy film Private Collection (1972). He also appeared in Woodbine cigarette commercials. He lived alone, apart from his little dog, in Sydney; his brother lived in the same city.

== Death ==
He and his dog died in a fire in his flat in Oxford Street, Paddington, Sydney, on 22 April 1975. The fire was caused by Reynolds smoking in bed.

== Selected filmography ==
- There Is No Escape (1948)
- The Guinea Pig (1948) - Grimmett
- Things Happen at Night (1948)
- Adam and Evelyne (1949) - David
- Guilt Is My Shadow (1950) - Jamie
- Smart Alec (1951) - Alec Albion
- Four Days (1951) - Johnny Keylin
- The Magic Box (1951) - Bridegroom in Wedding Group
- The Last Page (1952) - Jeffrey Hart
- The Woman's Angle (1952) - Brian Mansell
- 24 Hours of a Woman's Life (1952) - Peter
- I Vinti (1953) - Aubrey
- The Robe (1953) - Lucius (uncredited)
- The Good Beginning (1953) - Brian Watson
- Black 13 (1953) - Stephen
- Devil Girl from Mars (1954) - Robert Justin, alias Albert Simpson
- One Just Man (1954) - Playboy
- Destination Milan (1954)
- The Delavine Affair (1955) - Rex Banner
- Born for Trouble (1955)
- You Can't Escape (1956) - Rodney Nixon
- The Long Haul (1957) - Frank
- The Bank Raiders (1958) - Terry Milligan
- Shake Hands with the Devil (1959) - Captain 'Black & Tans'
- Wrong Number (1959) - Angelo
- Dial 999 (TV series) (1959) - ('Rolling Racketeers', episode) - Tyler
- Your Money or Your Wife (1960) - Theodore Malek
- The Challenge (1960) - Buddy
- The Hands of Orlac (1960) - Mr. Felix
- The Breaking Point (1961) - Eric Winlatter
- Man Who Couldn't Walk (1961) - Keefe Brand
- Highway to Battle (1961) - Jarvost
- Spare the Rod (1961) - Alec Murray
- A Question of Suspense (1961) - Tellman Drew
- Gaolbreak (1962) - Eddie Wallis
- The Painted Smile (1962) - Mark
- West 11 (1963) - Jacko
- Daleks' Invasion Earth 2150 A.D. (1966) - Man on Bicycle
- Department S (1968)- Steven Radlett
- Private Collection (1972) - Henry-Adrian Phillips
