= The Man Who Couldn't Walk =

Man Who Couldn't Walk
- Directed by: Henry Cass
- Screenplay by: Umesh Malik
- Produced by: Jock Macgregor; Umesh Malik
- Starring: Eric Pohlmann; Peter Reynolds
- Distributed by: Butcher Film Distributors
- Release date: 17 October 1960
- Running time: 65 mins
- Country: United Kingdom
- Language: English

The Man Who Couldn't Walk is a 1960 British film directed by Henry Cass and starring Eric Pohlmann and Peter Reynolds. The screenplay was by Umesh Malik.

It was one of several British crime films starring Reynolds.

== Premise ==
A gang of jewel thieves led by a man in a wheelchair hire a top safecracker.

== Cast ==
- Eric Pohlmann as The Consul General
- Peter Reynolds as Keefe Brand
- Pat Clavin as Carol
- Reed De Rouen as Luigi
- Bernadette Milnes as Cora
- Richard Shaw as Enrico
- Martin Cass as Beppo
- Margot Van der Burgh as Maria
- Maurice Bannister as Joey
- Martin Gordon as Lou
- Endre Muller as Johnny
- Owen Berry as 1st watchman
- John Baker as 2nd watchman

== Production ==
Filming started on 11 January 1960 at Walton Studios.

== Reception ==
The Monthly Film Bulletin wrote: "This unexceptional thriller has a tortuous and unlikely plot, ... a slick American idiom at variance with the London setting ... and a tendency to romanticise its unpleasant characters. It creates the general impression of being a rehash of incidents from the innumerable safe-breaking, bank or jewel robbery films of the last year or so."

Kine Weekly wrote the film "packs quite a punch for its size... a reliable quota second."

Variety said the film "comptently fulfils its mission." When film was released in the US in 1964 Variety reviewed the movie again, calling it "routine but adequate".
