= Covergirl (film) =

1984 film by Jean-Claude Lord

- Directed by: Jean-Claude Lord
- Written by: Charles Dennis
- Produced by: Claude Héroux
- Starring: Jeff Conaway; Irena Ferris; Cathie Shirriff; Roberta Leighton; Deborah Wakeham; Kenneth Welsh; Charles Dennis; William Hutt; Philip Akin; Tiiu Leek; August Schellenberg
- Cinematography: René Verzier
- Edited by: Christopher Holmes
- Music by: Christopher L. Stone
- Distributed by: New World Pictures
- Release date: 2 March 1984
- Running time: 93 min.
- Country: Canada
- Language: English

Covergirl is a 1984 Canadian drama film directed by Jean-Claude Lord. This film contains music composed by Christopher L. Stone. The film stars Jeff Conaway, Irena Ferris, Cathie Shirriff, Roberta Leighton, Deborah Wakeham and Kenneth Welsh in the lead roles.

== Plot ==
The film focuses on a millionaire who meets an aspiring model. After fulfilling his need to get her in bed with him, he is still dissatisfied and decides to take on a managerial role in her career.

== Cast ==
- Jeff Conaway
- Irena Ferris
- Cathie Shirriff
- Roberta Leighton
- Deborah Wakeham
- Kenneth Welsh
- Charles Dennis
- William Hutt
- Philip Akin
- Tiiu Leek
- August Schellenberg
