= Barracuda (1977 film) =

- Theatrical release poster
- Directed by: Harry Kerwin; Wayne Crawford – (underwater scenes)
- Written by: Harry Kerwin – (story and screenplay); Wayne Crawford – (story and screenplay)
- Produced by: Wayne Crawford; Harry Kerwin
- Starring: Wayne Crawford; Jason Evers; Roberta Leighton; Cliff Emmich; William Kerwin; Bert Freed
- Cinematography: Edmund Gibson (as H. Edmund Gibson)
- Edited by: Jane McCulley
- Music by: Klaus Schulze
- Distributed by: Republic Pictures (II)
- Release date: September 16, 1977
- Running time: 98 minutes
- Country: United States
- Language: English

Barracuda is a 1977 American horror/thriller film about a small Florida coastal town that is menaced by chemically induced and highly aggressive barracuda fish. The cast included Wayne Crawford, Jason Evers, Roberta Leighton, Cliff Emmich, William Kerwin and Bert Freed. It was directed by Harry Kerwin, with the underwater sequences handled by Wayne Crawford.

== Plot ==
A top secret government experiment leads to fatal barracuda attacks on the beaches of a small coastal town formerly renowned for its lobster. A marine biologist (Wayne Crawford) and sheriff (William Kerwin) uncover a plot involving a mentally unstable former war-medic (Evers) pioneering research into hypoglycemia and its effects on human behavior.

== Cast ==
- Wayne Crawford – Mike Canfield (credited as Wayne David Crawford)
- Jason Evers – Dr. Elliot Snow
- Roberta Leighton – Liza Williams
- Cliff Emmich – Deputy Lester
- William Kerwin – Sheriff Ben Williams
- Bert Freed – Papa Jack
- Harry Kerwin – Government Agent #1
- Rick Rhodes – Government Agent #2
- Matt King – Agent Leaving
- Barbara Keegan – Maggie Snow (credited as Bobbie Ellyne Kosstrin)
- Edmund Lupinski – Boy on Beach (credited as Ed Lupinski)
- Kim Nichols – Girl on Beach
- Frank Logan – Sam
- Daniel L. Fitzgerald – Cook
- Will Knickerbocker – Bill (credited as Willis Knickerbocker)
- Ruth Miller – Edna
- Scott Avery – Toby
- Bob J. Shields – Floyd

== Release ==
=== Home media ===
Barracuda was released on VHS by UAV Corporation on December 7, 1989. The film was released on DVD by Dark Sky Films on September 30, 2008.

== Reception ==
Cavett Binion from Allmovie gave the film a negative review, called it "[a] muddled attempt at ecological horror". Andrew Smith from Popcorn Pictures awarded the film a score of 2/10, calling it "a cheap cash-in", and criticized the film's plot, phony special effects, and lack of focus on the film's title monsters.
