= The Delavine Affair =

1955 British film by Douglas Peirce

- Directed by: Douglas Peirce
- Screenplay by: George Fisher; Basil Boothroyd
- Based on: Winter Wears a Shroud by Robert Chapman
- Produced by: John Croydon; Henry Passmore
- Starring: Peter Reynolds; Honor Blackman; Gordon Jackson
- Cinematography: Jonah Jones
- Edited by: Inman Hunter
- Production company: Croydon Passmore Productions
- Distributed by: Monarch Film Corporation
- Release date: 3 January 1955
- Running time: 64 minutes
- Country: United Kingdom
- Language: English

The Delavine Affair is a 1955 British second feature crime film directed by Douglas Peirce and starring Peter Reynolds, Honor Blackman and Gordon Jackson. The screenplay was by George Fisher and Basil Boothroyd, based on the 1952 novel Winter Wears a Shroud by Robert Chapman.

== Plot ==
Journalist Rex Banner finds his friend Gospel Joe murdered. In the corpse's hand is a newspaper cutting about a jewel robbery. When Banner realises he is being framed for the murder, with the aid of his wife he sets out to find the real murderer and at the same time get a good story. He tracks down the criminals, recovers the stolen jewels, and unmasks Joe's killer.

== Cast ==
- Peter Reynolds as Rex Banner
- Honor Blackman as Maxine Banner
- Gordon Jackson as Florian
- Valerie Vernon as Lola
- Michael Balfour as Sammy
- Peter Neil as Inspector Johnson
- Peter Swanwick as Meyerling
- Laurie Main as Summit
- Katie Johnson as Mrs. Bissett
- Mark Daly as Mr. Bissett
- Anna Turner as Mrs Halloran
- Mai Bacon as Fanny
- Hal Osmond as old man
- Vernon Kelso as Macgregor
- Christie Humphrey as maid

== Production ==
The film was produced at Walton Studios and on location in West London, including Kensington and West Brompton. Sets were designed by the art director John Stoll.

== Critical reception ==
Monthly Film Bulletin said: "A murder comedy-melodrama on familiar lines. The story is seldom very plausible, coincidence reaches out with a long arm, and the developments and the solution have their vague aspects. The film, though, is reasonably bright in tone, and the playing of the principals to some extent makes up in enthusiasm for what it lacks in polish."

Kine Weekly wrote: "There is slightly more talk than action, but the interplay of sharply etched characters is lively, and what thrills there are are accurately timed. Up-to-scratch dialogue, staging and photography provide the finishing touches. ...The picture, although a modest affair, wants a bit of following but constantly changing backgrounds cunningly stimulate interest. Peter Reynolds gets a break from psychiatric roles and makes the most of his chances as Rex, Honor Blackman displays spirit as Maxine, and Gordon Jackson registers as villain Florian. The support, too, is sound and the same goes for the direction. Despite a few untidy early rounds, or rather reels, the film ends as it should with a knock-out."

Picturegoer wrote: "The story is rough-hewn, but there's polish and precision in the action and dialogue. You can get comfortable with the characters – especially with the debonair ease of Peter Reynolds and the cool charm of Honor Blackman, as his puzzled wife. Well-paced thriller."

Picture Show wrote: "Crisp, neat account of a reporter's efforts fo solve a murder, clear his name and find the proceeds of a jewel robbery. It has witty dialogue and is well acted and directed."

In British Sound Films: The Studio Years 1928–1959 David Quinlan rated the film as "average", writing: "Witty comedy-thriller with over-familiar plot but polished performances."

Filmink called Reynolds, best known for villains, "a boringly ordinary hero" in this film.

TV Guide gave the film two out of five stars, noting a "Routine crime drama."
