= Cliff Emmich =

American actor (1936–2022)

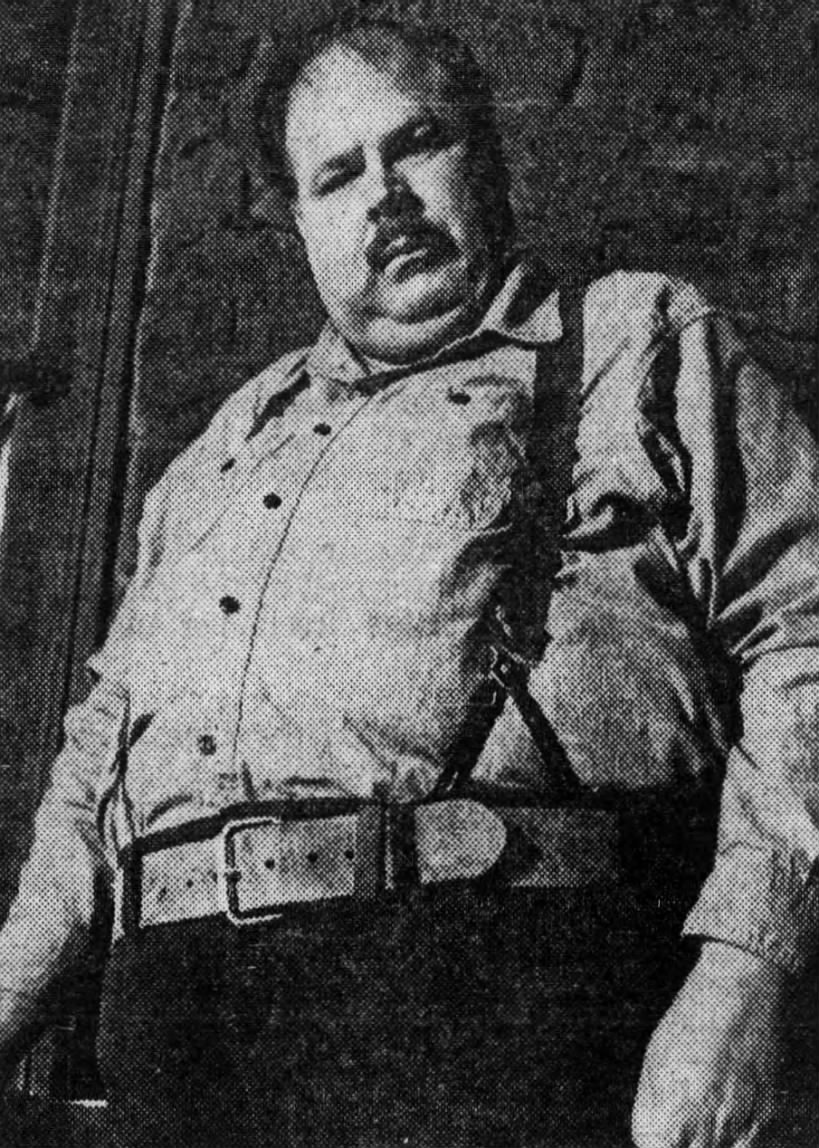
- Emmich in 1978
- Born: Clifford Joseph Emmich; December 13, 1936; Cincinnati, Ohio, U.S.
- Died: November 28, 2022 (aged 85); Los Angeles, California, U.S.
- Occupations: Film, stage and television actor

Clifford Joseph Emmich (December 13, 1936 – November 28, 2022) was an American film, stage and television actor. He was best known for playing Chicago, the driver in the 1973 film Payday.

== Life and career ==
Clifford Joseph Emmich was born on December 13, 1936, in Cincinnati, Ohio, the son of Clifford Emmich Sr. He attended John Muir High School, graduating in 1955. After graduating, he joined the United States Air Force as a photo technician during the Korean War. He began his stage career in the 1960s, when he was a student at the Pasadena Playhouse. During his stage career, he acted summer stock theaters, such as the Pink Garter Theatre, where he played Molly's Father in the stage play I Ain't Down Yet in Jackson, Wyoming. He toured 153 cities in 23 states with the American Repertory Players.

Emmich began his screen career in 1969, playing an uncredited role in the film Gaily, Gaily. He guest-starred in numerous television programs including The Odd Couple, Ironside, Trapper John, M.D., 227, Murder, She Wrote, Happy Days, Mary Hartman, Mary Hartman, CHiPs, Starsky and Hutch, Fantasy Island, Who's the Boss?, Charlie's Angels, Columbo, Night Court, Walker, Texas Ranger, Knots Landing, Police Woman and Baywatch. In 1973, he starred as Chicago, the driver in the film Payday, He also appeared in numerous films such as Invasion of the Bee Girls, Thunderbolt and Lightfoot, Rafferty and the Gold Dust Twins, Aloha Bobby and Rose, Bad Georgia Road, Stingray, Barracuda, Halloween II, Hellhole, Return to Horror High, Mouse Hunt and Inspector Gadget. During his screen career, in 1978, when he guest-starred in the NBC historical drama television series Little House on the Prairie, he stated that "there was nothing even funny about being fat".

Emmich retired from acting in 2013, last appearing in the television film Holiday Road Trip. Aside from acting, he spent most of his life on a healthy diet, which he later abandoned.

== Death ==
Emmich died on November 28, 2022 of lung cancer, at his home in the Valley Village neighborhood of Los Angeles, California, at the age of 85.
