= Going On (play) =

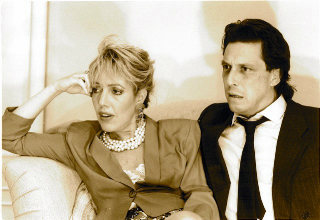
Maria O'Brien as Lynn and Charles Dennis as Alfred.

Going On is a comedy play by Charles Dennis, set in a dressing room of a Broadway theatre.

== Plot ==
The play concerns the relationship between two understudies waiting backstage during the run of a Broadway hit and hoping for their chance to go on. The characters are called Alfred and Lynn, a tribute to the legendary Lunts and the long-vanished theater they represented.

== Debut and award nomination ==
The play was originally produced at the Edinburgh Fringe Festival in 1989 and starred Charles Dennis as Alfred and Gwendolyn Humble as Lynn. It was nominated for the Daily Express Award for best new play.

== Reception ==
The Guardian wrote: "Robust dialogue and carefully managed shifts of mood between the comic and the sad have you constantly uncertain whether to laugh or cry." The Scotsman wrote: "It's funny, moving and intelligent but, most of all, a celebration of what it means to be cursed by a thespian calling." In 1990 Dennis played Alfred again opposite Maria O'Brien's Lynn at the Callboard Theatre in Los Angeles. In 1991, the celebrated critic Sheridan Morley wrote about a British touring production featuring Giselle Wolf as Lynn and Tim Earle as Alfred in the International Herald Tribune: "Let us cheer the arrival at the Latchmere in Battersea of Charles Dennis's Going On... It's a love story about two latter-day Broadway understudies, torn between a fervent desire to get onstage and a deep terror that they may suddenly be called on to do so. But 'Going On' does not only mean going on stage: It also means going on with lives that seem often hopelessly bereft of love or purpose or success. The major triumph of Dennis has been to write a very conventional odd-couple love story within the unconventional frame of understudy lives. These people are forever imitating their Hollywood and Broadway betters, because that is what they are paid to do. They also live, like Stoppard's Rosencrantz and Guildenstern, on the fringes of reality until they are suddenly thrown into the blazing lights, albeit as unprepared and under-rehearsed for their show as they are for their own awakening feelings of love. Having made self-absorption into an art form, having lived within the conventions of a horror movie where parents crucify themselves on satellite dishes, they lurch from Ibsen and Strindberg into Coward and Shaffer stereotypes, all the while waiting for the prompter to come to the rescue." Dennis later played Alfred opposite Lane Binkley's Lynn at The National Arts Club in New York City in 1997. The play was performed again in 2011 at the Pensacola Shakespeare Theatre in Pensacola, Florida with Geraint Wyn Davies as Alfred and Claire Lautier as Lynn.
