= Finders Keepers (1984 film) =

1984 film by Richard Lester

- Theatrical release poster by Mort Drucker
- Directed by: Richard Lester
- Written by: Charles Dennis; Ronny Graham; Terence Marsh
- Based on: The Next-to-Last Train Ride by Charles Dennis
- Produced by: Sandra Marsh; Terence Marsh
- Starring: Michael O'Keefe; Beverly D'Angelo; David Wayne; Ed Lauter; Brian Dennehy; Pamela Stephenson; Louis Gossett Jr.
- Cinematography: Brian West
- Music by: Ken Thorne
- Production company: CBS Theatrical Films
- Distributed by: Warner Bros. Pictures
- Release date: May 18, 1984
- Running time: 96 min.
- Language: English
- Budget: $7 million
- Box office: $1.4 million

Finders Keepers is a 1984 American comedy film directed by Richard Lester, and starring Michael O'Keefe, Beverly D'Angelo, Brian Dennehy, Louis Gossett Jr. and Jim Carrey. It was adapted from Charles Dennis' 1974 novel The Next-to-Last Train Ride. The film opened on May 18, 1984, earning $865,207 during its first weekend in 753 theaters.

== Plot ==
In 1973, Georgiana Latimer schemes with her lover, Josef Sirola, to steal five million dollars in cash from her father's safe. As Georgiana pretends to be a widow in mourning, she and Josef hide the loot in a coffin and plan to transport it by train to New York.

Elsewhere, young Michael Rangeloff is on the run from the irate women's roller derby team that he manages. Michael escapes by disguising himself in a U.S. Army uniform at the Oakland, California, train station, where two military officials assume he is accompanying the coffin. Meanwhile, Georgiana and Sirola have noticed Michael and follow him.

On board, Michael becomes friendly with scatterbrained actress, Standish Logan, and soon discovers the coffin contains millions of dollars. During a stop in Reno, Nevada, Michael telephones his friend, Century Milestone, an experienced conman, who later boards the train dressed as a minister. Meanwhile, the conductor makes an unplanned stop in High River, Nebraska, to deliver the deceased hero to his hometown. Michael and Century get off the train with the coffin, along with Standish, who plays the role of Biddlecoff's widow.

After a quick funeral, Michael and Century unearth the money from the grave. In the meantime, Sirola, who was forced off the train earlier, learns about the hero's burial on television and travels to High River to retrieve the money. Georgiana also arrives in town but is arrested by FBI agent Ormond. When Michael and Century finish gathering the money, they discover Sirola has kidnapped Standish and taken her to an empty farmhouse. However, the home is a prefabricated dwelling, which is towed the next day. Michael and Century locate the moving house, take over from the driver, and confront Sirola. After Standish is rescued, she, Michael, and Century make a getaway with the five million dollars, while Sirola is arrested.

== Cast ==
- Michael O'Keefe as Michael Rangeloff
- Beverly D'Angelo as Standish Logan
- Louis Gossett Jr. as Century
- Pamela Stephenson as Georgiana Latimer
- Ed Lauter as Josef Sirola
- David Wayne as Stapleton
- Brian Dennehy as Mayor Frizzoli
- Jack Riley as Ormond
- John Schuck as Police Chief Norris
- Timothy Blake as Estelle Norris
- Jim Carrey as Corporal Lane Biddlecoff
- Robert Clothier as Art Bumbalee
- Jayne Eastwood as Anna-Marie Biddlecoff
- Alf Humphreys as Mulholland
- Richard Newman as Pawnbroker
- Campbell Lane as Stanton Gilmore

== Production and background ==
The film is based on Charles Dennis' 1974 novel The Next-to-Last Train Ride. (Note: originally published in 1974 by Macmillan. ISBN 0-312-57225-5) Terence and Sandra Marsh acquired the screen rights to Dennis' book, which was going to be their first major feature for their new company, Soundcross Film Ltd. They were offered the chance to develop the property at Warner Bros. Pictures. Terence Marsh received a writing credit for collaborating on the adaptation with Ronny Graham. Terence Marsh wanted to make his directorial debut on the film but understood that the project would have a better chance with an experienced director and instead hired Richard Lester to direct. Warner Bros. insisted on Dudley Moore for the lead, but the Marshes and Lester's concept for the film was that the story was an ensemble cast, rather than a star vehicle. The project then went into turnaround, and in April 1983, CBS Theatrical Films took over financing the $7 million picture.

Principal photography began on August 14, 1983, in Calgary, Alberta, Canada, under the new title Finders Keepers. Lester said that the original nine-week shooting schedule was completed in six, finishing in late September 1983. According to production notes, other Alberta locations included the towns of Lethbridge, Vulcan, Strathmore, Red Deer, and High River.

== Release ==
Warner Bros. was contracted to handle domestic distribution, while CBS Theatrical Films was responsible for international sales. The film opened on May 18, 1984, earning $865,207 during its first weekend in 753 theaters, and had a domestic total gross of $1,467,396.

== Movie soundtrack ==
The following songs were featured in the film.

1. American Pie - (written by Don McLean)
2. Child of vision - (written by Rick Davies and Roger Hodgson)
3. I Get Around - (written by Mike Love and Brian Wilson)
4. Mad About the Boy - (written by Noël Coward)
5. Peggy Sue - (written by Buddy Holly, Norman Petty and Jerry Allison)
6. See You Later, Alligator - (written by Bobby Charles)
7. Sing - (written by Joe Raposo)
8. Take the Long Way Home - (written by Rick Davies and Roger Hodgson)
9. The Yellow Rose of Texas - (composed by Don George)

== Reception ==
James Monaco reviewed the film in his book, The Movie Guide, writing "a crazy, quirky comedy from director Lester that starts slowly and warms up to provide some funny moments. Finders Keepers benefits from the well-judged performances of its energetic cast, with Wayne in particularly good form. In typical Lester fashion, the movie is so frantic that viewers have no time to rest their eyes".

In The New York Times review of the movie, Vincent Canby wrote that "Finders Keepers,...has a lot of charm best described as loose jointed. It's not especially graceful, but it grows increasingly funny as it approaches the Nebraska showdown...though the pacing of the film is uneven - its highpoints stand out like clumps of trees in the flat Nebraska landscape, Finders Keepers is unexpectedly satisfying. The good humor and the wit are even retroactive, making the opening sequences seem funnier than they actually were".

Variety was not so kind in their review, stating that "director Richard Lester returns to his pell-mell trademark and the result is maddening. Interesting cast is wasted, with bright exception of Beverly D'Angelo. Its parts add up to pieces that artlessly lurch and hurtle around".

Roger Fristoe of the Courier Journal liked it. He said that it is "a pleasantly daffy little comedy directed with a fair amount of zip". He also felt that physical comedy was the film's highest point.

David Laubach in his review printed in the Valley Advocate Springfield said it "is a genuine cockeyed comedy" and added that "parts of Finder, Keepers are exceptionally superior to its whole, but Lester keeps things rolling so well, we hardly notice".

William Wolf in his review printed in the Green Bay Press-Gazette said it was "a real gem". To describe it he wrote "the hilarious, wonderfully off-beat gem "Finders Keepers" is definitely a find and should keep audiences in stitches". However he said that he might be overselling it also adding "people can be disappointed and find it isn't as funny as the critics say. There are moments that are a bit too much, and some jokes fall flat. But they don't make these frothy comedies very often, and when one clicks and comes along so unexpectedly it is to be treasured".

Richard Freedman in his review published in The Montana Standard found the film to be "wonderfully wacky" and concluded that "a movie consisting almost entirely of pratfalls and sight gags can wear you down after a while, but everybody involved in Finders Keepers ensures, that this is one comedy that makes nobody in the audience a loser or a weeper."

Audiences polled by CinemaScore gave the film an average grade of "C-" on an A+ to F scale.
