= Shrink Rap (TV series) =

- Genre: Talk show
- Presented by: Pamela Stephenson
- Country of origin: United Kingdom
- No. of series: 3
- No. of episodes: 12

Production
- Running time: 50 minutes
- Production company: Finestripe Productions

Original release
- Network: More4
- Release: 2 April 2007 – 24 February 2010

Shrink Rap is a British television series hosted by clinical psychologist Pamela Stephenson in which she interviews various celebrities using psychotherapeutic techniques. The show focuses on relating various childhood experiences and traumas to the adult difficulties of the celebrities. While quasi-therapeutic in approach, the interviewees were briefed that the conversations were interviews and not strictly therapy.

The programme premiered on More4 on 2 April 2007 and was aired in Australia on ABC2 in 2008.

== Transmissions ==
Series	Episodes	Originally released	
Series	Episodes	First released	Last released
1	5	2 April 2007	6 April 2007
1	Special	15 January 2008	
2	5	21 April 2008	19 May 2008
3	3	14 August 2009	24 February 2010

== Episodes ==
=== Series 1 (2007–08) ===
No. overall	No. in series	Title	Original release date
1	1	"Sharon Osbourne"	2 April 2007
Sharon Osbourne talks about her early life, how her father treated her, and her marriage to Ozzy Osbourne.
2	2	"Stephen Fry"	3 April 2007
3	3	"David Blunkett"	4 April 2007
4	4	"Sarah, Duchess of York"	5 April 2007
Sarah Ferguson talks about how she always feels like a child.
5	5	"Robin Williams"	6 April 2007
Special
6	Sp.	"Chris Langham"	15 January 2008
Chris Langham talks about his childhood sexual abuse, drug abuse, compulsive lying, and his conviction for possessing child pornography.

=== Series 2 (2008) ===
No. overall	No. in series	Title	Original release date
7	1	"Joan Rivers"	21 April 2008
8	2	"Gene Simmons"	28 April 2008
9	3	"Tony Curtis"	5 May 2008
10	4	"Salman Rushdie"	12 May 2008
Salman Rushdie talks about his death threats from the Ayatollah.
11	5	"Kathleen Turner"	19 May 2008

=== Series 3 (2009–10) ===
No. overall	No. in series	Title	Original release date
12	1	"Billy Connolly"	14 August 2009
Pamela interviews her husband, Billy Connolly, on his childhood and his views on the Catholic Church.
13	2	"Heather Mills"	17 February 2010
14	3	"Carrie Fisher"	24 February 2010
