= Lost Empires (novel) =

1965 novel by J. B. Priestley

- First edition
- Author: J. B. Priestley
- Language: English
- Genre: Drama, Theatre-fiction
- Publisher: Heinemann
- Publication date: 1965
- Publication place: United Kingdom
- Media type: Print

Lost Empires is a 1965 novel by the British writer J. B. Priestley. A young man comes of age in the provincial music hall just before the outbreak of the First World War. It was set in a similar milieu to Priestley's earlier work The Good Companions.

In 1986 it was adapted into a television series of the same name starring Colin Firth, John Castle, Laurence Olivier. A BBC radio dramatisation by Bert Coules starring Tom Baker as Nick Ollanton was first broadcast in 1994, most recently repeated on BBC Radio 4 Extra in May 2020.

== Bibliography ==
- John Baxendale. Priestley’s England: J. B. Priestley and English culture. Manchester University Press, 2013.
- Maggie B. Gale. J.B. Priestley. Routledge, 2008.
