= California Graduate Institute =

Independent graduate school specializing in psychology

The California Graduate Institute (CGI) was founded in 1968 as an independent graduate school specializing in psychology, marital and family therapy, and psychoanalysis. CGI and The Chicago School of Professional Psychology formally announced in fall 2008 that they were uniting. The merger was approved by The Chicago School’s accrediting body, the Higher Learning Commission (HLC), in October 2008. HLC joins the Western Association of Schools and Colleges (WASC) as two of six regional associations that accredit public and private schools, colleges, and universities in the United States.

== History ==
The California Graduate Institute was founded in 1968. In the year of its 40th anniversary, CGI merged with The Chicago School of Professional Psychology. Its Westwood and Irvine locations joined The Chicago School’s Los Angeles Campus as part of the school’s regional expansion into Southern California. CGI’s co-founder, Dr. Marvin Koven, is no longer with CGI.

== Degree programs ==
CGI offered both the Masters of Arts and Doctor of Psychology (PsyD) degrees in Psychology (with the possibility to elect a Marital and Family Therapy (MFT) emphasis). Several certificate programs are also offered. The majority of CGI psychology graduates practice in California. CGI was a leading institute in the training of psychoanalytic psychotherapists and the dissemination of psychoanalytic thought.

== Licensure ==
Graduates completing psychology doctoral degree requirements will be eligible to sit for licensure before California’s Board of Psychology (BOP). Students earning the Marital and Family Therapy (MFT) credential will be eligible to sit for licensure by the California Board of Behavior Sciences (BBS).

== CE programs ==
California Graduate Institute was approved for continued education (CE) in various subjects by the following organizations:

- Veteran Administration – approves for GI Bill inclusion a wide range of educational programs (including graduate level education) .
- National Association of Social Workers (NASW) – a member association that offers approval of social work programs in continuing education for its members. However, the association's approval program (NASW CE approval) is not approved by the official Social Work Licensure Boards in several states, including California.
- California Board of Registered Nursing – approves registered nursing and advanced practice nursing programs in California.
- California Board of Behavioral Sciences – approves continuing education providers (such as schools, associations, health facilities, governmental entities, educational institutions, extension programs, individuals, etc) in behavioral science in California.
- Division of Allied Health Professions of the Medical Board of California – approves research programs in Psychoanalysis, the first such program approved by the Allied Health Professions is offered at CGI.
- California Psychological Association – a professional association in California which approves sponsors for continuing education for psychologists. The individual courses are approved by the MCEP Accrediting Agency.
- American Psychological Association (APA) – approves sponsors of continuing education for psychologists. Graduates of unaccredited state-approved schools such as CGI are limited to associate membership in APA.

== Affiliations ==
California Graduate Institute is an accredited member in the Society of Modern Psychoanalysis, a corporation in New York City which accepts membership from institutes after review by an Institute Membership Committee. On approval, the institute becomes an accredited member of the corporation.
