= Private Collection (film) =

1972 Australian black comedy film

- Directed by: Keith Salvat
- Written by: Keith Salvat; Sandy Sharp
- Produced by: Keith Salvat
- Starring: Peter Reynolds; Pamela Stephenson; Brian Blain
- Cinematography: David Gribble
- Edited by: G. Turney-Smith
- Music by: Mike Perjanik
- Production company: Keisal/Bonza Films
- Release dates: June 1972 (premiere); 12 April 1973 (commercial release)
- Running time: 92 minutes
- Country: Australia
- Language: English
- Budget: $30,000

Private Collection is a 1972 Australian black comedy film that marked the feature debuts of Pamela Stephenson and Michael Caton.

== Plot ==
Two rival art collectors, Henry Phillips and Joseph Tibbsworth, engage the services of George Kleptoman, a thief, to steal from each other. In the meantime Mary-Ann, Henry's bored wife, has acquired a secret boyfriend and plans mariticide.

== Cast ==
- Peter Reynolds as Henry Phillips
- Pamela Stephenson as Mary-Ann Phillips
- Brian Blain as Joseph Tibbsworth
- Grahame Bond as George Kleptoman
- John Paramor as The Boyfriend
- Noel Ferrier as Chief Inspector
- Jerry Thomas as Superintendent
- Les Foxcroft as The Citizen

== Production ==
The film was shot on 16mm in Sydney in January 1972. It was the first film with investment from the Australian Film Development Corporation to be publicly shown.

It premiered at the Sydney Film Festival in June of that year.
