= Lost Empires =

- Based on: Lost Empires by J.B. Priestley
- Written by: Ian Curteis
- Directed by: Alan Grint
- Starring: Colin Firth; Laurence Olivier; Pamela Stephenson
- Country of origin: United Kingdom
- Original language: English

Production
- Production company: Granada Television

Original release
- Network: ITV
- Release: 24 October – 5 December 1986

Lost Empires is a 1986 television miniseries adaptation of J. B. Priestley's 1965 novel of the same name and starred Colin Firth, John Castle and Laurence Olivier. Produced by Granada Television, it was shown as a serial, and premiered on the UK's ITV network between 24 October and 5 December 1986.

== Plot ==
After the death of his mother, Richard Herncastle (Colin Firth) is offered a job by his maternal uncle. Nick Ollanton is a stage conjurer in variety theatre and Richard joins the act where he meets the other members of the team and the rest of the acts on the bill as they travel around Britain appearing at the Empires, the old variety theatres that have since vanished. He becomes our eyes as he experiences the last few months of peace before World War I breaks out and changes the world forever.

During the course of the seven episodes (eight hours), Firth's character, young Richard Herncastle, sees the "whole wide world" from backstage at the music hall variety shows with which the magic act travels, just as his uncle Nick (John Castle) has promised—hilarity, beauty, love, lust, fear, despair. Richard comes of age just as the world enters the fateful year of 1914—the outbreak of World War I, when the greatest of all disappearing acts becomes imminent: the disappearance of millions.

The series has the second to last appearance of Olivier as a fading comedian named Harry Burrard, who has long since lost his audience and his comic abilities. Harry should have retired years before, however he has nowhere else to go and his brain is collapsing into paranoia. The role is a sort of older version of Olivier's Archie Rice, from The Entertainer (1960).

== Cast ==
- Colin Firth as Richard Herncastle
- John Castle as Nick Ollanton
- Gillian Bevan as Cissie Mapes
- Beatie Edney as Nancy Ellis
- Laurence Olivier as Harry Burrard
- Carmen du Sautoy as Julie Blane
- Pamela Stephenson as Lilly Farris
- Jim Carter as Inspector Crabbe

== Awards ==
The series was nominated for six Television BAFTA Awards including Best Costume Design, Best Make-up. In the US Olivier received an Emmy Award nomination for Outstanding Supporting Actor in a Miniseries or a Movie.

== Video and DVD ==
The series has been released on both VHS and DVD format.
