= Hilda Fenemore =

British actress (1914–2004)

- Fenemore in Carry On Nurse (1959)
- Born: 22 April 1914; St. Pancras, London, England
- Died: 13 April 2004 (aged 89); Watford, Hertfordshire, England
- Occupation: Actress
- Years active: 1940s–2004

Hilda Lilian Fenemore (22 April 1914 – 13 April 2004) was an English actress with a prolific career in film and television from the 1940s to the 1990s. Fenemore played mainly supporting roles which were characterised in her obituary in The Stage as "friends, neighbours, mothers and passers-by". Her most recognisable roles were as recurring characters Jennie Wren in Dixon of Dock Green (1960–1965) and Elsie the cleaner in Are You Being Served? (1974–1979).

== Early life ==
Hilda Lilian Fenemore was born in St Pancras, London, the eldest child of William John Fenemore, an electrician, and his wife Mary Ellen (nee Johnson). She had a younger brother named William.

== Career ==
Fenemore began her career as a stage actress, joining the company of actors at London's left-wing and progressive Unity Theatre in the 1940s. There she met and married fellow actor Rex Edwards, and worked under the supervision of dramatist Ted Willis, with whom she would later work also in television.

Fenemore made her first film appearance in 1948, and the pattern of her screen career quickly established itself as she featured in a string of supporting parts, mainly in films financed by smaller independent studios rather than the major British set-ups of the day. She appeared in a number of productions financed by the non-profit making Children's Film Foundation, which specialised in adventure-type films made for children, of generally around an hour in length. These films were well regarded as they generally used proven actors and crews, had good production values, and were sophisticated enough to be enjoyed by adults as well as children. In the 1950s, Fenemore continued to work in live theatre, while also accepting work in television.

At the end of the 1950s, Fenemore appeared in two of the early Carry On films, notably in a memorable, albeit brief, cameo in Carry On Nurse (1959) as a wife visiting her husband in hospital, supremely oblivious to the absurdly snobbish impression of upper middle class gentility he has been trying to give his fellow patients, and blithely broadcasting embarrassingly working class trivia at full volume to the entire ward ("I bought this with our divi from the Co-op!") as he cringes in humiliation. In 1960 she was cast as Jennie Wren in Dixon of Dock Green, which reunited her with Willis as scriptwriter, and played the role for the next six years. 1961 brought one of Fenemore's more prominent screen credits, portraying the matriarch of the family at the centre of The Wind of Change, one of the first British films to confront the issue of contemporary race relations.

Through the 1960s and into the 1970s, Fenemore's career increasingly turned to television. She featured in recurring roles in comedy series The Fenn Street Gang (as Mrs. Duffy) and Are You Being Served? (as a cleaner, variously referred to as Ivy, Elsie or Daphne but presumed to be the same person). She also starred in the cult favourite CFF production Chico the Rainmaker, originally shown as a serial during children's Saturday cinema matinees in the UK, and later on PBS in the United States. Fenemore's two final screen credits came in 1978 in the thriller Absolution and as the mother of Oliver Tobias in camp favourite The Stud.

Fenemore's television career continued until the early 1990s, with her last significant appearances in 1992 comedy-drama Going to Seed. According to The Stage, she continued with radio voiceover work almost up to her death.

== Personal life ==
Fenemore married Walter Frederick Edwards in 1938 in Harrow, Middlesex, and they had two sons. She died on 13 April 2004, aged 89, and is buried in East London Cemetery.

== Filmography (partial) ==
- Esther Waters (1948) – Undetermined Minor Role (uncredited)
- The Astonished Heart (1950) – Railway Station Announcer (voice, uncredited)
- Chance of a Lifetime (1950) – Worker
- Saturday Island (1952) – Nurse
- Stand by to Shoot (1953) - Daisy
- Time Bomb (1953) – Jimmy's Mother (uncredited)
- The Titfield Thunderbolt (1953) – Lady Washing Baby (uncredited)
- Turn the Key Softly (1953) – Granny's Daughter (uncredited)
- The Large Rope (1953) - Pub Landlady (uncredited)
- Adventure in the Hopfields (1954) – Mrs. Quin
- Hands of Destiny (1954) – Mrs Kane
- The End of the Road (1954)
- Room in the House (1955)
- Johnny, You're Wanted (1956)
- The Secret Place (1957) – Mrs. Haywood's Neighbour (uncredited)
- The Tommy Steele Story (1957) – Mrs.Steele
- The Strange World of Planet X (1958) – Mrs. Hale
- The Safecracker (1958) – Mrs. McCullers
- Innocent Sinners (1958) – Cassie
- The Young and the Guilty (1958) – Maude Marshall
- Carry On Nurse (1959) – Mrs. Rhoda Bray
- Carry On Constable (1960) – Agitated Woman
- Feet of Clay (1961) – Mrs. Clarke
- The Wind of Change (1961) – Gladys Marley
- Strongroom (1962) – Charlady
- The Boys (1962) – Mrs. Thompson
- The War Lover (1962) – Pub Landlady (uncredited)
- Doctor in Distress (1963) – Railway Station Barmaid (uncredited)
- This Is My Street (1964) – Doris
- Witchcraft (1964) – Nurse
- A Jolly Bad Fellow (1964) – Secretary to Dr. Brass
- Clash by Night (1964) – Mrs. Peel
- The Offence (1972) – Woman on Common
- I Want What I Want (1972) – (uncredited)
- The Bawdy Adventures of Tom Jones (1976) – Mrs. Belcher
- Full Circle (1977) – Katherine
- The Stud (1978) – Tony's mother
- Absolution (1978) – Mrs. Hoskins

== Television ==
Year	Title	Role	Notes
1952	BBC Sunday-Night Theatre	Daisy	Episode: "Stop the Roundabout"
1952	Happy and Glorious	Princess Beatrice	2 episodes
1953	Whirligig	Ada Gomm	3 episodes
1953	Stand by to Shoot	Daisy	Episode: "Falling Star"
1953	BBC Sunday-Night Theatre	Winnie	Episode: "Portrait by Peko"
1954	BBC Sunday-Night Theatre	Mrs Pengard	Episode: "Ambrose Applejohn's Adventure"
1954	BBC Sunday-Night Theatre	Mrs Whitelaw	Episode: "Jeannie"
1954	BBC Sunday-Night Theatre	Mrs Parsons	Episode: "Nineteen Eighty-Four"
1955	Music and Macaroni	Teresa	2 episodes
1955	ITV Television Playhouse	Mrs Grant	Episode: "Mid Level"
1955	Dixon of Dock Green	Mrs Somers	Episode: "Needle in a Haystack"
1955	The Vise	Ruth Karnas	Episode: "Two of a Kind"
1955	Theatre Royal	Housekeeper	Episode: "The Stocking"
1956	ITV Television Playhouse	Miss Pierce	Episode: "Bonaventure"
1956	Dixon of Dock Green	Mrs Joules	Episode: "Eleven Plus"
1956	BBC Sunday-Night Theatre	1st Nanny	Episode: "The Cold Light"
1956	New Ramps for Old	Mrs Belbar	Episode: "All Mod Cons"
1956	ITV Play of the Week	Mrs Ashworth	Episode: "Waters of the Moon"
1956	ITV Television Playhouse	Mrs Marshall	Episode: "The Young and the Guilty"
1956	ITV Television Playhouse	Mrs Lawrence	Episode: "All Correct, Sir"
1957	Boyd Q.C.		Episode: "The Case of Casanova Jones"
1957	ITV Play of the Week	Kate Edwards	Episode: "The Druid's Rest"
1957	Five Names for Johnny	Mrs Sherman	Episode: "The Accusation"
1957	Dixon of Dock Green	Mrs Mayo	Episode: "The Story of Jimmy Mayo"
1957	Educated Evans	Annie Toggs	Episode: "Morality v. Education"
1957–1960	Armchair Theatre	Lilian Burrows	2 episodes
1958	Theatre Night	Ensemble	Episode: "Expresso Bongo"
1958	Ivanhoe	Hilda	Episode: "The Fledgling"
1959	Emergency Ward 10	Bessie Sainsbury	2 episodes
1959	Love and Mr Lewisham	Mrs Chaffrey	2 episodes
1959	Dancers in Mourning	Mrs Pole	2 episodes
1959	The Man Who Finally Died	Mrs Schneider	Episode: "The Hunt"
1959	The Flying Doctor	Mrs Stevens	Episode: "Boomerang"
1960	No Hiding Place	Mrs Williamson	Episode: "The Final Chase"
1960	Dixon of Dock Green	Maisie	Episode: "The Black and the White"
1960	Probation Officer	Mrs Harrison	1 episode
1960	Deadline Midnight	Mrs Breen	1 episode
1960	BBC Sunday-Night Play	Mrs Wardle	Episode: "A Time to Fight"
1960–1965	Dixon of Dock Green	Jennie Wren	Recurring role; 40 episodes
1961	The Cheaters	Mrs Evans	Episode: "For the Price of Two"
1961	No Hiding Place	Mrs Welch	Episode: "The Final Fling"
1961	Maigret	Madame Ducrau	Episode: "The Golden Fleece"
1962	Emergency Ward 10	Mary Harper	2 episodes
1962	The Franchise Affair	Mrs Bratt	1 episode
1962	Drama 61-67	Victoria Poster	Episode: "Drama '62: Recruiting Poster"
1962	Drama 61-67	Alice Carter	Episode: "Drama '62: A Chance in Life"
1962	BBC Sunday-Night Play	Emily Britten	Episode: "The Big Eat"
1962	Harpers West One	Mrs Hedges	1 episode
1962	Suspense	Vera Prentice	Episode: "On the Night of the Murder"
1963	Sergeant Cork	Nellie	Episode: "The Case of the Girl Upstairs"
1963	First Night	Mary Gilmour	Episode: "Funny Noises with Their Mouths"
1964	Thorndyke	Mrs Brattle	Episode: "Percival Bland's Mother"
1964	R3	Mrs Fields	Episode: "The Short Cut"
1965	Thursday Theatre	Agnes	Episode: "Johnson over Jordan"
1965	Londoners	Mrs Mollins	Episode: "The Frighteners"
1966	Emergency Ward 10	Mrs Mayer	Episode: "Fat Annie"
1967	Adam Adamant Lives!	Mrs Clasp	Episode: "The Survivors"
1967	Sanctuary	Sister Agnes	Episode: "The Face of Hunger"
1967	Z Cars	Mrs Carter	2 episodes
1968	Public Eye	Mrs Claverton	Episode: "Memories of Meg"
1968	Detective	Mrs Poltensky	Episode: "Dover and the Poison Pen Letters"
1968	Z Cars	Connie Hughes	2 episodes
1968	Nana	Madame Lerat	2 episodes
1969	Scene	Ellen	Episode: "Time Hurries On"
1969	The Newcomers	May Burrows	2 episodes
1969	The Expert	Mrs Haskins	Episode: "Your Money for My Life"
1969	Detective	Mrs Law	Episode: "Put Out the Light"
1970	The Doctors	Mrs Dent	1 episode
1970	Steptoe and Son	Mrs Woods	Episode: "Men of Property"
1970	Comedy Playhouse	Mum	Episode: "Mind Your Own Business"
1971	Z Cars	Mrs Bennett	2 episodes
1971	Justice	Olive Parsons	2 episodes
1971	The Runaway Summer	Mrs Carver	2 episodes
1971–1973	The Fenn Street Gang	Mrs Duffy	8 episodes
1972	The Man Outside	Marjorie Griffen	Episode: "Eric"
1972	Emma	Mrs Cole	1 episode
1972	Comedy Playhouse	Housekeeper	Episode: "Weren't You Marcia Honeywell?"
1973	Hunter's Walk	Mrs Waller	Episode: "Behaviour"
1973	Crown Court	Martha Cousins	3 episodes
1974	The Boy with Two Heads	Hilda Page	7 episodes
1974–1979	Are You Being Served?	Elsie	7 episodes
1975	Thriller	Mrs Harper	Episode: "The Double Kill"
1975	Dawson's Weekly	Mrs Finch	Episode: "Les Miserables"
1975	Dad's Army	Queenie Beal	Episode: "Ring Dem Bells"
1976	The Liver Birds	Cafe Attendant	Episode: "The Maypole"
1976	The Duchess of Duke Street	Mrs Parker	Episode: "The Outsiders"
1977	Headmaster	Stallholder	Episode: "Our Patrick"
1977	London Belongs to Me	Mrs Smyth	1 episode
1977	The Fuzz	Woman in shop	Episode: "Pending Further Enquiries"
1978	Play of the Week	Mrs Hewlings	Episode: "Flayed"
1979	Murder at the Wedding	Mrs Hignell	1 episode
1979	Mike Yarwood in Persons	British Rail waitress	1 episode
1979	Minder	Passer-by (uncredited)	Episode: "The Bounty Hunter"
1979	Two People	Betty	Episode: "Back to Earth"
1980	Together	Dora Klein	Regular role; 20 episodes
1980	In Loving Memory	Cow Farmer	Episode: "The Outing"
1980	It Ain't Half Hot Mum	Mrs Parkins	Episode: "The Great Broadcast"
1981	Solo	Mother-in-law	1 episode
1982	Chronicle	Miss Booth	Episode: "For the Love of Egypt"
1982	The Haunting of Cassie Palmer	Mrs Pettifeather	2 episodes
1983	Hallelujah!	Woman	Episode: "Struck Down"
1983	The Witches and the Grinnygog	Mrs Featherly	1 episode
1985	There Comes a Time	Doris	1 episode
1985	The Kenny Everett Television Show		1 episode
1985	Murder of a Moderate Man	Beth	3 episodes
1985	South of the Border	Mrs Fishlock	Episode: "An Uneventful Sort of Day"
1986	Kit Curran	Bingo Woman	Episode: "One Door Closes"
1987	Filthy Rich & Catflap	Charlady	Episode: "Game Show"
1987	Up Line	Mrs Coombes	4 episodes
1987	French and Saunders	Woman at Seance	1 episode
1987	Don't Wait Up	Florrie	1 episode
1987	Life Without George	Mrs Flynn	1 episode
1987	Vanity Fair	Mrs Firkin	5 episodes
1988	Brookside	Molly Harrison	1 episode
1988–1990	Mr Majeika	Mrs Fudd	2 episodes
1989	Ffizz	Miss Partridge	Episode: "Plus ca change"
1990	The Play on One	Mrs Thackeray	Episode: "Killing Time"
1991	Taking the Floor	Old Lady 2	Episode: "In the Mood"
1991	ScreenPlay	Sylvia Bannister	Episode: "Broke"
1991	The Bill	Neighbour	Episode: "Delivery on Time"
1992	London's Burning	Old woman	1 episode
1992	Gone to Seed	Miss Pringle	6 episodes
1993	The Bill	Mrs Molloy	Episode: "On the Loose"
1993	Goodnight Sweetheart	Old Lady	Episode: "I Get Along Without You Very Well"
1994	Harry Enfield and Chums	Old Lady at Bus Stop	1 episode
