= Brenda de Banzie =

English actress (1909–1981)

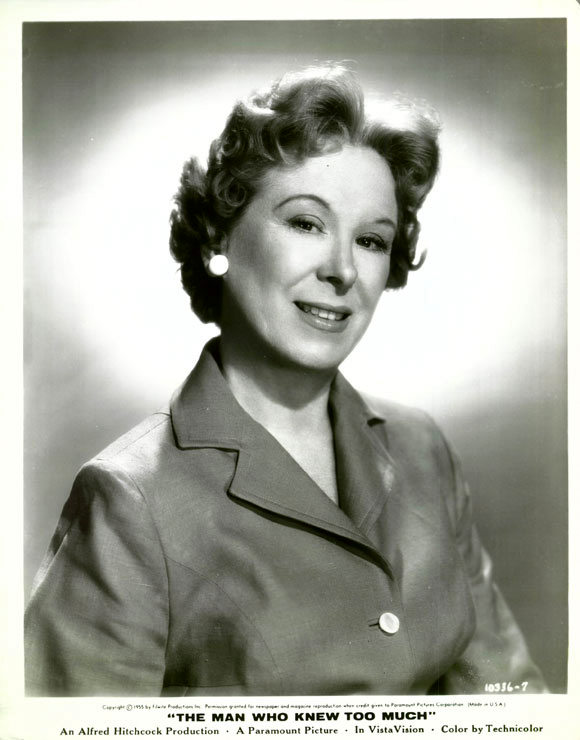
- De Banzie in 1956
- Born: Brenda Doreen Mignon de Banzie; 28 July 1909; Manchester, Lancashire, England
- Died: 5 March 1981 (aged 71); Haywards Heath, Sussex, England
- Years active: 1951–1971
- Spouse: Rupert Marsh (m. 1934)
- Children: 1

Brenda Doreen Mignon de Banzie (28 July 1909 – 5 March 1981) was a British actress of stage and screen.

== Biography ==
Brenda Doreen Mignon de Banzie (28 July 1909 – 5 March 1981) was a British actress of stage and screen. She was the daughter of Edward Thomas de Banzie, conductor and musical director, and his second wife Dorothy (née Lancaster), whom he married in 1908. She was the aunt of actress Lois de Banzie. In 1911, the family lived in Salford, Lancashire. She married Alexander Marsh in 1934 and had a child Antony Marsh.

=== Career ===
She appeared as Maggie Hobson in the David Lean film version of Hobson's Choice (1954) with John Mills and Charles Laughton, set in Salford. Laughton allegedly didn't like de Banzie, because she wasn't getting 'her part right' (maybe because in the film she successfully opposed Laughton). De Banzie also upstaged Laughton who was, by all accounts, a notorious upstager himself.

Another notable film role was as Phoebe Rice, the hapless wife of comedian Archie Rice (played by Laurence Olivier) in the 1960 film version of John Osborne's The Entertainer. She had also appeared in London and on Broadway in the original play, for which she received a Tony Award nomination.

Other memorable film roles included The Man Who Knew Too Much (1956) directed by Alfred Hitchcock, Too Many Crooks (1959), and The Pink Panther (1963) directed by Blake Edwards. She made numerous films for the Rank Organisation.

De Banzie died at the age of 71 due to complications following brain surgery.

== Selected filmography ==
- The Long Dark Hall (1951) – Mrs. Rogers
- I Believe in You (1952) – Mrs. Hooker
- Private Information (1952) – Dolly
- Never Look Back (1952) – Molly Wheeler
- The Yellow Balloon (1953) – Fruit Stall Customer (uncredited)
- A Day to Remember (1953) – Mrs. Collins
- Don't Blame the Stork (1954) – Evelyn Steele
- Hobson's Choice (1954) – Maggie Hobson
- What Every Woman Wants (1954) – Sarah
- The Purple Plain (1954) – Miss McNab
- The Happiness of Three Women (1954) – Jane Price
- As Long as They're Happy (1955) – Stella Bentley
- A Kid for Two Farthings (1955) – 'Lady' Ruby
- Doctor at Sea (1955) – Muriel Mallet
- The Man Who Knew Too Much (1956) – Lucy Drayton
- House of Secrets (1956) – Mme. Isabella Ballu
- Passport to Shame (1958) – Aggie
- Too Many Crooks (1959) – Lucy
- The 39 Steps (1959) – Nellie Lumsden
- The Entertainer (1960) – Phoebe Rice
- The Mark (1961) – Gertrude Cartwright
- Flame in the Streets (1961) – Nell Palmer
- Come September (1961) – Margaret Allison
- A Pair of Briefs (1962) – Gladys Worthing
- I Thank a Fool (1962) – Nurse Drew
- The Pink Panther (1963) – Angela Dunning
- Pretty Polly (1967) – Mrs. Innes-Hook
