= Them Nice Americans =

1958 British film by Tony Young

- Theatrical release poster
- Directed by: Tony Young (as Anthony Young)
- Written by: Gilbert Winfield
- Produced by: Anthony Young; Richard Lawrence Griffith; Bill Luckwell (uncredited)
- Starring: Bonar Colleano; Vera Day; Renée Houston
- Cinematography: Ernest Palmer
- Edited by: John Ferris
- Music by: Wilfred Burns
- Production company: Chelsea Films
- Release date: 1 September 1958
- Running time: 76 minutes
- Country: United Kingdom
- Language: English

Them Nice Americans is a 1958 British second feature comedy-drama film directed by Tony Young and starring Bonar Colleano, Vera Day and Renée Houston. It was written by Gilbert Winfield.

== Plot ==
Johnny is an American G.I. stationed in the British village of Broomfield and falls in love with local girl Ann Adams. Her father, Chief Inspector Adams, dislikes Americans and disapproves of his daughter's relationship. Johnny's buddy Joe decides to start a campaign to make the Americans more popular with the villagers, but all his plans go wrong. However, when Johnny rescues Ann's small brother Billy from a minefield, her father relents and gives permission for the marriage.

== Cast ==
- Bonar Colleano as Joe
- Vera Day as Ann Adams
- Renée Houston as Mrs Adams
- Sheldon Lawrence as Johnny
- Basil Dignam as Inspector Adams
- Patti Morgan as Lady Theodora
- Michael Wade as Billy Adams
- Ryck Rydon as Butch
- Anthony Wilson as Doug
- Gilbert Winfield as USAF captain (as Gil Winfield)
- Don Gilliland as Mickey
- Roland Brand as Jerry
- Bill Edwards as Elmer
- Robert Jackson as Miller
- Chuck Kayser as Rossi
- John Evans as Harry
- John Watson as British major
- Totti Truman Taylor as Miss Gimpy
- Denis Gilmore as the Indian
- Kenneth Collins as spaceman
- John Stacy as Vicar
- Jan Kent as Vicar's wife
- Marian Collins as Vicar's daughter
- Grace Webb as fortune teller
- Roger Spencer as cowboy
- Caroline Glazer as tiny tot
- David Havard as curate
- Carl Conway as policeman
- Janet Moss as 1st library girl
- Diana Potter as 2nd library girl
- Charlie Dalton as 3rd library girl

== Production ==
The film was shot at Merton Park studios.

== Critical reception ==
The Monthly Film Bulletin wrote: "This is an unexceptional but pleasant little film which has the benefit of some amusing dialogue and bright playing; but the humour dwindles away towards the end and the attempted suspense of the final minefield episode is noticeably out of key with the rest."

Picture Show rated the film as "good", writing: "Unassuming but amusing comedy ....The plot is well handled by the extremely competent cast."

In British Sound Films: The Studio Years 1928–1959 David Quinlan rated the film as "average", writing: "Attractive little film, if very minor."
