= Too Many Crooks =

1959 British film by Mario Zampi

- Film poster by Nicola Simbari
- Directed by: Mario Zampi
- Written by: Jean Nery (story); Michael Pertwee; Christiane Rochefort
- Produced by: Mario Zampi
- Starring: Terry-Thomas; George Cole; Brenda de Banzie; Sidney James; Bernard Bresslaw; Vera Day
- Cinematography: Stanley Pavey
- Edited by: Bill Lewthwaite
- Music by: Stanley Black
- Production company: Rank Organisation Film Productions
- Distributed by: Rank Film Distributors (UK)
- Release date: 8 March 1959 (UK)
- Running time: 87 minutes
- Country: United Kingdom
- Language: English

Too Many Crooks is a 1959 British black comedy film directed by Mario Zampi and starring Terry-Thomas, George Cole, Brenda De Banzie, Sidney James, Bernard Bresslaw and Vera Day. It was written by Michael Pertwee and Christiane Rochefort from a story by Jean Nery.

A bunch of inept crooks kidnap the wife of a shady businessman, only for him to decide he doesn't want her back.

== Plot ==
The members of a gang, especially Sid, grow impatient as their incompetent leader, Fingers, botches the robbery of a fur store, the latest in a series of disasters. Fingers then comes up with the idea of robbing businessman William Gordon. Gordon bluffs them into believing the police are on their way. Fingers refuses to give up, plotting to kidnap Gordon's daughter. However, he errs yet again and ends up with Gordon's meek wife Lucy instead.

Thinking she will do just as well, Fingers demands £25,000 ransom for her safe return. To his surprise, Gordon gleefully refuses. The philanderer has been carrying on an affair with his secretary and would like nothing better than to be rid of his dowdy wife. Fingers desperately lowers his price over and over again, finally offering to give her back for a mere £200, but is turned down.

When Lucy learns of this, her love for her husband is extinguished. She decides to get revenge and soon takes charge of the gang (her wartime training in unarmed combat coming in handy). Knowing of Gordon's tax dispute with the Inland Revenue and his distrust of banks, she figures out where he has hidden much of his money. She leads the gangsters in stealing the cash and, for good measure, the furs and jewellery Gordon had lavished on his mistress, taking half of the proceeds for her share. On leaving Gordon's house through the bedroom window a lit cigarette is left, which unintentionally burns the house down. Gordon returns and, thinking his money is burning, repeatedly jumps into the burning building.

By coincidence, the next day, the newspapers report a gruesome murder, just like the one Fingers had threatened. Gordon jumps to the wrong conclusion, and Lucy makes him pay some more for his mistake. She has Sid and Fingers impersonate policemen investigating her disappearance. Fingers extorts most of the rest of Gordon's ready cash in exchange for letting the matter drop. When a real Scotland Yard inspector shows up soon after, Gordon loses his temper and raises suspicions of murder.

Desperate, he decides to flee the country. Fingers's ex-stripper girlfriend offers to provide a forged passport. He agrees to meet her later, after visiting his mother. Lucy guesses that he is going there to pick up a final stash of money. The gang shows up and finds him with a suitcase. When the police come to question Gordon further, Fingers takes the suitcase (containing £50,000) and leaves, Gordon being too afraid to raise a fuss. Then Lucy walks in on her now-penniless husband.

Fingers and his gang decide to keep all of this last windfall and not split it with Lucy, but as they drive away, the suitcase pops open unnoticed and the money is scattered on the road.

== Cast ==
- Terry-Thomas as William Delaney Gordon – "Bill"
- George Cole as Fingers
- Brenda De Banzie as Lucy Gordon
- Bernard Bresslaw as Snowdrop
- Sidney James as Sid
- Vera Day as Charmaine
- Delphi Lawrence as Beryl
- John Le Mesurier as magistrate
- Sydney Tafler as solicitor
- Rosalie Ashley as Angela Gordon
- Nicholas Parsons as Tommy Weston
- Terry Scott as fire policeman
- Vilma Ann Leslie as Girl Journalist
- Edie Martin as Gordon's mother
- Tutte Lemkow as swarthy man
- John Stuart as Inspector Jensen
- Joe Melia as Whisper
- Arthur Brough as beggar (uncredited)
- Sam Kydd as tramp (uncredited)
- Howard Pays as policeman at traffic lights (uncredited)
- Victor Brooks court usher (uncredited)

== Production ==
It was the second film Zampi made for Rank, following The Naked Truth. Filming took place in September 1958.

== Reception ==
=== Box office ===
In December 1959 Kinematograph Weekly claimed the film "did well" at the box office although it did not list it among the movies that performed "better than average" for the year.

=== Critical ===
Variety wrote the film "has been artfully constructed in the search of yocks by Michael Pertwee, a skilled purveyor of the kind of plot, situation, characterization and dialog needed for this sort of unambitious, happy-go-lucky lark. Satire, slapstick and light comedy are mingled, sometimes uneasily. Much of the pic is irresistibly funny, but it occasionally lags."

Josh Billings of Kinematograph Weekly wrote " I can’t say I found Mario Zampi's latest comedy a sustained riot, but the deadheads at the press show thoroughly enjoyed it and, much more important, it’s definitely packing ‘em into the Odeon, Marble Arch. Obviously, the film’s immediate success is partly due to Bernard Bresslaw, one of its co-stars. He can't do wrong at the moment."

The Monthly Film Bulletin wrote: "This crime-comedy extravaganza is disappointingly lacking in pace and spontaneous humour. The bungling gangsters are a pale reflection of The Ladykillers [1955], while Terry-Thomas contributes little more than his familiar, and here rather faded, charm. There is, however, some slight compensation in Sidney James's resourceful performance."

In The New York Times, Bosley Crowther described the film as "a good, crazy, brisk farce comedy."

Filmink wrote "George Cole tries unsuccessfully to channel Peter Sellers, Zampi’s handling feels slack, but the film has its moments."

The Radio Times Guide to Films gave the film 3/5 stars, writing: "This picture never lives up to its billing, largely owing to the cack-handed direction of Mario Zampi. Terry-Thomas gives a priceless performance as the wheeler-dealer unconcerned whether he sees abducted wife Brenda de Banzie ever again, but George Cole, Sid James and the gang overdo the "cor blimey" criminality."

Leslie Halliwell said: "Agreeable farce with black edges and an excellent chase sequence."

In British Sound Films: The Studio Years 1928–1959 David Quinlan rated the film as "average", writing: "Crazy comedy not always paced as well as riotous car chase at the end."

== See also ==
- Ruthless People, a 1986 film with a similar plot
