= My Death Is a Mockery =

1952 British film by Tony Young

- Directed by: Tony Young
- Written by: Douglas Baber (novel)
- Produced by: David Dent
- Starring: Donald Houston; Kathleen Byron; Bill Kerr
- Cinematography: Phil Grindrod
- Edited by: Lito Carruthers
- Production company: Park Lane Films
- Distributed by: Adelphi Films
- Release date: 1 August 1952
- Running time: 75 minutes
- Country: United Kingdom
- Language: English

My Death Is a Mockery is a 1952 British second feature ('B') crime film directed by Tony Young and starring Donald Houston, Kathleen Byron and Bill Kerr. It was written by Douglas Baber from his 1952 novel of the same name.

It attracted notoriety as the film watched by Christopher Craig earlier in the day on which he shot dead a policeman during a failed burglary.

== Synopsis ==
After being condemned to death, a man recounts the events that have brought him there. A struggling Brixham fisherman, he was persuaded by an Australian chancer to switch to smuggling brandy from the French coast. However the murder of a policeman rapidly leads to things falling apart.

== Cast ==
- Donald Houston as John Bradley
- Kathleen Byron as Helen Bradley
- Bill Kerr as Hansen
- Eddie Leslie as Le Cambre
- Liam Gaffney as Father Matthews
- Kenneth Henry as Inspector
- Felix Felton as Closterman
- Sheila McCormack as Patsy, barmaid
- Christopher Quest as first customs officer
- Michael Voysey as second customs officer
- Vincent Holman as prison governor
- Meadows White as warder
- Christmas Grose as sailor

== Production ==
It was made at the Brighton Studios.

== Critical reception ==
The Monthly Film Bulletin wrote: "Unfortunately the script, particularly at first, is rather pompous and artificial. Otherwise, the film is technically adequate and acting and direction have a certain freshness."

Picturegoer wrote: "Surely stories about smuggling should pack a thrill, or else pursue a comedy course on the lines of Whisky Galore! Yet this picture does neither. ... It is all very verbose. The acting seems to lack vitality and spontaneity, and the action is dilatory and mainly unexciting. Donald Houston as the boat's captain is quite acceptable, but Kathleen Byron is completely wasted in the role of his young wife."

Picture Show wrote: "It is well handled and told."

In British Sound Films: The Studio Years 1928–1959 David Quinlan rated the film as "mediocre", writing: "Drama is resolutely dark and glum, minimally entertaining."
