= Tony Young (director) =

British director and producer (1917–1966)

Tony Young (1917–1966), sometimes credited as Anthony Young, was a British film director and television producer. His films include Penny Points to Paradise (1951) (the feature film debut of the stars of The Goon Show, Spike Milligan, Harry Secombe and Peter Sellers), The Eternal Question (1956), and The Runaway (1963).

Young also produced The Telegoons (1963–1964) for BBC Television.

== Filmography (director) ==
- Penny Points to Paradise (1951)
- My Death Is a Mockery (1952)
- Hands of Destiny (1954)
- Port of Escape (1956)
- The Eternal Question (1956)
- Them Nice Americans (1958)
- Hidden Homicide (1959)
- The Runaway (1963)
- Delayed Flight (1964)
