= The Entertainer (play) =

1957 production by John Osborne

Cover of 1957 edition of script, showing Laurence Olivier as Archie Rice

The Entertainer is a three-act play by John Osborne, first produced in 1957. His first play, Look Back in Anger, had attracted mixed notices but a great deal of publicity. Having depicted an "angry young man" in the earlier play, Osborne wrote at Laurence Olivier's request about an angry middle-aged man in The Entertainer. Its main character is Archie Rice, a failing music-hall performer. Years later, Tony Richardson, who directed The Entertainer's premiere season, described Archie as "the embodiment of a national mood ... Archie was the future, the decline, the sourness, the ashes of old glory, where Britain was heading". The first performance was given on 10 April 1957 at the Royal Court Theatre, London. This theatre was well known for its commitment to new and non-traditional drama, and the inclusion of a West End star such as Olivier in the cast caused much interest.

== Synopsis ==
The play is in three acts, sub-divided into thirteen scenes. Some are set in the Rice family's house, and others show Archie Rice on stage at the music hall.

=== Act 1 ===
- Billy Rice, a retired music-hall star, settles down at home and is interrupted by his granddaughter Jean, making an unannounced visit. They talk about Archie (Billy's son, and Jean's father) and Phoebe, Archie's second wife, Jean's stepmother. Billy speaks negatively of them and of modern society in general.
- In a music hall, Archie opens the show with a short would-be comic patter and a brief song and dance routine. The song is called "Why should I care?" and ends, "If they see that you're blue, they'll look down on you, So why should I bother to care?"
- At the house Billy, Phoebe and Jean drink and talk. Jean explains she had a disagreement with Graham, her fiancé, breaking their engagement. They also discuss Archie's sons, Mick and Frank. Mick is in the army, fighting overseas, but Frank refused to be conscripted and served a six-month jail sentence in consequence.
- Back at the music hall, Archie delivers further ingratiating comic patter and sings a jingoistic song in praise of the British Empire and personal selfishness ("Number one's the only one for me!")
- At the house Archie returns from the theatre to find his daughter Jean visiting. He tells them his show did not go well, and makes some casually bigoted remarks about race and sexuality. He proposes a toast to the twentieth anniversary of his not paying income tax. Billy is unimpressed. Archie learns of Jean's broken engagement but appears unconcerned. Phoebe drinks too much and becomes emotional and retires to bed. Billy also turns in, leaving Archie and Jean alone. He reveals that Mick has been taken prisoner.

=== Act 2 ===
- The next day at the house, the rest of the family find out from the newspaper that Mick is a prisoner of war. They take comfort from the report which says he will be sent back home. Billy and Phoebe talk about Archie's lack of understanding. Billy talks about the good old days, and snaps at Phoebe for talking too much. Phoebe talks about Bill, Archie's brother, and how he bailed Archie out of a lot of trouble and has treated Phoebe kindly. Frank and Archie come home. Archie agrees Bill has been good to them. Frank wants to celebrate Jean's visit and Mick's homecoming. Archie gives a monologue about how crazy the family is and how it is hard for Jean to understand them well since she is the sensible one. Billy comes in from the kitchen and Phoebe finds that he has been eating the cake she has bought to welcome Mick back home. She becomes hysterical and Archie tries to calm the family down.
- At the music hall, Archie's patter consists of a series of insulting remarks about his wife. His song is "Thank God I'm normal", a hymn to mediocrity.
- Back at the house, members of the family bicker. Frank starts a sing-song; three generations of the Rice family join in singing "The Absent-Minded Beggar" and for a short while the atmosphere is happy. Phoebe shows Jean a letter from her brother's daughter. It is about her brother's business in Canada. She is thinking of having the family move to Canada to help the business. Archie dismisses the idea. Left alone with Jean, he says that behind his eyes he is dead, and nothing touches him any more. He tells her that his affections have moved from Phoebe to a much younger woman. Phoebe comes back and says the police are at the door. Archie assumes it is the income tax man. Frank comes in and announces that Mick has been killed.

=== Act 3 ===
- Frank, alone at the piano, sings about bringing Mick's body back.
- In the house, Billy reminisces nostalgically. Archie says he does not care about emotions. Jean criticises him bitterly, and Phoebe tries to defend him against her accusations. Jean tells Frank about Archie's love affair. Archie tries to bring Billy out of retirement to give the music hall show a boost. Jean disapproves because Billy is too old and frail. Archie tells Jean that Billy has sabotaged Archie's affair with the young woman by seeking her parents out and telling them that Archie is married.
- At the music hall, Archie announces that Billy will not appear tonight or ever again. He exits, and the scene fades into an image of Billy's funeral cortège.
- Two separate conversations take place between Jean and her boyfriend Graham on the one hand and Archie and his successful brother Bill on the other. Jean refuses to come back to Graham and insists that her place must be with Phoebe. Brother Bill has bought the family tickets to travel to Canada, but Archie refuses to go, though recognising that ruin and jail await him if he stays in England.
- At the music hall, Archie does not give his usual slick patter but discourses philosophically, and after a reprise of "Why should I care?", he leaves the stage in darkness. "Archie Rice has gone. There is only the music," reads the stage direction.

== Production ==
Years later, in The Long-Distance Runner: An Autobiography, Richardson reflected on the role the play played in his life: “I couldn't have articulated it, having never been introspective...(but) The Entertainer was a key moment in my development, because all the ideas and convictions I was to work with afterward were crystallized in its making.”

Writing for TCM, Felicia Feaster reports Richardson's memories of creating the play as well as the film: "The character of Archie Rice, which tapped into aspects of Larry's personality that he'd never used before, immediately obsessed him. He accepted the play before it was even finished." After rehearsals began, Richardson recalled, “His understanding of Archie was so complete that he could make anything work. He infected everyone with his enthusiasm.”

The original music for the play was composed by John Addison. Melodies by Thomas Hastings ("Rock of Ages"), Arthur Sullivan ("Onward Christian Soldiers" and "The Absent-Minded Beggar"), and George Ware ("The Boy I Love is Up in the Gallery") are also incorporated.

== Stage productions ==
The original production at the Royal Court was directed by Tony Richardson, with décor by Alan Tagg.

Original cast

- Billy – George Relph
- Jean – Dorothy Tutin (replaced by Joan Plowright when the play moved to the West End)
- Phoebe – Brenda de Banzie
- Archie – Laurence Olivier
- Frank – Richard Pasco
- Gorgeous Gladys – Vivienne Drummond
- Brother Bill – Aubrey Dexter
- Graham – Stanley Meadows

The show transferred in September to the Palace Theatre in the West End, toured and returned to the Palace. During the run Joan Plowright left the cast and was replaced by Geraldine McEwan. Plowright rejoined the cast when the production opened in New York in February 1958. In the same year, a touring production was presented in the British provinces, starring John Slater as Archie and Bobby Howes as Billy.

London revivals have starred Max Wall (Greenwich Theatre, 1974); Peter Bowles (Shaftesbury Theatre, 1986); Robert Lindsay (Old Vic, 2007); and Kenneth Branagh (Garrick Theatre, 2016).

In August 2019, a new UK tour began at the Curve, Leicester, starring Shane Richie as Archie and directed by Sean O'Connor. In this production. the play was set in 1982, during the Falklands war. The final performance took place at Richmond Theatre in London on 30 November 2019.

In early 2028, David Tennant will play Archie in a revival directed by Dominic Cooke at the Almeida Theatre, London.

== Adaptations ==
A 1960 film version was adapted by Nigel Kneale and John Osborne, produced by future James Bond Producer Harry Saltzman. It was directed by Tony Richardson and starred Laurence Olivier, Brenda De Banzie, Roger Livesey, Joan Plowright, Shirley-Anne Field, Alan Bates, Daniel Massey, Thora Hird and Albert Finney. Olivier was nominated for an Academy Award for Best Actor for his performance.

On 10 March 1976, NBC broadcast a two-hour semi-musical version of the play, starring Jack Lemmon as Archie. The setting was changed to a seaside resort in the United States; Marvin Hamlisch wrote the music, Tim Rice (Sir Timothy, since 1994) provided the lyrics.

Michael Gambon starred in a production for the BBC broadcast on 4 December 1993.

In November 2008, BBC Radio 7 broadcast a radio version, adapted by John Foley, featuring Bill Nighy as Archie, Cheryl Campbell as Phoebe, David Bradley as Billy, Sarah Jane Holm as Jean and Bertie Carvel as Frank.

== Critical reception ==
Olivier played Archie to sellout crowds in London and New York, but as critic Janet Feaster observes, when it came to the film, critics were divided, and ”despite a remarkable performance, Olivier ultimately never achieved the stunning success and adoration with the cinematic version that he had enjoyed with the play.“

In The Observer, Kenneth Tynan wrote, "Mr Osborne has had the big and brilliant notion of putting the whole of contemporary England onto one and the same stage ... He chooses, as his national microcosm, a family of run-down vaudevillians. Grandad, stately and retired, represents Edwardian graciousness, for which Mr Osborne has a deeply submerged nostalgia. But the key figure is Dad, a fiftyish song-and-dance man reduced to appearing in twice-nightly nude revue."

In April 1957, The Manchester Guardian was lukewarm, finding the climax of the play "banal" but added, "Sir Laurence brings to the wretched hero a wonderful sniggering pathos now and then and ultimately gives the little figure some tragic size. It is no great play but no bad evening either."

The Times made no connection between the play and the condition of post-Imperial Britain, in its April 1957 review, regarding the play as almost "the sombre, modern equivalent of Pinero's Trelawny of the Wells." By the time of the 1974 revival, The Times was agreeing with Tynan: "Everyone remembers The Entertainer for its brilliant equation between Britain and a dilapidated old music hall", but added that the play is also "one of the best family plays in our repertory".

In his August 2016 review of the production starring Branagh, Henry Hitchings observed: “As for Osborne's play, it hasn't aged all that well, with its flashes of misogyny now pretty hard to stomach. Yet it still has unsettling resonance as a portrait of Britain in decline.”

== See also ==
- Kitchen sink realism
