= Womaneater =

1958 British film by Charles Saunders

- Directed by: Charles Saunders
- Screenplay by: Brandon Fleming
- Produced by: Guido Coen
- Starring: George Coulouris; Vera Day
- Cinematography: Ernest Palmer
- Edited by: Seymour Logie
- Music by: Edwin Astley
- Color process: Black and white
- Production company: Fortress Film Productions
- Distributed by: Eros Films
- Release date: April 1958 (UK)
- Running time: 70 minutes
- Country: United Kingdom
- Language: English

Womaneater (also known as The Woman Eater and The Womaneater) is a 1958 British low budget second feature ('B') horror film directed by Charles Saunders and starring George Coulouris and Vera Day. It was written by Brandon Fleming. Produced by Guido Coen, the film recounts the story of a crazed scientist who feeds women to a flesh-eating tree in return for a serum that can bring the dead back to life.

== Plot ==
At the Explorers' Club in London, Dr Moran tells the other members about "a tribe in the depths of the Amazon jungle" which has "a miracle-working JuJu that can bring the dead back to life" and that he's going on an expedition to get it. He finds the tribe and witnesses a secret ceremony in which a young woman, entranced by beating drums, is consumed by a large carnivorous tree. Moran then nearly dies from "jungle fever".

Five years later, recovered and back in Britain at his manor house, Moran is experimenting with the tree. He has brought it and the tribal drummer, Tanga, back from the Amazon. They kidnap a young English woman, Susan Curtis, and Tanga feeds her to the tree. "She'll become a part of the plant. And from it I'll get the serum to bring the dead back to life. She won't have died in vain", declares Moran. However, the experiment fails. A dead heart into which Moran injects the serum revives, but dies again after a short time.

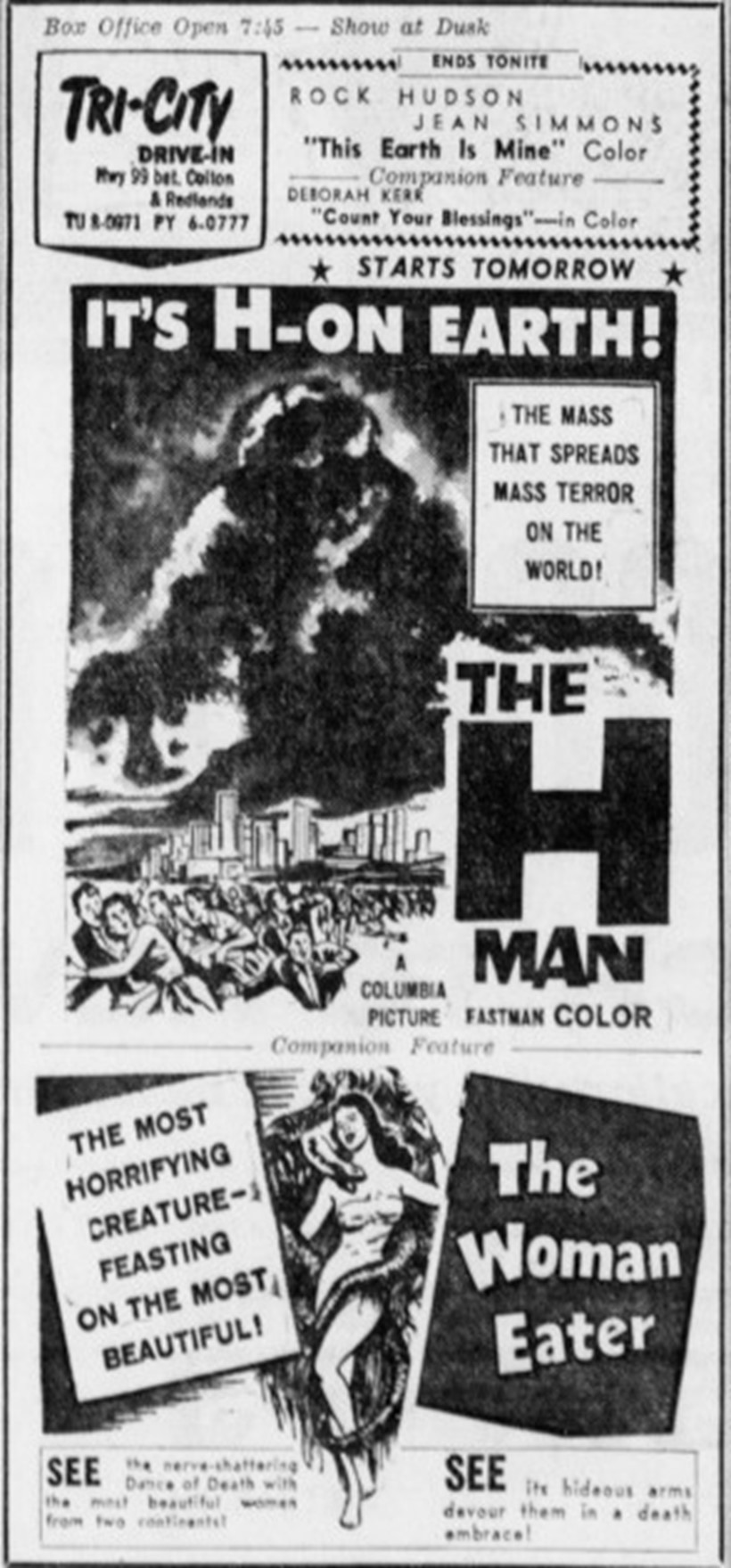
Drive-in advertisement from 1959 for The Woman Eater and co-feature, The H-Man.

Police Sgt Bolton arrives via bicycle to gently question Moran about the missing Susan. Moran denies any knowledge of her. That night, at the local Fun Fair, Sally Norton, is working at a sideshow, dancing the "hula-hula" to attract customers. When she takes a break, Jack Venner, who has fallen in love with her at first sight, introduces himself. But when the sideshow barker tries to drag Sally back to the show, Jack bests him in a fistfight, which costs Sally her job. Jack suggests that she see Moran about becoming an assistant to Moran's housekeeper, Margaret Santor. Moran gives Sally the job over the objections of Margaret.

After the suspicious Detective Inspector Brownlow questions Moran again about Susan's disappearance, Moran and Tanga extract more serum from the tree, although without a further sacrifice. Moran says that his English science can improve Tanga's juju, but Tanga is sceptical. Moran goes to London and picks up Judy. Tanga feeds her to the tree, too.

Moran offers Margaret"s job to Sally, telling her that Margaret is dead. Margaret and Moran had been lovers before he went to the Amazon. She still loved him, but Moran said that he was tired of her "middle aged jealousies" over the younger Sally, whom Margaret has correctly guessed that Moran is in love with. Moran strangled Margaret when she tried to stab him.

Sally tells Jack that she's frightened of Moran and will quit the next morning. But Moran refuses to let her go and confesses his love for her. Sally is appalled. Moran locks her in his laboratory. When Jack comes to find her, Moran tells him that she's left. Jack and Moran argue about Sally's whereabouts, and Jack goes to the police with his suspicions. The police have new evidence about Susan's disappearance – a torn shred of her dress found near Moran's house – and they and Jack go off to confront Moran.

In the laboratory, Moran brings Margaret back to life. She starts to attack Sally but drops dead before she can do Sally any harm. Moran ponders this, saying, "Only a body. No mind". Then he yells at Tanga, "Your people cheated me! They gave me only half the secret!" He can raise the dead, but the result is a mindless zombie. Tanga, hands on hips, says defiantly, "Our secret not for you. The brain for us only".

Tanga then tries to feed Sally to the tree but fails. Jack and the police arrive as Moran and Tanga struggle. Sally escapes with Jack. Moran hurls a vial of liquid onto the tree and, as it bursts into flames, flees. Tanga throws his knife, killing Moran, then kneels before the burning tree, worshipping it as it's consumed by fire.

== Cast ==
As listed in the end credits:

- George Coulouris as Dr Moran
- Robert MacKenzie as Lewis Carling
- Norman Claridge as Dr Paterson
- Marpessa Dawn as native girl
- Jimmy Vaughan as Tanga
- Sara Leighton as Susan Curtis
- Edward Higgins as Sgt Bolton [credited as Edward Higgings]
- Joyce Gregg as Mrs Santor
- Harry Ross as Bristow
- Vera Day as Sally
- Peter Wayn as Jack Venner
- Alexander Field as fair attendant
- Joy Webster as Judy
- David Lawton as man in club
- John Tinn as Lascar
- Maxwell Foster as Inspector Brownlow
- Peter Lewiston as Sgt Freeman
- Roger Avon as Constable

== Production ==
Womaneater was filmed at Twickenham Studios then in Middlesex (now Greater London) while some scenes were shot outside the studio. American film critic Bill Warren points out a sequence shot on the streets of London in which Moran goes "on the prowl" for another woman to feed to the tree. "The scenes were actually shot at night and seem to have been filmed from concealment with Coulouris and the young woman playing his prey [Joy Webster] moving through real crowds".

According to British film critic John Hamilton, there was a setback as production was about to begin: "the already tight budget was stretched to breaking-point by an accidental fire just before shooting started which reduced the original tree to cinders and left the prop department a matter of days to construct the unsatisfactory alternative".

Film historians Steve Chibnall and Brian McFarlane note that Coen "dismissed [the film] as 'rubbish'".

== Release ==
Womaneater was released in the UK in April 1958 on, according to Chibnall and McFarlane, an "unashamedly exploitative double bill with Blonde in Bondage", a Swedish crime drama from 1957. It was double-billed in the US in July 1959 with The H-Man, a 1958 Japanese science fiction film.

In the UK, Womaneater was given an X-certificate from the British Board of Film Censors (BBFC), which meant it could not be exhibited to people age 16 or younger. However, the film appears to have been promoted as a children's movie in the US: BoxOffice magazine recommended to exhibitors that they target the film to 'the kiddie matinee in larger houses or the smaller neighbourhoods and drive-ins that draw a large percentage of children'.

In September 1963, Screen Gems syndicated the film to American television stations as part of its "X" package of science fiction and horror films.

The film's release in the UK was handled by Eros Films and in the US by Columbia Pictures. It was released for home viewing in the US in a widescreen Region 1 DVD format from Image Entertainment in 2000.

== Critical reception ==
The Monthly Film Bulletin wrote: "Apart from an effective location sequence in night-time Piccadilly, the production is poor and the acting, if anything, worse; no even George Coulouris can do much with his stereotyped role, though he understandably emerges from the ordeal the least scathed. As for the plot the jolly little tale has not even novelty to offer: tree eats woman is almost history, though woman eats tree really would be news."

The Hollywood Reporter wrote: "A slow-paced entry that attempts ineffectually to generate more than moderate suspense it's strictly filler fare for secondary duals. ... Plot is decidedly synthetic. Coulouris does the best he can with the role, and Vera Day is attractive as the heroine. ... Screenplay by Brandon Fleming is minor league, direction by Charles Saunders slow and ponderous."

The Motion Picture Herald referred to it as "hardly the type of horror film that will have audiences screaming in the aisles".

Variety wrote: "This British import is an old-fashioned meller which even in England could not rise above the indiscriminate program market. For American audiences it's unable to overcome an old-hat plot carelessly put together. ... Coulouris is called upon for over-acting by Charles Saunders, whose direction generally is static. Vera Day, his co-star, is pretty as an employee in his home but has little to do but be terrified."

BoxOffice in its "Review Digest" rated the film as "very poor".

British critic Phil Hardy called Womaneater "an improbable shocker", writing that "the direction, acting and scripting are all questionable and totally lack the silliness required to get away with such a motif, best seen in Roger Corman's Little Shop of Horrors (1960) with its carnivorous piece of flora."

American critic Bryan Senn wrote: "Though the production is definitely on the cheap, director Charles Saunders makes the most of both the English countryside (often going outside to shoot to give the picture a more expansive – and authentic – feel) and the huge old manor house that stood in for Moran's mansion", he writes. He compliments the film's art director, Herbert Smith, for his "bang-up basement/dungeon lab set, its medieval-style stone staircase, pillars, dank walls and iron gates contrasting nicely with the tables of shining glass beakers and medical apparatus, generating an atmosphere of ominous menace".

BoxOffice's "Feature Review" in 1959 was unimpressed by the laboratory set with its "dark and dingy brick-walled basements and hundreds of bubbling or smoking test tubes and other similar laboratory paraphernalia"

Warren refers to the direction as "ponderous" and says it "makes a slow story painfully halting, in a point-by-point plodding technique of showing all actions".

In The Radio Times, David McGillivray gave the film one star, and wrote, "fans of mad scientists and killer vegetables should on no account miss this little-known Z-grade affair, a British studio's successful attempt to match similar trash that was coming out of Hollywood in the late 1950s ... Director Charles Saunders began his career with the charming wartime comedy Tawny Pipit and ended it with horror and cheap sleaze. Coulouris was in Citizen Kane. Their conversations in the studio canteen must have been particularly melancholic".

David Maine of PopMatters rated the film at 6/10 stars and called it "campy fun", while 389 voters at IMDb.com have given the film a score of 4.6/10.

Several critics has discussed the carnivorous tree and its victims which are at the centre of Womaneater. Author Jessica Page Morrell describes the tree as a "phallic monster comprisedof dozens of writhing snakes, and when a woman was tossed into its embrace, she would die, struggling and screaming in terror". Senn makes note of the "exploitative factor" of the movie, writing that Saunders employed "the occasional plant's-eye view shot to enhance the horror (as well as to provide an additional voyeuristic glimpse at the invariably luscious and semi-draped victim-to-be)". As Hamilton points out, though, "how the girls are actually killed or even more fundamental questions such as how an 8-foot killer tree escaped the attentions of HM Customs in the first place, are never allowed to get in the way of cheap thrills." Warren wrote: "this is one of the most misogynist movies I've ever seen. Beginning with the premise (it is clearly not a man-eating tree), right until the end, when Sally can't even leave the vault without the help of a man, almost everything in the film indicates if not a hatred of women, but at least a totally uncaring attitude. Women are beauty objects or things to be used and discarded, such as Margaret and the tree's victims".
