= Bill Nagy (actor) =

Canadian film and TV actor (1921–1973)

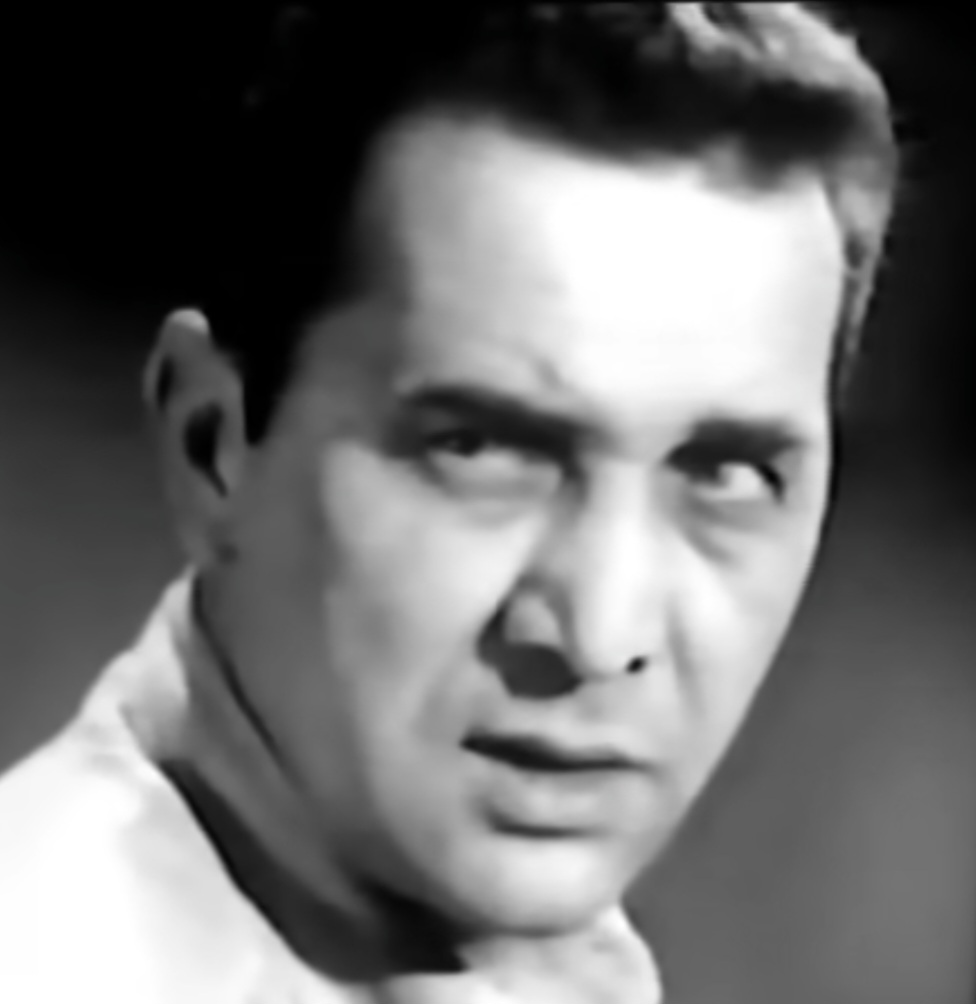
- Nagy in an episode of One Step Beyond (1961)
- Born: 21 February 1921; Budapest, Kingdom of Hungary
- Died: 19 January 1973 (aged 51); London, England
- Education: Actors Studio
- Occupation: Actor
- Years active: 1951–1973

William Nagy (21 February 1921–19 January 1973) was a Canadian actor, who lived and worked primarily in the United Kingdom.

== Life and career ==
Nagy was born in Budapest, Hungary in 1921. His family emigrated to Canada when he was a child, and he was brought up in Toronto. He originally trained as a ballroom dancer, and studied acting at the Actors Studio in New York City. He came to London in mid-1949 as Paul Muni's understudy in the first British production of Death of a Salesman. After the run ended, he chose to remain in England.

Nagy appeared in some 140 film and television roles between 1950 and 1973, typically as a token American or Canadian supporting character in British productions. In 1968 he appeared in The Trojan Tanker episode of the spy-fi series Department S. From 1967 to 1970, he played Gregg Flint on Coronation Street. His West End stage credits included "Stewpot" in South Pacific and Alvaro in The Rose Tattoo.

== Personal life ==
Nagy married actress Janet Macfarlane. Their daughter, Christina Nagy, was an actress.

=== Death ===
Nagy died in London on 19 January 1973, at the age of 51.

== Selected filmography ==
=== Film ===
- A Tale of Five Cities (1951) - G.I. at Table (uncredited)
- River Beat (1954) - Eddie
- Hands of Destiny (1954) - Captain Scott
- The Brain Machine (1955) - Charlie
- Shadow of a Man (1955) - Paul Bryant
- Joe MacBeth (1955) - Marty
- The Stolen Airliner (1955) - Luiz
- Cloak Without Dagger (1956) - Mario Oromonda
- Fire Maidens from Outer Space (1956) - U.S.Officer (uncredited)
- Assignment Redhead (1956) - Marzotti
- The Eternal Question (1956)
- High Tide at Noon (1957) - Sandy McNab (uncredited)
- Confess, Killer (1957) - John Digby
- Across the Bridge (1957) - Paul Scarff
- A King in New York (1957) - Television Announcer (uncredited)
- The Mark of the Hawk (1957) - Fred
- Man with a Gun (1958) - Joe Harris
- I Was Monty's Double (1958) - American Captain
- Dial 999 (TV series), ('Picture Puzzle', episode) (1959) - West
- First Man Into Space (1959) - Police Chief Wilson
- The Mouse That Roared (1959) - U.S. Policeman (uncredited)
- Bobbikins (1959) - Rogers - The Butler
- Our Man in Havana (1959) - Man at Blue Moon Club (uncredited)
- Never Take Sweets from a Stranger (1960) - Clarence Olderberry Jr
- The Boy Who Stole a Million (1960) - Police Chief
- Surprise Package (1960) - Johnny Stettina (uncredited)
- Transatlantic (1960) - Fabroni
- The Long Shadow (1961) - Garity
- Crosstrap (1962) - Gaunt
- The Road to Hong Kong (1962) - Agent (uncredited)
- The Longest Day (1962) - Major in Ste. Mère-Eglise (uncredited)
- Danger by My Side (1962) - Sam Warren
- Night of the Prowler (1962) - Paul Conrad
- The Girl Hunters (1963) - Georgie
- Goldfinger (1964) - Mr. Midnight
- Boy with a Flute (1964, Short)
- Those Magnificent Men in their Flying Machines (1965) - American Journalist (uncredited)
- Where the Spies Are (1966) - Aeradio
- A Countess from Hong Kong (1967) - Crawford
- You Only Live Twice (1967) - USAF General at Pentagon (uncredited)
- The Man Outside (1967) - Morehouse
- Battle Beneath the Earth (1967) - Col. Talbot Wilson
- The White Bus (1967)
- Subterfuge (1968) - Embassy Attache
- The Adding Machine (1969) - Lawyer
- The Revolutionary (1970) - Gansard
- Z.P.G. (1972) - The President
- Scorpio (1973) - The owner of the pet shop (uncredited) (final film role)

=== Television ===
- Overseas Press Club - Exclusive! (1957) - Pierre J. Huss
- The Adventures of Clint and Mac (1957) - Clint's Father
- Coronation Street (1961-1970) - Gregg Flint / Joe Baumgarten
- Sir Francis Drake (1962) - Corsia
- The Saint (1962-1964) - Tony Unciello / Joe Sholto / David Stern
- The Avengers (1963) - Johnson
- Crane (1964) - Venza
- Department S (1968) -Paolo Cortoli
- Never Mind the Quality, Feel the Width (1969) - Lyndon
- Madigan (1972) - Ross

== Bibliography ==
- Hare, William. Early Film Noir: Greed, Lust and Murder Hollywood Style. McFarland, 2010.
