= Fire Maidens from Outer Space =

1956 British film by Cy Roth

- Theatrical release poster
- Directed by: Cy Roth
- Screenplay by: Cy Roth
- Story by: Cy Roth
- Produced by: George Fowler; Cy Roth
- Starring: Anthony Dexter; Paul Carpenter; Susan Shaw; Harry Fowler; Sydney Tafler; Jacqueline Curtis; Rodney Diak
- Cinematography: Ian D. Struthers
- Edited by: Lito Carruthers
- Music by: Trevor Duncan
- Production company: Criterion Films
- Distributed by: Eros Films; Topaz Film Co.
- Release date: 6 September 1956
- Running time: 80 minutes
- Country: United Kingdom
- Language: English

Fire Maidens from Outer Space (or Fire Maidens of Outer Space in the US), is a 1956 British independent black-and-white science fiction feature film. It was written, produced and directed by American filmmaker Cy Roth as a collaboration between Cy Roth Productions and Great Britain's Criterion Films, and distributed in the UK by Eros Films and in the USA by Topaz Film Co. The film stars Anthony Dexter, Susan Shaw, Paul Carpenter and Jacqueline Curtis. There were 13 additional "fire maidens". The music score features cues excerpted from the opera Prince Igor by Alexander Borodin.

== Plot ==
The discovery of an Earth-like atmosphere on the 13th moon of Jupiter leads to the sending of a crew of five male astronauts, armed with handguns, to investigate. On the moon, they rescue Hestia, a beautiful girl, who is being attacked by a monster. They subsequently discover New Atlantis, a dying civilization, a remnant of the original Atlantis who escaped when that continent sank. There are only seventeen people left, all women save for a single elderly man, Prasus, whom the girls revere as "father". Prasus hopes the spacemen will stay and help him destroy the monster, which is a slender, male hominid creature, around six feet tall with dark, pitted skin, impervious to bullets, and described as a "man with the head of a beast".

Luther Blair learns from Hestia, however, that Prasus rules New Atlantis as a tyrant and wants to keep the earthmen there to mate with the girls. Duessa, one of the women, overhears Blair and Hestia conspiring to escape and encourages the other fire maidens to bind her and sacrifice her. The monster, which lurks outside the city's walls, breaks into the city and kills Prasus along with Duessa. It is killed by the earthmen, and the remaining women decide to let them return to Earth. Hestia returns with them, and the astronauts promise to send spaceships back with husbands for the rest.

== Cast ==
- Anthony Dexter as Luther Blair
- Susan Shaw as Hestia
- Paul Carpenter as Captain Larson
- Jacqueline Curtis as Duessa
- Harry Fowler as Sydney Stanhope
- Sydney Tafler as Dr Higgins
- Rodney Diak as Anderson
- Maya Koumani as Fire Maiden
- Owen Berry as Prasus
- Richard Walter as The Creature
- Norma Arnould as Fire Maiden
- Sylvia Burrows as Fire Maiden
- Ann Elsden as Fire Maiden
- Marcella Georgius as Fire Maiden
- Corinne Gray as Fire Maiden
- Gloria Haig as Fire Maiden
- Jan Holden as Fire Maiden
- Eunice Jebbett as Fire Maiden
- Sonia Martin as Fire Maiden
- Kim Parker as Fire Maiden
- Barbara Pinney as Fire Maiden
- Dinah Ann Rogers as Fire Maiden
- Bill Nagy as US Major (uncredited)

== Production ==
The Monthly Film Bulletin review credits Lito Carruthers as editor, and Scott MacGregor as assistant director. However, MacGregor is credited onscreen as production and art supervisor, John Pellatt receives screen credit as assistant director, and Lito Carruthers is credited as Lighting Cameraman (Director of Photography). Carruthers' contribution to the film has not been confirmed.

== Reception and reputation ==
In a contemporary review, The Monthly Film Bulletin stated: "Even the most dedicated connoisseurs of the artless are likely to find this British attempt at science-fiction something of a strain on their patience." Kine Weekly wrote: "Science fiction extravaganza, decorated with lightly clad damsels. ... Its story far exceeds the bounds of credibility, but tongue-in-the-cheek presentation only disarms criticism. ... The picture, staged on a very modest, not to say meagre, scale, is, despite the presence of the monster, more of a folk dance display than an outer space thriller. Anthony Dexter, imported from America, Susan Shaw, Harry Fowler, Paul Carpenter, Sydney Tafler and other well-known players do their best to pep up the fantastic script, but retire defeated. Les girls are definitely the film's main attraction."

From retrospective reviews, Halliwell's Film and Video Guide describes the film as "a strong contender for the title of the worst movie ever made, with diaphanously clad English gals striking embarrassed poses against cardboard sets".

In Phil Hardy's book Science Fiction (1984), a review described the film as "a bottom-of-the barrel piece of British Science Fiction", and that "the film's one claim to fame is its extensive use of classical music (mostly Borodin) as background music, a trick that Stanley Kubrick deployed with far more aplomb in 2001: A Space Odyssey".

The DVD Talk website stated Fire Maidens from Outer Space "may be among the worst-ever professionally produced science fiction films"

In November 1992, Fire Maidens of Outer Space was featured as an episode of the movie-mocking television show Mystery Science Theater 3000.

== See also ==
- List of 20th century films considered the worst

== Bibliography ==
- Hardy, Phil (1984). Science fiction. New York: Morrow. ISBN 978-1-8541-0382-6.
- Walker, John, ed. Halliwell's Film and Video Guide 2000. London: HarperCollins, 1999. ISBN 978-0-0627-3692-5.
- Warren, Bill. Keep Watching the Skies: American Science Fiction Films of the Fifties, 21st Century Edition. (Greatly expanded edition) Jefferson, North Carolina: McFarland & Company, 2009. ISBN 0-89950-032-3.
