= The Entertainer (1960 film) =

- Directed by: Tony Richardson
- Screenplay by: John Osborne; Nigel Kneale
- Based on: The Entertainer; 1957 play by John Osborne
- Produced by: Harry Saltzman
- Starring: Laurence Olivier; Brenda de Banzie; Roger Livesey; Joan Plowright; Daniel Massey
- Cinematography: Oswald Morris
- Edited by: Alan Osbiston
- Music by: John Addison
- Production company: Woodfall Film Productions
- Distributed by: Bryanston Films
- Release date: 25 July 1960
- Running time: 107 min
- Country: United Kingdom
- Language: English
- Budget: £247,716 or £240,170 or £205,870
- Box office: £57,323 (UK) (as at 31 Dec 1962)

The Entertainer is a 1960 British kitchen sink drama film directed by Tony Richardson, produced by Harry Saltzman and adapted by John Osborne and Nigel Kneale from Osborne's stage play of the same name. The film stars Laurence Olivier as Archie Rice, a failing third-rate music-hall stage performer who tries to keep his career going even as the music-hall tradition fades into history and his personal life falls apart. Olivier was nominated for the Academy Award for Best Actor.

== Plot ==
In 1956, Jean Rice, a young London art teacher, travels to a seaside resort to visit her family. She is emotionally confused, having had a row with her fiancé Graham, who wants her to emigrate with him to Africa. She also is deeply concerned about the Suez Crisis, having seen Mick, her soldier brother, go to the war. She has attended a peace rally in Trafalgar Square that was directed against prime minister Anthony Eden.

She finds that the resort has declined from its pre-war heyday and is now drawing waning crowds, despite being in midseason. The music-hall act of her father Archie Rice (Olivier) plays to a small number of increasingly uninterested spectators. Her family is deeply dysfunctional and her beloved grandfather Billy, once one of the leading stars of the music hall, lives in quiet retirement with Archie, Archie's second wife Phoebe and Archie's son Frank.

Jean goes to the theatre where her father is playing. As well as being an undischarged bankrupt and a semi-alcoholic, he is desperately short of money and is hounded by creditors—the income-tax people as well as his unpaid cast. He is adored by his cynical son Frank and watched with mild amusement by his father, but his relationship with Phoebe is strained. He is a womaniser, and she is well aware of his tendencies, openly commenting on them to the rest of the family. She is often found drinking heavily.

With his latest show drawing to a close, Archie is desperate to secure a new show for the winter season. While acting as master of ceremonies at a Miss Great Britain beauty contest, he charms Tina Lapford, the young woman who finished in second place. Soon he is involved in an affair with her. Her wealthy and ambitious parents want her to have an entertainment career and are willing to put up the money for Archie's new show, if it includes her. They shake hands on the deal.

While this is going on, the radio reports that Mick has been captured by the Egyptians at Suez after a major firefight. Archie seems oblivious of the news and the distress of his family. He is fixated with his dream of restarting his stalled career and his affair. Archie tells Jean of the affair and she then tells her grandfather. Acting out of what he believes are his son's best interests, and not knowing of the money for the next show, Billy goes to the girl's parents and tells them that Archie is already married and bankrupt. They swiftly break off all connection with him.

While Archie is still digesting this turn of events, news arrives that Mick has been killed by the Egyptians. Mick's body is returned and a civic commemoration is attended by the whole town. It is reported that he will be awarded a Victoria Cross for his actions. Archie is still too busy fixating on his career to notice how his family is falling apart at the news. His brother-in-law wants to help the family to relocate to Canada and help him run a hotel, but Archie rebuffs him. Instead he persuades an impresario to promote a new show, with his father, who is keen to amend for stopping the Lapford funding, as the headline attraction. Billy, despite his age, is still extremely popular, and there is a public demand for his return.

On the opening night, Billy collapses and dies just before he is due on stage, completing the estrangement of the family. Phoebe and Frank are determined to make a future for themselves in Canada, whereas Archie is determined to stay in Britain, even if it means going to jail. The film ends with Archie making an apparently final performance to an apathetic audience.

== Cast ==
- Laurence Olivier as Archie Rice
- Brenda de Banzie as Phoebe Rice
- Roger Livesey as Billy Rice
- Joan Plowright as Jean Rice
- Alan Bates as Frank Rice (his film debut)
- Daniel Massey as Graham, Jean's fiancé
- Shirley Anne Field as Tina Lapford
- Thora Hird as Mrs Lapford
- Albert Finney as Mick Rice (his film debut)
- Charles Gray as Columnist

== Production ==
The film was based on the play of the same name, written by British playwright John Osborne. The play was produced in 1957, and the first performance was given on 10 April 1957 at the Royal Court Theatre with Laurence Olivier in the leading role of Archie Rice. Osborne wrote the play at Olivier's request. The death of Archie's son, Mick Rice was based on the murder of Anthony Moorhouse during the 1956 Suez Crisis. Osborne's 1956 play Look Back in Anger was adapted into a film in 1959, directed by Tony Richardson, and starred Richard Burton in the leading role. Osborne, with Nigel Kneale, wrote the screenplay for the film.

Osborne then decided to adapt The Entertainer, and co-wrote it again with Kneale. Richardson again was assigned to direct the film, and Canadian producer Harry Saltzman produced it. Olivier reprised his role as Archie Rice, along with Brenda de Banzie, who played Phoebe, his hapless wife. They were the only members of the original cast to reprise their roles in the film adaptation, though Joan Plowright, who had replaced Dorothy Tutin when the stage production moved from the Royal Court to the West End, was once again cast as Archie's daughter Jean. Olivier, whose marriage to Vivien Leigh was disintegrating (they had married in 1940), went on to marry Plowright in March 1961.

Roger Livesey was cast as Archie's father Billy, despite being only one year older than Olivier. George Relph, the actor who originated the role in the play, died in April 1960.

This picture is Alan Bates' film debut. It is also Albert Finney's first film. Although Plowright is "introduced" in the credits, she had already appeared in two films: Moby Dick (1956) and Time Without Pity (1957).

A total of £45,000 of deferments was distributed to the key cast and crew. Osborne, Saltzman and Richardson received £5,000 each. Olivier received £20,000 against 17% of profits.

TCM's Felicia Feaster observes: "Tony Richardson (and fellow traveler, playwright John Osborne) typified this cinematic movement's trend for realism with an insistence on shooting on-location with natural sound and light." The insistence on realism caused budgetary problems. The film was budgeted at £193,000 but went over budget because of a variety of problems in production and post-production, including noise from seagulls in Morecambe.

In November 1959, The New York Times' Stephen Watts filed a substantial story from Stratford-upon-Avon in England, where Olivier was appearing in Shakespeare's Coriolanus and commuting to Morecambe, where The Entertainer was being filmed on location. Watts' story revealed that Olivier had two teeth filed to create Archie's distinctive gap, that late-season visitors who saw the display outside the Alhambra Theatre frequently asked to buy tickets and that many locals appeared in the film. Olivier also told Watts, "If at one time someone had offered me a job as a song-and-dance man in a seaside show, I'd have been glad to take it. I would have called myself Larry Oliver and been as happy as a lark."

According to the BFI, after the film was completed, Olivier said that he felt "like a modern actor again".

Years later, Richardson said in The Long-Distance Runner: An Autobiography: "I couldn't have articulated it, having never been introspective (but) "The Entertainer was a key moment in my development, because all the ideas and convictions I was to work with afterward were crystallized in its making." Of the character of Archie Rice, Richardson said he was "... the embodiment of a national mood... Archie was the future, the decline, the sourness, the ashes of old glory, where Britain was heading."

=== Filming location ===
It was filmed on location in the Lancashire seaside town of Morecambe.

== Release ==
=== Critical reception ===
The Entertainer was named one of 1960's ten best films by The New York Times' film critics.

Olivier was nominated for an Oscar for Best Actor in a Leading Role.

The New York Times' Bosley Crowther suggested that viewers see the film "[a]s an antidote to all the bromides about show people being lovely folk, amusing, courageous, soft-hearted and dedicated to spreading sunshine in the world.... 'The Entertainer' is a devastating picture of a hollow, hypocritical heel and of the pitiful people around him who are drowned in his grubby vanity.... Yet it works out to a fascinating picture, for one reason because of its superior illustrative performance and, for another, because of its striking mise en scène. Mr. Olivier is nothing short of brilliant.... Director Tony Richardson has imaged the cheapness of a seaside music hall, of grubby 'digs' and the midway surroundings in such a way as to have them all but smell...."

Rotten Tomatoes lists the film with a 79% "fresh rating" based on 14 reviews. On Metacritic, the film has a weighted average score of 70 out of 100 based on ten critics, indicating "generally favorable" reviews.

Leonard Maltin gives the film three and a half out of four stars: "Film captures flavor of chintzy seaside resort, complementing Olivier's brilliance as egotistical song-and-dance man.... Film debuts of Bates and Finney."

=== Box office ===
Despite the critical acclaim, the film was a box-office disappointment. TCM's Felicia Feaster observes: "Critics ... tended to either love or hate the film. And despite a remarkable performance, Olivier ultimately never achieved the stunning success and adoration with the cinematic version that he had enjoyed with the play."

== See also ==
- Angry young men
- Kitchen sink realism
- The Entertainer (play)
