= Hands of Destiny (1954 film) =

1954 British film by Tony Young

- Terence Alexander as Ranald's manager
- Directed by: Tony Young
- Written by: Josef Ranald
- Produced by: Tony Young
- Starring: Josef Ranald; Terence Alexander; Hilda Fenemore
- Cinematography: Philip Grindrod
- Edited by: Dorothy Stimson
- Music by: W.L. Trytel
- Production company: Grosvenor Films
- Distributed by: Adelphi Films
- Release date: 1954
- Running time: 62 minutes
- Country: United Kingdom
- Language: English

Hands of Destiny is a 1954 British second feature ('B') drama-documentary film directed by Tony Young and starring Josef Ranald, Terence Alexander and Hilda Fenemore. It was written by Ranald, produced by Grosvenor Films and distributed by Adelphi Films.

The film should not be confused with the 1941 American short film Hands of Destiny, also featuring Ranald, nor the 1954 Korean film The Hand of Destiny.

== Plot ==
In flashbacks, celebrity palm-reader Dr Josef Ranald re-enacts two of his previous cases. In the first, he convinces a suicidal woman that her hand foretells happiness, a prophecy that he claims was later proved true. In the next, Ranald claims to reunite a mother with her long-lost son, by scrutinising the hands of a young man. Between these episodes, Ranald's manager describes what the hand markings of Bob Hope, Joan Crawford, Olivia de Havilland, Adolf Hitler and Hermann Goering reveal about their owners.

== Cast ==
- Josef Ranald as himself
- Terence Alexander as Ranald's manager
- Hilda Fenemore as Mrs Kane
- Asta Bredigand as girl
- Richard Burrell as Arthur Reed
- Benedicta Leigh as Ellen Langley
- Wendy Danielli as nurse
- Bill Nagy as Captain Scott

== Production ==
It was made at Kay Carlton Hill Studios, St. John's Wood, London.

== Reception ==
The Monthly Film Bulletin wrote: "A would-be semi-documentary, illustrating the work of a chiromancer. Dr. Ranald's absence from the scenes in his office suggests that the two dramatised incidents of the suicide and the long-lost child – in both of which he does appear – were originally made independently, and later linked by the rather tedious office scencs. The subject itself is interesting; but sequences such as the parade of the hands of thirteen Nazi war leaders become very boring, and the two stories are unconvincing and inconclusive. The dialogue throughout is remarkably inept and unlikely, and the direction barely competent. Dr. Ranald himself has a likeable personality."

Kine Weekly wrote: "Unusual oftering introducing Josef Ranald, the celebrated palmist. It is split into four parts – two take the form of playlets and the rest are devoled to hand readings of the famous and the infamous. But all are too wise after the event to support adequately Ranald's view that palmistry is an exact science. The acting and technical resentation, too, leave much to be desired and further limit the picture's appeal. ... The "star," Josef Ranald, obviously has quite a reputation as a mind reader, and two dramatic cameos illustrate his skill af solving human problems merely by looking at the palms of the persons concerned, but neither convinces. The palms of headline personalities, ranging from Hitler to Bob Hope, are also analysed, but no new information is revealed. Completely lacking in showmanship, the hocus pocus is unlikly to intrigue other than the gullible."

The Daily Film Renter wrote: "Unusual support for popular audiences."

In British Sound Films: The Studio Years 1928–1959 David Quinlan rated the film as "poor", writing: "tedious semi-documentary."

In The British 'B' Film Steve Chibnall and Brian McFarlane called the film "esoteric", stating "To-Day's Cinema commented that the two dramatised episodes from the doctor's casebook were 'presented so artificially as to delight sceptics and embarrass converts'".
