= Lito Carruthers =

British film editor

Lito R. A. Carruthers (née Moschonas, later Pike, 3 March 1913 – ) was a Greek-British film editor.

== Selected filmography ==
- Madonna of the Seven Moons (1945)
- Latin Quarter (1945)
- The Echo Murders (1945)
- Temptation Harbour (1947)
- Daughter of Darkness (1948)
- Obsession (1949)
- Valley of Eagles (1951)
- My Wife's Lodger (1952)
- My Death Is a Mockery (1952)
- Is Your Honeymoon Really Necessary? (1953)
- Conflict of Wings (1954)
- A Yank in Ermine (1955)
- Fire Maidens from Outer Space (1956)
- Battle of the V-1 (1958)
- Life in Emergency Ward 10 (1959)
- And the Same to You (1960)
- Too Hot to Handle (1960)
