= Rodney Diak =

British actor (1924–2007)

- Rodney Diak in Mogul 1966
- Born: June 15, 1924
- Died: October 6, 2007 (aged 83)

Rodney Diak (15 June 1924 – 6 October 2007) was a British film, television, and theater actor

He was well known for a string of hit performances on the West End, including Goodnight Mrs. Puffin and Busybody.

== Career ==
Rodney Diak was born as David Rodney Diak in Harrow, England. He made his West End theater debut with Michael Redgrave and the Old Vic Company in Shakespeare's "Love's Labours Lost" at the New Theater at the age of 24. He also appeared in She Stoops to Conquer with the Old Vic Company. In 1951, Diak appeared on stage in Twelfth Night in front of an audience which included Queen Elizabeth II and Princess Margaret. Princess Margaret remarked about Diak after the performance, "That's the most handsome actor in Britain."

One of Diak's most successful performances was his turn in Goodnight Mrs. Puffin, which ran for 691 performances. His career continued with another success with the play Busybody, which debuted in 1964. He continued to appear in a number of stage roles later in his career including The Secretary Bird, Private Lives, The Boy Friend, and My Cousin Rachel.

Diak's film career yielded mixed results at first. He was reportedly horrified to learn that his first feature film debut movie would be Fire Maidens from Outer Space (1956) after signing a contract with MGM Studios. Diak's career improved after appearing in Dunkirk (1958) opposite actors John Mills and Richard Attenborough. Diak also had smaller roles in Mr. Topaze (1961) with Peter Sellers and The Flesh and Blood Show (1972). He also starred in several BBC television series including Z-Cars, Barlow at Large, The Troubleshooters and People Like Us. He had a cameo role in Carry On Admiral.

== Filmography ==
- Fire Maidens from Outer Space (1956) - Anderson
- Dunkirk (1958) - Pannet
- The Flesh and Blood Show (1972) - Warner

== Death ==
Rodney Diak died on 6 October 2007 in London from cancer, aged 83.
