= Basil Dignam =

English actor (1905–1979)

- Dignam in The Prisoner: Checkmate (1967)
- Born: Basil Martin Dignam; 24 October 1905; Sheffield, West Riding of Yorkshire, England
- Died: 31 January 1979 (aged 73); Westminster, London, England
- Occupation: Actor
- Years active: 1938–1978
- Spouse: Mona Washbourne (1940–1979) (his death)

Basil Dignam (24 October 1905 – 31 January 1979) was an English actor.

== Early life ==
Dignam was born in Sheffield, West Riding of Yorkshire. Before acting, he tried many jobs, from working as a company clerk to a journalist.

== Career ==
Dignam acted on film and television between 1948 and 1978. He often appeared as an authority figure, such as Mr Justice Poynter in Crown Court, as a police officer, army general or peer. His television appearances included The Prisoner: Checkmate (1967) and The Champions (1968), as Sir Frederick in episode 2 "The Invisible Man".

== Personal life ==
Dignam was married to actress Mona Washbourne from 1940 until his death in 1979. His brother Mark Dignam was also a professional actor. Basil Dignam died, aged 73, in Westminster, London.

== Selected filmography ==
- Maytime in Mayfair (1949) – Commissionaire (uncredited)
- Smart Alec (1951) – Defending Counsel
- Two on the Tiles (1951) – Ship's Captain
- The Lady with a Lamp (1951)
- Appointment with Venus (1951) – R.A.M.C. Captain
- His Excellency (1952) – Security Officer
- Hammer the Toff (1952) – Superintendent
- There Was a Young Lady (1953)
- Carrington V.C. (1954)
- The Quatermass Xperiment (1955) – Sir Lionel Dean (uncredited)
- They Can't Hang Me (1955) – Wing Commander Riddle
- Touch and Go (1955) – Stevens
- The Narrowing Circle (1956) – George Pacey
- Private's Progress (1956) – Col. Martin (uncredited)
- Port of Escape (1956) – Det. Insp. Crawford
- The Intimate Stranger (1956) – Dr. Gray
- Reach for the Sky (1956) – Air Ministry Doctor (uncredited)
- The Weapon (1956) – (uncredited)
- The Counterfeit Plan (1957) – Police Commissioner
- You Pay Your Money (1957) – Currie
- Brothers in Law (1957) – Mr. Justice Emery
- Yangtse Incident: The Story of H.M.S. Amethyst (1957) – Sir Lionel Henry Lamb, British Ambassador at Nanking
- Man in the Shadow (1957) – Bit Part (uncredited)
- Three Sundays to Live (1957) – Davitt
- The Depraved (1957) – Tom Wilton
- Son of a Stranger (1957) – Dr. Delaney
- The Safecracker (1958) – Air Vice Marshal
- Them Nice Americans – Inspector Adams
- Innocent Sinners (1958) – Mr. Dyson – Olivia's Solicitor (uncredited)
- Up the Creek (1958) – Coombes
- The Spaniard's Curse (1958) – Guy Stevenson (uncredited)
- A Cry from the Streets (1958) – Police Inspector (uncredited)
- Carry On Sergeant (1958) – Third Specialist
- Further Up the Creek (1958) – Flagship Commander
- I Only Arsked! (1958) – (uncredited)
- Corridors of Blood (1958) – Chairman
- Room at the Top (1959) – Priest (uncredited)
- Carlton-Browne of the F.O. (1959) – Security Officer
- Sapphire (1959) – Doctor Burgess (uncredited)
- I'm All Right Jack (1959) – Minister of Labour
- A Touch of Larceny (1959) – Lt. Cmdr. Evans at P.R.O. (uncredited)
- The Spider's Web (1960) – Hugo
- Suspect (1960) – Dr Childs
- The Pure Hell of St Trinian's (1960) – Army Officer
- Sentenced for Life (1960) – Ralph Thompson
- Gorgo (1961) – Admiral Brooks
- The Secret Partner (1961) – Lyle
- The Fourth Square (1961) - Inspector Forbes
- The Court Martial of Major Keller (1961) – Morrell
- Fate Takes a Hand (1961) – Wheeler
- Life for Ruth (1962) – Lawyer Mapleton
- Lawrence of Arabia (1962) – Cavalry General at Field Briefing (uncredited)
- Seven Seas to Calais (1962) – Sir Francis Walsingham
- Master Spy (1963) – Richard Horton
- Heavens Above! (1963) – Prison Governor
- 80,000 Suspects (1963) – Medical Officer Boswell
- Ring of Spies (1964) – 2nd Member at Lord's (uncredited)
- Joey Boy (1965) – General
- The Amorous Adventures of Moll Flanders (1965) – Lawyer
- Rotten to the Core (1965) – The General
- Where the Spies Are (1965) – Major Harding
- Naked Evil (1966) – Jim Benson
- The Jokers (1967) – Bank Manager
- Cuckoo Patrol (1967) – Snodgrass
- I'll Never Forget What's'isname (1967)
- Assignment K (1968) – Howlett
- Twisted Nerve (1968) – Doctor
- Laughter in the Dark (1969) – Dealer
- Battle of Britain (1969) – Tactical Records Officer (uncredited)
- The Great White Hope (1970) – English Official (uncredited)
- 10 Rillington Place (1971) – Medical Board
- Persuasion (1971) - Sir Walter Elliot
- A Lizard in a Woman's Skin (1971) – The Commissioner (uncredited)
- Young Winston (1972) – Joseph Chamberlain
- Soft Beds, Hard Battles (1974) – Brigadier
- Edward the Seventh (1975) - Prime Minister Asquith
