= Vera Day =

English actress (born 1933)

- Born: 4 August 1933 (age 93); Forest Gate, Essex, England
- Occupation: Actress
- Years active: 1954–2007
- Spouse(s): Arthur Mason (m. 1954; div. 1961) Terry O'Neill (m. 1963; div. 1976)
- Children: 2

Vera Day (born 4 August 1933) is an English film and television actress. She was born and grew up in Forest Gate, Essex (now part of the London Borough of Newham).

== Early career ==
Leaving school at 15, Day had various jobs before finding employment in a hair salon. Posing for hairstylists, she became a full-time model.

One day she saw an advertisement in a theatrical paper for showgirls, so taking time off work and with the smallest bikini she could find, she attended the auditions. Even though she was untrained in singing and dancing, she caught the attention of Jack Hylton, who gave her a part in Wish You Were Here at the London Casino in 1953, when she was only 19. Val Guest was at the opening night, and left a note for her at the stage door to contact him. This led to Day being cast in the film Dance Little Lady. However, she had to ask permission from Hylton, as she was under contract for two more shows, which ended up being Pal Joey at the Princes Theatre and Jokers Wild with the Crazy Gang at the Victoria Palace Theatre.

== Film career ==
From the late 1950s, Day appeared in British films, a glamorous blonde bombshell in the Stanley Baker drama Hell Drivers (1957) and the Hammer science fiction film Quatermass 2 (1957). Her other film roles include that of George Cole's girlfriend in Mario Zampi's comedy Too Many Crooks (1959) and as the heroine in the horror film Womaneater (1958), one of her few leading parts.

Many years later, Day appeared in a supporting role in Guy Ritchie's Lock, Stock and Two Smoking Barrels (1998).

== Selected filmography ==
- Dance Little Lady (1954)
- The Crowded Day (1954)
- It's a Great Day (1955)
- A Kid for Two Farthings (1955)
- Fun at St. Fanny's (1955)
- Quatermass 2 (1957)
- Hell Drivers (1957)
- The Prince and the Showgirl (1957)
- I Was Monty's Double (1958) – Angela
- The Woman Eater (1958)
- Up the Creek (1958) – Lily
- Them Nice Americans (1958) – Ann Adams
- The Haunted Strangler (1958) – Pearl
- Too Many Crooks (1959) – Charmaine
- And the Same to You (1960) – Cynthia Tripp
- Trouble with Eve (1960) – Daisy Freeman
- The Trunk (1961) – Diane
- Watch It, Sailor! (1961) – Shirley Hornett
- A Stitch in Time (1963) – Betty
- Saturday Night Out (1964) – Arlene
- Lock, Stock and Two Smoking Barrels (1998) – Tanya
- The Riddle (2007) – Sadie Miller
