= Chico the Rainmaker =

1974 British children's film serial by Jonathan Ingrams

The Boy with Two Heads
- Opening titles
- Directed by: Jonathan Ingrams
- Screenplay by: C.M. Pennington-Richards
- Produced by: Frank Godwin
- Starring: Spencer Plumridge; Leslie Ash; Hilda Fenemore
- Cinematography: Neil Binney
- Edited by: Richard Mason
- Music by: Harry Robinson
- Production company: Eyeline Films
- Release date: 1974
- Running time: 15 minutes (per episode)
- Country: United Kingdom
- Language: English

Chico the Rainmaker (also known as The Boy with Two Heads) is a 1974 British seven-part serial film directed by Jonathan Ingrams starring Spencer Plumridge, Leslie Ash and Hilda Fenemore. It was written by C.M. Pennington-Richards and made by Eyeline Films for the Children's Film Foundation.

Two children discover a South American shrunken head with magical powers.

== Plot ==
A boy named Chris Page finds a decorated box at a local antiques shop that contains an eerie shrunken head. He and his sister Jill, inadvertently play a special series of notes on a flute and call the head magically to life. It reveals itself to be Chicopacobacowana, a 2000 yr-old tribal witch doctor from the jungles of the Amazon. He is vital to the tribe both as protector and because he is their rainmaker. He has been making the rains for 2000 years however for the past three years, his people have been suffering from a drought.

'Chico' had been taken from the jungle by explorers three years previously, and had been awaiting an opportunity to return to his tribe ever since. The shrunken head along with some other artifacts had been inadvertently sold as part of a lot to a local antiques shop owner who just wanted to buy an old lawnmower. The shrunken head is being sought by an art dealer who knows it to be priceless.

Two thieves who had earlier attempted to burgle the antique shop, learn of a cash reward that Thornton is offering for Chico, and they attempt to capture him. The series centres on the children's adventures as they try to help Chico get home to South America while evading Thornton and the thieves.

== Episodes ==
It was "A Serial in Seven Episodes" with each episode approximately 15 minutes in length.

1. The Mysterious Box
2. Chico makes magic
3. Chase for Chico
4. The Magic Football
5. The Secret Cave
6. Chico makes the Rain
7. Farewell to Chico

== Cast ==
- Spencer Plumridge as Chris Page
- Leslie Ash as Jill Page
- Hilda Fenemore as Hilda Page
- Peter Halliday as Mr. Page
- Stanley Meadows as Douglas
- Lance Percival as Stanley Thornton
- Louis Mansi as Desmond
- Clive Revill as Chico (voice)
- Alex Mackenzie as the All-Father (hair)

== Theme song ==
At the end of each episode, the words to the theme song would be shown so you could sing along.

Chico Chico the rainmaker,

Chico Chico the rainmaker, Chico Chico the rainmaker,

Chico Paco Baca Wana make the rain!

Chico I'm such a little fella,

When I'm around you better get your umbrella,

As I start to sway and my eyes go flash,

The heavens open wide with a mighty crash!

== Release ==
It was shown in 1974 on PBS in the US, and shown in British cinemas in the 1970s and 1980s as part of their "Saturday Matinees".

It was also shown on television in the Maritimes as a 7-part serial in the mid-1970s on Saturday afternoons.
