= Port of Escape =

1956 British film by Tony Young

- Australian daybill poster
- Directed by: Tony Young
- Screenplay by: Barbara S. Harper; Tony Young; Abby Mann (additional scenes)
- Based on: short story Safe Harbour by Barbara S. Harper
- Produced by: Lance Comfort
- Starring: Googie Withers; John McCallum; Bill Kerr; Joan Hickson
- Cinematography: Phil Grindrod
- Edited by: Peter Pitt
- Music by: Bretton Byrd
- Production company: Wellington Films
- Distributed by: Renown Pictures Corporation (UK)
- Release date: May 1956 (UK)
- Running time: 76 minutes
- Country: United Kingdom
- Language: English

Port of Escape is a 1956 British thriller film directed by Tony Young and starring Googie Withers, John McCallum, Bill Kerr and Joan Hickson. The screenplay was by Barbara S. Harper and Young based on a short story by Harper.

== Plot ==
Two sailors, Australian Mitchell Gillis and American Dinty Missouri, are kicked off their ship when it docks in London. Missouri has amnesia and is prone to explosions of anger. They get involved in a fight outside a dockside pub that leads to a man's death. They go on the run and hide on a barge that belongs to three women. The two men plan to travel to Missouri, Dinty's home state, but not all goes to plan.

== Cast ==
- Googie Withers as Anne Stirling
- John McCallum as Mitchell Gillis
- Bill Kerr as Dinty Missouri
- Joan Hickson as Rosalie Watchett
- Wendy Danielli as Daphne Stirling
- Hugh Pryse as Skinner
- Alexander Gauge as Inspector Levins
- Ingeborg von Kusserow as Lucy
- Ewan Roberts as Sergeant Rutherford
- Basil Dignam as Det. Sgt. Crawford
- George Rose as publican

Hugh Pryse died in 1955, nine months before the film was released.

== Critical reception ==
The Monthly Film Bulletin wrote: "Although this melodrama is, in its modest way, respectably made, the direction is rather slack and the tension unevenly sustained. The playing is passable, with Bill Kerr making a brave attempt at the part of Dinty. Alexander Gauge brings a hefty authority to the role of a police inspector."

Kine Weekly wrote: "The picture tackles its plot from a psychological angle but too much is left in the air, even though gunplay and the chase are introduced. Googie Withers acts with easy confidence and John McCallum seizes most of his chances, but all the same they make an incongruous couple as Anne and Mitchell, Bill Kerr has his moments as Dinty, and the rest are adequate. Moreover, the finale is showmanlike, and the exteriors impress."

Allen Eyles at the Radio Times gives the film three out of five stars and writes that "The skilled performances of John McCallum and Googie Withers, and an atmospheric treatment of the London Docks setting, give this modest melodrama a considerable lift. ... An obscure director, Anthony Young, lets the pace slacken occasionally, but overall this is an intelligent and offbeat work that deserves to be better known, and probably owes much to its producer, Lance Comfort, an able director in his own right."
