= Phil Grindrod =

British cinematographer (1907–1967)

Phil Grindrod born 1907, died 1967 was a British cinematographer.

== Selected filmography ==
- The Indiscretions of Eve (1932)
- His Wife's Mother (1932)
- A Southern Maid (1933)
- The Great Defender (1934)
- Love at Second Sight (1934)
- Give Us the Moon (1944)
- I'll Be Your Sweetheart (1945)
- George in Civvy Street (1946)
- This Man Is Mine (1946)
- Dusty Bates (1947)
- The Clouded Crystal (1948)
- A Boy, a Girl and a Bike (1949)
- My Wife's Lodger (1952)
- My Death Is a Mockery (1952)
- Is Your Honeymoon Really Necessary? (1953)
- Confession (1955)
- Port of Escape (1956)
- The Key Man (1957)
- The Diplomatic Corpse (1958)
- Violent Moment (1959)
- A Question of Suspense (1961)
- The Telegoons (1963)
