= Sara Leighton =

English society portrait painter and actress (1934–2025)

Sara Leighton (née Shirley Maureen Ida Loraine; 12 April 1934 – 15 August 2025), also known as Shirley Lorimer, was an English society portrait painter and actress.

== Life and work ==
Leighton was born as Shirley Loraine in Camberwell, Surrey on 12 April 1934, the sister of actress Carole Lorimer. Her ambition was to become a painter since she was old enough to hold a brush and this she pursued under the tutelage of Pietro Annigoni. She stated that 'Annigoni gave me the heart to fight for a career when the cards of my sex, youth and country of origin were neatly stacked against me... he was a strict disciplinarian.' In her youth she acted in television and film roles under both the names Shirley Lorimer and Sara Leighton.

Leighton quickly found considerable success in portrait painting, becoming highly sought after by rich and influential society figures who were eager for her to paint their likeness. One of her most famous commissions was the Queen Mother. Leighton stated that she was also her favourite subject 'something goes on when she enters a room... the Queen Mother is genuinely so kind and has a way of making you feel you are the important one, not her.' Helen Cathcart, the Queen Mother's biographer noted that 'preparing a fresco, a younger artist, Sara Leighton, preferred to eschew formal sittings and was permitted to follow the Queen Mother with a sketchbook,' One of these sketches was later made into a popular limited edition print, published by the House of Questa, London in an edition of 2,500.

1963 saw Leighton establishing the company London Portrait's LTD in order to administer the increasing demand for her work. The following year, Leighton was badly injured in a car accident near Tunbridge Wells, receiving facial injuries and leg fractures. Also involved in the accident was Keith Waters her husband and the famous American female bullfighter Sandra Landry who had flown to England to have her portrait painted by Leighton.

In November 1971 it was reported in the Toledo Blade that Muhammad Ali was to have his portrait painted by Leighton, however according to the Boca Raton News in October 1981, Leighton declined his request as well as that of Elizabeth Taylor. She justified the reasons for her decision, stating 'when I paint I must have total concentration. Although they would make lovely subjects, I can not paint in a three-ring circus. There was too much activity around them at the time I was propositioned to paint.'

In 1972, Leighton travelled to South America in search of the Jaguar, the resulting painting being donated to the Royal Society for the Prevention of Cruelty to Animals. The painting Storm over the Veldt was donated to the Worldlife Fund on its 10th anniversary, with the proceeds from reproduction rights going to the fund.

In the mid-1970s Leighton lived in Bahrain, taking a flat in the National Bank of Bahrain Building, Manama, overlooking the then Dhow harbour.

Leighton was also controversially outspoken in regards to her sex, rejecting the rising feminist discourse prevalent at the time. In 1962, aged 26, she founded (perhaps satirically) The Society for the Protection of Utter Femininity. The society's aims were to encourage women to give up the vote and stop trying to compete with men in business - she quipped to the press, 'A woman should stay in the home...my ex-husband agrees with me.' She later stated that "Chopin was right when he said that all creative energy is sexual. He was writing a letter and he said something like: 'and when I think my darling, of how many sonatas I have poured into you.' That's why I don't think there have been great women painters."

Leighton was also famed for her beauty, Pietro Annigoni once labelling her 'the most beautiful woman in the world'. The British newsreader Jan Leeming recalled 'I thought salvation, or an answer to my dilemma would come in the shape of a job in the north of England. I'd been to an audition for a news reading position with Granada Television in Manchester. I vividly remember walking into a room where other hopefuls were sitting. My heart sank when I looked at one stunningly beautiful woman and thought I hadn't got a chance. She was a painter called Sara Leighton, who went on to relative acclaim. To my surprise, she didn't get the job, I did. I can only think it was because I already had experience of news reading and the others hadn't.'

In 1973 it was reported that Leighton had bought a 40-room monastery in Tuscany, Italy and intended to turn it into a sanctuary for writers, musicians, artists, as paying guests.

Leighton increasingly became a media personality, appearing regularly on talk and panel shows including Parkinson, which brought with it her fair share of press attention.

1980 saw Leighton publish her autobiography titled Of Savages and Kings, which recounts her adventures around the world with the diverse and interesting people that were part of her exciting life. She recalls her encounters with many of her clients and friends including Lord Olivier, The Prince of Wales, Muhammad Ali, Sheikh Yamani, Gloria Swanson, Pietro Annigoni, Sir Roger Moore, Jean Rook, David Niven, Shirley Bassey, Joan Collins, Queen Elizabeth The Queen Mother, The Princess Royal and the Beaverbrook family.

In the early 1980s, Leighton met Surrey-based musical instruments businessman Michael Cowan. They married in Westminster in 1987.

Leighton's work is scarce, owing to the majority being commissioned portraits still in the possession of the patrons. In November 2005, Female clown on trapeze - a pencil and watercolour drawing - and one of the few works to appear on the market, sold at Christie's, King Street London for £384.

== Death ==
Leighton died on 15 August 2025, at the age of 91. Her funeral was held in Worthing, West Sussex, on 11 September 2025.

== Exhibitions ==
- 1979 – Dreamscapes and Paintings - The Medici Gallery, London
- 1981 – Sara Leighton: Dreamscapes - Patricia Judith Art Gallery, Boca Raton USA
- 1987 – Sara Leighton: Eternal Beauty - Patricia Judith Art Gallery, Boca Raton USA
- 1988 – Sara Leighton: Dreamscapes - The Mensing Gallery, Germany
- 1996 – Sara Leighton: Exhibition of Paintings, Heals, London
- 2015 – Sara Leighton: Dreams and Reflections, the A@D Gallery, London

== Books ==
=== Illustrated by Sara Leighton ===
- Hayes, Walter. Angelica: The Bewitching Witch (1968)

=== Written by Sara Leighton ===
- Leighton, Sara. Of Savages and Kings (Bachman and Turner, 1980)

=== Written and illustrated by Sara Leighton ===
- The Naughty Greedy Pandamoth ( The Book Guild 2015 )

== Film and television ==
=== Credited as Shirley Lorimer ===
- You Know What Sailors Are (1954) – Jasmin
- Up to His Neck (1954) (uncredited) – Fanny
- No Place for Jennifer (1950) – Georgie Bishop
- Anne of Green Gables (1952) – Anne Shirley
- Brighton Rock (1948) (uncredited) – Shirley
- Quality Street (1947) – Isabella

=== Credited as Sara Leighton ===
- The Woman Eater (1958)
- Dial 999 (2 episodes, 1959)
- The Dickie Henderson Half-Hour (1 episode, 1958)

== Other sources ==
- They Call Me Psychic Sara, Prediction (February, 1959)
