= Stand by to Shoot =

1953 British television series

Stand by to Shoot was a British television serial which aired in 1953 on the BBC, written by Donald Wilson and produced by Dennis Vance. It was set at a film studio. The series was broadcast live in six episodes, none of which is believed to have been recorded.

== Scheduling ==
The first episode aired on a schedule which also included the film Road Show, children's series Whirligig, newsreels, and an outside broadcast on the making of cricket bats. The final episode aired on a schedule which also included cricket, athletics, The Appleyards, and newsreels.
