= Peter Lawford =

British actor (1923–1984)

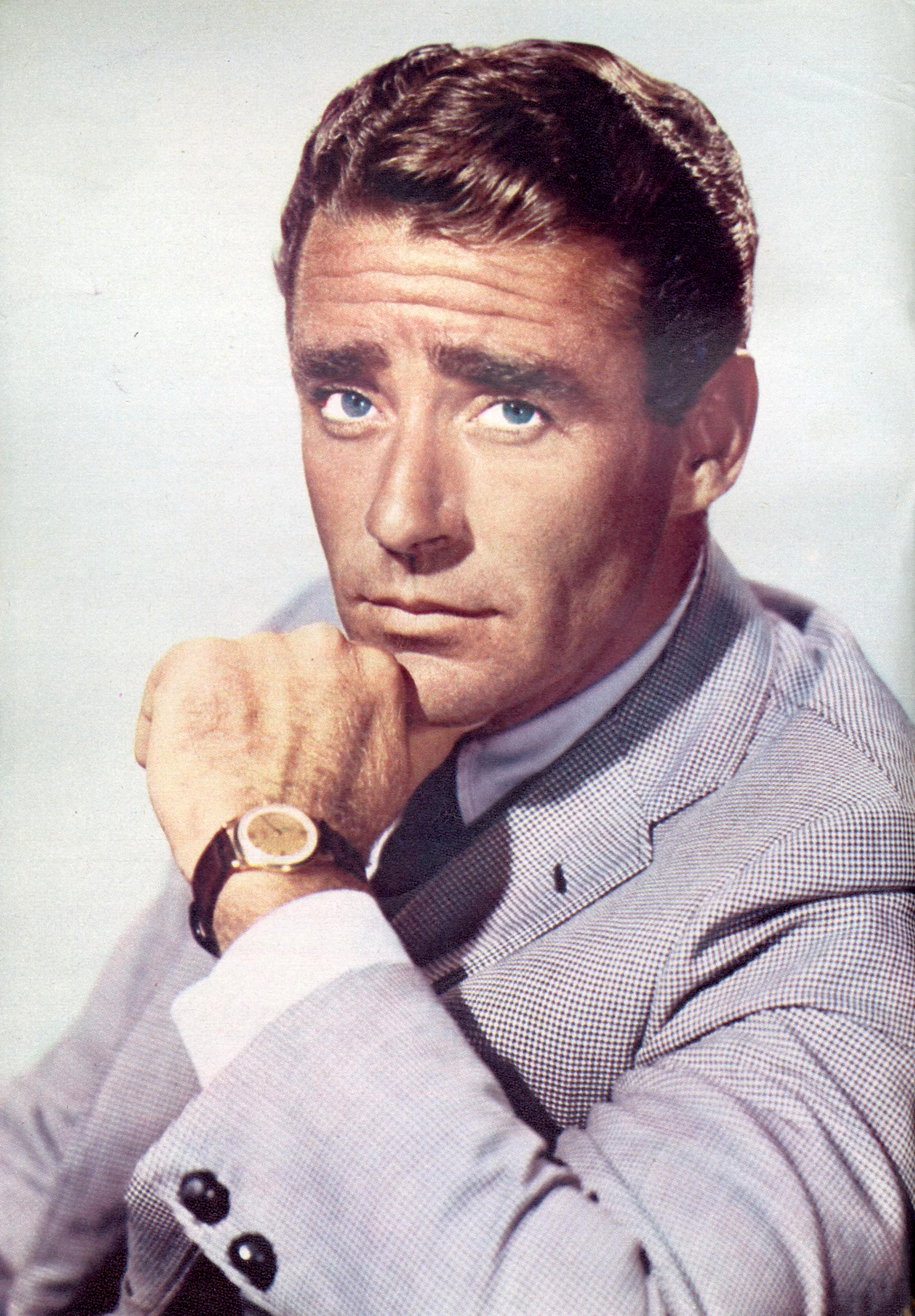
- Lawford c. 1954
- Born: Peter Sydney Ernest Aylen; 7 September 1923; London, England
- Died: 24 December 1984 (aged 61); Los Angeles, California, US
- Citizenship: United Kingdom; United States
- Occupation: Actor
- Years active: 1930–1984
- Spouses: Patricia Kennedy (m. 1954; div. 1966); Mary Rowan (m. 1971; div. 1975); Deborah Gould (m. 1976; div. 1977); Patricia Seaton (m. 1984)
- Children: 4, including Christopher Lawford
- Father: Sydney Turing Barlow Lawford

Peter Sydney Ernest Lawford (né Aylen; 7 September 1923 – 24 December 1984) was an English-American actor.

He was a member of the "Rat Pack" and the brother-in-law of U.S. president John F. Kennedy and senators Robert F. Kennedy and Edward Kennedy. From the 1940s to the 1960s, he was a well-known celebrity and starred in a number of highly acclaimed films. In later years, he was noted more for his off-screen activities as a celebrity than for his acting; it was said that he became "famous for being famous".

== Early life ==
Born in London in 1923, Lawford was the only child of Lieutenant General Sir Sydney Turing Barlow Lawford, KBE (1865–1953) and May Sommerville Bunny (1883–1972). At the time of his birth, his mother was married to Lieutenant Colonel Dr. Ernest Vaughn Aylen DSO, one of Sir Sydney's officers, while his father was married to Muriel Williams. At the time, May and Ernest Aylen were living apart. May confessed to Aylen that the child was not his, a revelation that resulted in a double divorce. Sydney and May wed in September 1924 after their divorces were finalised and when their son was one year old.

Lawford's family was connected to the British aristocracy through his uncle Ernest Lawford's wife (a daughter of the Scottish 14th Earl of Eglinton) as well as his aunt Ethel Turner Lawford (who married a son of the 1st Baron Avebury). His aunt, Jessie Bruce Lawford, another of his father's sisters, was the second wife of the Hon Hartley Williams, senior puisne judge of the Supreme Court of the colony of Victoria, Australia. A relative, through his mother, was Australian artist Rupert Bunny.

=== Early childhood ===
He spent his early childhood in France and, owing to his family's travels, was never formally educated. Instead, he was schooled by governesses and tutors, and his education included tennis and ballet lessons.

"In the beginning," his mother observed, "he had no homework. When he was older he had Spanish, German and music added to his studies. He read only selected books: English fairy stories, English and French classics; no crime stories. Having studied Peter for so long, I decided he was quite unfitted for any career except art, so I cut Latin, Algebra, high mathematics and substituted dramatics instead."

Because of the widely varying national and religious backgrounds of his tutors, Lawford "attended various services in churches, cathedrals, synagogues and for some time was an usher in a Christian Science Sunday School...."

Around 1930, aged seven, he made his acting debut in the English film Poor Old Bill. He also had an uncredited bit in A Gentleman of Paris (1931).

=== Accident ===
At the age of 14, Lawford severely injured his right arm in an accident when it went through a glass door. Irreversible nerve damage severely compromised the use of his forearm and hand, which he later learned to conceal. The injury resulted in his being unable to follow a military career as his parents had hoped. Instead, Lawford pursued a career as an actor, a decision that resulted in one of his aunts refusing to leave him her considerable fortune, as she had originally planned.

== Career ==
=== Early career ===
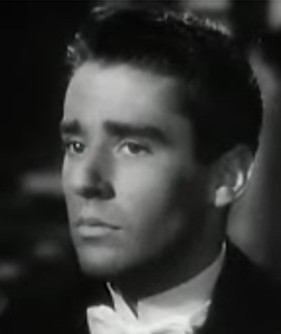
Lawford in The Picture of Dorian Gray (1945)

In 1938, Lawford was travelling through Hollywood when he was spotted by a talent scout. He was screen tested and made his Hollywood debut in a minor part in the film Lord Jeff starring Freddie Bartholomew.

Lawford and his family were living in Florida at the start of World War II, resulting in their assets, which were in Britain at the time, being frozen. He took a job parking cars and saved enough money to return to Hollywood, where he worked as a theatre usher until he began to get film work.

=== Extra work and bit parts ===
The advent of World War II saw an increase in British war stories and Lawford found himself in demand playing military personnel, albeit usually in uncredited parts. He is briefly seen in Mrs. Miniver (1942) and Eagle Squadron (1942), both times as pilots.

Lawford's first featured role in a major film production was in A Yank at Eton (1942), starring Mickey Rooney, in which Lawford played a snobbish bully. It was very popular at the box office.

Lawford was a cadet in Thunder Birds: Soldiers of the Air (1942) and Junior Army (1942) (starring Bartholomew), a soldier in Random Harvest (1942), Immortal Sergeant (1942), and London Blackout Murders (1943) (directed by George Sherman), and a navigator in Assignment in Brittany (1943). He had a billed part in The Purple V (1943).

At Metro-Goldwyn-Mayer, Lawford appeared as a student in Above Suspicion (1943), a soldier in Pilot #5 (1943), a naval commander in The Sky's the Limit (1943) (with Fred Astaire), and an Australian in The Man from Down Under (1943). He had a minor role at Republic's Someone to Remember (1943) and The West Side Kid (1943), the latter directed by Sherman.

Lawford played a soldier in Sahara (1943) and sailors in Sherlock Holmes Faces Death (1943) and Corvette K-225 (1943). He was a Frenchman in Paris After Dark (1943) and Flesh and Fantasy (1943), and was a student in MGM's Girl Crazy (1943) and The Adventures of Mark Twain (1944).

=== Metro-Goldwyn-Mayer ===
Though he had been appearing in small roles at MGM, Lawford's career stepped up a notch when he was signed to a long-term contract with the studio in June 1943. MGM signed him with a specific role in mind: The White Cliffs of Dover (1944), in which he played a young soldier during the Second World War.

Lawford had a small role in The Canterville Ghost (1944) and Mrs. Parkington (1944), playing a suitor of Greer Garson. MGM gave him another important role in The Picture of Dorian Gray (1945).

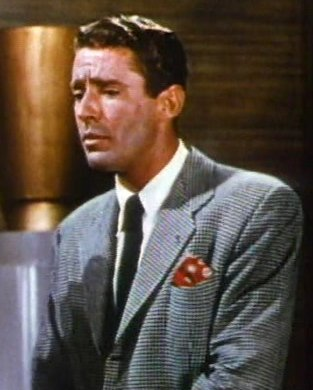
Lawford In Royal Wedding (1951)

Lawford's first leading role came in Son of Lassie (1945), a big hit. According to Filmink "Metro used Lawford mostly in one of two ways. First, as a handsome male prop for female stars in musicals" and "second male lead in supporting bigger stars, playing best friends, love rivals, etc."

Lawford appeared in a Kathryn Grayson-June Allyson musical, Two Sisters from Boston (1946). At 20th Century-Fox, Ernst Lubitsch cast him in Cluny Brown (1946) where he was billed after Charles Boyer and Jennifer Jones. He won a Modern Screen magazine readers' poll as the most popular actor in Hollywood of 1946. His fan mail jumped to thousands of letters a week. With actors such as Clark Gable and James Stewart away at war, Lawford was recognised as a new romantic lead on the MGM lot.

Lawford starred in My Brother Talks to Horses (1947) along with Jackie Butch Jenkins. The film was an early work of Fred Zinnemann and was a box office disappointment. Lawford was reunited with Grayson in It Happened in Brooklyn (1947), which also starred Frank Sinatra. Lawford received rave reviews for his work in the film, while Sinatra's were lukewarm.

Lawford later admitted that the most terrifying experience of his career was the first musical number he performed in Good News (1947), the film musical he starred in alongside Allyson. He was lauded for the role in which he used an American accent.

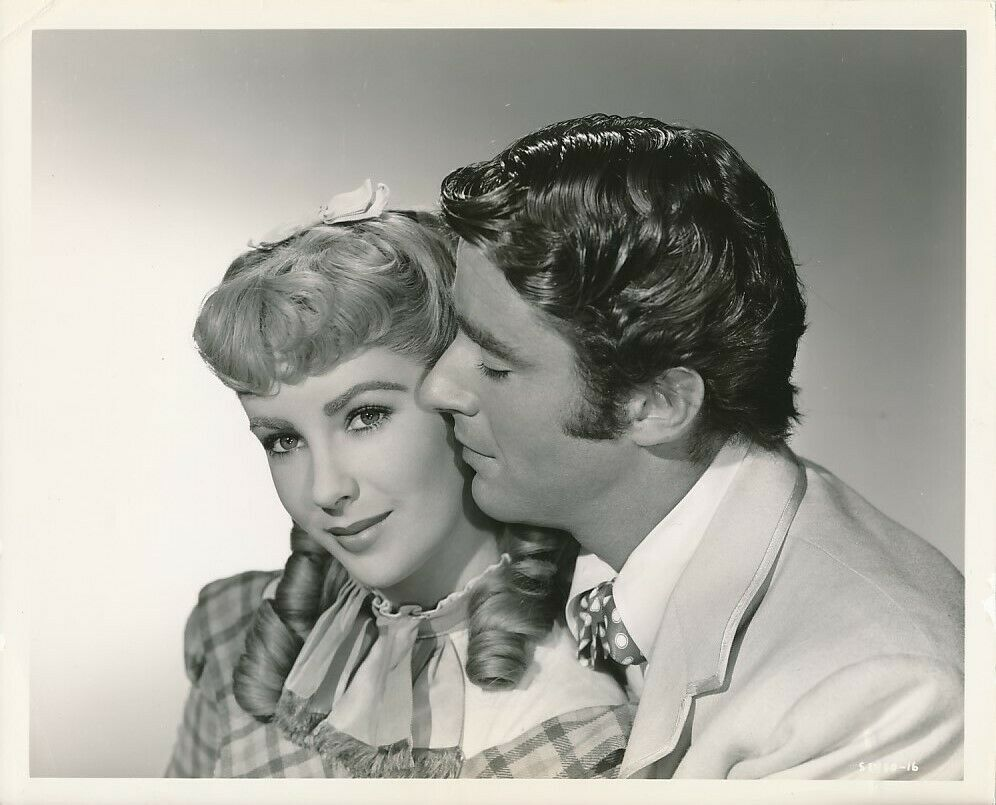
Peter Lawford and Elizabeth Taylor on the promote shoot of Little Women (1949)

He was Esther Williams' leading man in On an Island with You (1948) and supported Fred Astaire and Judy Garland in Easter Parade (1948), a major hit, and Greer Garson and Walter Pidgeon in Julia Misbehaves (1948).

In 1949, Lawford portrayed Laurie in MGM's version of Little Women (1949) alongside Allyson and Elizabeth Taylor. He was billed beneath Pidgeon and Ethel Barrymore in the anti-Communist The Red Danube (1949) and was one of Deborah Kerr's leading men in Please Believe Me (1950). Lawford was Jane Powell's love interest in Royal Wedding (1951) with Fred Astaire and co-starred with Janet Leigh in Just This Once (1952). It has been argued that Lawford's career suffered from the departure of Louis B. Mayer from MGM in 1951 as Mayer was replaced by Dore Schary who did not use Lawford as well.

Fox borrowed him for Kangaroo (1952), a melodrama shot in Australia with Maureen O'Hara. Reviewing this film, Filmink argued that "Lawford is a wet fish actor who could never really hold the screen in a heroic part (he was generally better as a leading man for a female star, or a second lead to a more charismatic male star)." But in Lawford’s defense, his character is totally emasculated in Kangaroo" from what it was in the original script.

Back at MGM, Lawford was top billed in some B films: You for Me (1953), a comedy, The Hour of 13 (1953), a thriller, and Rogue's March (1953), a war film. At this point, in an effort to economize, MGM released Lawford and several other major stars and featured players from their contracts.

Lawford's first film after leaving MGM was the Columbia Pictures romantic comedy, It Should Happen to You (1954), directed by George Cukor. Lawford starred alongside Judy Holliday and Jack Lemmon, in his first major film role.

=== Television ===
Lawford focused on television, guest starring on shows like General Electric Theater, Schlitz Playhouse, and The Ford Television Theatre. In 1954, Lawford married Patricia Kennedy, sister of Senator John F. Kennedy. Lawford would become an enthusiastic fundraiser for the Senator.

Lawford had a regular role on a TV sitcom, Dear Phoebe (1954–55) but the show only ran 32 episodes. When it ended he resumed guest starring on shows like Alfred Hitchcock Presents, Jane Wyman Presents The Fireside Theatre, Screen Directors Playhouse, Schlitz Playhouse again, Playhouse 90, Producers' Showcase (a version of Ruggles of Red Gap), several episodes of Studio 57, Climax! and Goodyear Theatre.

Lawford had another starring role on a TV series, The Thin Man (1957–59) with Phyllis Kirk, an NBC series from MGM based on the novel by Dashiell Hammett. It was more successful, running for 72 episodes.

=== Frank Sinatra and the Rat Pack ===
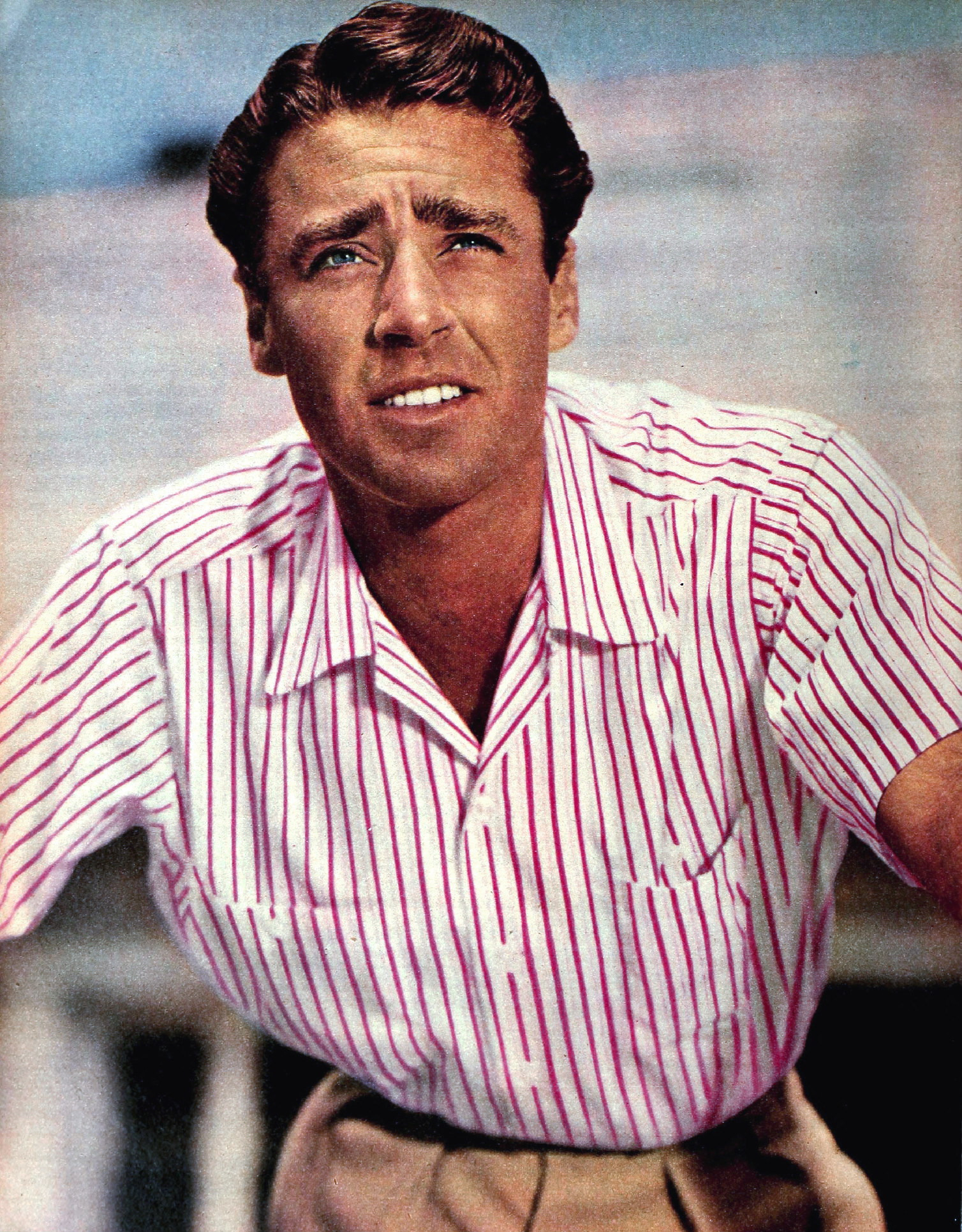
Lawford in 1955

In 1959, Sinatra invited Lawford to join the "Rat Pack" and also got him a role in Never So Few (1959). Peter Lawford and Sinatra appeared in Oceans 11 (1960). Lawford had been first told of the basic story of the film by director Gilbert Kay, who heard the idea from a gas station attendant. Lawford eventually bought the rights in 1958, imagining William Holden in the lead. Sinatra became interested in the idea, and a variety of writers worked on the project.

Lawford played a British soldier in the acclaimed Israeli-set drama Exodus (1960) for Otto Preminger and had a cameo in Pepe (1960). In 1960, he became a U.S. citizen and assisted on his brother-in-law's successful presidential election.

He did a TV remake of The Farmer's Daughter (1962) with Lee Remick and was reunited with the Rat Pack in Sergeants 3 (1962).

Lawford played a Senator in Advise & Consent (1962) for Preminger and was Lord Lovat in The Longest Day (1962), a war film with a star-studded cast.

=== Producer ===
In 1961, Lawford and his manager Milt Ebbins formed Chrislaw Productions, which was named after Peter's son Christopher. It signed a three-year deal with United Artists to make three features and two TV series for $10 million. William Asher was to be executive producer. Their first project was to be a remake of the old silent film The Great Train Robbery. Half a million dollars instead went toward the 1963 action film Johnny Cool starring Henry Silva and Elizabeth Montgomery. It also made the TV series The Patty Duke Show.

Lawford was Bette Davis's leading man in Dead Ringer (1964) and guest starred on The Alfred Hitchcock Hour, Profiles in Courage (as General Alexander William Doniphan), Bob Hope Presents the Chrysler Theatre and Run for Your Life. He went on to produce the Patty Duke film Billie (1965) and had supporting roles in two Carroll Baker movies, playing her fiancé both times: Sylvia (1965) and Harlow (1965).

By this time, Lawford had fallen out with Sinatra — who replaced him in Robin and the 7 Hoods (1964) with Bing Crosby — but Sammy Davis Jr. remained loyal and got Lawford a supporting role in A Man Called Adam (1966). He played a washed-up film star in The Oscar (1966). He and Patricia Kennedy divorced in 1966.

He guest-starred on shows like The Wild Wild West and I Spy and was in How I Spent My Summer Vacation (1967).

Lawford went to Europe to star in Dead Run (1967) and The Fourth Wall (1968). He was a popular guest star on TV comedy and game shows.

He produced a film starring himself and Davis, Salt and Pepper (1968), and had support roles in Skidoo (1968) for Preminger, Buona Sera, Mrs. Campbell (1968), Hook, Line & Sinker (1969) with Jerry Lewis, and The April Fools (1969).

Salt and Pepper was popular enough for Lawford to raise money for a sequel, One More Time (1970) directed by Lewis. He supported George Hamilton in Togetherness (1970) and guest-starred several times on Rowan & Martin's Laugh-In. In 1971, he married Rowan's daughter Mary.

=== Later career ===
Lawford's later films included A Step Out of Line (1971), Clay Pigeon (1971), and The Deadly Hunt (1971). He had the lead role in Ellery Queen: Don't Look Behind You and guest starred on Bewitched. In 1971 he appeared as Ben Hunter on The Men From Shiloh (rebranded name for The Virginian) in the episode titled "The Town Killer." He had a semi recurring role in The Doris Day Show (1971–72) and even directed an episode.

He returned to MGM for They Only Kill Their Masters (1972), which reunited him with former MGM contract players June Allyson and Ann Rutherford.

Lawford was in The Phantom of Hollywood (1974), the pilot for Born Free, Rosebud (1975) for Preminger, Won Ton Ton: The Dog Who Saved Hollywood (1976), Hawaii Five-O, Fantasy Island, The Love Boat, Angels' Brigade (1979), Highcliffe Manor, Supertrain, Mysterious Island of Beautiful Women (1979), Gypsy Angels (1980), Body and Soul (1981), and episodes of The Jeffersons. His last role was as Montague Chippendale in Where Is Parsifal? (1983).

== Personal life ==
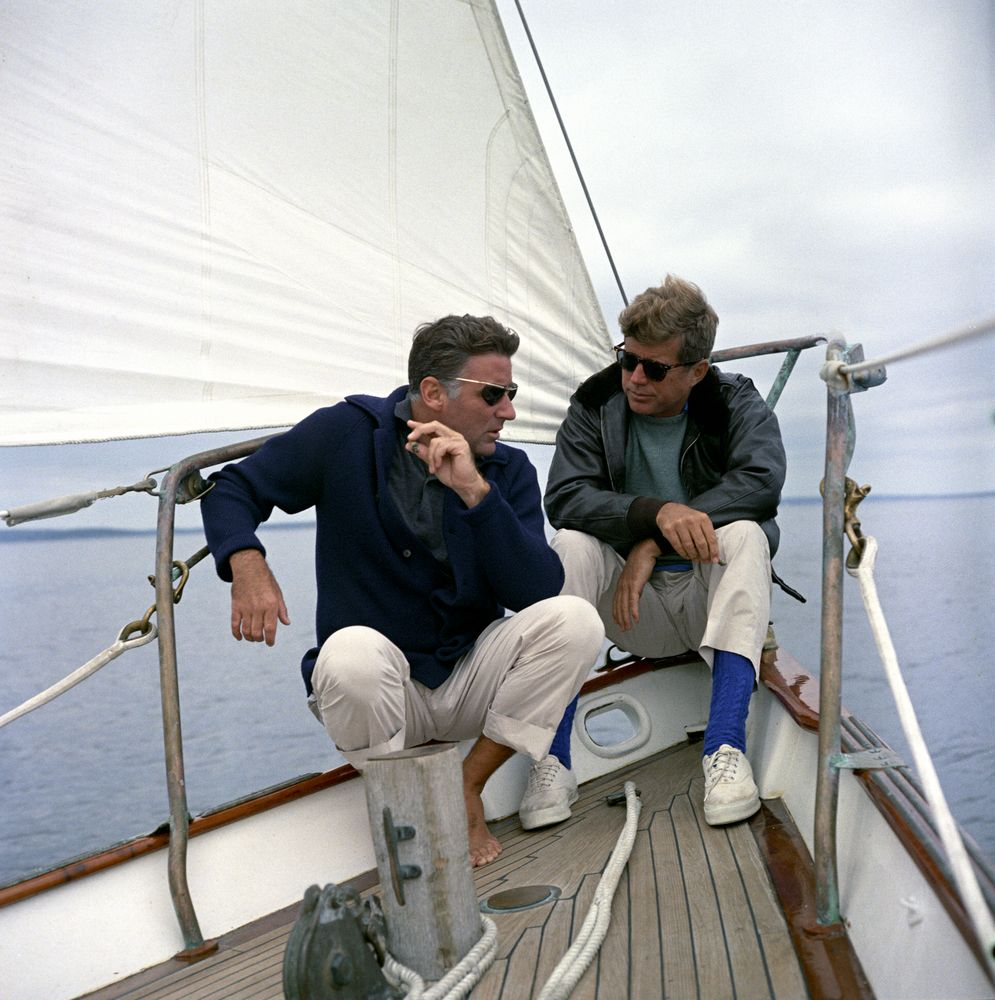
Lawford sailing with his brother-in-law President John F. Kennedy aboard the yacht Manitou, a former USCG training vessel that was used as a "floating White House", off the coast of Johns Island, Maine, 12 August 1962

His first marriage, in 1954, was to socialite Patricia Kennedy, the younger daughter of Kennedy family patriarch Joseph P. Kennedy Sr. and matriarch Rose Kennedy, also a younger sister of John F. Kennedy, then a Democratic U.S. senator from Massachusetts. They had four children: a son, actor and author Christopher Lawford (1955−2018), and daughters Sydney Maleia Lawford (b. 1956), Victoria Francis Lawford (b. 1958), and Robin Elizabeth Lawford (b. 1961).

Lawford became a U.S. citizen on 23 April 1960, in time to vote for his brother-in-law in the upcoming presidential election. Lawford, along with other members of the "Rat Pack", helped campaign for Kennedy and the Democratic Party. Sinatra famously dubbed him "Brother-in-Lawford" at this time. Lawford and Patricia Kennedy divorced in February 1966.

Lawford was originally cast as Alan A. Dale in the film Robin and the 7 Hoods but was replaced by Bing Crosby following a break in Frank Sinatra's relationship with Lawford. The break stemmed from a scheduled visit to Sinatra's home by Lawford's brother-in-law, President Kennedy, during a 1962 West Coast trip. Attorney General Robert F. Kennedy, who had long been concerned about Sinatra's rumoured ties with underworld figures, encouraged the president to change his plans and stay at Crosby's home, which (it was maintained) could provide better security for the president. The change came at the last minute, after Sinatra had made extensive arrangements for the promised and eagerly awaited presidential visit, including the construction of a helipad, which he later destroyed in a fit of rage. Sinatra was furious, believing that Lawford had failed to intercede with the Kennedys on his behalf, and banished him from the Rat Pack.

Sinatra and Lawford's friendship was over. They only spoke when Sinatra called after his son Frank Sinatra Jr. was kidnapped on 8 December 1963 and needed the help of Lawford's brother-in-law Robert F. Kennedy, then attorney general. With the exception of Pat Brown in his unsuccessful re-election as governor of California in 1966 and Vice President Hubert H. Humphrey's run for the presidency in the 1968 United States presidential election, Sinatra never endorsed another Democratic candidate. Crosby, a staunch Republican, was cast in Lawford's role.

Lawford married his second wife, Mary Rowan, daughter of comedian Dan Rowan, in October 1971. Rowan and Lawford separated two years later and divorced in January 1975.

Between marriages, Lawford dated Jill St. John and Priscilla Presley.

In June 1976 he married aspiring actress Deborah Gould, whom he had known for three weeks. Lawford and Gould separated two months after marrying and divorced in 1977. Following the divorce, Lawford moved into the Sierra Towers where he lived for the next few years on the 30th floor. During his separation from Gould, Lawford met Patricia Seaton who became his fourth and final wife in July 1984, just months before his death.

== Death ==
Lawford died at Cedars-Sinai Medical Center in Los Angeles on Christmas Eve 1984, aged 61, from cardiac arrest. He suffered from kidney failure and liver failure after years of substance abuse. His body was cremated, and his ashes were interred at Westwood Village Memorial Park Cemetery. Owing to a dispute between his widow and the cemetery, Lawford's ashes were removed from the cemetery in 1988 and scattered into the Pacific Ocean off the coast of California by his widow Patricia Seaton Lawford, who invited the National Enquirer tabloid to photograph the event.

For his contribution to the television industry, Peter Lawford has a star on the Hollywood Walk of Fame located at 6920 Hollywood Boulevard.

A plaque bearing Lawford's name was erected at Westwood Village Memorial Park.

== Filmography ==
Film
| Year | Title | Role | Notes |
|---|---|---|---|
| 1930 | Poor Old Bill | Horace | |
| 1931 | A Gentleman of Paris | Child | uncredited |
| 1938 | Lord Jeff | Benny Potter | |
| 1942 | Mrs. Miniver | Pilot | uncredited |
| 1942 | Eagle Squadron | Pilot | |
| 1942 | A Yank at Eton | Ronnie Kenvil | |
| 1942 | Thunder Birds | English Cadet | uncredited alternative title: Soldiers of the Air |
| 1942 | Junior Army | Cadet Wilbur | |
| 1942 | Random Harvest | Soldier | uncredited |
| 1943 | Immortal Sergeant | Soldier | uncredited |
| 1943 | London Blackout Murders | Percy, Soldier on Train | uncredited |
| 1943 | Assignment in Brittany | Navigator | uncredited |
| 1943 | The Purple V | Roger | |
| 1943 | Flesh and Fantasy | Pierrot (Episode 1) | uncredited |
| 1943 | Above Suspicion | Student | uncredited |
| 1943 | Pilot No. 5 | British Soldier | uncredited |
| 1943 | The Sky's the Limit | Naval Commander | uncredited |
| 1943 | The Man from Down Under | Mr. Jones | uncredited |
| 1943 | Someone to Remember | Joe Downes | alternative title: Gallant Thoroughbred |
| 1943 | The West Side Kid | Jerry Winston | |
| 1943 | Sahara | British soldier | uncredited |
| 1943 | Sherlock Holmes Faces Death | Young Sailor at Bar | uncredited |
| 1943 | Corvette K-225 | Naval Officer | uncredited |
| 1943 | Paris After Dark | Frenchman | uncredited |
| 1943 | Girl Crazy | Student | uncredited |
| 1944 | The Adventures of Mark Twain | Young Oxford Celebrant | uncredited |
| 1944 | The White Cliffs of Dover | John Ashwood II as a Young Man | |
| 1944 | The Canterville Ghost | Anthony de Canterville | |
| 1944 | Mrs. Parkington | Lord Thornley | |
| 1945 | The Picture of Dorian Gray | David Stone | |
| 1945 | Son of Lassie | Joe Carraclough | |
| 1945 | Ziegfeld Follies | Porky in "Number Please" | voice, uncredited |
| 1945 | Perfect Strangers | Introduction – USA Version | uncredited alternative title: Vacation from Marriage |
| 1946 | Two Sisters from Boston | Lawrence Tyburn Patterson Jr. | |
| 1946 | Cluny Brown | Andrew Carmel | |
| 1947 | My Brother Talks to Horses | John S. Penrose | |
| 1947 | It Happened in Brooklyn | Jamie Shellgrove | |
| 1947 | Good News | Tommy Marlowe | |
| 1948 | On an Island with You | Lieutenant Lawrence Y. Kingslee | |
| 1948 | Easter Parade | Jonathan Harrow III | |
| 1948 | Julia Misbehaves | Ritchie Lorgan | |
| 1949 | Little Women | Theodore "Laurie" Laurence | |
| 1949 | The Red Danube | Major John "Twingo" McPhimister | |
| 1950 | Please Believe Me | Jeremy Taylor | |
| 1951 | Royal Wedding | Lord John Brindale | alternative title: Wedding Bells |
| 1952 | Just This Once | Mark MacLene IV | |
| 1952 | Kangaroo | Richard Connor | alternative title: The Australian Story |
| 1952 | You for Me | Tony Brown | |
| 1952 | The Hour of 13 | Nicholas Revel | |
| 1953 | Rogue's March | Captain Dion Lenbridge / Private Harry Simms | |
| 1954 | It Should Happen to You | Evan Adams III | |
| 1956 | Sincerely, Willis Wayde | Willis Wayde | |
| 1959 | Never So Few | Captain Grey Travis | alternative title: Campaign Burma |
| 1960 | Ocean's 11 | Jimmy Foster | |
| 1960 | Exodus | Major Caldwell | |
| 1960 | Pepe | Himself | |
| 1962 | Sergeants 3 | Sergeant Larry Barrett | |
| 1962 | Advise & Consent | Senator Lafe Smith | |
| 1962 | The Longest Day | Brigadier Lord Lovat | |
| 1963 | Johnny Cool | – | executive producer |
| 1964 | Dead Ringer | Tony Collins | alternative title: Dead Image |
| 1965 | Sylvia | Frederic Summers | |
| 1965 | Harlow | Paul Bern | |
| 1965 | Billie | – | executive producer |
| 1966 | The Oscar | Steve Marks | |
| 1966 | A Man Called Adam | Manny | |
| 1967 | Dead Run | Stephen Daine | alternative titles: Deux Billets pour Mexico, Geheimnisse in goldenen Nylons, Segreti che scottano |
| 1968 | Walls Of Sin | Papá Baroni | alternative titles: Quarta parete, La Limite du péché |
| 1968 | Salt and Pepper | Christopher Pepper | executive producer |
| 1968 | Buona Sera, Mrs. Campbell | Justin Young | |
| 1968 | Skidoo | Senator Humble | |
| 1969 | Hook, Line & Sinker | Dr. Scott Carter | |
| 1969 | The April Fools | Ted Gunther | |
| 1970 | One More Time | Christopher Pepper / Lord Sydney Pepper | executive producer |
| 1970 | Togetherness | Prince Solomon Justiani | |
| 1971 | Clay Pigeon | Government Agent | Alternative title: Trip to Kill |
| 1972 | They Only Kill Their Masters | Lee Campbell | |
| 1974 | That's Entertainment! | Himself, Co-Host | |
| 1975 | Rosebud | Lord Carter | |
| 1976 | Won Ton Ton, the Dog Who Saved Hollywood | Slapstick Star | |
| 1979 | Angels Revenge | Burke | alternative title: Angels' Brigade; Seven from Heaven |
| 1980 | Gypsy Angels | | |
| 1981 | Body and Soul | Big Man | |
| 1983 | Where Is Parsifal? | Montague Chippendale | final film role |

Television
| Year | Title | Role | Notes |
|---|---|---|---|
| 1953 | General Electric Theater | John | episode: "Woman's World" |
| 1953–1954 | The Ford Television Theatre | Various roles | 3 episodes |
| 1954–1955 | Dear Phoebe | Bill Hastings | 32 episodes |
| 1954–1957 | Schlitz Playhouse of Stars | Various roles | 3 episodes |
| 1955 | The Jane Wyman Show | Stephen | episode: "Stephen and Publius Cyrus" |
| 1955 | Alfred Hitchcock Presents | Charles 'Charlie' Ffolliot Raymond | Season 1 Episode 9: "The Long Shot" |
| 1955 | Screen Directors Playhouse | Tom Macy | episode: "Tom and Jerry" |
| 1956 | Playhouse 90 | Willis Wayde | episode: "Sincerely, Willis Wade" |
| 1956–1957 | Studio 57 | Various roles | 2 episodes |
| 1957 | Producers' Showcase | Lord Brinstead | episode: "Ruggles of Red Gap" |
| 1957 | Climax! | Tom Welles | episode: "Bait for the Tiger" |
| 1957–1959 | The Thin Man | Nick Charles | 72 episodes |
| 1958 | The Bob Cummings Show | Himself | episode: "Bob Judges a Beauty Pageant" |
| 1959 | Goodyear Theatre | Major John Marshall | episode: "Point of Impact" |
| 1961 | The Jack Benny Program | Lord Milbeck | episode: "English Sketch" |
| 1962 | Theatre '62 | Glen Morley | episode: "The Farmer's Daughter" |
| 1965 | The Alfred Hitchcock Hour | Ernest 'Ernie' Mullett | Season 3 Episode 12: "Crimson Witness" |
| 1965 | Profiles in Courage | General Alexander William Doniphan | episode: "General Alexander William Doniphan" |
| 1965 | Bob Hope Presents the Chrysler Theatre | Lieutenant Philip Cannon | episode: "March From Camp Tyler" |
| 1966 | Run for Your Life | Larry Carter | episode: "Carnival Ends at Midnight" |
| 1966 | The Wild Wild West | Carl Jackson | episode: "The Night of The Returning Dead" |
| 1967 | How I Spent My Summer Vacation | Ned Pine | television movie |
| 1967 | I Spy | Hackaby | episode: "Get Thee to a Nunnery" |
| 1968 | The Carol Burnett Show | Self | Episode: "Peter Lawford and Minnie Pearl" |
| 1971 | A Step Out of Line | Art Stoyer | television movie |
| 1971 | The Virginian | Ben Hunter | episode: "The Town Killer" |
| 1971 | Ellery Queen: Don't Look Behind You | Ellery Queen | television movie |
| 1971–1973 | The Doris Day Show | Dr. Peter Lawrence | 8 episodes |
| 1972 | Bewitched | Harrison Woolcott | episode: "Serena's Richcraft" |
| 1974 | The Phantom of Hollywood | Roger Cross | television movie |
| 1974 | Born Free | John Forbes | episode: Pilot |
| 1977–1982 | Fantasy Island | Various roles | 4 episodes |
| 1978 | Hawaii Five-O | Kenneth Kirk | Season 10, Episode 21: "Frozen Assets" |
| 1979 | The Love Boat | Teddy Smith | episode: "Murder on the High Seas/Sounds of Silence/Cyrano de Bricker" |
| 1979 | Highcliffe Manor | The Narrator | 6 episodes |
| 1979 | Supertrain | Quentin Fuller | episode: "A Very Formal Heist" |
| 1979 | Mysterious Island of Beautiful Women | Gordon Duvall | television movie |
| 1981 | The Jeffersons | Museum Guide (Voice) | episode: "The House That George Built" |

== Radio appearances ==
| Year | Program | Episode/source |
|---|---|---|
| 1949 | Lux Radio Theatre | Green Dolphin Street |
| 1953 | Suspense | The Moonstone |
