= Eric Dodson =

English actor (1920–2000)

- Born: Eric Norman Dodson; 1 December 1920; Peterborough, Cambridgeshire, England
- Died: 13 January 2000 (aged 79); Cheltenham, Gloucestershire, England
- Occupation: Actor

Eric Norman Dodson (1 December 1920 – 13 January 2000) was an English actor born in Peterborough, Cambridgeshire, who played many roles in films and on television.

After amateur acting he joined the Royal Air Force in 1941. Following training in Canada he served in RAF Coastal Command, flew bombers and was a liaison officer in Yugoslavia. He then returned to acting with a repertory theatre in Edinburgh.

He appeared as bar owner Jack Pomeroy in Series Three to Five of Rumpole of the Bailey. He also appeared in the sitcom It Ain't Half Hot Mum as a Brigadier, the Doctor Who story The Visitation, in Porridge as Banyard, as Francis Durrant, in Crown Court (TV series) in 'A Death in the Family', and many other roles. His film appearances included The Dock Brief (1962), Danger by My Side (1962), Strictly for the Birds (1963), Battle of Britain (1969), The Mirror Crack'd (1980), The Masks of Death (1984) and Jekyll & Hyde (1990).

In the late 1980s, Eric and his wife Rosaline made their home in Sherborne, Gloucestershire where he took a hobby repairing and making harpsichords.

He was also asked on many occasions to play the organ at the village church.

He was unable to work for the last five years of his life due to illness and died in 2000 at age 79.

== Filmography ==
- A Touch of the Sun (1956) – Hotel Head Waiter (uncredited)
- Night Train for Inverness (1960) – Railwayman (uncredited)
- Sentenced for Life (1960) – (uncredited)
- Fate Takes a Hand (1961) – Janitor
- Edgar Wallace Mysteries, (Solo for Sparrow, episode) (1962) – Dr. Wolfson
- Danger by My Side (1962) – Warder Davis
- The Dock Brief (1962) – Examiner
- Gang War (1962) – Quigley
- The Set Up (1963) – Walker
- Dr. Crippen (1963) – Defence QC Clerk (uncredited)
- Strictly for the Birds (1963) – George
- Battle of Britain (1969) – RAF Officer (uncredited)
- The Mirror Crack'd (1980) – The Major
- Lady Killers (1981) – Dr. Henry Sworn
- The Masks of Death (1984) – Lord Claremont
