= One More Time (1970 film) =

1970 film by Jerry Lewis

- film poster by Jack Davis
- Directed by: Jerry Lewis
- Written by: Michael Pertwee
- Produced by: Milton Ebbins
- Starring: Sammy Davis Jr. Peter Lawford; John Wood
- Cinematography: Ernest Steward
- Edited by: Bill Butler
- Music by: Les Reed
- Production companies: Chrislaw Productions; Trace-Mark Productions
- Distributed by: United Artists
- Release date: 27 May 1970
- Running time: 92 minutes
- Countries: United Kingdom; United States
- Language: English

One More Time is a 1970 American-British comedy film directed by Jerry Lewis and starring Sammy Davis Jr. and Peter Lawford. It was filmed in 1969 and released in May, 1970 by United Artists. It is a sequel to the 1968 film Salt and Pepper.

== Plot ==
Chris Pepper and Charlie Salt lose their nightclub and turn to Pepper's aristocratic twin brother for help. He refuses to help them, and is then found murdered. Pepper assumes his identity, and soon discovers that he was a diamond smuggler, and was murdered by his accomplices. Salt and Pepper band together to put the criminals behind bars.

== Cast ==
- Sammy Davis Jr. as Charles Salt
- Peter Lawford as Christopher Pepper / Lord Sydney Pepper
- Maggie Wright as Miss Tomkins
- Ester Anderson as Billie
- John Wood as Figg
- Dudley Sutton as Wilson
- Percy Herbert as Mander
- Anthony Nicholls as Candler
- Allan Cuthbertson as Belton
- Edward Evans as Gordon
- Leslie Sands as Inspector Glock
- Glyn Owen as Dennis
- Lucille Soong as Kim Lee
- Peter Cushing as Baron Frankenstein
- Christopher Lee as Count Dracula
- Jerry Lewis as Bandleader (voice)

== Production ==
Shooting took place during the summer of 1969. It was made at the MGM-British Studios in Elstree and on location around London. Eastnor Castle in Herefordshire was used for Lord Pepper's country estate.

One More Time is the only film that Jerry Lewis directed in which he did not star, although he does have a role as the off-screen voice of the bandleader.

== Home media ==
The film was released on DVD on January 25, 2005. A code 'A' Blu-ray was released by Kino Lorber in 2022 as part of a double-feature disc along with the original film. A code 'B' blu-ray was released in Germany in 2024 and contains the German and English soundtrack.

== Novelization ==
Slightly before the release of the film, per the era's customary timing, a novelization of the screenplay was released by Popular Library. The author was Michael Avallone.
