= Danger Route =

1967 British film by Seth Holt

- Original film poster
- Directed by: Seth Holt
- Written by: Meade Roberts "additional screenplay" Robert Banks Stewart
- Based on: novel The Eliminator by Andrew York
- Produced by: Max Rosenberg; Milton Subotsky associate Ted Wallis
- Starring: Richard Johnson; Carol Lynley; Barbara Bouchet; Sylvia Syms; Gordon Jackson
- Cinematography: Harry Waxman
- Edited by: Oswald Hafenrichter
- Music by: John Mayer; Lionel Bart (title song)
- Production company: Amicus Productions
- Distributed by: United Artists
- Release date: November 16, 1967
- Running time: 91 minutes
- Country: United Kingdom
- Language: English

Danger Route is a 1967 British spy film directed by Seth Holt for Amicus Productions and starring Richard Johnson as Jonas Wilde, Carol Lynley and Barbara Bouchet. It was based on Andrew York's 1966 novel The Eliminator that was the working title of the film.

The film was released in the United States as a double feature with Attack on the Iron Coast.

== Plot ==
Jonas Wilde, a leading British agent, returns home from a mission in Guyana to Jersey, where he has a cover identity as the owner of a boatyard. He finds his handler Peter Ravenspur in the company of a mysterious woman named Mari, who claims to be Ravenspur's long lost niece. Responding to a personal message placed in The Times, Wilde travels to London to meet his superior Canning. Fearing his nerve has gone, Wilde tenders his resignation as an agent. Canning however persuades him to undertake a mission to assassinate Balin, a scientist who has defected from the East and is staying in England before travelling to America. Wilde is unaware that someone is planning to kill him when the mission is over.

Wilde seduces Rhoda, a housekeeper at the house where Balin is being kept, in order to access the house. He kills Balin, but is captured and interrogated by CIA agent Lucinda who tells Wilde that someone is causing British agents to be killed by mistake. He explains that Wilde had killed his agent Adams in Guyana and that he tracked Wilde back to Jersey. Wilde escapes and goes looking for Canning, who has disappeared. He teams up with Canning's wife, Barbara, and heads to the base in the Channel Islands. Aboard the ferry, Wilde subdues Lucinda's associate Bennett and leaves him and Barbara tied up while he makes his escape.

Fellow agent, Brian Stern, tells him that Ravenspur has been murdered. Wilde then takes Mari aboard Stern's boat for questioning. Stern reveals he is a double agent who has been controlling the organisation for some time. Under interrogation by Stern, Mari reveals she is working for Lucinda. Wilde and Mari escape, but Mari is killed by Stern, who is in turned killed by Wilde. Wilde goes back to London and discovers that his girlfriend, Jocelyn, was working for Stern. After outwitting her attempt to poison him, Wilde kills her. Canning meets Wilde outside his London flat and blackmails Wilde into remaining an agent.

== Cast ==
- Richard Johnson as Jonas Wilde
- Carol Lynley as Jocelyn
- Barbara Bouchet as Marita
- Sylvia Syms as Barbara Canning
- Gordon Jackson as Brian Stern
- Diana Dors as Rhoda Gooderich
- Maurice Denham as Peter Ravenspur
- Sam Wanamaker as Lucinda
- David Bauer as Bennett
- Robin Bailey as Parsons
- Harry Andrews as Tony Canning
- Julian Chagrin as Matsys
- Reg Lye as Balin
- Leslie Sands as man in cinema
- Timothy Bateson as Halliwell

== Production ==
The film was an attempt to cash in on the popularity of James Bond movies. It was based on The Eliminator, a novel by Andrew York about an assassin, Jonas Wilde, who worked for "The Route", a small government organization based on the island of Jersey. It was published in 1966. The Observer called it "a fast moving spy story". "There isn't a human, living character in the book," said The Guardian. The New York Times said "the author has narrative vigour and a great deal of ingenuity in small details which is probably enough to outbalance his liberal use of plot cliches." The character appeared in a series of novels.

Film rights were bought by Amicus who in January 1967 announced they would make the movie from a script by Meade Roberts under the direction of Seth Holt. It would be the first of a three-picture deal with United Artists. In February Amicus said Richard Johnson would play the lead. It was one of several starring roles Johnson played in the late 1960s. Diana Dors played a support role.

Milton Subotsky of Amicus called the movie doomed, saying the director Seth Holt was ill during filming, the script never worked and the cameraman was replaced in the middle of the shoot. Box office response was poor. Subotsky later said this and What Became of Jack and Jill? were "total failures".

It was shot at Shepperton Studios with sets designed by the art director Don Mingaye.

At one stage the working title was People Who Make No Noise Are Dangerous.

Holt called the film "dreadful. I scarcely saw it finished. I had a very difficult schedule. I was waiting between one and another and I needed the bread."

== Reception ==
The Monthly Film Bulletin called it "a tired, and tiring muddle of a film with characters interestingly introduced and then abruptly dropped only to turn up later as though nothing has happened in the meantime."

The Guardian called it "a reasonably satisfying piece of work".
