= Alan Tilvern =

English actor and voice artist (1918–2003)

- Tilvern as R. K. Maroon in Who Framed Roger Rabbit
- Born: Abraham Tilevitch; 5 November 1918; Orrendina, London, England
- Died: 17 December 2003 (aged 85); London, England
- Occupation: Actor
- Years active: 1946–1993
- Spouse: Diane Elliott (m. 1963)

Alan Tilvern (5 November 1918 – 17 December 2003) was an English actor. He was known for usually playing "tough-guy" roles.

== Life ==
Tilvern was born 5 November 1918 in Whitechapel, in the East End of London, to Lithuanian-Jewish parents, who changed their name from Tilovitch.

== War and film career ==
After leaving school, he became a barrow boy in Brick Lane. In the Second World War, he served in the Army but was invalided out before its end in 1945. A year later, he began an acting career (Danger by My Side being a good example), that lasted until the late 1980s. He is possibly best known for his role as R. K. Maroon in his last film, Who Framed Roger Rabbit.

== Death ==
Tilvern died on 17 December 2003, at the age of 85. He was survived by his daughter.

== Filmography ==
=== Television appearances ===
Year	Title	Role	Notes
1957	The Schirmer Inheritance	Arthur	Three episodes
1957	Educated Evans	Luigi	Episode: "The 15 Special"
1959	The Invisible Man	Caletta	Episode: "Odds Against Death"
1959	Interpol Calling	Johnny Stefano	Episode: "The Two-Headed Monster"
1960	The Four Just Men	Jake Zoldi/Colonel Gomez	Episodes: "Money to Burn"/"Justice for Gino"
1960	Danger Man	Major Minos	Episode: "The Girl in Pink Pajamas"
1960	Edgar Wallace Mysteries	Gordon Zeager	Episode: "The Malpas Mystery"
1963	Espionage	P'Eng Pat	Episodes: "The Dragon Slayer"
1963	The Plane Makers	Dr. Katz	Two episodes
1963	Z-Cars	Bob Randle	Three episodes
1964	Ann Veronica	Edward Ramage	Three episodes
1964	Dixon of Dock Green	Clifford Allan	Episode: "Children Beware"
1964	Doctor Who	Mark Forester	Serial: Planet of Giants
1964	Espionage	Ziggy	Episode: "Some Other Kind of World"
1965	The Saint	Captain Quitana	Episode: "The Golden Frog"
1966	Dixon of Dock Green	Harvey Slater	Episode: "The Fourth Finger"
1968	Dixon of Dock Green	Simmons	Episode: "The Trojan Horse"
1969	Dad's Army	Captain Rodrigues	Episode: "Battle School"
1969	Dixon of Dock Green	Billy Fuller	Episode: "Reluctant Witness"
1970	Comedy Playhouse	Manny Woulfe	Episode: "Who's Your Friend"
1970	UFO	US Delegate	Episode: "Confetti Check A-O.K."
1972	Dixon of Dock Green	The Arranger	Episode: "The Specialist"
1973	Dad's Army	U.S. Colonel Schultz	Episode: "My British Buddy"
1973	The Rivals of Sherlock Holmes	Mr. Cornelius	Episode: "Five Hundred Carats"
1974	The Top Secret Life of Edgar Briggs	President Fezzan	Episode: "The President"
1975	Dixon of Dock Green	Billy Nolan	Episode: "It's a Gift"
1976	Dixon of Dock Green	Morrie Finn	Episode: "Reunion"
1976	The Sweeney	Charlie Walters	Episode: "Sweet Smell of Succession"
1977	Poldark	Nicholas Warleggan	Seven episodes
1978	Play for Today	Richard Devizes	Episode: One Bummer News Day
1978	The Professionals	Stefan Batak II	Episode: "Killer With a Long Arm"
1979	The Professionals	Tarkos	Episode: "Dead Reckoning"
1980	Citizen Smith	Mr. Grainger	Episode: "Casablanca Was Never Like This"

=== Film ===
Year	Title	Role
1946	Jean's Plan	Max
1948	The Small Voice	
1950	Night and the City	Beggar (uncredited)
1950	Cairo Road	The Photographer
1951	Captain Horatio Hornblower	Hernandez
1953	Knights of the Round Table	Steward (uncredited)
1954	The Master Plan	Otto Szimek (uncredited)
1956	Bhowani Junction	Ted Dunphy
1956	The Bespoke Overcoat	Mr. Ranting
1956	House of Secrets	Brandelli
1958	Chase a Crooked Shadow	Carlos
1958	A Tale of Two Cities	Grave Robber (uncredited)
1958	No Time to Die	Silverio
1959	The Siege of Pinchgut	Superintendent Hanna
1959	Desert Mice	German Captain
1960	Sands of the Desert	Mustafa
1962	Danger by My Side	Nicky Venning
1964	Shadow of Fear	Warner
1964	Hot Enough for June	Simenova's Assistant
1966	Rasputin the Mad Monk	Patron
1966	Khartoum	Awaan
1967	The Frozen Dead	Karl Essen
1970	The Revolutionary	Sid
1974	Percy's Progress	General Dodds
1975	Love and Death	Sergeant
1977	The Stick Up	Richie
1978	The Lord of the Rings	Innkeeper / Odo Proudfoot (voice)
1978	Superman	2nd Controller (Missile Control)
1978	Brass Target	Frank Ferraro
1979	Meetings with Remarkable Men	
1982	Firefox	Air Marshal Kutuzov
1985	1919	Sophie's Father
1986	Little Shop of Horrors	"Downtown" Bum #2
1987	Tropic of Ice	Old American Director
1988	A Time of Destiny	Father Tony
1988	Who Framed Roger Rabbit	R.K. Maroon
