= Danger by My Side =

1963 British film by Charles Saunders

- Titles from the film
- Directed by: Charles Saunders
- Written by: Ronald Liles; Aubrey Cash
- Produced by: John I. Phillips
- Starring: Anthony Oliver; Maureen Connell; Alan Tilvern
- Cinematography: Walter J. Harvey
- Edited by: Jim Connock
- Music by: Martin Slavin
- Distributed by: Butcher's Film Service
- Release date: 1963
- Running time: 63 mins
- Country: United Kingdom
- Language: English

Danger by My Side (also known as Danger on My Side) is a 1963 black and white British second feature crime thriller film directed by Charles Saunders and starring Anthony Oliver, Maureen Connell and Alan Tilvern. It was written by Ronald Liles and Aubrey Cash.

== Plot ==
Bernie Hewson is a member of a gang which ambushes a security van. He gets stranded when the gang makes their getaway with the money, and carries the can for the job. On his release from prison he visits the gang's leader, Nicky Venning, asking for a cut of the money. Venning refuses but gets Hewson a job at his warehouse. As soon as Hewson arrives he recognises one of the employees, Terry, as an undercover police officer.

Not long afterwards, Terry's sister Lynne Marsden witnesses Terry getting deliberately run down by a car. Before he dies in hospital, Terry repeatedly mentions "Nicky's Club", Venning's Soho nightclub. Lynn visits the club and, calling herself Lynne Austin, is offered a job there. The next night she overhears a robbery being planned and manages to see the plans, taking the details to the police. Meanwhile she sets about investigating Venning and his gang herself, but is soon in danger when they discover her true identity.

== Cast ==
- Anthony Oliver as Detective Inspector Willoughby
- Maureen Connell as Lynne Marsden/Lynne Austin
- Alan Tilvern as Nicky Venning
- Bill Nagy as Sam Warren
- Sonya Cordeau as Francine Dumont
- Brandon Brady as Bernie Hewson
- Tom Naylor as Detective Sergeant 'Robbie' Roberts
- Richard Klee as Mills
- Kim Darvos as singer
- Wally Patch as factory gatekeeper
- John Stuart as prison governor
- Lawrence James as Terry
- Michael Beint as Danny
- Alex Gallier as Dino
- Eric Dodson as Warder Davis

== Production ==
The film was made at Shepperton Studios, England, and on location.

== Critical reception ==
The Monthly Film Bulletin wrote: "A distinctly tame and routine crime thriller, spiced with a touch of almost ludicrous striptease. Largely static, the story unwinds with little tension, and even the final moments are unexciting, despite smooth enough treatment and an adequate cast."

The Radio Times Guide to Films gave the film 1/5 stars, writing: "The road to justice leads to a Soho nightclub in this tawdry British B-movie. The hit-and-run murder, the sleazy club scenes, the heist and the motor-launch finale are all executed with the minimum of imagination as Maureen Connell puts her personal safety on the line while helping the police catch her detective-brother's killers. Charles Saunders's poor pacing leaves the cast high and dry."

Chibnall and McFarlane in The British 'B' Film wrote the film contained: "embarrassing cliched dialogue and unconvincing characterisations."

The term "flat white" for a coffee drink is used in the film. The term is generally thought to have been introduced in Australia or New Zealand in the 1980s; the Oxford English Dictionary cites its first known use as being in England in 1971.
