= Don Mingaye =

British art director

- Born: 1929; Kensington, London, United Kingdom
- Died: 8 November 2017 (aged 87–88); Norwich, Norfolk, United Kingdom
- Occupation: Art director
- Years active: 1955-1988 (film)

Don Mingaye (1929–2017) was a British art director. He was employed at Bray Studios working on the set designs for Hammer Films.

== Selected filmography ==
- The Abominable Snowman (1957)
- The Phantom of the Opera (1962)
- Kiss of the Vampire (1963)
- The Evil of Frankenstein (1964)
- The Brigand of Kandahar (1965)
- Danger Route (1967)
- Salt and Pepper (1968)
- Scream and Scream Again (1970)

== Bibliography ==
- Ede, Laurie N. British Film Design: A History. I.B.Tauris, 2010.
