= The Abominable Snowman (film) =

1957 British film by Val Guest

- Theatrical release poster
- Directed by: Val Guest
- Screenplay by: Nigel Kneale
- Based on: The Creature; 1955 TV play by Nigel Kneale
- Produced by: Aubrey Baring
- Starring: Forrest Tucker; Peter Cushing
- Cinematography: Arthur Grant
- Edited by: Bill Lenny
- Music by: Humphrey Searle
- Production company: Hammer Film Productions
- Distributed by: Warner Bros. Pictures (UK); 20th Century Fox (U.S.)
- Release dates: 26 August 1957 (United Kingdom); November 1957 (U.S.)
- Running time: 91 minutes 85 minutes (U.S. version)
- Country: United Kingdom
- Language: English

The Abominable Snowman (US title: The Abominable Snowman of the Himalayas; also known as The Snow Creature) is a 1957 British fantasy-horror film directed by Val Guest and starring Forrest Tucker, Peter Cushing, Maureen Connell and Richard Wattis. It was written by Nigel Kneale based on his 1955 BBC television play The Creature, which also starred Cushing. It was produced by Aubrey Baring for Hammer Films.

The film follows the exploits of a British scientist, Dr John Rollason, who joins an American expedition, led by glory-seeker Tom Friend, to search the Himalayas for the legendary Yeti.

== Plot ==
Dr John Rollason, his wife Helen, and their assistant Peter Fox are guests of the Lama of the monastery of Rong-ruk while on a botanical expedition to the Himalayas. A second group, led by Tom Friend accompanied by trapper Ed Shelley, photographer Andrew McNee and Sherpa guide Kusang, arrives at the monastery to search for the legendary Yeti or Abominable Snowman. Rollason, despite the objections of his wife and the Lama, decides to join Friend's expedition. Whereas Rollason is motivated by scientific curiosity to learn more about the creature, Friend seeks fame and fortune and wants to capture a live Yeti and present it to the world's press.

The expedition climbs high into the mountains and finds giant footprints in the snow, evidence of the Yeti's existence. As the tensions between Rollason and Friend rise, McNee is injured by a modified bear trap laid by Shelley to catch the Yeti.

When a Yeti is seen up close by Kusang, he cries that he has "Seen what man must not see..." and flees rapidly down the mountain to the monastery, from where Helen and Fox decide to mount a rescue mission. McNee is also psychically sensitive to the Yeti's proximity, which leads to Shelley shooting and killing a Yeti. The next day McNee, hearing the haunting calls of other Yeti, hobbles from his tent and falls off a cliff to his death.

Friend hatches a plan to trap a live Yeti by having a steel net rigged to the ceiling of a cave, with Shelley waiting, as bait, to spring the trap. Rollason is against the plan, but Shelley is keen to do it, believing the Yeti know that it was he who killed the first one, and that they will now come after him, so it is better to act first. Friend has given him a rifle, but unbeknownst to Shelley, it is loaded with blanks. A Yeti appears and as it tangles with the net, Shelley fires at it. Coming out of their hiding place nearby, Friend and Rollason find him dead, and Rollason discovers the rifle was loaded with blanks. Friend says that he knew Shelley would panic and fire the rifle, and did not want another dead creature. He says that the Yeti murdered Shelley, but Rollason points out that there are no marks on the body; he believes that the Yeti came only to retrieve their fallen comrade's body, and says that it was Shelley's intense fear, exacerbated by the rifle not firing, that caused him to have a heart attack and die, in which case Friend is responsible for his death.

Friend decides to cut his losses and leave with the body of the dead Yeti. However, the Yeti telepathically plant thoughts in Rollason's mind, and then make Friend hear the dead Shelley's voice calling for help. Friend rushes outside, firing his gun and dies in a crushing avalanche that he caused.

Rollason takes refuge in the cave and watches in amazement as two Yeti arrive to take away the body of their fallen compatriot. He realizes the Yeti are an intelligent species biding their time to claim the Earth for themselves after humanity has destroyed itself.

The rescue party finds Rollason outside a halfway-point hut, where the Yeti have actually brought him. At the monastery Rollason asserts to the Lama that "What I was searching for does not exist."

== Cast ==
John Rollason (Peter Cushing) and Tom Friend (Forrest Tucker) in a scene from The Abominable Snowman. The claustrophobic feel created by Val Guest in the film is evident.

- Forrest Tucker as Tom Friend
- Peter Cushing as Dr. John Rollason
- Maureen Connell as Helen Rollason
- Richard Wattis as Peter Fox
- Robert Brown as Ed Shelley
- Michael Brill as Andrew McNee
- Wolfe Morris as Kusang
- Arnold Marlé as Lhama (credited as Arnold Marle)
- Anthony Chinn as Majordomo (credited as Anthony Chin)
- John Rae as Yeti
- Joe Powell as Yeti
- Jack Easton as Yeti
- Fred Johnson as Yeti

== The Creature ==
Writer Nigel Kneale and television director/producer Rudolph Cartier had collaborated on several BBC dramas, including The Quatermass Experiment (1953) and Nineteen Eighty-Four (1954), an adaptation of the George Orwell novel. Their next production had been The Creature, a morality play written by Kneale about a search for the mysterious Yeti in the Himalayas. Kneale wished to write a story about the Yeti that would "not make him a monster but put a twist on it that really he was better than us". He was influenced by numerous reports of the Yeti that had appeared in the news at the time, including discoveries of footprints by explorer Eric Shipton in 1951 and by Edmund Hillary and Tenzing Norgay on the first complete ascent of Mount Everest in 1953. In particular, he was influenced by an unsuccessful 1954 expedition to find the Yeti sponsored by the Daily Mail newspaper.

The play starred Stanley Baker as Tom Friend and Peter Cushing as John Rollason with Arnold Marlé as the Lama, Eric Pohlmann as trapper Pierre Brosset, Simon Lack as photographer Andrew McPhee and Wolfe Morris as Nima Kusang. It was broadcast live from Lime Grove Studios on Sunday, 30 January 1955 and a repeat performance was broadcast live the following Wednesday, 2 February. The broadcast was not recorded and the only record of the production that survives is a series of screen images, known as tele-snaps, taken by photographer John Cura.

The play received mixed reviews: the critic in The Times found it unrealistic and dull. Similarly, Philip Hope-Wallace of The Listener found it “a Boy's Fiction standard with a conversational cut and thrust to the dialogue which sounded as dry and powdery as the snows of the film inserts”. On a more positive note, Peter Black in the Daily Mail found the play to be a “rousing, outdoor adventure story” while Clifford Davis in the Daily Mirror described it as “gripping stuff and, for this viewer, packed with terror”. The play was spoofed by The Goon Show in the episode "Yehti", broadcast on 8 March 1955.

== Development ==
Hammer Films purchased the rights to The Creature on 2 November 1956. They had enjoyed success with The Quatermass Xperiment (1955), an adaptation of the first Quatermass serial and achieved similar success with Quatermass 2 (1957), an adaptation of the television sequel. Val Guest, who had directed the two Quatermass films, was assigned to direct; this would be his third, and last, collaboration with Nigel Kneale.

=== Writing ===
Nigel Kneale wrote the screenplay, which is a generally faithful adaptation of his original television script, both of which run to approximately 90 minutes. It was initially titled The Snow Creature until it was discovered there was a 1954 film of the same name. According to Kneale, Hammer wanted a title more literal than The Creature, which played on the ambiguity as to whether the real monster of the piece was the Yeti or its human pursuers, and settled on The Abominable Snowman. The screenplay adds two characters: Rollason's wife Helen and his assistant Peter Fox. The addition of the character of Helen, who is named after Cushing's wife, was prompted by Cushing's desire to flesh out Rollason's character by representing a woman's point of view of his obsession with the Yeti. Kneale was able to modify the ending of the story by using the characters of Mrs Rollason and Peter Fox to develop a subplot in which they mount a rescue mission for the expedition. The characters of Pierre Brosset and Andrew McPhee are renamed as Ed Shelley and Andrew McNee respectively; these names were used by Kneale in early drafts of The Creature. Although Kneale is the only credited screenwriter, Guest performed his own rewrite of the script in advance of the production, removing a lot of dialogue that he felt was unnecessary. Guest said, “You can't have long speeches with people on the screen unless it's a closing argument in a court case or something.”

=== Casting ===
The American producer Robert L. Lippert co-produced many of Hammer's films in the early 1950s, including The Abominable Snowman. Under these co-production deals, Lippert provided an American star in return for the rights to distribute Hammer's films in the United States. For The Abominable Snowman, Lippert approached Forrest Tucker, who had previously appeared for Hammer in Break in the Circle (1954), also directed by Val Guest. Nigel Kneale considered Tucker's performance on a par with that of Stanley Baker, who had played the part in The Creature, saying, “Baker played it as a subtle, mean person, Forrest Tucker as more an extroverted bully, but they were both good performances and I found very little to choose. Tucker was, I think, an underrated and very good actor”. According to make-up artist Phil Leakey, Val Guest was disappointed with the casting of Tucker; he recalled, "Forrest Tucker might have been very good at some things but, to many people's minds, acting wasn't one of them and I think he rather spoilt the picture." The Abominable Snowman was the first of three horror films Tucker made in Britain around this time; the other two being The Strange World of Planet X (1958) and The Trollenberg Terror (1958).

Cushing reprised the role of John Rollason that he had played in The Creature. At this point in his career, he was best known as a television actor, having starred in productions of Pride and Prejudice (1952) and Beau Brummell (1954) as well as the Cartier/Kneale production of Nineteen Eighty-Four. The Abominable Snowman was his second picture for Hammer; the first had been The Curse of Frankenstein (1957), the film that brought him international fame and establish his long association with the Hammer horror brand. Recalling how the cast and crew were entertained by Cushing's improvisation with props, Val Guest said, “We used to call him 'Props Cushing' because he was forever coming out with props. When he was examining the Yeti tooth, he was pulling these things out totally unrehearsed and we found it very difficult keeping quiet.”

Like Cushing, Arnold Marlé and Wolfe Morris reprised their roles from The Creature as the Lama and Kusang, respectively.

=== Filming ===
The "eyes of worldly understanding" of actor Fred Johnson used by Val Guest to convey the benign intelligence of the Yeti in the climactic scenes of the film.

The Abominable Snowman was the only film to be produced for Hammer by Aubrey Baring, who was a member of the Barings banking family. Shooting began with a ten-day second unit location shoot at La Mongie in the French Pyrenees between 14 and 24 January 1957. Guest and Baring led a crew that included cinematographer Arthur Grant, camera operator Len Harris and focus puller Harry Oakes. Local trade union rules required that they were accompanied by a French crew. None of the principal performers were brought on location and doubles were used for the actors. Most of the filming was done in the vicinity of the observatory at the summit of Pic du Midi de Bigorre, reached by cable car from La Mongie. Although a helicopter was used for some of the panoramic shots of the mountains, many of them were shot from the cable car as it ascended the mountain. Cognisant of the conditions they would be working in, Harris used a Newman-Sinclair clockwork camera whereas the French crew used a conventional Mitchell BFC camera, which failed numerous times on account of the cold.

The film was shot in an anamorphic wide screen format called Regalscope, renamed "Hammerscope" by the company. Val Guest found it an unsatisfactory format to work in, which made getting in close to the actors difficult and required careful framing of scenes. This was the first film Arthur Grant worked on for Hammer as cinematographer and his reputation for being fast and cheap meant he soon replaced Jack Asher as Hammer's regular cinematographer. Just as he had done with the Quatermass films, Guest tried to give the film "an almost documentary approach of someone going on an expedition with a camera for Panorama or something". To this effect, he made extensive use of hand-held camera and overlapping dialogue.

Principal photography took place between 28 January and 5 March 1957 at Bray and Pinewood studios. The sets for the monastery were constructed at Bray by production designer Bernard Robinson, assisted by art director Ted Marshall and draughtsman Don Mingaye, and required detailed research in books and libraries. Nigel Kneale was particularly impressed by the monastery set, feeling that it acted not just as a background but as a participant in the story. These sets were later reused for the series of Fu Manchu movies made in the 1960s, starring Christopher Lee. Assistance was provided by members of a Buddhist temple in Guildford to choreograph the monks chanting. Most of the extras were waiters in Chinese restaurants in London. It was realised early in production that there was insufficient space at Bray for the sets depicting the snowscapes of the Himalayas and so production shifted to Pinewood. Each element of the set was built on a wheeled rostrum so the set could be reconfigured to show many different panoramic backdrops. The set was decorated with artificial snow made of polystyrene and salt. Matching the footage shot in the Pyrenees with the scenes filmed in Pinewood represented a major challenge for Guest and his editor Bill Lenny. Guest had a Moviola editing machine brought on set so he could view scenes from the location shoot and synchronise them up with the scenes being shot at Pinewood.

It was Val Guest's view that the Yeti should be kept largely off-screen, bar a few glimpses of hands and arms, leaving the rest to the audience's imagination. By contrast, Nigel Kneale felt that the creatures should be shown in their entirety to get across the message of the script that the Yeti are harmless, gentle creatures. In the climactic scene where Rollason comes face to face with the Yeti, their bodies are silhouetted and only the eyes are seen close up and distinctly: Guest used Fred Johnson to play the Yeti in this scene, relying on his "eyes of worldly understanding" to convey the benign nature of the Yeti.

=== Music ===
The musical score was provided by Humphrey Searle, his only score for Hammer. The score was heavily influenced by that of another film with the theme of exploration: Scott of the Antarctic (1948), composed by Ralph Vaughan Williams.

== Release ==
The Abominable Snowman was released on 26 August 1957, with an 'A' Certificate from the British Board of Film Censors, as part of a double bill with Untamed Youth, starring Mamie Van Doren. In the United States, it was released under the title The Abominable Snowman of the Himalayas. Reviews were positive and it is now considered something of a minor classic. Derek Hill of the Evening Standard found it to be "among the best of British science-fiction thrillers".

The release of the film was overshadowed somewhat by the huge success of Hammer's The Curse of Frankenstein, released the same year, and it was a relative financial failure, a fact Val Guest attributed to the intelligence of the script, saying, "It was too subtle and I also think it had too much to say. No one was expecting films from Hammer that said anything but this one did ... audiences didn't want that sort of thing from Hammer." This was the last film Hammer made in association with Robert L. Lippert; following the success of The Curse of Frankenstein, Hammer was now in a position to be able to deal directly with the major American distributors.

== Reception ==
Critical views of the film in the years since its release generally consider it to be one of the lesser films in the Hammer and Nigel Kneale canon. Critic Bill Warren finds it to be "an intelligent but commonplace adventure thriller with the Yeti little more than background figures ... a little too ponderous and hence unexciting". Similarly, John Baxter felt that "in recreating a peak in the Himalayas, the set designer had more control over the film than the director, and despite some tense action the story drags". Baxter acknowledged, however, that the film exercises "a certain eerie influence", a view echoed by Hammer historians Marcus Hearn and Alan Barnes that "the film conveys a taut, paranoid atmosphere; set largely in wide open spaces, it's remarkably claustrophobic in scale".

Nigel Kneale's biographer, Andy Murray, finds the film "eerie and effective" and also suggests the scenes of the expedition members calling out to their lost colleagues across the wastelands influenced similar scenes in The Blair Witch Project (1999).

Leslie Halliwell said: "A thin horror film with intelligent scripting: more philophisizing and characterization than suspense. The briefly glimsped Yeti are disappointing creations."

The Radio Times Guide to Films gave the film 3/5 stars, writing: "Tensely directed by Val Guest, the film uses eerie claustrophobia to convey a taut paranoid atmosphere that makes you overlook the fakeness of the studio-built mountains."

In British Sound Films: The Studio Years 1928–1959 David Quinlan rated the film as "average", writing: "Decently made shocker misses out on the chills."

== Home media ==
In addition to standalone releases, the film can be found as part of the 3-DVD box set Superstars of Horror: Volume 1: Peter Cushing (Umbrella Entertainment, 2005).

An Ultra HD Blu-ray is due to be released on 28 September 2026.

== Bibliography ==
- Baxter, John (1970). Science Fiction in the Cinema. London/New York: The Tantivy Press/A. S. Barnes & Co. ISBN 0-302-00476-9.
- Guest, Val; Kneale, Nigel (2003). Audio commentary for The Abominable Snowman (DVD). London: DD Video. DD06165.
- Hearn, Marcus; Barnes, Alan (2007) [1997]. The Hammer Story. The Authorised History of Hammer Films (2nd ed.). London: Titan Books. ISBN 978-1-84576-185-1.
- Hearn, Marcus; Rigby, Jonathan (2003). Viewing notes for The Abominable Snowman (DVD). London: DD Video. DD06165.
- Huckvale, David (2008). Hammer Film Scores and the Musical Avant-Garde. Jefferson, North Carolina: McFarland. ISBN 978-0-7864-3456-5.
- Kinsey, Wayne (2002). Hammer Films: The Bray Studios Years. London: Reynolds & Hearn Ltd. ISBN 978-1-903111-44-4.
- Kinsey, Wayne (2010). Hammer Films: The Unsung Heroes. Sheffield: Tomahawk Press. ISBN 978-0-9557670-2-9.
- Murray, Andy (2006). Into The Unknown. The Fantastic Life of Nigel Kneale. London: Headpress. ISBN 978-1-900486-50-7.
- Wake, Oliver (25 November 2010). "The Creature (1955)". British Television Drama.
- Warren, Bill (1982). Keep Watching the Skies! American Science Fiction Movies of the Fifties. Vol. I: 1950–1957. Jefferson, North Carolina: McFarland Classics. ISBN 0-7864-0479-5.
- Warren, Bill (1986). Keep Watching the Skies! American Science Fiction Movies of the Fifties. Vol. II:1958–1962. Jefferson, North Carolina: McFarland Classics. ISBN 0-7864-0479-5.
