= Milton Ebbins =

American jazz trumpeter (1912-2008)

Background information
- Born: Milton Keith Ebbins; February 20, 1912; Springfield, Massachusetts, U.S.
- Died: April 4, 2008 (aged 96) Los Angeles, California, U.S.
- Genres: Swing; big band; mainstream jazz; blues
- Occupation: Musician
- Instrument: Trumpet
- Labels: RCA Victor, Okeh
- Formerly of: Count Basie

Milton Keith Ebbins (February 20, 1912 - April 4, 2008) was an American trumpeter, bandleader, songwriter, talent manager and movie/television producer. He began his career as a trumpet player and bandleader in the early-1930s. It was at this time when he met his wife, a singer named Lynne Sherman. They were married in 1941 and stayed together for 67 years until his death in 2008. She died the following year, March 27, 2009.

== Early life and education ==
Ebbins was born on February 20, 1912, in Springfield, Massachusetts. His father was a tailor who once hand-delivered a specially made coat to President Theodore Roosevelt at the White House. Ebbins briefly attended Amherst College in Massachusetts.

== Career ==
Soon after setting aside his career as a bandleader, Ebbins became one of the top talent managers in Hollywood, navigating the careers of Count Basie, Sarah Vaughn, Billy Eckstine and Vic Damone. Ebbins also represented actress Elizabeth Montgomery, actor Peter Lawford, actress Patty Duke and comedian Mort Sahl. Lawford was married to Patricia Kennedy, who was President John F. Kennedy's sister. An article in The Hollywood Reporter stated that "Ebbins' partnership with Lawford...brought him into close association with The Rat Pack and the Kennedy clan." The films Salt and Pepper and One More Time, starring Rat Packers Peter Lawford and Sammy Davis Jr., were produced by Ebbins. He helped put together the original Rat Pack film Ocean's Eleven and also the subsequent Rat Pack film Sergeants 3. According to an article in Variety, Ebbins "was involved in the production of The Longest Day."

=== Association with the Kennedys and Marilyn Monroe ===
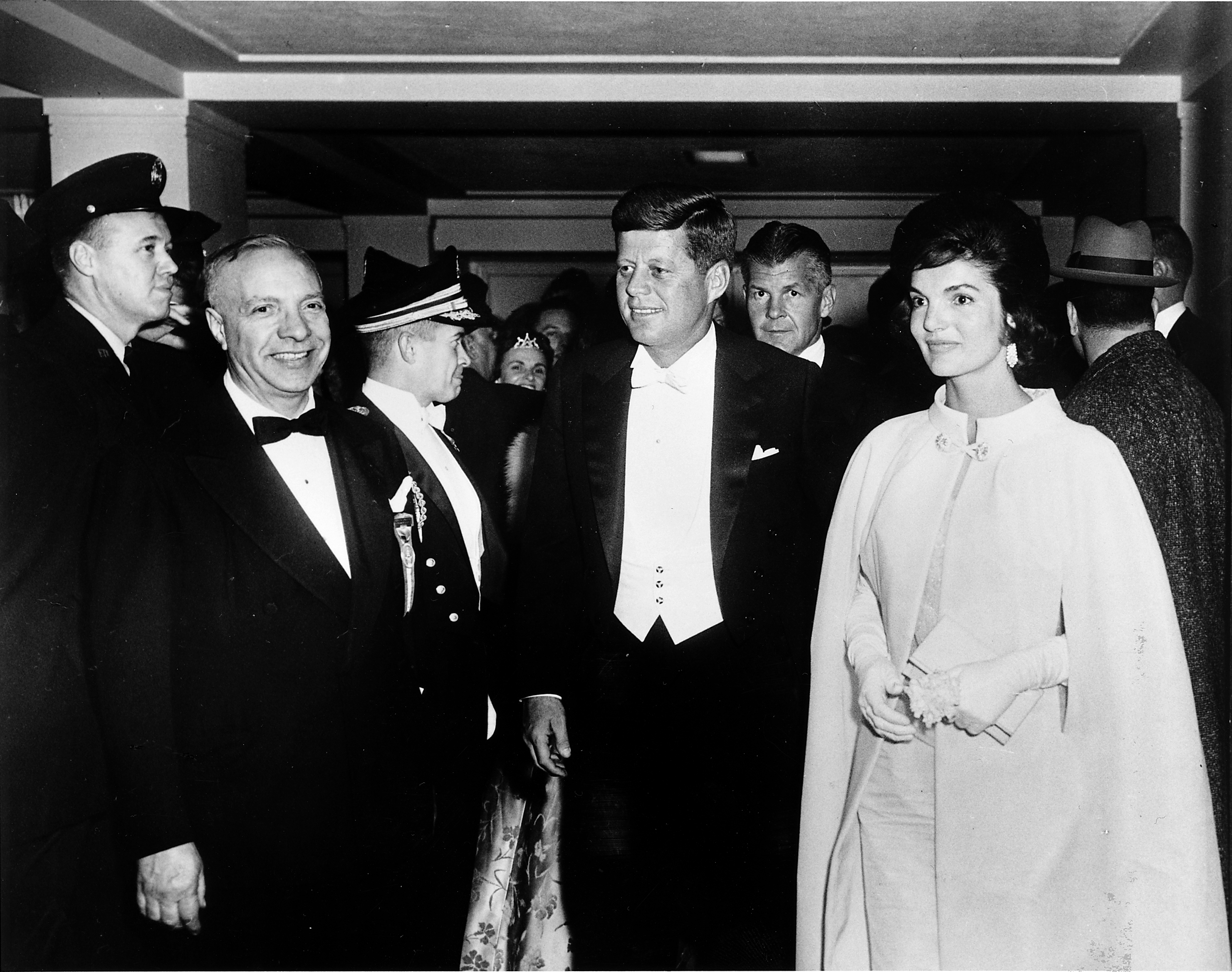
President Kennedy and Jacqueline Kennedy arrive at the D.C. Armory in Washington D.C. for an inaugural ball held on the evening of Inauguration Day, January 20, 1961

Since Ebbins had become an insider in the Kennedy administration, he was often called upon to assist them in various ways. Ebbins helped produce President Kennedy's Inaugural Ball in 1961 and his Anniversary gala in 1962. According to The Hollywood Reporter, "He was a frequent visitor to the Kennedy White House, at times accompanying the President on Air Force One and Marine One." And "because of his unique position, he was often sought out by authors and has been quoted in many books about the Kennedy's."

Being so closely connected with the Kennedy family afforded him the opportunity to become very well acquainted with Marilyn Monroe. He experienced a few interesting incidents with the blond bombshell. One evening in February 1962, about an hour before a New York dinner party was supposed to take place, which was being given in honor of President Kennedy by socialite FiFi Fell at her Park Avenue penthouse, Ebbins was asked to pick up Monroe at her apartment and bring her to the party. After patiently waiting two hours for her to get ready, Ebbins walked into her bedroom, uninvited, to see if she was ready yet. (Peter Lawford, who was already at the party, anxiously waiting for the two of them to arrive, angrily telephoned Ebbins twice to see what the holdup was. Since he was being pressured by Lawford to hurry up and get her over there, Ebbins felt as though he had no other recourse but to intrude into Monroe's bedroom.) When he did, however, he noticed her "sitting at her vanity table, naked, staring at herself in the mirror," stated James Spada in a Vanity Fair article that was excerpted from his biography Peter Lawford: The Man Who Kept the Secrets. After about 30 minutes of helping her get dressed, both Ebbins and Monroe left in a chauffeured limousine and headed to the party.

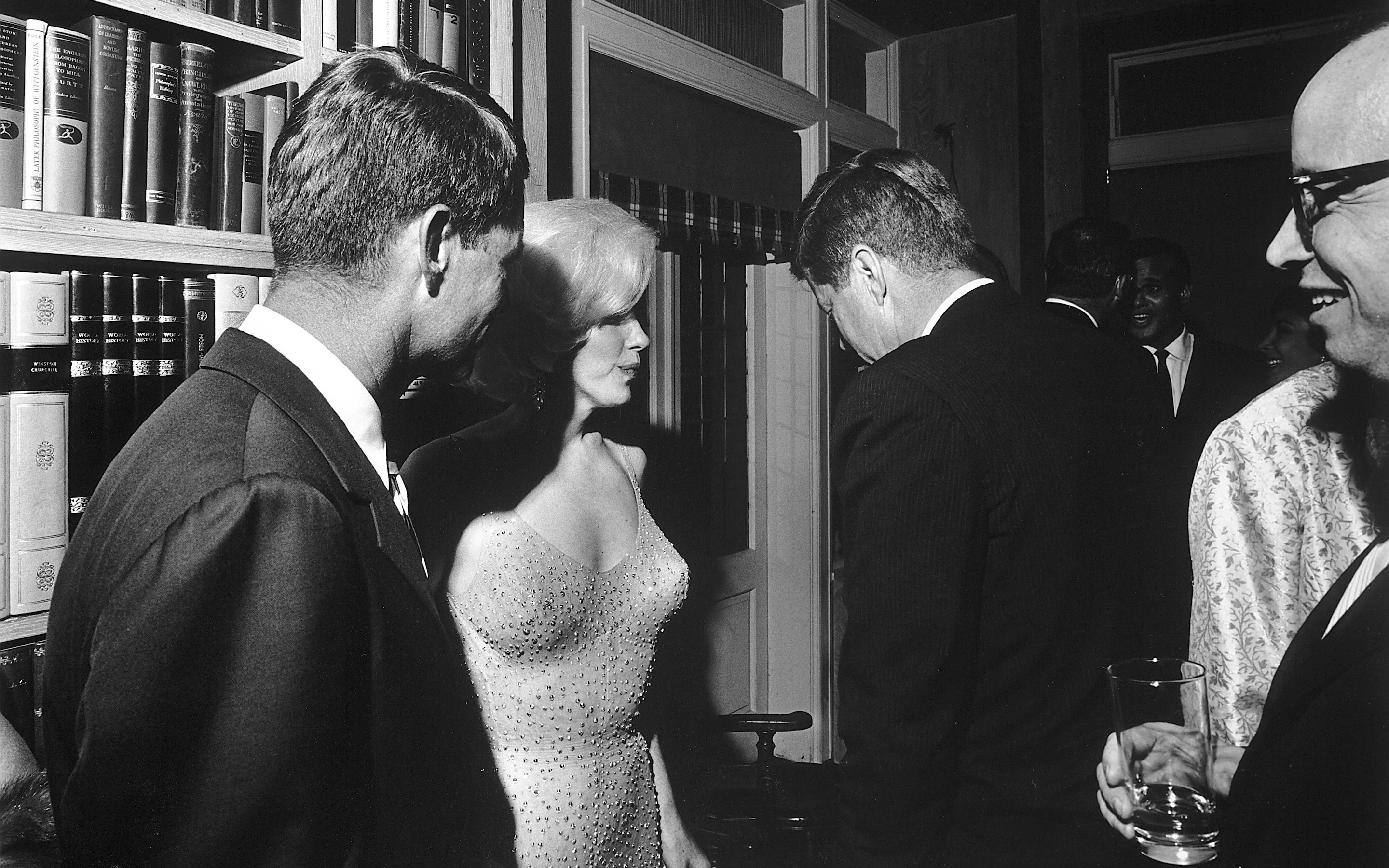
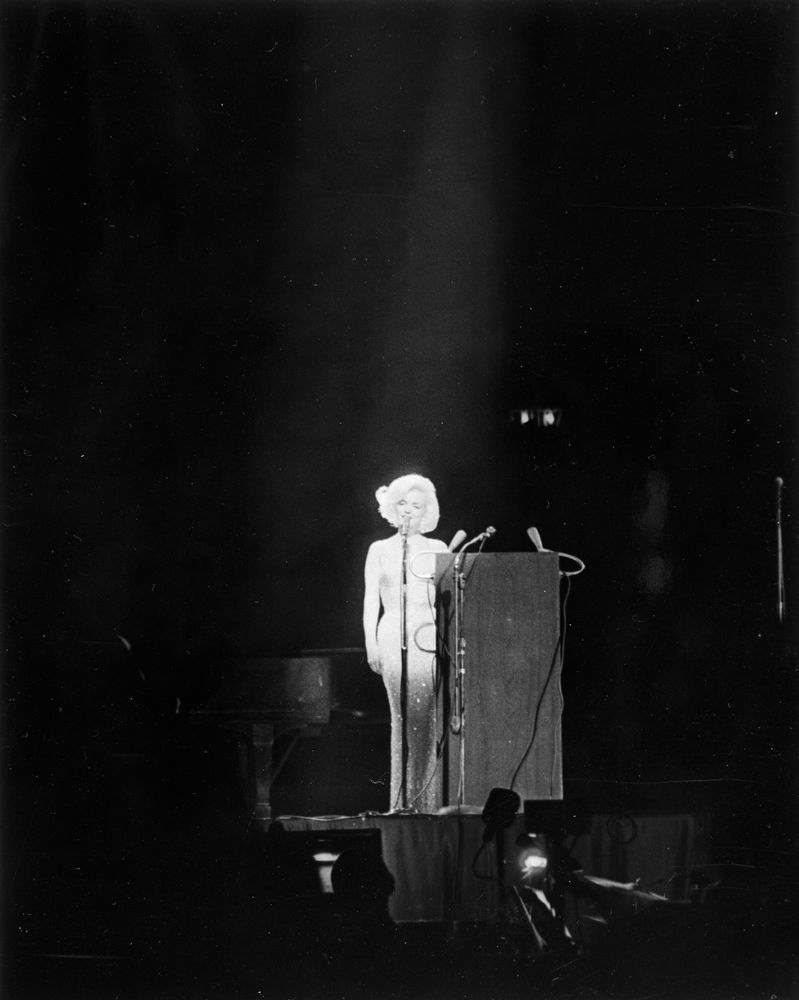
President Kennedy (his back to camera), Robert Kennedy and actress Marilyn Monroe (left) and Monroe sings to Kennedy during Madison Square Garden event for his 45th birthday (right).

Another interesting Marilyn Monroe incident that Ebbins was involved in happened on May 19, 1962. That was the memorable day that he escorted Monroe to Madison Square Garden where she sang Happy Birthday, Mr. President.

The final Marilyn Monroe incident that Ebbins was involved in happened on the eve of her death. Peter Lawford called him after speaking to Monroe, asking Ebbins to try and get in touch with her psychiatrist. Unable to reach him, Ebbins later called Monroe's lawyer. Her lawyer took control of the situation at that point.

== Death ==
Ebbins died of heart failure on April 4, 2008. "At the time of his death, Ebbins was working with actor Bill Paxton on an HBO project about the assassination of JFK," stated The Hollywood Reporter.
