= Leslie Sands =

British actor (1921–2001)

- Born: 19 May 1921; Bradford, Yorkshire, England, UK
- Died: 9 May 2001 (aged 79); Chepstow, Monmouthshire, Wales, UK
- Occupation: Actor
- Years active: 1961–1979
- Spouse: Pauline Williams (1950–9 May 2001) (his death).

Leslie Sands (19 May 1921 – 9 May 2001) was a British actor and writer of TV and film. Born in Bradford, Yorkshire, Leslie Sands usually specialised in dour types in authority, often policemen. He was married to Pauline Williams (1950 – 9 May 2001, his death).

== Career ==
According to the obituary published in The Guardian, 'From school in Bradford, he went to Leeds University to read English, [and] caught the acting bug in student productions' In 1941, Sands had his theatrical debut at the Lyceum Theatre in Sheffield. He was a member of the Royal Shakespeare Company and appeared in several Royal National Theatre productions, among others.

His many TV roles included the lead character role of Cluff, The Saint, The Avengers, Z-Cars (for which he wrote several episodes), The Main Chance, Department S, Juliet Bravo, The Two Ronnies, Murder Most English, Boon and Stay Lucky.

The first TV adaptation of Johnny Speight's If There Weren't Any Blacks You'd Have To Invent Them screened in 1968 (b&w) starred Sands in the role of the blind man. The revised colour version in 1974 starred Leonard Rossiter in the same role. He also appears with Leonard Rossiter in The Fall & Rise of Reginald Perrin (series 3, episode 3), The Seven Dials Mystery (1981).

His film roles included appearances in The Deadly Affair (1966), Danger Route (1967), One More Time (1970), The Ragman's Daughter (1972), Escape from the Dark (1976) and Bloodline (1979).

Leslie's TV writing credits include Van Der Valk and A Family at War as well as Z-Cars.

Leslie Sands also wrote a number of plays, the most notable being Intent to Murder. Others include his Seaside Trilogy—comprising Beside the Seaside, A Basinful of Briny, and Good Old Summertime—as well as Stay Single & Live Forever, Sam Up In The World, Cat's Cradle, The Conscience Of Sergeant Cluff, and Something To Hide. His play Deadlock was adapted into the movie Another Man's Poison, starring Bette Davis and Gary Merrill.

His grandson is actor Devin Stanfield, known for his leading role in cult TV series The Box of Delights (1984), and guest star in Chocky (1984).

== Filmography ==
Year	Title	Role	Notes
1961	The Clue of the New Pin	Sergeant Harris	
1962	Life for Ruth	Clyde - newspaper editor	
1962	Death Trap	Det. Insp. Simons	
1965	Rapture	First Gendarme	
1967	The Deadly Affair	Inspector	
1967	Danger Route	Man in Cinema	
1967	One More Time	Inspector Crock	
1972	The Ragman's Daughter	Doris' father	
1973	The Roses Of Eyam	Thomas Stanley	
1976	Escape from the Dark	Foreman Sam Carter	
1979	Bloodline	Doctor	
