= Maureen Connell =

British actress (born 1931)

- Born: 2 August 1931 (age 95); Nairobi, British Kenya
- Other name: Maureen O'Connell
- Occupation: Film actress
- Years active: 1954–1972
- Spouse(s): John Guillermin (m. 1956; div. 1999)
- Children: Michelle (b. 1959); Michael-John (1963–1984)

Maureen Connell (born 2 August 1931) is a British actress.

== Background ==
On 20 July 1956, Connell married British film director, writer and producer John Guillermin. They resided in the Los Angeles area beginning 1968. They had two children, Michelle and Michael-John, the latter of whom died in 1984 in a car collision in Truckee, California.

== Selected filmography ==
- Golden Ivory (1954)
- Port Afrique (1956)
- You Can't Escape (1957)
- The Rising of the Moon (1957)
- Lucky Jim (1957)
- Town on Trial (1957)
- Kill Her Gently (1957)
- The Abominable Snowman (1957)
- Stormy Crossing (1958)
- The Man Upstairs (1958)
- Next to No Time (1958)
- The Crowning Touch (1959)
- Never Let Go (1960)
- Danger by My Side (1962)
- Skyjacked (1972)

== Television ==
- ITV Television Playhouse (1955)
- The Adventures of the Scarlet Pimpernel (1956) (Episode 4: 'A Tale of Two Pigtails')
- Espionage (TV series) ('Snow on Mount Kama', episode) (1964) (as Eva Marston)
- Danger Man TV series ('Yesterday's Enemies', Series 2 Episode 1) Jo Dutton (1964)
