= Kill Her Gently =

1957 British film by Charles Saunders

- Theatrical release poster
- Directed by: Charles Saunders
- Written by: Paul Erickson
- Produced by: Guido Coen
- Starring: Griffith Jones; Maureen Connell; Marc Lawrence; George Mikell
- Cinematography: Walter J. Harvey
- Edited by: Marjorie Saunders
- Music by: Edwin Astley
- Production company: Fortress Film Productions
- Distributed by: Columbia Pictures UK
- Release dates: December 1957 (UK); October 1958 (USA)
- Running time: 75 minutes
- Country: United Kingdom
- Language: English

Kill Her Gently is a 1957 British second feature thriller film directed by Charles Saunders and starring Griffith Jones, Maureen Connell and Marc Lawrence. It was written by Paul Erickson.

== Plot ==
A motorist picks up two convicts who have just escaped from prison. He recognises the men from descriptions given of them on the radio. He hires them to murder his wife. The plan goes wrong, and he and the convicts meet their doom.

== Cast ==
- Griffith Jones as Jeff Martin
- Maureen Connell as Kay Martin
- Marc Lawrence as William Connors
- George Mikell as Lars Svenson
- Shay Gorman as Doctor Jimmy Landers
- Marianne Brauns as Raina
- Frank Hawkins as Inspector Raglan
- John Gayford as truck driver
- Roger Avon as Constable Brown
- Patrick Connor as Detective Sgt. Thompson
- Jonathan Meddings as bank clerk
- Peter Stephens as bank manager
- Susan Neill as barmaid
- David Lawton as Slade
- Elaine Wells as Mrs Douglas

== Critical reception ==
The Monthly Film Bulletin wrote: "The emphatic style needed to sustain this implausible thriller (made some time ago and now severely cut) is not forthcoming in the anaemic performances of the cast, so that interest rests with the five deaths scattered liberally throughout the story."

Picture Show gave the film 1/3 stars, calling it a "dreary tale".

In British Sound Films: The Studio Years 1928–1959 David Quinlan rated the film as "mediocre", writing: "Dreary thriller, severely cut before its release in 1960."

British film critic Leslie Halliwell said: "Very mild and unmemorable thriller."
