= Salt and Pepper (film) =

1968 film by Richard Donner

- Original film poster by Jack Davis
- Directed by: Richard Donner
- Written by: Michael Pertwee
- Produced by: Milton Ebbins
- Starring: Sammy Davis Jr. Peter Lawford; Michael Bates
- Cinematography: Ken Higgins
- Edited by: Jack Slade
- Music by: John Dankworth
- Production companies: Chrislaw Productions; Trace-Mark Productions
- Distributed by: United Artists
- Release dates: 3 July 1968 (Sweden); 21 June 1968 (US)
- Running time: 102 minutes
- Country: United States; United Kingdom
- Language: English
- Box office: $1,750,000 (US/Canada rentals)

Salt and Pepper (also known as Salt & Pepper) is a 1968 buddy spy comedy film directed by Richard Donner and written by Michael Pertwee. It stars Rat Pack members Sammy Davis Jr. and Peter Lawford as Charlie Salt and Chris Pepper, owners of a Swinging London nightclub that become embroiled in a political conspiracy.

An American and British co-production, the film was released by United Artists on June 21, 1968. It received mixed reviews but was a commercial success and spawned a sequel, One More Time (1970).

== Plot ==
American Charlie Salt and British Chris Pepper own a Soho nightclub, operating under the suspicious eye of the intrepid Inspector Crabbe. One night, Pepper finds a Chinese woman on the floor of the club. Assuming she's intoxicated, he makes a date with her and thinks she responds. It turns out the girl is actually dying. Salt and Pepper are questioned by Crabbe, before being kidnapped by Colonel Balsom of the Secret Service, who tells them the woman was a British agent.

Salt and Pepper find the dead woman's diary, which contains the names of four men marked for murder, and decide to solve the case themselves. Despite their efforts, three of the men are murdered. They eventually discover a plot by the renegade Colonel Woodstock to overthrow the British government, and are kidnapped and taken aboard a landlocked submarine.

The two escape and go to Colonel Balsom, but when they return the submarine is nowhere to be found. They eventually find the conspirators' secret headquarters at the Imperial War Museum. They commandeer a tank and manage to defeat Woodstock.

For their heroic efforts, the duo are both knighted by the queen.

== Cast ==
- Sammy Davis Jr. as Charles Salt
- Peter Lawford as Christopher Pepper
- Michael Bates as Inspector Crabbe
- Ilona Rodgers as Marianne Renaud
- John Le Mesurier as Colonel Woodstock
- Graham Stark as Sergeant Walters
- Ernest Clark as Colonel Balsom
- Jeanne Roland as Mai Ling
- Robert Dorning as Club Secretary
- Robertson Hare as Dove
- Geoffrey Lumsden as Foreign Secretary
- William Mervyn as Prime Minister
- Llewellyn Rees as 'Fake' Prime Minister
- Mark Singleton as 'Fake' Home Secretary
- Michael Trubshawe as 'Fake' First Lord
- Francesca Tu as Tsai Chan
- Oliver MacGreevy as Rack
- Peter Hutchins as Straw
- Jeremy Lloyd as Lord Ponsonby
- Ivor Dean as Police Commissioner
- Beth Rogan as Greta
- Calvin Lockhart as Jones
- Nicholas Smith as Constable

== Production ==
It was shot at Shepperton Studios and on location in London and at Elvetham Hall in Hampshire. The film's sets were designed by the art director Don Mingaye. It was followed by a 1970 sequel One More Time directed by Jerry Lewis.

Donner said "I was fired from the cutting and Sammy and Peter did it. What I did I loved, but I’ve never seen their film... I was trying to make a simple Abbott and Costello kind of wonderful thing and they wanted to do the problems in a black and white relationship. Anyway what I did was good enough so they got a sequel out of it."

== Critical reception ==
The Monthly Film Bulletin wrote: "Directed with vaguely swinging trimmings in the Clive Donner manner by yet another recruit from television, this is a Carry On in all but name and cast, in which Sammy Davis does one indifferent number and, along with Peter Lawford, dispenses much bonhomie to remarkably little effect amid stock characters and situations. Both the pseudo-Bond action and the slapstick comedy are excruciatingly ill-timed; any even tolerably witty joke is repeated several times over; and the studio-built Soho looks studio-built."

The Radio Times Guide to Films gave the film 3/5 stars, writing: "Sinatra clan members, Sammy Davis Jr and Peter Lawford came to Britain to make this amiable, though strictly routine, comedy crime caper. They play Soho club-owners involved in a series of murders that turn out to be part of an international conspiracy. The attempt to jump on the "Swinging London" bandwagon, pathetic at the time, now has high camp value and some of the lines are still funny. Although loathed by the press and eventually released as a second-feature, it produced a sequel (One More Time) in 1970."

British film critic Leslie Halliwell said: "Infuriating throwaway star vehicle set in the dregs of swinging London. The sequel, One More Time (1970), was quite unnecessary"

== Novelization ==
Popular Library published a paperback novelization by Alex Austin of Michael Pertwee's screenplay.
