= The Other Side of the Underneath =

1972 film by Jane Arden

- DVD cover
- Directed by: Jane Arden
- Written by: Jane Arden
- Produced by: Jack Bond
- Starring: Sheila Allen
- Cinematography: Jack Bond; Aubrey Dewar
- Edited by: David Mingay
- Music by: Sally Minford
- Production company: Jack Bond Films
- Release date: October 1972
- Running time: 110 minutes
- Country: United Kingdom
- Language: English

The Other Side of the Underneath is a 1972 British experimental psychological drama film written and directed by Jane Arden and starring Sheila Allen, Suzanka Fraey, Liz Danciger, Ann Lynn, and Penny Slinger. Other members of the Holocaust Theatre Company appear in the film. Jane Arden herself also appears in the film.

It is the only British feature film in the 1970s to be solely directed by a woman. The title of the film is taken from a line in Arden's play Vagina Rex and the Gas Oven, which was a huge success at the London Arts Lab in 1969. The film is an adaptation of Arden's 1971 play A New Communion for Freaks, Prophets and Witches. The film had almost mythical status amongst fans of radical, experimental cinema, partly because of its visionary and disturbing depictions of the mental state of its schizophrenic protagonist, and also its unavailability.

== Plot ==
The film looks inside the mind of a young woman labelled schizophrenic and finds, not madness, but tortured sexual guilt created by the taboos of society. Juxtaposing visions of personal hell with group psychotherapy sessions, The Other Side of the Underneath is an unsettling experience and provides an illustration of the idea that insanity is a kind of death that must be followed by rebirth. The terrifying fantasy sequences are utterly convincing images of madness from the inside and convey the despair and destitution of a personality that has been fragmented.

== Cast ==
- Sheila Allen as Meg the Peg
- Susanka Fraey
- Liz Danciger
- Ann Lynn
- Penny Slinger
- Jane Arden as Therapist
- Sally Minford as Cellist
- Jenny Moss
- Liz Kustow
- Rosie Marcham
- Elaine Donovan
- Bill Deasey

== Production ==
=== Filming ===
The locations for the film were primarily in and around the Welsh mining communities of Abertillery and Cwmtillery in Blaenau Gwent. One early episode was filmed at the Newport Transporter Bridge.

Alcohol and LSD use was rampant from the crew during production, particularly with Arden. The filmmaking process was so painfully intense for almost everyone involved that it brought an end to the Holocaust theatre company, and the majority of participants parted ways for good.

=== Music ===
The extraordinary soundtrack to the film was primarily the work of the cellist Sally Minford, who appears, actually playing the cello, in many interior and exterior scenes, and the sound editor Robert Hargreaves.

== Release ==
=== Obscurity ===
Until the July 2009 showings at the National Film Theatre (BFI South Bank) and The Cube Microplex in Bristol, it had not been publicly shown anywhere since a July 1983 National Film Theatre tribute to Arden, who had committed suicide at the end of the previous year. Like Separation (1967) and Anti-Clock (1979) the film remained unseen and was thought lost for many decades.

=== Home media ===
The British Film Institute restored and remastered the film for DVD and Blu-ray release on 13 July 2009. The Other Side of the Underneath was re-released simultaneously with Arden's other two feature films.

=== Critical reception ===
- 'I don't know of anyone in cinema who has penetrated the psyche to the extent she [Jane Arden] has, or evolved visual language of such richness and strength to convey what she has to say.' - Molly Plowright, Glasgow Herald
- 'A shattering experience' - BBC Radio 1
- 'A descent into what is called ‘madness’ or ‘schizophrenia’ demands a radical break from cinematic conventions and Jane Arden has achieved a major breakthrough. The movie follows the death and rebirth of a human being in terms which echo the world of R.D. Laing and David Cooper. At the same time it promises a rebirth of the cinema. It is a terrifying, haunting, and enriching experience.' - David Will, Co-Director of the Edinburgh Film Festival, 1972
- 'A boldly feminist film in its engagement with, and rejection of, the contemporary place of women in British society.' - Chelsea Phillips-Carr, cléo
