= A Bouquet of Barbed Wire =

A Bouquet of Barbed Wire may refer to:

- Bouquet of Barbed Wire (novel), a 1969 novel by Andrea Newman
- Bouquet of Barbed Wire a 1976 and 2010 TV series based on the novel by Andrea Newman
- "A Bouquet of Barbed Wine", a 1991 episode of Minder TV series
