= Raymond Sargent =

British actor (1952–2008)

- Born: Leslie Raymond Thomas; 2 October 1952; Poole, Dorset, England
- Died: 9 March 2008 (aged 55)
- Occupations: Actor, musician and dramatist
- Spouse: Julia Thomas
- Website: http://www.raymondsargent.com

Raymond Sargent (born Leslie Raymond Thomas, 2 October 1952 – 9 March 2008) was an English actor, musician and dramatist known for his one man show Two Victorian Tales.

== Early life ==
Sargent was born in the town of Poole and studied at the Mountview Theatre School in London.

== Career ==
As an actor, he performed in shows including The Resistible Rise of Arturo Ui at Everyman Theatre, Liverpool in 1968 and Rhinoceros and The Beaux' Stratagem at the Nuffield Theatre, Southampton. He toured the UK in Tomfoolery, The Hollow Crown, and A Bedfull of Foreigners, and of Buddy: The Buddy Holly Story playing the saxophone and the role of Norman Petty.

He had small parts in television programmes including The Two Ronnies, Blake's 7 and Doctor Who.

=== Solo performance ===
Sargent created several one man shows. His adaptation of The Three Strangers by Thomas Hardy premiered at the 1990 Thomas Hardy Festival, which celebrated the author's 150th birthday, and later became second half of a show called Two Victorian Tales, bundled with his interpretation of The Signalman by Charles Dickens. Originally conceived for four actors, because of lack of funding he made it a solo show. He toured Two Victorian Tales to theatres and arts centres across the UK.

He also toured two shows about T.E. Lawrence, The Warrior and the Poet, about Lawrence's later years, and Amateurs All about the Lawrence's relationship with Hardy.

Sargent was also a folk dance caller and ceilidh dancer, working on the choreography of the folk dances in London Weekend Television's adaptation of Hardy's The Mayor of Casterbridge.

He was a self-taught musician, playing the saxophone, recorder, and several other instruments, composing music for his one-man shows and contributing to projects such as New Music for the River Stour. He played in a medieval trio and in a ceilidh band.

He read for BBC Radio 4's Poetry Please.

== Personal life and death ==
He was married to Julia Thomas, they had one daughter. Sargent died of stomach cancer on 9 March 2008.
