= Neil Dickson =

English actor

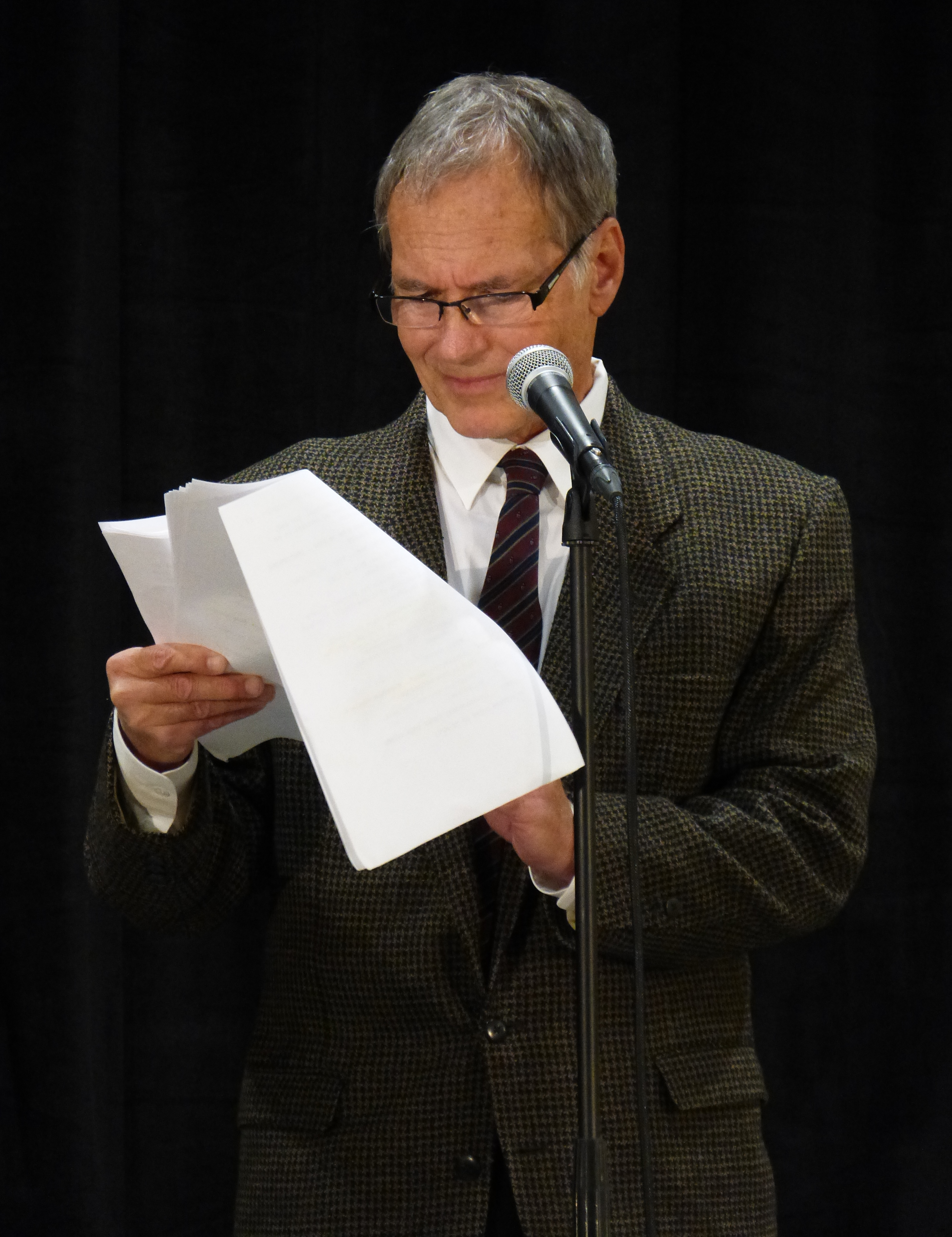
- Neil Dickson in 2015
- Born: 26 November 1950 (age 75)
- Occupations: Actor, voice actor
- Years active: 1975–present
- Spouse: Lynda
- Children: 2

Neil Dickson (born 26 November 1950) is an English actor, who has worked extensively in both American and British film and television.

== Biography ==
At the age of five, Dickson contracted polio, but made a complete recovery a year later. He attended Worksop College in Nottinghamshire playing Coriolanus in the Junior Play 1966. He graduated from the Guildhall School of Music and Drama and spent several seasons working in repertory theatres in Sheffield, Manchester, Leicester and Oxford among others.

== Career ==
In 1975, he made his West End debut in The Gay Lord Quex, opposite Judi Dench, which was directed by Sir John Gielgud at the Albery Theatre.

While playing Dean Rebel in Trafford Tanzi at London's Mermaid Theatre, he was spotted by the producers of the NBC mini-series A.D., who cast him in the lead role of Valerius. He spent the following nine months on location in Tunisia working opposite James Mason, Susan Sarandon, Ava Gardner and Ian McShane. Upon his return, he was cast in the eponymous role of James Bigglesworth in the British feature film, Biggles (American title: Biggles: Adventures in Time), which was selected as the Royal Premiere Film in 1986. He went on to star in several mini-series and the cult sci-fi series She-Wolf of London, which was given the alternative title Love & Curses when syndicated in the United States. In 2008, he starred in the film Chasing Chekhov, which won the first BAFTA LA Film Festival Award.

TV credits include: I, Claudius, Secret Army, Blake's 7, Airline, Boon, Rockliffe's Babies, She-Wolf of London, Dynasty, Matlock, Baywatch, Sliders, Iron Man, Diagnosis: Murder, Alias, Mad Men and 1987 TV movie The Murders in the Rue Morgue.

Film credits include Biggles and Romy and Michele's High School Reunion. He also appeared alongside Barbara Windsor, Joss Ackland and Gareth Hunt in the Pet Shop Boys film, It Couldn't Happen Here, Lionheart, David Lynch's Inland Empire, King of the Wind, Ridley Scott's Body of Lies and Charles Dennis's The Favour of Your Company and Chicanery. He played Nick in Barbara Taylor Bradford's Voice of the Hear alongside Lindsay Wagner and Victoria Tennant.

In 2011 Dickson played the eponymous role in Charles Dennis's award-winning film Atwill. He reprised the role of fugitive British assassin Clive Atwill in the web series Atwill at Large and in the 2018 feature film Barking Mad. Dickson and the other actors won the Best Ensemble Cast award at the 2021 Studio City Film Festival.

Dickson's game credits include Eternal Darkness, Age of Empires III, Heroes of Might and Magic V: Hammers of Fate, and The Elder Scrolls V: Skyrim.

== Personal life ==
Dickson currently resides with his wife Lynda and their two daughters, Lucy and Chloë, in Los Angeles.

== Filmography ==
=== Films ===
==== Live-action roles ====
Year	Film	Role	Director	Notes
1986	Biggles	James "Biggles" Bigglesworth	John Hough	
1987	Lionheart	King Richard	Franklin J. Schaffner	
1987	Eat the Rich	Gerry	Peter Richardson	
1987	It Couldn't Happen Here	Pilot; Car Salesman	Jack Bond	
1990	King of the Wind	Earl of Godolphin	Peter Duffell	
1996	First Strike	Australian Group #2	Stanley Tong	
1997	Romy and Michele's High School Reunion	Boutique Manager	David Mirkin	
1998	Something to Believe In	John	John Hough	Credited as Neil Dixon (sic)
2002	The Story of O: Untold Pleasures	Sir Stephen	Phil Leirness	
2003	Peak Experience	Dr. Cameron Beale	Anthony Adams	
2003	Timecop 2: The Berlin Decision	Johnson	Steve Boyum	Direct-to-video release
2004	Spectres	Walter	Phil Leirness	
2006	Caffeine	Mr. Davies	John Cosgrove	
2006	Inland Empire	Producer	David Lynch	
2009	Donna on Demand	Tony	Corbin Bernsen	Direct-to-video release
2010	The Favour of Your Company	Nigel Shepherd	Charles Dennis	Short film
2011	The Search for Michael Rockefeller	Self	Fraser Clarke Heston	Documentary
2011	Atwill	Atwill	Charles Dennis	Short film
2011	Serenity House	Dr. Lyle Talbot	Judd Pillot	Short film
2012	Jewtopia	Claude	Bryan Fogel	
2012	Soul Cat Confession	Henry Putnam	A. J. D'Agostino	Short film
2013	Shakespeare in Watts	Self	Mel Stuart	Short film
2013	Sons of Liberty	Allister Salinger	Drew Hall	
2013	Complicity	Mr. Allusen	C. B. Harding	
2013	Smokin'	Mike	Oliver Cowley	Short film
2014	The Exorcism Diaries	Father Censula	Scott McCullough	Short film
2014	Haunting of the Innocent	Erik	Matt Hish	
2014	Atlas Shrugged Part III: Who Is John Galt?	Dr. Robert Stadler	J. James Manera	
2014	Playing It Forward	Self	Keith Pepperell and Dave Ross	
2015	At the Seashore	David Welles	Martin Gradek	Short film
2016	The Comet		Andrew J. Cooke	Short film
2017	Chicanery	Gareth Foyle	Charles Dennis	
2018	Atomic Apocalypse	The Ranger	Martin Gooch	
2019	Credit	Michael	Colburn South	Short film
2021	Barking Mad	Clive Atwill	Charles Dennis	
2022	Titanic 666	Mr. Wick	Nick Lyon	
2023	The Quantum Devil	Dr. Richard Cernovich	Larry Wade Carrell	
2023	Love & Consent	Justice Collins	Marcus J. Freed	Short film
2024	Scrambled	Roman	Leah McKendrick	

==== Voice roles ====
Year(s)	Title	Role(s)	Director	Notes
2006	Garfield: A Tail of Two Kitties	Voice	Tim Hill	
2006	A Good Year	Voice	Ridley Scott	
2006	Eragon	Voice	Stefen Fangmeier	
2007	Beowulf	Voice	Robert Zemeckis	
2008	Chasing Chekhov	George; Mikhail	Peter Sands	Short film
2008	Body of Lies	BBC Newsreader	Ridley Scott	Uncredited
2008	Immigrants	Tattoo Guy (in English dubbed version)	Gábor Csupó	
2011	Dragons: Gift of the Night Fury	Viking 2	Tom Owens	
2012	The Yummy Gummy Search for Santa	Harry (in English dubbed version)	Bernie Denk, Rick Jones, and Jürgen Korduletsch	
2019	Missing Link	Doctor Roylott	Chris Butler	

=== Television ===
==== Live-action roles ====
Year(s)	Title	Role(s)	Notes
1976	Crown Court	Jury Foreman	3 episodes
1976	I, Claudius	Guard	S1E7 "Queen of Heaven"
1977	Two Stars for Comfort	Tom	TV movie
1977	Secret Army	Phillips	S1E1 "Lisa - Codename Yvette"
1978	Tycoon	Malcolm	S1E5 "Anything But the Truth"
1979–1980	The Mallens	John Bensham	6 episodes
1981	ITV Playhouse	Phil Steele	S13E3 "Only a Game"
1981	Blake's 7	Avandir	S4E3 "Traitor"
1982	Airline	Starmer	S1E7 "Not Much of a Life"; S1E8 "Officers and Gentlemen"
1983	The Winds of War	Peters; Radio Operator	S1E4 "Defiance"
1985	A.D.	Valerius	5 episodes
1986	Sins	Hubert De Ville	3 episodes
1986	Splash	Self	June 10, 1986 episode
1986	The Murders in the Rue Morgue	Adolphe Le Bon	TV movie
1987	Dynasty	Gavin Maurier	3 episodes
1987	A Hazard of Hearts	Nicholas	TV movie
1988	Freedom Fighter	Rudi Donner	TV movie
1988	Rockliffe's Babies	Tooley	S2E8 "Black Arrow"
1988	Boon	Eddie Allen	S3E5 "Beef Encounter"
1988–1991	Matlock	Anthony Stewart; Tom Neville	3 episodes
1989	Voice of the Heart	Nick Latimer	TV movie
1989	CBS Summer Playhouse	Cooper	S3E10 "Outpost"
1990	A Ghost in Monte Carlo	Dupuis	TV movie
1990	The World of Eddie Weary	Raymond Knight	TV movie
1990–1991	She-Wolf of London	Ian Matheson	Main role; 20 episodes
1993	Acapulco H.E.A.T.	Green Victory Agent	S1E5 "Code Name: Strange Bedfellows"
1993	Tarzán	Vladimir Rostov	S3E13 "Tarzan and the Russian Invasion"
1995	Baywatch	Robert	S5E21 "The Runaways"
1996	Night Stand with Dick Dietrick	Francis DeMule	S1E48 "American Probe"
1997	Sliders	Col. Angus Rickman	4 episodes
1997	Sharpe	Uxbridge	S5E3 "Sharpe's Waterloo"
1997	Nash Bridges	David Laughton Adams	S3E12 "Dirty Tricks"
1998	Mike Hammer, Private Eye	Serge Borkmann	S2E3 "The Art of Murder"
1998	Diagnosis: Murder	Dr. Arthur Holbine	S5E21 "First Do No Harm"
2000	Martial Law	Dr. Avery Dekker	S2E18 "The Thrill Is Gone"
2000	Starhunter	Major Wayne Bartlett	S1E4 "Siren's Song"
2001	Alias	FTL Operative John Smythe	S1E6 "Reckoning"
2007	Chuck	MI-6 Agent	S1E3 "Chuck Versus the Tango"
2009	Mad Men	Harold Ford	S3E6 "Guy Walks Into an Advertising Agency"; S3E10 "The Color Blue"
2013	Bad Samaritans	Silver Fox	S1E1 "Pilot"
2013	A Snow Globe Christmas	Frank	TV movie
2014	You're the Worst	Nestor	S1E1 "Pilot"
2015	Actors Entertainment	Self	S7E65 "ActorsE Chat with Neil Dickson and Cerris Morgan-Moyer"
2017	Atwill at Large	Clive Atwill	Main role; 5 episodes
2017	Twin Peaks	George Bautzer	S3E2 "Part 2"
2017	The Orville	Man in Clerical Garb	S1E12 "Mad Idolatry"

==== Voice roles ====
Year(s)	Title	Role(s)	Notes
1994	Iron Man	Various voices	11 episodes
1995–1996	Gargoyles	Various voices	7 episodes
1996	What a Cartoon!	Various voices	S1E26 "Gramps"
1996	The Real Adventures of Jonny Quest	Various voices	S1E17 "The Spectre of the Pine Barrens"
1996	Aaahh!!! Real Monsters	Various voices	S3E8 "You Only Scare Twice/Less Talk, More Monsters"
1998	I Am Weasel	Banana	S2E12 "My Friend, the Smart Banana"
1999–2003	The Wild Thornberrys	Various voices	3 episodes
2002	Whatever Happened to... Robot Jones?	Dale Lockman	S1E6 "Pilot/Electric Boogaloo/The Groovesicle"
2002	Rugrats	Sir Cedric	S9E4 "The Perfect Twins"
2004	Megas XLR	Warlock	S2E6 "Space Booty"
2016–2018	Dragons: Race to the Edge	Various voices	9 episodes
2020	Wizards: Tales of Arcadia	Various voices	3 episodes
2022	Ms. Marvel	Radio Announcer	S1E5 "Time and Again"

=== Music videos ===
Year	Song	Artist	Director	Role	Notes
1987	"Always on My Mind"	Pet Shop Boys	Jack Bond	Pilot	

=== Video games ===
Year	Title	Role	Notes
1995	Solar Eclipse	"Buzzard" Lt. Hogan	
1995	Disney's Animated Storybook: Pocahontas	Voice	
1998	Titanic Explorer	Various voices	
1999	Revenant	Locke D'Averam (voice)	
2002	Medal of Honor: Frontline	Voice	Credited as Neal Dickson (sic)
2002	Neverwinter Nights	Various voices	
2002	Eternal Darkness: Sanity's Requiem	Dr. Edward Roivas (voice)	
2004	James Bond 007: Everything or Nothing	Voice	
2005	Medal of Honor: European Assault	Voice	
2005	Age of Empires III	Warrick (voice)	
2005	Agatha Christie: And Then There Were None	William Blore (voice)	
2006	The Lord of the Rings: The Battle for Middle-earth II	Rohirrim (voice)	
2006	Full Spectrum Warrior: Ten Hammers	Voice	
2006	Heroes of Might and Magic V	Various voices	
2006	Eragon	Voice	
2006	The Lord of the Rings: The Battle for Middle-earth II: The Rise of the Witch-king	Rohirrim (voice)	
2007	Bladestorm: The Hundred Years' War	King of France	
2011	The Elder Scrolls V: Skyrim	Various voices	
2011	Star Wars: The Old Republic	Various voices	
2016	Far Cry Primal	Various voices	
2016	Watch Dogs 2	Jim Lin (voice)	
2019	Call of Duty: Modern Warfare	Voice	
