= Sheila Allen (English actress) =

English actress (1932–2011)

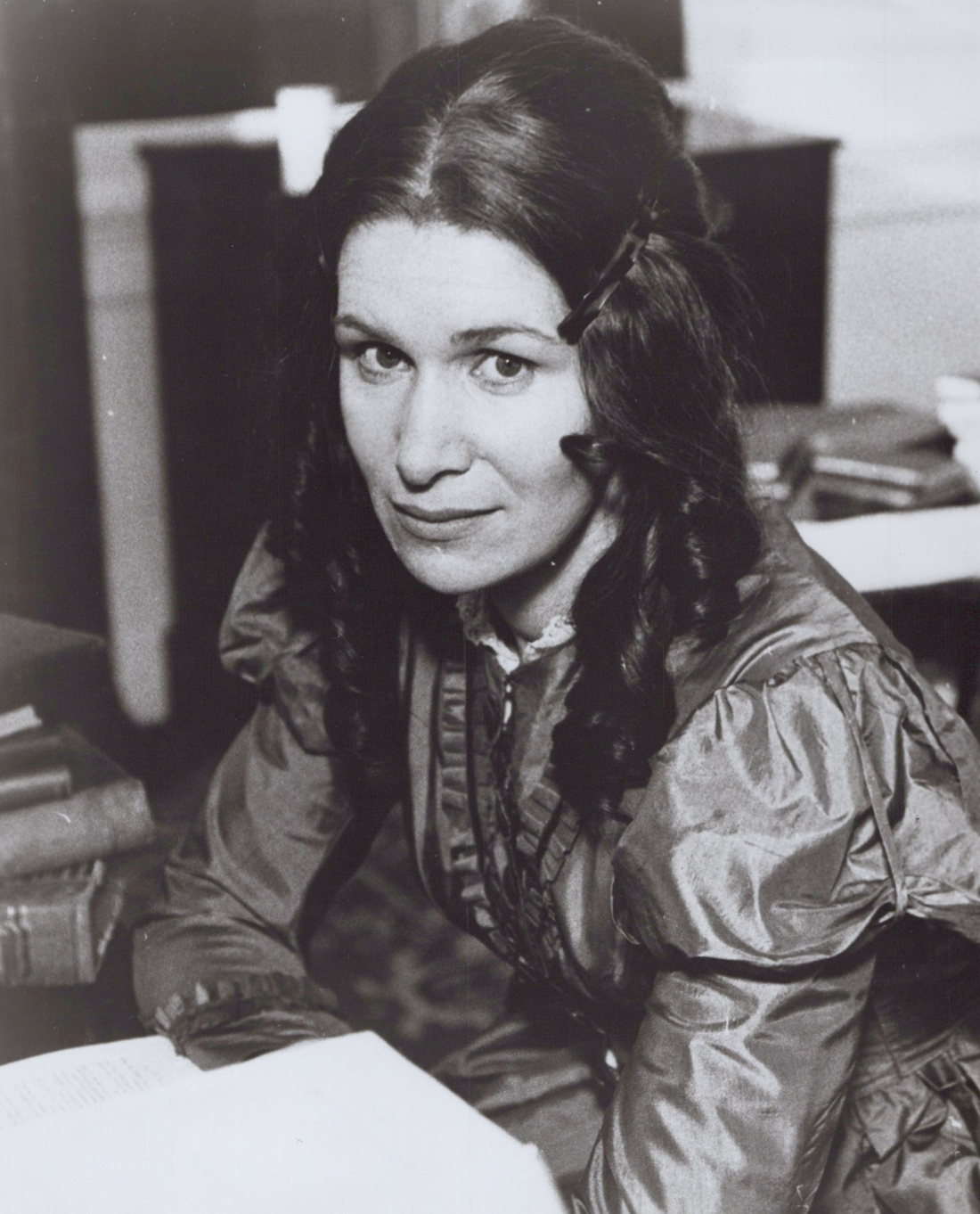
- Allen as Mary Anne Evans in 1971
- Born: 22 October 1932; Chard, Somerset, England
- Died: 13 October 2011 (aged 78); London, England
- Occupation: Actress
- Spouse: David Jones (married 1964 – ?)
- Children: Jesse and Joe

Sheila Allen (22 October 1932 – 13 October 2011) was an English actress, who was best known to the wider public for her role on television as Cassie Manson in Bouquet of Barbed Wire and its sequel Another Bouquet (1976–77). From 1966 to 1978, Allen was a member of the Royal Shakespeare Company.

== Early life and stage work ==
Allen was born in Chard, Somerset, to Dorothy Essex (née Potter) and William Allen. She was educated at Howell’s School, Denbigh and trained at the Royal Academy of Dramatic Art (RADA) from 1949 to 1951.

From the 1950s, Allen appeared in plays by Shakespeare. Her first leading role was that of Katherine ("the shrew") in The Taming of the Shrew for the Arena Company in Birmingham (1954–56). Among many other Shakespearean roles, she played Hippolyta in A Midsummer Night's Dream with the Bristol Old Vic Company, a production that moved to London (1957–58) and Portia (The Merchant of Venice, Old Vic, London, 1962). She joined the Royal Shakespeare Company at The Aldwych in 1966. Her roles included Lady Percy (Henry IV, Parts I and II) (RSC, Stratford, 1966), Lady Macduff (Macbeth, RSC, Stratford and London, 1968), Lady Capulet (Romeo and Juliet, RSC, Stratford, 1967), and Helen (Troilus and Cressida, RSC, Stratford, 1968). For the RSC, she played Goneril in King Lear twice, in 1968 and 1974, for respectively Trevor Nunn and Buzz Goodbody. At the Shaw Theatre, London in 1973, she played Lady Macbeth, with Tom Baker as Macbeth.

Allen appeared in new plays as well, such as Pam Gems Queen Christina which debuted at the RSC's Other Place in 1977. In his obituary of Allen in 2011, Michael Billington considered it "the role of a lifetime and enabled her to inspire comparisons to [Greta] Garbo in her ability to capture the cross-dressing monarch's sexual ambivalence and inner contest between desire and duty."

== Television and film ==
Allen appeared in guest roles with Patrick McGoohan in episodes of Danger Man ("Don't Nail Him Yet", 1964) and The Prisoner ("A. B. and C.", 1967). In the episode of The Prisoner, Allen was Number 14, a scientist who was one of many who failed in "the Village" to elicit from Number 6 (McGoohan) why he had resigned from a certain organisation. She was pressed by Number 2 (Colin Gordon) to use a new wonder drug and archive film to influence her subject's dreams, but he was able to manipulate the process and thereby to cause the downfall of Number 2. When not dressed in her subterranean laboratory in a white coat with her hair tied back, Number 14 was seen with flowing hair, walking around the Village in a cape of many colours.

In Bouquet of Barbed Wire (1976), based on a novel by Andrea Newman and described by Philip Purser as a "kinky saga which was much discussed ... well made and acted", Allen's character was the wife of Peter Manson (Frank Finlay), who had an unhealthy obsession about his married daughter, Prue (Susan Penhaligon). Among many sexual entanglements, Cassie had an affair with Gavin Sorenson (James Aubrey), her own son-in-law. She also portrayed the Matron Mary Taylor in the television series Shroud for a Nightingale (1984), based on the P.D. James novel.

Her many film credits include The Prince and the Pauper (1962), Children of the Damned (1964), The Alphabet Murders (1965), Three into Two Won't Go (1969), Venom (1971), The Other Side of the Underneath (1972), Pascali's Island (1988), Shining Through (1992), Love Actually (2003) and Harry Potter and the Goblet of Fire (2005). Allen continued to work into the 21st century, and taught at the Guildford School of Acting.

== Death ==
Allen died in London on 13 October 2011, aged 78.

== Filmography ==
=== Film ===
Year	Title	Role	Notes
1955	Confession	Minor role	Uncredited
1956	The Fourpenny Box	Ann Vellacott	TV film
1958	The Castiglioni Brothers	Gisa	TV film
1964	Children of the Damned	Diana Looran	
1965	The Alphabet Murders	Lady Diane	
1969	Three into Two Won't Go	Beth	
1971	Venom	Ellen	
1972	The Other Side of the Underneath	Meg the Peg	
1988	Pascali's Island	Mrs. Marchant	
1992	Shining Through	Olga Leiner	
1996	The Ring	Frau Hedwig	TV film
2003	Love Actually	Jamie's Mum	
2005	Harry Potter and the Goblet of Fire	Ministry Witch #1	

=== Television ===
Year	Title	Role	Notes
1955	BBC Sunday Night Theatre	Special Nurse	Episode: "A Dream of Treason"
1956	The Crime of the Century	Flag Girl	Episode: "Taffy"
1958	Charlesworth at Large	Miss Carter	Episode: "Loads Sometimes Shift"
1959	The Four Just Men	Marie Clement	Episode: "The Godfather"
1959	Playhouse 90	Iris	Episode: "Dark as the Night"
1959	The Flying Doctor	Mrs. Forbes	Episode: "Woman Hunt"
1959	Armchair Theatre	Various roles	5 episodes
1960	Knight Errant Limited	Flo	Episode: "The Last of the Saracens"
1960	The Four Just Men	Isle	Episode: "The Man Who Wasn't There"
1960	The Edgar Wallace Mystery Theater	Frau Kornfeldt	Episode: "The Malpas Mystery"
1960	Theatre 70	Mrs. Rose Elliot	Episode: "The Man Condemned"
1960	ITV Play of the Week	Stella Morrisey	Episode: "A Leap in the Dark"
1961	ITV Play of the Week	Rhiannon Morris	Episode: "Then We Fall"
1961	Armchair Theatre	Margaret Granick	Episode: "The Hero"
1961	BBC Sunday-Night Play	Marion Lucas	Episode: "The Mather Story"
1962	Disneyland	Princess Mary	3 episodes
1963	BBC Sunday-Night Play	Laura Howard	Episode: "The Affair"
1963	BBC Sunday-Night Play	Christine	Episode: "For Tea on Sunday"
1964	Story Parade	Julika Stiller	Episode: "Condemned to Acquital"
1964	Drama 61-67	Josie Silver	Episode: "Drama '64: The Trouble with England"
1964	Danger Man	Dian	Episode: "Don't Nail Him Yet"
1965	Gideon's Way	Mary Calloway	Episode: "The Alibi Man"
1966	Sunday Night	Ruth	Episode: "The Quarry: Portrait of a Man as a Paralysed Artist"
1966	Theatre 625	Anna	Episode: "The Twelfth Hour
1967	The Prisoner	Number Fourteen	Episode: "A. B. and C."
1969	Omnibus	Marian Evans	Episode: "The Confessions of Marian Evans/George Eliot"
1970	Z-Cars	Sheila Ashton	Episode: "A Lot of Fuss for Fifteen Quid"
1971	Public Eye	Barbara Lewson-Jones	Episode: "Shades of White"
1972	The Regiment	Truus Meyer	Episode: "Dragon's Teeth"
1972	Thirty-Minute Theatre	Liz	Episode: "Too Far"
1972	BBC Play of the Month	Jocasta	Episode: "King Oedipus"
1972	Play for Today	Veronica	Episode: "Triple Exposure"
1972	Play for Today	Angela	Episode: "The Bankrupt"
1973	Z-Cars	Vera Marshall	Episode: "Jack the Dodger"
1973	Wessex Tales	Lady Grebe	Episode: "Barbara of the House of Grebe"
1974	Shoulder to Shoulder	Mrs. Pethick-Lawrence	Miniseries
1974	Omnibus	Frieda	Episode: "Kafka's Castle"
1974	Omnibus	Olivia	Episode: "Find Me"
1975-1982	Crown Court	Helen Montgomery QC	6 episodes
1976	Bouquet of Barbed Wire	Cassie Manson	Miniseries
1977	Jackanory Playhouse	Queen Liza	Episode: "The Princess and the Hedgehog"
1977	Another Bouquet	Cassie Manson	Miniseries
1979	ITV Playhouse	Celia	Episode: "Getting in on Concorde"
1980	The Assassination Run	Louisa - Marquesa de Triana	2 episodes
1981	BBC2 Playhouse	Lady Redesdale	Episode: "Unity"
1982	Dick Turpin	Magyari	Episode: "The Secret Folk"
1984	Shroud for a Nightingale	Matron Mary Taylor	Miniseries
1984	The Glory Boys	Mrs. Sokarev	1 episode
1986	The Life and Loves of a She-Devil	Fiona	1 episode
1987	Boon	Phyllis Nichols	Episode: "Wheels of Fortune"
1987	Screen Two	Virginia	Episode: "Hedgehog Wedding"
1989	Agatha Christie's Poirot	Mrs. Clapperton	Episode: "Problem at Sea"
1989	Act of Will	Dulcie Sedgewick	1 episode
1990	Screenplay	Tutor	Episode: "Antonia and Jane"
1991	Casualty	Marcia Parrish	Episode: "Something to Hide"
1992	The Old Devils	Rhiannon Weaver	Miniseries
1995	Dangerfield	Mrs. Norland	Episode: "The Call Girl"
1997	Screen Two	Eileen	Episode: "Mothertime"
2003	Doctors	Marianne Stael	Episode: "Fugue State"
