= Wessex Tales =

1888 story collection by Thomas Hardy

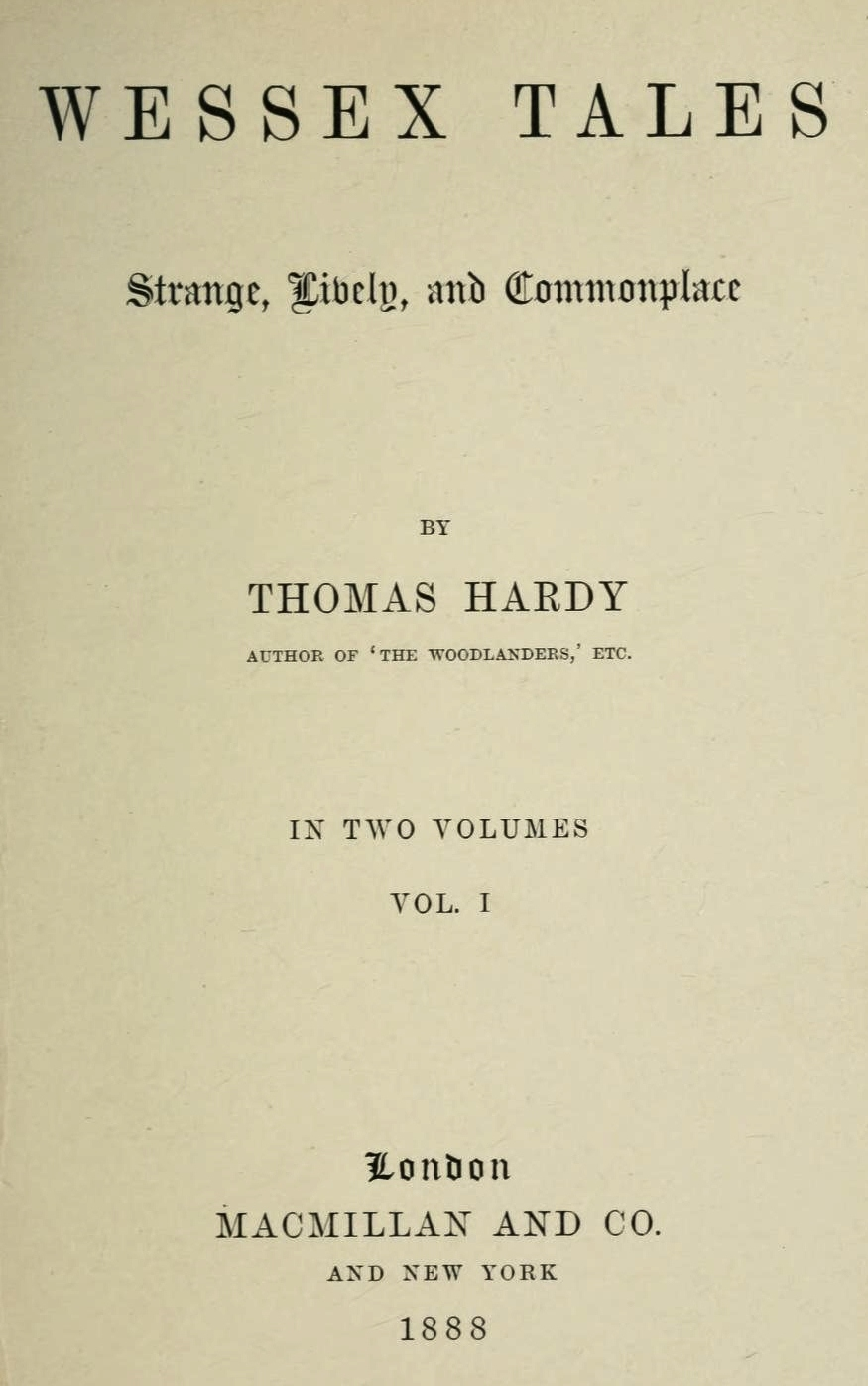
First edition title page

Wessex Tales is an 1888 collection of tales written by English novelist and poet Thomas Hardy, many of which are set before Hardy's birth in 1840.

In the various short stories, Hardy writes of the true nature of nineteenth-century marriage and its inherent restrictions, the use of grammar as a diluted form of thought, the disparities created by the role of class status in determining societal rank, the stance of women in society and the severity of even minor diseases causing the rapid onset of fatal symptoms prior to the introduction of sufficient medicinal practices. A focal point of all the short stories is that of social constraints acting to diminish one's contentment in life, necessitating unwanted marriages, repression of true emotion and succumbing to melancholia due to constriction within the confines of 19th-century perceived normalcy.

== Contents ==
Initially, in 1888, the collection contained five stories, all previously published in periodicals:

- "The Three Strangers" (1883)
- "The Withered Arm" (1888)
- "Fellow-Townsmen" (1880)
- "Interlopers at the Knap" (1884)
- "The Distracted Preacher" (1879)

For the 1896 reprinting, Hardy added a sixth...

- "An Imaginative Woman" (1894)

However, in 1912 he reversed that decision, moving "An Imaginative Woman" to another collection, Life's Little Ironies (1894), while at the same time transferring two of the latter collection's stories, "A Tradition of Eighteen Hundred and Four" (1882) and "The Melancholy Hussar of the German Legion" (1890), to Wessex Tales, for a final total of seven stories.

== Dramatic adaptations ==
=== Television ===
Six of the short stories were adapted as television dramas in 1973, forming the BBC2 anthology series Wessex Tales:

- "The Withered Arm" (7 November 1973, BBC2), adapted by Rhys Adrian, directed by Desmond Davis, and starring Billie Whitelaw.
- "Fellow-Townsmen" (14 November 1973, BBC2), adapted by Douglas Livingstone, directed by Barry Davis, and starring Jane Asher.
- "A Tragedy of Two Ambitions" (21 November 1973, BBC2), adapted by Dennis Potter, directed by Michael Tuchner, and starring John Hurt. This story is from Hardy's collection Life's Little Ironies.
- "An Imaginative Woman" (28 November 1973, BBC2), adapted by William Trevor, directed by Gavin Millar, and starring Claire Bloom.
- "The Melancholy Hussar" (5 December 1973, BBC2), adapted by Ken Taylor, directed by Mike Newell, and starring Ben Cross.
- "Barbara of the House of Grebe" (12 December 1973 BBC2), adapted by David Mercer, directed by David Jones, and starring Nick Brimble and Ben Kingsley. This story is from Hardy's collection A Group of Noble Dames.

=== Radio ===
"The Withered Arm" was adapted as an audio drama by Louise Doughty that was broadcast on BBC Radio 4 in February 2006, starring Victoria Hamilton and Susan Jameson.
