= Ray Pitt =

- Occupation: Editor
- Years active: 1936-1950

Ray Pitt was a British film editor who spent much of his career at Ealing Studios working on films such as the George Formby comedy vehicles Come On George! (1939) and Spare a Copper (1940) as well as on more serious productions such as the Second World War film Convoy (1940). He later worked at Hammer Films.

== Selected filmography ==
- Calling the Tune (1936)
- Dreams Come True (1936)
- Secret Lives (1937)
- The Girl in the Taxi (1937)
- Brief Ecstasy (1937)
- I've Got a Horse (1938)
- What a Man! (1938)
- Let's Be Famous (1939)
- There Ain't No Justice (1939)
- Cheer Boys Cheer (1939)
- Come On George! (1939)
- Saloon Bar (1940)
- The Proud Valley (1940)
- The Goose Steps Out (1942)
- A Gunman Has Escaped (1948)
- Man in Black (1949)
- Meet Simon Cherry (1949)

== Bibliography ==
- Barr, Charles. Ealing Studios. University of California Press, 1998.
