= The Story of O: Untold Pleasures =

- Directed by: Phil Leirness
- Written by: Phil Leirness; Dominique Aury
- Based on: Story of O by Pauline Réage
- Produced by: Christopher Clark; Pierre-Richard Muller; Ron Norman
- Starring: Max Parrish; Neil Dickson; Danielle Ciardi
- Release date: October 11, 2002
- Language: English

The Story of O: Untold Pleasures is a 2002 erotic film.

== Plot ==
A man known as Sir Stephen guides O., a young photographer in her 20s, into a seductive new world of eroticism.

== Cast ==
- Danielle Ciardi as O
- Neil Dickson as Sir Stephen
- Max Parrish as Rene
- Michelle Ruben as Jaqueline
- Katherine Randolph as Natalie
- Nadejda Klein as Mother

== Reviews ==
CineVue wrote "If the cast don't look like they are having fun, how can the viewer be expected to? What The Story of O: Untold Pleasures needs is a little bit more tickle to go with all that slap.

AllMovie rated The Story of O: Untold Pleasures one star out of five.

== See also ==
- Story of O
- Story of O: Chapter 2
