= Meet Simon Cherry =

1949 British film by Godfrey Grayson

- Opening title card
- Directed by: Godfrey Grayson
- Written by: Godfrey Grayson; A. R. Rawlinson; Gale Pedrick (radio plays)
- Produced by: Anthony Hinds
- Starring: Hugh Moxey; Jeanette Tregarthen; Anthony Forwood; John Bailey
- Cinematography: Cedric Williams
- Edited by: Ray Pitt
- Music by: Rupert Grayson; Frank Spencer
- Production company: Hammer Films
- Distributed by: Exclusive Films (UK)
- Release date: January 1950 (UK)
- Running time: 67 minutes
- Country: United Kingdom
- Language: English

Meet Simon Cherry is a 1949 British second feature ('B') mystery film directed by Godfrey Grayson and starring Hugh Moxey. The screenplay was by Grayson and A. R. Rawlinson based on the BBC radio series Meet the Rev by Gale Pedrick, featuring the crime solving cleric. The film was originally to be called Meet the Rev, but when the film was trade shown on 22 November 1949, the title was changed. It was released theatrically in January 1950. Hammer had intended to produce a series of Simon Cherry films, but cancelled the project after this first film failed to become a hit.

== Plot ==
When the Rev. Simon ("The Rev") Cherry sets off for a much needed holiday, his car breaks down in a storm and he is forced to stay overnight in a manor house belonging to Lady Harling. The following morning, the body of Lady Harling's invalid daughter Lisa Colville is discovered, apparently murdered, and the Rev must bring his crime solving skills to the case. Lisa's cousin Henry accuses Lisa's husband Alan of murdering her. Simon later discovers that the young woman actually was not murdered but rather died from a heart attack, which comes as a relief to the Harling family.

== Cast ==
- Hugh Moxey as Simon Cherry, "The Rev"
- Jeannette Tregarthen as Monica Harling
- Anthony Forwood as Alan Colville
- Ernest Butcher as Young
- Zena Marshall as Lisa Colville
- John Bailey as Henry Dantry
- Courtney Hope as Lady Harling
- Arthur Lovegrove as Charlie Banks
- Gerald Case as Smails
- John Arnatt as Tommy

== Critical reception ==
Picturegoer wrote: "The story ... is conventional enough but it is treated without hysterics. Yet it manages to put over quite a reasonable thrill. The acting of the cast as a whole is quite competent."

Picture Show wrote: "It is neatly directed, with the accent on suspense and character rather than noise and speed, and excellently acted."

The Radio Times gave the film one out of five stars, writing: "Hugh Moxey made his screen debut in a feeble story."

Sky Movies gave the film two out of five stars, noting a "a brisk, no-nonsense film version of one of Gale Pedrick's popular stories."

TV Guide called it "competent enough."

Leslie Halliwell said: "Elementary programme filler from a radio story."

In British Sound Films: The Studio Years 1928–1959 David Quinlan rated the film as "average", calling it a "servicable, no-frills version of popular radio serial."
