= Anthony Forwood =

English actor (1915–1988)

- Born: Ernest Lytton Leslie Forwood; 3 October 1915; Weymouth, Dorset, England
- Died: 18 May 1988 (aged 72); London, England
- Occupation: Actor
- Years active: 1935–1956
- Spouse: Glynis Johns (m. 1942; div. 1948)
- Partner: Dirk Bogarde (1949–1988)
- Children: Gareth Forwood
- Relatives: Sir Arthur Forwood, 1st Baronet (great-uncle); Sir William Bower Forwood (great-uncle)

Ernest Lytton Leslie Forwood (3 October 1915 – 18 May 1988), known professionally as Anthony Forwood, was an English actor.

== Early life ==
Ernest Lytton Leslie Forwood was born on 3 October 1915 in Weymouth, Dorset. The Forwood family were landed gentry; Forwood's great-grandfather, Thomas Friend Brittain Peploe Forwood, resided in Thornton Manor in Cheshire and was the forefather of the Forwood Baronetcy. Forwood's great-uncles were English merchants, shipowners and politicians Sir Arthur Forwood, 1st Baronet and Sir William Bower Forwood; his father was Leslie Langton Forwood, a captain in the Royal Navy.

== Career ==
After years of theatre, including the revue This World of Ours in 1935; Forwood gained his first film acting role in 1949, when he starred in Ralph Thomas' Traveller's Joy. That same year he appeared in the thriller The Man in Black with Sid James.

In 1952, he received a number of roles including Appointment in London with Dirk Bogarde; he eventually became his life partner and manager. Ralph Thomas, who had directed Forwood in his first film role, directed Bogarde in the comedy Doctor in the House and several of its sequels.

Forwood appeared with Boris Karloff in the mystery Colonel March Investigates and played Will Scarlet in The Story of Robin Hood and His Merrie Men (1952). One year later he acted in the Oscar-nominated Knights of the Round Table, a film starring such high-profile actors as Robert Taylor, Ava Gardner and Stanley Baker, and in Terence Fisher's Mantrap (1953). His last role came in 1956 in Colonel March of Scotland Yard.

== Personal life ==
In 1942, Forwood married actress Glynis Johns, but they divorced in 1948. Their only child was actor Gareth Forwood (1945–2007).

Forwood later lived with his long-term partner, actor Dirk Bogarde, in Amersham, England, and then in France before the couple returned to England shortly before Forwood died in London in 1988.

== Death ==
By 1987, Forwood was dying of liver cancer and Parkinson's disease. At this time Bogarde, a heavy smoker, had a minor stroke. On 18 May 1988, Forwood died aged 72 in Kensington and Chelsea, London. His body was cremated.

== Filmography ==
| Year | Title | Role | Notes |
|---|---|---|---|
| 1949 | Meet Simon Cherry | Alan Colville | |
| 1949 | The Man in Black | Victor Harrington | |
| 1950 | Traveller's Joy | Nick Rafferty | |
| 1951 | Captain Horatio Hornblower | Lt. Woodford | Uncredited |
| 1951 | Black Widow | Paul Kenton | |
| 1952 | The Story of Robin Hood and His Merrie Men | Will Scarlet | |
| 1952 | The Gambler and the Lady | Lord Peter Willens | |
| 1953 | Appointment in London | Navigation Officer | |
| 1953 | Mantrap | Rex | |
| 1953 | Knights of the Round Table | Gareth | |
| 1954 | Five Days | Peter Glanville | |
| 1954 | Colonel March of Scotland Yard | Jim Hartley | TV series - billed as Anthony Forward |
| 1975 | Permission to Kill | Englishman | (final film role) |
