= Cedric Williams =

British cinematographer

Cedric Williams (30 March 1913 – December 1999) was a British cinematographer.

== Selected filmography ==
- The Fatal Night (1948)
- A Gunman Has Escaped (1948)
- Man in Black (1949)
- Doctor Morelle (1949)
- The Adventures of PC 49 (1949)
- Celia (1949)
- Dick Barton Strikes Back (1949)
- Third Time Lucky (1949)
- Meet Simon Cherry (1949)
- Room to Let (1950)
- The Fake (1953)
- The Flaw (1955)
- The Gelignite Gang (1956)
- Breath of Life (1963)
