= John Harvey (actor) =

English actor (1911–1982)

- in Doctor Who: The War Machines (1966)
- Born: 27 September 1911; London, England
- Died: 19 July 1982 (aged 70); Henley-on-Thames, Oxfordshire, England
- Occupation: Actor
- Years active: 1935–1980
- Spouse: Diana King (m. 1940)

John Harvey (27 September 1911 – 19 July 1982) was an English actor. He appeared in 52 films, two television films and made 70 television guest appearances between 1948 and 1979.

== Career ==
Born in London, England, he began his acting career on the stage in the 1930s as one of the Harry Hanson's Court Players at the Peterborough Repertory. While there, he met the actress Diana King.

Harvey and King were married, remaining together for more than forty years, until his death.

During the Second World War, he was commissioned in the Royal Air Force. Post-war, he performed at the Theatre Royal in Drury Lane, London, for some four years, during the West End runs of Rodgers and Hammerstein's South Pacific and The King and I.

Harvey's film debut was in the role as Eddie in the British crime drama A Gunman Has Escaped (1948), in which he was the leading star. Harvey then moved to character roles and five films later played Inspector Loomis in Hitchcock's Stage Fright (1950) starring Jane Wyman and Richard Todd. His next role was as Bland in the drama Chance of a Lifetime (1950).

Harvey's television debut was as Angelo Verona in the BBC film On the Spot (1948). He played Buster Cox in the United Artists film noir crime/thriller The Man with My Face (1951) starring Barry Nelson.

Among his guest appearances on series television he appeared in the first episode of The Diary of Samuel Pepys (1958). He was cast as Sir William Duffy in Dr. Finlay's Casebook (1962) and two Doctor Who appearances – Professor Brett in The War Machines (1966), and Officia in The Macra Terror (1967), all for the BBC.

John Harvey died at age 70 in Henley-on-Thames, Oxfordshire.

== Selected filmography ==
- Moscow Nights (1935) – Minor role (uncredited)
- Noose (1948) – Mack (uncredited)
- A Gunman Has Escaped (1948) – Eddie Steele
- Dick Barton Strikes Back (1949) – Major Henderson
- Private Angelo (1949) – Cpl. McCunn
- Stage Fright (1950) – Inspector Loomis (uncredited)
- Chance of a Lifetime (1950) – Bland
- Cairo Road (1950) – Maj. Maggourys
- Files from Scotland Yard (1951) – Jim Hardy
- Smart Alec (1951)
- The Dark Light (1951) – Roger
- The Man with My Face (1951) – Buster Cox
- Four Days (1951) – Hammond Stubbs
- Black Widow (1951) – Dr. Wallace
- Lady Godiva Rides Again (1951) – Buller
- High Treason (1951) – Scotland Yard Man
- Angels One Five (1952) – Station Warrant Officer
- Castle in the Air (1952) – Andrews
- The Lost Hours (1952) – Kenneth Peters
- Private's Progress (1956) – RAF Officer at Headquarters (uncredited)
- X the Unknown (1956) – Maj. Cartwright
- True as a Turtle (1957) – First Officer
- The Long Haul (1957) – Supt. Macrea (uncredited)
- Night of the Demon (1957) – Hobart's Brother (uncredited)
- The Man Who Wouldn't Talk (1958) – (uncredited)
- Edge of Fury (1958)
- The 39 Steps (1959) – Detective at Theatre (uncredited)
- Horrors of the Black Museum (1959) – Man in Bookshop
- The Ugly Duckling (1959) – Sergeant Barnes
- The Devil's Disciple (1959) – British officer (uncredited)
- The Stranglers of Bombay (1960) – Burns (uncredited)
- Two-Way Stretch (1960) – Governor Rockhampton Prison
- Hell Is a City (1960) – Fingerprint Officer (uncredited)
- Tunes of Glory (1960) – Sergeant (Bridge Hotel)
- Sea Hunt (1960) – Season 3, Episode 21
- Double Bunk (1961) – Johnnie
- The Phantom of the Opera (1962) – Sgt. Vickers
- The Wrong Arm of the Law (1963) – Police Station Sergeant (uncredited)
- Heavens Above! (1963) – Wilson, Prison Officer (uncredited)
- Kiss of the Vampire (1963) – Police Sergeant
- The Crimson Blade (1963) – Sgt. Grey
- The Old Dark House (1963) – Club Receptionist
- Doomsday at Eleven (1963) – Asst. Commissioner
- Joey Boy (1965) – Signals Officer (uncredited)
- The Psychopath (1966) – Reinhardt Klermer
- The Deadly Bees (1966) – Thompson
- They Came from Beyond Space (1967) – Bill Trethowan
- A Challenge for Robin Hood (1967) – Wallace
- Sacco & Vanzetti (1971) – A. Mitchell Palmer
- The Satanic Rites of Dracula (1973) – Commissionaire
- The Black Windmill (1974) – Heppenstel (uncredited)
- Legend of the Werewolf (1975) – Prefect
- Rollerball (1975) – Directorate Executive (uncredited)
- Rachel and the Beelzebub Bombardiers (1977)
- Le Pétomane (1979)
