= A Gunman Has Escaped =

1948 film

- Directed by: Richard M. Grey
- Written by: John Gilling; Joyce Cairns
- Produced by: Harry Goodman; Richard M. Grey
- Starring: John Harvey; Maria Charles; Jane Arden
- Cinematography: Cedric Williams
- Edited by: Cynthia Henry; Ray Pitt
- Production company: Condor Film Productions
- Distributed by: Monarch Film Corporation
- Release date: 1948
- Running time: 58 minutes
- Country: United Kingdom
- Language: English

A Gunman Has Escaped is a 1948 British second feature ('B') crime film directed by Richard M. Grey and starring John Harvey, Maria Charles and Jane Arden. It was written by John Gilling and Joyce Cairns.

== Plot ==
Soho gang members Eddie, Sinclair and Bill rob a jeweller's shop, and on leaving the premises shoot a passer-by who gets in their way. They flee to the countryside and find temporary work from Cranston, a farmer. Bill falls for Cranston's daughter Jane. When he hears on the radio that their shooting victim has died, Eddie panics, steals the Cranstons' car and forces Bill and Sinclair to go with him. While hiding in woods the three men fight and Sinclair is shot dead by Eddie while running away. Bill escapes from Eddie and makes his way back to the gang's hangout. Eddie arrives shortly afterwards and thinking his girlfriend Goldie has betrayed him to the police, shoots her. Eddie and Bill fight over the gun, the police then arrive and Eddie, knowing it is all over, turns the gun on himself.

== Cast ==
- John Harvey as Eddie Steele
- John Fitzgerald as Sinclair
- Robert Cartland as Bill Grant
- Ernest Brightmore as Johnson
- Maria Chrles as Goldie
- Patrick Westwood as Red
- George Self as Spike
- Manville Tarrant as Alf
- Denis Lehrer as Mike
- Jane Arden as Jane
- Frank Hawkins as Mr. Cranston
- Hope Carr as Mrs. Cranston
- Melville Crawford as Inspector Fenton
- Hatton Duprez as detective

== Production ==
It was shot at the Maida Vale Studios in London and released by the independent distributor Monarch Film Corporation.

== Reception ==
Kine Weekly wrote: "John Hervey has no difficulty in suggesting the cowardly gunman as Eddie and John Fitzgerald and Robert Cartland are effective in contrast as Sinclair and Bill. The film is modestly staged and none of its players is well known, but it nevertheless clearly illustrates the psychology of the killer and puts a real kick into its salient situations and salutory climax."

The Daily Film Renter wrote: "Killer melodrama follows desperate exploits of Soho gangsters on run after jewel hold-up. Straightforward story particularly well acted. English farm sequences have unusual interest. Excitement sometimes weakened by wordy dialogue, but tough shooting situations compensate. Useful popular support."

Picture Show wrote: "Convincing crime melodrama showing how mutual distrust brings about the undoing of three men concerned in theft and murder, There are some somewhat brutal sequences but it is lightened by sardonic humour."
