= It Couldn't Happen Here =

- Theatrical release poster
- Directed by: Jack Bond
- Written by: Jack Bond; James Dillon
- Produced by: Jack Bond; Martin Haxby
- Starring: Neil Tennant; Chris Lowe; Joss Ackland; Neil Dickson; Gareth Hunt; Barbara Windsor
- Production companies: EMI Films; Picture Music International
- Distributed by: Entertainment Film Distributors
- Release date: 8 July 1988
- Running time: 87 minutes
- Country: United Kingdom
- Language: English
- Budget: $4 million

It Couldn't Happen Here is a 1988 musical film starring the British synth-pop duo Pet Shop Boys and based on the music from their first two studio albums Please and Actually. It was originally conceived as an hour-long video based on Actually, but it evolved into a surreal, full-scale feature film directed by Jack Bond and co-starring Barbara Windsor, Joss Ackland, Neil Dickson, and Gareth Hunt.

== Plot ==
In the early morning, dancers are warming up on an English beach (Clacton-on-Sea, Essex), and Neil Tennant appears on a bicycle. The song "It Couldn't Happen Here" is being played. He cycles up to a kiosk, where he buys some postcards from the shopkeeper (Gareth Hunt). The shopkeeper complains about the political faults of the modern world, but Neil ignores him, and writes his postcards.

Meanwhile, Chris Lowe is at a bed and breakfast, throwing the contents of his room into a seemingly bottomless trunk. He runs downstairs and sits waiting for the landlady (Barbara Windsor) to serve breakfast. In the breakfast room, Uncle Dredge (Gareth Hunt) is making bad jokes with a repetitive catch-phrase, bothering other guests, but is submissive to the landlady, who seems to disapprove of everyone except Chris, still sitting dispassionately. When the ridiculously over-size Full English fried breakfast arrives, Chris empties it over the landlady's head and runs out into the street. He runs along the promenade being chased by a group of bikers on motorcycles.

Back at the beach, Neil continues to cycle along the beach. He passes a priest (Joss Ackland) who is reciting verses whilst leading a party of school children. Two of the boys are the Pet Shop Boys at a younger age and they run to the pier (Clacton Pier). In a building on the pier, the adult Neil is seeing an exotically dressed female fortune teller; as he leaves she uncovers her face to reveal that "she" is Chris Lowe (filmed in the West Cliff Theatre bar). The young Neil and Chris (Nicholas and Jonathan Haley) look in a Victorian era Mutoscope and see a short bedroom farce: a slapstick performance featuring a squire (Chris Lowe) and a butler (Neil Tennant) making advances to a French maid (Barbara Windsor) (filmed at the West Cliff Theatre). The priest catches up with the boys and shouts more verses at them. The boys escape into the amusement arcade, where they see a rock star (Neil Tennant) in a gold tasselled suit. Then they pass into a theatre, where they see a group of nuns perform a risqué dance routine to "It's a Sin". The priest catches up with them again and he takes them outside, where it is now evening. On the pier, he commands 12 fishermen to haul a huge cross out of the sea and onto their ship.

The adult Neil and Chris pass three rappers performing "West End Girls" and go to buy a classic car. The salesman (Neil Dickson) insists on presenting his full sales spiel, so Neil and Chris try to interrupt. They pay for the car in cash and drive off, with Chris at the wheel. In the car, the news report on the radio tells of a hitchhiker who has hacked to death three people who have given him lifts. Chris pulls over for a female hitchhiker whom they see on the roadside, but instead an elderly man (Joss Ackland) gets in after a scream and banging is heard. The passenger, who fits the description of the killer from the radio, offers strange and witty anecdotes to questions asked before turning on the radio, which plays "Always on My Mind". During the song, the passenger, with a mad look in his eyes, unpacks several knives from his bag, then suddenly asks to be let out and the Pet Shop Boys continue unharmed.

They arrive at a transport café, where they are sat next to a traveller (Gareth Hunt). Whilst "Love Comes Quickly" plays on the jukebox, they order an inappropriate gourmet meal, but the waitress does not flinch. At another table, a pilot (Neil Dickson, more or less reprising his lead role in Biggles), fiddles frustratedly with a hand-held computer game that says "divided by... divided by... zero" (taking lyrics from "Two Divided by Zero"). A voice from the traveller's briefcase asks to be let out and the traveller does so, revealing a ventriloquist's dummy. The dummy starts philosophising about the concept of time. He asks whether time can be likened to a teacup in that a teacup is no longer a teacup if no one has the intention to use it as such. To shut him up, Neil puts a record on the jukebox ("Rent") and the wall of the café rises to reveal some dancers.

Meanwhile, the pilot is seen back in his office reading W. H. Newton-Smith's book The Structure of Time. After a while, he reaches a conclusion that "the dummy's a blasted existentialist". He boards his plane, determined to put an end to such daftness. Neil and Chris are driving along a country lane when the pilot attacks. "Two Divided by Zero" is playing. The car is covered with bullet holes, but the Pet Shop Boys drive on, again unharmed. The pilot's monologue piece is known to be extracted from Newton-Smith's book.

They stop by a telephone box, which is being vandalised by a group of youths. Instead of attacking Neil, they politely open the door for him and he phones his mother (Barbara Windsor). The two of them exchange the lines to "What Have I Done to Deserve This?". At the end, Neil puts his head against the broken glass on the door and blood appears.

In a suburban street, a commuter leaves home and there is a scantily clad woman in his upstairs window. He is covered in flames, but does not seem to notice. At the railway station, a zebra is led by two zebra-faced men into a goods van. Neil and Chris sit on the platform watching, then get into another van where a large snake coils itself around them. The van takes them to Paddington station.

At Paddington station, soldiers stand guard and there is a limousine waiting for Neil and Chris. They get in and drive through a tunnel as the chauffeur (Neil Dickson) quotes passages from Milton's Paradise Lost at them. They are driven through a battlefield, with bombs exploding all around them. They pull up by a nightclub and Neil and Chris enter. They perform "One More Chance" to a crowd of dancers. Each dancer has a number on their back. Once the song is finished, Neil and Chris walk up the stairs to leave and on their back are numbers too – except that both of them read "0".

== Cast ==
- Neil Tennant and Chris Lowe as themselves
- Joss Ackland as priest/hitchhiker
- Neil Dickson as car salesman/pilot/chauffeur
- Gareth Hunt as Uncle Dredge/postcard seller/ventriloquist
- Barbara Windsor as Neil's mother/landlady/French maid
- Jonathan and Nicholas Haley as young Lowe and Tennant

== Production ==
=== Development ===
The original idea of making a film emerged from the band's reluctance to go on tour. "We'd planned to do this very theatrical, elaborate tour last year, with the idea of filming it," Tennant said. "We'd hired theatre directors and stage designers, then to our horror we discovered we couldn't afford to take the show on the road. That's when someone suggested making a full-length feature instead". The band hoped that a film would satisfy the fans' demand to see them in live action. "People wanted to see us, and the film seemed like a good idea," said Tennant. "We'd had such fun making our videos," Lowe said, "and the whole business of marrying sounds to images always intrigued us so much that a film seemed like the next logical step. It was something we always wanted to do".

=== Jack Bond ===
Lowe and Tennant were introduced to Jack Bond, who had made films at the BBC about Werner Herzog and Salvador Dalí. The duo made general suggestions to the director, but basically gave him a free hand. "The main thing was to avoid all those terrible 'pop-group-in-a-film' situations where inevitably they get caught up in a web of international intrigue," Tennant said. "Or those kind where there's interminable shots of the band rehearsing for 'The Big Show," said Lowe.

Tennant said Bond, "just put us into our own songs or his idea of what our songs mean, but that doesn't mean this is just another rock video. Some people have criticized this as a long-form video, but 20 years ago, before there were videos, a movie made to music was considered a wonderful thing. I don't see why it shouldn't still be a wonderful thing". "We didn't want to do anything too literal, so it ended up being pretty surreal," said Tennant. "It's more like our version of the Beatles' 'Magical Mystery Tour' than 'A Hard Day's Night', and it doesn't have a linear plot like a thriller. So it's really very impressionistic, and our songs help tell the story as much as the images".

"I don't agree with all his visions," Tennant said of Bond later. "But that's OK. It doesn't worry me. That's the kind of person I am".

=== Filming ===
Filming took place over three weeks in November 1987 in Clacton-on-Sea and south London. Locations in Clacton included the pier, the beach, the promenade, and the amusement arcade. Some interiors were filmed in the West Cliff Theatre, and the greensward was used as a base camp for the cast and crew.

The sequence where a man heads out to work engulfed in flames whilst the song "King's Cross" plays was, at one stage, going to be deleted due to the King's Cross station fire, but it remained at the request of the victims' families.

== Music ==
=== Featured songs ===
The film features the following Pet Shop Boys songs, either in their original form, played as background music or sung by the characters:

- "It Couldn't Happen Here" (from the album Actually)
- "Suburbia" (from the album Please)
- "Opportunities (Let's Make Lots of Money)" (from the album Please)
- "Hit Music" (from the album Actually)
- "It's a Sin" (from the album Actually)
- "What Have I Done to Deserve This?" (from the album Actually)
- "Love Comes Quickly" (from the album Please)
- "Rent" (from the album Actually)
- "West End Girls" (from the album Please)
- "Always on My Mind" (non-album single)
- "Two Divided by Zero" (from the album Please)
- "King's Cross" (from the album Actually)
- "One More Chance" (from the album Actually)
- "I Want to Wake Up" (from the album Actually)

=== Soundtrack track listing ===
Although no formal soundtrack was released, there was a limited promotional cassette.

MC: Parlophone / TC-PSB1 (U.K.)

1. "It Couldn't Happen Here" – 5:21
2. "Suburbia" – 5:07
3. "Opportunities (Let's Make Lots of Money)" – 3:36
4. "It's a Sin" (Extended version) – 7:39
5. "West End Girls" – 3:59
6. "Hit Music" – 4:45
7. "Always on My Mind" (Demo) – 4:04
8. "Rent" (album version) – 5:09
9. "Two Divided by Zero" – 3:32
10. "What Have I Done to Deserve This?" (Extended version) – 6:53
11. "King's Cross" – 5:11
12. "One More Chance" – 5:28
13. "I Want to Wake Up" – 5:09

== Reception ==
The theatrical release received largely negative reviews. In a review for New Statesman and Society, Suzanne Moore wrote: "Imagine the terminal tedium of the average pop video extended to 30 times its natural life and you'll get this picture. With the overkill style of the worst Ken Russell, this film has no idea of what an idea actually is, so instead it's crammed full of images that go absolutely nowhere". She concluded, "It couldn't happen here? Unfortunately it has".

The Los Angeles Times said the Pet Shop Boys "don't deserve the cruel fate they receive here. They are purveyors of pleasant and popular bubble-gum rock who have been caught up in what is essentially a string of MTV-type numbers overlaid with a pseudo-surreal style and snatches of confounding philosophical discourse that might have something to do with Einstein's theory of relativity (for all I know)". Nick Robinson of Music Week called the film "quite a humorous look at England in the Sixties, Seventies and Eighties and the darker moments that most of us go through ... The storyline, what there is of one, is not easy to follow and while the humour is spread thinly throughout there is a pervading air of melancholy with Tennant and Lowe sullen throughout".

In a BFI review of the 2020 Blu-ray release, Sukhdev Sandhu observed: "The biggest surprise for many Pet Shop Boys fans will be the film's use of music. Some songs are only heard, transistor-tinny, in the background. Others have their lyrics recited wanly by Tennant". Jennie Kermode of Eye For Film rated the Blu-ray 2.5 stars, calling it "Not a great film but a fascinating cultural artefact". She elaborated: "Without an understanding of the period and, perhaps most importantly, the language of the pop videos it produced, it's difficult to connect with the film today and it can easily feel like an incoherent mess. Dig a little deeper, though, and there's much to appreciate about it. An affectionate but unforgiving take on a not-so-distant world, it's full of the melancholy that marks out the Pet Shop Boys' songs. It's an outsider's story with a sense of nostalgic longing for what never was".

=== Proposed sequel ===
After making the film, Lowe said, "The director (Jack Bond) is very keen to have us make another one. We're basically character actors, but maybe we could develop the characters a little more". "If we did another film, it would have to be another Pet Shop Boys film," said Lowe. "We're not into playing characters in somebody else's movie, like Sting. We'd rather just be the Pet Shop Boys".

However, the film was a critical and commercial failure. Tennant and Lowe said in 1988:

[Tennant:] It was like a Ken Russell film; there is no more unfashionable filmmaker today. People nowadays expect to have to understand everything. Twenty years ago, people would have thought it was wild because they didn't have the faintest idea what was going on. Now if it had been the story of the Pet Shop Boys meeting in an electrical shop in the King's Road, and making some demos and becoming famous, and ended with us rich and number one in America with 'West End Girls'... [Lowe:] and then the Decline, and then the Comeback, and a great big hit song at the end, it would have worked, don't you think?

== Home video ==
It Couldn't Happen Here was released on VHS on 1 December 1989. A Laserdisc version was available in the US and Japan.

A dual format limited edition DVD and Blu-ray disc was released in the U.K. on 15 June 2020 by the British Film Institute. It has seven special features, including audio commentary by director Jack Bond, James Dillon and Simon Archer, a 27-minute interview with Jack Bond discussing the making of the film titled West End Boy, an interview with choreographer Arlene Phillips, the full-length promotional music video of "Always on My Mind", a 48-page digibook, image gallery and original theatrical trailer. This release is now out of print.

The limited edition was followed by a standard release, replacing the exclusive digibook packaging with a normal Blu-ray case, on 20 July 2020.

== Usage in other media ==
The music video for the single "Always on My Mind" is a compilation of clips from the film.

The Variety Club Remix of the Saint Etienne single "Avenue" samples dialogue from the film. Saint Etienne are known for their admiration of the band, having sampled numerous Pet Shop Boys songs.
