= Black Widow (1951 film) =

British thriller film by Vernon Sewell

- Directed by: Vernon Sewell
- Screenplay by: Allan MacKinnon
- Based on: Return from Darkness by Lester Powell
- Produced by: Anthony Hinds
- Starring: Christine Norden; Robert Ayres
- Cinematography: Walter J. Harvey
- Edited by: James Needs
- Production company: Hammer Film Productions
- Release date: 22 October 1951
- Running time: 62 minutes
- Country: United Kingdom
- Language: English

Black Widow, also referred to as The Black Widow, is a 1951 British second feature thriller film directed by Vernon Sewell and starring Christine Norden and Robert Ayres. It was a Hammer Film production written by Allan MacKinnon based on Lester Powell's 1948 radio serial Return from Darkness. This was the first film Hammer produced at Gilston Park. Filming began on 17 April 1951. Hammer tried to play up former singer Christine Norden as a star, but her career fizzled out at age 28, after two more films.

== Plot ==
Mark Sherwin is driving in the country when he notices a man lying at the side of the road. Assuming the man is the victim of a hit-and-run, he stops to offer assistance, only to be coshed and left stunned while his wallet and car are stolen. On recovering his senses, he staggers towards a nearby farmhouse where he collapses. He is found by the farm owner and his daughter, who summon a doctor. Meanwhile, the car thief comes to grief while speeding round a corner on a clifftop road: the car plunges over the edge and explodes in flames.

Sherwin regains consciousness, but is suffering from complete amnesia with no idea of his own identity or how he came to be found in Yorkshire. The only clue is that he mentioned "Christine" while unconscious. The farm owner and his daughter agree to look after Sherwin while he recuperates. The police investigate missing persons reports but find no case to match Sherwin's age and physical description. Some days later Sherwin is on the mend, and happens to find in his overcoat pocket a ticket stub from a theatre in Epping, a town some distance away. Hoping to find some clue as to his identity, he takes a train to the town to see whether anything will jog his memory. He checks into a hotel, where a painting of a tree-lined avenue seems familiar. The staff direct him to a nearby large house.

At the house, he walks in through the unlocked door. Inside he finds a flower-covered coffin in a room. A woman enters and on seeing Sherwin, screams and faints. This jolts Sherwin's memory and he recognises the woman as his wife Christine. She had believed him dead since the body found in the burned-out car had been identified as his.

Sherwin is bothered by his wife's odd demeanour, particularly her excessive concern about whether or not anybody could have seen him in the street or arriving at the house. His suspicions aroused, he decides to continue to play the amnesiac. Christine attempts to drug him into a deep sleep, but he follows her to the funeral of the car crash victim, where she meets his best friend, Paul, at the burial of the supposed Sherwin. Later, he eavesdrops on her telephone calls and realises that she and Paul have been lovers for some time. The gist of the conversation is the need to dispose of Sherwin quickly before anyone else finds out that he was not the crash victim. Gradually, he finds out that Christine and Paul had been intending to sell the house and cash all his assets, and his inconvenient reappearance has derailed their plans. He decides to play along, until there is an opportune time to confront them. When he eventually reveals that he knows what is afoot, they confess and agree to his offer to pay them off. However, they decide to go ahead with their plot and both make attempts to shoot him, which he foils, and both of them end up dead.

== Cast ==
- Christine Norden as Christine Sherwin
- Robert Ayres as Mark Sherwin
- Jennifer Jayne as Sheila Kemp
- Anthony Forwood as Paul Kenton
- John Longden as Mr. Kemp
- John Harvey as Dr. Wallace
- Reginald Dyson as Police Sergeant
- Joan Carol as hotel desk clerk
- Madoline Thomas as housekeeper
- Jill Hulbert as Helen

== Critical reception ==
The Monthly Film Bulletin wrote: "Coincidence seems to play a great and obvious part in the whole affair. The characters never seem real and act as if they wished it were over."

Picturegoer called the film a "Shoddy story."

Picture Show wrote: "There are many thrills in this somewhat incredible melodrama. ... Christine Norden and Robert Ayres give good performances as the husband and wife."

In British Sound Films: The Studio Years 1928–1959 David Quinlan rated the film as "poor", calling it a "shabby thriller."

TV Guide noted the film as having "some exciting moments."

Leslie Halliwell said: "A whole lot less interesting than it sounds, acting and direction being alike laborious."
