= Black Memory =

1947 British film by Oswald Mitchell

- Trade ad poster
- Directed by: Oswald Mitchell
- Written by: John Gilling
- Produced by: Gilbert Church
- Starring: Michael Atkinson; Myra O'Connell; Michael Medwin; Sid James
- Cinematography: S.D. Onions
- Edited by: John F. House
- Music by: Peter Russell
- Production company: Bushey Studios
- Distributed by: Ambassador Film Productions
- Release date: July 1947
- Running time: 73 mins
- Country: United Kingdom
- Language: English

Black Memory is a 1947 British second feature ('B') crime film directed by Oswald Mitchell and starring Michael Atkinson, Myra O'Connell and Michael Medwin. It was written by John Gilling and featured the first screen appearance of Sid James, known for the Carry On films. Also making her film acting debut was the Welsh-born actress, playwright, screenwriter and film director Jane Arden.

== Premise ==
When his father is wrongly convicted and hanged for murder, son Danny poses as a juvenile delinquent, and ten years later manages to clear his father's name.

== Cast ==
- Michael Atkinson as Danny Cruff
- Myra O'Connell as Joan Davidson
- Michael Medwin as Johnnie Fletcher
- Sid James as Eddie Clinton (credited as Sydney James)
- Frank Hawkins as Alf Davidson
- Jane Arden as Sally Davidson
- Winifred Melville as Mrs. Davidson
- Michael Conry as Carl Broach
- Betty Miller as Mrs. Cruff
- Arthur Brander as Rutford
- Gerald Pring as Hawkins, the headmaster
- Valerie Hulton as Miss Philpotts
- Maurice Nicholas as Johnnie, as a boy
- Malcolm Sommers as Danny, as a boy

== Critical reception ==
The Monthly Film Bulletin wrote: "The subject is grim and the settings and some of the characters are dark and murky. But this only adds to the reality – and realism and credibility are keynotes of this unpretentious but outstanding film. It is outstanding because of the sincerity of the acting – not only by the leads but by the whole cast – and because direction and photography also combine to make a gripping film. Michael Medwin as Johnny is so good that one comes to have a hearty distaste for the 'spiv' he creates. He is ably supported by Michael Atkinson as Danny and a well-chosen cast."

Picturegoer wrote: "Both direction and acting are competent, and the working-class background rings true. Michael Medwin is generally convincing as the now almost inevitable 'spiv,' and Jane Arden is sound as a flighty girl he nearly ruins."

In British Sound Films: The Studio Years 1928–1959 David Quinlan rated the film as "good", writing: "Gripping street-level thriller."

TV Guide wrote: "Weak story, poor dialog; everyone's just kiddin' around."
