= Hugh Moxey =

British actor (1909–1991)

- Born: Hugh Vincent Moxey; 27 September 1909; Bristol, England
- Died: 9 March 1991 (aged 81); Wandsworth, London, England
- Occupation: Actor
- Years active: 1947–1985

Hugh Vincent Moxey (27 September 1909 – 9 March 1991), was a British film and television actor. Moxey spanned his career for 40 years, where he was best remembered in supporting roles in 1950s British war films, including classics such as The Dam Busters and Sink the Bismarck!.

== Filmography ==
see

- Richard of Bordeaux (1947, TV Movie) as Henry, Earl of Derby
- He That Should Come (1948, TV Movie) as Centurion
- Meet Simon Cherry (1949) as Simon Cherry
- The Little Minister (1950, TV Movie) as Cpt. Halliwell
- Sunday Night Theatre (1950-1955, BBC TV Series) as Capt. Pfundmayer / Mr. Goddard / Captain Halliwell
- The Franchise Affair (1951) as Counsel for the Prosecution
- Angels One Five (1952) as the Intelligence officer
- Derby Day (1952) as Police Constable (uncredited)
- The Yellow Balloon (1953) as Police Constable (uncredited)
- Spaceways (1953) as Col. Alfred Daniels
- The Good Die Young (1954) as Doctor at Baths (uncredited)
- Conflict of Wings (1954) as Mr Ruddle
- The Harassed Hero (1954) as Willis
- Burnt Evidence (1954) as Assistant Commissioner
- The Night My Number Came Up (1955) as Wing Commander
- The Dam Busters (1955) as Observer
- The Gold Express (1955) as 'Morning Echo' Editor (uncredited)
- Josephine and Men (1955) as the Police Inspector
- The Adventures of the Big Man (1956, TV Series) as Greenward
- My Teenage Daughter (1956) as Police Officer in Patrol Car (uncredited)
- Scotland Yard (film series) ('The Case of the River Morgue', episode) (1956) as Inspector O'Madden
- Assignment Redhead (1956) as Sgt Tom Coutts
- White Hunter (TV series) (1957) as Purley
- You Pay Your Money (1957) as Tom Cookson
- Brothers in Law (1957) as Golf Club Secretary
- Kenilworth (1957, TV Series) as Lord Burleigh
- Time Without Pity (1957) as the Prison Governor
- Not Wanted on Voyage (1957) as the First Officer
- Saturday Playhouse (1958, TV Series) as Gilbert Baize the gillie
- The Silent Enemy (1958) as Royal Navy Captain (uncredited)
- Television Playwright (1958, TV Series) as Mr Wagland
- ITV Play of the Week (1958, TV Series) as Dr Emmett
- The Verdict Is Yours (1958, TV Series)
- Dial 999 (TV series) (1958-'59) as various characters, in five episodes
- Bobbikins (1959) as Chairman of the Special Committee (uncredited)
- Sink the Bismarck! (1960) as Captain - Second Destroyer (uncredited)
- On Trial (1960, TV Series) as Wyatt Williams
- Danger Man (1960, TV Series) as Sir Arthur Lindsay
- The Snake Woman (1961) as police inspector
- Stryker of the Yard (1963, TV Series)
- Twisted Nerve (1968) as Tom - Durnley's Friend (uncredited)
- Mr. Forbush and the Penguins (1971) as Lord Cheddar
- The Main Chance (1972, TV Series) as Judge Belling
- Hennessy (1975) as Stephen Burgess M.P.
- The Onedin Line (1976, TV Series) as Sam Bell
- Plain Murder (1978, TV Movie) as Reddy's father
- Matilda's England (1979, TV Series) as Major Sewell
- A Question of Guilt (1980, TV Series) as Rev Stevens
- Omen III: The Final Conflict (1981) as the butler
- The Plot to Murder Lloyd George (1982, TV Movie) as Sir Hugo Young
- Strangers and Brothers (1984, TV Series) as Speaker of the House of Commons
- The Pickwick Papers (1985, TV Series) as a gentleman
