= Maria Charles =

English actress (1929–2023)

- Charles, c. 1970
- Born: Maria Zena Schneider; 22 September 1929; London, England
- Died: 21 April 2023 (aged 93)
- Occupation: Actress
- Spouse: Robin Hunter (m. 1952; div. 1966)
- Children: 2; including Kelly Hunter

Maria Zena Schneider (22 September 1929 – 21 April 2023), known professionally as Maria Charles, was an English film, television and stage actress, director and comedienne. She was perhaps best known for her performance as the overbearing mother Bea Fisher in the ITV sitcom Agony. Charles also appeared on the stage in original West End productions, including musicals by Stephen Sondheim, Charles Strouse and Sandy Wilson.

== Early life ==
Maria Zena Schneider was born in London on 22 September 1929. She was the daughter of David Schneider and Celia Schneider (née Ashkenaza). Her father was a hairdresser who used the soubriquet "Mr Charles". When she graduated from the Royal Academy of Dramatic Art in London in 1946 she took her father's working name as her stage surname.

== Career ==
Charles had an exceptionally long acting career that spanned more than seven decades. She made her stage debut as the Dormouse in a 1945 production of Alice in Wonderland at the Connaught Theatre in Worthing and her West End theatre debut in the Pick up Girl at the Prince of Wales Theatre in 1946. Charles appeared in the original London production of The Boy Friend as 'Dulcie' which ran for a total of 2,082 performances (from 1954 to 1959). She played the part of 'Solange Lafitte' in the original West End production of Follies at the Shaftesbury Theatre by Stephen Sondheim. The show ran for 644 performances from 21 July 1987 to 4 February 1989 and starred Julia McKenzie, Daniel Massey and Eartha Kitt. Charles has worked extensively in theatre, TV and films and has carved a niche for herself on television playing clingy Jewish mothers. She appeared in the memorable BBC Play for Today anthology TV series (which ran from 1970 to 1984), in the TV play the Bar Mitzvah Boy which won the BAFTA, British Academy Television Award for best single play; in 1977 it was placed 56th in a BFI poll of the 100 Greatest British Television Programmes of the 20th century, voted by industry professionals. She also played Maureen Lipman's character's mother in the ITV sitcom Agony from 1979 to 1981. In 1981 she starred in Nell Dunn's new comedy play, Steaming at the Comedy Theatre Stratford East, playing alongside Brenda Blethyn; the production won the Laurence Olivier Award for Best New Comedy that year.

Other notable television credits included well known television series such as Z-Cars, Crossroads, Secret Army, Brideshead Revisited, Coronation Street, Whoops Apocalypse, Boon, Never the Twain, Lovejoy, Casualty, Holby City and Bad Girls.

Her notable film credits included: Sisterhood, Hot Fuzz, Cuba, Revenge of the Pink Panther, Victor Victoria, and Sixty Six.

== Personal life and death ==
Charles died on 21 April 2023, aged 93. She had two daughters: Kelly, an actress, and Samantha, a production stage manager.

== Film appearances ==
Year	Title	Role	Notes
1948	A Gunman Has Escaped	Goldie	Monarch
1952	Folly to Be Wise	WRAC female soldier	British Lion
1967	The Deadly Affair	Blonde	Columbia Pictures
1977	The Strange Case of the End of Civilization as We Know It	Tea Lady	Shearwater Films/ London Weekend Television
1978	Revenge of the Pink Panther	Lady Client	United Artists
1979	Cuba	Senora Pulido	United Artists
1982	Victor/Victoria	Madame President	MGM/UA
1988	Under the Bed	Mrs. Weedle	CFU
1990	The Fool	The Pure Gatherer	Sands Films
1991	Antonia and Jane	Sylvia Pinker	Miramax
1995	Savage Hearts	Maria	August Entertainment/ Bratton/ Wavepower Navigation Corp.
1998	Hey, Mr Producer!	The Broadway Babies	Act Two, Broadway Baby
2006	Sixty Six	Mrs. Glitzman	Working Title Films/ StudioCanal/ Ingenious Films
2007	Hot Fuzz	Mrs. Reaper	StudioCanal/ Working Title Films/ Big Talk Productions
2008	Sisterhood	Ethel	Cork Films
2008	In Your Dreams	Mrs. Ivy	Magnet Films

== Television appearances ==
=== Series ===
Year	Title	Role	Network	Notes
1964	Crossroads	Lorelei Macefield	ATV	n/a
1977	Secret Army	Louise Colbert	BBC	6 episodes
1979	Thomas and Sarah	Madge	LWT	3 episodes
1979–1981	Agony	Bea Fisher	LWT	20 episodes
1981–1988	Never the Twain	Mrs. Sadler	Thames Television	28 episodes
1984	Dream Stuffing	May	Channel 4	7 episodes
1995	Agony Again	Bea Fisher	BBC	7 episodes
2002–2003	Bad Girls	Noreen Biggs	ITV	2 episodes
2005	Coronation Street	Lena Thistlewood	ITV	12 episodes

=== Miniseries ===
Year	Title	Role	Production company/ Network	Notes
1957	Nicholas Nickleby	Miss Ninetta Crummles	BBC	1 episode
1972	Anne of Green Gables	Mrs. Blewitt	BBC	1 episode
1973	Pollyanna	Mrs. Higgins	BBC	1 episode
1975	Anne of Avonlea	Mrs. Blewitt	BBC	1 episode
1976	The Prince and the Pauper	Grandma Canty	BBC	3 episodes
1978	Disraeli	Maria D'Israeli	ATV	2 episodes
1981	Brideshead Revisited	Ma Mayfield	Granada	1 episode
1987	A Perfect Spy	Lady Chairperson	BBC	1 episode
1989	Great Expectations	Sarah Pocket	HTV	1 episode
2000	The 10th Kingdom	Old Lady Gambler	NBC	1 episode
2001	Shades	Mrs. Jacobs Senior	Coastal Productions	1 episode

=== Television films ===
Year	Title	Role	Production company/ Network	Notes
1947	The Likes of 'Er	Florrrie Small	BBC	TV movie
1947	The Moon in the Yellow River	Blanaid	BBC	TV movie
1949	A Man's House	Rachel	BBC	TV movie
1957	Pickup Girl	Ruby Lockwood	Associated-Rediffusion	ITV Television Playhouse
1958	The Fourth Wall	Jane Wesr	BBC	Saturday Playhouse
1968	Rogues' Gallery: The Curious Adventures of Miss Jane Rawley	Dorinda	Associated-Rediffusion	ITV Playhouse
1969	Rogues' Gallery: The Timorous Rake	Mrs. Tindal	LWT	ITV Sunday Night Theatre
1972	The Mill	Mrs. Hartop	Granada	Country Matters
1974	Great Expectations	Sara Pocket	NBC	TV movie
1975	The Good Samaritan	Liz Roper	Thames Television	Six Days of Justice
1975	Her Wedding Morn	Mrs. Skedmore	BBC	Ten from Twenties
1976	Bar Mitzvah Boy	Mrs. Rita Green	BBC	Play for Today
1976	Fast Hands	Hidla	Thames Television	Plays for Britain
1977	Cheers	Phyllis	Yorkshire Television	The Galton and Simpson Playhouse
1977	Street Party	Jessie White	BBC	Jubilee
1984	Singles Weekend	Rose	LWT	Weekend Playhouse
1987	Elphida	Mrs. Barlow	Working Title Films/ Channel 4	TV movie
1997	Oliver Twist	Widow Corney	ABC	TV movie
1998	Crime and Punishment	Alena	Hallmark/ NBC	TV movie
2000	Cor, Blimey!	Mrs. Hawtrey	Company Pictures/ ITV	TV movie

=== Television episodes ===
Year	Title	Role	Production company/ Network	Notes
1969	Rogues Gallery	Dorcas Tindal	Granada	Episode: "The Timorous Rake"
1974	Z-Cars	Myrtle	BBC	Episode: "Mysteries"
1975	Crown Court	Joyce Farrington	Granada	Episode: "Will the Real Robert Randell Please Stand Up" (parts 1–3)
1975	Within These Walls	Nellie Evans	LWT	Episode: "For Life"
1975	Doctor on the Go	Mrs. Button	LWT	Episode: "A Heart in the Right Place"
1976	Angels	Pauline	BBC	Episode: "Facade"
1977	Yanks Go Home	Mrs. Franlink	Granada	Episode: "Bed of Roses"
1982	Whoops Apocalypse	Jewish woman	LWT	Episode: "The Violet Hour"
1982	Shine on Harvey Moon	Mrs. McIntyre	Central	Episode: "Safe as Houses"
1985	Super Gran	Gladys Grocklebank	Tyne Tees	Episode: "Super Gran and the Day at the Sea"
1987	The Two Ronnies	Old Woman	BBC	1 episode
1988	Boon	Mrs. Jowett	Central	Episode: "Charity Begins at Home" (parts 1 & 2)
1989	Casualty	Miss Phelan	BBC	Episode: "Deluge"
1990	Alas Smith & Jones	Various	BBC	1 episode
1991	Woof!	Mrs. Priskett	Central	1 episode
1993	Lovejoy	Alice	BBC	Episode: "The Galloping Major"
1993	The Young Indiana Jones Chronicles	Second lady	The Family Channel/ NBC	Episode: "Paris, October 1916"
2000	London's Burning	Cora	LWT	1 episode
2001	Holby City	Celia Owen	BBC	Episode: "Release"
2001	Down to Earth	Vera Foster	BBC	Episode: "Home Truths"
2002	Doctors	Edna	BBC	Episode: "Ticking"
2004	The Basil Brush Show	Mrs. String	BBC	Episode: "Soap a Dope"
2007	Ruddy Hell! Its Harry and Paul	Jasper's Mother	BBC	2 episodes
2009	Skins	Granny	Company Pictures/ Storm Dog Films/ Channel 4	Episode: "Finale"

== Stage appearances ==
- (Stage debut) Dormouse, Alice in Wonderland, Connaught Theatre, Worthing, England, 1945
- (London West End debut) Ruby Lockwood, The Pick-Up Girl, Prince of Wales Theatre, London, 1946
- Rosie, Women of Twilight, Vaudeville Theatre, London, 1951
- See You Again (Sandy Wilson revue), Watergate Theatre, London, 1952
- Swing Back the Gate (Geoffrey Wright, revue), Irving Theatre, London, 1952.
- Sorrell Connaught, A Kiss for Adele, Royal Court Theatre, London, 1952
- Florrie Solomon, Spring Song, Embassy Theatre, London, 1953
- Dulcie, The Boy Friend, Wyndham's Theatre, London, 1954–1958
- Dulcie Du Bois, The Boy Friend, Globe Theatre, London, 1965
- Fairy Sorayah, Ali Baba and the Forty Thieves, Players' Theatre, London, 1965
- Florence, Enter a Free Man, St. Martin's Theatre, London, 1968
- Jessie Macfarlane, Mrs. Dawkins, Bridgid O'Cooney, Mrs. van Boven, Dellarosa Paravici, Miss Minter, Mary Thornton, Mrs. Campbell-Scully, and Mrs. Zuckmeyer, They Don't Grow on Trees, Prince of Wales Theatre, 1969
- Felice Kovacs, Partners, Royal Lyceum Theatre, Edinburgh, Scotland, 1969
- Piglet, Winnie the Pooh, Phoenix Theatre, London, 1972
- Fairy Cabbage Rose, Beauty and the Beast, Players' Theatre, 1973
- Annie Chapman, Jack the Ripper, Players' Theatre, 1974
- Mrs. Dolly Gallagher Levi, The Matchmaker, Her Majesty's Theatre, London, 1978
- Mistress Overdone, Measure for Measure, Riverside Studios, Hammersmith, England, 1979
- Miss Hannigan, Annie, Victoria Palace Theatre, London, 1979
- Steaming, Theatre Royal Stratford East, London, 1981
- Yente, Fiddler on the Roof, Apollo Theatre, London, 1983
- Solange Lafitte, Follies, Shaftesbury Theatre, London 1987
- Multiple roles in the British National Theatre repertoire season at the Cottesloe Theatre, Lyttelton Theatre, and Olivier Theatre in London, 1989
- Vera Klein, The Absence of War, Royal National Theatre, London, 1993
- Melissa, Party Time & One for the Road, Battersea Arts Centre, London, 2003.
- Noreen Biggs, Bad Girls, Garrick Theatre, London, 2007

== Directing credits ==
- The Boy Friend, (40th anniversary original cast reunion), at the Players Theatre, London, 1995.
- Poppy at the ICA, London, 1999.

== Other ==
- Anna Gemignani, Anna (pilot), NBC, 1990
- Charles also appeared in Angel Pavement, Down Our Street, Easter Passion, The Fourth Wall, The Good Old Days, La Ronde, Turn Out the Lights, The Ugliest Girl in Town, The Voice of the Turtle, and Sheppey.
