= The Man in Black (film) =

- handbill poster
- Directed by: Francis Searle
- Written by: John Gilling from a story by Francis Searle from the radio series by John Dickson Carr
- Produced by: Anthony Hinds
- Starring: Betty Ann Davies; Sheila Burrell; Sid James; Anthony Forwood; Valentine Dyall
- Cinematography: Cedric Williams
- Edited by: John Ferris; Ray Pitt
- Music by: Frank Spencer
- Production company: Hammer Film Productions
- Distributed by: Exclusive Films
- Release date: January 1950
- Running time: 75 minutes
- Country: United Kingdom
- Language: English

The Man in Black is a 1950 British second feature ('B') thriller film produced by Hammer Films, directed by Francis Searle and starring Betty Ann Davies, Sid James, Sheila Burrell, and Anthony Forwood, with Valentine Dyall in the title role. It was written by John Gilling from a story by Searle, which in turn was based on the popular British radio series Appointment with Fear by John Dickson Carr which featured Valentine Dyall as "The Man in Black". Dyall provides the on-screen introduction to the film. Jimmy Sangster was the assistant director. This was the first film Hammer ever produced at Oakley Court. Production began on 8 Aug. 1949, and the film was released in January 1950 (in UK only). As this film was in production, James Carreras traveled to the United States to sign a distribution deal with Robert L. Lippert which resulted in Hammer's films being better distributed in the US in the early 1950s.

== Plot ==
The ill and fragile millionaire, Henry Clavering, a yoga enthusiast and collector of Oriental objects, organises an evening to display his ability to go into a Yogic trance. He tells his audience that any noise could bring about his death. A picture falls from the wall and he slumps over in his chair and is pronounced dead. His daughter Joan Clavering returns to the home of her widowed stepmother Bertha. While Henry's will bequeaths £5000 to Bertha, he has left the vast bulk of his fortune, of around a quarter of a million pounds including his house and estate, to Joan, with the proviso that if she becomes mentally incapacitated in some way, her affairs shall be conducted by Bertha and her daughter Janice (from an earlier marriage). Bertha conspires with Janice and Janice's fiancé Victor to drive Joan insane. Hodson, who was Henry's faithful butler/gardner, tries to expose their scheme, but after he is accidentally killed by Victor, Victor hides his body in the family vault in an empty coffin he finds there. Joan tells Bertha and Janice that she is psychic and has received some messages from Henry from beyond the grave, and she sets up a séance to prove it. During the séance, Henry appears in person, having successfully used his yogic abilities during his display to simulate his death, and he reveals that he deliberately set up the situation because he suspected what Bertha and Janice would do. The police arrive and Joan is reunited with her father.

== Cast ==
- Betty Ann Davies as Bertha Clavering
- Sheila Burrell as Janice
- Sidney James as Henry Clavering / Hodson
- Anthony Forwood as Victor Harrington
- Valentine Dyall as Your Storyteller, the Man in Black
- Gerald Case as doctor
- Hazel Penwarden as Joan Clavering
- Laurence Baskcomb as Sandford
- Courtney Hope as Carter
- Mollie Palmer as Elsie

== Critical reception ==
The Monthly Film Bulletin wrote: "Preposterous melodrama from the radio series. Betty Ann Davies and Sheila Burrell, as the most transparent villainesses since Lady Audley, are good for a number of laughs, but this was not, presumably, the intention."

TV Guide wrote, "The story is drivel, with some unintentionally campy plot developments. It was adapted from a British radio series, perhaps proving that some dramas are better heard than seen."

Fantastic Movie Musings and Ramblings wrote, "One of Hammer's earlier forays into horror. This one is highly recommended."

Leonard Maltin called it a "clever little thriller with some surprises and a rare noncomic role for James."

In British Sound Films: The Studio Years 1928–1959 David Quinlan rated the film as "mediocre", writing: "Ridiculous chiller at least moves along a fair rate."
