= Bouquet of Barbed Wire =

1976 British television drama series

- Genre: Drama
- Written by: Andrea Newman
- Starring: Frank Finlay; Susan Penhaligon; Sheila Allen; James Aubrey; Deborah Grant
- Theme music composer: Dennis Farnon
- Country of origin: United Kingdom
- Original language: English

Production
- Executive producer: Rex Firkin
- Producer: Tony Wharmby
- Production company: London Weekend Television

Original release
- Network: ITV
- Release: 9 January – 20 February 1976

Bouquet of Barbed Wire
- Genre: Drama
- Written by: Guy Andrews
- Starring: Trevor Eve; Hermione Norris
- Country of origin: United Kingdom
- Original language: English
- No. of seasons: 1
- No. of episodes: 3

Production
- Production company: Mammoth Screen

Original release
- Network: ITV
- Release: 6 September – 20 September 2010

Bouquet of Barbed Wire is a British television drama series based on the novel by Andrea Newman published in 1969. It was produced by London Weekend Television for ITV and first broadcast in 1976. The series is known for its treatment of family and sexual dynamics, focused on the relationship between father and daughter. A remake was broadcast in 2010.

== Cast ==
Character	1976 adaptation	2010 adaptation
Peter Manson	Frank Finlay	Trevor Eve
Prue Sorenson	Susan Penhaligon	Imogen Poots
Gavin Sorenson	James Aubrey	Tom Riley
Cassie Manson	Sheila Allen	Hermione Norris
Sarah Francis	Deborah Grant	Jemima Rooper

== Outline of 1976 adaptation ==
=== Homecoming ===
Prue Sorensen (Susan Penhaligon) is a university student who, after becoming pregnant, marries American student Gavin (James Aubrey). Her father, Peter Manson (Frank Finlay), is a publisher who appears to have an unhealthy relationship with his daughter and becomes distressed over her pregnancy and marriage. The pregnancy creates tension between Peter and Gavin, which Prue exploits for her own amusement. It is implied that Prue has engineered the marriage and pregnancy to provoke her father.

Prue and Gavin stay at her parents' house for the weekend, ostensibly to smooth over relations with Peter. However, this endeavour fails and Peter barely acknowledges Gavin's presence. Prue's mother, Cassie (Sheila Allen), is more accepting of Gavin, despite being aware that Prue is playing her father and her husband against each other. Prue suggests to Gavin that they invite Peter to accompany them on a summer holiday in France, yet when Gavin approaches Peter about it, he declines.

=== Introductions ===
A young woman named Sarah Francis (Deborah Grant) is hired as Peter's new office secretary. Soon it becomes apparent that Peter is attracted to Sarah, but he does not pursue her. During an argument with Cassie, Peter says he is struck by Sarah's ambitious drive, and contrasts it to what he perceives as Prue's recklessness. Sarah is an independent woman who is seeing two men, one of whom visits her flat against her landlord's rules. Drama ensues when Sarah's alcoholic father arrives at the apartment unannounced.

Cassie, fearful that the family is growing apart, suggests that she and Peter go on holiday to Scotland with their two young sons, showing them the places they visited on their honeymoon. Peter remains increasingly obsessed with Prue, and mistakenly believes her pregnancy has ruined her life. He grows resentful towards Cassie, who he believes has sided against him with Prue. Meanwhile, Prue refuses to speak with Peter because of his treatment of Gavin. Later, Gavin hits Prue due to her refusal to go to work. He later apologises profusely for hitting her, claiming that he will never do it again.

=== Repercussions ===
Immediately after Prue is agitated by Gavin, Peter admits to Cassie that everything she said is true. Cassie realises that both the affair and the accusation are evidence of Peter's twisted obsession with Prue and orders him to leave; he spends the night at Sarah's apartment. Later, Cassie is called to the hospital where Gavin has admitted a badly beaten Prue. When Gavin visits Cassie the next day, he claims that she had been putting him to beating her as a means of self-punishment. He pleads with Prue to stop making him hurt her; she ignores him and casually says that she "had it coming".

== Another Bouquet (1977) ==
Following the success of the series, a sequel was commissioned, covering the same characters' later history.

== 2010 adaptation ==
The novel was adapted for ITV by Mammoth Screen, as a three-part series broadcast by ITV on 6–20 September 2010. Adapted by Guy Andrews and directed by Ashley Pearce, it starred Trevor Eve as Peter Manson, Hermione Norris as Cassie Manson, Tom Riley as Gavin Sorenson and Imogen Poots as Prue Sorenson.

The 2010 adaptation made some changes to the novel and the 1976 adaptation. In this adaptation, Prue is a sixth form student and Gavin is her Yorkshire-born English teacher, rather than an American PhD student. The first episode garnered 5.98 million viewers and received positive reviews. It was released on DVD on 20 September 2010.
