= The Three Strangers =

1883 short story by Thomas Hardy

- Short story by Thomas Hardy
- Country: United Kingdom
- Language: English
- Genre: Short story

Publication
- Published in: Longman's Magazine; Harper's Weekly
- Publication type: Periodical; Book
- Media type: Print
- Publication date: 1883

Chronology
- Series: Wessex Tales
—	The Withered Arm

"The Three Strangers" is a short story by Thomas Hardy, first published in Longman's Magazine and Harper's Weekly in March 1883. It became the first of five stories in Hardy's 1888 short story collection Wessex Tales.

== Plot ==
One stormy March night in the 1820s, a shepherd and his wife are holding a party to celebrate the christening of their daughter. Inside the lonely cottage, nineteen people are gathered in a small room, warming themselves in front of a crackling fire, while outside the storm rages. An unexpected knock is heard at the door, and a stranger asks leave to come in for shelter. He is heartily welcomed, given a seat in the chimney corner, some tobacco, and a jug of mead. The stranger makes himself entirely at home, and soon it seems likely he will drink the place dry.

A second knock is heard, and another stranger seeks refuge from the weather. He explains he is on his way to the nearby town of Casterbridge, where he has a job to do at 8 o'clock the next morning. This stranger is initially reticent about his occupation, but it soon becomes clear from his songs that he is the local hangman.

A third stranger knocks and asks the way. On seeing and hearing the company from the threshold, the man reacts as if terrified, closes the door and flees. The company falls silent, not knowing what to make of this odd behaviour. Then, the repeated sound of an alarm-gun is heard in the distance: a signal that a prisoner has escaped from Casterbridge jail. The hangman, as representative of the law, calls on the company to form a search party to chase and apprehend the fleeing prisoner.

After a long pursuit late into the night, the third stranger is captured and returned to the cottage, where a magistrate and turnkey await him. But the turnkey unexpectedly announces that this is not the prisoner he is seeking. The man explains that he is in fact the escaped prisoner's brother, and was on his way to visit him in his condemned cell when he stopped at the cottage to ask his way. When he opened the cottage door he saw his own brother sitting in the chimney corner, with his hangman unknowingly jammed in next to him, the two men joined in song.

The next morning the search resumes, this time for the stranger in the chimney corner. But the country-folk now know that the man they seek has been condemned to death merely for sheep-stealing, and he has their sympathy. The search is not as thorough as it might have been, and the sheep-stealer is never seen again. Decades later, the tale of the three strangers remains as well known as ever in the local area.

== Background ==
The story is a pastoral history told by an omniscient narrator more than 50 years after the event. The sheep-stealer is a kind of folk hero who stole to survive and escaped by outsmarting the hangman.

Casterbridge was the name for Dorchester in Thomas Hardy's Wessex.

== Adaptations ==
The story was adapted as an opera by Elizabeth Maconchy, completed in 1958 and later revised.
