= Barbara of the House of Grebe =

- Short story by Thomas Hardy
- Country: United Kingdom
- Language: English
- Genre(s): Short story

Publication
- Published in: The Graphic
- Publication type: Periodical; Book
- Media type: Print
- Publication date: 1890 (periodical); 1891 (book)

Chronology
- Series: A Group of Noble Dames
The First Countess of Wessex	The Marchioness of Stonehenge

"Barbara of the House of Grebe" is the second of ten short stories in Thomas Hardy's frame narrative A Group of Noble Dames. It is told by the old surgeon. The story was published in The Graphic in 1890 and in book form in 1891.

== Plot summary ==
Lord Uplandtowers, a young man who lives in a mansion in Knollingwood Hall, has decided he wants to marry Barbara, the daughter of his neighbour Sir John Grebe. However she elopes with the beautiful Edmond Willowes, a widow's son from a family of glass painters, and marries him without her parents' consent. A few months later Sir John reconciles with his daughter and her husband. He agrees to support them financially and let them live in Yewsholt Lodge on one condition: Edmond has to go to study in Italy for one year.

During his stay in Italy Edmond has an accident. His face is badly wounded in a fire. When he returns to England he's wearing a mask. In Yewsholt Lodge he takes his mask off before his wife. Barbara is shocked and can't bear to face him. She spends the night alone in the hot-house. The next morning she finds a farewell letter from Edmond.

Several years later, when Edmond is dead, Lord Uplandtowers convinces Barbara to marry him now. However she doesn't love him, because she's still thinking of her first husband. Every night, while she believes Lord Uplandtowers is asleep, she goes to a closet in her boudoir where she keeps a statue that a sculptor in Pisa had made of Edmond. One night Lord Uplandtowers follows her unnoticed and sees her with her arms around the statue. The next day he hires a sculptor to disfigure the statue's head in the same way Edmond's head was disfigured in the fire. He places the statue in their bedroom until Barbara gets an epileptic seizure and begs him to remove the statue. She finally becomes a loving wife to Lord Uplandtowers, but one whom he perceives as empty and soulless.

== Time and location ==
The story takes place around 1780 in Thomas Hardy's Wessex, more specifically in "South Wessex" (Dorset). "Chene Manor" (in reality Canford Manor) is a house in Canford Magna. "Yewsholt Lodge" was really called Farrs House. Edmond was from "Shottsford Forum", in reality Blandford Forum.

== Critical reception ==
A reviewer from The Spectator called the story "as unnatural as it is disgusting".

T. S. Eliot said the story "would seem to have been written solely to provide a satisfaction for some morbid emotion".

== Adaptation ==
The sixth episode of the 1973 BBC series Wessex Tales was an adaptation of "Barbara of the House of Grebe".

=== Cast ===
- Joanna McCallum .... Barbara
- Nick Brimble .... Willowes
- Ben Kingsley .... Lord Uplandtowers
- Leslie Sands .... Sir John Grebe
- Sheila Allen .... Lady Grebe
