= A Group of Noble Dames =

First US edition (publ. Harper and Brothers)

A Group of Noble Dames is an 1891 collection of short stories written by English author Thomas Hardy. The stories are contained by a frame narrative in which ten members of a club each tell one story about a noble dame in the 17th or 18th century. Hardy included this work with his "Romances and fantasies".

== Contents ==
Part I—Before Dinner

- The First Countess of Wessex by the local historian
- Barbara of the House of Grebe by the old surgeon
- The Marchioness of Stonehenge by the rural dean
- Lady Mottisfont by the sentimental member

Part II—After Dinner

- The Lady Icenway by the churchwarden
- Squire Petrick’s Lady by the crimson maltster
- Anna, Lady Baxby by the colonel
- The Lady Penelope by the man of family
- The Duchess Of Hamptonshire by the quiet gentleman
- The Honourable Laura by the spark

== Publication ==
All ten stories were published in serial magazines before Hardy collected them into book form. "The Duchess of Hamptonshire" and "The Honourable Laura" were written relatively early in Hardy's career, in 1878 and 1881 respectively. "The First Countess of Wessex" and "The Lady Penelope" were written in 1888-89. Hardy revised all four of these stories significantly before adding them to the collection in 1891. The remaining six stories were written in early 1890 and published in bowdlerised form in a special Christmas number of The Graphic in December 1890.

Hardy collected all ten stories together for the first time in A Group of Noble Dames, which was published in England by Osgood, McIlvaine, & Co. and in America by Harper & Brothers in 1891. The critical reception of the book was mixed.

== TV and film adaptations ==
"Barbara of the House of Grebe" was adapted as a television drama by the BBC as part of an anthology series called Wessex Tales. Broadcast 12 December 1973 on BBC2.
