= Anti-Clock =

1979 film

- DVD cover
- Directed by: Jane Arden; Jack Bond
- Written by: Jane Arden
- Produced by: Jack Bond
- Starring: Sebastian Saville
- Cinematography: Jane Arden; Jack Bond; Mike Biddle; Rupert Parker; Gordon McKerrow; Dominic Holiday
- Edited by: Jack Bond
- Music by: Mihai Dragutescu
- Production companies: Kendon Films; Jack Bond Films; Boyd/Co
- Release date: November 1979
- Running time: 96 minutes
- Country: United Kingdom
- Language: English

Anti-Clock (also known as Anti-clock: a Time Stop in the Life of Joseph Sapha) is a 1979 British experimental psychological science-fiction drama film directed by Jane Arden and Jack Bond. It was written by Arden and produced by Bond. The film, which stars Arden's son Sebastian Saville, was shot on film and video in colour with black and white sequences.

== Plot ==
The film mixes pioneering video techniques with pin-sharp colour footage in order to create a densely woven, dream-like narrative which explores issues of personal identity and social conformity. The story takes Joseph Sapha though the shadows of his past to confront that mirror image of the self.

== Cast ==
- Sebastian Saville as Professor J.D. Zanov/Joseph Sapha
- Suzan Cameron as Alanda Clark
- Tom Gerrard as The Dealer
- Liz Saville as Sapha's sister
- Madame Luisa Aranowicz as parapsychologist
- Marguerita Gagarin as parapsychologist
- Yoshiro Matsuya as parapsychologist
- Katherine Newell as parapsychologist
- Gia-Fu Feng as Tai chi master
- Don Wilde as Alpha therapist
- Richard Feynman as The Physicist
- Brian Jones
- Jasper Gough
- Robert Armstrong
- Joe Chappell
- Molly Tweedlie
- Derek Osborne
- Tony C.T. Tang
- Chan Fai
- William K. Lam
- Pat Bond
- Kenneth Pearson
- Louise Temple (uncredited)

== Production ==
Don Boyd helped make the film.

=== Filming locations ===
The film was shot on location in London and Norfolk, England (per film credits).

=== Music ===
Arden sings the songs "Sleepwalking" and "Figures in White", for which she also wrote the lyrics.

== Release ==
The film opened the 1979 London Film Festival but was never picked up for British distribution: its only other public British screening was at the National Film Theatre in 1983 as a tribute to Jane Arden, who committed suicide at the end of the previous year. The film remained unseen since then. However, it had a modest theatrical release in the US, where it received considerable critical acclaim.

After Arden's suicide in 1982, Bond withdrew the film from circulation.

== Reception ==
Variety wrote: "As with many faddists and hoaxers, the filmmakers take scientific principles and draw absurd conclusions from them out of context. In Anti-Clock, the theories of physics formulated by Heisenberg and Einstein to explain the properties of subatomic particles are fatuously applied to issues of human behavior. This gives Arden and Bond license to rail out against sexism and materialism, but their 'we are all one' philosophy is strained. Despite contributions by some talented cameramen, film is a technical shambles."

Sight and Sound Claire Monk wrote that the film: "merits a place in moving-image history as a conceptually ingenious experiment in making a 'video movie' at a time when this was a genuinely new and cumbersome technology."

For The Quietus, Anthony Nield wrote: "The tone is reminiscent of early Cronenberg (particularly the black and white miniatures of Stereo and Crimes Of The Future) and JG Ballard: bleak, clinical, of its time and out of time. The seventies are there in the background, but they barely impinge on proceedings."

== Home media ==
The film was restored by the British Film Institute for DVD and Blu-ray and released on 13 July 2009.
