= Separation (1967 film) =

British film by Jack Bond

- Directed by: Jack Bond
- Written by: Jane Arden
- Produced by: Jack Bond
- Starring: Jane Arden
- Cinematography: Aubrey Dewar; David Muir
- Edited by: Michael Johns
- Music by: Stanley Myers; Matthew Fisher
- Production company: Bond Films
- Release date: 25 March 1968
- Running time: 93 minutes
- Country: United Kingdom
- Language: English

Separation is a 1967 British experimental psychological drama film directed by Jack Bond and starring Jane Arden, David de Keyser, Ann Lynn and Iain Quarrier. It was written by Arden. The mostly black and white film occasionally cuts to colour sequences.

== Plot ==
The film concerns the inner life of a woman during a period of breakdown – marital and possibly mental. Her past and (possible?) future are revealed through a fragmented and often humorous narrative, in which dreams and desires are as real as Swinging London, the film's setting.

== Cast ==
- Jane Arden as Jane
- David de Keyser as husband/psychiatrist
- Ann Lynn as woman
- Iain Quarrier as Iain, Jane's lover
- Fay Brooke
- Terence De Marney as old man
- Malou Pantera
- Ann Norman
- Joy Bang
- Kathleen Saintsbury
- Peter Thomas
- Neil Holmes
- Theo Aygar
- Leslie Linder
- Tom Corbett
- Donald Sayer

== Production ==
=== Filming ===
The film was shot around London and at Caravel Studios. It was completed at Twickenham Film Studios.

=== Music ===
The film features on its soundtrack music by Stanley Myers, one song ("Salad Days") by the British rock group Procol Harum and instrumental music by Procol's original organist Matthew Fisher.

== Release ==
=== Obscurity ===
After its release, Separation was thought lost and was barely known for decades until its re-release.

=== Home media ===
The film was restored by the British Film Institute for DVD and Blu-ray Disc and re-released in the UK on 13 July 2009. Another edition of the DVD, with a different cover photo and music credits for Procol Harum on the front cover and for Stanley Myers, Procol Harum and Matthew Fisher on the back cover, was released in the US in March, 2010. Separation was released on DVD in the U.S. for the first time on 30 March 2010 by Microcinema.

== Critical reception ==
The Monthly Film Bulletin wrote: "The less said the kinder about this desperate attempt at avant garde cinema. On the evidence of the masochistic fantasies with which the singularly irritating central character is confronted, television director Jack Bond evidently aspires to be Britains answer to Fellini – and more. But his concoction of interior imagery, bleached out dream sequences and crude symbolism (a clock face smashed at regular intervals, a pistol in a shooting gallery) is as shapeless and incoherent as Jane Arden's suffocatingly self-conscious dialogue ("those crystal eye-balls, those stunning, indifferent fingers", and so on). Several films have indicated that the stream of consciousness technique is not an exclusively literary property, but there is all the difference in the world between the calculated mystification of a Robbe-Grillet and a series of ostentatious images stuck together without shape or form. An occasional scene is strikingly shot, particularly the fantasy in the swimming bath (though this is straight out of Alphaville); but too often the film's attempts at innovation produce only a chaotic array of fancy angles, monochrome tints and tired pastiche. At the end of it all one knows little more about the woman (which is presumably the film's raison d'étre) than that she is subject to attacks of fantasy. And if the fistful of clichés she and her husband deliver in the apparently improvised and interminable sequence in the restaurant are anything to judge by, it's hardly surprising that she has problems in communicating. Jane Arden's embarrassingly narcissistic performance is fully in keeping with her script: as someone in the film says, "Being a romantic is very painful for other people"."

Kine Weekly wrote: "Psychological puzzle. ... This film is just about as satisfying as a nightmare and quite as logical. ...To the ordinary, uninformed cinemagoer in search of entertainment the only aspect of this film that is likely to be understood is that it is an attempt to express the emotional ramblings of a lonely woman. But the producer-director and the star, who is also the author, have failed in the vital matter of communication. The 'story' lacks continuity, lucidity, explanation and incident. It jumps from one facet of the main character to another without reference to time or commonsense; interpolates lifelike but boring conversations about nothing in particular; and even includes one extraneous scene that is pointlessly vulgar. At the end of all this, little of note would seem to have been achieved by anyone concerned."

Variety wrote: "There is certainly a place, even perhaps a need, for avant garde films and filmmakers, but Jack Bond and his colleagues have just run riot. Maybe they know what it's all about, but for the audience ... it's a puzzlement. It is not just that the story line is obscure; that's fairly commonplace nowadays. But Separation is without shape or form, has no inherent or logical continuity, is self-indulgent and obviously derivative. One of its more irritating features is the habit of repeating the dialog at irregular intervals throughout the film; that would have been bad enough in any circumstances, but when the script is dull and witless in the first place, repetition only adds to the boredom. Jane Arden has credit for the original subject ... Her story is presumably a study in mental breakdown, and that allows the opportunity to display a certain amount of conventional histrionics. David Kayser as her husband is barely adequate. A couple of gratuitous nudie sequences will hardly help at the boxoffice. Jack Bond's direction adds to the confusion, and the editing (with the action jumping forwards and backwards in time) increases the obscurity."

Vincent Canby wrote in The New York Times: "According to a program note for Separation, ...the film 'is desperately serious and deeply involved. . . . This woman, every woman, lays herself open to the audience who must make what they will of the fragments of her life that make up her death.' This program note, provided to reviewers along with the standard cast-and-credit sheet, sounds its own note of serious desperation. It's almost as if Jack Bond, the director, and Jane Arden, who wrote the story and stars in the film, were afraid that without these instructions the uninformed moviegoer would mistake their surreal fantasy about every woman for something that looks suspiciously like a soap opera about – of all things – menopause. Although Separation has been stunningly photographed and rather stylishly splintered in time between past and present, between fantasy and reality, it is, essentially, the humdrum study of a woman approaching middle age, newly separated from her husband, uncertain and lonely despite the attentions of a handsome young lover, and wondering, oh-God-what-does-it-all-mean?

Phelim O'Neill wrote in The Guardian: "Separation appears to be a subconscious trawl thorough a marital and possibly mental breakdown – a dourly groovy one, set in swinging London."
