= Jack Bond (director) =

British film producer and director (1937–2024)

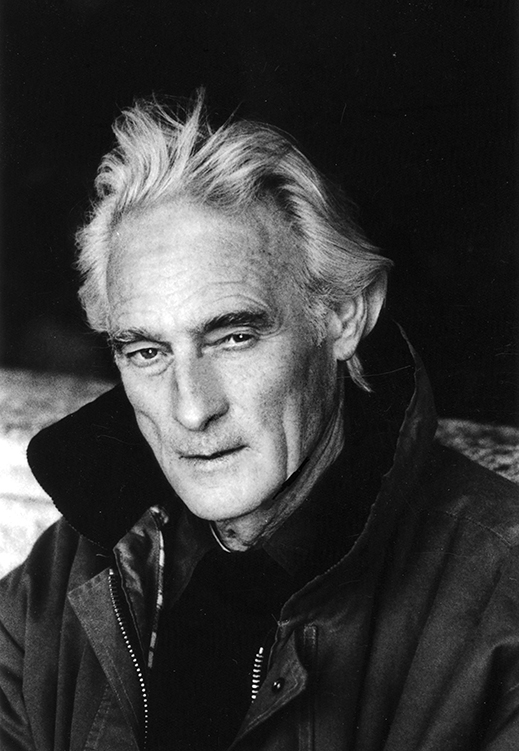
- Born: 10 December 1937; London, England
- Died: 21 December 2024 (aged 87); Twickenham, London, England
- Occupations: Film director, film producer, television director
- Spouse: Moira (m. 1984, separated)
- Partner: Mary-Rose Storey (from 1999)
- Children: 4 (Note: 1 deceased)

Jack Bond (10 December 1937 – 21 December 2024) was a British film producer and director. He was best known for his work on The South Bank Show and his partnership with the British writer, actor and director Jane Arden (1927–1982) between 1965 and 1979.

== Life and career ==
Bond was born in London, on 10 December 1937.

In 1965, Bond made a documentary film with Salvador Dalí, Dali in New York. Dalí had been based in New York city, particularly the St Regis Hotel, with his wife Gala since the 1930s. The film revolves around an ongoing interview of Dali by Arden about his creative process. This all takes place against the backdrop of social life and work including putting together two exhibitions of his work and a book, as well as various performance art displays including a final scene where Dali paints alongside a flamenco duo (singer José Reyes and guitarist Manitas de Plata). Commenting on the subject of his film, Bond observed "Dalí always knew exactly what he wanted and he got it. The doormen had to pay Dalí’s taxi fare. He was ‘grand’ in the real meaning of the word. He fitted New York like a glove, it was made for him, and The St. Regis was, and still is, the best hotel in the whole city. He was even able to paint there – he kept a special room as his studio."

Working with Arden, Bond directed the award winning Separation (1967), produced The Other Side of the Underneath (1972) and co-directed Anti-Clock (1979). These three films were reissued by the British Film Institute on Blu-ray and DVD on 13 July 2009. Interviewed in 2013, Bond recalled how, as a result of the refusal of the British film industry to screen Anti-Clock, he instead took the film to the United States. At a New York screening, one influential critic, although refusing to talk to Bond both before and after the screening, nonetheless gave the film a five star review. As a direct result of this review, the film was a hit in the USA and Bond received approaches for distribution for the film from UK distributors who had previously turned the film down, offers which were rejected by Bond.

In 1988, Bond directed the feature-length film It Couldn't Happen Here featuring Pet Shop Boys, as well as the music video for their single "Heart". Even before the film received a title, it was devised as a compilation of interrelated music videos that together would form one ongoing plot, in a manner comparable to The Line, the Cross and the Curve. However, once Bond was appointed as producer and co-writer as well as director, the project expanded into a full fledged feature film. After Arden's death, Bond primarily worked as a director of TV documentaries, primarily on The South Bank Show during which time he covered such topics as Roald Dahl and Catherine Cookson. In this context, It Couldn't Happen Here marked a return to drama film making for Bond.

In 2010, Bond was interviewed by VBS.TV and Jamie Reynolds of the Klaxons for VBS Meets...Jack Bond. A fierce devotee of Bond and his work, during the interview Reynolds described in detail the influence of Bond on the Klaxons' music. Other topics covered in the discussion included surrealism, astrology and an incident in which, during the course of one production, Bond managed to mislay both a live bear and a coachload of psychiatric patients. Reynolds commented at the time to the NME: “Having seen his films, which are some of the most brilliant films I’ve ever seen, I thought he was clearly a very clever man, somebody I would very much like to sit down and have a natter with ... Someone whose brain I could pick at.”

Also in 2010 and continuing until mid 2011, Bond directed and appeared in The Blueblack Hussar, a documentary centred on the musical comeback of Adam Ant covering the period from Ant's late 2010 "World Tour Of London", through his early 2011 period in Paris and late Spring 2011 United Kingdom national tour up until his appearance at the summer 2011 Hyde Park Hard Rock Calling festival. In addition to the Ant and Bond, the film also prominently features Reynolds, Mark Ronson, John Robb, Charlotte Rampling, Allen Jones and Ant's backing vocalists Georgina "Twinkle" Leahy and Georgina Baillie. The film also had a cameo appearance by Baillie's then-band, the Poussez Posse, including Fiona Bevan and the three future founder members of The Featherz. The film received selected screenings in 2013 and 2014 and was released on DVD in July 2014.

In 2018, Bond produced a documentary, titled An Artist 's Eyes, about painter Chris Moon.

In 2022, Bond was appointed an honorary member of The Raymond Roussel Society. He was awarded the Raymond Roussel Society Medal in Madrid, during an event at Filmoteca Española. The award was presented to Bond by the artist Joan Bofill-Amargós, president of The Raymond Roussel Society, in conjunction with a screening of Bond's film "Dalí in New York."

Bond was separated from his wife Moira, whom he married in 1984 and had four children. His daughter, Rebecca, died in 2018. He dated cinematographer Mary-Rose Storey from 1999. Bond died at a nursing home in Twickenham, on 21 December 2024, at the age of 87.

== Selected works ==
=== Television ===
- The Pity of War BBC2, 1964 tx. 4 August 1964, script/director
- George Orwell 1903–1950 1965 BBC2, tx.20/11/1965, script/director
- Dali in New York BBC2, 1966 tx.8/8/1966, producer/director
- Exit 19 BBC2 1966 tx.8/8/1966, The Editor
- The South Bank Show ITV, usually as producer/director
  - Werner Herzog tx.16/5/1982 ITV
  - Patricia Highsmith – A Gift for Murder ITV (tx.14/11/1982)
  - Jiri Kylian – Nederlands Dans Theater ITV tx.29/5/1983
  - Catherine Cookson ITV tx.20/11/1983
  - Ivy Compton-Burnett's 'Elders and Betters' ITV tx.3/6/1984
  - Roald Dahl – Fee-Fi-Fo-Fum ITV tx.19/10/1986
  - Colin Thubron – Time Seen as a Road ITV tx.9/2/1992
  - Jean Genet ITV tx.28/2/1993
  - Vanessa Redgrave as Cleopatra ITV tx.9/10/1994
  - Albert Camus – Broken Morning ITV tx.31/8/2003
- Charlotte Rampling 'Waiting For Charlotte' (TV Documentary) (2009), director & writer
- Discovering ... Dali, First episode of a four-part documentary series. 3DD Productions for Sundance Film Festival, (2010), director, writer and co-producer

=== Film ===
- Separation (1967), producer/director
- The Other Side of the Underneath (1972), producer/co-cinematographer
- Vibration (1975), co-director, cinematographer
- Anti-Clock (1979), producer/co-director
- It Couldn't Happen Here (1988), script/producer/director
- The Blueblack Hussar (2013), director/co-star
- An Artist's Eyes (2018), director

=== Stage ===
- Vagina Rex and the Gas Oven (1969), director, starring Victor Spinetti
- A New Communion for Freaks, Prophets and Witches (1971), producer

=== Advertising and music ===
- Maxell, Captain Bird’s Eye, Heart and Always on My Mind by the Pet Shop Boys.
