= Andrea Newman =

English writer (1938–2019)

Andrea Newman (7 February 1938 – 9 November 2019) was an English writer of fiction.

== Biography ==
Andrea Newman was born in Dover, Kent. An only child, her father, a reporter on the Kentish Mercury, was born in India. Her mother, who worked in an office during World War II, was born in Jamaica. She taught at a grammar school after graduating with a degree in English from Westfield College, University of London. A film version of her novel Three into Two Won't Go (1967), with a screenplay by Edna O'Brien, was released in 1969. It starred Rod Steiger and Claire Bloom. It was directed by Peter Hall.

She adapted one of her short stories "The Night of the Stag" for The Frighteners, an anthology series produced by London Weekend Television (LWT). Helen: A Woman of Today was another LWT drama recounting the side of a wronged wife for which Newman wrote two episodes. Having been commissioned by Tony Wharmby for both projects, Newman sent him a copy of A Bouquet of Barbed Wire (1969) as a present; the book was by then out of print.

Newman wrote the adaptation of her sixth novel for television. Broadcast in early 1976, Bouquet of Barbed Wire (losing the indefinite article) as a seven-part serial, it attracted an audience of 20 million viewers. In a 2010 interview, Newman recalled her work on the adaptation: "I never set out to shock, just to tell a story about an imaginary family, but I imagine most people would still disapprove of hitting your pregnant wife and having sex with her mother." Its sequel, Another Bouquet, followed in 1977.

Another novel, Mackenzie, was dramatised by the BBC in 1980, starring Jack Galloway, Lynda Bellingham and Tracey Ullman. This adaptation was followed by Alexa (1968 – adapted for the BBC, 1982), A Sense of Guilt (1988 – adapted for the BBC, 1990), and An Evil Streak (1977 – adapted for LWT, 1999). In 2001, Newman was the writer for the television drama Pretending to Be Judith.

Her other novels include A Share of the World (1964), Mirage (1965), The Cage (1966), and A Gift of Poison (1991). Triangles, a book of 15 short stories, was published in 1990. A notable theme in Andrea Newman's novels was the disintegration of a family after a baby arrives.

Newman married in 1959 while studying at university. However, the couple did not live together for long and eventually divorced. She died in London in November 2019, aged 81, after suffering from breast cancer since 2004.
