= Joan Dowling =

British actress (1928–1954)

- Born: 6 January 1928; Chertsey, Surrey, England
- Died: 31 March 1954 (aged 26); Kensington, London, England
- Resting place: Golders Green Crematorium
- Occupation: Actress
- Spouse: Harry Fowler (m. 1951)

Joan Dowling (6 January 1928 – 31 March 1954) was a British character actress.

== Life and career ==
Dowling was the illegitimate daughter of Vera Dowling. A piece in The Laindon and District Times, on 23 June 2015, written by her cousin John Strickland, says she was born in the house called 'Carlyle', which is one of the turreted bungalows in Laindon High Road North, and brought up by her great-grandmother, Elizabeth Dowling, in Uxbridge. She had a passion for acting, although she was never formally trained, and took roles in small plays, pantomimes and other productions whenever she could. At the age of 14 she approached a London acting agency and was given her first 'proper' part in a small production (title unknown). Her major acting debut came when producer Anthony Hawtrey cast her in the role of Norma Bates in the Joan Temple play No Room at the Inn. The play's first performance was at the Embassy Theatre in July 1945. Subsequently, the play transferred under producer Robert Atkins to the Winter Garden Theatre, Drury Lane. She also played the same role in the 1948 film version, with the screenplay co-written by the famous Welsh author Dylan Thomas and Ivan Foxwell. She signed her first film contract at the age of 17 for Associated British Pictures.

She was perhaps best known for her role as the tomboy Clarry in the 1947 Ealing Studios production Hue and Cry, a story set among the rubble and buildings of post-war London about a group of school children who discover that crooks have been sending coded messages about forthcoming jobs to their gang using the pages of a children's comic. In 1951 she married Harry Fowler, another actor from the cast of Hue and Cry.

== Death ==
On 31 March 1954, Dowling committed suicide in the kitchenette of her home in Farmer Street, Kensington, by gas poisoning.

== Filmography ==
Year	Title	Role	Notes
1947	Hue and Cry	Clarry	
1948	No Room at the Inn	Norma Bates	
1948	Bond Street	Norma	
1949	A Man's Affair	Rose	
1949	For Them That Trespass	Gracie	
1949	Train of Events	Ella	Directed by Basil Dearden
1949	Landfall	Miriam, the Barmaid	
1950	Murder Without Crime	Grena	
1951	Pool of London	Pamela	
1951	The Magic Box	Maggie	Cameo
1952	24 Hours of a Woman's Life	Mrs. Barry	
1952	Women of Twilight	Rosie Gordon	

== Selected stage roles ==
- No Room at the Inn (1945–47)
- A Midsummer Night's Dream (1950) as Puck
- Robinson Crusoe (1952) as Principal Boy

== Radio ==
- Meet the Huggetts (1953, series 1. Replaced after her death by Vera Day)
