= The Strange World of Planet X (film) =

1958 British film by Gilbert Gunn

- Theatrical release poster
- Directed by: Gilbert Gunn
- Written by: Paul Ryder; Josef Ambor; Based on the Rene Ray novel
- Produced by: George Maynard; John Bash
- Starring: Forrest Tucker; Gaby André; Martin Benson
- Cinematography: Josef Ambor
- Edited by: Francis Bieber
- Music by: Robert Sharples
- Distributed by: Eros Films (UK); Distributors Corporation of America (U.S.)
- Release date: February 1958 (UK)
- Running time: 75 minutes
- Country: United Kingdom
- Language: English

The Strange World of Planet X (U.S. title: Cosmic Monsters) is an independently made 1958 British second feature ('B') science fiction horror film directed by Gilbert Gunn and starring Forrest Tucker and Gaby André. It was adapted by Paul Ryder and Joe Ambor from the 1957 Rene Ray The Strange World of Planet X, produced by George Maynard and John Bash.

A made-for-TV serial called The Strange World of Planet X, adapted by Rene Ray in 1956, had aired previously in the UK and was the basis for the feature film.

A monomaniacal scientist creates ultra-sensitive, disruptive magnetic fields, which have unexpected side effects, while also attracting unidentified flying objects from outer space. Strange things begin to happen, including a freak storm, blasts of cosmic radiation that penetrates the Earth's normally protective magnetic shield, and insects and spiders mutating into giant flesh-eating monsters.

== Plot ==
In the south of England, at an isolated laboratory near a small village, physicist Dr. Laird is assisted by American scientist Gilbert Graham. They are performing a series of advanced and dangerous experiments with magnetic fields, while using massive amounts of power in equipment never designed to carry such loads. An accident occurs and injures another assistant, after which a request for a replacement sent to the Ministry of Defence brings Brigadier Cartwright down to investigate. He is accompanied by a woman computer expert, Michele Dupont, who helps to solve Laird's power problem, but not the larger risks inherent in his experiments.

Cartwright is impressed when an interrupted experiment transforms several pieces of steel, not in the test chamber, into useless lumps of powder. His report convinces the Deputy Defence Minister Gerald Wilson to make Laird's project a top priority. He sends down a full security team, led by counter-espionage expert Jimmy Murray. It soon becomes clear, however, that enemy agents are the least of the dangers around Laird's project: The hyper-magnetic fields that he has generated have been affecting the ionosphere, causing unnatural weather patterns, threatening ships at sea hundreds of miles away, and also weakening the magnetic shield that protects the surface of the Earth from cosmic rays. A sudden burst of cosmic radiation from deep space causes brain damage in one local man, turning him into a homicidal maniac, while also causing the insect life to mutate in the area around the village and laboratory.

In the midst of this growing threat to the world's safety, a mysterious "Mr. Smith" arrives in the village. He is well-spoken, with little knowledge of ordinary life, but a great deal of knowledge about magnetic fields, while offering strong opinions about the dangerous experiments that Dr. Laird is conducting. Murray is positive that he is a spy, but Graham and Dupont decide that there is less threat from him than from the obstinate Dr. Laird, who plans on continuing his risky work. Even with "Mr. Smith"'s dire warnings, the forest adjacent to the village is soon swarming with gigantic insects and other mutated monsters. Graham's and Dupont's best efforts fail to stop Dr. Laird, and so they alert the authorities to investigate and send in the military. Later, when leaving the laboratory, Dupont is threatened by the encroaching monsters and becomes trapped in the web of a giant spider. The army arrives in time and is able to destroy all the mutations, saving her life.

"Mr. Smith" reveals to Graham that he is an alien from another world (withholding its name). Later, Graham explains to Dupont, Murray, and Cartwright that "Mr. Smith" is actually an alien emissary from a "Planet X", while also informing them that Laird has gone mad and plans to continue his dangerous experiments. "Mr. Smith" explains that his mission is to warn humanity of the likelihood that Earth's orbit will be destabilized if the magnetic experiments will continue. They are already a threat to "Planet X", having caused the crash on Earth of one of their flying saucers. "Mr. Smith" is asked to help stop Dr. Laird, but being an emissary, he is at first reluctant. However, now faced with a continued threat, he agrees. They quickly leave and go back to stop Dr. Laird, who has already started up his equipment. "Mr. Smith" in the meantime has summoned his flying saucer using a hand-held device, positioning it directly above the laboratory. It fires down multiple rays that obliterate the building. With the coming disaster averted, the alien says his goodbyes to Graham and Dupont and walks to the landed saucer. It quickly becomes just an oval of light ascending into the night sky.

== Cast ==
- Forrest Tucker as Gil Graham
- Gaby André as Michele Dupont
- Martin Benson as Smith
- Alec Mango as Dr. Laird
- Wyndham Goldie as Brigadier Cartwright
- Hugh Latimer as Jimmy Murray
- Dandy Nichols as Mrs. Tucker
- Richard Warner as Inspector Burns
- Patricia Sinclair as Helen Forsyth
- Geoffrey Chater as Gerard Wilson
- Hilda Fenemore as Mrs. Hale

== Release and box office ==
The Strange World of Planet X was released in February 1958 in Britain. It was later released theatrically in the United States on July 7, 1958, double billed with The Crawling Eye.

On its original theatrical release, it was notably unsuccessful at the box office. In the United States the film was distributed by Distributors Corporation of America who had a deal with a series of drive-in movie theaters and some traditional movie houses in Southeast Georgia, Southwest Georgia, coastal Georgia, the Central Savannah River Area, Central Georgia, Northeast Alabama, North Alabama, Northwest Alabama, Southeast Alabama and Northern Indiana. As a result the film was promoted more in those media markets and more widely distributed there.

== Critical reception ==
The Monthly Film Bulletin wrote: "This piece of British science fiction is resourcefully directed, and only some badly handled process work lets the film down. The giant ants, spiders, worms etc are all too obviously stock micro-cinematographic material; and the spectacle of the cast running from them in terror is a trifle absurd. Only a most unpleasant shot of an ant feeding off a human face makes the film unsuitable for younger audiences."

In his January 1, 1959 review in The New York Times, film critic Richard W. Nason did not mention the double feature's top-billed player, Forrest Tucker, and opined that "...The Crawling Eye and The Cosmic Monster do nothing to enhance or advance the copious genre of science fiction."

In British Sound Films: The Studio Years 1928–1959 David Quinlan rated the film as "mediocre", writing: "Dully acted shocker with laughable process work."

The Radio Times Guide to Films gave the film 2/5 stars, writing: "Perhaps because the hysterical levels of 1950s Cold War paranoia that swept America did not reach the same heights here, Britain never really went for big insect movies. However, the odd ones did slip out and here Forrest Tucker is the obligatory square-jawed imported American out to stop irradiated bugs taking over the world. Cheap and cheerful fun."

In The British 'B' Film, Chibnall and McFarlane wrote: "The film's class B special effects did manage a flying saucer and a mutant spider, with French import Gaby André tangled in its giant web, but the picture hardly lived up to the publicity hype: "Unknown Terror from Outer Space! Giant Insects Threaten the World! Deadly Rays Turned Men Into Maniacs! Science-Fiction's Greatest Thrill!" The strangest world revealed here was that of British social life and gender relations."

== Home media ==
The film was first released on VHS tape in the U.S. by Englewood Video, as part of their "Science Fiction Gold" series. Times Forgotten later released the film on DVD.
