= Norma Bates =

Norma Bates may refer to:

- Norma Bates (Passions), a fictional character in the soap opera Passions
- Norma Bates (Psycho), a fictional character in the novel and film series Psycho
- Norma Bates, a fictional character in No Room at the Inn
