= Jack Stewart (actor) =

British actor (1913–1966)

- in A Case for PC 49 (1951)
- Born: 22 March 1913; Larkhall, South Lanarkshire, Scotland
- Died: 2 January 1966 (aged 52); London, England
- Occupation: Actor

Jack Stewart (1913–1966) was a British actor born in Lanarkshire, Scotland. In addition to his movie roles, he appeared in many British television series.

== Selected filmography ==
- The Gorbals Story (1950) – Peter Reilly
- Morning Departure (1950) – Leading Seaman Kelly
- Captain Horatio Hornblower R.N. (1951) – Seaman (uncredited)
- The Dark Light (1951) – Matt
- A Case for PC 49 (1951) – Cutler
- Hunted (1952) – Mr. Campbell
- The Brave Don't Cry (1952) – Willie Duncan
- Ghost Ship (1952) – 2nd Engineer
- The Kidnappers (1953) – Dominie
- Stryker of the Yard (1953)
- The Maggie (1954) – Skipper
- Trouble in the Glen (1954) – Thomas – the Gatekeeper (uncredited)
- Radio Cab Murder (1954) – Mac Gregson
- Johnny, You're Wanted (1956) – Inspector Bennett
- The Intimate Stranger (1956) – Constable Burton (uncredited)
- The Spanish Gardener (1956) – Police Escort
- The Steel Bayonet (1957) – Pvt. Wentworthy
- The Heart Within (1957) – Inspector Matheson
- The Carringford School Mystery (1958) – Gibson
- A Night to Remember (1958) – Stoker (uncredited)
- Kidnapped (1959)
- The Boy and the Bridge (1959) – Bridge Engineer
- Devil's Bait (1959) – Dr. MacKenzie (uncredited)
- Make Mine Mink (1960) – Police Radio Man (uncredited)
- The Frightened City (1961) – Tyson
- Strongroom (1962) – Sergeant McIntyre
- The Pirates of Blood River (1962) – Godfrey Mason
- The Amorous Prawn (1962) – 2nd Pub Customer
- A Matter of Choice (1963) – Mcintyre
- Tom Jones (1963) – MacLachlan
- The Three Lives of Thomasina (1963) – Birnie
- The Intelligence Men (1965) – Radio Man (uncredited)
