= Betty Henderson =

Scottish actress (1907–1979)

Betty Henderson (1907–1979) was a Scottish actress. She was a founding member of the Glasgow Unity Theatre, with whom she played Peggie in both the stage and screen versions of The Gorbals Story. She later appeared as Gran Crombie in High Living. She was married to actor John Cook "Jack" Hislop.

== Selected stage performances ==
Year	Title	Author	Theatre	Role	Director / Company
1943	Song of Tomorrow	John Kincaid	Queens Theatre, Glasgow		Glasgow Unity Theatre
1944	The Two Mrs Camerons	Winifred Carter, Edith Carter	Glasgow Empire Theatre	Anna	
1945	When the Boys Come Home	James Barke	Glasgow Athenaeum	Mary Cochrane	Glasgow Unity Theatre
1946	Juno and the Paycock	Seán O'Casey	The Pleasance Little Theatre, Edinburgh	Juno Boyle	Glasgow Unity Theatre
1947	The Laird O’ Torwatletie	Robert MacLellan	The Pleasance Little Theatre, Edinburgh	The Laird's sister	Glasgow Unity Theatre
1947	The Plough and the Stars	Seán O'Casey	The Pleasance Little Theatre, Edinburgh	Bessie Burgess	Glasgow Unity Theatre Players
1947	The Gorbals Story	Robert McLeish	The Pleasance Little Theatre, Edinburgh	Peggie	Glasgow Unity Theatre Players
1947	Starched Aprons	Ena Lamont Stewart	Adam Smith Hall, Kirkcaldy	Matron	Glasgow Unity Theatre Players
1947	The Lower Depths	Maxim Gorki	The Pleasance Little Theatre, Edinburgh	Kvashnya	Glasgow Unity Theatre Players
1948	Wee Macgreegor	J.J. Bell	The Pleasance Little Theatre, Edinburgh	Mrs. Robinson	Glasgow Unity Theatre Players
1948	The Gorbals Story	Robert McLeish	Garrick Theatre, London; New Theatre Oxford	Peggie	Glasgow Unity Theatre Players
1948	Men Should Weep	Ena Lamont Stewart	Theatre Royal, Glasgow	Maggie Morrison	Glasgow Unity Theatre Players
1951	Pygmalion	George Bernard Shaw	Embassy Theatre (London)	Mrs Pearce	Michael Langham
1951	Common Property	Matthew Service	Embassy Theatre (London)		Robert Mitchell
1951	Women of Twilight	Sylvia Rayman	Embassy Theatre and Vaudeville Theatre (London)	Nurse	
1955	Suspect	Edward Percy and Reginald Denham	Lyceum Theatre, London; Royal Court Theatre	Goudie	Flora Robson
1959	Marigold (musical)	Book and lyrics by Alan Melville, based on the play by Francis R. Pryor and Lizzie Allen Harker	His Majesty's Theatre, Aberdeen; Savoy Theatre	Beenie	Murray Macdonald

== Filmography ==
Year	Title	Role	Notes
1950	The Gorbals Story	Peggie Anderson	
1951	Home to Danger	Mary Williams – Housekeeper	Uncredited
1952	Women of Twilight	Nurse	
1954	The Love Lottery	Minor Role	Uncredited
1954	The Maggie	Campbell's Secretary	
1956	Black Limelight	Jemima	Part of Sunday Night Theatre
1959	The 39 Steps	Mrs McDougal	
1959	Upstairs and Downstairs	Bridget	
1959	Emergency Ward 10	Night Sister	1 episode
1960	Probation Officer	Jessie Logan	1 episode
1962, 1964, 1968	Dr. Finlay's Casebook	4 characters	4 episodes
1963	Suspense	Mima Porteous	Episode Diversion to Danger
1968	High Living	Gran Crombie	6 episodes
