= The Primrose Path (1934 film) =

1934 film

- Short story feature based on the film. Picture Show (19 January 1935)
- Directed by: Reginald Denham
- Written by: Basil Mason
- Based on: 1934 play Flowery Walk by Joan Temple
- Produced by: Reginald Denham
- Starring: Isobel Elsom; Whitmore Humphreys; Max Adrian
- Cinematography: Percy Strong
- Production company: Paramount British Pictures
- Release date: 20 July 1934
- Running time: 70 minutes
- Country: United Kingdom
- Language: English

The Primrose Path (also known as Flowery Walk) is a 1934 British romance film directed by Reginald Denham and starring Isobel Elsom, Whitmore Humphries and Max Adrian. It was written by Basil Mason based on the 1934 play Flowery Walk by Joan Temple, and was produced as a quota quickie by Paramount British Pictures.

The screenplay concerns a doctor's wife who has to choose between her settled life with her husband in a small town or a more turbulent relationship with a successful writer.

== Preservation status ==
The British Film Institute National Archive holds a collection of ephemera and stills but no film or video materials.

== Plot summary ==
Brenda Dorland, in an unhappy marriage, falls in love with David Marlow, a novelist she meets on a cruise, and flees with him to his Italian villa. Brenda's daughter Ianthe, desperate to save the family, rushes to Italy to try to make her mother see reason. She succeeds, and Brenda reconciles with her husband. Meanwhile, Ianthe falls in love with Julian Leigh, David's young collaborator.

== Cast ==
- Isobel Elsom as Brenda Dorland
- Whitmore Humphries as David Marlow
- Max Adrian as Julian Leigh
- Virginia Field as Ianthe Dorland
- Gordon McLeod as Doctor Dorland
- Helen Ferrers as Mrs Hassee
- Ethel Stuart as Fortune

== Reception ==
The Daily Film Renter wrote: "Presented in terms of dialogue, rather than action, film has moments of amusing comedy, but central situations lack conviction, climax missing fire. Settings are attractive, and direction moderately good ... Helen Ferrers contributes one of her fruity dowager studies with effect, and Gordon McLeod is quite good as the harassed doctor. Most of the members of the cast, however, speak with irritatingly affected accents, which become almost intolerable after a time."

Picturegoer wrote: "Slow-moving triangle drama with an artificial atmosphere of sophistication and a conventional plot unredeemed by anything remarkable in the way of acting or characterisation."
