= Women of Twilight (film) =

1952 British film

- Directed by: Gordon Parry
- Written by: Anatole de Grunwald
- Based on: Women of Twilight; 1951 play by Sylvia Rayman
- Produced by: Daniel M. Angel
- Starring: Freda Jackson; Rene Ray; Lois Maxwell
- Cinematography: Jack Asher
- Music by: Allan Gray
- Production company: Romulus Films
- Distributed by: British Lion Films
- Release date: 30 November 1952
- Running time: 89 minutes
- Country: United Kingdom
- Language: English
- Budget: £49,216
- Box office: £154,620

Women of Twilight (also known as Twilight Women) is a 1952 British film directed by Gordon Parry starring Freda Jackson, Rene Ray and Lois Maxwell The screenplay was by Anatole de Grunwald based on the 1951 play of the same title by Sylvia Rayman. It was the first British film to receive the recently introduced X certificate.

== Plot ==
Helen Allistair is the sadistic proprietress of a grim boarding house providing accommodation for unmarried young mothers and pregnant women. One of these is Vivianne Bruce, carrying the child of nightclub singer Jerry Nolan, who is about to be hanged for murder. Vivianne is befriended by fellow-lodger Christine, and while Christine is away, her child falls ill. Because Helen refuses to allow a doctor to be called, the child dies. Vivianne confronts Helen, who is subsequently arrested. Christine marries and offers to adopt Vivianne's baby.

== Cast ==
- Freda Jackson as Helen Allistair
- Rene Ray as Vivianne Bruce
- Lois Maxwell as Christine Ralston
- Laurence Harvey as Jerry Nolan
- Vida Hope as Jess Smithson
- Joan Dowling as Rosie Gordon
- Dora Bryan as Olga Lambert
- Dorothy Gordon as Sally
- Ingeborg Wells as Lilli
- Mary Germaine as Veronica
- Clare James as Molly
- Betty Henderson as nurse
- Arthur Mullard as uncredited
- Dandy Nichols as uncredited

== Production ==
Completing production in the second week of June 1952, the film version was made at the Gate Studios, Borehamwood and retained Rene Ray, Vida Hope and Betty Henderson from the original West End production. Freda Jackson and Joan Dowling were cast in key roles reminiscent of the parts they had played in the 1945 play No Room at the Inn and its 1948 film version.

John and James Woolf of Romulus Films had first enquired about the property even before its presentation at the Embassy Theatre; the leading players they had in mind at this early stage were Flora Robson and Ida Lupino. Among the changes made to Rayman's play was the introduction of Vivianne's condemned lover Jerry Nolan (called Johnny Stanton in the play), a role assigned to the Woolf contract player Laurence Harvey. In addition, the enigmatic character of Laura became a continental boarder called Lilli.

The British Board of Film Censors objected to some of the script's dialogue; to ensure an X certificate, "your rotten little bastards" had to be changed to "your rotten little brats", "you sanctimonious little bitch" to "you sanctimonious little fool" and "I was raped" to "I was taken advantage of." Caution was also advised regarding the climactic scene in which Helen throws the pregnant Vivianne down a flight of stairs.

According to producer Daniel Angel, his original plan had been to couple the film with another 'social problem' picture (again based on a controversial play), Cosh Boy (1953) directed by Lewis Gilbert. "Jimmy Woolf had these two stories," he said, "and we made the films with the idea of showing them in cinemas together on the one programme. They turned out better than we'd expected and we showed them separately."

== Release ==
Trade shown on 4 November 1952, the film opened at the Plaza, Piccadilly Circus in London on 15 January 1953, with general release following from 23 February.

=== Home media ===
On 23 February 2010, Women of Twilight and Cosh Boy (under their US titles of Twilight Women and The Slasher) were united on a double-feature DVD release from VCI Entertainment. The cover design for this release featured Freda Jackson, not in Women of Twilight, but in her other "vicious landlady" role, Mrs Voray in No Room at the Inn (1948).

== Reception ==
Press responses ranged from "Though grossly overacted by all in sight, the film will draw pity from those who know how harsh the world can be" to "Before virtue triumphs we are treated to a great deal of horror and degradation ... It is not only rapacious boarding-house keepers and baby-farmers who exploit the misfortunes of unmarried mothers. Where would popular playwrights and film producers be without them?"

The Monthly Film Bulletin wrote: This sordid story has been dealt with in an unimaginative, selfconscious manner, with the emphasis on the sensational. ... The film, which infers that it has performed a social duty in bringing these unpleasant facts before the public, could have done better by dropping the pointless initial Soho nightclub scenes and introducing a sequence showing what social services there are available for the unmarried mother. But Women of Twilight, the first British production to receive an "X"* certificate from the censor, is perhaps scarcely remarkable for truth to life."

Sunday Dispatch, January 1953: "A study of low life and bad morals in the Russian manner. A houseful of unhappy unmarried mothers will arouse the sympathy of all but the most censorious. Many of the original stage cast repeat their lifelike performances on the screen. If the aim of tragedy is to purge the soul with pity, this is indeed a great tragic film."

Daily Telegraph, January 1953: "I missed Women of Twilight as a play because I chose to; I saw the film because I must. This study of the conditions in which unmarried mothers live and have their children, and not uncommonly watch them die, is powerful, sordid, disturbing and perhaps not so overdrawn as some good easy people think. If it helps to awaken the public conscience and sharpen official vigilance it will be justified."

The Star, January 1953: "First thing to be said about Women of Twilight (Plaza) is that it is designed as a shocker – and it shocks ... But if you enjoy watching women snarling, scratching or pulling each other's hair out, in sordid surroundings, this is your picture."

Daily Sketch, January 1953: "Here is an adult, honest drama which focuses attention on a real-life problem to which none of us should close our eyes. But I warn you; the young actresses – a male face seldom appears in this film – throw themselves wholeheartedly into their sad parts."

The Spectator, January 1953: "Miss Jackson is an old hand at the silky sinister, the velvet vile, and as usual is admirably alarming. Her wickedness seeps through her mask of virtue like dampness through a newly painted wall; her every sweetness is threaded with a shiver ... This film has all the ingredients of a Grand Guignol, but being underplayed in the true English fashion, and quietly directed by Mr Gordon Parry, it has turned out to be a seemingly plausible record of man's inhumanity to woman and a woman's attempt to cash in on it."
