= Serjeant Musgrave's Dance =

Play written by John Arden

Private Sparky and Annie in the 1965 revival.

Serjeant Musgrave's Dance, An Un-historical Parable is a play by English playwright John Arden, written in 1959 and premiered at the Royal Court Theatre on October 22 of that year. In Arden's introductory note to the text, he describes it as "a realistic, but not a naturalistic" play. Four songs are performed that Arden writes should be sung not to an original score but to "folk-song airs." Music for this production was composed by Dudley Moore. It was the first public performance of his own original compositions.

== Plot ==
The work follows three privates in the British Army and their sergeant, all of whom are deserters from a foreign imperialist war. Serjeant Musgrave and his men, Hurst, Sparky and Attercliffe, come to a northern English coal mining town in 1879, posing as a recruiting party. The community is in the grip of a coal strike and cut off by winter snow. The one means of reaching the town is by canal barge. They arrive in the company of the Bargee, a foul-mouthed, disrespectful individual who teases and abuses everyone, especially those in authority. In the local inn the soldiers meet Mrs Hitchcock, who runs the inn, and the barmaid Annie. The soldiers are greeted by the mayor, parson and constable, who ask them to recruit men in hopes of alleviating some of the town's unemployment as a way to rid the town of their economic dead weight. Musgrave pretends that this is indeed his goal, and asks Mrs Hitchcock about Billy Hicks, a dead fellow soldier from the mining town. It is revealed that Billy was the father of Annie's illegitimate child, but the baby died, and Annie's sanity has suffered from the loss of both Billy and her child.

That night in the churchyard, the soldiers talk among themselves and reveal their real purpose: appalled by a violent incident where five innocent men were killed, to avenge the death of a single soldier, they have come to the town to convince the people that the colonial war and the violence used are wrong. The single soldier was Billy Hicks, and the reason they chose this particular town is that it was where he was born.

Continuing the pretence of recruiting townsmen, Musgrave throws a sort of party in Mrs Hitchcock's inn, with free drink for all. Private Sparky tries to impress Annie, but she prefers the handsome Hurst and promises to come to him that night. However, he later rejects her, and she goes to Sparky. They agree to run away together, but are overheard by Hurst, who tries to stop them. In the following struggle, Sparky is accidentally killed by falling on a bayonet, held by the pacifist Attercliffe. Serjeant Musgrave rushes in and they hide the body, when they are told that the colliers are stealing the soldiers' guns. The mayor arrives to say that the town is no longer cut off by snow and the dragoons have been called for. Musgrave announces he will hold a recruiting meeting the next morning.

Instead of recruiting townsmen, Musgrave takes out a Gatling gun. The gun is loaded and pointed at the audience. Then the soldiers hoist up the skeleton of Billy Hicks on a lamppost, still dressed in uniform. Musgrave dances below it reciting a rhyme:

... Up he goes, and no-one knows, who it was that raised him. ... He sits on your back and you'll never, never lose him....

Musgrave talks about the atrocities that followed the soldier's death, and explains that since this single death caused five on the other side, five times five townsfolk should be killed to avenge their deaths. Attercliffe refuses to take part in any more violence, but Hurst is quite ready to shoot. Annie intervenes and tells everyone of Sparky's death, producing his bloody tunic as evidence. Hurst makes one last desperate attempt to shoot into the crowd but is overpowered by Musgrave and Attercliffe. The dragoons arrive, shoot Hurst and imprison the two remaining soldiers, who will be hanged later. Ever the jester, the Bargee leads the townsfolk in singing "Michael Finnegan" as a way of "beginning again".

In the final scene, Attercliffe and Musgrave sit in their cell and talk about their differing views of life. Musgrave has always lived by rules, regulations and honour. Attercliffe tells how he lost his wife to a greengrocer, who looked like "a rat grinning through a brush", but was a better man because he fed people, as he fed Attercliffe's ex-wife, which Attercliffe himself could not do. In the end, Attercliffe seems to say, it is everyday life that matters, not ideals.

== Characters ==
- Serjeant "Black Jack" Musgrave is a lifetime soldier, a man who believes in strict adherence to the rule book. His faith in order was destroyed by the atrocities in the colonies, and he wants to serve justice, by the book, on those who sent him there.
- Private Attercliffe is an older soldier, broken in spirit by the events he witnessed and in which he participated, killing a young girl.
- Private Hurst is a brute, who is happy to kill if necessary, and is following Musgrave to work out his aggression on new victims. He is also a womaniser, and is the first one of the soldiers Annie attaches herself to.
- Private Sparky is the youngest, more of a joker, and is less committed to Musgrave's mission than the others.
- Annie, apparently a barmaid at Mrs. Hitchcock's inn, may also be the house prostitute. It is never clear if her attentions to the soldiers are motivated by romance or other considerations.
- Mrs Hitchcock, something of a Mother Courage figure, is a survivor. As long as she can keep serving food and ale, and gets paid for it, she can go on. She develops as a kind of anti-Musgrave. As she says, commenting on Musgrave's rejection of "life and love" for his rules, because life and love leads to chaos: "We had life and love. You came in with yer rules and honour. It's arsy-versy to what you said, but its still chaos in the end, isn't it?"
- The Mayor, also the owner of the pit. Although in charge of the town, he is actually trapped by the realities of his business. He cannot yield to the strikers.
- The Parson, a Church authority figure, cold and aloof, who (as in many British dramas) also represents the religious side of state authority. He even uses the metaphor of a sword in a speech to the townspeople.
- The Constable, nominally the arm of the law, actually in the pay of the Mayor, and unable to exert real authority. He encourages Musgrave to "recruit" the town's troublemakers, using the method of getting them drunk and carrying them off to the barracks.
- The colliers, three men of different demeanours, named simply "Slow Collier", "Earnest Collier", and "Pugnacious Collier", who represent the townspeople in the play. They also play out their own internal rivalries, as when the Slow Collier drunkenly recites a rhyme suggesting he had sex with the wife of the Pugnacious Collier, resulting in a brawl.
- Bludgeon, the Bargee, something of a jester in the play, but also able to drive the action by saying what others cannot. At times he acts almost like a master of ceremonies, or a Brechtian narrator.
- The Officer of Dragoons, in the playwright's own words a deus ex machina who sets the world to rights. He arrives with arrest warrants for the soldiers, two of whom are already dead, and bids the Mayor and townsfolk to carry on with their lives.
- A Trooper of Dragoons who shoots Hurst and then holds the other soldiers at gunpoint for the Officer.

== Meaning ==
Arden writes of the meaning of the play: "I think that many of us must at some time have felt an overpowering urge to match some particularly outrageous piece of violence with an even greater and more outrageous retaliation. Musgrave tries to do this: and the fact that the sympathies of the play are clearly with him in his original horror, and then turn against him and his intended remedy, seems to have bewildered people... Again I would suggest that an unwillingness to dwell upon unpleasant situations that do not immediately concern us is a general human trait, and recognition of it need imply neither cynicism nor despair. Complete pacifism is a very hard doctrine: and if this play appears to advocate it with perhaps some timidity, it is probably because I am naturally a timid man -- and also because I know that if I am hit I very easily hit back: and I do not care to preach too confidently what I am not sure I can practise."

== Reception ==
The play did poorly in its first run and the production lost money. Most critical reviews of the first production were deprecating or at least showed a lack of understanding of the play's message. At the time the play was written, public opinion had not soured on military actions as it did later in the 1960s, primarily due to the coverage of the Vietnam War. The only contemporary British military actions comparable to the colonial conflicts were the Malayan Emergency, and the Mau Mau Uprising. It was only later, in the light of the Vietnam War, that these conflicts also were reported unfavourably, producing a context in which audiences could appreciate Arden's message.

== Original cast ==
Several people who became well-known names in stage and television were involved in the first production. The director was Lindsay Anderson. Music was provided by Dudley Moore.

- Donal Donnelly ... Private Sparky
- Alan Dobie ... Private Hurst
- Frank Finlay ... Private Attercliffe
- James Bree ... Bludgeon, a bargee
- Ian Bannen ... Serjeant Musgrave
- Richard Caldicot ... The Parson
- Freda Jackson ... Mrs Hitchcock
- Patsy Byrne ... Annie
- Michael Hunt ... The Constable
- Stratford Johns ... The Mayor
- Jack Smethurst ... A Slow Collier
- Colin Blakely ... A Pugnacious Collier
- Harry Gwynn Davies ... Walsh, an Earnest Collier
- Barry Wilsher ... Trooper of Dragoons
- Clinton Greyn ... An Officer of Dragoons

== Adaptations ==
In 1961 Arden adapted his play for television: some cuts to the text allowed the soldiers' real purpose in visiting the town—a requital for the death of Billy Hicks while on service overseas—to be expressed in clearer relief. The well-received production was directed by Stuart Burge and starred Patrick McGoohan, with members of the original cast (including Donal Donnelly and Freda Jackson) reprising their stage roles.

A radio adaptation Serjeant Musgrave's Dance directed by Toby Swift with Iain Glen as Musgrave was broadcast on BBC Radio 3 on 14 December 2003.
