= Freda Jackson =

English actress (1907–1990)

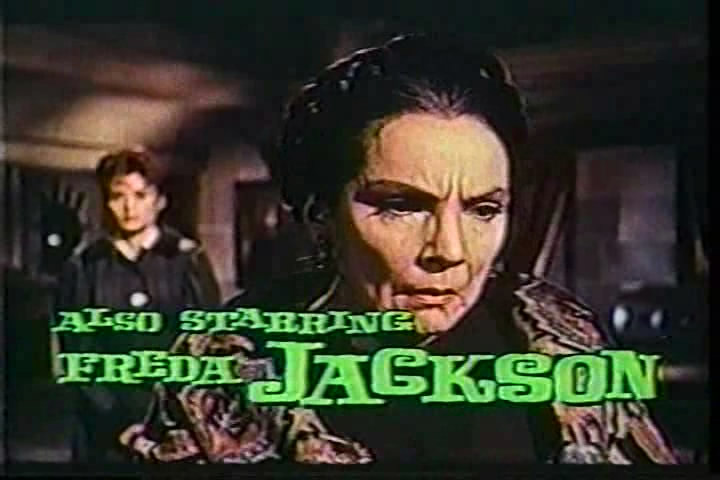
- Freda Jackson in The Brides of Dracula (1960)
- Born: Freda Maud Jackson; 29 December 1907; Nottingham, Nottinghamshire, England
- Died: 20 October 1990 (aged 82); Northampton, Northamptonshire, England
- Years active: 1934–1981
- Spouse: Henry Bird (m. 1937)
- Children: 1

Freda Maud Jackson (29 December 1907 – 20 October 1990) was an English stage actress who also worked in film and television.

== Early life and career ==
Jackson was born in Nottingham in 1907. She made her stage debut on 1 January 1934 at the Northampton Repertory Theatre in Sweet Lavender. During this period, she reputedly had a relationship with Errol Flynn, a fellow company member. After two years with the Northampton Rep, she first appeared in London on 13 July 1936 in The Sacred Flame at the Q Theatre, afterwards touring with Emlyn Williams in Williams' play Night Must Fall. In 1938 she joined the Old Vic company, touring with them the following year in Europe and Egypt, and in 1940 she became part of the Stratford Memorial Theatre company. Her film debut was in Mountains O'Mourne (1938); other early films included Powell and Pressburger's A Canterbury Tale, Laurence Olivier's Henry V (both 1944) and David Lean's Great Expectations (1946).

In July 1945 she scored a personal success at the Embassy Theatre in London's Swiss Cottage, playing the sadistic landlady Mrs Voray in Joan Temple's No Room at the Inn. She also featured in the play's West End transfer and in the film adaptation released in 1948. A few years later she played a similar role, Mrs Allistair, in the stage and screen versions of Sylvia Rayman's Women of Twilight (1952). "I wonder," she wrote in 1954, "if [my fellow actors] ever dreamed when we were treading the Shakespearean boards together at Stratford 14 years ago that their light-hearted Nerissa, Maria and Mrs Quickly would, in less years than it takes to say Sweeney Todd, be treading so heavily the darkest paths of crime—her name a horrid by-word, a source of cosy shudders ... Seriously though, dear public, you must please believe that I was not always so depraved a character."

== Later career ==
In July 1955, back at Northampton, she played the role she later listed as her favourite in Who's Who in the Theatre – Marguerite Gautier in The Lady of the Camellias. Later stage appearances included the Gypsy in Camino Real (Phoenix Theatre 1957), Duel of Angels (Apollo Theatre 1958), Mrs Hitchcock in Sergeant Musgrave's Dance (Royal Court Theatre 1959), Gunhild in John Gabriel Borkman (Mermaid Theatre 1961), the title role in Mother Courage (Bristol Old Vic 1961), Naked (Royal Court Theatre 1963), a 1967 tour of Arsenic and Old Lace, and Maria Helliwell in When We Are Married (Strand Theatre 1970).

Her later films included Lewis Gilbert's The Good Die Young (1954) as Joan Collins' mother, George Cukor's Bhowani Junction (1956), Ralph Thomas' A Tale of Two Cities (1958), Terence Fisher's The Brides of Dracula (1960), Tony Richardson's Tom Jones (1963), two directed by Michael Winner (West 11, 1963, and The Jokers, 1967), Daniel Haller's Die, Monster, Die! (1965) as Boris Karloff's wife, and two featuring Ray Harryhausen creature effects: The Valley of Gwangi (1969) and Clash of the Titans (1981). Summarising her film career, David Quinlan wrote that she "created some memorably grim portraits ... fewer than one would have liked, but she was really too ferocious for supporting roles."

== Personal life ==
Jackson married artist Henry Bird in 1937; according to Bird's obituary in The Times, "His first sight of her was her face, suspended halfway up the stage curtain, painted green as a witch in a production of Macbeth at the Royal Theatre, Northampton. With typical decisiveness he said: 'That's the woman for me.'" They lived at Hardingstone House, Northampton. Their son, Julian, initially a psychiatrist, became an actor in his 60s.

Jackson died in 1990 at the age of 82. She was cremated at the Counties Crematorium, Northampton.

== Partial filmography ==
- A Canterbury Tale (1944) – Prudence Honeywood
- Henry V (1944) – Mistress Quickly
- Beware of Pity (1946) – Gypsy
- Great Expectations (1946) – Mrs.Joe
- No Room at the Inn (1948) – Mrs. Voray
- Flesh and Blood (1951) – Mrs. Hannah
- Mr. Denning Drives North (1951) – Ma Smith
- Women of Twilight (1952) – Mrs. Helen 'Nelly' Alistair
- The Good Die Young (1954) – Mrs. Freeman
- The Crowded Day (1954) – Mrs. Morgan
- Bhowani Junction (1956) – The Sandani
- The Last Man to Hang (1956) – Mrs. Tucker
- The Flesh Is Weak (1957) – Trixie
- A Tale of Two Cities (1958) – The Vengeance
- The Brides of Dracula (1960) – Greta
- The Shadow of the Cat (1961) – Clara, the Maid
- Greyfriars Bobby (1961) – Old woman caretaker
- Boy with a Flute (1964, short) – Ann Winters
- Tom Jones (1963) – Mrs. Seagrim
- West 11 (1963) – Mrs. Hartley
- The Third Secret (1964) – Mrs. Bales
- Die, Monster, Die! (1965) – Letitia Witley
- The Jokers (1967) – Mrs. Pervis
- The Valley of Gwangi (1969) – Tia Zorina
- Randall and Hopkirk (Deceased) (1970) – Mrs. Evans (Episode 26 – The Smile Behind the Veil)
- Clash of the Titans (1981) – Stygian Witch #3 (final film role)
