= A Touch of Larceny =

- Theatrical release poster
- Directed by: Guy Hamilton
- Screenplay by: Roger MacDougall; Guy Hamilton; Ivan Foxwell
- Based on: The Megstone Plot by Paul Winterton
- Produced by: Ivan Foxwell
- Starring: James Mason; Vera Miles; George Sanders
- Cinematography: John Wilcox
- Edited by: Alan Osbiston
- Music by: Philip Green
- Distributed by: Paramount Pictures
- Release dates: December 1959 (United Kingdom); 16 March 1960 (United States)
- Running time: 93 minutes
- Countries: United Kingdom; United States
- Language: English

A Touch of Larceny is a 1959 black-and-white comedy film directed by Guy Hamilton, and starring James Mason, George Sanders and Vera Miles. It was written by Roger MacDougall, Hamilton and Ivan Foxwell based on the novel The Megstone Plot by Paul Winterton (as Andrew Garve).

== Plot ==
A British World War II naval war hero, Commander Max "Rammer" Easton now holds a mid-level staff position at the British Admiralty, where he is underemployed, and he spends most of his free time playing squash and pursuing women.

While at his private club, he meets Sir Charles Holland and later Holland's American companion, Virginia Killain. As soon as Holland goes away for a few days, Max makes a play for Virginia, but she is engaged to be married to Holland and is offended by Max describing him as "dull" and tells Max she considers him to be a rake. Undaunted, he persists until she agrees to have lunch with him.

They later go sailing on Easton's sailboat. Observing that Virginia is impressed by Holland's old school wealth, Max claims that it is easy to acquire money, which she challenges, so on the spot he comes up with an unscrupulous scheme to demonstrate to her just how easy it is. He relates how, after suddenly disappearing under suspicious circumstances, he would leave behind clues and red herrings leading others to jump to the conclusion that he is a traitor, having stolen top secret British Admiralty documents from his division, then defected to the Soviet Union. The scandal would leak and spread through the British press like wildfire. Upon his sudden and surprising return, he would sue the press for libel, raking in thousands of pounds in out-of-court settlements.

When she rejects his marriage proposal and says she doesn't want to see him again, Max decides to implement his scheme, sailing away to the Skerries (Skerry) off the Scottish coast, where he sinks his boat and makes a camp. In due course, he is publicly branded a traitor by the press, all according to his plan. Virginia is at first amused by all this, but then becomes annoyed when she realizes he has actually gone through with it. When she tells Sir Charles, he is outraged and says something must be done. Max's elaborate plan backfires, however, when just as he is about to raise the alarm and get rescued, things go awry and he becomes marooned for real.

After eventually being rescued, Max is astonished to learn that he was rescued after a "message in a bottle" was found on a beach. Sir Charles reveals to authorities everything that Virginia told him about Max's hoax. When confronted, Max's quick thinking frees him from suspicion of any wrong-doing. He then visits Virginia to tell her that, instead of suing the press, he now plans on selling "the true story" of his survival and rescue to the very same press who libelled him. When Sir Charles arrives and berates Max, it becomes clear to Charles that he has lost Virginia and he leaves, after which she succumbs and agrees to marry Max.

== Cast ==
- James Mason as Commander Max Easton
- George Sanders as Sir Charles Holland
- Vera Miles as Virginia Killain
- Oliver Johnston as Minister
- Robert Flemyng as Commander John Larkin
- William Kendall as Tom
- Duncan Lamont as Gregson
- Harry Andrews as Captain Graham
- Peter Barkworth as Sub-lieutenant Brown
- Rachel Gurney as Clara Holland
- Martin Stephens as John Holland
- Waveney Lee as Marcia Holland
- Charles Carson as Robert Holland
- Junia Crawford as Susan
- Henry B. Longhurst as club member

== Reception ==
=== Critical ===
The Monthly Film Bulletin wrote: "This amiable picaresque joke, reminiscent of several Cary Grant films of the 'thirties, might have stood a better chance given direction inventive enough to hide the story's flimsy and outmoded framework. But the infelicitous teaming of James Mason and George Sanders as two sides of a romantic triangle soon becomes only too apparent in the light of writing and treatment without edge, levity or tempo; and it is left to a generally resourceful supporting cast to salvage what humour they can."

Kine Weekly wrote: "Smooth and sophisticated, but not too subtle, triangle comedy, alternating between the Admiralty, Belgravia and a remote Scottish island. ... It hasn't a lot of action, despite a Robinson Crusoe sequence, but James Mason as the 'hero,' Vera Miles as the 'girl,' and George Sanders as the 'other fellow,' ably directed, see that no laughs or lines are thrown away. Something, new, gay and intriguing, it's quality, as well as popular, divertissement."

In The New York Times, A.H. Weiler wrote: "The comedy is a somewhat bland spoof that tends more toward genteel banter, faint whimsy and romance than to belly laughs and explosive ideas. ... Mr. MacDougall and his collaborators have devised civilized and, on occasion, mildly funny lines for their cast to speak.

=== Box office ===
Kine Weekly called it a "money maker" at the British box office in 1960.

== Accolades ==
A Touch of Larceny was nominated for the 1961 BAFTA award for Best British Screenplay.

== See also ==
- 1959 in film
