= John and James Woolf =

British film producers

Sir John Woolf (15 March 1913, London – 28 June 1999, London) and his brother James Woolf (2 March 1920, London – 30 May 1966, Beverly Hills, California) were British film producers. John and James founded the production companies Romulus Films and Remus Films, which were active during the 1950s and 1960s, and the distribution company Independent Film Distributors (known as IFD), which was active 1950–59 and handled the UK distribution of films such as The African Queen and Gift Horse, as well as several films made by their two production companies (such as Room at the Top).

== Biography ==
John and James Woolf were the sons of the British producer C. M. Woolf (1879–1942), who was co-producer with Michael Balcon of two early Alfred Hitchcock films, Downhill (1927) and Easy Virtue (1928). Woolf senior was a major figure at Gaumont British and established General Film Distributors in 1937.

John and James were educated at Eton, while the older brother also attended Institut Montana, Switzerland. John was the sales manager of General Film Distributors until it was taken over by the Rank Organisation James worked for Columbia Pictures in the Hollywood publicity department.

John Woolf served in World War II. In February 1943 the army refused to give him leave to take over GFD. Charles Woolf died in 1943 and John Wolf inherited half his father's holdings in GFD; the other half went to John's brother Maurice and sister Rosemary.

He was demobilised in 1945 with the rank of major.

== Romulus Films and Independent Film Distributors ==
When their father died in 1943, J. Arthur Rank became director of General Film Distributors. John returned from the Army as joint managing director. However, neither John or James enjoyed working for a large corporation.

In 1948, they went to S.G. Warburg for financial backing for two new companies, Independent Film Distributors, and a production arm, Romulus Films. According to critic Ronald Bergan in his obituary of Sir John Woolf: "Their aims were ambitious: to produce artistically valuable and yet commercially viable films, whose subjects would be wider than the Little Englanderism of British pictures of the period, and featuring big stars." James Woolf's obituary in The Times stated that John "was the main financial brain and James primarily in charge of artistic policy."

According to John Woolf, "Independent [the distribution arm] started by putting up seventy per cent of the cost of a number of films, most of which weren't very successful. In fact I started off as badly as my father [CM Woolf] had with General Film Distributors." He said he had more success with films in which they produced directly as Romulus.

Filmink magazine later wrote:

From the beginning, the Woolfs ued a two-prong attack in their movie making career – they would produce lower budgeted films aimed primarily at the British domestic market, and big international pictures with Hollywood stars and finance from major studios. They didn’t have a particular preference for any kind of film but worked in commercial genres – comedies, thrillers, war/adventure, sexy melodramas. Their films were almost always based on some pre-existing IP – a novel, a play – and almost always constructed as star vehicles.

Their first film was Shadow of the Eagle (1950), shot party in Italy, which was a box office flop. This was followed by two co-productions with Hollywood: I'll Get You for This (1951) (or Lucky Nick Cain) with George Raft and Coleen Gray, and Pandora and the Flying Dutchman (1951) with James Mason and Ava Gardner. The latter was produced and directed by Albert Lewin who had begun to prepare the film for MGM, but James Woolf discovered on a Hollywood visit that the studio had cancelled the project because of Lewin's problems with the House Un-American Activities Committee; Romulus stepped in to co finance. John Woolf recalled "Pandora wasn't all that successful, although it covered its costs eventually. It was a rather turgid film but we didn't have much experience as film producers then... It was too long and I couldn't get Lewin to agree to cut it, but in many ways it was a brilliant film." The film was one of the most popular films at the British box office 1951.

Romulus' next three films were more British-based efforts: two thrillers, She Shall Have Murder (1950) and The Late Edwina Black (1951), and a comedy directed by Henry Cornelius, The Galloping Major (1952). These did not perform particularly well commercially and resulted in the brothers deciding to concentrate on transatlantic projects.

=== John Huston ===
The Woolf brothers were approached by Sam Spiegel, looking for finance for The African Queen (1951), which was going to star Humphrey Bogart and Katharine Hepburn, and be directed by John Huston. Alexander Korda, an old friend of their father, advised against being involved: "Two old people going up and down an African river . . . who's going to be interested in that? You'll be bankrupt!". The brothers decided to cover below the line costs of £250,000. The movie was a large success critically and commercially (making $6 million on an estimated cost of $800,000), and established Romulus within the industry.

The brothers wanted to make another film with Huston and suggested Moulin Rouge (1952) starring Jose Ferrer. Made for a budget of over $1 million, it was another large hit at the box office. A third collaboration with the director, Beat the Devil (1953), was less successful - John Woolf called it a "disaster" on release although the film subsequently developed a cult reputation. A key figure on both behind the scenes was Jack Clayton, who became an important executive for Romulus.

During this period, Romulus continued to finance other films such as the comedy Treasure Hunt (1952). The Woolfs formed a relationship with producer Daniel Angel which resulted in the social drama films Women of Twilight (1952), directed by Gordon Parry, and Cosh Boy (1952), directed by Lewis Gilbert. Angel recalled, "Jimmy Woolf had these two stories, we made the films with the idea of showing them in cinemas together on the one programme. They turned out better than we'd expected and we showed them separately." Women of Twilight featured Laurence Harvey who Romulus put under contract, due to the enthusiasm of James Woolf who became a great champion of the actor.

Romulus then invested in the comedy Innocents in Paris (1953), directed by Parry, and the crime film, The Good Die Young (1954), directed by Gilbert. Gilbert says James Woolf found the original book and insisted Laurence Harvey be cast; there were some American actors in the cast to appeal to American audiences.

Romulus did two films based on stage plays: the courtroom drama Carrington V.C. (1955) starring David Niven, and I Am a Camera (1955), directed by Cornelius from the stories of Christopher Isherwood, with Harvey in a key role. The latter was popular at the British box office. In January 1955 James Woolf announced:

Although there are a number of cases where pictures bring in large grosses in Europe and fail in America, the single common denominator for boxoffice success throughout the world seems to be the comedy feature. One of the main reasons our company embarked upon 'I Am a Camera' was the simple fact that we found an acute shortage of adult comedy films.

=== Alex Korda and Room at the Top ===
In the mid '50s the Woolf brothers helped provide almost £1 million to help finance four films for Alex Korda: Richard III (1955) from Laurence Olivier, A Kid for Two Farthings (1955) from Carol Reed, Summertime (1955) from David Lean and Storm Over the Nile (1956) from Terence Young and Zoltan Korda. All four were successful, ending Korda's career on a note of triumph prior to his death in 1956. The popularity of A Kid for Two Farthings led to Romulus financing a short, The Bespoke Overcoat (1956), which launched Jack Clayton's career as a director and won an Oscar for Best Short Film.

Romulus made some more parochial comedies based on stage successes: Sailor Beware (1956) directed by Gordon Parry (a huge hit at the British box office), Dry Rot (1956) and Three Men in a Boat (1956), starring Harvey. It also financed The Iron Petticoat (1956), an attempt at a comedy with international appeal starring Katharine Hepburn and Bob Hope); this was a difficult production of producer Harry Saltzman but was profitable at the box office. According to Sue Harper and Vince Porter:

Outwardly modest and shy, John Woolf generally made films from successful and well-received novels or plays. He and James both had a keen sense of what might be popular in both the British and the American markets. Their films have no recurrent theme, unless it be that of a determined individual, usually a man, who is at odds with his immediate milieu. Once he had bought the story rights, John normally packaged the screenplay with internationally recognized stars and an established director.

Dry Rot featured the actress Heather Sears, who was put under contract to Romulus. The studio created a vehicle for her, The Story of Esther Costello (1957) co-starring Joan Crawford.

Romulus financed three movies for producer Peter Rogers: After the Ball (1957) a biopic of Vesta Tilley starring Harvey; Time Lock (1957) from an Arthur Hailey TV play; and The Vicious Circle (1957) a thriller with John Mills. Other projects included The Silent Enemy (1958), a biopic of Lionel Crabb starring Harvey, and The Whole Truth (1958) a thriller with Stewart Granger and Donna Reed.

In December 1957, Romulus announced a program worth $5.6 million the following year including The Night Comers (ultimately never made) and Room at the Top. John Woolf became interested in Room at the Top after seeing an interview conducted by Woodrow Wyatt with the novel's author John Braine on Panorama on 8 April 1957. He bought a copy of the book the next day, and quickly purchased the film rights. There were two strong roles for actors under contract to Romulus, Laurence Harvey and Heather Sears, and the job of directing was given to Jack Clayton. The movie was an enormous critical and commercial success, Romulus' biggest since The African Queen; it established Harvey as a bona fide film star and Jack Clayton as a key director.

By the end of 1959, the company celebrated its tenth anniversary. It estimated it had invested $18 million in films, and had borrowed (and returned) $2.1 million from the National Film Finance Corporation (NFFC). Romulus claimed it had earned $8.5 million in foreign currency and that its films had played for 40,000 weeks in British cinemas and won more than 20 international awards.

Individually, John was instrumental in the formation of Anglia Television in 1958 and James wrote novels. In 1958, John Woolf was briefly on the board of British Lion but he resigned in a few months.

=== Clash with FIDO ===
In the early 1960s, the Woolf brothers and Daniel Angel ran into trouble from the film distributors' Defence Organisation owing to their refusal to withhold the rights to their old cinema films from the sale to television. There was some talk that their new films would be boycotted by British cinemas, but that did not happen.

=== Death of James Woolf ===
During the early 1960s, the brothers worked increasingly separately. James Woolf produced Term of Trial (1962) for director Peter Glenville, which introduced Sarah Miles. He developed The L-Shaped Room (1963) for Jack Clayton but ended up making it with Bryan Forbes. Romulus invested in two popular Peter Sellers comedies, The Wrong Arm of the Law (1963) and Heavens Above! (1963). James Woolf also produced The Pumpkin Eater (1964) with Anne Bancroft and Peter Finch for director Jack Clayon.

Forbes and James Woolf reunited on Of Human Bondage (1964), starring Kim Novak and Laurence Harvey; Forbes briefly took over directing after Henry Hathaway quit. During the making of Of Human Bondage, James went to hospital after an overdose of barbiturates that was possibly a suicide attempt. James Woolf then went to Hollywood to produce King Rat (1965), directed by Forbes. Back in England he made Life at the Top (1965) a sequel to Room at the Top, with Harvey reprising his role.

In 1964, John Woolf was part of a short lived attempt to take over British Lion.

In May 1966, James Woolf was staying at the Beverly Hills Hotel when he failed to keep a dinner arrangement with director Lewis Gilbert about making a film version of the musical Oliver!. A hotel employee found him dead, sitting up in bed with an open book on his lap; the cause was reported to be a heart attack. He was 46 years old. Bryan Forbes later claimed the heart attack was brought on by an accidental overdose of painkillers.

Gilbert had to pull out of the Oliver! project shortly before filming began because of his Paramount contract. John Woolf remembered The Fallen Idol (1948), which suggested to him that its director, Sir Carol Reed, had the requisite skills to work with children.

== John Woolf ==
John continued his career as a producer. In 1968, he bought British and American Film Holdings from Minster Trust. That year he produced his first film on his own, Oliver!, which film ended up winning the Oscar for Best Picture.

Woolf bought the screen rights to the Frederick Forsyth novel The Day of the Jackal which was turned into a popular movie. Another Forsyth adaptation, The Odessa File, was not as popular and Romulus ceased making movies.

John Woolf was knighted in 1975 and remained a director of Anglia Television until 1983. While there he produced episodes of Tales of the Unexpected.

In 1982, he joined Bernard Delfont and Max Rayne to form First Leisure Corporation, of which he was a director. He was also a trustee of the Cinema and Television Benevolent Fund. John Woolf retired in 1988.

== Personal lives ==
James was gay and was rumoured to be a lover of Laurence Harvey.

John Woolf was married three times. His first wife (m 1937) was Dorothy Vernon. His second wife was the actress Edana Romney. His third wife, Ann, was the daughter of director Victor Saville. She survived him. In 1999, the year of his death, John Woolf was estimated to be worth £40 million, through a combination of his films and shrewd investments.

In the late 1940s the brothers' uncle, Maurice Woolf, left £130,000 to a showgirl, Prudence Wise. John Woolf challenged the will and settled out of court.

== Romulus revival ==
Sir John Woolf's son, Jonathan Woolf, revived Romulus Films as of 1999, producing the film Revelation (2001).

In 2013, Romulus Films, Ltd. changed directions from film production to regenerative medicine, being involved in a $5 million stock and warrant purchase funding arrangement with BioTime Inc.

In April 2021, Romulus signed a worldwide distribution deal with StudioCanal (which was owned by Vivendi's Canal+ Group from 2021 to 2024 and is owned by Canal+ from 2024 onwards).

== Appraisal ==
In 1971, film critic Alexander Walker wrote about James Woolf:

[He] was a rarity in British films at the time, and would still be so if he was alive today: a man of taste and judgement who loved craftsmanship and supported a director instead of suffocating him or using him as a surrogate talent for the film he himself would have liked to direct had he dared... He was an obsessional filmmaker, loving the wheeling and dealing, relishing the juggling with human talents that it involved, and taking pleasure in spotting youthful proteges and promoting their careers, thereby gaining a vicarious satisfaction from their success that was lacking in his own basically lonely nature.

Filmmaker Bryan Forbes concurred:

He was a midwife for talent and smacked many of us into life... He had a quick mind that panned and found the nuggets before other prospectors on the trail had even arrived at the mine... Jimmy was a shield, quite fearless when tackling the front offices. He knew everybody and he was rich enough in his own right not to have to depend on the largesse of others when it came to getting a project off the ground. He had taste: taste in actors, taste in subject matter... There was a sadness about him at times because he had demons to fight, and in the end he died alone.

Pauline Stone wrote "It was Jimmy Woolf more than any other single person who gave Larry his sense of style, who sharpened Larry's instinctive recreation of a vanished elegance. At a time when other young actors were wearing jeans and t-shirts and riding about town on motor cycles, Jimmy taught Larry how to appreciate vintage wines and fine cigars, taught him the importance of good clothes and the joys of elegant motor cars."

According to Stone, when James Woolf died, Harvey said "In his company, I was electrified and enkindled and driven. I shall feel utterly miserable and alone without him. No woman will ever fill that void, no woman will ever be able to give me the love that Jimmy gave to me. It was unselfish and real and utterly without strings. It completely transcended sex, and what woman is able to compete with that?’"

Sue Harper and Vince Porter wrote:

John Woolf's success was based on an awareness that financial prosperity depended heavily on having the right distribution strategy, a readiness to take calculated risks in an era when public taste was changing fast, and an ability to produce subjects that he judged would be successful in both the British and the American markets. However, his readiness to indulge the creative whims of his brother James, including that of allowing James to cast Lawrence Harvey in many of their films, sometimes clouded his artistic and financial judgement.

Filmink magazine argued:

The Woolf Brothers' output was incredible. They made a handful of classic films (African Queen, Moulin Rouge, Room at the Tip, Oliver!, Day of the Jackal), a bunch of cult favourites (Beat the Devil, I am a Camera), a large proportion of box office winners and very few out and out flops. They were key to the development of new talent like Jack Clayton, Bryan Forbes, Laurence Harvey, Lewis Gilbert (who made some of his early films for the brothers), Joan Collins and producer Peter Rogers. They also pushed a lot of censorship-busting sex content (Room at the Top, L Shaped Room, I am a Camera), and gave some stars their most iconic roles (Bogie and Hepburn in The African Queen, Ava Gardner in Pandora, Jose Ferrer in Moulin Rouge, Stanley Baker in The Good Die Young, Laurence Harvey in Room at the Top.)

== In popular culture ==
In 2022, John Woolf was portrayed by Reece Shearsmith in the British-American film See How They Run.

== Selected filmography ==
- I'll Get You for This (1951)
- Pandora and the Flying Dutchman (1951)
- Galloping Major (1951)
- The African Queen (1951)
- The Late Edwina Black (1952)
- Treasure Hunt (1952)
- Women of Twilight (1952)
- Moulin Rouge (1952)
- Cosh Boy (1953)
- Innocents in Paris (1953)
- Beat the Devil (1953)
- The Good Die Young (1954)
- Carrington V.C. (1955)
- I Am a Camera (1955)
- Richard III (1955)
- Storm Over the Nile (1955)
- Sailor Beware (1956)
- Dry Rot (1956)
- The Bespoke Overcoat (1956) – short
- The Iron Petticoat (1956)
- Three Men in a Boat (1956)
- After the Ball (1957)
- The Story of Esther Costello (1957)
- Time Lock (1957)
- The Vicious Circle (1957)
- The Silent Enemy (1958)
- The Whole Truth (1958)
- Room at the Top (1959)
- Term of Trial (1962)
- The L-Shaped Room (1962)
- The Wrong Arm of the Law (1963)
- Heavens Above! (1963)
- The Pumpkin Eater (1964)
- Of Human Bondage (1964)
- King Rat (1965)
- Life at the Top (1965)

=== John Woolf only ===
- Oliver! (1968) – producer
- The Day of the Jackal (1973) – producer
- No Sex Please: We're British (1973) – executive producer
- The Odessa File (1974) – producer
- Orson Welles' Great Mysteries (1974–77) (TV series) – executive producer
- Alternative 3 (1977) (TV movie) – executive producer
- Joe and Mary (1977) (TV movie) – executive producer
- Roald Dahl's Tales of the Unexpected (1977–89) (TV series) – executive producer
- Atom Spies (1979) (TV movie) – executive producer
- Miss Morison's Ghosts (1981) (TV movie) – executive producer
- The Kingfisher (1983) (TV movie) – executive producer

=== Independent Film Distributors ===
- Shadow of the Eagle (1950)
- She Shall Have Murder (1950)
