= Women of Twilight =

1951 British play

Women of Twilight is a 1951 play by Sylvia Rayman that became a 1952 film directed by Gordon Parry.

== Plot ==
"The scene throughout is a semi-basement living room in a house near London, a grim and sordid place inhabited for sleeping and eating by a motley group of unmarried young women with babies - already born or about to be hustled into an unfriendly world. The 'proprietress' - a sadistic, unscrupulous woman called Helen Allistair - though a qualified nurse, exploits these unfortunate outcasts from society until one of them - the despairing girl Vivianne, whose gangster lover is hanged and who has nothing to lose - discovers this ghoulish creature's baby-farming activities. Vivianne, whose baby is shortly to be born, faces Mrs Allistair with her accusation, is brutally assaulted and almost loses her life. In the end justice is done, and Mrs Allistair gets her just desserts."

== Play ==
Women of Twilight was the first play written by Sylvia Rayman (1923–86).

According to the play's Broadway programme, "Sylvia Rayman's address, before she arrived in London, was Chorlton-cum-Hardy, Manchester. After she finished her schooling she worked in a factory and library and then went to London to become a writer. She supported herself as an usher, a nurse girl and a clerk in a ticket agency." By 1951, when Women of Twilight was picked up for production, she was working as a part-time waitress at a cafeteria on north London's Finchley Road.

Presented by Jean Shepeard and Evelyn Dysart at the Regent Theatre, Hayes on 30 July, Rayman's debut was advertised as 'an all-women play' and directed by Rona Laurie. Among material ordered cut by the Lord Chamberlain's office was dialogue relating to one character having been raped, plus the use of the Girl Guide motto "Be prepared" with an obvious sexual innuendo. The published text contains an introduction by Laurie ("This is a strong, forceful play calling for great sincerity both in production and acting"), plus the following note: "Sylvia Rayman gratefully acknowledges Miss Jean Shepeard's work in adapting the script for stage presentation, for finding its present title, and for first presenting it." The cast on this occasion included future playwright Ann Jellicoe.

A different production, directed by Anthony Hawtrey, was mounted at the Embassy Theatre in Swiss Cottage on 15 October. According to Oscar Lewenstein (later co-founder of the English Stage Company), "Jean [Shepeard] was reluctant to let us have the rights, but eventually I was able to make a deal with her. Tony was enthusiastic and got a strong cast, all women, most of whom had worked at the Embassy before." Having been taken up by impresario Jack Hylton, Hawtrey's production transferred to the Vaudeville Theatre in the West End on 7 November. Billed as 'London's most daring play', it was variously described by reviewers as "a disturbing but undeniably strong all-women drama", "a painful, compelling, horrific and dramatically gripping piece" and "a strong, lurid melodrama not for the squeamish". The production closed on 19 April 1952 after 186 performances.

After a two-month break (during which the show went on tour and the film version was made), Hawtrey's production was revived at the Victoria Palace on 18 June, playing twice-nightly until 1 November and achieving another 235 performances. For this run, Freda Jackson, star of the yet to be released film, was added to the cast. Noted The Stage newspaper, "Jack Hylton feels this play has a vast potential audience who will welcome the cheaper seats obtainable at the Victoria Palace. There is no question of the play, which deals with the social problem of the unmarried mother, being sensationalised by its transference to a twice-nightly theatre."

By this time, Hylton and Hawtrey had already taken the play on an ill-fated excursion to New York, where it opened at the Plymouth Theatre on 3 March, was deemed "repulsive" by local critics and closed on 8 March after only eight performances. This production marked the only Broadway appearance for such British actresses as Betty Ann Davies, Miriam Karlin, Gwen Watford and June Whitfield.

In the UK, the play began a long life on tour even while the Vaudeville production was still running. It was also popular at regional repertory theatres. Freda Jackson, for example, spent much of 1954 guest-starring in the play at various reps, notably Windsor, Richmond and Northampton. Then in 1955, director Rona Laurie and producer Jean Shepeard reclaimed the property for a tour of provincial music halls; Shepeard also acted in this version.

Sylvia Rayman, meanwhile, had two further plays produced, both of them thrillers - Time to Speak and Justice in Heaven, first staged in April 1957 and March 1958 respectively. Neither repeated the success of Women of Twilight.

The first notable revival of Women of Twilight was directed by Jonathan Rigby and opened at London's White Bear Theatre on 3 October 2013 as part of its Lost Classics Project. The production was itself revived, at the same venue, on 6 January 2014 and again, this time at Pleasance Islington, from 14 April.

=== Theatre reviews ===
The Stage, October 1951: "It is seldom that a play comes along that can grip like this one does. Perhaps it is just as well. The plight of dramatic critics whose emotions were weekly wrung with this sort of thing would be sad indeed. For here is a direct and sincere composition that, without possessing much artistic merit or beauty of line, tells, nevertheless, a story that grips the imagination from the outset and will not let it go. It does not demand much prescience to predict that it will duly gain a larger audience than it will see at Swiss Cottage ... Miss Rayman has etched a clear-cut and disturbing play in which the characters are extraordinarily well defined and endowed with a credibility that carries them unscathed through situations that verge at times perilously close to the melodramatic."

The Observer, October 1951: "No one would put this among the Plays Pleasant, but it does seize the mind."

The Spectator, October 1951: "Miss Rayman has written her first play around a revolting character who makes a comfortable income by taking unmarried mothers and their infants into her Hampstead home ... Virtue triumphs on the Embassy stage but it does not always triumph outside the theatre, and one is left wondering just what does happen to such girls who have neither friends nor relatives to turn to and who escape the welfare of the State for some reason. The piece is very well acted by Barbara Couper, Vida Hope, Rene Ray and the rest of a company entirely of women."

Daily Telegraph, October 1951: "Unrelieved femininity is popularly supposed to breed neurosis, and certainly this is the most hysterical play I have met for many years."

The Stage, November 1951: "The play well deserves its quick transfer to the West End ... Sylvia Rayman, whose first play this is and whose previous career has run on non-theatrical lines, piles on the agony more than somewhat. This is indeed a remarkable drama to come from an inexperienced pen; it would be praised if offered by an established dramatist ... Barbara Couper, as the baby-farmer and operator of the home, could not send a bigger thrill down our spines if she were appearing in the most horrible of avowed Grand Guignol sketches; and Rene Ray really moves us as poor Vivianne. But the whole company is first-class."

Theatre World, January 1952: "This was a first play of highly melodramatic and even Grand Guignol proportions. But the characterisation was entirely convincing, so that, thanks to an exceedingly clever all-woman cast, one quickly lost one's sense that the story was over-coloured ... Improbable though it may seem, there is a considerable amount of humour in the play, thanks to the author's undoubted gift for character drawing, and Anthony Hawtrey's production made the most of every opportunity for light and shade. Mary Purvis's setting was painfully squalid in every detail."

The Stage, June 1952: "Twice-nightly performance at a theatre so long associated with the antics of the Crazy Gang is hardly the ideal environment for a bold play about unmarried mothers ... One fears not so much for the play, which, leaving aside the worth of its subject, is no more than a tolerably good one; but rather for the subject itself, which is liable to be taken in the wrong spirit by the prude and prurient ... Anthony Hawtrey's production has made the transfer from the Vaudeville without any obvious hitches ... As the landlady, Freda Jackson conveys an admirably restrained sense of power in the earlier episodes, which she later develops into an impressive climax of malignant passion."

== Cast - Hayes premiere 1951 ==
- Helen Allistair - Beatrix Mackey
- Christine - Delphine Muir
- Jess - Ana Glyn
- Rosie - Ann Purkiss
- Laura - Ann Jellicoe
- Vivianne - Shelley Lynn
- Veronica - Maureen Hurley
- Olga - Olga Lowe
- Sal - Lynda King
- Molly - Mary Newlands
- nurse - Evelyn Dysart

== Cast - Embassy and Vaudeville Theatres 1951/52 ==
- Helen Allistair - Barbara Couper
- Christine - Joslin Parlane
- Jess - Vida Hope [later: Phyllis Montefiore]
- Rosie - Maria Charles
- Laura - Gwynne Whitby [later: Mavis Walker]
- Vivianne - Rene Ray
- Veronica - Maureen Hurley [Embassy], Maureen Glynne [Vaudeville]
- Olga - Miriam Karlin [later: Diana King]
- Sal - Lynda King [later: Pamela Cameron]
- Molly - Jacqueline Seager
- nurse - Betty Henderson

== Cast - Broadway: Plymouth Theatre 1952 ==
- Helen Allistair - Mary Merrall
- Christine - Gwen Watford
- Jess - Lorraine Clewes
- Rosie - June Whitfield
- Laura - Gwynne Whitby
- Vivianne - Betty Ann Davies
- Veronica - Mary Matthews
- Olga - Miriam Karlin
- Sal - Lynda Lee [aka Lynda King]
- Molly - Joan Forrest
- nurse - Marjory Hawtrey

== Cast - Victoria Palace Theatre 1952 ==
- Helen Allistair - Freda Jackson
- Christine - Joslin Parlane
- Jess - Lorraine Clewes
- Rosie - Maria Charles
- Laura - Gwynne Whitby
- Vivianne - Rene Ray [later: Christine Adrian]
- Veronica - Maureen Glynne
- Olga - Miriam Karlin
- Sal - Lynda King
- Molly - Patricia Lett
- nurse - Betty Henderson

== Cast - White Bear and Pleasance Theatres 2013/14 ==
- Helen Allistair - Sally Mortemore
- Christine - Elizabeth Donnelly
- Jess - Vanessa Russell
- Rosie - Ailsa Ilott
- Laura - Emma Spearing
- Vivianne - Claire Louise Amias
- Veronica - Amy Comper
- Olga - Francesca Anderson
- Sal - Emma Reade-Davies
- Molly - Christie Banks
- nurse - Maggie Robson [White Bear], Virge Gilchrist [Pleasance]

== Filmed versions ==
In 1952, the play was turned into a film directed by Gordon Parry starring Freda Jackson, Rene Ray and Lois Maxwell, with a screenplay by Anatole de Grunwald. It was the first British film to receive the recently introduced X certificate.

Another screen version of Rayman's play, Mulheres do crepúsculo, was broadcast as part of the Brazilian TV series Grande Teatro Tupi on 13 January 1963.
