= Tiara Tahiti =

1962 British film by Ted Kotcheff

- Belgian theatrical poster
- Directed by: Ted Kotcheff
- Written by: Geoffrey Cotterell; Ivan Foxwell
- Based on: novel by Geoffrey Cotterell
- Produced by: Ivan Foxwell
- Starring: James Mason; John Mills; Claude Dauphin; Herbert Lom; Rosenda Monteros
- Cinematography: Otto Heller
- Edited by: Antony Gibbs
- Music by: Philip Green
- Production companies: Rank Organisation Film Productions; Ivan Foxwell Productions
- Distributed by: Rank Organisation (UK); Zenith (USA)
- Release date: July 1962 (UK)
- Running time: 100 minutes
- Country: United Kingdom
- Language: English
- Budget: £500,000

Tiara Tahiti is a 1962 British comedy-drama film directed by Ted Kotcheff and starring James Mason and John Mills. Kotcheff's directorial debut, it is based on the novel by Geoffrey Cotterell, who also adapted it for the screen with Ivan Foxwell.

== Plot ==
Clifford Southey is a clerk at a brokerage firm who is promoted to lieutenant colonel during the war. His subordinate officer, Captain Brett Aimsley, was a partner at Southey's firm. Popular and charismatic, Capt. Aimsley is everything Col. Southey is not, but aspires to be. Unfortunately money is Aimsley's weakness. His profligacy sees him removed from Southey's command.

Some time after the war, Aimsley's comfortable exile in Tahiti is rudely interrupted by the arrival of his old adversary, now director of a hotel chain looking to expand into the burgeoning South Seas market.

== Cast ==
- James Mason as Aimsley
- John Mills as Southey
- Herbert Lom as Chong Sing
- Rosenda Monteros as Belle Annie
- Claude Dauphin as Henry
- Roy Kinnear as Enderby
- Madge Ryan as Millie Brooks

== Production ==
It was filmed in London and Tahiti. It started in Tahiti 14 August 1961 and 9 September in Pinewood. Filming had been postponed due to a union dispute over overtime.

Ivan Foxwell called the movie "a half-million pound escape from the kitchen sink. Tahiti that kind of magic which conjures up in most people's minds a paradise isle of golden beaches, blue lagoons and brownskinned beauties. It is a setting that in colour lends itself admirably to the cinema screen, and on a cold, foggy winter's night it spells one word—escapism." It was the first feature from Ted Kotcheff. Foxwell said "“His quality lies in his flair for getting the best out of actors. I chose him because it is a story of characters, and its success depends on really good performances by the artists.”

Mills called James Mason a "very shy and complex man with enormous charm. And, of course, one of the best film actors ever. I remember one evening we were at a dinner together, given by Ivan Foxwell, on the beach. Very romantic setting. After a dinner I sang a song I'd written, accompanying myself on the ukelele. When I finished, I was surprised to see Jimmy had tears rolling. For all his success I think he had quite a difficult life."

James Mason called the film "less good than A Touch of Larceny", an earlier movie he had made with Ivan Foxwell, but called it "a rare adventure for all concerned."

Ted Kotcheff later said "that film is best forgotten! It could have been a really interesting comedy. It was an Evelyn Waugh-style satire on class.... This playing out of class attitudes is enacted in this ridiculous, totally inappropriate setting of Tahiti. It could have been funny, but unfortunately I was too inexperienced. I was too young, still in my twenties. I bungled it."

== Reception ==
The film was originally condemned by the Legion of Decency in the USA but was later reclassified with a B rating.

=== Box office ===
In July 1962 Kinematograph Weekly reported the movie has "caught on like wildfire because it has point, popular leading players and, above all, transplants its audience to a sunny climate. And how its title sparkles with exciting possibilities!"

According to Kinematograph Weekly the film was considered a "money maker" at the British box office in 1962.

Filmink argued the movie's success in Britain was "based one assumes on the popularity of its stars and the Tahitian locations. We’re not sure that the film “travelled” that well – other countries aren’t as interested in comedies about the class system as Britain, certainly not America – and it may not have recouped its budget of half a million pounds, but who knows? It’s a bit of a “whatever” movie."

=== Critical reception ===
Variety said it had "polish".

Monthly Film Bulletin said "With a TV reputation for slick, hard-hitting and technically adventurous productions behind him, it might have been expected that William Kotcheff would have brought some of these qualities to his first commercial feature. Unhappily, the film bears all the hallmarks of the standard Rank production; if there was any freshness of approach in Kotcheff's original conception, it has now been successfully ironed away. Essentially an actor's vehicle (resembling, at times, a South Sea island version of Tunes of Glory [1960]), the story needs much firmer and subtler handling than it receives here; veering uneasily between military satire and character drama, it scarcely convinces on either level. But it has two meaty parts and James Mason, with his practised charm and irony, brings just the right weight to his role. John Mills, on the other hand, is encouraged to over-act and, surely, it was a mistake to give him two lengthy face-to-camera monologues, especially when the situations are so overblown. After the protracted opening sequences, the Tahitian locations seem like a breath of fresh air yet, even here, neither camerawork, colour nor direction make much of the material."

In The New York Times, Bosley Crowther called it "lush, foolish, sometimes funny ... splotchy entertainment that is, at least, colorful".

Variety wrote "The two male stars in this pic have a field day. Mason is fine as the mocking wastrel while Mills is equally good in a more difficult role that could have lapsed into parody. These two carry the main burden of the film."

The Radio Times Guide to Films gave the film 2/5 stars, writing: "Director Ted Kotcheff's feature debut is an adequate showcase for the talents of James Mason and John Mills. Nobody can smarm like Mason and he breezes through the picture, as a cultured crook who sees Mills's arrival on Tahiti to negotiate a hotel deal as the chance to pay him back for his being cashiered at the end of the war. Mills occasionally struggles to convince in the more difficult role, not always managing to keep the lid on his histrionics."

Time Out found it an "uneven mix of character study and situation comedy".

Leslie Halliwell said: "Uneasy mixture of light comedy and character drama; enjoyable in parts, but flabbily assembled and muddily photographed."
