= The Green Cockatoo =

1937 British film by William Cameron Menzies

- Theatrical release poster
- Directed by: William Cameron Menzies
- Written by: Ted Berkman
- Story by: Graham Greene
- Produced by: William K. Howard
- Starring: John Mills; Rène Ray
- Cinematography: Mutz Greenbaum
- Edited by: Russell Lloyd
- Music by: Miklós Rózsa
- Production company: Devonshire Films
- Distributed by: 20th Century Fox
- Release date: 1940 (UK)
- Running time: 65 minutes
- Country: United Kingdom
- Language: English

The Green Cockatoo (also known as Four Dark Hours and Race Gang) is a 1937 British drama film directed by William Cameron Menzies and starring John Mills, Rène Ray, and Robert Newton. It was adapted by Ted Barkman from a story by Graham Greene and shot at Denham Studios. It tells the story of an innocent young woman who arrives in London looking for work and, pursued by both criminals and police, is involved in a headlong series of fights and flights.

== Plot ==
An innocent young woman arrives in London looking for work and walks into an ambush, in which gangsters knife an accomplice who has cheated them. The wounded man staggers with her to a cheap hotel, where he dies after begging her to tell his brother at The Green Cockatoo club. Going there, she is followed by police and hides in an upstairs room. It is that of Jim, the brother, but he does not identify himself to the stranger. When the police leave he escorts her out, but is followed by the gangsters. In another knife fight he gets away and takes her to a safe house. The police turn up, this time to take him to the morgue to identify his brother. When they leave, the gangsters abduct the girl. Looking for the gangsters, Jim turns up and in another fight immobilises them. The police arrive to arrest the gangsters, while Jim and the girl head for the country.

== Cast ==
- John Mills as Jim Connor
- Rène Ray as Eileen
- Robert Newton as Dave Connor
- Charles Oliver as Terrell, gang boss
- Bruce Seton as Madison, tall henchman
- Julian Vedey as Steve, short henchman
- Allan Jeayes as the Detective Inspector
- Frank Atkinson as Protheroe

== Production ==
According to the British Film Institute the film was made c.1937 but not released until 1940 after some re-shooting and re-editing. The opening music is "In Town Tonight", by Eric Coates.

== Critical reception ==
The Monthly Film Bulletin wrote: "The acting is much more convincing than the plot, René Ray maintaining a bewildered charming innocence throughout and John Mills being pleasantly tough as the owner of a cheap Soho café."

Variety wrote: "It's an obvious imitation of the gangster-type pictures produced by Hollywood during the last decade. As with all imitations made by those without the proper know-how, however, film, made before the war, emerges as more of a travesty than a carbon copy. Picture had the proper foundation in a story by Graham Greene, but whole thing collapses in a caricature of pseudo-thugs walking around with their hatbrims pulled down over their eyes, their hands continually in their pockets, etc. Film's chief saving grace is the acting. John Mills does the best he can in a James Cagney-type role, even with the songs and dances, American gangster slang, though, Just doesn't sound right coming from him. Robert Newton is good as Mills' no-account brother, around whom all the action revolves. Rene Ray is beauteous and has the right wide-eyed stare as the young country lass who unintentionally gets mixed up with all the big, bad gangsters in her first trip to London."

In British Sound Films: The Studio Years 1928–1959 David Quinlan rated the film as "average", writing: "Completed as Four Dark Hours in 1937, and shown as such in America, though not released in Britain until 1939 as The Green Cockatoo. The delay is puzzling as it's a tough little thriller that provides its star (John Mills) with a James Cagney-style role."

The Radio Times Guide to Films gave the film 1/5 stars, writing: "Sometimes even the greatest of talents don't add up to a successful movie. In this case the original story was by Graham Greene, the director was the great production designer William Cameron Menzies and the film was produced by noted director William K Howard. John Mills is miscast as a singer who sets out to avenge the murder of his brother (Robert Newton). This contrived and episodic imitation of a Hollywood gangster melodrama is set during one dark night in Soho."
