= The Good Die Young =

1954 British film by Lewis Gilbert

- US 1955 cinema poster
- Directed by: Lewis Gilbert
- Screenplay by: Vernon Harris; Lewis Gilbert
- Based on: The Good Die Young by Richard Macaulay
- Produced by: John Woolf; Jack Clayton
- Starring: Laurence Harvey; Gloria Grahame; Richard Basehart; Joan Collins; John Ireland; Rene Ray; Stanley Baker; Margaret Leighton
- Cinematography: Jack Asher
- Edited by: Ralph Kemplen
- Music by: Georges Auric
- Production company: Remus Films
- Distributed by: Independent Film Distributors (UK); United Artists (US)
- Release dates: 2 March 1954 (UK); 29 November 1955 (US)
- Running time: 100 minutes
- Country: United Kingdom
- Language: English

The Good Die Young is a 1954 British crime film directed by Lewis Gilbert and starring Laurence Harvey, Gloria Grahame, Joan Collins, Stanley Baker, Richard Basehart and John Ireland. It was made by Remus Films from a screenplay by Vernon Harris and Gilbert based on the 1953 novel of the same name by Richard Macaulay. It tells the story of four men in London with no criminal past whose marriages and finances are collapsing and, meeting in a pub, are tempted to redeem their situations by a robbery.

== Plot ==
Mike is an injured ex-boxer unable to find a job and penniless after his wife Angela, who he loves, gives their life savings to her criminal brother. Joe has been fired from his clerical job in the USA to reclaim Mary, his pregnant English wife, who feels unable to escape her clinging and unstable mother. Eddie deserts the US Air Force in an effort to regain Denise, his unfaithful actress wife. The fourth man is Rave, decorated in the war but now a womaniser and gambler sponging off his rich wife Eve, who wants to take him away to Kenya.

Rave has started an affair with a girl who works in a post office that handles consignments of used banknotes. He cajoles the other three into a night raid, supplying revolvers for show. In fact, to the horror of the others, he opens fire on approaching police and, when Mike tries to surrender, shoots him down as well. The three survivors make off with £100,000, sharing some and hiding the rest in a tomb in a churchyard. When Joe is not looking, Rave then kills Eddie but Joe outwits him and escapes.

Collecting his wife Mary, he rushes to the airport for a flight to the USA. Also there, waiting for Rave, is his wife Eve who has booked them a flight to Nairobi. Joe sees Rave arrive and shoots him, but as he falls he shoots Joe. All four men have died, leaving nobody who knows where the money is hidden.

== Cast ==
- Laurence Harvey as Miles 'Rave' Ravenscourt
- Margaret Leighton as Eve Ravenscourt
- Stanley Baker as Mike Morgan
- Rene Ray as Angela Morgan
- John Ireland as Eddie Blaine
- Gloria Grahame as Denise Blaine
- Richard Basehart as Joe Halsey
- Joan Collins as Mary Halsey
- Robert Morley as Sir Francis Ravenscourt, Rave's father
- Freda Jackson as Mrs Freeman, Mary's mother
- James Kenney as Dave, Angela's brother
- Susan Shaw as Doris, girl in the pub
- Lee Patterson as Tod Maslin
- Sandra Dorne as pretty girl
- Leslie Dwyer as Stookey
- Patricia McCarron as Carole
- George Rose as Bunny
- Joan Heal as woman
- Walter Hudd as Dr Reed
- Harold Siddons as hospital doctor
- Marianne Stone as Molly, the barmaid
- Edward Judd as Ron Simpson
- MacDonald Parke as Mr. Carruthers
- Patricia Owens as Winnie

== Production ==
The film was presented by the Woolf Brothers' Romulus company, who made British films targeted at international audiences. This meant they used American stars. Gilbert says that James Woolf found the book and gave it to him, but that Woolf insisted Laurence Harvey be cast. The film was an early lead role for Stanley Baker.

Filming started on 28 September 1953. Jack Clayton was credited as the associate producer of this Remus production.

The novel's original setting was Beverly Hills but for the film this was changed to London. Shooting was on location in London and at Shepperton Studios, with other scenes of Pan Am Boeing Stratocruiser aircraft at Heathrow Airport and the London Underground District Line around Barbican. The sets were designed by the art director Bernard Robinson.

The British bank financing the film required that the novel's bank robbery be switched to a post office in the film. Gilbert claimed in one interview that the characters were not allowed to use guns due to the censor; however, although the majority of Gilbert's memories of the film being "watered down" for the finished screenplay are correct, this memory was incorrect. Guns were ultimately used in the heist and subsequent scenes.

Laurence Harvey subsequently married Margaret Leighton, who played his wife in the film. Kirk Douglas visited Gloria Grahame and John Ireland on the set and appeared in the film as an extra as a joke.

== Release ==
The film opened in the United Kingdom on 2 March 1954, with general release following on 5 April. The following year it was released in America by United Artists and France by Cinédis.

Gilbert says the film "did quite well" and "had quite a run in America" because of the cast. James Woolf estimated Romulus made around $100,000 from the US run.

== Critical reception ==
In contemporary reviews,The Monthly Film Bulletin wrote: "Director Lewis Gilbert again displays a flair for kaleidoscopic presentation and crowns the poignant and gripping portrait of London life with hair-raising street gun fighting and electric railway track thrills. Tender and violent in turns, it'll rivet the masses to their seats." Kine Weekly said "High-voltage romantic crime melodrama, inspired by a recent sensational mail robbery. ... A prodigious, star-packed Anglo-American cast meets all acting demands, and the direction is both forthright and imaginative." Variety said: "There is a major lineup of talent in this independently-made British pic, but fulfillment does not quite come up to expectations. Although there is basically a tense dramatic theme, the scrappy treatment, necessitated by the omnibus type of story, robs the film of some of its suspense and values."

In British Sound Films: The Studio Years 1928–1959 David Quinlan rated the film as "average", writing: "Dark, gloomy thriller."

Leslie Halliwell said: "Glum all-star melodrama which set a pattern for such things; worth waiting for is the climactic chase through underground stations." Filmink argued "the heist was introduced too late."

The Radio Times Guide to Films gave the film 3/5 stars, calling it a "well-crafted British heist thriller, atmospherically directed by Lewis Gilbert."
