= Mountains O'Mourne =

1938 film

- Directed by: Harry Hughes
- Written by: Gerald Brosnan; Daisy L. Fielding
- Produced by: Harry Hughes
- Starring: Rene Ray; Niall MacGinnis; Jerry Verno
- Cinematography: Geoffrey Faithfull
- Edited by: Cecil H. Williamson
- Music by: Percival Mackey
- Production companies: Rembrandt Film Productions; Butcher's Film Service
- Distributed by: Butcher's Film Service
- Release date: 1938
- Running time: 95 minutes
- Country: United Kingdom
- Language: English
- Budget: £10,108

Mountains O'Mourne is a 1938 British musical film directed by Harry Hughes and starring Rene Ray, Niall MacGinnis and Jerry Verno. The title is a reference to the song The Mountains of Mourne, a common theme from films produced by Butcher's Film Service.

== Plot summary ==
Two Irish families are evicted from their properties, but their children raise the money to regain them.

== Partial Cast ==
- Rene Ray as Mary Macree
- Niall MacGinnis as Paddy Kelly
- Jerry Verno as Dip Evans
- Betty Ann Davies as Violet Mayfair
- Charles Oliver as Errol Finnegan
- Hamilton Keene as O'Rourke
- Kaye Seeley as Peter O'Loughlin
- Maire O'Neill as Maura Macree
- Eve Lynd as Nikita Findley
- Freda Jackson as Biddy O'Hara
- Alexander Butler as Tim Kelly

== Production ==
It was shot at Walton Studios near London. The film's sets were designed by the art director R. Holmes Paul.

== Reception ==
The Monthly Film Bulletin wrote: "The direction is good and the camera is often used to see through the eyes of the characters as well as viewing the action from outside them. The hard-hearted landlord and his caddish nephew are drawn in melodramatic vein but not so unduly as to be alien to the romantic story and its coincidences such as Dip finding the will. The acting and singing of Niall MacGinnis are good and he is well supported by the rest of the cast."

Kine Weekly wrote: "Niall MacGinnis, as Paddy, looks like a good bet for British films. He brings to the role an appealingly rugged charm as well as fine sense of sincerity and conviction. ... Rene Ray is also wistfully eflective in a Janet Gaynor-ish part as Mary and contributes valuable support in the vocal department. Jerry Verno supplies comedy relief as a pickpocket-turned-valet, and Betty Ann Davies is a decorative and convincing vamp. ... Narration is simple and straightforward, with both issues and characters clear cut and easily understandable."
