= Where There's a Will (1955 film) =

1955 British film by Vernon Sewell

- George Cole and Dandy Nichols
- Directed by: Vernon Sewell
- Written by: R. F. Delderfield (play and screenplay)
- Produced by: George Maynard
- Starring: Kathleen Harrison; George Cole; Leslie Dwyer
- Cinematography: Basil Emmott
- Edited by: Peter Rolfe Johnson
- Music by: Robert Sharples
- Production company: George Maynard Productions
- Distributed by: Eros Films
- Release date: March 1955
- Running time: 80 minutes
- Country: United Kingdom
- Language: English

Where There's a Will is a 1955 British comedy film directed by Vernon Sewell and starring Kathleen Harrison, George Cole and Leslie Dwyer. The screenplay was by R. F. Delderfield who adapted one of his own plays.

A family from east London take over a farm in the Devon countryside.

== Plot ==
When their uncle dies without leaving a will, his farm passes to his nephew and two nieces, leaving nothing for his longtime housekeeper, Annie Yeo. While the nieces wish to sell the place, the nephew, Alfie Brewer, has ideas of setting up as a farmer. Facing the hostility of his family, and some of the locals, he attempts to improve the farm before its mortgage is called in.

== Cast ==
- Kathleen Harrison as Annie Yeo
- George Cole as Fred Slater (Alfie's brother-in-law)
- Leslie Dwyer as Alfie Brewer
- Ann Hanslip as June Hodge (Alfie's niece)
- Michael Shepley as Mr Cogent
- Dandy Nichols as Maud Hodge (Alfie's older sister)
- Thelma Ruby as Amy Slater (Alfie's younger sister)
- Norman MacOwan as Cagey
- Hugh Morton as Arscott
- Edward Lexy as Mafeking
- Edward Woodward as Ralph Stokes
- Philip Ray as Squire Stokes
- Sam Kydd as jeep driver
- Bill Shine as Porter

== Production ==
Sewell called it "a charming movie" which "made a lot of money'.

== Critical reception ==
The Monthly Film Bulletin wrote: "Where There's a Will has been adapted from a stage farce, and no attempt has been made to disguise the film's origins. Although the cast works energetically at a script which contains all the old town-and-country jokes, only George Cole manages to amuse occasionally with 'his performance as the brother-in-law."

Picturegoer wrote: "The comedy team works hard with the naive, broad-humoured plot about a Cockney family that inherits a derelict Devonshire farm. ... But these comedy experts cover up the many faults with amazing skill. Leslie Dwyer and Kathleen Harrison are oddly touching as the little people with a dream. George Cole repeats his wonderful Belles of St. Trinian's spiv – this time in white socks, 'platform' shoes and 'Teddy' togs."

Picture Show wrote: "Amusingly told and acted."

The Radio Times Guide to Films gave the film 2/5 stars, writing: "This sporadically charming fish-out-of-water comedy sees a family of cockneys moving to the Devon countryside when they inherit a run-down farm. Director Vernon Sewell manages a few sty touches, as local housekeeper Kathleen Harrison tries to whip the work-shy Londoners into shape. George Cole gives his rent-a-spiv character another airing, and there's a young Edward Woodward lurking among the bit players."

TV Guide called it a "harmless comedy with some charming touches."

Leslie Halliwell said: "Slight comedy with pleasant players."
