= Rene Ray, Countess of Midleton =

British actress and novelist (1911–1993)

The Right Honourable The Countess of Midleton
- Born: Irene Lilian Creese; 22 September 1911; London, England
- Died: 28 August 1993 (aged 81); Jersey, Channel Islands
- Occupation: Actress
- Spouses: George Posford; George Brodrick, 2nd Earl of Midleton (m. 1975; died 1979)

Irene Lilian Brodrick, Countess of Midleton (née Creese, known as Rene Ray, 22 September 1911 – 28 August 1993) was a British stage and screen actress of the 1930s, 1940s and 1950s and also a novelist.

== Acting career ==
Ray made her screen début in the 1929 silent film High Treason and first appeared on the West End stage on 5 December 1930 in the André Charlot production of Wonder Bar at the Savoy Theatre. In 1935 she starred with Conrad Veidt in the Gaumont British film The Passing of the Third Floor Back. Other film co-stars included George Arliss (His Lordship, 1936), John Mills (The Green Cockatoo, 1937), Gordon Harker (The Return of the Frog, 1938) and Trevor Howard (They Made Me a Fugitive, 1947).

At London's Lyric Theatre in 1936 she appeared with Laurence Olivier and Ralph Richardson in JB Priestley's short-lived play Bees on the Boat Deck. Other West End credits included Yes and No (1937), They Walk Alone (1939) and Other People's Houses (1941). Her single Broadway appearance was in Cedric Hardwicke's production of Priestley's An Inspector Calls, which ran at the Booth Theatre from October 1947 to January 1948. In 1951–52 she starred in the London production of Sylvia Rayman's Women of Twilight, playing the central role nearly 450 times and reprising her performance in the subsequent film version.

She made her last screen appearance as an interviewee in the BBC documentary Britain's Missing Movie Heritage, broadcast on 30 September 1992, 11 months before her death.

== Books ==
She turned to writing for much of her later career. Her first novel, Wraxton Marne, appeared in 1946. According to a 1953 magazine profile, "Her second book, Emma Conquest, was an immediate best-seller." (First published in 1950, this was reissued in 2010.) Other books included A Man Named Seraphin (1952) and The Tree Surgeon (1958). In 1956 she scripted the seven-part ATV science fiction serial The Strange World of Planet X; the following year her novelisation was published by Herbert Jenkins Ltd and a feature film based on it was made by Artistes Alliance. In the United States the film was renamed Cosmic Monsters.

== Personal life ==
Her father was Alfred Edward Creese, a famous British automotive and aviation inventor. Born as Irene, she signed her name with a grave accent on the first 'e', not an acute accent on the second (Rène not René); her method was followed on all theatre programmes, book jackets and other publicity material.

Her first husband was the composer George Posford. In the 1950s she met George St John Brodrick, 2nd Earl of Midleton (1888–1979); she moved with him to Jersey in 1963 and became his third wife in 1975, thus allowing her to style herself the Countess of Midleton. In retirement she became an accomplished amateur painter and a member of the Jersey Film Society, which in 1986 opened its 40th season with a screening of The Passing of the Third Floor Back. She died on 28 August 1993 in Jersey, the Channel Islands.

== Partial filmography ==
- High Treason (1929) - (uncredited)
- Varsity (1930) - Iris
- Young Woodley (1930) - Kitty
- Dance Pretty Lady (1931) - Elsie
- Tonight's the Night (1931) - Rose Smithers
- Keepers of Youth (1931) - Kitty Williams
- Two White Arms (1932) - Trixie
- When London Sleeps (1932) - Mary
- Here's George (1932) - Telephonist
- The King's Cup (1933) - Peggy
- Excess Baggage (1933) - Angela Murgatroyd
- Born Lucky (1933) - Mops
- Tiger Bay (1934) - Letty
- Rolling in Money (1934) - Eliza Dibbs
- Nine Forty-Five (1934) - Mary Doane
- Easy Money (1934) - Typist
- Once in a New Moon (1935) - Stella Drake
- Street Song (1935) - Lucy
- Regal Cavalcade (1935) - Girl
- Full Circle (1935) - Margery Boyd
- The Passing of the Third Floor Back (1935) - Stasia
- Beloved Imposter (1936) - Mary
- Secret Agent (1936) - Maid (uncredited)
- Crime Over London (1936) - Joan
- His Lordship (1936) - Vera
- Please Teacher (1937) - Ann Trent
- Farewell Again (1937) - Elsie Wainwright
- Jennifer Hale (1937) - Jennifer Hale
- The Rat (1937) - Odile Verdier
- The Green Cockatoo (1937) - Eileen
- Bank Holiday (1938) - Doreen
- Housemaster (1938) - Chris Faringdon
- Weddings Are Wonderful (1938) - Betty Leadbetter
- The Return of the Frog (1938) - Lela Oaks
- Mountains O'Mourne (1938) - Mary Macree
- Home from Home (1939) - Gladys Burton
- The Call for Arms (1940, Short) - Joan
- Old Bill and Son (1941) - Sally
- They Made Me a Fugitive (1947) - Cora
- If Winter Comes (1947) - Sarah 'Low Jinks'
- The Galloping Major (1951) - Pam Riley
- Women of Twilight (1952) - Vivianne
- The Good Die Young (1954) - Angela
- The Vicious Circle (1957) - Mrs. Ambler
