= The Dark Light (film) =

1951 British film by Vernon Sewell

- Directed by: Vernon Sewell
- Written by: Vernon Sewell
- Produced by: Michael Carreras; Anthony Hinds
- Starring: Albert Lieven; David Greene; Norman MacOwan
- Cinematography: Moray Grant
- Edited by: Francis Bieber
- Music by: Frank Spencer
- Production company: Hammer Films
- Distributed by: Exclusive Films (UK)
- Release date: 23 April 1951 (UK)
- Running time: 66 minutes
- Country: United Kingdom
- Language: English

The Dark Light is a 1951 British second feature thriller film directed and written by Vernon Sewell and starring Albert Lieven, David Greene and Norman MacOwan. Filming began on July 10, 1950, and ended on Aug. 19th. This was 23-year-old Michael Carreras' first assignment as a producer, and he brought the film in on time and within budget.

== Plot ==
The crew of a lighthouse, led by skipper Rigby and his assistants Johnny and Matt, rescue what they assume to be the survivors of a shipwreck, two men and a woman, Linda, Luigi and Mark, their leader. However, they turn out to be criminals on the run from a bank robbery. The criminals try to persuade the lighthouse employees to help them escape in another boat in exchange for part of the loot, but the skipper refuses to help, and destroys the boat's engine. Matt likes the idea of the money offered, but Johnny refuses to go along with it until Mark instructs Linda to persuade him. She manipulates Johnny by telling him he'll be rescuing her from a terrible danger by taking them to the mainland, and he finally agrees. He locks the skipper up with supplies for two days, telling him he'll send help as soon as they row ashore. The skipper is angry with him for his betrayal, but Johnny says if he knew the truth he'd help, but the skipper responds that he'll go to jail for this. Matt and Johnny load the others into the boat; Luigi says he's forgotten his jacket and goes back for it, but actually kills the skipper. They set off in the boat, but after some time rowing, Matt realises that the light isn't on and says that they must go back. Only then do Johnny and Matt find out that the skipper is dead, and a fight breaks out, ending in Mark and Matt going overboard. Johnny, finally understanding how he has been manipulated and lied to, decides to head for shore and surrender them all to the police.

== Cast ==
- Albert Lieven as Mark
- David Greene as Johnny
- Norman MacOwan as Rigby
- Martin Benson as Luigi
- Jack Stewart as Matt
- Katherine Blake as Linda
- Joan Carol as Joan
- John Harvey as Roger
- John Longden as Stephen

== Production ==
It was filmed at a rented country estate in Gilston and on location around Portsmouth. Sewell used his own private yacht in the film.

== Critical reception ==
The Monthly Film Bulletin wrote: "A good setting and an adequate idea are wasted in a film which suffers from incoherent plot development, clumsy handling, and generally indifferent performances."

Picturegoer wrote: "An untidy and dilatory production with a lighthouse as the main setting. The lighthouse background is out of the ordinary, but the story is unconvincing, and both acting and dialogue are stilted."

Picture Show wrote: "'Somewhat highly coloured melodrama."

The Radio Times called it "dismal" writing: "Quota quickie veteran Vernon Sewell gets matters off to a promising start as a desperate gang of bank robbers are rescued from the stormy sea by a lighthouse crew. By tossing away the dramatic possibilities of the claustrophobic setting, however, he is unable to sustain more than a modicum of tension as the crew begin scheming to keep the swag for themselves, rather than let justice take its course."
