= Michael Hunt (actor) =

British actor (born 1930)

- Born: 15 May 1930; Oxfordshire, England
- Occupation: Actor
- Spouse: Adrienne Proud (m. 1973)
- Children: 2

Michael Albert Hunt (15 May 1930 - 2022) was an English retired film, television and stage actor.

== Biography and career ==
Hunt was born in 1930 in Oxfordshire, England and trained at the Italia Conti Academy of Theatre Arts. He participated in various films starting as a child and appeared in stage productions, including 'For Crying Out Loud' at the Stoll Theatre, London, in mid-1940s,'Serjeant Musgrave's Dance' at Royal Court Theatre, London in 1959 and 1963, and 'Johnny Fellowes' at the Hull New Theatre in 1961.

Hunt appeared in the Victory Royal Variety Performance at London Coliseum on 5 November 1945, which are attended by King George VI, Queen Elizabeth, Princess Elizabeth and Princess Margaret. This gala evening was broadcast on BBC Light Programme on same day.

Hunt also appeared on the radio programme The Will Hay Programme in 1945.

Hunt left acting to look after the family business.

== Personal life ==
Hunt married Adrienne Proud in 1973; they had two children: Benjamin (born 1978) and Sam (born 1982).

== Filmography ==
=== Film ===
Year	Title	Role	Notes
1942	The Great Mr. Handel	Kytch Boy	
1942	Thunder Rock	boy Briggs	uncredited
1958	Carry on Sergeant	Fourteenth recruit	
1962	The Amorous Prawn	R.A.F. sergeant	
1966	The Great St. Trinian's Train Robbery	extra	uncredited

=== Television ===
Year	Title	Episode(s)	Role	Network	Archive Status
1959	The Case Before You	Episode 2	Constable	BBC Television Service	Missing
1960	Danger Man	Series 1, Episode 12: The Sisters	Parsinski	ITV (ITC)	Exists
1960	Probation Officer	Series 2, Episode 12	Jim	ITV (ATV)	Missing
1961	Play of the Week	Series 7, Episode 8: Serjeant Musgrave's Dance	Constable	ITV (Granada)	Exists
1961	The Avengers	Series 1, Episode 25: A Change of Bait	Steed's helper	ITV (ABC)	Missing
1962	Z-Cars	Series 1, Episode 5: Big Catch	Station Sergeant Allan	BBC Television	Exists
1962	Z-Cars	Series 2, Episode 7: The Thin Girl	Mechanic	BBC Television	Missing
1963	Francis Durbridge Presents	The Desperate People: Episode 6	Sgt. Wainwright	BBC Television	Exists
