= The Gorbals Story =

1950 British film

- Trade poster
- Directed by: David MacKane
- Screenplay by: David MacKane
- Based on: play The Gorbals Story by Robert McLeish
- Produced by: Ernest Gartside
- Starring: Howard Connell; Marjorie Thomson; Betty Henderson
- Cinematography: Stanley Clinton
- Edited by: Helen Wiggins
- Production company: New World Pictures
- Release date: 1950
- Running time: 78 minutes
- Country: United Kingdom
- Language: English

The Gorbals Story is a 1950 British second feature ('B') film directed by David MacKane and starring Howard Connell, Marjorie Thomson and Betty Henderson. It was written by MacKane based on the 1946 play The Gorbals Story by Robert McLeish. The film is a melodrama about a young man desperate to escape the slums of Glasgow.

== Plot ==
Johnnie Martin is a young man living in the tenements of the Gorbals district of Glasgow, desperate to leave the area and to become an artist. He is almost driven to murder by the pressures of slum life, but eventually he manages to escape and achieves his ambition.

== Cast ==
- Howard Connell as Wullie Mutrie
- Marjorie Thomson as Jean Mutrie
- Betty Henderson as Peggy Anderson
- Sybil Thomson as Magdalene
- Eveline Garratt as Mrs. Reilly
- Jack Stewart as Peter Reilly
- Isobel Campbell as Nora Reilly
- Roddy McMillan as Hector
- Lothar Lewinsonn as Ahmed
- Russell Hunter as Johnnie Martin
- Carl Williamson as Francis Porter
- Ian Dalgleish as Dr Andrews
- Berta Cooper as Mrs Gilmour
- Abie Barker as "Puddin"
- Archie Duncan as Bull
- Andrew Keir as pub chucker-outer
- Ivor Kissen as telegraph boy
- Reginald Allan as Alec Cameron
- Aurae Edwards as Mary Cameron

== Critical reception ==
The Monthly Film Bulletin wrote: "Life in the tenements of a Glasgow slum. The naively written story (adapted from a play) is presented in theatrical rather than cinematic syle, genenally amateurish but with some accomplishment here and there. One respects its aims."

Kine Weekly wrote: "Searing yet thoughtful and, strangely enough, intensely human regional melodrama, actually set in the squalid Gorbals district of Glasgow. ...Russell Hunter turns in a skillfully graded study as Johnnie, Betty Henderson makes a likeable and understanding Peggy, and Howard Connell is responsible for a perfect cameo as the easy-going, hard-drinking Wullie. The supporting types are etched with like conviction. "

In British Sound Films: The Studio Years 1928–1959 David Quinlan rated the film as "mediocre", writing: "Well-intentioned drama; execution of it is on the amateurish side."

The reviewer for Picturegoer wrote: "While applauding the earnest initiative which brought it into being, I can't help feeling that too many opportunities are missed and that the overall treatment is very amateurish. ...It could have been a tremendously moving human essay, but it rarely rises above an emotional staginess, while its theatrical origin is clearly evident, particularly in the work of the players, who, though individually good, need far more skilful direction in the art of screen acting. But the greatest regret is that the camera – though performing some tricky contortion of light and shade – remains within the walls of the tenement almost entirely except for a couple of brief excursions into the streets. With a littlle imagination Glasgow would have become as much of a Naked City as New York. And such a background would have given a point and colour to the film which now seems curiously flat and lifeless."

== Home media ==
The film was released on DVD in 2014.
