= The Amorous Prawn =

1962 British film by Anthony Kimmins

- Original film poster
- Directed by: Anthony Kimmins
- Written by: Anthony Kimmins (play and screenplay); Nicholas Phipps
- Produced by: Leslie Gilliat
- Starring: Ian Carmichael; Joan Greenwood; Cecil Parker
- Cinematography: Wilkie Cooper
- Edited by: Thelma Connell
- Music by: John Barry
- Production company: Covent Garden Films
- Distributed by: British Lion Films
- Release date: 26 November 1962 (UK)
- Running time: 89 minutes
- Country: United Kingdom
- Language: English

The Amorous Prawn, also known as The Amorous Mr. Prawn, is a 1962 British comedy film directed by Anthony Kimmins and starring Ian Carmichael, Joan Greenwood, and Cecil Parker. The film was based on a 1959 farcical play by Kimmins.

In the United States, the film was retitled The Playgirl and the War Minister to exploit the Profumo affair.

== Premise ==
General Fitzadam receives his final posting in the remote Scottish Highlands. When the general and his wife discover that they cannot afford the country cottage where they plan to retire, his wife decides to run their residence as a hotel for wealthy Americans using the services of soldiers and an expert poacher.

== Cast ==
- Ian Carmichael as Corporal Sidney Green
- Joan Greenwood as Lady Dodo Fitzadam
- Cecil Parker as General Sir Hamish Fitzadam
- Dennis Price as Prawn (Mr Vernon)
- Robert Beatty as Larry Hoffman
- Liz Fraser as Private Suzie Tidmarsh
- Finlay Currie as Lochaye
- Robert Nichols as Sam Goulansky
- Bridget Armstrong as Private Biddy O'Hara
- Harry Locke as Albert Huggin
- Derek Nimmo as Private Willie Maltravers
- Roddy McMillan as Private McTavish
- Sandra Dorne as Busty Babs
- Michael Ripper as Angus
- Roberta Desti as jeweller's assistant
- Patrick Jordan as sergeant at guard
- Godfrey James as sergeant at exchange
- Gerald Sim as first telephone operator
- Geoffrey Bayldon as second telephone operator
- Eric Woodburn as publican
- John Dunbar as 1st pub customer
- Jack Stewart as second pub customer
- Drew Russell as airman
- Eric Francis as Jimmy, the policeman
- Michael Hunt as RAF sergeant
- Reg Lye as Uncle Joe (the poacher)

== Production ==
The original play had run for over 900 performances in the West End.

== Critical reception ==
The Monthly Film Bulletin wrote: "A pair of amorous prawns and their progeny processing behind the credit titles set the note of good, clean fun on which this inoffensive farce means to continue. In spite of a hoary formula and a slow start, the film has its amusing moments. The settings are easy on the eye, and some of the acting, especially Cecil Parker's suddenly benign air of conspiracy and Liz Fraser's imbecilic giggle, has charm. The climax, effectively tying up more loose ends than previously seemed to exist, is a glorious romp."

Variety called the film "non-demanding light entertainment, cheerfully put over by a reliable cast of popular British thesps."

The Radio Times Guide to Films gave the film 2/5 stars, writing: "Director Anthony Kimmins also wrote the play on which this is based and he hasn't really opened it out too much for the cinema. As a result, the talents of lan Carmichael are given little room."
