= Norman MacOwan =

Scottish actor and playwright (1877–1961)

Norman MacOwan (2 January 1877 – 31 December 1961) was a Scottish author, playwright, and actor, both on stage and in film.

== History ==
MacOwan was born in Hope Park, St Andrews, Scotland, the son of a Presbyterian minister.

He became well known as an actor, appearing as the name part in a stage adaptation of Booth Tarkington's Monsieur Beaucaire no less than 677 times.

He became well known as author of plays for the stage.

In 1924 he published his first novel, The Infinite Shoeblack (Note: A reference to Carlyle's epigram in Sartor Resartus: "Can all the finance ministers of Europe make one shoeblack happy?") to glowing reviews.

He was a member of Dion Boucicault's company, whose members included Mary Jerrold, Hubert Harben and Mary Hinton, that toured Australia in 1926.

== Plays ==
- The Chalk Line with a cousin, Sir Fabian Ware. Its first production was in London in 1912
- The Demagogue
- The Blue Lagoon (1921), dramatization of De Vere Stacpoole's story
- Lord o' Creation
- Jacob's Ladder
- The Infinite Shoeblack (1930), dramatization of his own book
- Glorious Morning (1938), lambasting totalitarianism and predicting a second world war

== As actor ==
He appeared in films:

- The Dark Light (1951), also co-writer
- Valley of Eagles (1951)
- The Card (1952)
- Castle in the Air (1952)
- Footsteps in the Fog (1955)
- Where There's a Will (1955)
- X the Unknown (1956)
- Action of the Tiger (1957)
- Tread Softly Stranger (1958)
- Heart of a Child (1958)
- The Boy and the Bridge (1959)
- Kidnapped (1960)
- The City of the Dead (1960)

== Other interests ==
MacOwan was a keen and proficient golfer.
