= Weddings Are Wonderful =

1938 British film by Maclean Rogers

- Publicity shot for the film, with (L-R) June Clyde, Maclean Rogers, Muriel George and Frederick Lloyd
- Directed by: Maclean Rogers
- Written by: Douglas Hoare (play); Sydney Blow (play); Kathleen Butler; H. F. Maltby
- Produced by: George Smith
- Starring: June Clyde; Esmond Knight; René Ray
- Cinematography: Geoffrey Faithfull
- Edited by: Daniel Birt
- Music by: Harris Weston
- Production company: Canterbury Films
- Distributed by: RKO Pictures
- Release date: 21 September 1938
- Running time: 79 minutes
- Country: United Kingdom
- Language: English
- Budget: £17,566

Weddings Are Wonderful is a 1938 British comedy film directed by Maclean Rogers and starring June Clyde, Esmond Knight and René Ray. It was written by Kathleen Butler and H. F. Maltbybeased on a play by Douglas Hoare and Sydney Blow, and was made at Walton Studios.

== Preservation status ==
The British Film Institute National Archive holds the film.

== Synopsis ==
When she discovers that he has been cut off by his father without a penny, the gold-digging singer Cora Sutherland abandons her fiancée Guy Rogers. However the same night he meets and falls in love with a young woman, Betty Leadbetter, who has taken shelter in his flat after escaping from a raid on a gambling club. Guy must persuade her strait-laced mother to allow them to marry while trying to fend off Cora who has heard about the relationship and sports an opportunity for blackmail.

== Cast ==
- June Clyde as Cora Sutherland
- Esmond Knight as Guy Rogers
- René Ray as Betty Leadbetter
- Frederick Lloyd as Mr. Leadbetter
- Bertha Belmore as Mrs. Leadbetter
- Bruce Seton as John Smith
- Anthony Holles as Adolph
- George Carney as Rogers
- Eliot Makeham as Minor role
- Muriel George as Betty's maid

== Reception ==
The Monthly Film Bulletin wrote: "The acting is poor, with the brilliant exception of George Carney. His is a small part, but it stands out from a welter of mediocrity in characterisation. The situations are commonplace and overlong, and the dialogue lacks sparkle."

Kine Weekly wrote: "Here we have a British farcical comedy of happy heritage; most of the gags and situations have been exploited before, but seldom in more enthusiastic circumstances. The evergreen, amplified by good teamwork and lavish production qualities, results in lively entertainment of considerable popular appeal. The cast is strong in names as well as talent."
