= George Maynard (film producer) =

British film producer (1909–1976)

- Born: 18 May 1909; London, United Kingdom
- Died: 1976 (aged 66–67); London, United Kingdom
- Occupation: Film producer
- Years active: 1946–69 (production)

George Maynard (18 May 1909 – 1976) was a British film producer. During the 1950s and 1960s he produced a number of independent films. Maynard had earlier worked as a production manager at several British studios.

== Selected filmography ==
- The Courtneys of Curzon Street (1947)
- Radio Cab Murder (1954)
- Where There's a Will (1955)
- Soho Incident (aka Spin a Dark Web) (1956)
- Rogue's Yarn (1957)
- The Strange World of Planet X (1958)
- Ferry to Hong Kong (1959)
- A Prize of Arms (1962)
- Zeta One (1969)

== Bibliography ==
- Chibnall, Steve & McFarlane, Brian. The British 'B' Film. Palgrave MacMillan, 2011.
- Hunter, I.Q. British Science Fiction Cinema. Routledge, 2002.
