= Ivan Foxwell =

British screenwriter and film producer (1914–2002)

- Born: Ivan Cottam Foxwell; 22 February 1914; London, England
- Died: 16 January 2002 (aged 87); London, England
- Spouses: Edith Lambart (m. 1940; div. 1974); Zena Marshall (m. 1991)

Ivan Cottam Foxwell (22 February 1914 – 16 January 2002) was a British screenwriter and film producer. The screenplay for Tiara Tahiti on which he worked was nominated for the BAFTA Award for Best British Screenplay in 1962.

Foxwell died in London at the age of 87.

== Selected filmography ==
Producer

- No Room at the Inn (1948)
- Guilt Is My Shadow (1950)
- The Intruder (1953)
- Colditz Story (1954)
- A Touch of Larceny (1959)
- Tiara Tahiti (1962)
- The Quiller Memorandum (1966)
