= The Boy and the Bridge =

1959 British film by Kevin McClory

- Opening titles
- Directed by: Kevin McClory
- Screenplay by: Kevin McClory; Geoffrey Orme; Desmond O'Donovan
- Story by: Leon Ware
- Produced by: David Eady; Kevin McClory
- Starring: Ian Maclaine; Liam Redmond; James Hayter
- Cinematography: Edward Scaife
- Edited by: Jack Slade
- Music by: Malcolm Arnold
- Production company: Xanadu Productions
- Distributed by: Columbia Pictures
- Release date: 28 July 1959 (United Kingdom)
- Running time: 91 minutes
- Country: United Kingdom
- Language: English

The Boy and the Bridge is a 1959 British drama film produced and directed by Kevin McClory and starring Ian Maclaine, Liam Redmond, James Hayter, Geoffrey Keen and Arthur Lowe. The film was shot during the summer of 1958 and set around London's Tower Bridge from which the film takes its name.

== Plot ==
Believing his widowed father, Pat Doyle, to have killed a man and that the police, having arrested him, will soon come to put him in a children's home, Tommy Doyle, a little cockney boy, runs away from his Bermondsey lodgings and seeks sanctuary within the confines of his dream castle, Tower Bridge. He makes his home in a room at the top of the north tower, coming and going without being seen and, bit by bit, furnishing it with all the ingenuity of a nine-year-old boy. Here, he makes one friend, a seagull he names Sammy. To the boy, the bridge is a living character with a personality of its own and the catwalks, staircases, engine rooms and bascule chambers are a magic world in which he is king. Although he takes care not to be seen, the maintenance staff become aware of a strange “presence” and their fears are confirmed when one night, Tommy saves the life of a suicidal woman who is about to jump off the bridge into the river. "DON'T", he yells down to her, "DON'T JUMP OFF MY BRIDGE!" The woman is so startled by this voice from somewhere up there, that she changes her mind, believing the voice to be of a supernatural origin. The next day, the newspapers follow up with the story that a protective spirit presides over the bridge. Searching ceaselessly for his son, his father is suddenly confronted by Tommy on the bridge. Following the boy to the top of the tower, he realises that the building has become father, mother and home to the boy, all the things that he should have been. He explains to Tommy that the bridge was built to bring people together and has brought them together too and, as Sammy flies away to join his own kind, Tommy agrees to come home.

== Cast ==
- Ian Maclaine as Tommy Doyle
- Liam Redmond as Pat Doyle
- James Hayter as tugboat skipper
- Norman MacOwan as tugboat engineer
- Geoffrey Keen as bridge master
- Jack MacGowran as market porter
- Royal Dano as evangelist
- Bill Shine as bridge mechanic
- Arthur Lowe as bridge mechanic
- Jocelyn Britton as young woman
- Andreas Malandrinos as organ grinder
- Stuart Saunders as publican
- Chili Bouchier as publican's wife
- Rita Webb as landlady

== Critical reception ==
The Monthly Film Bulletin wrote: "This first film, made by a young director who has worked with both Mike Todd and John Huston, is remarkable for its naiveté and its pretensions. Elaborately angled views of Tower Bridge, shots of a willing but not outstandingly talented small boy trotting up and down the bridge and the streets, occasional interludes with whimsical East End characters, are presented at a length that nothing in their content can justify; and the final reconciliation is as sentimentally moralistic as a Victorian nursery tale. Occasionally, notably in the child's resourceful attitude to his housekeeping problems, the picture stumbles into a mild charm. But childhood fantasy needs more than a few winning smiles and a pet seagull to keep it going."

British film critic Leslie Halliwell said: "This tiny fable adds up to very weak entertainment, despite inventive photography, because it has virtually no plot development."

== Ian Maclaine ==
Hailed at the time as a new child star – John Huston declared him the greatest find since Jackie Coogan – Ian Maclaine's real name was Ian McLenahan and he was born in Brighton, Sussex, in the summer of 1949 and was the son of an aircraft worker at De Haviland's Hatfield plant in Hertfordshire. When he was nine years old in the summer of 1958, and a pupil at Sir Thomas Abney Primary School in Stoke Newington, London, he won the part of Tommy Doyle after an exhaustive search, which saw the production team interview some 3,000 local boys. He had a brother, Keith, who was two years older than him and who had a small part in the film as a boy Tommy's father momentarily mistakes for Tommy while he is out looking for him at night. The Boy and The Bridge was given a royal premiere at the Curzon cinema, London, on Wednesday, July 22, 1959, where Maclaine was presented to HRH Princess Margaret and it was shown at the Venice Film Festival that year. At the festival, Kevin McClory was nominated as Best Director for the film. Maclaine also attended the festival, and was presented to the top film stars of the day. Maclaine married Cutina Drake in Southend-on-Sea in Essex at the age of 26 in 1975 and had two sons: Stuart, born in September 1976, and Alastair, born in November 1978 – both born in Southend-on-Sea.
