= The Strange World of Planet X =

1957 novel by René Ray

- First edition (publ. Herbert Jenkins)
- Author: Rene Ray
- Language: English
- Publication date: 1957

The Strange World of Planet X (1957) is a British science fiction horror novel, written by actress Rene Ray, a novelization of her 1956 TV serial of the same name. It is a cautionary tale about science.

== Plot ==
The book's plot, like that of the original television serial, is very different from that of the movie adaptation that followed. A pair of scientists experimenting with magnetic fields inadvertently open a pathway from our three-dimensional universe into a fourth dimension.

One of the two researchers, Gavin Laird, can only visualize the potential for the power that these experiments may bring him, but the other, his longtime friend and colleague David Graham, is deeply concerned with the dangers posed by such linkages between the dimensions, and the risks entailed by leaving such experiments in the hands of only two men. Laird sees only opportunity in front of him, while Graham is truly frightened about the forces the two may be dealing and tampering with.

Laird soon displays a reckless ambition that forces Graham to attempt to sabotage their work in order to slow it down and buy time, hoping to convince his colleague to be more cautious. Caught between them is Laird's wife Fenella, who is only distantly aware of the nature of their work, but is increasingly alarmed over her husband's single-minded obsession with these experiments and also horrified by a cruel, dangerous side of his personality of which she had previously been unaware. Overlapping games of cat-and-mouse, as Laird and Graham each try to thwart the other's efforts ensue, with Laird—the more reckless of the two—almost always having the upper hand, even to the point of conducting lethal experiments on human subjects.

== Film adaptation ==
The novel was adapted to film in 1957 under the same title; it was also known as Cosmic Monsters, The Crawling Terror, The Cosmic Monster, and The Crawling Horror. The film introduced wholly new elements to the plot, including the experiments attracting the full attention of the government, and also manifesting their effects outside of the laboratory, creating giant insects and spiders with the resulting radiation bursts caused by the powerful artificial magnetic fields, and also attracting the attention of alarmed extraterrestrials.
