= High Living =

- Genre: Soap opera
- Created by: Henry Hay
- Written by: Henry Hay; Jack Gerson
- Country of origin: United Kingdom
- Original language: English
- No. of episodes: ~200

Production
- Running time: 15–30 minutes
- Production company: Scottish Television

Original release
- Network: ITV
- Release: 5 December 1968 – 19 August 1971

Related
- A Place of Her Own

High Living is the first British soap opera to be produced in Scotland, and was produced by Scottish Television. The series was conceived by Henry Hay and episodes were written by Henry Hay and Jack Gerson, (who would later create The Omega Factor).

== History ==
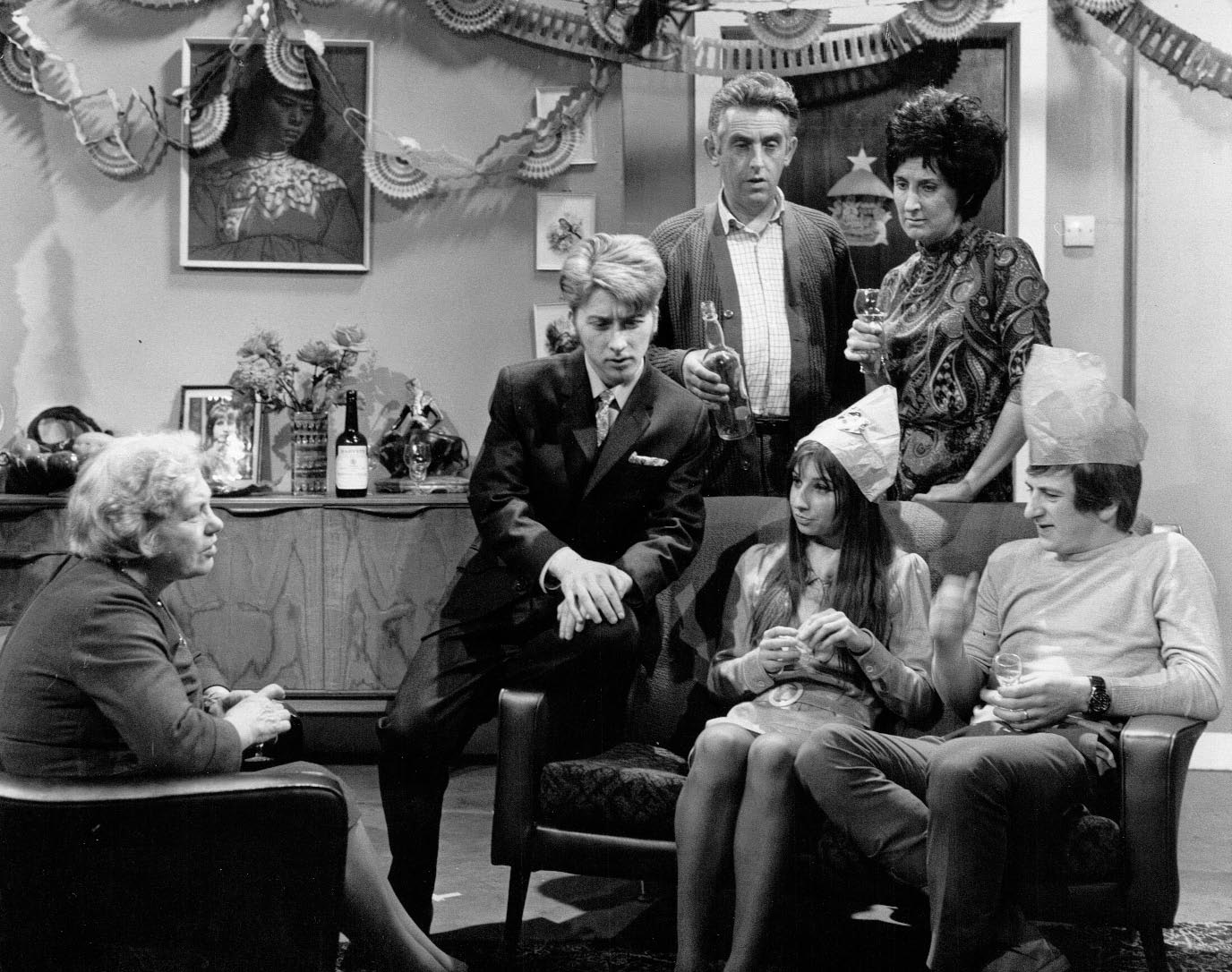
On the set of High Living

High Living featured the Crombie family (Andy, Kate and their children) who, in the first episode "The Flitting", moved into a new apartment in a high-rise apartment block in Glasgow called Caulton Court (the exterior shots in the opening credits were filmed in Wyndford in Glasgow).

A spin-off series entitled A Place of Her Own was first broadcast on 21 October 1971, and featured a newly widowed Kate Crombie (it ran for 13 episodes). It was also shown on Grampian Television shortly afterwards and on HTV during the summer of 1972.

=== Series ===
The first episode was broadcast on 5 December 1968. Originally episodes were 15 minutes long, broadcast three times a week; by March 1969 this changed to a 30-minute format broadcast on Thursday, with about 200 episodes being produced. The last episode was broadcast on 19 August 1971 on Scottish Television. All filmed episodes of High Living are believed to have been wiped, destroyed or lost but two scripts of High Living have survived, the first episode with a synopsis of the show and summary of characters and episode 137.

A number of other ITV companies did broadcast the series:

- Grampian Television: All episodes, 1969 – 1971.
- Border Television: All episodes, 1969 – 1971.
- HTV: from 1969 until mid 1970
- ATV and Southern Television: 6 January – July 1969, before being dropped.

== Cast ==
- Tommy Crombie – John Buick
- Kate Crombie – Clare Richards
- Andy Crombie – Ken Henderson
- Chrissie Crombie – Jennifer Angus
- Meg Nairn – Emma Chapman
- Kipper Lynch – Phil McCall
- Nora Murdoch – Bobbie Willis
