= No Room at the Inn =

- Directed by: Daniel Birt
- Written by: Ivan Foxwell; Dylan Thomas
- Produced by: Ivan Foxwell
- Starring: Freda Jackson; Ann Stephens; Joan Dowling; Joy Shelton
- Cinematography: James Wilson
- Edited by: Charles Hasse
- Music by: Hans May
- Production company: British National Films
- Distributed by: Pathé Pictures (UK); Stratford Pictures (US)
- Release date: 25 October 1948
- Running time: 82 minutes
- Country: United Kingdom
- Language: English
- Box office: £193,557 (UK)

No Room at the Inn is a 1945 play by Joan Temple that became a 1948 film directed by Daniel Birt. Both play and film are presented in flashback mode and share the same subject matter – cruelty, neglect and mental and physical abuse meted out to evacuee children during World War II. Temple's attack on those who turn a blind eye to child abuse, be they public officials or private individuals, was considered frank and uncompromising in its time.

The film version was the last movie made by British National Pictures.

== Plot ==
As part of the mass evacuation of children in the early months of World War II, teenage Mary O'Rane is billeted with Mrs Agatha ('Aggie') Voray in an unthreatened area in the north of England. Mary soon discovers that, behind her respectable front, Mrs Voray forces her evacuee charges (five in all) to live in squalor and semi-starvation while spending the money intended for their upkeep on alcohol and personal fripperies. Yet when Mary is visited by her father, Mrs Voray easily convinces him that Mary's allegations are groundless; to Mary's horror, he ends his visit by accompanying Mrs Voray on a pub crawl. Mary's young schoolteacher, Judith Drave, takes her concerns about the children's welfare to the local authorities but is ignored. Mary, meanwhile, is coaxed into petty crime by her fellow evacuee Norma. Matters come to a head when Mrs Voray goes out for the evening and returns to find that her new hat has been damaged. In an alcohol-fuelled fury, she locks little Ronnie in the coal cellar for the night. In the small hours, Mary and Norma sneak out of bed to release him, leading, in an unexpected turn of events, to Mrs Voray's accidental death.

== Film cast ==
- Mrs Voray – Freda Jackson
- Mary O'Rane – Ann Stephens
- Norma Bates – Joan Dowling
- Judith Drave – Joy Shelton
- Mrs Waters – Hermione Baddeley
- O'Rane – Niall MacGinnis
- Rev Allworth – Harcourt Williams
- Burrells – Frank Pettingell
- spiv – Sydney Tafler
- Lily – Betty Blackler
- Irene – Jill Gibbs
- Ronnie – Robin Netscher
- Councillor Green – Wylie Watson
- Councillor Trouncer – James Hayter
- news editor – Eliot Makeham
- Councillor Wordsworth -– Jack Melford
- vicar's maid – Marie Ault
- barmaid – Vera Bogetti
- spiv's date – Dora Bryan
- tobacconist – Harry Locke
- council chairman - Frederick Morant
- Councillor Medlicott – Bartlett Mullins
- store detective – Cyril Smith
- Mrs Jarvis – Beatrice Varley

== Play ==
Temple's original title was Weep for Tomorrow, but this was changed before the play went into production. In her stage directions, Temple offered the following description of the central figure, Mrs Voray: "She is about 40, and her black hair, lately 'permed', hangs in curls about her shoulders, making her look rather older than she wishes to appear. Her face is clumsily made-up. She is fond of glassy-looking satin blouses in crude colours ... A cigarette hangs from her lips."

Directed by Anthony Hawtrey, No Room at the Inn opened at the Embassy Theatre in Swiss Cottage, north London on 10 July 1945, with Freda Jackson, Ursula Howells, Joan Dowling and Ruth Dunning heading a cast of 14. The stage set for the production represented "the living-room of a small house in a 'safe' area" and was created by the Embassy's resident designer Henry Bird, who was also Jackson's husband.

After a provincial tour, Hawtrey's production arrived at the Winter Garden Theatre in Drury Lane, London on 3 May 1946. Presented by impresario Jack Hylton and advertised as 'A New Sensational Drama', the play's run in the West End lasted for 427 performances, closing on 24 May the following year, then touring again. "I consider Miss Joan Temple's timely and full-blooded drama of what can happen to child evacuees in war-time," noted Hawtrey in his introduction to the published text, "to be one of the most perfectly constructed plays of recent years, as well as being a most exciting play to produce, and one with enormous scope for a producer."

=== Original cast – Embassy and Winter Garden Theatres ===
- Norma Smith – Joan Dowling {Embassy and WG], Dora Bryan [WG from March 1947]
- Judith Drave – Ursula Howells [Embassy], Gwen Watford [WG]
- Irene Saunders – Valerie Forrest
- Lily Robins – Billie Brook [Embassy], Kathleen Nugent [WG]
- Ronnie Chilbury – John Potter [Embassy], Stanley Conett (Stanley Owen Heinemann) [WG]
- Mary O'Rane – Mary Kimber
- Kate Grant – Ruth Dunning
- Mr Burrells – Tony Quinn
- Inspector Willis – Neville Brook
- Mrs Voray – Freda Jackson
- Mrs Waters – Doris Rogers
- Terence O'Rane – David Laing [Embassy], Humphrey Heathcote [WG]
- Mr Bowken – Alfred Hirst
- Rev James Allworth – Christopher Steele

== Newspaper adaptation ==
In November 1946 the Daily Express devoted space in the paper for a week to a specially prepared version of the play. It explained that it had taken the decision:

"because the terrible and cruel conditions under which Britain's orphan children are still living has not been brought home adequately either to officialdom or to the public at large."

== Film production ==
The film version, made by British National Films at the National Studios in Elstree, began shooting in March 1948. Vernon Sewell had been scheduled to direct at an early stage, but the job went to Daniel Birt. Birt has just made The Three Weird Sisters (1948) for British National.

The screenplay by producer Ivan Foxwell and poet Dylan Thomas made various changes to Temple's play – opening it out to include Mrs Voray's encounters with local tradesmen, the Town Council and, finally, a monied spiv; conflating the extremely similar characters of Kate Grant and Judith Drave into one (Judith); changing the surname of Joan Dowling's character and having her recount a cockney version of the Cinderella story, and radically altering the nature of Mrs Voray's demise.

The screenplay subsequently formed the basis of a novelisation by Warwick Mannon (pseudonym of the poet and literary critic Kenneth Hopkins), published by World Film Publications to coincide with the film's release in 1948.

== Filmg Release ==
=== Critical ===
Opening in London on 25 October, with general release following on 22 November, the film was described in the trade paper To-Day's Cinema as "a brutal citation of sordidness and cruelty which has no parallel on British screens." Another reviewer, Virginia Graham in The Spectator, pointed out that "Miss Joan Temple's tormenting play about war-time evacuee children billeted on a drunken slut has been turned into an equally tormenting film. No Room at the Inn gives Miss Freda Jackson ample scope to be as savagely nasty as she pleases, and I must say she is alarmingly successful. Miss [Hermione] Baddeley blowsily supports her, and Miss Joan Dowling is admirable as a pert, blackmailing adolescent."

Variety wrote "the picture version bears obvious traces of its theatrical origin, being restricted in settings and lacking in movement. Nonetheless, it isn’t lacking in dramatie values, but its fate in America is predetermined by the overwhe!ming use of Cockney English. which dominates the entire script."

=== Box office ===
Trade papers called the film a "notable box office attraction" in British cinemas in 1948.

It was the last film made by British National.
