= Joan Temple =

British actress and playwright (1887–1965)

Joan Temple (c.1887 – 6 May 1965) was a British actress and playwright, best known for her play No Room at the Inn which was made into a film of the same name.

== Career ==
Temple won the Bancroft Gold Medal at RADA in 1916. Following her training at RADA she continued to work with the Ex-Students' Club and her play The Plunge, a dramatisation of the novel by St John Lucas, was performed by the club and nominated as one of the Plays of the Year in The Stage.

Her play The Widow's Cruise used the war to examine women's traditional domestic roles and relationships to the family; this was a common theme for women playwrights in the 1920s and 1930s.

Charles and Mary, performed in London in 1930, was based on the lives of the essayist Charles Lamb and his sister Mary Lamb. She played the part of Mary, with Peter Ridgeway playing Charles. In 1931 she performed in a play Mrs Fischer's War, written with Henrietta Leslie, adapted from Leslie's book of the same name.

Her best known play was No Room at the Inn about evacuee children during World War II. It played over 400 performances at the Winter Garden. It was made into a film of the same name in 1948. A German translation was performed in Berlin in 1954.

In the late 1940s she called for a revival of playwriting, and the fostering of new talent by enabling new playwrights to have their work performed instead of theatres performing revivals of older works.

== Personal life ==
Temple died in Bexhill-on-Sea in 1965, aged 78.

== Works ==
=== Novels ===
- Duologue (1934)

=== Plays ===
- The Plunge (1922)
- The Lesson (1924)
- The Halo (1925) - adapted from the book by Bettina von Hutten
- The Widow's Cruise (1926) – a comedy
- Aspidistras (1926) later played as The Cage (1927)
- A Hen upon a Steeple (1927)
- Mrs Fischer's War (1931) - with Henrietta Leslie
- Charles and Mary (1930)
- Flowery Walk (1934)
- No Room at the Inn (1946)
- Deliver my Darling (1948)
