= Teddy Boys =

Members of a British youth subculture

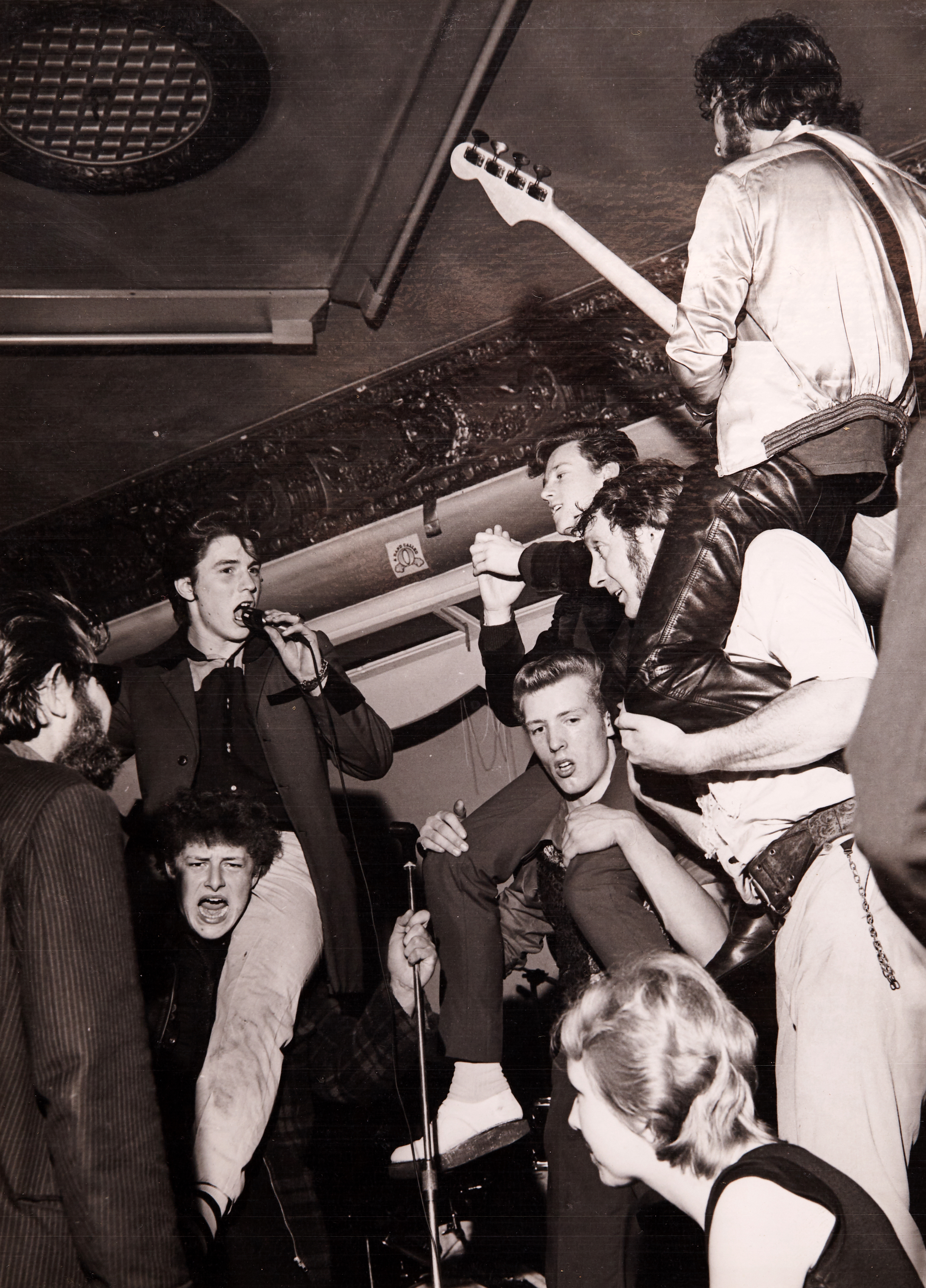
Teddy Boys playing music at the Queens Hotel, 1977

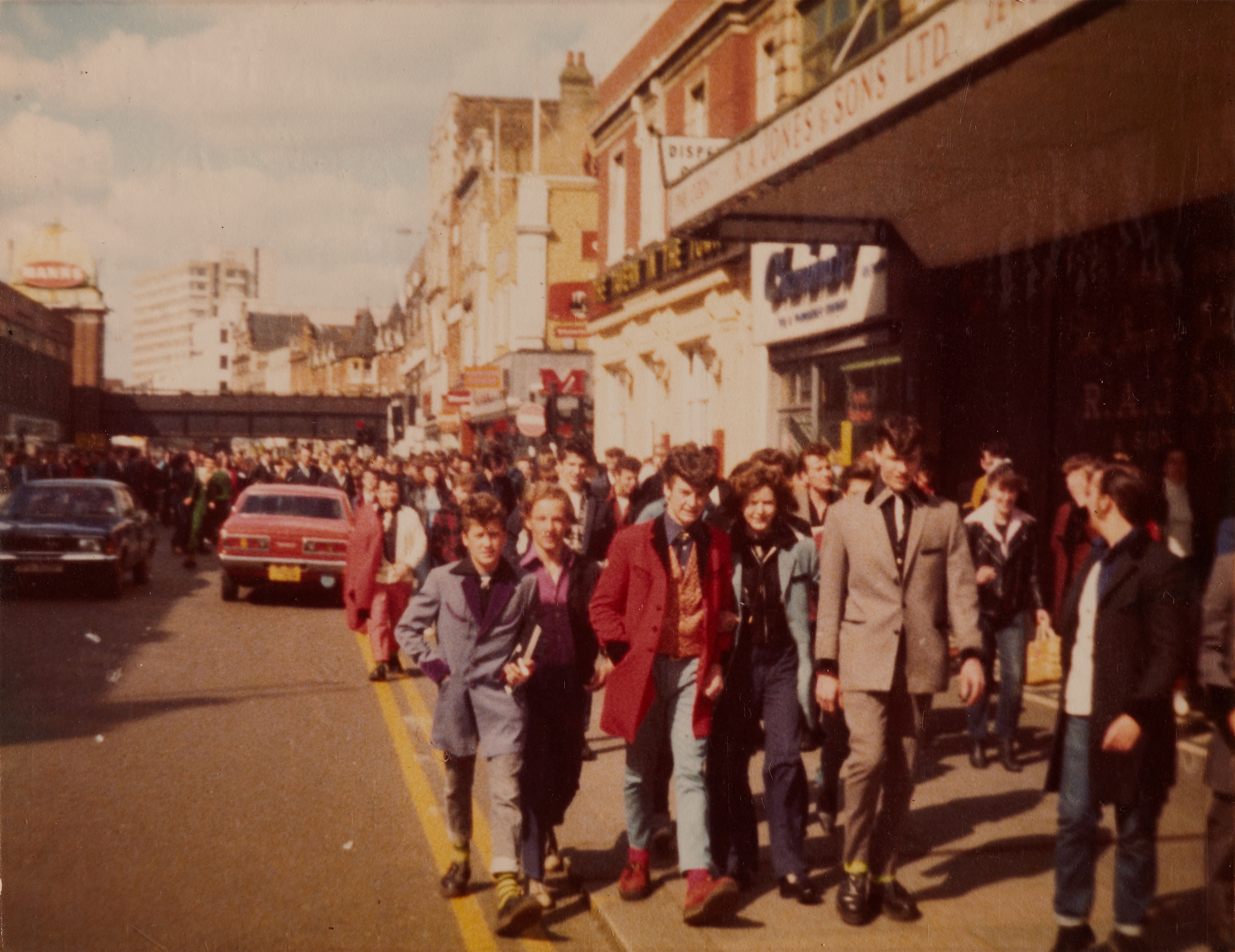
Teddy Boys walking on a busy street, 1977

The Teddy Boys or Teds were a mainly British youth subculture originating in the early 1950s to mid-1960s and then revived in the 1970s who were interested in rock and roll and R&B music, wearing clothes partly inspired by the styles worn by dandies in the Edwardian period, which Savile Row tailors had attempted to reintroduce in Britain after the Second World War.

== History ==
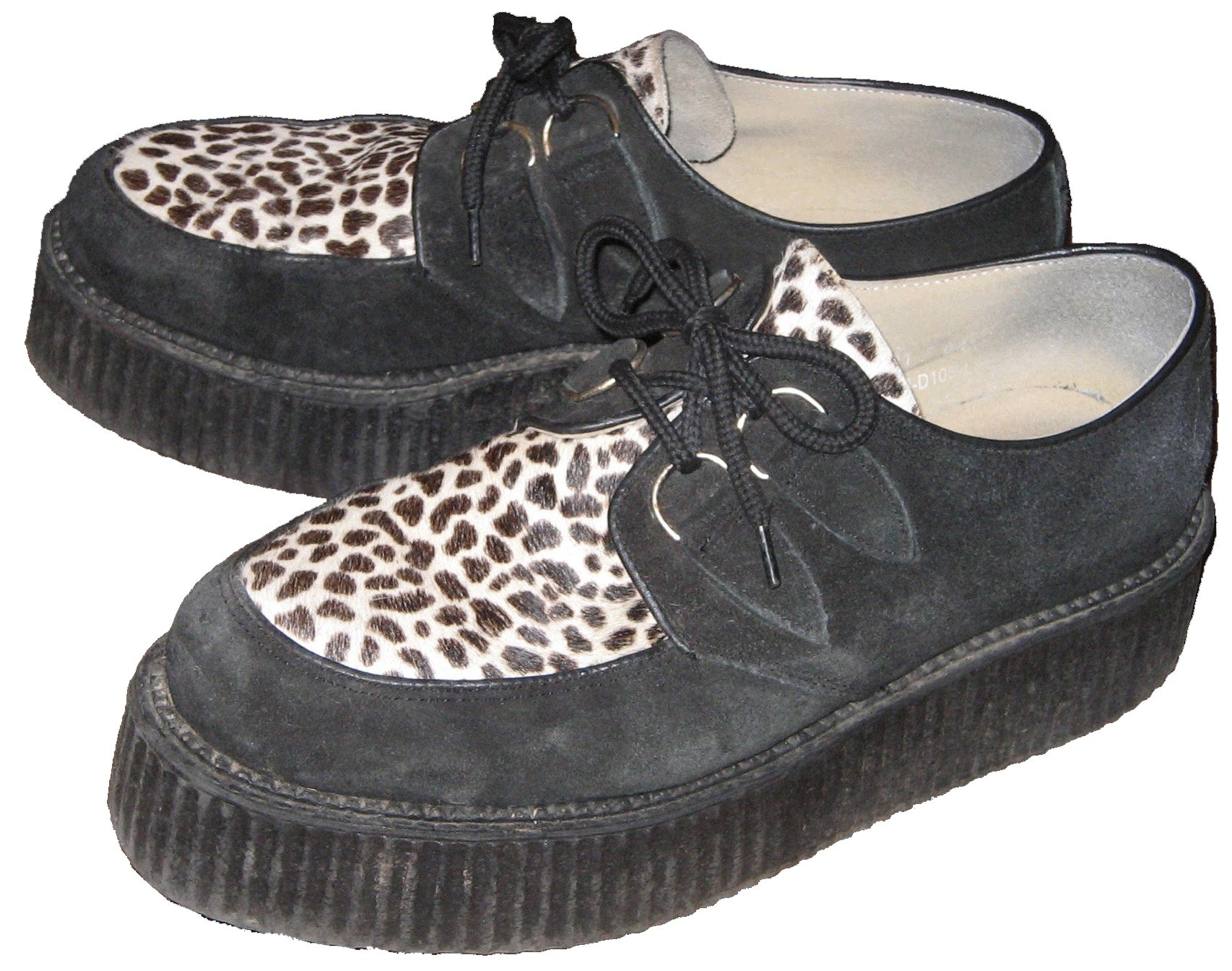
Typical black suede creepers fashionable during the 1950s

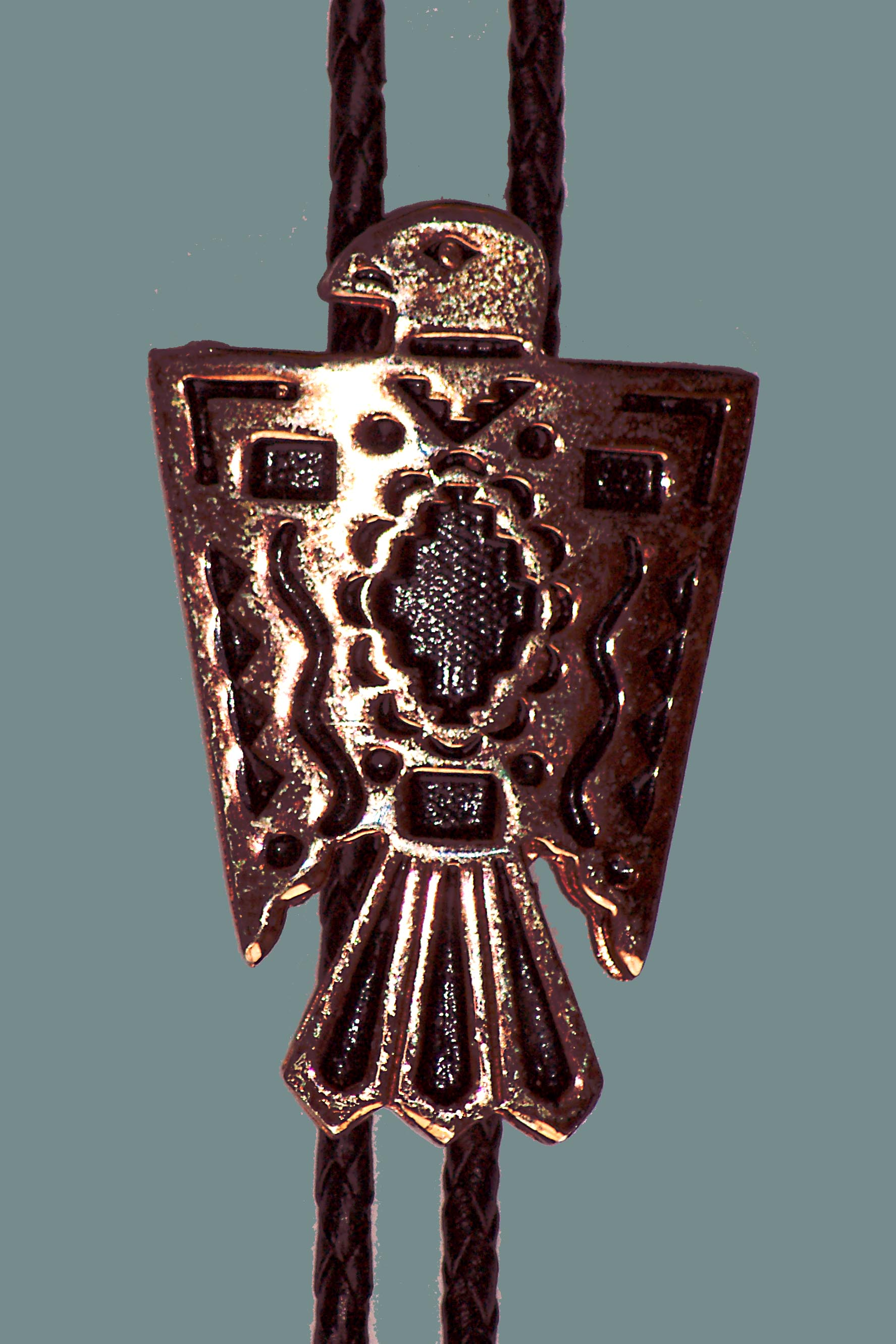
Bolo tie featuring Native American design

A mainly British phenomenon, the Teddy Boy subculture started among teenagers in London in the early 1950s, and rapidly spread across the UK, becoming strongly associated with American rock and roll music. After World War II, male youths in delinquent gangs who had adopted Edwardian-era fashion were sometimes known as Cosh Boys, or Edwardians. The name Teddy Boy came into official use when a 23 September 1953 Daily Express newspaper article shortened Edwardian to Teddy (which can be a diminutive form of either Edward or Theodore). The term had previously been used in Edwardian Britain to refer to members of the Territorial Army (see for example The Swoop! written by P. G. Wodehouse in 1909). This was a reference to the king, Edward VII, in whose service they were.

In post-war Britain, rationing continued to affect the fashion industry until it ended in 1949 and men's tailors in central London devised a style based on Edwardian clothing hoping to sell to young officers being demobilized from the services. However, the style—featuring tapered trousers, long jackets similar to post-war American zoot suits, and fancy waistcoats—was not popular with its target market, leaving tailors with piles of unsold clothing which, to recoup losses, were sold cheaply to menswear shops elsewhere in London. While there had been some affluent adoption—"an extravagant upper-class snub to the post-war Labour Government and its message of austerity"—it was predominantly suburban working-class youth who adopted and adapted the look ("spiv" and cosh boy associations also hastened its middle-class rejection) and, around 1952, what became the "Teddy Boy" style began to emerge, gradually spreading across Britain. The 1953 film Cosh Boy (US: The Slasher), written by Lewis Gilbert and Vernon Harris, makes an early reference to the style when the character, Roy (James Kenny), speaks the words "[it's a] drape...the latest cut".

Although there had been youth groups with their own dress codes called scuttlers in 19th-century Liverpool and Manchester, Teddy Boys were the first youth group in Britain to differentiate themselves as teenagers, helping create a youth market. The 1955 US film Blackboard Jungle marked a watershed in the United Kingdom. When shown in an Elephant and Castle cinema, south London in 1956, the teenage Teddy Boy audience began to riot, tearing up seats and dancing in the cinema's aisles. After that, other riots took place around the country where the film was shown.

Some Teds formed gangs and gained notoriety following violent clashes with rival youth gangs as well as unprovoked attacks on immigrants. The most notable clashes were the 1958 Notting Hill race riots, in which Teddy Boys were present in large numbers and were implicated in attacks on the Caribbean community. According to reports released decades after the riots, "Teddy Boys armed with iron bars, butcher's knives and weighted leather belts" participated in mobs "300- to 400-strong" that targeted black residents, in one night alone leaving "five black men lying unconscious on the pavements of Notting Hill." Teds were also implicated in the clashes of the 1958 St Ann's riots in Nottingham.

The violent lifestyle was sensationalised in the pulp novel Teddy Boy by Ernest Ryman, first published in the UK in 1958.

== Style ==
Teddy Boy clothing included drape jackets reminiscent of 1940s American zoot suits worn by members of Italian-American, Chicano and African-American communities (such as Cab Calloway or Louis Jordan), usually in dark shades, sometimes with a velvet trim collar and pocket flaps, and high-waist "drainpipe" trousers, often exposing the socks. The outfit also included a high-necked loose-collared white shirt (known as a Mr. B. collar, because it was often worn by jazz musician Billy Eckstine); a narrow "Slim Jim" tie or western bolo tie, and a brocade waistcoat. The clothes were mostly tailor-made at great expense, and paid through weekly installments.

Favoured footwear included highly polished Oxfords, chunky brogues, and crepe-soled shoes, often suede (known as brothel creepers or beetle crushers). Preferred hairstyles included long, strongly moulded greased-up hair with a quiff at the front and the side combed back to form a duck's arse at the rear. Another style was the "Boston", in which the hair was greased straight back and cut square across at the nape.

=== Teddy Girls ===
Teddy Girls (also called Judies) wore drape jackets, pencil skirts, hobble skirts, long plaits, rolled-up jeans, flat shoes, tailored jackets with velvet collars, straw boater hats, cameo brooches, espadrilles, coolie hats and long, elegant clutch bags. Later, they adopted the American fashions of toreador trousers, voluminous circle skirts, and hair in ponytails.

The Teddy Girls' clothing choices were not strictly for aesthetic effect; the girls were collectively rejecting post-war austerity. They were young working-class women from the poorer districts of London who would typically leave school at the age of 14 or 15 to work in factories or offices. Teddy Girls spent much of their free time buying or making their trademark clothes. Their style originated from a head-turning, fastidious style from the fashion houses, which had launched haute-couture clothing lines recalling the Edwardian era. "It was our fashion and we made it up," declared one "Judie", succinctly writing the mantra of the Teddy Girl ethos.

The style was documented by Ken Russell in a June 1955 series of Picture Post photographs titled "Teddy Girls". Russell noted that the female counterpart of the Teddy Boy subculture was overlooked, saying: "No one paid much attention to the teddy girls before I did them, though there was plenty on teddy boys."

== Music and dancing ==
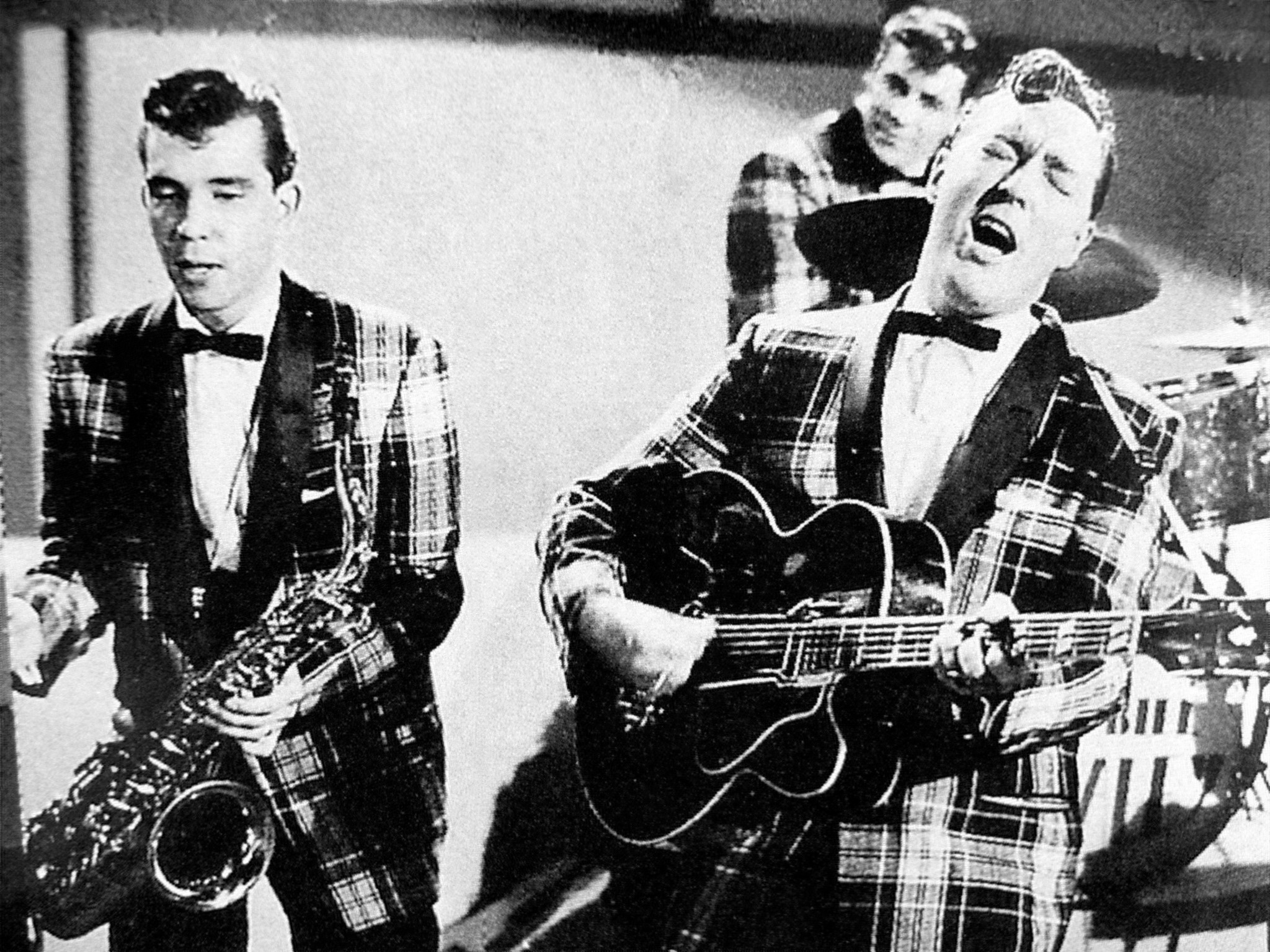
Bill Haley and the Comets wearing tartan shawl collar jackets associated with the rockabilly subculture, 1956

Although Teddy Boys became associated with rock and roll music, prior to the advent of that genre, Teddy Boys also listened and danced to jump blues, R&B, jazz and skiffle music. A well-known dance that the Teddy Boys adopted was The Creep, a slow shuffle that was so popular with Teddy Boys that it led to their other nickname, Creepers. The song "The Creep" came out in 1953 and was written and recorded for HMV by Yorkshire-born big band leader and saxophonist Ken Mackintosh. Although this was not a rock and roll record, it was widely taken on by the Teddy Boys of the time. From 1955, rock and roll was adopted by the Teddy Boys when the film Blackboard Jungle was first shown in UK cinemas, and Teddy Boys started listening to artists including Elvis Presley, Bill Haley and Eddie Cochran.

Although not as big as the Americans, British rock and roll artists such as Tommy Steele, Marty Wilde, Cliff Richard, Dickie Pride, and Joe Brown became popular with the Teddy Boy culture, as did the Merseybeat scene in the early 60s. The Beatles' George Harrison and John Lennon emulated the Teddy Boy style in the early formation of the band. Original British rock stars such as Billy Fury also moved to the latest of rock and roll, such as beat music during the early 1960s.

== Revivals ==
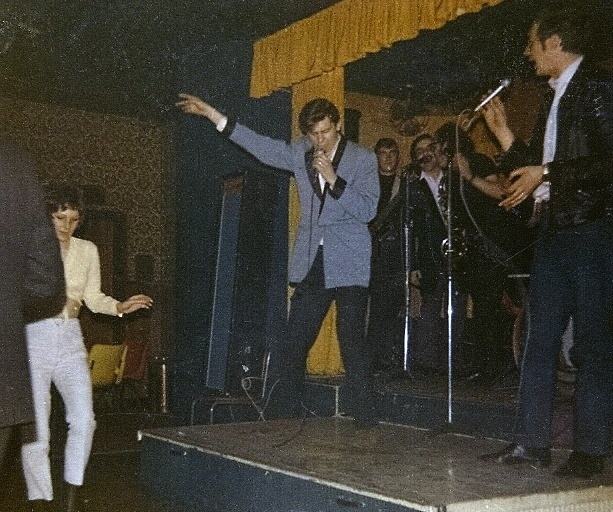
Shakin' Stevens wearing electric blue drape jacket, 1970s

Following The London Rock and Roll Show held at Wembley Stadium in August 1972 (featuring American performers including Little Richard, Jerry Lee Lewis, Chuck Berry, and Bill Haley, plus UK-based support acts), the music enjoyed a renewed period of popularity. Musical momentum was maintained by the release of films such as American Graffiti and That'll Be the Day (both 1973) and glam rock reworkings by bands such as Wizzard, The Glitter Band, Mud and Showaddywaddy topping the pop charts from 1973.

Concurrently, a resurgence of interest in Teddy Boy fashions was promoted by Vivienne Westwood and Malcolm McLaren through their shop Let it Rock, on London's King's Road. The new generation of Teds adopted some aspects of the 1950s but with a large glam rock influence, including louder colours for drape jackets, brothel creepers, and socks and shiny satin shirts worn with bootlace ties, jeans and big-buckled belts. The 1970s Teddy Boys often sported flamboyant pompadour hairstyles in addition to long sideburns, and they added hairspray to grease/pomade to style their hair. In the late 1970s, the new generation became the enemies of the Westwood and Sex Pistols-inspired punks. In the spring of 1977, street battles between young punks and teds happened on London's King's Road, where the earliest new-wave shops, including Westwood and McLaren's Sex (which were by then no longer selling zoot suits and ted gear), were situated.

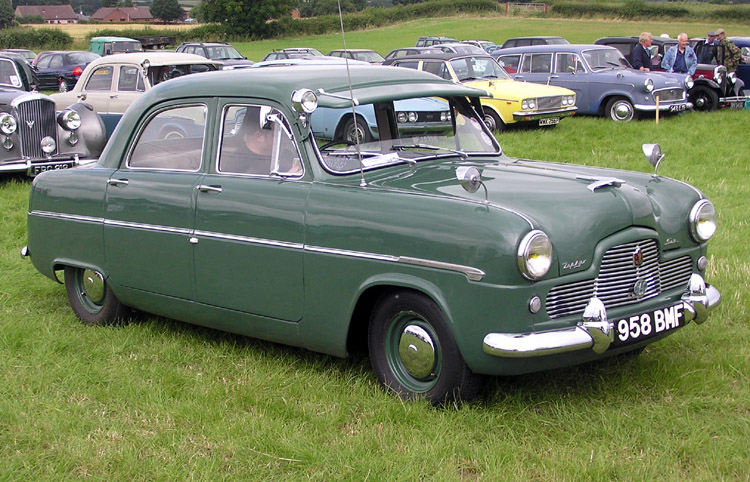
Ford Zephyr, a popular vehicle for Teds

In the late 1980s, there was a move by a number of Teddy Boys to revive the 1950s Teddy Boy style. In the early 1990s, a group of Teddy Boy revivalists in the Tottenham area of north London formed "The Edwardian Drape Society" (T.E.D.S.). The group concentrated on reclaiming the style which they felt had become bastardised by pop/glam rock bands such as Showaddywaddy and Mud in the 1970s.

== Portrayals in popular culture ==
- Early 1950s London gang culture was portrayed in the 1953 film Cosh Boy.
- A gang of criminal Teddy Boys are featured (donning their own 1950s black leather "Edwardian" style that included silly little hats) in the 1962 film set in Weymouth, The Damned.
- T.E.D.S. was the subject of a short film, The Teddy Boys, by Bruce Weber.
- Teddies inspired the gang of "droogs" in Anthony Burgess's 1962 novel A Clockwork Orange.
- Gangs of Teddy boys appear as supporting characters in the 1959 novel, and later 1986 movie, Absolute Beginners.
- A gang of Teddy Boys serve as minor antagonists in the John Lennon biographical film Nowhere Boy (2009).
- Teddy Boys play a minor role in the Blake and Mortimer book The Testament of William S..
- Occasionally, gangs of Teddy Boys show up to cause trouble in several episodes of Heartbeat which takes place at some time in the 1960s.

== See also ==
- 1950s in Western fashion
- Beatnik
- Bodgies and widgies, a similar subculture in Australia and New Zealand
- Greasers, a similar subculture in the United States
- Mods and rockers
- Ned, a subculture in Scotland said to predate and overlap with Teddy Boys
- Raggare, a similar subculture in Sweden
- Rocker (subculture)
- Stilyagi, a similar subculture in Soviet Russia
