= Elizabeth Coxhead =

English writer and mountaineer

- Born: Eileen Elizabeth Coxhead; 18 February 1909; Hinckley, England
- Died: 16 September 1979 (aged 70); Gerrards Cross, England
- Education: Somerville College, Oxford

Eileen Elizabeth Coxhead (18 February 1909 – 16 September 1979) was an English novelist, biographer, literary critic, journalist and mountaineer. Her novels include One Green Bottle (1951), The Midlanders (1953), The Figure in the Mist (1955) and The Friend in Need (1957). She also wrote Lady Gregory: A Literary Portrait (1961).

== Early life ==
Coxhead was born in Hinckley, Leicestershire to father G E S Coxhead and mother Margaret Duncan. Her maternal grandparents lived in Birkenhead and were Irish. Coxhead's father was headmaster of Hinckley Grammar School; she grew up in the headmaster's quarters and later attended the school herself. Coxhead was among the first women from her school to gain a place at Oxford, graduating from Somerville College with a degree in French.

== Career ==
Coxhead began her career working as a London journalist, first as a staff writer at The Lady and then as a freelancer on Fleet Street. In 1934, she and her younger sister Alison started mountain climbing at Wasdale Head. Despite her passion for climbing, Coxhead never joined a club. Also in 1934, Coxhead's debut novel The Street of Shadows was published via Cassell, described as a "clever satire on the film trade" by the Daily Express. This was followed by the romance June in Skye in 1938, set on the titular Hebridean island. Her 1949 novel A Wind in the West, published via Faber & Faber, is also set on a Hebridean island.

One of Coxhead's best known works is her 1951 novel One Green Bottle, which depicts an 18-year-old working class girl Cathy Canning from the Birkenhead docks who discovers rock climbing in North Wales. The novel was reportedly condemned by Bishop Douglas Crick for "explicitness", but well received by fellow rock climbers such as Jack Longland. This was followed by A Play Toward in 1952, centred around a school production, and The Midlanders in 1953, set in a fictional hosiery manufacturing town likely based on Hinckley.

Coxhead contributed an essay on mountain climbing to Max Robertson's 1955 winter sports book Mountain Panorama. That same year, she returned to the Scottish Isles as a setting and climbing as a theme in her novel The Figure in the Mist, following a suburban university student Agnes to Arran. This was followed by The Friend in Need in 1957, about London social workers, and The House in the Heart in 1959, set in Ireland.

In the 1960s, Coxhead moved into biography writing and literary criticism with a focus on Irish women writers, starting with Lady Gregory: A Literary Portrait in 1961. The book was described as the first of its kind about Lady Gregory. Coxhead subsequently wrote J.M. Synge and Lady Gregory for Longman, Green and Co's ongoing Writers and their Works series. Coxhead's 1965 work Daughters of Erin contains essays profiling five women of the Irish Renaissance.

Coxhead's tenth and final novel The Thankless Muse was published in 1967. According to Colin Smythe, the character of Thomas Laker "was largely based on what Edith Shackleton Heald had told her about her relationship with W. B. Yeats, when both women had worked at The Lady". Coxhead had an interest in gardening, writing the book One Woman's Garden, published in 1971. In 1975, Coxhead's Constance Spry: A Biography was published.

== Personal life ==
Coxhead lived in Chalfont St Peter, Buckinghamshire.

Coxhead was a socialist. She never married, opting to care for her nieces and nephews and later for her elderly mother. One of her nephews is the journalist and author Robert Chesshyre.

== Death and legacy ==
In 1970, after injuring herself in a fall, Coxhead committed suicide at Gerrards Cross. In 2009, Hinckley Civic Society honoured Coxhead with a blue plaque.

== Adaptations ==
The 1958 film A Cry from the Streets directed by Lewis Gilbert was adapted from Coxhead's 1957 novel A Friend in Need by Vernon Harris.

One Green Bottle was reportedly optioned for adaptation twice within Coxhead's lifetime.

== Bibliography ==
=== Novels ===
- The Street of Shadows (1934)
- June in Skye (1938)
- A Wind in the West (1949)
- One Green Bottle (1951)
- A Play Toward (1952)
- The Midlanders (1953)
- The Figure in the Mist (1955)
- The Friend in Need (1957)
- The House in the Heart (1959)
- The Thankless Muse (1967)

=== Biography and literary criticism ===
- Lady Gregory: A Literary Portrait (1961)
- J.M. Synge and Lady Gregory (1962)
- Daughters of Erin (1965)
- Constance Spry: A Biography (1975)

=== Other non-fiction ===
- Women in the Professions (1961)
- One Woman's Garden (1971)

=== Contributions ===
- "First Mountain" in Mountain Panorama (1955), edited by Max Robertson
- Edited and introduction in Selected Plays of Lady Gregory (1962)
- Introduction in Visions and Beliefs in the West of Ireland collected and arranged by Lady Gregory (1976)
