= Joy Shelton =

British actress (1922–2000)

- Born: Joy Winstanley Shelton; 3 June 1922; Marylebone, London, England
- Died: 28 January 2000 (aged 77); Richmond upon Thames, Surrey, England
- Years active: 1943–1993
- Spouse: Sydney Tafler (m. 1944; died 1979)
- Children: 3

Joy Winstanley Shelton (3 June 1922 – 28 January 2000) was an English actress who performed in films, radio and television.

== Biography ==
Joy Shelton was born in Marylebone, London, and trained at RADA. She appeared in a number of British films in the 1940s and '50s, including two by Sidney Gilliat: Millions Like Us (1943), which traced the wartime life of an ordinary London family, and Waterloo Road (1945), in which she was fought over by John Mills and Stewart Granger. Shelton was a radio personality and played the part of Joan Carr in The Adventures of PC 49 for the BBC. This series ran from 1947 until 1953, totalling 112 episodes. She also appeared in the film version, A Case for PC 49 (1950).

In 1944, Shelton married the actor Sydney Tafler; the couple's marriage lasted until he died in 1979 and they had three children, Jennifer, Jeremy and Jonathan. Shelton and Tafler acted together in six films. Jennifer Tafler acted as a child and appeared with both her parents in the film Emergency Call (1952), directed by Shelton's brother-in-law, Lewis Gilbert. Jonathan has been a member of the Royal Shakespeare Company and the BBC Radio Drama Company and features in the Barbra Streisand film Yentl (1983).

Joy Shelton died on 28 January 2000 at the age of 77.

== Major films ==
- Millions Like Us (1943) – Phyllis Crowson
- Bees in Paradise (1944) – Almura
- Waterloo Road (1945) – Tillie Colter
- Send for Paul Temple (1946) – Steve Trent
- Uneasy Terms (1948) – Effie
- No Room at the Inn (1948) – Judith Drave
- Once a Sinner (1950) – Vera Lamb
- Midnight Episode (1950) – Mrs. Arnold
- A Case for PC 49 (1951) – Joan Carr
- Emergency Call (1952) – Laura Bishop
- Park Plaza 605 (1953) – Pixie Everard
- Impulse (1954) – Elizabeth Curtiss
- No Kidding (Beware of Children in USA) (1960) – Mrs Rockbottom
- Five Golden Hours (1961) – Lady Guest
- The Greengage Summer (1961) – Mrs. Grey
- H.M.S. Defiant (1962) – Mrs Crawford – Damn the Defiant in USA

== TV series ==
- My Wife Jacqueline (1952) – BBC
- Roots (1979) – British TV series, not to be confused with the 1977 American miniseries Roots
- Z-Cars and Dixon of Dock Green – single episodes
