= Orbit One Zero =

- Genre: Science fiction
- Running time: 30 minutes
- Country of origin: United Kingdom
- Language: English
- Home station: BBC Home Service
- Starring: Felix Felton; David Spenser; Graydon Gould; Elaine MacNamara
- Created by: Peter Elliott Hayes
- Produced by: David Davis
- Original release: 21 April – 26 May 1961
- No. of episodes: 6
- Audio format: Monaural
- Website: Orbit One Zero at BBC Radio 4 Extra

Orbit One Zero is a BBC Radio science fiction programme written by Peter Elliott Hayes, and starring Felix Felton. A single series consisting of six episodes was produced which aired between 21 April 1961 and 26 May 1961.

== Cast ==
The four primary characters who appear are:

- Felix Felton as Dr Hayward Petrie
- David Spenser as Tom Lambert
- Graydon Gould as Clifford Brown
- Elaine MacNamara as Elizabeth Ryder

== Plot ==
Journalist Tom Lambert looks into his archives and begins to reinvestigate the events of ten years earlier. The situation involves university professor Dr Petrie inviting two students to an island off the west coast of Scotland named Scara to visit a radio telescope as they investigate strange signals. On the beach of the island, they discover a large cylindrical object, which is then uncovered in an attempt to discover its origin and purpose.

== Episodes ==
Six episodes were produced in a single series:

| No. | Title | Original release date |
|---|---|---|
| 1 | "The Unseeing Eye" | 21 April 1961 |
Newspaper reporter, Tom Lambert, decides to reinvestigate the events of a decade earlier when he looked at an incident in which students Clifford Brown and Elizabeth Ryder were invited by their professor to join a researcher working at a radio telescope on Scara, an island off Scotland. They discover a signal and a subsequent disturbance out in the sea and begin to investigate.
| 2 | "The Cylinder" | 28 April 1961 |
The Cylinder is discovered and removed from a sand bank, before being transported to the telescope control room. When the telescope operator is injured while trying to chisel open the discovery, Dr Petrie suggests moving it to his laboratory in London where they can work on it.
| 3 | "The Power" | 5 May 1961 |
A transparent green rod is discovered in The Cylinder which immediately causes damage to the laboratory building. Dr Petrie is invited by Tom Lambert to a former mine cave in Wales in which banging noises were reported and hear the story of a green light being seen by miners previously, linking the situation with that discovered on Scara.
| 4 | "The Voices" | 12 May 1961 |
Dr Petrie continues to gather information on the discovery, including more stories of unusual activity around the world involving a "green light". While alone in the laboratory at night, Elizabeth experiences the power of the rod which begins to control her mind.
| 5 | "The Frozen World" | 19 May 1961 |
Elizabeth is found in the laboratory frozen along with the rest of the room, but still alive. They find a tape recorder in the lab which contains a recording of the situation Elizabeth found herself in. The tape reveals the purpose of the rods, but the tape recorder fails before the entire message can be relayed.
| 6 | "The Unseen" | 26 May 1961 |
A signal is cracked which tells the story of two dominant races on a "tenth planet", with one managing to use the other's technology in an attempt to move to Earth where resources are more abundant. The rod also changes behaviour and begins to move, with Dr Petrie in pursuit, however another cracked signal raises hopes on defeating the rod.

== Broadcast History ==
The show was originally broadcast on the BBC Home Service. Repeats have since aired on BBC Radio 4 Extra.
