= Sean Bury =

British television and film actor

Sean Bury (born 15 August 1954 in Brighton, Sussex, England) is a British television and film actor, best known for his lead role as Paul Harrison in Lewis Gilbert's 1971 film Friends and the 1974 sequel Paul and Michelle.

== Career ==
At the age of nine he won a music scholarship to Winchester Cathedral Choir School, where he was a boarder and a chorister from 1963-67. He then received a music scholarship to Brighton College, which he attended from 1967-68, and attended Corona Stage School in London thereafter. He was fortunate enough to take over the role of one of the boys in the West End production of Alan Bennett's Forty Years On. Other stage performances include "Poor Horace" at the Theatre Royal in Bristol (1970), "Quetzalcoatl" at The Roundhouse in Chalk Farm (1972), and the Hampstead Theatre Club production of Stephen Poliakoff's Clever Soldiers (1974).

== Filmography ==
=== Films ===
- 1968: if.... .... Jute: Juniors
- 1971: Friends .... Paul Harrison
- 1971: The Abominable Dr. Phibes .... Lem Vesalius
- 1973: Story of a Love Story .... Stephen
- 1974: Paul and Michelle .... Paul Harrison
- 1977: The Spy Who Loved Me .... AB UC2 Fraser (HMS Ranger Crewman) (final film role)

=== Television ===
- 1964: Beware of the Dog .... David (6 episodes) Children's Film Foundation
- 1969: ITV Playhouse (End of Story) .... Toby (1 episode)
- 1970: The Misfit (On Being British) .... Simon (1 episode)
- 1971: ITV Saturday Night Theatre (Fly on the Wall) .... Bob Blissett (3 episodes)
- 1971: Tom Brown's Schooldays .... Denning (3 episodes)
- 1971: Sunday Night Theatre (First Sight) .... Peter
- 1972: The Onedin Line (Bloody Week) .... Jean-Paul (1 episode)

== Bibliography ==
- Holmstrom, John. The Moving Picture Boy: An International Encyclopaedia from 1895 to 1995. Norwich, Michael Russell, 1996, p. 305.
