= Cameron Hall (actor) =

English actor (1897–1983)

- Born: Rupert Cameron Hall; 6 January 1897; Hull, East Riding of Yorkshire, England
- Died: 19 December 1983 (aged 86); Sidmouth, Devon, England
- Occupation: Actor

Cameron Hall (6 January 1897 – 19 December 1983) was an English actor. He was born in Hull, East Riding of Yorkshire, and died, age 86, in Sidmouth, Devon.

== Selected filmography ==
- D'Ye Ken John Peel? (1935)
- First a Girl (1935) - Cast Member (uncredited)
- Dark World (1935)
- The Man Behind the Mask (1936) - Cast Member (uncredited)
- This'll Make You Whistle (1936) - Furnishings Salesman (uncredited)
- Conquest of the Air (1936) - Minor Role (uncredited)
- The Lilac Domino (1937) - Arnim
- Adventure's End (1937) - Slivers
- The Citadel (1938) - Man Who Buys Microscope (uncredited)
- Yes, Madam? (1939) - Catlett
- The Stars Look Down (1940) - Cinema Commissionaire (uncredited)
- Contraband (1940) - Naval Officer (uncredited)
- A Window in London (1940) - Hotel Doorman (uncredited)
- Three Silent Men (1940) - Badger Wood
- Neutral Port (1940) - Charlie Baxter
- Spellbound (AKA ' Passing Clouds '. Released as ' The Spell of Amy Nugent ', in USA) (1941) - Mr. Nugent
- East of Piccadilly (1941) - George
- I Thank You (1941) - Lomas
- South American George (1941) - (uncredited)
- Hard Steel (1942) - Flavell
- King Arthur Was a Gentleman (1942) - (uncredited)
- San Demetrio London (1943) - Mr. Nelson (uncredited)
- Mr. Emmanuel (1944) - Koch
- Loyal Heart (1946) - Edwards
- Beware of Pity (1946) - Mess Sergeant (uncredited)
- I'll Turn to You (1946) - The Neighbour (uncredited)
- I See a Dark Stranger (1946) - Tynwald Court Usher
- My Brother Jonathan (1948) - Joseph the Porter
- It's Hard to Be Good (1948) - Taxi Driver (uncredited)
- The History of Mr. Polly (1949) - Mr. Podger (uncredited)
- For Them That Trespass (1949) - Court Official (uncredited)
- Man on the Run (1949) - Reg Hawkins
- The Blue Lamp (1950) - Drunk (uncredited)
- Madeleine (1950) - Dr. Yeoman
- Once a Sinner (1950) - Mr. Baker
- Let's Have a Murder (1950)
- The Happy Family (1952) - Mayor
- Winnie the Pooh (1952) - Winnie-the-Pooh
- Cosh Boy (1953) - Mr. Beverley
- Impulse (1954) - Joe
- The Passing Stranger (1954) - Maxie
- Footsteps in the Fog (1955) - Corcoran
- Port of Escape (1956) - Bates
- Around the World in Eighty Days (1956) - Featured Player (uncredited)
- Another Time, Another Place (1958) - Alfy
- Stormy Crossing (1958) - Grantly Memorial Doctor
- Blood of the Vampire (1958) - Drunken Doctor
- Jack the Ripper (1959) - Hospital Porter Hodges / Dr. Tranter's Door Keeper
- Sink the Bismarck! (1960) - Civilian Worker on Prince of Wales (uncredited)
- Saturday Night and Sunday Morning (1960) - Mr. Bull
- Reach for Glory (1962) - Headmaster
- Rotten to the Core (1965) - The Admiral (final film role)
