= Plutarch's Staff =

Comic book

Plutarch's Staff (Le Bâton de Plutarque)
- Date: 2014
- Series: Blake and Mortimer

Creative team
- Writers: Yves Sente
- Artists: André Juillard; Etienne Schréder
- Colorists: Madeleine de Mille

Original publication
- Language: French

Translation
- Publisher: Cinebook Ltd

Chronology
- Preceded by: The Septimus Wave
- Followed by: The Testament of William S.

Plutarch's Staff is the 23rd adventure in the Blake and Mortimer series. It was written by Yves Sente and drawn by André Juillard and Étienne Schréder, with color by Madeleine de Mille. The volume was released on December 5, 2014. It was pre-published as a series of daily comic strips beginning in April 2014 in Le Soir, and repeated in the summer in Le Télégramme. The volume is a prequel to The Secret of the Swordfish: the title refers to the scytale, a military coding system and one of the oldest encryption systems in history.

== Plot ==
In spring 1944, a Horten Ho 229 flying wing of the Third Reich heads to London to destroy the seat of Parliament at the Palace of Westminster. British air defense was unable to intercept the jet, so Captain Francis Blake, squadron leader aboard the aircraft carrier The Intrepid, was sent to meet with the flying wing in a prototype airplane called the Golden Rocket. After an aerial battle dominated by the wing, Blake managed to prevail by crashing the rocket into the Nazi plane. In his parachute landing, he met Major Benson, a member of the secret services, he then accompanied him to the Cabinet of War. The aide of Benson, Lieutenant Harvey Clarke, introduced him to the work of the intelligence services. Blake then saves a trawler, the Diourbel, that is secretly carrying military equipment that will help during D-Day. Impressed by the capabilities of the young pilot, Major Benson decided with the agreement of Admiral Gray, Chief of Staff, to give him a secret mission to prepare for World War III. Indeed, services have accidentally discovered that in the greatest secrecy, a secretive dictatorship called the Yellow Empire, ruled by Basam Damdu, has set up an impressive military arsenal and is preparing to attack the West as soon as World War II is over. In this regard, the British built two secret bases: that of Scafell in England and the other in the Strait of Hormuz. Blake's first mission is to assist an engineer, in a crucial military operation for the Normandy landings.

The next day, Benson, Blake and Clarke travel to Scafell, hidden in a valley under an artificial cloud in the Lake District. Blake receives a pleasant surprise when the engineer with whom he must work is none other than Professor Philip Mortimer whom he met twenty years ago in India. The two friends summarize their lives before visiting the factory. At dawn, Benson, Mortimer, Blake and Clarke depart for the decryption center at Bletchley Park. While Mortimer unveils plans to Blake for his revolutionary weapon, the Swordfish, a mysterious individual spies on them. In the evening, the two friends are introduced to two agents there: Zhang Hasso, a defector from the Yellow Empire and Colonel Olrik, a specialist in Slavic languages. Going to bed, Mortimer realizes that some plans of the Swordfish were stolen. Meanwhile, Zhang Hasso, who expressed no confidence in Olrik at dinner, discovers that he is a double agent in the pay of the Yellow Empire. Surprised by the Colonel, he manages to make him believe he also works for the Yellow Empire. Zhang has no time to warn Blake and Mortimer since they leave the next day on a mission to Gibraltar.

Blake and Mortimer drop devices in the Strait of Gibraltar that are designed by the Mortimer to make the Germans believe that there is a significant concentration of Allied submarines in the Mediterranean and thus divert attention from Normandy. After an eventful arrival on the rock, they join the base controlled by the Colonel Longreach, whose aide is Lt. Brandon Clarke, twin brother of Harvey Clarke. The devices work perfectly, but Blake and Mortimer find a spy within the base who attempts to reveal the deception to the Italians. After a brief investigation during which Blake recalls several strange events that occurred in London and Bletchley Park, his suspicions fall on Brandon Clarke. Mortimer and Sergeant Duffelton confront Clarke who promptly tries to flee. Mortimer realizes that he and his brother Harvey communicate via the packages they send through an encryption system dating back to ancient Greece, a scytale or Plutarch's staff. Brandon confesses his betrayal before committing suicide with a cyanide capsule present in his jaw. In London, Major Benson, feeling disgraced, confronts Harvey before being killed by Clarke. Harvey then flees with Olrik. The latter kills Clarke without emotion and leaves for Lhasa with Hasso who has no choice but to follow.

On June 6, 1944, when Allied troops land in Normandy, Blake attends the funeral of Major Benson where his widow explains that the Clarke brothers held the major responsible for the death of their father in the Great War. She proposes to Blake to rent a floor of the house she owns at 99 Park Lane. In September 1946, British intelligence services learn that the attack of the Yellow Empire is imminent due to indications of Hasso, who became an undercover agent in Lhasa, but politicians do not want to hear about it. Blake joins the basic Scafell unaware that a transmitter placed there two years ago by Lieutenant Clarke indicates its location to the Yellow Empire. The book ends moments before another book in the series, Secret of the Swordfish, begins.

== Sources ==
- Article Récapitulatif des informations et images sur l'album (French)
