= Campbell Singer =

British actor (1909–1976)

- Born: Jacob Kobel Singer; 16 March 1909; London, England
- Died: 16 February 1976 (aged 66); London, England
- Occupations: Actor, writer
- Spouse: Gillian Maude (m. 1954)

Campbell Singer (born Jacob Kobel Singer; 16 March 1909 – 16 February 1976) was a British character actor who featured in a number of stage, film and television roles during his long career. He was also a playwright and dramatist.

== Life ==
He was born in London in 1909

Singer was a regular in British post-war comedy films, often playing policemen. He first appeared on television in 1946, making regular appearances in the following three decades including several episodes of Hancock's Half Hour, and played the lead, John Unthank, in the BBC drama series Private Investigator in 1958/59.

From the early 1960s he appeared more consistently on television. He played several roles in the 1966 Doctor Who story The Celestial Toymaker, and made two appearances in different roles in the popular television series Dad's Army, including as corrupt politician Sir Charles McAllister. He appeared in the 1967 The Avengers episode entitled "Who's Who???" as Major B. He also featured as Mr Finney in a Some Mothers Do 'Ave 'Em Christmas Special, and played a lodger in an episode of On the Buses.Singer also appeared as a bailiff in the Yorkshire Television series Rising Damp

As a writer, Singer co-wrote several plays with George Ross, including Guilty Party, Difference of Opinion and Any Other Business, some of which were also televised.

== Filmography ==
Year	Title	Role	Notes
1947	Take My Life	Police Station Sergeant	Uncredited
1947	Jim the Penman	Sutro	
1947	The Woman in the Hall	Von Soll's servant	
1948	Dick Barton - Special Agent	Sir George Cavendish	
1948	Operation Diamond	Bert	
1949	The Spider and the Fly	Belfort's Escort	Uncredited
1949	Rover and Me	Mr. Jackson	
1950	The Blue Lamp	Station Sergeant	Uncredited
1950	Hangman's Wharf	Inspector Prebble	
1950	Someone at the Door	Inspector Spedding	
1950	Cage of Gold	A Policeman	
1950	Dick Barton at Bay	Sir George Cavendish	
1950	Blackout	Inspector	
1951	The Quiet Woman		
1951	Pool of London	Station Sgt.	Uncredited
1951	A Case for PC 49	Sgt. Wright	
1951	The Case of the Missing Scene	Film Producer	
1952	The Happy Family	Policeman	
1952	Home at Seven	Inspector Hemingway	
1952	Emergency Call	Sgt. Phillips	
1952	Lady in the Fog	Inspector Rigby	
1952	The Ringer	Station Sergeant Carter	
1953	Time Bomb	Inspector Branson	
1953	The Yellow Balloon	Potter	
1953	Appointment in London	Flight Sergeant	
1953	The Titfield Thunderbolt	Police Sergeant	
1953	Street Corner	Desk Sgt. Bates	Uncredited
1953	The Intruder	War Office Clerk	
1953	The Girl on the Pier	Joe Hammond	
1954	Conflict of Wings	Flt. Sgt. Campbell	
1954	Forbidden Cargo	Sergeant Dodson, River Police	Uncredited
1954	To Dorothy a Son	Pub Landlord	
1956	Ramsbottom Rides Again		Uncredited
1958	Davy	Stage Doorkeeper	
1958	The Square Peg	Sergeant Loder	
1958	The Young and the Guilty	Joe Marshall	
1959	No Trees in the Street	Inspector	
1960	The Trials of Oscar Wilde	Inspector	
1960	The Hands of Orlac	Inspector Henderson	
1961	Girl on the Roof	Sir Archibald	Uncredited
1962	The Pot Carriers	Prison Officer Mott	
1962	The Wild and the Willing	Herbert Gilby	Uncredited
1962	On the Beat	Bollington	
1962	Flat Two	Hurley Brown	
1963	The Fast Lady	Kingscombe	
1964	Go Kart Go	Policeman	

== Television ==
Year	Title	Role	Notes
1951	The Man Who Disappeared	Dr. Watson	TV pilot
1951-59	BBC Sunday Night Theatre	Various	6 episodes
1956-63	ITV Television Playhouse	Various	10 episodes
1957-59	Hancock's Half Hour	Various	3 episodes
1957-64	ITV Play of the Week	Various	7 episodes
1958	Dial 999	Major Turner-Smith	Episode: "Old Soldiers Never Die"
1958-63	Boyd Q.C.	Mr. Gill/Col. Berringer	3 episodes
1959	The Flying Doctor	Dan	Episode: "Ear Witness"
1960	Probation Officer	Mr. Curtis	1 episode
1960	Bootsie and Snudge	Sir Hubert Smythe	Episode: "Smudge's School Friend"
1960	Danger Man	General Abeijon / Colonel Segur	2 episodes
1960	Maigret	Inspector Pyke	Episode: "The Revolver"
1960-62	Citizen James	Various	6 episodes
1960-63	BBC Sunday-Night Play	Various	2 episodes
1961	Armchair Theatre	Mr. Farber	Episode: "The Apprenticeship of Duddy Kravitz"
1961	The Edgar Wallace Mystery Theater	Hurley Brown	Episode: "Flat Two"
1961-63	Coronation Street	Edwin Mason	3 episodes
1962	Thirty-Minute Theatre	Wally	Episode: "The Little Gold Mine"
1962-66	The Saint	Insp. Claud Teal/William Fenton	2 episodes
1963	Zero One	Lopez	Episode: "Stopover"
1963	The Plane Makers	Jack Sefton	Episodes: "All Part of the Job"
1963	That's My Boy	Police Sergeant	Episode: "It's a Plant"
1963-67	The Avengers	George Stanley/Major B	2 episodes
1963-72	Comedy Playhouse	Sir Rufus/Police Constable	2 episodes
1964	Crane	George Lewis	Episode: "The Man With the Big Feet"
1965	Six Shades of Black	Lord Henn	Episode: "The Good Woman of Chester Square"
1965	Armchair Mystery Theatre	Sgt. Cosley	Episode: "Man and Mirror"
1965	Our Man at St. Mark's	Geoffrey Rushton	Episode: "Edie's Acre"
1965	The Flying Swan	Colonel	Episode: "The Waiting Time"
1965	The Wednesday Play	Norman	Episode: "The Bond"
1966	Take a Pair of Private Eyes	Inspector Roth	4 episodes
1966	Quick Before They Catch Us	Captain Happy	4 episodes
1966	Doctor Who	Sgt. Rugg/King of Hearts/Joey the Clown	Serial: "The Celestial Toymaker"
1967	The Forsyte Saga	Lomax	4 episodes
1967-69	The Newcomers	Henry Burroughs	Regular
1970	Please Sir!	Recruiting Sergeant "Banger" King	Episode: "Enter Mr. Sibley"
1971	On the Buses	Mr. Nichols	Episode: "The Lodger"
1971	Doctor at Large	Police Sergeant	Episode: "You've Really Landed Me In It This Time"
1971	The Last of the Baskets	Mr. Kershaw	Episode: "Do Unto Others"
1971	The Persuaders!	Porter	Episode: "The Time and the Place"
1971	The Troubleshooters	Brigadier Worthington	Episode: "Monopoly With Real Money"
1971-72	Z-Cars	George Appleton/Edwards	2 episodes
1972	His and Hers	George Shewin	Episode: "Engagement"
1972	Nearest and Dearest	Magistrate	Episode: "A Pair of Bloomers"
1972	My Wife Next Door	Mr. Edwards	Episode: "Joint Assignment"
1972-75	Dad's Army	Sir Charles McCallister/Major General Menzies	2 episodes
1973	Sykes	Inspector	2 episodes
1974	The Dick Emery Show		1 episode
1975	Dawson's Weekly	Colonel	Episode: "Les Miserables"
1975	Rising Damp	Flint	Episode: "The Last of the Big Spenders"
1975	Some Mothers Do 'Ave 'Em	Finney	Episode: "Learning to Drive"
