= The Septimus Wave =

The Septimus Wave (L'Onde Septimus)
- First edition (French)
- Date: May 8, 2015; 11 years ago
- Series: Blake and Mortimer
- Publisher: Cinebook (English)

Creative team
- Writers: Jean Dufaux
- Artists: Antoine Aubin, Etienne Schréder

Original publication
- Language: French

Translation
- Publisher: Cinebook Ltd

Chronology
- Preceded by: The Oath of the Five Lords
- Followed by: Plutarch's Staff

The Septimus Wave is the twenty-second book in the Blake and Mortimer series. It was written by Jean Dufaux, illustrated by Antoine Aubin and Etienne Schréder. The book is a sequel to The Yellow "M" and deals with Colonel Olrik's past with Septimus.

== Plot ==
In London, several months after the outcome of the case of the Yellow Mark, four admirers of Professor Septimus (Lieutenant McFarlane, Lady Rowana, banker Oscar Balley, and Professor Evangely) prepare to revive his work in secret. Lady Rowana is the first of two female protagonists to have a speaking part in Jacobs' publications. The second female protagonist would later appear in Edgar Jacobs' The Time Trap.

Olrik finds refuge in the Chinese establishment of Lilly Sing, where injects himself with morphine to forget his tormented past with Septimus. During one of his panic attacks, Olrik sees Professor Septimus demanding the return of his "guinea pig".

In the Centaur Club, Captain Francis Blake of MI5 is warned by his deputy Millovitch from the Home Office that a madman is wandering around King's Cross station. Blake and Millovitch, locate the madman before an electric shock suddenly strikes him. Meanwhile, Professor Philip Mortimer switches on the electric power in his laboratory in Newham, where he has rebuilt the Telecephaloscope that was invented by Septimus. Mortimer hopes to perfect the Telecephaloscope in order to use it for psychiatry. Mortimer's faithful servant, Nasir, disapproves of his plans for this machine. After Mortimer leaves the laboratory, the machine turns itself on and Nasir sees a disturbing shape emerging from it.

The next day, Blake gets furious when he learns about the nature of Mortimer's research. Busy with another matter, he asks the professor to accompany him to the interrogation of the first mad man found near King's Cross. They discover that he escaped from Bedlam Hospice, where Major Banks and his men were cared for. The mad man recites a litany and Mortimer recognizes the words as the litanies of Septimus' victims. Afterward, in the street, Blake and Mortimer are almost killed by a driver. Mortimer returns to his laboratory and Nasir tells him about the disturbing shape that he saw emerging underneath the machine: he saw Septimus' spectrum coming out of the Telecephaloscope. Meanwhile, Professor Septimus, who was brought back by the Telecephaloscope, quietly walks through Bloomsbury in search of his next test subject.

Kim Ku-Dum, a former interrogator of the Yellow Army, hypnotizes Olrik at Sing's place to help him break free of his demons. Olrik sees a crowd demanding the return of Septimus and Mortimer reactivating the Telecephaloscope. Motivated by these visions, Olrik tries to escape, but Sing is waiting outside to present him to Lieutenant McFarlane.

At Bedlam Hospice, Blake and Mortimer find Banks and his team rushing to prepare for an enemy attack. Blanks tells them that he sent two of his men to the abandoned hangars near King's Cross to find the mysterious machine. When Blake and Mortimer decide to leave, Banks and his men fall to their knees and start reciting the litany of Septimus. Blake decides to explore the basement of the abandoned warehouse near King's Cross in search of the machine, in which he discovers metal door. After opening it, Blake and his men enter a huge cave with a giant structure resembling a spaceship. Stepping into the craft, Blake suddenly finds himself in the reading room of the British Museum. Blake inspects the bookshelves and realizes that all of the books surrounding him are copies of "The Mega Wave" by Septimus. After touching one of the books, Blake is struck by an electric shock and falls to the floor. The British Museum suddenly vanishes and is replaced by a single glass column. Blake approaches the glass column and sees a scuba diver attached to the spaceship-like craft with wires and tubes staring back at him.

At the same moment, Mortimer takes a taxi to Lady Rowana, who invited him to attend a private party that included Septimus' four admirers. He discovers that they have also rebuilt a Telecephaloscope. The admirers reveal they have recovered Olrik as a test subject. Knowing their evil intentions, Mortimer damages the machine before being knocked out.

Meanwhile, Oscar Balley arrives late for the party. A horde of Septimuses march outside the warehouse looking for Olrik. Oscar is touched by one of the Septimuses outside, disappears in a cloud of thick smoke and Septimus appears in his place.

In their cell, Olrik and Mortimer decide to form a temporary alliance to escape, but Rowana releases them to show them the entirety of the situation. The professor makes the assumption that there is another mega wave generator that stimulated the Telecephaloscope, and that the image of Septimus, kept in memory, intends to replicate indefinitely. The horde of Septimuses break through the door and escape via the sewers. Mortimer takes Olrik to his lab in hopes of finding a way to end the phenomenon.

At 10 Downing Street, the Prime Minister tells Blake that the mysterious craft, Orpheus, was discovered by Major Banks' team during the last war and that its existence is to be kept a secret in order to facilitate a study by scientists. Blake decides to destroy the Orpheus and gets inside with explosives to disobey orders. In the laboratory, Mortimer uses the Telecephaloscope on Olrik to give him control over the Mega Wave, and thus over the source of the clones of Septimus. Olrik enters the spaceship via the Mega Wave and orders Blake and his men to leave. The diver tries to get control over the situation and keeps saying "Asylum". Olrik manages to resist the orders of the mysterious diver and triggers the explosion. The Orpheus ship explodes and disappears in a column of light. A few days later, Blake and Mortimer discuss their adventure, while Olrik (who has not recovered from his experience) finds himself interned in Bedlam Hospice with Major Blanks and his team. All repeat the same word as the diver: "Asylum".

== Reviews and sequel ==
On French media SensCritique, the album is rated 5.8/10. On Babelio, it has an average rating of 3.41/5.

Nice-Matin found the album to be very good, but HuffPost found it to be at a much lower level compared to The Yellow "M".

In January 2016, during an interview with journalist Yann Blake, Jean Dufaux announced that a sequel to this album had been written and will soon be published.

The sequel, an album titled Le Cri du Moloch (in French) and illustrated by Christian Cailleaux and Étienne Schréder, was published on November 20, 2020.
