= A Cry from the Streets =

1958 British film by Lewis Gilbert

- Theatrical release poster
- Directed by: Lewis Gilbert
- Written by: Vernon Harris; Novel: The Friend in Need by Elizabeth Coxhead
- Produced by: Ian Dalrymple
- Starring: Max Bygraves; Barbara Murray
- Cinematography: Harry Gillam
- Edited by: Peter Hunt
- Music by: Larry Adler
- Distributed by: Eros Films (UK); Tudor Pictures (USA)
- Release date: 12 August 1958 (UK)
- Running time: 99 minutes
- Country: United Kingdom
- Language: English
- Budget: £50,000

A Cry from the Streets is a 1958 British drama film directed by Lewis Gilbert, starring Max Bygraves and Barbara Murray. It was written by Vernon Harris based on the 1957 novel The Friend in Need by Elizabeth Coxhead.

== Plot ==
When a man is hanged for murdering his wife, their three small children go into social care. Bill is an electrician with the local care home, and is introduced to the children and their social worker, Ann. Growing ever fonder of the kids, he and Ann take them out on trips and picnics, to try to bring some happiness back into their lives. However, events spiral out of control when a child gets hold of a loaded gun.

== Cast ==
- Max Bygraves as Bill Lowther
- Barbara Murray as Ann Fairlie
- Colin Petersen as Georgie
- Dana Wilson as Barbie
- Kathleen Harrison as Mrs. Farrer
- Sean Barrett as Don Farrer
- Mona Washbourne as Mrs. Daniels
- Eleanor Summerfield as Gloria
- Toke Townley as Mr. Daniels
- Avice Landone as Rachel Seymour
- Fred Griffiths as Mr. Hodges
- John Moulder-Brown as Jacky (uncredited)
- Dandy Nichols as Mrs. Jenks (uncredited)
- Gillian Vaughan as Sally Percival (uncredited)

== Production ==
Lewis Gilbert said he went to Eros asking to make a film with Max Bygraves for £60,000. They agreed if it could be made for £50,000, without reading the script, because they knew they would be able to see a Bygraves film profitably at that price.

The movie was originally called A Friend in Need and was made for Gilbert's own company.

The movie features two Australian child stars, Colin Petersen from Smiley and The Scamp and Dana Wilson from The Shiralee.

Bygraves wrote in his memoirs that Lewis Gilbert was the most sensitive director he worked with adding "I honestly believe that could I have had his direction for a few more movies, I could have been a good screen actor. He was the only director that would come up to me before a take and say things like: “In this next scene you are bloody well annoyed—you feel like telling the matron to get stuffed—but with the kids looking on you daren’t, so you bottle it up and just nod ‘Yes’.”

== Reception ==
=== Box office ===
Kinematograph Weekly listed it as being "in the money" at the British box office in 1958 and "a real winner".

Variety listed it as one of the twelve most popular films of the year.

=== Critical reception ===
Variety called it "a refreshing little film with the golden ingredient of heart."

The Monthly Film Bulletin wrote: "This film's heart is so firmly in the right place that it seems ungracious to carp. Yet it never really faces the problems it poses. What, for instance, does one tell a child whose father has killed her mother, or a small boy whose mother has just committed suicide? Elizabeth Coxhead's book may have attempted an answer, but the film does not. Interest is spread among so many groups of people that there is no time for real character development, and the melodramatic climax is out of key with the rest of the story. Nevertheless, there is a warmly human atmosphere in this film and the superficially happy ending is not allowed to obscure the fact that there are still deprived children in need of help. ...Max Bygraves has a relaxed style and genuine charm, and it is pleasant to see an ordinary young working man believably played. But his integrity serves only to emphasize the theatrical posturing of Barabara Murray, who gives a cold and artificial performance in a part that calls for generous impulsiveness."

The New York Times wrote "this inquiry into the lives of some of the orphaned and homeless youngsters in a municipal children's shelter is realistic, bittersweet drama played with compassion and insight. Although it sometimes waxes melodramatic, it gently tugs at the heartstrings and, now and again, tickles the funnybone only as guileless kids can."

Leslie Halliwell wrote: "Mildly pleasing but unconvincing semi-documentary, with children competing with the star at scene-stealing"

Filmink wrote "it’s skilfully made by Gilbert, Bygraves is charming, and Petersen and Wilson are terrific."

=== Accolades ===
The film was entered into the 1st Moscow International Film Festival, and Vernon Harris's screenplay received a BAFTA nomination.
