= Brian Reece =

English actor (1913–1962)

- Reece in A Case for PC 49 (1951)
- Born: 24 July 1913; Wallasey, Cheshire, England
- Died: 12 April 1962 (aged 48); London, England

Brian Reece (24 July 1913 – 12 April 1962) was an English actor.

== Biography ==
Born in Wallasey, Cheshire, he starred as the eponymous policeman in the BBC radio series PC49. His films include Orders Are Orders (1954), A Case for PC 49 (1951), Geordie (1955) and Carry On Admiral (1957). On stage, he appeared in Bless The Bride (1947), Bet Your Life (1952) with Julie Wilson and Arthur Askey. He appeared twice as a castaway on the BBC Radio programme Desert Island Discs, first on 24 July 1953. and again on 17 April 1961.

In 1955 he appeared at Aldwych Theatre in the farce Man Alive! by John Dighton.

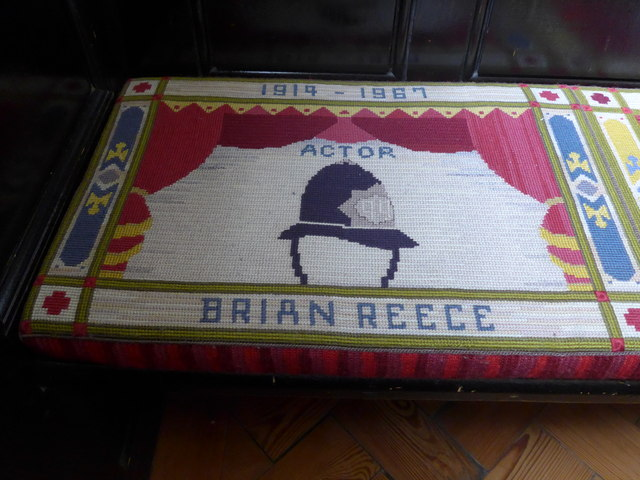
Pew cushion in St Anne's Church, Kew dedicated to Brian Reece, showing the distinctive helmet he wore when playing PC 49. The dates are incorrect.

Reece lived from 1948 until 1953 at No. 59 Strand-on-the-Green, in West London. He sometimes worshipped at St Anne's Church, Kew and there is a pew cushion in the church dedicated to him, although it shows his dates incorrectly.

Reece died in London, aged 48.

== Selected filmography ==
- A Case for PC 49 (1951)
