= Jeremy Spenser =

British actor (born 1937)

- Born: 16 July 1937 (age 88); London, England, United Kingdom
- Other name: Jeremy John Dornhurst de Saram
- Occupation: Film actor
- Years active: 1948–1967
- Relatives: David Spenser (brother)

Jeremy Spenser (born Jeremy John Dornhurst de Saram; 16 July 1937) is a British actor who is widely known for his work in film and television from the late 1940s to the mid 1960s. He made his screen debut aged 11 in Anna Karenina (1948).

The following year he played in the black comedy Kind Hearts and Coronets as the young Louis Mazzini. He played the young King Nicolas in The Prince and the Showgirl with Laurence Olivier and Marilyn Monroe and in Ferry to Hong Kong with Orson Welles.

In the 1960s, the role offers began to slow down. His last film role was in 1966's Fahrenheit 451 directed by François Truffaut, after which Spenser retired from acting.

Some of his notable film credits include Term of Trial (1962), and The Informers (1963).

== Personal life ==
Jeremy Spenser is the brother of British actor, director, producer and writer David Spenser.

== Selected filmography ==
- Anna Karenina (1948) - Giuseppe
- Kind Hearts and Coronets (1949) - Young Louis (uncredited)
- The Spider and the Fly (1949) - Jacques, boy in church
- Prelude to Fame (1950) - Guido Ferugia
- The Dancing Years (1950) - Maria's Son
- Portrait of Clare (1950) - Steven Hingston
- Appointment with Venus (1951) - Georges
- The Planter's Wife (1952) - Mat
- Background (1953) - Adrian Lomax
- Devil on Horseback (1954) - Moppy Parfitt
- The Man Who Loved Redheads (1955) - Young Mark
- Summertime (1955) - Vito de Rossi
- Escapade (1955) - L. W. Daventry
- It's Great to Be Young (1956) - Nicky, The Angel Hill Kids
- The Prince and the Showgirl (1957) - King Nicolas
- Wonderful Things! (1958) - Mario
- Ferry to Hong Kong (1959) - Miguel Henriques, 1st Officer
- The Roman Spring of Mrs. Stone (1961) - Young man
- The Brain (1962) - Martin Holt
- King and Country (1964) - Private Sparrow
- Operation Crossbow (1965) - SS Officer at Rocket Plant (uncredited)
- He Who Rides a Tiger (1965) - The Panda
- Fahrenheit 451 (1966) - Man with the Apple

== Bibliography ==
- John Holmstrom, The Moving Picture Boy: An International Encyclopaedia from 1895 to 1995, Norwich, Michael Russell, 1996, p. 204.
