= Betty Ann Davies =

British actress (1910–1955)

- Born: 24 December 1910; London, UK
- Died: 14 May 1955 (aged 44); Manchester, UK
- Occupation: Actress
- Years active: 1934–1955

Betty Ann Davies (24 December 1910 – 14 May 1955) was a British stage and film actress active from the 1920s to the 1950s.

Davies made her first stage appearance at the Palladium in a revue in 1924. The following year she joined Cochran's Young Ladies in revues such as One Dam Thing After Another and This Year of Grace. Davies enjoyed a long and distinguished West End career which included The Good Companions (1934), The Morning Star (1942), Blithe Spirit (1943) and Four Winds (1953). Her outstanding stage triumph was in the role of Blanche du Bois, which she took over from Vivien Leigh, in the original West End production of A Streetcar Named Desire. Davies appeared in 38 films, most notably as the future Mrs Polly in The History of Mr. Polly and in the first of the St Trinian's films The Belles of St. Trinian's, and was active in TV at the end of her career.

Davies went into hospital on 14 May 1955 to have an operation for appendicitis, but suffered from complications following surgery and died the same day. She was 44. She left one son, Brook Blackford.

== Partial filmography ==
- My Old Duchess (1934) - Sally Martin
- Death at Broadcasting House (1934) - Poppy Levine
- Youthful Folly (1934)
- Joy Ride (1935) - Anne Maxwell
- Play Up the Band (1935) - Betty Small
- Excuse My Glove (1936) - Ann Haydon
- She Knew What She Wanted (1936) - Frankie
- Chick (1936) - Peggy
- Radio Lover (1936) - Wendy Maradyck
- Tropical Trouble (1936) - Mary Masterman
- Lucky Jade (1937) - Betsy
- Merry Comes to Town (1937) - Marjorie Stafford
- Under a Cloud (1937) - Diana Forbes
- Silver Top (1938) - Dushka Vernon
- Mountains O'Mourne (1938) - Violet Mayfair
- Kipps (1941) - Flo Bates
- It Always Rains on Sunday (1947) - Sadie, his wife
- Escape (1948) - Girl in Park
- To the Public Danger (1948, Short) - Barmaid
- The Passionate Friends (1949) - Miss Joan Layton
- The History of Mr. Polly (1949) - Miriam Larkins Polly
- Now Barabbas (1949) - Rosie
- The Man in Black (1950) - Bertha Clavering
- The Blue Lamp (1950) - Mary Bertha Lewis (uncredited)
- Trio (1950) - Mrs. Helen Chester (segment "Sanatorium")
- The Woman with No Name (1950) - Beatrice
- Outcast of the Islands (1951) - Mrs. Willems
- Meet Me Tonight (1952) - Doris Gow (segment "Fumed Oak: An Unpleasant Comedy")
- Cosh Boy (1953) - Elsie
- Grand National Night (1953) - Pinkie Collins
- Gilbert Harding Speaking of Murder (1953) - Selina
- Murder by Proxy (1954) - Mrs. Alicia Brunner
- The Belles of St. Trinian's (1954) - Miss Waters
- Children Galore (1955) - Mrs. Ark
- Alias John Preston (1955) - Mrs. Sandford
