= Ferry to Hong Kong =

- Original UK quad by Brian Bysouth
- Directed by: Lewis Gilbert
- Written by: Lewis Gilbert; Vernon Harris
- Based on: novel by Simon Kent (Max Catto)
- Produced by: George Maynard
- Starring: Curt Jürgens; Orson Welles; Sylvia Syms; Jeremy Spenser
- Cinematography: Otto Heller
- Edited by: Peter R. Hunt
- Music by: Kenneth V. Jones
- Production company: Rank Organisation
- Distributed by: Rank Film Distributors (UK); 20th Century Fox (US)
- Release date: 2 July 1959
- Running time: 112 minutes
- Country: United Kingdom
- Language: English
- Budget: £500,000 or £550,000

Ferry to Hong Kong is a 1959 British melodrama/adventure film directed by Lewis Gilbert and starring Curt Jürgens, Sylvia Syms, Orson Welles and Jeremy Spenser. It was written by Gilbert and Vernon Harris.

Lewis Gilbert later described Ferry to Hong Kong as "my nightmare film". Orson Welles, he said, "never cared about his fellow actors, never cared about the director". Gilbert says "everything was wrong with the film – principally Orson Welles".

The film became a famous disaster in the history of the Rank Organisation.

== Plot ==
Mark Conrad, a debonair Anglo-Austrian former playboy and junk owner, now an alcoholic down-and-out, is expelled from Hong Kong. He is placed on an ancient ferry boat, the Fa Tsan (known to its crew as the Fat Annie), despite the protests of the pompous owner, Captain Cecil Hart.

He travels to Macau, but is refused entry for the same reason he was expelled from Hong Kong. He engages the captain in a card game and wins the right to 'live' on board. His charming manner endears him to the crew and to an attractive teacher Liz Ferrers, a regular passenger.

The ferry is nearly wrecked in a typhoon, but Conrad wrests command from the cowardly and drunken captain and saves the ship. Drifting out of control near the Chinese coast, they are boarded by pirates, led by Chinese-American Johnny Sing-up. Sing-up reveals that Hart is a former conman who won the ship in a crooked card-game.

Conrad becomes a hero when he saves the ship, and is allowed to stay in Hong Kong. He is tempted to continue his budding relationship with Liz, but decides to resist it until he has 'beaten the dragon'.

== Cast ==
- Curt Jürgens as Mark Bertram Conrad
- Orson Welles as Captain Cecil Hart
- Sylvia Syms as Miss Liz Ferrers
- Jeremy Spenser as Miguel Henriques, 1st Officer
- Noel Purcell as Joe Skinner, ship's engineer
- Margaret Withers as Miss Carter
- John Wallace as Hong Kong Police Inspector
- Roy Chiao as Johnny Sing-up
- Shelley Shen as Foo Soo
- Louis Seto as Tommy Cheng
- Milton Reid as Yen, Sing-Up's Partner

== Production ==
=== Development ===
The film was based on a 1957 novel by Simon Kent. Director Lewis Gilbert says the film rights to the novel were originally owned by Sydney Box who offered the project to Gilbert; the director agreed provided he had complete creative control. "I was probably a bit egotistical around then," recalled Gilbert "I'd had six pictures that were very successful." According to Gilbert, Sydney Box had nothing to do with the final movie, which was financed by Rank.

John Mortimer worked on the script. The film was among a number of movies made by Rank in the late 1950s aimed at the international market, involving colour and location filming. Rank had rationalised its film production arm, decreasing overall output but putting more money in a certain number of films. Rank chairman John Davis said: "It is vital that the greatest possible financial encouragement should be given to the making of important films: for these the public will gladly pay. The emphasis will be on the more expensive and important film." According to actor Donald Sinden, who was under contract to Rank:

The story went round Pinewood that Davis looked over the biggest successes of the past five years and deduced that they had an exotic title, an American leading man and a continental director ... he decided these were the elements which make a successful film and he came up with The Ferry to Hong Kong ... it was a dire flop!

=== Casting ===
In August 1958 Rank announced it was going to make Ferry to Hong Kong starring Peter Finch. The following month it was reported the film would star Finch and Burl Ives. According to Gilbert, the stars were going to be Finch (as the tramp), German actor Curt Jurgens (the sea captain) and Sylvia Syms (the school teacher). A number of Rank movies had German stars around this time – Tiger Bay, Bachelor of Hearts, Whirlpool – as the German market was seen as very important. It was a number of international films Jurgens was appearing in.

Gilbert claims Finch then had "some sort of row" with John Davis who took the actor off the film. According to Gilbert, Davis saw Orson Welles in The Long Hot Summer, "fell in love with him" and insisted Welles star in the movie. Since Gilbert had already signed Jurgens to star in the film, Davis suggested he play the tramp and Welles the sea captain. In September 1958 Variety reported the casting as a swap between Finch and Jurgens, stating:

Though Finch is one of Rank’s biggest stars he has been dropped because of Rank’s new policy. This Is to crash the world market with top international stars. Jurgens is regarded as a bigger draw than Finch at the moment. It is also part of the Rank policy of wooing the German market.

Jurgen's fee was a reported £55,000. The original title of the movie was Night Ferry to Hong Kong. It had one of the largest budgets in the history of Rank.

=== Shooting ===
The film was shot entirely on location in Hong Kong. "None of us had ever been to Hong Kong before, and setting out to produce an entire film here presented fantastic problems," said producer George Maynard. “The casting was a problem, because we found many local people had a marked reluctance to get into movies. Which was rather a change from conditions at home.”

"Because we are using so many people in the film it would have been impossible to take them all back to Britain," said associate producer John Dark. "And we needed to do it this way to achieve the reality we aiming for.” Lewis Gilbert agreed, “To construct our boat alone in England would have needed an enormous amount of space and money. And even then we could never have reproduced some of the spectacular effects we've been able to achieve by shooting on the spot.”

Filming started 10 November 1958.

Orson Welles later told Peter Bogdanovich he only agreed to do the movie if it was turned into a comedy. The actor said this led to clashes with Jurgens who played the material straight while Welles played it as a farce.

Gilbert says he knew the film was in trouble when he met Welles who told him the film was a comedy. He confirms Welles and Jurgens "hated each other", claiming Welles disliked Jurgens because of his looks, popularity and the fact he was German, and thought Jurgens hated Welles because he was jealous of Welles' reputation. According to Gilbert, the poor relationship between the lead two actors meant he had trouble getting them in the same shot. The director says Welles insisted on wearing a false nose and at one point held up filming for two days while he could find his nose. Gilbert says Welles hated acting and it was a "battle to get him on the floor" every day.

Welles' daughter Chris confirmed in her memoir that "When I got up the nerve to ask him [Orson Welles] about Ferry to Hong Kong, he sighed and said it was a terrible movie, he hated his part, and he had agreed to it only because he was desperate for money."

In Hong Kong, the production team bought a boat that could be converted into a paddle steamer and used local labour to build a full-sized studio stage and crane for the CinemaScope camera. The film was shot with guide tracks and every line of dialogue was re-recorded and re-synched in Pinewood.

== Release ==
In December 1959 it was announced the film would be part of a package of seven Rank films that would be distributed in the US by 20th Century Fox in a deal worth $2 million.

== Reception ==
=== Box office ===
In August 1959 Kinematograph Weekly reported the film "isn’t doing too badly" at the box office "but, let's face it, something more sensational was expected of such an extravagant and widely publicised job."

Gilbert says the film "didn't do too badly" in France and Germany but flopped in England and America.

=== Critical ===
The film received bad reviews in England.

Kinematograph Weekly wrote "A somewhat aimless course is steered for the first hour, but once the reasons for its central characters’ inhibitions are made clear it rapidly builds up to an exciting climax. Penultimate spectacle, relieved by popular sentiment and warm humorous touches, offsets Orson Welles's incredibly hammy performance as the skipper and, at the same time, puts the overall within reach of the big money."

The Los Angeles Times called it "a very funny comedy-drama".

Variety said "the most fascinating aspect of this slice of meller-hokum is the way Orson Welles has clearly conned director Lewis Gilbert; Welles seems to have been allowed to write his own dialog and give his own interpretation of his role. He might just as well have taken, over direction. The result is a piece of hammy; over-acting which might have been fun for a few minutes. But, carried on for around two hours remorselessly, it becomes grotesque arid; in the end a boring, caricature."

Filmink called it "a complete turkey with Syms having to act her arse off to convince us that she’s attracted to sweaty, tubby Curt Jurgens." The same magazine said Welles " gives a truly horrendous hammy performance here, sending the whole film up and wrecking the story in the process – and Jurgens isn’t much better. A huge flop: the greatest failure in the career of director Lewis Gilbert and one of the greatest in the history of Rank."
