= Friends (1971 film) =

1971 British film by Lewis Gilbert

- Directed by: Lewis Gilbert
- Written by: Vernon Harris Jack Russell
- Story by: Lewis Gilbert
- Produced by: Lewis Gilbert
- Starring: Sean Bury; Anicée Alvina
- Cinematography: Andréas Winding
- Edited by: Anne V. Coates
- Music by: Elton John; Paul Buckmaster; Bernie Taupin
- Production company: Lewis Gilbert Productions
- Distributed by: Paramount British Pictures
- Release date: 24 March 1971 (United States)
- Running time: 101 minutes
- Country: United Kingdom
- Language: English
- Budget: $500,000

Friends is a 1971 British-French teen-romance film directed and produced by Lewis Gilbert and written by Gilbert, Vernon Harris and Jack Russell. The soundtrack, with music composed by Elton John and Paul Buckmaster and lyrics written by Bernie Taupin, was released as John's Friends album, and John's recording of the title selection charted when released as a single in the United States.

== Plot ==
Neglected 15-year-old English boy Paul Harrison, living in Paris with his wealthy businessman father, befriends an orphaned 14-year-old French girl named Michelle Latour who has recently arrived in Paris to live with her cousin. However, Michelle finds the situation in her cousin's Montmartre apartment to be disturbingly unwholesome.

Together, Paul and Michelle decide to run away. They travel to the idyllic marshlands of the Camargue where Michelle has a very small cottage to which she and her recently deceased artist father periodically escaped from their home in Arles. Paul and Michelle settle into the house, become lovers, have a baby and play at being responsible adults. Along the way, they each discover many of the troubles of family life.

The couple's adventure ends when the police finally find Paul and Michelle.

=== Sequel ===
In the 1974 sequel, Paul and Michelle, the young family has been reunited, and Paul must cope with not only Michelle's new love interest but also the difficulties that he faces balancing work, college and family.

== Cast ==
- Sean Bury as Paul Harrison
- Anicée Alvina as Michelle Latour
- Ronald Lewis as Mr. Robert Harrison (father of Paul)
- Toby Robins as Mrs. Gardner
- Joan Hickson as Lady in Bookshop
- Pascale Roberts as Annie
- Sady Rebbot as Pierre

== Production ==
Director Lewis Gilbert had a lucrative contract with Paramount at the time after the success of Alfie. He had just made The Adventurers for the studio and turned down The Godfather because they would not give him enough of a budget to make the movie the way he wanted. Instead, Gilbert pitched a new project to Robert Evans, head of the studio: Morning Noon and Night, containing three love stories, one about two children, one about two middle aged people, one about two old people. When Evans read Gilbert's treatment about the young people he suggested they make the film just concentrating on them and Gilbert agreed.

The two leads were found after extensive screen testing. Gilbert wanted to cast Isabelle Adjani for the first but was unable to get her. It was a rare feature film part for Ronald Lewis in the 1970s.

== Reception ==
=== Box office ===
Gilbert had a percentage of the gross - 50% of the film after it made two and a half times its cost. He was offered all the takings from England and Japan instead of a percentage but decided to keep the percentage. Gilbert says the film did reasonably well in the US, poorly in England but was a huge success in Japan, making over a million dollars. The film also did particularly well in Mexico and Italy.

=== Awards ===
The film was nominated for a Golden Globe Award for Best English-Language Foreign Film at the 1972 Golden Globe Awards. It was also nominated for a Best Original Score Written for a Motion Picture at the 1972 Grammy Awards.

=== Critics ===
Roger Ebert awarded the film a one-star rating, heavily criticizing it for its portrayal of teenage sex: "The archness of their 'innocence' toward sex is, finally, just plain dirty. And the worst thing is that the movie seems to like it that way." Gene Siskel of the Chicago Tribune also gave the film one star and called it "a saccharine story" that teases the payoff of the two characters sleeping together until "the audience are made to feel like Peeping Toms." Arthur D. Murphy of Variety agreed and found the film's plot "requires a sensitive adult mind" but "lacks by a wide margin the requisite treatment, more often than not being patronizingly voyeuristic." Howard Thompson of The New York Times called the film "rather exasperating" until the "deeply touching finale" when it finally makes its point about pure love with the birth of the baby. Brenda Davies of The Monthly Film Bulletin wrote that producer-director Gilbert "sometimes seems to be inviting guffaws rather than sympathy. The story itself is riddled with improbabilities, and the dialogue seems out of touch with the contemporary teenage idiom." Anicée Alvina, however, was singled out by Davies for praise as an actress with "an alarmingly precocious charm, and she manages to survive the most embarrassing situations with aplomb."

Kevin Thomas of the Los Angeles Times wrote a positive review, calling Friends "a film of rare tenderness and charm" with "winning performances" from both leads. Scott Murray, writing for Senses of Cinema in 2005, challenged the largely negative critical reception to Friends. He believed that the movie's greatest strength was "its evocation of Arcadia, that magic, protected place where life may be lived as the rest of us can only dream."
