= Joy Ride (1935 film) =

- Cynthia Stock, Gene Gerrard and Zelma O'Neal in the film
- Directed by: Harry Hughes
- Written by: Vernon Harris; Harry Hughes
- Produced by: Basil Humphrys
- Starring: Gene Gerrard; Zelma O'Neal; Betty Ann Davies
- Cinematography: Ronald Neame
- Edited by: E.G Richards
- Music by: Eric Spear
- Production company: City Film Corporation
- Distributed by: Associated British Film Distributors
- Release date: 16 December 1935
- Running time: 78 minutes
- Country: United Kingdom
- Language: English

Joy Ride is a 1935 British comedy film directed by Harry Hughes and starring Gene Gerrard, Zelma O'Neal and Betty Ann Davies. It was written by Vernon Harris and Hughes, and made at the Nettlefold Studios in Walton. The film's art direction was by Don Russell.

== Plot ==
Bill and Dippy are out on a joy ride with cabaret girls Virgy and Anne, when the car breaks down. Seeking refuge at the country mansion of their uncle, Admiral Sir Aubrey Mutch-Twistleton, his wife Lady Clara demands an explanation. Bill tells her he found Virgy wandering in the grounds suffering from amnesia. Meanwhile Anne, who has been for a walk, bangs her head and actually loses her memory. Humorous complications follow.

== Cast ==
- Gene Gerrard as Bill Shepherd
- Zelma O'Neal as Virgy Maxwell
- Betty Ann Davies as Anne Maxwell
- Paul Blake as Dippy Shepherd
- Gus McNaughton as String
- Violet Vanbrugh as Jennie the Duchess
- Cynthia Stock as Selina Prune
- Charles Sewell as Sir Aubrey Mutch-Twistleton
- Amy Veness as Lady Clara Mutch-Twistleton
- W.G. Saunders as Bishop
- The Buddy Bradley Rhythm Girls as nightclub dancers
- Jeanne d'Arcy as Miss Ainsworth
- Molly Hamley-Clifford as Flossie
- Vernon Harris as Mr. Wilkins
- Robert MacLachlan as Sir Thomas Sellaby
- Bryan Powley as Angus MacGregor
- Ian Wilson as Tommy

== Reception ==
Kine Weekly wrote: "Simple in its plot, but happy in its choice of players and picturesque in its setting. The artless fooling is productive of a steady stream of laughs, and the atmosphere is most congenial. If, in spite of its star values and resourceful team work, the picture is hardly strong enough to stand on its own feet in all situations, it is admirably equipped for the average two-feature programme."

The Daily Film Renter wrote: "Betty Davies takes honours with clever comedy performance, Gene Gerrard and Zelma O'Neal making attractive leads. Good popular booking anywhere. Acting honours are annexed with ease by Betty Davies, who brings a wealth of comedy talent to the difficult role of Anne. Possessed of a definitely pleasing personality, this newcomer is obviously destined for a promising future.

Picture Show wrote: "A farce comedy ... Gene Gerrard and Paul Blake as Bill and Dippy respectively, are most amusing. Zelma O'Neal as Virgy is good. Betty Davies is also responsible for some excellent humour. The remainder of the long cast are good. An amusing picture."
