= Emergency Call (1952 film) =

1952 British film by Lewis Gilbert

- Theatrical release poster
- Directed by: Lewis Gilbert
- Written by: Lewis Gilbert; Vernon Harris
- Produced by: Ernest G. Roy
- Starring: Jack Warner; Anthony Steel; Joy Shelton; Sid James
- Cinematography: Wilkie Cooper
- Edited by: Charles Hasse
- Music by: Wilfred Burns
- Production company: Nettlefold Films
- Distributed by: Butcher's Film Service
- Release date: 24 May 1952
- Running time: 84 minutes
- Country: United Kingdom
- Language: English
- Budget: £20,000

Emergency Call, released in the US as The Hundred Hour Hunt, is a 1952 British drama film directed by Lewis Gilbert and starring Jack Warner, Anthony Steel, Joy Shelton and Sid James. It was written by Gilbert and Vernon Harris, and distributed by Butcher's Film Service. The film was a noted success compared to its small budget and helped establish Gilbert as a director. It was remade in 1962 as Emergency.

== Plot ==
The film centres around a race against the clock to locate three blood donors each able to donate one pint of a rare type of blood to save the life of a young girl suffering from leukaemia. The doctor in charge of treating the girl enlists the assistance of police officer Inspector Lane in order to assist in the search for suitable donors. The three donors are each from very different backgrounds, a white boxer, a black sailor, and finally a murderer who has been on the run from the police for a number of years. The boxer's donation is fairly straightforward, having only to avoid his manager, the sailor's donation is more complicated, following a war-time incident where a dying Nazi soldier refused to accept his offer of a donation which he attributes to racism, he initially refuses to donate, until it is explained to him that the Nazi officer refused his donation for reasons that can be attributed to the Nazi's master race ideology.

The final donor is a murderer on the run from the police, living under an assumed name. The police eventually locate the man and he suffers a gunshot injury. He must choose to donate the last pint of blood needed and die at the scene from blood loss, or to refuse to donate in order to receive treatment in hospital but with the knowledge he will surely be found guilty of murder at trial and sentenced to death. The criminal chooses to donate and the young girl survives.

== Cast ==
- Jack Warner as Inspector Lane
- Anthony Steel as Dr. Carter
- Joy Shelton as Laura Bishop
- Sid James as Danny Marks
- Earl Cameron as George Robinson
- John Robinson as Dr. Braithwaite
- Thora Hird as Mrs. Cornelius
- Eric Pohlmann as Flash Harry
- Sydney Tafler as Brett
- Geoffrey Hibbert as Jackson
- Henry Hewitt as Mr. Wilberforce
- Vida Hope as Brenda
- Avis Scott as Marie
- Freddie Mills as Tim Mahoney
- Peggy Bryan as Ward Sister
- Bruce Seton as Sergeant Bellamy
- Anna Turner as Mrs. Jackson
- Nosher Powell as Boy Booth
- Campbell Singer as Sergeant Phillips
- Nigel Clarke as Superintendent Travers
- Iris Vandeleur as Mrs. Flint

== Production ==
It was shot at Nettlefold Studios with sets designed by the art director Bernard Robinson.

Both Warner and Steel were loaned out from the Rank Organisation; the two men worked together again with Gilbert on Abert RN (1953) Real life boxer Freddie Mills played a boxer.

== Critical reception ==
The Monthly Film Bulletin wrote: "The usual demands of a thriller seldom exceed a logical, yet sufficiently involved plot, told with economy, swiftness and the use of a natural crescendo of excitement. This film, notwithstanding its unlikely and complex plot and the uneven pace, still adds up to a fairly exciting ninety minutes. Slick production and good photography, however, do not excuse the stereotyped characterisation, which is particularly trite and objectionable in the case of Anthony Steel and Joy Shelton. Jack Warner's performance is sound, and Freddie Mills contributes some effective fight sequences."

Variety said "story strikes an original note and the idea is neatly exploited in the script."

The Radio Times Guide to Films gave the film 2/5 stars, writing: "A small child with a rare blood type needs a transfusion to pull through a critical operation, and the only donors available are a boxer at a career crossroads, a black sailor with attitude and a killer on the run. Director Lewis Gilbert takes this cliché-ridden mishmash and moulds it into a mildly diverting drama."

In British Sound Films: The Studio Years 1928–1959 David Quinlan rated the film as "good", writing: "Economicall thriller keeps going quite well."

Leslie Halliwell said: "Now a boringly predictable collection of mild anecdotes, but then rather a smart idea, much better executed than one would normally expect from Britains's Poverty Row."
