= Cosh Boy =

1953 British film by Lewis Gilbert

- Directed by: Lewis Gilbert
- Screenplay by: Lewis Gilbert; Vernon Harris
- Based on: play Master Crook by Bruce Walker
- Produced by: Daniel M. Angel
- Starring: James Kenney; Joan Collins
- Cinematography: Jack Asher
- Edited by: Charles Hasse
- Music by: Lambert Williamson
- Production company: Daniel Angel Films
- Distributed by: Romulus (UK); Lippert (US)
- Release date: 4 March 1953
- Running time: 75 minutes
- Country: United Kingdom
- Language: English
- Budget: £38,537
- Box office: £112,918 (UK)

Cosh Boy (also known as The Tough Guy; U.S. title: The Slasher) is a 1953 British film noir directed by Lewis Gilbert and starring James Kenney and Joan Collins. It was written by Gilbert and Vernon Harris based on the play Master Crook by Bruce Walker. It was made at Riverside Studios in Hammersmith.

== Plot ==
Led by 16-year-old Roy Walsh, a post-war London street gang specializes in snatching women's purses. They use their membership in a boys' club as cover. During a club-sponsored dance, Roy meets Rene, the sister of one of his gang. Over time, Rene submits to his sexual advances. Later, upon visiting a doctor, Rene learns she's pregnant. She tells Roy, who wants nothing more to do with her. Rene then attempts suicide. Meantime, Roy's mother, Elsie Walsh is seeing Bob Stevens. He urges Elsie to marry him. That way, he can take Roy "in hand." Sensing this new authority, Roy harbours outright hatred for Bob.

Bob is assistant manager at the Palindrome dance hall. One evening, Roy's gang rob the Palindrome's box-office take. During the heist, Roy shoots a staff member, wounding him seriously. Later that night in a hospital, Rene's mother witnesses her daughter's recovery from her suicide attempt. She then travels to Elsie's flat with a mob of concerned women, shouting for her to produce Roy. Then Bob arrives. He urges Rene's mother to go home. Next, he kicks in the door to Roy's bedroom, where the boy has taken refuge. Bob decides to give Roy a sound thrashing – for his own good. The police arrive next, just as Bob is brandishing his belt in readiness. Bob lets them in, and in reply to their enquiry as to his identity, he says he's the boy's stepfather, having just married his mother Elsie that morning.

The senior officer congratulates him. Then, seeing the belt in Bob's hand, he smiles, suggesting to his colleague they arrest another gang member and come back for Roy later. Bob begins thrashing Roy as the scene cuts outside and a mob of women listening to Roy's cries and shrieks for help. The detectives walk away silently, into the night.

== Historical context ==
In England in the early 1950s, male youths in post-World War II delinquent gangs who wore stylised Edwardian-era fashion were initially known as 'cosh boys', and 'Edwardians', but later became better known as 'Teddy Boys' after a 23 September 1953 Daily Express newspaper headline shortened Edwardian to Teddy.

== Cast ==
- James Kenney as Roy Walsh
- Joan Collins as Rene Collins
- Betty Ann Davies as Elsie Walsh
- Robert Ayres as Bob Stevens
- Hermione Baddeley as Mrs. Collins
- Hermione Gingold as Queenie
- Nancy Roberts as Gran Walsh
- Laurence Naismith as Inspector Donaldson
- Ian Whittaker as Alfie Collins
- Stanley Escane as Pete
- Michael McKeag as Brian
- Sean Lynch as Darky
- Johnny Briggs as Skinny Johnson
- Edward Evans as Sergeant Woods
- Cameron Hall as Mr. Beverley
- Sid James as Police Sergeant
- Frederick Piper as Mr Easter
- Anthony Oliver as doctor
- Arthur Howard as Registrar (uncredited)
- Toke Townley as Mr. Smith (uncredited)
- Walter Hudd as Magistrate (uncredited)

== Production ==
The film was based on the play Master Crook by Bruce Walker which had been originally titled Cosh Boy. It debuted at the Embassy in 1951 starring James Kenney. The Spectator said "its rough, crude taste is shockingly welcome" and praised the third act for its "highly unpleasant, undeniably effective, melodramatic tension." Variety called it "a strong piece of melodrama."

The film was financed by the Woolf Brothers.

Joan Collins called it "a shop girl’s melodrama and the public loved it. I enjoyed working with Jimmy and all the other young actors. The director, Lewis Gilbert, was adorable to me, and good to work with."

== Release ==
It was among the first British films to receive the new X certificate.

The film was banned in Birmingham. It was also refused permission to be shown in Australia. It was given a Certificate rating of 16 in Norway (1953), and banned in Sweden.

The film's release coincided with the trial of Derek Bentley and some media linked the film to Bentley's crimes. "Today you'd show it to 10 year olds", Lewis Gilbert commented in 2000.

== Reception ==
=== Critical ===
Variety said the film was "bound to attract undue controversy" wherever it was screened and felt American audiences would have trouble understanding the accents.

The Monthly Film Bulletin said the film "can justly be accused of sensationalism. The characters are all stereotypes and in no way arouse the warmth of pity or indignation.... this film may provide plenty of ammunition to those who blame the screen for the incidence of juvenile delinquency. The awfulness of the crimes committed by the young thugs in the film is in no way emphasised and the excitement of conspiracy and chase is given a glamour which is in no way dimmed by the "nice" atmosphere of the youth club scenes and the puerility of the social workers, who can apparently be so easily duped. The performance of James Kenney and some good location work are the best points of the film... Joan Collins as the misused young girl is badly miscast."

The Los Angeles Times said the "acting... is tops."

=== Box Office ===
The film performed poorly at the box office.
