= Tropical Trouble =

1936 film

- Directed by: Harry Hughes
- Written by: Vernon Harris; Stephen King-Hall (novel)
- Produced by: Basil Humphrys
- Starring: Douglass Montgomery; Betty Ann Davies; Alfred Drayton
- Cinematography: Geoffrey Faithfull
- Music by: Eric Spear
- Production company: City Film Corporation
- Distributed by: General Film Distributors
- Release date: October 1936
- Running time: 70 minutes
- Country: United Kingdom
- Language: English

Tropical Trouble is a 1936 British comedy film directed by Harry Hughes and starring Douglass Montgomery, Betty Ann Davies and Alfred Drayton. It was written by Vernon Harris based on the 1933 novel Bunga-Bunga by Stephen King-Hall, and was made as a quota quickie at Walton Studios.

== Preservation status ==
The British Film Institute National Archive holds a collection of stills but no film or video materials.

== Plot ==
A series of misunderstandings leads to a colonial governor's wife suspecting him of an affair with his assistant.

== Cast ==
- Douglass Montgomery as George Masterman
- Betty Ann Davies as Mary Masterman
- Alfred Drayton as Sir Monagu Thumpeter
- Natalie Hall as Louise van der Houten
- Sybil Grove as Lady Thumpeter
- Victor Stanley as Albert
- Gerald Barry as Sir Pomfrey Pogglethwaite
- Morris Harvey as Chief of the Bungs
- Marie Ault as Nonnie
- Vernon Harris as Martindale

== Reception ==
The Monthly Film Bulletin wrote: "Good photography, half a dozen amusing lines and a lavish – though non-tropical – setting are the best things in this picture which is hampered by tedious patches of dialogue and uneven direction. When Alfred Drayton has the stage the action is clear cut but at other times it is apt to degenerate into rather aimless horseplay, with more movement than humour."

Kine Weekly wrote: "Domestic farce-comedy in South Sea setting, this film adheres closely to threadbare tradition, with matrimonial squabbles and misunderstandings, the entering of wrong bedrooms, and even a dash of custard-pie at the end. Average light booking, with the quota angle to help it along: should go down fairly well in popular halls, where more obvious type of humour is appreciated. ... Douglass Montgomery struggles valiantly with the role of George, and except for an accent which varies bewilderingly, he does reasonably well."
