= A Case for PC 49 =

1951 British film by Francis Searle

- Directed by: Francis Searle
- Written by: Vernon Harris; Alan Stranks; Francis Searle
- Produced by: Anthony Hinds
- Starring: Brian Reece; Joy Shelton; Christine Norden; Michael Ripper
- Cinematography: Walter J. Harvey
- Edited by: James Needs
- Music by: Frank Spencer
- Production company: Hammer Films
- Distributed by: Exclusive Films
- Release date: 23 July 1951
- Running time: 81 minutes
- Country: United Kingdom
- Language: English

A Case for PC 49 is a 1951 British second feature ('B') crime drama directed by Francis Searle and starring Brian Reece, Joy Shelton and Christine Norden. It was written by Vernon Harris, Francis Searle and Alan Stranks, based on the popular BBC radio series, and made by Hammer Films at Bray Studios. The film was produced from Feb. 17, 1951 through March 16, 1951. This was Hammer Films' sequel to their 1949 film The Adventures of PC 49. They replaced actor Hugh Latimer with Brian Reece (who had been the voice of the character on the BBC). This film also provided actor Michael Ripper with one of his most lengthy roles.

== Plot ==
When millionaire Jimmy Pewter names model Della Dainton as his sole beneficiary, she decides to murder him with the help of her lover Victor Palentine. They kill Pewter and make it seem like an accident, but PC49 and his girlfriend Joan smell a rat. After gathering some evidence against Palantine, Joan is kidnapped but later found in Palantine's car and rescued by PC49. Meanwhile, Della Dainton has decided to kill Palantine as well and keep all the inheritance for herself. She hires two seedy guys who work for Palantine, and they succeed in killing their boss. Joan is kidnapped again by Della's cohorts, and once again rescued. PC49 tracks the culprits down to their hideaway in a brewery and has a shootout with them in the finale.

== Cast ==
- Brian Reece as Archibald Berkeley-Willoughby (PC49)
- Joy Shelton as Joan Carr
- Christine Norden as Della Dainton
- Leslie Bradley as Victor Palantine
- George McLeod as Inspector Wilson
- Campbell Singer as Sgt. Wright
- Jack Stewart as Cutler
- Michael Balfour as Chubby Price
- Michael Ripper as George Steele
- Joan Seton as Elsie
- Edna Morris as Mrs. Bott
- John Sharp as Desk Sergeant
- Frank Hawkins as the Police Sergeant
- John Barry as Jimmy Pewter
- John Warren as Coffee Dan

== Reception ==
The Monthly Film Bulletin wrote: "The film follows the pattern of the radio series and the previous P.C. 49 films: a brutal crime story lightened by the well worn comic atitude adopted by Brian Reece. The many moments of suspense too often end in elaborate anti-climaxes and the complicated plot draws to an over-simplified and abrupt ending."

Picturegoer wrote: "Provided you're not too exacting, you'll find eighty minutes in the custody of P.C. 49 quite a hectic experience. I did. I think the youngsters will enjoy it, too, despite the view of the censor, who's fitted it out with an 'A' certificate."
