= The Testament of William S. =

The Testament of William S. (Le Testament de William S.)
- First edition (French)
- Date: 2016
- Series: Blake and Mortimer

Creative team
- Writers: Yves Sente
- Artists: André Juillard

Original publication
- Language: French

Translation
- Publisher: Cinebook Ltd

Chronology
- Preceded by: Plutarch's Staff
- Followed by: The Valley of the Immortals

The Testament of William S. is the twenty-fourth album of the comic series Blake and Mortimer, written by Yves Sente and drawn by André Juillard, based on the characters created by Edgar P. Jacobs.

== Plot ==
In August 1958, a band of Teddy Boys terrorizes the city of London by attacking its inhabitants. The latest victim is the first secretary of the German embassy, failing to create a diplomatic crisis. Captain Francis Blake of MI5 and Chief Inspector Glenn Kendall of Scotland Yard are responsible for ending their abuses. That same evening, Captain Blake and Professor Philip Mortimer go to the Royal Albert Hall to attend a performance with William Shakespeare's The Merchant of Venice. After escorting the ladies home, they help a couple in Kensington Gardens and put the perpetrators to flight.

The same evening, the marquis Stefano da Spiri discovers in the cellars of his Venetian palace a secret room containing a mannequin locked in a glass case and an autobiography of his ancestor Gugliemo da Spiri. One letter explains that the autobiography includes three riddles leading to three keys that will provide access to an unpublished work by William Shakespeare. The next day, Sarah Summertown, president of the William Shakespeare Defenders Society, is made aware of the discovery and the Marquis's butler leaves for London to deliver the documents by hand. At the same time, the Earl of Oxford, who defends the idea that it is his ancestor Edward de Vere who is the true author of the work of Shakespeare, learns the news and decides to enlist the services of Olrik, currently imprisoned in Wandsworth.

As soon as he arrives in London, the Marquis's butler's papers are stolen by two Americans. Fortunately, the marquis had taken the precaution of sending the original by mail to his friend Blake. Sarah Summertown then explains to Blake and Mortimer the value of the discovery: in 1858, Lord Lupus Sandfield made the promise to donate a sum now representing 10 million pounds to whoever discovers a proof of the true authorship of the work of Shakespeare. This offer, valid for 100 years, expires in just three days. Contacted via his notary, the current Lord Sandfield confirms that the offer still holds, wanting to respect the will of his ancestor despite his financial problems.

The next day, Mortimer accompanies Sarah Summertown's daughter, Elizabeth McKenzie, on this treasure hunt. The first enigma takes them to Stratford-upon-Avon, Shakespeare's hometown, where they are followed by two Americans under Olrik's orders. Fortunately, the first key is not there and they take the train to Venice. During their journey, they learn through the autobiography that two friends are hiding behind the name of Shakespeare: William Shake, an English countryman, and Gugliemo da Spiri, an Italian noble who cannot use his name. In London, Lord Sandfield's secretary is violently assaulted by the Teddy gang.

In Venice, Mortimer and Elizabeth find the first key in a Shakespeare bust belonging to American billionaire Peggy Newgold. The second riddle indicates that the key is at the Arena of Verona, but as they leave, the two Americans, who are none other than Sharkey and Freddy, beat Mortimer and tie the two women to get a head start. Mortimer and Elizabeth still arrive first in Verona thanks to the billionaire's Ferrari and recover the second key. The third riddle takes them to Ravenna where they find the third and last key. Back in the Marquis's Venetian palace, they choose one of the keys to open the glass cage and retrieve the last work of Shakespeare intact. Incidentally, they realize that the mannequin is in fact a real human body, that of Gugliemo da Spiri who committed suicide with cantarella.

Mortimer and Elizabeth return to London and, thanks to a scheme developed by MI5, manage to save the work from the hands of Sharkey and Freddy who are waiting for them at the exit of the airport. Kendall and his men follow them to the Oxford Lodge where they are arrested with the count. For his part, Blake visits Lord Sandfield to advise him that the manuscript has been submitted on time to his secretary at the hospital for verification. He then pretends to leave the house. Lord Sandfield's son then enters the living room and reveals himself as the leader of the Teddy gang. He is about to kill his father to prevent payment of the reward and recover the inheritance when Blake shoots the weapon in his hand and stops them. Two days later, Blake, Mortimer, Sarah and Elizabeth remember their adventure. The manuscript could not be considered as valid proof by the notary because it was still an unsigned draft, but Sarah is pleased to have discovered the truth about Shakespeare and a financial agreement has been made with Lord Sandfield. Moreover, she is happy that her daughter could have known Mortimer better.

== Sources ==
- Book cover The Testament of William S.
- bedetheque.com
