= Paul and Michelle =

- Theatrical release poster
- Directed by: Lewis Gilbert
- Written by: Vernon Harris; Angela Huth; Story: Lewis Gilbert
- Produced by: Lewis Gilbert
- Starring: Anicée Alvina; Sean Bury; Keir Dullea
- Cinematography: Claude Renoir
- Edited by: Thelma Connell
- Music by: Michel Colombier
- Distributed by: Paramount Pictures (USA)
- Release date: May 1974 (US)
- Running time: 105 mins.
- Countries: France; United Kingdom
- Language: English

Paul and Michelle is a 1974 drama film directed and produced by Lewis Gilbert, whose story Vernon Harris and Angela Huth dramatized. It is a sequel to the 1971 film Friends, by the same director and with the same lead actors. Gilbert says the film was not as successful as the first - "it didn't have the same freshness" - although "it wasn't unsuccessful".

== Plot ==
Taking place approximately three years after the events in Friends, Paul and Michelle resumes the story of Paul Harrison (Sean Bury) and Michelle Latour (Anicée Alvina) after they are reunited. Paul, having successfully completed prep school in England as the head boy, returns to France to study at the Sorbonne and to locate his lover Michelle and their three-year-old daughter Sylvie. He is directed to Nice where Michelle had taken a job, only to find that she left the job due to an unpleasant situation with her boss, and is now living in a comfortable apartment with Garry (Keir Dullea), an older American airline pilot. Michelle had written to Paul many times, but his stepmother failed to give him the letters. Paul and Michelle discover that they are still in love, and return with Sylvie to Michelle's cottage in the Camargue for an idyllic summer. Garry is unhappy about losing Michelle and tries to get her to change her mind and stay with him, but accepts her choice to be with Paul.

When the Sorbonne term begins, Paul obtains a small, inexpensive apartment near the school and brings Michelle and Sylvie to live with him, and the two befriend some of Paul's classmates. Then Paul's father finds out Paul is living with Michelle and Sylvie, and cuts off Paul's allowance, causing both Paul and Michelle to have to go to work. Michelle also discovers she is pregnant by Garry, and feeling unable to afford or manage another child, she obtains an illegal abortion with the help of medical student friends, without telling Paul until she returns home visibly ill. Garry visits Michelle to tell her he will be moving to New York City and invites her to join him, but she chooses to stay with Paul. Tired from the demands of work, child care and Paul's studies, the couple begin to bicker, culminating in a major argument when Michelle returns from work and finds Paul taking a break at a cafe with an attractive female friend. During the argument, Sylvie wanders away from the apartment and Paul and Michelle frantically search for her before finding her unharmed later that night.

Michelle decides that their living arrangement is not working, and that she and Sylvie should return to the cottage until Paul finishes school and gets a good job and a nicer apartment. She will get a job in Arles to support Sylvie, and Paul can visit for holidays. Paul accepts her decision, reasoning that they survived a three-year separation before and can do so again. In the final scene, Paul puts Michelle and Sylvie on the train to Arles and sadly waves goodbye as it pulls away.

== Cast ==
- Sean Bury as Paul Harrison
- Anicée Alvina as Michelle Latour
- Keir Dullea as Garry
- Ronald Lewis as Sir Robert Harrison
- Catherine Allégret as Joanna
- Georges Beller as Daniel
- Anne Lonnberg as Susannah
- Sara Stout as Sylvie
- Steve Gilbert as Nic
- Anthony Clarke as "Hush"
- Peggy Frankston as Lilli
- Peter Graves as Sir Henry
- Toby Robins as Jane
- André Maranne as Bellancourt
- Sylvie Joly as The Receptionist

== Production ==
Gilbert later put the three-year gap between the movies down to "laziness" on his part.

== Reception ==
Gene Siskel of the Chicago Tribune gave the film one-and-a-half stars out of four and wrote, "Paul and Michelle are not real human beings; their responses are contrived. Both treat the world as a large doll house, while the script treats them as caricatures of what teen-agers might think young adults were like 20 years ago." Variety wrote that "instead of combining elements into some semblance of acceptable soap, Gilbert merely piles one ingredient on top of the other without sorting each out for proper emotional emphasis. By trafficking in stereotypes, producer-director makes neither the lovers nor their various predicaments absorbing, believable or even interesting." Kevin Thomas of the Los Angeles Times wrote that Lewis Gilbert "should have left well alone" after Friends, because the sequel "is hopelessly contrived and tedious." Gary Arnold of The Washington Post called it "an eminently uncalled-for sequel" that ends "with another separation and the threat of another sequel three years hence, when Paul will have finished college and be ready to assume the full burdens of a family man. If the moviegoing public has any regard for its own welfare, it will take this threat seriously and help prevent Lewis Gilbert from making a fool of himself three times in a row."
