= David Spenser =

British actor, director, producer and writer (1934–2013)

- Born: David De Saram; 12 March 1934; Colombo, Ceylon
- Died: 20 July 2013 (aged 79); Spain
- Occupations: Actor, television producer, radio producer
- Years active: 1945–1972
- Partner: Victor Pemberton (1931–2013)
- Relatives: Jeremy Spenser (brother)

David Spenser (né De Saram; 12 March 1934 – 20 July 2013) was a British actor, director, producer and writer. Spenser played the title role in a 1948 radio production of Richmal Crompton's Just William, and also appeared in popular films and TV series including Doctor Who. His documentary about Gwen Ffrangcon-Davies won an International Emmy Award. He was the elder brother of actor Jeremy Spenser.

Aged 11 he appeared in plays on BBC radio's Children's Hour. He was cast in Just William by the author of the books, Richmal Crompton.

He played Harry in the first production of Benjamin Britten's opera Albert Herring.

Spenser was a regular on television, with appearances in episodes of Z-Cars, Dixon of Dock Green, and The Saint. In 1967 Spenser appeared as Thonmi in the Doctor Who serial The Abominable Snowmen alongside Patrick Troughton. Spenser later worked as a radio producer for the BBC. He produced several radio plays including Anthony Trollope's The Way We Live Now in 1988, and Christopher Isherwood's Mr Norris Changes Trains in 1984.

Spenser wrote a historical drama about the Egyptian pharaoh Akhnaton, The City of the Horizon. It was broadcast in 1972 and 1976. Spenser subsequently produced documentaries about figures such as Benny Hill, Angus Wilson, Dodie Smith and Gwen Ffrangcon-Davies.

Spenser was the life partner of writer and producer Victor Pemberton.

== Filmography ==
Year	Title	Role	Notes
1954	Conflict of Wings	Corporal, Flying Control	
1959	The Stranglers of Bombay	Gopali Das	Uncredited
1962	Play It Cool	Reporter #1	Uncredited
1962	In Search of the Castaways	South American Guide	
1964	The Earth Dies Screaming	Mel	
1967	Battle Beneath the Earth	Maj. Chai	
1967	Some May Live	Inspector Sung	
1968	Carry On... Up the Khyber	Bungdit Din's servant	
