= Vernon Harris =

British screenwriter (1905–1999)

Vernon Reginald Harris (26 February 1905 – 26 January 1999) was a British screenwriter. Harris was born in Folkestone. He worked extensively for radio at the BBC, notably on PC49 and Band Waggon.

== Life and career ==
Harris often worked with the film director Lewis Gilbert who said:

[Harris] worked with me in some way on almost every film I did over nearly forty years. In those early days, we very often did the complete screenplay together. Vernon’s real strength was as a script editor. We would lay out the scenario together and we would then usually depend upon a dialogue writer to supply the dialogue.

Harris was nominated for an Academy Award for Best Adapted Screenplay for his script for film Oliver! (1968). He died on 26 January 1999, aged 93.

== Credits ==
=== Screenwriter ===
- Play Up the Band (1935)
- Joy Ride (1935) – also story
- The Improper Duchess (1936)
- Tropical Trouble (1936)
- Band Waggon (1940) – also devised by
- The Adventures of PC 49 (1949) – based on radio series
- A Case for PC 49 (1951) – also based on radio series
- Emergency Call (1952) aka The Hundred Hour Hunt
- There Was a Young Lady (1953) – original story
- Cosh Boy (1953) aka The Slasher
- Albert R.N. (1953) aka Break to Freedom
- The Good Die Young (1954)
- The Sea Shall Not Have Them (1954)
- Reach for the Sky (1956) – additional scenes
- Three Men in a Boat (1956, joint nomination with Hubert Gregg for BAFTA Award for Best British Screenplay)
- The Admirable Crichton (1957) aka Paradise Lagoon
- Carve Her Name with Pride (1958)
- A Cry from the Streets (1958) (nomination for BAFTA Award for Best British Screenplay)
- Ferry to Hong Kong (1959)
- Light Up the Sky! (1960)
- Almost Angels (1962)
- Emergency (1962)
- Oliver! (1968 – 1969 nominee for Academy Award for Writing Adapted Screenplay)
- Friends (1971)
- Paul and Michelle (1974)

=== As script editor ===
- The Adventurers (1970)
- Seven Nights in Japan (1976)
- The Spy Who Loved Me (1977)
- Moonraker (1979)
- Educating Rita (1983)

=== Storyboard artist ===
- Shirley Valentine (1989)

=== Actor ===
- Joy Ride (1935)
- Show Flat (1936)
- Tropical Trouble (1936)
- Farewell Again (1937)
- The Claydon Treasure Mystery (1938)
- The Last Barricade (1938)
- The Gables Mystery (1938)

=== Radio Writer ===
- Band Waggon (1938–40)
- The Adventures of PC 49
