= The History of Mr. Polly (film) =

1949 British drama

- Directed by: Anthony Pelissier
- Written by: Anthony Pelissier; H. G. Wells
- Produced by: John Mills
- Starring: John Mills; Betty Ann Davies; Megs Jenkins; Moore Marriott; Finlay Currie
- Cinematography: Desmond Dickinson
- Edited by: John Seabourne
- Music by: William Alwyn
- Distributed by: General Film Distributors
- Release dates: 1949 (UK); 1951 (U.S.)
- Running time: 95 minutes
- Country: United Kingdom
- Language: English
- Budget: £253,500
- Box office: £81,400

The History of Mr Polly is a 1949 British film directed by Anthony Pelissier and starring John Mills, Betty Ann Davies, Megs Jenkins, Moore Marriott and Finlay Currie. It was written by Pelissier based on the 1910 comic novel The History of Mr. Polly by H. G. Wells. It was the first adaptation of one of Wells's works to be produced after his death in 1946.

== Plot ==
Following his dismissal from a draper's shop, where his father had placed him as an apprentice, Alfred Polly finds it hard to find another position. When a telegram arrives informing him of his father's death, he returns to the family home.

With a bequest of £500, Polly considers his future. A friend of his father's, Mr Johnsen, urges him to invest it in a shop – an idea that Polly dislikes. Whilst dawdling in the country on a newlybought bicycle, Polly has a brief dalliance with a schoolgirl, Christabel; but later marries one of his cousins, Miriam Larkins. Fifteen years later, Polly and his wife are running a draper's shop in Fishbourne, and the marriage has descended to incessant arguments and bickering.

While walking in the country, Polly decides to attempt suicide. He sets his shop ablaze in the hope that the insurance will assure Miriam's prosperity. However, he botches the arson job and, instead of killing himself, rescues an elderly neighbour and becomes a minor local celebrity.

Still unhappy, Polly leaves his wife and is hired by a rural innkeeper as handyman and ferryman; however, he soon realises that the position was only open because the innkeeper's brother-in-law Jim is a drunkard who bullies any other man to leave the inn. Polly clashes with him until the latter accidentally drowns in a weir while chasing Polly. Three years later, Polly returns to Fishbourne to find Miriam operating a tea-shop with her sister in the belief that Polly has drowned, and he returns to his happier life at the inn.

== Cast ==
- John Mills as Alfred Polly
- Betty Ann Davies as Miriam Larkins
- Megs Jenkins as the innkeeper
- Finlay Currie as Uncle Jim
- Gladys Henson as Aunt Larkins
- Diana Churchill as Annie Larkins
- Shelagh Fraser as Minnie Larkins
- Edward Chapman as Mr Johnson
- Dandy Nichols as Mrs Johnson
- Sally Ann Howes as Christabel
- Juliet Mills as Little Polly
- Laurence Baskcomb as Mr Rumbold
- Edie Martin as lady on roof
- Moore Marriott as Uncle Pentstemon
- David Horne as Mr Garvace
- Ernest Jay as Mr Hinks
- Cyril Smith as Mr Voules
- Wylie Watson as Mr Rusper
- Jay Laurier as Mr Boomer
- Doris Hare as May Pant
- Irene Handl as guest at funeral
- Miles Malleson as ferry Passenger

== Critical reception ==
At the time of its release, Variety wrote "Faithful adherence to the original H. G. Wells story is one of the main virtues of The History of Mr Polly," with the reviewer concluding that "Director Anthony Pelissier has put all the emphasis on the principal characters, and has extracted every ounce of human interest from the classic. Every part, right down to the smallest bit, has been selected with care and there is some notable work from an experienced cast."

The Monthly Film Bulletin wrote: "This film, though rather too long, provides enjoyable entertainment. The first part is slow but the second half is better. The text is changed very little, and the entire film is humorous without being vulgar. The settings are good and the excellent photography plays a large part in the film. The characterisation of Mr Polly by John Mills is very good, though at times he is comical when he should have been pathetic. Megs Jenkins, as the Plump Woman, gives her best performance to date. Finlay Currie gives a fine and humorous portrayal of Uncle Jim, and Betty Ann Davis is very good as Mr Polly's shrewish wife. John Mills, besides playing a good lead, has worked hard and with care at his first attempt as producer."

Kine Weekly wrote: "The broad approach adopted by producer-star John Mills is not exactly flattering to the author or, for that matter, to the more intelligent picturegoer, but, although much of the original wit, satire, romanticism and humanity is sacrificed, the film is on the whole a reasonably entertaining example of ye olde English light fare."

In British Sound Films: The Studio Years 1928–1959 David Quinlan rated the film as "good", writing: "pleasant, sunny version of classic book, with nicely captured rural atmosphere."

== Box office ==
Producer's receipts were £70,900 in the UK and £10,500 overseas. According to Rank's own records the film had made a loss of £172,100 for the company by December 1949.
