= Lewis Gilbert =

English film director (1920–2018)

Lewis Gilbert CBE
- Born: 6 March 1920; London, England
- Died: 23 February 2018 (aged 97); Monaco
- Occupations: Film director, producer, screenwriter, actor
- Years active: 1925–2002
- Spouse: Hylda Tafler (m. 1952; died 2005)
- Children: 1

Lewis Gilbert CBE (6 March 1920 – 23 February 2018) was an English film director, producer and screenwriter who directed more than 40 films during six decades; among them such varied titles as Cast a Dark Shadow (1955), Reach for the Sky (1956), Carve Her Name with Pride (1958), Sink the Bismarck! (1960), Alfie (1966), Educating Rita (1983) and Shirley Valentine (1989), as well as three James Bond films: You Only Live Twice (1967), The Spy Who Loved Me (1977) and Moonraker (1979).

== Early life ==
Lewis Gilbert was born as Louis Laurie Isaacs in Clapton, London, to a second-generation family of music hall performers, and spent his early years travelling with his parents, Ada (Griver), who was of Jewish descent, and George Gilbert, and watching the shows from the wings. He first performed on stage at the age of five, when asked to drive a trick car around the stage. This pleased the audience, so this became the finale of his parents' act. When travelling on trains, his parents frequently hid him in the luggage rack, to avoid paying a fare for him. His father contracted tuberculosis as a young man and died aged 34, when Gilbert was seven.

Gilbert was a child actor in the 1920s and 1930s, but soon after the death of his father, his mother was unable to financially support him, while she was a film extra, and this led to Gilbert being taken in by his aunt Daisy Gilbert, with frequent visits from his mother.

Daisy Gilbert was a known Vaudeville performer in the duo "The Dancing Gilbert Sisters", who performed at venues such as the Hackney Empire, and Tivoli in Australia. And it was Daisy Gilbert's husband Harry Rosen, who was a known retailer at the time, who helped Gilbert financially when he wanted to become a film director in the early stages of his career.

During this time Gilbert had many difficulties with his formal education, but In 1933, at the age of 13, he had a role in Victor Hanbury and John Stafford's Dick Turpin, and at age 17 a small uncredited role in The Divorce of Lady X (1938) opposite Laurence Olivier.

It was Daisy Gilbert, who helped him to get the role in The Divorce of Lady X, with the intention that Gilbert would be credited for it.

Later Alexander Korda offered to send him to RADA, but Gilbert chose to study direction instead, assisting Alfred Hitchcock's Jamaica Inn (1939).

When the Second World War started, he joined the Royal Air Force's film unit, where he worked on various documentary films. He was eventually seconded to the First Motion Picture Unit of the U.S. Army Air Forces, where his commanding officer was William Keighley, an American film director, who allowed Gilbert to take on much of his film-making work.

== Directorial career ==
After the war, he continued to write and direct documentary shorts for Gaumont British, before entering low budget feature film production. Gilbert made his name as a director in the 1950s and 1960s with a series of successful films, often working as the film's writer and producer as well. These films were often based on true stories from the Second World War. Examples include Reach for the Sky (1956) (based on the life of air ace Douglas Bader), Carve Her Name with Pride (1958) (the story of SOE agent Violette Szabo) and Sink the Bismarck! (1960). He had a huge flop with Ferry to Hong Kong.

=== Alfie ===
Gilbert directed Alfie (1966) starring Michael Caine. Gilbert's wife Hylda discovered the play by Bill Naughton when she visited the hair salon and sat next to an actress who was in a production. Upon seeing the play, Hylda urged Gilbert to make it into a film. Gilbert used the technique of having the lead character speak directly to the viewer, a technique he later also used in Shirley Valentine (1989). Gilbert said Alfie was only made because the low budget was "the sort of money Paramount executives normally spend on cigar bills". The film won the Jury Special Prize at the Cannes Film Festival, and was nominated for five Academy Awards including Best Picture. Gilbert was also nominated for a Golden Globe for Best Director.

In 1967, Gilbert was chosen to direct Lionel Bart's musical version of Oliver!, but he was already contracted to another project and had to withdraw from it; he recommended Carol Reed, who took over. "It was the lowest point in my life," said Gilbert. "I'd developed Oliver! with Lionel Bart. I had to do The Adventurers instead... While doing this film, I signed to do The Godfather. Because of their financial problems, Paramount could only find $2m to make it. I said it needed $7m". So, instead, Gilbert made Friends (1971 movie).

=== James Bond ===
Although known for character dramas, Gilbert directed three of the James Bond films. After some reluctance, he was persuaded by Harry Saltzman and Albert R. Broccoli to direct You Only Live Twice (1967). He refused the opportunity to direct On Her Majesty's Secret Service. Gilbert returned to the series in the 1970s to make The Spy Who Loved Me (1977) and Moonraker (1979). After the high production costs of Moonraker and the financial failure of Michael Cimino's Heaven's Gate, United Artists was unable to afford to hire him to direct the next Bond film For Your Eyes Only.

=== Later career ===
In the 1980s, he returned to more small-scale dramas with film versions of Willy Russell's plays Educating Rita (1983) and Shirley Valentine (1989). Gilbert also directed the film Stepping Out (1991).

Gilbert was appointed a Commander of the Order of the British Empire (CBE) in the 1997 Birthday Honours for services to the film industry. In 2001, Gilbert was made a Fellow of the British Film Institute, the highest accolade in the British film industry.

In June 2010, he appeared on the BBC Radio 4 programme Desert Island Discs. In it, he said that his 1970 film The Adventurers was a disaster, and that he should never have made it. On working with Orson Welles on Ferry to Hong Kong, he said that it was: "dreadful, it was my nightmare film. It was a dreadful film, and everything was wrong with it; principally him [Welles]." He also said that his biggest mistake was failing to direct the film version of the musical Oliver!.

== Personal life ==
Gilbert was married to Hylda Tafler for 66 years, until her death in June 2005. They had a son, Stephen, and raised another, John, hers from a prior relationship.

All My Flashbacks: The Autobiography of Lewis Gilbert, Sixty Years a Film Director was published by Reynolds & Hearn in 2010.

Gilbert died aged 97 at his home in Monaco on 23 February 2018.

== Filmography ==
Year	Film	Director	Producer	Screenwriter	Notes
1945	The Ten Year Plan	Yes		Yes	documentary about the building of pre-fabricated houses
1946	Arctic Harvest	Yes			documentary about cod-fishing in the Arctic and the production of cod liver oil
1947	World Economic Geography: Fishing Grounds of the World	Yes			also known as Sailors Do Care, documentary about the British and international fishing industry
1948	The Little Ballerina	Yes		Yes	
1949	Under One Roof	Yes			UN-sponsored documentary about the students from different countries who attend Loughborough Engineering College
1949	Marry Me!			Yes	
1950	Once a Sinner	Yes			
1951	There Is Another Sun	Yes			
1951	Scarlet Thread	Yes			
1952	Emergency Call	Yes		Yes	
1952	Time Gentlemen, Please!	Yes			
1953	Cosh Boy	Yes		Yes	
1953	Johnny on the Run	Yes	Yes		
1953	Albert R.N.	Yes			
1954	The Good Die Young	Yes		Yes	
1954	The Sea Shall Not Have Them	Yes		Yes	
1955	Cast a Dark Shadow	Yes			
1956	Reach for the Sky	Yes		Yes	
1957	The Admirable Crichton	Yes		Yes	
1958	Carve Her Name with Pride	Yes		Yes	
1958	A Cry from the Streets	Yes			
1959	Ferry to Hong Kong	Yes		Yes	
1960	Light Up the Sky!	Yes	Yes		
1960	Sink the Bismarck!	Yes			
1961	The Greengage Summer	Yes			
1962	H.M.S. Defiant	Yes			
1964	The 7th Dawn	Yes			
1966	Alfie	Yes	Yes		Jury Prize at the Cannes Film Festival
1967	You Only Live Twice	Yes			
1970	The Adventurers	Yes	Yes	Yes	
1971	Friends	Yes	Yes	Yes	
1974	Paul and Michelle	Yes	Yes	Yes	
1975	Operation Daybreak	Yes			
1976	Seven Nights in Japan	Yes	Yes		
1977	The Spy Who Loved Me	Yes			
1979	Moonraker	Yes			
1983	Educating Rita	Yes	Yes		
1985	Not Quite Paradise	Yes	Yes		
1989	Shirley Valentine	Yes	Yes		
1991	Stepping Out	Yes	Yes		
1995	Haunted	Yes	Yes	Yes	
2002	Before You Go	Yes			
