= List of Callan episodes =

The following is a complete episode list for Callan, given in broadcast order, with Edward Woodward in the title role. There was a total of 44 episodes produced and broadcast between 1967 and 1972. The show's first two series were made in black and white, the third and fourth in colour. Of the 22 black and white episodes, ten are missing from the archives; both the colour series exist complete. All the surviving episodes have been released by Network DVD.

== Pilot ==
The pilot was broadcast in black and white.

No	Series	Ep	Title	Writer	Director	Original airdate	Archive
001	Pilot		Armchair Theatre: 'A Magnum for Schneider'	James Mitchell	Bill Bain	4 February 1967	Survives

=== Overview ===
Callan has been fired from an anonymous government agency known as "The Section" which is run by Colonel Hunter. ("Hunter" is a pseudonym for the current Section Chief, like the C of SIS.) The Section removes those who pose a danger to the "innocent" by persuasion, blackmail, extortion or death. David Callan had been the Section's top operator but he had become too curious about his targets and the rationale for their removal. The Section considered him vulnerable, volatile and dangerous and had laid him off to a dead-end book-keeping job for an ungrateful employer. Callan is where Hunter can keep an eye on him and also in daily, casual and unknowing contact with his next victim. If he can kill Schneider after making his acquaintance as a fellow war games enthusiast then he can kill anyone: this is the question to which Hunter urgently requires an answer.

Hunter describes Callan as "a dead shot, with the cold nerve to kill" and considers him far too useful to be allowed to retire. In this screenplay, Hunter invites Callan back to the Section to remove Schneider as a favour. Schneider's nefarious activities are known to the authorities but he is too clever to be caught by normal methods. Hunter wants Schneider eliminated but offers Callan no help from the Section—ostensibly to allow Callan to prove his loyalty and dedication. Hunter secretly sends Toby Meres to set Callan up to take the fall for the assassination, should this become necessary.

Callan's curiosity about his victims overwhelms him again and he investigates Schneider, discovering a massive gun-running operation. Satisfied, Callan formulates his plan. He calls on his petty criminal contact Lonely, played by Russell Hunter. Lonely is unsure of Callan's identity and motives but fearfully provides a "Noguchi .38 Magnum" plus 20 rounds (and returning the .38 revolver he had previously purchased from Lonely for killing Schneider). Callan has a chance meeting with Schneider and finds common ground in their interest in model soldiers and war games.

At Schneider's house, where Callan and his host re-play a scenario from the Peninsular War and go on to recreate the Battle of Gettysburg, Meres breaks in, distracting Callan. Hunter sends the police in order to ensure Callan is caught red-handed. Schneider, suspicious, uncovers Meres and holds the two men at gunpoint. Schneider searches Callan but misses the Magnum and Callan kills Schneider.

Meres attempts to finish the set-up but Callan knocks Meres unconscious. Callan phones Hunter about Schneider and says he will leave Meres to the police, and that he is quitting the Section. He tells Hunter "I liked Schneider... but I hate you". Hunter orders Callan's file to be changed to a red folder—targeting him for removal.

== Series 1 ==
This series was broadcast in black and white.

No	Series	Ep	Title	Writer	Director	Original airdate	Archive
002	1	1	'The Good Ones Are All Dead'	James Mitchell	Toby Robertson	8 July 1967	Survives
003	1	2	'Goodbye, Nobby Clarke'	Robert Banks Stewart	Peter Duguid	15 July 1967	Missing
004	1	3	'The Death of Robert E. Lee'	James Mitchell	Robert Tronson	22 July 1967	Missing
005	1	4	'Goodness Burns Too Bright'	James Mitchell	Bill Bain	29 July 1967	Missing
006	1	5	'But He's a Lord, Mr Callan'	James Mitchell	Guy Verney	5 August 1967	Missing
007	1	6	'You Should Have Got Here Sooner'	James Mitchell	Piers Haggard	12 August 1967	Survives

=== Overview ===
ABC then commissioned a series of six episodes in 1967. In the first episode Callan rejoins the section in an unofficial capacity. The series was characterised by Callan's stand-off, barely-respectful relationship between him and his boss. Hunter schemed to retain Callan on his side and would play him off in little divide-and-rule scenarios with or against his fellow agents to keep control. It was not always apparent that it worked. Callan's contact Lonely (Russell Hunter) developed into an unofficial sidekick, whose shadowing qualities outshone his sense of personal hygiene, something Meres in particular took joy in pointing out. Lonely remained ignorant to Callan's real work and believed him to be something of a gangland villain.

== Series 2 ==
This series was broadcast in black and white.

No	Series	Ep	Title	Writer	Director	Original airdate	Archive
008	2	1	'Red Knight, White Knight'	James Mitchell	Peter Duguid	8 January 1969	Survives
009	2	2	'The Most Promising Girl of Her Year'	James Mitchell	Peter Duguid	15 January 1969	Survives
010	2	3	'You're Under Starter's Orders'	Robert Banks Stewart	Mike Vardy	22 January 1969	Missing
011	2	4	'The Little Bits and Pieces of Love'	James Mitchell	Peter Sasdy	29 January 1969	Survives
012	2	5	'Let's Kill Everybody'	Ray Jenkins	Robert Tronson	5 February 1969	Survives
013	2	6	'Heir Apparent'	John Kershaw	Peter Duguid	12 February 1969	Survives
014	2	7	'Land of Light and Peace'	James Mitchell	Piers Haggard	19 February 1969	Missing
015	2	8	'Blackmailers Should Be Discouraged'	James Mitchell	Jim Goddard	26 February 1969	Missing
016	2	9	'Death of a Friend'	Ray Jenkins	Peter Duguid	5 March 1969	Survives
017	2	10	'Jack-On-Top'	Trevor Preston	Mike Vardy	12 March 1969	Missing
018	2	11	'Once a Big Man, Always a Big Man'	Lee Dunne	Bill Bain	19 March 1969	Audio only
019	2	12	'The Running Dog'	William Emms	Jim Goddard	26 March 1969	Missing
020	2	13	'The Worst Soldier I Ever Saw'	James Mitchell	Robert Tronson	2 April 1969	Survives as a complete recording block*
021	2	14	'Nice People Die at Home'	Robert Banks Stewart, Terence Feely	Peter Duguid	9 April 1969	Survives
022	2	15	'Death of a Hunter'	Michael Winder	Reginald Collin	16 April 1969	Survives

- "The Worst Soldier I Ever Saw" survives as a complete recording block, including retakes, studio clocks and some banter between the cast and production crew between shots, while the precise broadcast episode is missing. On Network's "The Monochrome Years" DVD release of Callan, "The Worst Soldier I Ever Saw" was re-edited as close as possible to the transmission episode, but is unlikely to be precisely as broadcast in 1969 in terms of the timing of cuts between shots. The complete recording block of "The Worst Soldier I Ever Saw" was released on Network's DVD release titled "Callan: This Man Alone".
- "Nice People Die at Home" was originally recorded for Series 1, but was held back until Episode 14 of Series 2 for transmission. This episode sees a brief return of some internal thought dialogue by Callan that was previously done in "A Magnum for Schneider" and in the Series 1 episodes, but which was discontinued afterwards. As a result of many plot changes since Series 1, the original Hunter played by Ronald Radd returned in the episode "The Worst Soldier I Ever Saw" alongside the current Hunter played by Derek Bond, with dialogue explaining that Radd would briefly return as Hunter while Bond's Hunter was on a diplomatic trip to the Soviet Union. In the transmitted episode "Nice People Die at Home", along with Radd's character being back as Hunter for that one episode, there is also some additional scenes and dialogue involving Radd that had been recorded to make the current plots join up, as Callan was now fully employed by the Section.
- "Once a Big Man, Always a Big Man", an audio recording of this episode was discovered by TV archivists Kaleidoscope, and a copy was included in "Callan - The Ultimate Collection DVD".

=== Overview ===
By 1969, ABC Weekend Television had, via enforced merger and some additional personnel, become Thames Television. A second season of fifteen episodes that had already been completed by ABC was therefore transmitted by its successor in 1969. This run ended with "Death of a Hunter" in which the Section chief meets his demise, and Callan is shot – perhaps fatally. It had not been decided whether the show would return for a third series, so this device was used to leave open either the possibility of more stories in the future, or a way of winding-up the show. Two endings were taped, one in which Callan definitely died and the other in which Callan's survival was left in doubt. In the end, the latter ending was used as Thames decided to bring the programme back for its third series in 1970, this time in full colour and consisting of nine episodes.

In the television series, successive Hunters were played by Ronald Radd, Michael Goodliffe, Derek Bond and William Squire. The last's portrayal of a steely exterior, delivering ice-cold decisions with an underplayed theatrical flair, made for a match for Callan. Squire is probably the best remembered of all the supporting actors who played Hunter as a result.

Toby Meres was brought to life by Anthony Valentine (Peter Bowles in the pilot), an upper class thug whose demeanour barely concealed the cold and calculating thug he truly was. Meres enjoyed his work very much without questioning, a value Hunter found extremely useful and one which irritated Callan no end. Yet, as colleagues in the field, whose lives may depend on each other at a moment's notice, Meres and Callan developed an edgy, mutual respect. Meres departed for a posting in the USA at the end of the second series (in truth, Valentine left to appear in the new rival series Codename on the rival BBC network).

== Series 3 ==
This series was broadcast in colour.

No	Series	Ep	Title	Writer	Director	Original airdate	Archive
023	3	1	'Where Else Could I Go?'	James Mitchell	Jim Goddard	8 April 1970	Survives
024	3	2	'Summoned to Appear'	Trevor Preston	Voytek	15 April 1970	Survives
025	3	3	'The Same Trick Twice'	Bill Craig	Peter Duguid	22 April 1970	Survives
026	3	4	'A Village Called 'G''	James Mitchell	Mike Vardy	13 May 1970	Survives
027	3	5	'Suddenly – at Home'	James Mitchell	Piers Haggard	20 May 1970	Survives
028	3	6	'Act of Kindness'	Michael Winder	Mike Vardy	27 May 1970	Survives
029	3	7	'God Help Your Friends'	William Emms	Peter Duguid	3 June 1970	Survives
030	3	8	'Breakout'	James Mitchell	Reginald Collin	10 June 1970	Survives
031	3	9	'Amos Green Must Live'	Ray Jenkins	Jim Goddard	24 June 1970	Survives

=== Overview ===
The third series of nine episodes, the first in colour, saw Callan still recovering from having been shot and struggling to come to terms with his situation. Interviews with Snell (the Section's doctor) and poor shooting range results with cardboard cutouts of people portray Callan as having lost his aggression and whose future with the Section looks to be in serious doubt. If Callan is to be of any use to Hunter, something has to spark him into life. In league with Meres's brasher, edgier and unpredictable replacement, James Cross (played by Patrick Mower), Hunter concocts a scenario whereby Callan's energies are incited into real emotion that can be turned against the enemy. The remaining eight episodes see the revitalised yet ever-more world-weary assassin cover more ground, including one episode where love comes unexpectedly into his life again, and which has the (expected) unexpected ending.

Cross is an agent whose arrogance more than matches that of his predecessor Meres, however, his lack of years means he requires more nurturing by his vastly more experienced mentor. This includes the necessary teaching of lessons more than once in a while. When it became known that Patrick Mower would be leaving halfway-through Series 4 (to head up "Special Branch"), Cross's character was developed, getting increasingly unpredictable and coming under the scrutiny of Snell, the Section's doctor, until his ultimate demise which was apparently of his own choosing. This paved the way for a more mature Meres to return from his secondment in Washington and help finish the series off.

== Series 4 ==
This series was broadcast in colour.

No	Series	Ep	Title	Writer	Director	Original airdate	Archive
032	4	1	'That'll Be the Day'	James Mitchell	Mike Vardy	1 March 1972	Survives
033	4	2	'Call Me Sir!'	Bill Craig	Bill Bain, Mike Vardy	8 March 1972	Survives
034	4	3	'First Refusal'	Bill Craig	Jim Goddard	15 March 1972	Survives
035	4	4	'Rules of the Game'	Ray Jenkins	Voytek	22 March 1972	Survives
036	4	5	'If He Can, So Could I'	Ray Jenkins	Peter Duguid	29 March 1972	Survives
037	4	6	'None of Your Business'	Trevor Preston	Voytek	5 April 1972	Survives
038	4	7	'Charlie Says It's Goodbye'	James Mitchell	Peter Duguid	12 April 1972	Survives
039	4	8	'I Never Wanted the Job'	John Kershaw	Jim Goddard	19 April 1972	Survives
040	4	9	'The Carrier'	Peter Hill	Jonathan Alwyn	26 April 1972	Survives
041	4	10	'The Contract'	Bill Craig	Reginald Collin	3 May 1972	Survives
042	4	11	'The Richmond File: Call Me Enemy'	George Markstein	Bill Bain	10 May 1972	Survives
043	4	12	'The Richmond File: Do You Recognise the Woman?'	Bill Craig	Peter Duguid	17 May 1972	Survives
044	4	13	'The Richmond File: A Man Like Me'	James Mitchell	Reginald Collin	24 May 1972	Survives

=== Overview ===
The final set of thirteen episodes was broadcast in 1972. This saw Callan develop further than before. An unsuccessful mission means Callan is being interrogated in a Russian prison, but is exchanged with the Russians for one of their agents. Now he is known, he has become a liability. What to do with the Section's top agent is later solved by promoting him into the role of Hunter – a post he dislikes as much, or even more, than serving under a Hunter. However, this move by his masters has motives, and Callan is eventually relieved of his duties after an incident where he enters the field of duty, which is against the rules. He is replaced as Hunter by his predecessor. The final three episodes form a trilogy based around a defecting Soviet agent, Richmond, played by T. P. McKenna, which was sub-titled "The Richmond File".

After an attempt at subtle interrogation and de-briefing in a remote location, Richmond dodges Callan and other guards outside. The 'defecting' line proves to be an elaborate cover. Richmond's brief is to carry out an assassination on British soil and the section needs to stop him. At the end of lengthy cat-and-mouse games, both men duel it out among crowds of containers inside a warehouse. Callan finally gains the upper hand. Richmond – knowing exactly how he would be treated – pleads for Callan to kill him instead of capturing him, which Callan does. Having disobeyed orders to help A Man Like Me (final episode title), Callan finally walks out of the Section knowing that his file will be placed into a red folder.

== Reunion television film ==
The reunion television movie was broadcast in colour.

No	Season	Ep	Title	Writer	Director	Original airdate	Archive
045	TV film		'Wet Job'	James Mitchell	Shaun O'Riordan	2 September 1981	Survives

=== Overview ===
In the 1981 feature-length television story Wet Job, written by Mitchell and produced by ATV (without the original theme music or logo) Callan has become the proprietor of a military memorabilia shop when he is recruited by the new Hunter for one more job. Alas, he has to do this alone: Lonely has become a dapper gent, engaged to be married, and with enough self-confidence to defy Callan's request for help. In the end, Callan completes the task, survives and even ends up with a girlfriend.
