= Callan (film) =

1974 British film by Don Sharp

- UK theatrical poster
- Directed by: Don Sharp
- Written by: James Mitchell
- Based on: A Red File for Callan by James Mitchell
- Produced by: Harry Benn; Derek Horne
- Starring: Edward Woodward; Eric Porter; Carl Möhner; Catherine Schell; Peter Egan; Russell Hunter
- Cinematography: Ernest Steward
- Edited by: Teddy Darvas
- Music by: Wilfred Josephs
- Production company: Magnum Films
- Distributed by: EMI
- Release dates: May 23, 1974 (London); June 12, 1974 (United Kingdom)
- Running time: 101 minutes
- Country: United Kingdom
- Language: English

Callan (also known as This is Callan) is a 1974 British thriller film directed by Don Sharp and starring Edward Woodward, Eric Porter, Carl Möhner and Russell Hunter. It was written by James Mitchell based on his novel A Red File for Callan, itself based on Mitchell's pilot episode for the ITV television series Callan (1967–1972).

== Plot ==
David Callan, a leading intelligence agent/assassin in the employment of the S.I.S., was forced into retirement when he lost his nerve. Now, he is called back into service to handle the assassination of Schneider, a German businessman. Colonel Hunter, his former employer, promises Callan that he'll be returned to active status as long as he follows his orders. But Callan refuses to act until he knows exactly why Schneider has been marked for death.

== Cast ==
- Edward Woodward as David Callan
- Russell Hunter as Lonely
- Eric Porter as Charles Hunter
- Peter Egan as Toby Meres
- Carl Möhner as Rudolph Schneider
- Catherine Schell as Jenny
- Kenneth Griffith as Waterman
- Michael Da Costa as The Greek
- Veronica Lang as Liz
- Clifford Rose as Dr. Snell
- David Prowse as Arthur
- Don Henderson as George
- Nadim Sawalha as Padilla
- David Graham as wireless operator
- Yuri Borienko as security porter

== Production ==
The script by James Mitchell is based on his original TV pilot "A Magnum for Schneider" and the novelization thereof, Red File for Callan, although only the novel is listed in the film's credits (as A Red File for Callan). The film was based more on the novel than on the original television script.

Callan's boss Hunter is played by Eric Porter, and Meres too is re-cast, this time played by Peter Egan. The only recurring actors from the TV series were Edward Woodward as Callan, Russell Hunter as Lonely, and Clifford Rose as Dr Snell. Carl Mohner was cast as Schnider due to the original 1967 TV Movie actor Joseph Furst moving to Australia in 1972.

Callan was the first film with a Dolby-encoded optical soundtrack.

The film was shot in late 1973 at Lee Studios and on locations such as the Spint Crossing at Newbury. Director Don Sharp called it "a joy to film" in part because Woodward's "character was so set but he came to it so fresh again." "We're making a much more extended approach than the TV series," said Woodward during filming. "We could have easily fallen into the trap of making an elongated TV series, but we didn't want it to look cheap. But we mustn't close the claustrophic tight atmosphere that made it so effective and true to life."

Sharp said the film received "lovely notices".

== Critical reception ==
The Monthly Film Bulletin wrote: "Don Sharp has constructed an unambitious but none the less powerful and convincing little thriller. Apart from one lapse (a slowed-down negative reversal of Callan dealing a death-blow to a heavy), his direction is spare and efficient, managing to combine fear and humour, especially in an inspired car-chase where Callan plays a cat-and-mouse game across the countryside with Schneider. As he takes a short-cut through a farmyard, his path is unexpectedly blocked by a large greenhouse: "Bloody hell!" yells Callan momentarily hesitating, and proceeds to bulldoze it down. The performances are uniformly good, topped by Edward Woodward in the title role, totally at one with the character, and as tight-lipped and uncompromising as ever."

The Observer called it "surprisingly enjoyable".

The Guardian said it "amounts to little more, nor much less, than an episode of the telly series writ large."

The Radio Times Guide to Films gave the film 3/5 stars, writing: "In 1967, James Mitchell turned his novel A Red File for Callan into an Armchair Theatre production called A Magnum for Schneider. This movie expands that play to feature-length status to cash in on the success of the popular TV series. The film is disappointingly slow off the mark, but thanks to Don Sharp's slick direction, the pace eventually begins to pick up, with Edward Woodward excelling as the ex-agent whose ruthless professionalism belies a highly developed conscience."

Leslie Halliwell said: "Expanded rewrite of the first episode of a long-running TV series, quite fresh and vivid in the circumstances, especially as it comes at the tail end of ten years of similar bouts of blood and thunder."
