= Yuri Borienko =

Polish actor and wrestler (1930–1999)

- Born: Jan Bolesław Kadlubowski; 27 October 1930; Malawa, Poland
- Died: 10 February 1999 (aged 68); Vancouver, British Columbia, Canada
- Years active: 1966–1987

Yuri Borienko (born Jan Bolesław Kadlubowski, 27 October 1930 – 10 February 1999) was a Polish wrestler and actor, known for his performance as Blofeld's henchman Grunther in the James Bond film On Her Majesty's Secret Service.

== Biography ==
Borienko travelled to America in 1956, possibly beginning his wrestling career there. He returned to Britain in 1960, where he worked for independent promoters before being signed up by Joint Promotions in 1962. His ring name was derived from Russian cosmonaut Yuri Gagarin and another wrestler called Stanislaus Borienko. Up until the end of the decade, the wrestler could be seen touring regularly in the rings of Southern England, pitted against other heavyweights, disappearing at times to appear in television and movie productions. (Borienko and fellow wrestler Mike Marino were matched against American heavyweight Luther Lindsay.)

Working as an actor, Borienko guested in episodes of British TV series including Adam Adamant Lives!, Z-Cars, The Troubleshooters, Department S, The Persuaders!, Jason King, The Protectors, Raffles, The Professionals and Strangers as well as a number of films (see below).

After retiring from acting, Borienko and his family moved to Canada where he spent the final 11 years of his life running a motel, dying in 1999 from leukaemia. His children include Jas Kadlubowski, businessman Stefan Kadlubowski (1963–2016) and makeup artist Nina Westbury.

== James Bond ==
During his audition for the role of James Bond in On Her Majesty's Secret Service, George Lazenby was required to spar with Borienko as part of his screen test. During this, Lazenby, unaware of how to pull his punches, struck the wrestler, giving him a broken and bloodied nose. This impressed the director Peter R. Hunt and producer Harry Saltzman, securing Lazenby the role of Bond. Borienko was given the role of Grunther as compensation for the incident.

== Filmography ==
Year	Title	Role	Notes
1966	The Trygon Factor	Nailet	
1967	Smashing Time	Gangster Entering Party	
1968	Great Catherine	Henchman	Uncredited
1969	On Her Majesty's Secret Service	Grunther	
1970	Doctor in Trouble	Sick Russian	
1972	Innocent Bystanders	Guard #1	
1974	Callan	Porter	
1974	S*P*Y*S	Yuri	
1983	The Jigsaw Man	Russian trainer	
1987	Superman IV: The Quest for Peace	Russian General - Red Square	(final film role)
