= Confessional (TV series) =

- Genre: Drama; Thriller; Espionage
- Based on: Confessional by Jack Higgins
- Written by: James Mitchell
- Directed by: Gordon Flemyng
- Starring: Robert Lindsay; Keith Carradine; Simon Chandler; Robert Lang; Valentina Yakunina; Arthur Brauss; David de Keyser; Stephen Holland; Helen Rappaport; Niall Toibin
- Composer: John Cacavas
- Country of origin: United Kingdom
- Original language: English
- No. of series: 1
- No. of episodes: 4

Production
- Producers: Gordon Flemying; Richard Everitt
- Running time: 52 minutes
- Production company: Granada Television

Original release
- Network: ITV
- Release: 4 October – 25 October 1989

Confessional is a British espionage thriller television miniseries starring Robert Lindsay, Keith Carradine, Simon Chandler, Robert Lang, Valentina Yakunina and Arthur Brauss. This series based on the 1985 spy novel of the same name by Jack Higgins and adapted for the television by James Mitchell and directed by Gordon Flemyng, it was produced by Granada Television for the ITV network and originally aired in four parts from 4 to 25 October 1989. The plot follows a rogue terrorist turned Soviet assassin, code named Cuchulain, trying to prevent a peace agreement between the parties involved in Northern Ireland.

== Cast ==
- Robert Lindsay as Thomas Kelly
- Keith Carradine as Liam Devlin
- Simon Chandler as Fox
- Robert Lang as Brigadier Charles Ferguson
- Valentina Yakunina as Tanya Maslovskaya
- Arthur Brauss as General Maslovsky
- David de Keyser as Professor Cherny
- Stephen Holland as Davey
- Helen Rappaport as Major Belova
- Niall Toibin as Sean Gallagher
- Hugo Conlon as Irish Newsreader
- Colum Convey as Billy
- Tony Hawkins as English Newsreader
- Peter Majer as Levin
- Michael John Paliotti as Father Michael Kelly
- Anthony Quayle as The Pope
- Catherine Rabett as Jane Barclay

== Episodes ==
No.	Title	Directed by	Written by	Original release date	UK viewers (millions)
1	"Episode 1"	Gordon Flemyng	James Mitchell	4 October 1989	N/A
In American two young men meet and become friends. One is Irish/American Liam Devlin, the other is Irish/Russian Thomas Kelly. Their destinies take them to Ireland, where their friendship is put to the test.
2	"Episode 2"	Gordon Flemyng	James Mitchell	11 October 1989	N/A
Irish-American Liam Devlin has been blackmailed by British Intelligence to track down a Russian assassin. The only person in the West who can identify him is a young Russian woman, Tanya Maslovskaya. He killed her father. Subsequently she was adopted by Ivan Maslovksy. Tanya is now a famous concert pianist currently performing in Paris. Devlin is told to persuade her to defect.
3	"Episode 3"	Gordon Flemyng	James Mitchell	18 October 1989	N/A
Irish-American Liam Devlin has persuaded Russian concert pianist Tanya Maslovskaya to defect in order to identify a Russian assassin who is operating in Ireland. When the killer learns of her arrival he tries to stop her.
4	"Episode 4"	Gordon Flemyng	James Mitchell	25 October 1989	N/A
Tanya, a defecting Russian pianist, has helped Liam Devlin to identify a Russian assassin. But before the man can be arrested her escapes from Ireland to England to seek revenge on all those he believes have betrayed him.
