= Russell Hunter =

Scottish actor (1925–2004)

- Hunter as "Lonely" in Callan
- Born: Russell Ellis; 18 February 1925; Glasgow, Scotland
- Died: 26 February 2004 (aged 79); Edinburgh, Scotland
- Occupation: Actor
- Spouse(s): Marjorie Thomson (m. 1949–19??); Caroline Blakiston (m. 1970; div. 19??) Una McLean (m. 1991)
- Children: 4

Adam Russell Hunter (18 February 1925 – 26 February 2004) was a Scottish television, stage and film actor. He played Lonely in the TV thriller series Callan, starring Edward Woodward, and shop steward Harry in the Yorkshire Television sitcom The Gaffer (1981–1983) with Bill Maynard. He made guest appearances in television series such as The Sweeney, Doctor Who, Taggart, A Touch of Frost, The Bill and The Return of Sherlock Holmes in The Adventure of Silver Blaze.

== Life ==
Born Russell Ellis in Glasgow, Hunter's childhood was spent with his maternal grandparents in Lanarkshire, until returning to his unemployed father and cleaner mother when he was 12. He went from school to an apprenticeship in a Clydebank shipyard. During this time, he did some amateur acting for the Young Communist League before turning professional in 1946.

== Career ==
=== Early work ===
Under the stage name Russell Hunter, he acted at Perth Rep and at the Glasgow Unity Theatre also performing in the very first Edinburgh Festival Fringe in 1947 in The Plough and the Stars by Seán O'Casey, was a comedian in summer variety shows and toured with a one-man show.

Hunter worked in repertory theatre and Scottish variety before making his film debut in Lilli Marlene (1950). In the same year, he appeared in the film The Gorbals Story, which featured members of the Glasgow Unity Theatre including Archie Duncan and Roddy McMillan. The film also featured Hunter's first wife, Marjorie Thomson. He followed these by playing a pilot in the Battle of Britain drama Angels One Five in 1951.

His theatre work included joining Peter Hall's Royal Shakespeare Company, working with Peggy Ashcroft and Dame Edith Evans. and appearing in Charlie’s Aunt at the Bristol Old Vic in 1964-5.

=== Callan ===
Hunter as Lonely in a prison scene from Callan

Hunter portrayed the timid, smelly, petty criminal Lonely, unlikely accomplice to a clinical spy-cum-assassin, in the downbeat 1967 television spy series Callan. Reportedly, he said of his identification with Lonely that "I take more baths than I might have playing other parts. When Lonely was in the public eye I used only the very best toilet water and a hell of a lot of aftershave."

After playing Costard in a BBC television production of Love's Labour's Lost (1965), Hunter was cast as Lonely in ITV's "Armchair Theatre" production A Magnum for Schneider in 1967, which introduced the secret agent Callan to the screen. Four series followed (1967, 1969–72). Hunter and Edward Woodward reprised their roles in both a 1974 feature film of the same name and, seven years later, in the television film Wet Job, by which time Lonely had gone straight, got married and was running a plumbing company called Fresh and Fragrant. The title plays on "wet job", the euphemism for murder or assassination.

=== Other roles ===
During his years with Callan, Hunter acted in the Hammer horror film Taste the Blood of Dracula (1970) and took the roles of Crumbles, Dr Fogg and Dr Makepeace in an ITV production of Sweeney Todd (1970), He also appeared in the British comedy film Up Pompeii (1971) as the Jailer.

He had two appearances in one-man plays performed on BBC Scotland in the early 1970s: Cocky, where he played Henry Cockburn, Lord Cockburn, which ended with his speech to the jury defending Helen McDougal, Burke's wife, in the Burke and Hare case, and Jock, where he played an archetypal Scottish soldier guarding a military museum. In 1974 he played Ted, a simple-minded but kind-hearted man in a two-part story in Rooms, two-part dramas concerning the various drifters who rent rooms in a lodging house. He played 'Old Fred' in a 1974 episode of Thriller. In 1975 he played a Scottish painter in the BBC's adaptation of the Lord Peter Wimsey story The Five Red Herrings. In 1979, at the artist's request, he opened the Edinburgh Festival Exhibition of the Glasgow artist Stewart Bowman Johnson held at the Netherbow Gallery.

Hunter's other TV credits include The Sweeney (as a gay petty criminal and informant, Popeye, very similar to his Callan character Lonely), Ace of Wands (as the evil magician Mr Stabs, a role that Hunter twice reprised in episodes of two anthology series Shadows and Dramarama), Doctor Who serial The Robots of Death (1977), Farrington of the F.O., The Bill, A Touch of Frost, Taggart, sitcoms Rule Britannia (1975) as the Scotsman Jock McGregor and shop steward in The Gaffer (1981–83), and his last ever TV appearance, in the BBC drama Born and Bred. In his last years he reprised his Doctor Who role for a series of audio plays released on CD, Kaldor City. He also appeared in an episode of Mind Your Language as a minor character in the episode "I Belong To Glasgow"; he played an opinionated chauffeur who kept clashing with the students. He also appeared in the TV sitcom Lovejoy as a Scottish submariner in the episode "Angel Trousers". In his native Scotland, he was the central character in a long-running series of TV commercials in the early 1990s sponsored by the Law Society of Scotland in which he declared "it's never too early to call your solicitor".

He also appeared as different characters in the pilot and series of the BBC sitcom Rab C. Nesbitt.

== Theatre ==
Year	Title	Role	Company	Director	Notes
1971	Confessions of a Justified Sinner	James Hogg	Lyceum Theatre, Edinburgh	Richard Eyre	Edinburgh International Festival

== Filmography ==
Year	Title	Role	Notes
1950	The Gorbals Story	Johnnie Martin	
1950	Lilli Marlene	Scottie	
1952	Angels One Five	Pimpernel Pilot	
1952	The Brave Don't Cry	Police Sergeant	
1970	Taste the Blood of Dracula	Felix	
1971	Up Pompeii	Jailer	
1974	Callan	Lonely	
1975	Five Red Herrings	Matthew Gowan	Lord Peter Wimsey (TV series), 3 episodes
1977	Doctor Who	Commander Uvanov	Serial: The Robots of Death
1979	Mind Your Language	Jock	Episode: "I Belong to Glasgow"
1981	Never Say Die!		
1984	The Masks of Death	Alfred Coombs	TV movie
1986	The Christmas Star	Old McNickle	
1988	The Play on One	Ian Sinclair	Episode: "The Dunroamin' Rising"
1992	Lovejoy	Harry Mackie	Episode: Angel Trousers
1992	Shooting Elizabeth	De-Miguel	Movie
1996	The Detectives	Spanner	Episode: The Great Escaper
2003	American Cousins	Nonno	
2003	Skagerrak	Priest	

== Personal life ==
In 1949, Hunter married Marjorie Thomson and had two daughters. In 1970, he married actress Caroline Blakiston after they both appeared in A Midsummer Night's Dream at the Open Air Theatre, Regent's Park. They had a son and a daughter. His third marriage, in 1991, was to fellow performer Una McLean. They lived in a converted building at Taylor Gardens in Leith.

=== Illness ===
Although in the advanced stages of cancer, Hunter's last theatrical stint was in the Reginald Rose play 12 Angry Men at the same, if inconceivably expanded, Edinburgh Festival Fringe, with which he had remained inextricably linked.

Despite being ill, Hunter received positive reviews for his appearances in the feature film American Cousins late in 2003 and as a priest in the film Skagerrak. In November, American Cousins, Hunter's last movie role, received the Special Jury Prize at the Savannah Film Festival in the United States, ending a career spanning six decades.

=== Death ===
Russell Hunter died aged 79 at Edinburgh's Western General Hospital of lung cancer.
