= James Mitchell (writer) =

British writer (1926–2002)

- Born: James William Mitchell; 12 March 1926; South Shields, England
- Died: 15 September 2002 (aged 76); Newcastle-upon-Tyne, England
- Occupations: Screenwriter, novelist
- Writing career
- Pen name: Patrick O. McGuire; James Munro
- Years active: 1957–2002
- Notable works: Callan; When the Boat Comes In

James William Mitchell (12 March 1926, in South Shields – 15 September 2002, in Newcastle-upon-Tyne) was a British writer, principally of crime fiction and spy thrillers. He is best known for creating Callan (1967–1972) and When the Boat Comes In (1976–1981).

== Biography ==
The son of a shipyard worker, Mitchell also wrote under the pseudonyms James Munro and Patrick O. McGuire. He received BA and MA degrees from Oxford. After graduating he tried numerous jobs, including shipyard worker and civil servant before taking up teaching, in his own words he taught, "for some 15 years in almost every kind of institution from secondary modern school to college of art". In 1968 Mitchell moved to London to concentrate on writing.

Mitchell created the ITV spy thriller Callan, starring Edward Woodward as a remorseful secret service assassin, and the BBC period drama When the Boat Comes In, starring James Bolam as a World War I veteran returning to his Tyneside hometown. These programmes proved to be his most notable, and acclaimed work.

He also wrote many other television scripts, including episodes of The Troubleshooters, the legal drama Justice and The Avengers.

== Personal life and death ==
He married twice and had two children. Mitchell died in Newcastle upon Tyne on 15 September 2002. He was 76.

== Bibliography ==
=== Novels ===
- Here's a Villain! (1957), US Title: The Lady is Waiting
- A Way Back (1959), also published as: The Way Back
- Steady, Boys, Steady (1960)
- Among Arabian Sands (1963)
- Ilion Like a Mist (1969), also published as: Venus in Plastic
- The Winners (1970)
- The Evil Ones (1982)
- KGB Kill (1987)
- A Woman to Be Loved (1990)
- An Impossible Woman (1992)
- Leading Lady (1993)
- So Far from Home (1995)
- Indian Summer (1996)
- Dance for Joy (1997)

=== Callan ===
- A Magnum for Schneider (1969), US Title: A Red File for Callan
- Russian Roulette (1973)
- Death and Bright Water (1974)
- Smear Job (1975)
- Bonfire Night (2002)
- Callan Uncovered (2014) and Callan Uncovered 2 (2015) - short story collections edited by Mike Ripley

=== When the Boat Comes In ===
- When the Boat Comes In
- When the Boat Comes In: The Hungry Years
- When the Boat Comes In: Upwards and Onwards

=== Ron Hogget ===
- Sometimes You Could Die (1985)
- Dead Ernest (1986)
- Dying Day (1988)

=== as Patrick O. McGuire ===
- A Time for Murder (1955)
- Fiesta for Murder (1962)

=== as James Munro ===
- The Man Who Sold Death (1964)
- Die Rich, Die Happy (1965)
- The Money That Money Can't Buy (1967)
- The Innocent Bystanders (1969)

The hero in his Munro books is a British agent named John Craig, who works, mostly reluctantly, for Department K. Mitchell wrote the screenplay for the 1972 film version of The Innocent Bystanders under his real name.

== Filmography ==
=== Film ===
Year	Title	Credit	Notes
1970	The Last Grenade	Screenplay	
1972	Innocent Bystanders	Screenplay	Adapted from his "James Munro" novel
1974	Callan	Screenplay	Adapted from his novel, "A Red File for Callan"

=== Television ===
Year	Title	Credit	Notes
1960, 1964	Armchair Mystery Theatre	Writer	Episodes: "Flight from Treason" and "The Lonely Crime"
1961, 1963	The Avengers	Writer	5 episodes
1961	Kraft Mystery Theater	Writer	Episode: "Flight from Treason"
1961, 1967	Armchair Theatre	Writer	Episodes: "The Omega Mystery" and "A Magnum for Schneider" (the latter served as a backdoor pilot for Callan)
1965	Crane	Writer	Episode: "The Man in the Gold Waistcoat"
1965–1967	The Troubleshooters	Writer	5 episodes
1966	This Man Craig	Writer	Episodes: "Live Like a Man" and "Fresh Off the Boat"
1968	Frontier	Writer	Episode: "His Lordship"
1967–1972	Callan	Creator and writer	Wrote 18 episodes
1971–1972	Justice	Writer	6 episodes
1976–1981	When the Boat Comes In	Creator and writer	Wrote 39 episodes
1981	Goodbye Darling	Creator and writer	Wrote 8 episodes
1981	Wet Job	Writer	TV movie, sequel to Callan
1983	Spyship	Writer	6 episodes
1989	Confessional	Writer	4 episodes
