= Callan (TV series) =

British TV spy series (1967–1972)

- Genre: Drama; Spy thriller; Action-adventure
- Created by: James Mitchell
- Starring: Edward Woodward; Russell Hunter; Anthony Valentine; Ronald Radd; Michael Goodliffe; Derek Bond; William Squire; Clifford Rose; Patrick Mower; Geoffrey Chater; Lisa Langdon
- Country of origin: United Kingdom
- No. of series: 4
- No. of episodes: 44 (of which 10 missing) (list of episodes)

Production
- Running time: 50 minutes per episode approx. (60 with adverts)
- Production companies: ABC Weekend TV (S1–2); Thames Television (S3–4); ATV (Wet Job)

Original release
- Network: ITV
- Release: 8 July 1967 – 24 May 1972

Callan is a British spy action drama television series created by James Mitchell, first airing between 1967 and 1972.

It starred Edward Woodward as David Callan, an agent of a state secret service dealing with internal security threats to the United Kingdom. Though portrayed as having responsibilities similar to those of the real-life MI5, Callan's fictional "Section" has carte blanche to use the most ruthless of methods. In the storylines, interrogation is by means of torture, while extrajudicial killings are so routine, they have a colour-coded filing system.

Despite being an assassin who stays in the socially isolating job because it is the only thing he is good at, Callan is a sympathetic character by comparison to his often-sadistic upper-class colleagues and implacable superiors. The downbeat cover for the Section's headquarters was a scrap-metal business in a former school, belonging to "Charlie Hunter"—an alias inherited by each of Callan’s superiors.

Produced by ABC Weekend TV and Thames Television, the programme proved extremely popular; in addition to four series between 1967 and 1972, a feature-length film was released in 1974, and a TV film produced by Associated Television in 1981 was aired.

== Characters ==
	Television			Film
	'A Magnum for Schneider'	Regular Series	'Wet Job'	"Callan"
David Callan	Edward Woodward			
Lonely	Russell Hunter			
Hunter	Ronald Radd	Ronald Radd, Michael Goodliffe, Derek Bond, William Squire	Hugh Walters	Eric Porter
Liz (Hunter's Secretary)	Judy Champ (voice only)	Lisa Langdon	Felicity Harrison	Veronica Lang
Toby Meres	Peter Bowles	Anthony Valentine		Peter Egan
Dr. Snell		Clifford Rose		Clifford Rose
James Cross		Patrick Mower		
Bishop		Geoffrey Chater		

- David Callan (Series 1–4): his name is a pseudonym, as when meeting with an old acquaintance, he remarks (in the episode "Where Else Could I Go?") that he knew him by a different name during their military service together. He often uses the alias David Tucker, who is officially in the scrap-metal business, but is also a qualified bookkeeper, which he uses both to support himself when not working for the Section and occasionally in undercover work. From a working-class background, he was born in London, an only child whose parents were both killed towards the end of World War II in a V2 rocket attack. He served as a National Serviceman in the British Army during the Malayan Emergency with the Green Howards, attained the rank of corporal, and saved his company commander's life, winning a medal, but twice being demoted from corporal for fighting with a sergeant and arguing with a colonel. The said officer, Colonel Pringle, who was later promoted to brigadier, sacked Callan from the army when they were back in peacetime conditions, and Pringle later remarked that Callan was too much of an individualist for the army, that Callan always questioned orders and had twice been demoted from corporal. Pringle also remarked that Callan was unequalled as a killer. Afterwards, Callan became a bank robber, but was caught on one job, served two years in Wormwood Scrubs prison, and was subsequently recruited by the Section. He served in Hong Kong and Beirut, where he became romantically involved with a woman who was shot and killed in his arms by an enemy agent. He is a crack shot, normally preferring a (fictional) snub-nosed Nogouchi .357 Magnum revolver and a karate expert, demonstrating the ability to kill an opponent with his bare hands using only three blows. He is a skilled burglar and safe cracker, although not as good at this as Lonely, whose expert help he regularly requires. Callan speaks fluent Russian. He drinks whisky with Hunter and keeps gin and light ale at his flat. He is appalled by his work for the Section and regularly worries and wonders about the people whom he has killed, although he seems to accept it as a necessary evil of the Cold War, feeling that not only has he no choice, but also that it is what he is genuinely good at. His social life largely consists of military history and collecting militaria like model soldiers, and spending his free time with other collectors and enthusiasts, with his speciality being the Napoleonic period. When distraught, he gets drunk with Lonely and confesses to witnessing another soldier ruthlessly shooting down the enemy in an ambush during the Malayan Emergency, vowing to become just like him to survive.
- Lonely (Series 1–4): his real name is never revealed. (In Series 2, Episode 13, one character addresses Lonely as "Mr Bellamy". When visiting him in jail, Callan calls Lonely "Arthur". However, given his nature, they may not be his real names.) He is a small-time thief, former forger and burglar and has been since childhood. He has an aunt who is his "fence" and runs a snack bar in a market along with her statuesque son called Wellington and an unnamed friend who is a blind beggar. Lonely earns his nickname due to bouts of extreme body odour which is psychosomatic and occurs when he is frightened, which is often when in Callan's presence. He is an expert at surveillance and burglary and is Callan's link to criminal resources such as an underworld doctor ("The Groper") and black-market weapons (although he personally dislikes guns intensely). He takes various straight jobs throughout the series, such as a lavatory attendant at a strip club, but the Section eventually arranges a career for him as a black cab driver, both in its service and to support himself (and keep out of trouble) between assignments. He and Callan met in Wormwood Scrubs prison where Callan defended the vulnerable Lonely from other more violent criminals. Although they seem to genuinely care for one another, Lonely always refers to him as "Mr Callan" and is perpetually afraid of him. Callan never actually tells Lonely the nature of his work although it is hinted at that Lonely suspects him to be more than just an everyday gangster, notably when he aids Callan in helping a KGB agent escape from prison. He likes his tea "interfered with" (meaning laced with whisky) and enjoys gambling.
- Hunter (Series 1–4): head of the Section. Five different men, including Callan himself, have served in the position over the course of the series. Although their personalities differ, they share several traits, such as callousness and a tendency for secretiveness and manipulation. Despite their ruthlessness, they tend to tread carefully around Callan, knowing that if they push him too far, he will retaliate with not-inconsiderable force.
- Liz (Series 1–4): secretary of the various Hunters. It is revealed that she was a survivor of a Nazi massacre in Poland as a child and was adopted by a British intelligence officer, which eventually led her into being recruited by the Section. She and Callan seem fond of one another but their relationship appears to be wholly professional.
- Toby Meres (Series 1–2, 4): an upper class agent who attended Eton school followed by Oxford University and then the Brigade of Guards, recruited by the Section after being forced to leave the army because he caused the death of one of his men. He wears distinctive blue glasses, uses a .38 Special and spent a year attached to the CIA as the Section's Washington representative. Meres is highly ambitious and enjoys his work with the Section, a quality that Hunter finds very useful but which irritates the sentimental Callan no end. Meres has an adversarial relationship with Callan, but he respects Callan's abilities and works very effectively in a team with him.
- Dr Snell (Series 2–4): a sinister and seemingly emotionless doctor who works for the Section. As well as standard medical care, he is involved in the psychological evaluation of Section personnel, the mental torture of Section prisoners and even brainwashing a criminal so that he forgets witnessing Callan kill one of his henchmen.
- James Cross (Series 3–4): a replacement agent for Toby Meres (who had been posted to the US) and Callan's rival within the Section. He is ambitious and extremely ruthless, bordering on the sadistic, although more reckless than Meres. Cross drives a white Jaguar, drinks whisky, smokes cigarettes and uses a snub-nosed .38 calibre revolver. He has a casual affair with Hunter's secretary, Liz, and later kills the Nazi war criminal who tried to murder her by throwing him out of a window, although Callan opines this was purely to save his own career (possibly as a ruse to prompt Liz into ending their destructive relationship). Whilst Callan is on friendly terms with the other members of the Section, he and Cross share a mutual antipathy that borders on hatred, Cross even disagreeing with Hunter's decision to trade the captured KGB agent Richmond in return for rescuing an imprisoned Callan from behind the Iron Curtain.
- Bishop (Series 3–4): a civil servant, and Hunter's superior.

== Series overview ==
The series pilot episode aired in February 1967, in an Armchair Theatre play entitled A Magnum for Schneider by James Mitchell. Mitchell was later responsible for creating When the Boat Comes In (1976–81) for the BBC. The haunted character of Callan caught the public's imagination to such an extent that a six-episode series was commissioned and broadcast, later in the same year. A further series of 16 followed, though with both ABC and Associated Rediffusion (broadcasters in the London region) going through the process of merging, by the time the second series was broadcast in 1969 it was attributed to Thames Television (the result of the merger).

Overall, the series was successful in the television ratings, running between 1967 and 1972. The closing episode of the 1969 series saw a severely under-pressure Callan get shot, with a clever publicity campaign following to ensure that viewers cared whether the character lived (he did) or died. The last two series were in colour and proved as popular as ever. A cinema film simply entitled Callan followed in 1974, directed by Don Sharp. Callan was last seen in the 1981 feature-length television story made by ATV, entitled Wet Job. Though less satisfactory than the preceding series, it was a chance for viewers to see the main characters of Callan and Lonely one more time.

=== Colour-coded files ===
The Section used a series of colour-coded files to indicate targets of different priorities (with much relevance for the title of the novel Red File for Callan);

Red File	Dangerous targets of most urgent priority, marked for death
Yellow File	A subject under occasional surveillance
Blue File	Members of the 'wrong' party
White File	People to be put out of action by sending them into divorce courts, bankruptcy, prison or mental homes

== Episodes ==
The original TV play was screened in 1967 as part of ITV's Armchair Theatre series. This was followed by a first series of six episodes, a second series of fifteen episodes, a third series of nine episodes and a fourth series of thirteen episodes (in all, 22 black-and-white and 22 colour episodes). These were supplemented by a 1974 colour film re-working of the pilot, A Magnum for Schneider, .and a 1981 feature-length TV movie, Wet Job.

=== Pilot: A Magnum for Schneider (1967) ===
Callan has been retired from an anonymous government agency known as "the Section", run by Colonel Hunter (the name "Hunter" is used as a code name for the current Section Chief, similar to the C of SIS). The Section removes those who pose a danger to the public, by means of either persuasion, blackmail, extortion or death. David Callan had been the Section's top operative, but had become too curious about his targets and the rationale for their removal. The Section considered him vulnerable, volatile and dangerous, so had laid him off to a dead-end book-keeping job with an ungrateful employer.

The pilot was novelised by its scriptwriter, James Mitchell, who went on to write most of the TV series episodes. The book was published under the title Red File For Callan in the US, and as A Magnum for Schneider in the UK, the storyline being based around Callan's love for model soldier war games, an interest shared by his target, Schneider, a Hampstead-based arms dealer.

The pilot, filmed in black-and-white, was later remade in colour in 1974 as the feature film, Callan, two years after the television series ended.

=== Series 1: 6 episodes (1967) ===
ABC commissioned a first series of six episodes in 1967. In the first episode Callan rejoins the section in an unofficial capacity. The series was characterised by Callan's stand-offish, barely-respectful relationship with his boss, Hunter, who schemed to retain Callan on his side, and would play him off in little divide-and-rule scenarios with or against his fellow agents. This was in an effort to maintain his control, although it wasn't always apparent that these ploys worked. Callan's underworld contact, Lonely (Russell Hunter), developed into an unofficial sidekick, whose shadowing qualities outshone his sense of personal hygiene, something Meres in particular took joy in pointing out. Lonely remained ignorant of Callan's real work and believed him to be something of a gangland villain.

=== Series 2: 15 episodes (1969) ===
By 1969, ABC Weekend Television had, due to an enforced merger with Rediffusion, become Thames Television. A second series of 15 episodes, which had already been completed by ABC, was therefore transmitted under the name of the new company. This run ended with "Death of a Hunter", in which the Section chief meets his demise, and Callan is shot – perhaps fatally. It had not been decided whether the show would return for a third series, so this device was used to leave open either the possibility of more stories in the future, or a way of winding-up the show. Two endings were taped, in which Callan either lived or died. In the end, Thames decided to bring the programme back in 1970, this time in colour, for a series consisting of a further nine episodes.

=== Series 3: 9 episodes (1970) ===
The third series, the first in colour, saw Callan still recovering from having been shot and struggling to come to terms with his situation. Interviews with Snell (the Section's doctor) and poor shooting range results portrayed Callan as a barely-functioning human being, whose future with the Section looks to be in serious doubt. If Callan is to be of any use to Hunter, something has to spark him into life. In league with Meres' younger, brasher, edgier and unpredictable replacement, James Cross (played by Patrick Mower), the new Hunter concocts a scenario whereby Callan's energies are incited into real emotions that can be turned against the enemy. The remaining eight episodes see the revitalised yet ever-more world-weary assassin cover more ground, including one episode where love comes unexpectedly into his life, and which has the (expected) unexpected ending.

=== Series 4: 13 episodes (1972) ===
The final set of thirteen episodes was broadcast in 1972. This saw Callan develop further than before. An unsuccessful mission results in Callan being interrogated in a Russian prison but he is exchanged by the Soviets for one of their agents. Now he is known to them, he has become a liability. What to do with The Section's top agent is solved by promoting him to the position of Hunter – a post he dislikes as much or even more than actually serving under a Hunter. However, this move by his masters has motives, and he is eventually relieved of his duties after an incident in which he re-enters the fray as an agent, which was against the rules. He is replaced as Hunter by his predecessor. The final three episodes form a trilogy based around the defecting Soviet agent Richmond (played by T. P. McKenna), which was sub-titled The Richmond Files.

=== Reunion TV movie: Wet Job (1981) ===
The 1981 feature-length television story Wet Job, written by Mitchell and produced by ATV (without the original theme music or logo), rounded off the saga with a positive ending to the story of Callan and Lonely. Callan has become the proprietor of a military memorabilia shop when he is recruited by the new Hunter for one more job. Alas, he has to do this alone: Lonely has become a dapper gent, engaged to be married, and with enough self-confidence to defy Callan's request for help. Callan gives Lonely a Krugerrand as a wedding present. As the nemesis, George Sewell becomes the last character to be shot by Callan. In the end, Callan completes the task, survives, feels used again, and even ends up with a mature girlfriend (played by Angela Browne).

=== Documentary: This Man Alone (2015) ===
A Callan documentary entitled This Man Alone was released on DVD in November 2015. Narrated by Edward Woodward's son Peter Woodward, it includes contributions from Peter Mitchell, Reginald Collin, Mike Vardy, and James Goddard. Additionally the DVD includes a new transfer of A Magnum for Schneider and The Good Ones Are All Dead, a music-themed TV special The Edward Woodward Hour, and a documentary on James Mitchell, A World of My Own.

== In other media ==
=== Film – Callan (1974) ===
The cinema film was an expanded re-working of James Mitchell's original 1967 TV pilot episode, A Magnum for Schneider. Taking much of its new material from Mitchell's own novelisation of that teleplay, it was based more on the novel than on the original television script. For legal reasons, no mention is made of the pilot teleplay or the TV series. The film's credits mention only the novel as its source, identifying it by the title under which it had been published by Simon & Schuster in the United States in 1969, Red File for Callan, so as to avoid any reference to the title of the ABC television pilot.

In 1974, Dell reissued the novel in paperback, as Red File for Callan. Despite coinciding with the film's release this edition gave no hint of being a tie-in.

In the film, Callan's boss Hunter is played by Eric Porter, and Meres too is re-cast, this time played by Peter Egan (known at the time as a trendy gangster, from the controversial TV series Big Breadwinner Hog, but now better known for sitcoms such as the BBC's Ever Decreasing Circles). The only recurring actors from the TV series were Edward Woodward as Callan, Russell Hunter as Lonely, and Clifford Rose as Dr Snell (who appears in five of the television episodes from series two, three and four, although, in the film, reflecting the screenplay's 1967 origin, it's stated that Callan has never met Snell before).

=== Novels ===
- A Magnum for Schneider by James Mitchell – also published as Red File for Callan and Callan – (1969), ISBN 0-750-53959-3
- Russian Roulette (1973) by James Mitchell, ISBN 1-909-61904-3
- Death and Bright Water (1974) by James Mitchell, ISBN 1-909-61911-6
- Smear Job (1975) by James Mitchell, ISBN 0-241-89306-2
- Bonfire Night (2002) by James Mitchell, ISBN 0-727-85878-5

=== Short story collections ===
There are two short story collections

- Callan Uncovered (2014) all by James Mitchell. Features 25 short stories (24 were written for the Sunday Express, and 1 for the TV Times), as well as a story treatment and the full script of an unfilmed episode, "Goodbye Mary Lee".
- Callan Uncovered 2 (2015) all by James Mitchell. Features 15 short stories (all were written for the Sunday Express), as well as the full script of a 'lost' episode, "Goodness Burns Too Bright".

=== Big Finish audio series ===
On 7 December 2017, Big Finish Productions announced plans to release two box sets of Callan audio adventures based on the Sunday Express Short Stories written by James Mitchell. The tales have been adapted by Peter Mitchell, the series creator's son, and star Ben Miles in the title role, with Frank Skinner as Lonely, Nicholas Briggs as Hunter and Jane Slavin as Liz. Volume One released July 2018. On 29 July 2020, Big Finish announced that the second volume would release in September 2020.

==== Callan: Volume 1 ====
No.	Title	Directed by	Written by	Released
1	"File on a Deadly Deadshot"	Ken Bentley	James Mitchell, adapted by Peter Mitchell	July 2018
2	"File on a Classy Club"	Ken Bentley	James Mitchell, adapted by Peter Mitchell	July 2018
3	"File on an Awesome Amateur"	Ken Bentley	James Mitchell, adapted by Peter Mitchell	July 2018
4	"File on a Harassed Hunter"	Ken Bentley	James Mitchell, adapted by Peter Mitchell	July 2018

==== Callan: Volume 2 ====
No.	Title	Directed by	Written by	Released
1	"File on a Difficult Don"	Samuel Clemens	James Mitchell, adapted by Peter Mitchell	September 2020
2	"File on a Mourning Mother"	Samuel Clemens	James Mitchell, adapted by Peter Mitchell	September 2020
3	"File on an Elusive Engineer"	Samuel Clemens	James Mitchell, adapted by Peter Mitchell	September 2020
4	"File on a Angry American"	Samuel Clemens	James Mitchell, adapted by Peter Mitchell	September 2020

== Awards and nominations ==
The following is a table listing the awards and nominations received by Callan

Year	Association	Award Category	Notes	Result
1970	BAFTA	BAFTA TV Award – Best Actor	Edward Woodward	Won
1970	BAFTA	BAFTA TV Award – Best Drama Series	Reginald Collin	Nominated
1970	BAFTA	BAFTA TV Award – Best Script	James Mitchell	Nominated
1971	BAFTA	BAFTA TV Award – Best Drama Series	Reginald Collin	Nominated

== Music ==
The series' theme tune, "Girl in the Dark" (also known as "This Man Alone"), was a library piece credited to Dutch composer Jan Stoeckart (under the penname "Jack Trombey", one of several aliases he used), issued by De Wolfe Music.

However, an edition of Billboard newspaper dated 15 November 1975 reported on the conclusion of a seven-year copyright case brought in 1968 by Mood Music (a subsidiary of the Sparta-Florida Music Group), who claimed that "Girl in the Dark" was "sufficiently similar" to an Italian song, "Sogno Nostalgico", as to be an infringement of copyright. That song was claimed to have been composed in 1963, with records of it released in Italy in 1964 which were made available from Mood Music's library in 1965. But Mood proved oddly reluctant to push the case to a trial.

The accuracy of their claim may be judged from the fact that Mood also claimed, incorrectly, that "Sogno Nostalgico" was used as the theme for the British television series The Rat Catchers, a piece of music which has always been credited to UK composer Johnny Pearson.

De Wolfe maintained that "Girl in the Dark", the work of Dutch composer Jan Stoeckart in 1960, had been submitted to other people before the copyright was assigned to them in 1966 (i.e., including a period before "Sogno Nostalgico" had been composed). A settlement was reached in 1975 once it became clear – from the 1974 feature film – that Callan was no longer using the piece, so that royalties had dried up. Copyright in it was vested by agreement in Mood Music in 1975, together with future royalties (but Callan never used it again), with De Wolfe retaining the majority of the royalties earned up to that point.

Due to the ongoing legal action, the 1974 feature film conspicuously did not use the composition " Girl in the Dark", and the terms of the settlement of the case in 1975 led to its also not being used in ATV's 1981 reunion TV movie.

Incidental music was not a feature of the Callan television series, except in "A Magnum for Schneider" where "Girl in the Dark" was repeatedly played in scenes in which Callan set to work.

== DVD releases ==
=== Callan in the archives ===
The Armchair Theatre play from 1967 exists as a 16mm film recording of the original 405-line black-and-white television broadcast.

The 21 episodes of series 1 and 2 were recorded on black-and-white videotape, with filmed inserts; but several of these episodes have been lost or wiped. The surviving episodes from Series 1 still exist as 405-line tapes, and those episodes featured on the 2015 DVD Callan: This Man Alone had proper electronic conversions to 625-line video, but the episodes have previously had poor quality optical conversions by merely pointing a 625-line electronic camera at a monitor displaying the original 405-line recording. The surviving Series 2 episodes also exist on 405-line videotapes, but for DVD these were electronically (as opposed to optically) converted. In the case of "The Worst Soldier I Ever Saw", Network's DVD cover blurb states that the episode only survives as an unedited studio block, which had to be edited into its proper sequence for the DVD release.

All of the colour episodes exist, and the 1970 series was released on DVD in the UK in 2001. The episodes were edited to remove captions which would have led into the commercial breaks in the original transmission. This resulted in some awkward visual and audio jump cuts. The subsequent British DVD releases all retain the commercial break captions. The 1974 feature film was released on DVD separately.

Both the 1970 and 1972 series have had Region 4 DVD releases by Umbrella Entertainment. The 1972 series DVD also includes the feature film.

The separate DVD release of the 1974 feature film includes an interview, recorded in 2000, with Edward Woodward.

=== Region 1 ===
Acorn Media released Callan - Set 1 on 7 July 2009 which includes all 9 episodes from series 3. On 26 January 2010, Callan - Set 2 was released featuring all 13 episodes from series 4. It has not been decided whether further series will be released to DVD in Region 1.

=== Region 2 ===
Clear Vision Video released three DVDs subtitled "Series 1 Parts 1 – 3 of 3", also available in a box titled Callan – The Complete Series One, in 2001. In fact these DVDs comprise the nine episodes of Series 3 aired in 1970, the first colour series, although the back covers incorrectly claim that "This edition comes from the first series that was ever shown on Thames Television". (ABC had aired the complete first series before changing its name in the 1968 ITV franchise round; then, renamed Thames, it had shown the second series in 1969.)

Prism Leisure released the cinema film as Callan – The Movie on Region 0 PAL in 2001. The DVD also includes an interview with Edward Woodward.

Network released Callan – The Monochrome Years in a DVD edition on 22 February 2010. This four DVD set includes the Armchair Theatre pilot play, 'A Magnum For Schnieder', plus the surviving 2 episodes of the first series (out of the original 6), and the surviving 9 episodes of the second series (out of the original 15). Network also released Callan – The Colour Years in 2010. Callan – Wet Job was then released by Network in 2011. Network were due to release the complete series, containing all the surviving episodes, The Definitive Collection, the following year, but this did not happen and eventually, in 2015, the special features announced for the set began to be released individually. This suggests that the collection has been abandoned.

=== Region 4 ===
Umbrella Entertainment released the third and fourth series on DVD in Australia in 2007. Fremantle Media then followed up with releases of Callan: The Monochrome Years (1967-1969) and The Colour Years (1970-1972) on DVD in Australia in 2010.
