= Clifford Rose =

British film and theatre actor (1929–2021)

- Born: John Clifford Rose; 24 October 1929; Hamnish Clifford, Herefordshire, England
- Died: 6 November 2021 (aged 92); Northwood, London, England
- Occupation: Actor
- Years active: 1959–2019
- Spouse: Celia Ryder (m. 1957; died 2012)
- Children: 2

John Clifford Rose (24 October 1929 – 6 November 2021) was a British actor.

== Life and career ==
Rose was born in Herefordshire. He was educated at the King's School, Worcester, and King's College London, before appearing in rep and began his association with the Royal Shakespeare Company in 1960. He played the character Sturmbannführer Ludwig Kessler in the BBC World War II television drama Secret Army (1977–79) and its sequel Kessler (1981). He later played SS General Hans Kammler in the miniseries War and Remembrance (1988). Rose played leading roles in The Pallisers (1974), Fortunes of War (1987) and Alan Bleasdale's drama GBH (1991), and appeared as Rorvik in the Doctor Who story Warriors' Gate (1981).

Rose also played a judge in some episodes of the 1970s/'80s British television series Crown Court and Dr Snell, an interrogative psychologist for "The Section" in the British 1960s/'70s spy drama Callan. He had a small part in an episode of Inspector Morse, "The Ghost in the Machine" (1989), as a college professor, Dr Charles Hudson.

Rose played King George V in the TV film Wallis and Edward (2005). In 2008, he appeared as Bishop Wood, in an episode of the ITV historical drama Foyle's War. In October 2010, Rose played the part of Father Gregory in the ITV crime drama Midsomer Murders, in the episode "Master Class". Rose played The Judge in Enid Bagnold's The Chalk Garden in a production at the Donmar Warehouse in summer 2008. A radio version of the staging was first broadcast on BBC Radio 3 in March 2011. He also played the Dean of Windsor in an episode of The Crown broadcast in 2019.

Rose was an RSC Honorary Associate Artist. He was the winner of the Clarence Derwent Award 2009 for his performance in The Chalk Garden at the Donmar.

Rose was married to Celia Ryder from 1957 until her death in 2012. They had two children, and lived in Stratford-upon-Avon. In September 2021, Rose moved into Denville Hall, a retirement home for theatrical professionals. He died there on 6 November 2021, at the age of 92.

== Selected Filmography ==
Year	Title	Role	Notes
1967	Marat/Sade	Monsieur Coulmier	Film
1968	Mystery and Imagination	Dr. Chappell	Episode: "The Listener"
1968	Tell Me Lies	Guest	Film
1968	Work Is a 4-Letter Word	Registry Office Clerk	Film
1969 – 1972	Callan	Dr. Snell	5 episodes
1970	A Family at War	Colonel	Episode: "A Lesson in War"
1970	The Roads to Freedom	Jacques	4 episodes
1970	Special Branch	Proudie	Episode: "Warrant for a Phoenix"
1971	Elizabeth R	Egerton	Episode: "Sweet England's Pride"
1971	Justice	Prison Doctor	Episode: "A Nice Straight Forward Treason"
1971	The Troubleshooters	Hildago O'Brien	Episode: "It's Thumbs Down to You Pizarro!"
1972	Follyfoot	Mr. Dockerty	Episode: "Poor Bald Head"
1972	The Main Chance	Lewis Savage	Episode: "The Next Great Train Robbery"
1972	Softly, Softly: Task Force	Joseph Gordon	Episode: "Woman's World"
1972	Van der Valk	Boersma	Episode: "One's Herring Not Enough"
1973	Justice	Mr. Chaudry-Pole	Episode: "Dummy Scoular Against the Crown"
1973	Lord Peter Wimsey	Mr. Pritchard	Serial: "The Unpleasantness at the Bellona Club" (2 episodes)
1973	The Rivals of Sherlock Holmes	Ransome	Episode: "Cell 13"
1973	Special Branch	Yearsley	Episode: "Inquisiton"
1974	Callan	Dr. Snell	Film
1974	Napoleon and Love	Emperor Francis of Austria	Episode: "The End of Love"
1974	The Pallisers	Quintus Slide	7 episodes
1974 – 1984	Crown Court	Harold Swencroft/ Dr. Alan Brierley/ His Honour Judge Herbert	8 episodes
1975	Dixon of Dock Green	Bernie Katz	Episode: "Black Monday"
1976	How Green Was My Valley	Mr. Jonas	3 episodes
1977	Rooms	Ruth's Father	3 episodes
1977	Warship	Meryon	Episode: "Wind Song"
1977	Van der Valk	De Groote	Episode: "Face Value"
1977 – 1979	Secret Army	Sturmbannführer Ludwig Kessler	38 episodes
1978	The Devil's Crown	Stephen Langton	2 episodes
1979	Turtle's Progress	Detective Inspector Mason	Episode #1.6
1980	Buccaneer	Charles Burton	13 episodes
1981	Doctor Who	Rovrik	Serial: "Warriors' Gate" (4 episodes)
1981	Kessler	Ludwig Kessler	6 episodes
1983	Bergerac	Senator Bearsley	Episode: "Come Out Fighting"
1983	Reilly, Ace of Spies	Cecil	Episode: "After Moscow"
1984	Hammer House of Mystery and Suspense	Keith Bennet	Episode: "Last Video and Testament"
1984	Minder	Cooke	Episode: "The Balance of Power"
1984	Oxbridge Blues	Sir Patrick Hankey	Episode: "Oxbridge Blues"
1984	Strangers and Brothers	Crawford	2 episodes
1985	The Good Father	Judge	Film
1985	Terry on the Fence	Magistrate	Film
1985 – 1987	One by One	Challon	5 episodes
1987	Fortunes of War	Professor Gracey	2 episodes
1987	The Girl	General Carlsson	Film
1988	Gentlemen and Players	Lightfoot	Episode: "Stags at Bay"
1988	War and Remembrance	SS Lt. Gen. Heinz Kammler	2 episodes
1989	Act of Will	Hospital Specialist	4 episodes
1989	Agatha Christie's Poirot	Makinson	Episode: "Four and Twenty Blackbirds"
1989	Inspector Morse	Dr. Charles Hudson	Episode: "The Ghost in the Machine"
1991	GBH	Judge Critchley	4 episodes
1993	Maigret	Jolivet	Episode: "Maigret and the Hotel Majestic"
1996	In Suspicious Circumstances	Colonel Warde	2 episodes
1999	Kavanagh QC	Mr. Justice Gelder	Episode: "End Game"
2001	Lover's Prayer	Dimitry	Film
2005	Wallis and Edward	King George V.	TV movie
2008	Foyle's War	Bishop Francis Wood	Episode: "Plan of Attack"
2010	Midsomer Murders	Father Gregory	Episode: "Master Class"
2011	The Iron Lady	James R	Film
2011	Pirates of the Caribbean: On Stranger Tides	Bailiff	Film
2019	The Crown	The Dean of Windsor	Episode: "Moondust"
