= Simon Chandler =

British actor (born 1953)

- Born: 1953 (age 72–73)
- Occupation: Actor
- Years active: 1976–present
- Notable work: A Bridge Too Far

Simon Chandler (born 4 June 1953 in Luton) is a British film, television and theatre actor. He often plays senior establishment figures such as Members of Parliament and senior civil servants.

== Biography ==
Born in 1953 and educated at Bedford School, Chandler's acting career began in 1976. His first film role was as Private Simmonds in Richard Attenborough's 1977 film A Bridge Too Far and he provided the voice of Merry in Ralph Bakshi's 1978 animated film adaptation of The Lord of the Rings. His most prominent recent film work includes roles in Vera Drake (2004), Perfume: The Story of a Murderer (2006), The King's Speech (2010) and The Iron Lady (2011). He starred as Ade Rutter in the first series of House of Anubis and he has taken leading roles in Judge John Deed and other television dramas, as well as prominent theatre roles.

With an acting career spanning almost forty years, his other film and television credits include roles in Angels, Another Bouquet, Coronation Street, The Duchess of Duke Street, Just William, Lillie, Jackanory Playhouse, The Taming of the Shrew, Antony & Cleopatra, Brideshead Revisited, Dead Ernest, The Merry Wives of Windsor, Lace, C.A.T.S. Eyes, The Singing Detective, Jonny Briggs, Boon, Bergerac, Confessional, The Crown, Middlemarch, The Wimbledon Poisoner, Casualty, Silent Witness, Teachers, Heartbeat, Foyle's War, Holby City, The Bill, My Family, Midsomer Murders, Doctors, Land Girls, Life Force, Silk, Vera, Mr Selfridge and Spice World.

== Partial filmography ==
- A Bridge Too Far (1977) - Private Simmonds
- The Lord of the Rings (1978) - Merry Brandybuck (voice)
- If You Go Down in the Woods Today (1981) - Lieutenant
- Victor Victoria (1982) - Chorus Boy
- The Bounty (1984) - David Nelson
- ’’Middlemarch’’ (1993) Reverend Fairbrother
- Hollow Reed (1996) - Mr. Bugler
- The Man Who Knew Too Little (1997) - Hawkins
- Incognito (1997) - Iain Hill
- Spice World (1997) - Hospital Parent
- The Commissioner (1998) - Peter Simpson
- Milk (1999) - Doctor
- The Stone Raft (2002) - Primer Ministro Ingles
- Vera Drake (2004) - Mr. Wells
- Mangal Pandey: The Rising (2005) - Lockwood
- Stoned (2005) - Mary's Father
- Perfume: The Story of a Murderer (2006) - Mayor of Grasse
- Penelope (2006) - Doctor
- Consuming Passion: 100 Years of Mills & Boon (2008) - Mr Cowpe
- The King's Speech (2010) - Lord Dawson
- The Iron Lady (2011) - Cabinet Ministers
- Fast Girls (2012) - GB Worlds Official
- Mr. Turner (2014) - Sir Augustus Wall Callcott
- The Theory of Everything (2014) - John Taylor
- The Crown (2016) - Clement Attlee
- House of the Dragon (2022–2026) - High Septon Eustace (3 episodes)
- The Diplomat (2023) - Merritt Grove MP
- Falling (2026) - Chris
