= The Spice of Life (TV series) =

- Genre: Documentary
- Directed by: Nigel Maslin; Lyn Gambles; Terry Bryan; Carlos Pasini
- Narrated by: Edward Woodward
- Country of origin: United Kingdom
- Original language: English
- No. of seasons: 1
- No. of episodes: 13

Production
- Executive producer: Jill Roach
- Producer: Blackrod Ltd.
- Editors: Bob Harvey; Colin Barrett
- Running time: 30 minutes
- Production company: Blackrod Ltd.

Original release
- Network: Channel 4
- Release: 7 September – 30 November 1983

The Spice of Life was a 13-episode television series produced by Blackrod Ltd. and aired by Channel 4 in 1983, with narration by actor Edward Woodward. Each half-hour episode covered a different cooking spice or herb, including information on how it grows and is used in various locations around the world; showing several dishes using that spice.

Executive Producer was Jill Roach, directors were Nigel Maslin, Lyn Gambles, Terry Bryan and Carlos Pasini. Editors were Bob Harvey and Colin Barrett.

== Episodes ==
Episode titles are not given on-screen, but are derived from Channel 4 press packs.

1. The Spices of India (7 Sep 1983)
2. Cinnamon (14 Sep 1983)
3. Pepper (21 Sep 1983)
4. Mustard (28 Sep 1983)
5. Cloves (5 Oct 1983)
6. Saffron (12 Oct 1983)
7. Curry Around the World (19 Oct 1983)
8. Chillies (26 Oct 1983)
9. Herbs (2 Nov 1983)
10. Garlic (9 Nov 1983)
11. More Pepper (16 Nov 1983)
12. Allspice (23 Nov 1983)
13. Nutmeg (30 Nov 1983)
