= Innocent Bystanders (film) =

1972 British film by Peter Collinson

- Original film poster
- Directed by: Peter Collinson
- Written by: James Mitchell
- Based on: The Innocent Bystanders by James Mitchell
- Produced by: George H. Brown
- Starring: Stanley Baker; Geraldine Chaplin; Donald Pleasence
- Cinematography: Brian Probyn
- Edited by: Alan Pattillo
- Music by: John Keating
- Production company: Sagittarius Productions
- Distributed by: Scotia-Barber (UK); Paramount Pictures (US)
- Release date: 23 July 1972
- Running time: 111 minutes
- Country: United Kingdom
- Language: English

Innocent Bystanders is a 1972 British spy thriller film directed by Peter Collinson that was filmed in Spain and Turkey. It stars Stanley Baker and Geraldine Chaplin. The screenplay was written by James Mitchell based on his novel The Innocent Bystanders (1969).

== Plot ==
John Craig is an aging British secret agent who is tasked with returning a defector, the Russian scientist Kaplan who has foregone science for a modest life as a goatherd in Turkey. Craig faces opposition from his boss, his younger replacements, an American secret agent, a Turkish hotel keeper, and an organization of Russian Jews hostile to Kaplan. Craig's mission is complicated by Miriam, an innocent bystander who is taken hostage.

== Cast ==
- Stanley Baker as John Craig
- Geraldine Chaplin as Miriam Loman
- Donald Pleasence as Loomis
- Dana Andrews as Blake
- Sue Lloyd as Joanna Benson
- Derren Nesbitt as Andrew Royce
- Vladek Sheybal as Aaron Kaplan
- Warren Mitchell as Omar
- Cec Linder as Mankowitz
- Howard Goorney as Zimmer
- J. G. Devlin as waiter
- Ferdy Mayne as Marcus Kaplan (dubbed by Robert Rietty)
- Clifton Jones as Hetherton
- John Collin as Asimov
- Aharon Ipalé as Gabrilovitch

== Production ==
The film was one of the last English-language features Baker made before his death.

== Reception ==
Roger Greenspun was dissatisfied with what he termed the "general inconsequence" that the script evokes. However, Greenspun expressed that Chaplin's performance was "so reticent and so appealing as to constitute a small personal triumph. She is granted the film's only moments of quiet intelligence. She fills these moments with delicate intimacy that contrasts with everything else in the film that really does suggest a reservoir of feeling to oppose the lives around her that are wasted in mere action."

Time magazine noted the standout performances of Donald Pleasence as the Head of British Intelligence and Vladek Sheybal as a minor agent.
