= Where There's a Will =

Where There's a Will may refer to:

== Film and television ==
- Where There's a Will (1936 film), a British comedy starring Will Hay
- Where There's a Will (1955 film), a British comedy starring George Cole
- "Where There's a Will" (Big Love), an episode of Big Love
- "Where There's a Will..." (Cheers), an episode of Cheers
- "Where There's a Will" (The Goodies) or "Hunting Pink", an episode of The Goodies
- Where There's a Will (Shameless), an episode of Shameless

== Literature ==
- Where There's a Will (novel), a 1940 novel by Rex Stout
- Where There's a Will, a 1912 novel by Mary Roberts Rinehart

== Music ==
- "Where There's a Will", a song by John Cale from Caribbean Sunset
- "In the Beginning There Was Rhythm / Where There's a Will...", 1980 split-single by The Pop Group and The Slits
