= Edward Woodward =

English actor (1930–2009)

Edward Woodward OBE
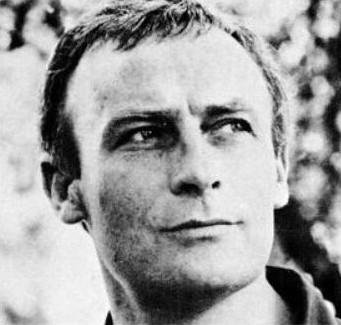
- Woodward in 1971
- Born: Edward Albert Arthur Woodward; 1 June 1930; Croydon, Surrey, England
- Died: 16 November 2009 (aged 79); Truro, Cornwall, England
- Education: Royal Academy of Dramatic Art (RADA)
- Occupations: Actor; singer
- Years active: 1946–2009
- Spouses: Venetia Barrett (m. 1952; div. 1986) Michele Dotrice (m. 1987)
- Children: 4, including Tim, Peter and Sarah

Edward Albert Arthur Woodward (1 June 1930 – 16 November 2009) was an English actor and singer. He began his career on stage, appearing in productions in both the West End of London and on Broadway in New York City. He came to wider attention in the title role of the British television spy drama Callan (1967–1972), which earned him the 1970 British Academy Television Award for Best Actor.

Woodward starred as Sergeant Neil Howie in the British folk horror film The Wicker Man (1973) and in the title role of the Australian biopic Breaker Morant (1980). From 1985 to 1989, he starred as ex-secret agent turned private investigator Robert McCall in the American television series The Equalizer, which earned him the 1986 Golden Globe Award for Best Television Drama Actor.

== Early life ==
Edward Albert Arthur Woodward was born on 1 June 1930 in Croydon, Surrey, the only child of parents Edward Oliver Woodward, a metalworker, and Violet Edith Woodward (née Smith). As a boy, he was bombed out of his home three times during the Blitz. He attended Eccleston Road, Sydenham Road, as well as Kingston Day Commercial School and Elmwood High School, Hackbridge, all in Surrey. He then attended Kingston College.

After leaving school at the age of 15, Woodward wanted to train as a journalist, but took work in a sanitary engineer's office, and then at the age of 16 he entered the Royal Academy of Dramatic Art (RADA) as its youngest ever student.

== Career ==
=== Theatre ===
Woodward's professional acting debut was in the Castle Theatre, Farnham, in 1946. He started worked extensively in repertory companies as a Shakespearean actor, making his London stage debut in R. F. Delderfield's Where There's a Will in 1955 and also appeared in the film adaptation that same year, his first film, and then Romeo and Juliet and Hamlet (1955). Having established himself, he also worked in Broadway theatre in New York City and in Australia. Woodward first appeared on Broadway in Rattle of a Simple Man (1963) and the musical comedy High Spirits (1964–1965), which won three Tony Awards, followed by the 1966 comedy The Best Laid Plans. In 1970, after Woodward played Sidney Carton in the West End musical Two Cities, based on Dickens's novel A Tale of Two Cities, Laurence Olivier invited him to choose his own role in the Royal National Theatre, and he chose Cyrano de Bergerac (1971).

Woodward played Dr. Watson opposite Keith Baxter as Sherlock Holmes in the play Murder Dear Watson in 1983.

In 2004, Woodward, alongside Australian actor Daniel MacPherson, appeared as God in a revival of The Mystery Plays at Canterbury Cathedral. From a cast of hundreds of local actors, Joseph McManners and Thomas James Longley also featured with smaller speaking roles.

=== Film ===
Woodward made occasional film appearances before taking the lead role of Sergeant Neil Howie in the folk horror film The Wicker Man (1973). Robin Hardy, who directed the film, said, "He was one of the greatest actors of his generation, without a doubt, with a broad career on American television, as well as on British film." He was offered a cameo role in the remake, The Wicker Man (2006), but declined. He also appeared as Commander Powell in the 1982 film Who Dares Wins.

Woodward played the title role in the 1980 Australian biographical film drama Breaker Morant, and had a supporting role in the 2007 action comedy Hot Fuzz. His last lead film role was that of the story of an eccentric vicar Reverend Frederick Densham in A Congregation of Ghosts.

In 1990, Woodward was the narrator for the official FIFA film of the 1990 World Cup entitled Soccer Shoot-Out.

Noël Coward once said Woodward was "one of the nicest and most co-operative actors I've ever met or worked with."

=== Television ===
Woodward appeared in many television productions. In the early 1960s, he was a jobbing actor who made a number of minor TV appearances in supporting roles. His casting as Guy Crouchback, the central character in Waugh's three novels set against the background of Britain's involvement in World War II, in the 1967 adaption of Evelyn Waugh's Sword of Honour trilogy, dramatised by Giles Cooper and directed by Donald McWhinnie established him. That black-and-white TV dramatisation was remade in 2001 in a colour version with Daniel Craig playing the part of Crouchback. The 1967 Sword featured several leading actors of that era, including Ronald Fraser, Freddie Jones, Vivian Pickles, Nicholas Courtney, and James Villiers. Evelyn Waugh had met and approved Giles Cooper as the scriptwriter, having their schooling at Lancing College in common, albeit more than a decade apart.

In 1967, Woodward played the eventual victim in the episode "The Persistent Patriots" of The Saint TV series. The same year, he was cast as David Callan in the ITV Armchair Theatre play A Magnum for Schneider, which later became the spy series Callan, one of his early television roles. His performance assured the series' success from 1967 to 1972, with a film appearing in 1974. He appeared opposite Laurence Olivier in a 1978 adaptation of Saturday, Sunday, Monday in the Laurence Olivier Presents anthology TV series.

Callan made Woodward one of the most popular actors in Britain. The show typecast him somewhat, but the enduring success of the genre allowed him to gain leading roles in similar productions, though none would prove to be as iconic as Callan. Michael C. Burgess of Cinemalogue said, "of his more than 2,000 television performances, his portrayal of the ex-SIS undercover man Callan created an icon, if not a genre." In 1977, he starred in two series of the BBC2 dystopian drama 1990, about a future Britain lurching into totalitarianism.

In the mid 1980s, Woodward took the lead role in the American television series The Equalizer (1985–1989) as a former intelligence operative. After filming a few episodes of the third season, Woodward suffered a massive coronary. For several episodes, additional actors were brought in to reduce the workload on Woodward as he recovered from the condition. The first episode, filmed following Woodward's heart attack, involved his character being severely injured by a KGB bullet, providing Woodward with a chance to rest over several episodes. Later in the season, Woodward resumed his full duties and carried the show through a fourth season during 1988–1989. During this period, he also starred in the Cold War espionage thriller, Codename: Kyril (1988), as an MI6 double agent.

Subsequently, he starred in the short-lived CBS series Over My Dead Body, which ran in 1990, playing a mystery writer who gets involved in solving real crimes. In 1994 and 1997, Woodward starred in the BBC drama Common As Muck, in which he played a binman called Nev.

In 1993, Woodward appeared in the Welsh language drama, Tan ar y Comin. Versions were made in both English and Welsh, and Woodward appeared in both, being specially coached in the latter, since he did not speak a word of the language.

In 1999, Woodward appeared alongside his son Peter in "The Long Road", an episode of the Babylon 5 spin-off, Crusade, on which Peter was a regular cast member. Both actors were playing the part of unrelated Technomages.

His career continued with TV guest-star roles, including an appearance in The New Alfred Hitchcock Presents and Mr. Jones (or Philip, codename Flavius) in the series La Femme Nikita. He also guest-starred with his son Tim and grandson Sam as a London gangster family in a special storyline for The Bill in 2008. In March 2009, he joined EastEnders for six episodes, playing Tommy Clifford.

Woodward was a wargamer and hosted a six episode television series, called Battleground, for Tyne Tees Television in 1978 about the hobby, with fellow enthusiast Peter Gilder, who built and owned the beautiful Gettysburg diorama used for one of the gaming scenes for the 1974 film Callan.

Woodward was the subject of This Is Your Life on two occasions; in February 1971, he was surprised by Eamonn Andrews in the bar of London's White House Hotel, and in February 1995, Michael Aspel surprised him during a photoshoot at Syon House in West London.

=== Music ===
Woodward's capability as tenor enabled him to record 12 albums of romantic songs, and three albums of poetry and 14 books to tape. His vocal ability and acting skill enabled him to make a number of appearances when time allowed on the BBC's Edwardian era music hall programme, The Good Old Days.

Woodward had two top-100 albums in the UK Albums Chart; This Man Alone (number 53 in 1970) and The Edward Woodward Album (number 20 in 1972), while the single "The Way You Look Tonight" peaked at number 42 on the UK singles chart in 1971. He also had two top-100 albums in Australia; Edwardian Woodward (number 97 in 1975) and A Romantic Hour (#92 in 1980).

Selected discography

- This Man Alone (1970)
- It Had to Be You (1971)
- The Edward Woodward Album (1972)
- An evening with.... Edward Woodward (1974)
- Woodward Again (1974)
- Edwardian Woodward (1975)
- Love Is the Key (1977)
- The Thought of You (1978)
- Don't Get Around Much Anymore (1979)
- A Romantic Hour--20 Golden Favourites (1980)

== Personal life ==
Woodward was married twice. His first marriage was to actress Venetia Barrett (born Venetia Mary Collett, 1928–2016) from 1952 to 1986. They had two sons: Tim Woodward (1953–2023) and Peter Woodward (born 1956), both of whom became actors, as well as a daughter, Tony Award-nominated actress Sarah Woodward (born 1963). Woodward left Barrett for actress Michele Dotrice, the daughter of his contemporary Roy Dotrice, and married her in New York City in January 1987. Their daughter, Emily Beth Woodward (born 1983), was present at the ceremony.

In 1974, Woodward was present during the Turkish invasion of Cyprus. Staying in the northern town of Kyrenia, he was one of several Britons evacuated from the island by the Royal Navy aircraft carrier HMS Hermes.

Woodward was a prominent endorser of the Labour Party in the 1970 general election, featuring in publicity material. He later declared his support for the Social Democratic Party (SDP).

Woodward suffered a massive heart attack in 1987 (during the third season of The Equalizer) and another one in 1994. He underwent triple-bypass surgery in 1996 and quit smoking. In 2003, he was diagnosed with prostate cancer. In July 2009, a planned performance of Love Letters (1988), co-starring his wife Michele, was to be postponed because of damage caused to his hip when he fell down the stairs at his West Country home.

== Death ==
Woodward died of pneumonia at the Royal Cornwall Hospital in Truro, Cornwall, on 16 November 2009, at the age of 79, near his home at Hawker's Cove.

== Awards ==
Woodward won the 1970 BAFTA Award for Best Actor for his title role in Callan. He was made an Officer of the Order of the British Empire (OBE) in 1978. At the 1987 Golden Globe Awards, he won Best Actor in a Dramatic TV Series for his role of Robert McCall in The Equalizer. At the Emmy Awards from 1986 to 1990, he was nominated each year for The Equalizer.

- Golden Globe Award for Best Actor – Television Series Drama – 1987
- British Academy Television Award for Best Actor – 1970
- RTS Television Actor of the Year – 1969, 1970
- Primetime Emmy Award for Outstanding Lead Actor in a Drama Series (nominated) – 1986, 1987, 1988, 1989, 1990
- Primetime Emmy Award for Outstanding Guest Actor in a Drama Series (nominated) – 1989
- Officer of the Most Excellent Order of the British Empire – 1978

== Stage work ==
- 1955: Where There's a Will
- 1958: Romeo and Juliet
- 1958: Hamlet
- 1962: Rattle of a Simple Man
- 1964: High Spirits
- 1969: Two Cities
- 1969: Julius Caesar
- 1969: The White Devil
- 1970: Cyrano de Bergerac
- 1973: The Wolf
- 1975: Male of the Species
- 1976: On Approval
- 1978: The Dark Horse
- 1980: The Beggar's Opera (also as director)
- 1980: Private Lives
- 1982: The Assassin
- 1982: Richard III
- 1992: The Dead Secret

== Filmography ==
=== Film ===
Year	Title	Role	Director	Notes
1955	Where There's a Will	Ralph Stokes	Vernon Sewell	
1960	Inn for Trouble		C.M. Pennington-Richards	Uncredited
1964	Becket	Clement	Peter Glenville	Uncredited
1969	The File of the Golden Goose	Arthur Thompson	Sam Wanamaker	
1971	Incense for the Damned	Dr. Holstrom	Michael Burrowes	
1972	Sitting Target	Inspector Milton	Douglas Hickox	
1972	Young Winston	Aylmer Haldane	Richard Attenborough	
1972	Hunted	John Drummond	Peter Crane	Short
1973	The Wicker Man	Sergeant Neil Howie	Robin Hardy	
1974	Callan	David Callan	Don Sharp	
1975	Three for All	Roadsweeper	Martin Campbell	
1977	Stand Up, Virgin Soldiers	Sgt. Wellbeloved	Norman Cohen	
1980	Breaker Morant	Lt. Harry "Breaker" Morant	Bruce Beresford	Singing over the end credits
1981	The Appointment	Ian	Lindsey Vickers	
1982	Who Dares Wins	Commander Powell	Ian Sharp	
1984	Champions	Josh Gifford	John Irvin	
1985	King David	Saul	Bruce Beresford	
1990	Mister Johnson	Sargy Gollup	Bruce Beresford	
1990	Soccer Shootout: 1990 World Cup	Narrator	Mario Morra	
1992	Aladdin	The Sultan	Timothy Forder	Voice
1993	Tân ar y Comin		David Hemmings	
1994	Deadly Advice	Maj. Herbert Armstrong	Mandie Fletcher	
1997	The House of Angelo	Dominic Angelo	Jim Goddard	Also producer
2000	Marcie's Dowry	Gus Wise	David Mackenzie	Short
2002	The Abduction Club	Lord Fermoy	Stefan Schwartz	
2007	Hot Fuzz	Tom Weaver	Edgar Wright	
2009	A Congregation of Ghosts	Reverend Frederick Densham	Mark Collicott	

=== Television ===
Year	Title	Role	Notes
1956	A Girl Called Jo	John Brooke	Television film
1957	The Telescope	John Mayfield	Television film
1959	Armchair Theatre		3.25 "The Fabulous Money Maker"
1959	World Theatre	Titinius	1.01 "Julius Caesar"
1959	ITV Television Playhouse	Joe Murdoch	4.52 "One a Penny, Two a Penny"
1959	Skyport		6 episodes
1960	Inside Story	Stanislaw Krasinski	1.01 "A Touch of Brimstone"
1960	The True Mistery of the Passion	Peter	Television film
1960	Armchair Mystery Theatre	Paul Danek	1.03 "The Case of Paul Danek"
1961	Emergency Ward 10	Rev. Posset	1.144 "Episode #1.444"
1961	Adventure Story	Peter	1.01 "The Reef"
1961	Magnolia Street	John Cooper	6 episodes
1961	BBC Sunday-Night Play	Superintendent Morland	3.01 "A Clean Kill"
1961	You Can't Win	Paul Hayward	1.01 "Greater Than Fear"
1962	Sir Francis Drake	Spanish Captain	1.23 "Court Intrigue"
1962	ITV Play of the Week	Adolphus Cusins	8.08 "Major Barbara"
1964	Sergeant Cork	Austen Carew	1.16 "The Case of the Ormsby Diamonds"
1964	ITV Play of the Week	The Boy's Father	9.26 "I Can Walk Where I Like Can't I?"
1964	The Defenders	H.T. Harris	4.05 "Conflict of Interests"
1965	Mogul	Ron Smith	1.03 "Safety Man"
1965	Armchair Mystery Theatre	Anstey	3.11 "Wake a Stranger"
1966	Thirty-Minute Theatre	Arthur	1.33 "Ella"
1966	Dixon of Dock Green	Bruce Paynter	13.12 "The Accident"
1967	Theatre 625	Guy Crouchback	4.09 "Sword of Honour"
1967	Armchair Theatre	David Callan	7.02 "A Magnum for Schneider"
1967	Thirty-Minute Theatre	Alan	2.25 "Wanted"
1967	The Revenue Men	Bill Murray	1.02 "Don't Get Conspicuous"
1967	The Baron	Arkin Morley	1.29 "Countdown"
1967	The Saint	Jack Liskard	1.15 "The Persistent Patriots"
1967	Conflict	Othello	2.16 "Othello"
1967	Trapped	Mark Frazier	2.01 "Trapped: Au Pair Swedish Style"
1967–1972	Callan	David Callan	43 episodes
1968	Mystery and Imagination	Reeve	3.02 "The Listener"
1968	ITV Playhouse	Ed; Lt.-Col. Fox-Lennard	1.42 "Entertaining Mr. Sloane"; 2 "Premiere: The Night of Talavera"
1968	Detective	Auguste Dupin	2.17 "The Murders in the Rue Morgue"
1968	Sherlock Holmes	Mason	2.13 "Shoscombe Old Place"
1969	BBC Play of the Month	Cassius	4.08 "Julius Caesar"
1969	The Bruce Forsyth Show		
1969	Omnibus	F. Scott Fitzgerald	3.09 "F. Scott Fitzgerald: The Dream Divided"
1969	Detective	Commissaire Bignon	3.09 "The Poisoners"
1969	The Root of All Evil?	Designi	2.02 "A Bit of a Holiday"
1971	Play for Today	Frank	2.3 "Evelyn"
1971	BBC Play of the Month	Lopakhin	7.04 "The Cherry Orchard"
1971	The Edward Woodward Hour	Host	
1973	Whodunnit?	Himself (host)	6 episodes
1975	Armchair Cinema	Philip Warne	1.04 "When Day Is Done"
1977	ITV Playhouse	George Mangham	9.08 "The Bass Player and the Blonde"
1977–1978	1990	Jim Kyle	16 episodes
1978	Saturday, Sunday, Monday	Luigi	Television film
1978	The Bass Player and the Blonde	Mangham	3 episodes
1980	ITV Playhouse	Ian	12.07 "A Rod of Iron"
1980	Nice Work	Edwin Thornfield	6 episodes
1981	Sunday Night Thriller	Alex Logan	1.04 "Blunt Instrument"
1981	Chronicle	Narrator (voice)	1.07 "The Crime of Captain Colthurst"
1981	Wet Job	David Callan	Television film
1981	Winston Churchill: The Wilderness Years	Sir Samuel Hoare	Television miniseries
1983	The Spice of Life	Narrator (voice)	13 episodes
1983	Love Is Forever	Derek McBracken	Television film
1984	Killer Contract	Bill Routledge	Television film
1984	A Christmas Carol	Ghost of Christmas Present	Television film
1985	Merlin and the Sword	Merlin	Television film
1985–1989	The Equalizer	Robert McCall	88 episodes
1987	Uncle Tom's Cabin	Simon Legree	Television film
1988	Codename: Kyril	Michael Royston	Television miniseries
1988	Memories of Manon	Robert McCall	Television film
1988	Alfred Hitchcock Presents	Drummond	3.20 "The Hunted"
1989	The Man in the Brown Suit	Sir Eustace Pedler	Television film
1990	Hands of a Murderer	Sherlock Holmes	Television film
1990–1991	Over My Dead Body	Maxwell Beckett	11 episodes
1991–1992	America at Risk	Host	Television documentary
1991–1996	In Suspicious Circumstances	Storyteller	39 episodes
1994	A Christmas Reunion	Colonel Phillips	
1994–1997	Common As Muck	Nev	12 episodes
1995	The Shamrock Conspiracy	Edward Harrison	Television film
1996	Gulliver's Travels	Drunlo	Television miniseries
1996	Harrison: Cry of the City	Edward "Teddy" Harrison	Television film
1999	Crusade	Alwyn	1.02 "The Long Road"
1999	CI5: The New Professionals	Harry Malone	13 episodes
2001	La Femme Nikita	Mr. Jones	4 episodes
2001	The Lone Gunmen	Peanuts' Speech Synthesizer	1.07 "Planet of the Frohikes"
2001	Dark Realm	Captain Kelly	1.11 "Emma's Boy"
2001	Messiah	Rev. Stephen Hedges	Television miniseries
2002	Night Flight	Vic Green	Television film
2004	Murder in Suburbia	Reg	1.06 "Noisy Neighbours"
2005	Where the Heart Is	Jack Bishop	9.09 "So Long"
2007	Five Days	Victor Marsham	Television miniseries
2007	First Landing	Older Nathaniel Peacock / Narrator (voice)	Television film
2008	The Bill	Johnnie Jackson	24.27 "Sins of the Father"
2009	EastEnders	Tommy Clifford	6 episodes
