= Dotrice =

Dotrice is a surname. Notable people with the surname include:

- Roy Dotrice, OBE (1923–2017), English actor
- Kay Dotrice (1929–2007), British actress, wife of Roy
- Michele Dotrice (born 1948), English actress, daughter of Roy and Kay
- Karen Dotrice (born 1955), English actress, daughter of Roy and Kay
