= List of The Men from the Ministry episodes =

This is an episode list of the British Radio comedy The Men from the Ministry.

== Series overview ==
Series	Episodes	Originally released			Timeslot
Series	Episodes	First released	Last released	Network	Timeslot
1	13	30 October 1962	22 January 1963	Light Programme	Tuesday 8:00 pm
S	1	24 December 1964		Home Service	Thursday 7:30 pm
2	13	25 July 1965	17 October 1965	Light Programme	Tuesday 8:00 pm
3	14	11 December 1966	12 March 1967	Light Programme	Sunday 9:30 pm
4	13	12 February 1968	12 May 1968	Radio 2	Sunday 2:31 pm
5	6	15 February 1969	22 March 1969	World Service; Radio 4	Saturday 7:30 pm (World Service); Tuesday 7:00 pm (Radio 4)
6	14	1 February 1970	29 September 1970	World Service; Radio 4	Sunday (World Service); Tuesday 7:30 pm(Radio 4)
7	9	29 July 1971	23 September 1971	Radio 4	Thursday 12:25 pm
S	1	29 November 1971		Radio 4	Monday 6:15 pm
8	8	11 July 1972	29 August 1972	Radio 4	Tuesday 12:25 pm
9	13	6 March 1973	29 May 1973	Radio 4	Tuesday 12:25 pm
10	13	17 June 1974	9 September 1974	Radio 4	Monday 6:15 pm
11	13	26 May 1975	18 August 1975	Radio 4	Monday 6:15 pm
12	8	6 June 1976	24 August 1976	Radio 4	Monday 6:15 pm
13	13	4 July 1977	22 August 1977	Radio 4	Monday 6:30 pm
14	14	1980	1980	World Service	TBC

== Episodes ==
=== Series 1 (1962–63) ===
with Wilfrid Hyde-White as "One" and Roy Dotrice as "Sir Gregory Pitkin" in this and second Series

No. overall	No. in series	Title	Original release date
1	1	"The Great Footwear Scandal"	30 October 1962
2	2	"The Big Rocket"	6 November 1962
3	3	"Strictly for the Birds"	13 November 1962
4	4	"French Cricket"	20 November 1962
5	5	"The War with the Isle of Wight"	27 November 1962
6	6	"Moderately Important Person"	4 December 1962
7	7	"The Rhubarb Pirates"	11 December 1962
8	8	"A Matter of Form"	18 December 1962
9	9	"The Magic Carpet"	25 December 1962
Episode missing
10	10	"The Spy in Black and White"	1 January 1963
11	11	"Island in the Sun"	8 January 1963
12	12	"Problem in the Park"	15 January 1963
Episode missing
13	13	"The End of the Road"	22 January 1963
Episode missing

=== Christmas special (1964) ===
No. overall	No. in series	Title	Original release date
14	1	"A Present for Norman"	24 December 1964
Episode missing

=== Series 2 (1965) ===
No. overall	No. in series	Title	Original release date
15	1	"Pirates of Lakeview Reservoir"	25 July 1965
Episode end missing
16	2	"Something about a Soldier"	1 August 1965
17	3	"The Trouble with Cecil"	8 August 1965
Episode end missing
18	4	"Mahboni Lies Over the Ocean"	15 August 1965
Episode end missing
19	5	"The Man Who made it Rain"	22 August 1965
Episode end missing
20	6	"Train of Events"	29 August 1965
21	7	"Degrading Business"	5 September 1965
22	8	"The Butcher of Glensporran"	12 September 1965
Episode end missing
23	9	"Counter Spies"	19 September 1965
Episode end missing
24	10	"A Question of Dundancy"	26 September 1965
25	11	"A Back-dated Problem"	3 October 1965
26	12	"The Hole"	10 October 1965
27	13	"The Day the Martians Came"	17 October 1965
Episode end missing

=== Series 3 (1966–67) ===
with Deryck Guyler as "One" and Ronald Baddiley as "Sir Gregory Pitkin" in this and all subsequent Series

No. overall	No. in series	Title	Original release date
28	1	"Rebel in Regents Park"	11 December 1966
Episode missing
29	2	"A Terrifying Weapon"	18 December 1966
Episode end missing
30	3	"The Post Office Pantomime"	25 December 1966
Featuring Clive Dunn
31	4	"All at Sea"	1 January 1967
32	5	"Bowler Hats and Machine Guns"	8 January 1967
33	6	"On the Run"	15 January 1967
34	7	"A Gift for Sir Gregory"	22 January 1967
Episode end missing
35	8	"A Whitehall Circus"	29 January 1967
Episode beginning and end missing
36	9	"Customs of the Country"	5 February 1967
37	10	"Getting the Bird"	12 February 1967
Episode beginning and end missing
38	11	"The Girl in the Case"	19 February 1967
39	12	"The Thing on the Beach"	26 February 1967
40	13	"A Slight Case of Demolition"	5 March 1967
41	14	"The Fastest Ship in the World"	12 March 1967
Episode end missing

=== Series 4 (1968) ===
No. overall	No. in series	Title	Original release date
42	1	"Battle of the River Thames"	18 February 1968
43	2	"The Tubby Submarine"	25 February 1968
44	3	"A Matter of Breeding"	3 March 1968
45	4	"The Great Showbiz Fiasco"	10 March 1968
46	5	"Up the Poll"	17 March 1968
47	6	"Waterway to Go"	24 March 1968
48	7	"Dam Nuisance"	31 March 1968
Episode missing
49	8	"The Fastest Brolly in the West"	7 April 1968
50	9	"Lamb takes a Gambol"	14 April 1968
51	10	"Four Men in a Wellington"	21 April 1968
Featuring Kenneth Horne and Sam Costa
52	11	"Out of this World"	29 April 1968
53	12	"Muddlers in Law"	5 May 1968
54	13	"What Has Four Wheels and Flies?"	12 May 1968
Episode end missing

=== Series 5 (1969) ===
Episodes were first aired in a different order on the World Service, which had commissioned the series.

No. overall	No. in series	Title	Radio 4 air date	World Service air date
55	1	"A Rotten System"	25 March 1969	15 February 1969
Featuring Joan Sanderson
56	2	"A Brush With an Old Master"	1 April 1969	8 March 1969
Episode end missing
57	3	"All Play and No Work"	8 April 1969	15 March 1969
Episode end missing
58	4	"A Sticky Business"	15 April 1969	22 March 1969
59	5	"The Home-Brewed Non-Vintage Bomb"	22 April 1969	22 February 1969
Episode missing
60	6	"The Ship That Wagged Its Tail"	29 April 1969	1 March 1969

=== Series 6 (1970) ===
Some episodes were first aired on the World Service.

No. overall	No. in series	Title	Radio 4 air date	World Service air date
61	1	"Bye-Bye Mildred"	30 June 1970	8 March 1970
62	2	"Bare Necessities"	7 July 1970	15 March 1970
Featuring Joan Sanderson
63	3	"Storm in a Tea Urn"	14 July 1970	22 March 1970
Featuring Patricia Hayes
64	4	"The Moving Target"	21 July 1970	29 March 1970
65	5	"Oil Well that ends Well"	28 July 1970	1 February 1970
66	6	"The Bigger the Better"	4 August 1970	22 February 1970
Featuring Clive Dunn
67	7	"Trouble in the Air"	11 August 1970	1 March 1970
68	8	"Miss Chatterley's Lover"	18 August 1970	8 February 1970
Featuring John Laurie
69	9	"The Pudding From Outer Space"	25 August 1970	15 February 1970
Episode missing
70	10	"A Little of what you Fancy"	1 September 1970	n/a
71	11	"A Bird in the Hand"	8 September 1970	n/a
72	12	"Bringing the House Down"	15 September 1970	n/a
73	13	"Fair Exchange"	22 September 1970	n/a
74	14	"Bill Stickers is Innocent"	29 September 1970	n/a

=== Series 7 (1971) ===
No. overall	No. in series	Title	Original release date
75	1	"Rolling In It"	29 July 1971
76	2	"Lost In Space" "Up, Up and Away"	5 August 1971
Episode missing
77	3	"Thoroughly Modern Ministry"	12 August 1971
78	4	"We All Make Mistakes"	19 August 1971
79	5	"The Fool-Proof Fool"	26 August 1971
80	6	"Rotten To the Corps"	2 September 1971
Episode beginning missing
81	7	"Transatlantic Trouble"	9 September 1971
82	8	"The Finger of Suspicion"	16 September 1971
83	9	"Just the Ticket"	23 September 1971

=== Special (1971) ===
No. overall	No. in series	Title	Original release date
84	1	"Gone to Pot"	29 November 1971
Episode end missing

=== Series 8 (1972) ===
No. overall	No. in series	Title	Original release date
85	1	"The Conference Trick"	11 July 1972
86	2	"The Night We Crept Into The Crypt"	18 July 1972
87	3	"How Now Brown Cow?"	25 July 1972
88	4	"Sorry, Wrong Number"	1 August 1972
Episode end missing
89	5	"The Desk Job"	8 August 1972
90	6	"Fowl Play"	15 August 1972
91	7	"Something of Value"	22 August 1972
92	8	"Taking Leave of their Census"	29 August 1972

=== Series 9 (1973) ===
No. overall	No. in series	Title	Original release date
93	1	"That's my Pigeon"	6 March 1973
94	2	"Don't Let them Needle You"	13 March 1973
Featuring Joan Sanderson
95	3	"Find the Lady"	20 March 1973
96	4	"Bridge Under Troubled Waters"	27 March 1973
97	5	"A Private Affair"	3 April 1973
Featuring Clive Dunn
98	6	"Food For Thought"	10 April 1973
99	7	"Getting it Taped"	17 April 1973
100	8	"Safe and Unsound"	24 April 1973
101	9	"The Export Caper"	1 May 1973
102	10	"Flushed with Success"	8 May 1973
103	11	"Under The Weather"	15 May 1973
104	12	"Monkey Business"	22 May 1973
105	13	"Cheesed Off"	29 May 1973

=== Series 10 (1974) ===
No. overall	No. in series	Title	Original release date
106	1	"Plane Madness"	17 June 1974
107	2	"Vipers in the Bosom"	24 June 1974
108	3	"Great Guns"	1 July 1974
Episode end missing
109	4	"I Want my Mummy"	8 July 1974
110	5	"One Man's Meat"	15 July 1974
111	6	"Ballet Nuisance"	22 July 1974
Episode end missing
112	7	"Sky High"	29 July 1974
113	8	"A Break for Sir Gregory"	5 August 1974
Episode end missing
114	9	"Health and Deficiency"	12 August 1974
115	10	"Big Deal"	19 August 1974
116	11	"They Fry by Night"	26 August 1974
117	12	"In the Picture"	2 September 1974
118	13	"She'll Have to Go"	9 September 1974

=== Series 11 (1975) ===
No. overall	No. in series	Title	Original release date
119	1	"Nothing but the Vest"	26 May 1975
120	2	"That's My Baby"	2 June 1975
121	3	"All that Glitters"	9 June 1975
122	4	"Torn to Shreds"	16 June 1975
123	5	"Wool Over Their Eyes"	23 June 1975
124	6	"This, VAT and the Other"	30 June 1975
125	7	"The Great Trouser Troubles"	7 July 1975
126	8	"The Cabinet Crisis"	14 July 1975
127	9	"Chain Reaction"	21 July 1975
128	10	"All Change"	28 July 1975
129	11	"A Merry Dance"	4 August 1975
130	12	"A Sense of Power"	11 August 1975
131	13	"Postal Disorder"	18 August 1975

=== Series 12 (1976) ===
No. overall	No. in series	Title	Original release date
132	1	"All Cisterns Go"	6 July 1976
133	2	"A Problem Shared"	13 July 1976
134	3	"The Whitehall Castaways"	20 July 1976
135	4	"Off the Rails"	27 July 1976
136	5	"Penny Wise"	3 August 1976
137	6	"A Turn For the Nurse"	10 August 1976
138	7	"Seal of Office"	17 August 1976
139	8	"Birmingham is Revolting"	24 August 1976

=== Series 13 (1977) ===
No. overall	No. in series	Title	Original release date
140	1	"Mission Inedible"	4 July 1977
141	2	"Horse Play"	11 July 1977
142	3	"The Big Big Big Ben Bungle"	18 July 1977
143	4	"A Motley Crew"	25 July 1977
144	5	"Not on Your Telly"	1 August 1977
145	6	"One Way Only"	8 August 1977
146	7	"Take Your Pick"	15 August 1977
147	8	"Claws"	22 August 1977

=== Series 14 (1980) ===
This series was originally recorded for distribution overseas by BBC Transcription Services and was not broadcast in the UK at the time.

No. overall	No. in series	Title	Re-recording of Episode	Recording date
148	1	"Boots"	"The Great Footwear Scandal"	13 April 1980
149	2	"Pardon My French"	"French Cricket"	13 April 1980
150	3	"Traffic Diversions"	"The End of the Road"	15 April 1980
151	4	"Watch This Space"	"The Big Rocket"	20 April 1980
152	5	"Birds of a Feather"	"Strictly for the Birds"	20 April 1980
153	6	"Where There's a Will"	"Problem in the Park"	22 April 1980
154	7	"The Country Caper"	"The Rhubarb Pirates"	22 April 1980
155	8	"Ban The Wotsit"	"A Terrifying Weapon"	27 April 1980
156	9	"A Testing Time"	"A Degrading Business"	27 April 1980
157	10	"Pushing the Vote Out"	"Up The Poll"	29 April 1980
158	11	"Gone To Earth"	"The Hole"	29 April 1980
159	12	"Computaclanger"	"The Trouble With Cecil"	6 May 1980
160	13	"A Great Convenience"	"A Slight Case Of Demolition"	6 May 1980
161	14	"The Christmas Spirit"	"The Magic Carpet"	15 April 1980
