= Matthew Garber =

British actor (1956–1977)

- Born: Matthew Adam Garber; 25 March 1956; Stepney, London, England
- Died: 13 June 1977 (aged 21); Hampstead, London, England
- Resting place: East Finchley Cemetery and Crematorium, London, England
- Education: St Paul's School, Winchmore Hill; Highgate School
- Occupation: Actor
- Years active: 1963–1967

Matthew Adam Garber (25 March 1956 – 13 June 1977) was a British child actor, most notable as Michael Banks in the 1964 film Mary Poppins. His other screen credits include The Three Lives of Thomasina (1963) and The Gnome-Mobile (1967), appearing alongside actress Karen Dotrice in all three films they made for Walt Disney Pictures.

== Early life ==
Matthew Adam Garber was born on 25 March 1956 in Stepney, London, to parents who had performed on stage. Garber attended St Paul's Primary School in Winchmore Hill and Highgate School in Highgate, North London, from September 1968 until July 1972. He had a younger brother, Fergus Garber, who was born in 1964, the year Matthew played Michael Banks. His father's name was recorded by the school he had attended as Louis Leonard Garber. Matthew was considered a spirited and bright boy in a 1967 Disney press release that noted his enjoyment of pulling practical jokes on his friends, playing sports, and reading adventure, mythology and poetry books.

== Career ==
A friend of the Garber family, Karen Dotrice's father, Shakespearean actor Roy Dotrice, called Garber to the attention of Disney Casting, where his use of "artful dodges, like squinting, screwing up his nose, and brushing his hair back with one hand" led to his screen debut at age seven in Disney's The Three Lives of Thomasina (1963). That same year, both Garber and Thomasina co-star Dotrice were hired to play Jane and Michael, the children of Mr. George Banks (David Tomlinson) and Mrs. Winifred Banks (Glynis Johns), who get more than they bargained for when they hire a nanny named Mary Poppins (Julie Andrews). Disney's live-action animated film adaptation of the Mary Poppins book series by P. L. Travers won five Academy Awards and made its stars world-famous.

Garber and Dotrice teamed up one final time in 1967 in The Gnome-Mobile, as the grandchildren of a rich lumber mogul (Walter Brennan) who stumble across a gnome forest and are asked to help keep the gnomes from dying off.

Dotrice recalled, "He was how he looked—an imp, and I loved being his shadow. I can't imagine making movies would have been half as much fun without him. He loved being naughty, finding and jumping off of small buildings on the back lot. While I was Victorian proper and wouldn't let myself get dirty or muddy, Matthew had a great sense of fun and danger. He was a daredevil and could have been a race car driver. And he did live a full life over his 21 years."

== Illness and death ==
In 1976, Garber contracted hepatitis while on an overland trek in India. By the time he reached medical help, the disease had spread to his pancreas. Although his father brought him back to London, Garber died on 13 June 1977 at age 21 in the Royal Free Hospital in Hampstead, London, of haemorrhagic necrotising pancreatitis. His body was cremated at St. Marylebone Crematorium (East Finchley, London) three days later.

== Legacy ==
Garber was posthumously named a Disney Legend in 2004, with his brother Fergus accepting the award on his behalf. On the Mary Poppins 40th anniversary DVD, Karen Dotrice said she regretted not having kept in touch with Garber.

== Filmography ==
Year	Title	Role	Notes
1963	The Three Lives of Thomasina	Geordie McNab	First film role
1964	Mary Poppins	Michael Banks	
1967	The Gnome-Mobile	Rodney Winthrop	Final film role
