= Know Your Place (radio series) =

- Genre: comedy
- Running time: 30 mins
- Country of origin: United Kingdom
- Language: English
- Home station: BBC Radio 2
- Created by: Andrew Palmer and Nell Brennan
- Produced by: Edward Taylor
- Original release: 28 January 1982 – 2 August 1983
- No. of series: 2
- No. of episodes: 15

Know Your Place is a short-lived BBC Radio 2 sitcom from the early 1980s, set in Worthing Court, a rundown Edwardian block of flats in Bloomsbury, London. The storyline centred around a series of conflicts - and the longstanding frisson - between the elderly caretaker 'the remarkable' Ramsay Potts (played by Roy Dotrice) and his assertive cleaner Elspeth Spurgeon (Patricia Hayes). They are further frustrated by management demands and occasional brushes with tenants. The title refers to the UK's enduring class system, with the associated deference of the cleaner to the caretaker and in turn, the caretaker to the management. Actors who appeared in more than one episode included Pat Coombs, Jon Blythe, Jon Glover, John Graham, Norma Ronald and James Taylor.

Storylines bear some similarities with the long-running The Men from the Ministry and the later Radio 2 series Mind Your Own Business. All three were produced by Edward Taylor.

The sitcom ran for two series in 1982–3. Both series were written by Andrew Palmer and Nell Brennan. Eight episodes have since been repeated on Radio 4 Extra.

== Programmes ==
=== Series 1, 28 January – 11 March 1982 ===
First broadcast	Title	Guest star
28 January 1982	Lift off*	Frank Thornton
4 February 1982	Not To Be Used For Babies*	
11 February 1982	The Siege of Worthing Court	
18 February 1982	Room to Manoeuvre*	
25 February 1982	The New Broom	
4 March 1982	Sick Benefit	
11 March 1982	Marriage of Convenience*	

=== Series 2, 16 June – 2 August 1983 ===
First broadcast	Title	Guest star
16 June 1983	Jumpers*	
23 June 1983	Sauce for the Goose	
30 June 1983	Interim Dividend	
7 July 1983	Sisterly Feelings*	Avis Bunnage
14 July 1983	If You Look Up Mine Can I Look Up Yours	
21 July 1983	Health Can Damage Your Smoking*	
28 July 1983	The Finger of Suspicion	Kenneth Connor
2 August 1983	Out of the Closet*	Bernard Bresslaw

Programmes marked * have been repeated on Radio 4 Extra.
