= Captain Jack (film) =

1999 British comedy film

Captain Jack is a 1999 British comedy film produced by John Goldschmidt and written by Jack Rosenthal. The cast includes Bob Hoskins, Sadie Frost, Gemma Jones, Anna Massey, Peter McDonald, Maureen Lipman and Michele Dotrice. The film was produced by Goldschmidt's own company Viva Films Ltd. and was distributed on video by Koch Vision.

== Plot ==
Captain Jack stars Bob Hoskins as a rebellious captain of a small Whitby boat who is determined to flout petty maritime bureaucracy. Officials declare his boat unsafe for a planned voyage to the Arctic, but Jack is determined to set sail and to place a plaque there in commemoration of his seafaring hero. With his motley crew, Captain Jack succeeds in making his voyage despite an international search for his boat by maritime authorities.

== Inspiration ==
The film is based on a true life incident involving a Whitby man, Jack Lammiman, who declared that his ship was seaworthy but was being hampered from sailing by maritime rules. As in the film, he slipped out of the harbour unseen in 1991. His crew included a vicar, a lady pensioner and a 62-year-old Royal Navy veteran named Hugh Taff Roberts. Lammiman sailed his ship, Helga Maria, to the Arctic and fulfilled his wish to place a memorial plaque on Jan Mayen Island to honour Whitby whaling Captain, William Scoresby (see, William Scoresby his son). During the voyage he evaded an international search by the naval authorities using a number of techniques which included painting his boat a different colour. Lammiman arrived back at his home port of Whitby to a hero's welcome, a court appearance, a fine and eventually (after non-payment of his fine) four days in jail.
