= The Three Lives of Thomasina =

1964 film by Don Chaffey

- Official theatrical poster
- Directed by: Don Chaffey
- Written by: Robert Westerby
- Based on: Thomasina, the Cat Who Thought She Was God by Paul Gallico
- Produced by: Ron Miller Walt Disney
- Starring: Patrick McGoohan; Susan Hampshire; Karen Dotrice; Matthew Garber
- Narrated by: Elspeth March
- Cinematography: Paul Beeson
- Edited by: Gordon Stone
- Music by: Paul J. Smith
- Production company: Walt Disney Productions
- Distributed by: Buena Vista Distribution
- Release dates: 11 December 1963 (New York City); 4 June 1964 (U.S.)
- Running time: 97 minutes
- Countries: United Kingdom; United States
- Languages: English; Gaelic
- Box office: $2,250,000 (US/ Canada)

The Three Lives of Thomasina is a 1963 fantasy film directed by Don Chaffey about a cat's influence on a family. Patrick McGoohan and Susan Hampshire star alongside child actors Karen Dotrice and Matthew Garber. Based on Paul Gallico's 1957 novel Thomasina, the Cat Who Thought She Was God, the film was shot in Inveraray, Argyll, Scotland, and Pinewood Studios, England, with a screenplay by Gallico and Robert Westerby.

== Plot ==
In 1912 Inveranoch, Scotland, veterinarian Andrew MacDhui lives with his seven-year-old daughter Mary and her cat Thomasina, who narrates the film in voiceover. MacDhui is a widower whose wife's death destroyed his belief in God and his empathy for others. When Thomasina contracts tetanus after a scuffle near the fish market goes wrong, MacDhui orders his assistant Willie Bannock to put her down. Willie reminds MacDhui that he promised Mary to make Thomasina well again, but he is so preoccupied with his surgery on another patient's guide dog that he ignores the plea. Traumatised by Thomasina's death, Mary withdraws emotionally from MacDhui and declares her father dead, refusing to speak to or look at him.

Thomasina's soul goes to a feline afterlife and meets the Egyptian cat goddess Bastet. Since Thomasina still has eight lives left, Bastet returns her to her body.

Mary and her friends take Thomasina's body beyond the town for a funeral, but they are frightened by the appearance of "Mad Lori" MacGregor, a young woman who lives in the glen and was attracted by the children's singing and bagpipe playing. The children believe she is a witch because of her apparent power to calm and cure animals. Lori brings Thomasina back to her makeshift animal hospital. Although the cat recovers, she has no memory of her life with Mary. Thus begins her second life.

The townspeople are disappointed by MacDhui's lack of compassion, so they begin taking their sick pets to Lori instead. MacDhui visits Lori with the intention of confronting her for stealing his business, but instead they both realize that they each have half of what is needed to treat sick animals: he has the science and surgical knowledge; she has the love and compassion. By working together, they are able to save a badger whose right rear leg has been injured by a trap.

As Thomasina's memory is slowly returning, she realizes she misses something very important, but she cannot recall what. She remembers the way back home, but does not recognize Mary, who chases her into a rainstorm. Thomasina returns to the safety of Lori's shack in the woods. Mary contracts pneumonia, and her father finds her lying on the street in the rain.

A Romani group sets up camp in town and opens their travelling circus. When MacDhui and Lori discover the Romani have been abusing their performing animals (for instance, a dancing Asiatic black bear), they visit the circus. Their attempt at discussion leads to a fight and, eventually, a fire. The police arrest the proprietors for animal cruelty.

MacDhui prays for the first time in four years that God will somehow cure his daughter. Off in the glen, a lightning bolt strikes a tree next to Thomasina, and her memory is suddenly restored. Thomasina returns to the MacDhui home. MacDhui places her in his daughter's arms, and this restores Mary's will to live — as well as her love for her father. Lori's love has changed MacDhui. They make a perfect veterinary team, and they soon marry. Thomasina begins her third life with all of them together.

== Cast ==
- Patrick McGoohan – Andrew MacDhui
- Susan Hampshire – Lori MacGregor
- Karen Dotrice – Mary MacDhui
- Matthew Garber – Geordie McNab
- Laurence Naismith – Reverend Angus Peddie
- Jean Anderson – Mrs. MacKenzie
- Wilfrid Brambell – Willie Bannock
- Finlay Currie – Grandpa Stirling
- Ruth Dunning – Mother Stirling
- Vincent Winter – Hughie Stirling
- Denis Gilmore – Jamie McNab
- Ewan Roberts – Constable McQuarrie
- Oliver Johnston – Mr. Dobbie
- Francis de Wolff – Targu
- Charles Carson – Doctor
- Nora Nicholson – Old Lady
- Jack Stewart – Birnie
- Thomasina – Herself— several cats
- Elspeth March – the voice of Thomasina

== Reception ==
In a pre-release review, Howard Thompson of The New York Times (2 June 1964) found the film "a nice one, but... far from top-drawer Disney." He thought it was a "sentimental and extremely genteel little movie... best suited for small girls," but praised the major performers (including the cat) and the settings. He concluded by describing the film as "mighty, mighty cosy."

Film critic Leonard Maltin (in his book The Disney Films) on the other hand, refers to this film very highly; calling it "delicate and charming", and very deserving of a larger audience if ever reissued. One scene in particular that he highly praised, was Thomasina's trip to Cat Heaven, calling it: "a wondrous piece of movie magic". In another article written by Maltin, he includes this film title among the lesser known gems of Disney movies, (along with other films like Darby O'Gill and the Little People). Maltin also said Dotrice "won over everyone" with her performance in Thomasina, and she (and fellow cast member Matthew Garber) were signed to play the Banks children in the Disney film Mary Poppins.

== References in other works ==
- In Grant Morrison's comic book series The Invisibles, Mason Lang claims that the film "explains 'Everything'". He is later given a statue of the goddess Bast by Lady Edith Manning.

== See also ==
- List of American films of 1963
