= Thomasina, the Cat Who Thought She Was God =

1957 novel by Paul Gallico

- Front cover of a Penguin Books paperback edition
- Author: Paul Gallico
- Genre: Children's fantasy novel
- Publisher: Doubleday
- Publication date: 1957
- Publication place: United States
- Media type: Print (hardcover)
- ISBN: 0385048041

Thomasina, the Cat Who Thought She Was God or Thomasina is a 1957 novel by Paul Gallico about a cat, owned by a child whose strict father must learn that love is powerful enough to help others. The book was adapted for the 1963 Disney film The Three Lives of Thomasina.

== Plot ==
Andrew MacDhui, a widowed veterinary surgeon working in fictional Inveranoch, Scotland, in 1912 has a young daughter, Mary Ruadh, who is attached to her pet ginger cat Thomasina (who narrates some of the story). Although Mary loves Thomasina, her father MacDhui only tolerates the cat. MacDhui is a bitter and resentful atheist because his wife died young, and while he had desired to be a medical doctor to save humans, his overbearing father forced him to be a vet like himself. The village children talk of a local "witch" named Lori, who is said to cure ailing animals through magic. After MacDhui refuses to help an injured frog found by Geordie McNab, the boy takes the frog to Lori and leaves it for her to heal.

One day Thomasina falls ill, so Mary takes her beloved cat to her father, expecting him to cure Thomasina. To Mary's shock, MacDhui has his assistant chloroform Thomasina and tells Mary that she's been euthanized. Mary recovers Thomasina's body, and her friend Hughie Stirling suggests giving her the best funeral the village children can arrange. Mary obliges, and the children write on Thomasina's headboard that she was "foulley murdered". Mary refuses to talk to her father again until he brings Thomasina back and spurns his offer of a new pet. She later confides to her father's friend, the Reverend Peddie, with whom MacDhui spars over God's existence, that her father is dead and that she killed him. As time passes, Mary stops talking altogether and loses interest in life.

When the funeral is over, and Mary and her friends leave Thomasina's burial place in the hills, Lori appears, exhumes Thomasina's body, and discovers that the cat is still alive; the chloroform simply induced a deep sleep. Lori takes the cat to her own cottage to recover. When Thomasina wakes up, she thinks that she is Bastet, the Egyptian cat goddess, resurrected. The other animals at Lori's cottage don't believe her, especially when she tries to show her powers to them. Thomasina does not remember Mary or her former life. Lori renames her "Talitha" and keeps her.

Meanwhile, Mary has become ill and is eventually confined to bed, unable to speak. As a result of MacDhui's treatment of Thomasina, many villagers have stopped taking their animals to him and instead are taking them to Lori. MacDhui goes to confront Lori over this and ends up helping her care for a badly injured badger that is beyond her ability to heal. He is touched by her tenderness and learns that she also has experienced the loss of her close family. He visits her often, teaching her medical skills. They eventually join forces to rescue starving and abused animals owned by Romani people ("gypsies") camping outside of town, who are displaying the animals. This leads to a fight between Dr. MacDhui and Lori against the gypsies.

Upon hearing that Mary will die soon, MacDhui goes to fetch Lori, believing that only she can help Mary, but overwhelmed by his vehemence, she doesn't respond. Coming upon Thomasina's grave on his way home, he sees the inscription on the gravestone, revealing his true nature to him, and he calls on God for forgiveness, then returns to Mary. Lori comes at Reverend Peddie's request, and Thomasina, who has been sleeping in a drawer scented with lavender at Lori's cottage, wakes up and suddenly remembers her true identity and her past life with Mary and is impelled to make her way back to Mary through a rainstorm. When Thomasina appears at Mary's window, Lori recognizes her as the cat she rescued, the housekeeper lets her in, and MacDhui hands her back to Mary. Mary is overjoyed to have her cat again and immediately starts to recover. MacDhui marries Lori and becomes a kinder veterinarian who now likes Thomasina.

== Characters ==
- Thomasina/Bast-Ra – the main character; a ginger cat who is owned by Mary Ruadh and provides comfort to the motherless girl
- Mary Ruadh – a seven-year-old motherless girl who owns and is devoted to Thomasina
- Andrew MacDhui – Mary Ruadh's father, a veterinary surgeon
- Lori – a healer (rumored to be a witch) who lives outside the village in an isolated cottage and cares for sick and injured animals
- Reverend Angus Peddie – insightful Presbyterian minister and MacDhui's close friend since university
- Hughie Stirling – a friend of Mary Ruadh and organizes Thomasina's funeral
- Geordie Mcnabb – a six-year-old boy who seeks Lori's help with his injured frog
- Dr. Strathsay – a doctor who diagnoses Mary when she becomes ill

== Adaptation ==
In 1963 The Three Lives of Thomasina, a film based on Thomasina, was released by Disney Studios.
