= The Men from the Ministry =

British radio comedy series (1962–1977)

- Genre: Sitcom
- Running time: 30 minutes
- Country of origin: United Kingdom
- Language: English
- Home station: BBC Light Programme; BBC Home Service; BBC Radio 2; BBC World Service; BBC Radio 4
- Starring: Wilfrid Hyde-White (1962–65); Deryck Guyler (1966–80); Richard Murdoch; Norma Ronald; Roy Dotrice (1962–65); Ronald Baddiley (1966-80); Diana Olsson (1962–65)
- Original release: 30 October 1962 – 1980
- No. of episodes: 161 (including specials) (list of episodes)

The Men from the Ministry is a British radio comedy series broadcast by the BBC between 1962 and 1977, starring Wilfrid Hyde-White, Richard Murdoch and, from 1966, when he replaced Hyde-White, Deryck Guyler. Written and produced by Edward Taylor with contributions from John Graham, and with some early episodes written by Johnnie Mortimer and Brian Cooke, it ran for 13 series, totalling 145 half-hour episodes and two specials. A further 14 episodes were made by the BBC Transcription Service in 1980 but never broadcast in the UK, until 2012 on BBC Radio 4 Extra. Versions were made by Yle in Finland, Sveriges Radio (SR) in Sweden, and Springbok Radio in South Africa, where it was made into a feature-length film.

== Format ==
The series is about lazy, bungling, incompetent civil servants, "Number One" – Roland Hamilton-Jones (Wilfrid Hyde-White) and later Deryck Lennox-Brown (Deryck Guyler), "Number Two" – Richard Lamb (Richard Murdoch), with their dim, typo-prone, teenage secretary, Mildred Murfin (Norma Ronald), all watched-over by the lecherous, pompous, self-seeking Permanent Under-Secretary Sir Gregory Pitkin (Roy Dotrice and later Ronald Baddiley), all members of the British Civil Service based in Whitehall. The stories centred on their General Assistance Department (analogous to the "Department of Administrative Affairs" in the later Yes Minister), which helps other governmental departments. Instead of assistance, the department creates mix-ups, misunderstandings and cock-ups that lead to a telling-off from Sir Gregory, who sees his 'hard earned' Civil Service career and pension disappearing.

The characters are portrayed as inept, subject to greed, selfishness and incompetence. However, malice was never a factor and all the humour was light-hearted. There was also a little broad satire in many episodes. Later series tended to recycle older scripts, just people and places being changed.

== Cast ==
- "One" (Roland Hamilton-Jones) – Wilfrid Hyde-White (1962–1965)
- "One" (Deryck Lennox-Brown) – Deryck Guyler (1966–1977)
- "Two" (Richard Lamb) – Richard Murdoch
- Mildred Murfin – Norma Ronald
- Under-Secretary Sir Gregory Pitkin, CBE – Roy Dotrice (1962–1965), Ronald Baddiley (1966–1977)
- April Adams – Secretary to Roland Hamilton-Jones – Diana Olsson (1962–1965)

In addition, script contributor John Graham played various characters throughout the series.

Other occasionally recurring characters include Lord Stilton (played by Graham), Sir Gregory's equally pompous boss; Mr. 'Whizzer' Wilkins, Lennox-Brown and Lamb's aged and absent-minded colleague; and Mr. Stack – "Mr. Stack of 'Records' – in charge of the Ministry's Records department and prone to taking naps in the "S" section of his filing cabinets. In the 1970 episode, "Bye-bye Mildred", Sir Gregory does not appear and we hear instead Sir Hector Gunn. Also appearing in some episodes are Mr. "Creepy" Crawley, a rather ingratiating member of the Department, and Miss Lusty, an elderly lady in the Pensions Department who lives up to her name. One of Sir Gregory's later paramours was "Daphne Bentwater" from the typing pool. The Ministry building's hall porter was the ancient and lazy "Mr Matthews" – "Old Matthews". Other named but non-appearing characters include "Mrs Bratby", Lamb's landlady, and the legendary Rudge of the Board of Trade, whose accomplishments include inventing the Rudge Defence in chess.

The antics of Lennox-Brown and Lamb would sometimes be reported in newsclips within the programme by "Forth Robinson", a parody of the then well-known Scottish reporter, Fyfe Robertson. John Graham also portrayed Forth Robinson in at least one radio episode of Whack-O!.

Other 'news' items would be read out by the real BBC newsreaders Jon Curle and Bryan Martin. In the 1977 episode, "Not on Your Telly", Sir Gregory is interviewed for the BBC Panorama programme by Robin Gay, a thinly-disguised parody of the broadcaster Robin Day. In "Under the Weather" a news item by Alan Snicker - a broadcaster modelled on Alan Whicker - is featured.

Actors who appeared in episodes of the series include Clive Dunn, Pat Coombs, Warren Mitchell, Bill Pertwee, Joan Sanderson and Nicolette McKenzie. Richard Murdoch's co-star from Much-Binding-in-the-Marsh, Kenneth Horne also appeared in one episode.

In three episodes John Laurie, playing Mr. Dougal, stood in for Deryck Guyler who was temporarily unable to take part.

== Theme music ==
The theme music for the BBC version was Top Dog, composed by Ivor Slaney (1921–1988) in 1960 and recorded by the Hilversum Radio Orchestra conducted by Hugo De Groot (DW 2681) for De Wolfe Music.

== Other versions ==
=== Yleisradio version ===
The Men from the Ministry has become a major success in Finland by the name of Knalli ja sateenvarjo ('A bowler hat and an umbrella'). It has been in the repertoire of Yleisradio (YLE) since 1979 and has been repeated twice. Scriptwriter Edward Taylor has also written some episodes only for the Finnish audience. These episodes have never been broadcast in the UK, the last four having been aired in 2008. There are altogether 170 episodes in the Finnish series. Cast includes Kauko Helovirta as Hamilton-Jones, Pekka Autiovuori as Lamm (Lamb), Aila Svedberg as Mildred Murfin and Yrjö Järvinen as Sir Henry (Gregory) Pitkin. After Helovirta's death in 1997 Hamilton-Jones was replaced with Roland Lennox-Brown by Heikki Nousiainen. Yrjö Järvinen chose to retire from his role as Sir Henry in 2001 and was replaced with Sir Clive Swift by Antti Pääkkönen.

=== Sveriges Radio version ===
The Men from the Ministry was also produced in Sweden by Sveriges Radio (SR) as I plommonstop och paraply ('With a bowler hat and an umbrella') from 1963 to 1971. The role of Hamilton-Jones was played by Gunnar Björnstrand, who is noted for his acting in many films by Ingmar Bergman (A Lesson in Love, Smiles of a Summer Night, The Seventh Seal, The Magician, Through a Glass Darkly, Winter Light, etc.). He was joined by famous Swedish actor and comedian Stig Järrel, who is noted for his role as the sadistic teacher Caligula in the film Torment (1944), directed by Alf Sjöberg after a screenplay by Ingmar Bergman. Both actors enjoyed a widespread popularity in Sweden and the radio series was popular. About 40 shows were made in Sweden.

=== Danmarks Radio version ===
The Men from the Ministry was also produced in Denmark by Danmarks Radio (DR) as Ministeriernes tænkeboks in 1978. The main characters was played by Per Pallesen (Deryck Lennox-Brown), Jess Ingerslev (Richard Lamb), Jesper Langberg (Sir Gregory), Kirsten Walther (Myrna) and Helge Kjærulff-Schmidt (Lord Stilton). In minor roles: Benny Hansen, Henning Palner, John Martinus, Benny Bundgaard, Ulrik Neumann, Gotha Andersen and Karen Lykkehus. Just 4 shows were made in Denmark.

=== Springbok Radio/Radio South Africa version ===
A South African adaptation of the series was also produced in Durban by the South African Broadcasting Corporation (SABC), featuring similar main characters (Roland Lennox-Brown and Richard Lamb) but using local actors. Additional characters also made regular appearances including South Asian immigrant Rampersad Haribhai Spoonilal V Muckerjee and elderly working class couple Humbert and Lolita Snethersthwaite. Produced by father/son team Tom Meehan and Brian Squires for Springbok Radio between 1968 and 1985, and Radio South Africa from 1993 to 1995, the series eventually ran to about 900 episodes. After the demise of Springbok Radio in 1985, 71 episodes were subsequently re-recorded and broadcast on the SABC's Radio South Africa, this time produced by Don Ridgway.
