= Michele Dotrice =

British actress

- Born: Cleethorpes, Lincolnshire, England
- Occupation: Actress
- Years active: 1960–present
- Spouse: Edward Woodward (m. 1987; died 2009)
- Children: 1
- Parents: Roy Dotrice (father); Kay Newman (mother)
- Relatives: Karen Dotrice (sister)

Michele Dotrice is an English actress. She played Betty Spencer, the long-suffering wife of Frank Spencer, portrayed by Michael Crawford, in the BBC sitcom Some Mothers Do 'Ave 'Em, which ran from 1973 to 1978, and returned in 2016 for a special.

== Career ==
Her first significant role was in the 1962 13-part BBC TV adaptation of The Old Curiosity Shop in which she played Nell, and she appeared in The Witches for Hammer Films in 1966. In 1970, she had starring roles in the horror thrillers And Soon the Darkness and The Blood on Satan's Claw. Her other film appearances include Jane Eyre (1970) with George C. Scott and the 1976 comedy Not Now, Comrade.

It was her appearance in Some Mothers Do 'Ave 'Em that made her a household name, and she played the role for five years from 1973. In 2016, she reprised the role in a one-off special broadcast as part of the Sport Relief charity fundraiser event.

Her other 1970s roles include Felicity in the Jason King episode "Buried in the Cold Cold Ground", and Lady Percy in the BBC productions of Henry IV, Part 1 and Part 2 in 1979.

In 1981, she took the leading role in the short-lived sitcom Chintz, which aired on ITV. In 1986, Dotrice played the role of a new mother whose child was snatched in an episode of The Equalizer along with her future husband Edward Woodward. In the mid-1990s, she appeared for several episodes in the period drama Bramwell. She appeared in the film Captain Jack (1999) with Bob Hoskins. She has made numerous guest appearances in well-known British television series, including Midsomer Murders (1 episode, 1998), Holby City (1 episode, 2002), Murder in Suburbia (as Cindy in series 2, episode 6, 2005), and the BBC daytime soap opera Doctors (2 episodes, 2008 & 2009). In addition, she made a couple of appearances in a 2004 BBC comedy-drama entitled A Thing Called Love, set in Nottingham, which starred Paul Nicholls and Roy Barraclough among others.

In 2012, she toured in The Ladykillers, playing the role of Mrs. Wilberforce. In 2014, she played Pam Chandler, a suspected murderer, in the last episode of series three of Death in Paradise. In 2015, she played Marion, mother to Christine in the Inside No. 9 episode "The 12 Days of Christine". In 2016, she played Nancy, the faithful dresser and woman of all work to the main character, in the West End production of Nell Gwynn. In 2017, she played Jessie in the stage musical The Girls at the Phoenix Theatre in the West End.

In 2018, she returned to television playing Edna Friendship in A Very English Scandal.

ITV launched their new drama, McDonald & Dodds, in 2020, in which she played Mary Costair in the second episode of series 1. In 2025 she appeared in the Costume Drama The Hardacres.

== Personal life ==
Her parents were the actors Roy Dotrice and Kay Dotrice. She has two sisters, including Karen Dotrice.

Dotrice was married to actor Edward Woodward from January 1987 until his death in November 2009.

== Filmography ==
=== Film ===
Year	Title	Role	Notes
1966	The Witches	Valerie Creek	
1970	And Soon the Darkness	Cathy	
1970	Jane Eyre	Mary Rivers	
1971	The Blood on Satan's Claw	Margaret	
1976	Not Now, Comrade	Nancy Rimmington	
1999	Captain Jack	Deirdre	
2015	The Importance of Being Earnest LIVE	Miss Prism	
2016	Starfish	Jean	
2016	The Lock-in	Posh Woman	Short film
2020	Blithe Spirit	Edna	

=== Television ===
Year	Title	Role	Notes
1961	The Treasure Seekers	Princess	Episode 3: "Held to Ransom"
1961	Operation Fantail	Susan Forest	Television films
1961	Vice Versa	Dulcie Grimstone	Television films
1961	Adventure to Order	Sandra	Television films
1961–1962	Signpost	Schoolgirl	8 episodes
1962	BBC Sunday-Night Play	Barbara Cahoun	Series 3; episode 19: "The Happiest Days of Your Life"
1962	BBC Sunday-Night Play	Daff	Series 3; episode 31: "To Whom It May Concern"
1962	The Father	Bertha	Television film
1962	Katy	Clover Carr	All 8 episodes
1962–1963	The Old Curiosity Shop	Nell Trent	All 13 episodes
1965	Love Story	Jill Allen	Series 3; episode 19: "The Sad Smile of the Mona Lisa"
1966	Thirteen Against Fate	Sonia	Episode 13: "The Consul"
1966	Out of the Unknown	R.747	Series 2; episode 4: "Level Seven"
1966	Theatre 625	Vera Alexandrovna	Series 3; episode 24: "A Month in the Country"
1966	Theatre 625	Thérèse	Series 4; episode 7: "Amerika"
1966	ITV Play of the Week	Julie	Series 12; episode 17: "Julie's Gone"
1967	ITV Play of the Week	Tess Cosgrove	Series 12; episode 18: "On the Island"
1967	Sir Arthur Conan Doyle	Vicky Heald/Crabbe	6 episodes
1967	Les Misérables	Fantine	Episodes 2–4
1968	Late Night Horror	Phrynne Banstead	Episode 5: "The Bells of Hell"
1968	Middlemarch	Dorothea	Mini-series; all 7 episodes
1968	The Wednesday Play	Emma	Series 8; episode 13: "On the Eve of Publication"
1969	ITV Sunday Night Theatre	Jane	Series 1; episode 18: "Toys"
1970	BBC Play of the Month	Irina	Series 5; episode 4: "The Three Sisters"
1970	The Wednesday Play	Emma	Series 9; episode 24: "Emma's Time"
1971	Jason King	Felicity	Episode 3: "Buried in the Cold Cold Ground"
1971	The Rivals of Sherlock Holmes	Mary Hisgins	Series 1; episode 5: "The Horse of the Invisible"
1972	The Sextet	Ange	Episode 1: "The Gregorian Chant"
1972	The Sextet	Vickie	Episode 2: "Night Duty"
1972	The Sextet	Maggie Firebrace	Episode 3: "A Question of Degree"
1972	The Sextet	Veronica Sands	Episode 4: "Follow the Yellow Brick Road"
1972	The Sextet	Barbara	Episode 5: "Stoker Leishman's Diaries"
1972	The Sextet	Marion	Episode 6: "Stanley's Style "
1972	The Sextet	Paula Lelliot	Episode 7: "Disappearing Trick"
1972	The Sextet	Claire Ramsdale	Episode 8: "Blur and Blank via Cleckheaton"
1973	Menace	Sharon	Series 2; episode 8: "Comfortable Words"
1973–1978	Some Mothers Do 'Ave 'Em	Betty Spencer	Series 1–3; all 22 episodes
1974	Zodiac	Julie Prentiss	Episode 6: "The Horns of the Moon"
1974	ITV Playhouse	Frances	Series 7; episode 11: "A Kind of Bonus"
1976	The Morecambe and Wise Show	Herself / Constance	Series 9; episode 2
1977	I'm Bob, He's Dickie	Various	Episode 1
1977	BBC Play of the Month	Catherine Winslow	Series 12; episode 4: "The Winslow Boy"
1979	Morecambe and Wise at the BBC	Various	Episode: 7 February 1979
1979	BBC Television Shakespeare	Lady Percy	Henry IV, Part I and Henry IV, Part II. Television films
1981	Chintz	Kate Carter	All 7 episodes
1986	The Equalizer	Vanessa Daniels	Episode: "Heartstrings" (S2.E11)
1988	Boon	Nikki	Series 3; episode 8: "Peacemaker"
1995	Bramwell	Lady Cora Peters	Series 1; episodes 1–4 & 6
1997	Q.E.D.	Anna Peters	Episode: "Cause of Death"
1998	Midsomer Murders	Felicity Buckley	Series 1; episode 4: "Faithful unto Death"
1998	Vanity Fair	Mrs. Sedley	Episodes 1–5
2000	The Mrs Bradley Mysteries	Amy Parkin	Episode 3: "Laurels Are Poison"
2001	The Way We Live Now	Mrs. Pipkin	Mini-series; episodes 1, 3 & 4
2002	Holby City	Shirley Butler	Series 5; episode 10: "Leopard Spots"
2004	A Thing Called Love	Barbara Hopewell	Episodes 4 & 6: "Hooked on a Feeling" and "Love Hurts"
2005	Murder in Suburbia	Cindy	Series 2; episode 6: "Golden Oldies"
2008	Doctors	Eileen Mullins	Series 10; episode 11: "A Pain in the..."
2009	Doctors	Jane Shields	Series 11; episode 98: "Hello, Hello, Hello"
2010	Agatha Christie's Marple	Mrs. Hubbard	Series 5; episode 4: "The Mirror Crack'd from Side to Side"
2014	Death in Paradise	Pam Chandler	Series 3; episode 8: "Rue Morgue"
2014	Big School	Rita Gunn	Series 2; episode 6
2015	Inside No. 9	Marion	Series 2; episode 2: "The 12 Days of Christine"
2016	Some Mothers Do 'Ave 'Em: Special	Betty Spencer	Sport Relief Special
2018	Grandpa's Great Escape	Miss Trifle	Television film
2018	A Very English Scandal	Edna Friendship	Mini-series; episodes 2 & 3
2019	A Very British Christmas	Sandra	Television film. (aka A Very Yorkshire Christmas)
2020	McDonald & Dodds	Mary Costair	Series 1; episode 2: "A Wilderness of Mirrors"
2021	The Cockfields	Lyn	Series 2; 4 episodes
2022	The Royal Mob	Queen Victoria	Episodes 1–3
2024	Inside No. 9	Party Guest	Series 9; episode 6: "Plodding On"
2025	Unforgotten	Dot Barnes	Series 6; episodes 1–4 & 6
2026	The Hardacres	Lady Imelda Hansen	
