= Kay Dotrice =

British actress (1929–2007)

- Born: Katherine Florence Newman; 9 May 1929; Liverpool, England
- Died: 2 August 2007 (aged 78); Hollywood, California, U.S.
- Occupation: Actress
- Spouse: Roy Dotrice (m. 1947)
- Children: 3, including Michele and Karen

Katherine Florence Dotrice (née Newman; 9 May 1929 – 2 August 2007), known professionally as Kay Newman and Kay Dotrice, was a British stage and screen actress, best known for her roles in the UK TV series Crossroads, the movie Cheech & Chong's The Corsican Brothers, and many repertory performances during the 1950s.

== Career ==
Dotrice began her career performing in revue and repertory theatre, particularly in the north of England. She played many lead roles, and consistently received positive notices. Reviewing J. Hartley Manners' Peg O' My Heart, one critic wrote "the Chichester family .. members were vividly contrasted [with] ... Kay Newman, fresh from her success as Emmy in "They Walk Alone", as the resentful Ethel", while another said, "Kay Newman, as the slandered wife, gave an appealing performance". Reviews of Mel Dinelli's The Man commented "Kay Newman in particular gave an impressive performance. As the frightened and tormented woman who unwittingly hires the services of a homicidal maniac as a house-help, she had a firm grasp on the part", and "Kay Newman reveals strong dramatic powers as in rapid succession she conveys nervous tension ranging from surprise to panic." In John Van Druten's Behold We Live, she "gives a delightful character study as a down-to-earth London housekeeper." In performances on Guernsey of Johnny Belinda, "the leading part of Belinda [was] a personal triumph for Kay Newman, who played it with charm and restraint."
In 1962, her six-year-old daughter Karen Dotrice was offered a five-year contract by Walt Disney, and Kay Dotrice spent all her time with her, supporting her and helping her learn her scripts. In 1977, she returned to performing under the name Kay Dotrice, playing the roles of Mrs Darling and Michael in a Decca recording of Peter Pan. The following year, she was cast as Mrs Crisp in the long-running ITV series Crossroads, and appeared in twenty-five episodes. In 1984, she appeared as the midwife in the film Cheech & Chong's The Corsican Brothers.

=== Selected stage performances (as Kay Newman) ===
Year	Title	Author	Theatre	Role	Company
1952	They Walk Alone	Max Catto	Royal, Castleford	Emmy	Frank H. Fortescue Players
1952	Peg O' My Heart	J. Hartley Manners	Royal, Castleford	Ethel	Frank H. Fortescue Players
1952	Scandalmongers		Royal, Castleford	Slandered wife	Frank H. Fortescue Players
1953	Gathering Storm	Gordon Glennon	Hippodrome, Keighley	Good-time girl	Queen's Players
1953	Life Begins At Fifty	Armitage Owen	Hippodrome, Keighley		Queen's Players
1953	The Man	Mel Dinelli	Hippodrome, Keighley	Woman who hires homicidal maniac as home-help	Queen's Players
1953	Wuthering Heights		Hippodrome, Keighley	Catherine Earnshaw	Queen's Players
1953	Behold We Live	John Van Druten	Hippodrome, Keighley	London housekeeper	Queen's Players
1953	Beggar My Neighbour	Arnold Ridley	Hippodrome, Keighley		Queen's Players
1953	Desire in the Night		Hippodrome, Keighley	Mother	Queen's Players
1954	Johnny Belinda	Elmer Blaney Harris	The Little, Guernsey	Belinda	Charles Denville Players
1955	Charley's Aunt	Brandon Thomas	The Little, Guernsey		Guernsey Repertory Company
1957	Goldilocks and the Three Bears (pantomime)		The Little, Guernsey	Goldilocks	Guernsey Repertory Company

== Family ==
Dotrice was the wife of actor Roy Dotrice. They lived for many years in Shipston-on-Stour, Warwickshire. Their daughters, Karen, Michele and Yvette, have also been actresses.
