= Karen Dotrice =

English actress (born 1955)

- Born: 9 November 1955 (age 70); Guernsey, Channel Islands
- Occupation: Actress
- Years active: 1963–1984; 2005; 2017–2020
- Spouses: Alex Hyde-White (m. 1986; div. 1992) Edwin "Ned" Nalle (m. 1994)
- Children: 3
- Parents: Roy Dotrice (father); Kay Newman (mother)
- Relatives: Michele Dotrice (sister)

Karen Dotrice (/doʊˈtriːs/ doh-TREESS; born 9 November 1955) is a British actress. She is known primarily for her role as Jane Banks in Walt Disney's Mary Poppins (1964), the feature film adaptation of the Mary Poppins book series. Dotrice was born in Guernsey in the Channel Islands to two stage actors. Her career began on stage, and expanded into film and television, including starring roles as a young girl whose beloved cat magically reappears in Disney's The Three Lives of Thomasina (1963) and with Thomasina co-star Matthew Garber as one of two children pining for their parents' attentions in Poppins. Dotrice appeared in five television programmes between 1972 and 1978, when she made her only feature film as an adult. Dotrice's life as an actress concluded with a short run as Desdemona in the 1981 pre-Broadway production of Othello.

In 1984, Dotrice retired from show business to focus on motherhood—she has three children from two marriages—though she has provided commentary for various Disney projects and has resumed making public appearances, including a cameo in Mary Poppins Returns in 2018. Dotrice was named a Disney Legend in 2004.

== Early life ==
Born on 9 November 1955 into a theatrical family, Dotrice is the daughter of Kay (née Katharine Newman) and Roy Dotrice, two Shakespearean actors who met and married while performing in repertory productions in the United Kingdom. Roy was also born in the Channel Islands. Dotrice has two sisters, including Michele. Her godfather was actor Charles Laughton, who was married to Elsa Lanchester, who would also appear in Mary Poppins.

Roy was a Wireless Operator serving with 106 Squadron of the Royal Air Force, and along with his other six crew, was shot down and taken prisoner of war on the night of 2/3 May 1942.

Dotrice was a toddler when her father joined the Shakespeare Memorial Theatre (later the Royal Shakespeare Company) in 1957. At age four, Dotrice was ready to perform, making her debut in an RSC production of The Caucasian Chalk Circle by Bertolt Brecht. There, a Disney scout saw Dotrice and brought her to Burbank, California, to meet Walt Disney.

== Career ==
=== Film ===
At age eight, Dotrice was hired in 1963 to appear in The Three Lives of Thomasina as a girl whose relationship with her father is mended by the magical reappearance of her cat. Matthew Garber also appeared in the movie. While Dotrice was in California, her father stayed in England—where he was portraying King Lear—and Walt Disney personally took care of her family, often hosting them in his Palm Springs home. Dotrice took quickly to Disney as a father figure, calling him "Uncle Walt". She said that the admiration was mutual: "I think he really liked English kids. He was tickled pink by the accent and the etiquette. And when I was being very English and polite, he would look proudly at this little child who had such good manners."

Film historian Leonard Maltin said Dotrice "won over everyone" with her performance in The Three Lives of Thomasina, and Dotrice was signed to play Jane Banks (along with Matthew Garber as her brother, Michael Banks) in Mary Poppins (1964). Disney's part-live-action, part-animation musical adaptation of the Poppins children's books by P. L. Travers starred David Tomlinson as a workaholic father and Glynis Johns as a suffragette mother who are too busy to spend much time with their children. Instead, they hire a nanny (Julie Andrews) who takes Jane and Michael on magical adventures designed to teach them—and their parents—about the importance of family. Poppins was Disney's biggest commercial success at the time and won five Academy Awards, making its stars world-famous. Dotrice and Garber were praised for their natural screen presence; critic Bosley Crowther wrote, "the kids ... are just as they should be," while author Brian Sibley said, "these charming, delightful young people provided a wonderful centre for the film."

Dotrice and Garber paired up a third and final time in The Gnome-Mobile (1967) as the grandchildren of a rich lumber mogul who stumble across a gnome forest and help to stop the gnomes from dying off. Starring Walter Brennan in a dual role, The Gnome-Mobile failed to perform on a par with Poppins at the box office, and Dotrice did not make another film appearance as a child.

After The Gnome-Mobile, Dotrice and Garber no longer kept in contact with each other. In an interview for the '40th Anniversary Edition' DVD release of Mary Poppins, Dotrice recalled how she learned of Garber's 1977 death:

"I remember his mum, Margot, calling [...] to let us know that Matthew had died. That was so unexpected. [...] I wished I had picked up the phone over the years, I wished I had treated him more like a brother; but he's indelibly printed in all of our minds, he's eternal. An amazing little soul."

In another interview she recalled:

"[Matthew] was how he looked—an imp, and I loved being his shadow. I can't imagine making movies would have been half as much fun without him. He loved being naughty, finding and jumping off of small buildings on the back lot. While I was Victorian proper and wouldn't let myself get dirty or muddy, Matthew had a great sense of fun and danger. He was a daredevil and could have been a race car driver. And he did live a full life over his 21 years."

In 1977, she appeared with Ann-Margret in Joseph Andrews, a British film based on the Henry Fielding novel Joseph Andrews.

Dotrice appeared as Alex Mackenzie in The Thirty Nine Steps (1978) with Robert Powell and John Mills. The third film based on the John Buchan novel, this was her only feature film as an adult. In the film, Alex accompanies Hannay (Powell) while on the run from "both the spies and the police".

=== Television ===
In 1974, Dotrice appeared as Désirée Clary in the Thames Television serial Napoleon and Love. The nine-hour, dramatised account of Napoleon I of France starred Ian Holm and Tim Curry. That same year, she appeared alongside Helen Mirren and Clive Revill in Bellamira.

In 1975, Dotrice played housemaid Lily Hawkins in six episodes of Upstairs, Downstairs during its fifth and final season. The series, a narrative of the upper class Bellamy family and their servants in Edwardian and later England, was one of the most popular programmes produced by London Weekend Television for ITV. It also proved popular when shown in the United States on Masterpiece Theatre, and was "beloved throughout much of the world."

Dotrice took on the role of Maria Beadnell in two episodes of the serial Dickens of London (1976), starring her father as both Charles and John Dickens. In 1977, Dotrice appeared as Princess Ozyliza in the Jackanory episode "The Princess and the Hedgehog".

In 1978, Dotrice made her final screen appearance for some years as an actress, playing Dornford Yates' heroine Jenny in the BBC2 Play of the Week, She Fell Among Thieves, also starring Malcolm McDowell, Eileen Atkins and Michael Jayston. Thieves made its U.S. debut on 5 February 1980—the first film screened as part of the PBS Mystery! series.

=== Later career ===
In 1981, Dotrice took the role of Desdemona in the Warner Theatre production of Othello opposite James Earl Jones and Christopher Plummer. Reviewers were less than kind; calling her "the only serious let-down" in the cast, David Richards of The Washington Post wrote, "Dotrice is not Desdemona. She is a Desdemona doll, reciting her lines in a thin, reedy voice and moving through the tragedy with a rare somnolence." Dianne Wiest took the role in the 1982 Broadway production and received similar reviews.

Dotrice virtually disappeared from public life following her retirement. She was married to English actor Alex Hyde-White from 1986 to 1992. In 1994, Dotrice married then-Universal Studios executive Edwin Nalle.

Dotrice's voice work includes spoken-word adaptations of Disney's The Little Mermaid, Beauty and the Beast and Pocahontas; a sing-along release of Mary Poppins; an interview for the ABC television special Walt: The Man Behind the Myth; and narration for the audiobook adaptation of Dangerous Women by George R. R. Martin. She appeared as herself in the 2009 documentary The Boys: The Sherman Brothers' Story. However, as for acting, "I'll never go back," she told Hello! magazine in 1995, "because you don't have to put on any make-up."

Dotrice was coaxed back into the spotlight twice in 2004: she was named a Disney Legend at a ceremony in Burbank (at which Matthew Garber and Irwin Kostal, the movie's musical director, were honoured posthumously), and she was interviewed and provided audio commentary for the 40th Anniversary Edition Mary Poppins DVD release. Dotrice also provided audio commentary for the Acorn Media DVD release of Upstairs, Downstairs Series 5, discussing Episode 7 ("Disillusion"), the final episode in which she appears.

Despite having retired from acting, Dotrice's official website announced in 2014 that she will be making public appearances "for the first time in 50 years". The list includes memorabilia shows, signings, and corporate events.

=== Looking back ===
Almost a half-century after Poppins, and just in time for its 50th-anniversary Blu-ray re-release and the theatrical release of Saving Mr. Banks, Dotrice, who had since moved to Brentwood, California, told the Los Angeles Times that it was not until seeing Saving Mr. Banks that she truly understood why Walt Disney was the father figure she remembered. "I didn't know P. L. Travers' history" with Disney and his many years spent trying to convince Travers to let him tell the Poppins story on film. Dotrice noted a common thread; Travers was eight years old when her father died, and Walt Disney's father put him to work when he was eight. "I was eight when I did the film. I think P. L. Travers was trying to fix families [with the Poppins books, and Disney] wanted to heal people through his movies. Here I am 50 years later looking at this—I was crying when I was watching the film." In 2018, she appeared on a television special of Mary Poppins Returns: Behind the Magic – A Special Edition of 20/20 which aired on 22 November 2018 on ABC. She makes a cameo appearance in Mary Poppins Returns as an elegant lady who passes by the main characters on Cherry Tree Lane and asks for directions to #19. Talking about the cameo, Dotrice said, "Now that Mary Poppins is back it feels like she was here all along. She was in our hearts all along, that's for sure. I think her timing is immaculate, the world has never needed her more and so she's done it practically perfectly."

That experience stood in contrast to her memories of working on Poppins. "The joy that you see on the screen is the joy we felt." Dotrice recalled having a difficult time staying in character whenever Dick Van Dyke would do one of his "goofy dances". She also thought it odd that Julie Andrews was a smoker. "Everybody smoked back then. I have memories of Mary Poppins smoking a cigarette".

Still, in hindsight, Dotrice said she would never have done Poppins or any of her other films if she had it to do over again. Dotrice said children "should be learning and growing at their own pace" rather than "living in a Justin Bieber-esque-type world surrounded by a bunch of 'yes' people". Dotrice had seen so many of her peers struggling with "all sorts of demons" while growing up that she did not want her children becoming actors. Dotrice said that she gave up her own career when she was asked as a teenager to appear topless on screen.

== Filmography ==
Year	Title	Role	Notes
1963	The Three Lives of Thomasina	Mary MacDhui	
1964	Mary Poppins	Jane Banks	
1967	The Gnome-Mobile	Elizabeth Winthrop	
1977	Joseph Andrews	Pamela	
1978	The Thirty Nine Steps	Alex Mackenzie	
2009	The Boys: The Sherman Brothers' Story	Herself	Documentary film
2018	Mary Poppins Returns	Elegant Lady on Cherry Tree Lane	Cameo appearance

== Television ==
Year	Title	Role	Notes
1973	A Picture of Katherine Mansfield	Edna	1 episode
1974	Napoleon and Love	Désirée Clary	Episode: "Rose"
1974	Bellamira	Isabella	Television film
1975	Upstairs, Downstairs	Lily Hawkins	6 episodes
1976	Dickens of London	Maria Beadnell	2 episodes
1977	Jackanory	Princess Ozyliza	Episode: "The Princess and the Hedgehog"
1978	She Fell Among Thieves	Jenny	Television film
1982	Voyagers!	Marion Brownlow	Episode: "The Day the Rebs Took Lincoln"
2005	Young Blades	School Teacher	2 episodes
2020	Prop Culture	Herself	Episode: "Mary Poppins"

== Awards ==
Year	Organisation	Award	Work	Result
1979	Evening Standard British Film Awards	Best Newcomer – Actress	The Thirty Nine Steps	Won
