= Ronald Baddiley =

English actor (1922–1986)

- Born: 31 August 1922; Doncaster, England
- Died: 29 November 1986 (aged 64); Ruislip, London, England
- Occupation: Actor
- Known for: Sir Gregory Pitkin, CBE in The Men from the Ministry
- Spouse: Noreen Richards (m. 1950)

Ronald Baddiley (31 August 1922 – 29 November 1986) was an English actor. He was best known for his roles in the early days of the long-running British radio drama The Archers, and as Under-Secretary, Sir Gregory Pitkin, CBE in the BBC comedy The Men from the Ministry.

Baddiley was born on 31 August 1922, in Doncaster in Yorkshire, England, UK. In December 1950 he married Noreen Richards – she later performed alongside him in several episodes of radio serial The Archers.

== Career ==
Baddiley voiced the character of Percy Hood in BBC radio drama The Archers and first appeared on television in April 1956 playing the orchestra conductor in the TV short The Cobbler's Belle. In the same year he played Mr. Hepton in dramatist David Turner's Fresh as Paint and the policeman in One Fight More by David Campton and Stephen Joseph.

The following year he played PC Sanders in 4 episodes of The Other Man, and in 1958 Baddiley appeared in two BBC radio productions of Shakespeare, playing the parts of an outlaw and Panthino in the comedy The Two Gentlemen of Verona, and Abram in the tragedy Romeo and Juliet.

Baddiley performed alongside Arthur Lowe in the BBC Radio Third Programme production of Billy's Last Stand, the first play written by English author Barry Hines.

He featured in two BBC Radio 2 programmes on the same day in March 1968, appearing first in The Men from the Ministry and later alongside Clive Dunn, Deryck Guyler, Joan Sanderson, and Patricia Hayes in the Esmonde and Larbey comedy You're Only Old Once.

In 1970, Baddiley appeared as Freddie Daring in the satirical film The Rise and Rise of Michael Rimmer, and as himself in A Career in Shipbuilding (1975), directed by John Reeve and written by Ronald Dunkley.

Baddiley was railway inspector Mr Bun in the early 1970s series Parsley Sidings, which reunited him with Arthur Lowe, who played the stationmaster Horace Hepplewhite.

In January 1980, Baddiley was Bird One in Fit the Tenth of the second series of The Hitchhiker's Guide to the Galaxy. Later that year he played Cervantes in a two-part BBC radio adaptation of Don Quixote.

In 1981, Baddiley voiced the (uncredited) role of the British news reel commentator in five episodes of the TV series Private Schulz and the following year appeared as Lt Col Walter Anderson in the ITV Granada series Crown Court.

In 1983, Baddiley played Montague in the BBC Radio 3 production of Romeo and Juliet.

=== The Archers ===
Baddiley first appeared in The Archers on 12 December 1953 playing the part of the Squire; his final appearance on the programme was on 4 April 1966 in the role of Harvey Grenville. In between, he played other parts in the series, including that of Percy Hood in 1956.

== Death ==
Baddiley died suddenly on 29 November 1986; his funeral service and cremation were held five days later at Breakspear Crematorium, Ruislip, west London on Thursday 4 December.
