= Roy Dotrice =

British actor (1923–2017)

Roy Dotrice OBE
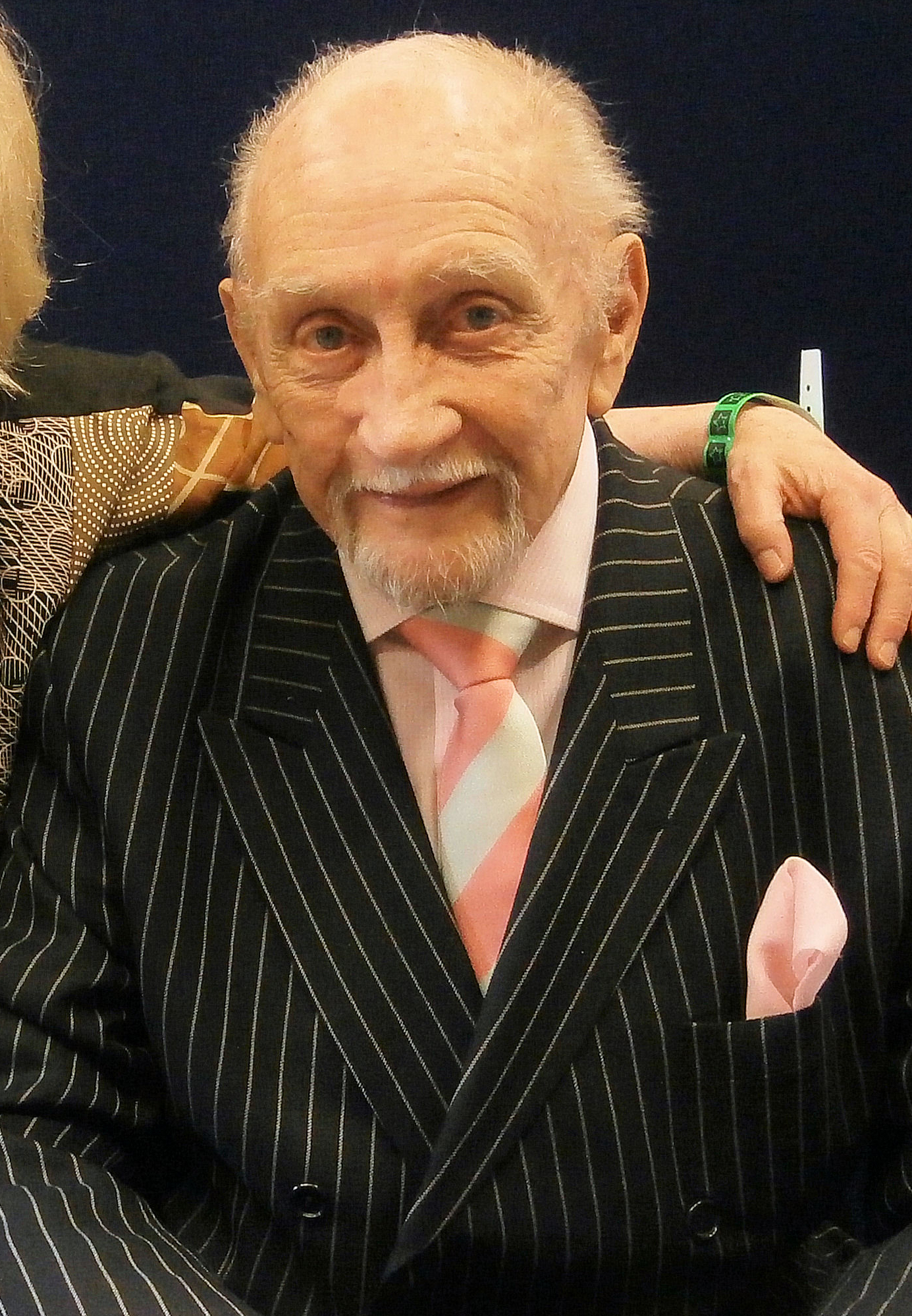
- Dotrice in 2014
- Born: 26 May 1923; Guernsey, Bailiwick of Guernsey
- Died: 16 October 2017 (aged 94); London, England
- Citizenship: British
- Occupation: Actor
- Years active: 1957–2012
- Known for: Brief Lives; A Moon for the Misbegotten
- Spouse: Kay Newman (m. 1947; died 2007)
- Children: 3; including Michele and Karen
- Awards: 1 Tony Award; 1 Drama Desk Award; 1 British Academy Television Award
- Website: roydotrice.com

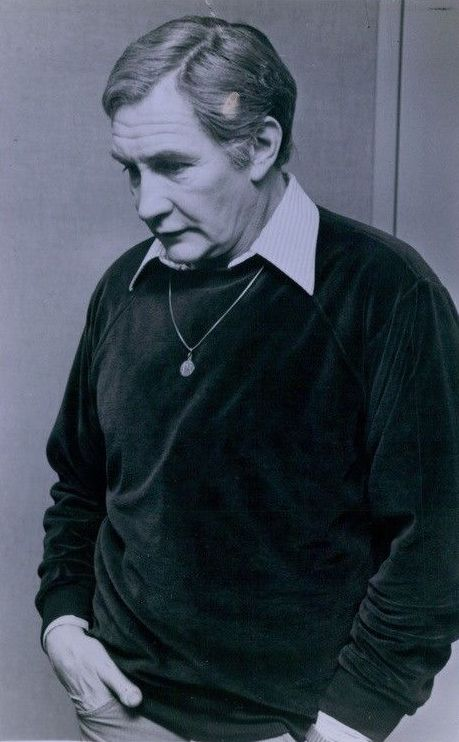
Dotrice in 1981

Roy Dotrice (26 May 1923 – 16 October 2017) was a British stage and screen actor. He played the antiquarian John Aubrey in the solo play Brief Lives. He won a Tony Award for his performance in the 2000 Broadway revival of A Moon for the Misbegotten, also appearing as Leopold Mozart in the film version of Amadeus (1984), Charles Dickens in Dickens of London (1976), and Jacob Wells/Father in the TV series Beauty and the Beast.

Late in life, he narrated a series of audiobooks for George R. R. Martin's epic fantasy series A Song of Ice and Fire, for which he holds the Guinness World Record for the most character voices by an individual for an audiobook.

== Early life ==
Dotrice was born in Guernsey, Bailiwick of Guernsey on 26 May 1923 to Neva (née Wilton; 1897–1984) and Louis Dotrice (1896–1991). He served as a wireless operator/air gunner with the Royal Air Force during the Second World War, and was imprisoned in a German prisoner of war camp from 1942 to 1945, after being shot down in an Avro Manchester R5840 of No.106 Squadron based at Coningsby, all seven airmen of the crew being taken Prisoner of War.

== Career ==
=== Radio ===
Dotrice was the voice of "Permanent Under-Secretary Sir Gregory Pitkin" in the early episodes of BBC Radio's long-running comedy The Men from the Ministry. He was succeeded by Ronald Baddiley in the role. He also played the caretaker Ramsay alongside Patricia Hayes in the Radio 2 sitcom Know Your Place.

=== Theatre ===
Dotrice was a member of the Royal Shakespeare Company and in the early 1960s played a variety of roles, including Caliban in The Tempest, opposite Tom Fleming's Prospero (dir: Peter Brook), John of Gaunt and Hotspur opposite David Warner's Richard II, and Justice Shallow, opposite Hugh Griffith as Falstaff in Henry IV, and then Edward IV in the Hall/Barton-adapted Shakespeare cycle The Wars of the Roses, later broadcast by the BBC.

Dotrice played the part of John Aubrey in Brief Lives, a one-man play devised and directed by Patrick Garland in which he held the stage for almost three hours (including the interval, during which he would feign sleep). Premiering in 1967 at the Hampstead Theatre in London, the play later toured England, before two productions on Broadway. In 1968 it moved to the Criterion Theatre in the West End, where it ran for 400 performances before transferring to the Mayfair Theatre. He revived the role in 2008, again under Patrick Garland's direction.

These runs, combined with extensive international touring, earned Dotrice a place in the Guinness World Records for the greatest number of solo performances (1,782).

His other one-man productions included Mister Lincoln in 1979, and Churchill in 1982, both premiering in Washington, D.C. at Ford's Theatre.

In 1984 he starred opposite Rosemary Harris in a production of Noël Coward's Hay Fever. He appeared in the stage production of Irving Berlin's White Christmas at The Lowry theatre in Salford from November 2009 to January 2010.

=== Television ===
In the 1970s Dotrice played Charles Dickens in the television mini-series Dickens of London. He also appeared as Albert Haddock in the BBC television adaptation of A. P. Herbert's Misleading Cases in 1971. In 1972 he played the Curé Ponosse in the BBC2 TV adaptation of Clochemerle (1972).

Dotrice played "Father" in the 1980s TV series Beauty and the Beast and Father Gary Barrett, a Catholic priest, in the 1990s series Picket Fences. His acting career dates from 1945 in a revue called Back Home, performed by former prisoners-of-war in aid of the Red Cross. In an episode of Angel, part of the Buffyverse, he played the role of Roger Wyndam-Pryce, the overbearing father of the character Wesley Wyndam-Pryce. An earlier science-fiction role was Commissioner Simmonds in two episodes of the 1970s series Space: 1999. In 1998 Dotrice appeared in three episodes of the series Hercules: The Legendary Journeys as Zeus.

In June 2010 it was announced that Dotrice would be playing the role of Grand Maester Pycelle in the HBO television series Game of Thrones, an adaptation of George R. R. Martin's A Song of Ice and Fire books. He later withdrew from the part for medical reasons and Julian Glover was cast in his place.

Shortly after filming for the second season commenced it was confirmed that Dotrice would be returning to play "Wisdom Hallyne the Pyromancer", who is featured in the episodes "The Ghost of Harrenhal" and "Blackwater".

=== Radio and audiobooks ===
In 1982 BBC Radio 4 broadcast Dotrice's reading of G.B. Edwards' novel The Book of Ebenezer Le Page in twenty-eight 15-minute parts on its Woman's Hour segment. The producer subsequently wrote that the serialisation was "without question the most popular serial I have ever done in the 500 or so I have produced in the last 21 years ...".

He subsequently performed "The Islander", a stage version of The Book of Ebenezer Le Page, to critical success at the Theatre Royal Lincoln. In 2012 AudioGO produced a complete and unabridged recording of Ebenezer Le Page, which is available on Audible.

Dotrice recorded audiobooks for each book in George R. R. Martin's series A Song of Ice and Fire. In 2005, when he was replaced by John Lee for the fourth installment, A Feast for Crows, due to his health, fans petitioned and argued for a re-release with Dotrice once he was able to perform again. Random House, the publisher, relented and Dotrice's version was released in 2011. That same year, he was awarded the world record for most character voices in an audiobook for his recording of A Game of Thrones, which contained 224.

Dotrice also narrated many storybook adaptations for Disney Records, including The Little Mermaid and Pooh's Heffalump Movie, for which he was nominated for a Grammy Award.

== Personal life and death ==
Dotrice was married to Kay Newman (1929–2007), a television and stage actress, from 1947 until her death in 2007. They had three daughters—Michele, Yvette and Karen—all of whom have acted at various times in their lives. He was the father-in-law of actors Edward Woodward (Michele) and Alex Hyde-White (Karen).

For more than twenty five years, Dotrice was a resident of the Highland Garden Hotel in Los Angeles where he lived with his wife in room 222, a suite once occupied by L Ron Hubbard.

Dotrice was appointed Officer of the Order of the British Empire (OBE) in the 2008 New Year Honours. He died on 16 October 2017 in London, aged 94.

== Filmography ==
=== Film ===
Roy Dotrice's theatrical film credits include:*Sources:

- The Heroes of Telemark (1965) – Jensen
- A Twist of Sand (1968) – David Garland
- Lock Up Your Daughters (1969) – Gossip
- The Buttercup Chain (1970) – Martin Carr-Gibbons
- Toomorrow (1970) – John Williams
- Nicholas and Alexandra (1971) – General Alexeiev
- Hændeligt uheld [One of those Things] (1971 Danish film) - Henrik Vinther
- Tales From The Crypt (1972) – Charles Gregory (segment 4 "Wish You Were Here")
- Hide and Seek (1972) – Mr Grimes
- Saturn 3 (1980, voice overdub of Harvey Keitel) – Benson (voice, uncredited)
- Cheech & Chong's The Corsican Brothers (1984) – The Evil Fuckaire/Ye Old Jailer
- Amadeus (1984) – Leopold Mozart
- Eliminators (1986) – Abbott Reeves
- Suburban Commando (1991) – Zanuck
- The Cutting Edge (1992) – Anton Pamchenko
- Swimming with Sharks (1994) – Cyrus Miles
- The Scarlet Letter (1995) – Rev Thomas Cheever
- Alien Hunter (2003) – Dr John Bachman
- These Foolish Things (2006) – Lord Carter
- Played (2006) – Jack Rawlings
- Go Go Tales (2007) – Jay
- Hellboy II: The Golden Army (2008) – King Balor

=== Television ===
Roy Dotrice television credits
Year	Title	Role	Notes
1957	The Adventure	Sailor	TV movie
1957	Treasure Island	Abe Gray	TV miniseries
1959	A Midsummer Night's Dream	Egeus	TV movie
1962	The Cherry Orchard	Firs	TV movie
1963	Boyd Q.C.	Mr. Jacobs	Episode: "What the Eye Doesn't See"
1965	Armchair Theatre	Donald Timwood	Story: "A Cold Peace"
1965- 1966	The Wars of the Roses	King Edward IV/ Jack Cade	6 episodes
1966	The Liars	Fogarty	1 episode
1966	Public Eye	Donald Scott	Episode: "Don't Forget You're Mine"
1966	Theatre 625	Robinson	Story: "Amerika"
1967	Armchair Theatre	Aaron Toft	Story: "I'am Osango"
1967	The Wednesday Play	Dad	Story: "Dial Rudolph Valentino One One"
1967- 1971	A.P. Herbert's Misleading Cases	Albert Haddock	19 episodes (3 series)
1968	Late Night Horror	Douglas Stone	Story: "The Kiss of Blood"
1969	The Gold Robbers	Freddy Lamb	Episode: "Crack Shot"
1969	Imperial Palace	Evelyn Orchram	4 episodes
1970	Tales of Unease	Kayo Hathaway	Story: "Bad Bad Jo Jo"
1971	The Rivals of Sherlock Holmes	Simon Crane	Story: "The Duchess of Wiltshire's Diamonds"
1972	Clochemerle	Curé Ponosse	8 episodes
1975	Space: 1999	Commissioner Gerald Simmonds	2 episodes
1976	Dickens of London	Charles Dickens / Mr. John Dickens	13 episodes
1976	Laurence Olivier Presents	Sir Timothy Farrar	Story: "Hindle Wakes"
1976- 1979	Sykes	The Tramp	2 episodes
1981	Family Reunion	Lester Frye	TV movie
1981	Magnum, P.I.	Harcourt	Episode: "Tropical Madness"
1983	Tales of the Gold Monkey	Lord Hedriks	Episode: "God Save the Queen"
1984	Remington Steele	Victor Janoff	Episode: "Steele Eligible"
1984	Hart to Hart	Courtney Peterson	Episode: "Max's Waltz"
1986	The A-Team	Charles Jourdan	Episode: "The Spy Who Mugged Me"
1986	Shaka Zulu	George IV	TV miniseries
1986	The Wizard	Troyan	3 episodes
1987	Faerie Tale Theatre	The King / Peter Vanderdonk	2 episodes "The Dancing Princesses" "Rip Van Winkle"
1987	Tales from the Darkside	Vampire Count Jeffrey Draco	Story: "My Ghostwriter - The Vampire"
1987- 1990	Beauty and the Beast	Jacob "Father" Wells	55 episodes
1989	The Equalizer	Charlie McGuinness	Episode: "Trial by Ordeal"
1989	Nighmare Classics	Leo	Story: "Carmilla"
1990	Hunter	Bishop Pine	Episode: "Final Confession"
1990	Murder, She Wrote	Professor Chandler Fitzpatrick	Episode: "The Great Twain Robbery"
1991	For the Greater Good	Charles Truman MP	3 episodes
1992- 1993	Going to Extremes	Doctor Croft	17 episodes
1993	Murder, She Wrote	Dr Howard Sorenson	Episode: "The Legacy of Borbey House"
1993- 1996	Picket Fences	Father Gary Barrett	15 episodes
1994	Children of the Dark	Dr Burnham	TV movie
1994	Wings	Pete	Episode: "The Faygitive"
1994	L.A. Law	Alex Vedder	Episode: "McKenzie, Brackman, Barnum and Bailey"
1995	Babylon 5	Frederick Lantz	Episode: "The Fall of Night"
1995	Batman: The Animated Series	Frederick	Episode: "The Lion and the Unicorn"
1995	Murder, She Wrote	Dr Myles Purcell	Episode: "School for Murder"
1996	Mr. & Mrs. Smith	Mr Big	12 episodes
1996	Tales from the Crypt	Major Nicholson	Story: "Escape"
1997	Spider-Man: The Animated Series	Keene Marlow / The Destroyer	4 episodes
1998	Like Father, Like Santa	Ambrose Booth	TV movie
1998	Hercules: The Legendary Journeys	Zeus	3 episodes
1999	Sliders	Archibald Chandler	Episode: "Data World"
2000	Madigan Men	Seamus Madigan	12 episodes
2000	Sliders	Marc LeBeau	Episode: "The Seer"
2001	Touched by an Angel	Micah	Episode: "Holy of Holies"
2003	Angel	Roger Wyndam-Pryce	1 episode
2003	Just Shoot Me!	Jarvis Leeds	Episode: "Just Shoot Me"
2003	Doctors	Tomasz Zelinksy	Episode: "Roots"
2004	Life Begins	Frank Buchanan	8 episodes
2006	La Femme Musketeer	Commander Finot (uncredited)	TV miniseries
2006	Heartbeat	Mr Carter	Episode: "Give Peace a Chance"
2012	Game of Thrones	Hallyne	2 episodes

=== Audiobooks ===
Roy Dotrice's audiobook voice acting credits include:

- Watership Down
- The Prince and the Pauper
- The Book of Ebenezer Le Page
- The Death Gate Cycle Vol. 4: Serpent Mage
- A Song of Ice and Fire
