= Piccadilly Third Stop =

1960 British film by Wolf Rilla

- Original British quad poster by Nicola Simbari
- Directed by: Wolf Rilla
- Written by: Leigh Vance
- Produced by: Norman Williams; Sydney Box
- Starring: Terence Morgan; Yoko Tani; John Crawford; Mai Zetterling
- Cinematography: Ernest Steward
- Edited by: Bernard Gribble
- Music by: Philip Green
- Production companies: Ethiro-Alliance; Sydney Box Associates
- Distributed by: J. Arthur Rank Film Distributors
- Release date: 6 September 1960 (London)
- Running time: 86 minutes
- Country: United Kingdom
- Language: English

Piccadilly Third Stop is a 1960 British thriller film directed by Wolf Rilla and starring Terence Morgan, Yoko Tani and John Crawford. It was written by Leigh Vance. A wealthy playboy hires a gang of criminals to help him steal £100,000.

== Plot ==
Crook Dominic Colpoys-Owen has his eye on the loot inside an embassy in London after an ambassador's daughter, Seraphina, unwittingly reveals that her father, away on business, has left big money behind in the safe. Colpoys-Owen works his smooth-talking charm on the innocent girl, who becomes so infatuated that she agrees to help his gang with its plan. This involves a robbery from the Knightsbridge embassy via the London Underground.

== Cast ==
- Terence Morgan as Dominic Colpoys-Owen
- Yoko Tani as Seraphina Yokami
- John Crawford as Joe Pready
- Mai Zetterling as Christine Pready
- William Hartnell as Colonel Whitfield
- Dennis Price as Edward
- Ann Lynn as Mouse
- Charles Kay as Toddy
- Doug Robinson as Albert
- Gillian Maude as Bride's mother
- Trevor Reid as Bride's father
- Ronald Leigh-Hunt as Police Sergeant
- Tony Hawes as Harry Prentice
- Clement Freud as Chemin de Fer dealer
- Judy Huxtable as Angela Vaughan

== Production ==
The film was shot at Pinewood Studios and on location around London, including numerous locations around Belgravia. Holborn tube station filled in as the fictional "Belgravia station" on the Piccadilly line. The film's sets were designed by the art director Ernest Archer. Filming took place in April 1960. It was made by the same producer and writer as The Shakedown.

The original title was Time to Kill. Filming was to have begun on 3 March but original director John Lemont dropped out to make another film written by Leigh Vance, Cry Wolf which became The Frightened City.

When Terence Morgan's character is standing in the tube station eyeing the station staff, he is positioned next to some film posters on the station's walls. At least one of the posters next to him is from an actual film that Terence Morgan had starred in earlier that year, The Shakedown (1959).

== Critical reception ==
Variety wrote "there has been a recent spate of pix dealing with the activities of gangs of crooks whose daring robberies go astray and lead to a sock climax before justice is served. “Piccadilly Third Stop” hardly pretends to be in the first league with such films, but it’s brisk enough with good performances. It should be a very acceptable booking for popular houses."

The Monthly Film Bulletin wrote: "With leading characters as repulsive as the slimy Dominic and the boorish Preedy, and a background of theft, blackmail, watchsmuggling, gambling parties, bounced cheques and adultery, not even Yoko Tani's appealing tears and a bushel of contemporary props can make much of this film attractive. Wolf Rilla's direction has a certain speed and polish, however, and the tube station chase at the end doesn't lack excitement. William Hartnell as a cracksman colonel, oddly reminiscent of Olivier's Archie Rice, and Miss Tani do well in two of the few sympathetic parts."

Picture Show gave the film 2/5 stars, writing: "competently made, acted and directed but thoroughly unpleasant drama. ... It leaves a nasty taste in the mouth."

Variety called it "a not-bad heist tale with a very strong cast."

AllMovie called the film a "fast-paced, standard crime story".

The Radio Times wrote: "The late 1950s were an exciting time for British cinema with 'social realist' pictures such as Room at the Top (1959) and Look Back in Anger (1959) receiving international acclaim. This plodding low-budget thriller is more typical of Britain's tired output in other genres, however, with Terence Morgan playing a London lowlife who dates ambassador's daughter Yoko Tani in order to gain access to the embassy safe. Dennis Price, William Hartnell and Mai Zetterling are among those who obviously needed the work."

== Box office ==
The film was released on a double bill with a German movie Three Moves to Freedom. In October 1960 Kinematograph Weekly reported this double bill "hasn’t brought home the bacon. The former is a fast-moving crime melo¬ drama, but the second, an anti-Nazi melodrama, dawdles."
