= Renown Pictures =

British film company

Renown Pictures Corporation
- Type: Film distributor
- Industry: Film
- Founded: 1938; 88 years ago
- Founder: George Minter
- Headquarters: UK
- Website: renownfilms.co.uk

Renown Pictures Corporation is a British film distributor founded by producer George Minter in 1938.

== Releases ==
Renown's releases include:

- Scrooge (1951)
- Grand National Night (1953)
- Dance, Little Lady (1954)
- Svengali (1954)
- It's a Wonderful World (1956)
- Tread Softly Stranger (1958)
- Beat Girl (1959)
- Beyond This Place (1959)

== See also ==
- Talking Pictures TV
