= Gene Anderson (actress) =

British actress (1931–1965)

- Born: 28 March 1931; London, England
- Died: 5 May 1965 (aged 34); London, England
- Education: Royal Central School of Speech and Drama
- Occupation: Actress
- Years active: 1953–1965
- Spouse: Edward Judd
- Children: 1

Gene Anderson (28 March 1931, London — 5 May 1965, London) was an English actress who had a career in television, film, and theatre from the early 1950s up until her death in 1965 at the age of 34. She was the first wife of actor Edward Judd, she is best known for her performances in the films The Long Haul (1957) and The Day the Earth Caught Fire (1961). A main cast member of the 1950s British television dramas The Crime of the Century and A Mask for Alexis, she was a frequent guest actress on British television series in the 1950s and 1960s. Also active on stage, Anderson created the role of Marie Charlet in the world premiere of Pierre La Mure's Monsieur Toulouse at the Connaught Theatre in 1957. In 1962 she portrayed Euphrenia in the first modern revival of John Ford's 1633 tragedy The Broken Heart at the Chichester Festival Theatre, in a production directed by and starring Laurence Olivier. In the West End she portrayed the central role of the Nurse in the UK premiere of Edward Albee's The Death of Bessie Smith in 1961 and the role of Kate Croy in the 1963 West End adaptation of Henry James's The Wings of the Dove.

== Career ==
Born in London, Anderson was trained as an actress at the Royal Central School of Speech and Drama (then known as the Central School of Dramatic Art). She made her film debut in the small role of June Maple in Guy Hamilton's 1953 drama film The Intruder. Her first larger screen role came later that year in the supporting role of Renee Wexford in the crime film Flannelfoot. Her first leading part in a film was as Pamela in 1954's Tale of Three Women. This was followed by the role of Connie Miller in The Long Haul (1957) in which she portrayed the wife of Victor Mature's character Harry Miller, and the part of Nurse Ruth Worth in the British war film Yangtse Incident: The Story of H.M.S. Amethyst (1957). She later portrayed Zena in The Shakedown (1959) and May in the 1961 British disaster film The Day the Earth Caught Fire. Her final film roles was as Jean Tredgar in Lance Comfort's drama The Break.

Anderson was a main cast member of the 1950s British television drama The Crime of the Century, portraying the role of Clare Pinnock. She portrayed the lead roles of Stella in the 1956 television film Tearaway and Maria in Colin Morris's 1957 television film Italian Love Story; both produced for BBC Television. In 1959 she portrayed Brenda Carpenter in the television series A Mask for Alexis. In 1961 she starred in the episode "The Money Makers" for the British anthology series Armchair Mystery Theatre. She performed the role of Miss Mathieson in the BBC's 1964 television adaptation of N. C. Hunter's A Day by the Sea. In 1965 she starred as Livia in a television adaptation of Thomas Middleton's 1657 play Women Beware Women for Granada Television's Play of the Week. She appeared as a guest actress in several British serials in the 1950s and 1960s, including Z-Cars and Maigret among others.

On stage, Anderson began her career performing at the Capitol Theatre, Manchester in the early 1950s. She portrayed the role of 'La belle Dame' in Kevin McGarry's Money for Jam at the Q Theatre in London in 1954. In 1956 she starred in three plays directed by Peter Wood for the Worthing Theatre Company at the Connaught Theatre; Jack Popplewell's Dead on Nine; Arnold Ridley's 1940 stage adaptation of Agatha Christie's 1932 novel Peril at End House; and the title character in Vera Caspary's Laura. In 1957 she portrayed Nicole in Armand Salacrou's No Laughing Matter at the Arts Theatre in London. She returned to the Connaught Theatre in 1957 to portray Marie Charlet in the world premiere of Pierre La Mure's Monsieur Toulouse. The production starred Anderson and Ian Holm and centred on the artist Henri de Toulouse-Lautrec and his relationship with Marie Charlet.

In 1961 Anderson appeared at the West End's Royal Court Theatre as the nurse in Edward Albee's The Death of Bessie Smith. In 1962 she starred as Euphrenia in a revival of John Ford's 1633 tragedy The Broken Heart at the Chichester Festival Theatre; a production which was directed by Laurence Olivier who also performed the roles of the Prologue and Bassanes. In 1963 she portrayed Kate Croy in Christopher Taylor's adaptation of Henry James's The Wings of the Dove at the West End's Lyric Theatre, London. Directed by Frith Banbury, it also starred Susannah York as Milly Theale, Wendy Hiller as Susan Shephard, Elspeth March as Maud Lowder, and James Donald as Merton Densher.

== Personal life and death ==
Anderson died of a cerebral hemorrhage while rehearsing for a television episode appearance in London on May 5, 1965 at the age of 34. She was married to actor Edward Judd with whom she had a daughter.
