= Enid Lorimer =

Australian actress (1887–1982)

Enid Lorimer OAM
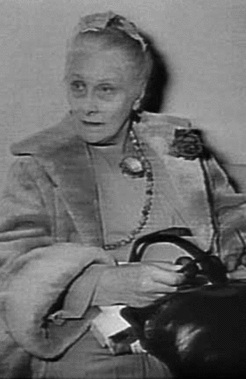
- Born: May Enid Bosworth Nunn; 27 November 1887; London, United Kingdom
- Died: 15 July 1982 (aged 94); Wahroonga, New South Wales, Australia
- Other name: Ellen Bosworth (pen name)
- Citizenship: Australian
- Occupations: Actress; producer; writer; teacher; theosophist
- Years active: C. 1910-1979
- Spouse: Count Harold Augustavas Wentworth Zeffri. (died 1926)
- Children: 1 (adopted)
- Awards: Chips Rafferty Memorial Award
- Website: enidlorimer.com

Enid Bosworth Lorimer (born Enid Bosworth Nunn) 27 December 1887 – 15 July 1982), was an English-born stage, radio, television and film actress, director, producer, writer, teacher and theosophist. She worked in her native England and also in Australia.

She was a contemporary of Dame Sybil Thorndike and Dame Lilian Braithwaite.

== Early life ==
Lorimer was born on 27 November 1887, in London, United Kingdom. Her father was Harold Marcus Nunn and her mother was Helen Louise Fowler (née Bosworth) and she had a younger sister.

Brought up in comfortable and privileged circumstances, her early education was supervised by a governess. She later attended a boarding school in Folkestone, Kent, and a finishing school in Switzerland where she learned French and German.

In London, Lorimer trained under renowned teacher Elsie Fogerty, but when her father’s opposition to an acting career became am issue, she left home. She subsequently trained at Her Majesty's Theatre as a Shakespearean actress. Her first role was a walk-on part under Sir Herbert Beerbohm Tree.

== Career ==
Lorimer's career as an actress lasted for some 70 years. She first took stage drama studies in the United Kingdom, and became an understudy to Phyllis Neilson-Terry. She joined the touring company of Laurence Irving and during the war years she worked in film production in Britain assisting Dame Ellen Terry. She arrived in Sydney, Australia in November 1923 to serve as Art Director at the Star Amphitheatre, Balmoral.

Lorimer produced the first impromptu radio play at 2GB in 1925. She was well known for her role as Ettie in the radio serial Dr. Mac with Lou Vernon, between 1940 and 1952.

She starred in numerous Australian television programmes, such as Motel, Spyforce, Homicide, Division 4 and Cop Shop, as well as many theatrical stage plays, and in 1966 she appeared as a narrator in fourteen episodes of the BBC children's television programme Jackanory. Up until her 85th birthday in 1973, Lorimer was very active within the entertainment industry and would not entertain the prospect of retirement, despite self-admitted signs of "phasing out". Her final film appearance was in The Odd Angry Shot.

In her later years, she gradually retired from acting and instead started writing children's books, such as the series Shelley (which was based on her granddaughter), under the pseudonym of Ellen Bosworth, publishing 3 books. Many of her books were best-sellers in Australia.

During her lifetime, Lorimer also worked as a teacher and a theosophist.

== Recognition ==
Lorimer was awarded the Chips Rafferty Memorial Award in 1981 and the Medal of the Order of Australia (OAM) for her service towards the performing arts on 14 June 1982.

Enid Lorimer Circuit, in the Canberra suburb of Chisholm, is named in her honour.

== Personal life ==
Lorimer met fellow actor Henry Augustavus Wentworth Zerffi, a Londoner of Hungarian-Jewish extraction, while she was acting with Laurence Irving's touring company. They were married on 27 July 1912 at St Paul’s Presbyterian Church, in Harrogate, North Yorkshire. Zerffi served in the war, but upon his return, their marriage did not last. In 1926, severely affected by war injuries, Zerffi shot his mother, before committing suicide, prompting Lorimer to return to England in 1926.

== Death ==
Lorimer died on 15 July 1982 at a private hospital in Wahroonga, New South Wales. A private funeral was held for her; only six people attended.

== Filmography ==
=== Film ===
Year	Title	Role	Type
1949	Strong Is the Seed (aka The Farrer Story)		Feature film
1956	Find the Lady	Miss Rees (uncredited)	Feature film
1958	Carve Her Name With Pride	Madame Renaud (uncredited)	Feature film
1959	Witness in the Dark	Mrs. Temple	Feature film
1964	The Sicilians	Old Lady	Feature film

=== Television ===
Year	Title	Role	Type
1953	The Golden Head	Dame Martha Holloway	TV film
1953	Seven Little Australians	Mrs. Fitzroy-Brown	1 episode
1953	The Story of the Treasure Seekers	The Lady	1 episode
1954	A Castle and Sixpence	Mrs. Pigmarsh	1 episode
1955	Absent-Minded Anna	Mrs. Graham	TV film
1955	The Vice	Madame Larvin / Mrs. Steel / Mrs. McPhail	3 episodes
1955	The Sleeping Beauty	The Nurse	TV film
1955	Count of Twelve	Mrs. McPhail	Episode: ’The Count of Twelve‘
1956	The Errol Flynn Theatre	Donya	1 episode
1957–1967	ITV Play of the Week	Mookie / Rebecca Nurse / Ellen Carmichael	3 episodes
1956	Armchair Theatre	Mrs. Danishev	1 episode
1957	Overseas Press Club - Exclusive	Mrs. Klaus / Concierge	2 episodes
1957	O.S.S.	Madame Mureaux	1 episode
1957	White Hunter	Matron	1 episode
1958	Television World Theatre	Woman of Troy	1 episode
1958	Charles And Mary	Mrs. Lamb	TV film
1958	Uncertain Mercy	Frau Kowalski	TV film
1959	World Theatre	Brand's Mother	1 episode
1959	Antigone	Eurydice	TV film
1959	The Flying Doctor	Emily Gudgeon	1 episode
1961	Corinth House	Miss Malleson	Teleplay
1961	Harlequinade	Dame Maud	Teleplay
1961	Traveller Without Luggage	The Mother	TV film
1962	The Last Man Out	Madame Matilde	1 episode
1963	Harpers Went Out	Evelyn Bentley	1 episode
1963	Man of the World	Miss Bentley	1 episode
1963	The Queen and The Rebels	Peasant Woman	1 episode
1963–1965	Hugh and I	Auntie Maude	2 episodes
1964–1967	Play School	Storyteller	34 episodes
1966	Theatre 625	Anna Semionovna	1 episode
1966	The Troubleshooters	Mrs. Thornton	1 episode
1966	Jackanory	Storyteller	14 episodes
1966	Meet the Wife	Madame	1 episode
1966	The New Inferno	The Company	TV film
1967	The Wednesday Play	Frau Cornelissen	1 episode
1967	Beggar My Neighbour	Aunt Jess	1 episode
1967	The Avengers	Nanny Roberts	1 episode
1967	Uncle Vanya	Maria Wassiljewna Woynitsky	TV film
1967	Les Misérables	Baptistine	Miniseries, 1 episode
1968–1974	Homicide	Mrs. Lines / Mrs. Simpson / Mrs. James / 'Gran' Garret / Mrs. Jackson / Molly Bishop / Jane Foster	7 episodes
1968	Motel	Bunty Creighton	2 episodes
1969	Riptide	Dora Binney	1 episode
1969	Delta	Hilda	1 episode
1969	Skippy	Mrs. Kearney	1 episode
1970; 1974	Division 4	Aunt Bertha / Mrs. Mathews	2 episodes
1970	The Link Men		1 episode
1972	The Survivor	Belle Leeming	Teleplay
1972	Spyforce	Miss Smith	1 episode
1972	Number 96	Mrs Harvey	TV series
1972	The Hands of Cormac Joyce	Mrs. Reece	TV film
1973	Boney	Mrs. Thompson	1 episode
1974	The Evil Touch	Lavinia Pfeiffer	1 episode
1974	Matlock Police	Mrs. Dawson	1 episode
1974	Human Target		TV film
1975	Certain Women		1 episode
1975	Quality of Mercy		Episode 2: "The Love Job"
1976	Luke's Kingdom	Nanny	Miniseries, 1 episode
1976	Is There Anybody There?		TV film
1977	Mama's Gone A-Hunting	Old Woman in Elevator (uncredited)	TV film
1978	Loss of Innocence	Gran	Miniseries, 2 episodes
1978	Case for the Defence	Mrs. Lattimer	1 episode
1978	The Young Doctors	Amelia Frost	2 episodes

== Theatre ==
=== As actor ===
Year	Title	Role	Type
1913	Troilus and Cressida	Helen	Shakespeare Memorial Theatre, Stratford with RSC
1934	The Squall	Dolores Mendez	Criterion Theatre, Sydney
1940	The Importance of Being Earnest		Independent Theatre, Sydney
1944; 1945	Uncle Harry	Hester	Killara Soldiers Memorial Hall, Sydney, St. John's Hall, Sydney, Theatre Royal, Sydney with Kuring-gai Theatre Guild & Metropolitan Players
1945	Suspect		Killara Soldiers Memorial Hall, Sydney with Kuring-gai Theatre Guild & Metropolitan Players
1948	The Little Foxes		Princess Theatre, Melbourne
1950; 1963	Harvey		Theatre Royal, Adelaide, Theatre Royal Sydney, The Old Vic Theatre, London with J. C. Williamson's
1959	Brand	Brand's Mother	Lyric Theatre, Hammersmith with 59 Theatre Company
1960	A Passage to India	Mrs Moore	Comedy Theatre, London
1963	Uncle Vanya	Marya Vassilyevna Voynitsky (Maman)	Chichester Festival Theatre, The Old Vic, London, Theatre Royal, Newcastle upon Tyne with Royal National Theatre
1963–1964	Hamlet	Extra	National Theatre, London, The Old Vic, London
1964–1965	Hobson's Choice	Mrs Hepworth	National Theatre, London, The Old Vic, London
1964	The Dutch Courtesan	Putifer	National Theatre, London, The Old Vic, London, Chichester Festival Theatre

=== As director / playwright / producer ===
Year	Title	Role	Type
1933	Four One Act Plays	Director	St James' Hall, Sydney with Impressionist Theatre
1933	The Mills of God	Producer	Studio Theatre Club, Sydney
1933	Murder	Playwright / producer	Studio Theatre Club, Sydney
1933	The Morning After Christmas Eve	Producer	Studio Theatre Club, Sydney
1934	Restitution	Director	Studio Theatre Club, Sydney
1934	Repression	Director	Studio Theatre Club, Sydney
1934	Life Goes On!	Director / playwright	Studio Theatre Club, Sydney
1934; 1939	The Spartan Girl	Director	Studio Theatre Club, Sydney, St James' Hall, Sydney
1934	Proxy	Director	Studio Theatre Club, Sydney
1934	Judas Was a Gentleman	Director	Studio Theatre Club, Sydney
1934	The Second Rhapsody	Director	Studio Theatre Club, Sydney
1935	Wool Gathering	Director	Emerson Hall, Sydney with Studio Theatre Club
1936	Once in a Blue Moon	Playwright	Australian Hall, Sydney
1939	The Gigolo Husband	Director	Little Theatre, Sydney
1943	Counter Attack	Producer	New Theatre, Sydney
1945	The Doctor's Dilemma	Producer	Independent Theatre, Sydney
1946	Oscar Wilde	Director	Killara Soldiers Memorial Hall, Sydney, Independent Theatre, Sydney

== Radio (partial) ==
=== As actor ===
Year	Title	Role	Type
1940–1952	Doctor Mac	Ettie	

=== As director ===
Year	Title	Role	Type
1946	Oscar Wilde	Director	Sydney Radio Theatre
