= Peggy Cummins =

British actress (1925–2017)

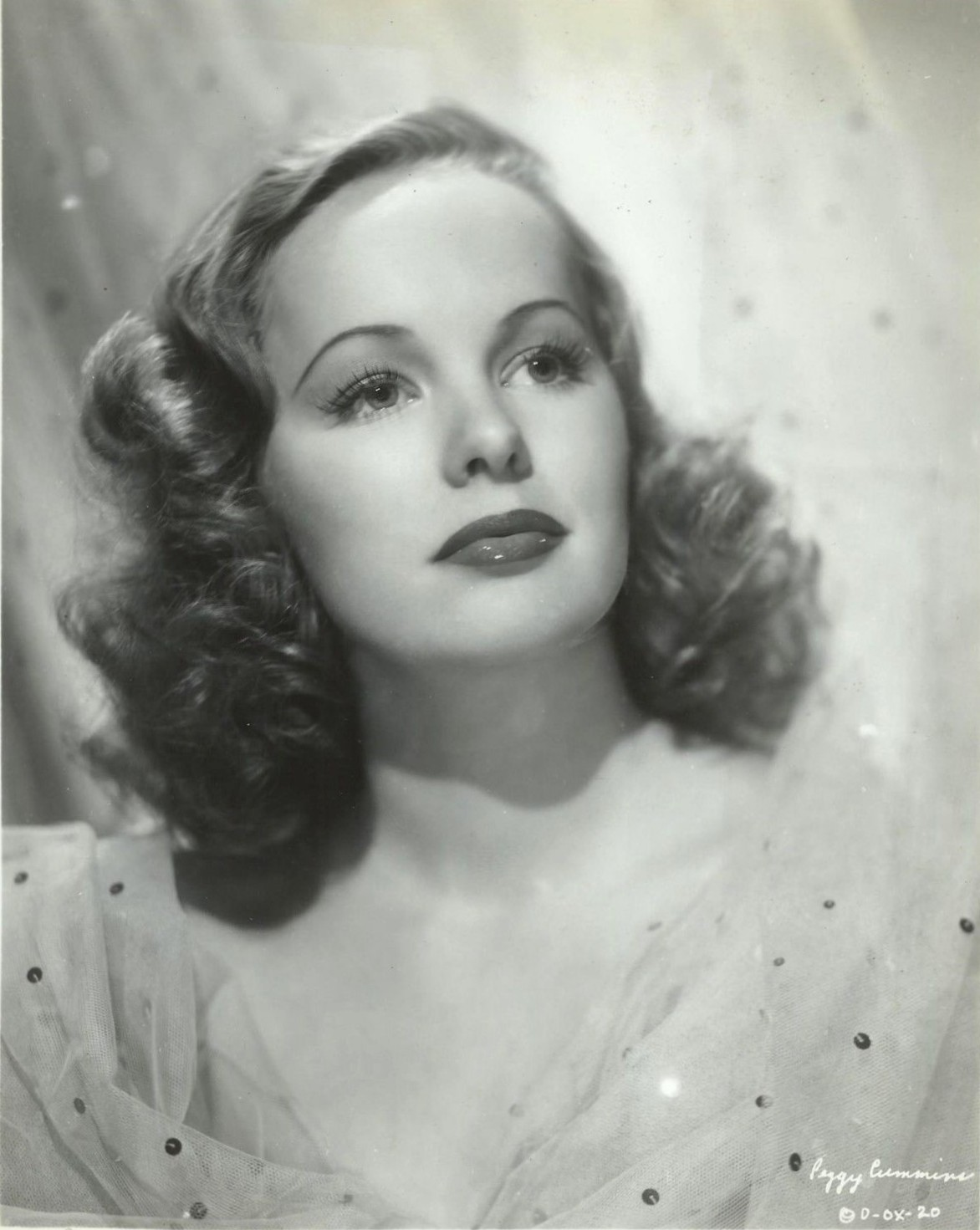
- Cummins in 1950
- Born: Augusta Margaret Diane Fuller; 18 December 1925; Prestatyn, Denbighshire, Wales
- Died: 29 December 2017 (aged 92); London, England
- Occupation: Actress
- Years active: 1940–1965
- Spouse: William Herbert Derek Dunnett (m. 1950; died 2000)
- Children: 2

Peggy Cummins (born Augusta Margaret Diane Fuller; 18 December 1925 – 29 December 2017) was an Irish actress, born in Wales, who is best known for her performance in Joseph H. Lewis's Gun Crazy (1950), playing a trigger-happy femme fatale, who robs banks with her lover. In 2020, she was listed at number 16 on The Irish Times list of Ireland's greatest film actors.

== Biography ==
=== Early life ===
Cummins was born Augusta Margaret Diane Fuller in Prestatyn, Denbighshire, Wales. Her Irish parents were visiting there when a storm kept them from returning to their home in Dublin.

She lived most of her early life in Killiney, Dublin, where she was educated, and later in London. Her father was Dublin-born Franklin Bland Fuller, who was a grandson of architect James Franklin Fuller. Her mother was actress Margaret Cummins, who played such film roles as Anna in Smart Woman and Emily in The Sign of the Ram (both 1948).

=== Early acting career ===
There is a legend that actor Patrick Brock noticed Cummins at a Dublin tram stop and introduced her to Dublin's Gate Theatre Company, but she told Barbara Roisman Cooper when interviewed, aged 88: "That is absolutely nonsense." As a child in Dublin, she attended the Abbey School of Ballet. From there she was spotted and chosen for a non-speaking role in The Duchess of Malfi at the Gate Theatre. "I played one of the children, only seen in silhouette because they had been murdered ... that was my start in the theatre." Cummins’ London stage debut was in the role of Maryann, the juvenile lead in Let’s Pretend, a children's revue that opened at the St James's Theatre on her 13th birthday.

On the basis of this she was cast in the British film directed by Herbert Mason, Dr. O'Dowd (1940). As part of an agreement with the London County Council, Cummins was limited to five hours of filming per day and had to be supervised by a governess. Cummins had supporting roles in Salute John Citizen (1942) and Old Mother Riley Detective (1943).

She appeared on the London stage in 1943 aged 17, playing the part of 12-year-old Fuffy in Junior Miss at the Saville Theatre and in the title role of Alice in Wonderland in 1944 at the Palace Theatre.

Her first major film was English Without Tears (1944) with Michael Wilding and Lilli Palmer, directed by Harold French and released in the United States as Her Man Gilbey. She followed this with Welcome, Mr. Washington (1944).

=== 20th Century Fox ===
In October 1945, Cummins was brought to Hollywood by Darryl F. Zanuck, head of 20th Century-Fox, not initially – as is widely believed – to play Amber in Kathleen Winsor's Forever Amber (1947). She tested for a role in Cluny Brown (1946) before being considered for Amber. Production started in January 1946, but because she was considered "too young", she was soon replaced by Linda Darnell.

Zanuck then gave her a lead role in a mystery, Moss Rose (1947), directed by Gregory Ratoff, which was a financial disappointment. He tried her in two films directed by Joseph L. Mankiewicz, The Late George Apley (1947), playing the daughter of Ronald Colman, and Escape (1948), co starring with Rex Harrison. Cummins then appeared with Charles Coburn in Green Grass of Wyoming (1948), a sequel to My Friend Flicka released in 1943.

Cummins returned to England to appear in That Dangerous Age (1948) for Alexander Korda, directed by Gregory Ratoff) with Myrna Loy and Roger Livesey. She went back to the US for Gun Crazy (1950), a story about the crime-spree of a gun-toting husband and wife. "I loved being in Hollywood", she told The Sunday Times a few years before she died, but it was her last film shot in the United States.

=== Return to Britain ===
She returned to London in 1950 to marry and work in British films. She made My Daughter Joy (1950) for Korda and Ratoff, co-starring with Edward G. Robinson and starred in Who Goes There! (1952) for Korda and Street Corner (1953) for Muriel Box. Around the same time, she appeared in Meet Mr. Lucifer, an Ealing Studios comedy, and Always a Bride with Ronald Squire (both also 1953).

Cummins was in The Love Lottery (1954) with David Niven, and To Dorothy a Son (1954) with Shelley Winters and John Gregson. She starred in The March Hare (1956) with Terence Morgan, and Carry On Admiral (1957) with David Tomlinson.

She later starred alongside Dana Andrews in the horror film Night of the Demon (1957), directed by Jacques Tourneur, and Hell Drivers (also 1957), which featured Stanley Baker, Patrick McGoohan, and Herbert Lom.

Cummins went back to comedies with The Captain's Table (1959), Your Money or Your Wife (1960), and Dentist in the Chair (1960). Her last film was Darcy Conyers' In the Doghouse (1961), alongside Leslie Phillips.

In 1964 Cummins was reunited with Herbert Lom in an episode of the British TV series The Human Jungle.

=== Gun Crazy ===
In 1998, Gun Crazy (1950) was selected for preservation in the United States National Film Registry by the Library of Congress, as being "culturally, historically, or aesthetically significant." Michael Adams wrote in Movieline in August 2009 that the film was "directed by B-movie specialist Joseph H. Lewis from a script co-written by MacKinlay Kantor and blacklisted Dalton Trumbo, "fronted" by his friend Millard Kaufman. Gun Crazy was made for $400,000 in 30 days in 1949.

Movieline found Cummins in 2009, still healthy. "It was a great part", she said of Annie Laurie Starr. "It was a brilliant story from a brilliant writer. We had a very good director and a great cameraman. I think John Dall and myself were in those days quite well-suited in the parts we had." The film played at the British Film Institute in London in February 2009. At the screening, Cummins viewed the film with an audience for the first time in six decades.

=== Night of the Demon ===
On 14 June 2006, she appeared as guest of honour at a special screening of Night of the Demon in Borehamwood, Hertfordshire, hosted by the Elstree Film and Television Heritage Group. At the screening, she answered questions from the audience before viewing the film for the first time. She said she had never worked with her co-star Dana Andrews before, though she knew and liked him; they remained friends for the rest of his life.

On 29 September 2010, Cummins introduced the film Street Corner (1953) as part of the Capital Tales Event at BFI Southbank London hosted by Curator Jo Botting. She played Bridget Foster in the film written by Muriel and Sydney Box and directed by Muriel Box.

On 29 August 2013, Cummins introduced the world premiere of a digital remastering of Night of the Demon, screened by the British Film Institute in the courtyard of the British Museum. The screening location features prominently in the film, with shots of the courtyard before a key scene in which the psychologist Holden meets occultist Karswell for the first time in the British Library, which until 1998 was housed within the museum.

== Personal life ==
In 1954, she became the First Honorary Commander of the 582d Air Resupply Group at RAF Molesworth, England, designated special operations by the United States Air Force.

She was married to businessman Derek Dunnett (William Herbert Derek Dunnett) from 1950 until his death in 2000. The couple had two children; a son in 1954, and a daughter in 1962.

Cummins' film career ended in 1961, although she made a handful of television appearances up to the mid-1960s. During the 1970s, Cummins was active in a national charity, Stars Organisation for Spastics, raising money and chairing the management committee of a holiday centre for children with disabilities in Sussex. The charity, known as SOS, became an independent registered charity in 2001 and in 2008 changed its name to Stars Foundation for Cerebral Palsy. Cummins was a trustee of the charity which is run entirely by volunteers and raises funds for communication and mobility aids for people with cerebral palsy. In later life, she lived in West London.

On 25 January 2013, Cummins was honoured at the Noir City Film Festival at the Castro Theatre in San Francisco with a screening of a restored print of Gun Crazy.

Cummins died on 29 December 2017, eleven days after her 92nd birthday, at the Chelsea and Westminster Hospital in London, England, following a stroke.

== Filmography ==
Year	Title	Role	Notes
1940	Dr. O'Dowd	Pat O'Dowd	The film is currently missing from the BFI National Archive, and is listed as one of the British Film Institute's "75 Most Wanted" lost films. No sequences of film are known to survive, although the BFI does possess a collection of stills from the production.
1942	Salute John Citizen	Julie Bunting	
1943	Old Mother Riley Detective	Lily	
1944	English Without Tears	Bobbie Heseltine	Released in the United States as Her Man Gilbey
1944	Welcome, Mr. Washington	Sarah Willoughby	Long considered a lost film, it was rediscovered c.2015.
1947	Moss Rose	Belle Adair (Rose Lynton)	
1947	The Late George Apley	Eleanor 'Ellie' Apley	
1948	Escape	Dora Winton	
1948	Green Grass of Wyoming	Carey Greenway	
1949	That Dangerous Age	Monica Brooke	Released in the United States as If This Be Sin
1950	Gun Crazy	Annie Laurie Starr	Preserved by the Library of Congress
1950	My Daughter Joy	Georgette Constantin	
1952	Who Goes There!	Christine Deed	Released in the United States as The Passionate Sentry
1953	Street Corner	Bridget Foster	
1953	Meet Mr Lucifer	Kitty Norton	
1953	Always a Bride	Clare Hemsley	
1954	The Love Lottery	Sally	
1954	To Dorothy a Son	Dorothy Rapallo	
1956	The March Hare	Pat McGuire	
1957	Carry On Admiral	Susan Lashwood	
1957	Hell Drivers	Lucy	
1957	Night of the Demon	Joanna Harrington	
1959	The Captain's Table	Mrs Judd	
1960	Your Money or Your Wife	Gay Butterworth	
1960	Dentist in the Chair	Peggy Travers	
1961	In the Doghouse	Sally Huxley	
