= Witness in the Dark =

- British theatrical poster
- Directed by: Wolf Rilla
- Screenplay by: Leigh Vance; John Lemont
- Based on: an original play by James Parish
- Produced by: Norman Williams
- Starring: Patricia Dainton; Conrad Phillips; Madge Ryan; Nigel Green
- Cinematography: Brendan J. Stafford
- Edited by: Bernard Gribble
- Music by: Philip Green
- Production companies: Alliance Film Distributors Limited (present); Sydney Box Associates (present); Ethiro Productions
- Distributed by: Rank Film Distributors (UK)
- Release date: December 1959 (UK)
- Running time: 62 min
- Country: United Kingdom
- Language: English

Witness in the Dark is a 1959 British second feature crime drama film directed by Wolf Rilla, and starring Patricia Dainton, Conrad Phillips, Madge Ryan and Nigel Green. It was written by Leigh Vance and John Lemont and produced by Norman Williams (Patricia Dainton's husband).

== Plot ==
Jane Pringle, a blind telephone operator, is going to visit her elderly neighbour Mrs Temple when she brushes against a man who tries to sneak past her on the stairs and does not respond when she asks who is there. Jane goes up to Mrs Temple's flat and finds her murdered. The man on the stairs was searching for a valuable brooch that Jane had advised Mrs Temple to find a hiding place for. Later, after Jane has inherited the brooch from Mrs Temple, she finds herself targeted by the intruder.

== Cast ==
- Patricia Dainton as Jane Pringle
- Conrad Phillips as Inspector Coates
- Madge Ryan as Mrs Finch
- Nigel Green as the intruder
- Enid Lorimer as Mrs Temple
- Richard O'Sullivan as Don Theobald
- Stuart Saunders as Mr Finch
- Noel Trevarthen as Sergeant Jones
- Maureen O'Reilly as Sophie Trellan
- Ian Colin as Superintendent Thompson
- Larry Burns as Carter
- Ann Wrigg as woman neighbour
- Frazer Hines as newsboy

== Critical reception ==
The Monthly Film Bulletin wrote: "The incredible stupidity of a murderer who reveals his identity to the audience at the outset, stolid performances and routine characterisation and situations all conspire to rob this second feature of interest and distinction."

According to the Radio Times, "Coming between Bachelor of Hearts and Village of the Damned, this is one of Wolf Rilla's lesser efforts. However, he conjures up a pleasing sense of menace that anticipates Wait until Dark as he subjects blind telephonist Patricia Dainton to the murderous machinations of a prowler. As so often in thrillers of this kind, much depends on contrivance and the script might have concealed its hand with a little more artfulness. But Dainton's performance is superior to that seen in the majority of British Bs."

TV Guide finds the film "standard and predictable," though "Dainton gives a nice performance".

NoirWorthWatching describes the film as "efficiently directed," and concludes that "in many ways [it] is more of a movie than its 62-minute length might suggest. Very much worth watching."
