= Ina De La Haye =

Russian actress and singer (1906–1972)

- Born: 11 October 1906; St. Petersburg, Russia
- Died: 5 December 1972 (aged 65); Ticehurst, East Sussex, England
- Occupation: Actress
- Years active: 1928–1970

Ina De La Haye (1906–1972) was a Russian-born actress and singer known for her performances in Britain on stage, film and television. She was also known as Ina Delahaye.

She was married to Colonel J. V. Delahaye from 1930 to his death in 1955.

== Filmography ==
| Year | Title | Role | Notes |
|---|---|---|---|
| 1928 | Paradise | Douchka | |
| 1949 | Give Us This Day | Dame Katarina | |
| 1951 | Night Without Stars | Mere Roget | |
| 1952 | Top Secret | Madame | |
| 1952 | Moulin Rouge | Middle-Aged Woman | Uncredited |
| 1953 | Top of the Form | Minor Role | Uncredited |
| 1953 | Rob Roy, the Highland Rogue | Countess von Pahlen | |
| 1954 | Dance, Little Lady | Madame Bayanova | |
| 1955 | Bedevilled | Mama Lugacetti | Uncredited |
| 1955 | I Am a Camera | Herr Landauer | |
| 1956 | Anastasia | Marusia | |
| 1956 | The Spanish Gardener | Jose's Mother | |
| 1959 | Charlesworth | Maria | 2 episodes |
| 1959 | A Mask for Alexis | Marguerite Clouzot | 5 episodes |
| 1960 | Our House | Mrs. Louise Iliffe | 11 episodes |
| 1962 | Village of Daughters | Maria Gastoni | |
| 1968 | Isadora | Russian Teacher | |
| 1970 | The Six Wives of Henry VIII | Inez de Venegas | Episode: "Catherine of Aragon" |
| 1970 | The Private Life of Sherlock Holmes | Petrova's Maid | Uncredited, (final film role) |

== Bibliography ==
- Wearing, J.P. The London Stage 1930-1939: A Calendar of Productions, Performers, and Personnel. Rowman & Littlefield, 2014.
