= Always a Bride (1953 film) =

Film by Ralph Smart

- Directed by: Ralph Smart
- Written by: Peter Jones; Ralph Smart
- Produced by: Robert Garrett; George Pitcher; Earl St. John
- Starring: Peggy Cummins; Terence Morgan; Ronald Squire; James Hayter
- Cinematography: James Bawden; C. M. Pennington-Richards
- Edited by: Alfred Roome
- Music by: Benjamin Frankel
- Production company: Clarion Films
- Distributed by: General Film Distributors
- Release date: 12 August 1953
- Running time: 82 minutes
- Country: United Kingdom
- Language: English

Always a Bride is a 1953 British comedy film directed by Ralph Smart and starring Peggy Cummins, Terence Morgan and Ronald Squire. It was written by Peter Jones and Smart.

== Plot ==
A British father and daughter work a confidence trick up and down the luxury hotels of the French Riviera by posing as a newly married couple. Trouble begins, however, when the daughter falls in love with a tax investigator.

== Cast ==
- Peggy Cummins as Clare Hemsley
- Terence Morgan as Terence Winch
- Ronald Squire as Victor Hemsley
- James Hayter as Dutton
- Marie Lohr as dowager
- Geoffrey Sumner as Teddy
- David Hurst as Beckstein
- Sebastian Cabot as taxi driver
- Charles Goldner as hotel manager
- Jacques B. Brunius as Inspector
- Jill Day as singer
- Jacques Brown as manager
- Dino Galvani as magistrate
- Mary Hinton as dowager
- Eliot Makeham as Roger, hotel guest
- Martin Benson as hotel desk clerk
- Robert Rietti as Inspector

== Production ==
The film's sets were designed by Maurice Carter.

== Reception ==
The Monthly Film Bulletin wrote: "Ralph Smart succeeds in giving this story, with its many unoriginal elements, a certain gloss of humour and telling characterisation. But the dialogue is not, in spite of topicalities about the Dockers and Farouk, sufficiently biting and for a comedy of situation the film is too loosely constructed. Terence Moro gives a pleasant performance, though it is to be doubted if such clean-hearted ingenuousness would ever detect a currency fraud. As the crooks, Ronald Squire and Marie Lohr are well cast, and their ripe, well-bred knavery shows up Peggy Cummins as a sleek but savourless White Sheep of the syndicate. Pleasant entertainment, but quickly forgotten afterwards."

Kine Weekly wrote: "Neither the story nor the dialogue is particularly snappy, but all the same, the principal players and the director succeed in giving the elegant, if slightly stagey, set-up agreeable veneer."

Variety wrote: "Neatly contrived and unpretentious little comedy that should make a good second feature in picture houses in some countries. ... Slow at the start, pic builds to an amusing climax in typical French farce fashion. A group of seasoned players gives an air of credulity to a preposterous situation."

In British Sound Films: The Studio Years 1928–1959 David Quinlan rated the film as "good", writing: "Silly comedy comes off, thanks to polished production, amusing characterization, neat script."
