= The March Hare (1956 film) =

1956 British comedy film

- Directed by: George More O'Ferrall
- Written by: Gordon Wellesley; Allan MacKinnon; Paul Vincent Carroll (additional dialogue)
- Based on: the novel Gamblers Sometimes Win by T.H. Bird
- Produced by: Albert Fennell; Bertram Ostrer
- Cinematography: Jack Hildyard
- Edited by: Gordon Pilkington
- Music by: Philip Green
- Production companies: B & A Productions (as Achilles)
- Distributed by: British Lion Film Corporation (UK)
- Release date: April 1956 (UK)
- Running time: 85 minutes
- Country: United Kingdom
- Language: English

The March Hare is a 1956 British comedy film directed by George More O'Ferrall and starring Peggy Cummins, Terence Morgan, Martita Hunt and Cyril Cusack. The film follows the efforts in Ireland to turn a seemingly useless racing horse, called "The March Hare", into a Derby-winner.

== Plot ==
The film begins at Royal Ascot. Sir Charles Hare is an Irish baronet who loses his ancestral home and its racing stables after someone fixes a race that Hare has gambled on. Forced to sell his estate, he decides to stay on when the new American owner's attractive daughter Pat mistakes him for a groom. Playing along with her mistake, romance develops between the two.

Meanwhile, Hare's aunt Lady Anneand his friend Col Keene, save one colt from the sale, and rear it with the help of Mangan, who is invariably drunk but has strong control over the horse by invoking the power of the fairies. Hare names the colt "The March Hare".

We jump two years to a racecourse where Peggy discovers Sir Charles's true identity and "The March Hare" only manages to race after Mangan calms the horse using fairy words. Hare and Pat go for a date in London. After Mangan falls ill, he becomes teetotal, which restores his health but means he can no longer remember the fairy words.

Derby Day arrives and Hare needs to track down Mangan. Lady Anne has got him drunk in the pub in the hope that it will restore his memory of the fairy words. They get him to the track in time to whisper his magic words to the horse. As the race starts March Hare lags behind: it appears that someone has sabotaged the race again, but March Hare forges forward and wins.

Sir Charles is rich again and Pat is happy to marry him.

== Cast ==
- Peggy Cummins as Pat McGuire
- Terence Morgan as Sir Charles Hare
- Martita Hunt as Lady Anne
- Cyril Cusack as Lazy Mangan
- Wilfrid Hyde-White as Colonel Keene
- Derrick De Marney as Captain Marlow
- Charles Hawtrey as Fisher
- Maureen Delany as Bridget
- Ivan Samson as Hardwicke
- MacDonald Parke as Maguire
- Peter Swanwick as Nils Svenson
- Charles Wade as Tim Doughty
- Reginald Beckwith as insurance broker
- Stringer Davis as doctor
- Raymond Glendenning as himself

== Critical reception ==
In the Radio Times, Tony Sloman gave the film three out of five stars, and wrote, "Best remembered (if at all) for Philip Green's jaunty theme music, this British Lion horse-racing romp gains from the fact that it was photographed in colour and CinemaScope by the great Jack Hildyard. It also has good-looking leads in handsome Terence Morgan and sultry Peggy Cummins who, together with a sly performance from Cyril Cusack, keep the whole thing a good deal more watchable than it deserves to be. Comedy fans might care to note the pre-Carry On casting of Charles Hawtrey, while Wilfrid Hyde White also puts in an appearance."

In British Sound Films: The Studio Years 1928–1959 David Quinlan rated the film as "average", writing: "Curdled whimsey kept afloat by Cusack's sly playing. Philip Green's theme music was a big hit."

== See also ==
- List of films about horses
- List of films about horse racing
