= And Women Shall Weep =

1960 British film by John Lemont

- Original British quad poster
- Directed by: John Lemont
- Screenplay by: John Lemont; Leigh Vance
- Produced by: Norman Williams
- Starring: Ruth Dunning; Max Butterfield; Gillian Vaughan; Richard O'Sullivan
- Cinematography: Brendan J. Stafford
- Edited by: Bernard Gribble
- Music by: Philip Green
- Production companies: Alliance Film Studios Limited; Ethiro Productions
- Distributed by: J. Arthur Rank Film Distributors (UK)
- Release date: 17 April 1960 (UK)
- Running time: 65 minutes
- Country: United Kingdom
- Language: English

And Women Shall Weep is a 1960 British drama film directed by John Lemont and starring Ruth Dunning, Max Butterfield and Richard O'Sullivan. It was written by Lemont and Leigh Vance. A mother tries to prevent her younger son being led astray by his delinquent elder brother.

The title is taken from Charles Kingsley's 1851 poem, Three Fishers.

== Cast ==
- Ruth Dunning as Mrs Lumsden
- Max Butterfield as Terry Lumsden
- Richard O'Sullivan as Godfrey Lumsden
- Gillian Vaughan as Brenda Wilkes
- Claire Gordon as Sadie MacDougall
- David Gregory as Desmond Peel
- David Rose as Woody Forrest
- León García as Ossie Green
- Prudence Bury as Jenny Owens

== Critical reception ==
The Monthly Film Bulletin wrote: "This frantic domestic melodrama fails both in its strictures on teenagers and as an orgy of mother-love emotionalism. Its thrills are only too patently geared towards sensationalism, while the character of the mother is overdrawn, overplayed and as in her unnecessary burst of violence at the end as anything but sympathetic."

Kine Weekly wrote: "Taut domestic melodrama, with lttle-tough-guy overtones. ... Ruth Dunning does a first-class job as Mrs. Lumsden, Max Butterfield is every inch the rat as Terry, Richard O'Sullivan acts naturally as false hero-worshipper Godfrey, and Gillian Vaughan tantalises as Brenda, the female of the hoodlum species. Its finale is moving and showmanlike, and the low life backgrounds are suitably varied."

The Radio Times Guide to Films gave the film 2/5 stars, writing: "This little British B-movie is given great strength by the leading performance of veteran TV character actress Ruth Dunning. She stars as a widow trying to keep her young son Richard O'Sullivan on the straight and narrow. However, her older son Max Butterfield is beyond help. Slight and overplayed."
