= Pierre La Mure =

French author

Pierre La Mure (15 June 1909 – 28 December 1976) was a French author.

La Mure was born in Nice, in department Alpes-Maritimes. He published the 1950 novel Moulin Rouge about the life of the French artist Henri de Toulouse-Lautrec. This book was the basis of the classic 1952 movie of the same name. He later penned the play Monsieur Toulouse; a work centered on Henri de Toulouse-Lautrec's relationship to Marie Charlet, a prostitute, and his meeting with fellow artist Vincent van Gogh. The play was premiered by the Worthing Theatre Company at the Connaught Theatre in October 1957 with Ian Holm as Toulouse-Lautrec, Gene Anderson as Marie Charlet, Elizabeth Spriggs as Madame Loubet, Angela Browne as Leontine, Ivan Stafford as Ernest, and Roland Curram as Van Gogh.

La Mure also produced the book Beyond Desire about the life of Cécile and Felix Mendelssohn and the biographical novel Claire de Lune on the life and struggles of French composer Claude Debussy, published in 1962. He died in California in the United States, aged 67.

== Bibliography ==
- Le Roi de la Nuit. John D. Rockefeller (1937)
- Gongs in the Night, Reaching the Tribes of French Indo-China (1943)
- Moulin Rouge, a novel based on the life of Henri de Toulouse-Lautrec (American edition 1950)
- Beyond Desire, a novel based on the life of Felix and Cécile Mendelssohn (1955), ISBN 0-87140-206-8 (unrelated to the film of the same name)
- Clair de lune, a novel about Claude Debussy (1962)
- The private life of Mona Lisa (1975), ISBN 0-316-51300-8
