= That Dangerous Age =

1949 film by Gregory Ratoff

- United States Theatrical release poster
- Directed by: Gregory Ratoff
- Written by: Gene Markey
- Based on: a story by Ben Simcoe based on the play Autumn by Margaret Kennedy and Ilya Surguchev
- Produced by: Gregory Ratoff
- Starring: Myrna Loy; Peggy Cummins; Richard Greene; Roger Livesey
- Cinematography: Georges Périnal; Anchise Brizzi (Italian sequences)
- Edited by: Gerald Turney-Smith
- Music by: Mischa Spoliansky
- Production company: London Film Productions
- Distributed by: British Lion Films
- Release date: 5 September 1949
- Running time: 98 minutes
- Country: United Kingdom
- Language: English
- Box office: £176,577 (UK)

That Dangerous Age (U.S. title: If This Be Sin) is a 1949 British romance film directed by Gregory Ratoff and starring Myrna Loy, Roger Livesey and Peggy Cummins. It was written by Gene Markey based on a story by Ben Simcoe, adapted from the 1937 play Autumn by Margaret Kennedy and Ilya Surguchev.

== Plot ==
Sir Brian Brooke, a famous attorney, collapses while acting as defense counsel in a high-profile murder trial. Doctor Thorvald informs his (second) wife Cathy that Brian needs to rest for six months or he will die; Brian is also temporarily blind. They and Brian's daughter Monica relax in Italy.

They receive an anonymous letter accusing Cathy of carrying on an affair with Brian's junior partner, Michael Barcleigh. Brian's lawyer instincts makes him believe it, until Cathy reveals that Michael has confided to her that he is in love with Monica. Brian is apologetic, and delighted by the news. However, Cathy has lied, and the letter is correct.

== Cast ==
- Myrna Loy as Lady Cathy Brooke
- Peggy Cummins as Monica Brooke
- Richard Greene as Michael Barcleigh
- Roger Livesey as Sir Brian Brooke
- Elizabeth Allan as Lady Sybil
- Gerard Heinz as Doctor Thorvald
- Jean Cadell as Nannie
- G. H. Mulcaster as Simmons
- Margaret Withers as May Drummond
- Ronald Adam as Prosecutor
- Wilfrid Hyde-White as Mr Potts
- Henry Caine as Mr Nyburg
- Patrick Waddington as Rosley
- Edith Sharpe as Angela Caine
- George Curzon as Selby
- Robert Atkins as George Drummond
- Phyllis Stanley as Jane
- Daphne Arthur as Margot
- Martin Case as John
- Barry Jones as Arnold Cane
- Louise Lord as Ellen
- Nicholas Bruce as Charles
- William Mervyn as Nicky
- André Morell as Doctor McCatcheon

== Production ==
It was shot at Shepperton Studios and on location in London and Capri. The film's sets were designed by the art director Andrej Andrejew.

== Reception ==
The Monthly Film Bulletin wrote: "This is certainly engrossing entertainment, and although the action is slow at first it gathers momentum as the film progresses to a dramatic climax. The production and direction are good, and so is the photography. Roger Livesey is superb as a K.C., and most convincing as the irascible invalid. Myrna Loy is quite at home as the patient and devoted wife and stepmother, while Peggy Cummins and Richard Green portray the younger generation with perfect ease; Peggy Cummins, especially, is to be commended on her appeal in the dramatic scenes. All the remaining members of the cast give most worthy support."

Kine Weekly wrote: "The picture is very stage play and the sophisticated atmosphere and backgrounds accentuate rather than cloak its stock characters and situations. Myrna Loy is always easy on the eyes, but, delightful as she is, it is beyond her power to put much genuine emotional feeling into the 'storm in a teacup.'"

Variety wrote: "A big cast and opulent staging are the two major assets of this new British production and will play a prominent part in determining the appeal of this film. Plot is handicapped by uncertain treatment and the emotional theme is not developed until the final stages. ... In a hesitant opening, the story creates an air of indecision, and although the central situation is readily established it is done without feeling and warmth. It isn't until the climax, which is staged with due dramatic emphasis, that the theme gets warmed up to tear-jerking finish."

== Comic book adaptation ==
- Eastern Color Movie Love #2 (April 1950)
