= Scrooge (1951 film) =

1951 film by Brian Desmond Hurst

- UK quad poster
- Directed by: Brian Desmond Hurst
- Screenplay by: Noel Langley
- Based on: A Christmas Carol by Charles Dickens
- Produced by: Brian Desmond Hurst; Stanley Haynes
- Starring: Alastair Sim; Mervyn Johns; Hermione Baddeley; Jack Warner; Kathleen Harrison; Michael Hordern; George Cole
- Narrated by: Peter Bull
- Cinematography: C. M. Pennington-Richards
- Edited by: Clive Donner
- Music by: Richard Addinsell
- Production company: George Minter Productions
- Distributed by: Renown Pictures
- Release dates: 22 November 1951 (Odeon Marble Arch); 28 November 1951 (New York)
- Running time: 87 minutes
- Country: United Kingdom
- Language: English

Scrooge (released as A Christmas Carol in the United States) is a 1951 British Christmas fantasy drama film based on the 1843 novella A Christmas Carol by Charles Dickens. It stars Alastair Sim as Ebenezer Scrooge, and was produced and directed by Brian Desmond Hurst, with a screenplay by Noel Langley. It also features Michael Hordern, Kathleen Harrison, George Cole, Hermione Baddeley, Mervyn Johns, Clifford Mollison, Jack Warner, Ernest Thesiger, and Patrick Macnee. Peter Bull narrates portions of Charles Dickens's words at the beginning and end of the film, and appears on-screen as a businessman.

Upon its initial release, the movie was largely ignored by critics, and reactions were varied. Nevertheless, the movie attracted a cult following on television, and subsequent reviews have been significantly more positive, with many critics considering it one of the best adaptions of the novel, with general praise for the performances, particularly Sim's portrayal of Scrooge.

== Plot ==
On Christmas Eve, Ebenezer Scrooge tells his colleagues that he has no intention of celebrating Christmas. He refuses to donate to two men collecting for the poor. His nephew, Fred, invites him to dinner the next day, but Scrooge refuses, disparaging Fred for having married and mocking him for his lack of success. He gives his mistreated clerk, Bob Cratchit, the day off for Christmas but demands that he come to work early the next day.

Scrooge returns home and is visited by the ghost of his late partner, Jacob Marley. Marley's ghost warns Scrooge that he must change his ways or be condemned to wander the earth in agony for the selfish deeds he committed in life. Marley says Scrooge will be visited by three spirits, the first to arrive at one o'clock that night. Frightened, Scrooge takes refuge in his bed.

The Ghost of Christmas Past arrives. Scrooge is shown himself alone at school, unwanted by his father after his mother died in childbirth. His beloved sister Fan arrives to take him home, telling Ebenezer that their father has had a change of heart toward him. The Spirit then shows Scrooge the annual Christmas party thrown by his former benevolent employer, S. Fezziwig. Scrooge watches his younger self propose to his sweetheart Alice, who accepts. He is then shown how he is tempted to leave Fezziwig's to join a business run by Mr. Jorkin.

Scrooge witnesses the death of Fan after she gives birth to Fred and discovers he missed her last words asking him to look after her son. Scrooge's younger self joins Jorkin and meets Jacob Marley. Jorkin's firm buys Fezziwig's business, and Alice breaks her engagement to Scrooge because of his dedication to "a golden idol". When Jorkin is found to have embezzled funds from the now bankrupt company, Scrooge and Marley seize the opportunity to buy his shares. One Christmas Eve seven years earlier, Scrooge refuses to see Marley until the workday is finished and arrives just as his friend dies cold and alone. The Spirit reproaches Scrooge for taking Marley's money and house, as an ashamed Scrooge finds himself back in his bed.

Scrooge is then visited by the Ghost of Christmas Present who takes him to see how "men of goodwill" celebrate Christmas. The spirit shows Scrooge poor miners joyfully singing Christmas carols and the Cratchits' celebration on Christmas Day. Scrooge asks whether their ailing young son, Tiny Tim, will survive his physical disabilities. The Spirit hints that he will not unless the future is changed but questions why Scrooge should care for the "surplus population". Scrooge and the spirit then visit Fred's Christmas party, where Fred defends Scrooge from his guests' critical remarks.

An older Alice is working in a poorhouse, where she ministers to the sick and homeless. The Spirit shows Scrooge two emaciated children, personifying Ignorance and Want. When Scrooge shows concern for their welfare, the Spirit scourges the miser with his own words: "Are there no prisons? Are there no workhouses?"

Finally, Scrooge encounters the Ghost of Christmas Yet to Come, who shows him the Cratchits mourning Tiny Tim's death. Three people, including Scrooge's charwoman, Mrs. Dilber, sell off the possessions of a dead man, and two businessmen joke they will only attend the man's funeral if lunch is provided. When shown a gravestone bearing his own name, Scrooge begs the Spirit for a second chance; he then awakens in his bed.

Scrooge learns that it is Christmas Day and gleefully realises he still has an opportunity to make amends. Though Mrs. Dilber is initially frightened by his transformation, Scrooge reassures her and gives her the day off with pay. He anonymously purchases a prize turkey for the Cratchits and sends it to them. He delights Fred by attending his dinner party, asking his niece-in-law's forgiveness and dancing with her. The next day, Scrooge plays a prank on Bob Cratchit and pretends to be about to fire him for lateness, but instead says he will raise Bob's salary and assist his family. Scrooge embodies the Christmas spirit and becomes a second father to Tiny Tim, who recovers.

== Cast ==
- Alastair Sim as Ebenezer Scrooge
  - George Cole as Young Ebenezer Scrooge
- Kathleen Harrison as Mrs. Dilber, charwoman
- Mervyn Johns as Bob Cratchit
- Hermione Baddeley as Mrs. Cratchit
- Michael Hordern as Jacob Marley
  - Patrick Macnee as Young Jacob Marley
- Glyn Dearman as Tiny Tim
- John Charlesworth as Peter Cratchit
- Michael J. Dolan as the Ghost of Christmas Past
- Francis de Wolff as the Ghost of Christmas Present
- Czesław Konarski as the Ghost of Christmas Yet to Come
- Rona Anderson as Alice, Scrooge's past fiancée
- Carol Marsh as Fan "Fanny" Scrooge
- Jack Warner as Mr. Jorkin, Scrooge's second employer
- Roddy Hughes as Mr. S. Fezziwig, Scrooge's first employer
- Brian Worth as Fred, Scrooge's nephew
- Olga Edwardes as Fred's wife
- Miles Malleson as Old Joe
- Ernest Thesiger as Mr. Stretch (the undertaker)
- Louise Hampton as the laundress
- Peter Bull as first businessman at exchange (also voice of narrator)
- Douglas Muir as second businessman at exchange
- Noel Howlett as first collector for people in need
- Fred Johnson as second collector for people in need
- Eliot Makeham as Mr. Snedrig
- Henry Hewitt as Mr. Rosebed
- Hugh Dempster as Mr. Groper
- Eleanor Summerfield as Miss Flora, Fred's party guest
- Richard Pearson as Mr. Tupper, Fred's party guest
- Clifford Mollison as Samuel Wilkins, Scrooge's poor client
- Hattie Jacques as Mrs. Fezziwig
- Teresa Derrington as Fred's maid
- David Hannaford as boy buying prize turkey
- Catherine Leach as Belinda Cratchit
- Moiya Kelly as Martha Cratchit
- Luanne Kemp as Mary Cratchit
- Maire O'Neill as older Alice's patient at the Charity Hospital
- Anthony Wager as Mr. Fezziwig's lad
- Derek Stephens as a dancer at Fezziwig's
- Vi Kaley as old lady sitting by stove at the Charity Hospital

== Production ==
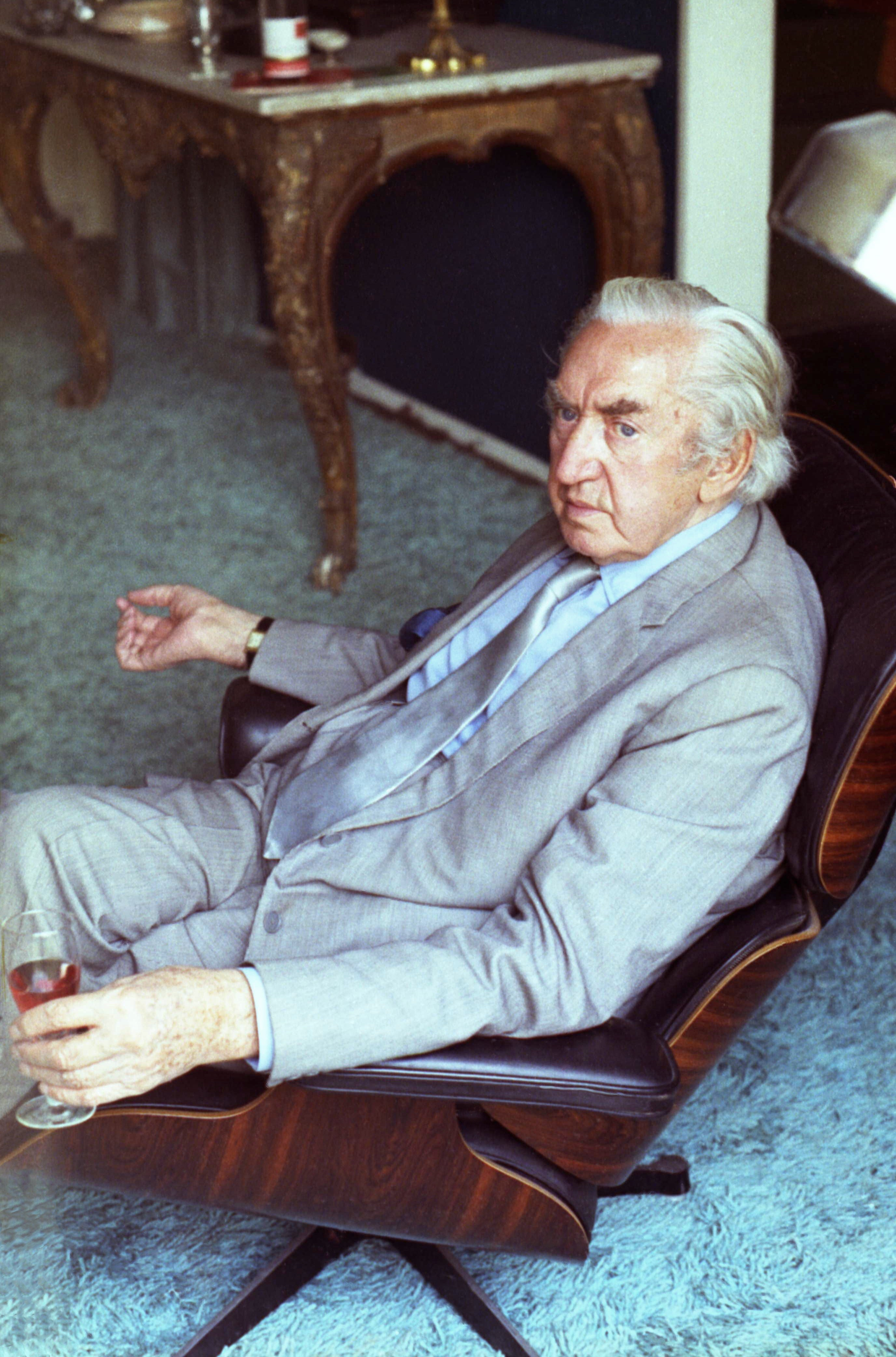
Brian Desmond Hurst

Alastair Sim was Hurst's first choice to play Scrooge. Teresa Derrington, who played Fred's maid who gives Scrooge quiet encouragement to see Fred, said Sim was not as encouraging to her during filming, and asked her sneeringly if it was her first film role.

=== Comparison with the source material ===
In the film, Mrs. Dilber is the name of the charwoman, whereas in the book the woman was unnamed and the laundress was named Mrs. Dilber. Dilber’s role is greatly expanded in the film, to the point that her actress receives second billing in the list of cast. The interactions of the two charity benefactors, Scrooge's nephew, and his clerk Bob Cratchit in the office are not in the same order as in the book.

Samuel Wilkins, who is in debt to Scrooge, was not in the book. The film also expands on the story by detailing Scrooge's rise as a prominent businessman. He was corrupted by an avaricious new mentor, Mr. Jorkin (played by Jack Warner), a character created for the film, who lured him away from the benevolent Mr. Fezziwig and also introduced him to Jacob Marley. When Jorkin is discovered to be an embezzler, the opportunistic Scrooge and Jacob Marley offer to compensate the company's losses on the condition that they receive control of the company for which they work – and so, Scrooge and Marley is born.

The character of Scrooge's fiancée, named Belle in the book and shown at the end of the Ghost of Christmas Past chapter to have become a happily-married mother, is renamed Alice and is given an extra scene during the Ghost of Christmas Present sequence, where she is not married and working at a shelter, tending to the needs of the poor.

The film rewrites the source material by explaining that Ebenezer's mother died giving birth to him, causing his father to resent him. In the book, Fan is much younger than Ebenezer, and the cause of her death is not mentioned. In the film, Ebenezer is younger than Fan, who dies after giving birth to his nephew Fred, thus engendering Scrooge's estrangement from him, and causing Ebenezer to resent his nephew as his father did before him.

=== Music ===
Richard Addinsell wrote several pieces for the film's underscore, ranging from dark and moody to light and joyous. One of the more notable tunes is a polka, used in the two different versions of Fred's dinner party: the one Scrooge observes while with the Ghost of Christmas Present, and the other with Scrooge attending the party after atoning for his past coldness to Fred and his wife. The tune is similar to a traditional Slovenian polka called "Stoparjeva" ("hitch-hiker") or just "Stopar".

The film also contains excerpts from some traditional Christmas carols and other tunes. "Hark! The Herald Angels Sing" is sung over part of the opening credits, and by the miners when Scrooge is with the Ghost of Christmas Present. An instrumental version of "I Saw Three Ships" is played when Scrooge gives a coin to Mrs. Dilber, and again just before the end of the film. "Silent Night" is played and sung at various times, including over the last part of the final scene and "The End".

The English country dance "Sir Roger de Coverley" is played and danced during the scene where Scrooge visits the office of Old Fezziwig with The Ghost of Christmas Past.

The tragic folk song "Barbara Allen" is played as an instrumental when young Scrooge is talking with his sister Fan, and sung as a duet at Fred's Christmas party. Scrooge turns up in the middle of the line "Young man, I think you're dying", thereby causing the singers to stop before the last two words.

== Release ==
The film was released in Great Britain under its original title, Scrooge. United Artists handled the U.S. release under the title A Christmas Carol. The film was originally slated to be shown at New York City's Radio City Music Hall as part of their Christmas attraction, but the theatre management decided that the film was too grim and did not possess enough family entertainment value to warrant an engagement at the Music Hall. Instead, the film premiered at the Guild 50th Theatre, near the Music Hall, on 28 November 1951.

=== Home media ===
The film was released on Blu-ray in 2009 by VCI, in a package that also included a DVD copy of the film, cropped into a faux widescreen format. This package only contained minimal bonus features. It was issued again on Blu-ray in 2011 with a remastered transfer, and many bonus features that did not appear in the first Blu-ray edition.

== Reception ==
=== Box-office ===
The film was one of the most popular in Britain in 1952, but was a box office disappointment in the United States.

However, the film became a holiday favourite on American television where it was broadcast regularly during the 1950s and 1960s.

=== Critical reception ===
Bosley Crowther of The New York Times posted a favourable notice, writing that producer Brian Desmond Hurst "has not only hewed to the line of Dickens' classic fable of a spiritual regeneration on Christmas Eve, but he has got some arresting recreations of the story's familiar characters...The visions of Scrooge's life story are glimpses into depressing realms, and the aspects of poverty and ignorance in nineteenth-century England are made plain. To the credit of Mr. Hurst's production, not to its disfavor, let it be said that it does not conceal Dickens' intimations of human meanness with an artificial gloss." Crowther concluded, "...what we have in this rendition of Dickens' sometimes misunderstood "Carol" is an accurate comprehension of the agony of a shabby soul. And this is presented not only in the tortured aspects of Mr. Sim but in the phantasmagoric creation of a somber and chilly atmosphere. These, set against the exhibition of conventional manifests of love and cheer, do right by the moral of Dickens and round a trenchant and inspiring Christmas show." Richard L. Coe of The Washington Post was also positive: "This may not be A Christmas Carol of recent tradition, but I've an idea it's the way Dickens would have wanted it. It's the way he wrote it." Harrison's Reports called the film "delightful entertainment", finding that "though it does have its somber moments, it ends on so cheerful a note that one cannot help but leave the theatre in a happy mood." John McCarten of The New Yorker was also mostly positive, writing that "there's enough good here to warrant the attendance of all save the hardest of heart."

Variety, however, called the film "a grim thing that will give tender-aged kiddies viewing it the screaming-meemies, and adults will find it long, dull and greatly overdone." It also called Sim's performance "a tank-town Hamlet." Time magazine ran a mixed review, criticising the direction while praising the performances. In Britain, The Monthly Film Bulletin was also mixed, finding that the film "as a whole lacks style" and that Sim resembled more a "dour dyspeptic" than a miser, but nevertheless concluded that "the film may please in its good-natured reminder of Christmas joys, and much praise is due to Kathleen Harrison for her inimitable playing of the true Cockney."

The film gained popularity on TV. Hurst was immensely proud of the film and that it was shown on TV. Patrick Macnee, who played the young Marley, cited the film as his favourite version of the story, stating that it "really seems to capture the true essence of the Dickens novel". In a 2016 review, Donald Clarke called the film "the best ever committed to film (of the book)", praising the cast's performances. In 1999, Empire film critic Monika Maurer gave the film four out of five stars, feeling that while "some of the other performances have dated, Sim's haunted Scrooge stands the test of time, even today eliciting sympathy and - you just can't help yourself - joy at his transformation", and concluded, "Lashings of festive cheer and a fair dollop of fine performances will leave you in the mood for mince pies and a renewed sense of seasonal goodwill to all men." Sim's performance still receives praise, with some calling his version of the character the "definitive" Scrooge. Michael Brooke's review is not without criticism, finding the various ghosts to be "distinctly unfrightening", and the Cratchit family "too healthy to be convincingly on the brink of starvation, especially a ruddy-cheeked Tiny Tim who seems barely inconvenienced by his crutches". In 2019, Robert Keeling of Den of Geek praised Sim as Scrooge. He said the film captures "the darkness of the story", but that the film "plays pretty fast and loose with the source material in parts", noting that the death of Fan has become an artistic error in other adaptations, but ultimately concluding that the film was "fully deserving of its place as a Christmas classic."

Aggregate site Rotten Tomatoes gave the film a 91% "Fresh" rating based on 33 reviews, with the consensus reading "The 1951 adaptation of Charles Dickens' timeless classic is perhaps the most faithful film version -- and Alastair Sim's performance as Scrooge is not to be missed."

== See also ==
- List of Christmas films
- List of ghost films
- List of A Christmas Carol adaptations
