= Motel (TV series) =

- Genre: Soap opera Serial
- Created by: James Workman
- Written by: Creswick Jenkinson; Richard Lane; James Workman; Eleanor White
- Starring: Tony Bazell; Jill Forster; Noel Trevarthen; Enid Lorimer
- Country of origin: Australia
- Original language: English
- No. of episodes: 135

Production
- Running time: 30 minutes (4 times weekly)

Original release
- Network: ATN-7
- Release: 27 May 1968 – 1969

Related
- The Story of Peter Grey; Similar elements to British serial Crossroads

Motel is an Australian television soap opera produced by the Seven Network's ATN-7 studios from 1968 to 1969.

Motel, like British serial Crossroads dealt with a family who ran a motel. In this case the Gillian family running the fictional Green Fields Motel.

== Selected cast ==
- Tony Bazell - Mark Jefferies
- Jack Thompson - Bill Burke
- Jill Forster- Gaye Gillian
- Enid Lorimer - Bunty Creighton
- Brian James - Paul Drennan
- Ross Higgins - Reverend Larcombe
- Gregory Ross - Chris Gillian
- Noel Trevarthen - Rod Gillian

== Production ==
The series had a cast of thirteen regulars and required three days in the studio each week. Each episode was thirty minutes and the program screened at midday four days a week, with the episode repeated late at night. The show was shot in black-and-white. It had a run of 135 episodes. Writers included Creswick Jenkinson.

== Reception ==
According to Richard Lane, who worked on the series as a writer, the series was very successful as a day time program, which was how it was conceived. But when Channel Seven management "became over enthusiastic and repeated it at nighttime it was a disaster."
