= In the Doghouse (film) =

1961 British film by Darcy Conyers

- British quad poster by Tom Chantrell
- Directed by: Darcy Conyers
- Written by: Michael Pertwee
- Based on: It's a Vet's Life by Alex Duncan
- Produced by: Earl St. John
- Starring: Leslie Phillips; Peggy Cummins; Hattie Jacques; James Booth
- Cinematography: Alan Hume
- Edited by: Roger Cherrill
- Music by: Philip Green
- Production company: Rank Films
- Release date: December 17, 1961
- Running time: 91 minutes
- Country: United Kingdom
- Language: English

In the Doghouse, also known as Vet in the Doghouse, is a 1961 British black-and-white comedy film directed by Darcy Conyers and starring Leslie Phillips and Peggy Cummins. It was written by Michael Pertwee based on the 1961 novel It's a Vet's Life by Alex Duncan.

The title refers to the British expression of a person being "in the doghouse" when a person is ostracised usually relating to a husband for domestic bad behaviour, and usually used in the third person e.g. "he is in the doghouse because... "

== Plot ==
Jimmy Fox-Upton is an accident prone and less than brilliant veterinary student in his final year of college having already failed his finals 4 times. He unexpectedly passes and his good heart outweighs any academic shortcomings. He takes over an old practice, keeping a chimpanzee in the surgery, and becomes rivals with fellow student Skeffington who opens a swanky practice around the corner. They try to sabotage the shipment of horses overseas, but end up tied in the back of a lorry with the horses. Jimmy's chimpanzee unties them. After their escapades get in the newspapers, Jimmy is called to Buckingham Palace to treat the corgis.

== Cast ==
- Leslie Phillips as Jimmy Fox-Upton
- Peggy Cummins as Sally Huxley
- Hattie Jacques as Josephine Gudgeon
- James Booth as Bob Skeffington
- Dick Bentley as Mr. Peddle
- Colin Gordon as Dean
- Joan Heal as Mrs. Peddle
- Esma Cannon as Mrs. Raikes
- Fenella Fielding as Miss Fordyce
- Richard Goolden as Mr. Ribart
- Joan Hickson as Miss Gibbs
- Vida Hope as Mrs. Crabtree
- Jacqueline Jones as Rita
- Peggy Thorpe-Bates as Mrs. Muswell
- Harry Locke as Sid West
- Patsy Rowlands as barmaid
- Kynaston Reeves as Colonel
- Joan Young as middle-aged woman
- Judith Furse as massage woman
- Lance Percival as policeman (uncredited)
- George A. Cooper as examiner

== Release ==
The film had its premiere at the Odeon Cinema in Barking, London on 17 December 1961.

== Critical reception ==
The Monthly Film Bulletin wrote: "Not content with gaining easy laughs by its parade of routine animal jokes, centred round an amiable booby of a vet, this wobbly farce makes a pitch for tears too by dragging in a whimsical toddler and a dear old lady with a dying spaniel. Its story gives the impression of being slapped together for shooting, then severely cut for distribution. But one role that deserves expansion is that given to Fenella Fielding who appears only briefly, exchanging glad-eyes with a lion and outsexing the blonde vamps who undulate through the poodles' beauty parlour run by a villainous vet. This character is played by James Booth in a horsewhip-and-brimstone style of comedy more suited to melodrama or the Demon King in pantomime."

The Radio Times wrote "...makes a fine comic vehicle for Leslie Phillips, who has to resort to his trademark charm to atone for his misadventures as he begins life as a qualified vet (after spending years trying to pass his final exams. However, he also gets to reveal an unexpected action-man side as he thwarts a horse-smuggling ring. ... Despite booming support from Hattie Jacques, this patchy film is perhaps most significant for bringing down the curtain on the career of Peggy Cummins, who made her first film in 1940 at the age of 15."

Leslie Halliwell said: "Easy-going farce with animal interest and a great many familiar faces."
