= Street Corner (1953 film) =

1953 film by Muriel Box

- Directed by: Muriel Box
- Written by: Muriel Box; Sydney Box
- Produced by: Sydney Box; William MacQuitty
- Starring: Peggy Cummins; Terence Morgan; Anne Crawford; Rosamund John; Barbara Murray
- Cinematography: Reginald Wyer
- Edited by: Jean Barker
- Music by: Temple Abady
- Production company: London Independent Producers
- Distributed by: General Film Distributors
- Release date: 17 March 1953
- Running time: 94 minutes
- Country: United Kingdom
- Language: English
- Box office: £49,000 (by 1953)

Street Corner (U.S. title Both Sides of the Law; also known as Gentle Arm and The Policewoman) is a 1953 British drama film directed by Muriel Box and starring Peggy Cummins, Terence Morgan, Anne Crawford, Rosamund John and Barbara Murray. It was written by Muriel Box and Sydney Box. While it is not quite a documentary, the film depicts the daily routine of women in the police force from three different angles. It was conceived as a female version of the 1950 film The Blue Lamp.

== Plot ==
The three plotlines concern a female army deserter guilty of bigamy; a toddler neglected and beaten by its stepmother; and an 18-year-old married mother who is caught shoplifting and gets involved with a jewel thief. The film climaxes in a police dog's attack on a criminal.

== Cast ==
- Peggy Cummins as Bridget Foster
- Terence Morgan as Ray
- Anne Crawford as Susan
- Rosamund John as Sergeant Pauline Ramsey
- Barbara Murray as WPC Lucy
- Sarah Lawson as Joyce
- Ronald Howard as David Evans
- Eleanor Summerfield as Edna Hurran
- Michael Medwin as Chick Farrar
- Charles Victor as Muller
- Anthony Oliver as Stanley Foster
- Harold Lang as Len
- Dora Bryan as prostitute
- Eunice Gayson as Janet
- Michael Hordern as Detective Inspector Heron
- Maurice Denham as Mr Dawson
- Yvonne Marsh as Elsa
- Isabel George as Helen
- Nelly Arno as woman customer
- Dandy Nichols as Mrs Furness, neighbour (uncredited)
- Ronnie Corbett as Henry M (surname unclear)(uncredited)

== Production ==
It was shot at Pinewood Studios and on location around London with sets were designed by the art director Cedric Dawe.

== Critical reception ==
The Monthly Film Bulletin wrote: "Keeping firmly to the Blue Lamp formula, the film has the standard ingredients of its type: crooks operating from a shady and improbable night club; cameo parts (Joyce Carey, Dora Bryan, etc.); cups of tea in the police canteen; and a final chase across a bomb site. In spite of much location work around London, the whole thing appears highly synthetic. Direction and script are stereotyped, and the policewomen, led by Rosamund John, seem to have the makings of a good hockey team."

Kine Weekly wrote: "It illustrates pages from the notebooks of the Women's Constabulary, and the reports, brought vividly to life by good acting and shrewd direction, smoothly interlock. The slick overall, reinforced by authentic atmosphere, and smart dialogue make up-to-the-minute, moving and exciting melodrama."

In British Sound Films: The Studio Years 1928–1959 David Quinlan rated the film as "average", writing: "Documentary-style thriller with upper-class lady coppers. Good final chase, otherwise unreal."

Leslie Halliwell said: "Patter-plotted female Blue Lamp; just about watchable."

Variety wrote: "Putting the spotlight on the women's police force, this yarn encompasses a wealth of human incident which makes absorbing entainment. This British-made pic has a strong lineup of local talent and should register nicely in the domestic market. It deserves to make the grade on merit in overseas territories but lack of marquee names will be a handicap in the U.S. ... Direction by Muriel Box is smooth and efficient."

== Bibliography ==
- Harper, Sue and Porter, Vincent. British Cinema of the 1950s: The Decline of Deference. Oxford University Press, 2007.
