= Meet Mr Lucifer =

1953 British film by Anthony Pelissier

Meet Mr. Lucifer
- Theatrical release quad poster
- Directed by: Anthony Pelissier
- Written by: Monja Danischewsky (scriptwriter) additional dialogue by Peter Myers and Alec Grahame
- Produced by: Monja Danischewsky
- Starring: Stanley Holloway; Peggy Cummins; Jack Watling
- Cinematography: Desmond Dickinson
- Edited by: Bernard Gribble
- Music by: Eric Rogers
- Production company: Ealing Studios
- Distributed by: General Film Distributors
- Release date: 26 November 1953
- Running time: 83 minutes
- Country: United Kingdom
- Language: English

Meet Mr Lucifer (also known as Let's Put out the Light) is a 1953 black-and-white British comedy satire film directed by Anthony Pelisser starring Stanley Holloway, Peggy Cummins and Jack Watling. It is based on the 1951 play Beggar My Neighbour by Arnold Ridley. It opened on 26 November 1953 at the Haymarket Gaumont cinema in London. It was filmed at Ealing Studios, London, and is one of the Ealing comedies. The plot follows a television set that makes people act out of character, with visible encouragement from the Devil in human form.

== Plot ==
Alcoholic actor Sam Hollingsworth plays Satan in a pantomime. When he suffers a blow on his head when going up to his performance in a stage lift, he wakes up in Hell and meets the real Devil. Satan tells the actor that he needs his aid in using television to attract more sinners to eternal damnation.

When Mr Pedelty leaves his firm, he is given a television set as a retirement present. At first, he enjoys all the attention from his neighbours, but soon the attraction wears off, and he sells it on to a young married couple the Nortons, living in the flat above him. They soon encounter the same problems, and again the set is passed on to several different characters all with the same results.

The set passes to the chemist Hector McPhee who falls in love with "The Lonely Hearts Singer" on a television programme. At first he has the same dour character as his maiden aunt, Miss MacPherson. At first, the set improves his character, but as his obsession grows, he becomes increasingly angry at any interruption.

== Cast ==
- Stanley Holloway as Sam Hollingsworth / Mr Lucifer
- Peggy Cummins as Kitty Norton
- Jack Watling as Jim Norton
- Barbara Murray as Patricia Pedelty
- Joseph Tomelty as Mr Pedelty
- Kay Kendall as Lonely Hearts Singer
- Gordon Jackson as Hector McPhee
- Charles Victor as Mr Elder
- Humphrey Lestocq as Arthur
- Jean Cadell as Mrs Macdonald
- Raymond Huntley as Mr Patterson
- Ernest Thesiger as Mr Macdonald
- Frank Pettingell as Mr Roberts
- Olive Sloane as Mrs Stannard
- Gilbert Harding as himself
- Philip Harben as himself
- McDonald Hobley as himself
- David Miller as himself
- Olga Gwynne as Principal Boy
- Joan Sims as Fairy Queen
- Ian Carmichael as Man Friday
- Irene Handl as lady with dog
- Gladys Henson as lady in bus
- Roddy Hughes as Billings
- Eliot Makeham as Edwards
- Bill Fraser as band leader
- Dandy Nichols as Mrs Clarke
- Toke Townley as trumpet player
- Fred Griffiths as removal man
- Lee Patterson as American Sailor
- Richard Molinas as Onion Johnny

== Critical reception ==
The Monthly Film Bulletin wrote: "The challenge of television has already provoked a number of American film companies into some attempt at retaliation, but Meet Mr Lucifer is the first major British effort in this direction. Satire, unfortunately, has the habit of rebounding back on its creator, and the absence of real wit or attack in both script and direction proves, in this case, unfortunate. The numerous owners of this particular television set are all familiar types, and the evil machinations of Mr Lucifer proceed along all too easily forecast lines. In the circumstances, Jack Watling's bad temper resulting from the disruption of his household is easily understood, and the fate of Joseph Tomelty's Mr Pedelty would seem to be a warning against the dangers of excessive hospitality. Kay Kendall's contribution, unfortunately, is limited to the dimensions of the ordinary television screen, and the inclusion of so many close-ups of Gordon Jackson's tortured face peering at her may appear a little excessive. A few scenes, such as the dingy pantomime at the beginning, the square dance sequence, and Hector's despairing efforts to rid himself of his neighbours are pleasantly handled, but the general paucity of comic invention elsewhere makes the film's attempted debunking fall some distance short of its target."

The Radio Times Guide to Films gave the film 2/5 stars, writing: "For every Ealing comedy gem there is at least one poor imitation, packed with cosy caricatures and devoid of the usual satirical bite. This tepid assault on television has Stanley Holloway as a pantomime demon who is sent as an emissary from hell to ensure that TV sets throughout the nation bring nothing but misery."

Leslie Halliwell said: "Clean and occasionally amusing piece of topical satire on tellymania; but the prologue is funner than the sketches."

In British Sound Films: The Studio Years 1928–1959 David Quinlan rated the film as "average", writing: "Satirical comedy has few teeth."
