= Escape (1948 film) =

1948 film by Joseph L. Mankiewicz

- Theatrical release poster
- Directed by: Joseph L. Mankiewicz
- Screenplay by: Philip Dunne
- Based on: Escape by John Galsworthy
- Produced by: William Perlberg
- Starring: Rex Harrison; Peggy Cummins; William Hartnell
- Cinematography: Freddie Young
- Edited by: Alan L. Jaggs
- Music by: William Alwyn
- Distributed by: 20th Century-Fox
- Release dates: March 1948 (London); July 30, 1948 (Los Angeles)
- Running time: 78 minutes
- Countries: United Kingdom; United States
- Language: English

Escape is a 1948 thriller film directed by Joseph L. Mankiewicz and starring Rex Harrison, Peggy Cummins and William Hartnell. The screenplay by Philip Dunne was based on the 1926 play Escape by John Galsworthy, which had previously been filmed in 1930. A Royal Air Force World War II veteran goes to prison and then escapes and meets a woman who persuades him to surrender.

== Plot ==
A former RAF squadron leader, Matt Denant, goes to Hendley, England to visit an airfield run by his friend Titch. Rodgers, an employee at the airfield, asks Matt to do him a favour by making a large wager on a horse. Matt does, but when the horse loses, Rodgers promises to repay him.

While Matt is strolling through Hyde Park, a woman strikes up a conversation, but Penter, a detective, charges her with unlawful soliciting. Matt intervenes on her behalf, but when the two men fight, Penter knocks his head on a park bench and is mortally wounded.

Matt is placed under arrest; he is then sentenced to three years in prison after Penter dies. Believing it an unjust punishment, Matt escapes. Inspector Harris of Scotland Yard is assigned to find him, while Matt takes refuge in the home of Sir James Winton, whose daughter Dora helps him hide.

Titch gives an aeroplane to Matt, enabling him to flee to France, but he is betrayed by Rodgers after the police offer a reward. Matt's plane is caught in a heavy fog and crashes. He survives and takes refuge in a farm. Dora finds him and professes her love, also persuading Matt that he must turn himself in to the law.

== Cast ==
- Rex Harrison as Matt Denant
- Peggy Cummins as Dora Winton
- William Hartnell as Inspector Harris
- Peter Croft as Titch
- Stuart Lindsell as Sir James Winton
- Norman Wooland as Minister
- Jill Esmond as Grace Winton
- Frederick Piper as Brownie the convict
- Marjorie Rhodes as Mrs. Pinkem
- Betty Ann Davies as girl in park
- Cyril Cusack as Rodgers
- John Slater as salesman
- Frank Pettingell as Constable Beames
- Michael Golden as Detective Penter
- Frederick Leister as Judge
- Walter Hudd as Defence Counsel
- Maurice Denham as Crown Counsel
- Patrick Troughton as Jim the shepherd

== Reception ==
The Monthly Film Bulletin wrote: "When the stage play Escape was so excellently performed between the wars its episodic form immediately suggested its suitability for adaptation to the screen. This adaptation has now taken place, but with what result? Where are Galsworthy's plot and subtleties of characterisation of yesteryear? What remains is a film of a commonplace type, in which all the characters conform to the full to the usual screen tradition. Quality seems to show itself chiefly in the photography of Dartmoor and the acting of William Hartnell."

The Daily Film Renter wrote: "The modern version of Galsworthy's famous play about an escaped convict has been freshened for present-day audiences by making the fugitivehero an ex-flyer. This heightens onsiderably his sense of being trapped in a prison cell and desperate need for freedom, though the main essentials have also been preserved, the convict's passionate belief that his sentence was unjust, his meeting with a girl who tries to help him, the police dragnet over Dartmoor, and his subsequent recapture. Rex Harrison and Peggy Cummins are both excellent."

A.H. Weiler of The New York Times wrote: "As the harried convict, Rex Harrison gives a restrained but persuasive portrait of a man beset not only by physical but moral tribulations ... The pace of Escape, as set by director Joseph L. Mankiewicz, is, on occasion, slower than might be desired, and scenarist Philip Dunne's script is sometimes given to lengthy conversation. But these are minor flaws in an adult work, which unspectacularly and effectively does justice to a serious theme.

Variety wrote: "For this remake of John Galsworthy's play ... 20th-Fox imported two topnotchers in William Perlberg and Joseph Mankiewicz. Result, although not Galsworthy, is eminently satisfying, and will play to good business."
