= Brendan J. Stafford =

Irish cinematographer (1915–1991)

- Born: 1 February 1915; Dublin, Ireland
- Died: 16 July 1991; Petersfield, Hampshire, England
- Occupation: Cinematographer
- Years active: 1944–1985 (film)

Brendan James Stafford BSC (1 February 1915 – 16 July 1991) was an Irish cinematographer known for his work on British films and television. He also directed three films.

== Selected filmography ==
=== Film ===
- Fortune Lane (1947)
- Paul Temple's Triumph (1950)
- Stranger at My Door (1950) (director)
- The Wallet (1952)
- The Night Won't Talk (1952)
- The Armchair Detective (1952) (director)
- Circumstantial Evidence (1952)
- Men Against the Sun (1952) (director)
- Eight O'Clock Walk (1954)
- Bang! You're Dead (1954)
- Profile (1954)
- One Jump Ahead (1955)
- The Hostage (1956)
- The Hideout (1956)
- Date with Disaster (1957)
- There's Always a Thursday (1957)
- The Man Without a Body (1957)
- Witness in the Dark (1959)
- The Shakedown (1959)
- Your Money or Your Wife (March 1960)
- And Women Shall Weep (April 1960)
- Crossplot (1969)
- Clinic Exclusive (1971)

=== Television ===
- Fabian of the Yard (1954–1956)
- The Invisible Man (1959)
- Danger Man (1960)
- Sir Francis Drake (1961–1962)
- Man of the World (1962–1963)
- The Sentimental Agent (1963)
- Danger Man (1964–1966)
- The Prisoner (1967–1968)
- The Saint (1968–1969)
- UFO (1969–1970)
- The Protectors (1972–1974)

== Bibliography ==
- Chibnall, Steve & McFarlane, Brian. The British 'B' Film. Palgrave MacMillan, 2009.
