= Dance Little Lady =

1954 British film by Val Guest

Dance, Little Lady
- UK theatrical poster
- Directed by: Val Guest
- Written by: Val Guest; Doreen Montgomery
- Story by: R. Howard Alexander; Alfred Dunning
- Produced by: George Minter
- Starring: Terence Morgan; Mai Zetterling; Guy Rolfe; Mandy Miller
- Cinematography: Wilkie Cooper
- Edited by: John Pomeroy
- Music by: Ronald Binge
- Production company: Alderdale Films
- Distributed by: Renown Pictures
- Release date: 13 July 1954
- Running time: 87 minutes
- Country: United Kingdom
- Language: English
- Budget: £76,669

Dance, Little Lady is a 1954 British drama film directed by Val Guest and starring Terence Morgan, Mai Zetterling, Guy Rolfe and Mandy Miller. The screenplay was by Guest and Doreen Montgomery from a story by R. Howard Alexander and Alfred Dunning.

The film was made by independent producer George Minter and distributed by his Renown Pictures.

== Plot ==
Prima ballerina Nina Gordon is being financially exploited by her husband Mark. On the night of her triumphant Royal Opera House debut, she discovers he is also being unfaithful. Distraught, she leaves the party they were attending. However, Mark pulls up in their car and she gets in and he drives off at speed into the night. There is a car crash and Nina's leg is badly broken.

Learning that she'll never dance again, Nina is abandoned by Mark. But with the help of a sympathetic doctor, Nina recovers the use of her legs, and begins to live her life vicariously through her talented daughter. When Mark reenters Nina's life, intending to take control of the daughter's dancing career, he finds the tables are turned on him.

== Cast ==
- Terence Morgan as Mark Gordon
- Mai Zetterling as Nina Gordon
- Guy Rolfe as Dr. John Ransome
- Mandy Miller as Jill Gordon
- Eunice Gayson as Adele
- Reginald Beckwith as Poldi
- Ina De La Haye as Madame Bayanova
- Harold Lang as Mr. Bridson
- Lisa Gastoni as Amaryllis
- Jane Aird as Mary
- David Poole as Dancer
- Maryon Lane as Dancer
- Richard O'Sullivan as Peter
- William Kendall as Mr. Matthews
- Joan Hickson as Mrs. Matthews
- Alexander Gauge as Joseph Miller
- Vera Day as Gladys
- Gabrielle Blunt as Switchboard Operator
- Marianne Stone as Nurse
- Helen Goss as Neighbour
- Joan Benham as Nurse
- Molly Lumley as Dresser
- Jane Asher as Child
- Ronald Dorey as Fire Engine Driver

== Production ==
The film was shot in Eastmancolor at the Walton Studios near London. The sets were designed by the art director Frederick Pusey.

== Reception ==
=== Box office ===
According to Kinematograph Weekly the film was a "money maker" at the British box office in 1954.

=== Critical ===
The Monthly Film Bulletin wrote: "This film gives the appearance of having been rather carelessly made. The plot and dialogue are full of clichés; improbabilities and contradictions abound. As a ballet film it is unsatisfying; the short glimpses of Giselle (danced by David Poole and Maryon Lane) are very brief. The excessive sentiment is reflected in the musical score. Terence Morgan is quite unconvincing as the irresponsible husband; Mai Zetterling and Mandy Miller are efficient. Guy Rolfe alone gives a really creditable performance. The colour (by Eastman Color) is good."

Kinematograph Weekly wrote: "The picture wears its heart on its sleeve and its lack of pretence commends it to all classes. ...Val Guest's treatment is as competent as the acting. "

The Radio Times wrote, "the dance sequences are fine, but the poor production values ruin the look of the film".

TV Guide called it "a trite film".

Sky Movies wrote, "Terence Morgan makes the best impression, as a sponger as smooth as he is nasty, in this ballet-orientated story, tailored to the talents of Britain's then screen wonder child, Mandy Miller. It bases its appeal on a blend of small-girl sentiment, highly coloured melodramatics and ballet (the dance ensembles are very well done). Mai Zetterling and Guy Rolfe provide rather limp support to Mandy's undeniable charm, but the story's fiery climax is most effective."
