= Norman Williams (producer) =

British actor (1918–2010)

Norman Williams (7 June 1918 – 27 March 2010) was a British actor and film producer born in Holywell, Flintshire. He acted in the 1940s and early 1950s before turning to producing.

== Selected credits ==
- Once a Sinner (1950)
- The Errol Flynn Theatre (1956)
- White Hunter (1957)
- Witness in the Dark (1959) - (starring Williams' wife, Patricia Dainton)
- The Shakedown (1960)
- Your Money or Your Wife (1960)
- And Women Shall Weep (1960)
- Piccadilly Third Stop (1960)
- It's All Happening (1963)
- The Man Who Finally Died (1963)
- Five Golden Dragons (1967) - production supervisor
- The Million Eyes of Sumuru (1967) - production supervisor
