= The Crime of the Century (TV series) =

British TV drama series (1956–1957)

The Crime of the Century is a British television drama which aired 1956 to 1957 on the BBC. It was created by English solicitor and crime fiction writer Michael Gilbert. A serial consisting of six episodes, the drama centered around the lawyer Mr. Brakewell (portrayed by Edward Chapman), his secretary Clare Pinnock (Gene Anderson), and his associates Charlton Bradbury (William Lucas), Major Trump (Ballard Berkeley), and M. Bernard (Patrick Westwood). Only a single episode survives in the archives.
