= You're in My Arms =

Single by Vera Lynn
- Released: 1941
- Composer(s): Michael Carr
- Lyricist(s): Jack Popplewell

"You're in my Arms (and a million miles away)" is a 1941 song by Vera Lynn, with music by Michael Carr and lyrics by Jack Popplewell. Lynn recorded it with Mantovani and his Orchestra, and a version followed by Anne Shelton with Bert Ambrose and his Orchestra, also in 1941. Leslie Hutchinson (Hutch) recorded the song around this time too.
