= A Mask for Alexis =

British television series

- Genre: Thriller
- Written by: Lindsay Hardy
- Directed by: Eric Fawcett
- Starring: David Knight; Harriette Johns; Ina De La Haye
- Country of origin: United Kingdom
- Original language: English
- No. of series: 1
- No. of episodes: 6

Production
- Producer: Eric Fawcett
- Running time: 30 minutes
- Production company: BBC

Original release
- Network: BBC 1
- Release: 21 September – 26 October 1959

A Mask for Alexis is a British six-part television series that originally aired on BBC in 6 episodes between 21 September and 26 October 1959.

== Main cast ==
- David Knight as Christopher March
- Harriette Johns as Elaine Brant
- Edward Cast as DS Edwards
- Barry Steele as PC Courtney
- Gene Anderson as Brenda Carpenter
- Ewen Solon as DI Fenner
- Ina De La Haye as Marguerite Clouzot
- Julian Sherrier as Raven
- Toke Townley as Paul Weeks

== Bibliography ==
- Baskin, Ellen . Serials on British Television, 1950-1994. Scolar Press, 1996.
