= Tread Softly Stranger =

- UK release poster
- Directed by: Gordon Parry
- Written by: George Minter
- Based on: play Blind Alley by Jack Popplewell
- Produced by: Denis O'Dell
- Starring: Diana Dors; George Baker; Terence Morgan
- Cinematography: Douglas Slocombe
- Edited by: Anthony Harvey
- Music by: Tristram Cary
- Production companies: Alderdale; George Minter Productions
- Distributed by: Renown Pictures
- Release date: August 1958
- Running time: 87 minutes
- Country: United Kingdom
- Language: English

Tread Softly Stranger is a 1958 British crime drama film directed by Gordon Parry and starring Diana Dors, George Baker and Terence Morgan. The screenplay was written by George Minter adapted from the stage play Blind Alley (1953) by Jack Popplewell. The film was shot in black-and-white in film noir style, and its setting in a fictional industrial town in northern England mirrors the kitchen sink realism movement coming into vogue in English drama and film at the time.

== Plot ==
Johnny Mansell has fled to the Yorkshire steel town of Rawborough, once his home town, after racking up large gambling debts in London. He moves into a cramped boarding house where his brother Dave, a clerk in a local steel mill, was already living; Dave has a girlfriend Calico, a hostess in a local nightclub, who lives close by and their flats have neighbouring flat roof spaces, which the three often use. Johnny discovers that Dave has been stealing money from the mill where he works, spending the money on Calico. While Johnny works on a scheme to get enough money to cover up Dave’s fraud and pay off his own debts with a win on the racetrack, Calico comes up with her own plan for the brothers to steal the payroll at Dave's workplace and pay off their debts with the proceeds. Although Johnny wins the money at the track, he is robbed by gangsters from London who recognise him there and instead, the brothers try to carry out Calico’s plan to steal the payroll but they mistakenly kill a night watchman, the father of their best friend in the town, with a gun that Calico lent Dave.

== Cast ==
- Diana Dors as Calico
- George Baker as Johnny Mansell
- Terence Morgan as Dave Mansell
- Patrick Allen as Paddy Ryan
- Jane Griffiths as Sylvia
- Joseph Tomelty as Joe Ryan
- Thomas Heathcote as Sgt. Lamb
- Russell Napier as Potter
- Norman MacOwan as Danny
- Maureen Delany as Mrs. Finnegan
- Betty Warren as Flo
- Timothy Bateson as Fletcher
- John Salew as Pawnbroker
- Michael Golden as St. John's Ambulance Man
- George Merritt as Timekeeper
- Andrew Keir as Inspector Harris
- Hal Osmond as Flatcap
- Norman Pierce as Publican
- Patrick Crean as Blue Blazer
- Wilfrid Lawson as Holroyd (uncredited)
- Jerold Wells as Constable at racecourse (uncredited)

== Blind Alley ==
Blind Alley
- Original language: English
- Written by: Jack Popplewell
- Genre: crime

Premiere
- Date: January 20, 1953
- Place: Q Theatre, London
- Directed by: Hulbert Gregg

The movie was based on a 1953 play by Jack Popplewell called Blind Alley. It was Popplewell's first play; when he wrote it he was better known as a songwriter and the success of the play launched him as a playwright. The original production starred John Gregson and was directed by Hulbert Gregg. The Daily Telegraph called it "an original and accomplished thriller."

The play received numerous productions over the following years. George Minter, who wrote and produced the film, called the original play a "money maker". Jackie Collins appeared in a 1958 production in Manchester.

The play was adapted for Australian radio in 1961.

== Production ==
In May 1957 it was announced the play would be turned into a film called Tread Softly Stranger by Renown Studios.

George Minter said he worked on the script for two years. Producer Denis O'Dell said "I don’t claim to be a creative writer or a wizard at writing marvellous dialogue, but I do claim to know what makes a script tick. And that is important, because you have nothing if your screenplay is badly constructed."

The film was shot at Walton Studios in Walton-on-Thames and on location in Parkgate, Rotherham. Gordon Parry said "This is the kind of off-beat, realistic subject that a director is always looking for."

The eponymous theme tune was sung by Jim Dale.

== Box office ==
Kinematograph Weekly listed it as being "in the money" at the British box office in 1958 and had "scored" commercially.

== Critical reception ==
In British Sound Films: The Studio Years 1928–1959 David Quinlan wrote: ''Thriller has silly dialogue, fails to make use of Rotherham backgrounds.''

Leslie Halliwell wrote: "Hilarious murky melodrama full of glum faces, with a well-worn trick ending; rather well photographed."

The Radio Times Guide to Films gave the film 1/5 stars, writing: "The big question here is, what on earth were Diana Dors, Terence Morgan and George Baker doing in such a dreary little film? Director Gordon Parry was capable of making involving pictures, but here he insists on his cast delivering each line as if it had the dramatic weight of a Russian novel, which is more than a little preposterous for a petty melodrama about criminal brothers falling for the same girl."

== Release ==
Tread Softly Stranger received its first DVD release in the UK in 2008.
