= Riviera Police =

British TV crime series (1965)

- Genre: Crime drama
- Starring: Brian Spink; Noel Trevarthen; Frank Lieberman; Geoffrey Frederick
- Theme music composer: Laurie Johnson
- Country of origin: United Kingdom
- Original language: English
- No. of series: 1
- No. of episodes: 13 (8 missing)

Production
- Producer: Jordan Lawrence
- Editor: John Zambardi
- Running time: 55 mins
- Production company: Rediffusion London

Original release
- Network: ITV
- Release: 2 August – 27 October 1965

Riviera Police is a British television crime drama series that sees three international police officers, from England, Australia, and Canada, seconded to the Prefect of Marseille with a local French officer. French Inspector Legrand appeared in all episodes (filmed in London studios) while the other three alternated between episodes, often filming on location in France.

== Cast ==
- Brian Spink as Inspector Legrand
- Noel Trevarthen as Superintendent Barney Johnson
- Frank Lieberman as Lieutenant Colonel Sorel
- Geoffrey Frederick as Superintendent Adam Hunter

== Reception ==
Early episodes outperformed Coronation Street becoming the countries most popular TV series. The producers were told to tone down some of the content or they would be moved to a later time slot.

Milton Shulman of the Evening Standard was highly critical of the series. He wrote "Determined to cash in on the success of such sophisticated thrillers as Burke's Law, Riviera Police seems to be on every count merely a bumbling, pathetic copy from its colourless four detectives—some recruited from the Dominions to make them palatable in Australia or Canada—to the dire selection of cretinous plots chosen by its editor and producer, Jordan Lawrence."

== Surviving Episodes ==
8 of the 13 episodes produced are missing, the 5 surviving episodes are as follows:

- Episode 1: Who Can Catch a Falling Star? (2 August 1965)
- Episode 3: The Lucky One Was the Snake (16 August 1965)
- Episode 4: But The Company She Keeps (23 August 1965)
- Episode 5: Duet for Two Guns (30 August 1965)
- Episode 7: Take It Sideways and Pray (13 September 1965)
