= Glyn Dearman =

English actor (1939–1997)

- Glyn Dearman as Tiny Tim in Scrooge
- Born: 30 December 1939; London, England
- Died: 30 November 1997 (aged 57); London, England
- Occupation: Actor
- Years active: 1948–1966
- Known for: Playing Tiny Tim in Scrooge
- Spouse: Susan MacDonald (1961–1967) (divorced)

Glyn Dearman (30 December 1939 – 30 November 1997) was an English actor, originally a child actor, whose career spanned almost two decades, including the eponymous Jennings in BBC Children's Hour "Jennings at School". Dearman is perhaps best remembered for his portrayal of the character Tiny Tim in the 1951 film Scrooge. He was also a BBC Radio producer in the latter part of his career and directed the radio plays of Angela Carter. He died after falling down a flight of stairs at his home on 30 November 1997, at the age of 57.

== Filmography ==
Year	Title	Role	Notes
1948	The Small Voice	Ken Moss	Film debut
1951	Scrooge	Tiny Tim	
1951	Tom Brown's Schooldays	Arthur	
1953	Four Sided Triangle	Bill as a Child	
1960	The Flesh and the Fiends	Student	Final film, Uncredited
