= David Knight (actor) =

American actor (1928–2020)

- Born: January 16, 1928; Niagara Falls, New York, U.S.
- Died: December 20, 2020 (aged 92)
- Occupation: Actor
- Years active: 1954–1975 (film and television)

David Stephen Knight (January 16, 1928 – December 20, 2020) was an American film and television actor who worked for many years in Britain. He began his screen career as a contract player for the Rank Organisation who used him as the male lead in several of its productions.

He was married in 1963 to the Scottish actress Wendy McClure (1930–2022) and they had two children.

== Selected filmography ==
=== Film ===
- The Young Lovers (1954)
- Out of the Clouds (1955)
- On Such a Night (1955)
- Eyewitness (1956)
- Lost (1956)
- Across the Bridge (1957)
- Battle of the V-1 (1958)
- Clue of the Twisted Candle (1960)
- A Story of David (1961)
- The Devil's Agent (1962)
- Nightmare (1964)

=== Television ===
- A Mask for Alexis (1959)
- Interpol Calling (1960)
- Sergeant Cork (1966)
- Mrs Thursday (1966)
- The Newcomers (1966–67)
- Emergency-Ward 10 (1967)

== Bibliography ==
- Ryall, Tom. Anthony Asquith. Manchester University Press, 2013.
- Spicer, Andrew. Sydney Box. Manchester University Press, 2006.
