= The Errol Flynn Theatre =

- Genre: Anthology
- Starring: Errol Flynn
- Theme music composer: Eric Spear
- Country of origin: England
- Original language: English
- No. of seasons: 1
- No. of episodes: 26

Production
- Producer: Norman Williams
- Running time: 30 mins

Original release
- Release: 1956; March 1957 (US)

The Errol Flynn Theatre is an anthology series presented by Errol Flynn, who would also play the lead in every fourth show. His wife Patrice Wymore and son Sean also made appearances.

== Production ==
Filming started 1 March 1956 and was done by Inter Film TV.

It was shot in England at Bray Studios but was made for the American market. In May 1956 Flynn said all money from the show went to pay for his debts.

== Episodes ==
Date	Title	Director	Writer	Cast	Notes
16 Sept 1956	A Wife for the Czar			Errol Flynn, Patrice Wymore, Francis de Wolff	
22 Sept 1956	The Girl in Blue Jeans			Glynis Johns, Herbert Lom, Lloyd Lamble	
29 Sept 1956	The Model			Patrice Wymore, Christopher Lee	
6 Oct 1956	The Duel			Errol Flynn	
13 Oct 1956	The Mirror And Markheim			Patrice Wymore	
20 Oct 1956	The Red Geranium			Betta St. John, Leslie Phillips and William Hartnell	
3 Nov 1956	Farewell Performance			Patricia Roc	
10 Nov 1956	The Fortunes of War			Errol Flynn, Christopher Lee and Lisa Daniely	
17 Nov 1956	Mademoiselle Fifi			Paulette Goddard, Peter Reynolds and Ian Fleming	
24 Nov 1956	The Ordeals of Carol Kennedy	John Lemont		Patrice Wymore, Derek Bond	
18 Nov 1956	The Transfer			Brian Aherne, James Donald	
1 Dec 1956	The Sealed Room			Glynis Johns, Herbert Lom, Patrick Allen and Frederick Schrecker	
6 Dec 1956	The Kinsman			Peter Reynolds	
22 Dec 1956	Evil Thoughts	John Lemont	based on short story by Robert Louis Stevenson	Christopher Lee, Philip Saville, Arthur Lowe	
16 Feb 1957	Love Token			Christopher Lee	
23 Feb 1957	My Infallible Uncle			June Havoc and Hugh Martin	
2 Mar 1957	Strange Auction		Brock Williams	Errol Flynn, Patrice Wymore, Sean Flynn	
9 Marc 1957	The Rustle of Silk			Phyllis Kirk	
6 Apr 1957	The Cellini Cup			Mai Zetterling and Guy Middleton	
13 Apr 1957	Rescued			Errol Flynn, Hugh Moxey, Andrew Keir, Maurice Kaufmann and Bartlett Mullins	
20 April 1957	First Come, First Loved			Jean-Pierre Aumont	
27 Apr 1957	All in the Family			Mai Zetterling	
4 May 1957	Declasse			Phyllis Kirk	
11 May 1957	Out of the Blue			Rosanna Rory and Robert Arden	
23 May 1957	Take the High Road			June Havoc	
1 Feb 1958	The 1000th Night of Don Juan			Errol Flynn as Don Juan, Jean Kent	

== Reception ==
Filmink magazine later wrote that watching the show "you get the sense of what some of his [Flynn's] work for Northampton Rep must have been like – playing all sorts of different roles, sometimes pulling it off, other times not so much."

== Archive Status ==
All 26 episodes exist and are held at ITV.
