= The Last Man Out =

1962 British TV drama series

The Last Man Out is a British television drama series written, produced and directed by Shaun Sutton. The six-part black and white series was first aired on BBC One in 1962. All six episodes were later wiped, and are believed to be lost.

The signature tune was Lillibullero.

== Cast ==
- Graham Ashley
- David Hargreaves
- Barry Letts
- Francis Matthews
- Jack Melford
- Anthony Sagar
- Patrick Cargill
- Michael Vernon
- Peter Welch
- Meadows White
- Richard Hurndall
- John Welsh
- Enid Lorimer as Madame Matilde
