= Your Money or Your Wife =

1960 British film by Anthony Simmons

- British quad poster by Renato Fratini
- Directed by: Anthony Simmons
- Screenplay by: Ronald Jeans
- Produced by: Norman Williams
- Starring: Donald Sinden; Peggy Cummins; Richard Wattis
- Cinematography: Brendan J. Stafford
- Edited by: Bernard Gribble
- Music by: Philip Green
- Production company: Ethiro-Alliance
- Distributed by: J. Arthur Rank Film Distributors (UK)
- Release date: 28 March 1960 (UK)
- Running time: 91 minutes
- Country: United Kingdom
- Language: English

Your Money or Your Wife is a 1960 British comedy film directed by Anthony Simmons and starring Donald Sinden, Peggy Cummins and Richard Wattis. It was written by Ronald Jeans based on his 1951 play Count Your Blessings. A couple must divorce in order to inherit a fortune.

== Cast ==
- Donald Sinden as Pelham Butterworth
- Peggy Cummins as Gay Butterworth
- Richard Wattis as Hubert Fry
- Peter Reynolds as Theodore Malek
- Georgina Cookson as Thelma Cressingdon
- Gladys Boot as Mrs. Compton Chamberlain
- Barbara Steele as Juliet Frost
- Betty Baskcomb as Janet Fry
- Olive Sloane as Mrs. Withers
- Ian Fleming as the judge
- Candy Scott as the maid
- Noel Trevarthen as the chauffeur

== Production ==
Donald Sinden recalled the film in his memoirs:

Oh dear. Unfortunately it was made on the cheap and little care had been taken turning a script, intended to be played in one permanent setting, into a film. It was merely chopped into sections: one to be played in the living room, another in the bedroom, the next in the garage, the next in the kitchen. This left endless shots of actors walking in silence from one place to another before continuing the dialogue. As someone wisely pointed out, a movie means that the action should move — not the camera.

== Box office ==
In April 1960 Kinematograph Weekly reported the film "hasn't made a big impact on the box-office. The film is good in parts, but let’s face it, it’s hardly a vintage comedy."

== Critical reception ==
The Monthly Film Bulletin said "This is an erratic mixture of light comedy and broad farce, the rules of both styles being treated with something very like contempt. Peggy Cummins and Donald Sinden labour solemnly, but a wordy, static script curbs their style and robs the rest of the cast stuck with familiar characterisations of incomprehensible bearded foreigners, over-sexed misunderstood spinsters, etc.— of all spontaneity. Such action as there is grinds to a halt every time a loose stair-rod or an overflowing glass of milk urgently telegraphs."

Variety said "Here is an inept little comedy of unremitting silliness, nothing of the wit of which the screenplay writer, Roland Jeans, has shown himself capable of in the past. Popularity of the stars, Donald Sinden and Peggy Cummins, may make it a useful filler for undiscriminating British houses. But on the whole the entire project can be written off as a sad mistake."

In the Radio Times, David Parkinson gave the film one out of five stars, writing, "Nice title, shame about the movie ... Both screenwriter Ronald Jeans and director Anthony Simmons seemed to think that an abundance of slapstick, a little innuendo and bags of mugging would be enough to have the audience in convulsions."

In British Sound Films: The Studio Years 1928–1959 David Quinlan rated the film as "poor", writing: "Very heavy farce, the performances smack of desperation."
