= Noel Trevarthen =

New Zealand actor (1938–2006?)

- Born: 1938; Auckland, New Zealand
- Died: 2006; Auckland, New Zealand
- Occupation: Actor
- Years active: 1959–1999

Noel Trevarthen was a New Zealand actor who worked largely in England and Australia, active from 1959 to 1999.

Trevarthen was first based in England where he starred in Riviera Police and in extended run of Watch It, Sailor at the Apollo Theatre in the West End. While on holiday in Australia he played a lead in Motel before heading back to England, later temporarily returning to Australia for The Rovers. Trevarthen played the butler Gerard in Carson's Law, a role that saw him win the 1984 Logie Award for Best Supporting Actor in a Series.

== Filmography ==
Film
Year	Title	Character
1959	Witness in the Dark	Sgt Jones
1960	Sink the Bismarck!	Pilot- RAF operations
1960	Your Money or Your Wife	The Chauffeur
1960	Escort for Hire	Steve
1961	Fate Takes a Hand	Bob
1962	Backfire!	Jack Bryce
1963	To Have and to Hold	Blake
1964	A Hard Day's Night	journalist (uncredited)
1967	The Vengeance of Fu Manchu	Mark Weston
1967	It!	inspector white
1968	Wonderwall	Policemen
1968	Corruption	Steve Harris
1973	Take Me High	Paul
1974	The Abdication	Ginetti
1974	Great Expectations	Sergeant
1978	Bit Part	Cunningham
1982	Deadline	Kimball
1983	Dusty	Harry Morrison
1987	The Facts of Life Down Under	Roger Pitt
1993	Crimebroker	gallery host (uncredited)

Television
Year	Show	Character	Network	Episodes
1959	BBC Sunday Night Theatre	Roy McDowell	BBC	1
1960	Spy-Catcher	Muller	BBC	1
1961	Danger Man	Gino Barelli	ITV	1
1962	Drama 61-67	Vince	ITV	1
1962	The Cheaters	Dennis Collingham (uncredited)	ITV	1
1962	The Rag Trade	Dr Blake	BBC	1
1962	Dixon of Dock Green	Bill Grass	BBC	1
1962	Emergency-Ward 10	Ian Duncan	ITV	1
1962–1963	Edgar Wallace Mysteries	Jack Bryce / Blake	unknown	2
1963	The Sentiment Agent	Nalo	ITV	1
1963–1964	The Plane Makers	Davies	ITV	2
1963–1964	The Saint	Joe Casey / Jack Bryant	ITV	2
1965	Hit and Run	Bill Deane	ITV	4
1964–1965	No Hiding Place	Thornton-Smith / Anthony Blythe	ITV	2
1965	The Flying Swan	Det Sgt Alan Cooke	ITV	4
1965	Riviera Police	Superintendent Johnson	ITV	6
1965	The Scales of Justice	Lewis Carter	ITV	1
1968	Motel	Rod Gillian	Seven Network	135
1968	Contrabandits	Sancter	ABC	1
1969	Riptide	John Bannerman	Seven Network	1
1969–1970	The Rovers	Bob Wild	Network 10	2
1970	The Long Arm	Don Fraser	Network 10	1
1971	The Godfathers	Dr John Evans	Nine Network	2
1971	Dynasty	French	ABC	1
1971	Pukemanu	David Gold	NZBC	1
1972	Spyder's Web	Waldman	ITV	1
1972	Pathfinders	F/Lt David Greenwood	ITV	1
1973	Now Look Here	Keith	BBC	1
1973	Pardon My Genie	director	ITV	1
1973	Arthur of the Britons	Nester	ITV	1
1972–1973	Play of the Month	Mr Hooper / Host	BBC	2
1975	Explorers	performer	BBC	1
1976	The Emigrants	Mr Warren	ABC/BBC	1
1976	The New Avengers	Tony Field	ITV	1
1977	The Young Doctors	Philip Winter	Nine Network	20
1977–1979	The Restless Years	Jeff Archer	Network 10	73
1978–1982	Cop Shop	varieties	Seven Network	9
1978	Glenview High	Alan	Seven Network	1
1978	Chopper Squad	Dr Edward Allen	Network 10	6
1979	Skyways	Edwin Silvers	Seven Network	1
1979	Ride on Stranger	Chaverin Brome	ABC	1
1980	The Timeless Land	Collins	ABC	1
1981–1983	The Sullivans	Mueller / Det Sgt Doug Shearer	Nine Network	16
1981	Holiday Island	George Norris	Network 10	1
1982	Sons and Daughters	Solicitor	Seven Network	2
1983–1984	Carson's Law	Gerard Kent	Network 10	184
1985	Five Mile Creek	Michael Callaghan	Seven Network	1
1985	Anzacs	Haig	Nine Network	3
1987	The Far Country	Dr Edwards	Seven Network	2
1987–1988	Neighbours	Malcolm Clarke	Network 10	35
1987–1991	Rafferty's Rules	Tony Williams	Seven Network	5
1988	Captain James Cook	Palliser	ABC	2
1989	Mission: Impossible	Mr Carothers	Nine Network/ABC	1
1989	Home and Away	Ian McTavish	Seven Network	4
1989–1993	A Country Practice	Doug Briggs	Seven Network	6
1990	The Flying Doctors	Ray Burgess	Nine Network	1
1991	Gold	Mungo Haigh	TVNZ	4
1993	E Street	Rory Van Loren	Network 10	3
1994	G.P.	Alex Browning	ABC	2
1995	High Tide	Andrew MacMillan	Syndication	1
1995	Hercules: The Legendary Journeys	King Midas/King Iphicles	Syndication	2
1996	The Enid Blyton A Venture Series	Sir Geoffrey Houghton	Disney Channel	1
1997	Duggan	Walter Jamison	TVNZ	1
1998	Young Hercules	King Aeson	Fox Kids	1
1999	Greenstone	Lord Halford	TVNZ	1
