= The Shakedown (1959 film) =

British crime-drama by John Lemont

- Original British poster
- Directed by: John Lemont
- Written by: John Lemont; Leigh Vance
- Produced by: Norman Williams
- Starring: Terence Morgan; Hazel Court; Donald Pleasence; Bill Owen; Robert Beatty; Harry H. Corbett
- Cinematography: Brendan J. Stafford
- Edited by: Bernard Gribble
- Music by: Philip Green
- Production company: Ethiro-Alliance
- Distributed by: J. Arthur Rank Film Distributors
- Release date: January 1960
- Running time: 92 minutes
- Country: United Kingdom
- Language: English

The Shakedown (also known as The Naked Mirror) is a 1959 British crime-drama film directed by John Lemont, starring Terence Morgan, Hazel Court, and Donald Pleasence. It was written by Lemont and Leigh Vance. A ruthless crook runs a blackmail operation, falls for an undercover cop, and is murdered by one of his victims.

== Plot ==
Augustus ("Augie") Cortona is released from prison and opens a modelling school and photographic studio that serves as a front for amateurs to take erotic photographs. It's a blackmail set-up: the participants are photographed through a one-way mirror.

Scotland Yard investigate Cortona and send undercover officer Mildred Eyde to enrol as a model. Cortona falls for Eyde.

Eyde's cover is blown when an ex-con recognizes her. Police raid the studio to rescue her. Cortona tries to flee but is shot by one of his blackmail victims. As Cortona lies dying, despite her feelings of disgust, Eyde tries to comfort him. With his last breath, he says "You're a bitch".

== Cast ==
- Terence Morgan as Augie Cortona
- Hazel Court as Mildred Eyde
- Donald Pleasence as Jessel Brown
- Bill Owen as David Spettigue
- Robert Beatty as Chief Inspector Bob Jarvis
- Harry H. Corbett as Gollar
- Gene Anderson as Zena
- Eddie Byrne as George, barman
- John Salew as John Arnold
- Georgina Cookson as Miss Firbank
- Linda Castle as Sylvia
- Jackie Collins as Rita Mason (credited as Lynn Curtis)
- Joan Haythorne as Miss Ogilvie
- Sheila Buxton as Nadia the nightclub singer
- Dorinda Stevens as Grace
- Jack Lambert as Sergeant Kershaw
- Charles Lamb as Pinza
- Edward Judd as Bernie
- Larry Taylor as second thug
- Angela Douglas as model
- Arthur Lovegrove as barman
- Paul Whitsun-Jones as fat drinker
- Diana Chesney as purple woman
- Timothy Bateson as estate agent
- Neal Arden as Harry Bowers

== Production ==
The film was made at Twickenham Film Studios, and on location.

The theme song "Shakedown" was sung by Kathy Kirby.

== Release ==
The film was banned in Finland (known there as Häväistyksen kauppiaat).

== Critical reception ==
The Monthly Film Bulletin wrote: "This tentative and equivocal effort to cash in on the Wolfenden Report remains undistinguished for good or ill. There is enough nudity for an X Certificate, but it is all very prim; enough action to maintain interest, but no tension; routine coshings, but no sadism; cheap settings, but not shoddiness. Except for the error, or possibly box-office stratagem, of giving someone as good-natured and refined of speech as Terence Morgan a vice spiv's role, everything is fairly competently done. Yet the overall attack is so limp that Mildred might finally be revealed as a blackmailer, Mr. Arnold as a policewoman and Augie as a secret bank manager, and who would care?"

Kine Weekly wrote: "Full-blooded sex melodrama, unfolded beneath the shadows of blue and red lamps. It tells how a comely policewoman, aided by the vice squad, busts a nude photography racket, created to circumvent the Street Offences Act, and ends a gang war. The play, vigorously acted, shrewdly directed and lavishly mounted, seldom taxes the imagination, but, apart from one nude picture contains no crude gimmicks."

Leslie Halliwell called the film "A semi-remake set in the squalid London so beloved of film makers at the time, before it became 'swinging'. Of no interest or entertainment value."

The Radio Times Guide to Films gave the film 2/5 stars, writing: "[the film] sets out to shock with sleazy settings and sensationalist suggestions of nudity. However, few of the misdemeanors from this period piece would raise even a blush today. Director John Lemont forgets to concentrate on the storyline, which grinds to its inevitable conclusion."

In British Sound Films: The Studio Years 1928–1959 David Quinlan rated the film as "mediocre" and wrote: ''Exploitative tough thriller.''
