= Terence Morgan =

English actor (1921–2005)

- as Laertes in Hamlet (1948)
- Born: 8 December 1921; Lewisham, London, England
- Died: 25 August 2005 (aged 83); Brighton, East Sussex, England
- Education: Ewell Castle School
- Occupation: Actor
- Known for: Playing Sir Francis Drake in the TV show Sir Francis Drake
- Spouse: Georgina Victoria Symondson (m. 1947 - his death)

Terence Ivor Grant Morgan (8 December 1921 – 25 August 2005) was an English actor in theatre, cinema and television. He played many "villain" roles in British film but is probably best remembered for his starring role in the TV historical adventure series Sir Francis Drake.

== Biography ==
Terence Morgan was born in Lewisham, London, the eldest child of Frederick Rowland Morgan, a "manipulative surgeon" (i.e., a bonesetter) and Muriel M Morgan (née Grant). His uncle was the character actor Verne Morgan. From 1932 to 1937, he attended Ewell Castle School, Epsom.

On leaving school, his first job was as a shipping clerk at Lloyd's of London, at a salary of £1/week. He left after winning a scholarship to RADA, graduating in 1942. On leaving RADA, he was called up into the Army's theatre unit, but after two years was invalided out (with claustrophobia), and went into rep. On 23 March 1947, he married actress Georgina Victoria Symondson (known professionally as Georgina Jumel, daughter of actress and entertainer Betty Jumel) in Westminster Register Office. They had one daughter, Lyvia Lee Morgan.

In 1948 he joined the Old Vic Company at the instigation of Laurence Olivier, and played the role of Laertes opposite Olivier in the latter's 1948 film of Hamlet. He was allegedly the first actor in such a role to get fan mail from teenage girls.

In 1951, in his third film role, he played a supporting role in Captain Horatio Hornblower with Gregory Peck and Virginia Mayo. In Mandy (1952) he played the insensitive father of a deaf girl and in Encore in 1951 he played a cad risking the life of his wife. In 1953 he again played a villain in Turn the Key Softly as a crook who gets his girlfriend a prison sentence for helping him in a burglary.

More nasty roles quickly followed with Always a Bride (1953) where he played a Treasury Investigator who turns bad as well as Forbidden Cargo in 1954 as a smuggler and Tread Softly Stranger (1958) where he is an embezzler. Two films he made in 1955 saw him cast in more positive roles—in March Hare he played an impoverished aristocrat riding a horse for the Derby, and in the espionage melodrama They Can't Hang Me, (which used Sidney Torch's theme music from The Black Museum for its own Title and Incidental music), he starred as a dapper Special Branch officer charged with discovering the identity of an enemy agent. One of his nastiest roles was in 1959, The Shakedown, when he played a pornographer and blackmailer. 1960 saw him as a petty thief in Piccadilly Third Stop.

Morgan's biggest screen success came when he landed the title role in the ITV series Sir Francis Drake, but parts dried up after that as he was no longer seen as "the bad guy".

He appeared in 30 films; other notable roles included the villainous brother of the mummy (Rameses VIII) in Curse of the Mummy's Tomb (1964) and the 1967 shocker The Penthouse where he is an estate agent who is forced to watch as his girlfriend is abused by thugs. The Lifetaker in 1976 had him back as the bad guy again where as a wealthy business man he plans ritualistic revenge on his wife and her lover. In 1986 he appeared in a series, King and Castle and in 1993, The Mystery of Edwin Drood. As roles dried up, Morgan bought a small hotel in Hove, Sussex, and ran it for some years before becoming a property developer.

== Selected filmography ==
- Hamlet (1948) - Laertes
- Shadow of the Past (1950) - John Harding
- Captain Horatio Hornblower (1951) - 2nd Lt. Gerard
- Encore (1951) - Syd Cotman (segment "Gigolo and Gigolette")
- Mandy (1952) - Harry
- It Started in Paradise (1952) - Edouard
- Street Corner (1953) - Ray
- Turn the Key Softly (1953) - David
- The Steel Key (1953) - Johnny O'Flynn
- Always a Bride (1953) - Terence Winch
- Forbidden Cargo (1954) - Roger Compton
- Dance Little Lady (1954) - Mark Gordon
- Svengali (1954) - Billy Bagot
- Loves of Three Queens (1954) - Golo (segment: Il Cavaliere dell'illusione)
- They Can't Hang Me (1955) - Inspector Ralph Brown
- The March Hare (1956) - Sir Charles Hare
- It's a Wonderful World (1956) - Ray Thompson
- The Scamp (1957) - Mike Dawson
- Tread Softly Stranger (1958) - Dave Mansell
- The Flaming Sword (1958) - Captain
- The Shakedown (1960) - Augie Cortona
- Piccadilly Third Stop (1960) - Dominic
- Sir Francis Drake (1961-1962) - Sir Francis Drake
- The Curse of the Mummy's Tomb (1964) - Adam Beauchamp
- Out of the Unknown ('No Place Like Earth', episode) (1965) - Bert Foster
- The Sea Pirate (1966) - Lord Blackwood
- The Penthouse (1967) - Bruce Victor
- Hide and Seek (1972) - Ted Lawson
- The Persuaders! ('To the Death, Baby', episode) (1972) - Carl Foster
- The Lifetaker (1975) - James
