= George Minter =

English film producer

James George Minter, was a British film producer and screenwriter born in Islington, London. He established the company Renown Pictures.

== Life and career ==
James George Minter was born in England on 7 May 1911 in the inner London suburb of Islington. Little is now known about his early life but in 1939 he married Cecile Visco who was a clothing designer. The couple moved to the (then) more upmarket London district of Kensington. Minter had trained and qualified as an accountant - a skill which undoubtedly helped him progress in his career - during the years of World War Two (1939-1945) he worked in different capacities (very often uncredited) on the production of more and more movies. However, the 1940s movies with which he was concerned were only a prelude to his best loved work in the 1950s. By the late 1940s he had started his own distribution and production company called "Renown Pictures" and in 1951 Renown released "Scrooge" a highly cinematic retelling of Charles Dickens' short story "A Christmas Carol". The film starred Alastair Sim and many other stalwarts of the British stage and screen community and is proudly "Presented by George Minter".

In 1952 Minter was a producer on another adaptation of Charles Dickens' work, The Pickwick Papers. Minter's adaptation was the first and only live-action sound version released as a film.

Minter went on to produce numerous other films through the 1950s and 1960s - ranging from classical adaptations to comedies in the "Carry on..." series.

He died from thrombosis in London, England, on July 8, 1966, at the age of 55. Following his death, his funeral and cremation were held at the Golders Green Crematorium in Golders Green, .

== Select credits ==
- No Orchids for Miss Blandish (1948)
- Old Mother Riley's Jungle Treasure (1950),
- A Christmas Carol (1951) (Producer)
- Dance, Little Lady (1954)
- The Pickwick Papers (1952) (Producer)
- Tread Softly Stranger (1958)
