= Moulin Rouge (1952 film) =

Film by John Huston

- Theatrical release poster
- Directed by: John Huston
- Screenplay by: John Huston; Anthony Veiller
- Based on: Moulin Rouge; 1950 novel by Pierre La Mure
- Produced by: John and James Woolf
- Starring: José Ferrer; Zsa Zsa Gabor; Suzanne Flon; Colette Marchand
- Cinematography: Oswald Morris
- Edited by: Ralph Kemplen
- Music by: Georges Auric; William Engvick
- Production company: Romulus Films
- Distributed by: British Lion Films
- Release dates: 23 December 1952 (United States); 13 March 1953 (United Kingdom)
- Running time: 119 minutes
- Country: United Kingdom
- Language: English
- Budget: $1.1 million
- Box office: $9 million

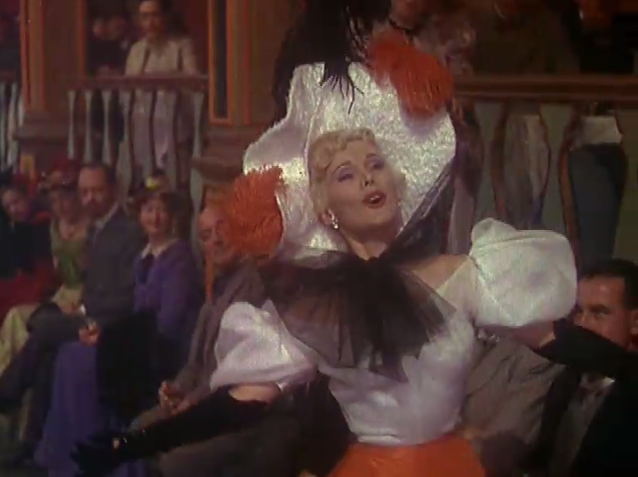
Zsa Zsa Gabor in Moulin Rouge (1952); costume design by Elsa Schiaparelli.

Moulin Rouge is a 1952 British historical romantic drama film directed by John Huston from a screenplay he co-wrote with Anthony Veiller, based on the 1950 novel of the same name by Pierre La Mure, and produced by John and James Woolf. The film follows artist Henri de Toulouse-Lautrec as he navigates the bohemian subculture of 19th-century Paris, centered around the Moulin Rouge, a burlesque venue. It was screened at the 14th Venice International Film Festival, where it won the Silver Lion.

The film stars José Ferrer, Zsa Zsa Gabor, Suzanne Flon, Eric Pohlmann, Colette Marchand, Christopher Lee, Peter Cushing, Katherine Kath, Theodore Bikel, and Muriel Smith.

== Plot ==
In 1890 Paris, crowds gather at the Moulin Rouge as artist Henri de Toulouse-Lautrec finishes a bottle of cognac while sketching the dancers. Regular patrons arrive: singer Jane Avril teases Henri, dancers La Goulue and Aicha argue, and owner Maurice Joyant offers Henri free drinks for a promotional poster. After closing, Henri reveals his 4-foot-6-inch (137 cm) stature. A flashback shows that, as a child, he injured his legs in a fall, which never healed due to a genetic disorder from his parents being first cousins.

On his way home to Montmartre, Henri helps streetwalker Marie Charlet escape the police. Impressed by her lack of judgment about his disability, Henri allows her to stay with him. He soon realizes poverty has made her both harsh and free from societal hypocrisy. After a night out, she insults a portrait he painted of her, and he throws her out, sinking into alcoholism. His landlady Madame Louet contacts his mother Countess Adele, who urges him to find Marie to lift his spirits. Henri finds her drunk in a café, where she admits she stayed with him only to save money for her boyfriend, who has now left her. Depressed, Henri returns home and contemplates suicide but finds sudden inspiration to complete the Moulin Rouge poster. Surviving his crisis, he arranges for Marie to receive money for a new life.

Henri delivers the poster to Maurice, who accepts it despite its unconventional style. His success grows, but one of his risqué portraits leads his father to denounce his work. Henri continues depicting Parisian nightlife, gaining fame but few friends. One day, he meets a young woman, Myriamme Hyam, on the Pont Alexandre III, seemingly about to jump into the Seine. She assures him she is not suicidal and throws a key into the river. Later, while shopping with Jane, Henri recognizes Myriamme modeling gowns. A friend of Jane's, she lives independently. Henri is surprised when Myriamme reveals she bought his portrait of Marie at a flea market. The key Myriamme discarded belonged to a suitor, Marcel de la Voisier, who wanted her as a lover but refused to marry her. Though cynical about love, Henri begins to fall in love with her.

One evening, Henri and Myriamme encounter La Goulue, now a washed-up, drunken figure, and Henri realizes the Moulin Rouge has become respectable. Myriamme informs Henri that Marcel has proposed. Henri bitterly congratulates her. When she asks if he loves her, Henri lies and says he does not, believing she is toying with his feelings. The next day, Henri receives a letter from Myriamme, confessing her love and that his bitterness has ruined their chance at happiness. He rushes to her apartment, but she has already left.

A year later, Henri, now an alcoholic, is found drunk in a dive bar, still obsessed with Myriamme's letter. Taken home, he suffers from delirium tremens and hallucinates cockroaches. While trying to fend them off, he falls down the stairs. Taken to his family's chateau, his condition worsens. On his deathbed, Henri's father informs him he will be the first living artist to be exhibited in the Louvre and begs for forgiveness. In his final moments, Henri envisions figures from his Moulin Rouge paintings dancing around his room.

== Cast ==
- José Ferrer as Henri de Toulouse-Lautrec / Comte Alphonse de Toulouse-Lautrec
- Zsa Zsa Gabor as Jane Avril
- Colette Marchand as Marie Charlet
- Suzanne Flon as Myriamme Hyam
- Claude Nollier as Countess Adele de Toulouse-Lautrec
- Katherine Kath as La Goulue
- Muriel Smith as Aicha and as ghost singer for Zsa Zsa Gabor (uncredited)
- Mary Clare as Madame Louet
- Lee Montague as Maurice Joyant
- Walter Crisham as Valentin le Cesosse
- Theodore Bikel as King Milan IV of Serbia
- Peter Cushing as Marcel de la Voisier
- Christopher Lee as Georges Seurat
- Michael Balfour as Dodo
- Eric Pohlmann as Picard
- Arthur Howard as Dancing Master (uncredited)

== Production ==
Producers John and James Woolf had made The African Queen with John Huston and were looking for another movie to make with the director. They showed him the novel Moulin Rouge by Pierre La Mure and suggested José Ferrer could play the lead; Huston agreed if Ferrer wanted to do it. Ferrer, who had once considered adapting the novel as a play, agreed. The Woolfs and Huston also agreed to make Beat the Devil. United Artists were originally meant to distribute, and cover the costs of the stars, director and script. However, United Artists pulled out. A syndicate was formed to finance the short fall, Moulin Productions, with distribution from Allied Artists. Members of the syndicate included Walter Mirisch and Elliot Hyman. Ferrer refused to make the film if Allied Artists distributed. United Artists then became involved again under new management.

The final budget was £434,264 plus $160,000 to cover the fees of Huston, Ferrer and Zsa Zsa Gabor. Huston claimed if the film was made in Hollywood it would have cost at least $3 million.

In the film, Ferrer portrays both Henri de Toulouse-Lautrec and his father, the Comte Alphonse de Toulouse-Lautrec. To transform Ferrer into Henri de Toulouse-Lautrec, various techniques were employed, including the use of platforms, concealed pits, special camera angles, makeup, and costumes. Short body doubles were also utilized. Ferrer designed and used a set of knee pads that allowed him to walk on his knees, simulating Henri de Toulouse-Lautrec's distinctly shorter stature. Ferrer received significant praise not only for his performance but also for his willingness to have his legs strapped in this manner for the role.

It was reported that Huston asked cinematographer Oswald Morris to render the color scheme of the film to look "as if Toulouse-Lautrec had directed it". Moulin Rouge was shot in three-strip Technicolor. The Technicolor projection print is created by dye transfer from three primary-color gelatin matrices. This permits great flexibility in controlling the density, contrast, and saturation of the print. Huston asked Technicolor for a subdued palette, rather than the sometimes-gaudy colors "glorious Technicolor" was famous for. Technicolor was reportedly reluctant to do this.

The film was shot at Shepperton Studios, Shepperton, Surrey, England, and on location in London and Paris. It took place in July and August 1952.

The movie marked the film debut of Maureen Swanson.

John Huston later commented:

All of my interest in art, which I discovered before I became a film-maker, served me well when it came to recreating the world of Toulouse-Lautrec. The picture, looking at it now, is physically, I think, very beautiful. The movement of the picture is excellent. So far as the character of Lautrec is concerned, well, Jose Ferrer played him admirably, I thought, though we weren't able to do the artist justice. We wouldn't tell that story now... There was a sentimental turn to the film that, if anything, I think would have offended the painter himself, who was clinically detached.

Ferrer said the film "didn’t avoid or sidestep anything. John took a book about a man who fell in love with a woman who said, ‘Get away, you're ugly and weird,’ and who then hung around with prostitutes because he could buy their love. John did make it explicit. It was a whorehouse; he was an alcoholic. If the ending was sentimental, John was very proud of it. I don’t know what truth was avoided.”

The movie was the subject of numerous lawsuits.

== Reception ==
=== Critical ===
The Monthly Film Bulletin wrote: "This long and pretentious film is, like Pierre La Mure's book, not an accurate biography of Lautrec, but an attempt to evoke the kind of man he was and to paint a vivid fresco of his period and background. ...The dialogue, with its attempts at smart and worldly wise aphorisms, the deadly even pace and unrelenting detachment add up only to two hours of innate boredom, relieved from time to time by some striking effects of colour. The sets, costumes and photography are, indeed, on a much higher level than the rest; there are moments when the surface achieves a fine visual approximation of Lautrec's Paris, and as a result of which the vulgarity of the treatment appears all the more discordant. The acting is chiefly remarkable for a constant babel of foreign accents, among which the most extraordinary are Zsa Zsa Gabor's high-pitched Viennese exclamations."

Variety called it "standout all the way, and inherent b.o. values are sturdy for key-city situations."

=== Box office ===
During its first year of release it earned £205,453 in UK cinemas and grossed $9 million at the North American box office.

According to the National Film Finance Corporation, the film made a comfortable profit.

Ferrer received 40 per cent of the proceeds from the film as well as other rights. This remuneration gave rise to a prominent U.S. Second Circuit tax case, Commissioner v. Ferrer (1962), in which Ferrer argued that he was taxed too much.

John Huston said he made more money from this film than any other. "The producers were unscrupulously honest; instead of trying to conceal profits, they took pleasure in giving me my dues."

=== Accolades ===
Award	Category	Nominee(s)	Result	Ref.
Academy Awards	Best Motion Picture	John Huston	Nominated	
Academy Awards	Best Director	John Huston	Nominated	
Academy Awards	Best Actor	José Ferrer	Nominated	
Academy Awards	Best Supporting Actress	Colette Marchand	Nominated	
Academy Awards	Best Art Direction – Color	Art Direction: Paul Sheriff; Set Decoration: Marcel Vertès	Won	
Academy Awards	Best Costume Design – Color	Marcel Vertès	Won	
Academy Awards	Best Film Editing	Ralph Kemplen	Nominated	
British Academy Film Awards	Best Film from any Source		Nominated	
British Academy Film Awards	Best British Film		Nominated	
British Academy Film Awards	Most Promising Newcomer to Film	Colette Marchand	Nominated	
British Society of Cinematographers Awards	Best Cinematography in a Theatrical Feature Film	Oswald Morris	Won	
Golden Globe Awards	Most Promising Newcomer – Female	Colette Marchand	Won	
National Board of Review Awards	Top Foreign Films		2nd Place	
Venice Film Festival	Golden Lion	John Huston	Nominated	
Venice Film Festival	Silver Lion	John Huston	Won	
Writers Guild of America Awards	Best Written American Drama	Anthony Veiller and John Huston	Nominated	

The film was not nominated for its color cinematography, which many critics found remarkable. Leonard Maltin, in his annual Movie and Video Guide declared: "If you can't catch this in color, skip it."

In an interview shortly after his successful film version of Cabaret opened, Bob Fosse acknowledged John Huston's filming of the can-can in Moulin Rouge as being very influential on his own film style.

The Moulin Rouge theme song became well known and made it onto the record industry charts.

The film was nominated for inclusion on the American Film Institute list of 100 Greatest Film Scores, but was not included on the final list.

== Digital restoration ==
The film was digitally restored by FotoKem for Blu-ray debut. Frame-by-frame digital restoration was done by Prasad Corporation removing dirt, tears, scratches and other defects. In April 2019, a restored version of the film from The Film Foundation, Park Circus, Romulus Films, and MGM was selected to be shown in the Cannes Classics section at the 2019 Cannes Film Festival.

== See also ==
- Moulin Rouge, 1928 film
- Moulin Rouge, 1934 film
- Moulin Rouge!, 2001 film
