= Jack Popplewell =

English writer and playwright (1909–1996)

Jack Popplewell (22 March 1909 – 16 November 1996) was an English writer and playwright.

== Life ==
Popplewell was born and grew up in Leeds, West Riding of Yorkshire. He published his first song in 1940, and his first play, Blind Alley was staged in London in 1953. Blind Alley opened to positive reviews, and was later adapted to the cinema in Tread Softly Stranger, released in 1958, and starring Diana Dors and George Baker. Popplewell owned Manor Farm, Churwell, Leeds, where he farmed rhubarb, later moving with his wife, Betty, and two daughters (Juliet and Vanessa) to Vaynol Gate, Morley, West Yorkshire. He died in Bath.

== Plays ==
Many were premiered in London's West End.

- Blind Alley. Premiere at "Q” Theatre, Kew Bridge, London, 1953. Published Samuel French, 1953.
- Dead on Nine. West End premiere at Westminster Theatre, 1955, starring Griffith Jones, Hy Hazel and Andrew Cruickshank. Published Samuel French, 1956.
- The Vanity Case. Premiere Oldham, England, 1957. Published Evans, 1957.
- Dear Delinquent. West End premiere at Westminster theatre, 1957, starring David Tomlinson, Anna Massey and Patrick Cargill. Published Evans, 1958.
- A Day in the Life of . . . West End premiere at Savoy Theatre, 1958, starring Naunton Wayne and Alfred Marks. Published Evans, 1959.
- Breakfast in bed. Premiere Bradford, England, 1957. Published Evans, 1958.
- And Suddenly It's Spring. West End premiere at Duke of York's Theatre, 1959, starring Frank Lawton, Yolande Donlan and Margaret Lockwood. Published Samuel French, 1959).
- The Last Word. Premiere Edinburgh, 1958. Published Samuel French, 1960.
- Hocus-Pocus. Premiere Eastbourne, England, 1961. Published Samuel French, 1961.
- Careful Rapture. Published Samuel French, 1961.
- Tale from the Vienna Woods. Published Samuel French, 1961.
- Policy for Murder. West End premiere at Duke of York's Theatre, 1962, starring John Slater, Dermot Walsh and Heather Chasen. Published Samuel French, 1963.
- Every Other Evening. West End premiere at Phoenix Theatre, 1964, starring Derek Farr and Margaret Lockwood. Adapted from Francois Campaux. Published Samuel French, 1965.
- Busybody. West End premiere at Duke of York's Theatre, 1964, starring Irene Handl. Published Samuel French 1965.
- Dear Children. Premiere Canterbury, England, 1966. Published Samuel French, 1967.
- Mother's Day Out. Published Samuel French, 1967.
- Dead Easy. West End premiere at St Martin's Theatre, 1974, starring Irene Handl. Published Samuel French, 1975.
- Darling I'm Home. West End premiere at Windsor Theatre, 1970. Published Samuel French, 1976.
- High Infidelity. Premiered on tour, 1981. Published Samuel French, 1982.

Unpublished plays include Boomerang (Premiered Sheffield, England 1964), How do you spell Mississippi? and The Queen's Favourites (1975). Popplewell also adapted Harold Brighouse's Hobson's Choice into a musical.

== Music ==
Popplewell published over 40 songs, recorded by, amongst others, Vera Lynn, Gracie Fields, Bing Crosby, Geraldo, Anne Shelton with Ambrose (bandleader) and his Orchestra, and Beniamino Gigli. He collaborated frequently with Michael Carr, also from Leeds. His first published song, If I Should Fall in Love Again was winner of the News Chronicle song contest in 1940. Other titles include My Girl's an Irish Girl recorded by Bing Crosby, and Tonight Beloved recorded by Gigli.

Published songs:

- If I Should Fall in Love Again, music and words Popplewell.
- Until You Fall in Love, credited as music Popplewell, words Michael Carr.
- Ev'ry Time I Look at You, music Michael Carr, words Popplewell.
- The First Lullaby, music Michael Carr, words Popplewell.
- The Day I Met His Majesty the King, music Michael Carr, words Popplewell.
- You're in my Arms (and a million miles away), music Michael Carr, words Popplewell.
- Caballero on the Rio Grande, music Michael Carr, words Popplewell.
- In Old Mexico, music Michael Carr, words Popplewell.
- There's a Cowboy Ridin' Thru' the Sky, music Michael Carr, words Popplewell.
- My Silly Old Cowpoke Grandpa, music Michael Carr, words Popplewell
- Only You, music Vincent Scotto, words Popplewell.
- Mistletoe Kiss, music Michael Carr, words Popplewell.
- Really and Truly, music Michael Carr, words Popplewell.
- With all my Heart, music Reginald King, words Popplewell.
- After the Rain, music Bert Reisfeld, words Popplewell.
- Can't You See the Silver Lining? music Michael Carr, words Popplewell.
- One Love, music and words Popplewell.
- Do You Ever Dream of Tomorrow (like I do)? music and words Popplewell.
- My Girl's an Irish Girl, music and words Popplewell.
- Song of Paradise, music Reginald King, words Popplewell.
- In old Santa Fe, music Stolz, words Popplewell.
- No More (based on La Paloma), music Sebastián Yradier, adapted Popplewell.
- Wonderful, music Michon, words Popplewell.
- Esmeralda, music and words Popplewell.
- Tonight Beloved (Ritorna Amore), music Manli di Veroli, words Popplewell.
- Coronation Bells, music TW Partridge, words John Bull, pseudonym of Popplewell, Parsons and Phillips.
- If There is a Mountain, music Popplewell, words Popplewell and John Turner.
- Ivy, music and words Popplewell.

== Film and television ==
Vera Lynn featured Popplewell's songs in her wartime movies; We'll Meet Again (1942) (After the Rain), Rhythm Serenade (1943) (With All My Heart), and One Exciting Night (1944) (One Love). The film Tread Softly Stranger (UK, 1958) was based on Blind Alley.

Busybody has been translated onto the big screen in Denmark (1969) and Norway (1970):

- Mordskab, directed by Bent Christensen (Denmark, 1969)
- Skulle det dukke opp flere lik, er det bare å ringe …, directed by Knut Bohwim (Norway, 1970)

In Germany, Busybody was brought to stage under the titles Frau Pieper lebt gefährlich and Keine Leiche ohne Lily. It has also been translated into Low German for Hamburg's Ohnsorg Theater, where Popplewell's play How Do You Spell Mississippi? was also brought to stage in Low German.

Dead on Nine was adapted for television as an episode of the Kraft Mystery Theater (USA, 1959), and Popplewell wrote the screenplay, Born Every Minute, for an episode of Comedy Playhouse (UK, 1972). Television versions of other stage plays by Popplewell have been broadcast in Germany, France, Belgium, Austria, Hungary and Russia.
