= John Lemont =

Canadian film director (1914–2004)

John Lemont (1914–2004) was a Canadian-born film and television director. He worked primarily in British television from 1954 to 1962, directing such TV series as Sir Francis Drake, Sixpenny Corner and The Errol Flynn Theater among others. He is known to science-fiction film fans as the director of the 1961 Herman Cohen film Konga.

== Selected filmography ==
- The Green Carnation (1954)
- The Shakedown (1960)
- And Women Shall Weep (1960) Lemont co-wrote the script
- The Frightened City (1961) starred Herbert Lom and Sean Connery
- Konga (1961) produced in England by Herman Cohen
