= List of British films of 1962 =

A list of films produced in the United Kingdom in 1962 (see 1962 in film):

== 1962 ==
Title	Director	Cast	Genre	Notes
1962
All Night Long	Basil Dearden	Patrick McGoohan, Richard Attenborough, Paul Harris	Drama	Updated retelling of Othello
Ambush in Leopard Street	J. Henry Piperno	James Kenney, Michael Brennan	Crime	
The Amorous Prawn	Anthony Kimmins	Ian Carmichael, Joan Greenwood, Cecil Parker	Comedy	
Band of Thieves	Peter Bezencenet	Acker Bilk, Geoffrey Sumner, Jennifer Jayne	Musical	
The Barber of Stamford Hill	Caspar Wrede	John Bennett, Megs Jenkins, Maxwell Shaw	Drama	
Billy Budd	Peter Ustinov	Terence Stamp, Robert Ryan, Melvyn Douglas	Drama	BAFTA nominations
Boy and Bicycle	Ridley Scott	Tony Scott	Short film	Not shown in theatres until 1997
The Boys	Sidney J. Furie	Richard Todd, Robert Morley	Crime	
The Brain	Freddie Francis	Anne Heywood, Peter van Eyck	Horror	Co-production with West Germany
Captain Clegg	Peter Graham Scott	Peter Cushing, Yvonne Romain, Oliver Reed	Horror	
Carry On Cruising	Gerald Thomas	Sid James, Kenneth Williams, Liz Fraser	Comedy	
Crooks Anonymous	Ken Annakin	Leslie Phillips, Stanley Baxter, Julie Christie	Comedy	
Crosstrap	Robert Hartford-Davis	Laurence Payne, Jill Adams, Zena Marshall	Crime	
The Damned	Joseph Losey	Macdonald Carey, Shirley Anne Field, Viveca Lindfors, Alexander Knox, Oliver Reed	Horror	
Danger by My Side	Charles Saunders	Anthony Oliver, Maureen Connell	Crime	
The Day of the Triffids	Steve Sekely	Howard Keel, Kieron Moore, Janette Scott	Sci-fi	
Dead Man's Evidence	Francis Searle	Conrad Phillips, Jane Griffiths	Drama	
The Devil's Agent	John Paddy Carstairs	Peter van Eyck, Marianne Koch	Drama	
Dilemma	Peter Maxwell	Ingrid Hafner, Peter Halliday	Thriller	
Dr. No	Terence Young	Sean Connery, Joseph Wiseman, Ursula Andress	Spy/action	The first James Bond film; Number 41 in the list of BFI Top 100 British films
Don't Talk to Strange Men	Pat Jackson	Christina Gregg, Janina Faye, Cyril Raymond	Crime/drama	
Emergency	Francis Searle	Glyn Houston, Zena Walker	Drama	
The Fast Lady	Ken Annakin	Stanley Baxter, Julie Christie	Comedy	
Fate Takes a Hand	Max Varnel	Ronald Howard, Christina Gregg	Drama	
The Fur Collar	Lawrence Huntington	John Bentley, Martin Benson	Thriller	
Gaolbreak	Francis Searle	Peter Reynolds, Avice Landone	Drama	
Go to Blazes	Michael Truman	Dave King, Robert Morley, Dennis Price	Comedy	
The Golden Rabbit	David MacDonald	Timothy Bateson, Willoughby Goddard	Comedy	
Guns of Darkness	Anthony Asquith	David Niven, Leslie Caron	Drama	
H.M.S. Defiant	Lewis Gilbert	Alec Guinness, Dirk Bogarde	Drama	released under the title Damn the Defiant! in the U.S.
Hair of the Dog	Terry Bishop	Reginald Beckwith, Dorinda Stevens, John Le Mesurier	Comedy	
I Thank a Fool	Robert Stevens	Susan Hayward, Peter Finch, Diane Cilento	Crime drama	
In the Doghouse	Darcy Conyers	Leslie Phillips, Peggy Cummins	Comedy	
The Inspector	Philip Dunne	Stephen Boyd, Dolores Hart, Hugh Griffith	Drama	Co-production with US
The Iron Maiden	Gerald Thomas	Michael Craig, Anne Helm, Jeff Donnell	Comedy	
It's Trad, Dad!	Richard Lester	Helen Shapiro, Craig Douglas	Musical	released under the title Ring-A-Ding Rhythm in the U.S.
Jigsaw	Val Guest	Jack Warner, Ronald Lewis	Crime	
Kill or Cure	George Pollock	Terry-Thomas, Eric Sykes	Comedy	
A Kind of Loving	John Schlesinger	Alan Bates, June Ritchie, Thora Hird	Drama	Golden Bear winner at Berlin
The L-Shaped Room	Bryan Forbes	Leslie Caron, Tom Bell	Drama	
Lawrence of Arabia	David Lean	Peter O'Toole	Historical Biography	Number 3 in the list of BFI Top 100 British films; winner of seven Academy Awards
Life for Ruth	Basil Dearden	Michael Craig, Patrick McGoohan	Drama	
Live Now – Pay Later	Jay Lewis	Ian Hendry, June Ritchie	Thriller	
Locker Sixty-Nine	Norman Harrison	Eddie Byrne, Paul Daneman, Edward Underdown	Crime	
Lolita	Stanley Kubrick	James Mason, Shelley Winters, Sue Lyon	Drama/romance	
The Loneliness of the Long Distance Runner	Tony Richardson	Tom Courtenay, Michael Redgrave, Alec McCowen	Drama	Number 61 in the list of BFI Top 100 British films
The Main Attraction	Daniel Petrie	Pat Boone, Nancy Kwan	Drama	
Masters of Venus	Ernest Morris	Norman Wooland, Mandy Harper	Sci-fi	Serial film
Mix Me a Person	Leslie Norman	Anne Baxter, Donald Sinden, Adam Faith	Crime/drama	
Mrs. Gibbons' Boys	Max Varnel	Kathleen Harrison, Lionel Jeffries	Comedy	
Night of the Eagle	Sidney Hayers	Peter Wyngarde, Janet Blair	Horror	
Night of the Prowler	Francis Searle	Patrick Holt, Colette Wilde	Thriller	
On the Beat	Robert Asher	Norman Wisdom, Raymond Huntley	Comedy	
Only Two Can Play	Sidney Gilliat	Peter Sellers, Mai Zetterling	Comedy	
Operation Snatch	Robert Day	Terry-Thomas, George Sanders	Comedy	
Our Man in the Caribbean		Carlos Thompson, Diana Rigg, Tracy Reed, Shirley Eaton	Action	Television episodes of The Sentimental Agent pieced together
Out of the Fog	Montgomery Tully	David Sumner, Susan Travers	Crime	
The Painted Smile	Lance Comfort	Liz Fraser, Kenneth Griffith	Thriller	
A Pair of Briefs	Ralph Thomas	Michael Craig, Mary Peach	Comedy	
The Password Is Courage	Andrew L. Stone	Dirk Bogarde, Maria Perschy, Alfred Lynch	World War II	
The Phantom of the Opera	Terence Fisher	Herbert Lom, Heather Sears, Michael Gough	Horror	
The Pirates of Blood River	John Gilling	Kerwin Mathews, Glenn Corbett, Christopher Lee	Action	
Playback	Quentin Lawrence	Margit Saad, Barry Foster, Nigel Green	Crime	
Play It Cool	Michael Winner	Billy Fury, Dennis Price	Musical	
The Playboy of the Western World	Brian Desmond Hurst	Gary Raymond, Siobhán McKenna	Comedy	
Postman's Knock	Robert Lynn	Spike Milligan, Barbara Shelley	Comedy	
The Pot Carriers	Peter Graham Scott	Ronald Fraser, Paul Massie	Comedy	
Private Potter	Casper Wrede	Tom Courtenay, Mogens Wieth	Drama	
A Prize of Arms	Cliff Owen	Stanley Baker, Tom Bell	Crime	
The Quare Fellow	Arthur Dreifuss	Patrick McGoohan, Sylvia Syms	Drama	
Reach for Glory	Philip Leacock	Harry Andrews, Kay Walsh	Drama	
The Road to Hong Kong	Norman Panama	Bob Hope, Bing Crosby, Joan Collins	Comedy	
Serena	Peter Maxwell	Patrick Holt, Emrys Jones, Honor Blackman	Crime	
She Knows Y'Know	Montgomery Tully	Hylda Baker, Cyril Smith	Comedy	
She'll Have to Go	Robert Asher	Bob Monkhouse, Alfred Marks	Comedy	
Solo for Sparrow	Gordon Flemyng	Yvonne Buckingham, Michael Caine	Crime	
Some People	Clive Donner	Kenneth More, Ray Brooks	Drama	
The Spanish Sword	Ernest Morris	Ronald Howard, June Thorburn	Adventure	
Station Six-Sahara	Seth Holt	Carroll Baker, Ian Bannen	Drama	
Stork Talk	Michael Forlong	Tony Britton, Anne Heywood	Comedy	
Stranglehold	Lawrence Huntington	Macdonald Carey, Barbara Shelley	Action	
Strongroom	Vernon Sewell	Derren Nesbitt, Colin Gordon, Ann Lynn	Crime drama	
Tarnished Heroes	Ernest Morris	Dermot Walsh, Anton Rodgers	War	
Tarzan Goes to India	John Guillermin	Jock Mahoney, Leo Gordon	Adventure	Co-production with Switzerland and US
Term of Trial	Peter Glenville	Laurence Olivier, Simone Signoret	Drama	
Three Spare Wives	Ernest Morris	Susan Stephen, John Hewer	Comedy	
Tiara Tahiti	Ted Kotcheff	James Mason, John Mills	Comedy/drama	
Trial and Error	James Hill	Peter Sellers, Richard Attenborough	Comedy	Also known as The Dock Brief
Twice Round the Daffodils	Gerald Thomas	Juliet Mills, Donald Sinden	Comedy/drama	
Two and Two Make Six	Freddie Francis	George Chakiris, Janette Scott	Comedy	
Two Letter Alibi	Robert Lynn	Peter Williams, Petra Davies	Crime	
The Valiant	Roy Ward Baker	John Mills, Ettore Manni	War	
Village of Daughters	George Pollock	Eric Sykes, John Le Mesuirier	Comedy	
The Waltz of the Toreadors	John Guillermin	Peter Sellers, Dany Robin	Comedy	
The War Lover	Philip Leacock	Steve McQueen, Robert Wagner	War	
We Joined the Navy	Wendy Toye	Kenneth More, Lloyd Nolan	Comedy	
What Every Woman Wants	Ernest Morris	William Fox, Hy Hazell	Comedy	
The Wild and the Willing	Ralph Thomas	Virginia Maskell, Ian McShane	Drama	

== See also ==
- 1962 in British music
- 1962 in British radio
- 1962 in British television
- 1962 in the United Kingdom
