= 1962 in British radio =

This is a list of events from British radio in 1962.

== Events ==
=== January ===
- 29 January – The Oxford transmitting station at Beckley begins relaying BBC radio and television.

=== February to May ===
- No events.

=== June ===
- 27 June – The Pilkington Committee on Broadcasting publishes its report, recommending that the BBC should extend its activities to the creation of local radio stations to forestall the introduction of commercial radio. In 1962 the BBC runs a series of closed circuit experiments in local radio from a variety of locations across England.

=== July ===
- No events.

=== August ===
- 28 August – The BBC begins experimental stereo radio broadcasts.

=== September ===
- No events.

=== October ===
- 30 October – The comedy The Men from the Ministry starring Richard Murdoch is first aired on the BBC Light Programme.

=== November ===
- No events.

=== December ===
- 23 December – David Jacobs presents Pick of the Pops for the final time.

== Programme debuts ==
- October –
  - The Men from the Ministry on the BBC Light Programme (1962–1977)
  - Ted Ray and... on the BBC Light Programme (October–December)

== Continuing radio programmes ==
=== 1940s ===
- Music While You Work (1940–1967)
- Sunday Half Hour (1940–2018)
- Desert Island Discs (1942–Present)
- Family Favourites (1945–1980)
- Down Your Way (1946–1992)
- Have A Go (1946–1967)
- Housewives' Choice (1946–1967)
- Letter from America (1946–2004)
- Woman's Hour (1946–Present)
- Twenty Questions (1947–1976)
- Any Questions? (1948–Present)
- Mrs Dale's Diary (1948–1969)
- Billy Cotton Band Show (1949–1968)
- A Book at Bedtime (1949–Present)

=== 1950s ===
- The Archers (1950–Present)
- Listen with Mother (1950–1982)
- From Our Own Correspondent (1955–Present)
- Pick of the Pops (1955–Present)
- The Clitheroe Kid (1957–1972)
- My Word! (1957–1988)
- Test Match Special (1957–Present)
- The Today Programme (1957–Present)
- The Navy Lark (1959–1977)
- Sing Something Simple (1959–2001)
- Your Hundred Best Tunes (1959–2007)

=== 1960s ===
- Farming Today (1960–Present)
- Easy Beat (1960–1967)
- In Touch (1961–Present)

== Ending this year ==
- January – Once Over Lightly on the BBC Light Programme (1961–1962)
- 19 May – Variety Playhouse on the BBC Home Service (1953–1962)

== Births ==
- 25 January – Emma Freud, broadcaster, script editor and cultural commentator
- 27 January – Adrian Allen, radio personality
- 13 February – Hugh Dennis, comedian
- 21 February – Vanessa Feltz, television personality, broadcaster and journalist
- 18 March – Bob Shennan, radio executive, Controller of BBC Radio 2 from 2009
- 26 March – Richard Coles, musician, journalist and Church of England priest
- May – Terry Christian, radio and television presenter
- 6 June – Sarah Parkinson, producer and writer of radio and television programmes (died 2003)
- 15 June – Chris Morris, satirist
- 27 June – Michael Ball, actor, singer and radio and TV presenter
- 15 July – Iain Dale, political writer and broadcaster
- July – Kirsty Lang, journalist and presenter
- 15 September – Steve Punt, comedian
- 12 November
  - Mariella Frostrup, Norwegian-born broadcast presenter
  - Mark Porter, television and radio presenter and GP
- 17 November – Alice Arnold, newsreader and continuity announcer
- 10 December – Dixie Peach, Radio DJ, and musician
- 16 December – Ian Payne, radio and television sports broadcaster
- 30 December – Kevin Greening, radio presenter, host of the Radio 1 breakfast show from 1997 to 1998 (died 2007)
- Unknown
  - Jack Docherty, Scottish-born comedian
  - Torquil Riley-Smith, founder of LBH, Britain's first gay radio station

== See also ==
- 1962 in British music
- 1962 in British television
- 1962 in the United Kingdom
- List of British films of 1962
