= 1962 in British television =

This is a list of British television related events from 1962.

== Events ==
=== January ===
- 2 January – Z-Cars premieres on BBC TV, noted as a realistic portrayal of the police. Unusually for its time, the series is set in Northern England; most BBC dramas have been set in southern England. The first three series are transmitted live.
- 4 January – The ITV Anglia region starts showing the American science fiction horror anthology series The Twilight Zone, over a year before other ITV regions.
- 29 January – The Oxford transmitting station at Beckley begins relaying BBC radio and television.

=== March ===
- 18 March – "Un premier amour", sung by Isabelle Aubret (music by Claude-Henri Vic, lyrics by Roland Stephane Valade), wins the Eurovision Song Contest 1962 (staged in Luxembourg) for France, broadcast in Britain by the BBC. The UK entry is "Ring-a-Ding Girl", sung by Ronnie Carroll in the first of two consecutive appearances in the contest, in which he finishes in fourth place.

=== April ===
- 13 April – The Johnny Morris-presented children's series Animal Magic debuts on BBC TV.
- 17 April – Legal sitcom Brothers in Law premieres on BBC TV, starring Richard Briers.

=== May ===
- 16 May – BBC1 debuts the American cartoon series Top Cat; however, a few weeks later the BBC change the title to The Boss Cat to avoid similarities with a cat food brand of the same name.

=== June ===
- 14 June – BBC Television broadcasts the first episode of the sitcom Steptoe and Son, written by Galton and Simpson and starring Wilfrid Brambell and Harry H. Corbett, an unusual use at this time of "straight" actors in a sitcom; it is based on a one-off show "The Offer" in the Galton & Simpson's Comedy Playhouse strand.

=== July ===
- 1 July – Police 5 premieres on ITV, featuring appeals to the public to assist in solving real crimes.
- 11 July (01:00 GMT) – First live transatlantic television transmission, via the Telstar communications satellite and Goonhilly Satellite Earth Station, is received in the United Kingdom and broadcast by the BBC. An error at the ground station causes the initial images to be of poor quality. A full public broadcast is made on 23 July.

=== September ===
- 1 September – Channel Television, the ITV franchise for the Channel Islands, goes on air.
- 14 September – Wales West and North Television (Teledu Cymru) goes on air to the North and West Wales region, extending ITV to the whole of the United Kingdom.
- 21 September – First broadcast of the long-running television quiz programme University Challenge, made by Granada Television with Bamber Gascoigne as quizmaster.
- 22 September – Anglia Television launches Match of the Week which shows highlights of football matches from around East Anglia. Shortly after, Tyne Tees Television in the North East of England begins broadcasting local matches under the title Shoot.

=== October ===
- 4 October – The Saint premieres on ITV, with Roger Moore in the title role as The Saint (Simon Templar).
- 17 October – Irish broadcaster Gay Byrne becomes the first person to introduce The Beatles on television, as the band makes its small-screen debut on Granada Television's local news programme People and Places, in the north of England.
- 21 October – The American Folk Blues Festival in Manchester is filmed, and shown in two parts of ITV's arts series Tempo.

=== November ===
- 24 November – The first episode of the satire show That Was The Week That Was is broadcast live on BBC Television, presented by David Frost and produced by Ned Sherrin.

=== December ===
- 21 December – ITV London begins to show the Hanna-Barbera cartoon series The Yogi Bear Show.
- 25 December – ITV London shows the 1951 Christmas film Scrooge, starring Alistair Sim.

=== Unknown ===
- Cigarette adverts are banned from children's programmes in the UK. Actors in these adverts now have to be over twenty-one and connection to social success is no longer allowed. The tobacco companies also start a policy of not advertising before 9pm.

== Debuts ==
=== BBC Television Service/BBC TV ===
- 2 January
  - Compact (1962–1965)
  - Z-Cars (1962–1978)
- 7 January – Oliver Twist (1962)
- 8 January – Crying Down the Lane (1962)
- 22 January – Studio 4 (1962)
- 2 February – Corrigan Blake (1962–1963)
- 19 February – Barbara in Black (1962)
- 10 March – The Six Proud Walkers (1962)
- 8 April – Stranger in the City (1962)
- 13 April – Animal Magic (1962–1983)
- 14 April – Mr. Pastry's Progress (1962)
- 17 April – Brothers in Law (1962)
- 30 April – Suspense (1962–1963)
- 16 May – Boss Cat (UK title of US Top Cat; 1961–1962)
- 21 May – The Franchise Affair (1962)
- 26 May – William (1962–1963)
- 27 May – The Master of Ballantrae (1962)
- 9 June – The Big Pull (1962)
- 14 June – Steptoe and Son (1962–1965, 1970, 1972–1974)
- 22 June – Climate of Fear (1962)
- 28 June – The Andromeda Breakthrough (1962)
- 8 July – The Dark Island (1962)
- 17 July – Hugh and I (1962–1968)
- 21 July – Outbreak of Murder (1962)
- 7 August – Silent Evidence (1962)
- 16 August
  - Dr. Finlay's Casebook (1962–1971)
  - Katy (1962)
- 12 September – Dial RIX (1962–1963)
- 17 September – Wales Today (1962–present)
- 3 October – Zero One (1962–1963)
- 6 October – The Last Man Out (1962)
- 14 October
  - Raise Your Glasses (1962)
  - The River Flows East (1962)
- 8 November – The Monsters (1962)
- 12 November – Top of the Form (1962–1975)
- 24 November – That Was The Week That Was (1962–1963)
- 6 December – The Largest Theatre in the World (1962; 1965; 1967; 1970–1971)

=== ITV ===
- 4 January – The Twilight Zone (1959–1964)
- 10 January – Take a Letter (1962–1964)
- 27 February – Sara and Hoppity (1962–1963)
- 4 June – Richard the Lionheart (1962–1963)
- 30 June – Out of This World (1962)
- 1 July – Police 5 (1962–1992)
- 19 September – Bulldog Breed (1962)
- 21 September – University Challenge (1962–1987 ITV, 1994–present BBC)
- 29 September
  - On the Braden Beat (1962–1967)
  - Man of the World (1962–1963)
  - Strange Concealments (1962)
  - The Sword in the Web (1962)
- 4 October – The Saint (1962–1969)
- 11 October – It's a Living (1962)
- 17 October – Kingsley Amis Goes Pop (1962)
- 25 October – What the Public Wants (1962)
- 26 October – Francie and Josie (1962–1965)
- 28 October
  - Fireball XL5 (1962–1973)
  - The New Adventures of Madeline (1962–1969)
- 17 November – City Beneath the Sea (1962)
- 28 November – Electra (1962)
- 20 December – It Happened Like This (1962–1963)
- 21 December – The Yogi Bear Show (1961–1962)

== Continuing television shows ==
=== 1920s ===
- BBC Wimbledon (1927–1939, 1946–2019, 2021–2024)

=== 1930s ===
- Trooping the Colour (1937–1939, 1946–2019, 2023–present)
- The Boat Race (1938–1939, 1946–2019, 2021–present)
- BBC Cricket (1939, 1946–1999, 2020–2024)

=== 1940s ===
- The Ed Sullivan Show (1948–1971)
- Come Dancing (1949–1998)

=== 1950s ===
- Andy Pandy (1950–1970, 2002–2005)
- Watch with Mother (1952–1975)
- Rag, Tag and Bobtail (1953–1965)
- The Good Old Days (1953–1983)
- Panorama (1953–present)
- Picture Book (1955–1965)
- Sunday Night at the London Palladium (1955–1967, 1973–1974)
- Take Your Pick! (1955–1968, 1992–1998)
- Double Your Money (1955–1968)
- Dixon of Dock Green (1955–1976)
- Crackerjack (1955–1970, 1972–1984, 2020–2021)
- ITV Wimbledon (1956–1968)
- Opportunity Knocks (1956–1978, 1987–1990)
- This Week (1956–1978, 1986–1992)
- Armchair Theatre (1956–1974)
- What the Papers Say (1956–2008)
- The Sky at Night (1957–present)
- Blue Peter (1958–present)
- Grandstand (1958–2007)
- Noggin the Nog (1959–1965, 1970, 1979–1982)

=== 1960s ===
- Sykes and A... (1960–1965)
- The Flintstones (1960–1966)
- Coronation Street (1960–present)
- Points of View (1961–present)
- Songs of Praise (1961–present)
- Ghost Squad (1961–1964)
- The Avengers (1961–1969)

== Ending this year ==
- Railway Roundabout (1958–1962)
- Mess Mates (1960–1962)
- Face to Face (1959–1962)
- Top Cat (1961–1962)
- Supercar (1961–1962)
- Sir Francis Drake (1961–1962)
- Strange Experiences (1955–1962)
- Winning Widows (1961–1962)

== Births ==
- 25 January – Emma Freud, English broadcaster and cultural commentator
- 7 February – Eddie Izzard, British actor and comedian
- 13 February – Hugh Dennis, British actor, comedian and writer (The Now Show)
- 21 February – Vanessa Feltz, British television presenter
- 17 March – Clare Grogan, Scottish actress and singer
- 1 April – Phillip Schofield, British TV presenter
- 23 April – John Hannah, Scottish actor
- 17 May
  - Craig Ferguson, Scottish actor and television presenter
  - Alan Johnston, journalist
- 6 June – Sarah Parkinson, producer and writer of radio and television programmes (died 2003)
- 15 June – Chris Morris, satirist and actor
- 19 June – Lisa Aziz, journalist and newsreader
- 25 June – Phill Jupitus, comedian and broadcaster
- 29 June – Amanda Donohoe, English actress
- 4 July – Neil Morrissey, English actor
- 24 July – Cleo Rocos, British actress (The Kenny Everett Show)
- 20 August – Sophie Aldred, British actress and television presenter
- 5 September – Peter Wingfield, Welsh actor
- 8 September – Daljit Dhaliwal, British newsreader and television presenter
- 15 September – Steve Punt, British actor, comedian and writer (The Now Show)
- 17 September – Michael French, actor
- 21 September – Nick Knowles, television presenter
- 24 September – Ally McCoist, Scottish footballer and TV pundit and A Question of Sport team captain
- 5 October – Caron Keating, British TV presenter (died 2004)
- 20 October – Boothby Graffoe, born James Rogers, English comedian, singer-songwriter and playwright
- 25 October – Nick Hancock, British actor and television presenter
- 26 October – Cary Elwes, British actor
- 12 November – Mariella Frostrup, British journalist and television presenter
- 26 November – Louise Harrison, actress and producer
- 3 December – Sarah Jarvis, General Practitioner and media personality
- 6 December – Colin Salmon, British actor
- 28 December – Kaye Adams, Scottish television presenter
- Unknown
  - Matthew Amroliwala, newsreader
  - Jack Docherty, Scottish comedian
  - Mat Fraser, actor, musician and performing artist
  - Carrie Gracie, journalist and newsreader
  - Kazia Pelka, actress

== See also ==
- 1962 in British music
- 1962 in British radio
- 1962 in the United Kingdom
- List of British films of 1962
