= 1962 United Kingdom local elections =

Elections in the United Kingdom

The 1962 United Kingdom local elections took place in 1962.

== England ==
- 1962 Altrincham Municipal Borough Council election
- 1962 Hale Urban District Council election
- 1962 Leeds City Council election
- 1962 Sale Municipal Borough Council election
- 1962 Stretford Municipal Borough Council election
- 1962 Liverpool City Council election
- 1962 Manchester City Council election
- 1962 Orpington Urban District Council election
- 1962 Salford City Council election
- 1962 Sheffield City Council election

=== London ===
- Battersea
- Bermondsey
- Bethnal Green
- Camberwell
- Chelsea
- Deptford
- Finsbury
- Fulham
- Greenwich
- Hackney
- Hammersmith
- Hampstead
- Holborn
- Islington
- Kensington
- Lambeth
- Lewisham
- Paddington
- Poplar
- Shoreditch
- Southwark
- Stepney
- St Marylebone
- Stoke Newington
- St Pancras
- Wandsworth
- Westminster
- Woolwich

== Scotland ==
- 1962 Edinburgh Corporation election

== See also ==
- 1962 in the United Kingdom
