= André Maranne =

French-British actor (1926–2021)

- Maranne in Curse of the Pink Panther (1983)
- Born: André Gaston Maillol; 14 May 1926; Toulouse, Occitania, France
- Died: 12 April 2021 (aged 94); Brighton, East Sussex, England
- Citizenship: France; United Kingdom (after 1967)
- Occupation: Actor
- Years active: 1956–1991
- Spouse: Moira Mitchell (m. 1955)

André Maranne (born André Gaston Maillol; 14 May 1926 – 12 April 2021) was a French-British actor, who appeared in numerous film and television character roles beginning in the mid-1950s. He was best known for playing Police Sergeant François Chevalier in six Pink Panther films alongside Peter Sellers.

== Early life ==
Maranne was born André Gaston Maillol in Toulouse, in 1926. He was raised by a single mother, Fanita Malliol, and spent part of his childhood in Algeria. In the 1930s, the family moved to Paris. After a brief stint studying at the drama school of the Comédie-Française, Maranne joined the Army, acting in regional theatre after his discharge.

In 1955, he married an English schoolteacher, Moira Mitchell, and moved to the United Kingdom. He was naturalised as a British citizen in 1967.

== Career ==
Maranne's best known role was probably Sergeant François Chevalier in six Pink Panther films alongside Peter Sellers, Herbert Lom and Burt Kwouk. Before the Pink Panther, he appeared as a French officer in The War Lover (1962) and had a cameo role in the James Bond movie Thunderball (1965).

Maranne appeared in such diverse television programmes as Merton Park Studios' Scotland Yard (as a gendarme in 1956 episode "Wall of Death" and credited as André Maillol & the 1957 episode "Night Crossing" as Detective Nouvel credited as Andre Maranne), Jason King ("Wanna buy a television series?", 1971), Fawlty Towers (as André in the 1975 "Gourmet Night" episode), Lord Peter Wimsey ("Clouds of Witness", 1972), Yes Minister (as European Agricultural Commissioner Maurice, proponent of the "euro-sausage", in "Party Games", 1984, the episode in which Jim Hacker becomes UK Prime Minister), All Creatures Great and Small and Doctor Who (The Moonbase, 1967).

Maranne was also one of the four co-presenters of the French teaching programme, Bonjour Françoise on the BBC in the 1960s; he acted in all eight episodes of La Chasse au Trésor (1967) as well as all 24 episodes of Ensemble-French for Beginners in the 1970s, also for the BBC. Maranne provided English audio translation of French-speaking interviewees in the 1988 ITV documentary The Men Who Killed Kennedy.

== Personal life ==
Maranne had a stepson, television director Bruce MacDonald. He maintained a summer villa in Aix-en-Provence, and was an avid windsurfer.

=== Death ===
Maranne died 12 April 2021 in Brighton at the age of 94.

== Selected filmography ==
- Wicked as They Come (1956) as Paris Barman (uncredited)
- Port Afrique (1956) as Police Officer
- Loser Takes All (1956) as Bar Waiter (uncredited)
- Rogue's Yarn (1957) as French Fisherman (uncredited)
- The Birthday Present (1957) as French Customs Officer (uncredited)
- Carve Her Name with Pride (1958) as Garage Man
- Law and Disorder (1958) as Fisherman (uncredited)
- Harry Black (1958) as Frenchman
- The Whole Truth (1958) as Car owner
- The Square Peg (1958) as Jean-Claude
- The Giant Behemoth (1959) as French Radio Officer (uncredited)
- A French Mistress (1960) as Dubbing (voice)
- The Greengage Summer (1961) as Mounsieur Dufour
- Two Wives at One Wedding (1961) as Paul
- Middle Course (1961) as Franz
- The Silent Invasion (1962) as Argen
- H.M.S. Defiant (1962) as Colonel Giraud
- The War Lover (1962) as French Officer (uncredited)
- Come Fly with Me (1963) as French Hotel Clerk (uncredited)
- Maniac (1963) as Salon (voice, uncredited)
- A Shot in the Dark (1964) as Sgt. François Chevalier
- The Beauty Jungle (1964) as Lift Man (uncredited)
- Night Train to Paris (1964) as Louis Vernay
- Return from the Ashes (1965) as 2nd Detective (voice, uncredited)
- Thunderball (1965) as SPECTRE No. 10 (uncredited)
- Doctor in Clover (1966) as Pierre in French film
- The Terrornauts (1967) as Gendarme
- The Girl on a Motorcycle (1968) as French Superintendent
- Duffy (1968) as Garain
- Battle of Britain (1969) as French Army Signals NCO
- Darling Lili (1970) as Lt. Liggett
- And Soon the Darkness (1970) as Radio DJ (voice, uncredited)
- The Guardians (1971) as Felicien de Bastion
- Our Miss Fred (1972) as French Resistance Fighter
- Bequest to the Nation (1973) as Adm. Villenueuve
- Paul and Michelle (1974) as Bellancourt
- Percy's Progress (1974) as French Newsreader (uncredited)
- Gold (1974) as Syndicate Member
- The Return of the Pink Panther (1975) as Sgt. François Chevalier
- The Pink Panther Strikes Again (1976) as Sgt François Chevalier
- Revenge of the Pink Panther (1978) as Sgt. François Chevalier
- The London Connection (1979) as Duvalier
- S.O.S. Titanic (1979) as Michel Navratil
- Rise and Fall of Idi Amin (1981) as French Ambassador
- Trail of the Pink Panther (1982) as Sgt. François Chevalier
- Curse of the Pink Panther (1983) as Sgt. François Chevalier
- The Razor's Edge (1984) as Joseph, the butler
- Morons from Outer Space (1985) as Prof. Trousseau
- Plenty (1985) as Villon
