= Rag Doll (film) =

1961 British film by Lance Comfort

- USA film poster
- Directed by: Lance Comfort
- Written by: Derry Quinn; Brock Williams
- Produced by: Tom Blakeley
- Starring: Christina Gregg; Hermione Baddeley; Kenneth Griffith; Jess Conrad
- Cinematography: Basil Emmott
- Music by: Martin Slavin
- Distributed by: Butcher's Film Service
- Release date: 1961
- Running time: 67 minutes
- Country: United Kingdom
- Language: English

Rag Doll, released in the USA as Young, Willing and Eager, is a 1961 British second feature crime film, directed by Lance Comfort and starring Christina Gregg, Kenneth Griffith, Jess Conrad and Hermione Baddeley. It was written by Derry Quinn and Brock Williams.

== Plot ==
Seventeen-year-old Carol flees her small-town home to escape from her alcoholic stepfather, and heads off to London where she is drawn to the sleazy excitement of Soho and finds work in a coffee bar. Carol is soon receiving advances from her boss, Mort Wilson, who, though older, professes to be in love with her. Meanwhile she falls in love with handsome young would-be nightclub singer Joe Shane and soon they are a couple. She discovers that Joe is a small-time crook on the side, with a gang background and a line in burglary.

When Carol becomes pregnant, Joe decides to do one last job to make the money to take them to a fresh start in Canada. He burgles Mort's house but Mort catches him in the act. After shooting Mort dead, Joe, himself severely wounded, goes on the run with Carol in a stolen car. They crash in a country lane and carry on by foot. The next morning, pursued by the police, Joe collapses in a field and dies from his injuries.

== Cast ==
- Christina Gregg as Carol
- Hermione Baddeley as Auntie
- Kenneth Griffith as Mort Wilson
- Jess Conrad as Joe Shane
- Patrick Magee as Flynn
- Patrick Jordan as Wills
- Michael Wynne as Bellamy
- Frank Forsyth as Superintendent

== Soundtrack ==
Jess Conrad sings "Why Am I Living?" (composers: Abbe Gail, Martin Slavin), released in 1961 as a 7" single (Decca 45-F.11348).

== Critical reception ==
The Monthly Film Bulletin wrote: "This meandering picture tells a nickelodeon story against London night life backgrounds, wastes no time on things like conviction and characterisation, but achieves nothing compensatory either. Jess Conrad, incidentally, sings 'Why Am I Living?' "

Chibnall and McFarlane in The British 'B' Film write that the film is an "unremarkable morality tale about how the big city nearly ruins a provincial girl, but Basil Emmott's camera gives an authentic touch of drab ordinariness to the roadhouse she quits, of urban danger to the city she innocently samples, and imbues the pastoral setting of the final chase with an undertow of shabbiness."

== Legacy ==
The film gained a new audience in the 2000s in response to Conrad's elevation to cult status as a purveyor of late-1950s and early-1960s pre-Beatles British kitsch, and received a Region 2 DVD release in 2009 in a double bill with Comfort's 1962 film The Painted Smile.
