= Donald Eccles =

British actor (1908–1986)

- 1939 Spotlight photo
- Born: Donald Yarrow Eccles; 26 April 1908; Nafferton, Yorkshire, England
- Died: 2 February 1986 (aged 77); Haywards Heath, Sussex, England
- Citizenship: British
- Occupation: Actor

Donald Eccles (26 April 1908 – 2 February 1986) was a British character actor.

Donald Yarrow Eccles was born in Nafferton, Yorkshire on 26 April 1908 the son of Charles Henry and Constance Eccles; his father was a doctor. Eccles was educated at Highgate School and then worked in an insurance office.

He made his stage debut in New York City in 1930, and later became known as a member of the Royal Shakespeare Company. His debut in London was in Counsellor at Law in 1934 at the Piccadilly. During the Second World War he spent six years in the Royal Navy.

In 1960 he acted in the film A Taste of Money and later appeared in many other films including A Midsummer Night's Dream (1968), The Wicker Man (1973), The Hunchback of Notre Dame (1982), Coming Out of the Ice (1982), The Dresser (1983), The Master of Ballantrae (1984), A Private Function (1984) and Young Sherlock Holmes (1985). He also appeared in many television roles, such as Pollio in I, Claudius and Mr Justice Vosper in the second series of Rumpole of the Bailey, until his death in a road accident in Brighton.

== Filmography ==
=== Film ===
Year	Title	Role	Notes
1961	A Taste of Money	Joe	Feature film
1962	Backfire!	Hargreaves	
1968	A Midsummer Night's Dream	Starveling	Feature film
1972	Doctor Who	Krasis	TV series (serial: The Time Monster)
1973	The Wicker Man	T.H. Lennox	Feature film
1982	The Hunchback of Notre Dame	Judge	TV movie
1982	Coming Out of the Ice	Nesterov	TV movie
1983	The Dresser	Mr. Godstone	Feature film
1984	The Master of Ballantrae	John Paul	TV movie
1984	A Private Function	Father	Feature film
1985	Young Sherlock Holmes	The Reverend Duncan Nesbitt	Feature film

=== Television ===
	Title	Role	Notes
1964	The Human Jungle	2nd lawyer (uncredited)	TV series
1968	The Caesars (TV series)	Nerva	TV series
1972	Emma	Mr Woodhouse	TV adaptation
1975	I, Claudius	Polio	TV adaptation
1979	Rumpole of the Bailey	Mr Justice Vosper	TV series, season 2
1980	Lady Killers	Judge, Dr. A.J. Pepper	TV series
1983	Crown Court (TV series)	Mr Justice Hammond	TV series
