= 1962 in British music =

This is a summary of 1962 in music in the United Kingdom, including the official charts from that year.

== Summary ==
Popular music in the UK continues to be dominated by American acts, but a homegrown style of pop music has begun to evolve, led by performers such as Cliff Richard and The Shadows. The Hollies, The Swinging Blue Jeans, The Merseybeats, The Nashville Teens and The Rolling Stones all form during this year. The Beatles begin to be known outside Merseyside. Novelty records with a British flavour, such as Mike Sarne's "Come Outside" and Anthony Newley's "That Noise", continue to be successful.

== Events ==
- 1 January – The Beatles and Brian Poole and the Tremeloes both audition at Decca Records, a company which has the option of signing one group only. The Beatles are rejected, mainly because the Tremeloes are Dagenham-based, and thus nearer London.
- 5 January – The first album on which The Beatles play, My Bonnie, as backing to Tony Sheridan (recorded last June in Hamburg), is released by Polydor.
- 24 January – Brian Epstein signs a contract to manage the Beatles.
- 21 February – Margot Fonteyn and Rudolf Nureyev dance together for the first time, in a Royal Ballet performance of Giselle.
- March – Record Mirror stops compiling its own chart and begins publishing Record Retailer's instead.
- 21 March – 17-year-old Jacqueline du Pré makes her concerto début at the Royal Festival Hall, playing the Elgar Cello Concerto with the BBC Symphony Orchestra under Rudolf Schwarz.
- 7 April – Mick Jagger and Keith Richards meet Brian Jones at The Ealing Club, a blues club in London
- 30 May – Meredith Davies conducts with Benjamin Britten the première of Britten's War Requiem, now regarded as a landmark of British 20th-century music, following the re-consecration of Coventry Cathedral. The principal orchestra is the City of Birmingham Symphony Orchestra and the soloists are Peter Pears and Dietrich Fischer-Dieskau with Heather Harper, since the intended soprano, Galina Vishnevskaya, has been refused permission at a late stage by the Soviet authorities to travel.
- 16 August – The Beatles fire Pete Best and replace him as drummer with Ringo Starr.
- 17 August – Instrumental "Telstar" by The Tornados is released in the UK. It will eventually be the first recording by a British group to reach the top spot on the Billboard Hot 100 in the United States, proving a precursor of the British Invasion.
- 18 August – The Beatles play their first live engagement with the line-up of John, Paul, George and Ringo, at Hulme Hall, Port Sunlight.
- 23 August – John Lennon marries Cynthia Powell in an unpublicised register office ceremony at Mount Pleasant, Liverpool.
- 5 October – The Beatles' first single in their own right, "Love Me Do"/"P.S. I Love You", is released on EMI's Parlophone label. This version was recorded on 4 September at Abbey Road Studios in London with Ringo Starr as drummer.
- 17 October – The Beatles make their first televised appearance, on Granada television's local news programme People and Places in the north of England, introduced by Gay Byrne.
- 11 November – Ken Russell's film Elgar is shown in BBC Television's Monitor series.

== The Official UK Singles Chart ==
- See UK No.1 Hits of 1962

== Classical music: new works ==
- Malcolm Arnold – Concerto for Two Violins and String Orchestra
- Benjamin Britten –
  - War Requiem
  - A Hymn of St Columba
- Dilys Elwyn-Edwards – Caneuon y Tri Aderyn
- Alun Hoddinott – Folksong Suite
- William Mathias – Postlude
- Robert Simpson – Symphony No. 3
- Michael Tippett – Piano Sonata No. 2

== Opera ==
- Michael Tippett – King Priam

== Film and Incidental music ==
- John Addison – The Loneliness of the Long Distance Runner, starring Tom Courtenay.
- Antony Hopkins – Billy Budd directed by and starring Peter Ustinov, co-starring Terence Stamp.
- Monty Norman – Dr. No directed by Terence Young, starring Sean Connery.

== Musical theatre ==
- 8 May – Blitz!, Lionel Bart's new musical, opens at London's Adelphi Theatre, and runsfor 568 performances.

== Musical films ==
- The Cool Mikado, starring Frankie Howerd and Lionel Blair
- It's Trad, Dad!, starring Helen Shapiro and Craig Douglas
- Play It Cool, starring Billy Fury

== Births ==
- 4 January – Robin Guthrie (The Cocteau Twins)
- 16 January – Paul Webb (Talk Talk)
- 31 January – Sophie Muller, British music video director
- 2 March – Jack Gibbons, pianist and composer
- 5 March – Craig Reid and Charlie Reid, The Proclaimers
- 14 March – Peter Copley, composer, cellist and pianist
- 15 March – Terence Trent D'Arby, American-born singer
- 17 March – Clare Grogan, actress and singer
- 14 May – Ian Astbury, British rock singer (The Cult)
- 8 June – Nick Rhodes (Duran Duran)
- 22 June – Bobby Gillespie, vocalist (Primal Scream)
- 27 June – Michael Ball, actor and singer
- 2 August – Lee Mavers singer, songwriter and guitarist (The La's)
- 2 November – Graham Waterhouse, composer and cellist
- 3 November – Marilyn, pop vocalist
- 20 November – Steve Alexander, drummer (Brother Beyond)
- 24 November – John Squire, guitarist, musician (The Stone Roses), (The Seahorses)
- 6 December – Ben Watt, DJ, and record producer, one half of Everything but the Girl
- 12 December – John Jones, record producer
- date unknown
  - Andrew Glover, composer
  - Tolga Kashif, composer

== Deaths ==
- 14 March – Norman Coke-Jephcott, organist and composer, 67
- 10 April – Stuart Sutcliffe, former member of The Beatles, 21 (cerebral paralysis caused by a brain hemorrhage)
- 30 April – Edward Clark, conductor and radio producer, 73
- 12 June – John Ireland, pianist and composer, 82
- 13 June – Sir Eugene Aynsley Goossens, conductor, 69
- 24 August – Henry Ley, organist, composer and music teacher, 74
- 18 November – Clifford Bax, playwright, poet, lyricist and hymn writer, brother of Arnold Bax, 76
- 16 December – Lily Elsie, popular actress and singer, 76
- date unknown – Anderson Tyrer, pianist

== See also ==
- 1962 in British radio
- 1962 in British television
- 1962 in the United Kingdom
- List of British films of 1962
