= Hang Up Your Brightest Colours =

- Directed by: Antony Thomas
- Country of origin: United Kingdom

Production
- Producer: Kenneth Griffith

Original release
- Release: 1973

Hang Up Your Brightest Colours is a 1973 film by Welsh actor and filmmaker Kenneth Griffith, about the life and death of Irish Republican leader Michael Collins. It was directed by Antony Thomas.

Although usually classed as a documentary, the film more closely resembles a dramatic monologue, with Griffith frequently delivering quotes by key figures such as David Lloyd George, Winston Churchill, and Collins himself, "in character".

The film was commissioned by media mogul Lew Grade for transmission by ATV, the ITV region covering the Midlands he controlled at the time. Grade had, in fact, offered to fund whatever subject Griffith wanted to make, but when he viewed the finished film, he refused to show it. In his memoirs, Griffith claimed that Grade was unofficially instructed not to offer the film to the IBA for network transmission, so the Association would not have to reject it and thus be accused of political censorship. Griffith took legal action, received an out-of-court settlement and built his home, which he called Michael Collins House, in Islington with the proceeds. It was first broadcast on BBC One in Wales only in 1993, and networked across the United Kingdom by BBC Two the following year.
