= Frank Tilsley =

British novelist, broadcaster, and television dramatist

- Born: Frank Tilsley; May 5, 1904; Lancashire
- Died: March 16, 1957 (aged 52)
- Occupation: Writer (novelist)
- Writing career
- Period: 20th century
- Genre: Fiction

Frank Tilsley (5 May 1904 – 16 March 1957) was a British novelist, broadcaster, and television dramatist. Tilsley became a full-time author after the publication of his first novel, Plebeian's Progress (1933), and subsequently published over twenty novels, including She Was There Too (1938), Pleasure Beach (1944), Champion Road (1948), Heaven and Herbert Common (1953), and Brother Nap (1954). His novel Mutiny (1958) was adapted for film and released as H.M.S. Defiant, starring Alec Guinness and Dirk Bogarde, in 1962. Tilsley was also a frequent radio broadcaster and writer of popular television shows including The Makepeace Story.

== Life ==
Tilsley was born and raised in Levenshulme, where he was educated at Chapel Street Council School, Levenshulme. He worked in a variety of fields, including as an accountant's clerk and a schoolteacher. His first novel, Plebeian's Progress (1933), was met warmly by critics and was "highly valued for the authenticity of its critical depiction of working-class conditions in a period of economic depression." Following the success of his debut novel, Tilsley was able to write full-time. He continued writing until his death in 1957, publishing over twenty novels. During World War II, he served in the RAF as a war reporter, and was given the rank of Squadron Leader. After the war, Tilsley joined the BBC, where he wrote for both radio and television.

== Selected work ==
- Plebeian's Progress. Victor Gollancz. 1933. LCCN unk82082812.
- I'd Do It Again. Morley-Baker (originally published in 1936 by Martin Secker & Warburg, Ltd.). 1969 – via Internet Archive (Kahle/Austin Foundation). LCCN 36-18204; ISBN 0-0930-9810-3; OCLC 3662095 (all editions).
- Devil Take the Hindmost. 1937. LCCN 37-5412; ISBN 0-0930-7840-4; OCLC 10446514 (all editions).
- She Was There Too. 1938. LCCN 38-36510.
- I'd Hate to Be Dead. 1938. LCCN 38-11074.
- First Things First. 1938. LCCN 39-17016.
- We Live and Learn. 1939. LCCN 42-52051.
- Little Tin God. 1939. LCCN 39-20952.
- The Love Story of Gilbert Bright. 1940.
- Little Man, This Now (originally published under the pseudonym XYZ). 1940.
- Wonderful Journey. 1940. LCCN 40-35424.
- The Lady in the Fur Coat. 1941. LCCN 41-7661.
- What's in It for Walter. 1942.
- The Boys of Coastal (re: RAF Coastal Command during World War II). 1944. LCCN 45-2859.
- Pleasure Beach. 1944. LCCN 44-4459.
- Jim Comes Home. 1945. LCCN 45-21682.
- Peggy Windsor and the American Soldier. 1946.
- Champion Road. Julian Messner. 1948 – via Internet Archive (Kahle/Austin Foundation). LCCN 50-26030; LCCN 50-9977.
- The Jungle of Your Heart. 1950. LCCN 50-30863.
- Heaven and Herbert Common. Eyre & Spottiswoode. 1953. ISBN 978-0-0930-9840-5, 0-0930-9840-5; OCLC 23162299 (all editions).
- Fortunate Man. 1953. LCCN 53-8491.
- Voice of the Crowd. 1954. LCCN 54-31405.
- Brother Nap. 1954. LCCN 55-16982.
- Thicker Than Water. 1955. LCCN 56-33962.
- Seth Makepeace. Eyre & Spottiswoode. 1956 – via Internet Archive (Kahle/Austin Foundation).
- By Special Request. Tilsley was a contributor. 1958.
- Mutiny. 1958. LCCN 59-5996, LCCN 58-46360.
Newspaper short stories
- Manchester Guardian (The); Tilsley, Frank (31 October 1933). "The Test". No. 27190 (City ed.). p. 18 (col. 1) – via Newspapers.com.
- Manchester Guardian (The); Tilsley, Frank (9 December 1936). "Fourteen". No. 28154 (City ed.). p. 20 (col. 1) – via Newspapers.com.

== Bibliography ==
=== References ===
- Belfast Telegraph (online); McIlwaine, Eddie (6 August 2016). "Secret Journal That Couldn't Fall Into the Hands of Nazis: Royal Air Force Journal".
1. Citing publication → Royal Air Force Journal (PDF). 2 (4). February 1944 – via International Bomber Command Centre.
2. And publication article → Flight Lieutenant Frank Tilsley. "The Abby Memorial" (PDF): 140–141.
- Birmingham Post & Birmingham Gazette (The) (18 March 1957). "Author Dead in Garage" (re: Frank Tilsley, age 52, died March 16, 1951). No. 30752. – via Newspapers.com.
1. 1st ed.. p. 7 (col. 1, middle).
2. County ed.. p. 7 (col. 1, middle).
3. Dudley ed.. p. 7 (col. 1, middle).

- H.M.S. Defiant. Published by the author, Frank Tilsley, July 27, 2016 – via Google Books. ISBN 978-1-5355-6251-5
- "Frank Tilsley". IMDb.
- Oxford Companion (The) (1996). "Tilsley, Frank". In Stringer, Jenny (ed.). The Oxford Companion to Twentieth-Century Literature in English. Oxford University Press. LCCN 96-26699; ISBN 978-0-1915-1647-4, 0-1921-2271-1; OCLC 71197155 (all editions), 895004031.
1. Book (online). 1996. p. 669 – via Internet Archive.
2. Oxford Reference (online). 2005.
3. ProQuest Ebook Central. 1996. p. 669.
- Radio Times (online). Sunday Night Theater: The Makepeace Story (4 stories). BBC TV. Archived from the original on 7 October 2022 – via BBC Genome Project.
Online:
1. "The Ruthless Destiny" (aired Sunday, October 16, 1955; 20:15). Archived from the original on 7 October 2022.
2. "A New Generation" (aired Sunday, October 23, 1955; 20:15). Archived from the original on 7 October 2022.
3. "Family Business" (aired Sunday, October 30, 1955; 20:15). Archived from the original on 4 May 2019.
4. "The New Executive" (aired Sunday, November 6, 1955; 20:15). Archived from the original on 7 October 2022.
- Radio Times. BBC. Retrieved May 4, 2019 – via BBC Genome Project. ISSN 0033-8060; OCLC 1763373 (all editions).
"Sunday Television" (programming):
1. "The Ruthless Destiny". 129 (1666). October 14, 1955: 14. Archived from the original on 7 October 2022.
2. "A New Generation". 129 (1667). October 23, 1955: 14. Archived from the original on 7 October 2022.
3. "Family Business". 129 (1668). October 30, 1955: 14. Archived from the original on 7 October 2022.
4. "The New Executive". 129 (1669). November 6, 1955: 14. Archived from the original on 7 October 2022.
Articles:
1. "A Man Called Seth". 129 (1666). October 14, 1955: 6. Archived from the original on 7 October 2022.
2. "The New Executive". 129 (1669). November 6, 1955: 15. Archived from the original on 7 October 2022.
- Who Was Who. "Tilsley, Frank". Vol. 5: "1951–1960" (4th ed.). London: Adam & Charles Black (publisher). 1984 [1961]. pp. 1089–1090 – via Internet Archive (Kahle/Austin Foundation). ISBN 0-7136-2598-8.
