= The Break (1963 film) =

British drama by Lance Comfort

- Directed by: Lance Comfort
- Written by: Pip and Jane Baker
- Starring: Tony Britton; William Lucas; Christina Gregg
- Cinematography: Basil Emmott
- Edited by: Peter Pitt
- Music by: Brian Fahey
- Production company: Mancunian Film Corporation Ltd.
- Release date: 7 July 1963
- Running time: 77 minutes
- Country: United Kingdom
- Language: English

The Break is a 1963 British second feature drama film directed by Lance Comfort and starring Tony Britton, William Lucas and Christina Gregg. It was written by Pip and Jane Baker.

== Plot ==
Jacko Thomas is a dangerous criminal who escapes from the train taking him to prison and hides in the secluded Dartmoor hotel run by Judd Tredgar, who had arranged his escape. Also staying at the hotel are Thomas's sister Sue, private detective Pearson, and novelist Greg Parker, the man Pearson is investigating. When Pearson discovers that Tredgar is running a smuggling racket, Thomas kills him. Meanwhile Parker has fallen in love with Sue, and finds himself in a dangerous situation. Parker and Thomas fight, and Sarah, the mute servant, kills Thomas, as an act of revenge for his murder of her brother Moses.

== Cast ==
- Tony Britton as Greg Parker
- William Lucas as Jacko Thomas
- Eddie Byrne as Judd Tredgar
- Robert Urquhart as Pearson
- Sonia Dresdel as Sarah
- Edwin Richfield as Moses
- Gene Anderson as Jean Tredgar
- Christina Gregg as Sue Thomas
- Patrick Jordan as driver
- John Junkin as Harry
- Marshall Jones as Jim

== Critical response ==
Monthly Film Bulletin said: "A routine plot, adequately acted by a cast which deserved better things. Set principally in the farmhouse, the few exteriors used are bleak moorland and quarry – in keeping, perhaps, with the melodrama and general dreariness of the production."

Chibnall and McFarlane in The British 'B' Film wrote: "The Break has a striking pre-credits sequence (a device not then very common) involving a criminal's leap from a train, a murder and an arrest. Comfort typically takes the film out of that stagy interior setting, avoiding that airless, studio-set claustrophobia with so often bedevils British budget film-making, and the action sequences are handled with real flair. The narrative shifts to a farmhouse, run as a hotel by an edgy married couple who are also involved in a smuggling racket. The setting-and-character mix sometimes recalls old-fashioned three-act plays, but a strong cast (including Sonia Dresdel as a grimly enigmatic cook, and William Lucas as the fugitive) gives point to the film's relationships."

The Radio Times Guide to Films gave the film 2/5 stars, writing: "Lance Comfort directs this plodding whodunnit, in which a detective, a novelist, a fleeing crook and his sister stumble upon dark deeds on a Devon farm. Tony Britton does his best in the lead, but the mystery isn't likely to put too much strain on your little grey cells."
