= Two Wives at One Wedding =

1961 British film by Montgomery Tully

- Directed by: Montgomery Tully
- Written by: Brian Clemens; Eldon Howard
- Produced by: Edward J. Danziger; Harry Lee Danziger
- Starring: Gordon Jackson; Christina Gregg; Lisa Daniely
- Cinematography: Bert Mason
- Edited by: John Dunsford
- Music by: Bill LeSage
- Release date: 1961
- Running time: 66 minutes
- Country: United Kingdom
- Language: English

Two Wives at One Wedding is a low budget 1961 British crime film directed by Montgomery Tully and starring Gordon Jackson, Christina Gregg, and Lisa Daniely. It was written by Brian Clemens and Eldon Howard and produced by The Danzigers.

== Plot ==
Tom Murray's wedding day becomes a nightmare when a mysterious stranger turns up claiming to be his wife. Annette is a French woman who met Tom during the Second World War when he was injured near Normandy, and she nursed him back to health. She claims that Tom became her husband then, but he has no memory of it.

Annette is willing to divorce Tom, but only with a settlement of £10,000. Blackmailed, and with his promising medical career in the balance if the story reaches the press, Tom turns detective to determine if Annette is telling the truth.

== Cast ==
- Gordon Jackson as Tom
- Christina Gregg as Chris
- Lisa Daniely as Annette
- André Maranne as Paul
- Humphrey Lestocq as Mark
- Viola Keats as Mrs. Ervine
- Douglas Ives as Jessop
- John Serret as LaRouche
- Annette Carell as Maria
- Steve Plytas as Bellac
- Edith Savile as Mrs. Delroy
- Geoffrey Denton as Dr. Delroy
- C. Denier Warren as fat man
- Julian Sherrier as Pierre
- André Charise as information officer

== Critical reception ==
The Monthly Film Bulletin wrote: "The weak story, which leaves little to the imagination and carries no conviction, seldom rises above the insipid level of a TV playlet. Characterisation and direction are without interest."

Kine Weekly wrote: "The tale leaves little to chance or the imagination and both the characterisation and direction are unsubtle, but a popular romantic element, artfully plugged, and a salutary climax just tip scales in its favour. So-so British "second." ... The picture has a promising wedding reception opening, but the flashbacks to wartime France are crude and time hangs until the hero and villain finally get to grips, Christina Gregg and Lisa Daniely contrast effectively as Janet and Annette, but Gordon Jackson lacks conviction as Tom, Andre Maranne is a very obvious villain as Paul, and the French characters have trouble with their accents. In short, the play seldom rises far above TV level."

TV Guide wrote that "an intriguing premise suffers from some unbelievable plot twists and turns".
