= Life in Emergency Ward 10 =

1959 British film by Robert Day

- Directed by: Robert Day
- Written by: Hazel Adair; Tessa Diamond
- Produced by: Ted Lloyd
- Starring: Michael Craig
- Cinematography: Geoffrey Faithfull
- Edited by: Lito Carruthers
- Music by: Philip Green
- Production company: Artistes Alliance
- Distributed by: Eros Films
- Release date: 9 April 1959
- Running time: 86 minutes
- Country: United Kingdom
- Language: English

Life in Emergency Ward 10 (also known as Emergency Ward 10) is a 1959 British film directed by Robert Day and starring Michael Craig and Wilfrid Hyde-White. It was written by Hazel Adair and Tessa Diamon, based on the television series Emergency Ward 10.

== Cast ==
- Michael Craig as Dr. Stephen Russell
- Wilfrid Hyde-White as Professor Bourne-Evans
- Dorothy Alison as Sister Janet Fraser
- Glyn Owen as Dr. Paddy O'Meara
- Rosemary Miller as Nurse Pat Roberts
- Bud Tingwell as Dr. Alan Dawson
- Frederick Bartman as Dr. Simon Forrester
- Joan Sims as Mrs. Pryor
- Rupert Davies as Dr. Tom Hunter
- Sheila Sweet as Anne Hunter
- David Lodge as Mr. Phillips
- Dorothy Gordon as Mrs. Phillips
- Christopher Witty as David Phillips
- Tony Quinn as Joe Cooney
- Douglas Ives as Potter
- George Tovey as Mr. Pryor
- Pauline Stroud as Nurse Vincent
- Christina Gregg as Nurse April Andrews
- Kenneth J. Warren as Porter
- Jean Aubrey as Judy Wayne

== Critical reception ==
The Monthly Film Bulletin wrote: "A hospital comedy-drama of the most predictable kind, based on the popular television series and featuring a number of its players. They seem notably more at ease than the imported cinema stars who play the main roles, and Wilfrid Hyde White and Michael Craig make a peculiarly unconvincing pair of surgeons. The medical details seem authentic enough to a layman and the tension is well sustained during the inevitable operation scene. In spite of shallow and mechanical writing, Christopher Witty is refreshingly natural as David; and there are good performances from Glyn Owen as an enthusiastic obstetrician and Joan Sims as the mother of quads."

Picturegoer wrote: "Come strikes, war scares or mass unemployment, life in Emergency Ward 10 – like life with the Dales and the Archers – is cosily inevitable. Not much different from the TV series, here disaster is hinted at but narrowly averted. Tears are expertly jerked and happily dried by the last reel. Jolly doctors josh amiable nurses."

Picture Show wrote: "Extremely entertaining hospital story based on the popular television series, which devotees of the programme will enjoy for it includes some of the TV cast. ... Interwoven are various incidents that make humorous, sincere and at times tensely dramatic entertainment."

Variety wrote: "There is nothing new about this film, but it is directed and acted with real enthusiasm. Though it has all the hospital cliches, there is a disarming sincerity about the pic."

In British Sound Films: The Studio Years 1928–1959 David Quinlan rated the film as "average", writing: "Soapy situations are expertly dispensed, but it's too unreal for tears to flow."

The Radio Times Guide to Films gave the film 1/5 stars, writing: "Two years after taking the nation by storm, ITV's soap smash made it to the big screen, and what a disappointment it was. The characters are caught up in the round of romantic entanglements and medical emergencies that were old hat at the time of MGM's Dr Kildare series. Michael Craig is dreadful as the Oxbridge General new boy playing fast and loose with the hearts of his patients and a colleague's neglected wife, and even the usually reliable Wilfrid Hyde White is off colour."
