= A Taste of Money =

1961 British film by Max Varnel

- UK theatrical poster
- Directed by: Max Varnel
- Written by: Mark Grantham (original story)
- Produced by: Edward J. Danziger; Harry Lee Danziger
- Starring: Jean Cadell; Dick Emery; Pete Murray
- Cinematography: James Wilson (as Jimmy Wilson)
- Edited by: Desmond Saunders
- Production company: Danziger Productions
- Distributed by: United Artists Corporation
- Release date: 8 January 1961
- Running time: 71 minutes
- Country: United Kingdom
- Language: English

A Taste of Money is a 1961 British comedy crime film directed by Max Varnel and starring Jean Cadell, Dick Emery and Pete Murray. It was written by Mark Grantham and produced by the Danzigers.

== Premise ==
An elderly spinster who works as a cashier for an insurance company plots to rob her employers by concocting the perfect crime.

== Cast ==
- Dick Emery as Morrissey
- Jean Cadell as Miss Brill
- Pete Murray as Dave
- Ralph Michael as Superintendent White
- Donald Eccles as Joe
- C. Denier Warren as Tyler
- John Bennett as waiter
- Robert Raglan as Simpson
- Mark Singleton as detective
- Christina Gregg as Ruth
- Derek Sydney as Barman
- Anton Rodgers as Shop assistant
- Kevin Stoney as Purser
- Margaret Flint as Miss Reardon
- Libby Morris as Woman

== Critical reception ==
The Monthly Film Bulletin wrote: "There are some loose ends and a tediously conventional love interest, but the scene in which Miss Brill, firmly but subtly played by Jean Cadell, visits a sleazy night club in search of crooks to help her, is really rather funny. The whole thing is slight and sentimental, but above the Danzigers' usual level."

Kine Weekly wrote: "The picture has some loose ends, but they are neaty tied as its theatrically effective climax approaches. Jean Cadell subtly combines gentle pathos and firm resolution as Miss Brill; Dick Emery convinces as the tough Morrissey; Ralph Michael impresses as Inspector White; and Pete Murray and Christina Gregg make the most of the conventional love angle as Dave and Ruth, The actual robbery creates strong tension, the spinster's loneliness is movingly depicted, and the intermittent night club sequences, complete with tarts and jive, prevent the sentimental asides from cloying. In all, a woman's film and thriller."

TV Guide called the film "an uninspired comedy," and noted, "Cadell, at 76 years of age, turns in a charming performance, but that alone cannot save the picture from mediocrity."

Sky Movies wrote: "minor but amusing British comedy that's all the better for its coat of Technicolor. Character actress Jean Cadell is a joy in a rare leading role, and Dick Emery makes a perfect not-quite-funny gangster as his best work for the cinema. Christina Gregg is a pretty heroine in a film, which breaks little fresh ground, yet remains constantly entertaining thanks to good performances."
