= Lance Comfort =

English film director (1908–1966)

- Directing Jess Conrad in Rag Doll (1961)
- Born: 11 August 1908; Harrow, London, England
- Died: 25 August 1966 (aged 58); Worthing, Sussex, England
- Occupations: Film director, producer
- Years active: 1945–1965

Lance Comfort (11 August 1908 – 25 August 1966) was an English film director. He was a prolific maker of B movies from 1945 to 1965.

== Early life ==
Lance Comfort was born in Harrow, London on 11 August 1908.

== Career ==
In a career spanning over 25 years, he became one of the most prolific film directors in Britain, though he never gained critical attention and remained on the fringes of the film industry, creating mostly B movies. He made a number of films for British National Pictures.

Comfort carried on working almost right up to his death in Worthing, Sussex, on 25 August 1966.

== Critical assessment ==
The film historians Steve Chibnall and Brian McFarlane praise Comfort's gifts "in the confident exercise of melodramatic impulses in the interests of illuminating character and relationship, in a decorative visual style to serve these impulses, and in giving their heads to string of dominant actors". They add that all of his films "are persuasive narratives, marked by absence of sentimentality and the whiff of human reality".

== Filmography ==
- Penn of Pennsylvania (1941)
- Hatter's Castle (1942)
- Those Kids from Town (1942)
- Squadron Leader X (1943)
- Escape to Danger (1943)
- When We Are Married (1943)
- Old Mother Riley Detective (1943)
- Hotel Reserve (1944)
- Great Day (1945)
- Bedelia (1946)
- Temptation Harbour (1947)
- Daughter of Darkness (1948)
- Silent Dust (1949)
- Portrait of Clare (1950)
- Douglas Fairbanks, Jr., Presents (1953–1957)
- The Girl on the Pier (1953)
- Bang! You're Dead (1954)
- Eight O'Clock Walk (1954)
- The Man in the Road (1956)
- Face in the Night (1957)
- Man from Tangier (1957)
- At the Stroke of Nine (1957)
- The Ugly Duckling (1959)
- Make Mine a Million (1959)
- The Breaking Point (1961)
- Rag Doll (1961)
- Pit of Darkness (1961)
- The Painted Smile (1961)
- Touch of Death (1961)
- The Break (1962)
- Tomorrow at Ten (1962)
- Blind Corner (1963)
- Live It Up! (also known as Sing and Swing in the U.S.) (1963)
- Be My Guest (1965)
- Devils of Darkness (1965)
