= Fate Takes a Hand =

1961 British film by Max Varnel

- Australian 1-sheet poster
- Directed by: Max Varnel
- Written by: Brian Clemens
- Produced by: The Danzigers
- Starring: Ronald Howard; Christina Gregg
- Cinematography: Jimmy Wilson
- Edited by: Spencer Reeve
- Production company: Danziger Productions Ltd.
- Distributed by: Metro-Goldwyn-Mayer
- Release date: February 1962 (UK)
- Running time: 72 min.
- Country: United Kingdom
- Language: English

Fate Takes a Hand is a 1961 British anthology drama film directed by Max Varnel and starring Ronald Howard and Christina Gregg. It was written by Brian Clemens and produced by The Danzigers.

== Plot ==
The recovery of a post bag stolen in a robbery fifteen years earlier has varying consequences for the lives of five of the recipients of the letters when the Post Office decides that the post should be delivered. Several lives are changed, as witnessed by a newspaper reporter and a Post Office security guard who follow up on several of the letters.

== Cast ==
- Ronald Howard as Tony
- Christina Gregg as Karon
- Basil Dignam as Wheeler
- Willoughby Goddard as Rollenshaw
- Jack Watson as Bulldog
- Peter Butterworth as Ronnie
- Mary Laura Wood as Sandra
- Noel Trevarthen as Bob
- Sheila Whittingham as Jenny
- Michael Peake as Ross
- Laidman Browne as Maxwell
- Derek Blomfield as Briggs
- Valerie Gearon as Peggy
- Valentine Dyall as Wilson
- John Gabriel as Matt Little
- Brian Cobby as Mark
- Peter Swanwick as Preeny
- Bruce Beeby as Inspector Phillips
- Arnold Bell as Finch
- Michael Robbins as Fuller
- Carl Duering as Mike
- Liza Page as Lola
- Reginald Hearne as warder
- Peter Bennett as Max
- Angela Douglas as secretary
- Robert Webber as Wayne
- Eric Dodson as janitor
- Gilda Emmanueli as Sally
- Larry Noble as tough
- Andrew Kane as young boxer
- Martin Wyldeck as doctor

== Critical reception ==
The Monthly Film Bulletin wrote: "Extravagantly unlikely omnibus film made up of five widely assorted vignettes with twist endings. The script is pat and the production values unremarkable, but the blend of comedy, drama and sentiment is bearable in an ingenuous kind of way."

Kine Weekly wrote: "Compact, if slightly extravagant, screen magazine. It contains five widely assorted vignettes within its not unattractive boards and gives each a neat twist ending. The pilot story is adequate, while the direction and acting easily measure up to demands. ... The picture stretches credulity to the full by loading every letter with irony, but its theatricality pays off in a shrewd amalgam of humour, romance and stark drama."

AllMovie called it "a throwback to the British "portmanteau" films of the 1950s."

TV Guide gave the film two out of four stars, and writes that "the effect of the late letters' delivery to the recipients makes for five delightful little tales. Good performances all the way around."
