= Christina Gregg (actress) =

British actress and model

Christina Gregg (born 1939) is a British actress and model, who starred in several British films in the early 1960s.

Aged 17, she won a beauty contest, Miss ABC Television, but was deemed too young to enter Miss Great Britain.

In 1978, she released an album on Warwick Records, Music 'N Motion.

Gregg hosts Senior Beauty My Way with Christina Gregg on YouTube.

She lives in Canada.

== Filmography ==
- Cover Girl Killer (1959)
- Life in Emergency Ward 10 (1959)
- A Taste of Money (1961)
- Fate Takes A Hand (1961)
- Rag Doll (1961)
- Two Wives at One Wedding (1961)
- Don't Talk to Strange Men (1962)
- The Break (1963)
- The Young Racers (1963)

== Television (selected) ==
- Interpol Calling (1959)
- The Saint (1963)
