= 1962 Salford City Council election =

Local election in Salford

- 10 May 1962

16 of 64 seats on Salford City Council 33 seats needed for a majority
	First party	Second party	Third party
Party	Labour	Conservative	Liberal
Last election	10 seats, 48.8%	5 seats, 41.8%	1 seat, 8.8%
Seats before	49	12	3
Seats won	14	1	1
Seats after	51	10	3
Seat change	▲2	▼2	Steady
Popular vote	20,214	14,637	5,353
Percentage	49.9%	36.1%	13.2%
Swing	▲1.1%	▼5.7%	▲4.4%
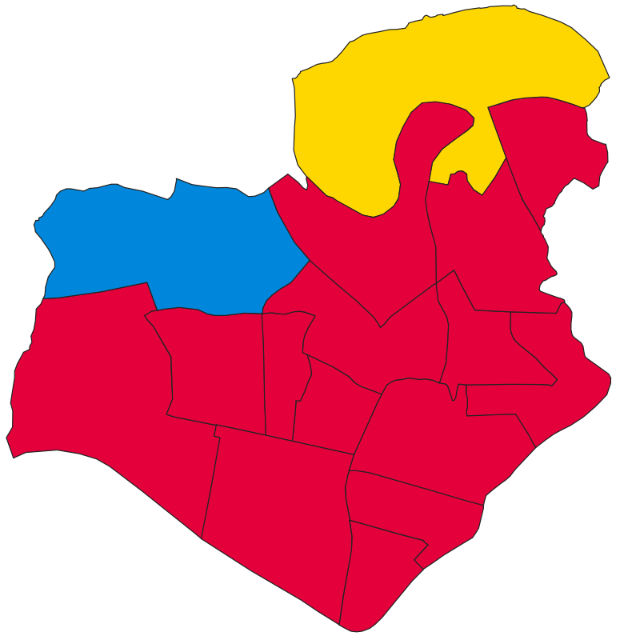
- Map of results of 1962 election
Leader of the Council before election
Labour
Leader of the Council after election
Labour

Elections to Salford City Council were held on Thursday, 10 May 1962. One-third of the councillors seats were up for election, with each successful candidate to serve a three-year term of office. The Labour Party retained overall control of the council.

== Election result ==
Party	Votes		Seats			Full Council	
Labour Party	20,214 (49.9%)	▲1.1	14 (87.5%)	14 / 16	▲2	51 (79.7%)	51 / 64
Conservative Party	14,637 (36.1%)	▼5.7	1 (6.3%)	1 / 16	▼2	10 (15.6%)	10 / 64
Liberal Party	5,353 (13.2%)	▲4.4	1 (6.3%)	1 / 16	Steady	3 (4.7%)	3 / 64
Communist	333 (0.8%)	▲0.2	0 (0.0%)	0 / 16	Steady	0 (0.0%)	0 / 64

=== Full council ===
↓
51	3	10

=== Aldermen ===
↓
16

=== Councillors ===
↓
35	3	10

== Ward results ==
=== Albert Park ===
Albert Park
Party	Candidate	Votes	%	±%
Labour	H. Hopkinson*	1,650	50.5	+4.4
Liberal	J. J. Messenger	981	30.0	−0.4
Conservative	H. Pawsey	639	19.5	−4.0
Majority		669	20.5	+4.8
Turnout		3,270		
Labour hold		Swing		

=== Charlestown ===
Charlestown
Party	Candidate	Votes	%	±%
Labour	E. Hough*	1,574	52.4	+1.6
Conservative	V. M. Bescoby	1,311	43.6	−3.2
Communist	J. Billington	120	4.0	+1.6
Majority		263	8.8	+4.8
Turnout		3,005		
Labour hold		Swing		

=== Claremont ===
Claremont
Party	Candidate	Votes	%	±%
Conservative	V. Hemingway*	2,147	49.4	−25.1
Labour	F. R. Hulbert	1,124	25.9	+0.4
Liberal	J. A. Cooper	1,072	24.7	N/A
Majority		1,023	23.5	−25.5
Turnout		4,343		
Conservative hold		Swing		

=== Crescent ===
Crescent
Party	Candidate	Votes	%	±%
Labour	H. Cawin*	721	67.1	+14.4
Conservative	B. Baxter	353	32.9	+7.0
Majority		368	34.2	+7.4
Turnout		1,074		
Labour hold		Swing		

=== Docks ===
Docks
Party	Candidate	Votes	%	±%
Labour	B. Burchill*	1,269	73.4	+7.2
Conservative	A. E. Watkins	459	26.6	−7.2
Majority		810	46.8	+14.4
Turnout		1,728		
Labour hold		Swing		

=== Kersal ===
Kersal
Party	Candidate	Votes	%	±%
Liberal	M. Corwin*	2,102	44.7	−4.2
Conservative	R. Goodman	1,309	27.9	+7.0
Labour	L. Hough	1,287	27.4	−2.8
Majority		593	12.6	−6.1
Turnout		4,698		
Liberal hold		Swing		

=== Langworthy ===
Langworthy
Party	Candidate	Votes	%	±%
Labour	B. Wallsworth	1,283	66.7	+0.8
Conservative	S. Johnson	640	33.3	−0.8
Majority		643	33.4	+1.6
Turnout		1,923		
Labour hold		Swing		

=== Mandley Park ===
Mandley Park
Party	Candidate	Votes	%	±%
Labour	T. J. A. Harding*	1,914	43.4	−0.6
Conservative	G. Franks	1,563	35.4	−20.6
Liberal	C. Hamburger	935	21.2	N/A
Majority		351	8.0	
Turnout		4,412		
Labour hold		Swing		

=== Ordsall Park ===
Ordsall Park
Party	Candidate	Votes	%	±%
Labour	B. Moylan*	1,459	59.0	−29.6
Conservative	M. H. Fletcher	912	36.9	N/A
Communist	J. Cohen	101	4.1	−7.3
Majority		547	22.1	−55.1
Turnout		2,472		
Labour hold		Swing		

=== Regent ===
Regent
Party	Candidate	Votes	%	±%
Labour	M. Jackson*	1,264	65.2	−3.6
Conservative	J. Bradbury	562	29.0	−2.2
Communist	K. Harvey	112	5.8	N/A
Majority		702	36.2	−1.4
Turnout		1,938		
Labour hold		Swing		

=== St. Matthias' ===
St. Matthias'
Party	Candidate	Votes	%	±%
Labour	J. G. Williams	835	56.1	−11.2
Conservative	A. Boardman	390	26.2	−6.5
Liberal	D. Hammond	263	17.7	N/A
Majority		445	29.9	−4.7
Turnout		1,488		
Labour hold		Swing		

=== St. Paul's ===
St. Paul's
Party	Candidate	Votes	%	±%
Labour	G. D. Franks*	1,094	68.2	+10.2
Conservative	J. Wood	510	31.8	−10.3
Majority		584	36.4	+20.6
Turnout		1,604		
Labour hold		Swing		

=== St. Thomas' ===
St. Thomas'
Party	Candidate	Votes	%	±%
Labour	N. Wright*	637	69.4	+4.9
Conservative	J. Tilby	281	30.6	−4.9
Majority		356	38.8	+9.8
Turnout		918		
Labour hold		Swing		

=== Seedley ===
Seedley
Party	Candidate	Votes	%	±%
Labour	A. C. Casson	1,601	53.9	+8.2
Conservative	R. Stones*	1,372	46.1	−8.2
Majority		229	7.8	
Turnout		2,973		
Labour gain from Conservative		Swing		

=== Trinity ===
Trinity
Party	Candidate	Votes	%	±%
Labour	J. R. Jaffe	719	53.0	+12.4
Conservative	J. Jennings	638	47.0	−12.4
Majority		81	6.0	
Turnout		1,357		
Labour hold		Swing		

=== Weaste ===
Weaste
Party	Candidate	Votes	%	±%
Labour	B. K. Lappin	1,783	53.5	+7.3
Conservative	J. Hacking*	1,551	46.5	−7.3
Majority		232	7.0	
Turnout		3,334		
Labour gain from Conservative		Swing		
