= William (TV series) =

British television series 1962–1963

- Starring: Dennis Waterman
- Original language: English
- No. of series: 2
- No. of episodes: 12

Production
- Running time: 30 min. each

Original release
- Network: BBC
- Release: 1962 – 1963

William is a BBC television series based on the Just William series of books written by Richmal Crompton. It ran for two series from 1962 to 1963. 12 episodes were made in all, each of half an hour long. It was filmed in black and white.

All episodes were believed to have been wiped by the BBC, but in 2016 the British Film Institute announced it had recovered the second episode of the first series, William and the Leopard Hunter. All eleven other episodes of the comedy were listed as missing.

== Cast ==
- Dennis Waterman as William Brown in the first series
- Denis Gilmore as William Brown in the second series
- Christopher Witty as Ginger
