= The Big Pull =

1962 British TV sci-fi series

- Genre: Drama
- Written by: Robert Gould
- Directed by: Terence Dudley
- Starring: William Dexter; Ray Roberts; June Tobin
- Country of origin: Great Britain
- No. of seasons: 1
- No. of episodes: 6

Production
- Editor: Seymour Logie
- Production company: BBC

Original release
- Release: 9 June – 14 July 1962

The Big Pull is a BBC science-fiction series concerning an alien invasion of Earth.

The events occur during early space exploration. Earth came under attack by an invisible force, which took over humans in pairs; one disappears, one dies. The disappeared one emerges under alien control, and his face is now that of the one who died.

The fear grows palpable when it is realised that the number of victims is growing exponentially; the time between each attack halves each time, and the number of victims doubles. The hero, Sir Robert Nailer, realised this trend when he was following a van sporting the advertisement for a typewriter which read, "Twice the output in half the time".

It was realised that the aliens were exerting their power through the Radio Telescope facility, where all the deaths had taken place, and the only way to stop them was to destroy the base before the next attack, when the number of affected humans would exceed the number of staff there. Unfortunately, the bombing aircraft was late.

Again, unusually for the genre, the series ends with widespread panic as it is realised that every effort has failed, the scientists are dead, that the whole population of the Earth will be gone within hours, and there is nothing that can be done.

The series ran over six episodes, during the time that the first ventures into space by Russian and American astronauts were taking place. The series was screened in Australia in 1964. As of 2017, however, no episodes exist in the archives.
