= Don't Talk to Strange Men =

1962 British film by Pat Jackson

- British quad poster
- Directed by: Pat Jackson
- Screenplay by: Gwen Cherrell
- Produced by: Derick Williams
- Starring: Christina Gregg; Janina Faye; Cyril Raymond; Gillian Lind
- Cinematography: Stephen Dade
- Edited by: Helen Wiggins
- Production company: A Derick Williams Production
- Distributed by: Bryanston Films (UK)
- Release date: 1962 (UK)
- Running time: 65 min
- Country: United Kingdom
- Language: English
- Budget: £21,690

Don't Talk to Strange Men is a 1962 black and white British 'B' crime thriller film directed by Pat Jackson and starring Christina Gregg, Janina Faye, Cyril Raymond and Gillian Lind. The screenplay was by Gwen Cherrell.

== Plot ==
A driver gives a lift to a woman. He attacks her. Her body is later discovered by children playing in a hay shed.

Meanwhile, Jean Painter, a teenage schoolgirl, waits for a bus on a quiet country lane. She has been baby-sitting at The Chequers, the pub owned by her uncle Ron. The telephone in a nearby phone box rings and, curious, she answers it. She is fascinated by the conversation with an unknown man and agrees to chat again the next day. At home, she tells her younger sister Ann of the phone call, romantically envisaging what the caller might look like.

The next day at the same time and place the phone rings again and Jean eagerly answers. She falls in love with the man, but gives him a false name: Samantha.

On the third day the man does not call at the normal time. She does not take the bus when it comes, hoping that he will still call. However, she misses his eventual call when a passerby uses the phone box.

On the fourth day, the man calls, and is annoyed about her missing the previous day. He chats her up and says how much he loves her voice. They arrange to meet in person the next day. Worried about the newspaper report of the murdered girl, Jean's father bans her from going to The Chequers on the following night, and also bans Ann from attending a dance.

The next evening, Jean pretends to go into town with Ann to go to the cinema, but instead takes the bus to the rendezvous. Seeing a drunk wandering up the lane, she is scared. She runs into a field and hides in a shed. She daydreams about the man's voice.

Meanwhile, a man goes into The Chequers and orders a drink. He is the phone box man.

Realising how stupid she has been, Jean runs to The Chequers where she hears the man's voice and sees his face. She watches as he calls the phone box. Worried about Jean, Ann has left the cinema early and arrived at the phone box looking for her. When the phone rings, Ann answers but says little. She then phones for the police. Jean tells Ron the story and calls the phone box, telling Ann to hide, but it is too late – the man has arrived, and he opens the phone box door. Thinking that Ann is Samantha, he drags her to his car and races off. Moments later, Ron arrives in his car, gives chase and forces the man's car off the road. As Ron and the man fight, the police arrive.

== Cast ==
- Christina Gregg as Jean Painter
- Janina Faye as Ann Painter
- Cyril Raymond as Mr. Painter
- Gillian Lind as Mrs. Painter
- Conrad Phillips as Ron
- Dandy Nichols as Molly, bus conductor
- Gwen Nelson as Mrs. Mason
- Robin Hunter as man in sports car
- Bernadette Woodman as girl

== Production ==
The film was produced at Marylebone Film Studios and on location in Buckinghamshire.

== Critical reception ==
The Monthly Film Bulletin wrote: "The film takes an unconscionable time over the preliminaries and establishing the cloyingly cosy domestic background. But Pat Jackson creates an eerie feeling of suspense by playing up the susceptibility of the romantic girl (breathlessly played by Christina Gregg) and the remoteness of the rural setting. The climax is genuinely nerve-racking, though the cornering of the villain is an implausible rush job. The final scene has a nice touch of irony, and the approach to the subject is the more effective for being deliberately unhysterical."

In The Radio Times Guide to Films Tony Sloman gave the film 2/5 stars, writing: "This worthy little feature with a social message is more interesting now for its depiction of early 1960s Britain, but still has relevance today. Christina Griegg is the young girl in trouble after disobeying the instruction of the title, while Gilian Lind and Cyril Raymond are her very middle-class parents."
