= The Beauty Jungle =

1964 British film by Val Guest

- Theatrical release poster
- Directed by: Val Guest
- Written by: Val Guest; Robert Muller
- Produced by: Val Guest
- Starring: Ian Hendry; Janette Scott; Edmund Purdom
- Cinematography: Arthur Grant
- Edited by: Bill Lenny
- Music by: Laurie Johnson
- Distributed by: The Rank Organization (United Kingdom); Continental Distributing (United States)
- Release date: 28 June 1964; (world premiere)
- Running time: 110 minutes
- Country: United Kingdom
- Language: English

The Beauty Jungle (also known as Contest Girl) is a 1964 British film directed by Val Guest and starring Ian Hendry, Janette Scott, Ronald Fraser and Edmund Purdom. It was written by Guest and Robert Muller.

== Plot ==
Shirley lives in Bristol. While on a seaside holiday at Butlins holiday camp a young typist Shirley Freeman is persuaded by a local journalist Don MacKenzie to enter a beauty contest. When she wins, she decides to give up her previous career and life and take up entering beauty contests full-time. Her parents disown her.

Shirley comes second in a heat for the "Rose of England" contest, but her friend points out to the judges that the winner has not followed the rules and she is disqualified so Shirley wins by default, winning £300 and a trip to Monte Carlo. They enjoy the trip together, but Don changes the booking at the hotel from two single rooms to one double room. Whilst in Monte Carlo she enters yet another beauty contest, "Miss Trapeze", this is a chaotic contest set in a circus, but nevertheless she wins, winning 500NF. The contest organisers Mr Carrick and Mr Armand invite them to dinner.

Returning to Britain she does a photo-shoot in Torquay with photographer Walter Carey. She then enters the final of "Miss Rose of England" and wins, winning £1000.

She is then entered as "Miss England" in the "Miss Globe" contest held on the Cote d'Azur. Here Don has to stay at a different hotel and Shirley has to share a hotel room with Miss Peru, but she comes only 6th despite naively sleeping with one of the male judges the night before the contest. Disillusioned with the beauty profession she stops entering beauty contests completely.

Later on, after being required as reigning champion to judge a beauty contest in the UK, she sees that her younger sister Elaine has entered the contest and immediately walks away completely from the beauty profession and all of its hypocrisy and sordid publicity stunts.

== Cast ==
- Ian Hendry as Don Mackenzie
- Janette Scott as Shirley Freeman
- Ronald Fraser as Walter Carey
- Edmund Purdom as Rex Carrick
- Jean Claudio as Armand
- Kay Walsh as Mrs. Freeman
- Tommy Trinder as Charlie Dorton
- Norman Bird as Mr. Freeman
- Janina Faye as Elaine
- Aliza Gur as Miss Peru
- David Weston as Harry
- Peter Ashmore as Lucius
- Sid James as Butlin Judge (credited as Sydney James)
- Jacqueline Jones as Jean Watson
- Jackie White as Barbara Lawton
- Jerry Desmonde as swimming pool M.C.
- Alan Taylor as TV commentator
- Eve Eden as Angela Boynton
- Lionel Blair as Talk of The Town producer
- Francis Matthews as Taylor
- Nikki Peters as Cora
- Raymond Young as "Miss Globe" host
- Margaret Nolan as Caroline
- Arlette Dobson as Miss America
- Donna Pearson as Miss Sweden
- Sandy Sarjeant as Miss Spain
- Barbara von der Heyde as Miss Germany
- Paul Carpenter as American tourist
- Donald Hewlett as advertising man
- Rosemarie Frankland as herself
- Norman Hartnell, Lydia Russell, Duchess of Bedford, Stirling Moss, Linda Christian, and Joe Brown appear as themselves
- Tubby Hayes (himself)
- Harold Hood (himself)
- Spike Heatley (himself)
- Bobby Orr (himself)

== Production ==
Val Guest said "when the press found out I was doing a film about the beauty jungle in 1964 and it was printed in odd bits of press coverage I got a letter first of all from Eric Morley who demanded to be able to see the script and to point out to me I couldn't use Miss England, I couldn't use Miss Great Britain, Miss World, Miss Universe, any of that. I didn't answer that, it didn't call for an answer; then later when we'd gone ahead we got a letter from his solicitor wanting to see the script. I said no way could they see the script but I'd be delighted to invite them to the premiere. There was all niggling going on there, so we called it Miss English Rose... and it was Miss Globe instead of Miss World and Miss Universe."

Filming started 30 September 1964 under the title 32: 26: 36. It took place at Pinewood Studios and seven different locations, including Weston Super Mare, Bristol, Cannes, Nice and London. Shooting was completed by January 1964.

The cast included:

- the film's technical adviser, Alizia Gur, formerly Miss Israel;
- Jackie White, Miss United Kingdom 1962/63;
- Arlette Dobson, Miss England 1961;
- Susan Pratt, Miss England 1963;
- Margaret Bristow, Miss Modern Venus 1963: and
- Rosemarie Frankland, Miss World 1960.

== Reception ==
=== Box office ===
Guest said the film did "alright. We got our money back but we didn't break any records. It broke even. It was a shame because I thought it was a good entertaining picture, but I think we suffered from not having any top names."

=== Critical ===
Sight and Sound called it a "Muffled expose of the Beauty Queen racket".

Variety wrote "There's plenty of pulchritude in the beauty queens which directorwriter Val Guest has assembled in his cast, and some lively, if not over subtle, comedy in this yarn of a girl who gains quick inwards, but finds the going full of disillusionment and pitfalls. It is a sound booking for some audiences."

The Monthly Film Bulletin wrote: "Would-be exposé of the horrors and frauds of the beauty queen racket, which never quite makes the grade as either heavy romance, sociological document, personal tragedy, or even just fun. The dialogue is totally lacking in bite, a sizeable chunk of the footage is expended on interminably dreary beauty parades, and the film only springs to life momentarily in an overdone but amusingly awful contest in a tatty Monte Carlo circus. Ian Hendry gives a far better performance than his material warrants, and Edmund Purdom intervenes, convincingly enough, as a movie idol who recognises ruefully that he is little more than an inanimate sex-symbol."
