= Janina Faye =

British actress and director

- Born: Janina Faye Smigielski; 16 April 1948 (age 78); Hammersmith, London, England
- Occupations: Actress, director
- Years active: 1956–2000; 2007–2016
- Spouse: William Dexter (m. 1967; died 1974)

Janina Faye Smigielski (born 16 April 1948) is an English actress and director.

== Biography ==
=== Early life ===
Faye was born in Hammersmith, London, England, a daughter of Florence Louisa Jonathan and Jan Smigielski. Her father was a Polish pilot from No. 303 Squadron RAF during the Battle of Britain.

=== Career ===
Faye began her career as a child actress in 1956, and it includes theatre and television work in addition to many film appearances. She appeared in several major fantasy and horror films when she was young, such as Hammer Films' original version of Dracula (1958), as well as the same company’s Never Take Sweets from a Stranger (1960) and The Two Faces of Dr. Jekyll (1960). In 1961 she appeared on stage as Helen Keller in the William Gibson play The Miracle Worker, and in 1962 she appeared in the film thrillers Don't Talk to Strange Men and The Day of the Triffids.

In 1998, she teamed up with director Paul Cotgrove and Hammer co-star Ingrid Pitt to make the short British horror film Green Fingers, a story about a spinster whose garden has strange properties with an ability to grow anything, even things that are no longer living.

She often appears at signings.

== Filmography (selected) ==
Year	Title	Role	Notes
1956	Circus Friends	Minor role	Uncredited
1957	Sea Wife	Child on Ship	Uncredited
1957	No Time for Tears		
1957	The Story of Esther Costello	Esther Costello, as a child	
1957	Seven Thunders	French child	Uncredited
1958	Dracula	Tania	
1958	The Adventures of Hal 5	Moira	
1958	The Sheriff of Fractured Jaw	Young girl	Uncredited
1958	Floods of Fear	Young Girl	Uncredited
1959	Room at the Top	Young girl	Uncredited
1959	The Headless Ghost	Veronica	Uncredited
1959	Bobbikins	Bobbikins	Voice, Uncredited
1960	Never Take Sweets from a Stranger	Jean Carter	
1960	The Two Faces of Dr. Jekyll	Jane, deafmute child	Uncredited
1960	The Hands of Orlac	Child	Uncredited
1962	Don't Talk to Strange Men	Ann	
1962	The Day of the Triffids	Susan	
1964	The Beauty Jungle	Elaine Freeman	
1967	Bindle (One of Them Days)	Millie	
1969	The Smashing Bird I Used to Know	Susan	
1969	The Dance of Death	Judith	
1970	Please Sir!	Series 3 1 episode	
1973	John Keats: His Life and Death	Fanny Brawne	
1975–1983	Angels	2 guest roles	
1983–1996	The Bill	2 guest roles	
2008	Legends of Hammer Vampires (video)	as Herself	
2016	The One Show	as Herself	
