= H.M.S. Defiant =

- Original UK film poster
- Directed by: Lewis Gilbert
- Screenplay by: Nigel Kneale; Edmund H. North
- Based on: Mutiny; 1958 novel by Frank Tilsley
- Produced by: John Brabourne
- Starring: Alec Guinness; Dirk Bogarde; Anthony Quayle; Maurice Denham; Nigel Stock
- Cinematography: Christopher Challis
- Edited by: Peter R. Hunt
- Music by: Clifton Parker
- Production company: G.W. Films Ltd
- Distributed by: Columbia Pictures
- Release dates: 22 February 1962 (Premiere); 15 April 1962
- Running time: 101 minutes
- Country: United Kingdom
- Language: English
- Budget: $2 million

H.M.S. Defiant (released as Damn the Defiant! in the United States) is a 1962 British naval war film directed by Lewis Gilbert with a screenplay by Nigel Kneale from Frank Tilsley's 1958 novel Mutiny, and starring Alec Guinness, Dirk Bogarde, Anthony Quayle, Maurice Denham, and Nigel Stock. Shot in both CinemaScope and Technicolor, the plot concerns a mutiny aboard the fictitious title ship at around the time of the Spithead mutiny in 1797.

== Plot ==
In 1797, the humane Captain Crawford is in command of the frigate HMS Defiant during the French Revolutionary Wars. He soon finds himself in a battle of wills with his first officer, the sadistic and supercilious first lieutenant, Mr. Scott-Padget. The lieutenant believes that Crawford is too soft on his crew, and also disagrees with the captain's decision to follow his orders to sail to Corsica despite word that Napoleon's army has overrun much of Italy. Scott-Padget has powerful family connections, which he has used in the past to "beach" two previous commanding officers with whom he disagreed. Knowing that Crawford is helpless to intervene, Scott-Padget subjects the Captain's son, Midshipman Harvey Crawford, to excessive daily punishments so as to gain leverage over the captain.

Meanwhile, some of the crew, led by seaman Vizard, are preparing a written petition for better conditions, in conjunction with similar efforts throughout the British fleet. They eventually pledge nearly the entire crew.

In the Mediterranean, the Defiant encounters a French frigate escorting a merchant ship. After a sharp engagement, a boarding party from the Defiant captures the French frigate, and the merchantman surrenders. Crawford dispatches his son as part of the prize crew tasked to sail the captured merchantman to a British port, thereby placing him out of Scott-Padget's reach. Crawford tells Scott-Padget that bringing his son with him was a mistake, but now he's "put it right!" He further vows to take actions that will "astound" his second-in-command. Before long, Scott-Padget is confined to quarters as punishment for insubordination. His humiliation is compounded by the requirement that he appear on deck every two hours in full dress uniform, a punishment usually reserved for young midshipmen.

Soon, Defiant fights and captures a Venetian frigate, taking on many prisoners. Crawford is severely wounded in the action and eventually loses his arm. Discovered among the prisoners is a key aide to Napoleon, from whom the British learn important information about a planned invasion of Britain.

With Crawford incapacitated, Scott-Padget takes command, but his brutality goads the crew into a premature mutiny. Appealing to their patriotism, Crawford convinces Vizard and the other mutineers to sail for the main British fleet blockading Rochefort to warn them of the impending invasion. Crawford promises to intercede for the crew as best he can, on the condition that none of the officers are harmed.

As the Defiant reaches the fleet at Rochefort, they receive word that the main British fleet has already mutinied, with the Admiralty agreeing to all of the sailors' demands and granting an amnesty to those who took part. The crew's jubilation at the news is cut short when a hot-headed seaman, Evans, murders Scott-Padget. Realising that they are now all doomed to punishment as mutineers, an enraged Vizard kills Evans. Their only course now is to try to escape with the ship.

Just then, the French fleet sallies out from port, and a French fireship is sighted heading straight for the British flagship. As the only ship under sail, the Defiant has the unique opportunity to save the flagship. Once again, Crawford appeals to the crew's patriotism, making no promises but convincing them to intercept the fireship. Vizard is killed in the ensuing action, living just long enough to hear a message from the British admiral thanking Defiant for their honourable actions. The mutiny is over and HMS Defiant joins the fleet.

== Cast ==
- Alec Guinness as Captain Crawford
- Dirk Bogarde as Lieutenant Scott-Padget
- Anthony Quayle as Vizard
- Maurice Denham as Mr. Goss (ship's surgeon)
- Nigel Stock as Senior Midshipman Kilpatrick
- Richard Carpenter as Lieutenant Ponsonby
- Peter Gill as Lieutenant D'Arblay
- David Robinson as Midshipman Harvey Crawford
- Robin Stewart as Midshipman Pardoe
- Ray Brooks as Hayes
- Peter Greenspan as Johnson
- Tom Bell as Evans
- Murray Melvin as Percival Wagstaffe
- Victor Maddern as Bosun Dawlish
- Bryan Pringle as Marine Sergeant Kneebone
- Johnny Briggs as Wheatley
- Brian Phelan as Grimshaw
- Toke Townley as Silly Billy
- Declan Mulholland as Morrison
- Walter Fitzgerald as Admiral Jackson
- Joy Shelton as Mrs. Crawford
- Anthony Oliver as tavern leader
- Russell Napier as Flag Captain
- Michael Coles as Flag Lieutenant
- Andre Maranne as Colonel Giraud
- James Bolam as midshipman assisting in operation

== Reception ==
In a contemporary review for The New York Times, critic Bosley Crowther wrote: "The perennially popular topic of wooden ships and iron men, of eighteenth-century square-riggers, naval martinets and mutineers is handled with the kind of graphic splendor that should set a million boyish hearts aflame ... [Y]ou will know that you've sat through a picture that does not make much psychological sense but has the rich and rosy luster of a blood-drenched seafaring romance. ... So, if you're for naval roistering, here is your cup of rum."

Films and Filming ranked H.M.S. Defiant ninth among the most popular films in Britain for 1962.
