= 1962 in the United Kingdom =

Events from the year 1962 in the United Kingdom.

== Incumbents ==
- Monarch – Elizabeth II
- Prime Minister – Harold Macmillan (Conservative)

== Events ==
- January–April – An outbreak of smallpox spreading from Cardiff infects 45 people and kills 19 in South Wales; 900,000 people in the region are vaccinated against the disease.
- 2 January – BBC Television broadcasts the first episode of Z-Cars, noted as a realistic portrayal of the police force.
- 5 January – The first album on which The Beatles play, My Bonnie, as backing to Tony Sheridan (recorded last June in Hamburg), is released by Polydor.
- 11 January–12 February – Bradford smallpox outbreak of 1962.
- 15 January – UK weather reports begin to quote the temperature in degrees Celsius in addition to Fahrenheit.
- 18 January – Union-Castle Line ship RMS Transvaal Castle (1961) makes her maiden voyage Southampton–Durban, perhaps the last major British ship built to enter the regular passenger ocean liner trade.
- 22 January – James Hanratty goes on trial for the August 1961 A6 murder. He denies the murder of 36-year-old Michael Gregsten and the attempted murder of Mr Gregsten's mistress Valerie Storie, who is paralysed by a gunshot wound.
- 4 February – The Sunday Times becomes the first newspaper to print a colour supplement.
- 10 February – End of the Queen's 10th regnal year. From this year, Acts of Parliament are dated by calendar year.
- 12 February – Six members of the Committee of 100 of the Campaign for Nuclear Disarmament are found guilty of a breach of the Official Secrets Act.
- 16 February – The 430-ft high 275kV Tyne Crossing power lines collapse on the same day that the British highest wind speed of 177mph on Lowther Hill in south-west Scotland is recorded.
- 21 February – Margot Fonteyn and Rudolf Nureyev first dance together publicly, in a Royal Ballet performance of Giselle.
- 26 February – The Irish Republican Army officially calls off its Border Campaign in Northern Ireland.
- 1 March – British nuclear testing in the United States begins with "Pampas", Britain's first underground test, at the Nevada Test Site, the first of 24 critical tests up to 1991.
- 6 March – Accrington Stanley, members of the Football League Fourth Division, resign from the Football League due to huge debts.
- 7 March
  - National Economic Development Council first meets.
  - An outlier of the Ash Wednesday Storm of 1962 destroys the Cornish community of Wherrytown near Penzance.
- 13 March – 1962 Blackpool North by-election: the Blackpool North seat is retained by the Conservative Party.
- 14 March (Wednesday) – Parliamentary by-elections in England (the last to be held on a day other than Thursday):
  - 1962 Middlesbrough East by-election: the Middlesbrough East seat is retained by Labour.
  - 1962 Orpington by-election: Liberal Party candidate Eric Lubbock takes the Orpington seat in the outer London suburbs from the expected winner, Conservative candidate Peter Goldman, seen as the start of a Liberal revival in the UK.
- 29 March – Education Act 1962 requires local education authorities to pay the tuition fees of students attending full-time first degree (or comparable) courses and to provide them with a maintenance grant, superseding the former system of state scholarships.
- 2 April – Panda crossings are introduced (in London) but their complex sequences of pulsating and flashing lights cause confusion amongst drivers and pedestrians.
- 4 April – James Hanratty is hanged at HM Prison Bedford for the A6 murder, despite protests from many people who believe he is innocent, and the late introduction into his trial of witnesses who claim to have seen him in Rhyl, North Wales, on the day of the murder.
- 12 April – British New Wave film A Kind of Loving, directed by John Schlesinger, is released.
- 18 April – Commonwealth Immigrants Act in the United Kingdom removes free immigration from the citizens of member states of the Commonwealth of Nations, requiring proof of employment in the UK. This comes into effect on 1 July.
- 23 April – This year's Aldermaston March culminates in a 150,000-strong demonstration against proliferation of nuclear weapons in Hyde Park, London.
- 26 April – Ariel 1, the UK's first satellite, is launched from the United States.
- 27 April – Opinion polls show that less than half of voters now approve of Harold Macmillan as Prime Minister.
- 28 April – Ipswich Town win the Football League First Division title in their first season at that level.
- 5 May – Tottenham Hotspur retain the FA Cup with a 3–1 win over Burnley at Wembley Stadium, with goals from Jimmy Greaves, Bobby Smith and captain Danny Blanchflower.
- 8 May – The last trolleybuses in London are run.
- 11 May – Prince Charles starts at Gordonstoun school in Scotland.
- 25 May – The new Coventry Cathedral is consecrated. On 30 May, Benjamin Britten's War Requiem is premiered here.
- 26 May – Acker Bilk's 1961 instrumental recording "Stranger on the Shore" becomes the first British recording to reach number one in the US Billboard Hot 100.
- 31 May
  - The Northern Ireland general election again produces a large majority for the Ulster Unionist Party, winning 34 out of 51 seats, though the Nationalist Party gains two seats for a total of 9.
  - The British West Indies Federation is officially wound up (under terms of the UK West Indies Act of 18 April) due to internal dissention.
- 2 June
  - Britain's first legal casino opens in Brighton, Sussex.
  - Oxford United F.C., champions of the Southern League, are elected to the English Football League in place of bankrupt Accrington Stanley.
- 6 June – The Beatles play their first session at Abbey Road Studios in London, having signed with EMI's Parlophone label on 9 May.
- 14 June
  - BBC Television broadcasts the first episode of the sitcom Steptoe and Son, written by Galton and Simpson.
  - The UK joins 11 other European countries in an agreement to form the European Space Research Organisation, predecessor of the European Space Agency.
- 1 July – Another heavy smog develops over London.
- 3 July – Opening of Chichester Festival Theatre, Britain's first large modern theatre with a thrust stage. Laurence Olivier is the first artistic director.
- 11 July (01:00 GMT) – First live transatlantic television transmission, via the Telstar communications satellite and Goonhilly Satellite Earth Station, is received in the UK and broadcast by the BBC. An error at the ground station causes the initial images to be of poor quality. A full public broadcast is made on 23 July.
- 12 July – The Rolling Stones make their debut at London's Marquee Club, Number 165 Oxford Street, opening for Long John Baldry.
- 13 July – In what the press dubs "the Night of the Long Knives", the prime minister Harold Macmillan dismisses one-third of his Cabinet.
- 20 July – The world's first regular passenger hovercraft service is introduced between Rhyl in North Wales and Wallasey.
- 22 July – Advertising Standards Authority set up.
- 29 July – Race riots break out in Dudley, West Midlands.
- 31 July – A crowd assaults a rally of the right-wing Union Movement of Sir Oswald Mosley in London.
- 4 August – Cymdeithas yr Iaith Gymraeg, the Welsh Language Society, is founded.
- 6 August – Jamaica becomes independent from the United Kingdom.
- 12 August – The BMC ADO16 economy car series, best known as the Austin/Morris 1100, is launched; this becomes Britain's best selling car for most of the 1960s.
- 17 August – The Tornados' recording of Joe Meek's instrumental "Telstar" is released.
- 18 August – The Beatles play their first live engagement with the line-up of John, Paul, George and Ringo, at Hulme Hall, Port Sunlight.
- 23 August – John Lennon marries Cynthia Powell at an unpublicised register office ceremony at Mount Pleasant, Liverpool, with Paul McCartney as best man.
- 31 August
  - Trinidad and Tobago gains independence from the United Kingdom.
  - Mountaineers Chris Bonington and Ian Clough becomes the first Britons to climb the north face of the Eiger.
- 1 September – Channel Television, the ITV franchise for the Channel Islands, goes on air.
- 2 September – Glasgow Corporation Tramways runs its last tramcars in normal service, leaving the Blackpool tramway as the only remaining one in the UK.
- 6 September – Archaeologist Peter Marsden discovers the first of a set of Roman shipwrecks at Blackfriars in London, known as the Blackfriars Ships.
- 8–11 September – Last Gentlemen v Players cricket match played, at Scarborough, as the MCC abolishes the distinction between amateurs and professionals.
- 14 September – Wales West and North Television (Teledu Cymru) goes on air to the North and West Wales region, extending ITV to the whole of the United Kingdom.
- 20 September – The Ford Motor Company launches the Cortina, a family saloon costing £573 (equivalent to £12,500 in 2022) and similar in size to the Vauxhall Victor, Hillman Minx and Morris Oxford Farina.
- 21 September – First broadcast of the long-running television quiz programme University Challenge, made by Granada Television with Bamber Gascoigne as quizmaster.
- 1 October – Elizabeth Lane takes her seat as the first female county court judge.
- 5 October
  - Dr No, the first James Bond film, is premiered at the London Pavilion, with 32-year-old Scottish actor Sean Connery playing the lead, a British Secret Service agent.
  - The Beatles' first single in their own right, Love Me Do, is released by Parlophone. This version was recorded on 4 September at Abbey Road Studios in London with Ringo Starr as drummer.
- 9 October – Uganda gains independence from the United Kingdom.
- 17 October – The Beatles make their first televised appearance, on Granada television's north west local news programme People and Places.
- 21 October – The first American Folk Blues Festival European tour plays its only UK date at the Free Trade Hall, Manchester; artists include Sonny Terry, Brownie McGhee and T-Bone Walker. It will be influential on the British R&B scene, with the audience including Mick Jagger, Keith Richards and Brian Jones of The Rolling Stones with Jimmy Page, Paul Jones, John Mayall and other musicians, and with a second show filmed and shown on Independent Television.
- 22 October
  - John Vassall, a former clerical officer in naval intelligence, is sentenced to 18 years imprisonment after admitting to passing secret material to the Soviet Union.
  - Manchester Ringway Airport opens the first hub and pier terminal in Europe.
- 24 October – GCHQ's interception station at Scarborough is the first to detect that Soviet merchant ships implicated in the Cuban Missile Crisis are returning to their bases.
- 26 October – St Andrew's Hall, a concert hall in Glasgow, is destroyed in a fire thought to have been caused by a cigarette discarded during a Scotland versus Romania boxing match the previous day. The surviving facade is later incorporated into the Mitchell Library.
- 31 October – The United Nations General Assembly asks the United Kingdom to suspend enforcement of the new constitution in Southern Rhodesia (later Zimbabwe), but the constitution comes into effect on 1 November.
- November – John Charnley makes the world's first successful whole hip replacement operation at Wrightington Hospital, Wigan.
- 2 November – Greville Wynne, a British trader acting as a courier for MI6, is arrested by the KGB in Budapest and imprisoned in Moscow after confessing to espionage.
- 17 November – Seaham life-boat George Elmy capsizes entering harbour after service to coble Economy: all five crew and four of the five survivors are killed.
- 22 November – 1962 Chippenham by-election: the Conservatives are narrowly re-elected in Chippenham, Wiltshire, ahead of a challenge from the Liberals.
- 24 November – The first episode of influential satire show That Was the Week That Was, hosted by David Frost, is broadcast on BBC Television.
- 29 November – An agreement is signed between Britain and France to develop the Concorde supersonic airliner.
- 2–7 December – Severe smog in London causes numerous deaths.
- 6 December – The last permanent inhabitants leave the Scottish Island of Stroma.
- 9 December – Tanganyika (modern-day Tanzania) becomes a republic within the Commonwealth, with Julius Nyerere as president.
- 10 December
  - British molecular biologists Francis Crick and Maurice Wilkins, along with American James D. Watson, share the Nobel Prize in Physiology or Medicine "for their discoveries concerning the molecular structure of nucleic acids and its significance for information transfer in living material".
  - British biochemists Max Perutz and John Cowdery Kendrew share the Nobel Prize in Chemistry for their work in investigating the structure of haem-containing proteins.
  - David Lean's film Lawrence of Arabia released.
- 16 December – Anglo–French talks regarding the UK's admission to the European Economic Community end in stalemate.
- 19 December – Britain acknowledges the right of Nyasaland (later Malawi) to secede from the Central African Federation.
- 21 December – Nassau Agreement: Britain agrees to buy the Polaris missile system from the United States.
- 22 December
  - "Big Freeze" in Britain: no frost-free nights until 5 March 1963.
  - "Telstar", by The Tornados, becomes the first single by a British group to reach No. 1 on the US charts, predating The Beatles by 13 months.
- 30 December – United Nations troops occupy the last rebel positions in Katanga; Moise Tshombe moves to Southern Rhodesia.

=== Undated ===
- Britain's motorway network expands with the completion of the first phases of the M5 between Birmingham and north Gloucestershire and the M6 bypassing Stafford.
- Mirror class introduced for dinghy sailing.
- Golden Wonder introduce flavoured crisps for the first time to the UK market, with cheese and onion.

== Publications ==
- The anthology The New Poetry edited by Al Alvarez.
- Anthony Burgess's novel A Clockwork Orange.
- Agatha Christie's Miss Marple novel The Mirror Crack'd from Side to Side.
- Len Deighton's first novel The IPCRESS File.
- Ian Fleming's James Bond novel The Spy Who Loved Me.
- Dick Francis' first novel Dead Cert.
- Eric Hobsbawm's book The Age of Revolution: Europe 1789–1848.
- Aldous Huxley's novel Island.
- P. D. James' first novel Cover Her Face.
- Doris Lessing's novel The Golden Notebook.
- David Lodge's novel Ginger You're Barmy.
- Anthony Sampson's study Anatomy of Britain.
- Peter Townsend's report The Last Refuge: a survey of residential institutions and homes for the aged in England and Wales.

== Births ==
=== January – April ===
- January – Richard Leonard, Leader of the Scottish Labour Party (2017-21).
- 3 January – Guy Pratt, English musician and songwriter
- 4 January – Robin Guthrie, Scottish guitarist and producer (Cocteau Twins)
- 5 January – Andrew Rawnsley, English journalist and broadcaster
- 11 January
  - Chris Bryant, politician
  - Melanie Hill, actress
  - Brian Moore, English rugby union player
- 20 January – Sophie Thompson, English actress
- 25 January – Emma Freud, English broadcaster and cultural commentator
- 28 January – Hamish McColl, comedian, writer and actor
- 2 February – Andy Fordham, English darts player (died 2021)
- 4 February – Stephen Hammond, English banker and politician
- 7 February – Eddie Izzard, British actor and comedian
- 8 February
  - Malorie Blackman, British author
  - Daniel Levy, English businessman
- 12 February – Jimmy Kirkwood, field hockey player
- 13 February – Hugh Dennis, British actor, comedian and writer (The Now Show)
- 17 February – Sarah Wollaston, physician and politician
- 21 February
  - Vanessa Feltz, British television presenter
  - Randy Lerner, American entrepreneur, owner of Aston Villa F.C.
- 25 February – John Lanchester, British journalist and novelist
- 26 February – Pen Hadow, Arctic explorer
- 4 March
  - Simon Bisley, British comic book artist
  - Paul Canoville, English footballer
- 9 March
  - Richard Quest, English television anchor and presenter
  - Pete Wishart, Scottish singer and politician
- 12 March – Graham Stuart, British Conservative politician, MP for Beverley and Holderness
- 17 March – Clare Grogan, Scottish actress and singer
- 23 March – Steve Redgrave, English rower
- 26 March – Sarah Mullally (née Bowser), Chief Nursing Officer for England, later first woman Archbishop of Canterbury
- 27 March – John O'Farrell, British author and broadcaster
- April – Sarah Gilbert, English vaccinologist
- 1 April – Phillip Schofield, British television presenter
- 9 April – Imran Sherwani, British field hockey player (died 2025)
- 15 April
  - Alex Crawford, English journalist
  - Nick Kamen, English singer-songwriter, musician and model (died 2021)
- 19 April – Dorian Yates, English professional bodybuilder
- 22 April
  - Ann McKechin, Scottish Labour politician, MP for Glasgow North
  - Jeff Minter, video game designer and programmer
- 23 April – John Hannah, Scottish actor
- 24 April
  - Roald Bradstock, English javelin thrower
  - Stuart Pearce, English football player and manager
- 26 April – Colin Anderson, English footballer
- 29 April – Polly Samson, English journalist and writer

=== May – August ===
- 2 May – Jimmy White, British snooker player
- 6 May – Tom Brake, British Liberal Democrat politician, MP for Carshalton and Wallington
- 9 May
  - Dave Gahan, English singer (Depeche Mode)
  - Paul Heaton, English singer-songwriter
- 14 May – Ian Astbury, British singer (The Cult)
- 17 May
  - Craig Ferguson, Scottish actor and television presenter
  - Alan Johnston, journalist
  - Aled Roberts, Welsh politician (died 2022)
- 20 May – Claire Horton, charity executive
- 26 May – Black, English singer-songwriter (died 2016)
- 29 May – Perry Fenwick, English actor
- 6 June – Mark Bright, English footballer, radio presenter and television pundit
- 8 June – Nick Rhodes, English rock keyboardist (Duran Duran)
- 13 June – Mark Frankel, actor (died 1996)
- 15 June – Chris Morris, English comedian, writer, director, actor, voice actor and producer
- 25 June – Phill Jupitus, comedian and broadcaster
- 27 June – Michael Ball, singer
- 29 June – Amanda Donohoe, English actress
- 30 June – Julianne Regan, singer/songwriter
- 1 July – Dominic Keating, English actor
- 4 July – Neil Morrissey, English actor
- 12 July – Dean Wilkins, English football manager
- 21 July – Victor Adebowale, Baron Adebowale, social entrepreneur
- 30 July – Lavinia Greenlaw, poet and novelist
- 1 August – Robert Clift, Welsh field hockey player
- 2 August – Lee Mavers, English musician
- 7 August – Doon Mackichan, British actress and comedian
- 9 August – Yinka Shonibare, artist
- 11 August – John Micklethwait, English journalist, editor-in-chief of The Economist
- 13 August – Heidi Thomas, screenwriter and playwright
- 20 August – Sophie Aldred, British actress and television presenter
- 23 August – Shaun Ryder, English musician, singer-songwriter and actor
- 24 August – Ali Smith, writer
- 30 August – Alexander Litvinenko, British citizen, previously KGB colonel and FSB lieutenant-colonel (killed 2006)

=== September – December ===
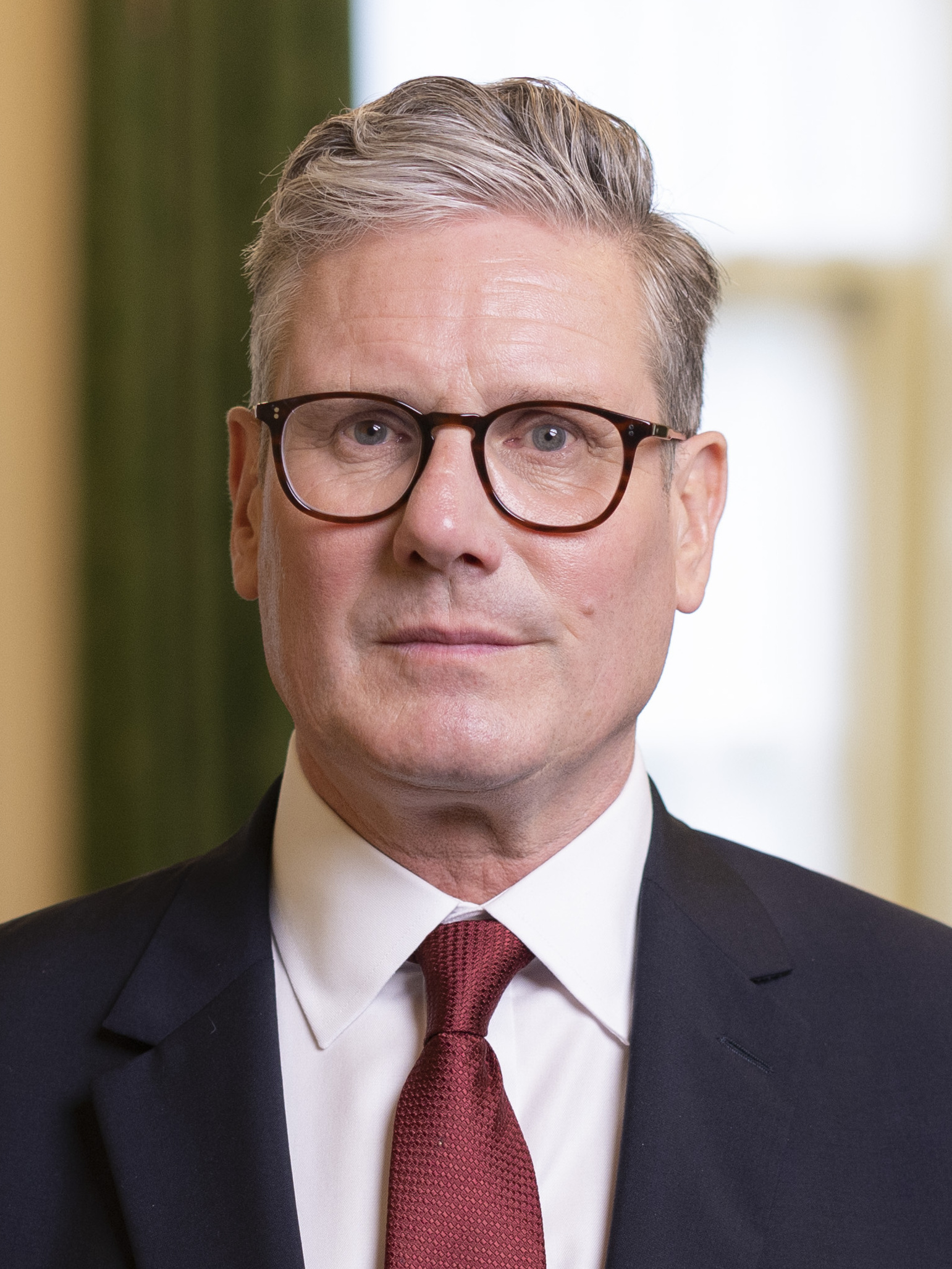
Keir Starmer

- 2 September – Keir Starmer, Prime Minister of the United Kingdom from 2024 to 2026
- 5 September – Peter Wingfield, Welsh actor
- 8 September – Daljit Dhaliwal, British newsreader and television presenter
- 15 September – Steve Punt, British actor, comedian and writer (The Now Show)
- 18 September – John Fashanu, English football player and commentator
- 21 September – Nick Knowles, English television presenter
- 24 September
  - Ally McCoist, Scottish footballer and television pundit and A Question of Sport team captain
  - Mike Phelan, English footballer and football coach
- 26 September – Tracey Thorn, British singer
- 30 September – Tony Morris, newsreader (d. 2020)
- October – Micky Flanagan, comedian
- 5 October – Caron Keating, television presenter (died 2004)
- 7 October – Micky Flanagan, English comedian
- 8 October – Richard Lintern, English actor
- 11 October
  - Nicola Bryant, actress
  - Jacqueline de Rojas, tech entrepreneur
- 14 October
  - Trevor Goddard, actor (died 2003)
  - Amanda Noar, English actress, director and choreographer
- 18 October – Naive John, Stuckist artist and figurative painter
- 19 October – Claude Callegari, English YouTube personality (d. 2021)
- 20 October
  - Boothby Graffoe, born James Rogers, comedian, singer-songwriter and playwright
  - Hugh Montgomery, physician
- 25 October – Nick Hancock, British actor and television presenter
- 26 October – Cary Elwes, English actor
- 3 November
  - Marilyn, born Peter Robinson, Jamaican-born pop singer
  - Jacqui Smith, English Labour politician
- 11 November – Alan Yau, Hong Kong-born restaurateur (Wagamama food chain)
- 12 November – Mariella Frostrup, journalist and television presenter
- 15 November – Maggie O'Neill, actress
- 21 November – Alan Smith, footballer
- 24 November – John Kovalic, Anglo-American cartoonist
- 27 November
  - Samantha Bond, actress
  - Davey Boy Smith, pro wrestler (died 2002)
- 29 November – Ronny Jordan, guitarist (died 2014)
- 2 December – Steve Huison, actor
- 3 December – Richard Bacon, British Conservative politician, MP for South Norfolk
- 6 December
  - Colin Salmon, actor
  - Ben Watt, musician, singer, DJ
- 7 December – Jeffrey Donaldson, Northern Irish politician, leader of the Democratic Unionist Party
- 17 December – Paul Dobson, English footballer (d. 2026)
- 22 December – Ralph Fiennes, British actor
- 31 December – Heather McCartney, born Heather See, adopted daughter of Sir Paul McCartney

=== Unknown dates ===
- Michele Dougherty, scientist

== Deaths ==
- 16 January – R. H. Tawney, English historian and social critic (born 1880)
- 26 January – George Jeffreys, Welsh Pentecostal (born 1889)
- 13 February – Hugh Dalton, Labour politician, Chancellor of the Exchequer (1945–1947) (born 1887)
- 16 March – Fred Pentland, footballer and coach (born 1883)
- 23 March – Clement Davies, Welsh Liberal politician (born 1884)
- 4 April – James Hanratty, murderer, one of the last people to be hanged in the UK (born 1936)
- 10 April – Stuart Sutcliffe, English artist and musician (The Beatles) (born 1940)
- 19 April – Sir Harold Yarrow, 2nd Baronet, industrialist (born 1884)
- 21 April – Sir Frederick Handley Page, English aircraft manufacturer (born 1885)
- 30 April – Sir Jameson Adams, Antarctic explorer, Royal Navy officer and civil servant (born 1880)
- 5 May – Ernest Tyldesley, English cricketer (born 1889)
- 2 June – Vita Sackville-West, English writer and landscape gardener (born 1892)
- 12 June – John Ireland, English composer (born 1879)
- 13 June – Sir Eugene Goossens, English composer (born 1893)
- 21 July – G. M. Trevelyan, English historian (born 1876)
- 27 July – Richard Aldington, English poet (born 1892)
- 15 August – Bob McIntyre, Scottish motorcycle racer (born 1928; died of injuries received in motorcycle race)
- 5 September – Roy MacNairy, English cricketer (born 1904)
- 7 September – Graham Walker, English motorcycle racer (born 1896)
- 23 September
  - Louis de Soissons, Canadian-born architect (born 1890)
  - Patrick Hamilton, English dramatist (born 1904)
- 30 September – Sir Bernard Rawlings, British admiral (born 1889)
- 21 October – Hugh Franklin, English activist for women's suffrage (born 1889)
- 4 November – Saxon Sydney-Turner, English civil servant, eccentric, member of the Bloomsbury Group (born 1880)
- 5 November – Percy Cudlipp, Welsh-born journalist (born 1905)
- 15 December – Charles Laughton, English actor and director (born 1899)
- 21 December – Gary Hocking, Welsh motorcycle racer (born 1937; died in automobile racing accident)
- December – Ethel Carnie Holdsworth, English working class novelist and campaigner (born 1886)

== See also ==
- 1962 in British music
- 1962 in British television
- List of British films of 1962
- 1962 United Kingdom local elections
