= 1962 Edinburgh Corporation election =

Local election in Scotland

- 1 May 1962

23 of the 69 seats to the Edinburgh Corporation 35 seats needed for a majority
	First party	Second party	Third party
Party	Progressives	Labour	Liberal
Last election	38	28	2
Seats before	38	29	2
Seats won	11	9	3
Seats after	34	30	5
Seat change	▼4	▲1	▲3
Popular vote	44,757	47,559	26,579
Percentage	36.3%	38.5%	21.5%
- Results by ward.
Council control before election
Progressives
Council control after election
No overall control

An election to the Edinburgh Corporation was held on 1 May 1962, alongside municipal elections across Scotland. Of the councils 69 seats, 23 were up for election.

After the election Edinburgh Corporation was composed of 34 Progressives, 30 Labour councillors, and 5 Liberals. The Progressives lost their overall majority on the council.

== Aggregate results ==
Edinburgh Corporation election, 1962
Party	Seats	Gains	Losses	Net gain/loss	Seats %	Votes %	Votes	+/−
Labour	11	1	0	▲1	47.8	38.5	47,559	
Progressives	9	0	4	▼4	37.5	36.3	44,757	
Liberal	3	3	0	▲3	13.0	21.5	26,580	
Unionist	0	0	0	Steady	0.0	2.7	3,278	
Communist	0	0	0	Steady	0.0	0.8	929	
Union Movement	0	0	0	Steady	0.0	0.8	929	

== Ward results ==
Location of Broughton ward

Broughton
Party	Candidate	Votes	%
Progressives	Gottleb A. Theurer	1,839	
Liberal	Violet MacInnes	1,833	
Majority		6	
Turnout			28.94
Progressives hold			

Location of Calton ward

Calton
Party	Candidate	Votes	%
Labour	James S. Cook	2,132	
Progressives	Josephine M. Dickson	2,120	
Majority		15	
Turnout			36.80
Labour gain from Progressives			

Location of Central Leith ward

Central Leith
Party	Candidate	Votes	%
Labour	Ewen G. Bethune	2,970	
Progressives	Lindsay Wilkie	1,185	
Communist	Theodore C. Taylor	193	
Majority		1,785	
Turnout			34.66
Labour hold			

Location of Colinton ward

Colinton
Party	Candidate	Votes	%
Progressives	Herbert A. Brechin	4,089	
Progressives	Maurice F. Ferry	3,793	
Labour	Harold Fauxwell	2,409	
Labour	Sylvia Dorothy Renilson	2,297	
Majority		394	
Turnout			36.99
Progressives hold			
Progressives hold			

Location of Corstorphine ward

Corstorphine
Party	Candidate	Votes	%
Liberal	Ronald S. Grant	3,660	
Progressives	David Kyles	3,361	
Majority		297	
Turnout			45.16
Liberal gain from Progressives			

Location of Craigentinny ward

Craigentinny
Party	Candidate	Votes	%
Labour	George Drummond	3,992	
Progressives	Henry Dundas	1,946	
Majority		2,046	
Turnout			39.93
Labour hold			

Location of Craigmillar ward

Craigmillar
Party	Candidate	Votes	%
Labour	Donald F. Renton	2,619	
Communist	Michael D'Arcy	175	
Majority		2,444	
Turnout			28.19
Labour hold			

Location of George Square ward

George Square
Party	Candidate	Votes	%
Progressives	William Simpson-Bell	1,858	
Liberal	John G. Gray	1,744	
Labour	Owen Hand	834	
Majority			
Turnout			
Progressives hold			

Location of Gorgie-Dalry ward

Gorgie-Dalry
Party	Candidate	Votes	%
Labour	Florence A. R. Strachan	3,038	
Progressives	William W. Gilmour	1,463	
Communist	Irene Swan	176	
Majority		1,575	
Turnout			32.65
Labour hold			

Location of Holyrood ward

Holyrood
Party	Candidate	Votes	%
Labour	Norman F. McQueen	1,987	
Communist	John Ashton	212	
Majority		1,772	
Turnout			23.51
Labour hold			

Location of Liberton ward

Liberton
Party	Candidate	Votes	%
Labour	M. Mackenzie	4,849	
Progressives	Enid Fraser	3,240	
Majority		1,612	
Turnout			40.69
Labour hold			

Location of Merchiston ward

Merchiston
Party	Candidate	Votes	%
Liberal	Robert L. Smith	2,939	
Progressives	Vera M. Carmichael	2,222	
Majority		717	
Turnout			44.50
Liberal gain from Progressives			

Location of Morningside ward

Morningside
Party	Candidate	Votes	%
Progressives	John Fitzpatrick	3,439	
Liberal	James B. Crossland	2,010	
Majority		1,429	
Turnout			41.05
Progressives hold			

Location of Murrayfield-Cramond ward

Murrayfield-Cramond
Party	Candidate	Votes	%
Progressives	Robert M. Knox	3,176	
Liberal	Melville MacIntyre	2,364	
Labour	John Keddie	1,399	
Majority		810	
Turnout			41.60
Progressives hold			

Location of Newington ward

Newington
Party	Candidate	Votes	%
Liberal	William G. Henderson	3,363	
Unionist	D. Drummond-Young	3,281	
Labour	John M. Simpson	1,140	
Majority		82	
Turnout			47.85
Liberal gain from Progressives			

Location of Pilton ward

Pilton
Party	Candidate	Votes	%
Labour	Catherina T. Nealon	5,222	
Liberal	Desmond V. S. Williams	1,503	
Communist	Charlie McManus	170	
Majority		3,713	
Turnout			39.58
Labour hold			

Location of Portobello ward

Portobello
Party	Candidate	Votes	%
Progressives	Alfred H. Hunt	2,928	
Labour	Robert G. Blanche	2,414	
Liberal	John M. Farquhar	2,056	
Majority		514	
Turnout			40.58
Progressives hold			

Location of Sighthill ward

Sighthill
Party	Candidate	Votes	%
Labour	James Ross	3,929	
Liberal	John Lisman	1,929	
Majority		1,998	
Turnout			38.29
Labour hold			

Location of South Leith

South Leith
Party	Candidate	Votes	%
Labour	Walter S. Dalgleish	3,860	
Progressives	Eric Walker Hall	3,153	
Majority		706	
Turnout			51.19
Labour hold			

Location of St Andrews ward

St. Andrews
Party	Candidate	Votes	%
Progressives	Lawrence S. Miller	1,907	
Labour	Anna F. Flockhart	930	
Union Movement	Stanley E. Wallace	280	
Majority		977	
Turnout			28.56
Progressives hold			

Location of St Bernards ward

St. Bernards
Party	Candidate	Votes	%
Progressives	Rhoda E. Paul	3,362	
Liberal	Marion M. Ritchie	1,931	
Labour	Ian McLauchlan	1,788	
Majority		1,431	
Turnout			40.19
Progressives hold			

Location of St Giles ward

St. Giles
Party	Candidate	Votes	%
Labour	Margaret B. Smith	2,052	
Progressives	Brenda A. W. Pope	959	
Majority		1,093	
Turnout			23.74
Labour hold			

Location of West Leith ward

West Leith
Party	Candidate	Votes	%
Progressives	Duncan M. Weatherstone	2,512	
Liberal	Peter E. Taylor	1,244	
Majority		1,268	
Turnout		3,756	31.66
Progressives hold			
