= Kenneth Griffith =

Welsh actor (1921–2006)

- Griffith in the 1976 BBC production Give Me Liberty or Give Me Death
- Born: Kenneth Reginald Griffiths; 12 October 1921; Tenby, Pembrokeshire, Wales
- Died: 25 June 2006 (aged 84); London, England
- Occupations: Actor, television producer, television presenter
- Years active: 1937–2003
- Spouse(s): Joan Stock (divorced); Doria Noar (divorced); Carol Hagar (divorced)
- Children: 5

Kenneth Griffith (born Kenneth Reginald Griffiths; 12 October 1921 – 25 June 2006) was a Welsh actor and documentary filmmaker. His outspoken views made him a controversial figure, especially when presenting documentaries which have been called "among the most brilliant, and controversial, ever made in Britain".

== Early life ==
He was born Kenneth Griffiths in Tenby, Pembrokeshire, Wales. His parents separated and left Tenby six months after his birth, leaving him with his paternal grandparents, Emily and Ernest, who adopted him. His grandparents were staunch Wesleyan Methodists who taught him to question everything; he attended the local Wesleyan Methodist chapel three times every Sunday, and became a lively rugby union scrum-half.

He passed the 11-plus and attended Greenhill Grammar School in Tenby, where he met English literature teacher Evelyn Ward, who recognised his writing and acting talent. Before Kenneth left school, his headmaster J. T. Griffith suggested that he drop the "s" from his surname so it would sound less English.

== Career ==
Griffith left school and moved to Cambridge in 1937, taking a job at an ironmonger's weighing nails. This lasted only a day, and proved to be the only job he ever had outside the acting world. Also in 1937, he made his first professional acting appearance when he was cast by Peter Hoare as Cinna the Poet in a modern-dress version of Julius Caesar at the Cambridge Festival Theatre.

He became a regular jobbing repertory actor, making his West End theatre debut in 1938 with a small part in Thomas Dekker's The Shoemaker's Holiday.

Griffith was conscripted into the Royal Air Force during World War II. Before training in Canada, he returned to see his grandparents in Tenby, who, at his request, gave him an English translation of Hitler's book, Mein Kampf so he could better understand the origins of the war. He caught scarlet fever while on his training and was invalided out of the service in 1942, which resulted in his taking up stamp collecting. The first stamp he collected was the Siege of Ladysmith, South Africa.

In 1941, he made his debut in the first of more than 80 films, being Love on the Dole. He joined the Liverpool, Lancashire-relocated Old Vic, and in repertory.

He appeared in many British films between the 1940s and 1980s, notably as Archie Fellows in The Shop at Sly Corner, Jenkins in Only Two Can Play (1962), the wireless operator Jack Phillips on board the Titanic in A Night to Remember (1958), in the crime caper Track the Man Down (1955) and especially in the comedies of the Boulting brothers, including Private's Progress (1956) and I'm All Right Jack (1959). Other notable film roles included the murderous paedophile Seely in Revenge (1971), the gay medic Witty in The Wild Geese (1978) and a whimsical mechanic in The Sea Wolves (1980).

He appeared in the episodes "The Girl Who Was Death" and "Fall Out" of the 1967–68 TV series The Prisoner. Subsequent TV appearances included episodes of Minder and Lovejoy, and critically acclaimed performances in War and Peace (1963), The Perils of Pendragon, Clochemerle and The Bus to Bosworth, where his personification of a Welsh schoolteacher out on a field trip won him many accolades back in his homeland of Wales.

His later film roles included the "mad old man" in Four Weddings and a Funeral (1994), Reverend Jones in The Englishman Who Went Up a Hill But Came Down a Mountain (1995) and the minister in Very Annie Mary (2001).

== Documentaries and political activity ==
In 1965, Huw Wheldon and the director of BBC2, David Attenborough, asked Griffith if he would like to make a film for the BBC on any subject that he chose. This resulted in a series of BBC films on subjects as diverse as the Boer War in Soldiers of the Widow (1967), Cecil Rhodes in A Touch of Churchill, a Touch of Hitler (1971), the controversial story of Thomas Paine in The Most Valuable Englishman Ever, David Ben-Gurion (The Light), Napoleon Bonaparte (The Man on the Rock), Pandit Nehru, Roger Casement (Heart of Darkness, 1992) and on one occasion a film commissioned by Thames Television on the story of the Three Wise Men of the New Testament, A Famous Journey (1979). Griffith was expelled from Iran by the country's Foreign Minister while making the documentary.

In 1973, Griffith made a documentary film about the life and death of Irish military and political leader Michael Collins titled Hang Up Your Brightest Colours (a line taken from a letter from George Bernard Shaw to one of Collins' sisters after Collins' assassination) for ATV, but the Independent Broadcasting Authority did not permit it to be screened (it was not shown until the BBC broadcast it in 1993).

In 1974, for a programme titled Curious Journey, he interviewed nine surviving IRA members from the Irish revolutionary period; they were Maire Comerford, Joseph Sweeney, Sean Kavanagh, John O'Sullivan, Brigid Lyons Thornton, Sean Harling, Martin Walton, David Neligan and Tom Barry. His sympathetic portrayal caused concern in the context of the Northern Ireland Troubles, and ATV boss Sir Lew Grade decided to withdraw the film, which was not shown publicly until 1994. In response Griffith made a documentary, The Public's Right to Know, for Thames TV. He was allowed to buy back Curious Journey, as long as he did not mention who had commissioned it (the Welsh TV company HTV).

At one point in his career, Griffith accused the anti-censorship group Index of censoring him by delaying the publication of two book reviews he had written for its magazine. The political troubles left him "a frustrated and bemused figure". Screenonline described Griffith as "a world class documentary film-maker" who knew that "refusing to compromise his views has damaged his career".

His autobiography, The Fool's Pardon, was published in 1994 by Little, Brown. BBC Wales presented a retrospective season of five of his documentaries in 1993, including the suppressed Michael Collins work, opening the season with a biographical study of Griffith called The Tenby Poisoner in which Peter O'Toole, Martin McGuinness and Jeremy Isaacs paid tribute. BBC Wales screened a film on Griffith's life in the "Welsh Greats" Series Two, shown in 2008. In 1994, Griffith was given a Cymru lifetime achievement award by BAFTA.

A Boer War historian, Griffith was sympathetic to the Afrikaners in South Africa. His documentary, Emily Hobhouse: The Englishwoman (1984), sympathised with Afrikaner women and children over their brutal treatment during the war, which was suppressed by the British media at the time. He also made a BBC2 documentary on runner Zola Budd, which purported to reveal injustices done to her by left-wing demonstrators and organisations during a tour of England in 1988.

He named his home (110 Englefield Road, Islington, London) as Michael Collins' House. In later life, Griffith said: "In my time I've been accused of being a Marxist, a fascist, a traitor and, probably worst in most people's eyes, inconsistent. I was a radical Socialist. I'm now a radical Tory. It has been a very painful journey".

== Personal life ==
Griffith was married and divorced three times, and had five children:

- Joan Stock (one son)
- Doria Noar (one daughter, actress/theatre historian Eva Griffith)
- Carole Haggar (one daughter, two sons)

== Death and burial ==
Griffith died in London on 25 June 2006, aged 84. His coffin was decorated with the flags of Wales, Israel and the Irish tricolour. Griffith was interred beside his grandparents, Emily and Ernest in the churchyard adjoining St Nicholas and St Teilo Church in Penally.

== Legacy ==
Tenby Museum and Art Gallery in Pembrokeshire houses an archive of Griffith's papers and documentaries, and a cabinet containing a collection of personal memorabilia.

== Filmography ==
Year	Title	Role	Notes
1940	Channel Incident	Johnnie	
1941	The Farmer's Wife	George Smerdon	
1941	Love on the Dole	Harry's Pal in Billiard Hall	Uncredited
1942	The Black Sheep of Whitehall	Butcher's Boy	Uncredited
1942	Hard Steel	Dixon	
1942	The Forest Rangers	Ranger	
1942	The Great Mr. Handel		Uncredited
1943	Young and Willing	Older Actor	Uncredited
1947	The Shop at Sly Corner	Archie Fellows	
1947	Fame Is the Spur	Wartime Miners' Representative	Uncredited
1948	Bond Street	Len Phillips	
1949	Forbidden	Johnny	
1949	Helter Skelter	Nick Martin's BBC Colleague	Uncredited
1949	Blue Scar	Thomas Williams	
1950	Waterfront	Maurice Bruno	
1951	High Treason	Jimmy Ellis	
1953	36 Hours	Henry Slosson	
1954	The Green Carnation	Nobby	
1955	The Prisoner	Secretary	
1955	Track the Man Down	Ken Orwell	
1956	Private's Progress	Private Dai Jones	
1956	1984	Prisoner	
1956	The Baby and the Battleship	Sub-Lieutenant	
1956	Tiger in the Smoke	Crutches	
1957	Brothers in Law	Hearse driver	
1957	Lucky Jim	Cyril Johns	
1957	The Naked Truth	Porter	
1957	Blue Murder at St Trinian's	Charlie Bull	
1958	A Night to Remember	Wireless Operator John 'Jack' Phillips	
1958	Chain of Events	Clarke	
1958	The Man Upstairs	Mr. Pollen	
1958	The Two-Headed Spy	Adolf Hitler	
1959	Tiger Bay	Choirmaster	
1959	Carlton-Browne of the F.O.	Griffiths	Uncredited
1959	I'm All Right Jack	Dai	
1959	Libel	Fitch	
1959	Expresso Bongo	Charlie	Uncredited
1960	Circus of Horrors	Martin	
1960	A French Mistress	Mr. Meade	
1960	Suspect	Dr. Shole	
1960	Snowball	Phil Hart	
1961	Payroll	Monty	
1961	Rag Doll	Wilson	
1961	The Frightened City	Wally Smith	
1962	Only Two Can Play	Ieuan Jenkins	
1962	The Painted Smile	Kleinie	
1962	We Joined the Navy	Orator	
1963	Heavens Above!	Rev. Owen Thomas	
1965	Rotten to the Core	Lenny the Dip	
1967	The Whisperers	Mr. Weaver	
1967	The Bobo	Pepe Gamazo	
1968	Decline and Fall... of a Birdwatcher	Mr. Church	
1968	The Lion in Winter	Strolling Player	
1968	Great Catherine	Naryshkin	
1969	The Assassination Bureau	Monsieur Popescu	
1970	The Gamblers	Broadfoot	
1971	Revenge	Seely	
1973	The House in Nightmare Park	Ernest Henderson	
1974	Callan	Waterman	
1974	S*P*Y*S	Lippet	
1976	Sky Riders	Wasserman	
1977	Why Shoot the Teacher	Inspector Woods	
1978	The Wild Geese	Arthur Witty	
1980	The Sea Wolves	Wilton	
1982	Who Dares Wins	Biship Crick	
1982	Remembrance	Joe	
1994	Four Weddings and a Funeral	Mad Old Man	
1995	The Englishman Who Went up a Hill but Came down a Mountain	Reverend Jones	
2001	Very Annie Mary	Minister	

== Television ==
Year	Title	Role	Notes
1953-1959	BBC Sunday Night Theatre	Various	4 episodes
1956-1963	ITV Play of the Week	Various	7 episodes
1957-1962	Armchair Theatre	Various	4 episodes
1960-1963	BBC Sunday-Night Play	Various	3 episodes
1960	International Detective	Gaspare	Episode: "The Winthrop Case"
1962	Thirty-Minute Theatre	Jack Price	Episode: "Bearer of Bad News"
1963	ITV Television Playhouse	Lambke	Episode: "To Bury Caesar"
1964	Festival	Mr. Jones	Episode: "The Inner World of Miss Vaughan"
1964	Drama 61-67	Szepsi	Episode: "Drama '64: A Memory of October"
1966	The Wednesday Play	Mr. Jones	Episode: "A Walk in the Sea"
1967	Danger Man	Richards	Episode: "Shinda Shima"
1968	The Prisoner	Schnipps/The President	Episodes "The Girl Who Was Death" and "Fall Out"
1969	Strange Report	Segarus	Episode: "REPORT 4407 HEART 'No Choice for the Donor'"
1971	Paul Temple	Sergei Yalenkov	Episode: "Paper Chase"
1972	Spyder's Web	Ratznik	Episode: "Emergency Exit"
1972	Clochemerle	Ernest Tafardel	6 episodes
1972	Colditz	Dr. Starb	Episode: "Court Martial"
1974	Armchair Cinema	Julien Bour	Episode: "The Prison"
1975	Churchill's People	King John	Episode: "Silver Giant, Wooden Dwarf"
1979	Minder	Dai Llewellyn	Episode: "A Tethered Goat"
1984	The Zany Adventures of Robin Hood	Isaac of York	Television film
1986	Shaka Zulu	Zacharias Abrahams	Miniseries
1992	Lovejoy	Sir Desmond Clark	Episode: "Eric of Arabia"
2003	Holby City	Charlie Peters	Episode: "One of Our Own"

== Sources ==
- Barker, Dennis (2011) [2010]. "Griffith, Kenneth Reginald (1921–2006)". Oxford Dictionary of National Biography (online ed.). Oxford University Press. doi:10.1093/ref:odnb/97229. (Subscription, Wikipedia Library access or UK public library membership required.)
