= Torquil Riley-Smith =

British radio executive (born 1962)

Torquil Riley-Smith (full name Torquil Silvanus Matthew Septimus Riley-Smith, born 1962) is founder of the British radio station LBH, Britain's first gay radio station.

Riley-Smith started his first business in 1987, supplying Premium Rate telephone services to TV companies and Oracle Teletext. Riley-Smith in 1996 started "The Number for Life Company" as one of three Vodafone licensees selling and marketing 07000 prefix telephone numbers. This business was sold to "The Personal Number Company" in 1998. Torquil had a rather successful run at trading and owning race horses and has to date had 47 winners on the flat, including The Ayr Silver Cup 1995 and The Vodac Victress Stakes(Listed) in the same year; before founding LBH. Riley-Smith saw the lack of any radio station directed at the gay and lesbian market as a distinct business opportunity.

Riley-Smith was profiled on the BBC documentary series Trouble at the Top, in an episode titled "Queen of the Airwaves." For the last two years he has run his e-book company 'ABook2Read' where unsigned authors get a chance to have their work published.
