= The Painted Smile =

1962 British film by Lance Comfort

- Original British quad poster
- Directed by: Lance Comfort
- Written by: Pip and Jane Baker
- Based on: an original idea by Brock Williams
- Produced by: Tom Blakeley
- Starring: Liz Fraser; Kenneth Griffith
- Cinematography: Basil Emmott
- Edited by: John Trumper
- Music by: Martin Slavin
- Production companies: Blakeley's Films (M/C) Ltd. Colorama Features; Mancunian Film Corporation
- Distributed by: Planet Film Distributors (UK)
- Release date: May 1962 (UK)
- Running time: 56 minutes
- Country: United Kingdom
- Language: English

The Painted Smile (US title: Murder Can Be Deadly) is a 1962 British second feature thriller film directed by Lance Comfort and starring Liz Fraser, Kenneth Griffith, Peter Reynolds and Tony Wickert. It was written by Pip and Jane Baker.

== Plot ==
Tom, a student, comes under suspicion of murder when he discovers a dead body in the flat of con artist Jo. After he touches the murder weapon, Jo convinces him it is in his interest to dispose of the body. The victim was Jo's partner in crime who has been murdered by a Soho gang boss. However, the suspicions of the police are aroused and Tom becomes the obvious suspect.

== Cast ==
- Liz Fraser as Jo Lake
- Kenneth Griffith as Kleinie
- Peter Reynolds as Mark
- Tony Wickert as Tom
- Craig Douglas as nightclub singer
- Nanette Newman as Mary
- Ray Smith as Glynn
- David Hemmings as Roy
- Harold Berens as Mikhala
- Grazina Frame as Lucy
- Richard McNeff as police inspector
- Gerald Sim as plain clothes policeman
- Rosemary Chalmers as Gloria
- Mia Karam as Dawn
- Terence Maidment as henchman
- Bill Stevens as henchman
- Lionel Ngakane as barman
- Ann Wrigg as manageress

== Critical reception ==
The Monthly Film Bulletin wrote: "Though neatly put across, the workaday script is both pretentious and none too convincing. The main interest lies in the straight performance of Liz Fraser in an unsympathetic role, and in the efficient location work at St. Pancras Station."

Kine Weekly wrote: "The picture gets quickly off the mark and, following the showmanlike night club opening, devolves into a lively battle of brains and brawn between Kleinie and the boys. Liz Fraser proves that she can act, as well as wiggle, as the far from scrupulous Jo, Tony Wickert is more than adequate as sucker Tom, Kenneth Griffith cuts a sinister figure as Kleinie, and Peter Reynolds and singer Craig Douglas score as guest artists. The chase climax is both salutary and suspenseful, and the settings are suitably varied."

The Radio Times wrote: "this dreadfully dull British B-movie makes its brief running time seem like an eternity."

Chibnall and McFarlane in The British 'B' Film call the film an "above-average melodrama."

Cinedelica called the film "engaging and without a dull moment. Good stuff."
