= List of horror films of 1966 =

A list of horror films released in 1966.

Horror films released in 1966
Title	Director	Cast	Country	Notes
An Angel for Satan	Camillo Mastrocinque	Barbara Steele, Antonio De Teffé, Pier Anna Quaglia	Italy	
Billy the Kid vs. Dracula	William Beaudine	Chuck Courtney, John Carradine, Melinda Plowman	United States	
The Black Cat	Harold Hoffman	Robert Frost, Robyn Baker, Sadie French	United States	
Blood Bath	Stephanie Rothman, Jack Hill	Lori Saunders	United States; Yugoslavia	
The Blood Drinkers	Gerardo de León	Amalia Fuentes, Ronald Remy, Eddie Fernandez	United States; Philippines	
Carry on Screaming!	Gerald Thomas	Harry H. Corbett, Kenneth Williams, Fenella Fielding	United Kingdom; United States	Horror comedy
Chamber of Horrors	Hy Averback	Cesare Danova, Wilfrid Hyde-White, Patrick O'Neal	United States	
Curse of the Swamp Creature	Larry Buchanan	John Agar, Francine York, Shirley McLine	United States	
Daimajin	Kimiyoshi Yasuda	Miwa Takada, Yoshihiko Toyama, Jun Fujimaki	Japan	
Daimajin Strikes Again	Kimiyoshi Yasuda	Miwa Takada, Yoshihiko Toyama, Jun Fujimaki	Japan	
The Deadly Bees	Freddie Francis	Suzanna Leigh, Frank Finlay, Guy Doleman	United Kingdom	
Death Curse of Tartu	William Grefé	Fred Pinero, Babette Sherril, Mayra Christine	United States	
The Diabolical Dr. Z	Jesús Franco	Mabel Karr, Fernando Montes, Estella Blain	France; Spain	
Dracula: Prince of Darkness	Terence Fisher	Christopher Lee, Barbara Shelley, Andrew Keir	United Kingdom	
The Empire of Dracula	Federico Curiel	Eric del Castillo, Cesar del Campo, Lucha Villa	Mexico	
The Ghost and Mr. Chicken	Alan Rafkin	Don Knotts, Joan Staley, Liam Redmond, Dick Sargent	United States	Comedy-horror
The Hand of Night (aka Beast of Morocco)	Frederic Goode	William Sylvester, Diane Clare, Aliza Gur	United Kingdom	
Island of Terror	Terence Fisher	Peter Cushing, Edward Judd, Carole Gray, Eddie Byrne	United Kingdom	
Jesse James Meets Frankenstein's Daughter	William Beaudine	John Lupton, Narda Onyx, Estelita Rodriguez	United States	
Kill, Baby, Kill	Mario Bava	Erica Blanc, Giacomo Rossi-Stuart, Giana Vivaldi	Italy	
Manos: The Hands of Fate	Hal P. Warren	Hal P. Warren, Tom Neyman, John Reynolds	United States	
Munster, Go Home!	Elio Scardamaglia	Fred Gwynne, Yvonne De Carlo, Al Lewis	United States	Comedy-horror
The Murder Clinic	Lionello De Felice	William Berger, Françoise Prévost, Mary Young	Italy; France	
Naked Evil	Stanley Goulder	Anthony Ainley, Basil Dignam, Brylo Ford	United Kingdom	
The Navy vs. the Night Monsters	Michael A. Hoey	Mamie Van Doren, Anthony Eisley, Biff Elliot	United States	
The Painted Skin	Bao Fang	Gao Yuan, Zhu Hong, Chen Juanjuan	Hong Kong	
Picture Mommy Dead	Bert I. Gordon	Don Ameche, Martha Hyer, Zsa Zsa Gabor	United States	
The Plague of the Zombies	John Gilling	André Morell, Diane Clare, John Carson	United Kingdom	
Queen of Blood	Curtis Harrington	John Saxon, Basil Rathbone, Judi Meredith	United States	
Rasputin, the Mad Monk	Don Sharp	Christopher Lee, Barbara Shelley, Richard Pasco	United Kingdom	
The Reptile	John Gilling	Noel Willman, Jennifer Daniel, Ray Barrett	United Kingdom	
Return of Daimajin	Kimiyoshi Yasuda	Miwa Takada, Yoshihiko Toyama, Jun Fujimaki	Japan	
Seconds	John Frankenheimer	Rock Hudson, Salome Jens, Will Geer	United States	
The She Beast	Michael Reeves	John Karlsen, Ian Ogilvy, Barbara Steele	United Kingdom; Italy	
Sting of Death	William Grefé	Deanne Lund, Mantan Moreland, Sandy Lee Kane, Blanche Devereaux	United States	
Terror Beneath the Sea	Hajime Sato	Sonny Chiba, Peggy Neal, Franz Gruber	Japan	
The Undertaker and His Pals	David C. Graham	Ray Dennis, Warrene Ott, Rad Fulton	United States	
The Vulture	Lawrence Huntington	Robert Hutton, Akim Tamiroff, Broderick Crawford	United Kingdom; United States; Canada	
The Witches	Cyril Frankel	Joan Fontaine, Kay Walsh, Alec McCowen	United Kingdom	

== Citations ==
- Hardy, Phil, ed. (1995). The Overlook Film Encyclopedia. Vol. 3. Overlook Press. ISBN 0-87951-624-0.
- Krafsur, Richard P., ed. (1997). The American Film Institute Catalog of Motion Pictures Produced in the United States: Feature Films, 1961–1970, Part 2. University of California Press. ISBN 0-520-20970-2.
- Curti, Roberto (2015). Italian Gothic Horror Films, 1957–1969. McFarland. ISBN 978-1476619897.
- Halligan, Benjamin (2003). Michael Reeves. Manchester University Press. ISBN 0719063515.
