= Georgina Ward (actress) =

British actress (1941–2010)

The Honourable Georgina Ward
- Ward in Danger Man (1965)
- Born: Georgina Anne Ward; 13 March 1941; Chipping Sodbury, Gloucestershire, United Kingdom
- Died: June 2010 (aged 69); Mexico
- Occupation: Actress
- Years active: 1961–1973 (film & TV)
- Known for: Pride and Prejudice; The Man Who Finally Died; The Avengers; Danger Man
- Parent(s): George Ward, 1st Viscount Ward of Witley; Anne Capel

The Honourable Georgina Anne Ward (13 March 1941 – June 2010) was a British stage, film and television actress. She was the daughter of the British Cabinet Minister George Ward, 1st Viscount Ward of Witley and Anne Capel (1919–2008), whose father Boy Capel was a muse of fashion designer Coco Chanel.

== Antecedents ==
Ward's paternal grandfather William Ward, 2nd Earl of Dudley, whose second wife was the Edwardian music hall star Gertie Millar, was a member of Lord Salisbury’s government and later Governor-General of Australia. His mother, Georgina’s great-grandmother, was the noted Victorian beauty Georgina Moncreiffe, Countess of Dudley, whose sister Harriet’s flirtation with the Prince of Wales, later Edward VII, led to his becoming embroiled in a scandalous divorce case.

On her mother’s side, Ward was the great-granddaughter of the Liberal politician Thomas Lister, Lord Ribblesdale, whose sister-in-law Margot Tennant married H. H. Asquith, British Prime Minister at the outbreak of the First World War.

== Acting career ==
Ward studied at the Sorbonne in Paris. Her early acting career was nurtured by Vivien Leigh and she had a number of “walk on” parts with the Royal Shakespeare Company. In 1963 Ward appeared in the stage adaptation of Anthony Powell's first novel, Afternoon Men, which led to friendship with the author and eventually his dedication of his novel, The Military Philosophers, to Ward. Among her leading roles on stage was Strindberg’s Miss Julie in London in 1965. During the 1960s and early 1970s, she appeared in episodes (mostly extant) of a number of popular British TV series, often in nefarious roles, and also in films. Her first movie, in 1963, was the espionage thriller The Man Who Finally Died with Stanley Baker and Peter Cushing. At the height of “Swinging London,” Ward's appearance as Celia Toms, trendy wife of a veterinary surgeon, in Anglia TV's rural soap opera Weavers Green helped raise its national profile. The series ended in September 1966, with Celia and her vet husband returning to London in the final episode. As such she was the cover star of the TV Times on 16 July 1966 (during the finals of the FIFA World Cup in England).

== Political career forestalled ==
In the early 1970s Ward was a potential Labour candidate for the parliamentary constituency of Worcester, then held by Conservative Cabinet minister, Peter Walker (and, until 1960, by her father, also a Conservative, who was Secretary of State for Air in Harold Macmillan’s government). However she stood down after risqué photographs of her in the film Clinic Exclusive (also known as With These Hands) appeared in the press. Ward’s acting career also stalled around this time.

== Personal life ==
In 1958 Ward was one the last debutantes to be presented at Court to Queen Elizabeth II before the practice was discontinued. Another actress, Sue Lloyd, shared that distinction. As part of that year’s social season, Ward’s uncle, the Earl of Dudley, gave a dance for her at the Dorchester Hotel.

Ward’s first husband, the journalist Alastair Forbes (1918–2005), whom she married in 1966, was uncle of US Democratic Senator John Kerry. Their marriage was dissolved in 1971. Ward later lived in Mexico with her second husband, Patrick Tritton (born 1934), an old Etonian and graduate of Trinity College, Cambridge, whom she married in 1978 and was possibly the model for Dicky Umfraville in novelist Anthony Powell’s A Dance to the Music of Time. He died on 1 February 1998.

In July 1961 Ward was convicted at Birmingham Assizes of dangerous driving that caused the death of a man after the jury in an earlier hearing had been unable to reach a verdict. She denied that she had been rushing to get to the theatre at Stratford-upon-Avon for a rehearsal, and was fined £100 and disqualified from driving for four years after the judge, Mr Justice Fenton Atkinson, concluded that no “deliberate recklessness was involved”.

Ward was the cousin once removed of actress Rachel Ward. Her only sibling, the Hon Anthony Ward, pre-deceased their father in 1983 and so the Ward viscountcy became extinct on Lord Ward's death in 1988. Through marriages into the Dudley earldom, Ward was distantly related to, among others, Freda Dudley Ward, mistress of the future King Edward VIII; actresses Tracy Reed and Jane Birkin; and Queen Camilla, consort of Charles III. She was unrelated to actress Lalla Ward, also the daughter of a Viscount, despite occasional assumptions that they were.

== Selected filmography ==
=== Television ===
- Theatre 70, ‘Surrender Value’ (1961)
- Emergency Ward 10 (1963)
- Suspense, “The Tourelle Skull” (1963)
- The Plane Makers (1964)
- The Third Man (1964)
- Danger Man (2 episodes, 1965)
- The Avengers, "The Master Minds" (1965)
- Gideon's Way (1965)
- The Baron (1966)
- Weavers Green (1966) (as Celia Toms)
- Pride and Prejudice (1967) (as Caroline Bingley)
- The Wednesday Play, ‘Birthday’ (1969)
- The Main Chance (1970)
- Crown Court (1973)
- Life and Soul (Granada TV play) (1973)

In October 1967 Ward was a guest on the BBC2 panel game Call My Bluff.

=== Film ===
- The Man Who Finally Died (1963)
- Two Weeks in September (1967)
- Loving Feeling (1968)
- Clinic Exclusive (1971)

== Bibliography ==
- Peter Cowie & Derek Elley. World Filmography: 1967. Fairleigh Dickinson University Press, 1977.
