= A Night Out (play) =

Tom Bell in the Armchair Theatre production opening titles

A Night Out is a play written by Harold Pinter in 1959.

Albert Stokes, a loner in his late twenties lives with his emotionally suffocating mother and works in an office. After being falsely accused of groping a female at an office party, he wanders the streets until he meets a girl, who invites him to her flat, where he responds to her overtures by angrily demeaning her. Then he returns home to his mother.

The play had its first performance on the BBC Third Programme on 1 March 1960, with Pinter's acting-school classmate and friend Barry Foster as Albert Stokes, Harold Pinter as Seeley, and Vivien Merchant, Pinter's first wife, as the Girl.

Its performance on television a month later, on 24 April 1960, was Pinter's first big success as a playwright in that medium. As presented on ABC Weekend TV's Armchair Theatre, it was viewed by 6.4 million households, at that time a record for a single television drama.

== Plot ==
=== Act One ===
Albert Stokes, a young man aged 28, is getting ready for his company's party. His overbearing mother protests, and tries to persuade him to stay home. Despite her efforts, Albert heads out to meet his friends, Seeley and Kedge, who are waiting at a coffee stall.

While waiting for Albert, Seeley and Kedge discuss their company team's recent football game, where Albert performed worse than usual. The pair also express concern about Albert and his relationship with his mother before Albert arrives. He expresses anxiety about going to the work party, but Seeley and Kedge persuade him to go.

Before the curtain falls, we see Albert's mother in the kitchen heating up a shepherds pie, then placing an alarm clock on the table and starting a game of patience.

=== Act Two ===
The party is in full swing at Mr King's house. The party is a farewell event for Mr Ryan, an old man who is leaving the company. Gidney, the company's chief accountant, tires to persuade Joyce, a girl from the office, to dance with Albert "to see his reaction". Joyce refuses, but Gidney tells her to get Eileen, another girl from the company, to dance with him instead.

Joyce and Eileen head over to Albert and start to tease him but are interrupted by Mr King beginning a toast to Mr Ryan. During the toast, Eileen suddenly screams and says she was touched inappropriately by someone. She accuses Albert, who denies touching her. The audience is shown that it was in fact Mr Ryan who touched her.

Gidney starts to berate Albert, while Seeley comes to his defence. The three head into the hallway, where Gidney continues to voice his complaints about Albert and demands he apologise to Eileen. They continue to argue, until Gidney calls Albert a "mother's boy", upon hearing which Albert hits him. After a brief scuffle, Mr King breaks up the fight and Albert leaves.

Albert returns home at midnight and tries to sneak past his mother, who has fallen asleep, but she wakes up and sees him. She goes on an extended rant and accuses Albert of lying about the work party and instead going to a Soho bar. Albert remains silent for the duration, until he lunges for the clock on the table and raises it "violently" above his head. She lets out a stifled scream and the curtain falls.

=== Act Three ===
The curtain opens on Albert sweating and leaning against the coffee stall, which is now shuttered. He is approached by The Girl, who invites him into her home. In the room, the pair strike up a conversation, throughout which Albert responds coolly.

After The Girl scolds Albert for dropping ash on his carpet, Albert snaps and threatens to attack her using the clock on her mantelpiece. He rants about his various perceived slights throughout the evening and claims to have "finished" his mother as The Girl grows more frightened. He destroys a picture of The Girl's daughter, claiming it is actually a picture of The Girl herself that she lied about. He then orders her to put his shoes on him and leaves.

Albert arrives home and sits in the kitchen with a smile on his face, before being startled by his mother's voice. She enters the kitchen and, after tearfully reproaching him for threatening her, offers to forget about the night's events. The curtain falls as she tries to reassures herself that Albert is a "good boy".

== Production history ==
=== BBC Third Programme ===
Televised on 1 March 1960, produced by Donald McWhinnie.

==== Cast ====
- Barry Foster – Albert Stokes
- Mary O'Farrell – Mrs Stokes
- Harold Pinter – Seeley
- John Rye – Kedge
- Walter Hall – Barman at the Coffee Stall
- Norman Wynne – Old Man
- David Bird – Mr King
- Norman Wynne – Mr Ryan
- Nicholas Selby – Gidney
- Jane Jordan Rogers – Joyce
- Auriol Smith – Eileen
- Margaret Hotine – Betty
- Hugh Dickson – Horne
- David Spenser – Barrow
- Vivien Merchant – The Girl

=== ABC Armchair Theatre ===
Televised on 24 April 1960.

- Director Philip Saville
- Producer Sydney Newman
- Designer Assheton Gorton

==== Cast ====
- Tom Bell – Albert Stokes
- Madge Ryan – Mrs Stokes
- Harold Pinter – Seeley
- Philip Locke – Kedge
- Edmond Bennett – Barman at the Coffee Stall
- Gordon Phillott – Old Man
- Arthur Lowe – Mr King
- Edward Malin – Mr Ryan
- Stanley Meadows – Gidney
- José Read – Joyce
- Maria Lennard – Eileen
- Mary Duddy – Betty
- Stanley Segal – Horne
- Walter Hall – Barrow
- Vivien Merchant – The Girl

== Bibliography ==
- Pinter, Harold. 'A Night Out', in Pinter: Plays One. (London: Eyre Methuen, 1986). ISBN 0-413-34650-1
