= Nicholas Preston, 17th Viscount Gormanston =

Irish noble (born 1939)

(Jenico) Nicholas Dudley Preston, 17th Viscount Gormanston (born 19 November 1939), is an Anglo-Irish aristocrat and British hereditary peer, who sat on the Conservative & Unionist benches in the House of Lords (as Baron Gormanston) until 1999.

Lord Gormanston is styled the Premier Viscount of Ireland, his title being created by Edward IV in 1478.

== Family background ==
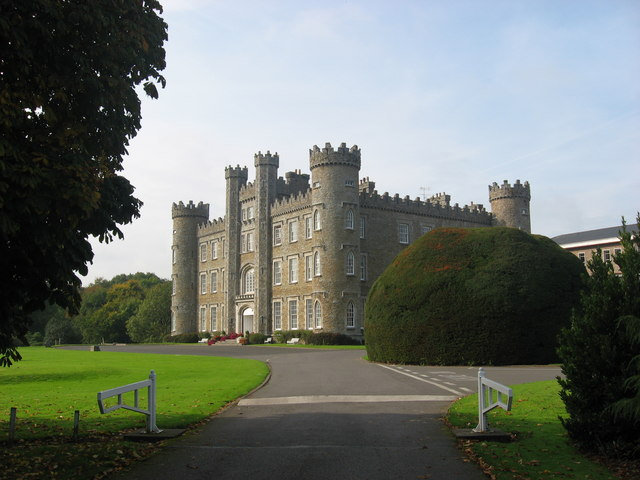
Gormanston Castle, County Meath

The only son and heir of the 16th Viscount Gormanston (1914–1940) and Pamela Hanly (1917–1975), only daughter and heiress of Captain Edward Hanly, of Avonmore House, County Wicklow and Lady Marjorie Feilding (daughter of the 9th Earl of Denbigh), he succeeded in the family titles before his first birthday.

His father, the 16th Viscount Captain Jenico Preston, King's Own Yorkshire Light Infantry (who married Pamela Hanly in 1939), served in WWII being killed in action at Dunkirk in 1940.

His grandfather, the 15th Viscount Gormanston JP DL, a prominent Irish landowner (of about 11,000 acres), served as a Lieutenant in the 15th (Prince of Wales' Own Civil Service Rifles) Bn, The London Regiment. His maternal great-grandfather was General Sir William Butler, of Bansha Castle, County Tipperary, and his great-grandmother was the celebrated Victorian painter, Elizabeth Thompson (later Lady Butler). The diplomat, the 14th Viscount Gormanston, was his paternal great-grandfather.

=== Gormanston Castle ===
The ancestral seat, Gormanston Castle in County Meath, Ireland, was sold to the Franciscan Order of Friars Minor (OFM) in 1947, becoming Gormanston College.

=== Later life ===
A Roman Catholic as with his recusant ancestors, he was educated at the Benedictine school of Downside, Somerset.

A socialite, Lord Gormanston became a connoisseur of art, being elected FRSA.

Lord Gormanston was one of the few former members of the House of Lords to be in place for both the accessions of Queen Elizabeth II and King Charles III. (Note: Prince Edward, Duke of Kent, John Pelham, 9th Earl of Chichester, David Davies, 3rd Baron Davies, Raymond O'Neill, 4th Baron O'Neill, Nicholas Lowther, 2nd Viscount Ullswater, Philip Chetwode, 2nd Baron Chetwode, Richard Chaloner, 3rd Baron Gisborough, and Shane Gough, 5th Viscount Gough, were also alive and held their respective titles in 1952 and 2022.)

== Personal life ==
In 1974, Viscount Gormanston married firstly, Eva-Antonie Landzianowska (1955–1984), daughter of Feliks Landzianowski (1907–2001), by whom he has two sons:

- The Hon. Jenico Francis Tara Preston, born 30 April 1974, heir apparent; commercial director British Fashion Council then Future Olympia, married 2015 Kelly Catherine Reade (born 1978), global communications director Jo Malone, descended via her mother from the marquises of Chaves, by whom he has one son,
  - (Jenico Bertram Nicholas) Alfred Preston, born 2016, heir-in-line;
- The Hon. William Luke Preston, born 1976, married 2016 Victoria Christensen.

He married secondly on 2 November 1997 Lucy Arabella Grenfell (née Fox; 1960), only daughter of Edward Fox and Tracy Reed.

Lord and Lady Gormanston live in Kensington, London.

== See also ==
- Baron Gormanston (I, cr. 1365)
- Baron Gormanston (UK, cr. 1868)

== Notes ==
Peerage of Ireland
Preceded by Jenico Preston	Viscount Gormanston; 1940–present	Incumbent; Heir apparent: Hon. Jenico Preston
Peerage of the United Kingdom
Preceded by Jenico Preston	Baron Gormanston; 1940–present Member of the House of Lords (1940–1999)	Incumbent; Heir apparent: Hon. Jenico Preston
