= Devils of Darkness =

1965 British horror film by Lance Comfort

- Theatrical release quad poster
- Directed by: Lance Comfort
- Written by: Lyn Fairhurst
- Produced by: Tom Blakeley
- Starring: William Sylvester; Hubert Noël; Carole Gray; Tracy Reed
- Cinematography: Frank Drake
- Edited by: John Trumper
- Music by: Bernie Fenton
- Production company: Planet Film Distributors
- Distributed by: Planet Film Distributors
- Release date: September 1965
- Running time: 88 minutes
- Country: United Kingdom
- Language: English

Devils of Darkness is a 1965 British horror film directed by Lance Comfort and starring William Sylvester, Hubert Noël and Carole Gray. It was written by Lyn Fairhurst. It was the last feature film directed by Comfort.

== Plot ==
Count Sinistre was put to death in the 16th century for his evil deeds, but rose from the dead. He later killed gypsy girl Tania, whom he then raised from the tomb and married. In 1964, he attacks again, at a small village where Paul Baxter and friends are on holiday. He murders three of Baxter's friends. Baxter, initially skeptical of the supernatural nature of the killings, becomes suspicious and stays in town with a talisman belonging to Sinistre taken from the scene of one of the murders. Sinistre pursues Baxter in an attempt to recover the talisman and murders Baxter's acquaintances along the way.

== Cast ==
- William Sylvester as Paul Baxter
- Hubert Noël as Count Sinistre
- Carole Gray as Tania
- Tracy Reed as Karen Steele
- Diana Decker as Madeleine Braun
- Rona Anderson as Anne Forest
- Peter Illing as Inspector Malin
- Gerard Heinz as Bouvier, hotel manager
- Brian Oulton as the Colonel
- Walter Brown as Bruno
- Eddie Byrne as Dr. Robert Kelsey
- Victor Brooks as Inspector Hardwick
- Marie Burke as old gypsy woman
- Marianne Stone as the duchess
- Avril Angers as Midge

== Reception ==
The Monthly Film Bulletin wrote: "Unconvincing excursion into the macabre, which is consistently disagreeable but never in the least alarming."

Boxoffice wrote: "Set in a twilight world of demons, this thriller in DeLuxe Color has an eerie mood to please the chill seekers as it depicts the adventures of visitors in a small town in Brittany who stumble, unwittingly, into the hands of devil worshippers. Since so much has been written in recent years on the subject, we can assume that producer Tom Blakely had technical authority for the impressive ceremonial rooms where black magic rites are performed. ... Running as the second half of a dual bill with Curse of the Fly, this is well produced of its kind."

In The Radio Times Guide to Films Alan Jones gave the film 1/5 stars, writing: "The first British vampire movie to use a contemporary setting finds undead Hubert Noel posing as an artist in Brittany ... Little sense of terror, or even atmosphere, is raised in this undistinguished, stilted dud."

In Sixties British Cinema Robert Murphy called the film "undeniably shoddy, its mixture of Celtic vampirism and smart-set witchcraft unconvincing. But the film's hero is played by the ever-reliable William Sylvester, and there is some satisfaction to be derived from the way in which the most boring characters are killed off by an avenging bat.

Critic Leonard Maltin awarded the film two out of four stars, calling it "intelligent, with great use of color, but flat, slow, and ultimately trivial."

Leslie Halliwell said: "Mainly tatty shocker with a few lively scenes."

== Home media ==
The film was released on DVD in 2007 by Odeon Entertainment.
