= Piers Bishop =

British artist, and former child star

- Born: 1956 (age 68–69); London

Piers Jourdain Bishop (born Hammersmith, London, 1956) is a British artist, and former child star. He is the eldest of three children. Within the 1970s, Bishop was a DJ on the north Norfolk circuit, and later in East London. He has been involved in starting up a number of businesses for arts and regeneration projects within the Lea Valley, and the North-West, including Artzone, and the Claverings company LTD. Currently, Piers is a practising artist, focussing mainly in painting and digital works, based on scientific themes. He lives in Morecambe, Lancashire, following leaving the Claverings company in 2002.

== Life and work ==
=== Early years ===
Throughout his childhood years, Piers was a product model for a number of different companies including Savlon, and Wall's ice cream. He was also a catalogue model, and was often the face of knitting patterns. Piers progressed from modelling to acting, and his first film was the 1962 thriller Tomorrow at Ten. This was followed up in 1964 by Ballad in Blue, starring alongside Ray Charles. After these, he was selected to star in Antony and Cleopatra, however for legal reasons he had to decline the role. Piers' acting career came to an end when his parents' business was relocated from London to Norfolk. After leaving school, Piers became a DJ in the local area. He then moved back to London, and continued his DJing, alongside his career in sales management and IT. This eventually became too time consuming, and so he gave up the DJing. He continued this career path until 1993.

=== Artistry ===
In 1994 Piers achieved his Art and Design A Level at Enfield College, and went on to study a Foundation in Art and Design, at St. Albans college of Art. He completed this in 1996. After taking a break from art to raise his daughter and focus on regeneration projects in the Lea Valley, Piers enrolled on a Fine Art degree at St. Martins college Lancaster, in 2004. He completed his bachelor's in 2007.

=== Current work ===
Since completion of his arts degree, Piers has worked on furthering his art career with both exhibitions, and teaching.

== Selected filmography ==
- Tomorrow at Ten (1962)
- Ballad in Blue (1964)
