= Raymond Poulton =

- Born: 22 May 1916; Middlesex, United Kingdom
- Died: 1992 (aged 75–76); Spain
- Occupation: Editor
- Years active: 1947–1980 (film)

Raymond Poulton (1916–1992) was a British film editor. During his career he worked on around forty productions, including two James Bond films Live and Let Die and The Man with the Golden Gun.

== Selected filmography ==
- While I Live (1947)
- Maytime in Mayfair (1949)
- Edward, My Son (1949)
- My Daughter Joy (1950)
- The Hour of 13 (1952)
- Betrayed (1954)
- Flame and the Flesh (1954)
- That Lady (1955)
- Storm Over the Nile (1955)
- Port Afrique (1956)
- Invitation to the Dance (1956)
- Seven Waves Away (1957)
- The Long Haul (1957)
- The Two-Headed Spy (1958)
- Gideon's Day (1958)
- The Mouse That Roared (1959)
- The Three Worlds of Gulliver (1960)
- Barabbas (1961)
- The Secret Partner (1961)
- The Captive City (1962)
- Just for Fun (1963)
- Ballad in Blue (1964)
- Berserk! (1967)
- Fright (1971)
- Live and Let Die (1973)
- The Man with the Golden Gun (1974)
- The Spiral Staircase (1975)
- Force 10 from Navarone (1978)

== Bibliography ==
- Blottner, Gene. Columbia Noir: A Complete Filmography, 1940-1962. McFarland, 2015.
