= Ballad in Blue =

1964 British film by Paul Henreid

- Directed by: Paul Henreid
- Written by: Paul Henreid; Burton Wohl
- Produced by: Herman Blaser
- Starring: Ray Charles; Tom Bell; Mary Peach; Dawn Addams; Piers Bishop
- Cinematography: Robert Huke
- Edited by: Raymond Poulton; John Trumper
- Music by: Bernie Fenton
- Production company: Alsa Productions
- Distributed by: 20th Century Fox
- Release dates: 18 February 1965 (London); 7 September 1966 (NYC)
- Running time: 89 minutes
- Country: United Kingdom
- Language: English

Ballad in Blue (also known as Blues for Lovers) is a 1965 British drama music film starring Ray Charles. The film was the last to be directed by Paul Henreid. It was written by Henreid and Burton Wohl.

== Plot ==
Ray Charles helps blind boy David in his struggle to regain his sight. However, David's overprotective mother Peggy is afraid of the risks connected with restoring David's sight. Ray tries to help the family, offering Peggy's heavy-drinking partner Steve an opportunity to work with Ray's band.

Fashion designer Gina tries to lure Steve. Margaret encourages David to sneak out and wander around London late at night on a mischievous adventure.

== Cast ==
- Ray Charles as himself
- Tom Bell as Steve Collins
- Mary Peach as Peggy Harrison
- Dawn Addams as Gina Graham
- Piers Bishop as David
- Betty McDowall as Mrs. Babbidge
- Lucy Appleby as Margaret
- Joe Adams as Fred
- Robert Lee Ross as Duke Wade
- Anne Padwick as bus driver
- Monika Henreid as Antonia
- Brendan Agnew as Antonia's protector
- Vernon Hayden as headmaster
- Leo McCabe as Dr. Leger
- The Raelettes as themselves

== Critical reception ==
The Monthly Film Bulletin wrote: "This flaccid tear-jerker scarcely fulfils the promise implicit in the rousing version of "Let the Good Times Roll" which accompanies the credits. In the face of the gimcrack script, Paul Henreid's anonymous direction can do little to disguise the banality of theme, characters and situations. Unconvincing settings and backgrounds ... uneasy handling of crowd scenes and extras, and some self-conscious small-part playing add to the air of disjointed aimlessness, and most of the lively moments come from Ray Charles and his band. ... Charles has an undeniable authority and panache and gives a striking demonstration of the art of revitalising clichés, only occasionally sinking into his most lachrymose vein."

Kine Weekly wrote: "Ray Charles ... surely deserves more intelligent treatment from his scriptwriter than he gets here. If the story had been merely a functional peg on which fo hang the star's musical expertise it would not have mattered, but the saccharine tale of little blind David is given considerable prominence, and the child aotor, Piers Bishop, has been coached to tearjerking extremes. ...There is, however, a pretty good ration of Ray Charles, his orchestra, the Raelets and some typical songs, of which "Unchain My Heart" is a real toetapper. Ray Charles may be no great shakes as an actor, but he certainly shows his talent in his own field."
