= Offbeat (film) =

1961 British film by Cliff Owen

- Directed by: Cliff Owen
- Written by: Peter Barnes
- Produced by: E.M. Smedley-Aston
- Starring: William Sylvester; Mai Zetterling; John Meillon; Anthony Dawson
- Cinematography: Geoffrey Faithfull
- Edited by: Antony Gibbs
- Music by: Ken Jones
- Production company: Northiam Productions
- Distributed by: British Lion Film Corporation (UK)
- Release date: 1961
- Running time: 71 mins
- Language: English

Offbeat (U.S. title: The Devil Inside) is a 1961 black-and-white British second feature ('B') crime film directed by Cliff Owen and starring William Sylvester, Mai Zetterling, John Meillon and Anthony Dawson. The screenplay was by Peter Barnes.

An MI5 officer goes undercover to catch a criminal gang, but the mission changes him.

== Plot ==
After a police sergeant investigating a crime gang is murdered, Scotland Yard are frustrated in tracking down the outfit responsible for large scale bank and jewellery robberies. They bring in Layton, a loner from MI5, to infiltrate the gang.

Layton poses as Steve Ross, a criminal who, unknown to the gang, has died and gone missing at sea. He finds the gang is organised like a business, with salaries, pensions, and a camaraderie he has not known before. He also becomes romantically involved with a gang member, Ruth Lombard. As the plot progresses, she starts to become suspicious of his identity but has feelings for him and doesn't voice her suspicions.

The gang drill and tunnel their way into an underground vault filled with jewels. They make their getaway and meet with the potential buyer of the jewels, who strikes a hard bargain. The buyer, who had known the real Steve Ross, spots that Layton is different man. Layton admits his impersonation. Scotland Yard arrive and arrest the whole gang. Layton feels he has betrayed his new friends, with whom he had found comradeship and love but who now reject him.

== Cast ==
- William Sylvester as Layton / Steve Ross
- Mai Zetterling as Ruth Lombard
- John Meillon as Johnny Hemick
- Anthony Dawson as James Dawson
- Neil McCarthy as Leo Farrell
- Harry Baird as Gill Hall
- John Phillips as Superindentent Gault
- Victor Brooks as Inspector Adams
- Diana King as Maggie Dawson
- Gerard Heinz as Jake
- Ronald Adam as J. B. Wykenham
- Neil Wilson as Pat Ryan
- Joseph Fürst as Paul Varna
- Nan Munro as Sarah Bennett
- Anthony Baird as constable

== Critical reception ==
The Monthly Film Bulletin wrote: "Even in the most upright thrillers sympathy quickens for the non-violent criminal. Here, the scales are tipped even further. The crooks are friendly souls whose loyalty to each other makes a new man of the lonely, mistrustful Layton (well played by William Sylvester). Though the morals of this tactic are doubtful, the sharp script takes pains to show the criminals as believable human beings: in this it is ably supported by the performances of John Meillon and Neil McCarthy. Mai Zetterling, too, manages to make Ruth far more convincing than the typical gangster's moll. The robbery is quite exciting in the copybook Rififi manner and, indeed, the whole production is very neatly tailored."

Kine Weekly wrote: "The plot is cast in the League of Gentlemen mould, but skilful characterisation and direction, to say nothing of realistic presentation, gives it a fresh and exciting slant. The film carries the kick of one twice its size ... The picture expresses sentiments that may raise some eyebrows, but though it subscribes to the proposition that there is some good in the blackest hat it hastily adds that crime doesn't pay. William Sylvester impresses as Steve, the copper who nearly turns robber; Mai Zetterling is truly feminine as the trustful Ruth; Victor Brooks scores as the vigilant Adams; and Anthony Dawson and John Meillon register as Dawson and Remick. There are a couple of torrid love scenes, while the burrowing into the jewellery store creates terrific tension."

Film historians Steve Chibnall and Brian McFarlane describe it as "a work of genuine ideological dissonance which questioned the conventional wisdom about crime and punishment".

Leslie Halliwell said: "Sharply observed thriller which gets a bit glum in dealing with its rather contrived 'switch'."

TV Guide gave the film 2.5 out of four stars, calling it a "good programmer";

Mystery File wrote, "after a slow beginning, I'd have to say that halfway into the film if not earlier, I was hooked to the screen, waiting for the answer. A minor film, to be sure, but recommended, definitely so."
