= Clinic Exclusive =

1971 British film by Don Chaffey

- Film poster
- Directed by: Don Chaffey
- Screenplay by: Hazel Adair; Kent Walton
- Produced by: Hazel Adair; Kent Walton
- Starring: Georgina Ward; Alexander Davion; Polly Adams; Mike Lewin; Carmen Silvera
- Cinematography: Brendan J. Stafford
- Edited by: John Trumper
- Music by: Ted Dicks
- Production company: Pyramid Films
- Distributed by: Planet Film Distributors
- Release date: 1971
- Running time: 93 minutes
- Country: United Kingdom
- Language: English

Clinic Exclusive (also known as Clinic Xclusive, With These Hands and Sex Clinic) is a 1971 British erotic film directed by Don Chaffey and starring Georgina Ward, Alexander Davion, Carmen Silvera and Windsor Davies.

== Plot ==
Julie Mason abuses her position as the owner of a private health clinic by selling sexual favours to her male clients, whom she then blackmails for large amounts of money. At the same time, she resists the sexual advances of Elsa Farson, a lonely, older woman.

When businessman Lee Maitland engages her services, Julie, who wants to make a new life for herself, is taken by her new client and quickly becomes his fiancée. Meanwhile, barred from visiting Julie, Farson commits suicide.

Julie is drawn into Maitland's plan to make them both rich, unaware that he is actually Farson's son and intends to avenge his mother. Eventually, Maitland fakes his death in a road accident that Julie helps to create, and then disappears with tens of thousands of pounds that Julie had extracted from her clients. Julie is left to choose between admitting blackmail or remaining silent and being charged with Maitland's murder.

== Cast ==
- Georgina Ward as Julie Mason
- Alexander Davion as Lee Maitland
- Polly Adams as Ann
- Mike Lewin as Roger Dawes
- Carmen Silvera as Elsa Farson
- Vincent Ball as Bernard Wilcox
- Basil Moss as Philip Eveleigh
- Tony Wright as police inspector
- Geoffrey Morris as Sir Roderick Clyde
- Maria Coyne as Marilyn
- April Olrich as Paula
- Windsor Davies as Geoffrey Carter
- Peter Halliday as Mr Fawcett

== Production ==
The film was written and produced by Hazel Adair and Kent Walton under the joint pseudonym Elton Hawke. Many of the cast had appeared in either Crossroads or Compact, soap operas co-created by Adair.

Clinic Exclusive marks the film debut of Carmen Silvera, later known for her role as Edith Artois in the BBC TV sitcom 'Allo 'Allo!.

== Release ==
Originally titled Clinic Xclusive, the film was re-released in May 1975 as Sex Clinic.

The publication in the press of stills from the film led to Ward withdrawing an application to be a UK parliamentary candidate for the Labour Party.

== Critical response ==
In the Monthly Film Bulletin (1972), critic Nigel Andrews wrote: "After the customary quota of coyly directed nude scenes in sauna bath and shower room – even less titillating than usual, since the clinic's clientele is predominantly middle-aged – Clinic Xclusive takes a turn for the better by developing into quite a neat, unpredictable revenge thriller. Script and direction are glossily efficient throughout, and Georgina Ward plays the ruthless go-getting heroine with some style. Altogether a surprisingly competent production, if only within the limits of its strictly catchpenny genre."

Graeme Clark of film review website The Spinning Image noted a lack of humour, commenting that the story is "played deadly seriously, to the extent that you'll be wishing for a little one-liner or item of saucy slapstick to break up the straight-faced monotony." He added that "[Ward's] pulchritude is the main reason to keep watching, because otherwise Clinic Exclusive [...] resembles a feature-length episode of vintage Crossroads written by Jackie Collins."
