= Betty McDowall =

Australian actress (1924–1993)

- Born: 14 August 1924; Sydney, New South Wales, Australia
- Died: 31 December 1993 (aged 69); London, England
- Occupation: Actress

Betty McDowall (14 August 1924 – 31 December 1993) was an Australian stage, film and television actress. She was born in Sydney, New South Wales in 1924.

McDowall began her career as an actress on stage and radio in Sydney. Her first film, made in Australia, was the 1948 war drama Always Another Dawn, in which she played the female romantic lead.

Her television appearances include episodes of Z-Cars, The Saint and The Prisoner. On stage, she appeared in the West End premiere of Tennessee Williams' play Period of Adjustment at Wyndham's Theatre in 1962.

On the radio, she played Laura Archer in BBC Radio 4's long running soap The Archers.

== Filmography ==
Year	Title	Role	Notes
1948	Always Another Dawn	Patricia	
1957	Interpol	Drug addict	Uncredited
1957	The Shiralee	Girl at Parkers	
1957	Time Lock	Lucille Walker	
1958	Diamond Safari	Louise Saunders	
1958	She Didn't Say No!	Mrs. Power	
1959	Jack the Ripper	Anne Ford	
1959	Dial 999 (TV series), ('Picture Puzzle', episode)	Jane	
1960	Jackpot	Kay Stock	
1960	Dead Lucky	Jenny Drew	
1961	Spare the Rod	Ann Collins	
1962	Tomorrow at Ten	Mrs. Parnell	
1963	Echo of Diana	Joan Scott	
1964	First Men in the Moon	Margaret Hoy	
1965	Ballad in Blue	Mrs. Babbidge	
1965	The Liquidator	Frances Anne	
1967	The Prisoner	Professor's Wife	Episode: "The General"
1976	The Omen	American Secretary	
