= Tomorrow at Ten =

1963 British film by Lance Comfort

- Theatrical release quad poster
- Directed by: Lance Comfort
- Written by: James Kelley; Peter Miller
- Produced by: Tom Blakeley
- Starring: John Gregson; Robert Shaw; Alec Clunes; Alan Wheatley
- Cinematography: Basil Emmott
- Edited by: Peter Pitt; John Trumper
- Music by: Bernie Fenton
- Release date: 23 June 1963
- Running time: 80 mins
- Country: United Kingdom
- Language: English

Tomorrow at Ten is a 1963 British second feature thriller film directed by Lance Comfort and starring John Gregson, Robert Shaw and Kenneth Cope. It was written by James Kelley and Peter Miller.

== Plot ==
A man calling himself Marlow kidnaps Jonathan Chester, the young son of wealthy industrialist Anthony Chester, and locks him in a rented house with a golliwog containing a time bomb. He then goes to see the boy's father and announces that he will only reveal his whereabouts once he has been paid £50,000 (a large sum at the time) and is safely in Brazil. The boy's nanny alerts the police and Inspector Parnell arrives to discourage Chester from paying up lest it encourages giving in to blackmailers' demands. Marlow then reveals that the time bomb will go off at 10 a.m. the next day, killing Jonathan. This is too much for Chester who attacks Marlow, causing the crook serious injuries from which he later dies, leaving the police with little time or indication as to where to find Jonathan.

== Cast ==
- John Gregson as Inspector Parnell
- Robert Shaw as Marlow
- Alec Clunes as Anthony Chester
- Alan Wheatley as Assistant Commissioner Bewley
- Kenneth Cope as Sergeant Grey
- Ernest Clark as Dr Towers
- Piers Bishop as Jonathan Chester
- Helen Cherry as Robbie
- William Hartnell as Freddie Maddox
- Betty McDowall as Mrs Parnell
- Harry Fowler as Smiley
- Renée Houston as Masie Maddox
- Alan Curtis as Inspector
- Noel Howlett as brain specialist
- Trevor Reid as Q Detective
- Ray Smith as Briggs
- Norman Coburn as desk man

== Critical reception ==
The Monthly Film Bulletin wrote: "By killing off the blackmailer relatively early on, this film robs itself of its principal asset, for Robert Shaw is chillingly effective in an intelligent performance which, for about twenty minutes – his methodical preparations for the crime, his scenes with the boy, his verbal duet with the Inspector – deludes one into thinking that Lance Comfort's direction is much better than it really is. Well before Robert Shaw's disappearance, however, the script begins to show signs of strain, in suggestions that Marlow will break because he has some awful mother-fixation; and with his unlikely demise, and the eleventh hour revelation, it finally snaps and becomes pure routine. Robbed of script and actors, the direction is unkindly revealed in all its laborious reliance on uninspired cross-cutting back and forth from rescuers to boy cuddling explosive golliwog."

Tomorrow at Ten was selected by the film historians Steve Chibnall and Brian McFarlane as one of the 15 most meritorious British B films made between World War II and 1970. While they praise the characterisation, the performances, the production design, the cinematography and the screenplay, they say that "the film's real strength is in the direction of the veteran Lance Comfort in one of his last films".
