= The Main Chance (film) =

1964 British film by John Knight

- Theatrical release poster
- Directed by: John Knight
- Screenplay by: Richard Harris
- Based on: a story by Edgar Wallace
- Produced by: Jack Greenwood
- Starring: Grégoire Aslan; Edward de Souza; Tracy Reed
- Cinematography: James Wilson
- Edited by: Derek Holding
- Music by: Bernard Ebbinghouse
- Production company: Merton Park Studios
- Distributed by: Anglo-Amalgamated
- Release date: 1964
- Running time: 59 minutes
- Country: United Kingdom
- Language: English

The Main Chance is a 1964 British second feature ('B') film directed by John Knight and starring Grégoire Aslan, Edward De Souza and Tracy Reed. Part of the series of Edgar Wallace Mysteries films made at Merton Park Studios, it was written by Richard Harris based on a story by Wallace.

== Plot ==
Criminal mastermind Potter needs a plane to smuggling jewels out of France, and sends his mistress Christine to recruit Michael Blake. Blake agrees, but plans to double-cross Potter, with the help of his accomplice Joe Hayes. Hayes ambushes Potter's car and steals the jewels, but finds pebbles have been substituted. Potter radios Blake who is in mid-flight, telling him his plane is rigged with explosives which he will detonate by wireless. But Christine has already disarmed the detonator and is in the plane with Blake and the diamonds.

== Cast ==
- Grégoire Aslan as Potter
- Edward de Souza as Michael Blake
- Tracy Reed as Christine
- Stanley Meadows as Joe Hayes
- Jack Smethurst as Ross
- Bernard Stone as Miller
- Will Stampe as Carter
- Julian Strange as butler
- Tony Bailey as chauffeur
- Joyce Barbour as Madame Rozanne

== Critical reception ==
The Monthly Film Bulletin wrote: "A neatly constructed tale of dishonour among thieves, with one comparative novelty in that nobody is killed or arrested. Grégoire Aslan's philosophic Potter and Edward De Souza's Blake – who comes over as a cross between John Bentley and the young George Sanders – between them project a coolly refreshing air of cynicism. Even so, and despite Potter's Goldfinger gadgets, it's not as good as it should have been: the direction is uninventive to an extent that borders on the obtrusive."
