= The Man Who Finally Died =

1963 British film by Quentin Lawrence

- US release film poster
- Directed by: Quentin Lawrence
- Written by: Lewis Griefer; Louis Marks
- Produced by: Norman Williams
- Starring: Stanley Baker; Peter Cushing
- Cinematography: Stephen Dade
- Edited by: John Jympson
- Music by: Phillip Green
- Production company: White Cross Management
- Distributed by: British Lion Films
- Release date: December 1963 (UK)
- Running time: 100 minutes
- Country: United Kingdom
- Language: English

The Man Who Finally Died is a 1963 British CinemaScope thriller film directed by Quentin Lawrence and starring Stanley Baker, Peter Cushing, Mai Zetterling and Eric Portman. It was based on the 1959 ITV series of the same name. The screenplay concerns a German immigrant living in Britain who receives a mysterious phone call telling him his father is not really dead. He returns to Bavaria to investigate the matter.

John Burke wrote a novelisation of the screenplay.

== Plot summary ==
Joe Newman, formerly Joachim Deutsch, returns to his small hometown in Bavaria, after living in the UK since the outbreak of World War II. He seeks information of what has become of his father, Kurtz. He finds out that his father is dead, but that he escaped from behind the Iron Curtain, went to live with a certain Dr von Brecht, and later married a woman named Lisa. Everyone Joe approaches to find answers, including Police Inspector Hofmeister and insurance agent Brenner, is reluctant to talk and give more details concerning the circumstances of his father. Joe begins to suspect that this is a cover-up and that they all want to keep certain facts regarding his father a secret. He breaks into von Brecht's home and finds an elderly man in the attic but is knocked unconscious before being able to establish his identity. When he regains consciousness, Joe sees the old man being driven away. It is now revealed by von Brecht and Lisa that his father didn’t manage to escape two years before, but swapped places with another escapee when mortally wounded. Meanwhile, Brenner, really a Russian agent, has kidnapped the old man and is taking him back to Russia by train. Joe then tracks them to a railway station and boards the train. Following a battle with Brenner, who falls from the moving train, Joe rescues the scientist from being abducted to the East and helps him escape from the country.

== Cast ==
- Stanley Baker as Joe Newman
- Peter Cushing as Doctor Peter von Brecht
- Mai Zetterling as Lisa von Deutsch
- Eric Portman as Inspector Hofmeister
- Nigel Green as Sergeant Hirsch
- Georgina Ward as Maria
- Niall MacGinnis as Brenner
- Barbara Everest as Martha
- Harold Scott as Professor
- Alfred Burke as Heinrich
- James Ottaway as Rahn
- Mela White as Helga
- Maya Sorell as Minna

== Critical reception ==
The Monthly Film Bulletin wrote: "This exceedingly complicated thriller scarcely warrants the trouble in working out its plot convolutions, and the dénouement, when it comes, owes too much to a dozen earlier spy mysteries. Under Quentin Lawrences very laboured direction, a number of talented players (and several untalented ones) heave and grimace to little effect, while the music underlines every plot switch just like the bad old days."

Leslie Halliwell said: "Busy adaptation of a TV serial with a convoluted plot which might have been more pacily developed and better explained."
