= Dead Lucky (film) =

1960 British film by Montgomery Tully

- Opening titles
- Directed by: Montgomery Tully
- Written by: Maurice Harrison; Sidney Nelson
- Produced by: Ralph Bond; Robert Dunbar
- Starring: Vincent Ball; Betty McDowall; John Le Mesurier; Alfred Burke; Michael Ripper
- Cinematography: Peter Hennessy
- Music by: William Davies
- Distributed by: British Lion Film Corporation
- Release date: June 1960
- Running time: 64 minutes
- Country: United Kingdom
- Language: English

Dead Lucky is a 1960 British second feature ('B') crime film directed by Montgomery Tully and starring Vincent Ball, Betty McDowall, John Le Mesurier, Alfred Burke and Michael Ripper. The film was written by Maurice Harrison and Sidney Nelson, and produced by Robert Dunbar for Act Films Ltd.

== Plot ==
A crime reporter teams up with a fashion journalist to investigate illegal goings-on at a Mayfair gambling club.

== Cast ==
- Vincent Ball as Mike Billing
- Betty McDowall as Jenny Drew
- John Le Mesurier as Inspector Corcoran
- Alfred Burke as Knocker Parsons
- Michael Ripper as Percy Simpson
- Sam Kydd as Harry Winston
- Chili Bouchier as Mrs Winston
- John Charlesworth as Honorable Stanley Dewsbury
- Frederick Piper as Harvey Walters
- Brian Worth as Lucky Lewis
- John Dearth as Torrance
- Joan Heal as barmaid
- John H. Watson as police sergeant
- André Mikhelson as croupier
- Robert Raglan as Assistant Commissioner
- Leon Peers as layer
- John Dawson as cashier
- Leonard Cracknell as copy boy

== Critical reception ==
The Monthly Film Bulletin wrote: "Bright and ingenuous, this rough and ready marriage of comedy and whodunit breezes along in such a way as to disguise much of its triteness of story and dialogue. Alfred Burke and John Le Mesurier make the best of the few acting opportunities going; otherwise eagerness prevails over lack of initiative and surprise."

Kine Weekly wrote: "The picture brings about a rather hasty marriage of 'who-dunnit' and comedy, but nevertheless produces occasional laughs and thrills. Vincent Ball and Betty McDowall are eager as Michael and Jenny; but Alfred Burke as Knocker and John Le Mesurier as Inspector Corcoran share the acting honours, such as they are. The staging is adequate, and one or two crisp lines creep into the dialogue."
