= Jack the Ripper (1959 film) =

- Theatrical poster
- Directed by: Monty Berman; Robert S. Baker
- Screenplay by: Jimmy Sangster
- Starring: Lee Patterson; Eddie Byrne; Betty McDowall; John Le Mesurier; Ewen Solon
- Cinematography: Robert S. Baker; Monty Berman
- Edited by: Peter Bezencenet
- Music by: Stanley Black (UK); Jimmy McHugh (US); Pete Rugolo (US)
- Production company: Mid-Century Film Productions
- Distributed by: Regal Film Distributors
- Release dates: 28 May 1959 (UK); 17 February 1960 (US)
- Running time: 82 minutes (U.K. edit); 85 minutes (U.S.edit)
- Country: United Kingdom
- Language: English
- Budget: £50,000
- Box office: $1.1 million (US)

Jack the Ripper is a 1959 film produced and directed by Monty Berman and Robert S. Baker. It is loosely based on Leonard Matters' theory that Jack the Ripper was an avenging doctor. The black-and-white film stars Lee Patterson and Eddie Byrne and co-stars Betty McDowall, John Le Mesurier, and Ewen Solon. It was released in England in 1959, and shown in the United States in 1960.

The plot is a "whodunnit" with false leads and a denouement in which the least likely character, in this case "Sir David Rogers" played by Ewen Solon, is revealed as the culprit. As in Matters' book, The Mystery of Jack the Ripper, Solon's character murders prostitutes to avenge the death of his son. While Matters had the son dying from venereal disease, the film has him committing suicide upon learning that his lover is a prostitute.

== Plot ==
In 1888, Jack the Ripper is on his killing spree. Scotland Yard Inspector O'Neill (Byrne) welcomes a visit from his old friend, New York City detective Sam Lowry (Patterson), who agrees to assist with the investigation. Sam becomes attracted to modern woman Anne Ford (McDowall) but her guardian, Dr. Tranter (Le Mesurier), doesn't approve. The police slowly close in on the killer as the public becomes more alarmed. The killer's identity is revealed and he meets a ghastly end.

== Cast ==
- Lee Patterson as Sam Lowry
- Eddie Byrne as Inspector O'Neill
- Betty McDowall as Anne Ford
- Ewen Solon as Sir David Rogers
- John Le Mesurier as Dr. Tranter
- George Rose as Clarke
- Philip Leaver as Music Hall Manager
- Barbara Burke as Kitty Knowles
- Anne Sharp as Helen
- Denis Shaw as Simes
- Jack Allen as Assistant Commissioner Hodges
- Jane Taylor as Hazel
- Dorinda Stevens as Margaret
- Hal Osmond as "Snakey", the pickpocket
- Patricia Phoenix as Rowdy Woman In Crowd
- Esma Cannon as Nelly, Drunk In Police Station (Uncredited)

== Production ==
The film's budget was raised from a combination of pre-sales to Regal Film Distributors at the National Film Finance Corporation. The film was prepared in different edits to accommodate various territories' tolerance of nudity and violence. The British version was subject to some BBFC trims, including a moment at the end where the movie switched from black and white to colour as blood materialized on the floor. A racier continental version was released in France.

== Release ==
Joseph E. Levine bought the US rights for £50,000. He later claimed he spent $1 million on promoting the movie and earned $2 million in profit on it. Levine replaced the Stanley Black score with a new one composed by Jimmy McHugh and Pete Rugolo, added some narration by Paul Frees to the opening moments, rearranged the credits to move most of the technical credits to the end while changing the font for the opening title sequence, and restored the colour blood insert at the end that had been removed on orders of the BBFC.

According to Variety, the film earned rentals of $1.1 million in North America on initial release.

=== Home media ===
After Paramount's U.S. rights expired, the film circulated mostly in public domain bootlegs until Severin Films released a licensed Blu-ray edition in America on Black Friday 2017. That limited pressing was a 2-disc edition with a Blu disc containing HD transfers of the British version (mastered at 1.33 ratio) and the American version (mastered at 1.66), and a DVD containing a SD reconstruction of the European "continental" edition using bits from the US and UK prints and tape sourced material for the alternate nude footage (with alternating aspect ratios accounting for the different source prints), along with an exclusive slipcover reproducing the jacket art of the source novel. A single disc release without the bonus DVD was mass market released shortly after that initial offering on January 8, 2018. In 2019, a collector provided a film element for the European cut, and after scanning it, Severin made a new HD hybrid cut using its nude scenes with the American print (mastered at a consistent 1.66 ratio), and released it on Blu-Ray at a discounted price beginning with its Black Friday sale that year, so previous buyers could effectively replace the previous DVD from the limited edition. The single disc Blu and the European Blu are still available at their website.

Regrettably, the film element used for the American version is a less-than-ideal 16mm copy, which had itself been borrowed from the Library of Congress. The aspect ratio of 1.66 to 1 is a center extraction of that print. The 35mm original camera negative has been lost, and has never been found.

However, in 2024, Severin discovered a 35mm fine grain positive of the European version and a 35mm duplicate negative of the U.S. version, from which they restored both along with additional material from a 35mm release print in order to make a 4K Blu-Ray set that released in May 2025.

== Critical reception ==
The New York Times called it a "shoddy horror feature" that was "extravagant only in its amount of gore." The Tampa Tribune said it was "an interesting motion picture with a cast of reasonably talented unknowns" and said that it contained "one of the most effective shock devices dreamed up by movie men in some time".

== Box Office ==
According to Kinematograph Weekly the film performed "better than average" at the British box office in 1959.

== Sources ==
- Meikle, Denis (2002). Jack the Ripper: The Murders and the Movies. Richmond, Surrey: Reynolds and Hearn Ltd. ISBN 978-1-903-11132-1.
- Woods, Paul; Baddely, Gavin (2009). Saucy Jack: The Elusive Ripper. Hershsam, Surrey: Ian Allan Publishing. ISBN 978-0-7110-3410-5.
