= Diamond Safari (1958 film) =

1958 film by Gerald Mayer

- Original film poster
- Directed by: Gerald Mayer
- Written by: Larry Marcus
- Produced by: Gerald Mayer
- Starring: Kevin McCarthy
- Music by: Woolf Phillips
- Production companies: Regal Films Inc; Schlesinger Film Organisation
- Distributed by: 20th Century Fox
- Release date: 1958
- Running time: 67 minutes
- Countries: USA; South Africa; UK
- Language: English

Diamond Safari is a 1958 American crime film directed by Gerald Mayer and starring Kevin McCarthy, Betty McDowall and André Morell.

Filmed in South Africa in 1955, the film features the first (and only) two 30-minute episodes of a television series called African Drumbeat.

== Plot ==
An American battles diamond smugglers in Africa.

== Cast ==
- Kevin McCarthy – Harry Jordan
- Robert Bice – Reubens
- Tommy Buson – Medicine Man
- John Clifford – Doc
- Joanna Douglas – Petey
- Frances Driver – Glass Blower's Wife
- Joel Herholdt – Sergeant van der Cliffe
- Hanna Landy – Wanda
- Betty McDowall – Louise Saunders
- Michael McNeile – Phillips
- Harry Mekela – Police Boy
- André Morell – Williamson
- Patrick Simpson – Carlton
- Geoffrey Tsobe – Stephen Timbu
- Gert Van den Bergh – Compound Manager

== Production ==
African Drumbeat is a TV series produced by Gerard Mayer for Edward Dukoff, personal manager of Danny Kaye. It was done in partnership with the Schlesinger Organization of South Africa and Great Britain.

Larry Marcus wrote three scripts for the series which focused on Harry Jordan, an American soldier of fortune in South Africa. Kevin McCarthy was cast in this role. Filming began in South Africa on 1 July 1955.

There was location filming in Krueger National Park. Filming was completed by October 1955.

No TV series resulted. The episodes were cut together and released as a feature film.
