= Alexander Davion =

French-born British actor (1929–2019)

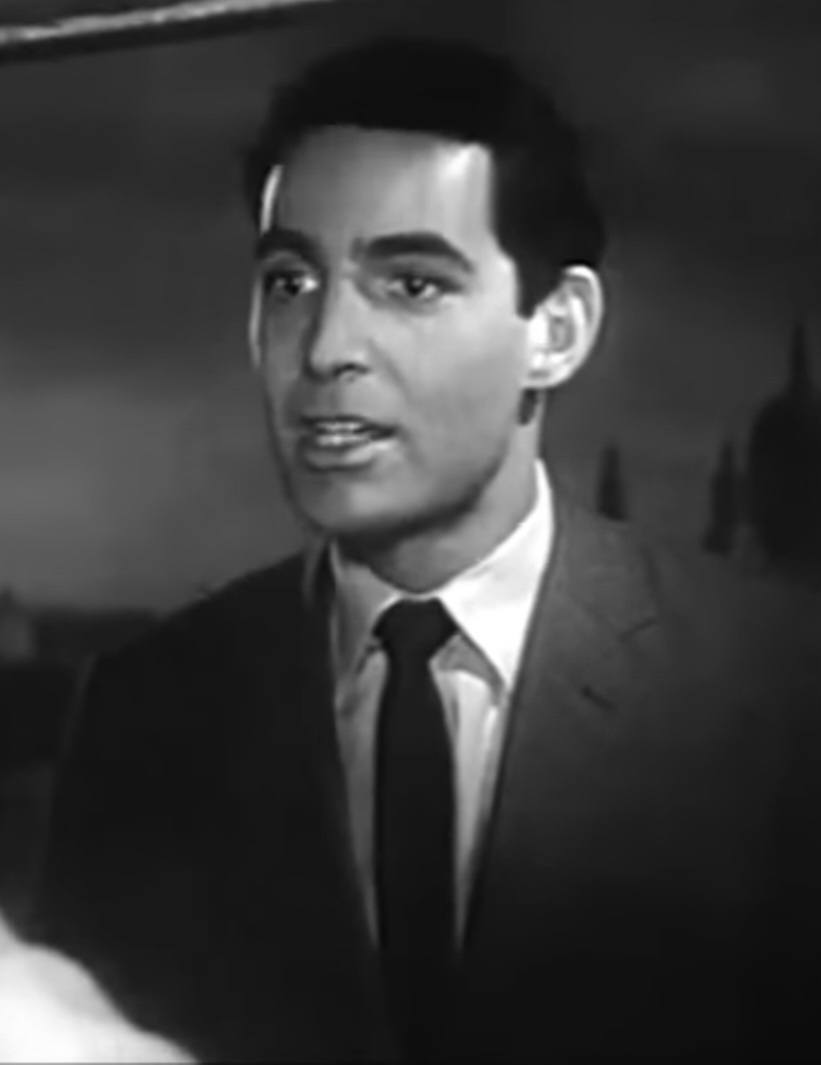
- Born: 31 March 1929; Paris, France
- Died: 28 September 2019 (aged 90); London, England
- Occupation: Actor

Alexander Davion (March 31, 1929 – September 28, 2019) was a French-born British actor. He was perhaps best known in the UK for his starring role in Gideon's Way as Detective Chief Inspector David Keen. He was born in Paris, France. He died in London, England at the age of 90.

== Personal life ==
He was married first to actress Ellen Caryl Klein (divorced) and to actress Anne Lawson in 1965.

== Filmography ==
=== Film roles ===
- 1951: Captain Horatio Hornblower - Spanish Officer (uncredited)
- 1954: The Good Die Young - Young Man (uncredited)
- 1955: Richard III - Messenger to Richard
- 1960: Song Without End - Chopin
- 1963: Paranoiac - Tony Ashby
- 1963: Blind Corner - Ricky
- 1964: Rattle of a Simple Man - Ricardo
- 1966: Plague of the Zombies - Harry Denver
- 1966: Thunderbirds Are GO - Space Captain Greg Martin (voice)
- 1967: Valley of the Dolls - Ted Casablanca
- 1969: The Royal Hunt of the Sun - De Nizza
- 1971: Incense for the Damned - Tony Seymour
- 1971: Clinic Exclusive - Lee Maitland
- 1982: Dark Echoes - Dereck Stanhope
- 1986: Whoops Apocalypse - Maguadoran General

=== Television roles ===
- 1959: Perry Mason (Episode: "The Case of the Wayward Wife") - Gilbert Ames
- 1960 Hong Kong (The unaired 30 minute pilot Blind Justice was expanded to an hour as Blind Bargain) - Chief Inspector Scott
- 1960: One Step Beyond (TV Series)(Episode:"To Know The End") - Captain Harry
- 1962: Combat! (Episode: "Any Second Now", season 1, episode 4)
- 1963: The Saint (Episode: "Starring the Saint", series 2, episode 2)
- 1964-1966: Gideon's Way (26 episodes) - David Keen
- 1966: The Man Who Never Was - Roger Barry
- 1967: Custer - Capt Marcus Reno
- 1970: UFO (Episode: The Psychobombs) - the executive
- 1977: Van der Valk (Episode: Diane) - as a man who is murdered at the start of the episode
- 1982: The Professionals (Episode: Operation Susie) - Torres
- 1984: Arch of Triumph (TV Movie) - Alex
