= Diane Clare =

British actress (1938–2013)

- Born: Diane Olga Claire Georgine Dirsztay; 8 July 1938; London, England
- Died: 21 June 2013 (aged 74)
- Education: Royal Academy of Dramatic Art
- Occupation: Actress
- Years active: 1958–1968
- Known for: The Haunting; Persuasion; The Reluctant Debutante
- Spouse: Barry England (1967–2009; his death)
- Children: 2

Diane Clare (born Diane Olga Claire Georgine Dirsztay; 8 July 1938 – 21 June 2013) was an English actress.

== Career ==
Clare started acting at a young age playing uncredited baby parts in films such as The Ghosts of Berkeley Square and The Silver Fleet, and for a time was one of the most highly paid babies in British films.

At the age of 3, Clare was too old to continue playing babies so her career came to a standstill. "I'd been longing to play in pictures from the time I was dropped all those years ago because I'd become too old to play baby parts", she told an interviewer in the late 1950s, after her comeback with roles in The Reluctant Debutante and Ice Cold in Alex. She received excellent reviews from playing in the latter film, and one journalist wrote: "I forecast that Miss Diane Clare is going to be one of the big names among actresses in the future."

She appeared in many horror films during the 1960s, most notably the Hammer Films production The Plague of the Zombies. In 1965, she had a small part as Julie (the girl at the food counter) in the "Death at Bargain Prices" episode of The Avengers.

== Personal life ==
Diane Dirsztay was born on 8 July 1938 in Wandsworth, London. She lied about her age so she could study at R.A.D.A. After her film comeback in 1958, Clare attributed it to a 'lucky' black beret which she always wore to auditions. "It brings me luck," she told one journalist after appearing in Ice Cold in Alex, "I wore it when I went to the audition for Anna Massey's part [in The Reluctant Debutante], and again when I went to Elstree Studios for my film test." Clare retired from acting when she married the novelist and playwright Barry England (born 1932 – died 2009) in 1967; the couple had two children, Kate (born 1969) and Christopher (born 1971). Her hobbies included dancing, riding, swimming and going to the cinema.

== Death ==
Diane Clare died on 21 June 2013, aged 74, from undisclosed causes.

== Filmography ==
Feature films
Year	Title	Role	Notes
1958	Indiscreet	Young Woman	minor role, uncredited
1958	Ice Cold in Alex	Sister Denise Norton	
1958	The Reluctant Debutante	Clarissa Claremont	
1960	Let's Get Married	Glad	
1961	The Green Helmet	Pamela	
1961	Out of the Shadow	Mary Johnson	
1961	The Naked Edge	Betty	
1961	Whistle Down the Wind	Miss Lodge - Sunday School Teacher {{{last}}}	
1961	Lunch Hour	Sheila	minor role, uncredited
1962	Mrs. Gibbons' Boys	–	minor role, uncredited
1962	Go to Blazes	'Girl lover'	
1962	The L-Shaped Room	Nurse	
1963
1963	Tamahine	–	minor role, uncredited
1963	The Haunting	Carrie Fredricks	
1964	Witchcraft	Amy Whitlock	
1966	The Plague of the Zombies	Sylvia Forbes	
1966	The Wrong Box	Mercy	
1966	The Trygon Factor	Clare O'Connor	
1967	The Vulture	Trudy Lutens	Starring role
1968	The Hand of Night	Chantal	final film role

=== Television ===
Year	Title	Role	Notes
1959	The Offshore Island	Mary Verney	Television film
1959	Charlie Drake		Episode: "The Return of Uncle Henry"
1959	ITV Television Playhouse	Rosemary Doris	Episode: "My Side of the Story"; Episode: "The White Sheep of the Family"; Episode: "The Lean Years"
1959	Saturday Playhouse	Faustina Crayle	Episode: "Through a Glass Darkly"
1959	Dixon of Dock Green	Ellie Martin	Episode: "A Piece of Pink Ribbon"
1960	Boyd Q.C.	Helen Mackenzie	Episode: "The Decoy Chick"
1960-1961	Persuasion	Henrietta Musgrove	3 episodes
1961	Theatre 70	Margaret	Episode: "News from Jerico
1961	BBC Sunday-Night Play	Susan Palmer; Patricia Clark	Episode: "A Kind of Strength"; Episode: "Scene of the Accident"
1961	Drama 61-67	Ann Horton	Episode: "Drama '61: The Best of Everything"
1961	Probation Officer	Jenny	1 episode
1962	Armchair Theatre	Jennie	Episode: "Joker"
1963	It Happened Like This	Diana	Episode: "Will You Walk Into My Parlour"
1963	Walter and Connie	Waitress	Episode: "Walter and Connie at the Seaside"
1963	Hancock	Fiona	Episode: "The Politician"
1963	The Human Jungle	Miss Henry	Episode: "The Vacant Chair"
1963	The Edgar Wallace Mystery Theatre	Selena Osmonde	Episode: "The Double"
1963	Moonstrike	Yvette de Polin	Episode: "Death Sentence"
1963	First Night	Prudence	Episode: "A Local Boy"
1964	Sergeant Cork	Kate Carstairs	Episode: "The Case of Ormsby Diamonds"
1964	Z Cars	Marion Maynard	Episode: "First Class Citizen"
1964	Love Story	Angela Thomas	Episode: "A Girl Like Me"
1964-1965	The Brothers Karamazov	Katya	Episode: "Madonna"; Episode: "Witness"; Episode: "Judgement"
1965	Public Eye	Julie	Episode: "A Harsh World for Zealots"
1965	The Avengers	Julie Thompson	Episode: "Death at Bargain Prices"
1965	No Hiding Place	Shirley	Episode: "Danger: Wrong Turning"
1966	Redcap	Sue	Episode: "Strictly by the Book"
1965-1966	Court Martial	Sergeant Wendy	Episode: "Retreat from Life"; Episode: "Let No Man Speak"; Episode: "The Logistics of Survival"; Episode: "Silence Is the Enemy"; Episode: "Taps for the Sergeant"; Episode: "Judge Them Gently"; Episode: "Achilles' Heel"
1966	Double Image	Anne	Episode: "Impossible Odds"
1957-1967	ITV Play of the Week	Diana Messerschmann; Phyllis Glenning; Miss Lawson; Celia	Episode: "Ring Round the Moon"; Episode: "Kind Lady"; Episode: "Girl with a Difference"; Episode: "ITV Summer Playhouse #11: The Man Who Understood Women"
1967	Summer Playhouse	Celia	Episode: "The Man Who Understood Women"
