= Weavers Green =

1966 British TV soap opera

Weavers Green is a British television soap opera, made in 1966 for ITV by Anglia Television. It was created based on an idea by Dick Joice. It was the first rural soap opera.

The series aired twice a week, revolving around two veterinary surgeons played by Grant Taylor and Megs Jenkins. It dealt with life in a small country town and provided an early TV role for Kate O'Mara as a student vet, a far cry from her later TV roles.

50 half hour episodes were produced. The first 30 were written by Peter Lambda and his wife Betty Paul who were succeeded by brothers Troy and Ian Kennedy Martin. Its budget was £500,000. The first national broadcast was on 7 April 1966 although was transmitted at different times in different regions.

The village of Heydon, north of Reepham, Norfolk was used for the main outside filming, and County School railway station was also used for some scenes. It was notable for being one of the first television programmes to be shot on location using videotape and outside broadcast equipment, rather than film, as had usually been the case for non-studio shooting until this point.

Additional cast: Eric Flynn, Georgina Ward, Richard Coleman, Susan Field, Vanessa Forsyth, John Glyn-Jones, Maurice Kaufmann, Marjie Lawrence, John Moulder Brown, Pat Nye, Wendy Richard, Gerald Young, Brian Cant, Edward Underdown, Susan George.

Unlike many ITV series of the 1960s, the series survives intact in the archives except for the untransmitted pilots.
