= A Stranger Came Home =

1954 British film by Terence Fisher

The Stranger Came Home
- A poster for the film bearing its American title: The Unholy Four
- Directed by: Terence Fisher
- Written by: Michael Carreras
- Based on: Stranger at Home by George Sanders
- Produced by: Michael Carreras
- Starring: Paulette Goddard; William Sylvester; Patrick Holt
- Cinematography: Walter J. Harvey; Len Harris
- Edited by: Bill Lenny
- Music by: Leonard Salzedo; John Hollingsworth
- Production company: Hammer Film Productions
- Distributed by: Exclusive Films (UK); Lippert Pictures (US)
- Release date: 9 August 1954 (UK)
- Running time: 80 minutes
- Country: United Kingdom
- Language: English
- Box office: 11,349 admissions (France)

The Stranger Came Home (U.S. title: The Unholy Four) is a 1954 British film noir directed by Terence Fisher and starring Paulette Goddard, William Sylvester and Patrick Holt. The screenplay was written by Michael Carreras based on the 1946 eponymous novel credited to actor George Sanders but actually ghostwritten by Leigh Brackett. The film was released in the United States by Lippert Pictures.

== Plot ==
Four friends go on a fishing trip but only three return. After an absence of four years, during which time he had been an amnesiac, the fourth man, Philip Vickers, returns home after regaining his memory. He tells of a "friend" who knocked him out, drugged him, and left him to die. Any one of the remaining men could be a suspect as Job Crandall, Bill Saul and Harry Bryce have all been interested in Philip's attractive 'widow', Angie. Unfortunately, Philip's return coincides with a murder and he becomes the main suspect. Angie joins forces with her husband to help solve the mystery and clear his name.

== Cast ==
- Paulette Goddard as Angie
- William Sylvester as Philip Vickers
- Patrick Holt as Job Crandall
- Paul Carpenter as Bill Saul
- Alvys Maben as Joan Merrill
- Russell Napier as Inspector Treherne
- Kay Callard as Jenny
- Patricia Owens as blonde
- David King-Wood as Sessions
- Jeremy Hawk as Police Sergeant Johnson

== Production ==
Filming began 4 January 1954. The film was produced by Hammer Films at Bray Studios in Berkshire with sets designed by the art director J. Elder Wills.

== Release ==
The film was trade shown in the UK on 14 July 1954, and released on 9 August.

== Critical reception ==
The Monthly Film Bulletin wrote: "This confused and unconvincing murder mystery is so spattered with red herrings as to be almost incomprehensible. Paulette Goddard works hard; but for the most part the acting is little superior to the material."

The New York Times wrote, "A THIRD-RATE British-made whodunit called The Unholy Four, featuring Paulette Goddard and a nondescript cast ... A few more fly-by-nights like this Lippert presentation, produced and written by Michael Carreras, and the still-shapely Miss Goddard may find herself collecting the pieces of a career."

Leonard Maltin called it "Muddled."

In British Sound Films: The Studio Years 1928–1959 David Quinlan rated the film as "average", writing: "Strength of character sees well-worn, fairly suspenseful thriller through."
