= Jackpot (1960 film) =

1960 British film by Montgomery Tully

- Directed by: Montgomery Tully
- Screenplay by: Montgomery Tully; Maurice J. Wilson
- Story by: John Sherman
- Produced by: Maurice J. Wilson
- Starring: William Hartnell; Betty McDowall; Eddie Byrne
- Cinematography: Walter J. Harvey
- Edited by: Jim Connock
- Music by: Don Banks
- Production company: Eternal Films
- Release date: 1960
- Running time: 71 minutes
- Country: United Kingdom
- Language: English

Jackpot is a 1960 British second feature crime film directed by Montgomery Tully and starring William Hartnell, Betty McDowall and Eddie Byrne. It was written by Tully and Maurice J. Wilson based on a story by John Sherman.

== Plot ==
Ex-convict Carl Stock went to jail for his part in a robbery, and he now wants his share of the loot. His accomplice Sam Hare, now the owner of the Jackpot Club, won't cooperate. Stock persuades ex-safecracker Lenny Lane to help him steal the money from Hare's office. They do the job, but Stock kills a policeman. Superintendent Frawley of Scotland Yard investigates. When the police trap Stock and Hare at Arsenal Stadium, the two criminals fight each other and fall to their deaths.

== Cast ==
- William Hartnell as Superintendent Frawley
- Betty McDowall as Kay Stock
- Eddie Byrne as Sam Hare
- George Mikell as Carl Stock
- Michael Ripper as Lenny Lane
- Victor Brooks as Sergeant Jacks
- Tim Turner as Peter
- Mike Sarne dancer in Lenny's snack bar
- Sylvia Davies as Sally (waitress in Lenny's cafe)
- Frank Forsyth as Desk Sergeant
- Charles Lamb as snack bar customer (uncredited)
- Stanley Meadows as police telephone wire tapper (uncredited)
- Ivan Craig as Dinty
- Frank Forsyth as Desk Sergeant (uncredited)
- Garard Green as Detective Briggs (uncredited)
- Brian Phelan as Taffy

== Critical reception ==
Kine Weekly said: "The picture, slick crime fare, brings to fiction the realism and excitement of fact. William Hartnell looks and lives his part as the hawk-eyed Frawley, Betty McDowall wins sympathy as the frightened Kay, Eddie Byrne convinces as the double-crossing Sam, and George Mikell can’t be faulted as the vicious Carl. Its supporting players, too, register. There is no dallying at the start, sentiment neatly punctuates violence, and the Arsenal Stadium climax is both salutary and showmanlike."

Monthly Film Bulletin wrote: "Though very routine in conception and treatment, this little crime thriller is at any rate slickly done. Taut from the word go, the climax at Arsenal Stadium during a floodlit football match is also more resourceful than the average B-picture finale. William Hartnell is largely wasted in a somewhat inconspicuous part; but most of the supporting players register, particularly Victor Brooks as a Detective Sergeant on the case."
