= Tom Bell (actor) =

British actor (1933–2006)

- Born: Thomas George Bell; 2 August 1933; Liverpool, Lancashire, England
- Died: 4 October 2006 (aged 73); Brighton, Sussex, England
- Occupation: Actor
- Years active: 1959–2006
- Notable credit(s): Albert Stokes in A Night Out; Toby in The L-Shaped Room; Adolf Eichmann in Holocaust; Bill Otley in Prime Suspect; Jack McVitie in The Krays
- Spouse: Lois Daine (m. 1960; div. 1976)
- Partner: Frances Tempest (1976–his death 2006)
- Children: 2

Thomas George Bell (2 August 1933 – 4 October 2006) was an English actor on stage, film and television. He often played menacing or seedy roles, perhaps most memorably playing sexist Detective Sergeant Bill Otley, antagonist to Helen Mirren's DCI Jane Tennison in Prime Suspect.

== Early life ==
Bell was born on 2 August 1933, in Liverpool, Lancashire. His family was large, and he had little contact with his father, a merchant seaman. Evacuated as a child during the Second World War, he lived with three different families in Morecambe, Lancashire. In 1948, at age 15, Bell first acted in school plays. His younger brother Keith also became an actor.

On leaving school he trained under Esme Church at the Bradford Civic Theatre; fellow pupils included Billie Whitelaw and Robert Stephens. He later worked in repertory in Liverpool and Dublin.

== Career ==
Michael Coveney described Bell as a "naturally gifted and unusually reserved leading actor", with a "quiet, mesmeric brand of acting". On television he had the role of Albert Stokes in Harold Pinter's first success in the medium, A Night Out (1960), while in the same year his first film appearance came in Joseph Losey's The Criminal. He continued to appear in the British New Wave films of the early 60s including The Kitchen (1961), and alongside Leslie Caron in The L-Shaped Room (1962). At an awards ceremony for the latter, he drunkenly interrupted a speech by Prince Philip, yelling "Tell us a funny story", to the obvious embarrassment of table companions Richard Attenborough and Bryan Forbes. While the Duke of Edinburgh apparently took the heckle in good humour, retorting "If you want a funny story, I suggest you engage a professional comic", the incident added to Bell's reputation as a hellraiser, and "did little to further [his] career". His other notable films of the decade included H.M.S. Defiant (1962), A Prize of Arms (1962), Ballad in Blue (1965), He Who Rides a Tiger (1965), and The Long Day's Dying (1968), followed by All the Right Noises in 1971.

In 1978, Bell received a BAFTA nomination for his portrayal of convicted armed robber Frank Ross in the crime-drama Out. Produced by Thames TV, this critically-acclaimed six-part 'mini-series' drew an audience of 10 million viewers per episode. That same year he portrayed Adolf Eichmann in the Emmy-winning tv-series Holocaust.

Declared bankrupt in 1982 for Inland Revenue debts of over £20,000, Bell bounced back with a later career renaissance, appearing in several British films including Wish You Were Here, Peter Greenaway's Prospero's Books, Swing and the 1990 film The Krays, where he played the part of Jack "The Hat" McVitie, one of the Kray twins' murder victims. In 1991, he played the dour owner of a run-down seaside waxworks museum in the Thames TV sitcom Hope It Rains, written by John Esmonde and Bob Larbey and directed by John Howard Davies. It ran for two series comprising thirteen episodes.

Although he tended to eschew live performance, Bell's few stage appearances included a role in the 1979 UK première of Bent, Martin Sherman's play about homosexuality, staged at the Royal Court Theatre. He played the character Horst, opposite Ian McKellen's Max. The play's examination of homosexual love, set in a Nazi death camp, was shocking for many theatregoers at the time and uncovered a previously little-examined area of Nazi brutality.

In the ITV series Prime Suspect, Bell played Detective Sergeant Bill Otley opposite Helen Mirren in the first (1991), third (1993) and final series (2006), the latter being one of his last on-screen appearances. His gripping portrayal of the toxic character secured Bell's second BAFTA nomination, in 1993.

== Personal life ==
Bell was married to the actress Lois Daine from 1960 to 1976. They had one son.

His partner from 1976 until his death was the costume designer Frances Tempest.

== Death ==
Bell had enjoyed working with TV director Danny Hiller, and agreed to appear in his first feature film Love Me Still at the suggestion of their mutual friend, showbiz accountant Jose Goumal. While clearly ill, Bell soldiered on and completed filming only a few days before the end of his life. He died in hospital in Brighton on 4 October 2006, aged 73, following a short illness. A few days later, "the poignantly timed broadcast of Prime Suspect – The Final Act" aired, "in which a visibly frail Otley died on screen".

== Filmography ==
=== Film ===
Year	Title	Role	Notes
1960	The Criminal	Flynn	
1961	Payroll	Blackie	
1961	The Kitchen	Paul	
1961	Echo of Barbara	Ben	
1962	H.M.S. Defiant	Evans	
1962	A Prize of Arms	Fenner	
1962	The L-Shaped Room	Toby Coleman Cohen	
1964	Sands of Beersheba	Dan	
1965	Ballad in Blue	Steve Collins	
1965	He Who Rides a Tiger	Peter Rayston	
1968	The Violent Enemy	Sean Rogan	
1968	The Long Day's Dying	Tom Cooper	
1968	In Enemy Country	Ian	
1969	Lock Up Your Daughters!	Shaftoe	
1971	Quest for Love	Colin Trafford	
1972	The Spy's Wife	Tom Tyler	Short
1972	Straight on Till Morning	Jimmy Lindsay	
1975	Royal Flash	De Gautet	
1978	The Sailor's Return	William Targett	
1983	Summer Lightning	Mr. Clark	
1985	The Innocent	Frank Dobson	
1987	Wish You Were Here	Eric	
1989	Resurrected	Mr. Deakin	
1989	Red King, White Knight	Tulayev	
1990	The Krays	Jack 'The Hat' McVitie	
1991	Prospero's Books	Antonio	
1991	Let Him Have It	Fairfax	
1995	Feast of July	Ben Wainwright	
1997	Preaching to the Perverted	Henry Harding MP	
1997	Swept from the Sea	Isaac Foster	
1997	The Boxer	Joe MaGuire's father	Uncredited
1999	Swing	Sid Luxford	
1999	Tube Tales	Old Gent	Segment: "Horny"
2001	The Last Minute	Grimshanks	
2001	Lava	Lava	
2001	My Kingdom	Quick	
2002	Long Time Dead	Becker	
2003	Devil's Gate	Jake	
2006	Dead Man's Cards	Billy the Cowboy	

=== Television (selected) ===
Year	Title	Role	Notes
1959	ITV Television Playhouse	Andrew Turtle	Episode: "Promenade"
1959–1972	Armchair Theatre	Various	4 episodes
1960	Armchair Mystery Theatre	Rod Copley	Episode: "Cul de sac"
1960–1963	BBC Sunday-Night Play	Various	3 episodes
1961–1962	Drama 61-67	Tom Knowles	2 episodes
1965	Theatre 625	Billy Mack	Episode: "No Trams to Lime Street"
1967	The Virginian	Cpl. Johnny Moon	Episode: "Johnny Moon"
1970–1984	Play for Today	Various	4 episodes
1971	The Ten Commandments	Mike Lee	Episode: "Be Lucky"
1972	Play of the Month	Eilert Lovborg	Episode: Hedda Gabler
1972	ITV Saturday Night Theatre	Vic Crawley	Episode: "The Samaritan"
1974	The Protectors	Shadbolt	Episode: "Shadbolt"
1974	Armchair Cinema	Ray Carter	Episode: "Sea Song"
1977	ITV Playhouse	Larry	Episode: "The Proofing Session"
1977	Horizon	Carl Jung	Episode: "The Healing Nightmare"
1978	Holocaust	Adolf Eichmann	3 episodes
1978	Out	Frank	Miniseries
1981	Sons and Lovers	Walter Morel	Miniseries
1983	Reilly, Ace of Spies	Felix Dzerzhinsky	6 episodes
1986–1989	Screen Two		2 episodes
1988	The Rainbow	Old Tom Brangwen	Miniseries
1990	Chancer	Mr. Love	3 episodes
1991, 1993, 2006	Prime Suspect	D.S. Bill Otley	Seasons 1, 3 and 7
1991–1992	Hope It Rains	Harry Nash	2 seasons
1993	The Young Indiana Jones Chronicles	Paul Emil von Lettow-Vorbeck	Episode: "Young Indiana Jones and the Phantom Train of Doom"
1993	Spender	Tommy Thornton	2 episodes
1996	Dangerfield	John Rust	Episode: "Eden"
1999	Dalziel and Pascoe	Oliver Fisher	Episode: "Recalled to Life"
2001	Taggart	Jack Hooper	Episode: "Falling in Love"
2001	Dr. Terrible's House of Horrible	Chief Inspector Ellis	Episode: "Voodoo Feet of Death"
2003	Waking the Dead	Cullen	2 episodes
2006	Ancient Rome: The Rise and Fall of an Empire	Publius Cornelius Scipio Nasica Serapio	Episode: "Revolution"
2006	Blue Murder	Vinny McAteer	Episode: "The Spartacus Thing"
