= He Who Rides a Tiger =

1965 British film by Charles Crichton

- Theatrical release poster
- Directed by: Charles Crichton
- Written by: Trevor Peacock
- Produced by: David Newman
- Starring: Tom Bell; Judi Dench; Paul Rogers
- Cinematography: John von Kotze
- Music by: Alexander Faris
- Distributed by: British Lion Films
- Release date: 1965
- Running time: 103 mins
- Country: United Kingdom
- Language: English
- Budget: £47,479

He Who Rides a Tiger is a 1965 British crime drama directed by Charles Crichton, and starring Tom Bell and Judi Dench. It was written by Trevor Peacock.

== Plot ==
On his release from prison Peter Rayston returns to his life as a house-breaker, which funds his affluent lifestyle. He meets and becomes involved with Joanne, but when she discovers the source of his wealth she breaks up with him. When his latest burglary job goes wrong, leading to the death of one of his accomplices, he goes on the run.

== Production ==
The film was based on the real-life cat-burglar Peter Scott. The title was derived from the Indian proverb, "He who rides a tiger can never jump off," and implies that the main character cannot escape from his way of life.

Crichton called making the film "a bad experience" because "the producer was a shit, a cheat and a bastard." He did not direct another theatrical film until A Fish Called Wanda (1988), his final film.

== Cast ==
- Tom Bell as Peter Rayston
- Judi Dench as Joanne
- Paul Rogers as Superintendent Taylor
- Kay Walsh as Mrs. Woodley
- Ray McAnally as orphanage superintendent
- Jeremy Spenser as The Panda
- Peter Madden as Peepers Woodley
- Inigo Jackson as Detective Sergeant Scott
- Annette Andre as Julie
- Edina Ronay as Anna
- Nicolette Pendrell as Ellen
- Ralph Michael as Carter
- Frederick Piper as Mr. Steed
- Rita Webb as flower seller
- Robin Hughes as Detective Sergeant Crowley
- Jimmy Gardner as waiter
- Howard Lang as prison governor
- Naomi Chance as Lady Cleveland
- Harry Baird as Stan (uncredited)
- Patricia Shakesby as policewoman (uncredited)

== Reception ==
The Monthly Film Bulletin wrote: "Although it is superficially a straightforward 'crime does not pay' yarn, He Who Rides a Tiger goes deeper into character than is usual in this sort of exercise. Essentially it is a study of a psychopathic personality, and Tom Bell's tense but likeable performance gives an only too believable reality to Peter's sudden violent rages, his equally unpredictable gentleness, and his palpably hopeless responsibility. He and Judi Dench, who brings warmth and integrity to Joanne, make their uneasy relationship very real, and in the orphanage scenes in particular, Charles Crichton has drawn a delightful response from the professional players and from the children. He is much less successful with the police side of the operation, and Paul Rogers seems wooden in the feebly written part of the Superintendent. Indeed, the film's weakness lies mainly in the script which, in spite of a good central idea, suffers from some silly plot mechanics and bad dialogue. Still, the genuine concern of the director and his leading players with the human problems of the story results in a liveliness and charm which are rare in this type of British thriller."
