= Blind Corner =

1963 British film by Lance Comfort

- Theatrical release poster
- Directed by: Lance Comfort
- Written by: James Kelley; Peter Miller
- Produced by: Tom Blakeley
- Starring: William Sylvester; Barbara Shelley; Elizabeth Shepherd; Alexander Davion; Mark Eden; Ronnie Carroll
- Cinematography: Basil Emmott
- Edited by: John Trumper
- Production companies: Mancunian Films; Blakeley's Films (Manchester) Ltd.
- Distributed by: Planet Film Distributors
- Release date: 2 July 1964
- Running time: 80 minutes
- Country: United Kingdom
- Language: English

Blind Corner (U.S. title: Man in the Dark) is a 1964 British second feature thriller film directed by Lance Comfort and starring William Sylvester, Barbara Shelley and Alexander Davion. The screenplay was by James Kelley and Peter Miller. It was produced by Tom Blakely for Mancunian Films / Blakeley's Films (Manchester) Ltd.

The scheming adulterous wife of a blind composer finally gets her comeuppance.

== Plot ==
Paul Gregory is a blind but successful pop music composer, married to the beautiful Anne. Anne is having a secret affair with struggling artist Rickie Seldon, and persuades Paul to commission Rickie to paint her portrait as a pretext to enable them to spend time together. Paul agrees, but after a recording session with Ronnie Carroll he is told by his business partner Mike Williams that Anne and Rickie have been seen about town together in circumstances which leave no doubt that they are more than friends. Paul knows that Mike has always disliked Anne and suspects he may be trouble-causing, but is finally persuaded of the validity of his allegations.

Paul makes it clear to Anne that he has found out about the affair and threatens to leave her. Fearing her meal-ticket is about to disappear, she tells Rickie that they will have to arrange an "accident" for Paul by getting him drunk and pushing him off the balcony of their home. If Rickie does not agree, she threatens, their affair must end. The plan is attempted, but is botched by Rickie, whose heart is not in it. After a struggle, he and Paul start to talk and Paul tells him to open his eyes to Anne's true nature, suggesting that she has been double-crossing him too. He tells Rickie that the real romance is between Anne and Mike, who have managed to hide it for so long by the public pretence of mutual antagonism and loathing. Rickie, having no personal antipathy towards Paul, forms an unlikely alliance with him. They entrap Anne into revealing her true motives: the whole scheme had been concocted with Rickie as a convenient fall guy, there to take the rap if suspicions were aroused about Paul's death. The police arrest Anne, Mike and Rickie. At the end of the film we see Paul and Joan Marshall leaving for a holiday together.

== Cast ==
- William Sylvester as Paul Gregory
- Barbara Shelley as Anne Gregory
- Alexander Davion as Rickie Seldon
- Elizabeth Shepherd as Joan Marshall
- Mark Eden as Mike Williams
- Ronnie Carroll as Ronnie
- Barry Alldis as compere
- Edward Evans as chauffeur
- Frank Forsyth as policeman

== Production ==
The film was publicised with the tagline: "She loved one man for kicks ... one man for luxury ... one man for murder".

== Critical reception ==
The Monthly Film Bulletin wrote: "An unassuming thriller in which credibility is let down by the unconvincing characterisation of Rickie, and the somewhat storybook picture of Paul's professional life and blissful lack of awareness of his efficient secretary's obvious adoration. The plot is conventionally contrived, most of the characters being hardly more than puppets, but the convulsions of the later sequences and the final twist largely compensate for weaknesses elsewhere."

Variety wrote: "Despite its tried-and-true formula and telegraphed plot, film manages to be fairly entertaining, mainly because its deftly directed. ...William Sylvester is quite competent as the blind composer while Barbara Shelley proves adequate as his faithless wife. Elizabeth Shepherd thefts many scenes as the composer's efficient if beautiful secretary, who secretly is in love with him. Alex Davion suffices as the portrait painter, being well cast as the he-man lover of the composer's wife. Mark Eden, as the composer's friend and agent, does splendidly in a contrasting role. Direction by Lance Comfort goes far in making a routine story quite palatable."

The Time Out Film Guide describes it as "an unassuming but occasionally effective second-feature thriller."

In Sixties British Cinema, Robert Murphy wrote: "Blind Corner ... looks like a reversion to the worst type of 50s (or 30s) jealous husband drawing-room thriller. But it is fascinating as a perfectly preserved fossil of a long dead form, and Sylvester's character – a blind composer continually distracted from his serious music by the need to write pop songs in order to pay for his wife's extravagant lifestyle – is firmly anchored in the 60s. The transfer of his affections from Barbara Shelley, his selfish, malevolent wife, to Elizabeth Shepherd, his stoically loving secretary, charts a satisfying path from indulgence and obsession to creativity and respect."
