= The Ten Commandments (1971 TV series) =

1971 British television series

- Genre: Drama anthology
- Written by: Ray Jenkins, Kevin Laffan, Leo Laffan, Bill MacIlwraith, Alun Owen, Jeremy Paul, Allan Prior,
- Directed by: John Frankau, Marc Miller, James Ormerod, Christopher Hodson, Joan Kemp-Welch, Colin Welland, Hugh Whitemore, Charles Wood
- Starring: Anthony Hopkins; Peter Sallis; Tom Bell; Graham Crowden; Mary Peach; Judy Parfitt; Janet Key; David Langton; Stephen Murray; Mary Ure
- Country of origin: United Kingdom
- No. of series: 1
- No. of episodes: 10

Production
- Executive producer: Peter Willes (10 episodes)
- Producer: Peter Willes (1 episode)
- Production location: Yorkshire
- Running time: 60 minutes
- Production company: Yorkshire Television

Original release
- Network: Yorkshire Television
- Release: 30 March – 1 June 1971

The Ten Commandments is a 1971 British ten-part series produced by Yorkshire Television and broadcast from 30 March 1971 to 1 June 1971.

== Plot ==
The Ten Commandments in England are all being interpreted in a modern 1970 scenario by ten different writers. All ten of the Commandments Steve, Gerry, Mike Lee, Prof. David Cuthbertson, Hilda, Vivien, Catherine Williams, Rupert, James Clark, Magdalene each get a contemporary take on each other from the writers.

== Cast ==
- Anthony Hopkins as Steve
- Peter Sallis as Gerry
- Tom Bell as Mike Lee
- Graham Crowden as Prof. David Cuthbertson
- Mary Peach as Hilda
- Judy Parfitt as Vivien
- Janet Key as Catherine Williams
- David Langton as Rupert
- Stephen Murray as James Clark
- Mary Ure as Magdalene

== Episodes ==
The series aired on television on Tuesday's from the 30 March 1971 to 1 June 1971 on the Yorkshire Television. All ten episodes are all fully intact and are all available to watch on TV Brain. All ten episodes are also all available to watch at the British Film Institute as well. The series has never been released on VHS, DVD or any other physical media platforms.

No.	Title	Original release date
1	"Decision to Burn"	30 March 1971
Hilary finds Steve to be attractive, although she soon relies the circumstances and the fact that men are not always what they seem.
2	"The Nineteenth Hole"	6 April 1971
Willy who is a successful doctor also has a good companion and is a first-class golfer, but when his friend Gerry suggests nominating him to get a membership for his golf club it becomes straightforward for two of his other friends and as a result there lives start changing.
3	"Be Lucky"	13 April 1971
Mike Lee has a frightening dream and tells his wife about it. Later that night his brother Col calls him and asks him to look after a locker key, but Col s actually a thief and so is Mike and they both live in a villains life in secret.
4	"Black Eye on Sunday"	20 April 1971
David dreams being a liberal, but when he gets assaulted by one of his class students, he then gets forced to quit many things he does for his life to get money.
5	"Hilda"	27 April 1971
Hilda who is in a secure safe marriage does not like the French, but when Louis Briquet walks into her life she starts to change.
6	"Husband and Friend"	4 May 1971
A young women named Sarah who lives with her husband Richard gets invited out to dinner with Richard's Boss and she wonders if it's attraction or if it's a promotion for her husband Richard. The truth turns out to be very sinister.
7	"The Catherine Wheel"	11 May 1971
A woman named Catherine becomes pregnant and her pregnancy forces an examination with her and her husband Bill.
8	"An Object of Affection"	18 May 1971
A middle aged man named Robert Sangster falls in love with his wife who is the same age as him but he views her as a much younger woman.
9	"As Many as Are Here Present"	25 May 1971
When Jack Clark realises that his son Ray Clark can publicly dismiss the Church as pagan, he decides to go along with it, but there's a boundary to be conflicted.
10	"A Bit of Family Feeling"	1 June 1971
Magdalene who is a successful British playwright start to write a new play when her parents decide to come and stay with her for the time being.

== Production ==
Peter Willes who was a head at ITV Yorkshire asked all ten of the writers working on the series to choose a commandment and interpret it in their own way possible. The series was also notable for being one of Jenny Agutter's first big roles on television.

== Critic reviews ==
One Critic described the series and all ten episodes as the art of plays illustrating in each episode.
