= Theatre 70 =

- Genre: Drama
- Written by: Jacques Gillies
- Directed by: Quentin Lawrence
- Starring: Zoe Caldwell, Richard Warner, Rosemary Gillies
- Country of origin: United Kingdom
- Original language: English
- No. of episodes: 25

Production
- Producer: Quentin Lawrence

Original release
- Network: ITV Associated Television
- Release: 1960 – 1961

Theatre 70 is a 70-minute UK dramatic television anthology series produced and broadcast by ITVnetwork Associated Television, produced and directed by Quentin Lawrence and written by Jacques Gillies. Twenty-five episodes aired on ITV from 1960–61.

Guest actors included Zoe Caldwell, Robert Horton, André Morell, Georgina Ward and Margaret Whiting.

== Cast ==
- Andre Morell - Colonel Gore-Hepburn
- Richard Warner - Mr. Fordyce
- Rosemary Gillies - Miss. Pringle
- Max Faulkner - Mr. Harvill
- Michael Logan - Mr. Sandersen
- Richard Vernon - Mr. Pearson
- Edward Jewesbury - Police Inspector
