= Aliza Gur =

Israeli actress (born 1940)

- עליזה גור
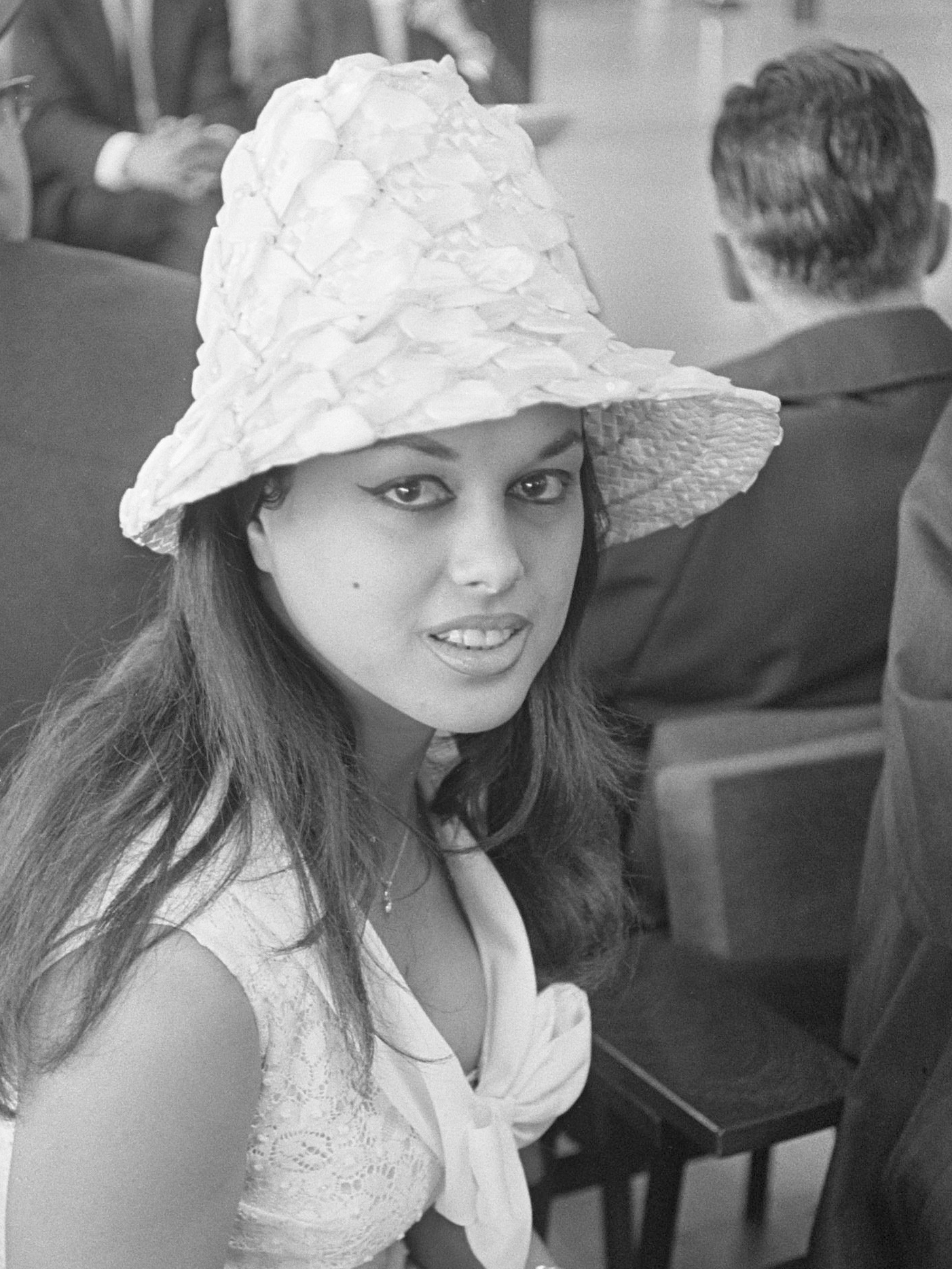
- Gur in 1964
- Born: Alizia Gross; 1 April 1940 (age 86); Ramat Gan, British Mandate of Palestine (now Israel)
- Other names: Aliza Gross; Alizia Gur; Alizia Gross
- Education: University of Haifa
- Occupations: Actress; beauty pageant winner
- Years active: 1960–1973
- Known for: From Russia with Love; Night Train to Paris; Tarzan and the Jungle Boy
- Title: Miss Israel 1960
- Spouses: Sabby Sagall (m. 1961; div. 1963) Seymour "Sy" Schulman (m. 1964; div. 1977) Sheldon Schrager (m. 1978; div. 1996)

Aliza Gur (Hebrew: עליזה גור, born Alizia Gross; 1 April 1940) is an Israeli actress and beauty pageant titleholder who was crowned Miss Israel 1960 and a semifinalist at the Miss Universe 1960 held in Miami Beach. She played Vida in the James Bond film From Russia with Love in 1963.

== Early life ==
Born Alizia Gross on 1 April 1940 in Ramat Gan, British Mandate of Palestine (now Israel), to a family of Ashkenazi Jewish descent. Her parents had fled Nazi Germany during Hitler's dictatorship and settled in the city of Ramat Gan where she and her brother were born. She studied at the University of Haifa, where she designed and made dresses to help pay for her tuition. Her first pageant win was as Miss Haifa.

She enlisted as a soldier in the Israel Defense Forces. Gur also studied acting in Tel Aviv under Peter Fry, a well known director. After her success in national and international beauty pageants, she settled in California, where she began her film and television career. Her parents emigrated to the United States, as well, and settled in Cleveland, Ohio, for a time; they died in the 1970s. In 1960, she toured America to help support the purchase of Israeli Bonds.

== Acting career ==
In 1965, she made a guest appearance on Perry Mason as Dr. Nina Rivelli in "The Case of the Baffling Bug". Her other television credits include The Big Valley, Daniel Boone, Get Smart, The Wild Wild West and Adventures in Paradise. Her film credits include Exodus (1960), A Place to Go (1962), From Russia with Love (1963), Night Train to Paris (1964), Agent for H.A.R.M. (1966), Kill a Dragon (1967), The Hand of Night (1968), and her last movie Tarzan and the Jungle Boy (1968).

Her most famous role was as Vida, one of two fighting gypsies in 1963's James Bond film From Russia with Love, where she fought Miss Jamaica's Martine Beswick. The female lead in the film, Daniela Bianchi, had been Gur's roommate at the 1960 Miss Universe pageant.

== Personal life ==
Gur married three times, first in 1961 to Sabby Sagall, then in 1964 to Sy Shulman, the director of Cedars of Lebanon Hospital, and finally in 1978 to Sheldon Schrager, film producer and vice-president of Columbia Pictures, in charge of production. She had one son from her second marriage. All three marriages ended in divorce.

== Filmography ==
=== Film ===
Year	Title	Role	Notes
1956	The Ten Commandments	Walk on role	Uncredited
1960	Exodus	Extra	Uncredited
1963	From Russia with Love	Vida	
1964	The Beauty Jungle	Miss Peru	
1964	Night Train to Paris	Catherine Carrel	
1966	Agent for H.A.R.M.	Mid-Eastern Contact	
1967	Kill a Dragon	Tisa	
1968	Tarzan and the Jungle Boy	Myrna	
1968	The Hand of Night	Marissa	

=== Television ===
Year	Title	Role	Notes
1960	Adventures in Paradise	Tiare	Episode: "The Intruders"
1963	Ghost Squad	Maria	Episode: "Sabotage"
1963	Taxi!	Tina Dobson	Episode: "Benefit of the Doubt"
1965	The Wackiest Ship in the Army	Terii	Episode: "Goldbrickers"
1965	The Big Valley	Naomi	Episode: "Earthquake"
1965	Burke's Law	Carmen	Episode: "Deadlier Than the Male"
1965	Perry Mason	Dr. Nina Revelli	Episode: "The Case of the Baffling Bug"
1965	O.K. Crackerby!	Carla Compagna	Episode: "Bitter Ravioli"
1965	Daniel Boone	Tawna	Episode: "The Christmas Story"
1967	The Man from U.N.C.L.E.	Francina	Episode: "The 'J' for Judas Affair"
1969	Get Smart	Gina	Episode: "Absorb the Greek"
1969	The Wild Wild West	Maria	Episode: "The Night of the Cossacks"
1972	Search Control	Deva Siri	Episode: "Moonrock"
1973	Cannon	Airplane Passenger	Episode: "Press Pass to the Slammer"
1973	Portrait: A Man Whose Name Was John	Rachel Friedman	TV film
