= Eddie Byrne =

Irish actor (1911–1981)

- Publicity photo autographed 1958
- Born: 31 January 1911; Dublin, Ireland
- Died: 21 August 1981 (aged 70); Dublin, Ireland
- Occupation: Actor
- Years active: 1946–1977

Eddie Byrne (31 January 1911 – 21 August 1981) was an Irish actor.

== Career ==
Byrne's stage work included many appearances with Dublin's Abbey Theatre, and also work with the National Theatre in London.

Byrne portrayed General Willard in Star Wars (1977) (named after George Lucas's friend and frequent collaborator Willard Huyck), but he is also remembered in horror roles such as the sceptical Inspector Mulrooney in The Mummy (1959) and as the kindly Dr. Reginald Landers in Island of Terror (1966), the rural inn owner in The Break (1963) and as Inspector O'Neill in Jack the Ripper (1959). On television, Byrne appeared in The Saint, Department S and in The Adventures of Robin Hood (1957), Season 3, Episode 5 as the lord of the manor.

== Personal life ==
Eddie Byrne was born in Dublin. He was married to Kitty Thuillier and had four children: Frank Byrne, Susan Byrne, Michael Byrne & Catherine Byrne. He died of a stroke in Dublin in 1981.

== Filmography ==
=== Film ===
Year	Title	Role	Notes
1946	I See a Dark Stranger	Irish Sailor Lookout	Uncredited
1947	Hungry Hill	Hennessy	
1947	Odd Man Out	Sailor and policeman	
1947	Captain Boycott	Sean Kerin	
1949	Saints and Sinners	Morreys	
1951	Lady Godiva Rides Again	Eddie Mooney	Released as Bikini Baby in USA
1952	Time Gentlemen, Please!	Dan Dance	The principal character of the film
1952	The Gentle Gunman	Flynn	
1953	The Square Ring	Lou Lewis	
1953	Albert R.N.	Joe	Released as Break to Freedom in USA
1954	Trouble in the Glen	Dinny Sullivan	
1954	Happy Ever After	Lannigan	
1954	Twist of Fate	Luigi	
1954	The Divided Heart	Second Justice	
1954	Aunt Clara	Fosdick	
1954	The Sea Shall Not Have Them	Petty officer porter	
1955	Three Cases of Murder	Snyder	("The Picture" segment)
1955	Children Galore	Zacky Jones	
1955	A Kid for Two Farthings	Sylvester the Photographer	Uncredited
1955	Stolen Assignment	Inspector Corcoran	
1955	One Way Out	Supt. Harcourt	
1956	Reach for the Sky	Flight Sergeant Mills	
1956	Zarak	Kasim	
1956	It's Great to Be Young	Morris	
1956	The Extra Day	Robin	
1957	The Man in the Sky	Ashmore	
1957	Seven Waves Away	Michael Faroni	Released as Abandon Ship in USA
1957	Face in the Night	Art	Released as Menace in the Night in USA
1957	The Admirable Crichton	Captain	Released as Paradise Lagoon in USA
1957	These Dangerous Years	Danny	Released as Dangerous Youth in USA
1958	Rooney	Mickey Hart	
1958	Dunkirk	Commander	
1958	Wonderful Things!	Harry	
1958	Floods of Fear	Sheriff	
1959	Jack the Ripper	Inspector O'Neill	
1959	The Mummy	Inspector Mulrooney	
1959	The Scapegoat	Barman	
1959	The Bridal Path	Mike Flanagan	
1960	Jackpot	Sam Hare	
1960	The Shakedown	George—Barman	
1960	The Bulldog Breed	PO Filkins	
1961	The Mark	Akers	
1961	Johnny Nobody	Landlord O'Connor	
1962	Locker Sixty-Nine	Simon York	Edgar Wallace Mysteries episode released as a featurette
1962	The Pot Carriers	Chief Officer Bailey	
1962	Mutiny on the Bounty	John Fryer	
1963	The Punch and Judy Man	Ice Cream Assistant	
1963	The Running Man	Sam Crewdson	
1963	The Cracksman	Domino	
1963	The Break	Judd Tredgar	
1965	Devils of Darkness	Dr. Kelsey	
1966	Island of Terror	Dr. Reginald Landers	
1967	The Vengeance of Fu Manchu	Ship's Captain	Uncredited
1969	Sinful Davey	Yorkshire Bill	
1969	Where's Jack?	Rev. Wagstaff	
1969	Guns in the Heather	Bailey	
1970	Wedding Night	Tom	
1971	Journey to Murder	Policeman	(The Killing Bottle)
1972	All Coppers Are...	Malloy	
1973	Never Mind the Quality, Feel the Width	Father Ignatious	
1973	The MacKintosh Man	Fisherman	
1977	A Portrait of the Artist as a Young Man	Teacher	
1977	Star Wars	General Willard	Final live action feature film appearance
1993	The Thief and the Cobbler	Hoof	Voice, (final film role)
