= Tracy Reed (English actress) =

English actress (1942–2012)

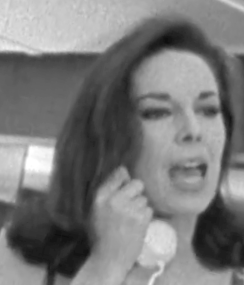
- Reed as Miss Scott in a screenshot of the trailer of Dr. Strangelove (1964)
- Born: Clare Tracy Compton Pelissier; 21 September 1942; Barnet, Middlesex, England
- Died: 2 May 2012 (aged 69); County Cork, Ireland
- Occupation: Actress
- Years active: 1960–1976
- Spouses: Edward Fox (m. 1958; div. 1961) Neil Hallett (m. 1970; div. 1973) Bill Simpson (m. 1974; div. 1982) Christopher McCabe (m. 1982; div. 1983)
- Children: 3
- Parent(s): Anthony Pelissier; Penelope Dudley-Ward
- Relatives: Carol Reed (stepfather); William Dudley Ward (grandfather); Freda Dudley Ward (grandmother)

Tracy Reed (born Clare Tracy Compton Pelissier; 21 September 1942 – 2 May 2012) was an English actress.

== Early life and education ==
Reed was the daughter of director Anthony Pelissier and actress Penelope Dudley-Ward; she took the surname of her stepfather, Carol Reed, following her mother's remarriage in 1948. Reed was the granddaughter of actress Fay Compton and producer H. G. Pelissier, and of socialite Freda Dudley Ward and politician William Dudley Ward, a great-grandson of William Humble Ward, 10th Baron Ward. Her great-uncle was novelist Sir Compton Mackenzie. Actor Oliver Reed was a step-cousin.

She attended Miss Ironside's School in Kensington.

== Career ==
During a film-acting career that lasted from the early 1960s until 1975, she appeared in about 30 films, the TV series Man of the World (1962), and was at one point under consideration as a replacement for Diana Rigg in The Avengers. In one episode of Dr. Finlay's Casebook in 1967, Reed played opposite Bill Simpson, whom she later married.

Reed is best remembered today for her role as Miss Scott, the secretary and mistress of General 'Buck' Turgidson (George C. Scott) in director Stanley Kubrick's film Dr. Strangelove (1964). She has the only female role in that film, and is (principally) seen in only one scene—when she answers the phone while Turgidson is in the bathroom. She is also shown as the centrefold "Miss Foreign Affairs" in the June 1962 copy of Playboy magazine being read by pilot Major T. J. "King" Kong (Slim Pickens) in the B-52. In the photo, she is lying down, apparently nude, with the January 1963 issue of Foreign Affairs—Vol. 41, No. 2, containing Henry Kissinger's suggestive article "Strains on the Alliance"—strategically draped across her buttocks. When asked in 1994 if she had "fond memories" of working on the film, she replied "'Oh yes, lots!'", but "'I was wearing a bikini the whole time,' Reed [remembered], and when Kubrick decided to open the set to the press, 'there were all these reporters staring at me. It was dreadful.'" She again appeared in a feature film starring Peter Sellers, this time in the Blake Edwards comedy A Shot in the Dark (also 1964). Alongside Beau Bridges, Reed also played the madame in Adam's Woman (1970), filmed in Australia.

Later in life, she worked as a gourmet foods company representative in Ireland, travelling the country to persuade shops to sell her employer's products.

== Marriages ==
Reed was four times married:

1. Actor Edward Fox (1958–1961; divorced). Their daughter, the former Lucy Fox, now the wife of the 17th Viscount Gormanston, recalled after her mother's death: "she remained close to my father. The marriage was doomed from the start, but they never stopped being close friends. They really loved each other so much."
2. Actor Neil Hallett (1970–1973; divorced); no children
3. Actor Bill Simpson (1974–1982; divorced); two daughters
4. Christopher McCabe (1982–1983; divorced); no children

== Death ==
Reed died of liver cancer in County Cork, Ireland, on 2 May 2012, aged 69; her funeral was held there.

== Selected filmography ==
- The Way Ahead (1944) (as a baby) as the Perry's Daughter (uncredited)
- Our Man in the Caribbean (1962–1963, TV series) as Maggie Warren / Maggie / Maggie MacFarlane
- Esther Waters (1964, TV series) as Miss Peggy
- The Main Chance (1964) as Christine
- Dr. Strangelove (1964) as Miss Scott
- A Shot in the Dark (1964) as Dominique Ballon
- Devils of Darkness (1965) as Karen
- You Must Be Joking! (1965) as Poppy Pennington
- Maroc 7 (1967) as Vivienne
- Casino Royale (1967) as Fang Leader
- Hammerhead (1968) as Miss Hull
- Journey to Midnight (1968) as Joyce (episode: "The Indian Spirit Guide")
- Adam's Woman (1970) as Duchess
- Percy (1971) as Mrs. Penney
- Melody (1971) as Woman in hospital
- Fun and Games (1971) as Linda
- UFO (1971) as Jane Carson (episode: "The Dalotek Affair")
- The Deadly Females (1976) as Joan
- Phantom Halo (2014) as Casino Patron (uncredited) (final film role)
