= Edward Judd =

British actor (1932–2009)

- Born: 4 October 1932; Shanghai, China
- Died: 24 February 2009 (aged 76); Mitcham, London, England
- Years active: 1948–1992
- Spouses: Gene Anderson (m. 1957; died 1965) Norma Ronald (m. 1966; died 1993)
- Children: 3

Edward Judd (4 October 1932 – 24 February 2009) was a British actor.

== Biography ==
Born in Shanghai in 1932, Judd and his English father and Russian mother fled when the Japanese attacked China five years later. His career was at its peak in the 1960s, with a series of leading roles in British science fiction films, including The Day the Earth Caught Fire (1961 – a disaster film in which he played an alcoholic reporter during a time when two large nuclear explosions altered the Earth's axis, propelling the Earth towards the Sun), First Men in the Moon (1964), and Island of Terror (1966). As well as starring in these films, he worked as a soap opera actor and performed other character parts on television. His roles in these science fiction films were highly praised by audiences and critics alike. Judd was also known for the 1975 "Think Once, Think Twice, Think Bike" campaign to make motorists aware of the risks faced on the road by motorcyclists.

Judd's success in The Day the Earth Caught Fire saw Columbia Pictures sign him to a long-term contract. However, according to Val Guest, "he was such a pain in the ass to everybody. He had an enormous opinion of himself and he was his own worst enemy. Columbia just loaned him out here and there and then let him go."

Judd appeared regularly on TV. In particular, he played the tyrannical uncle, William Russell, in the 1979 TV mini-series Flambards. He also appeared in Thriller (1975), The Sweeney, Crown Court (TV series), and The Onedin Line in supporting roles. Very little is known of his life after the 1970s. He was heard in an episode of the BBC Radio comedy Drop Me Here, Darling, starring Leslie Phillips, in 1983, as well as playing Barrymore in a televised version of The Hound of the Baskervilles the same year, and the BBC Radio play Philadelphia Moonshine in 1985. He appeared in the 1988 TV film Jack the Ripper as Thomas Arnold.

In the early 1970s, Judd lived in Cottenham Park Road, Wimbledon. During the 1970s and 1980s, Judd (known as Eddie to some friends, as evidenced in Michael Caine's 2011 autobiography) was a highly respected voice-over artist, used on many commercials recorded in the recording studios in London's Soho.

In the early 1990s, Judd lived in the Phoenix Hotel in Wimbledon and was a credit officer for a Canadian investment bank. He lived at a retirement home in Mitcham in his last years.

== Personal life ==
Judd was married twice; his first wife, who had also appeared in The Day the Earth Caught Fire, was actress Gene Anderson, who died suddenly aged 34 from a cerebral haemorrhage whilst filming Z Cars: The Share Out in May 1965. They had one daughter.

His second wife was actress Norma Ronald, with whom he had two daughters.

== Selected filmography ==
- The Guinea Pig (1948, uncredited)
- The Small Voice (1948)
- Once a Jolly Swagman (1949, uncredited)
- The Large Rope (1953, uncredited)
- Adventure in the Hopfields (1954), - Bill (uncredited)
- The Good Die Young (1954, - Simpson, Young Boxer (uncredited)
- X the Unknown (1956) - 2nd Soldier (uncredited)
- The Long Haul (1957) - Trucker
- Carry On Sergeant (1958) - Fifth Storesman
- The Man Upstairs (1958) - P.C. Stevens
- I Was Monty's Double (1958) - Another Soldier
- Subway in the Sky (1959) - Molloy
- No Safety Ahead (1959, uncredited)
- The Shakedown (1960) - Bernie (Barber)
- Sink the Bismarck! (1960) - Navigating Officer on 'Prince of Wales' (uncredited)
- The Challenge (1960) - Detective Sergeant Gittens
- The Criminal (1960) - Young warder
- The Day the Earth Caught Fire (1961) - Peter Stenning
- Mystery Submarine (1963) - Lt. Cmdr. Tarlton
- Stolen Hours (1963) - Mike Bannerman
- The World Ten Times Over (1963) - Bob Shelbourne
- The Long Ships (1964) - Sven
- First Men in the Moon (1964) - Arnold Bedford
- Strange Bedfellows (1965) - Harry Jones
- Invasion (1966) - Dr. Mike Vernon
- Island of Terror (1966) - Dr. David West
- The Vengeance of She (1968) - Philip
- Living Free (1972) - Game Warden Weaver
- Universal Soldier (1972) - Rawlings
- Because of the Cats (1973) - Mierle
- The Vault of Horror (1973) - Alex (segment 4 "Bargain in Death")
- O Lucky Man! (1973) - Oswald
- Assassin (1973) - MI5 Control
- Feelings (1976) - Dr. Benson
- Spanish Fly (1976) - Perkins (voice)
- The Incredible Sarah (1976) - Jarrett
- The Boys in Blue (1982) - John Hilling
- Night Train To Murder (1983) - Knife Thrower
- The Hound of the Baskervilles (1983) - Barrymore
- The Kitchen Toto (1987) - Dick Luis
- Jack the Ripper (1988) - DCS Arnold

== Television ==
Year	Title	Role	Notes
1965	Out of the Unknown	Nick Crandall	Episode 'Time in Advance'
1966	Intrigue	Gavin Grant	ABC Series 'All 13 episodes are believed to be lost.'
1975	Thriller	Charles Burns	Episode 'Murder Motel'
1976	The New Avengers	Cromwell	Episode 'To Catch a Rat'
1977	1990	Auckland	Episode 'Non-Citizen'
1977	Crown Court (TV series)	James Meetham	Episode ' Beauty and the Beast '
1978	The Sweeney	Eddie Monk	Episode ‘Money, Money, Money
1979	Flambards	Uncle Russell	Recurring
1992	Van der Valk	Alfred	Episode 'Proof of Life'
