= William Sylvester =

American actor (1922–1995)

- Sylvester in a promotional image for 2001: A Space Odyssey (1968).
- Born: January 31, 1922; Oakland, California, U.S.
- Died: January 25, 1995 (aged 72); Sacramento, California, U.S.
- Education: Royal Academy of Dramatic Art (1948)
- Occupation: Actor
- Years active: 1953–1978
- Spouses: Sheila Sweet (m. 1949; div. 1955) Veronica Hurst (m. 1955; div. 1966)
- Children: 3
- Relatives: Raymond Bailey (uncle)

William Sylvester (January 31, 1922 – January 25, 1995) was an American actor, chiefly known for his film and television work in the United Kingdom. He was a star of British B-movies and West End theatre in the 1950s and 1960s, but gained widespread recognition for his role as Dr. Heywood Floyd in the landmark science-fiction film 2001: A Space Odyssey (1968).

== Early life ==
William Sylvester was born in Oakland, California, the son of Italian immigrant Joseph Silvester (né Silvestri; 1899–1941) and his American wife, Gertrude Bailey Silvester (1898–1957). His uncle was actor Raymond Bailey.

He served in the U.S. Navy during the Second World War and settled in Britain after the war to pursue his interest in professional acting. He graduated from the Royal Academy of Dramatic Art in 1948.

== Career ==
=== Film ===
Sylvester became a staple of British B films at a time when American and Canadian actors were much in demand to give indigenous films some appeal in the United States. As a result, he gained top billing in one of his first films, House of Blackmail (1953), directed by the veteran filmmaker Maurice Elvey, for whom he also made What Every Woman Wants the following year. He also starred in such minor films as A Stranger Came Home (1954, for Hammer), Dublin Nightmare (1958), Offbeat (1961), Information Received (1961), Incident at Midnight (1963), Blind Corner (1964), and Ring of Spies (1964).

There were also lead roles in four British horror films: Gorgo (1961), Devil Doll (1964), Devils of Darkness (1965) and The Hand of Night (1968).

Sylvester was cast by director Stanley Kubrick as Dr. Heywood R. Floyd in the landmark film 2001 A Space Odyssey (1968). In spite of that notable role, Sylvester was never again cast in a prominent role in a motion picture, appearing instead in small parts and occasional supporting roles on television and in movies such as Busting (1974) (ironically directed by Peter Hyams, who would cast Roy Scheider as the character Dr. Heywood Floyd in 2010: The Year We Make Contact), The Hindenburg (1975) and Heaven Can Wait (1978).

=== Television ===
Among his many television credits were a 1959 BBC version of Shakespeare's Julius Caesar (playing Mark Antony), The Saint, The Baron, The High Chaparral, Harry O, Danger Man, Banacek, The Six Million Dollar Man, Quincy, M.E. and he was a regular on the one-season science-fiction series Gemini Man created by Steven Bochco.

=== Theater ===
Sylvester starred as Stanley Kowalski in the 1950 UK touring production of Tennessee Williams' A Streetcar Named Desire (opposite Betty Ann Davies as Blanche, Frances Hyland as Stella, and Theodore Bikel as Mitch). His West End theatre credits included Summer and Smoke (1952, Lyric Theatre), The Teahouse of the August Moon (1956, His Majesty's Theatre), The Andersonville Trial (1961, Mermaid Theatre), and Mourning Becomes Electra (1961, The Old Vic).

== Personal life ==
Sylvester was married twice. His second marriage, to actress Veronica Hurst, began in 1955 and ended in divorce in 1966. He had three children.

He retired from acting during the early 1980s, settling in Sacramento, California.

=== Death ===
Sylvester died of undisclosed causes in Sacramento, on January 25, 1995, six days before his 73rd birthday.

== Selected filmography ==
- Give Us This Day (1949) – Giovanni
- They Were Not Divided (1950) – American Soldier (uncredited)
- The Yellow Balloon (1953) – Len
- Appointment in London (1953) – Mac
- House of Blackmail (1953) – Jimmy
- Albert R.N. (1953) – Lt. 'Texas' Norton
- What Every Woman Wants (1954) – Jim Bames
- A Stranger Came Home (1954) – Philip Vickers
- Portrait of Alison (1956) – Dave Forrester
- High Tide at Noon (1957) – Alec Douglas
- Dublin Nightmare (1958) – John Kevin
- Whirlpool (1959) – Herman
- Offbeat (1961) – Layton / Steve Ross
- Gorgo (1961) – Sam Slade
- Information Received (1961) – Rick Hogan
- Incident at Midnight (1963) – Vince Warren
- Ring of Spies (1964) – Gordon Lonsdale
- Devil Doll (1964) – Mark English
- Blind Corner (1964) – Paul Gregory
- Devils of Darkness (1965) – Paul Baxter
- You Only Live Twice (1967) – Pentagon Official (uncredited)
- Red and Blue (1967) – Trumpeter
- 2001: A Space Odyssey (1968) – Dr. Heywood R. Floyd
- The Hand of Night (1968) – Paul Carver
- The Syndicate (1968) – Burt Hickey
- The Lawyer (1970) – Paul Harrison
- Don't Be Afraid of the Dark (1973) – Tom Henderson
- Busting (1974) – Mr. Weldman
- The Hindenburg (1975) – Luftwaffe Colonel
- Riding with Death (1976) – Leonard Driscoll
- Heaven Can Wait (1978) – Nuclear Reporter
- First Family (1980) – TV Commentator Howard
