= The Vulture (1966 film) =

Canadian horror film by Lawrence Huntington

- Theatrical poster.
- Directed by: Lawrence Huntington
- Written by: Lawrence Huntington
- Produced by: Lawrence Huntington executive Jack O. Lamont
- Starring: Robert Hutton; Akim Tamiroff; Broderick Crawford; Diane Clare
- Edited by: John S Smith
- Music by: Eric Spear
- Production companies: Homeric Films; Iliad Films; Film Financial Co Ltd
- Distributed by: Paramount Pictures
- Release dates: December 23, 1966 (Deming premiere); May 3, 1967
- Running time: 91 minutes
- Countries: Canada; United Kingdom; United States
- Language: English
- Budget: £50,000

The Vulture is a 1966 horror film directed by Lawrence Huntington and starring Robert Hutton, Akim Tamiroff, Broderick Crawford, and Diane Clare.

== Plot ==
One stormy night in Cornwall, schoolteacher Ellen West takes a shortcut across a graveyard, and witnesses a large bird with a human head emerging from a grave, seeing it fly away laughing maniacally and carrying a box in its talons. Ellen's hair has turned white overnight after the shock of her experience but, perhaps unsurprisingly, nobody believes her story.

The grave from which the creature emerged is that of Francis Real, an 18th-century seaman. A recently discovered parchment has suggested that Real had been buried alive with the corpse of a large 'loathsome' bird he kept as a pet, and that he had sworn vengeance on all descendants of Squire Stroud, the man who ordered his interment.

Two of these descendants, brothers Brian and Edward Stroud, live locally and their niece Trudy happens to be visiting. Trudy's husband Eric Lutens joins her on their planned holiday, and takes an interest in the mysterious events of the night before, especially after he finds a mutilated sheep in a clifftop cave. He starts to believe that the creature described by Miss West might be real.

Eric is a nuclear scientist, and a strong believer in scientific explanations. When he finds large, black feathers, he sends them to be analysed and discovers that they belong to a hunting bird not found anywhere in Europe. He visits local antiquarian Hans Koniglich, who confirms that the parchment is genuine, but who doubts the authenticity of the legends recorded there.

Brian Stroud, the present squire, is unconcerned by Eric's warnings but the next night, when he is enticed onto the balcony of his bedroom, he is snatched by the talons of a giant bird – his body is soon discovered in the cave. The police still have no time for Eric's theories, and nor does Brian's brother Edward, the new squire. Eric is convinced that the birdman has been created as a result of a monstrous scientific experiment, and he sends out enquiries as to whether anyone local has been using excessive amounts of electricity.

Eric's priority now is to protect his wife, so he drives her to a hotel far from Cornwall but, while they are away, Edward Stroud is murdered in a similar way to his brother. Koniglich calls Eric to say that clues have been found suggesting where the vulture man might be hiding, and Eric drives back to Cornwall, leaving his gun with Trudy. However, before he can begin a search for the creature, he learns that only one person could have performed the experiment – Koniglich.

Eric rushes to the antiquarian's house; he finds it deserted but breaks into the basement and finds a fully equipped laboratory, containing the skeleton of Francis Real. He also finds Trudy's handkerchief and realises that Koniglich has lured her there to be his final victim. Correctly surmising that she has been taken to the Vulture's lair, Eric arrives there and finds that Trudy is still alive, trapped in the cave. He reminds her that she has a gun and she shoots the Vulture who staggers onto the ledge outside, when Eric also shoots him. Koniglich falls to his death on the beach below.

== Cast ==
- Robert Hutton as Dr. Eric Lutens
- Akim Tamiroff as Prof. Hans Koniglich/the Vulture
- Broderick Crawford as Brian F. Stroud
- Diane Clare as Trudy Lutens
- Philip Friend as vicar
- Patrick Holt as Jarvis
- Annette Carell as Ellen West
- Edward Caddick as Melcher, the sexton
- Gordon Sterne as Edward Stroud
- Keith McConnell as Superintendent Wendell
- Margaret Robinson as nurse

== Production ==
The script was based on an original story by Huntington which was first known as Manutara. He sold it to producer Jack O. Lamont who managed to get some financing from Paramount provided American names were cast in the leads. The remainder of the £50,000 budget was raised from Britain's Homeric Films and NFFC along with Canada's Ihod Productions. The Vulture was written under the title Minotaur. The film was shot in Cornwall in 1965, on a budget of CAD$200,000.

== Release ==
The film was distributed by Paramount Pictures and premiered in Portland, Oregon, on 31 December 1966. The film was shown in black and white in the United States.

== Reception ==
The Monthly Film Bulletin wrote: "A pitifully stilted horror film, in which the characters stand around either speculating, scoffing or helpfully disbursing yards of background information, and in which the only moment of splendour comes with the appearance of the monster, seen coyly from the waist down as a pair of vast, knobby-kneed talons. Akim Tamiroff, hobbling about in flowing black cloak as a sort of reincarnation of Dr. Caligari, does his best with some fatuous dialogue: but the rest is ashes."

TV Guide awarded the film one out of four stars, writing " Ridiculous casting makes this one a laugh riot."

== Works cited ==
- Turner, D. John, ed. (1987). Canadian Feature Film Index: 1913–1985. Canadian Film Institute. ISBN 0660533642.
