= The Hand of Night =

1968 British film by Frederic Goode

- Theatrical poster;
- Directed by: Frederic Goode
- Written by: Bruce Stewart
- Produced by: Harry Field
- Starring: William Sylvester; Diane Clare; Aliza Gur
- Cinematography: William Jordan
- Edited by: John Blair (supervising)
- Music by: John Shakespeare
- Production company: Associated British Pathé
- Distributed by: Associated British-Pathé
- Release date: 6 October 1968 (UK); (general release)
- Running time: 90 minutes
- Country: United Kingdom
- Language: English

The Hand of Night (also known as Beast of Morocco) is a 1968 British horror film directed by Frederic Goode and starring William Sylvester, Diane Clare and Aliza Gur. It was written by Bruce Stewart.

== Plot ==
Paul Carver is an Englishman who has recently lost his wife and children in a car accident. Waking from a nightmare, we find Carver on a plane traveling to Morocco, where he attempts to meet with a doctor, only to discover that the doctor has died. In despair, Carver ends up at the home of a German archaeologist, Otto Gunther, whom he met on the plane. It is here, in the midst of a party, that Carver first encounters the two women who will determine his destiny: Gunther's assistant, Chantal, and the mysterious Marissa. Grieving the loss of his loved ones and crippled by survivor's guilt, Carver must choose between life, represented by Chantal, and death, represented by Marissa.

== Cast ==
- William Sylvester as Carver
- Diane Clare as Chantal
- Edward Underdown as Gunther
- Aliza Gur as Marisa
- Terence De Marney as Omar
- William Dexter as Leclerq
- Sylvia Marriott as Mrs Perry
- Avril Sadler as Carver's wife
- Angela Lovell as air hostess
- Maria Hallowi as nurse

== Reception ==
Monthly Film Bulletin wrote: "The pink mist that billows from the eye socket of a skull throughout the opening credits augurs both the pretensions and the weaknesses of this rather dull exercise in the macabre. Despite some sterling decomposition work by the make-up department, the film relies heavily on old Hammer production tricks without contributing any original variations of its own; and the story is not helped by the portentous rhetoric of lines like "I too have lived in the shadows". William Sylvester leads the group of sweat-streaked humans battling indomitably against the unknown – in this case a species of lily-livered vampirism that would make Dracula turn in his shallow grave."

The Radio Times Guide to Films gave the film 1/5 stars, writing: "Awkwardly combining the Dracula myth with middle-eastern mummy motifs, but bringing nothing of its own to the terror table except exotic locations, this tedious sub-Hammer horror filler is further eroded by bland performances."
