= Stanley Meadows =

British actor (1931–2025)

Stanley Meadows (14 July 1931 – 16 September 2025) was an English actor.

== Life and career ==
Meadows was born in Stepney, London on 14 July 1931, the son of a sweet shop owner in Stepney Green. He won a scholarship to Forest School, in Epping Forest, and eventually graduated from The Royal Academy of Dramatic Art in 1955. After graduating he worked as a barman, storeman, waiter, and shipping representative, while also performing in a variety of repertory companies. He worked with Laurence Olivier, John Gielgud and Harold Pinter, and starred in a number of plays on ITV.

As his career developed further, Meadows made frequent appearances in British films and became something of a stalwart of British television series, including Public Eye, Undermind, Randall and Hopkirk and Widows (Eddie Rawlins).

Meadows died on 16 September 2025, at the age of 94.

== Filmography ==
| Year | Title | Role | Notes |
|---|---|---|---|
| 1953 | Three Steps to the Gallows | 2nd Clerk - Travel Agent | Uncredited |
| 1959 | The Mummy | Attendant | |
| 1960 | Jackpot | Police Intelligence Officer on Radio | Uncredited |
| 1961 | Payroll | Bowen | |
| 1962 | A Prize of Arms | Sgt. White | Uncredited |
| 1962 | Live Now, Pay Later | Second Bailiff On Doorstep | Uncredited |
| 1963 | The Desperate People | Luther Harris | |
| 1963 | Panic | Tom | |
| 1964 | The Masque of the Red Death | Guard | Uncredited |
| 1964 | Clash by Night | George Brett | |
| 1964 | The Saint | Bob Stryker in "The High Fence" | |
| 1964 | The Main Chance | Joe Hayes | |
| 1965 | The Ipcress File | Inspector Pat Keightley | |
| 1965 | You Must Be Joking! | Barry Morris | Uncredited |
| 1965 | The Night Caller | Det. Tom Grant | |
| 1966 | Bat Out of Hell | Ned Tallboy | Five episodes |
| 1966 | Kaleidoscope | Dominion Captain | |
| 1967 | The Terrornauts | Ben Keller | |
| 1967 | The Avengers | Erskine in "The Hidden Tiger" | |
| 1967 | The Naked Runner | Psychiatrist | Uncredited |
| 1968 | The Fixer | Gronfein | |
| 1970 | Performance | Rosebloom | |
| 1981 | Prends ta rolls et va pointer | Lord Archibald Swanson | |
| 1984 | La 7ème cible | | |
