= Carole Gray =

British actress and dancer

- Born: 1938 (age 87–88); Bulawayo, Rhodesia
- Other names: "The Scream Queen" (nickname)
- Occupations: Actress, former dancer
- Spouse: Peter Graham Du Toit (December 1957 - ?) ( divorced)

Carole Gray (born 1938) is a British actress and dancer, who was born in Southern Rhodesia, known for her roles throughout Britain in 1960s West End musicals and her roles in films.

== Early life and career ==
Born in Bulawayo, Rhodesia (now part of Zimbabwe), she arrived in England in 1956 and began her 12-year acting career by appearing in the television series, The Avengers. She made her first notable film appearance as Cliff Richard's girlfriend, Toni, in The Young Ones (1961).

Shortly after, she appeared predominantly in horror films like Curse of the Fly, Devils of Darkness, and Island of Terror, and was even given the nickname, "Scream Queen". In 1968, she returned to Africa where she appeared on stage in plays like Harvey in 1968, Fiddler on the Roof in 1969, and Taubie Kushlick's production of No, No, Nanette at the Alexander Theatre in Johannesburg, 1972.

== Personal life ==
Carole married her first husband, Peter Graham Du Toit, in December 1957. The two later divorced, and Gray remarried to diamond heir Douglas Cullinan (who was formerly married to actress Diane Todd from 1965-1975).

== Filmography ==
=== Film ===
- The Prince and the Showgirl (1957) - Dancer (uncredited)
- The Young Ones (1961) - Toni
- Rattle of a Simple Man (1964) - District Nurse
- Devils of Darkness (1965) - Tania
- Curse of the Fly (1965) - Patricia Stanley
- Duel at Sundown (1965) - Nancy Greenwood
- Island of Terror (1966) - Toni Merrill
- The Brides of Fu Manchu (1966) - Michel Merlin
- Oh! What a Lovely War (1969) - Chorus Girl (uncredited) (final film role)

=== Television ===
Year	Title	Role	Notes
1957	On Stage - London		1 episode
1962	The Saint	Josie Claval	Episode: "The Covetous Headsman"
1965	The Third Man	Velia Dolgelta	Episode: "Man at the Top"
1966	The Avengers	Nicki	Episode: "Quick-Quick Slow Death"
