= Island of Terror =

1966 British film by Terence Fisher

- Theatrical poster
- Directed by: Terence Fisher
- Written by: Edward Mann; Al Ramsen
- Produced by: Tom Blakely
- Starring: Peter Cushing; Edward Judd; Carole Gray; Eddie Byrne; Sam Kydd; Niall McGinnis
- Cinematography: Reg Wyer
- Edited by: Thelma Connell
- Music by: Malcolm Lockyer
- Production company: Planet Film Productions
- Distributed by: Planet Film Distributors
- Release dates: 3 June 1966 (Liverpool; premiere); 20 June 1966 (UK)
- Running time: 89 minutes
- Country: United Kingdom
- Language: English
- Budget: £70,000
- Box office: 117,645 admissions (France)

Island of Terror (also known as Night of the Silicates and The Night the Creatures Came) is a 1966 British science-fiction horror film directed by Terence Fisher and starring Peter Cushing, Edward Judd and Carole Gray. The story is about a group of scientists investigating mysterious deaths on a remote island off the coast of Ireland, which are linked with the cutting-edge scientific experiments occurring there.

The film was produced and distributed by Planet Films. Island of Terror was released in the United Kingdom on 20 June 1966. In the United States, it was released by Universal Studios on a double bill with The Projected Man (1966).

== Plot ==
On the remote Petrie's Island off the east coast of Ireland, farmer Ian Bellows goes missing and his wife contacts the local police. Constable John Harris finds the farmer dead in a cave without a single bone in his body and fetches the island's physician, Dr Reginald Landers, who is unable to determine what happened. He journeys to the mainland to seek the help of a noted London pathologist, Dr Brian Stanley. Stanley is unable even to hypothesize what could have happened, so both men seek out Dr David West, an expert on bones and bone diseases. Although Stanley and Landers interrupt West's quiet evening at home with jetsetter Toni Merrill, West is intrigued by the problem and agrees to accompany the two doctors back to Petrie's Island to examine the corpse. In order for them to reach the island quickly, Merrill offers the use of her father's private helicopter in exchange for the three men allowing her to come along on the adventure.

Once back at Petrie's Island, Merrill's father's helicopter is forced to return to the mainland so he can use it, leaving the foursome stranded on Petrie. West and Stanley learn that a group of oncology researchers led by Dr Lawrence Phillips have a secluded castle laboratory on the island. Paying a visit to Phillips' lab reveals that he and his colleagues are just as dead (and boneless) as Bellows. Reasoning that whatever it is must have begun in that lab, West, Stanley and Landers take Phillips' notes back to the inn where they are staying to study them. They learn that in his quest to cure cancer, Phillips may have accidentally created a new life form from the silicon atom.

Thinking the doctors are at the castle, Constable Harris bikes up there to tell them about the discovery of a dead, boneless horse, only to wander into the laboratory's "test animals" room and be killed by an offscreen tentacled creature, the result of Dr Phillips's experiments. The creatures, dubbed "silicates" by West and Stanley, kill their victims by injecting a bone-dissolving enzyme into their bodies. The silicates prove difficult to kill, as Stanley, West and Merrill learn when Landers tries to kill one at the castle with an axe, but is himself killed. During this first encounter they learn that the silicates reproduce by dividing. Later discovering that they divide every six hours, the scientists calculate that the island will be totally infested in just a few days.

After learning all they can from the late Dr Phillips's notes, West and Stanley recruit the islanders, led by Roger Campbell, to attack the silicates. Their initial attempts are unsuccessful. But when one is found dead, West and Stanley deduce the creatures can be destroyed using the rare isotope Strontium-90. They obtain enough isotope to contaminate a herd of cattle and the silicates feed on these. At first, there seems to be no effect. Silicates break into the community hall and kill many islanders. West, Merrill, and some surviving residents barricade themselves in the clinic with Stanley until the Strontium 90 kills the silicates.

The story ends with evacuation and medical teams inbound from the mainland, and West commenting on how fortunate they were that this outbreak was confined to an island. Had it happened on the mainland, he notes, they might never have stopped them in time. This sets up an epilogue and a visit to the satellite programme, in Japan, where the technicians are duplicating Phillips' work with the inevitable result. A technician walks down a corridor, hears a strange noise and investigates before screaming.

== Cast ==
- Peter Cushing as Dr Brian Stanley
- Edward Judd as Dr David West
- Carole Gray as Toni Merrill
- Eddie Byrne as Dr Reginald Landers
- Sam Kydd as Constable John Harris
- Niall MacGinnis as Roger Campbell
- James Caffrey as Peter Argyle
- Liam Gaffney as Ian Bellows
- Roger Heathcote as Dunley
- Keith Bell as Halsey
- Margaret Lacey as Wld woman
- Shay Gorman as Morton
- Peter Forbes-Robertson as Dr Lawrence Phillips
- Richard Bidlake as Carson
- Joyce Hemson as Mrs. Bellows

== Production ==
Richard Gordon read The Night the Silicates Came. a screenplay by American writers Edward Mann and Alan Ramsen, and thought it was perfect for Planet Films, partnering with Tom Blakey. Gordon asked Blakely to modify the script for character depth. Gordon had immediately thought of Terence Fisher to direct, despite Fisher having just made Dracula: Prince of Darkness for Hammer: he was pushed into accepting a two-picture deal by his wife Morag, who had firsthand experience of how frustrated Fisher was when not working.

When Peter Cushing was brought on board, Gordon had to adjust the shooting schedule to accommodate the busy actor.

Shooting took place at the regular Hammer location, Black Park, near Slough, plus St Hubert’s House in Gerrards Cross, a large hunting lodge which became Dr. Phillips’ laboratory. The shoot was beset by rain, fog, and freezing cold.

== Release ==
=== Rating ===
To get a PG rating, the British cinematic release was cut by a few seconds by the BBFC to remove a brief shot of blood spurts after a hand is severed by an axe.

=== Home media ===
DD Video released a collector's edition DVD on 17 Jan 2005. It was released on Blu-ray by Import Vendor on 28 Oct 2014.

== Reception ==
=== Box office ===
The film performed "fairly well" at the box office.

=== Critical response ===
The Monthly Film Bulletin wrote: "Although the plot is little more than a rehash of Day of the Triffids, it is quite effectively concocted and features some sluggishly mobile jellied turtles, each waving a snake-like tentacle ... In fact, it is really Reg Wyer's colour photography, with its pale greys, browns and steely blues offset by patches of bright colour, together with the equally attractive art direction and special effects, which make this otherwise routine horror epic (with a naïve message about scientific responsibilities) worth a look."

Author and film critic Leonard Maltin awarded the film two out of a possible four stars. Maltin commended the film's acting and direction, but felt that the result was "nothing special."

AllMovie's Brian J. Dillard wrote: "This creepy yet clunky sci-fi-horror flick boasts one of the coolest monsters ever to grace the silver screen—radioactive silicone beings ("silicates") that suck the calcium right out of your bones. ...With the exception of these creatures du jour and the eerie electronic sounds that emanate from them, Island of Terror is a fairly standard-issue lab-coats-versus-creatures flick in the mold of superior genre fare such as 1954's Them."

TV Guide wrote: "A rather shaky plot is boosted by Cushing's ever effective performance and Fisher's tight direction."

Radio Times called the film "long on logic but high on hysteria."

Leslie Halliwell said: "Horror hokum, moderately done."

DVD Talk gave it three and a half stars and called it "an immensely enjoyable sci-fi potboiler."

== Legacy ==
David Robert Mitchell referenced Island of Terror's feeling of "waiting for the creature to pop up" as an inspiration for It Follows (2014).

== See also ==
- Night of the Big Heat
