= David Davies (Welsh actor) =

Welsh actor (1906–1974)

- Davies in Only Two Can Play (1962)
- Born: 3 April 1906; Brynmawr, Brecknockshire, Wales
- Died: June 1974 (aged 68); Carmarthen, Wales
- Occupation: Actor
- Years active: 1942–1972

David Lewis Davies (3 April 1906 – June 1974), was a Welsh stage and film actor. At 6 feet 4 inches tall, he was often cast as a heavy, police officer or in a military or authoritarian role, such as Mr. Arrow, the first mate and enforcer outwitted by Long John Silver in Disney's 1950 Treasure Island. Davies appeared mainly in British film and television programmes, and was in demand for films set in Wales, such as The Three Weird Sisters (1948), The Last Days of Dolwyn (1949), Tiger Bay (1959) and Only Two Can Play (1962).

== Career ==
Davies was born in the town of Brynmawr, Brecknockshire, South Wales, in 1906. He moved to Essex where he became a policeman in 1927 for the Southend Borough Constabulary, which later amalgamated into Essex Police in 1969. He was forced into medical retirement with a duodenal ulcer on 27 April 1937.

Davies took up acting soon after. In 1942 he appeared at the Stoll Theatre in London in the role of Sergeant Malone in the operetta Rose-Marie. At 6' 4" Davies, found himself often portraying authority figures, especially police officers.

In 1948 he appeared in the Dylan Thomas-written film The Three Weird Sisters as a police officer. He continued his connection with Welsh cinema in 1949 when he took the role of Septimus in The Last Days of Dolwyn and as a burly stranger in the comedy A Run for Your Money. In 1950 he took on the role of Mr. Arrow, the first mate of "The Hispaniola" who comes to an unfortunate end at the hands of Robert Newton's Long John Silver in the Disney live action adaptation of Treasure Island. That year he also appeared in the British Drama The Angel with the Trumpet as a Nazi leader.

By 1951 Davies was becoming a regular face in emerging British television, appearing in The Passing Show and as Ben in Midshipman Barney. He continued to appear in popular films of the time, but normally in walk-on character parts, such as a police officer in The Lavender Hill Mob (1951). He received the more substantive role of Benson in the British crime thriller Mystery Junction (1951) and gained a credited role as a chauffeur in the 1952 mystery Drama Mr. Denning Drives North. He continued to work chiefly in Britain for the majority of the 1950s, with roles in the fantasy-comedy Miss Robin Hood (1952), The Story of Robin Hood and His Merrie Men (1952) and appeared alongside Tod Slaughter in Murder at Scotland Yard (1952).

Davies appeared sporadically in film and television during the mid-1950s, with uncredited roles in Forbidden Cargo (1954) and The Long Arm (1956), but finished the decade with regular appearances on British television. He also returned to films with roles in I Was Monty's Double (1958), Tiger Bay (1959), The 39 Steps (1959) and Ben-Hur (1959).

Between 1959 and 1960 Davies appeared as a regular character, Jim Blake, in the British television series Probation Officer, and followed this with guest roles in long-running shows such as The Adventures of Robin Hood (1960), Gideon's Way (1964-1966), Richard the Lionheart (1963) and The Avengers (1963). In 1964 he appeared in Roger Corman's The Masque of the Red Death and a year later he took the part of the captain of Galtesund in The Heroes of Telemark. After a brief stint as Lt. Comm. Prince in the long running British soap opera Coronation Street (1972), he made his final screen outing in the 1971 adaptation of Dylan Thomas' Under Milk Wood, playing the role of Utah Watkins. Davies died in June 1974 aged 68.

== Selected filmography ==
- The Three Weird Sisters (1948) – Police Sergeant
- The Last Days of Dolwyn (1949) – Septimus
- A Run for Your Money (1949) – The Burly Stranger
- The Angel with the Trumpet (1950) – Nazi leader
- Treasure Island (1950) – Mr. Arrow
- Pool of London (1951) – Officer on the Dunbar (uncredited)
- The Lavender Hill Mob (1951) – City Policeman
- Mystery Junction (1951) – Benson
- Mr. Denning Drives North (1952) – Chauffeur
- The Story of Robin Hood and His Merrie Men (1952) – Forester
- King of the Underworld (1952) – George
- Miss Robin Hood (1952) – Sergeant (uncredited)
- Murder at Scotland Yard (1952) – George
- Forbidden Cargo (1954) – (uncredited)
- The Long Arm (1956) – Welsh Police Constable
- I Was Monty's Double (1958) – Control M.P.
- Tiger Bay (1959) – Desk Sgt.
- The 39 Steps (1959) – Theatre Commissioner (uncredited)
- Ben-Hur (1959) – Quaestor (uncredited)
- A Story of David (1961) – Abner
- The Treasure of Monte Cristo (1961) – Van Ryman
- The Frightened City (1961) – Alf Peters
- King of Kings (1961) – Burly Man
- Only Two Can Play (1962) – Benyon
- The Pot Carriers (1962) – Prison Officer Tom
- Gang War (1962) – Jim Alexis
- Ring of Spies (1964) - Inspector (uncredited)
- The Masque of the Red Death (1964) - Lead Villager
- The Heroes of Telemark (1965) - Captain of 'Galtesund'
- Under Milk Wood (1971) – Utah Watkins (final film role)
