= Tucker McGuire =

American actress (1913–1988)

- Born: January 29, 1913
- Died: August 3, 1988 (aged 75)
- Occupation: Actress
- Spouse: Tom Macaulay

Anne Tucker McGuire (January 29, 1913 – August 3, 1988) was an American-born actress who appeared largely in British films and television. She married actor Tom Macaulay.

She appeared in the 1949 West End musical Her Excellency.

In 1952 she played Patrick Barr's assistant and secretary in the seven-part British television series, Inspector Morley: Late of Scotland Yard, which also starred Dorothy Bramhall; Arthur Howard; Tod Slaughter; and Johnny Briggs.

In 1958, she appeared as Margaret "Molly" Brown in the film A Night to Remember, about the infamous ocean liner Titanic, in which she insisted Lifeboat No 6 should turn round to help rescue passengers, appealing to the other women to "Come on, girls. Row!" According to director Roy Ward Baker, McGuire was the only cast member who caused him any trouble on the film, describing her as "ornery," and saying "I don't know what got into her."

== Filmography ==
Year	Title	Role	Notes
1936	Strangers on Honeymoon	Bride	
1937	Clothes and the Woman	Joan Moore	
1938	Climbing High	Patsey	
1939	Shipyard Sally	Linda Marsh	
1942	The Night Has Eyes	Doris	
1952	King of the Underworld	Eileen Trotter	
1953	Murder at Scotland Yard	Eileen Trotter	
1953	Black Orchid	American Woman	
1953	Projeto M-7	Myrna	(scenes deleted)
1955	Reluctant Bride	Claire	
1957	The Story of Esther Costello	Miss Moore	Uncredited
1958	A Night to Remember	Mrs. Margaret 'Molly' Brown	
1958	The Sheriff of Fractured Jaw	Luke's Wife	
1970	The Revolutionary	Lady Guest	
1972	Ooh... You Are Awful	American Woman	
1985	D.A.R.Y.L.	Mrs. Bergen	(final film role)
