= Richard Todd =

Irish actor (1919–2009)

Richard Todd OBE
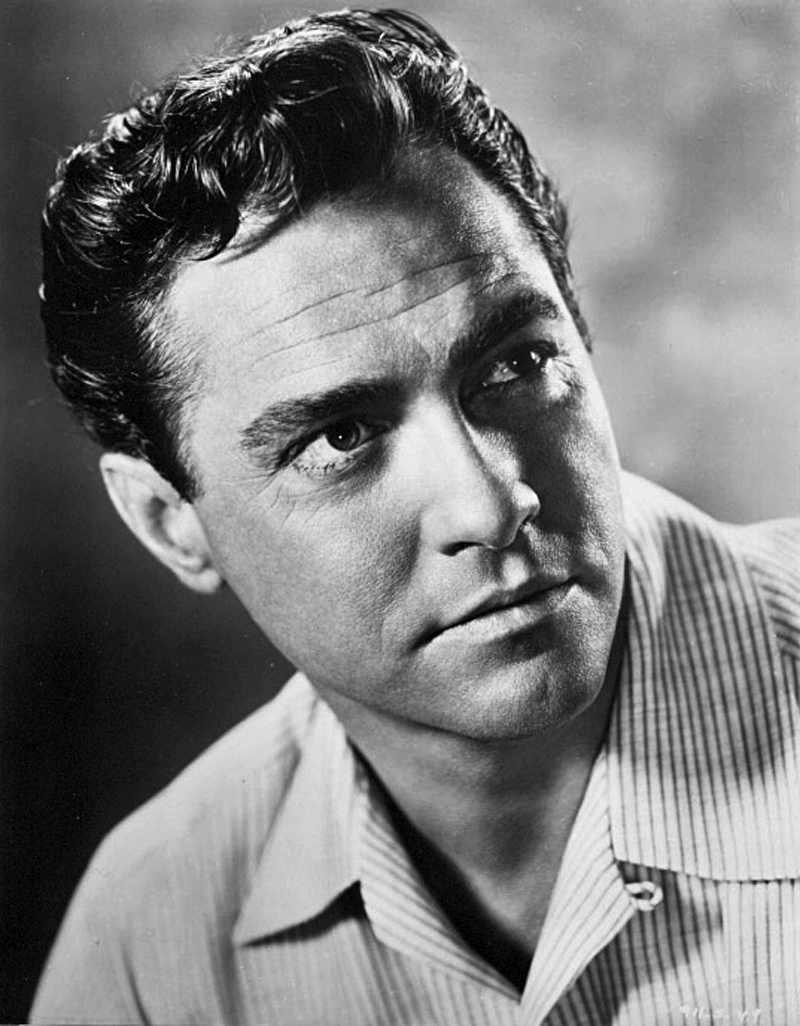
- Publicity photo of Todd, c. 1959
- Born: Richard Andrew Palethorpe-Todd; 11 June 1919; Dublin, Ireland
- Died: 3 December 2009 (aged 90); Grantham, Lincolnshire, England
- Burial place: St. Guthlac's Church, Little Ponton, Lincolnshire, England
- Education: Italia Conti Academy of Theatre Arts; Royal Military College, Sandhurst
- Occupation: Actor
- Spouse(s): Catherine Grant-Bogle (m. 1949; div. 1970) Virginia Mailer (m. 1970; div. 1992)
- Partner: Patricia Nelson
- Children: 5
- Military career
- Allegiance: United Kingdom
- Branch: British Army
- Service years: 1941–1946
- Rank: Captain
- Service number: 180649
- Units: King's Own Yorkshire Light Infantry; Parachute Regiment
- Conflicts: Second World War; Operation Tonga; Operation Overlord; Palestine

Richard Andrew Palethorpe-Todd OBE (11 June 1919 – 3 December 2009) was an Irish-British actor, known for his leading man roles of the 1950s. He received a Golden Globe Award for Most Promising Newcomer – Male, and an Academy Award for Best Actor nomination and a Golden Globe Award for Best Actor nomination for his performance as Corporal Lachlan MacLachlan in the 1949 film The Hasty Heart.

His other notable roles include Jonathan Cooper in Stage Fright (1950), Wing Commander Guy Gibson in The Dam Busters (1955), Sir Walter Raleigh in The Virgin Queen (1955), and Major John Howard in The Longest Day (1962). Prior to his acting career, Todd was a captain in the British Army during the Second World War, fighting in the D-Day landings as a member of the 7th (Light Infantry) Parachute Battalion.

== Early life and career ==
Richard Todd was born in Dublin. His father, Andrew William Palethorpe-Todd, was an Irish physician and an international Irish rugby player who gained three caps for his country. Richard spent a few of his childhood years in India, where his father, an officer in the British Army, served as a physician. Later his family moved to Devon, and Todd attended Shrewsbury School.

Upon leaving school, Todd trained for a potential military career at Sandhurst before beginning his acting training at the Italia Conti Academy in London. This change in career led to estrangement from his mother. When he learned at the age of 19 that she had committed suicide, he did not grieve long (or so he admitted in later life).

He first appeared professionally as an actor at the Open Air Theatre, Regent's Park in 1936 in a production of Twelfth Night. He played in regional theatres and then co-founded the Dundee Repertory Theatre in Scotland in 1939. He also appeared as an extra in British films including Good Morning, Boys (1937), A Yank at Oxford (1938) and Old Bones of the River (1939).

== Military service ==
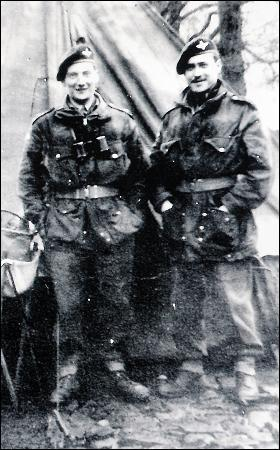
Lieutenants Tony Bowler (left) and Richard Todd of the 7th (Light Infantry) Parachute Battalion in Wales prior to D-Day, 1944.

Todd enlisted soon after the outbreak of the Second World War, entering the Royal Military College, Sandhurst in late 1939. On 29 January 1941, he was one of 26 cadets injured when 'D' Block of New College was hit by a German bomb in an attack by the Luftwaffe. In his memoirs, he describes seeing the bomb pass through the ceiling in front of him before he was blown out of the building by its blast, landing on a grass bank and suffering lacerations; five cadets were killed in the incident. Todd passed out in the spring of 1941. On the day he received his commission, he tried to join several friends at the Café de Paris in London, but could not get a table booked for the evening. That evening, the venue was destroyed in an air raid and 15 newly commissioned subalterns were killed.

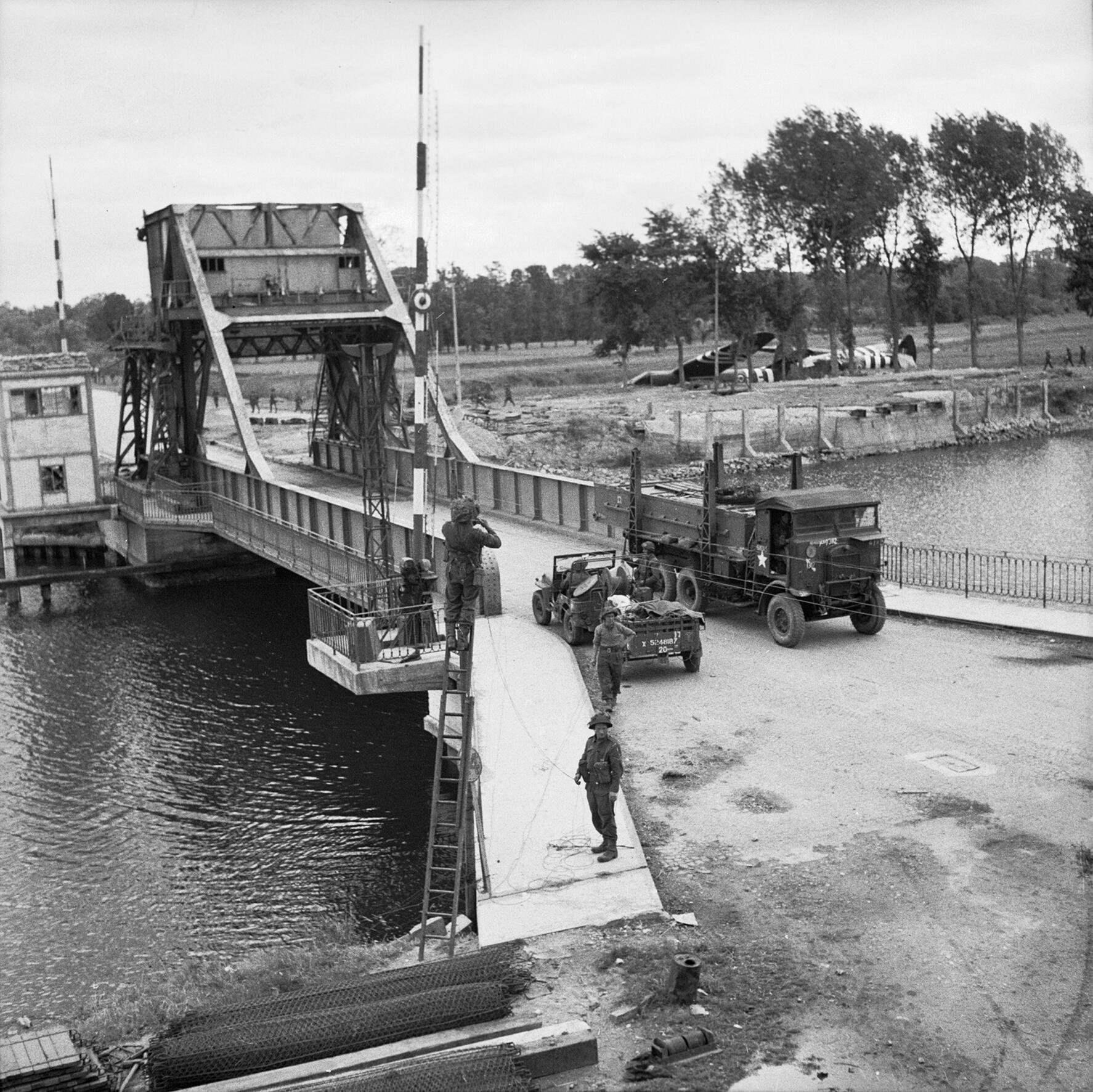
Pegasus Bridge, where Lieutenant Todd landed on D-Day, 6 June 1944.

He was commissioned into the 2nd/4th Battalion of the King's Own Yorkshire Light Infantry (KOYLI). Following arctic warfare training in Iceland he returned to the UK as a lieutenant (having been promoted to that rank on 1 October 1942). For a short while he was posted, at his request, as liaison officer to the 42nd Armoured Division then applied to join the Parachute Regiment to have a better chance at seeing action. He was accepted and after training was posted to the 7th (Light Infantry) Parachute Battalion, which formed part of the 5th Parachute Brigade of the 6th Airborne Division, commanded by Major General Richard Gale. On 6 June 1944, he participated in Operation Tonga during the D-Day landings. He was among the first British soldiers to land in Normandy and the first Irishman. His battalion parachuted after glider-borne forces had landed to capture the Pegasus Bridge near Caen. During the operation he met Major John Howard on the bridge and was involved in helping to repulse counter-attacks by the German forces in the area. Five days after D-Day, while still in the bridge defence area, he was promoted to captain. Todd later played Howard in the 1962 film The Longest Day, recreating these events.

After three months fighting in Normandy, the 6th Airborne Division returned to the UK to reconstitute and went back to the continent three months later as emergency reinforcements to halt the Battle of the Bulge the German offensive in the Ardennes. Short of transport as they advanced into Germany, Todd, as the motor transport officer, was responsible for gathering a rag-tag selection of commandeered vehicles to ferry troops forward. After VE day, the division returned to the UK for a few weeks, then was sent on counter-insurgency operations in Palestine. During this posting he was seriously injured when his Jeep overturned, breaking both shoulders and receiving a concussion. He returned to the UK to be demobilised in 1946.

== Career ==
=== Associated British Picture Corporation ===
After the war, Todd was unsure what direction to take in his career. His former agent, Robert Lennard, had become a casting agent for Associated British Picture Corporation and advised him to try out for the Dundee Repertory Company. Todd did so, performing in plays such as Claudia, where he appeared with Catherine Grant-Bogle, who became his first wife. Lennard arranged for a screen test and Associated British offered him a seven-year contract in 1948. Todd was cast in the lead in For Them That Trespass (1949), directed by Alberto Cavalcanti. The film was a minor hit and Todd's career was launched.

Todd had appeared in the Dundee Repertory stage version of John Patrick's play The Hasty Heart, portraying the role of Yank and was chosen to appear in the 1948 London stage version of the play, this time in the leading role of Cpl. Lachlan McLachlan. This led to his being cast in that role in the film adaptation of the play, filmed in Britain, alongside Ronald Reagan and Patricia Neal for Warner Bros. (which was a part owner of Associated British). Todd was nominated for the Academy Award for Best Actor for the role in 1949. He was also voted favourite British male film star in Britain's National Film Awards. The film was the tenth most popular movie at the British box office in 1949.

Todd was now much in demand. He was lent to Constellation Films to appear in the thriller The Interrupted Journey (1949). Alfred Hitchcock then used him in Stage Fright (1950), opposite Marlene Dietrich and Jane Wyman – Hitchcock's first British film since 1939. Associated British put him in the drama Portrait of Clare (1950), which did not perform well at the box office. Neither did Flesh and Blood (1951) for London Films, in which Todd had a dual role. Director King Vidor offered Todd a lead in Lightning Strikes Twice (1951), for Warners. Far more popular was The Story of Robin Hood and His Merrie Men (1952), in which Todd played the title role for Walt Disney Productions.

Associated British put him in 24 Hours of a Woman's Life (1952), with Merle Oberon. The Rank Organisation borrowed him for Venetian Bird (1952), directed by Ralph Thomas. Todd turned down the lead in The Red Beret because he disliked the script. Disney reunited the Robin Hood team in The Sword and the Rose (1953), with Todd as Charles Brandon, 1st Duke of Suffolk. It was not as popular as Robin Hood in the U.S. but performed well in Europe. The same went for Disney's Rob Roy: The Highland Rogue (1953), in which Todd played the title role. Disney pulled back on making costume films as a result.

In 1953, he appeared in a BBC television adaptation of the novel Wuthering Heights as Heathcliff. Nigel Kneale, responsible for the adaptation, said the production came about purely because Todd had turned up at the BBC and told them that he would like to play Heathcliff for them. Kneale had only a week to write the script, as the broadcast was rushed into production.

=== 20th Century Fox ===
Todd's career received a boost when 20th Century-Fox signed him to a non-exclusive contract and cast him as the United States Senate Chaplain Peter Marshall in the film version of Catherine Marshall's best selling biography A Man Called Peter (1955), which was a popular success.

Even more popular was The Dam Busters (1955) in which Todd played Wing Commander Guy Gibson. This was the most successful film at the British box office in 1955 and became the defining role of Todd's movie career.

The success of Man Called Peter led 20th Century Fox to offer Todd a four-picture contract. Associated British signed the actor to a new contract to make one film a year, but which enabled him to make "outside" movies. Todd's first film for Fox under the new deal was The Virgin Queen (1955), playing Sir Walter Raleigh opposite Bette Davis' Queen Elizabeth I. It did not do as well as Peter. He agreed to appear in Loser Takes All but had to pull out when that film was delayed.

In France, Todd played Axel Fersen opposite Michèle Morgan in Marie Antoinette Queen of France (1956), which was popular in France but not widely seen elsewhere. Fox cast him in D-Day the Sixth of June (1956), opposite Robert Taylor, which was a mild success.

Yangtse Incident: The Story of H.M.S. Amethyst (1957) was an attempt to repeat the success of The Dam Busters, with the same director (Michael Anderson) and Todd playing another real-life hero. It was popular in Britain but not on the scale of The Dam Busters.

He was Dunois, Bastard of Orléans in Saint Joan (1957), directed by Otto Preminger.

Chase a Crooked Shadow (1958) was a thriller with director Anderson for Associated British. Intent to Kill (1958) was another thriller, which he was forced to do under his contract with Fox. He returned to war films with Danger Within (1958), a POW story. Then there were more thrillers, with Never Let Go (1960), directed by John Guillermin and co-starring Peter Sellers in a rare straight acting role; Todd gave what has been called one of his best performances.

Few of these films had been overly popular but Todd was still the top-billed star of The Long and the Short and the Tall (1961), with Laurence Harvey and Richard Harris, for Associated British. He tried comedy with Don't Bother to Knock (1961), again for Associated British in conjunction with Todd's own company, Haileywood Films. This was followed by The Hellions (1961), shot in South Africa.

=== Decline as a star ===
Todd's cinema career rapidly declined in the 1960s as the counter-culture movement in the arts became fashionable in Britain, with social-realist dramas commercially replacing the more middle-class orientated dramatic productions that Todd's performance character-type had previously excelled in.

The Boys (1962) was a courtroom drama film in which Todd played the lead prosecuting barrister. He had a good part among the many stars in Fox's The Longest Day (1962), playing British Major John Howard whom Todd knew during the airborne action just before and on D-Day as he, Lt. Richard Todd, himself had actually taken part in the 1944 landings. (In an odd twist, another actor, Patrick Jordan played the role of Lt. Todd in the movie); this was his biggest hit for some time. He appeared in The Very Edge (1963), a thriller, then he played Harry Sanders in two films for Harry Alan Towers: Death Drums Along the River (1963) and Coast of Skeletons (1965). He also had a small role in Anderson's Operation Crossbow (1965).

In 1964. he was a member of the jury at the 14th Berlin International Film Festival.

He had a supporting part in The Battle of the Villa Fiorita (1965) and the lead in The Love-Ins (1968).

Todd claims William Wyler offered him the lead in The Collector but the actor felt he was miscast and persuaded him not to cast him. "It was not the first time that I had talked myself out of a picture — there had been The Guns of Navarone, League of Gentlemen and Ice Cold in Alex — but this latest stupidity of mine came when I desperately needed to make another important international film."

=== Later career ===
In the 1970s, Todd gained new fans when he appeared as the reader for Radio Four's Morning Story. In the 1980s, his distinctive voice was heard as narrator of Wings Over the World, a 13-part documentary series about the history of aviation shown on Arts & Entertainment television. He appeared before the camera in the episode about the Lancaster bomber. Todd continued to act on television, including roles in Virtual Murder; Silent Witness and in the Doctor Who story "Kinda" in 1982. In 1989, he appeared in the first episode of the sixth season of Murder, She Wrote in which he played Colonel Alex Schofield in the episode titled "Appointment in Athens".

He formed Triumph Theatre Productions with Duncan C. Weldon and Paul Elliott in the late 1960s. This company produced more than 100 plays, musicals and pantomimes all over the country; some of them starred Todd.

His acting career extended into his 80s, and he made several appearances in British shows such as Heartbeat and The Royal. He appeared in The Royal as Hugh Hurst, a retired solicitor, in the episode "Kiss and Tell" (2003); his last appearance in Heartbeat was as Major Harold Beecham in the 2007 episode "Seeds of Destruction".

Richard Todd was appointed an Officer of the Order of the British Empire (OBE) in 1993.

He was the subject of This Is Your Life on two occasions: in March 1960 when he was surprised by Eamonn Andrews at the BBC's Lime Grove Studios; and in November 1988 when Michael Aspel surprised him on stage at the Theatre Royal Windsor.

Richard Todd appeared in the "Midsomer Murders" episode "Birds of Prey" (2003) as Charles Edmonton. In the episode, his character is killed by Dr. Naomi Sinclair. He dies after receiving a fatal injection while asleep.

=== Unmade projects ===
Todd was the first choice of author Ian Fleming to play James Bond in Dr. No, but a scheduling conflict gave the role to Sean Connery. In the 1960s, Todd unsuccessfully attempted to produce a film of Ian Fleming's The Diamond Smugglers and a television series based on true accounts of the Queen's Messengers. He was also announced for a proposed film about William Shakespeare.

In his book British Film Character Actors (1982), Terence Pettigrew described Todd as "an actor who made the most of what he had, which could be summed up as an inability to sit still while there was a horse to leap astride, a swollen river to swim or a tree to vanish into."

== Personal life ==
Todd was married twice; both marriages ended in divorce. His first wife was actress Catherine Grant-Bogle, whom he met in Dundee Repertory. They were married from 1949 until 1970. They had a son, Peter (1952–2005), and a daughter, Fiona Margaret Todd born 1956. In 1960 he had a son Jeremy Todd-Nelson with model Patricia Nelson. He was married to model Virginia Mailer from 1970 until 1992; they had two sons together, Andrew then Seamus (1977–1997). In retirement, Todd lived in the village of Little Ponton and later in Little Humby, eight miles from Grantham, Lincolnshire.

Tragically, two of Todd's five children committed suicide using family firearms. On 7 December 1997, Todd's youngest son Seamus Palethorpe-Todd who was 20, shot himself in the head with a shotgun lying on his bed at their home in Lincolnshire while home on a break from Newcastle University where he was a first year student studying politics; an inquest determined that the suicide might have been a depressive reaction to the drug he was taking for severe acne. Eight years later on 21 September 2005, Todd's eldest son Peter, who was 53, also using a shotgun, killed himself in his car in East Malling, Kent, following marital difficulties. Peter had been suffering depression.

Todd bought a dairy farm in 1957 and Jersey cows to stock it along with hens and pigs. He sold a brand of his own cream to restaurants, shops and supermarkets across the Midlands and south of England.

He was an admirer of Margaret Thatcher and he dined with her at 10 Downing Street along with Ronald Reagan (with whom he had kept in touch since they made "The Hasty Heart" together.)

Todd was a supporter of Second World War commemoration events, particularly those associated with the Normandy landings and 617 Squadron RAF. He continued to be identified in the public consciousness with Guy Gibson from his portrayal of him in the 1950s film, and attended 617 Squadron anniversaries up to 2008. He narrated a television documentary about the Squadron, and contributed forewords to several books on the subject, including The Dam Buster Story (2003); Filming the Dam Busters (2005); and Bouncing-Bomb Man: The Science of Sir Barnes Wallis (2009).

=== Death ===
Todd died of cancer at his home near Grantham in Lincolnshire on 3 December 2009. His body was buried between his two sons Seamus and Peter at St. Guthlac's Church in Little Ponton in Lincolnshire. The gravestone's epitaph reads "Richard Andrew Palethorpe Todd, 1919–2009, husband of Virginia and Kitty, loving father of Peter, Fiona, Andrew, Seamus and Jeremy, Exit Dashing Young Blade" (a reference to the Queen Mother's description of him).

== Selected filmography ==
Year	Film	Role	Director	Notes
1937	Good Morning, Boys	Extra in crowd scene	Marcel Varnel	uncredited
1938	A Yank at Oxford	Extra in sporting event	Jack Conway	uncredited
1938	Old Bones of the River	Extra in crowd scene	Marcel Varnel	uncredited
1949	For Them That Trespass	Herbert Edward Logan	Alberto Cavalcanti	
1949	The Hasty Heart	Cpl. Lachlan "Lachie" MacLachlan	Vincent Sherman	
1949	The Interrupted Journey	John North	Daniel Birt	
1950	Stage Fright	Jonathan Cooper	Alfred Hitchcock	
1950	Portrait of Clare	Robert Hart	Lance Comfort	
1951	Flesh and Blood	Charles Cameron / Sutherland	Anthony Kimmins	
1951	Lightning Strikes Twice	Richard Trevelyan	King Vidor	
1952	The Story of Robin Hood and His Merrie Men	Robin Hood	Ken Annakin	
1952	24 Hours of a Woman's Life	The Young Man	Victor Saville	
1952	Venetian Bird	Edward Mercer	Ralph Thomas	
1952	Elstree Story	Narrator	Gilbert Gunn	
1953	The Sword and the Rose	Charles Brandon	Ken Annakin	
1954	Rob Roy: The Highland Rogue	Rob Roy MacGregor	Harold French	
1954	The Bed	Capitaine Davidson		
1955	A Man Called Peter	Peter Marshall	Henry Koster	biopic
1955	The Dam Busters	Wing Commander Guy Gibson, V.C, D.S.O., D.F.C.	Michael Anderson	
1955	The Virgin Queen	Sir Walter Raleigh	Henry Koster	
1956	Marie-Antoinette reine de France	Comte Axel von Fersen	Jean Delannoy	
1956	D-Day the Sixth of June	Lt. Col. John Wynter	Henry Koster	
1957	Yangtse Incident: The Story of H.M.S. Amethyst	John Kerans	Michael Anderson	
1957	Saint Joan	Jean de Dunois, Bastard of Orleans	Otto Preminger	
1958	Chase a Crooked Shadow	Ward Prescott	Michael Anderson	
1958	The Naked Earth	Danny	Vincent Sherman	
1958	Intent to Kill	Dr. Bob McLaurin	Jack Cardiff	
1959	Danger Within	Lt. Col. David Baird, M.C	Don Chaffey	
1960	Never Let Go	John Cummings	John Guillermin	
1961	The Long and the Short and the Tall	Sgt. Mitchem	Leslie Norman	
1961	Don't Bother to Knock	Bill Ferguson	Cyril Frankel	
1961	The Hellions	Sgt. Sam Hargis	Ken Annakin	
1962	Le Crime ne paie pas	Col. Roberts William	Gérard Oury	segment "L'homme de I'avenue"
1962	The Boys	Victor Webster	Sidney J. Furie	
1962	The Longest Day	John Howard		British Army officer
1963	The Very Edge	Geoffrey Lawrence	Cyril Frankel	
1963	Death Drums Along the River	Inspector Harry Sanders	Lawrence Huntington	
1964	Coast of Skeletons	Inspector Harry Sanders	Robert Lynn	
1965	Operation Crossbow	Wing Cmdr. Kendall	Michael Anderson	
1965	The Battle of the Villa Fiorita	Darrell	Delmer Daves	
1967	The Love-Ins	Dr. Jonathan Barnett	Arthur Dreifuss	
1968	Subterfuge	Col. Victor Redmayne	Peter Graham Scott	
1968	Last of the Long-haired Boys	Trigg		
1970	Dorian Gray	Basil Hallward	Massimo Dallamano	
1972	Asylum	Walter	Roy Ward Baker	segment "Frozen Fear"
1977	No. 1 of the Secret Service	Arthur Loveday	Lindsay Shonteff	
1978	The Big Sleep	Commander Barker	Michael Winner	
1979	Home Before Midnight	Geoffrey Steele	Pete Walker	
1979	Bloodbath	Terence	Silvio Narizzano	
1983	House of the Long Shadows	Sam Allyson	Pete Walker	
1992	Incident at Victoria Falls	Lord Roberts	Bill Corcoran	

=== Box-office rankings ===
British exhibitors regularly listed Todd among the most popular local stars at the box office in various polls:

- 1950 – 7th most popular British star
- 1952 – 5th most popular British star in Britain
- 1954 – 9th most popular British star
- 1955 – 7th most popular British star
- 1957 – 3rd most popular star in Britain

== Select theatre credits ==
- An Ideal Husband by Oscar Wilde (1965) – Strand Theatre, London with Margaret Lockwood, Michael Denison, Dulcie Gray and Roger Livesey – also toured South Africa
- Dear Octopus by Dodie Smith (1967) – Haymarket Theatre, London
- "The Winslow Boy" (1971) – national tour with Patrick Barr, Elizabeth Sellars and David Nicholas Wilkinson
- " A Christmas Carol" (1971–72) – Theatre Royal, Brighton with Patrick Barr, Elizabeth Sellars, Mervyn Johns and David Nicholas Wilkinson
- Sleuth (1972–73) – Australian tour
- Equus (1975) – Australian tour
- The Business of Murder (1983–91) – Mayfair Theatre, London

== Books ==
- Caught in the Act London: Hutchinson ISBN 0091638003 (1986)
- In Camera, an Autobiography Continued London: Hutchinson ISBN 0091735343 (1989)

== See also ==
- List of British actors
- List of Academy Award winners and nominees from Great Britain
