= Tom Macaulay =

British actor (1906–1979)

- Macaulay in the 1950s
- Born: Chambré Thomas MacAulay Booth; March 17, 1906; Liverpool, United Kingdom
- Died: June 19, 1979 (aged 73); London, United Kingdom
- Occupation: Actor
- Spouse: Tucker McGuire

Tom Macaulay (17 March 1906 – 19 June 1979) was a British actor. Born Chambré Thomas MacAulay Booth, and Harrow educated, he was married to the actress Tucker McGuire.

== Selected filmography ==
- I See a Dark Stranger (1946) - Lieut. Spanswick
- The Chiltern Hundreds (1949) - Cleghorn
- The Woman in Question (1950) - Flashy Man (uncredited)
- The Long Dark Hall (1951) - Ironworks manager
- Mother Riley Meets the Vampire (1952) - Robot Mark 1
- Penny Princess (1952) - Grieves (uncredited)
- The Planter's Wife (1952) - Jack Bushell
- Murder at Scotland Yard (1953) - Insp. Grant
- Skid Kids (1953) - (uncredited)
