= The Interrupted Journey =

1949 film by Daniel Birt

- Theatrical release poster
- Directed by: Daniel Birt
- Written by: Michael Pertwee
- Produced by: Anthony Havelock-Allan
- Starring: Richard Todd; Valerie Hobson; Christine Norden; Tom Walls
- Cinematography: Erwin Hillier
- Edited by: Danny Chorlton
- Music by: Stanley Black
- Production company: Valiant Films
- Distributed by: British Lion Film Corporation
- Release date: 12 October 1949
- Running time: 80 minutes
- Country: United Kingdom
- Language: English
- Budget: £96,700
- Box office: £126,179 (UK)

The Interrupted Journey is a 1949 British thriller film directed by Daniel Birt and starring Valerie Hobson, Richard Todd, Christine Norden and Tom Walls. It was written by Michael Pertwee.

== Plot ==
John North, a struggling writer, plans to elope with his married mistress, Susan Wilding, following a quarrel with his wife Carol who is frustrated that her husband refuses employment offered by her father, pointing out they cannot pay bills, and will soon lose their house. She suggests he take the job and write in his spare time until he is established, a thing he refuses even to consider. After meeting Susan in London, he suspects they are being followed, though Susan is dismissive of his concerns. Once they are on the train, he cannot rid himself of his unease. John is guilt-ridden while recollecting the quarrel and feels affection for his wife. Seeing Susan is asleep, he goes out into the corridor, and again thinks he sees the man he believes has been following them. John hears a ticket inspector mention that the train is approaching a point on the line which is close to his house. John thinks he sees Susan's husband further along the corridor, and panics and pulls the emergency communication cord to stop the train. As the train stops, he passes the still-sleeping Susan and jumps off the train and makes for his house. He tells his wife he has decided to take the job with her father's company and they embrace.

Suddenly, they hear the sound of a train crash nearby. Carol runs to help the victims, while John is stunned as he realises it involves the train he has just left. He walks alongside the wreckage and in a shattered carriage sees a lifeless arm that clearly belongs to his mistress. She and many others in the carriage have been killed in the collision. John says nothing about his presence on the train to his wife, maintaining that he returned from London by bus.

In the next day's newspaper, John reads the details of the crash: after he had pulled the cord and the train had stopped, it had been struck by another train, with twenty dead and others injured. Mr Clayton, a British Railways crash inspector, arrives, and questions John, telling him that they had recovered a document connecting John and Susan. It was found on the man who had been following them, a private detective hired by her husband, both of whom had been identified as among the dead in the crash. However, Carol points out that initials used in the notes could also refer to Susan's husband.

Eventually, John admits to his wife that he was on the train and had been running away with another woman, but had pulled the cord and jumped off after changing his mind. When she says she will stand by him, he determines to confess to Clayton, but hears on the radio that the crash was caused by a failed signal rather than his pulling the cord. They still go to tell Clayton, who says that he will not do anything more about John's actions.

However, the next day Clayton arrives at the house with Police Inspector Waterson. It has been discovered that, before the train crash, Mrs Wilding had been shot through the heart. Waterson says they suspect that John killed her and then jumped off the train. John denies it, but that evening the police recover a revolver from his garden pond.

Fearing he could be hanged for a crime he did not commit, John visits the Wildings' house in London, suspecting that Mr Wilding is still alive; however, Wilding's mother tells him that she identified her son's body. John then goes to the hotel in Plymouth where he had planned to stay with Susan. He finds Wilding there, who tells him that he was on the train, murdered his wife for being unfaithful, and planted his identifying papers on one of the dead. The two men fight and Wilding shoots John in the head.

John finds himself back on the train, apparently recovering from a panic attack in the corridor. Instead of pulling the cord, John returns to Susan and expresses his doubts about what they are doing. This time, she pulls the cord and tells him to go back to his wife. He jumps from the train and arrives at his house, and he and his wife embrace. He hears the sound of a train whistle, but it is just the stopped train moving off again.

== Cast ==
- Valerie Hobson as Carol North
- Richard Todd as John North
- Christine Norden as Susan Wilding
- Tom Walls as Mr Clayton
- Ralph Truman as Inspector Waterson
- Vida Hope as Miss Marchment, owner of Danver's hotel
- Alexander Gauge as Jerves Wilding
- Dora Bryan as waitress at station buffet
- Arnold Ridley as Mr Saunders
- Cyril Smith as George, the barman
- Arthur Lane as Constable Cowley
- Nigel Neilson as Sergeant Sanger
- Dora Sevening as Wilding's mother
- Elsie Wagstaff as Wilding's maid
- Alan Gordon as ticket inspector
- Vincent Ball as 1st rescue worker at crash site
- Jack Vyvyan as 2nd rescue worker at crash site
- Roger Moore as soldier in Paddington café
- Gwynneth Vaughan as girl with the soldier

== Production ==
Tony Havelock-Allen was running a production company, Constellation Films. Daniel Birt was an editor who wanted to direct and brought Interrupted Journey to the company. Havelock-Allen was married to Valerie Hobson at the time and he also felt the film might make a good vehicle for Richard Todd who had just become a star with The Hasty Heart. The producer later recalled:

I didn't think much of the project, but if you have a company you have to do something, because the money keeps on going out. It had no success at all, however. Daniel Birt was obviously not going to be a great director; editors can always make films but only the very talented ones can make good films.

The film was originally known as The Cord. Todd was borrowed from Associated British Pictures.

To help accurately portray officers of the Plymouth City Police, Havelock-Allan wrote to the Chief Constable, Mr J.F. Skittery, asking for advice on the design of police uniforms. Skittery responded by compiling a small hand-written book containing photographs of clothing, helmets, badges and equipment, and enclosed enough helmet badges, collar badges and buttons to supply all of the cast in the film who would be portraying Plymouth City Police officers.

The railway scenes were shot at Longmoor in Hampshire. The film includes a train crash occurring after someone pulls the emergency cord, as had happened in the Winsford train crash the previous year.

== Reception ==
=== Box office ===
The producer's share of receipts were £107,000.

=== Critical ===
The Monthly Film Bulletin wrote: "The standard of playing in a small cast is adequate, though Richard Todd's technique would be more suited to the theatre. The most remarkable elements in the film are the camerawork and lighting, on which the director, Daniel Birt, must have concentrated his attentions. Striking use of the camera is especially noticeable in a scene in the hall of a small hotel, where an amusing cameo by Vida Hope is played against a background of innumerable soft highlights and intense shadows, which lend a fine sense of depth and atmosphere. These qualities though they have not produced a really successful film, augur well for any future collaboration by the same team."

Kine Weekly wrote: "The first half is fairly plausible and exciting, despite Richard Todd's immature acting, but the second is too fantastic for words. Most audiences will feel that they've been cheated when the film turns out to be a dream."

Variety wrote: "The theme allows for good meaty action and crisp direction has kept the story moving at a steady pace. There is a neat surprise twist in the ending, which lifts the subject out of the rut of standard thrillers. A reasonable thesping standard is maintained and this is particularly good in the smaller parts. Todd is solid and resourceful as the writer and chalks up another first-rate performance. Valerie Hobson gives a clearcut interpretation of the role of his long-suffering, understanding wife."

The Encyclopedia of Film Noir describes it as a "superior film noir" and compares its ending to The Woman in the Window (1944).

The film's ending is sometimes considered by critics to be contrived, as Todd realises that much of the plot has been a nightmare and awakens from this dream sequence shortly before the conclusion for a happy ending. However, it has been noted that the whole film "simulates the qualities of a nightmare" through its use of coincidences and the lighting.
