= The Curse of the Wraydons =

1946 British film by Victor M. Gover

- Directed by: Victor M. Gover
- Written by: Owen George; Maurice Sandoz (play); W. G. Willis (play)
- Produced by: Gilbert Church; J. C. Jones
- Starring: Tod Slaughter; Bruce Seton; Henry Caine; Pearl Cameron
- Cinematography: S.D. Onions
- Edited by: Victor M. Gover
- Music by: De Wolfe Music
- Production company: Bushey Studios
- Distributed by: Ambassador Film Productions
- Release date: 19 December 1946
- Running time: 94 mins
- Country: United Kingdom
- Language: English

The Curse of the Wraydons (U.S. title: Strangler's Morgue) is a 1946 British thriller film directed by Victor M. Gover and starring Tod Slaughter, Bruce Seton and Henry Caine. It was written by Owen George based on the 1928 play Spring-Heeled Jack by Maurice Sandoz, which was in turn based upon the 1849 play by W. G. Willis. It was made at Bushey Studios.

== Plot ==
During the Napoleonic Wars an Englishman, Philip Wraydon, is sent into exile in a French insane asylum to avoid being hanged for the murder of his brothers wife, to whom he had made rejected advances. He agrees to become a spy for France, and returns to England to murder or frame for murder the remaining members of his family so that he can inherit the family fortune.

It does not feature the legendary Victorian character Spring-heeled Jack;the name is used in the film simply as a nickname for Philip's nephew Jack Wraydon, who is athletic and able to leap long distances, although this barely features in the plot.

== Cast ==
- Tod Slaughter as Philip Wraydon
- Bruce Seton as Jack Wraydon, Spring Heeled Jack
- Henry Caine as George Wraydon
- Pearl Cameron as Rose Wraydon
- Andrew Laurence as George Heeningham
- Alan Lawrance as Squire Sedgefield
- Lorraine Clewes as Helen Sedgefield
- Gabriel Toyne as Payne
- Ben Williams as John Rickers
- John Coyle as Dennis
- Daphne Arthur as Alice Maitland
- Barry O'Neill as George Wraydon

== Release ==
The film was released in the USA by Hoffberg Productions Inc. in 1953, edited to 75 minutes and retitled Strangler's Morgue, on a double bill with The Greed of William Hart (1948), retitled as Horror Maniacs.

In 1950 the BBC produced a TV version starring and produced by Slaughter, titled Spring-Heeled Jack.

== Reception ==
The Monthly Film Bulletin wrote: "Slow, to the extent of being irritating, the film fails miserably as a melodrama except in the traditional over-acting. There are moments, however, especially in the closing sequences, which make laughter irrepressible."

Kine Weekly wrote: "It is treated with apparent seriousness, but fails through its inability fully to exploit Tod Slaughter's exuberant histrionics. It needs drastic sharpening up. Stunt offering mainly for the sticks."

Picturegoer wrote: "Tod Slaughter has not managed to breathe much life into the old bones of the Lyceum melodrama "SpringHeeled Jack – Terror of London.'" ... The picture is played straight and opens too slowly. The latter half is in better Tod Slaughter tradition."

In British Sound Films: The Studio Years 1928–1959 David Quinlan rated the film as "poor", writing: "Lurid horror-thriller is much too long and slow."
