= The Secret Tent =

1956 British film by Don Chaffey

- Andrée Melly and Donald Gray
- Directed by: Don Chaffey
- Written by: Jan Read
- Based on: the play The Secret Tent by Elizabeth Addyman
- Starring: Donald Gray
- Cinematography: Harry Waxman
- Production company: Forward Films
- Release date: February 1956
- Running time: 69 minutes
- Country: United Kingdom
- Language: English

The Secret Tent is a 1956 British crime film directed by Don Chaffey and starring Donald Gray and Andrée Melly. It was written by Jan Read based on the play of the same title by Elizabeth Addyman.

== Plot ==
Respectable wife Ruth Martyn attempts to conceal her secret past as a criminal from neighbours and from her husband Chris. However, when a neighbour is burgled and Ruth mysteriously disappears, she becomes the police's prime suspect. Husband Chris searches the city for Ruth, in hopes of proving her innocence.

== Cast ==
- Donald Gray as Chris Martyn
- Andrée Melly as Ruth Martyn
- Jean Anderson as Mrs. Martyn
- Sonia Dresdel as Miss Mitchum-Browne
- Andrew Cruickshank as Inspector Thornton
- Dinah Ann Rogers as Sally
- Peter Hammond as Smith
- Conrad Phillips as Sergeant
- Gareth Tandy as Philip

== Production ==
It was made at Shepperton Studios.

== Critical reception ==
The Monthly Film Bulletin wrote: "With a far-fetched and tasteless story, strenuously but inexpertly played out, this emotional melodrama has little to recommend it."

Kine Weekly wrote: "The principal players do their best to put some conviction into the plot, but fail to achieve the impossible. The picture's much too theatrical to grip, let alone touch, the emotions. ... The picture attempts to bind Peg's Paper between Police Gazette boards, but the experiment's a flop. Jean Anderson puts up a bold show as Mrs. Martyn, Andrew Cruikshank impresses as a fair-minded cop, Sonia Dresdel amuses as a gossiping spinster, and Donald Gray and Andrée Melly struggle hard to make sense of their parts as Chris and Ruth, but untidy direction, plus a loose, turgid script, beats them in the end. Novelettish dialogue and cheap settings are additional handicaps. TV can do better than this."

Picturegoer wrote: "Andrée Melly, as a reformed 'bad girl,' is forced to become the accomplice of crooks and has to flee from her adoring husband and children. Novelettish? Maybe, but this modern melodrama is put across with a flair. It's a tightly knit story, with sincere sentiment and some excitement. Those favourites of the TV screen, Andrée Melly and Donald Gray (the husband) are convincing, but are bettered by those excellent actresses, Jean Anderson and Sonia Dresdel."

Picture Show wrote: "Strong domestic drama. ... Well acted."

The Daily Film Renter wrote: "Strong, dramatic situations with a touch of mystery and crime; good performances. ... This story builds one strong dramaticsituation on top of another, with relief supplied by Sonia Dresdel as a gossiping neighbour. ... Sound performances and technical values throughout hold the interest and will prove reliable entertainment for general audiences."

In British Sound Films: The Studio Years 1928–1959 David Quinlan rated the film as "mediocre", writing: "Popular TV favourites star, but melodrama is just another 'B'."

Sky Movies wrote, "Talented director Don Chaffey, who later made The Man Upstairs, Jason and the Argonauts and A Jolly Bad Fellow treats novelettish material with some flair in this story of a former 'bad girl' whose past threatens her present happiness."
