= Don Chaffey =

British film director, writer, producer, and art director (1917–1990)

- Chaffey c. 1965
- Born: Donald Chaffey; 5 August 1917; Hastings, Sussex, England
- Died: 13 November 1990 (aged 73); Kawau Island, New Zealand
- Occupations: Film director; writer; film producer; art director
- Years active: 1948–1990
- Spouses: Edna Judd Chaffey (m. 1940; died 1981) Paula Kelly (m. 1985)
- Children: 1

Donald Chaffey (5 August 1917 – 13 November 1990) was a British film director, writer, producer, and art director.

Chaffey's film career began as an art director in 1947, and his directorial debut was in 1953. He remained active in the industry until his death in 1990 from heart failure. His film Charley One-Eye (1973) was entered into the 24th Berlin International Film Festival.

He is chiefly remembered for his fantasy films, which include Jason and the Argonauts (1963), The Three Lives of Thomasina (1963), One Million Years B.C. (1966), The Viking Queen (1967), Creatures the World Forgot (1971), Pete's Dragon (1977), and C.H.O.M.P.S. (1979), his final feature film.

Concurrent with his theatrically released films, Chaffey directed episodes of numerous British television series, including multiple installments of Danger Man, The Prisoner, and The Avengers. From the 1980s until his death, all of his work was in American made-for-TV movies, and in such TV series as Fantasy Island, Stingray, MacGyver, Vega$, T. J. Hooker, Matt Houston, and Charlie's Angels.

== Career ==
Chaffey began his career in the art department of Gainsborough Pictures where he worked as a draftsman on Madonna of the Seven Moons (1945), The Rake's Progress (1945), and Caravan (1946). He was art director of The Adventures of Dusty Bates (1947) and The Little Ballerina (1948). He directed the documentary shorts Thames Tideway (1948) and Cape Cargoes (1948).

Chaffey directed the short features The Mysterious Poacher (1950) and The Case of the Missing Scene (1950). He returned to the art department for King of the Underworld (1950), The Stolen Plans (1952), Murder at the Grange (1952), Murder at Scotland Yard (1952), and Black 13 (1953).

=== Director ===
Chaffey resumed his directing career with the family film Skid Kids (1953). He made the short Watch Out (1953), then did Strange Stories (1953), Bouncer Breaks Up (1953, a short), The Mask (1952), and A Good Pull Up (1953).

Chaffey directed Time Is My Enemy (1954). After the short Dead on Time (1955) he made The Secret Tent (1956), The Flesh Is Weak (1957) and The Girl in the Picture (1957).

He directed episodes of TV series like Theatre Royal, The Adventures of the Big Man, Chevron Hall of Stars, The Errol Flynn Theatre, Assignment Foreign Legion, The Adventures of Robin Hood, Dial 999, and The New Adventures of Charlie Chan. He interspersed these with features like A Question of Adultery (1958), The Man Upstairs (1958), Danger Within (1959), Dentist in the Chair (1960), Lies My Father Told Me (1960), and Nearly a Nasty Accident (1961).

=== Disney and fantasy ===
He directed Greyfriars Bobby: The True Story of a Dog (1961), then A Matter of WHO (1961), a version of The Prince and the Pauper (1962) for Disney, and The Webster Boy (1962).

He had a big hit with Jason and the Argonauts (1963) with Ray Harryhausen. Then it was back to Disney for The Three Lives of Thomasina (1963).

Chaffey directed They All Died Laughing (1964), The Crooked Road (1965), and One Million Years B.C. (1966) for Hammer. He returned to television to do episodes of Danger Man, The Baron, The Prisoner, Man in a Suitcase, Journey to the Unknown, The Avengers, The Pathfinders, and The Protectors.

Chaffey did The Viking Queen (1967) for Hammer, A Twist of Sand (1968), Creatures the World Forgot (1971) for Hammer, Clinic Exclusive (1973), Charley-One-Eye (1973), and Persecution (1974).

=== Australia and US TV ===
Chaffey went to Australia where he directed Ben Hall (1975), Ride a Wild Pony (1975), The Fourth Wish (1976), and Shimmering Light (1978).

He worked in America too making CHiPs, Pete's Dragon (1977) for Disney, The Magic of Lassie (1978), Lassie: A New Beginning (1978), The Gift of Love (1978), C.H.O.M.P.S. (1979), and Casino (1980).

He eventually focused almost exclusively on episodic TV: Vega$, Charlie's Angels, Strike Force, Fantasy Island, Gavilan, The Renegade, Lottery!, Hotel, Matt Houston, Finder of Lost Loves, International Airport (1985, a pilot), Spenser: For Hire, Hollywood Beat, Airwolf, Hunter, Outlaws, MacGyver, Stingray and Mission: Impossible.

== Personal life ==
Don Chaffey was married to Edna Chaffey for 40 years until she died in 1981 of cancer. Together they had one daughter, Nicolette Chaffey.

He then married American actress Paula Kelly in 1985. Chaffey died of a heart attack in 1990 in a house he owned in New Zealand.

== Filmography ==
=== Film ===
- 1953: Strange Stories ("Strange Journey" segment)
- 1953: Skid Kids
- 1954: Time Is My Enemy
- 1956: The Secret Tent
- 1957: The Girl in the Picture
- 1957: The Flesh Is Weak
- 1958: A Question of Adultery
- 1958: The Man Upstairs
- 1959: Danger Within
- 1960: Lies My Father Told Me
- 1960: Dentist in the Chair
- 1961: Nearly a Nasty Accident
- 1961: Greyfriars Bobby
- 1961: A Matter of WHO
- 1962 The Prince and the Pauper
- 1962: The Webster Boy
- 1963: Jason and the Argonauts
- 1963: The Three Lives of Thomasina
- 1964: A Jolly Bad Fellow
- 1965: The Crooked Road
- 1966: One Million Years B.C.
- 1967: The Viking Queen
- 1968: A Twist of Sand
- 1971: Clinic Exclusive
- 1971: Creatures the World Forgot
- 1973: Charley One-Eye
- 1974: Persecution
- 1975: Ride a Wild Pony
- 1976: The Fourth Wish
- 1977: Born to Run
- 1977: Pete's Dragon
- 1978: The Magic of Lassie
- 1979: C.H.O.M.P.S. (final theatrical film)

=== Television ===
- 1955–56: Theatre Royal (TV series; 16 episodes)
- 1956: The Adventures of the Big Man (TV series; 2 episodes)
- 1956: Chevron Hall of Stars (TV series; 1 episode)
- 1956–57: Assignment Foreign Legion (TV series; 7 episodes)
- 1957: The Errol Flynn Theatre (TV series; 2 episodes)
- 1957–58: The New Adventures of Charlie Chan (TV series; 13 episodes)
- 1957–58: The Adventures of Robin Hood (TV series; 7 episodes)
- 1959–60: The Four Just Men (TV series; 13 episodes)
- 1959: Dial 999 (TV series; 1 episode)
- 1962–65: Walt Disney's Wonderful World of Color (TV series; 10 episodes)
- 1964–66: Danger Man (TV series; 15 episodes)
- 1966–67: The Baron (TV series; 2 episodes)
- 1967: The Prisoner (TV series; 4 episodes)
- 1968: Man in a Suitcase (TV series; 1 episode)
- 1968–69: Journey to the Unknown (TV series; 2 episodes)
- 1968–69: The Avengers (TV series; 5 episodes)
- 1970: Journey to the Unknown (TV movie; "The Last Visitor" segment)
- 1972: Pathfinders (TV series; 2 episodes)
- 1972–73: The Protectors (TV series; 9 episodes)
- 1975: Ben Hall (TV series; 1 episode)
- 1977: CHiPs (TV series; 1 episode)
- 1978–81: Vega$ (TV series; 17 episodes)
- 1978–81: Charlie's Angels (TV series; 10 episodes)
- 1978: Lassie: A New Beginning (TV movie)
- 1978: The Gift of Love (TV movie)
- 1978: Shimmering Light (TV movie)
- 1979: The Wonderful World of Disney (TV series; 4 episodes)
- 1980: Casino (TV movie)
- 1980: Riding for the Pony Express (TV pilot episode)
- 1981–82: Fantasy Island (TV series; 7 episodes)
- 1982: Strike Force (TV series; 4 episodes)
- 1982: Gavilan (TV series; 1 episode)
- 1982–83: T. J. Hooker (TV series; 6 episodes)
- 1982–84: Matt Houston (TV series; 12 episodes)
- 1983: The Renegades (TV series; 1 episode)
- 1983: Lottery! (TV series; 1 episode)
- 1983: Hotel (TV series; 2 episodes)
- 1984–85: Finder of Lost Loves (TV series; 6 episodes)
- 1985: Hollywood Beat (TV series; 4 episodes)
- 1985: International Airport (TV movie)
- 1985: Spenser: For Hire (TV series; 1 episode)
- 1986: Airwolf (TV series; 1 episode)
- 1986: Hunter (TV series; 1 episode)
- 1986–87: MacGyver (TV series; 2 episodes)
- 1987: Outlaws (TV series; 1 episode)
- 1987: Stingray (TV series; 2 episodes)
- 1989: Mission: Impossible (TV series; 4 episodes)
