= The Angel with the Trumpet =

The Angel with the Trumpet may refer to:

- The Angel with the Trumpet (1948 film), Austrian
- The Angel with the Trumpet (1950 film), British
