= The Dog and the Diamonds =

1953 British family drama film by Ralph Thomas

- Opening titles
- Directed by: Ralph Thomas
- Written by: Patricia Latham
- Starring: Kathleen Harrison
- Production company: Peter Rogers Productions
- Distributed by: Children's Film Foundation
- Release date: November 1953
- Running time: 54 mins
- Country: United Kingdom
- Language: English

The Dog and the Diamonds is a 1953 British family drama film directed by Ralph Thomas and starring Kathleen Harrison, George Coulouris, and Geoffrey Sumner. The screenplay was by Patricia Latham. It was produced by Peter Rogers and distributed by the Children's Film Foundation.

== Plot ==
A group of children are forbidden to keep pets in their accommodation, so decide to open their own zoo in the gardens of a nearby empty house. They soon discover that the house is the headquarters of a gang of jewel thieves.

== Cast ==
- Kathleen Harrison as Mrs Fossett
- George Coulouris as Forbes
- Geoffrey Sumner as Mr Gayford
- Brian Oulton as Mr Plumpton
- Michael Maguire as Jimmy
- Robert Sandford as Peter
- Robert Scroggins as Ginger
- Barbara Brown as Helen
- Molly Osborne as Linda
- Hal Osmond as crook
- Arthur Lane as crook
- Dennis Wyndham as crook
- Boffin as the dog

== Reception ==
The Monthly Film Bulletin wrote: "The film follows the well-tried pattern of children’s films, with children and animals playing the leading roles, supported by adults, good and bad. There is a chase and a well-devised happy ending. Kathleen Harrison plays the owner of a pet-shop in her best Huggett vein; George Coulouris is the ill-tempered caretaker, allowed one moment of tenderness (towards a baby in a pram) but otherwise symbolising the tyrannies of an unbending adult authority. The three crooks are inoffensive villains, fulfilling the familiar but difficult task of supplying dramatic tension without making villainy frightening or crime attractive. Although the fooling is of uneven quality, the film is good light-hearted entertainment."

Kine Weekly wrote: "The leading adult rôles are played by Kathleen Harrison, delightfully amusing as the owner of a pets' stores, and George Coulouris as the caretaker who wages war on pets. The picture, which is full of action and has many good comedy scenes, teaches by inference the love of animals and a sense of civic responsibility. The story is well told, and the fast-moving action provides plenty of excitement, laughs and suspense."

== Accolades ==
The film won the "Best Long Entertainment Film for Children from 8 to 11 years" award at the Fifth International Festival of Films for Children at Venice, in August 1953.
