= Nigel Neilson =

British television and film actor (1919–2000)

Nigel Neilson as Hubert in Time Is My Enemy (1952)

Nigel Fraser Neilson (12 December 1919 – 3 June 2000) was a British television and film actor of the 1940s and 50s.

Neilson was born in Aldershot in Hampshire in 1919. In 1925 aged 5 he moved to New Zealand but returned to the UK in 1929 with his mother and brother.

During World War II he served as a lieutenant in the Royal Armoured Corps in the Middle East in Egypt and Libya, where he was awarded the Military Cross in 1942. He is known for his appearances in the television series The Handle Bar (1947), Old Songs for New (1948), How Do You View? (1950) and Drawing-Room Detective (1950).

His film roles include The Interrupted Journey (1949), Stranger at My Door (1950), The Story of Robin Hood and His Merrie Men (1952), Wings of Danger (1952), The Angel with the Trumpet (1950) and Time Is My Enemy (1952).

He married Pamela Catherine Georgina Sheppard in 1949 and died at Hastings in Sussex in 2000 aged 80.

== Filmography ==
Year	Title	Role	Notes
1949	The Interrupted Journey	Sergeant Sanger	
1950	The Angel with the Trumpet	Nazi	
1950	Stranger at My Door	Ballard Singer	Uncredited
1952	The Story of Robin Hood and His Merrie Men	Merrie Man #6	
1952	Wings of Danger	Duty Officer	Uncredited
1952	Time Is My Enemy	Hubert	(final film role)
