= King of the Underworld (1952 film) =

1952 British film by Victor M. Gover

- Frame from the film
- Directed by: Victor M. Gover
- Written by: John Gilling
- Produced by: Gilbert Church
- Starring: Tod Slaughter; Patrick Barr; Tucker McGuire
- Edited by: Helen Wiggins
- Music by: William Trytel
- Production company: Gilbert Church Productions
- Distributed by: Ambassador Film Productions
- Release date: July 1952
- Running time: 82 minutes
- Country: United Kingdom
- Language: English

King of the Underworld is a 1952 British crime film directed by Victor M. Gover and starring Tod Slaughter, Patrick Barr and Tucker McGuire. It was written by John Gilling, and was followed by a sequel Murder at Scotland Yard (1953).

== Preservation status ==
The British Film Institute National Archive holds a collection of stills but no film or video materials.

== Plot ==
A master criminal is hunted by the police after committing a series of crimes.

== Cast ==
- Tod Slaughter as Terence Reilly
- Patrick Barr as Inspector Morley
- Tucker McGuire as Eileen Trotter
- Ingeborg von Kusserow as Marie
- Frank Hawkins as Inspector Cranshaw
- Leonard Sharp as Mullins
- Anne Valery as Susan

== Production ==
The film was made at Bushey Studios with sets designed by the art director Don Chaffey.

== Critical reception ==
Kine Weekly wrote: "The picture is tongue-in-the-cheek stuff ... 'Sweeny Tod' Slaughter delivers every menacing line with obvious relish and is both amusing and effectively sinister as Riley, and the rest keep in step. King of the Underworld should be a crowning success with avid readers of penny dreadfuls."

In British Sound Films: The Studio Years 1928–1959 David Quinlan rated the film as "mediocre", writing: "Slight change of pace for barnstorming star, but film not widely shown."
