= Coast of Skeletons =

1965 British/South African/German film by Robert Lynn

- US poster from 1965
- Directed by: Robert Lynn
- Screenplay by: Anthony Scott Veitch
- Story by: Harry Alan Towers
- Based on: Sanders of the River by Edgar Wallace
- Produced by: Harry Alan Towers
- Starring: Richard Todd; Dale Robertson; Heinz Drache; Marianne Koch
- Cinematography: Stephen Dade
- Edited by: John Trumper
- Music by: Christopher Whelen
- Production companies: Towers of London Films; S.A. Film Studios
- Distributed by: Towers of London
- Release dates: 19 March 1965 (South Africa); 23 August 1965 (UK)
- Running time: 91 min.
- Countries: United Kingdom; South Africa; West Germany
- Language: English

Coast of Skeletons is a 1965 adventure film, directed by Robert Lynn and starring Richard Todd and Dale Robertson. It is a sequel to the 1963 film Death Drums Along the River, and just as that film, it uses the characters from Edgar Wallace's 1911 novel Sanders of the River and Zoltán Korda's 1935 film based on the novel, but placed in a totally different story. Coast of Skeletons was released in Germany as Sanders und das Schiff des Todes/ Sanders and the Ship of Death.

== Plot ==
Following independence, the unnamed British colony where Commissioner Harry Sanders has been working for many years sacks its British police force. So Sanders returns to London, where he soon finds work for an insurance company, which wants him to oversee a project to dredge for diamonds in the shallow waters off South West Africa.

Sanders soon finds himself drawn into a web of insurance fraud, a secret hunt for World War II gold bullion, and a rivalrous love triangle between a flamboyant American diamond prospector, a former German U-boat commander in the employ of the American, and the German's very young wife.

== Main cast ==
- Richard Todd as Commissioner Harry Sanders
- Dale Robertson as A.J. Magnus
- Heinz Drache as Janny von Koltze
- Marianne Koch as Helga
- Elga Andersen as Elisabeth von Koltze
- Derek Nimmo as Tom Hamilton
- Gabriel Bayman as Charlie Singer
- George Leech as Carlo Seton
- Gordon Mulholland as Mr. Spyker
- Josh du Toit as Hajo Petersen
- Dietmar Schönherr as Piet van Houten

== Production ==
Richard Todd says he agreed to make the film if paid more than he was in Death Drums Along the River and if the script - originally written by Towers - was rewritten by Tony Veitch. He says financing for the film briefly fell over prior to production but that Towers found the money. Shooting took place in South Africa in the Durban area. Todd called the film "a straightforward cops-and-robbers story involving diamond smuggling and various other illegal activities; a journeyman subject that would gain interest from the locations where we would be filming."
