= The Girl in the Picture (1957 film) =

1957 British film by Don Chaffey

- Opening title
- Directed by: Don Chaffey
- Written by: Paul Ryder
- Produced by: Ted Lloyd
- Starring: Donald Houston
- Cinematography: Ian Struthers
- Edited by: David C. Withers
- Production company: Cresswell Productions
- Distributed by: Eros Films
- Release date: January 1957
- Running time: 63 minutes
- Country: United Kingdom
- Language: English

The Girl in the Picture is a 1957 British second feature crime film directed by Don Chaffey and starring Donald Houston and Patrick Holt. It was written by Paul Ryder.

== Plot ==
A photograph submitted to a newspaper for a competition attracts the attention of crime reporter Jon Deering. It shows the getaway car used in a robbery which led to the unsolved murder of a policeman, and a glamorous woman waving to the car's driver. Deering undertakes to find the woman, believing she may hold the key to the killer's identity. However, the murderer is also alerted and attempts to silence the girl in the picture.

== Cast ==
- Donald Houston as Jon Deering
- Patrick Holt as Inspector Bliss
- Junia Crawford as Pat Dryden
- Maurice Kaufmann as Rod Mulloy
- Paddy Joyce as Jack Bates
- Tom Chatto as George Keefe
- John Paul as Detective Sergeant Nixon
- John Miller as Duncan
- Colin Cleminson as Stanley Eames
- Stuart Saunders as newspaper editor
- Bee Duffell as Mrs Stokes
- James Booth as office boy (credited as David Greeves)
- John Watson as policeman
- Lucette Marimar as model

== Critical reception ==
Monthly Film Bulletin said "Though in genre, format and content this second-feature crime thriller is conventional, there is a brightness about both the script and performance which raises it a little above the average of its kind."

Kine Weekly said "Handy-sized thriller, set in London. It concerns a crime reporter who solves a mysterious murder and prevents the culprit from committing flm another. There is nothing subtle about its plot, but its leading players, happily blessed with a sense of humour, manage to hold the interest and put a kick into its in-the-nick-of-time climax."

In British Sound Films: The Studio Years 1928–1959 David Quinlan rated the film as "average", writing: "Straightforward, old-hat crime stuff, but brightly pushed along."

TV Guide called the film "Enjoyable but familiar," and rated it 2/5 stars.

The Radio Times Guide to Films gave the film 2/5 stars, writing: "Probably best known for his work at Disney in the 1960s, director Don Chaffey was still cutting his teeth on British B-movies when he completed this lacklustre thriller. ... As mysteries go, this is on the elementary side."
