= Time Is My Enemy =

1954 British film by Don Chaffey

- U.S. poster
- Directed by: Don Chaffey
- Written by: Allan MacKinnon
- Based on: the play Second Chance by Ella Adkins
- Produced by: Roger Proudlock
- Starring: Dennis Price; Renée Asherson; Patrick Barr
- Cinematography: Geoffrey Faithfull
- Edited by: Sam Simmonds
- Production company: Vandyke Productions
- Distributed by: Independent Film Distributors
- Release date: 11 October 1954
- Running time: 64 minutes
- Country: United Kingdom
- Language: English

Time Is My Enemy is a 1954 British crime film directed by Don Chaffey and starring Dennis Price, Renée Asherson and Patrick Barr.

== Plot ==
Small-time crook Radley returns after a long absence to discover his wife Barbara has remarried, believing him killed in the Blitz. Finding her happily married to wealthy publisher John Everton, Radley begins blackmailing Barbara for £500 to keep their previous marriage quiet. When Radley kills a jeweller in a robbery, he is blackmailed by his roommate, so in turn threatens to also blackmail John Everton for £500. When she arrives at Radley's flat to pay the final instalment, he provokes her into shooting him. After surrendering herself to the police, Barbara discovers that all is not as it seems, Radley is wanted for more than one murder; and the police begin to question whether Radley is really dead after all.

== Cast ==
- Dennis Price as Martin Radley
- Renée Asherson as Barbara Everton
- Patrick Barr as John Everton
- Duncan Lamont as Inspector Charles Wayne
- Susan Shaw as Evelyn Gower
- Bonar Colleano as Harry Bond
- Alfie Bass as Ernie Gordon
- Agnes Lauchlan as Aunt Laura
- Brenda Hogan as Diana
- Barbara Grayley as Betty the maid
- Mavis Villiers as Gladys
- William Franklyn as Peter Thompson
- Dandy Nichols as Mrs. Budd
- Erik Chitty as ballistics expert
- Howard Layton as surgeon
- Neil Wilson as doctor
- Alastair Hunter as bookmaker
- Bruce Beeby as room-mate
- Nigel Neilson as Hubert
- Audrey Hessey as airport receptionist

== Critical reception ==
The Monthly Film Bulletin wrote: "A confused thriller, handicapped mainly by an implausible (and complicated) story and artificial dialogue. Dennis Price, as the villain, suffers most from the shortcomings of the script; Duncan Lamont makes an agreeable Inspector."

Kine Weekly wrote: "The picture appears a little humdrum at the start, but immediately the heroine becomes suspect interest quickens and there is no let-up before it reaches its neat dénouement. Renee Asherson contributes a warm, ingratiating study as Barbara, Dennis Price iy in his element as nasty piece of work Radley, Duncan Lamont thoroughly convinces as the keen yet understanding 'tec Charles, and guest artist Bonar Colleano registers in the "red herring" role of Radley's partner in crime, The domestic touches are at limes quite moving and subtly broaden the film's Sppiy without robbing its climax of surprise and punch. Points of Appeal. – Tender and suspenseful tale, attractive and resourceful cast, provocative title, handy footage and quota ticket."

In British Sound Films: The Studio Years 1928–1959 David Quinlan rated the film as "average", writing: "Good cast well in character, but dialogue and situations make it routine."
