= Sanders of the River =

1935 British film by Zoltán Korda

Sanders of the River Alternate title: Bosambo
- Film poster
- Directed by: Zoltán Korda
- Written by: Lajos Bíró; Jeffrey Dell; Edgar Wallace; Arthur Wimperis
- Produced by: Alexander Korda
- Starring: Leslie Banks; Paul Robeson
- Cinematography: Osmond Borradaile; Louis Page; Georges Périnal
- Edited by: Charles Crichton
- Music by: Michael Spolianski
- Production company: London Films
- Distributed by: United Artists
- Release date: 8 April 1935
- Running time: 98 minutes
- Country: United Kingdom
- Language: English

Sanders of the River is a 1935 British film directed by the Hungarian-British director, Zoltán Korda, based on the stories of Edgar Wallace. It is set in Colonial Nigeria. The lead Nigerian characters were played by African Americans Paul Robeson and Nina Mae McKinney. The film proved a significant commercial and critical success, giving Korda the first of his four nominations for Best Film at the Venice Film Festival. The Commissioner of Nigeria to London protested the film as slanderous to his country.

== Plot ==
Sanders (Leslie Banks) is a colonial District Commissioner in Colonial Nigeria. He tries to administer his province fairly, including the various tribes comprising the Peoples of the River. He is regarded with respect by some and with fear by others, among whom he is referred to as "Sandi" and "Lord Sandi". He has an ally in Bosambo, a literate and educated tribal chief (played by the African-American actor Paul Robeson).

When Sanders goes on leave, another chief, King Mofolaba, starts a rumour that Sanders has died. Inter-tribal war seems inevitable, and the situation is made worse by gun-runners and slavers. His relief, Ferguson (known to the Nigerians as Lord Ferguson), is unequal to the task; he is captured and killed by King Mofolaba. Sanders returns to restore peace. When Bosambo's wife, Lilongo (Nina Mae McKinney) is kidnapped, the chief tracks down her kidnappers. Captured by them, he is saved by a relief force commanded by Sanders. Bosambo kills King Mofolaba and is subsequently named by Sanders as the King of the Peoples of the River.

== Cast ==
- Leslie Banks as Commissioner R.G. Sanders
- Paul Robeson as Bosambo
- Orlando Martins as K'Lova
- Nina Mae McKinney as Lilongo
- Martin Walker as J. Ferguson
- Robert Cochran as Lieutenant Tibbets (as Robert Cochrane)
- Richard Grey as Captain Hamilton
- Tony Wane as King Mofolaba
- Marqués De Portago as Farini
- Eric Maturin as Smith
- Allan Jeayes as Father O'Leary
- Charles Carson as Sir John
- Jomo Kenyatta as Tribal Leader

Colonial administrator Sir B. Bourdillon is credited as an adviser.

== Paul Robeson's reaction to the film ==
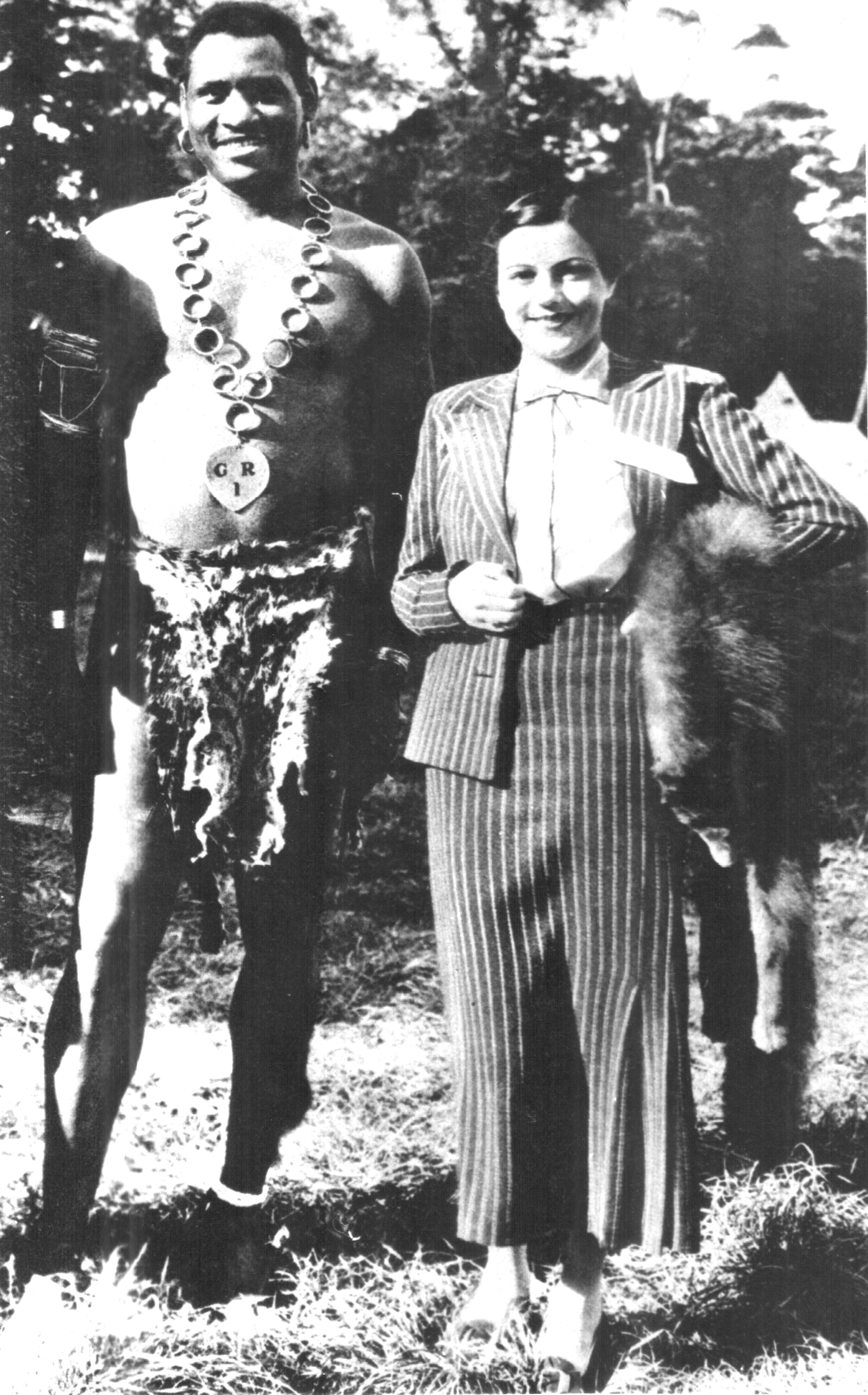
Actor Paul Robeson and actress Irén Ágay on the set of Sanders of the River, London, 1934

The African-American singer and actor Paul Robeson, a civil rights activist, accepted the role of Bosambo while living in London. At the time, he was studying the roots of pan-African culture through studies of language and music. Robeson felt that if he could portray the Nigerian leader Bosambo with cultural accuracy and dignity, he could help audiences—especially Black audiences—to understand and respect the roots of Black culture. He took the role on the condition that the film would portray Africans positively.

The filmmakers took odd steps by sending a film crew on a four-month voyage into remote areas of Africa, when the movie was meant to be about Nigeria. They recorded traditional unknown African dances and ceremonies, with the intention of using this footage integrated with scenes shot in the studio that included the future President and Prime Minister of Kenya, Jomo Kenyatta as one of the extras, on a film supposedly to be about Nigeria.

After the filming, Robeson was asked to return to the studio for retakes of some scenes. He discovered that the film's message had been changed during editing; it seemed to support the continuation of colonial rule in Africa, a message with which Robeson disagreed. The finished film was dedicated to "the handful of white men whose everyday work is an unsung saga of courage and efficiency".

Robeson also discovered his character, Bosambo, had been changed during the editing process from a proud leader to a servile lackey of the colonial administration. He said:

The imperialist plot had been placed in the plot during the last days five days of shooting...I was roped into the picture because I wanted to portray the culture of the African people and I committed a faux pas which convinced me that I had failed to weigh the problems of 150,000,000 native Africans...I hate the picture.

In 1938, Robeson added disparagingly: "It is the only film of mine that can be shown in Italy or Germany, for it shows the negro as Fascist states desire him – savage and childish." Robeson was so disillusioned by the picture that he attempted, but failed, to buy all the prints to prevent it from being shown.

== Reception ==
Upon release, Sanders of the River was a financial hit. However, the film was heavily criticized by many prominent Black figures, including the Commissioner of Nigeria to London, American Communist Ben Davis, and Robeson himself after watching the final cut of the film. Nearly all found it to be pro-colonialism in its themes and slanderous to both Nigerians and Africans more broadly. The negative experience overall contributed to Robeson moving away from acting in major motion pictures. Nevertheless, Sanders of the River ended up being the 11th most popular film at the British box office in 1935–36.

== Other versions ==
The film was parodied in Will Hay's 1938 film Old Bones of the River. This comedy featured characters named Commissioner Sanders, Captain Hamilton and Bosambo.

In 1963, producer Harry Alan Towers made a small-scale German/British international co-production version of the film, Death Drums Along the River, set in the modern day, only using some of the names of the characters. It spawned a sequel, Coast of Skeletons (1965).
