= Probation Officer (TV series) =

British TV drama series (1959–1962)

- Genre: Drama
- Written by: Julian Bond; Peter Yeldham; Phillip Grenville Mann
- Directed by: Peter Sasdy; Christopher Morahan; Royston Morley; Josephine Douglas
- Starring: John Paul; John Scott; Jessica Spencer; David Davies; Henry Oscar; A. J. Brown; Jack Stewart; Humphrey Heathcote; Derek Benfield
- Country of origin: United Kingdom
- Original language: English
- No. of series: 4
- No. of episodes: 109

Production
- Producers: Antony Kearey; Rex Firkin
- Running time: 60 minutes
- Production company: Associated Television

Original release
- Network: ITV
- Release: 14 September 1959 – 14 September 1962

Probation Officer was a British TV series that ran from 1959–1962 about probation officers. It was made by Associated Television and starred John Paul, Jessica Spencer, David Davies and John Scott. Other actors who appeared in the series include Henry Oscar, Honor Blackman, Windsor Davies and Billy Milton.

It was created by Julian Bond and was the first ever one-hour TV drama to screen on ITV. Bond spent months researching the show from real life cases.

== Cast ==
- John Paul as Philip Main (53 episodes, 1959-1961)
- John Scott as Bert Bellman (33 episodes, 1959-1962)
- Jessica Spencer as Maggie Weston (32 episodes, 1960-1962)
- David Davies as Jim Blake (20 episodes, 1959-1960)
- Henry Oscar as Magistrate (15 episodes, 1960-1961)
- A.J. Brown as Judge (12 episodes, 1959-1961)
- Jack Stewart as Andrew Wallace (10 episodes, 1959-1960)
- Honor Blackman as Iris Cope (9 episodes, 1959)
- Humphrey Heathcote as Jailer (9 episodes, 1959-1961)
- Windsor Davies as Bill Morgan (8 episodes, 1962)
- Bernard Brown as Stephen Ryder (8 episodes, 1961-1962)
- Betty Hardy as Miss Randell (7 episodes, 1959)
- John Barrett as Clerk of Court (6 episodes, 1960-1962)
- Derek Benfield as George Cooper (1 episode, 1960)

== Archive status and home media ==
Like many British TV series of the same vintage, the archive holdings of Probation Officer are incomplete, with approximately three-quarters of the episodes missing.

In 2017, Network released "Volume One" on DVD, containing 12 existing episodes from the first series (Episodes 1-3, 5-8, 13-16 & 22 - Episode 8 is missing one courtroom scene) as a three disc DVD boxset. No further releases followed.

== Professional views on the programme ==
Shortly after the first programmes were aired, concerns were raised by both reviewers and the National Association of Probation Officers (Napo (trade union)) who formally disassociated itself from the programme. Later the same year a Home Office spokesperson confirmed that future programmes would be vetted by Seldon Charles Forrester Farmer, Principal Probation Officer for Inner London Probation Service, before television broadcast.

Not all press was negative and once professionally moderated the reports appeared to be predominantly about production and contract challenges with some reporting suggesting that an 'Oscar' should be awarded for performance by June Watts.

== Production issues and withdrawal of the programme ==
A number of programmes had production impacts from the Equity (British trade union) strike in 1961-2; however, the future of many programmes became untenable. In April 1962 the return of Probation Officer was still not secured. A change of the lead actor was announced in May 1962 following unsuccessful contract negotiations.

Reports are less certain on the formal cancellation of the show such as key characters featuring in new shows, but by Late 1962 it seemed to be off the screens.
