= Assignment Foreign Legion =

American TV anthology series (1957)

Assignment Foreign Legion is an American TV series that starred Merle Oberon. It ran on CBS from October 1, 1957, until December 24, 1957.

== Premise ==
The series related activities of the French Foreign Legion during World War II. Oberon narrated episodes and played a newspaper correspondent in search of stories about the Foreign Legion.

== Production ==
The show's producers were M. Smedley Aston and Anthony C. Bartlett. Directors included Don Chaffey, Michael McCarthy and Lance Comfort. Writers included Max Ehrlich. The series was filmed in Morocco, Algiers, England and Spain. Eventually it became too dangerous and filming was completed at Beaconsfield Studios in London. CBS Television Film Sales Inc. distributed the series.

Assignment Foreign Legion was broadcast on Tuesdays from 10:30 to 11 p.m. Eastern Time. Its average cost was $26,000 an episode. It was sponsored by P. Lorillard Company for Kent cigarettes. The trade publication Variety reported, "there was some worry" prior to Lorillard's taking on the show because it "may be too controversial, possibly alienating nationalistic Arabs." The program ended when Lorillard decided to move its sponsorship to Richard Diamond, Private Detective, which began on January 2, 1958.

== Reception ==
Variety said "Stories, acting, and production are of good quality.

One week the show was among the top ten shows in Britain.
