= Charley One-Eye =

1973 film by Don Chaffey

- Theatrical poster for Charley One-Eye (1973)
- Directed by: Don Chaffey
- Written by: Keith Leonard
- Produced by: David Frost; James Swan
- Starring: Richard Roundtree
- Cinematography: Kenneth Talbot
- Edited by: Mike Campbell
- Music by: John Cameron
- Production company: David Paradine Productions
- Distributed by: Paramount Pictures
- Release date: April 18, 1973
- Running time: 96 minutes
- Countries: United Kingdom; United States
- Language: English

Charley One-Eye is a 1973 British-American Western film directed by Don Chaffey and starring Richard Roundtree, Roy Thinnes and Nigel Davenport.

The film was entered into the 24th Berlin International Film Festival.

== Plot ==
A black Union Army deserter and his crippled American Indian hostage form a strained partnership in the interests of surviving the advancing threats of a bounty hunter and neighboring Mexican posse seeking revenge for the deaths of two Mexican merchants.

== Cast ==
- Richard Roundtree as Ben, The Black Man
- Roy Thinnes as The Indian
- Nigel Davenport as The Bounty Hunter
- Jill Pearson as Officer's Wife
- Aldo Sambrell as Mexican Driver
- Luis Aller as Mexican Youth
- Rafael Albaicín as Mexican Leader

== See also ==
- List of American films of 1973
