= Helen Wiggins =

British film editor

- Born: Ellen Matilda Wiggins
- Occupation: Film editor
- Spouse: Chris Millett
- Parent: Jack Wiggins

Helen Wiggins (born Ellen Matilda Wiggins) was a British film editor active from the 1920s through to the 1970s.

== Biography ==
Helen was the daughter of Jack Wiggins, a pioneering British cameraman. She entered the film industry as a film processor in 1920, learning her trade at Film Laboratories Ltd before joining her father at the Topical Film Company, producers of the Topical Budget newsreel in 1921. She continued in newsreels, joining the film laboratories of Empire News Bulletin in 1926 and becoming chief film editor of its sound successor, Universal Talking News in 1930. She was negative cutter, working for her father, on short-lived colour newsreel The National News and film editor on political series Point of View (1939).

She became chief film editor for Pathé News in 1940, leaving in 1948 to form her own company, Helen Wiggins Films Ltd. As a freelancer, she worked on many features, shorts, documentaries, and commercials during the 1940s through the 1970s. In 1962 she married Chris Millett, scriptwriter for National Interest Picture Productions. Wiggins took over the company's production of training films and other government commissions, many of them using animation. Helen Wiggins Films Ltd. went into voluntary liquidation in 1974.

== Selected filmography ==
Fiction films (as editor)

- Dangerous Assignment (1950)
- The Gorbals Story (1950)
- The Third Visitor (1951)
- Worm's Eye View (1951)
- Take Me to Paris (1951)
- Reluctant Heroes (1952)
- King of the Underworld (1952)
- Murder at Scotland Yard (1952)
- Little Big Shot (1952)
- Murder at the Grange (1952) [short]
- Bunty Wins a Pup (1953) [short]
- Tim Driscoll's Donkey (1955)
- The Devil's Pass (1957)
- Not Wanted on Voyage (1957)
- Insomnia Is Good for You (1957) [short]
- Up the Creek (1958)
- Nudist Paradise (1959)
- Call Back Yesterday (1960) [short]
- Mrs. Gibbons' Boys (1962)
- Don't Talk to Strange Men (1962)
- Seventy Deadly Pills (1964)

Film series (as lab worker, negative cutter or film editor)

- Topical Budget (1921-1925)
- Empire News Bulletin (1926-1933)
- Universal Talking News (1930-1940) [chief film editor]
- The National News (1937) [negative cutter]
- Point of View (1939) [film editor]
- Pathé News (1940-1948) [chief film editor]

Helen Wiggins Films Ltd. (mostly as editor)

- Player's Bachelor advertisements (1959-1963)
- Mooring Work Part 1: Laying an Admiralty Standard Mooring (1965)
- Mooring Work Part 2: Maintenance of Admiralty Standard Moorings (1965)
- Blood Groups and Transfusion (1965)
- From Baltimore to Littlehampton (1965)
- Ready for Service (1965)
- Fire Chemistry: What is a Fire? (1966)
- Approaching Automation (1966)
- Boom Defence Part 1: The AST Defence (1966)
- Speed for Safety (1966)
- Boom Defence Part 3: The Mobile Light A/T Defence (1967)
- Uses of Blood (1967)
- Modulation (1967)
- The Muck Problem (1967)
- Sonar Type 195 Part 1: Introduction (1967)
- Helicopters – Theory of Flight (1968)
- This Growing Business (1968)
- Only One in Thirty (1968)
- Egg Quality Control on the Farm (1969) [director]
- Regional Transfusion Centre (1969) [director]
- Electricity on the Farm (1969)
- NBCD Risk and Control Markings (1969)
- Prevent Smoke, Prevent Smog (1969)
- Hydraulics Part 1: Introduction (1970)
- Hydraulics Part 2: Weapon Application (1970)
- Hydraulics Part 3: Marine Application (1970)
- A Question of Priorities (1970)
- Here’s Ernie (1971)
- The Work of Kew Gardens (1971)
- Keys to Metrication: Dimensional Co-ordination (1971)
- AS12 Weapon System Part 1: The AS12 Missile Sight (1971)
- AS12 Weapon System Part 2: The M260 Sight19 (1971)
- Dental First Aid Part 1: Palliative Treatment (1971)
- Dental First Aid Part 2: Surgical Procedures (1971)
- Action Rhino (1972)
- Orienteering: Competing (1972)
- Orienteering: Organising (1972)
