= Casino (1980 film) =

- Genre: Adventure; Drama
- Written by: Richard Carr
- Directed by: Don Chaffey
- Starring: Mike Connors; Barry Van Dyke; Gene Evans; Hedley Mattingly; Gary Burghoff
- Music by: Mark Snow
- Country of origin: United States
- Original language: English

Production
- Executive producers: Douglas S. Cramer; Aaron Spelling
- Producer: E. Duke Vincent
- Production locations: 20th Century Fox Studios - 10201 Pico Blvd., Century City, Los Angeles
- Cinematography: Arch R. Dalzell
- Editor: Jack Harnish
- Running time: 96 minutes
- Production company: Aaron Spelling Productions

Original release
- Network: ABC
- Release: August 1, 1980

Casino is a 1980 American made-for-television adventure film directed by Don Chaffey and starring Mike Connors, Barry Van Dyke and Gene Evans. It originally premiered on ABC on August 1, 1980.

== Plot ==
Nick is a suave and sophisticated gambler who owns a floating hotel and gambling ship, which is plagued by sabotage on its maiden voyage.

== Cast ==
- Mike Connors as Nick
- Barry Van Dyke as Edge
- Gene Evans as Captain K L Fitzgerald
- Hedley Mattingly as Foxworth
- Gary Burghoff as Bill Taylor
- Joseph Cotten as Ed Booker
- Lynda Day George as Carol
- Bo Hopkins as Stoney
- Robert Loggia as Karl Hauptman
- Robert Reed as Darius
- Barry Sullivan as Sam Fletcher
- Sherry Jackson as Jennifer

== Production ==
The story was inspired by Mr Lucky. Star Mike Connors originally envisioned a grittier version with the floating casino being run down. However, the success of The Love Boat prompted the final version to be more glamorous.
