= Victor M. Gover =

British film director (1908–1970)

Victor M. Gover (1908–1970) was a British film director.

== Partial filmography ==
- The Curse of the Wraydons (1946)
- King of the Underworld (1952)
- Murder at Scotland Yard (1952)
