= Clothes and the Woman =

1937 British film by Albert de Courville

- Tucker McGuire and Rod La Rocque in the film
- Directed by: Albert de Courville
- Written by: Franz Schulz; F. McGrew Willis
- Produced by: Julius Hagen
- Starring: Rod La Rocque; Tucker McGuire; Constance Collier; George E. Stone
- Cinematography: Curt Courant
- Edited by: Frank Clarke
- Music by: M. De Wolfe
- Production company: Julius Hagen Productions
- Distributed by: Associated British
- Release date: August 1937
- Running time: 70 minutes
- Country: United Kingdom
- Language: English

Clothes and the Woman is a 1937 British romance film directed by Albert de Courville and starring Rod La Rocque, Tucker McGuire and Constance Collier. It was written by Franz Schulz and F. McGrew Willis and made at Elstree Studios in Hertfordshire.

== Preservation status ==
The British Film Institute National Archive holds a collection of ephemera and stills but no film or video materials.

== Synopsis ==
While enjoying a holiday in the resort of Cannes, a young woman meets and falls in love with a man. However, worried that she is too plain she decides to dress more fashionably.

== Cast ==
- Rod La Rocque as Eric Thrale
- Tucker McGuire as Joan Moore
- Constance Collier as Eugenia
- George E. Stone as Count Bernhardt
- Dorothy Dare as Carol Dixon
- Alastair Sim as Francois
- Mona Goya as Cecilie
- Mary Cole as Marie Thrale
- Jim Gérald as Enrico Castigliani
- Renee Gadd as schoolmistress

== Reception ==
Kine Weekly wrote: "Frivolous romantic comedy fashioned on stereotyped lines. There is some point to the story, but so casual is the treatment that few will grasp it. ... Both the technical work and the direction are slip-shod. The Continental settings never for a moment convince, while the development is hampered by much superfluous by-play. By the time the story does reach conclusions it is too late to recognise humour in its objective. However, one or two players entertain individually, and it is to them that the comedy owes a few laughs."

The Daily Film Renter wrote: "This rather thin story is put over in a somewhat confused fashion, while action takes a back seat in favour of dialogue that can hardly be described as witty."

Picture Show wrote: "This is much ado about nothing, and not too well done."
