= International Airport (film) =

1985 American television film

- Genre: Drama
- Written by: Robert McCullough
- Directed by: Don Chaffey; Charles S. Dubin
- Starring: Gil Gerard; Connie Sellecca; Berlinda Tolbert; Pat Crowley
- Music by: Mark Snow
- Country of origin: United States
- Original language: English

Production
- Executive producers: Douglas S. Cramer; Aaron Spelling
- Producer: Robert McCullough
- Production locations: Los Angeles International Airport - 1 World Way, Los Angeles, California
- Cinematography: Emil Oster
- Editor: Tom Stevens
- Running time: 100 minutes
- Production company: Aaron Spelling Productions

Original release
- Network: ABC
- Release: May 25, 1985

International Airport is a 1985 American made-for-television drama film starring Gil Gerard and Connie Sellecca. It was directed by Charles S. Dubin and Don Chaffey and executive produced by Aaron Spelling and Douglas S. Cramer.

It was called a "combination of Airport and The Love Boat." It was a pilot for a proposed TV series which did not eventuate; however the film screened as a stand-alone movie. This film marks the final appearance of Susan Oliver in her full-length movies, before her death in 1990.

== Plot ==
A plane is headed toward Hawaii. It is believed a bomb is on board. Fuel is running low and the captain is not sure whether he has enough time to jettison the luggage. Airport manager David Montgomery has to decide whether to call the plane back or let it proceed to Hawaii.

== Cast ==
- Gil Gerard as David Montgomery
- Connie Sellecca as Dana Fredricks
- Berlinda Tolbert as Kathy Henderson
- Pat Crowley as Beverly Gerber
- Kitty Moffat as Marjorie Lucas
- Danny Ponce as Pepe
- Cliff Potts as Jack Marshall
- Bill Bixby as Harvey Jameson
- Susan Blakely as Joanne Roberts
- George Grizzard as Martin Harris
- George Kennedy as Rudy Van Leuven
- Vera Miles as Elaine Corley
- Robert Reed as Carl Roberts
- Susan Oliver as Mary Van Leuven
- Robert Vaughn as Captain Powell
