= Wings of Danger =

1952 British film directed by Terence Fisher

- Theatrical release poster
- Directed by: Terence Fisher
- Screenplay by: John Gilling
- Based on: Dead on Course (story) by Trevor Dudley Smith and Packham Webb
- Produced by: Anthony Hinds
- Starring: Zachary Scott; Robert Beatty; Naomi Chance; Kay Kendall
- Cinematography: Walter J. Harvey; Peter Bryan
- Edited by: James Needs
- Music by: Malcolm Arnold
- Production company: Hammer Film Productions
- Distributed by: Exclusive Films (UK); Lippert Pictures (US)
- Release dates: 1 April 1952 (US); 26 May 1952 (UK)
- Running time: 73 minutes
- Country: United Kingdom
- Language: English

Wings of Danger is a 1952 British second feature crime film directed by Terence Fisher and starring Zachary Scott, Robert Beatty and Kay Kendall. The screenplay, based on the 1951 story Dead on Course by Trevor Dudley Smith and Packham Webb, concerns a pilot who is suspected of smuggling. Jimmy Sangster was assistant director, Michael Carreras handled casting, and Phil Leakey did makeup. It was first released in the United States in April 1952 under its working title Dead on Course.

It was later released in the UK (as Wings of Danger) on May 26, 1952 (on a double bill with FBI Girl), and it was re-released again later in Feb., 1953.

== Plot ==
At Spencer Airlines in England, American pilot Richard "Van" Van Ness tries to stop his friend Nick Talbot from taking off in a storm. Nick threatens to tell their boss, Boyd Spencer, that Van suffers from blackouts. Next morning, Van's fears come true when debris from Nick's aircraft washes ashore.

Van tells Spencer who does not seem to care about Nick dying. Van asks Spencer's girlfriend, Alexia LaRoche to exchange pounds for dollars. The following night, he visits his girlfriend, Nick's sister Avril who is being blackmailed by a man named Snell to keep her father from discovering Nick's post-war black market business.

Van forces Snell to confess and learns that a set of tools is to be delivered to Cherbourg for Spencer. Van locates them in the storage room, however, another man runs from the room and escapes on a motorcycle. Customs officer Inspector Maxwell discovers the tools are made of solid gold.

Later, the bellboy is shot driving Van's car to the front door, and Van has Snell arrested. Alexia reveals that Spencer has in his office a coded notebook with financial information. Van breaks into Spencer's darkened office and finds the notebook, but hears Spencer collapse and sees the man from the storage building rush out to his motorcycle.

Van follows, but suffers a blackout and crashes his car. The mysterious man rescues him and when Van comes to in bed in a cottage, he finds that his rescuer is Nick; the cottage is the home of Nick's girlfriend Jeanette. Nick admits he faked his death because he is wanted by the French police and Spencer knows that. Nick also knows Spencer has been making counterfeit dollars from old Nazi forging plates.

Van and Nick confront Spencer but Nick is shot. Van leaves Nick with Jeanette and Avril and returns with Inspector Maxwell. Together they chase Spencer to the airport. He flies away, but his engines fail and he quickly crashes and dies. Nick is also dying but tells Avril that Van is afraid to marry her because of his blackouts.

Van tells Avril that he is leaving town for a while to think things over but just as his aircraft is about to take off, Avril tells the pilot to leave without him.

== Cast ==
- Zachary Scott as Richard Van Ness
- Robert Beatty as Nick Talbot
- Naomi Chance as Avril Talbot
- Kay Kendall as Alexia LaRoche
- Colin Tapley as Inspector Maxwell
- Arthur Lane as Boyd Spencer
- Harold Lang as Snell, the blackmailer
- Diane Cilento as Jeannette
- Jack Allen as Tniscott
- Douglas Muir as Doctor Wilner
- Ian Fleming as Talbot
- Larry Taylor as O'Gorman, a henchman
- Darcy Conyers as Signals Officer
- Sheila Raynor as nurse
- Nigel Neilson as Duty Officer (uncredited)
- Courtney Hope as Mrs Clarence, hotel tenant
- Anthony T. Miles as Sam, desk clerk
- James Steele as First Flying Officer
- Russ Allen as Second Flying Officer
- June Ashley as blonde in sportscar (uncredited)
- June Mitchell as blonde in sportscar (uncredited)
- Natasha Sokolova as blonde in sportscar (uncredited)

== Production ==
The film was made by Hammer Films and shot at the Riverside Studios in Hammersmith. Production began in late September 1951 with location shooting in Rye, East Sussex.

The aircraft used in Wings of Danger are:

- De Havilland DH.89A Dominie, c/n 6886, G-AGSI
- Percival Proctor Mk II, c/n H548, G-AIIL

== Release ==
In Britain the film was released on a double bill with an American film called FBI Girl (1951). Chibnall and McFarlane in The British 'B' Film note that "in spite of its relatively brief running time and indifferent trade reviews, the film duly played as a first feature on the Gaumont circuit, and was thus a milestone in Hammer's progress."

The United States release, by Lippert Pictures, was trimmed by a couple of minutes.

== Critical reception ==
Monthly Film Bulletin said "Thriller with a moral ending, in which the good people survive and the bad ones don't. In this, and in other ways, quite unremarkable."

Variety said "Uninspired, uninteresting plot ingredients hamper this weak British entry. ... Action is confusing throughout. ... Miss Chance is as capable as her role will allow, but others pass in and out of the scene in inconsequential procession. Terence Fisher's direction carries little meaning, and production reins in the hands of Anthony Hind were loosely controlled."

Aviation film historian Stephen Pendo in Aviation in the Cinema (1985) compared the film to the "dull" Arctic Flight (1952), stating that Arctic Flight "... was still better than Wings of Danger, a British film with Zachary Scott as an airline pilot mixed up in a smuggling web or counterfeiting ring, depending on how one interprets the vague plot."

In British Sound Films: The Studio Years 1928–1959 David Quinlan rated the film as "average", calling it a "lacklustre thriller."
