= Arthur Lane (actor) =

British actor (1910–1987)

Arthur Francis Lane (11 June 1910 – 28 April 1987) was a British actor.

== Filmography ==
Year	Title	Role	Notes
1949	Don't Ever Leave Me	1st Drunk	Uncredited
1949	Diamond City	Maxie	
1949	The Interrupted Journey	Constable Cowley	
1950	Come Dance with Me		
1950	Sunset Boulevard	Camera Operator	Uncredited
1952	Wings of Danger	Boyd Spencer	
1952	It Started in Paradise	Sydney Bruce	
1953	The Dog and the Diamonds	Crook	
1954	Face the Music	Jeff Colt	
1955	Track the Man Down	John Cross	Uncredited
1955	Secret Venture	Bob Hendon	(final film role)
