= Dorothy Bramhall =

British actress and former model (1911–2004)

- Born: 1911
- Died: 2004 (aged 92–93)
- Occupations: Actress and Former model

Dorothy Bramhall (1911–2004) was a British actress and former model.

== Selected filmography ==
- Love Story (1944)
- I See a Dark Stranger (1946)
- Bothered by a Beard (1946)
- Take My Life (1947)
- The White Unicorn (1947)
- The Clouded Crystal (1948)
- A Run for Your Money (1949)
- Encore (1951)
- Wide Boy (1952)
- Inspector Morley: Late of Scotland Yard (1952) - (TV Series) - (with Patrick Barr; Tod Slaughter; Arthur Howard; Johnny Briggs (actor))
- Murder at Scotland Yard (1953)
- To Dorothy a Son (1954)
- Scotland Yard (1954) Passenger to Tokyo, Mrs Craig
