= Death Drums Along the River =

1963 British film by Lawrence Huntington

- DVD cover
- Directed by: Lawrence Huntington
- Written by: Harry Alan Towers; Lawrence Huntington; Nicolas Roeg
- Produced by: Harry Alan Towers
- Starring: Richard Todd; Marianne Koch; Albert Lieven; Walter Rilla
- Cinematography: Robert Huke
- Music by: Sidney Torch
- Production companies: Hallam Productions; Constantin Film
- Distributed by: Constantin Film (Germany); Planet Films (UK)
- Release dates: 20 December 1963 (Germany); 27 March 1965 (UK)
- Running time: 83 minutes
- Countries: United Kingdom; West Germany; South Africa
- Language: English

Death Drums Along the River (U.S. title: Sanders; also known as Sanders of the River, Inquietante Suceso En Gondra, and Todestrommeln Am Grossen Fluss) is a 1963 British-German international co-production adventure film directed by Lawrence Huntingdon and starring Richard Todd and Marianne Koch.

The film uses the characters from Edgar Wallace's 1911 novel Sanders of the River and Zoltán Korda's 1935 film based on the novel, but placed in a totally different story. Filmed on location in South Africa, it was the first feature film of British producer Harry Alan Towers.

== Plot ==
In an unnamed small British colony on the west coast of Africa, somewhat resembling the Gambia, and according to the dialogue next to Senegal, two policemen patrolling a wharf sight a sack of peanuts dropped by stevedores. As the sack breaks the workers discover a pouch in it that is quickly grabbed by a man who then runs away. The policemen chase him and he eventually kills one of them before disappearing. Police Commissioner Sanders questions Pearson, a suspected criminal, but finds no information.

At the same time a Dr Jung arrives at the airport and is met by Todd's assistant, Inspector Hamilton, who is pleasantly surprised that Dr Jung is both female and pretty. Dr Jung is going to see Dr Schneider who runs a clinic up-river, close to the colony's eastern border. Also on the plane with her is an American journalist who wishes to visit the clinic to do a story and turns out to be an old friend of Pearson.

Commissioner Sanders begins to suspect that the clinic is a location for diamonds being smuggled across the border. He asks what distant drumming means and is told that they signal a funeral. He interrupts this native burial ceremony as he wishes to identify the body. They are allegedly burying the murderer from the first scene. Sanders doesn't believe this, but just as he finds the murderer and arrests him, a shot fires out, and truly kills him.

Meanwhile, it is revealed that Dr Schneider, who is very ill, is receiving a 10% dose of the drug he needs instead of 100%. He is aware of the diamonds on his land but wants to give it back to the natives when he dies. Ultimately it is his assistant Dr Weiss who is revealed as the smuggler.

== Main cast ==
- Richard Todd as Commissioner Harry Sanders
- Marianne Koch as Dr Inge Jung
- Albert Lieven as Dr Weiss
- Walter Rilla as Dr Schneider
- Jeremy Lloyd as Hamilton
- Robert Arden as Hunter
- Vivi Bach as Marlene
- Bill Brewer as Pearson
- Simon Sabela as Bosambo

== Production ==
The film was shot in Durban, Durban North, Zululand and Lake St Lucia.

Harry Alan Towers produced several films in South Africa with financing from Constantin Film in West Germany and casts of actors from that country.

The film was marketed in West Germany as one of the then popular series of Edgar Wallace films, but it has very little to do with Wallace's novel Sanders of the River, or the previous films based on it, apart from the name Sanders and the boat Zaire, though here it is a small motorboat rather than a steamer. The intertribal warfare in Wallace's work has been replaced by a standard detective story involving murder and diamond-smuggling.

Richard Todd had been in Africa filming The Hellions (1961) and was attempting to produce a film of Ian Fleming's The Diamond Smugglers when Harry Alan Towers offered him the lead. He later wrote, "a couple of years earlier I would not have given a second thought to such a project. However, [executive] Mac Scott assured me that this film was to be of reasonable quality and would get Warner-Pathé distribution if I were in it."

Todd reprised the role of Harry Sanders in Coast of Skeletons (1965).

== Critical reception ==
The Monthly Film Bulletin wrote: "Based on Edgar Wallace's characters, this film has a barely nodding acquaintance with the famous 'Sanders of the River' stories. The scene is contemporary Africa, with references to imminent independence of the territory and the French getting out of Senegal; the grand old paddle-steamer "Zaire" is now a mere modern launch; Hamilton appears in a subsidiary part, modified to emerge as something reminiscent of Bones; and poor old Sanders is here nothing more than a police detective. The African locale is not markedly exploited, though the native village looks authentic and the chants sound like the real thing. Richard Todd is sorely miscast as Sanders, and both script and acting are desultory."
