= Andrew Todd (rugby union) =

Irish rugby union player

Andrew Todd MC
- Full name: Andrew William Palethorpe Todd
- Born: 6 July 1892 Ireland
- Died: 15 March 1942 (aged 49) Epsom, Surrey, England
- University: Trinity College Dublin
- Notable relative: Richard Todd (son)

Rugby union career
- Position: Fullback
International career
Years	Team	Apps	(Points)
1913–14	Ireland	3	(0)

Andrew William Palethorpe Todd (6 July 1892 — 15 March 1942) was a British Army officer, physician and Ireland international rugby union player. He was the father of actor Richard Todd.

== Biography ==
The son of a county court judge, Todd grew up in Dublin and studied medicine at Trinity College Dublin, during which time he played rugby for Dublin University. He was one of three fullbacks tried by Ireland in the 1913 Five Nations and the only one to return the following year, to gain his third and final cap in a win over France in Paris.

Todd served as an officer in the Royal Army Medical Corps and was awarded the Military Cross for gallantry during World War I. He spent some time in India after the war as an Army physician and returned to Britain during the 1920s to practice medicine. In World War I, Todd was a ship surgeon and later served at a military hospital in England. He died of pneumonia in 1942.

== See also ==
- List of Ireland national rugby union players
