= Murder at Scotland Yard =

1953 British film by Victor M. Gover

- Film titles
- Directed by: Victor M. Gover
- Written by: John Gilling
- Starring: Todd Slaughter; Patrick Barr; Tucker McGuire
- Cinematography: S.D. Onions
- Edited by: Helen Wiggins
- Music by: W.L. Trytel
- Production company: Bushey Studios
- Release date: 1953
- Running time: 75 minutes
- Country: United Kingdom
- Language: English

Murder at Scotland Yard is 1953 British crime film directed by Victor M. Gover and starring Tod Slaughter, Patrick Barr and Tucker McGuire. It was written by John Gilling and is a sequel to Gover's King of the Underworld (1952).

== Plot ==
Master criminal Terence Reilly has escaped from prison. He steals diamonds and is responsible for a series of murders. Inspector Morley of Scotland Yard is called in to recapture him.

== Cast ==
- Tod Slaughter as Terence Reilly
- Patrick Barr as Inspector Morley
- Tucker McGuire as Eileen Trotter
- Dorothy Bramhall as Maria Flame
- Tom Macaulay as Inspector Grant

== Production ==
The film was made at Bushey Studios. It was Slaughter's last feature film.

== Critical reception ==
The Monthly Film Bulletin wrote: "A very indifferently made crime melodrama. The succession of sketchy and barely related characters and incidents fails to arouse sympathy or excitement; and the technique – particularly the recording – is surprisingly poor. The only consolation lies in the few appearances of Tod Slaughter in one of his traditional villain roles."

Kine Weekly wrote: "Rough-and-ready thriller ... The characterisation and direction leave much to be desired and the script is dishevelled, but despite these impediments its surface action carries a modest kick. ... The picture, a bit of a rigmarole, takes the longest route to its salutary ending, but at least the detours help to create valuable quota footage. Patrick Barr makes a resolute Morley, but old timer Tod Slaughter is a trifle too fruity as Reilly."

The Daily Film Renter wrote: "That fruitiest of screen and stage villains, Tod Slaughter, has a minor day out here in a further exposition of lip-smacking gusto. ... This is precisely the type of straightforward action which the masses understand and savour. Director Victor Gover wastes little time on subtlety, and thus the development emerges as colourful and forthright in its alternations of surface action, thrill and suspense, the latter remaining an especial feature in its presentation of the master crook's various attempts at killing off his adversaries."
