= The Story of Robin Hood and His Merrie Men =

1952 film by Ken Annakin

The Story of Robin Hood and his Merrie Men
- Theatrical release poster
- Directed by: Ken Annakin
- Written by: Lawrence Edward Watkin
- Produced by: Perce Pearce; Walt Disney
- Starring: Richard Todd; Joan Rice
- Cinematography: Guy Green
- Edited by: Gordon Pilkington
- Music by: Clifton Parker
- Production company: RKO-Walt Disney British Productions Limited
- Distributed by: RKO Radio Pictures Ltd.
- Release dates: 13 March 1952 (London); 26 June 1952 (United States)
- Running time: 84 minutes
- Countries: United States; United Kingdom
- Language: English
- Box office: $2.1 million (US rentals)

The Story of Robin Hood and his Merrie Men is a 1952 action-adventure film produced by RKO-Walt Disney British Productions, based on the Robin Hood legend, made in Technicolor and filmed in Buckinghamshire, England. It was written by Lawrence Edward Watkin and directed by Ken Annakin. It is the second of Disney's complete live-action films, after Treasure Island (1950), and the first of four films Annakin directed for Disney. It was also the first of three films Richard Todd made for the studio.

== Plot ==
Young Robert Fitzooth, in love with Maid Marian, enters an archery contest with his father Sir Hugh at King Richard's palace. On the way home, Sir Hugh is killed by henchmen of Prince John. Robin takes up the life of an outlaw, taking on the name Robin Hood and gathering together his band of Merry Men with him in Sherwood Forest, to avenge Sir Hugh's death and to help the people of the land whom Prince John is over taxing.

== Cast ==
- Richard Todd as Robin Fitzooth/Robin Hood
- Joan Rice as Maid Marian
- Peter Finch as the Sheriff of Nottingham
- James Hayter as Friar Tuck
- James Robertson Justice as Little John
- Martita Hunt as Queen Eleanor of Aquitaine
- Hubert Gregg as Prince John
- Elton Hayes as Alan-a-Dale
- Anthony Eustrel as the Archbishop of Canterbury
- Patrick Barr as King Richard
- Anthony Forwood as Will Scarlet
- Reginald Tate as Sir Hugh Fitzooth
- Bill Owen as Will Stutely
- Hal Osmond as Much the Miller
- Louise Hampton as Tyb
- Richard Graydon as Merrie Man
- Michael Hordern as Scathelock
- Bill Travers as Posse Man
- Clement McCallin as The Earl of Huntingdon
- Nigel Neilson as Merrie Man
- Geoffrey Lumsden as Merrie Man
- Julian Somers as Posse Leader
- Cavan Malone as Giles the Page Boy
- Fred Johnson as the Previous Sheriff of Nottingham

== Production ==
The idea to make the film was Walt Disney's. He wanted to use colour, use a more historically accurate script than in most previous Robin Hood films, and to shoot on location in Sherwood Forest. Ken Annakin was loaned out from J. Arthur Rank Films, to whom he was under contract, to make the film.

Annakin says the entire film was storyboarded in advance by Carmen Dillon and Guy Green, so as to ensure Walt Disney to keep creative control, adding "quite often I had to bite my tongue or be prepared to quit", but Annakin soon earned Disney's respect and the two men went on to make several films together.

Production began in April 1951 at Denham Film Studios in London. This was the second film Disney made in the United Kingdom, the first being Treasure Island (1950). These and several other Disney films were made using British funds frozen during World War II. Originally Bobby Driscoll was going to be featured in the film as a boy in Robin (Richard Todd)'s camp, but he was unable to appear in the film because he had violated British labour laws with his appearance in Treasure Island. In Driscoll's absence, the story was rewritten to focus on the romantic relationship between Robin Hood and Maid Marian (Joan Rice). Robert Newton, who was originally cast as Friar Tuck, had to be recast with James Hayter after he was cast in Androcles and the Lion. The Story of Robin Hood and His Merrie Men was filmed in 3-strip Technicolor.

Annakin said he was unhappy with the casting of Joan Rice as Maid Marian, feeling she could not act, but says Disney insisted she play the role. Richard Todd was short and often had to walk on a plank or stand on an apple box next to Rice. Annakin said Peter Finch "brought a freshness and a snide threat to the villainous character, without the histrionics of his predecessors in the role. We became great friends and over the years I was sad to see how the strain of show business made Peter hit the bottle."

== Release ==
The world premiere was in London on March 13, 1952. Annakin called it "a happy, triumphant evening. My only private reservation was that despite my efforts to shake off the strait-jacket of the continuity sketches, some of the acting seemed stilted and stagey. I swore that this must never happen on my second Disney movie".

The film opened in New York on June 26, 1952. The production was promoted in the short film The Riddle of Robin Hood.

The film was one of the most popular in Britain in 1952, and would eventually gross over $4,578,000 at the American box office.

== Critical reception ==
The New York Times called it "an expert rendition of an ancient legend that is as pretty as its Technicolor hues and as lively as a sturdy Western... (T)he action - the courtly speeches and romance are kept to a sensible minimum - is robust and fairly continuous"; and Leonard Maltin similarly noted a "zesty, colorful retelling of the familiar story, filmed in England by Walt Disney with excellent cast. Not as personality oriented as other versions, but just as good in its own way"; and the Radio Times wrote: "This may not hold a candle to the Errol Flynn version, but the authentic English locations and fine Technicolor photography make it excellent family entertainment. Richard Todd enjoys himself as the famous outlaw, but is up against strong competition from Peter Finch as the wicked Sheriff of Nottingham and the delightful Hubert Gregg, cast against type as the evil King John."

== Home media ==
A Laserdisc was released in 1992, a VHS tape was released in 1994 (the Walt Disney's Studio Film Collection) and a limited Disney Movie Club DVD was released in July 2006. All releases are 1.33:1 fullscreen in monaural (as shot).

A Disneyland Records LP of four songs from the soundtrack with narration by Dallas McKennon was released in 1963.

== See also ==
- List of films and television series featuring Robin Hood
- Robin Hood (1973 film) - Walt Disney productions second feature film based on the legend of Robin Hood featuring Animated Anthropomorped Animals.

== Citation ==
- Annakin, Ken (2001). So you wanna be a director?. Tomahawk Press. ISBN 9780953192656.
