= Theatre Royal (1955 TV series) =

American TV drama series (1955–1956)

Theatre Royal, aka Lilli Palmer Theatre, was a British half-hour television anthology series hosted by Lilli Palmer.

It was the first ITV Play series, and was first transmitted on 25 September 1955 with the televised Dickens episode, Bardell v Pickwick. Thirty-four episodes aired in the UK on ATV London in 1955 and 1956. The series was produced by Harry Alan Towers' independent production company, Towers of London.

Notable guest stars included Maggie Smith, Wendy Hiller, Stephen Boyd, Marius Goring, Michael Gough and Wilfrid Hyde-White.
