= The Hasty Heart =

1949 British film by Vincent Sherman

- Original film poster
- Directed by: Vincent Sherman
- Written by: Ranald MacDougall
- Based on: The Hasty Heart; 1945 play by John Patrick
- Produced by: Russel Crouse; Howard Lindsay
- Starring: Richard Todd; Ronald Reagan; Patricia Neal
- Cinematography: Wilkie Cooper
- Edited by: Edward B. Jarvis
- Music by: Jack Beaver
- Distributed by: Associated British-Pathé(UK); Warner Bros. Pictures (US)
- Release dates: 13 September 1949 (Premiere, London)
- Running time: 102 minutes
- Country: United Kingdom
- Language: English
- Box office: £248,584 (UK)

The Hasty Heart is a 1949 Anglo-American war drama film, starring Ronald Reagan, Patricia Neal and Richard Todd, and directed by Vincent Sherman. It was written by Ranald MacDougall based on the 1945 play of the same name by John Patrick.

The film tells the story of a group of wounded Allied soldiers in a Pacific theatre mobile surgery unit immediately after the end of World War II, who, after initial resentment and ostracism, rally around a loner, an unappreciative Scottish soldier they know is dying.

The title is taken from the proverb "sorrow is born in the hasty heart", which is quoted at several points in the film.

== Plot ==
In Burma during the Pacific Theatre of World War II in 1945, a group of wounded Allied soldiers is at a makeshift British military hospital in the jungle. As they have all been there for some time, they have formed a strong bond. They include "Yank", the lone American, recovering from malaria; "Tommy", an Englishman; "Kiwi", a New Zealander; "Digger", an Australian; and "Blossom", an African. They are all under the care of Sister Margaret Parker.

Lt. Col. Dunn, the senior doctor of the hospital, tells the men that they will be receiving a new patient soon, and that they should be extra kind to him. He is a Scot, and while he seems to have recovered from his operation, his abnormal kidney means that he will die within a few weeks. Dunn tells the men that the Scot will be outwardly healthy until one day he will suddenly die when his kidney fails. When the Scot arrives, Cpl. Lachlan "Lachie" MacLachlan is very gruff and mean. He is constantly suspicious of his fellow patients attempting to make friends with him.

Margaret tries to convince Lachie to buy a regimental kilt, something he feels is too expensive to purchase, because he recently bought a house in Scotland to which he intends to return. However, during Lachie's 24th birthday party, Margaret gives him a kilt, and the rest of his friends contribute something for his uniform. Lachie is proud, and they all pose for photos, with the others trying to answer the question of whether he wears anything under his kilt.

Lachie warms to the soldiers and opens up about his past, telling them, "They say sorrow is born in the hasty heart." He reveals to Margaret that his aloof and suspicious behaviour results from cruelty inflicted on him in his youth as an illegitimate child. Later, he confesses to Yank that he is in love with Margaret and will propose to her. Yank tries to convince him otherwise, but when Lachie does propose, she accepts because that is what will make him really happy.

Dunn comes to the ward and tells Lachie that he can return to Scotland immediately if he wishes. When Lachie asks why he is receiving special treatment, the doctor tells him the truth about his condition and that his death is imminent. Lachie explodes at his friends, thinking they befriended him only because he was sick and dying. He decides to return to Scotland. Blossom offers him a necklace, but when Lachie rejects it, Yank explains that Blossom does not speak English and therefore could not have known that Lachie was dying. As he is leaving, he breaks down and says he does not want to die alone. With that realisation, he softens and decides to stay on and have his picture taken in his uniform with the men, happy to be with true friends at last in his last few days.

== Cast ==
- Richard Todd as Cpl. Lachlan "Lachie" MacLachlan, the Scot
- Ronald Reagan as Yank, the American
- Patricia Neal as Sister Margaret Parker
- Anthony Nicholls as Lieutenant Colonel Dunn
- Howard Marion-Crawford as Tommy, the Englishman
- Ralph Michael as Kiwi, the New Zealander
- John Sherman as Digger, the Australian
- Alfie Bass as orderly
- Orlando Martins as Blossom, the African
- Robert Douglas as off-screen narrator (uncredited)

== Production ==
Warner Bros. Pictures bought the film rights to the play from American dramatist John Patrick for $100,000 and a percentage of the profits in 1945. It originally announced John Dall would play the lead of Lachie.

According to Vincent Sherman, the studio were hesitant to film the play, as they were worried the public was tired of war stories, but Sherman liked the play. When Warner Bros. asked the director to make Backfire (completed in 1948, though not released until 1950), he agreed on condition that the studio would also let him direct The Hasty Heart. Warners agreed, deciding to make the film in London with Associated British, a company it partly owned. The studio would provide Sherman and two American stars, Patricia Neal and Ronald Reagan, but was open to the part of Lachie being played by a newcomer.

Gordon Jackson tested for the part of Lachie, but the studio wanted someone who was more of a leading man to play the role. Richard Todd, who was under contract to Associated British, was cast, instead, after a successful screen test. Sherman said Reagan hoped to play the role of Lachie and was unhappy to be assigned the part of Yank; he claims the actor was professional during the film, but disliked it after Sherman tried to get Reagan to improve his acting in a scene.

"I wasn't right at all for the nurse", said Patricia Neal. "But it was my first sympathetic part, at least."

Todd later played the role on stage in the 1970s.

== Reception ==
=== Box office ===
The film ranked 10th among popular films at the British box office in 1949. It was a box-office disappointment in the US.

=== Critical ===
The Monthly Film Bulletin wrote: "A pedestrian transcription of the sentimental stage play. ... Richard Todd plays with commendable discretion."

Kine Weekly wrote: "The film has ... only a handful of characters and its main action is restricted to one set, but it nevertheless, keeps steadily on the move and cleverly interleaves its many big dramatic moments with dry comedy touches. The dialogue is particularly good and fits the skilfully drawn types perfectly. The "happy"ending is, perhaps, a trifle confected, but the one deliberate concession to box-office tradition in no way impairs the whole."

Variety wrote: "This is obviously a sentimental story, and no attempt-has been made to conceal it. Instead, director Vincent Sherman has clearly gone all out to make this the strong point of the picture and give it particular appeal to women audiences. Owing to the limitations of movement, the film tends to be slow in parts, and would be helped by careful pruning. Ronald Reagan and Patricia Neal, imported from Hollywood for this production, are in good form. The former is naturally at home playing the part of the Yank ambulance driver, and Miss Neal brings charm and conviction to the role of the Sister. Richard Todd, elevated to star billing, is perfectly cast as the unrelenting Scot, and his broad accent should be followed without much difficulty by American audiences."

== Accolades ==
Richard Todd was nominated for the Academy Award for Best Actor.

The film won two Golden Globes: Richard Todd for New Star Of The Year – Actor; and for Best Film Promoting International Understanding.

== TV remakes ==
The Hasty Heart was remade for television in 1957, 1958 and 1983, the latter starring Gregory Harrison, Perry King, and Cheryl Ladd. King won a Golden Globe nomination for his performance.
