= The Angel with the Trumpet (1950 film) =

1950 film by Anthony Bushell

- DVD cover
- Directed by: Anthony Bushell
- Written by: Franz Tassie; Karl Hartl
- Produced by: Karl Hartl
- Starring: Eileen Herlie
- Cinematography: Robert Krasker
- Edited by: Reginald Beck (sup.)
- Music by: Willy Schmidt-Gentner
- Color process: Black and white
- Production company: London Films
- Distributed by: British Lion Films
- Release date: 20 March 1950
- Running time: 99 minutes
- Country: United Kingdom
- Language: English
- Box office: £86,265

The Angel with the Trumpet is a 1950 British drama film directed by Anthony Bushell and starring Eileen Herlie, Basil Sydney and Norman Wooland. Based on a novel by Ernst Lothar, the film follows the rise and fall of an Austrian aristocrat and her eventual death following the Anschluss. The film is a remake of a 1948 Austrian film Der Engel mit der Posaune.

== Plot ==
Henrietta Stein, daughter of a Jewish academic, is the mistress of the Habsburg crown prince, who cannot marry her. She chooses instead a loveless marriage with Francis Alt, the head of the Alt Viennese piano- manufacturing firm. Only their mutual friend Baron Hugo Traun knows of their feelings. On the day of her marriage, the prince kills himself in despair.

Francis and Henrietta raise their three children in the family home but 12 years later, the baron visits her in Vienna, and they have an affair. Henrietta plans to leave her husband. The affair is interrupted when her brother-in-law is dying and her son finds her in the arms of the baron. Returning home, she admits her affair to her husband, who has returned unexpectedly. The next morning, her husband kills the baron in a duel.

Four years later, World War I begins and Henrietta's husband and sons enlist. Her husband is injured in the war; he is paralyzed and can no longer speak. Her son Paul takes command of the factory and her daughter Monica leaves for America with her boyfriend Gino to escape the conditions in Vienna. Her son Herman speculates in illegal arms trading and loses a great deal of money. Faced with jail, he asks her for the money, but she does not have it. She gives him her diamonds and evicts him from the house. The only good news comes when Paul announces his engagement. She relates all of the news to her husband, who writes her a note apologizing for marrying her, and they reconcile.

Years later, Herman joins the Nazis. The Anschluss takes place and the Nazis come to arrest her for not flying their flag on her house. Before they take her away, she jumps out of a third-storey window to her death. Herman arrives minutes later to tell her that he has arranged for her Jewish ancestry to be erased for her own safety, but she is already dead.

World War II comes, and the Alt family home is destroyed by bombing. The piano factory is in ruins, but Paul, his wife, their children and one remaining worker rebuild the factory and produce their first new piano.

== Cast ==
- Eileen Herlie as Henrietta Stein
- Basil Sydney as Francis Alt
- Norman Wooland as Prince Rudolf
- Maria Schell as Anna Linden
- Olga Edwardes as Monica Alt
- Andrew Cruickshank as Otto Alt
- John Justin as Paul Alt
- Oskar Werner as Herman Alt
- Anthony Bushell as Baron Hugo Traun
- David Davies as Nazi leader
- Anton Edthofer as Emperor Franz Joseph
- Jane Henderson as Gretel Paskiewicz
- Wilfrid Hyde-White as Simmerl
- John Van Eyssen as Albert Drauffer
- Nigel Neilson as Nazi
- Jack Hawkins as narrator

== Production ==
To reduce costs, this film reused much of the earlier Austrian film, especially for distance shots and for scenes with minor characters, whose voices were dubbed.

Maria Schell and Oskar Werner launched their international careers in this film. It was the first film that Anthony Bushell directed.
