= The Man Upstairs (1958 film) =

British drama by Don Chaffey

- Original UK quad poster
- Directed by: Don Chaffey
- Written by: Alun Falconer; Robert Dunbar; Don Chaffey
- Produced by: Robert Dunbar
- Starring: Richard Attenborough; Bernard Lee; Donald Houston
- Cinematography: Gerald Gibbs
- Edited by: John Trumper
- Release date: 30 September 1958
- Running time: 88 min.
- Country: United Kingdom
- Language: English

The Man Upstairs is a 1958 British psychological drama film directed by Don Chaffey and starring Richard Attenborough and Bernard Lee. The film was produced by Robert Dunbar for Act Films Ltd.

== Plot ==
Peter Watson, a tenant of a boarding house, is troubled with pain and an inability to sleep. He repeatedly tries unsuccessfully to light the gas-fire that requires coins and seeks help from another lodger, artist Nicholas, who is spending the night with his model, and is reluctant to be disturbed. Another neighbour, Pollen, calls for police help. The other occupants in the property are awake by this time, and one of them, Mrs Barnes, tries to help the mentally confused Watson (known to them as John Wilson) but he also refuses her help. The police clash with Mr Sanderson, a mental health worker, who thinks he can take Watson, who is armed, without complications, but when a police sergeant is injured Inspector Thompson is determined to remove him by force if necessary. Eventually Mrs Barnes manages to persuade the sick man to leave his room, and Mr Sanderson accompanies him to a waiting ambulance for hospital treatment.

== Cast ==
- Richard Attenborough as Peter Watson
- Bernard Lee as Inspector Thompson
- Donald Houston as Mr. Sanderson
- Dorothy Alison as Mrs. Barnes
- Patricia Jessel as Mrs. Lawrence
- Virginia Maskell as Helen Grey
- Kenneth Griffith as Pollen
- Alfred Burke as Mr. Barnes
- Charles Houston as Nicholas
- Maureen Connell as Eunice Blair
- Amy Dalby as Miss Acres
- Walter Hudd as Superintendent
- Patrick Jordan as injured Sergeant
- Graham Stewart as Sergeant Morris
- Victor Brooks as Sergeant Collins
- Edward Judd as P.C. Stevens

== Box office ==
Kinematograph Weekly said the film "received exceptional notices yet didn't quite make the grade" at the box office.

== Critical reception ==
The Monthly Film Bulletin wrote: "In its situation, its skilful use of suspense and even some of its details (the alarm clock, the trapped man shouting to the crowd) this film recalls Le Jour Se Léve [1939]. But in this case the focus is less on the man than on the reactions of the people around him; argument is substituted for lyricism and the conflict between kindness and brute force, despite occasional over-simplification, is absorbing. Editing and direction are crisp, while the characters are nicely pointed in the script and acting. If Richard Attenborough cannot repeat the performance of [Jean] Gabin he is effective within the compass of the part and supporting roles are uniformly well played."

TV Guide wrote, "a superb performance from Attenborough is at the core of this character study."

The New York Times singled out Alun Falconer's "script, the tight direction by Don Chaffey, and the performances of the principals", and noted, "although they (the performances) do not make The Man Upstairs extraordinary, they give this modest effort the sheen of honesty and quality."

Leslie Halliwell said: "Character melodrama reminiscent of both Fourteen Hours [1951] and Le Jour se lève [1939], but not as interesting as either."

In British Sound Films: The Studio Years 1928–1959 David Quinlan rated the film as "very good", writing: "Nerve-wracking suspense is sensibly kept tight."

The Radio Times Guide to Films gave the film 3/5 stars, writing: "Le Jour Se Lève (1939) starred Jean Gabin as a killer who barricades himself in his attic flat. It was remade in 1947 as The Long Night with Henry Fonda, and this too is a remake, with Richard Attenborough going bonkers upstairs while the police downstairs try to calm him down. The motivation has changed (he blames himself for his fiancée's brother's death), but the dramatic set-up is identical and makes for some agreeable tension."
