= Skid Kids (film) =

1953 British film by Don Chaffey

- Opening titles
- Directed by: Don Chaffey
- Written by: Jack Howells
- Starring: Barry MacGregor
- Release date: February 1953
- Running time: 65 min.
- Country: United Kingdom
- Language: English

Skid Kids (also known as Bobby Rings the Bell) is a 1953 black and white British film directed by Don Chaffey and starring Barry MacGregor and Anthony Lang. It was produced by the Children's Film Foundation.

== Plot ==
The film centres on the Clarke family: Mr Clarke is a taxi driver and "Swanky" Clarke is his teenage son.

A group of young urban teenagers creates a cycle racing club called the Burton Bullets. They create a "speedway track" on local waste ground.

Meanwhile, a criminal gang is systematically stealing dozens of cycles in the same area. The police come to check the numerous bikes used by the club.

When Swanky's bike is stolen from outside a shop he gives chase and ends up being kidnapped. The club members try to track him down. Some of the missing bikes are spotted at Joe's and Joe starts throwing bikes in the canal to hide the evidence.

The police help the club and the bike thieves are caught.

== Cast ==
- Barry MacGregor as Swankey Clarke
- Anthony Lang as Bobby Reynolds
- Peter Neal as Police Constable
- Tom Walls Jr as Mr. Clarke
- Angela Monk as Sylvia Clarke
- Kurt Wagener as Antonio the sculptor
- Hilda Fenemore as Mrs Clarke
- Pauline Black (Maria)
- Trevor Hill (Peter Harrison)
- Judy Stephens (Sally Reynolds)
- Graham Stuart (Mr Johnson)
- Lance Campbell (Spike)
- Barry Phelps (Sam)
- A.E. Matthews (the man in the taxi)

== Production ==
The film was made in south-east London around the Ralph Street and Dickens Square area.

== Critical reception ==
The Monthly Film Bulletin wrote: "There is a freshness and vitality about this little film which compensate for its faults, which are obvious enough. The narrative is confused in places, the children's acting lacks spontaneity and is not helped by the dialogue, which fails to catch the authentic back-street flavour. The film shows signs of having been made in a hurry, and this, perhaps, was its salvation: the wilderness of south-east London offers not only a wonderfully varied and interesting background, but also, given a trick of light, a touch of mist or a cloud of dust from a skidding wheel on a bomb site, a beauty which the film has caught without the glamourisation usual in feature film photography of back-street locales. One feels that the makers of the film liked the place, just as they obviously enjoyed the cycle racing, the chases and the crowds of children round the track. The adults, with the exception of the fat and cheerful little Italian artist, are conventional and wooden. A. E. Matthews makes a fleeting guest appearance in the opening scene as an excitable fare in a taxi driven by the father of one of the team."

== See also ==
- List of films about bicycles and cycling
