= Bushey Studios =

British film studio

Coordinates: 51°38′38.64″N 0°21′32.54″W

Bushey Studios was a British film studio located in Melbourne Road, Bushey, Hertfordshire, which operated between 1913 and 1985. The studios were built by German-born painter and film pioneer Hubert von Herkomer in the grounds of his country house, Lululaund. They gradually became more professional and in 1915 they were acquired by the British Actors Film Company for use as their principal production base. After the company ran into problems, the studio was closed during much of the 1920s. During the 1930s film boom, it was re-opened and used to produce a number of quota quickies.

After the Second World War, the studios were used intermittently, generally to produce low-budget films such as the Tod Slaughter vehicle The Greed of William Hart (1948). In its later years, the studio produced documentaries and sex comedies before eventually closing. At the time of its closure, it was the oldest operational film studio in the world.

== Bibliography ==
- Warren, Patricia. British Film Studios: An Illustrated History. Batsford, 2001.
