= Patrick Barr =

English actor (1908–1985)

- Born: Patrick David Barr; 13 February 1908; Akola, Berar, British India
- Died: 29 August 1985 (aged 77); Wandsworth, London, England
- Occupation: Actor
- Years active: 1932–1985
- Spouse: Anne "Jean" Williams
- Children: Belinda Barr

Patrick David Barr (13 February 1908 – 29 August 1985) was an English actor. In his career spanning over half a century, he appeared in about 144 films and television series, including playing the role of Richard the Lionheart in the series Robin Hood starring Richard Greene.

== Biography ==
Born in Akola, British India, in 1908, Barr was educated at Radley College and Trinity College, Oxford, where he rowed in the 1929 Boat Race and achieved a Blue. He went from stage to screen with The Merry Men of Sherwood (1932). He spent the 1930s playing various beneficent authority figures and "reliable friend" types.

As a conscientious objector during the Second World War, Barr helped people in the Blitz in London's East End before serving with the Friends' Ambulance Unit in Africa. There he met his wife Anne "Jean" Williams, marrying her after ten days; it would have been sooner, but they needed permission from London.

In 1946, he picked up where he had left off, and in the early 1950s he began working in British television, attaining a popularity greater than he had while playing supporting parts in such films as The Case of the Frightened Lady (1940) and The Blue Lagoon (1949).

This popularity enabled Barr to obtain better roles and command a higher salary for his films of the 1950s and 1960s. Some of the films in which he appeared during this period were The Dam Busters (1955), Room in the House (1955), Saint Joan (1957), Next to Next Time (1960), Billy Liar (1963), The First Great Train Robbery (1979) and Octopussy (1983). On television, he appeared in Doctor Who in 1967 as Hobson in the serial entitled The Moonbase; in the 1970 Randall & Hopkirk (Deceased) episode "You Can Always Find a Fall Guy" and appeared once in The Avengers. In the 1981 BBC Radio 4 adaptation of The Lord of the Rings, Barr voiced the role of Gamling.

== Selected filmography ==
=== Film ===
- Meet My Sister (1933) – Bob Seymour
- Irish Hearts (1934) – Dr. Connellan
- Gay Old Dog (1935) – Phillip
- Things to Come (1936) – World Transport Official (uncredited)
- Wednesday's Luck (1936) – Jim Carfax
- East Meets West (1936) – O'Flaherty
- Midnight at Madame Tussaud's (1936) – Gerry Melville
- The Cavalier of the Streets (1937) – The Cavalier
- The Show Goes On (1937) – Designer
- The Return of the Scarlet Pimpernel (1937) – Lord Hastings
- Sunset in Vienna (1937) – Ludwig (uncredited)
- Sailing Along (1938) – Seaman at Birthday Party (uncredited)
- Incident in Shanghai (1938) – Pat Avon
- Star of the Circus (1938) – Truxa
- Meet Mr. Penny (1938) – Clive Roberts
- Yellow Sands (1938) – Arthur Varwell
- The Gaunt Stranger (1938) – Det. Insp. Alan Wembury
- Marigold (1938) – Lt. Archie Forsyth
- Let's Be Famous (1939) – John Blake
- Contraband (1940) – Undetermined Role (uncredited)
- The Case of the Frightened Lady (1940) – Richard Ferraby
- The Blue Lagoon (1949) – Second Mate
- Man on the Run (1949) – Detective at Cabby's Restaurant
- Adam and Evelyne (1949) – Bert – Adam's Friend (uncredited)
- Golden Arrow (1949) – Hedy's Husband
- To Have and to Hold (1951) – Brian
- The Lavender Hill Mob (1951) – Divisional Detective Inspector
- The Story of Robin Hood and His Merrie Men (1952) – King Richard
- Death of an Angel (1952) – Robert Welling
- You're Only Young Twice (1952) – Sir Archibald Asher
- King of the Underworld (1952) – Inspector John Morley
- Murder at Scotland Yard (1952) – Inspector John Morley
- Black Orchid (1953) – Vincent Humphries
- Sailor of the King (1953) – Capt. Tom Ashley, HMS 'Amesbury'
- I vinti (1953) – Ken Wharton
- The Intruder (1953) – Inspector Williams
- Black 13 (1953) – Robert
- Escape by Night (1953) – Insp. Frampton
- Duel in the Jungle (1954) – Supt. Roberts
- Seagulls Over Sorrento (1954) – Cmdr. Sinclair
- Time Is My Enemy (1954) – John Everton
- The Brain Machine (1955) – Dr. Geoffrey Allen
- The Dam Busters (1955) – Captain Joseph (Mutt) Summers, C.B.E.
- Room in the House (1955) – Jack Richards
- It's Never Too Late (1956) – Charles Hammond
- Saint Joan (1957) – Captain La Hire
- At the Stroke of Nine (1957) – Frank
- Lady of Vengeance (1957) – Inspector Madden
- Next to No Time (1958) – Jerry Lane
- Urge to Kill (1960) – Superintendent Allen
- The Valiant (1962) – Reverend Ellis
- The Longest Day (1962) – Group Captain James Stagg (uncredited)
- Billy Liar (1963) – Insp. MacDonald
- On the Run (1963) - Brent
- Ring of Spies (1964) – Captain Warner
- Last of the Long-haired Boys (1968) – Conyers
- Guns in the Heather (1969) – Lord Boyne
- The Flesh and Blood Show (1972) – Major Bell / Sir Arnold Gates
- The Satanic Rites of Dracula (1973) – Lord Carradine
- House of Whipcord (1974) – Justice Bailey
- The Black Windmill (1974) – Gen. St. John
- The First Great Train Robbery (1979) – Burke
- Home Before Midnight (1979) – The Judge
- Octopussy (1983) – British Ambassador

=== Television ===
- Inspector Morley: Late of Scotland Yard (1952, 7 episodes)
- Strange Experiences (1955) – Man (episode: "Fortune Teller")
- Doctor Who (1967) - Hobson (episode: "The Moonbase")
- The Mackinnons (1977) – Neil Turner
