= Frank Forsyth =

English actor (1905–1984)

- Publicity Photo of Frank Forsyth
- Born: 19 December 1905; London, England
- Died: 2 May 1984 (aged 78); Poole, Dorset
- Occupations: Film and television actor
- Years active: 1933–1980

Frank Forsyth (19 December 1905 – 2 May 1984), sometimes credited as Frank Forsythe, was an English actor, active from the 1930s. He was born on 19 December 1905 in London, England. He appeared in several TV programmes, including Department S (1969), The Adventures of Black Beauty (1972) and Journey to the Unknown (1968), as well as numerous films. His film appearances include eight of the Carry On films. He died on 2 May 1984 in Poole, England.

== Film and Television ==
- Dick Turpin (TV series – episode: "The Godmother") (1980) – Briggs
- The Naked Civil Servant (TV film) (1975) – Family Doctor
- Love Among the Ruins (TV film) (1975) – Jessop
- Craze (1974) – Man at Will Reading (uncredited)
- The Carnforth Practice (TV series) (1974) – Jury Foreman
- The Adventures of Black Beauty (TV series – episode: "The Challenge") (1973) – Old Tom
- Tales That Witness Madness (1973) – Uncle Albert (segment "Penny Farthing")
- And Now the Screaming Starts! (1973) – Servant
- The Vault of Horror (1973) – Male Customer (segment "Midnight Mess") (uncredited)
- Asylum (1972) – Asylum Gatekeeper (segment "Mannikins of Horror") (uncredited)
- Tales from the Crypt (1972) – Tramp (segment "Reflection of Death") (uncredited)
- Love Story (TV series – episode: "You Don't Know Me, But") (1972) – Commissionaire
- Z Cars (TV series – episode: "A Couple of Comic Turns: Part 1") (1970) – Night Porter
- Z Cars (TV series – episode: "A Couple of Comic Turns: Part 2") (1970) – Night Porter
- Z Cars (TV series – episode: "Contraband") (1962) – Inspector Dave Driver
- Carry On Again Doctor (1969) – Mr. Bean (uncredited)
- Department S (TV series – episode: "The Last Train to Redbridge") (1969) – Sawyer
- Department S (TV series – episode: "A Cellar Full of Silence") (1969) – Norman Fowler
- Oh! What a Lovely War (1969) – President Woodrow Wilson (uncredited)
- Dracula Has Risen from the Grave (1968) – Villager (uncredited)
- Journey to the Unknown (TV series – episode: "Eve" (1968) – Night Watchman
- Man in a Suitcase (TV series – episode: "Essay in Evil") (1967) – Lorry Driver
- Man in a Suitcase (TV series – episode: "Web with Four Spiders") (1968) –
- Man in a Suitcase (TV series – episode: "Which Way Did He Go, McGill?") (1968) – Steward
- They Came from Beyond Space (1967) – Blake
- The Terrornauts (1967) – Uncle
- The Forsyte Saga (TV series – episode: "Into the Dark") (1967) – Inspector Galloway
- The Stable Door (short) (1966) – Nightwatchman
- The Deadly Bees (1966) – Doctor
- Eye of the Devil (1966) – Guest at Harp Recital (uncredited)
- Carry On Screaming! (1966) – Desk Sergeant
- Crossroads (TV series – episode: #1.439) (1966) – Mr. Barling
- Crossroads (TV series – episode: #1.423) (1966) – Mr. Barling
- Crossroads (TV series – episode: #1.252) (1965) – Mr. Charlesworth
- The Psychopath (1965) – Tucker
- Game for Three Losers, (Edgar Wallace Mysteries), (1965) – Jimmy
- The Big Job (1965) – Bank Cashier
- The Skull (1965) – Judge
- The Troubleshooters (TV series – episode: "Young Turk") (1965) – Bajer
- Devils of Darkness (1965) – Antique Shop Caretaker
- Hysteria (1965) – Man Walking on Embankment (uncredited)
- "Man at the Carlton Tower", (Edgar Wallace Mysteries), (1961) – Commissionaire
- Dr. Terror's House of Horrors (1965) – Toastmaster (segment "Disembodied Hand") (uncredited)
- Traitor's Gate (1964) – Chief Yeoman Warden
- Blind Corner (1964) – Inspector
- Carry On Spying (1964) – Professor Stark
- The Evil of Frankenstein (1964) – Manservant (uncredited)
- Ring of Spies (1964) – Desk Sergeant (uncredited)
- Nightmare (1964) – Waiter (uncredited)
- Carry On Jack (1964) – Second Sealord
- Carry On Cabby (1963) – Chauffeur
- Richard the Lionheart (TV series – episode: "The Castle of Prince Otto") (1963) – Herald
- Walter and Connie (TV series – episode: "Walter and Connie Selling Books") (1963) – Police Sergeant (as Frank Forsythe)
- The Brain (1962) – Francis (uncredited)
- The Big Pull (TV series – episode: #1.3) (1962) – Supt. Teale
- Twice Round the Daffodils (1962) – Dorothy's Father
- Touch of Death (1961) – Local inspector
- What a Whopper (1961) – 3rd. Scot
- Raising the Wind (1961) – Prof. Gerald Abrahams
- Our Mister Ambler (TV series – episode: "Camera Obscura")
- One Way Pendulum (TV film) (1961) – Usher
- Three on a Spree (1961) – Barman
- Rag Doll (1961) – Superintendent
- Konga (1961) – General (uncredited)
- Jackpot (1960) – Desk Sergeant
- International Detective (TV series – episode: "The Rainis Case") (1960) – The Immigration Officer
- Circle of Deception (1960) – (uncredited)
- ITV Play of the Week (TV series – episode: "The Burning Glass") (1960) – Inspector Wigg
- The Vise (TV series – episode: "Black Pawn, White Pawn") (1960) – Webster
- The Young Jacobites (1960) – Laird
- Carry On Constable (1960) – Citizen
- No Hiding Place (TV series – episode: "The Final Chase" (1960) – Doctor
- No Hiding Place (TV series – episode: "A Genuine Sale of Murder") (1959) – Doctor
- No Hiding Place (TV series – episode: "Checkmate") (1959) – Doctor
- The Vise (TV series – episode: "Full Moon") (1959) – Doctor
- The Vise (TV series – episode: "Murder with Make-Up") (1959) – Scientist
- Glencannon (TV series – episode: "Scot from Scotland Yard") (1959) – The Inspector
- The Flying Doctor (TV series – episode: "A Call to London") (1959) – Police Sergeant
- Innocent Meeting (1959) – (uncredited)
- Horrors of the Black Museum (1959) – Postman (uncredited)
- Carry On Nurse (1959) – John Gray
- The Vise (TV series – episode: "Where There's a Will") (1958) – Surgeon
- The Vise (TV series – episode: "Six Months to Talk") (1958) – Doctor
- The Solitary Child (1958) – Doctor
- Chain of Events, (1958) – Johnson
- Television Playwright (TV series – episode: "Hour of the Rat") (1958) – Desmond Rogers
- Carry On Sergeant (1958) – Second Specialist
- Sunday Night Theatre (TV series – episode: "Witch Wood") (1954) – Thomas Spotswood
- Sunday Night Theatre (TV series – episode: "Queen Elizabeth Slept Here") (1956) – Clayton Shaw
- Sunday Night Theatre (TV series – episode: "The Frog") (1958) – Prison warder
- Print of Death, (Scotland Yard (film series)), (short) (1958) – Ballistics Expert (uncredited)
- Dunkirk (1958) – Small Boat Owner (uncredited)
- I Accuse! (1958) – Minister at President's Meeting (uncredited)
- Legal Action (TV film) (1958) – Police photographer
- Man from Tangier (1957) – Sgt. Irons
- The Surgeon's Knife (1957) – Anaesthetist
- The White Cliffs Mystery, (Scotland Yard (film series)) (short) (1957) – Forensic Investigator (uncredited)
- The Vicious Circle (1957) – Sgt. Wallace (uncredited)
- Kind Cousin (TV film) (1957) – Dr. Weston
- "The Case of 'The Smiling Widow", (Scotland Yard (film series), (1957) – Detective Jarvis (uncredited)
- The Man Without a Body (1957) – Detective
- The Lonely House (short) (1957) – Inspector Parry (as Frank Forsythe)
- "Person Unknown", (Scotland Yard (film series)), (short) (1956) – 2nd Pathologist (uncredited)
- Poison Pen (TV film) (1956) – Inspector Davies
- Circus Friends (1956) – Police Sergeant
- The Battle of the River Plate (1956) – Petty Officer, Bridge, HMS Ajax (uncredited)
- "Destination Death", (Scotland Yard (film series)), (short) (1956) – Police Officer (uncredited)
- Nom-de-Plume (TV series – episode: "The Free Air") (1956) – Monsieur Vincent (as Frank Forsythe)
- Nom-de-Plume (TV series – episode: "A Rough Diamond") (1956) – Doctor (as Frank Forsythe)
- The Door in the Wall (short) (1956) – Policeman (uncredited)
- Wicked as They Come (1956) – Jeweller (uncredited)
- Keep It Clean (1956) – Inspector at Court
- Fabian of the Yard (TV series – episode: "The Masterpiece") (1956) – Museum Custodian
- Fabian of the Yard (TV series – episode: "Cocktail Girl") (1956) – Museum Custodian
- Dial 999 (1955) – Policeman (uncredited)
- Stock Car (1955) – Detective Inspector Roberts
- No Smoking (1955) – 2nd Minister
- Stolen Assignment (1955) – Dr. Roberts
- Before I Wake (1955) – Jack Storey
- Tiger by the Tail (1954) – Sgt. Gross
- The Embezzler (1954) – Inspector Gale (as Frank Forsythe)
- The Scarlet Web (1954) – Jeweller (uncredited)
- Rheingold Theatre (TV series – episode: "Myra and the Moneyman") (1954) – First Gendarme
- The Diamond (1954) – P.C. with Taxi Driver (uncredited)
- Late Night Final, (Scotland Yard (film series), (short) (1954) – Constable Everitt
- Double Exposure, (1954) – Inspector Grayle (as Frank Forsythe)
- Escape by Night (1953) – Reporter (uncredited)
- The Silent Witness, (Scotland Yard (film series)), (short) (1953) – Detective Forbes
- 13 East Street (1952) – Prison Officer (uncredited)
- The Lavender Hill Mob (1951) – Minor Role (uncredited)
- Pool of London (1951) – Police Constable Witnessing Robbery (uncredited)
- Midnight Episode (1950) – Police Officer (uncredited)
- Treasures in Heaven (TV film) (1950) – Sid, the Barman
- The Case of Charles Peace (1949) – Police Training Instructor (uncredited)
- Kid Flanagan (TV film) (1948) – Chris Richards (as Frank Forsythe)
- The Dark Road (1948) – Detective
- The Middle Watch (TV film) (1948) – Corporal Duckett, RM (as Frank Forsythe)
- Goofer Trouble (short) (1940) – Black
- Dusty Ermine (1936) – Radio Operator (uncredited)
- The Good Companions (1933)
