= Sally Douglas =

British actress (1941–2001)

- Born: 30 November 1941; Lancashire, England
- Died: 1 September 2001 (aged 59)
- Occupation: Actress
- Years active: 1960–1971

Sally Douglas (30 November 1941 – 1 September 2001) was a British supporting actress of the 1960s and 1970s. She died in September 2001 at the age of 59 from cancer.

She appeared in many notable films and television series. Comedy film credits include six of the Carry On series and Tony Hancock's satire The Rebel. She appeared, too, in Michael Reeves' Witchfinder General, voted in 2005 the fifteenth greatest horror film of all time. TV credits include Danger Man, Dad's Army (1969), On the Buses (1969–1970) and as Marlene, an erotic dancer in the third episode of the second series of Doctor in the House: Take Your Clothes Off and Hide. In 1969, Douglas was cast in On the Buses as the bus clippie Susie. Douglas was the cousin of the television personality Stephanie Turner.

== Selected filmography ==
- Doctor in Love (1960) — Dancer in Strip Show (uncredited)
- Sands of the Desert (1960) — Harem Girl (uncredited)
- The Pure Hell of St Trinian's (1960) — Harem Girl (uncredited)
- The Rebel (1961) — Jim Smith Acolyte (uncredited)
- A Weekend with Lulu (1961) — (uncredited)
- Village of Daughters (1962) — Glamorous Daughter in Crowd (uncredited)
- In the Doghouse (1962) — Hairdresser (uncredited)
- Carry On Jack (1963) — Girl at Dirty Dick's (uncredited)
- The Sicilians (1963) — O'Leary's secretary
- Carry On Spying (1964) — Amazon Guard (uncredited)
- The Beauty Jungle (1964) — Beauty Contestant (uncredited)
- Carry On Cleo (1964) — Antony's Dusky Maiden (uncredited)
- Joey Boy (1965) — Girl Dancing in Club (uncredited)
- The Intelligence Men (1965) — Girl (uncredited)
- Genghis Khan (1965) — Concubine
- The Alphabet Murders (1965) — Glamorous Girl in Gaming Club (uncredited)
- A Study in Terror (1965) — Whore in Pub (uncredited)
- Carry On Cowboy (1965) — Kitikata
- That Riviera Touch (1966) — Lady at Casino (uncredited)
- Carry On Screaming! (1966) — Girl
- Mister Ten Per Cent (1967) — Glamorous Girl at Theatre Party (uncredited)
- Carry On Follow That Camel (1967) — Harem Girl (uncredited)
- Witchfinder General (1968) — Girl at Inn
- The Assassination Bureau (1969) — 'La Belle Amie' Girl (uncredited)
- Can Heironymus Merkin Ever Forget Mercy Humppe and Find True Happiness? (1969) — Automation Bunny
- War Dance (Dad's Army) (1969) - Blodwen
- Up Pompeii (1971) — Titta (uncredited) (final film role)
