= No Trees in the Street =

1959 British film by J. Lee Thompson

- Directed by: J. Lee Thompson
- Written by: Ted Willis
- Produced by: Frank Godwin; J. Lee Thompson; Ted Willis
- Starring: Sylvia Syms; Herbert Lom; Ronald Howard; Stanley Holloway; Joan Miller; Melvyn Hayes
- Cinematography: Gilbert Taylor
- Edited by: Richard Best
- Music by: Laurie Johnson
- Production company: Associated British Picture Corporation
- Distributed by: Associated British-Pathé (UK), Seven Arts (US)
- Release dates: 1959 (UK); 1964 (US)
- Running time: 96 minutes
- Country: United Kingdom
- Language: English

No Trees in the Street is a 1959 British crime thriller directed by J. Lee Thompson and starring Sylvia Syms, Herbert Lom and Melvyn Hayes. It was written by Ted Willis, from his 1948 stage play of the same name.

The film is set in the slums of London, and depicts the life of impoverished teenager Tommy, who becomes a criminal in an attempt at social mobility.

It is an example of British kitchen sink realism, but is mainly noted for its naturalistic depiction of slum life.

== Plot ==
Initially, the film's story is told by Frank, a local plainclothes policeman in love with Hett, to a young tearaway Kenny.

In the slums of London before World War II, Tommy is an aimless teenager who tries to escape his squalid surroundings by entering a life of crime. He falls in with local racketeer Wilkie, who holds the rest of the slum citizens – including Tommy's own family – in a grip of fear. For a brief period, Hetty (Tommy's older sister) becomes Wilkie's girlfriend until he humiliates her in front of the other slum citizens simply to show his power over them, after which she will have nothing to do with Wilkie despite him repeatedly asking her to come back to him.

The film chronicles Tommy's sordid progression from minor thefts to murder.

At the end of the film, Hetty and Frank are seen to be married and living in a new council flat long after the slums have been demolished.

== Cast ==
- Sylvia Syms as Hetty
- Herbert Lom as Wilkie
- Melvyn Hayes as Tommy
- Ronald Howard as Frank
- Stanley Holloway as Kipper
- Joan Miller as Jess
- Liam Redmond as Bill
- David Hemmings as Kenny
- Carole Lesley as Lova
- Lily Kann as Mrs Jacobson
- Lloyd Lamble as Superintendent
- Campbell Singer as Inspector
- Marianne Stone as Mrs. Jokel
- Rita Webb as Mrs. Brown
- Lana Morris as Marje

== Production ==
Willis wrote "Loosely based on characters I'd met in childhood in the dingy back streets of Tottenham, I think I wrote it to exorcise certain ghosts."

Filming began 10 March 1958. The film was revised after previews, with new scenes added at the opening, and at the end showing the detective and the sister married. According to Willis, a small role was given to the mistress of a key executive at Associated British.

Willis, Thompson and Syms had previously collaborated on Woman in a Dressing Gown (1957) and Ice Cold in Alex (1958). According to Willis, Associated British agreed to finance the film but only if any profits made from Woman in a Dressing Gown were held back to offset losses on No Trees in the Street.

== Box office ==
According to Willis, the film "did not match the success of Woman in a Dressing Gown. It was a decent little film and did quite well but the melodramatic faults which were present in my stage original seemed to be even more obvious on the screen. It took a long time to recover its costs and I waited two or three years before I was paid the deferred part of my fee. And my total share of profit from these two pictures, which arrived in dribs and drabs over the next ten years, was under a thousand pounds."

== Critical reception ==
Monthly Film Bulletin said "Gingerly adapted by Ted Willis from his own play, and enclosed in a flash-back to twenty years ago, this problem picture about London slum life suffers from all the faults of the original and has none of its virtues. The play's vital structural power has been lost, possibly because of censorship difficultics, and with it all honesty and credibility of characterisation. Nothing remains but crude sensationalism and several moments of unconscious humour. Lee-Thompson's direction is hysterical, the playing is pitched throughout on a level of pathetic desperation, and Gilbert Taylor's photography conveys an unrelieved drabness which is the film's only concession to reality."

Variety wrote "Ted Willis is a writer with a sympathetic eye for problems of the middle and lower classes ... Syms gives a moving performance as the gentle girl who refuses to marry the cheap racketeer just to escape. Lom, as the opportunist who dominates the street, is sufficiently suave and unpleasant."

In British Sound Films: The Studio Years 1928–1959 David Quinlan rated the film as "mediocre", writing: "Good play gone wrong on screen; direction and most of the performances take it right over the top."

TV Guide wrote "[the film] suffers from artificiality of plot and dialog. Characterizations are reduced to mere stereotypes...There are some notable exceptions within the drama, however. Syms is surprisingly moving, giving a sensitive performance despite the film's constraints. Holloway's characterization of a bookie's tout is comical and charming ... The camerawork attempts a realistic documentary look, which manages to succeed in capturing the details of slum life that make the setting seem surprisingly naturalistic. The finer points of the film, however, are overshadowed by its faults."

Time Out wrote "released at a time when kitchen sink drama was all the rage, this is an unremarkable 'we had it tough' chronicle from another age."

Leslie Halliwell said: "Artificial and unconvincing attempt at a London Love on the Dole [1941], dragged up and redigested in a later era when 'realism' was thought to be fashionable."

The Radio Times Guide to Films gave the film 2/5 stars, writing: "Although a stalwart of stage and TV, screenwriter Ted Willis worked less in movies and it rather shows in this ludicrously sentimental adaptation of his own play. It was unlucky enough to be released in the same year that British cinema entered its great "kitchen sink" phase, but this thin-cut slice of street life could never feel anything but stale. Herbert Lom tries to inject a little menace as a small-time hoodlum, but, confronted with sickly sweet Sylvia Syms and teen tearaway Melvyn Hayes, he succumbs to the mediocrity."
