= There Is No Escape =

There is No Escape
- Directed by: Alfred J. Goulding
- Based on: the life story of jewel thief Stanley Thurston
- Produced by: Henry Halsted
- Starring: Stanley Thurston (credited as "Charles Stuart"); Joyce Linden; Michael Ripper
- Cinematography: Stanley Clinton; Reg Selley
- Music by: John Bath
- Production companies: Hammer Films; Marylebone Production
- Distributed by: Exclusive Films (UK); Screen Guild Productions (US)
- Release date: 1 October 1948
- Running time: 72 minutes
- Country: United Kingdom
- Language: English
- Budget: £20,000

There is No Escape (also known as The Dark Road and The Thurston Story) is a 1948 British second feature ('B') drama film directed by Alfred J. Goulding and starring Farnham Baxter, Cyril Chamberlain, Sydney Bromley and Stanley Thurston (credited as Charles Stewart). It was produced by Henry Halstead for Hammer Films. The film features an early appearance from Peter Reynolds, and was Michael Ripper's first appearance in a Hammer Film.

== Plot ==
A crime novelist named Nick Allen is assigned to write the true life story of a petty criminal named Sidney Robertson. Robertson was recently killed falling off a building while fleeing the police during a jewel theft. Allen's book traces the story of the criminal who started a life of crime at a very young age and kept falling in with the wrong crowd all his life. At one point, Robertson was sentenced to prison for seven years, but later managed to escape. Reuniting with an old girlfriend named Anne, he is lured into committing a jewel robbery, which leads to his death.

== Cast ==
- Stanley Thurston as Sidney Robertson (billed here as Charles Stuart)
- Joyce Linden as Anne
- Farnham Baxter as writer Nick Allen
- Cyril Chamberlain as the editor
- Sydney Bromley as Professor Corkew
- Gale Douglas
- Veronica Rose
- Michael Ripper as Andy Anderson
- Mackenzie Ward as Ashcroft
- Patricia Hicks
- Roddy Hughes as the chaplain
- Anthony Holles as head waiter
- David Keir as Mr Jones
- Frank Forsyth as detective
- Rory MacDermot as P.C. Davidson
- Joanna Carter
- Peter Reynolds
- Maxine Taylor
- Sefton Yates
- Gerald Pring
- Hay Petrie

== Production ==
The film was based on the career of criminal Stanley Thurston, who appeared in the cast as a character based on himself. Thurston was famous for his numerous escapes from prison, 5 times in 15 years. He was released from prison in October 1946. The film had trouble with the British censors who thought the film glamorised a real life criminal. Thurston had to be billed as "Charles Stuart."

James Carreras said, "The picture already has official police approval. I have done everything to show that crime is a mug's game. Thurston is the only non-professional actor in the film. All he asked was £10 a week to cover expenses. At the end of the film he turns to the audience and tells them that a criminal life just isn't worth the candle, especially when guns are brought into crime. He made such a good job of the picture that I had him listed for a racing story on his merits as an actor. That plan will now have to be shelved."

The film was shot at Marylebone Studios.

== Reception ==
The Monthly Film Bulletin wrote: "The film closes with the controversial moralisation that crime cannot pay; it is poorly contrived, and the irresponsible direction and bad editing merely serve to make matters worse. With some twenty minutes' unnecessary footage pruned away the film might become mediocre second-feature entertainment, but in its present state it does not deserve serious criticism."

Kine Weekly wrote: "'Crime does not pay' melodrama, illustrating the story submitted to the editor of an American thriller magazine. Its object is apparently to prove that honesty is the best policy, but amateurish acting, uneven direction and a dishevelled script prevent it from underlining its message with exciting, let alone plausible, 'thick ear.' Indifferent quota."
