= Martin Wyldeck =

British actor (1914–1988)

- in Doctor in Love
- Born: 11 January 1914; Warwickshire, England
- Died: 29 April 1988 (aged 74); Exeter, Devon, England
- Occupation: Actor

Martin Wyldeck (11 January 1914 – 29 April 1988) was an English actor who played a wide range of parts over many years on stage, screen and TV. He also appeared in the first episode of the TV series Fawlty Towers, as Sir Richard Morris.

== Selected filmography ==
- Operation Diamond (1948) – Hugo
- My Wife's Lodger (1952) – Policeman
- Time Bomb (1953) – Sergeant Collins
- Deadly Nightshade (1953) – M.I.5 Man (uncredited)
- Street Corner (1953) – Desk Sgt. Forbes (uncredited)
- Will Any Gentleman...? (1953) – Commissionaire
- Knights of the Round Table (1953) – John (uncredited)
- The Embezzler (1954) – 2nd Police Sergeant (uncredited)
- Timeslip (1955) – Dr. Preston
- Now and Forever (1956) – Master of Ceremonies (uncredited)
- My Wife's Family (1956) – (uncredited)
- The Counterfeit Plan (1957) – (uncredited)
- The Devil's Pass (1957) – Young Master
- The Hypnotist (1957) – Doctor Bradford
- Carry On Sergeant (1958) – Mr. Sage (uncredited)
- Chain of Events (1958) – Becket
- Just Joe (1960) – Bill
- Doctor in Love (1960) – Police Officer (uncredited)
- A Story of David (1961) – Hezro
- The Frightened City (1961) – Security Officer
- Fate Takes a Hand (1961) – Doctor
- The Pot Carriers (1962) – Prison Officer Mullins
- The Girl on the Boat (1962) – J.P. Mortimer
- Heart to Heart (1962) – Cyril Browne
- That Kind of Girl (1963) – Bates
- Night Must Fall (1964) – Inspector Willett
- The Return of Mr. Moto (1965) – Helmuth 'Dargo' Engel
- Robbery (1967) – Chief constable
- The Oblong Box (1969) – Constable
- The Bushbaby (1969) – Captain
- Cool It Carol! (1970) – Mr. Thatcher
- A Touch of the Other (1970) – Traylor
- Die Screaming, Marianne (1971) – British Police Detective – Grey Hair
- Universal Soldier (1972) – Wilson
- Four Dimensions of Greta (1972) – Herr Schickler
- Tiffany Jones (1973) – Brodsky
- Boys from the Blackstuff (1982) – Marley
