= Operation Bullshine =

- Original film poster
- Directed by: Gilbert Gunn
- Written by: Anne Burnaby; Rupert Lang; Gilbert Gunn
- Produced by: Frank Godwin
- Starring: Donald Sinden; Barbara Murray; Carole Lesley
- Cinematography: Gilbert Taylor
- Edited by: Edward B. Jarvis
- Music by: Laurie Johnson
- Production company: Associated British Picture Corporation
- Distributed by: Associated British-Pathé
- Release date: 30 June 1959
- Running time: 84 mins.
- Country: United Kingdom
- Language: English

Operation Bullshine is a 1959 British colour comedy film directed by Gilbert Gunn and starring Donald Sinden, Barbara Murray and Carole Lesley. The working title of the film was Girls in Arms that features as a marching song in the film. Gunn had filmed Girls at Sea the previous year. The new title, based on an American euphemism for a very British word with the same meaning (bullshite), comes from the frenzied activity preparing for their brigadier's surprise inspection. The film features 1956 Olympic gold medallist Judy Grinham as a physical training instructor.

The film was later also released in the US in 1963 by Seven Arts Productions.

== Plot ==
During World War II, a Royal Artillery officer is assigned to an anti-aircraft battery that is filled with female soldiers of the Auxiliary Territorial Service. His wife who has enlisted is mistakenly posted to the battery in violation of regulations of husbands and wives serving together in the same formation. She becomes jealous of what she perceives as his paying too much attention to the other Auxiliary Territorial Service women.

Lt Brown is encouraged to take time off with his wife. He does not get word to her but through various circumstances is nevertheless tracked down by her on the train home. However Gunner White has also tracked him down and arrives at his house. The major arrives for a visit soon after and chaos ensues.

Back at camp all areas are tidied in readiness for a visit from the brigadier. The brigadier is impressed but the visit is ruined when they discover Mr and Mrs Brown kissing in the kitchen. However, at the point of reprimand, a siren sounds, warning of the approach of a German aeroplane. They man the anti-aircraft gun and shoot it down. The pilot parachutes down and is pleased to be captured by the all-female force.

== Cast ==
- Donald Sinden - Lieutenant Gordon Brown
- Barbara Murray - Private Betty Brown
- Carole Lesley - Private Marge White
- Ronald Shiner - Gunner Slocum
- Naunton Wayne - Major Pym
- Dora Bryan - Private Cox
- John Cairney - Gunner Willie Ross
- Fabia Drake - Junior Commander Maddox A.T.S.
- Joan Rice - Private Finch
- Daniel Massey - Bombardier Peter Palmer
- Peter Jones - Gunner Perkins
- Barbara Hicks - Sergeant Merrifield
- John Welsh - Brigadier
- Judy Grinham - P.T. Instructress
- Cyril Chamberlain - Orderly Sergeant
- Ambrosine Phillpotts - Reporter
- Naomi Chance as Subaltern Godfrey A.T.S.
- Marianne Stone as Sergeant Cook
- Harry Landis as Gunner Wilkinson
- Julie Alexander as A.T.S. Girl
- Dorinda Stevens as A.T.S. Girl
- Amanda Barrie as A.T.S. Girl

== Production ==
Donald Sinden wrote in his memoirs:

A rather good comedy script on the subject of the ATS, with the ambiguous title of Girls in Arms, was my next assignment. Many of my scenes were with my batman and I was not overjoyed when they told me that the part was to be played by Ronald Shiner: a nice enough chap but his comedy playing was of the broadest: there would be no chance of anything subtle. My heart sank even further when the title was changed to Operation Bullshine. Apart from working with some splendid actors such as Barbara Murray and Naunton Wayne it was a fairly joyless experience.

== Reception ==
Operation Bullshine was the tenth most popular film at the British box office in 1959. According to Kinematograph Weekly the film performed "better than average" at the British box office in 1959. Variety also said this.
