= Cyril Chamberlain =

English actor (1909–1974)

- in The Green Man (1956)
- Born: 8 March 1909; London, England
- Died: 30 April 1974 (aged 65); Builth Wells, Wales
- Other name: C. J. Chamberlain
- Occupation: Actor
- Years active: 1938–1966

Cyril Chamberlain (8 March 1909 – 30 April 1974) was an English film and television actor. He appeared in a number (the first seven) of the early Carry On, Doctor and St. Trinian's films.

Chamberlain's first film appearance was in the 1936 Michael Powell drama film The Man Behind the Mask his role was uncredited. He later appeared as the main villain in both the crime drama The Embezzler (1954) and the crime thriller Tiger by the Tail (1954).

== Personal life ==
Chamberlain was born on 8 March 1909 in London and died in Builth Wells in Wales on 30 April 1974 aged 65. He spent his final five years in retirement restoring antique furniture.

He was married to actress Lisa Lee and they had one child.

== Partial filmography ==
- Crackerjack (1938) Bit Role (uncredited)
- Stolen Life (1939) (uncredited)
- Dead Men are Dangerous (1939) as George Franklin (uncredited)
- The Spy in Black (1939) Bit Part (uncredited)
- Ask a Policeman (1939) as Radio Announcer (uncredited)
- This Man in Paris (1939) as Swindon
- Poison Pen (1939) as Peter Cashelton
- What Would You Do, Chums? (1939) as Mike Collins
- The Body Vanished (1939) as Auctioneer
- Return to Yesterday (1940) Bit Part (uncredited)
- Jailbirds (1940) as Bob
- Old Mother Riley in Society (1940)
- Spare a Copper (1940) as Policeman (uncredited)
- Old Mother Riley in Business (1941) as John Halliwell
- Crook's Tour (1941) as American (uncredited)
- He Found a Star (1941) as Louie
- The Common Touch (1941) as Jenkins (uncredited)
- The Black Sheep of Whitehall (1942) as BBC Producer (uncredited)
- The Big Blockade (1942) as Press
- The Man Within (1947) as Runner, Court clark
- The Upturned Glass (1947) as Junior Doctor
- Dancing with Crime (1947) as Sniffy
- Brighton Rock (1947) as Detective (uncredited)
- Night Beat (1947) as PC Rix (uncredited)
- The Calendar (1948) as Customs Official
- My Brother's Keeper (1948) as Archer (uncredited)
- London Belongs to Me (1948) as Detective Sergeant Wilson
- The Blind Goddess (1948) as Policeman in Park
- Quartet (1948) as Reporter (segment "The Kite")
- Here Come the Huggetts (1948) as Policeman at Crash Site (uncredited)
- Once a Jolly Swagman (1949) as Reporter
- Portrait from Life (1949) as Supervisor
- It's Not Cricket (1949) as MP No. 2
- The Bad Lord Byron (1949) as Defending Counsel
- The Huggetts Abroad (1949) as Hopkinson (uncredited)
- A Boy, a Girl and a Bike (1949) as Bert Gardner
- Stop Press Girl (1949) as Johnnie
- Marry Me (1949) as P.C. Jackson
- Whisky Galore! (1949) Bit Part (uncredited)
- Don't Ever Leave Me (1949) as News Reporter
- Helter Skelter (1949) Bit Part (uncredited)
- The Chiltern Hundreds (1949) as Sentry
- Boys in Brown (1949) as Mr. Johnson
- Stage Fright (1950) as Detective Sgt. Loomis (uncredited)
- Tony Draws a Horse (1950) Minor Role (uncredited)
- Waterfront (1950) as Reporter (uncredited)
- The Clouded Yellow (1950) as Passport Official (uncredited)
- Blackmailed (1951) as Police Constable
- The Adventures (1951) as Waiter
- Scarlet Thread (1951) as Mason
- The Lavender Hill Mob (1951) as Commander
- Lady Godiva Rides Again (1951) as Harry
- Old Mother Riley's Jungle Treasure (1952) as Capt. Daincourt
- Sing Along with Me (1952) as Jack Bates
- Escape Route (1952) as Bailey (uncredited)
- Folly to Be Wise (1953) as Drill Sergeant
- The Net (1953) as Insp. Carter
- Deadly Nightshade (1953) Bit Part (uncredited)
- Innocents in Paris (1953) Bit Part (uncredited)
- A Day to Remember (1953) as Boarding Card Official on Ferry (uncredited)
- Stand by to Shoot (1953) as Jamieson White (six-part t.v.series)
- Trouble in Store (1953) as Alf
- Impulse (1954) as Gray
- Hell Below Zero (1954) as Factory Ship Radio Operator
- You Know What Sailors Are (1954) as Stores Officer
- Doctor in the House (1954) as Policeman
- The Diamond (1954) as Castle
- Forbidden Cargo (1954) as Customs Officer (uncredited)
- The Embezzler (1954) as Alec Johnson
- Companions in Crime (1954)
- Up to His Neck (1955) as Walter (uncredited)
- Raising a Riot (1955) as Policeman (uncredited)
- Above Us the Waves (1955) as CPO Chubb
- Doctor at Sea (1955) as Whimble
- Value for Money (1955) as Hotel Manager (uncredited)
- Tiger by the Tail (1955) as C.A. Foster
- Simon and Laura (1955) as Bert
- Man of the Moment (1955) as British Delegate
- Dial 999 (1955) as Anderson (murder victim)
- An Alligator Named Daisy (1955) as Party Guest (uncredited)
- Windfall (1955) as Clarkson
- The Gamma People (1956) as Graf
- Lost (1956) as Uniformed Police Officer (uncredited)
- Private's Progress (1956) Bit Part (uncredited)
- The Iron Petticoat (1956) as Hotel Doorman (uncredited)
- Eyewitness (1956) as Cinema Patron (uncredited)
- The Green Man (1956) as Sergeant Bassett
- Up in the World (1957) as Harper
- Doctor at Large (1957) as Police Constable (uncredited)
- The Tommy Steele Story (1957) as Chief Steward
- The Prince and the Showgirl (1957) Bit Part (uncredited)
- Miracle in Soho (1957) as Policeman (uncredited)
- No Time for Tears (1957) as Hall Porter
- After the Ball (1957) as Villiers
- Just My Luck (1957) as Goodwood Official
- The One That Got Away (1957) as Sergeant 'Later' (uncredited)
- Blue Murder at St Trinian's (1957) as Captain
- The Man Who Wouldn't Talk (1958) as Liftman (uncredited)
- Innocent Sinners (1958) as Col. Francis Baldock (uncredited)
- The Duke Wore Jeans (1958) as Barman
- Wonderful Things! (1958) as Butler
- The Big Money (1958) as Detective at Hotel (uncredited)
- A Night to Remember (1958) as Quartermaster George Thomas Rowe
- Man with a Gun (1958) as Supt. Wood
- Carry On Sergeant (1958) as Gun Sergeant
- Chain of Events (1958) as Bus Conductor
- The Heart of a Man (1959) as Boxing MC (uncredited)
- Too Many Crooks (1959) as Chief Fire Officer (uncredited)
- Carry On Nurse (1959) as Bert Able
- Operation Bullshine (1959) as Orderly Sergeant
- The Ugly Duckling (1959) as Police Sergeant
- Carry On Teacher (1959) as Alf Hudson
- Upstairs and Downstairs (1959) as Guard
- Please Turn Over (1959) as Mr. Jones
- Two-Way Stretch (1960) as Gate Warder (Day)
- Carry On Constable (1960) as Thurston
- Doctor in Love (1960) Bit Part (uncredited)
- The Bulldog Breed (1960) as Jimmy the Landlord (uncredited)
- The Pure Hell of St Trinian's (1960) as Army Captain
- No Kidding (1961) as Cafe proprietor
- Carry On Regardless (1961) as Policeman
- Nearly a Nasty Accident (1961) as Warr. Off. Breech
- Dentist on the Job (1961) as Director
- Flame in the Streets (1961) as Dowell
- Raising the Wind (1961) as L.A.M.A. Porter
- A Pair of Briefs (1962) as Policeman (uncredited)
- Carry On Cruising (1962) as Tom Tree, Steward
- The Iron Maiden (1962) as Mrs. Webb's teammate
- On the Beat (1962) as Cafe Proprietor (uncredited)
- The Human Jungle (20 April 1963,10:05 pm):ABC T.V.: Uncredited car polisher:'Thin Ice' Episode
- Two Left Feet (1963) as Miles
- Carry On Cabby (1963) as Sarge
- A Stitch in Time (1963) Bit Part (uncredited)
- Ring of Spies (1964) as Anderson
- Joey Boy (1965) as Lt. James Ridley (uncredited)
- Sky West and Crooked (1966) as Hubberd
- The Great St. Trinian's Train Robbery (1966) as Maxie
- The Yellow Hat (1966) Bit Part (Uncredited) (final film role)
