= Richard Best (film editor) =

English film editor

- Born: 28 June 1916; Kingston upon Hull, England, United Kingdom of Great Britain and Ireland
- Died: 19 December 2004 (aged 88); Ickenham, England, UK
- Occupations: Film editor and film director
- Years active: 1947–1982
- Spouse: Noreen Ackland (1956–2004)

Richard Best (28 June 1916 – 19 December 2004) was a British film editor and television editor. He had about 50 feature film credits, and also edited the 1965-66 season of the television series The Avengers. He is known particularly for three films: The Dam Busters (1955), Ice Cold in Alex (1958), and Look Back in Anger (1959), as well as for his long collaboration with director J. Lee Thompson.

== Selected filmography ==
=== Feature films ===
- Fame is the Spur (Boulting-1947)
- The Guinea Pig (Boulting-1948)
- The Dancing Years (French-1950). The first of thirty-three films from Associated British Picture Corporation (ABPC) that Best edited.
- The Magic Box (Boulting-1951)
- Elstree Story (Gunn-1952(
- The Yellow Balloon (Thompson-1953)
- The Weak and the Wicked (Thompson-1954). Released as Young and Willing in the U.S..
- The Dam Busters (Anderson-1955). Film cited in 1999 as one of the hundred best British films. Kevin Brownlow considers it to be the epitome of Best's work, "The Dam Busters was exceptionally well cut. ... Robert Wise's The Haunting (1963) is supposed to be the first film to use direct cuts between sequences, and to dispense with fades and dissolves, but The Dam Busters experimented with this a decade earlier. ... the climax, a tremendous juggling job, was largely invented by him. Despite some unconvincing special effects, the bombing runs were impeccably timed and one still watches the sequence with astonishment."
- Now and Forever (Zampi-1956)
- Yield to the Night (Thompson-1956). Also released as Blonde Sinner in the U.S..
- The Silken Affair (Kellino-1956)
- Woman in a Dressing Gown (Thompson-1957)
- The Moonraker (MacDonald-1958)
- Ice Cold in Alex (Thompson-1958). Best's personal favorite among the films he edited. Released in North America as Desert Attack.
- No Trees in the Street (Thompson-1959)
- Look Back in Anger (Richardson-1959). Although noted as an early British New Wave film, Best himself disliked it.
- Bottoms Up (Zampi-1960)
- School for Scoundrels (Hamer-1960). A tennis match in this film is used to illustrate the editing of comedy in the text The Editor's Toolkit: A Hands-On Guide to the Craft of Film and TV Editing.
- Sands of the Desert (Carstairs-1960)
- The Rebel (Day-1961). Also released in the U.S. as Call Me Genius.
- Go to Blazes (Truman-1962)
- The Cracksman (Scott-1963)
- The Bargee (Wood-1964)
- Otley (Clement-1968)
- The Most Dangerous Man in the World (Thompson-1969). Released in the U.S. as The Chairman.
- The Blood on Satan's Claw (Haggard-1970)
- Please Sir! (Stuart-1971)
- Dominique (Anderson-1978)

=== Documentaries and shorts ===
From 1977 to 1982, Best edited documentary and short films produced by British Transport Films (BTF).

- Robbie (Dunkley-1979)
- Promises, Promises (Tambling-1982).

== See also ==
- List of film director and editor collaborations - Best edited seven films with director J. Lee Thompson. Six of them were made in the first, English phase of Thompson's directing career. This phase ended with his 1961 move to the U.S.. Thompson and Best collaborated once more on The Most Dangerous Man in the World (1969).
