= Jimmy Thompson (actor) =

English actor, writer and director (1925–2005)

- Born: James Edward Thompson; 30 October 1925; Halifax, West Riding of Yorkshire, England
- Died: 21 April 2005 (aged 79); York, England
- Education: St Peter's School, York
- Occupations: actor, writer, director
- Known for: Liberace impersonation
- Spouse: Nina (d.1999)

James Edward Thompson (30 October 1925 – 21 April 2005) was an English actor, writer and director.

== Biography ==
He was born 30 October 1925 in Halifax, West Riding of Yorkshire and educated at St. Peter's School in York. As a young man he began his career in repertory theatre in Yorkshire and he toured with a theatrical company headed by Jean Forbes-Robertson.

After his national service, he moved to London, and his early appearances on the West End stage were in intimate revue.

In 1956, he became known for his impersonation of the American pianist and entertainer, Liberace, in the revue, For Amusement Only, at the Apollo Theatre. Thompson was called in the 1959 libel action brought by the pianist against the Daily Mirror, and was himself subsequently sued by Liberace. Thompson settled out of court, making a donation to an actors’ charity.

In 1959, he and his wife, Nina, co-authored a musical comedy, The Quiz Kid, which was presented at the Lyric Theatre, Hammersmith. In 1964, he starred in Monsieur Blaise at the Royal Court and Phoenix theatres, a play adapted by his wife from the Claude Magnier farce. In 1974, Thompson starred in The Englishman Amused at the Young Vic, a production which again he co-wrote with his wife. In 1992, he was once more in revue, appearing at the Whitehall Theatre in Spread a Little Happiness, the Vivian Ellis musical. In the 1960s, Thompson appeared regularly in the BBC television programme, Pinky and Perky, created by Jan and Vlasta Dalibor. In 1967, he starred in the title role in the first BBC2 play in colour, Lieutenant Tenant. Other television appearances included The Benny Hill Show (1970) and George and Mildred (1978).

His film appearances include Carry On Regardless (1961), Carry On Cruising (1962), Band of Thieves (1962) (where he had one of the main roles) and Those Magnificent Men in Their Flying Machines (1965).

His directorial credits include directing Simon Ward in Perchance to Dream, Patrick Cargill in Don't Misunderstand Me, Mollie Sugden in My Giddy Aunt, Windsor Davies in My Wife Whatsername, Peggy Mount in Blithe Spirit, and the original production of Jeeves Takes Charge with Edward Duke.

After the death of his wife in 1999, he retired to York where he died on 21 April 2005.

== Filmography ==
Year	Title	Role	Notes
1958	The Whole Truth	Assistant	
1959	The Man Who Liked Funerals	Lt. Hunter	
1960	Doctor in Love	Doctor	Uncredited
1961	No Love for Johnnie	Sheilah's Party Guest	Uncredited
1961	Carry On Regardless	Mr. Delling	
1961	Raising the Wind	Alex Spendlove	
1962	Carry On Cruising	Sam Turner, Barman	
1962	Band of Thieves	Hon. Derek Delaney	
1964	Carry On Jack	Adm. Horatio Nelson	
1965	Those Magnificent Men in Their Flying Machines	Photographer	
1968	Hot Millions	Salesman	Uncredited
1970	Doctor in Trouble	Ship's Doctor	
1973	U-Turn	Old ferry driver	
