= The Embezzler (1954 film) =

1954 British film by John Gilling

- UK theatrical poster
- Directed by: John Gilling
- Screenplay by: John Gilling
- Produced by: Robert S. Baker; Monty Berman
- Starring: Charles Victor; Zena Marshall; Cyril Chamberlain
- Cinematography: Jonah Jones
- Edited by: Jack Slade
- Music by: John Lanchbery
- Production company: Kenilworth Film Productions
- Distributed by: General Film Distributors
- Release date: 30 August 1954
- Running time: 61 minutes
- Country: United Kingdom
- Language: English

The Embezzler is a 1954 British second feature ('B') crime film directed and written by John Gilling, and starring Charles Victor, Zena Marshall and Cyril Chamberlain.

The story concerns a bank cashier who steals cash from the bank where he is employed.

== Plot ==
Henry Paulson, a quiet, respectable, henpecked, elderly bank cashier learns that he has only a couple of years left to live. He decides to embezzle money from the bank where he works and enjoy the rest of his days in South America. He books a train ticket at the travel agent and checks the itinerary of a ship and takes his suitcase to work on a quiet Friday afternoon hoping not to be discovered until Monday.

Caught in the act by his boss returning unexpectedly, the embezzler locks his boss in his office and flees to a seaside hotel in Eastbourne run by Mrs Larkin booking in under the name of Mr Laughton. There, he joins a group of residents including Mrs Forrest, who has problems of her own as she is being blackmailed by a former lover, Mr Johnson, recently released from prison. Johnson has tracked her down and booked into the same hotel. He thinks, as her husband is a GP, she will wish to hide her past. Johnson also tries to take advantage of fellow resident Miss Ackroyd, tricking her into giving him her string of pearls after deliberately snapping their thread.

Paulson hears Johnson threaten Mrs Forrest and follows her to investigate. He gives her the money she needs to give to Johnson in exchange for her love letters. After passing him the money Johnson demands a further £100 for the photostat copies he has made. Johnson returns Miss Ackroyd her pearls but then tricks her out of a valuable ring and into withdrawing her savings from the bank. He says they are engaged. Meanwhile the serial numbers of the missing notes start to appear in town. Johnson works out who Paulson is and blackmails him too, demanding half his stolen money. They chat in Paulson's room and Johnson helps himself to whisky. Paulson poisons the whisky for Johnson's next visit. Johnson works out what has happened and runs off. He meets Dr Forrest on the stairs and they fight just as the police arrive downstairs.

The fight with Johnson brings on Paulson's heart condition, and he dies. Dr Forrest tells his wife that he already knew about Johnson before they married.

== Cast ==
- Charles Victor as Henry Paulson/Mr Laughton
- Zena Marshall as Mrs Forrest
- Cyril Chamberlain as Alec Johnson
- Leslie Weston as Piggott
- Avice Landone as Miss Ackroyd
- Peggy Mount as Mrs Larkin
- Michael Craig as Doctor Forrest
- Frank Forsyth (credited as Frank Forsythe) as Inspector Gale
- Dennis Chinnery as bank clerk
- Ian Fleming as doctor
- Alastair Hunter as bank manager
- Christopher Banks as vicar (uncredited)
- Patrick Jordan as police sergeant (uncredited)
- Carole Lesley as tea shop waitress (uncredited)
- Sam Kydd as railway inspector (uncredited)
- Phyllis Morris as Mrs. Paulson (uncredited)
- Ronnie Stevens as travel agent (uncredited)
- Martin Wyldeck as 2nd police sergeant(uncredited)

== Production ==
It was made at Twickenham Studios and on location around London. The film's sets were designed by the art director C. Wilfred Arnold.

== Critical reception ==
Kine Weekly wrote: "Upretentious, yet unusual, crime drama. ... The picture occasionally loses its central figure in the crowd, but otherwise it approaches 'crime does not pay' from a new and human, if modest, slant. Charles Victor acts with conviction and feeling as Paulson, Cyril Chamberlain lives his part as extortioner Johnson, and Zena Marshall is appealing as Mrs. Forrest. The supporting types, too, are neatly etched. Ending salutary without being morbid, and atmosphere impeccable. Bigger films have achieved less."

Picturegoer wrote: "Simple and somewhat ingenuous story ... Zena Marshall is appropriately suffering as the persecuted wife."

Picture Show wrote: "Neatly directed and ably acted."

The Daily Film Renter wrote: "Pleasant character sketch by Charles Victor, some amusing cameos of hotel types, a nicely sentimental conclusion."

Sky Movies called the film a "fascinating British co-feature which supplied the elderly but excellent Charles Victor (also a perfect Inspector Teal in The Saint's Return) with his only leading role, as an embezzler".
