= What a Whopper =

1961 British film by Gilbert Gunn

- Theatrical release poster
- Directed by: Gilbert Gunn
- Written by: Terry Nation
- Produced by: Edward Joseph
- Starring: Adam Faith; Sid James; Carole Lesley
- Cinematography: Reginald H. Wyer
- Edited by: Bernard Gribble
- Music by: Laurie Johnson
- Distributed by: Regal Films International
- Release date: 17 October 1961
- Running time: 90 minutes
- Country: United Kingdom
- Language: English

What a Whopper is a 1961 British comedy film directed by Gilbert Gunn and starring Adam Faith, Sid James and Carole Lesley. It was written by Terry Nation from an original script by Jeremy Lloyd. The film was produced by Edward 'Teddy' Joseph, father of Eddy Joseph. The film follows a writer who travels to Scotland to fake a sighting of the Loch Ness Monster.

TV reporter Fyfe Robertson appears briefly as himself, covering the alleged sightings of the monster.

== Plot ==
Struggling young writer Tony Blake is served an eviction notice by Mr Slate from his rented room in a Chelsea house shared with other artistic types including abstract "flicking" painter Arnold. Tony hatches a plan to drum up interest in his rejected book on the Loch Ness Monster by faking a sighting of the creature. He and his friend Vernon, who makes electronic music, construct a phony monster, which they photograph in the Serpentine, startling a tramp. The two friends and Vernon's ditzy girlfriend Charlotte "Charlie" Pinner decide to visit Scotland to further their ruse. Driving in a second-hand Rolls-Royce hearse, they pick up a young French hitchhiker, Marie, along the way. They are pursued by Charlie's dipsomaniac father.

Tony and his friends arrive at a Loch Ness inn, whose landlord Harry Sutton is trying to conceal dozens of poached salmon from two local policemen. Tony befriends the local postman and other locals, who become more convinced the monster is real when they hear a monstrous roar from a speaker secretly installed by Vernon. The next day, the inn is swarming with customers and the press, much to the delight of Sutton and the locals. However, the crowd's enthusiasm wanes when Tony is unable to produce a promised photo of the monster. In the midst of these events, Vernon and Charlie decide to get married, Marie falls for Tony, and the poached salmon are inadvertently loaded into a police car.

Tony and his friends secretly make another phony monster to photograph, only to discover that several locals, in an attempt to draw business and attention back to the area, had the same idea and made their own fake monsters. The locals also discover the hidden speaker Tony used to broadcast roars, and realize they were deceived all along. An angry mob chases Tony and Marie, who try to escape by rowing across the loch, only for the real monster to rise from the loch as the film ends.

== Cast ==
- Adam Faith as Tony Blake
- Sid James as Harry Sutton
- Carole Lesley as Charlotte 'Charlie' Pinner
- Terence Longdon as Vernon
- Clive Dunn as Mr. Slate
- Freddie Frinton as Gilbert Pinner
- Marie-France as Marie
- Charles Hawtrey as Arnold
- Spike Milligan as tramp
- Wilfrid Brambell as postman
- Fabia Drake as Mrs. Pinner
- Harold Berens as Sammy
- Ewan Roberts as Jimmy
- Archie Duncan as Macdonald
- Terry Scott as sergeant
- Anna Gilcrist as Grace
- Gordon Rollings as Doone
- Bernard Hunter as Legree
- Lloyd Reckord as Jojo
- Lance Percival as policeman at roundabout
- Molly Weir as teacher
- Fyfe Robertson as himself
- J. Stevenson Lang as crofter
- Alistair Hunter as 1st scot
- Allan Casley as 2nd scot
- Frank Forsyth as 3rd scot

== Background ==
Aspiring writer Jeremy Lloyd was working as a travelling salesman of rust-proof paint in the late 1950s when he wrote a story called "What a Whopper" about a Cockney youth who runs tours to see the Loch Ness monster. After delivering paint near Pinewood Studios, he pitched the script to studio chief Earl St John, who bought it. Songwriter and actor Trevor Peacock provided ideas for the story and has an uncredited cameo as a barrow-boy. The script was reworked by Terry Nation. It was the first full film screenplay by Nation, who had started out writing for Spike Milligan, who has a cameo. According to writer Alwyn W. Turner What a Whopper displayed some of the strengths and flaws that would feature in Nation's subsequent television serials. Among the positives were his "ornate verbosity" (such as the postman's flowery description of the monster) and his tendency to add new complications at every opportunity, whereas the negatives included loose ends never being tied up (such as Tony's book disappearing from the story), and overt borrowing (such as the modern art parody being influenced by the recently released Tony Hancock film The Rebel).

== Release ==
In its UK release Tthe film was paired in a programme with Pit of Darkness (1961).

== Reception ==
Kinematograph Weekly wrote that the film "started somewhat leisurely around the London suburbs, but is doing excellent provincial business."

The Monthly Film Bulletin wrote: "The plot is engagingly dotty, but the film hasn't a sense of the larger lunacy and settles into an unsubtle British comedy routine ... Adam Faith, who has the face for drama, goes through the comedy motions amiably enough. But in the main the cast gets little help from the director, which probably explains why the old-timers with the experience dominate the show out of proportion to their importance. The Scottish locations are pleasing."

The Radio Times Guide to Films gave the film 2/5 stars, writing: "Adam Faith stars in this whimsical tale about a struggling writer who fakes photographs of the Loch Ness monster and then heads for the Highlands to convince the locals so that they'll back his book. Just about every comedy stalwart you can think of crops up in support ... but the laughs are as elusive as Nessie."
