= Noreen Ackland =

British film editor

- Born: Mabel Noreen Ackland; 1921; Oakley Green, Berkshire, England
- Died: 15 April 2013 (aged 91–92); Wokingham, England
- Spouse: Richard Best (1956–2004)

Noreen Ackland (1921 – 15 April 2013) was a British film editor active primarily in the 1960s. She was married to film editor Richard Best. She got her start during World War II when she joined the editing room at the Army Kinematograph Unit. She worked as an assistant to Reginald Mills early on before getting her first full editor credit on the thriller Peeping Tom (1960).

== Selected filmography ==
- Peeping Tom (1960)
- The Queen's Guards (1961)
- The Girl on the Boat (1962)
- The Password Is Courage (1962)
- Never Put It in Writing (1964)
- The Secret of My Success (1965)
- Danny the Dragon (1967)
- Some Kind of Hero (1972)
