= The Two Faces of Dr. Jekyll =

1960 British film by Terence Fisher

- Australian theatrical release poster
- Directed by: Terence Fisher
- Screenplay by: Wolf Mankowitz
- Based on: Strange Case of Dr Jekyll and Mr Hyde by Robert Louis Stevenson
- Produced by: Michael Carreras; Anthony Nelson-Keys
- Starring: Paul Massie; Dawn Addams; Christopher Lee; David Kossoff; Norma Marla; Francis de Wolff
- Cinematography: Jack Asher; Len Harris
- Edited by: Eric Boyd-Perkins; James Needs
- Music by: David Heneker; John Hollingsworth; Monty Norman
- Production company: Hammer Film Productions
- Distributed by: Columbia Pictures (U.K.); American International Pictures (U.S.)
- Release dates: 24 October 1960 (U.K.); 3 May 1961 (U.S.)
- Running time: 88 minutes
- Country: United Kingdom
- Language: English
- Budget: £146,417

The Two Faces of Dr. Jekyll (released in the US as House of Fright) is a 1960 British horror film directed by Terence Fisher and starring Paul Massie, Dawn Addams, Christopher Lee and David Kossoff. It was produced by Michael Carreras and Anthony Nelson-Keys for Hammer Film Productions. It is based on Robert Louis Stevenson's 1886 novella Strange Case of Dr. Jekyll & Mr. Hyde, and was the first Hammer film to be distributed in the US by AIP. In a departure from the source material and other adaptations, Hyde is portrayed as younger and more handsome than Jekyll rather than physically repellent.

The film was released in the UK by Columbia Pictures on 24 October 1960, and in the US by American International Pictures on 3 May 1961 under the title House of Fright. It fared poorly in the US, and AIP's next interaction with Hammer was not until 1970, with The Vampire Lovers .

== Plot ==
In Victorian London, Dr. Henry Jekyll’s theories about the human mind have caused him to be shunned by the scientific community. As a result, the middle-aged Jekyll has become cynical and semi-reclusive. His younger wife, Kitty, bored with their lack of social life, is having an affair with Paul Allen, a reckless wastrel who frequently borrows money from his friend Jekyll. Ignoring the warnings of his colleague and friend Dr. Ernst Littauer, Jekyll concocts a chemical potion which he hopes will help him learn the depths of the mind.

By testing the potion on himself, he transforms into Mr. Edward Hyde, a young and handsome but also murderous and lecherous man. He befriends an oblivious Paul, whom he joins in his reckless partying. Soon, Hyde becomes bored with conventional debauchery and when he sets his eyes on Kitty, he decides he must have her. When Kitty rejects him, Hyde rapes her and leaves her unconscious. When Kitty wakes up in the bed, she immediately notices that Hyde has stripped her. Distressed, Kitty walks over to a table, where she finds a note written to her. When Kitty goes into the other room looking for Paul, she finds her lover dead, bitten by a venomous snake which Hyde had locked in a room with him. Kitty walks to the patio, puts her leg over the balcony, covers her ears in response to the loud music playing from the party and allows herself to fall off the balcony and through the glass roof covering the party guests. Hyde kills Maria, an exotic dancer he had been having an affair with, in Jekyll's house.

The next day, Jekyll is horrified to learn of what Hyde has done. After speaking to his other half via a mirror, Jekyll turns uncontrollably into Hyde. Hyde kills a man in Jekyll's laboratory by shooting him in the back with a pistol and sets his body up at a desk in order to frame his other self for his crimes. Hyde sets fire to the laboratory as the police arrive. Via a window, Hyde pretends that Jekyll is trying to kill him as the building burns. After escaping the building, Hyde claims Jekyll tried to kill Hyde and ended up shooting himself due to madness, as the innocent man and Jekyll's laboratory burns.

Some time later, Hyde, Littauer and the police attend the coroner's court, where it is found that Jekyll was responsible for the deaths due to his dangerous experimentation with drugs, and that he then took his own life. Hyde tries to leave the building, but at the last minute Jekyll fights him from the inside and takes over again, apparently erasing the Hyde persona. As Dr. Littauer recognises his old friend, Dr. Jekyll sits on a bench and is surrounded by astonished people. With tears in his eyes, he says that only he could stop Hyde, and that he has now destroyed him. The police move forward and arrest him for his crimes.

== Cast ==
- Paul Massie as Dr. Henry Jekyll/Mr. Edward Hyde
- Dawn Addams as Kitty Jekyll
- Christopher Lee as Paul Allen
- David Kossoff as Dr. Littauer
- Francis de Wolff as Inspector
- Norma Marla as Maria
- Magda Miller as Sphinx Girl (uncredited)
- Oliver Reed as nightclub bouncer (uncredited)
- William Kendall as clubman (uncredited)
- Janina Faye as Jane
- Helen Goss as nanny (uncredited)
- Pauline Shepherd as prostitute (uncredited)
- Percy Cartwright as coroner (uncredited)
- Joe Robinson as Corinthian (uncredited)
- Arthur Lovegrove as cabby (uncredited)
- Felix Felton as first gambler (uncredited)

== Production ==
The screenplay was by Wolf Mankowitz, based on the 1886 novella Strange Case of Dr Jekyll and Mr Hyde by Robert Louis Stevenson. The film had a working title Jekyll's Inferno at one point.

The film was originally to star Louis Jourdan. Argentinian actress Isabel Sarli was offered a role in the film. Filming occurred at Bray Studios in Berkshire. Oliver Reed appears in a small role in his first film for Hammer, and Christopher Lee considered it one of his very best roles.

Filming went from 23 November 1959 to 22 January 1960, and it was trade shown on 20 August 1960, and premiered at the London Pavilion on 7 October 1960.

Dr. Jekyll has brown eyes and wears a full beard with rather long hair and bushy eyebrows, whereas Mr. Hyde is blue-eyed, clean shaven and has a shorter haircut. Beyond this, their physical appearance is nearly identical, making this portrayal different from most film adaptations of the novel. However, the story is presented as though Hyde looks different enough from Jekyll that even Mrs. Jekyll notices no resemblance.

In contrast to other film versions, Jekyll was portrayed as a rather bland and ordinary person, while Hyde was presented as suave and handsome. This reflects director Fisher's belief in what critics (such as biographer Wheeler Winston Dixon) called "the charm of evil". Critics wondered why Jekyll's beard disappeared each time he turned into the younger-looking (smooth shaven) Mr. Hyde.

== Reception ==
The Monthly Film Bulletin wrote that the film "may be forgiven for tampering with a classic, but not for doing so with such a depressing lack of either wit or competence ...Silliness, in fact, has got the better of the film to such an extent that even its most calculatedly vicious episodes appear only mildly grotesque. The production, which uses up colour film lavishly on such episodes as a cancan sequence, is otherwise hard-up for ideas."

Variety gave the film a good review, praising Paul Massie for an "interesting performance" and Jack Asher for "colorful and sure" camerawork.

Eugene Archer of The New York Times called the film "lurid", and Massie "frankly ridiculous."

Harrison's Reports graded the film as "Fair", adding, "Horror fans will hardly be scared by this well-mounted British import... Paul Massie does the best he can in the poorly written twin role."

The film lost Hammer an estimated £30,000.

== Potential Remake ==
In the mid-nineties, Denis Meikle wrote a potential remake under the suggestion of producer Michael Carreras. The script, titled Hyde: Monster of Desire, was briefly considered at 20th Century Fox before being revived at Dreamscape Pictures, with the idea of its being a $50 million picture with Sean Connery as Jekyll/Hyde. Ultimately, the critical and commercial flop of Mary Reilly (1996), TriStar Pictures' own Jekyll and Hyde film, and the dissolution of Dreamscape ended the project. The script is currently available on Meikle's website.

== See also ==
The Face of Another (1966), another film about a man who has an affair with his estranged wife by changing his face.
