= Carole Lesley =

British actress (1935–1974)

- Lesley in 1957
- Born: Maureen Carol Lesley Rippingale; 27 May 1935; Chelmsford, Essex, England
- Died: 28 February 1974 (aged 38); New Barnet, London, England
- Occupation: Actress
- Spouse: Michael Dalling (m. 1964)
- Children: 2

Carole Lesley (born Maureen Carol Lesley Rippingale; 27 May 1935 – 28 February 1974) was a British actress who had a short but significant career in the 1950s and early 1960s. Hailed by critics as a "glamorous cross between Marilyn Monroe and Diana Dors", Lesley became known as a blonde bombshell and starred in a number of films.

== Early life ==
Lesley was born Maureen Carol Lesley Rippingale in Chelmsford, Essex, the second of three children of Rupert and Winifred Rippingale (née Appleton). Neighbours would see a young Lesley dancing under the street lamps outside her home in Manor Road, Chelmsford with dreams of becoming a star, and her early jobs included working at a fruit farm in the nearby village of Galleywood and as an usherette in the local Chelmsford Pavilion cinema.

== Career ==
Lesley made her film debut aged 12 in The Silver Darlings (1947), and followed this with a role in Trottie True (1949) when she was 14. Aged 16, Lesley ran away from home "aiming to become a star" first to London where she worked in several cabaret clubs and nightclubs as a dancer. She then went on to Paris where she worked for two years as a pin-up model under the name Leslie Carol. Whilst in France, Lesley would attend film premieres and other similar events alongside Jayne Mansfield and Richard Todd.

Lesley then returned to England and had a small role in the film The Embezzler (1954). Following this, she secured a seven-year contract with Associated British Pictures and began using the name Carole Lesley. Lesley would go on to star in several films in the late 1950s and early 1960s, including the 1957 film Woman in a Dressing Gown, which won the 1958 Golden Globe Award for Best English-Language Foreign Film. Lesley would attend a large number of premieres, social events and parties, and appeared on many magazine covers. She would often be involved in tabloid feuds with fellow blonde actress Sabrina.

Lesley began filming scenes in Tripoli for Ice Cold in Alex, but later dropped out and the role was instead played by Diane Clare. Lesley's next project was These Dangerous Years (1957), in which she was praised by critics, one stating that "Carole Lesley gives that rarity of the British film world, an actress with both talent and glamour". The Evening Chronicle lauded Lesley's performance, saying that "her impact is immediate and scorching. Unlike most other British film actresses, Miss Lesley flaunts her sex-appeal like a banner. She is lovely and she knows it." Lesley represented Great Britain at the 1958 Cannes Film Festival. In 1959, she went on to star in No Trees in the Street (1959), Operation Bullshine (1959) and played Helen of Troy in a television play.

Lesley's film roles in the 1960s primarily consisted of comedies, including Doctor in Love (1960) with Michael Craig and Leslie Phillips, and What a Whopper (1961) opposite Adam Faith and Sid James. Her final screen role would be that of Wendy in The Pot Carriers (1962).

== Later life and death ==
In April 1963, Lesley announced that she was to marry film publicist Michael Dalling that August, which was promoted by a photoshoot in Regent's Park in London; the engagement made front page news in the UK. Later that month, Associated British Pictures decided to end Lesley's contract, which devastated her. Already "haunted by a crippling lack of confidence", and a self-confessed "terrible worrier", the decision by the studios took its toll on Lesley, and her health began to deteriorate.

In May 1963, Lesley was discovered in her flat by her mother with "cuts on her arms and legs" and was taken to hospital but was discharged a day later, with Lesley telling the press that she "had been silly" and apologised "for the fuss I have caused". On two occasions in August 1963, Lesley was admitted to hospital for overdosing on sleeping pills.

Lesley instead married Dalling in 1964; Lesley told an interviewer at the time, "I wanted to be a good actress but now I am prepared to face the fact that I was only mediocre. I will now try to be a good housewife instead". Lesley subsequently had two sons with Dalling and lived in a semi-detached house overlooking New Barnet station in north London, but by 1973 was described as "a deeply depressed, once beautiful woman, still haunted by a glamorous past".

For the final two years of her life, Lesley received private treatment after becoming dependent on barbiturates. On 28 February 1974, Lesley telephoned a friend and asked her to pick her children up from school, as she was suffering from a migraine; concerned for her welfare, the friend contacted social services but there was no response when they arrived at Lesley's New Barnet home. Lesley's husband Michael Dalling telephoned Lesley from work, but after getting no reply, he travelled home. Lesley was found dead by Dalling in the kitchen of their family home.

At her inquest, the coroner recorded a verdict of suicide by an overdose of barbiturates, and the pathologist confirmed that Lesley's death was caused by barbiturate poisoning, and that Lesley had taken approximately 30 capsules in one single dose.

== Legacy ==
The Chelmsford Pavilion Cinema, where Lesley worked in her teenage years as an usherette, was demolished in 2007 and replaced by a retail and residential complex which was named Carole Lesley Court in her memory.

== Filmography ==
Film and television
Year	Title	Role	Notes
1947	The Silver Darlings	Una (child)	
1949	Trottie True	Clare (child)	
1954	The Embezzler	Tea Shop Waitress	Uncredited
1957	The Good Companions	Film Star	
1957	Woman in a Dressing Gown	Hilda	
1957	These Dangerous Years	Dinah Brown	
1959	No Trees in the Street	Lova	
1959	Operation Bullshine	Pte. Marge White	
1960	Doctor in Love	Kitten Strudwick	
1960	ITV Play of the Week	Helen of Troy	Episode: "Tiger at the Gates"
1961	Three on a Spree	Susan	
1961	What a Whopper	Charlotte 'Charlie' Pinner	
1962	The Pot Carriers	Wendy	
