= Ambrosine Phillpotts =

British actress (1912–1980)

- in Ooh… You Are Awful (1972)
- Born: Ambrosine Marie Phillpotts; 13 September 1912; London, England
- Died: 12 October 1980 (aged 68); London, England
- Occupation: Actress
- Years active: 1946-1980

Ambrosine Phillpotts (13 September 1912 – 12 October 1980) was a British actress of theatre, TV, radio and film. The Times wrote, "She was one of the last great stage aristocrats, a stylish comedienne best known for playing on stage and screen a succession of increasingly 'grandes dames' with an endearing mixture of Edwardian snobbery and eccentric absent-mindedness".

== Partial filmography ==
- This Man Is Mine (1946) - Lady Daubney
- The Chiltern Hundreds (1949) - Lady Fielding
- The Franchise Affair (1951) - Miss Spence
- Happy Go Lovely (1951) - Lady Martin
- Mr. Denning Drives North (1952) - Miss Blade
- Angels One Five (1952) - Mother at Party (uncredited)
- Stolen Face (1952) - Miss Patten - Fur Department Clerk
- Father's Doing Fine (1952) - Nurse Pynegar (uncredited)
- The Captain's Paradise (1953) - Marjorie (with the major)
- Aunt Clara (1954) - Sylvia Levington (uncredited)
- The Adventures of Quentin Durward (1955) - Lady Hameline (uncredited)
- The Battle of the River Plate (1956) - Mrs. Millington-Drake, Montevideo (uncredited)
- Up in the World (1956) - Lady Banderville
- The Truth About Women (1957) - Lady Tavistock
- The Duke Wore Jeans (1958) - Duchess Cynthia Whitecliffe
- The Reluctant Debutante (1958) - Miss Grey - Secretary (uncredited)
- Room at the Top (1959) - Mrs. Brown
- Operation Bullshine (1959) - Reporter
- Expresso Bongo (1959) - Lady Rosemary
- Doctor in Love (1960) - Lady Spratt
- Carry On Regardless (1961) - Yoki's Owner
- Raising the Wind (1961) - Mrs. Featherstone
- Two and Two Make Six (1962) - Lady Smith-Adams
- Carry On Cabby (1963) - Aristocratic Lady
- Life at the Top (1965) - Mrs. Margaret Brown
- Berserk! (1967) - Miss Burrows
- Follow Me! (1972) - Dinner Guest (uncredited)
- Ooh... You Are Awful (1972) - Lady Missenden Green
- Diamonds on Wheels (1974) - Lady Truesdale
- Wilde Alliance ('Flower Power', episode) (1978) - Mrs. Tregaskis
- The Wildcats of St Trinian's (1980) - Mrs Mowbray (Last appearance)
