= These Dangerous Years =

1957 British film by Herbert Wilcox

- British quad poster
- Directed by: Herbert Wilcox
- Written by: Jack Trevor Story
- Produced by: Anna Neagle
- Starring: George Baker; Frankie Vaughan; Carole Lesley; Thora Hird; Kenneth Cope; David Lodge; John Le Mesurier
- Cinematography: Gordon Dines
- Edited by: Basil Warren
- Music by: Stanley Black
- Color process: Black and white
- Production company: Everest Pictures Ltd.
- Distributed by: Associated British-Pathé
- Release dates: 3 July 1957 (London); 8 July 1958 (USA)
- Running time: 99 minutes
- Country: United Kingdom
- Language: English

These Dangerous Years (also known as Dangerous Youth) is a 1957 British drama musical film directed by Herbert Wilcox and starring George Baker, Frankie Vaughan, Carole Lesley, Thora Hird, Kenneth Cope, David Lodge and John Le Mesurier. It was written by Jack Trevor Story, and was the first of three films Wilcox made with Vaughan.

== Plot ==
Tough gang leader and wannabe rock star Dave Wyman, from the slums of Liverpool, gets called up for National Service. He undergoes basic training, finds the discipline surprisingly suits him, and emerges stronger. When his best friend from training is killed by the camp bully, Dave takes revenge, and eventually ends up marrying his singing partner.

== Cast ==
- George Baker as the Padre
- Frankie Vaughan as Dave Wyman
- Carole Lesley as Dinah Brown
- Jocelyn Lane as Maureen
- Katherine Kath as Mrs Wyman
- Thora Hird as Mrs Larkin
- Eddie Byrne as Danny
- Kenneth Cope as juggler
- Robert Desmond as Cream O'Casey
- Ray Jackson as Smiler Larkin
- Richard Leech as Captain Brewster
- John Le Mesurier as Commanding Officer
- David Lodge as Sergeant Major Lockwood
- Michael Ripper as Private Simpson
- Reginald Beckwith as hairdresser
- Martin Boddey as Police Sergeant
- Lloyd Lamble as Police Officer
- Bunner O'Keeffe as youth buying the Liverpool Echo

== Production ==
It was the first solo producing effort from Anna Neagle. The film was known as The Cast Iron Shore and was to be the first of three films Neagle made with Diana Dors. However Dors was in Hollywood and declined to return to make the film .

The army sequences were filmed in the Inglis Barracks, Mill Hill, London NW7.

George Baker later said it "wasn't a good film. Herbert was trying to break away, you see. They'd all gone for Frankie Vaughan and this was a Liverpool film with a message about how tough it is in the Dingle. It wasn't attractive to a lot of people because it wasn't well enough made. The script was by Jack Trevor Story and he and Herbert had no meeting-ground whatever."

== Reception ==
=== Critical ===
The Monthly Film Bulletin wrote: "These Dangerous Years opens with promise; the Liverpool backgrounds are freshly observed, and the pace is brisk. What follows – the hero's entry into the army and the subsequent melodrama – is less appealing. The flat script invokes every old joke about Army life; and the outcome of the mawkish drama is always obvious. Frankie Vaughan, a popular singing star, makes a vigorous if not particularly likeable screen debut. Eddie Byrne's lively performance is the only bright spot in a dull supporting cast."

Kine Weekly wrote: "The picture borrows the best ideas, gags and situations from time honoured mixed-up kid melodrama and evergreen squarebashing comedy and vigorously shakes them against authentic backgrounds. Frankie Vaughan, lucky to escape an army crop, acts naturally, displays a strong sense of humour and sings pleasantly as Dave, Carole Lesley is a charming and talented Dinah and George Baker succeeds, despite the handicap of a few mushy lines, in doing a grand job as the padre. The supporting types are no less effective. Its dance hall sequences are gay and both the serious and comic sides of army life are adequately portrayed. The film's alchemy may not be subtle, but it's definitely box-office."

=== Box office ===
According to Kinematograph Weekly the film was "in the money" at the British box office in 1957.
