= Nom-de-Plume =

BBC television drama series

Nom-de-Plume is a British television drama series made and first broadcast by BBC Television in 1956.

Each episode tells a stand-alone story of a notable man or woman and has a length of thirty minutes. The common theme running through them all is that the name the main character is well known by, usually a pen name or stage name, is not revealed until near the end.

The series was created by Hector and Dorothy Crawford.

== Episodes ==
=== "The Man from the Sea" ===
Friday 18 May 1956
Written by Antony Brown

Cast

- Patrick Troughton as Korzeniowski
- Peter Wyngarde as Blunt
- Bernard Bresslaw as Dominic
- Ronald Fraser as Steward

A Polish seaman called Józef Teodor Konrad Korzeniowski turns himself into a writer in English, his fourth language.

=== "Portrait in a Mirror" ===
Friday 25 May 1956

Charles L. Dodgson is an Oxford mathematician and clergyman who has other ambitions.

=== "The Devil's Tattoo" ===
Friday 1 June 1956

=== "Child of Her Time" ===
Friday 8 June 1956
Written by Ian Dallas

Cast

- Peter Wyngarde as Monsieur Latouche

Aurore Dupin de Francueil is a French girl with ambitions.

=== "The Innocent Gunman" ===
Friday 15 June 1956

Something happens in the life of Samuel L. Clemens.

=== "The Courtesan" ===
Friday 22 June 1956

Ludwig I of Bavaria takes a dancer called Eliza as a mistress, who soon has real power in the land.

=== "The Eye of the Morning" ===
Friday 29 June 1956

=== "The Nightmare Man" ===
Friday 6 July 1956 Edgar Allan Poe has dreams and nightmares.

=== "The Ten Strangers" ===
Friday 20 July 1956

=== "Legacy of Death" ===
Friday 27 July 1956

=== "Friend of the People" ===
Friday 3 August 1956

=== "The Man Who Made People" ===
Friday 10 August 1956 Written by Robert Furnival

Cast

- David Markham as Alexandre
- Tutte Lemkow as Felix
- John Moffatt as Sergei Pavlovitch
- Lee Montague as Leon
- Tom McCall as Pianist
- Susan Pearson as Ballet Mistress
- Anna Wing as Old woman
- Andreas Malandrinos as Sweeper
- Raymond Witch as Stage hand
- John Barrard as Journalist
- Roger Delgado as Regisseur
- Lucy Young, Eileen Elton, Sylvia Herklots as Dancers
- W. Lyon Brown, J. McArthur Gordon, Douglas Jones as Aristocrats

=== "A Rough Diamond" ===
Friday 17 August 1956
Written by Richard Wade
Produced by Peter Lambert
Designed by Gordon Roland

Cast

- John Saunders as Cecil Rhodes
- Donald Morley as Barnet Isaacs
- David Lander as Afrikaaner Barman
- Edward Higgins as First Digger
- Patrick Maynard as Second Digger
- Arthur Lawrence as Third Digger
- Lewis Wilson as Harry Isaacs
- Gina Bon as Fanny
- Gerald Blake as Solly Joel
- Jan Conrad as Alfred Beit
- Robert Raglan as Englishman
- Frank Forsythe as Doctor

=== "The Man with a Hundred Hands" ===
Friday 24 August 1956

=== "Elephants Don't Disappear" ===
Friday 31 August 1956
Written by Ian Dallas
Directed by Frank Dermody
Magical adviser Geoffrey Robinson
Designed by Norman James

- Erich Weiss claims he can make an elephant disappear on stage.

Cast

- Peter Wyngarde as Erich Weiss
- Margaret Clifford as Showgirl
- Ellen Pollock as Mrs. Rahner
- Mary Watson as Beatrice
- Gaylord Cavallaro as Sideshow Barker
- John Paul as Police Officer
- Alastair Hunter as Police Sergeant
- James Dyrenforth as George Sadleir
- Nigel Sharpe as Stage Manager
- John Stuart as Smith
- Judy Monitz as Dancer
- Daphne Johnson as Dancer
- Eithne Milne as Dancer
- Mavis Ascott as Dancer

=== "The Counting-House Clerk" ===
Friday 7 September 1956
Written by Michael Voysey
Produced by Lyon Todd
Designed by Gordon Roland

Cast

- Robert Stephens as John
- Eric Messiter as Father
- Jane Henderson as Mother
- Robert Rietti as Hazlitt
- Ann Sears as Ann Simmons
- Una Venning as Mrs Field
- Valerie White as Bridget
- John Dunbar as Mr Simmons
- Barbara Ogilvie as Mrs Simmons
- Michael Collins as Coleridge
- Avril Wheatley as Kitty
- Douglas Storm as Coroner
- Shirley Thieman as Sarah
- Carol Marsh as Fanny
- Alexander Field as Theatre manager
- Edgar Wreford as Young man

=== "The Free Air" ===
Friday 14 September 1956
Written by Elwyn Jones Produced by Peter Lambert
Designed by Douglas Smith

Cast

- Barrie Hesketh as Blandford
- Frank Forsythe as Monsieur Vincent:
- Lewis Wilson as Lawyer
- Duncan Lewis as Monsieur Arouet
- John Clarke-Smith as Priest
- Arthur Lawrence as Secretary
- Robert S. Young as Adam
- Tessa Clarke as Reine
- John Nettleton as Paul
- Bryan Kendrick as Gaston
- Arnold Yarrow as Sentry
- Reginald Jessup as Officer
- Tarn Bassett as Actress

A young Frenchman called François-Marie Arouet has an adventure.

=== "Well, He Was a Success" ===
Friday 21 September 1956 This story begins in London in 1929 and ends in Hollywood three years later.
