= Orders to Kill =

- British theatrical poster
- Directed by: Anthony Asquith
- Written by: Paul Dehn; George St. George; Donald C. Downes (original story)
- Produced by: Anthony Havelock-Allan
- Starring: Eddie Albert; Paul Massie; Lillian Gish; James Robertson Justice; Irene Worth; Philip Bond; Leslie French; John Crawford
- Cinematography: Desmond Dickinson
- Edited by: Gordon Hales
- Music by: Benjamin Frankel
- Distributed by: British Lion Film Corporation (U.K.); United Motion Pictures Organization (U.S.)
- Release date: March 1958
- Running time: 107 minutes
- Country: United Kingdom
- Language: English
- Budget: £170,832

Orders to Kill is a 1958 British wartime drama film directed by Anthony Asquith and starring Paul Massie, Eddie Albert and Irene Worth. It was written by Paul Dehn and George St. George, based on a story by Donald Chase Downes, a former American intelligence operative who also acted as technical adviser to the film.

== Plot ==
Washington, DC, 1944. Gene Summers, a young U.S. Army Air Force ex-bombardier who speaks French fluently, is selected for a mission in Nazi-occupied Paris, where he will assassinate a supposed double agent, Marcel Lafitte, working in the French Resistance. He travels home to Boston to visit his mother before being transferred to England for rigorous training. Summers is then dropped into France. He makes his way to Paris, where he meets his Resistance contact, Léonie, a dressmaker. She provides Summers with identity cards for use once he has completed his mission, the plans for which she must be unaware, lest she is ever interrogated. Summers, however, after observing and then unexpectedly meeting Lafitte at a café, experiences second thoughts about his mission. Lafitte is gentle, polite, friendly, and intelligent. He has a wife and daughter whom he obviously loves, and he also dotes on his pet cat, Mimieux, protecting her from harm at a time when cats are being killed and eaten due to food shortages.

At a subsequent meeting, with curfew drawing near, Lafitte apparently saves Summers from being detained by German troops (who are hunting a Resistance assassin) by allowing him to take shelter in his office. Summers' misgivings deepen and he begins to doubt Lafitte is a double agent. Summers reveals all this to Leonie, but she rebukes him sharply, reminding him that he would not have been ordered to kill without reason. His confidence regained, Summers prepares to kill Lafitte. Returning to his office, he cracks a blunt object over the man's head, but the blow merely stuns him. The stricken Lafitte turns over to look directly into the eyes of Summers. He then utters a single word: "Why?" In a panic, Summers stabs Lafitte with a pair of scissors, killing him. He then steals money from Lafitte's table, attempting to make the scene look like a robbery. Narrowly escaping the Gestapo, the distraught Summers hides the money in a cemetery. He tries to contact Léonie, but it is too late. The Nazis have captured her. Racked with guilt, Summers steals off into the night.

Several months later, after Paris has been liberated, Summers is recovering in a military hospital. After the assassination, he had retreated into alcoholism, spending the money he stole from Lafitte to finance his habit. Summers learns that Léonie was killed by the Nazis after her capture. At first, the Army tries to convince him that Lafitte was guilty and that many lives were saved by his death. However, Summers is not convinced and insists on knowing the truth. It is finally revealed that Lafitte was, in fact, innocent.

Summers leaves the hospital to visit Lafitte's wife and daughter, who are now impoverished. Unable to tell them all the facts behind Lafitte's death, Summers instead praises Lafitte as one of the Allies' best Resistance agents. He then offers them his own back pay, which they gratefully accept.

== Cast ==
- Eddie Albert as Major MacMahon
- Paul Massie as Gene Summers
- Lillian Gish as Mrs. Summers
- James Robertson Justice as Naval Commander
- Leslie French as Marcel Lafitte
- Irene Worth as Léonie
- John Crawford as Maj. Kimball
- Lionel Jeffries as Interrogator
- Nicholas Phipps as Lecturer Lieutenant
- Sandra Dorne as Blonde with German officer
- Jacques B. Brunius as Cmndt. Morand (as Jacques Brunius)
- Robert Henderson as Col. Snyder
- Miki Iveria as Louise
- Lillie Bea Gifford as Mauricette (as Lillabea Gifford)
- Anne Blake as Mme. Lafitte
- Sam Kydd as Flight Sergeant Flint
- Ann Walford as F.A.N.Y.
- Denyse Alexander as Pat (as Denyse MacPherson)

== Production ==
The film was based on an original story by Donald Downes, an OSS operative involved in numerous missions during the war. He later became a writer; his novel Orders to Kill was published after the film was shot.

The silent movie actress Lillian Gish appears as the hero's mother.

Producer Tony Havelock-Allan said the idea for the film was brought to him by director Anthony Asquith. The producer felt it "would have been better with a harder, sharper edge to it. It needed to be conceived more harshly. Both the films I did with Puffin [Asquith's nickname] were well made, well crafted, but the impact was soft and did not grip a worldwide audience. Orders to Kill was a very good story — how hard it is to kill an enemy when you get to know him personally — but the public simply didn’t go for it." Havelock-Allan also recalled that "Puffin had known Lillian Gish in Hollywood in the ’20s and loved her, so that’s how she came to be in it."

== Critical reception ==
At the time of the film's release, Bosley Crowther of The New York Times wrote. "This promising melodrama loses steam and credibility and ends in a sad heap of sentiment that should make an old cloak-and-dagger boy turn gray."

The Monthly Film Bulletin opined: "This important British film makes a strong, almost unequivocal, moral comment on the effects of war on the individual conscience, and it is these far-reaching implications which give it its main strength. ...The playing of a strangely assorted cast, guided by Asquith's close direction, is generally firm and detailed. Although clearly inexperienced, Paul Massie successfully achieves the character's change from the light-hearted banter of the beginning to the painful internal struggle of the latter half; and Eddie Albert is quietly convincing as his commanding officer and mentor. Leslie French's portrait of the suspected traitor is most subtly observed, as is James Robertson Justice's Naval Commander. Lillian Gish, alas, makes less of an even smaller role as Gene's mother."

The Radio Times has called it "a forgotten gem of the British cinema ... a welcome change from the usual British war movie in which Richard Todd or John Mills carry on regardless."

At the Cannes Film Festival, the American juror, veteran director Charles Vidor, found the film offensive to the United States military. Thus, the film did not succeed in competition, though others felt it was the best movie of the festival.

== Accolades ==
The film won three BAFTA film awards, including best actress for Irene Worth as Léonie and best newcomer to Paul Massie for his performance in the lead role of Summers. The film was entered into the 1958 Cannes Film Festival.
