= Anne Kimbell =

American actress (1932–2017)

- Kimbell in 1957
- Born: June 28, 1932; New Orleans, Louisiana, U.S.
- Died: May 16, 2017 (aged 84)
- Occupation: Actress
- Spouse: James F. Relph

Anne Kimbell Relph, known professionally as Anne Kimbell (née Banks; June 28, 1932 – May 16, 2017) was an American actress most active on screen during the 1950s. Kimbell is best known as the star of the 1954 science fiction film, Monster from the Ocean Floor.

Beginning in the early 1990s, Kimbell preserved the Jones Theater in Westcliffe, Colorado, and founded the Westcliffe Center for the Performing Arts.

== Early years ==
Kimbell was born in New Orleans, Louisiana, to Andrew and Kathryn (née Collins) Banks. She moved to Hollywood, California with her family when she was three years old. At the age of four, she was cast in her first radio role on The Children's Radio Workshop in Los Angeles, which began her radio and voice acting career. She joined the Screen Actors Guild (SAG) when she was just twelve years old.

She studied theater in New York City under Lee Strasberg. Kimbell later received her Bachelor of Arts in English from the University of Virginia and her master's degree in women's studies from George Washington University in Washington D.C.

== Film ==
Kimbell's earliest film credits included 1945's Roughly Speaking, where she played Rosalind Russell's daughter, and Growing Up, as John Garfield's on-screen sister.

Kimbell starred in the lead role in 1954's Monster from the Ocean Floor, the first film produced by Roger Corman, as well as the British comedy, Girls at Sea, in 1958.

She also co-starred in several other films, including Feudin' Fools in 1952, and The Bob Mathias Story.

== Television ==
Kimbell's television credits included recurring roles and guest spots on General Electric Theater, G.E. Summer Originals, Chevron Theatre, The Adventures of Kit Carson, Crossroads, and the BBC's Sunday Night Theatre.

== Stage ==
During the 1950s, Kimbell co-starred in the Broadway production of The Seven Year Itch alongside Eddie Bracken and the touring production of Arms and the Man with Marlon Brando. In 1956 she was the leading lady for the summer at Denver's Elitch Theatre, where she reprised her role in The Seven Year Itch. Kimbell starred in the 1957 London production of Roar Like a Dove, which was produced by actress Vivien Leigh.

== Personal life ==
Kimbell met her future husband, James F. Relph, a United States Foreign Service officer, while appearing on stage in London. The couple married in London. She effectively retired from film to join Relph at his diplomatic postings in Switzerland, Germany, Chad, and Tunisia.

Kimbell and her family returned to California during the early 1980s. During her later life, Kimbell divided her time between her home in Westcliffe, Colorado, and a second home in Laguna Beach, California.

== Administration ==
=== California ===
Kimbell served as the executive director of the Orange County Center at the University of Southern California, which encourages professionals to obtain advanced degrees in business, education or social work. She also founded an "Enterprising Woman" organization to support female entrepreneurs.

=== Colorado ===
In 1992, Kimbell traveled to Colorado with the intention of purchasing a horse ranch. She acquired the ranch as planned, but also purchased the Jones Theater in Westcliffe, Colorado, which the previous owner had intended to convert into a laundromat. Kimbell wanted to preserve the theater as a working cultural landmark in the Wet Mountain Valley. She founded the Westcliffe Center for the Performing Arts (WCPA) and based it at the theater. She and her business partner, Tom Stagg, expanded the WCPA and oversaw the addition of the new Studio 2 onto the existing Jones Theater. Kimbell also developed the Shakespeare in the Park festival, which is now held annually in Westcliffe. She served as the WCPA's president, producer and, finally, its artistic director until her death in 2017.

=== Other countries ===
Kimbell developed women's cultural programs in Tunisia and a school for women in Chad.

== Writing ==
Kimbell was the author of several novels, including To Catch a Spy, The Ibeji Twins and Assignment Paris.

== Death ==
Kimbell died on May 16, 2017, at the age of 84.
