= Monster from the Ocean Floor =

1954 film

- Theatrical release poster
- Directed by: Wyott Ordung
- Written by: Bill Danch
- Produced by: Roger Corman
- Starring: Anne Kimbell; Stuart Wade; Dick Pinner; David Garcia
- Cinematography: Floyd Crosby
- Edited by: Edward Sampson
- Music by: Andre Brummer
- Production company: Palo Alto Productions
- Distributed by: Lippert Pictures
- Release date: May 21, 1954
- Running time: 64 minutes
- Country: United States
- Language: English
- Budget: $30,000 or $15,000
- Box office: $850,000 or $185,000

Monster from the Ocean Floor is a 1954 American science fiction film directed by Wyott Ordung and starred Anne Kimbell and Stuart Wade. The film's plot was about a sea monster that terrorizes a Mexican cove.

It was the first film produced by Roger Corman (although he had previously written Highway Dragnet).

== Plot ==
Julie Blair is an American artist vacationing at a seaside village in Mexico. She hears stories about a man-eating creature dwelling in the cove. She meets Steve Dunning, a marine biologist doing research in the area, and they fall for one another. She further investigates the stories of a sea monster killing people along with unexplained disappearances in the area. Julie thinks there might be some substance to these rumors, but Dunning does not.

The mysterious death of a diver inspires Julie to investigate, but Dunning remains very skeptical. She sees a giant amoeba rising from the ocean. Thinking fast she is able to get a tissue sample from the monster. Confronted with the evidence, and now admitting the creature does in fact exist, Dunning uses the submarine to attack the monster.

== Cast ==
- Anne Kimbell as Julie Blair
- Stuart Wade as Steve Dunning
- Dick Pinner as Dr. Baldwin
- Wyott Ordung as Pablo
- Inez Palange as Tula
- Jonathan Haze as Joe
- David Garcia as Jose
- Roger Corman as Tommy

== Production ==
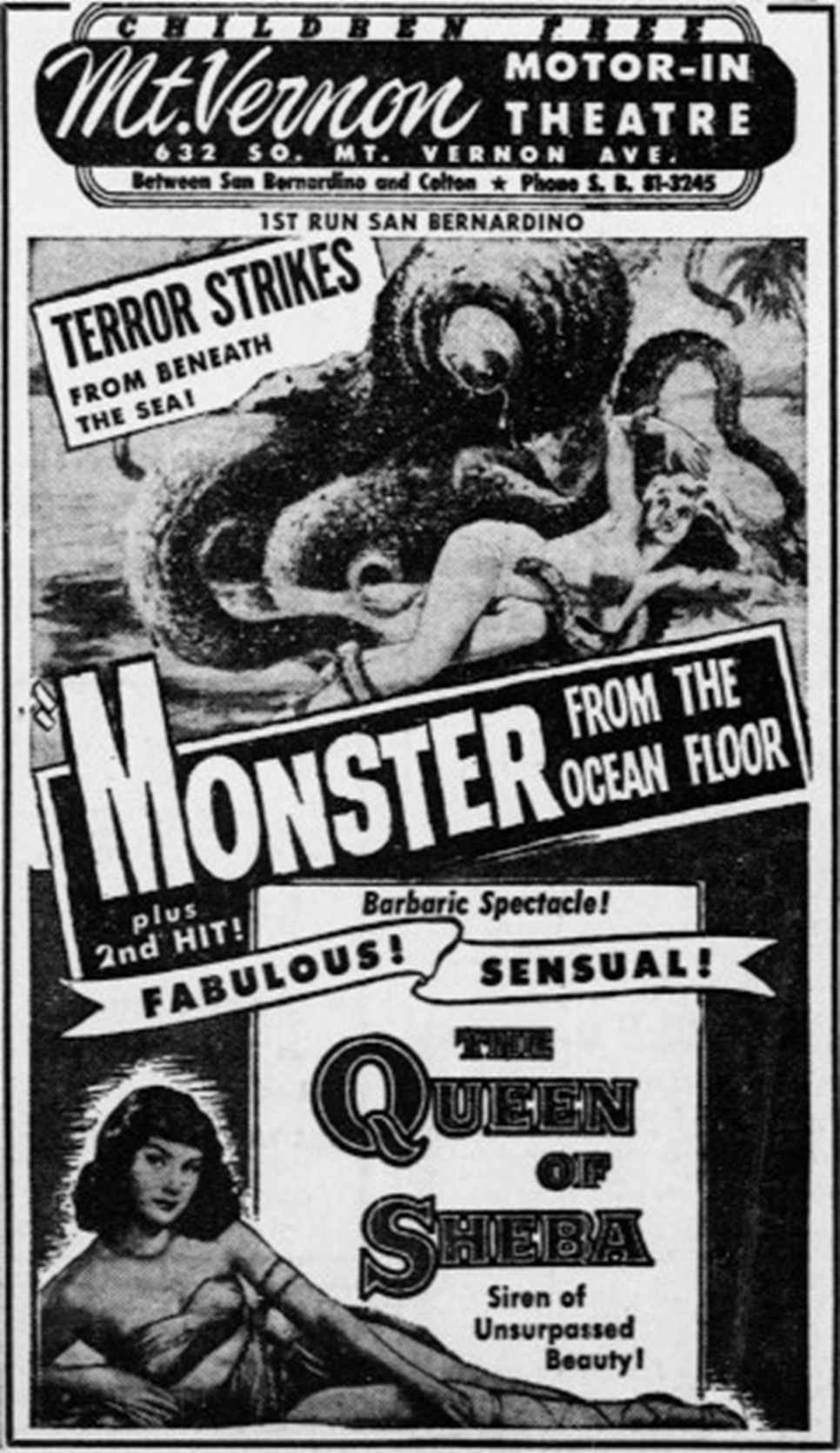
Drive-in advertisement from 1954 for Monster from the Ocean Floor and co-feature, The Queen of Sheba.

It was the first film produced by Roger Corman. One of his first decisions was to allow Wyott Ordung to direct. Ordung agreed to divert part of his pay for the experience of directing. Corman was also able to defer payment against future profits to make the final print.

Alan Frank listed Monster from the Ocean Floor's budget as $30,000. However, Corman stated that the film was made for $12,000 in cash over six days. According to Corman, $4,000 of the film's budget came from Ordung, $3,500 from Corman (from the sale of the Highway Dragnet story to Allied Artists), $5,000 in deferment from Consolidated Labs, and money raised privately by selling $500 and $1,000 shares. Ordung later claimed that he hocked his life insurance and sold his apartment to raise $15,000 to pay for the film. Corman's brother, Gene Corman, estimated the budget at $35,000. Variety said the film cost $15,000.

Producer Alex Gordon later recalled meeting Corman at a screening of the movie. "I thought, for the money he brought it in for, was absolutely remarkable," said Gordon. I thought it was very, very good and that he was a very nice, young, polite guy. And very nice-looking, properly dressed — he looked like a young executive, not some guy who was just lolling around like some of the other guys who were around in those days, coming around to try and get jobs." The men would later work together on Apache Woman and Day the World Ended.

Roger Corman had seen an article on a new electric-powered one-man submarine, and was able to use it in the picture for free in exchange for the publicity and an on-screen credit ("Submarine built by Aerojet General").

This is the first appearance of Haze in a Corman film, he would become a regular in Corman's films.

Corman said when he made the film, "I was surprisingly confident. I think if I were to do it now, I would be very worried that I couldn't do it. But at the age of twenty-five or whatever, I had ambition and confidence. You do things that, when you're older and smarter, you wouldn't do. "

The film's original title was It Stalked the Ocean Floor, but was changed by the distributor for being too artsy.

In an interview with Starlog, it was noted that the experience of making this movie hooked Corman on filmmaking as a career. It also established a professional relationship between Corman, James Nicholson and Samuel Arkoff, that would lead to the creation of American International Pictures.

=== Distributor ===
Corman's brother Gene, who was then an agent at MCA, negotiated the sale of the film to a distributor. Although Herbert Yates of Republic Pictures had an interest in the film, Corman says the only person willing to put up an advance against income was Robert Lippert. Monster from the Ocean Floor was sold to Lippert Pictures for $110,000. Gene Corman later said that Lippert renegotiated his deal on the film once he found out that Roger Corman had not spent $100,000 on making it, but considerably less.

Roger Corman says he ultimately received a $60,000 advance for Monster, which enabled him to make his next film.

== Reception ==
=== Box office ===
The film grossed $850,000. Variety put this figure at $185,000.

=== Critical ===
TV Guide found the movie lacking and criticized the directing; however, it found the movie interesting historically as the "beginning of something big and cheap". Variety was kinder, calling the movie a well made quickie.

The Creature Features Movie Guide by John Stanley gave the movie a mostly negative review citing minimal mood, the film's dubbing and a cast of unknowns.

Moria Science Fiction, Horror and Fantasy Film Review found the movie slow, dull and prosaic, but found it was worthwhile as the first of Corman's films. It did note that the speech on undersea farming was interesting and that Corman's famed penny pinching was on display in the movie. It also stated that the underwater scenes were well done.

The Encyclopedia of Science Fiction found it to be a minor film that was moderately successful, and found its depiction of a capable heroine noteworthy for the time.

While Roger Ebert was not fond of the film, he noted it was the start of Corman as an auteur not just a low budget film maker, and therefore is a part of Corman's legacy.
