= William Green (action painter) =

British painter (1934–2001)

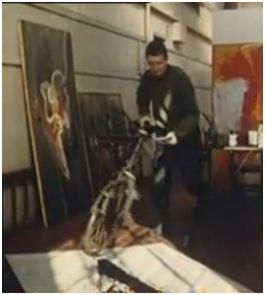

William Green (1934 – 28 January 2001) was a British who achieved attention in the late 1950s as a practitioner of Action painting. His work became known following a documentary film featuring his creation paintings by riding a bicycle over a surface saturated with bitumen. From about 1965, Green withdrew from the art scene as a reaction to negative publicity. He resumed his work in 1995. One of his works is in Tate Modern.

== Early life ==
Green was born in Greenwich, London, in 1934. After leaving school he worked in the drawing office of an architect in Sidcup, Kent. He then studied at Sidcup School of Art from 1952 to 1954, and there he made his first use of bitumen paint after discovering an old tin in his garden shed.

Green was accepted for the RCA in 1954, but as a conscientious objector to National Service, he was imprisoned from January 1955 for three months so was unable to join immediately. At the RCA, Green was in John Minton's tutorial group, and influenced by Expressionism.

== Artistic career ==
Early in 1956, the exhibition Modern Art in the United States opened at the Tate Gallery, and included works by Abstract Expressionist artists, including Green. He had already been strongly influenced by reproductions he had seen of works by Jackson Pollock and made a conscious decision to be a non-figurative painter. From then on, he followed Pollock's example and worked on the floor, treating the paintings as his "arena" and using ever larger sheets of hardboard instead of canvas. Since late 1955, he had gradually eliminated colour from his paintings, and in spring 1956 he decided to only make black bitumen paintings, with their monochrome surfaces subjected to increasingly more brutal gestures and mark-making, including attack by fire.

In 1957, Green was approached by Lawrence Alloway and included in "New Trends in British Art" at the Rome-New York Art Foundation. Another of Green's paintings, Napoleon's Chest at Moscow was included in "Dimensions, British Abstract Art 1948-1957". During the winter of 1957/58, Green taught at a working men's college, making abstract etchings and experimenting with nitric acid on the metal plates as he was attracted by the possibilities of using acid to further traumatise the surface of his paintings. In 1958 Green was included in "Five Painters at the ICA", "Young Contemporaries No 9" and "Six Young Contemporaries".

In 1960, Green exhibited in the significant first "Situation" exhibition. He was then teaching at Luton with John Plumb, and they were invited by the Skoob Group of artists from Cambridge University to make a joint work in front of a large audience. Green was also invited by students at St Martin's School of Art to give a demonstration of his own brand of action painting.

Through his fellow artist Tony Messenger, Green met the photographer and film-maker Ken Russell. Russell made a series of photographs and the film that was to make Green's name. Green was seen making action paintings by hurling bitumen and paraffin at a primed sheet of board before cycling across the picture, skidding over it in plimsolls and finally scorching the surface with fire. Green became known around the world, attracting a level of attention that made him among the most talked-about artists in Britain. His working methods were lampooned by Tony Hancock in the film The Rebel (1961).

In the early 1960s, Green became a tutor at the Walthamstow School of Art. He produced a work in the central courtyard which he finally set on fire - the smoke rose to the top of the building while students watched from the windows on every floor.

== Later life ==
By 1965, Green had withdrawn completely from the art scene, to some extent as a result of negative publicly his work had attracted. His brief marriage had ended in the early 1960s and his son had been adopted by his ex-wife's new husband.

Green returned to Sidcup in 1967 where he worked full-time at Havering Technical College until 1981 when he retired from teaching. When a student asked if he was the same William Green that he had read about in a book on Pop Art, he replied enigmatically "William Green is a very common name."

In 1995, Green started to paint again, taking up where he left off many years before. His first new works were made on paper, but he soon ordered large sheets of board and cans of bitumen and began to work outside the house, incorporating the effects of rain and fire on the surfaces of his black paintings. The results were shown at The Susan Hayward Exhibition at England & Co in London in 1993. Green was also featured in an exhibition at the Barbican in 1993, The Sixties Art Scene in London, and in the book of the same title. The BBC made a documentary about Green for The Late Show that was shown around the same time.

Green continued to paint every day and systematically sawed up and destroyed almost all his furniture and house contents, with the resulting debris incorporated in vast black bitumen-covered paintings. A group of these late works was exhibited in the Gardner Arts Centre at Sussex University in 1999, where he had been the subject of a previous exhibition, in 1964.

Green died on 28 January 2001, aged 66 or 67.
