= Carry On Jack =

1964 British comedy film by Gerald Thomas

- Original UK quad poster
- Directed by: Gerald Thomas
- Written by: Talbot Rothwell
- Produced by: Peter Rogers
- Starring: Kenneth Williams; Bernard Cribbins; Juliet Mills; Charles Hawtrey; Donald Houston; Cecil Parker
- Cinematography: Alan Hume
- Edited by: Archie Ludski
- Music by: Eric Rogers
- Production company: Peter Rogers Productions
- Distributed by: Anglo-Amalgamated; Warner-Pathé Distributors
- Release date: 23 February 1964
- Running time: 91 mins
- Country: United Kingdom
- Language: English
- Budget: £152,000

Carry On Jack is a 1964 British comedy film, the eighth in the series of 31 Carry On films (1958–1992). Most of the usual Carry On team are missing from this film: only Kenneth Williams and Charles Hawtrey appear throughout, with Jim Dale making a cameo appearance as a sedan chair carrier. Bernard Cribbins makes the first of his three appearances in a Carry On. Juliet Mills, Donald Houston and Cecil Parker make their only Carry On appearances in this film. Carry On Jack was the second of the series to be filmed in colour and the first Carry On film with a historical setting and period costumes.

As with its immediate predecessor, the script for Carry on Jack started off as a non-Carry On film (originally entitled Up the Armada) and after a number of title changes was incorporated into the series. The film was followed by Carry On Spying (1964).

== Plot ==
Before dying, Admiral Horatio Nelson says Britain needs a bigger navy with more men and then requests a kiss to Hardy. Meanwhile, Albert Poop-Decker has taken eight and half years and is still not qualified as midshipman, but is promoted by the First Sea Lord as England needs officers. He is to join the frigate HMS Venus at Plymouth. Arriving to find the crew celebrating as they are sailing tomorrow, he takes a sedan chair with no bottom (so he has to run), carried by a young man and his father to Dirty Dick's Tavern. Mobbed by women in the tavern as he is holding a sovereign aloft, he is rescued by serving maid Sally. She wants to go to sea to find her former lodger and childhood sweetheart Roger. Learning that Poop-Decker has not reported to his ship and is unknown to them, she knocks him out and takes his midshipman's uniform.

Poop-Decker wakes and dons a dress to cover his long johns, and downstairs, along with cess pit cleaner Walter Sweetly, is kidnapped by a press gang run by the Venus's First Officer Lieutenant Jonathan Howett and his bosun, Mr. Angel. They awake at sea and are introduced to Captain Fearless. Poop-Decker makes himself known, but there is already a Midshipman Poop-Decker aboard – Sally, in disguise. Poop-Decker, as a hopeless seaman, goes on to continually upset Howett by doing the wrong thing. Sally reveals her identity to Poop-Decker after he has been punished, and he decides to let things continue as they are. Eventually, Poop-Decker and Sally fall in love with each other.

After three months at sea and no action, the crew are restless, and when they finally see a Spanish ship, the Captain has them sail away from it. Howett and Angel hatch a plot, making it look as if the ship has been boarded by the enemy during a night raid and using Poop-Decker as a dupe to get the Captain leave the ship on his own volition. Poop-Decker, Sweetly and Sally help the Captain into a boat, and they leave the ship. However, while leaving his cabin, the Captain gets a splinter in his foot, which becomes gangrenous. Reaching dry land, Captain Fearless reckons that they are in France and only a short distance from Calais, while in fact they are in Spain. Sally and Poop-Decker spot a party of civilians and steal their clothes while they are bathing.

Now in charge of the ship, Howett and Angel sail for Cádiz and plan on taking it from Don Luis, the Spanish Governor. They are successful, but their plot is ruined by Poop-Decker's group, who stumble into Cádiz (believing it to be Le Havre) and recapture the Venus. Sailing back to England, they encounter a pirate ship, whose crew seizes the Venus. Pirate Captain Patch turns out to be Sally's lost love Roger, but upon seeing him as a brutal rogue, she no longer wants to have anything to do with him. In order to force her compliance, Patch and Hook try to make Poop-Decker and Fearless walk the plank. However, Poop-Decker escapes and cuts down a sail, which covers the pirates, capturing them.

In Cádiz, the former crew of the Venus are taken to be shot, but escape to England with five empty Spanish men-of-war. They are within sight of England when they encounter the Venus. While Poop-Decker, Sally and Walter are working belowdecks to amputate Fearless's infected leg, a fire gets out of control on deck and sets off the Venus's primed cannons, hitting all five Spanish ships and thwarting Howett. Poop-Decker and his companions are declared heroes by the Admiralty. Fearless, who now has a pegleg is promoted to Admiral and given a desk job. Poop-Decker and Sweetly are given the rank of honorary Captains, with pensions, but Poop-Decker reveals that he is going to leave the service to marry Sally.

== Background ==
The overall plot in relation to Sally steals the idea from episode 2 of the British TV series Sir Francis Drake made three years earlier (1961). In this episode a girl (the daughter of a ship's gunner) stows away on Drake's ship dressed as a man.

== Cast ==
- Kenneth Williams as Captain Fearless
- Bernard Cribbins as Midshipman Albert Poop-Decker
- Juliet Mills as Sally
- Charles Hawtrey as Walter Sweetley
- Percy Herbert as Mr Angel
- Donald Houston as First Officer Jonathan Howett
- Jim Dale as Carrier
- Cecil Parker as First Sea Lord
- Patrick Cargill as Spanish Governor
- Ed Devereaux as Hook
- Peter Gilmore as Patch (Roger)
- George Woodbridge as Ned
- Ian Wilson as Ancient carrier
- Jimmy Thompson as Nelson
- Anton Rodgers as Hardy
- Michael Nightingale as Town Crier
- Frank Forsyth as Second Sea Lord
- John Brooking as Third Sea Lord
- Barrie Gosney as Coach driver
- Jan Mazurus as Spanish Captain
- Viviane Ventura as Spanish secretary
- Marianne Stone as Peg
- Sally Douglas as Girl at Dirty Dicks (uncredited)
- Dorinda Stevens as Girl at Dirty Dicks (uncredited)
- Jennifer Hill as Girl at Dirty Dicks (uncredited)
- Rosemary Manley as Girl at Dirty Dicks (uncredited)
- Dominique Don as Girl at Dirty Dicks (uncredited)
- Marian Collins as Girl at Dirty Dicks (uncredited)
- Jean Hamilton as Girl at Dirty Dicks (uncredited)

== Crew ==
- Screenplay – Talbot Rothwell
- Music – Eric Rogers
- Art Director – Jack Shampan
- Director of Photography – Alan Hume
- Editor – Archie Ludski
- Associate Producer – Frank Bevis
- Assistant Director – Anthony Waye
- Camera Operator – Godfrey Godar
- Sound Editor – Christopher Lancaster
- Sound Recordist – Bill Daniels
- Unit Manager – Donald Toms
- Make-up Artists – Geoffrey Rodway & Jim Hydes
- Continuity – Penny Daniels
- Hairdressing – Olga Angelinetta
- Costume Designer – Joan Ellacott
- Technical Advisor – Ian Cox
- Producer – Peter Rogers
- Director – Gerald Thomas

== Filming and locations ==
- Filming dates: 2 September – 26 October 1963

Interiors:

- Pinewood Studios, Buckinghamshire

Exteriors:

- Frensham Pond. The background to the scenes with HMS Venus on fire and "firing" on the other ships is Kimmeridge Bay, Dorset.

== Reception ==
Kinematograph Weekly called the film a "money maker" for 1964.

== Bibliography ==
- Davidson, Andy (2012). Carry On Confidential. London: Miwk. ISBN 978-1908630018.
- Sheridan, Simon (2011). Keeping the British End Up – Four Decades of Saucy Cinema. London: Titan Books. ISBN 978-0857682796.
- Webber, Richard (2009). 50 Years of Carry On. London: Arrow. ISBN 978-0099490074.
- Hudis, Norman (2008). No Laughing Matter. London: Apex. ISBN 978-1906358150.
- Keeping the British End Up: Four Decades of Saucy Cinema by Simon Sheridan (third edition) (2007) (Reynolds & Hearn Books)
- Ross, Robert (2002). The Carry On Companion. London: Batsford. ISBN 978-0713487718.
- Bright, Morris; Ross, Robert (2000). Mr Carry On – The Life & Work of Peter Rogers. London: BBC Books. ISBN 978-0563551836.
- Rigelsford, Adrian (1996). Carry On Laughing – a celebration. London: Virgin. ISBN 1-85227-554-5.
- Hibbin, Sally & Nina (1988). What a Carry On. London: Hamlyn. ISBN 978-0600558194.
- Eastaugh, Kenneth (1978). The Carry On Book. London: David & Charles. ISBN 978-0715374030.
