= The Pot Carriers =

1962 film

- British quad poster by Tom Chantrell
- Directed by: Peter Graham Scott
- Screenplay by: T.J Morrison; Mike Watts
- Produced by: Gordon Scott
- Starring: Ronald Fraser; Paul Massie; Carole Lesley
- Cinematography: Erwin Hillier
- Music by: Stanley Black
- Release date: 18 May 1962 (UK)
- Running time: 84 minutes
- Country: United Kingdom
- Language: English

The Pot Carriers is a 1962 British comedy-drama film directed by Peter Graham Scott and produced by Gordon Scott for ABPC. The film stars Ronald Fraser, Paul Massie, Carole Lesley and Dennis Price. The film is largely set in Wandsworth prison and is a remake of the ITV Play of the Week, The Pot Carriers (1960), which writer Mike Watts based on his prison experiences. The film is about a young prisoner called Rainbow as he struggles to adjust to his first stretch behind bars.

== Cast ==
- Ronald Fraser as Red Band
- Paul Massie as Rainbow
- Carole Lesley as Wendy
- Dennis Price as Smooth Tongue
- Paul Rogers as Governor
- Davy Kaye as Mouse
- Eddie Byrne as Chief Officer Bailey
- Campbell Singer as Prison Officer Mott
- Alfred Burke as Lang
- Patrick McAlinney as Dillon
- Neil McCarthy as Bracket
- Vanda Godsell as Mrs. Red Band
- David Davies as Prison Officer Tom
- David Ensor as Judge
- Keith Faulkner as young prisoner
- Norman Chappell as prisoner Robert
- Alister Williamson as Escorting Prison Officer
- Charles Morgan as Chief Disciplinary Prison Officer
- Martin Wyldeck as Prison Officer Mullins
- Richard Shaw as Prison Officer Willis
- Clifford Earl as Prison Officer (Kitchen)
- Bruce Seton as Prison Officer I / C Cell Block
- John Tate as Prison Officer I / C Visiting Room
- Windsor Davies as Police Constable
- Frank Pettitt as van driver
- Sidney Vivian as bus conductor
- Douglas Muir as Court Usher

== Critical reception ==
The Monthly Film Bulletin wrote: "A nouvelle vague-influenced opening of Paul Massie striding along London streets to a pounding jazzy score (in shakily matched exterior shots) and the sharply observed prison routines and settings, lead one to hope for more than the conventional comedy-drama which emerges. The comedy scenes are brisk, however, and engagingly played by Ronald Fraser and Davy Kaye; uneasily hitched to some superficial social moralising about the degradation of prison life and the difficulty of going straight, they keep the interest and amusement going over the more embarrassing moments of self-sacrifice and home-spun philosophising."

TV Guide gave the film 3 out of 5 stars, writing "Script and direction take a personable view of prison life, showing the prisoners as individuals. Though the picture is filled with humorous moments, underneath is the continual feeling of the degradation and humiliation the prisoners must endure."

David McGillivray in the Radio Times also rated the film 3/5 stars, describing it as "Part social drama, part knockabout comedy, this is an odd but entertaining account of British prison life in the 1950s" and concluded that "the depiction of repetitive prison routine (the title refers to the detested practice of 'slopping out') still has an impact".
