= Paul Massie =

Canadian actor and academic (1932–2011)

- Born: Arthur Dickinson Massé; July 7, 1932; St. Catharines, Ontario, Canada
- Died: June 8, 2011 (aged 78); Liverpool, Nova Scotia, Canada
- Occupations: Actor; Academic
- Years active: 1958–1998
- Known for: The Two Faces of Dr. Jekyll

Paul Massie (born Arthur Dickinson Massé; July 7, 1932 – June 8, 2011) was a Canadian actor and academic. He later became a theater professor for the University of South Florida during the 1970s. He remained with the faculty until his retirement as professor emeritus in 1996.

Massie won a BAFTA Award in 1959 for Most Promising Newcomer for his role in the Anthony Asquith movie Orders to Kill (1958) in which he played an American bomber pilot in Nazi-occupied France. Also in 1958 he acted in the Peter Hall production of Tennessee Williams' play Cat on a Hot Tin Roof at the Comedy Theatre in London, with Kim Stanley and Leo McKern also in the cast.

Massie played the characters of Dr Jekyll and Mr Hyde for the 1960 Hammer horror movie The Two Faces of Dr. Jekyll. Unusually, he played Jekyll in make-up as an older bearded man, and his villainous counterpart Hyde as his young, handsome self. He also appeared in the thriller movie Sapphire (1959), and The Rebel (1961), featuring British comedian Tony Hancock, as a young actor. His later movies included the British comedies Raising the Wind (1961) and The Pot Carriers (1962).

In 1963, he acted in William Fairchild's play Breaking Point, at the Golders Green Hippodrome, London with John Gregson, fellow Canadian Robert Beatty, and Robert Ayres in the cast. John Barron was director.

In 1965 he appeared in the second episode of the fourth series of the 1960s British television spy seriesThe Avengers. For the episode, entitled "The Gravediggers", he played the villainous character Dr. Johnson. In 1973, he starred in the title role of the 5-part BBC-TV miniseries Hawkeye, the Pathfinder.

Later Massie changed his career to teaching, and became a member of the faculty at the University of South Florida in Tampa, where he had often been a guest artist-instructor over the years, first appearing in a 1966 production of Tartuffe. He taught acting, scene study, voice production, clowning, directing and other subjects. He also directed numerous productions at USF.

Paul Massie died on June 8, 2011, in Liverpool, Nova Scotia, at the age of 78. He had resided on the south shore of Nova Scotia since his retirement from USF in 1996.

== Filmography ==
Year	Title	Role	Notes
1957	High Tide at Noon	Sailor	Uncredited
1958	Orders to Kill	Gene Summers	
1959	Sapphire	David Harris	
1959	Libel	Jeffrey Buckenham	
1960	The Two Faces of Dr. Jekyll	Dr. Henry Jekyll / Mr. Edward Hyde	
1961	The Rebel	Paul Ashby	
1961	Raising the Wind	Malcolm Stewart	
1962	The Pot Carriers	Rainbow	
1970	Docteur Caraïbes	Denniger	
1991	Sam & Me	Cop two	
1995	The Naked Eye	Davis Parks	
