= Girls at Sea (1958 film) =

1958 British film by Gilbert Gunn

- British film poster
- Directed by: Gilbert Gunn
- Written by: T.J. Morrison
- Based on: the play The Middle Watch by Stephen King-Hall & Ian Hay
- Produced by: Vaughan N. Dean; Gilbert Gunn
- Starring: Guy Rolfe; Alan White; Anne Kimbell; Michael Hordern; Ronald Shiner
- Cinematography: Erwin Hillier
- Edited by: Edward B. Jarvis
- Music by: Laurie Johnson
- Production company: Associated British Picture Corporation
- Distributed by: Associated British-Pathé (UK)
- Release date: October 1958 (UK)
- Running time: 80 minutes
- Country: United Kingdom
- Language: English

Girls At Sea is a 1958 British comedy film directed by Gilbert Gunn and starring Guy Rolfe, Ronald Shiner, Alan White, Michael Hordern and Anne Kimbell. It was based on the 1930 play The Middle Watch by Ian Hay and Stephen King-Hall, previously filmed as The Middle Watch in 1930 and under the same title in 1940.

== Plot ==
Officers throw an extravagant party on board the battleship HMS Scotia when it visits the French Riviera. At the end of the night, the final shore-boat is judged unseaworthy, and three attractive female guests, Mary, Jill and Antoinette, must spend the night on board ship. But before they can be escorted ashore the next day, the battleship is called out on manoeuvres off the coast of Italy. Having no choice but to take the women along, Captain Maitland must hide the girls' presence from the admiral.

== Cast ==
- Guy Rolfe as Captain Alwin Maitland
- Ronald Shiner as Marine Ogg
- Alan White as Commander
- Michael Hordern as Admiral Reginald Victor Hewitt
- Anne Kimbell as Mary Carlton
- Nadine Tallier as Antoinette
- Fabia Drake as Lady Kitty Hewitt
- Mary Steele as Jill Eaton
- Richard Coleman as Captain Robert "Bobby" Randall
- Lionel Jeffries as Harry, The Tourist
- Teddy Johnson as Singer
- Daniel Massey as Flag Lieutenant Courtney
- David Lodge as Corporal Duckett
- Warren Mitchell as Arthur
- Michael Ripper as "Jumper", Marine
- Mercy Haystead as Claudine
- Brian Wilde as Bill
- Harold Goodwin as Wal
- David Aylmer as Navigating Officer
- Richard Briers as "Popeye" Lewis

== Critical reception ==
The Monthly Film Bulletin wrote: "The Middle Watch, a stock repertory farce by Ian Hay and Stephen King-Hall, had a few amusing moments, but loses most of them in transit to the screen. Michael Hordern, as the irascible Admiral, wins a partial victory over his material, as he frenziedly attempts to open a series of locked doors. The rest of the film laboriously hammers home comic clichés, shot, as if to emphasise its stage origins, against a studio background of stationary clouds."

The Radio Times wrote: "The 1940s film version of the stage farce The Middle Watch, which starred Jack Buchanan, was pretty bad, but beside this tepid remake it looks like a comedy classic. The cast does its level best to pep up the tired material ... Ronald Shiner is cheeky and Michael Hordern is absent-mindedly authoritarian, but Guy Rolfe is as wooden as a figurehead, while all the girls get to do is rush around in a state of undress. Try another form of naval gazing instead."

TV Guide called it "An amusing comedy."

Allmovie noted, "Michael Hordern has some dryly amusing moments as the hapless Admiral."

British film critic Leslie Halliwell said: "Vulgarized remake of The Middle Watch."
