= Gilbert Gunn =

British screenwriter and film director (1905–1967)

- Born: 24 March 1905; Crossmyloof, Glasgow, Scotland
- Died: 6 December 1967 (aged 62); Finchley, London, England
- Years active: 1930s–1965
- Spouse: Grace

Gilbert Gunn (24 March 1905 – 6 December 1967) was a British screenwriter and film director. He was known for his films The Elstree Story (1952), Girls at Sea (1958), and Operation Bullshine (1959).

== Career ==
Gunn worked as a playwright and theatrical producer in the 1930s, and then joined the Associated British Picture Corporation as screenwriter. In the 1940s he directed over 50 short documentaries for organisations including the Ministry of Information, the Central Office of Information and the British Council.

== Filmography ==
=== Screenwriter ===
- Save a Little Sunshine (1938)
- Me and My Pal (1939)
- The Door with Seven Locks (1940) a.k.a. Chamber of Horrors
- Landfall (1949)

=== Director, short documentaries (partial list) ===
- Royal Observer Corps (1941)
- Birth of a Tank (1942)
- The Owner Goes Aloft (1942)
- Is Your Journey Really Necessary? (1942)
- Women Away From Home (1942)
- Doing Without (1943)
- Firewatch Dog (1943)
- Canteen Command (1943)
- Order of Lenin (1943)
- Tyneside Story (1943)
- Out Working (1944)
- The Star and the Sand (1945)
- Routine Job: A Story of Scotland Yard (1946)
- Country Policeman (1946)
- Return to Action (1947)
- The Centuries Between (1949)
- Beethoven or Boogie (1949)

=== Director, features ===
- Elstree Story (1952), also screenplay
- Valley of Song (1953)
- The Good Beginning (1953)
- My Wife's Family (1956), also co-writer
- The Mark of the Hawk (1957), assistant director
- Girls at Sea (1958)
- The Strange World of Planet X (1958)
- Operation Bullshine (1959), also co-writer
- What a Whopper (1961)
- Wings of Mystery (1963), also co-writer

=== Director, short instructional films ===
- Golf For All (1965, 7 films)

=== Actor ===
- The Farmer's Wife (1941) as pub pianist

== Television ==
- The Young Detectives (1963, 8 episodes)
