= Woman in a Dressing Gown =

1957 British film by J. Lee Thompson

- Advertising poster
- Directed by: J. Lee Thompson
- Written by: Ted Willis
- Based on: TV play by Willis
- Produced by: Frank Godwin; J. Lee Thompson
- Starring: Yvonne Mitchell; Anthony Quayle; Sylvia Syms; Carole Lesley
- Cinematography: Gilbert Taylor
- Edited by: Richard Best
- Music by: Louis Levy
- Production company: Godwin-Willis Productions
- Distributed by: Associated British-Pathé
- Release date: June 1957
- Running time: 93 minutes
- Country: United Kingdom
- Language: English
- Budget: £99,000
- Box office: £450,000 (UK) £1 million (total)

Woman in a Dressing Gown is a 1957 British drama film directed by J. Lee Thompson and starring Yvonne Mitchell, Anthony Quayle, Sylvia Syms, and Carole Lesley.

The screenplay was written by Ted Willis, based on his 1956 ITV Television Playhouse play of the same name. The producer was Frank Godwin who called it "the first kitchen sink movie".

The film concerns a man who is having an extramarital affair and considers divorce, and his wife's reaction to the affair. Scenes compare and contrast the man's relationship with his wife versus his relationship with his lover. These are not only very different in content, but very different in film style, shots with his lover being in extreme close-up and/or unusually framed shots. Shots of the wife are mainly in wide angle, encompassing the chaotic mess of her house.

The film is considered an example of British social realism, and a prototypical version of kitchen sink realism.

== Plot ==
The Prestons are an apparently happy household made up of wife Amy, husband Jim and teenage son Brian, living in a cramped flat on a London housing estate. Amy, rarely gets dressed and is always seen wearing her dressing gown

However, tensions soon become clear. Although she has a breezy, loving character, Amy is a disorganised housewife. She finds it difficult to concentrate enough to tidy or cook properly. Jim is having an affair with a colleague, Georgie, who threatens to break it off unless Jim divorces his wife and leaves his family. He promises that he will do so, and eventually demands a divorce. Amy is shocked and distraught, but vows to improve herself. She borrows ten shillings from her son (who is in his first job) and pawns her engagement ring for three pounds. She then gets her hair done and buys a half bottle of whisky for Jim. She has phoned Jim at work and told him to bring Georgie home. Her plan is foiled when heavy rain ruins her new hair. She gets home looking worse than ever. She pulls her best dress out of storage but rips it putting it on. Her neighbour arrives and they start drinking the whisky. Amy gets drunk and ruins the table.

Brian finds her drunk and becomes angry with his father when he brings Georgie to the house. Jim slaps Brian, who leaves.

After a confrontation Amy orders Jim and Georgie out of the flat. Jim leaves, but has second thoughts. He tells Georgie it won't work and returns to his wife who is lovingly packing his case. She vows to get rid of her dressing gown.

== Cast ==
- Yvonne Mitchell as Amy Preston
- Anthony Quayle as Jim Preston
- Sylvia Syms as Georgie Harlow
- Andrew Ray as Brian Preston
- Carole Lesley as Hilda
- Michael Ripper as pawnbroker
- Nora Gordon as Mrs. Williams
- Marianne Stone as hairdresser
- Olga Lindo as manageress
- Harry Locke as wine merchant
- Max Butterfield as Harold
- Roberta Woolley as Christine
- Melvyn Hayes as newsboy
- Cordelia Mitchell as Hilda's baby

== Production ==
The play was seen by film director J. Lee Thompson who approached Ted Willis and suggested they turn it into a film. Thompson and Willis formed a company with Frank Godwin, and they did a deal with Robert Clark at Associated British. Associated British agreed to finance the film, the writer, producer and director agreed to defer half their fees and the company would take one-third of worldwide profits.

According to Godwin, Joan Miller, who was in the original TV play, was offered a role at Stratford and was unable to reprise her performance. So it was decided to cast Yvonne Mitchell who had worked with Thompson in Yield to the Night.

The film was shot over eight weeks in early 1957. The mobile Arriflex camera was used.

== Reception ==
=== Box office ===
The film was one of the most popular at the British box office in 1957. According to Kinematograph Weekly the film was "in the money" at the British box office in 1957.

Godwin says the film got into profit by a sale to the USSR of £10,000.

According to Willis the film earned £450,000 during its original run and eventually took £1 million. However Associated British said costs of promotion and distribution meant there were no profits. In 1961 J. Lee Thompson said the film lost money. Nonetheless, the same team then filmed another play by Willis No Trees on the Street.

=== Critical ===
The Monthly Film Bulletin wrote:

A British film which attempts to state a serious human problem, setting it in an authentic lower middle-class milieu, must be saluted for its initiative, even if its impact, already endangered by miscasting, is diluted by indecisive direction. Ted Willis' script – uninspired but unquestionably sincere – is adapted from his own television play; and it is the sort of intimate drama which has been successfully transferred from television to cinema in America. But Willis has not the Chayevsky touch; and he has been, moreover, unlucky in his collaborators. The director was presumably aiming at a mood of tragi-comedy; but continual over-emphasis pushes the comedy close to farce; and, consequently, there is difficulty in establishing the pathetic scenes. Yvonne Mitchell's undisciplined performance adds to the general lack of balance. Foolish, frowzy Amy is quite outside her range, and her fidgety gestures and character "business" cannot conceal her limitations. Even the accent is beyond her; at every dramatic moment she slips from Balham to Belgravia. Only in one or two of the quieter moments does she manage to make the part effective. Anthony Quayle is also cast against type, and it is to his credit that the dilemma of the weak, bewildered husband is transmitted with real compassion. Sylvia Syms and Andrew Ray play with understanding and restraint. The facile ending, with its suggestion of "happy ever after", is in line with the compromising attitude of the film as a whole; and rings entirely false.

Variety said the film "had good b.o. [box office] possibilities."

The New York Times said "Paddy Chayefsky would love it."

Jean-Luc Godard wrote "One really has to rack one’s brains to find anything to say about a British film. One wonders why. But that’s the way it is. And there isn’t even an exception to prove the rule. Especially not Woman in a Dressing-gown anyhow, in spite of its acting prize? at the recent Berlin Festival. That just goes to show that the Germans have no idea either... From beginning to end the film is an incredible debauch of camera movements as complex as they are silly and meaningless."

On the film's re-release on in 2012, Peter Bradshaw, in a five star review for The Guardian wrote that the film's "proto-kitchen-sink drama goes all the way where Brief Encounter loitered hesitantly ... and unlike David Lean's film, this one shows people saying the relevant things out loud. An unmissable rerelease."

Melanie Williams for the BFI Screenonline noted "an important reminder that postwar British realism did not begin with the New Wave, and that the 1950s were not devoid of socially engaged cinema, as is sometimes suggested. Indeed, in the field of gender politics, one could argue that this film is considerably more progressive than the New Wave that superseded it, in its focus on the travails of a middle-aged housewife rather than those of a virile young man."

Leslie Halliwell said: "Classic British TV play adequately filmed but now rather dated and irritating."

In British Sound Films: The Studio Years 1928 as 1959 David Quinlan rated the film as "very good", writing: "Superior kitchen-sink soaper whose power overcomes even the casting of upper-class stars in working-class roles."

The Radio Times Guide to Films gave the film 4/5 stars, writing: "This painfully honest drama, based on a play by Ted Willis, was light years ahead of its time in its treatment of women and their place in marriage. Yvonne Mitchell stars in a role that should have seen her showered in awards. Her portrayal of clinical depression is stunning in its depth and understanding, and director J Lee Thompson pulls no punches in his exploration of a partnership gone sour with the intrusion of a younger woman. In many ways this movie heralded a new dawn in gritty British film-making which culminated in the "kitchen sink" social dramas of the 1960s"

== Awards ==
The film won four awards at the 7th Berlin International Film Festival including the first ever FIPRESCI Prize and a special mention for "Best Foreign Film". Mitchell won the Silver Bear for Best Actress. The film also won the 1958 Golden Globe Award for Best English-Language Foreign Film.

== Stage play ==
Willis later adapted the script into a successful stage play. It debuted in Australia with Googie Withers and was hugely popular, then later went to England.
