= Doctor in Love =

1960 British film by Ralph Thomas

- Original British 1960 quad film poster
- Directed by: Ralph Thomas
- Screenplay by: Nicholas Phipps
- Based on: Doctor in Love by Richard Gordon
- Produced by: Betty E. Box
- Starring: James Robertson Justice; Michael Craig; Leslie Phillips; Virginia Maskell; Carole Lesley
- Cinematography: Ernest Steward
- Edited by: Alfred Roome
- Music by: Bruce Montgomery
- Production company: Rank Organisation
- Distributed by: Rank Film Distributors
- Release date: 12 July 1960
- Country: United Kingdom
- Language: English

Doctor in Love is a 1960 British comedy film, the fourth of the seven films in the Doctor series, directed by Ralph Thomas and starring James Robertson Justice and Michael Craig. It was the first film in the series not to feature Dirk Bogarde, although he did return for the next film in the series Doctor in Distress. It was loosely based on the 1957 novel of the same title by Richard Gordon.

== Plot ==
Dr Richard Hare is a recently graduated medical intern at St Swithins Hospital. When his new romantic interest, nurse Sally Nightingale, suddenly leaves the hospital, he is devastated. He also leaves after being offered a job in private practice. But when his senior partner, Dr Cardew, has to visit California for a few months, Hare is left in charge.

He is joined by Dr Tony Burke who proceeds to airily order expensive equipment that the practice cannot afford but leaves the practice after breaking an arm. Dr Nicola Barrington joins the practice and Hare is suddenly in love again. The romance doesn't go well, especially when Sally re-appears and takes the job of practice secretary and eventually Nicola leaves.

Hare struggles through various comedic and other complications, mainly stemming from Burke's amorous attentions to female patients.

After enlisting Sir Lancelot Spratt's assistance to save a young dying boy, he diagnoses Spratt with appendicitis and decides to operate, despite Spratt's loud objections. He objects even more when Dr Burke fills in at the last moment as the anaesthetist. Despite Spratt's vociferous protestations, the operation is a success.

Hare is reunited with Nicola and returns to St Swithins.

== Main cast ==
- James Robertson Justice as Sir Lancelot Spratt
- Michael Craig as Dr. Richard Hare
- Leslie Phillips as Dr. Tony Burke
- Virginia Maskell as Dr. Nicola Barrington
- Carole Lesley as Kitten Strudwick
- Joan Sims as Dawn
- Liz Fraser as Leonora
- Reginald Beckwith as Wildewinde
- Nicholas Phipps as Dr. Clive Cardew
- Ambrosine Phillpotts as Lady Spratt
- Irene Handl as Professor MacRitchie
- Fenella Fielding as Mrs. Tadwich
- Nicholas Parsons as Dr. Roger Hinxman
- Moira Redmond as Sally Nightingale
- Ronnie Stevens as Harold Green
- Michael Ward as Dr. Flower
- John Le Mesurier as Dr. Mincing
- Meredith Edwards as father
- Avis Bunnage as Mrs. Mimp (uncredited)
- Esma Cannon as Raffia Lady (uncredited)
- Patrick Cargill as car salesman (uncredited)
- Bill Fraser as police sergeant (uncredited)
- Joan Hickson as sister (uncredited)
- John Junkin as policeman (uncredited)
- Rosalind Knight as doctor (uncredited)
- Roland Curram as student doctor (uncredited)
- Sheila Hancock as librarian (uncredited)
- Robin Ray as doctor (uncredited)
- Norman Rossington as doorman (uncredited)
- Peter Sallis as love-struck patient (uncredited)
- Marianne Stone as nurse (uncredited)
- Jimmy Thompson as doctor (uncredited)
- Sally Douglas as stripper (uncredited)
- Angela Browne as Susan (uncredited)
- Warren Mitchell as Haystack Club manager (uncredited)

== Production ==
Dirk Bogarde did not want to make any more Doctor films, so the filmmakers cast Michael Craig and Leslie Phillips as young doctors. Producer Betty Box later said the entire cast cost as much as Bogarde's current fee at that time. Craig said "it was no sweat, a bit like a mildly peasant piece of deja vu" because he had just worked with the same team on Upstairs and Downstairs. Box says "We all developed an affection for Doctor in Love. It was a gay, happy comedy which brought us into contact with some fine fresh talents."

Shooting took place at Pinewood Studios and on location around London including at University College London. The sets were designed by the art director Maurice Carter. The film features a visit to a striptease club.

Craig said "I don't think Doctor in Love's success had anything to do with me – King Kong probably could have played the part with the same result." Betty Box claimed it earned more than Doctor at Large. "We felt we'd pushed our luck to the ninth degree and should now forget about doctors and medical students", she said.

== Reception ==
=== Box office ===
The film was the most popular movie at the British box office in 1960.

=== Critical ===
Monthly Film Bulletin described the film as "an antediluvian farce of staggering witlessness and vulgarity".

Filmink argued the film "vindicated Rank’s loyalty to Michael Craig over the years – the studio had given him numerous leading roles for little box office return, but still held on to him even after they jettisoned other back-up Bogardes like Patrick McGoohan and Ronald Lewis, and Craig turned down roles in films like The Gentleman and the Gypsy."
