= The Rebel (1961 film) =

1961 British film by Robert Day

- Trade ad poster by Tom Chantrell
- Directed by: Robert Day
- Written by: Ray Galton and Alan Simpson; Tony Hancock
- Produced by: W.A. Whittaker
- Starring: Tony Hancock; George Sanders; Paul Massie; Margit Saad
- Cinematography: Gilbert Taylor
- Edited by: Richard Best
- Music by: Frank Cordell
- Production company: Associated British Picture Corporation
- Distributed by: Warner-Pathé Distributors
- Release date: 2 March 1961
- Running time: 105 minutes
- Country: United Kingdom
- Language: English

The Rebel (US title: Call Me Genius) is a 1961 British satirical comedy film directed by Robert Day and starring Tony Hancock. It was written by Ray Galton and Alan Simpson. The film concerns the clash between bourgeois and bohemian cultures.

== Plot ==
Anthony Hancock, a disaffected London office clerk, catches the train to Waterloo Station every morning. Each commuter wears a bowler hat and carries an umbrella. In the City, Hancock is one of many identical clerks in a dull office, but he 'rebels' by hanging his umbrella the opposite way to those of his colleagues. One day, his boss catches him drawing faces instead of working, and he is asked to produce his ledgers, which are full of poor quality caricatures.

Back at his mid-terraced Victorian house lodgings, Hancock dons his artist's smock and resumes work on "Aphrodite at the Waterhole", a horrendous and huge sculpture. His landlady Mrs Crevatte complains about the hammering noise. He explains he cannot afford a model, and it represents "women as I see them". Mrs Crevatte says in reply "Oh, you poor man!" She threatens to evict him if he does not remove the statue. As he remonstrates with his copy of Van Gogh's self-portrait on his wall, the statue crashes through the floor.

At a local cafe he orders a coffee "with no froth". This annoys the owner, who tells Hancock he has just bought an expensive froth-making machine. Inspired by a poster on the wall, Hancock decides to go to Paris. He takes a train to Dover with his Aphrodite on a wagon to the rear; she is decapitated as the train goes through a tunnel. At the port, Hancock is furious, but worse is to follow: while being loaded onto a ship, the statue bursts through the bottom of its net and is lost in the sea. On the ferry he throws his bowler hat and umbrella into the sea; unfortunately, it is raining heavily when he arrives in France.

In Paris, Hancock goes to a cafe in Montmartre and meets a group of English-speaking artists. He befriends Paul, who speaks passionately about art and invites Hancock to share his studio and flat. Hancock loves the atmosphere in the studio. He critiques Paul's paintings: "Your colours are the wrong shape", he says.

Paul admires the childlike style of Hancock's work: "infantile art". Josey, a red-haired, blue-lipped beatnik, visits and invites them to a very large mansion filled with artwork. Here the Dalí-esque owner, Jim Smith, sleeps on the bookcase because he is writing a book. A group of young people all dressed alike hang on Hancock's every word and think he is fantastic.

Inspired by Jim Smith, Hancock sleeps on top of his wardrobe and brings a cow to live in the flat. He tries his first action painting. A disillusioned Paul decides to leave and gifts Hancock his art.

As Hancock's reputation spreads, he is visited by Sir Charles Broward, an art collector and buyer, who notices and is attracted to Paul's work. Sir Charles asks Hancock if Paul's works are his, and Hancock says they were "a gift", which is misinterpreted. Hancock's own work is labelled awful. After the first exhibition, he goes to a posh restaurant with Sir Charles and orders egg and chips. When pushed to choose something more, he orders snails, egg and chips, and a cup of tea.

Sir Charles takes Hancock to Monte Carlo, where he has dinner with a number of rich guests. One woman, Mrs Carreras, wishes to be painted by Hancock. Her husband, after some debate, commissions a sculpture. Hancock injures his fingers while hammering, and later at dinner Mrs Carreras hand-feeds him. Carreras offers to buy Hancock's entire art collection for £50,000.

On the Carreras' yacht, Hancock dresses as a budgerigar for the fancy dress party. Mrs Carreras dresses as a cat. He rejects her advances, and she threatens to shoot him. On deck, he unveils the statue to everyone's horror—it is a copy of his Aphrodite—and Mrs Carreras accuses him of assaulting her. The statue drops through the ship, and Hancock escapes on the yacht's launch. Still dressed as a budgerigar, Hancock goes to the airport and says he wants to fly to London. "It's a long way to London, monsieur... you'd better wait for a plane," the attendant points out.

He returns to Mrs Crevatte's, finding Paul living with her and working in an office, though still painting as a hobby. Hancock persuades Paul to lend him some new paintings, promising to explain later. Showing these paintings at the London exhibition, Hancock reveals that Paul is the true artist and "the rubbish" is Hancock's work. Leaving Paul to enjoy his newfound fame and fortune, Hancock returns to Mrs Crevatte's and resumes work on his Aphrodite - with Mrs Crevatte as the model.

== Cast ==
- Tony Hancock as Anthony Hancock
- George Sanders as Sir Charles Broward
- Paul Massie as Paul
- Margit Saad as Margot
- Grégoire Aslan as Carreras
- Dennis Price as Jim Smith
- Irene Handl as Mrs Crevatte
- John Le Mesurier as office manager
- Liz Fraser as waitress
- Mervyn Johns as manager of art gallery
- Peter Bull as manager of art gallery
- Nanette Newman as Josey
- Marie Burke as Madame Laurent
- Oliver Reed as Artist in cafe
- Mario Fabrizi as coffee bar attendant
- Bernard Rebel as art dealer
- John Wood as poet
- Victor Platt as dockside official
- Neville Becker as artist

== Production and themes ==
The film was made by Associated British Picture Corporation and distributed by Warner-Pathé (ABPC's distribution arm).

The Rebel attempts to transfer Hancock's radio and television comedy persona to the big screen, and several regular supporting cast members of Hancock's Half Hour also appeared, including John Le Mesurier, Liz Fraser and Mario Fabrizi. The since-demolished railway station used at the beginning of the film, was Bingham Road in the Croydon suburb of Addiscombe, named Fortune Green South for the film.

The theme of railway station commuters' regimentation and dress codes had been depicted before. In his 1898 work "The Return", Joseph Conrad wrote: "Their backs appeared alike—almost as if they had been wearing a uniform". Hancock told the identically-dressed existentialists that before becoming one himself, he had worn a uniform as a commuter. The imagery was also used in 1952's Something Money Can't Buy, during Anthony Steel's daydreaming reverie sequence, working at the local government office.

In The Rebel, existentialist themes are explored by mocking Parisian intellectual life and portraying the pretensions of the English middle class. Galton and Simpson had previously satirised pseudo-intellectuals in the Hancock's Half Hour radio episode "The Poetry Society" (1959), in which Hancock attempts to imitate the style of the pretentious poets and fails, and is infuriated when his idiot friend Bill does the same and wins their enthusiastic approval.

The film also includes scenes parodying modern art. The scene showing Hancock splashing paint onto a canvas and riding a bike over it is a lampoon of the work of action painter William Green, while the childlike paintings of Hancock, referred to as the "infantile school" or the "shapeist school", parody the naive style.

In 2002, the London Institute of 'Pataphysics organised an exhibition consisting of recreations of all the art works seen in the film. There is still dispute whether the drawings and paintings, attributed to Hancock and his roommate, were all produced by Alistair Grant (1925–1997) or whether Hancock's poor quality "Infantilist School" artworks were actually produced as a joke by the British modernist painter John Bratby.

== Release and reception ==
The Rebel's British premiere was at the Plaza Cinema in London's West End on 2 March 1961, following a screening at the Beirut Film Festival.

=== Box office ===
According to the Motion Picture Herald, the film was the 6th most popular movie at the UK box office in 1961.

Kinematograph Weekly called the film a "money maker" at the British box office.

=== Critical ===
The Monthly Film Bulletin wrote: "Tony Hancock, the funniest of the television comedians, has made the dangerous transition to the larger screen rather more happily than most. The script, by his TV writers, keeps the element of brave fantasy, the conviction of unrecognised grandeur; and Hancock at work, chipping away at his appalling statue, squirting; paint with bland optimism over his action painting, is a fine figure. One misses, though, his anchor-man, the astringent Sidney James, and the whole background of down-at-heel respectability."

The Times, at the time of the film's British release, wrote that Hancock had "made the transition from small to large screen" in this film "with gratifying success".

Variety wrote: "The slideover from TV stardom to success on the bigger screen has been a hazardous one for many of Britain's television comedians. Tony Hancock, one of U.K.'s hottest TV comics, has waited his moment cautiously. Apart from a minor appearance in an unimportant farce some years ago, he has shuffled uneasily away from pix. But, with The Rebel, his takeover bid can be rated a reasonable success."

Bosley Crowther in The New York Times wrote: "Norman Wisdom can move over. The British have found a low comedian who is every bit as low as he is and even less comical ... many of the comedy gimmicks are familiar from other films".

The British Film Institute's Screenonline website wrote: "In this film, comic rebellion places artists as the antithesis of workers and there is a kind of lazy shorthand at work that conflates artists with Paris, existentialism, angry young men, beatniks and beat poets. Cod philosophical discussions of what art is about permeate the film, but this reflects the times accurately".

Galton and Simpson wrote in 2012 that the best review they ever received was from artist Lucian Freud who reportedly described it as the best film made about modern art.

== Accolades ==
Hancock was nominated for the BAFTA Award for Most Promising Newcomer to Leading Film Roles in 1962.

== Quotes ==
On Mrs. Crevatte seeing one of Hancock's pictures on the wall:

- Mrs. Crevatte: What's this 'orrible thing?
- Hancock: That, is a self-portrait.
- Mrs. Crevatte: ooh ov?
- Hancock: Laurel and Hardy!!

On Mrs. Crevatte first encountering Hancock's Aphrodite at the Waterhole

- Mrs. Crevatte: Here, have you been having models up here - have there been naked women in my establishment?
- Hancock: Of course there haven't. I can't afford thirty-bob an hour. I did that from memory. That is women as I see them.
- Mrs. Crevatte: Oh, you poor man!

The abstract expressionist painting scene:

- Hancock: It's worth 2000 quid of anybody's money that is!

A definition of Existentialism

- Josey: We only live in the present; there is no future. Why kill time when you can kill yourself?
- Upon seeing a young Clerk (a 'Reginald', he pejoratively conjectures), on the opposite railway carriage seat: If this train’s still running in 1980, he'll still be on it.

As he takes his leave of the Paris Art World at his final exhibition:

- Hancock: Ladies and gentlemen, I shall now bid you all good day. I'm off! I know what I was cut out to do and I should have done it long ago. YOU'RE ALL RAVING MAD!! None of you know what you're looking at. You wait 'til I'm dead, you'll see I was right!

== Home release ==
Using a new high definition 2K transfer, the film was released for the first time on Blu-ray in 2019 by Network Distributing Limited. The collector's edition came with a small facsimile copy of the script for The Day Off, which had been intended as Galton and Simpson's follow up film although it was never made.

== Novelization ==
Concurrent with the opening of the film, May Fair Books released a paperback novelization of the screenplay. It was By-lined "Alan Holmes", which was a pseudonym for Piccadilly Western novelist Gordon Landsborough.

== See also ==
- A Bucket of Blood (1959), American film about the Minimalist school of art.
