= Raising the Wind (1961 film) =

British comedy by Gerald Thomas

- DVD Cover
- Directed by: Gerald Thomas
- Written by: Bruce Montgomery
- Produced by: Peter Rogers
- Starring: James Robertson Justice; Leslie Phillips; Kenneth Williams
- Cinematography: Alan Hume
- Edited by: John Shirley
- Music by: Bruce Montgomery
- Distributed by: Anglo-Amalgamated
- Release date: 7 September 1961 (London)
- Running time: 91 minutes
- Country: United Kingdom
- Language: English

Raising the Wind (US: Roommates) is a 1961 British comedy film directed by Gerald Thomas and starring James Robertson Justice, Leslie Phillips, Kenneth Williams, Liz Fraser, Eric Barker and Sid James. The storyline, screenplay and musical score of the film were by Bruce Montgomery.

Raising the Wind uses a cast of actors drawn from the Carry On and Doctor films that were popular at the time, although it is not an official member of either series.

It is set in an elite music school. The title is typical British comedy double entendre of the period: normally connected to the act of belching, but here also referring to the woodwind section of an orchestra.

== Synopsis ==
Mervyn, Malcolm, Alex, Miranda and Jill are music students at the (fictional) London Academy of Music and the Arts. They decide to share a flat to pool their meagre grants and to find a place to practise. They suffer the put-downs of the acerbic Sir Benjamin Boyd, who conducts the student orchestra, and the antics of the other talented but eccentric teachers at the school.

To raise some much-needed funds, the group offer to play a string quintet recital, but it's a disaster, with instrument strings breaking all the time. More successfully, they play in several performances of Handel's Messiah.

Mervyn, a talented composer, writes a catchy tune and whilst drunk sells it for fifty pounds to Sid and Harry, advertising copywriters. Sober the next day, he realises that he has violated the terms of his grant; the two offer to sell it back to him for five hundred pounds, money he can't possibly raise. He then learns that the tune is an existing one, the 'Alexandra Waltz', which he probably remembered from his youth, so the true composer could theoretically sue the purchasers.

Some of the students go up for a prestigious scholarship, the test for which includes conducting a professional orchestra Sinfonia of London. Mervyn makes a reasonable effort with music by Nikolai Rimsky-Korsakov, but the supercilious know-it-all Harold annoys the musicians with constant criticism and they have their own back on him, with an over-fast rendition of Rossini's William Tell Overture.

To everyone's surprise, the scholarship is awarded to Miranda, but she confesses that she only wants to marry fellow student Mervyn, who likewise is in love with her. However, Malcolm is given a full time position in Sir Benjamin's orchestra (second trumpet) and proposes to Jill. Alex leaves school in order to study violin in Amsterdam.

== Cast ==
- James Robertson Justice as Sir Benjamin Boyd
- Leslie Phillips as Mervyn Hughes
- Paul Massie as Malcolm Stewart
- Kenneth Williams as Harold Chesney
- Liz Fraser as Miranda Kennaway
- Eric Barker as Dr. Morgan Rutherford
- Jennifer Jayne as Jill Clemons
- Jimmy Thompson as Alex Spendlove
- Sid James as Sid
- Esma Cannon as Mrs Deevens
- Geoffrey Keen as Sir John
- Jill Ireland as Janet
- Victor Maddern as removal man
- Lance Percival as Harry
- Joan Hickson as Mrs Bostwick
- David Lodge as taxi driver
- Ambrosine Phillpotts as Mrs Featherstone
- Brian Oulton as concert agent
- Christine Andres Coombs as violin player
- Leonard Hirsch as orchestra leader violin
- Jim Dale as cheeky young trombonist
- Ronald Waller as 1st bassoon in the final orchestral clip
- Eddie Wilson (Albert Edward Wilson) as 2nd bassoon in the final orchestra clip
- Dorinda Stevens as Doris

== Production ==
The producers of the film credit the Sinfonia of London for their assistance.

The exterior of the music school is filmed at University College, London, which also doubled for St Swithin's hospital in several of the Doctor films.

The recital section of the film was based on anecdotes told to Bruce Montgomery by Eric Coates about the formation of the Celtic String Quartet, who performed only one concert, beset by disasters.

== Release ==
The premiere took place on 24 August 1961 at the Plaza Theatre in London's Piccadilly Circus.

== Reception ==
=== Box office ===
The film was called a "money maker" at the British box office in 1961.

=== Critical reception ===
The Monthly Film Bulletin wrote: "The aging students are cut to the conventional pattern: including the leery scholar (Leslie Phillips), the apparently dumb blonde (Liz Fraser), the hard-working one (Paul Massie), the flip wise-cracker (Jimmy Thompson) and the nice girl (Jennifer Jayne). But the film achieves some moments of superior scat comedy, notably when Kenneth Williams irately conducts a mickey-taking orchestra. James Robertson Justice blusters to order and Eric Barker contrives a genuinely funny portrait of a muddle-minded composer."

The Radio Times Guide to Films gave the film 3/5 stars, writing: "Leslie Phillips stars in this laboured but likeable Geraid Thomas comedy as a penniless music student whose talent for writing pop songs while drunk jeopardises his scholarship at a top classical academy until gruff tutor James Robertson-Justice unexpectedly comes to his rescue. These accomplished funnymen go through their usual paces with aplomb, but the film belongs to the delightful Esma Cannon as a deaf landlady, Kenneth Williams as a toffee-nosed swot and Sidney James as the publisher behind Phillips's predicament."
