= Robert Clark (film executive) =

Scottish film executive (1904–1984)

Robert Clark (1904–1984) was a Scottish film executive best known for being head of production at Associated British Picture Corporation in the late 1940s and 1950s. It was a successful time for the company, films including The Dam Busters (1955).

Among Clark's achievements were negotiating a contract with Warner Bros, and signing Audrey Hepburn and Richard Todd to long-term contracts before they were stars. He also financed early films of J. Lee Thompson and Michael Anderson.

== Biography ==
Clark was born in 1904 in Paisley, the last of thirteen children in a working-class family. His parents were members of the religious order the Plymouth Brethren who were opposed to cinema going. Clark attended school until he was fourteen years old, then was articled to a solicitor in Glasgow, John Maxwell. While working, Clark also studied law at Glasgow University and became a full qualified solicitor.

Maxwell was interested in the film industry, buying up cinemas and establishing a Scottish production company, Waverly. He bought Elstree Studios and set up British International Pictures as well as forming Associated British cinema chain. In 1929 Maxwell brought Clark to London to work with him as his assistant.

After Maxwell's death in 1940, Elstree Studios were taken over by the government during the war. Clarke became a director of Associated British in 1945, and oversaw the re-activation of its film producing arm. According to film historians Sue Harper and Vince Porter, Clark was "determined to keep alive Maxwell's vision of a British company that could sustain a small but stable output of modestly budgeted indigenous films. He wanted ABPC to recover their costs in the UK, and keep its small roster of actors and studio technicians permanently employed."

In 1948, Clark became Executive in Charge of Production at Elstree.

In 1949, he announced ABPC would make ten films at a total cost of £2 million. He was heavily reliant on the choices of his scenario director, Frederick Gotfurt. Clark lost nearly £530,000 on production in his first two years in charge and recouped only £330,000 in distribution. He reduced production costs by remaking old company properties, co-financing with the NFFC and going into co productions.

According to writers Sue Harper and Vince Porter, the films in which Clark had the most personal interest were The Dam Busters (1955), The Good Companions (1957) and The Moonraker (1958).

In 1955 Clark had his own chain of cinemas, Caledonian Cinemas.

He was removed from his position as head of production in January 1958 after a series of clashes with Warner Bros and was replaced with C.J. Latta. Following his removal as Director of Production at Elstree Studios, Clark was appointed Chief Executive and Deputy Chairman of ABPC, a position he retained until the takeover of the group by EMI in 1969, a move fiercely opposed by Clark and most fellow directors.

Clark was chairman of the NFFC from 1970 to 1977.

Robert Clark also acquired a majority shareholding in the Inverness-based Caledonian Associated Cinemas Ltd, Scotland's biggest exhibition chain, and remained Chairman of this group until his death.

Clark made most of his fortune from property investment, which he did as a sideline.

== Appraisal ==
Sue Harper and Vince Porter wrote he "brought to film production the traditional qualities of the successful Lowland Scot—organizing ability, hard work, knowledge of finance, and disinterested service to the community." They argued his "Scottish sensibilities different from those of the cosmopolitan Jews and middle-class Englishmen who dominated the British film industry, but he had little sense of how to articulate his ideas or put them into practice. His sole attempt to explain his choice of story is notable for the emphasis that he places on economic and administrative criteria."

Ted Willis wrote "His caution with money became a legend in the business. Described as a man with short arms and long pockets who put more thought into signing a cheque than reading a script, he husbanded the film companies’ money and his own as if it were water in the desert."

Michael Denison, who was under contract to Associated British, called Clark "an enigmatic Scotsman of considerable wealth and power. His wealth was not, I am sure, derived from British films, but from some less hazardous source. Films were important to him nevertheless, for he had immortal longings in him; though sadly, from my point of view, these seemed too often to be snuffed out by the inhibiting hand of caution."

== Personal life ==
Clark was married to a woman called Mary. They had a son, Colin.

== Select films under Clark's regime ==
- The Hasty Heart (1949)
- Happy Go Lovely (1950)
- No Place for Jennifer (1950)
- Last Holiday (1950)
- Portrait of Clare (1950)
- The Franchise Affair (1950)
- Angels One Five (1951)
- Young Wives' Tale (1951)
- The Woman's Angle (1952)
- The Yellow Balloon (1952)
- Father's Doing Fine (1952)
- Knave of Hearts (1954)
- The Weak and the Wicked (1954)
- It's Great to be Young (1956)
- Yield to the Night (1956)
- Chase a Crooked Shadow (1958) - minority interest
- Ice Cold in Alex (1958)
