= Sportsmanship =

Ethos of fairness and enjoyment in sports

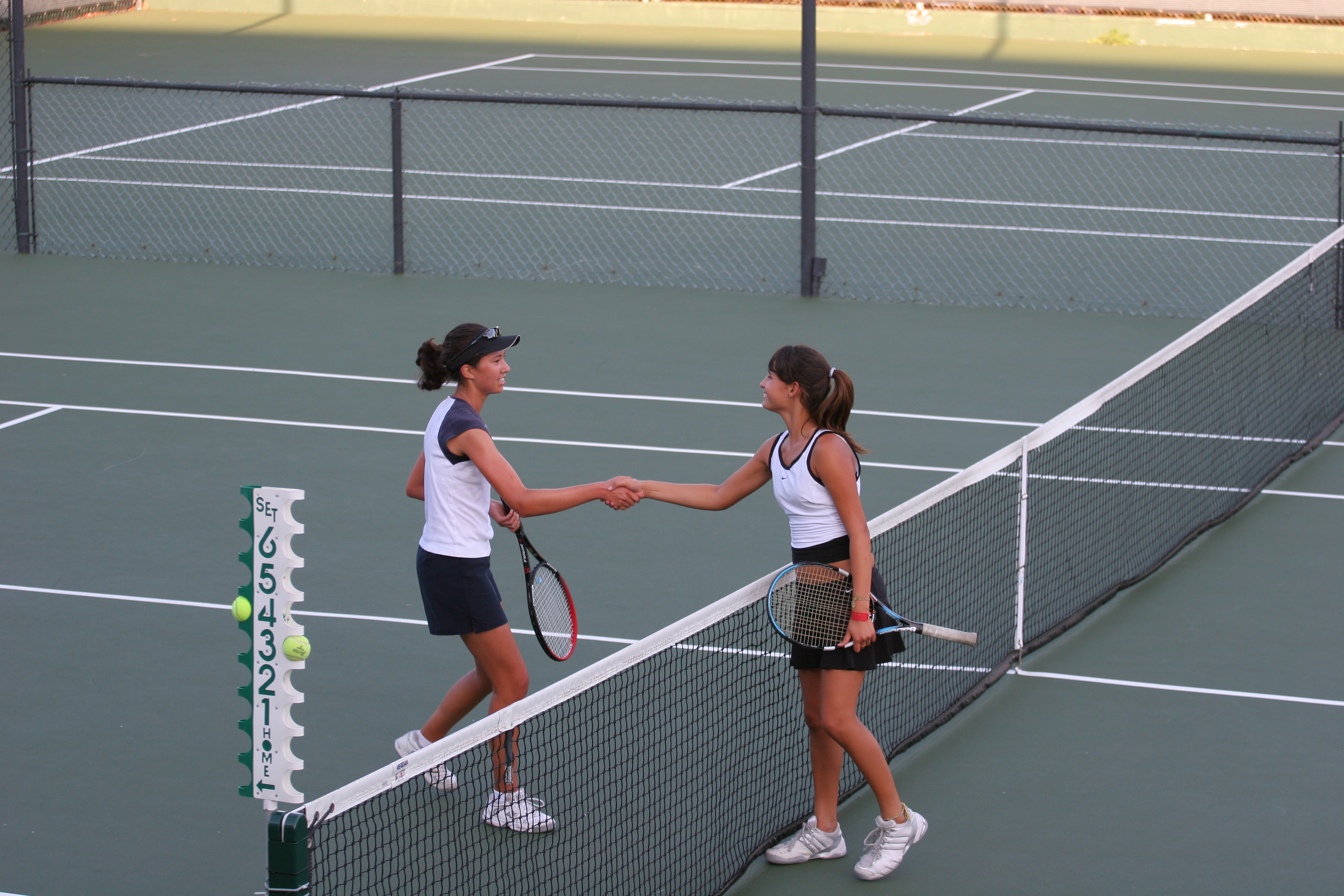
Shaking hands after a tennis match is considered a symbol of good sportsmanship.

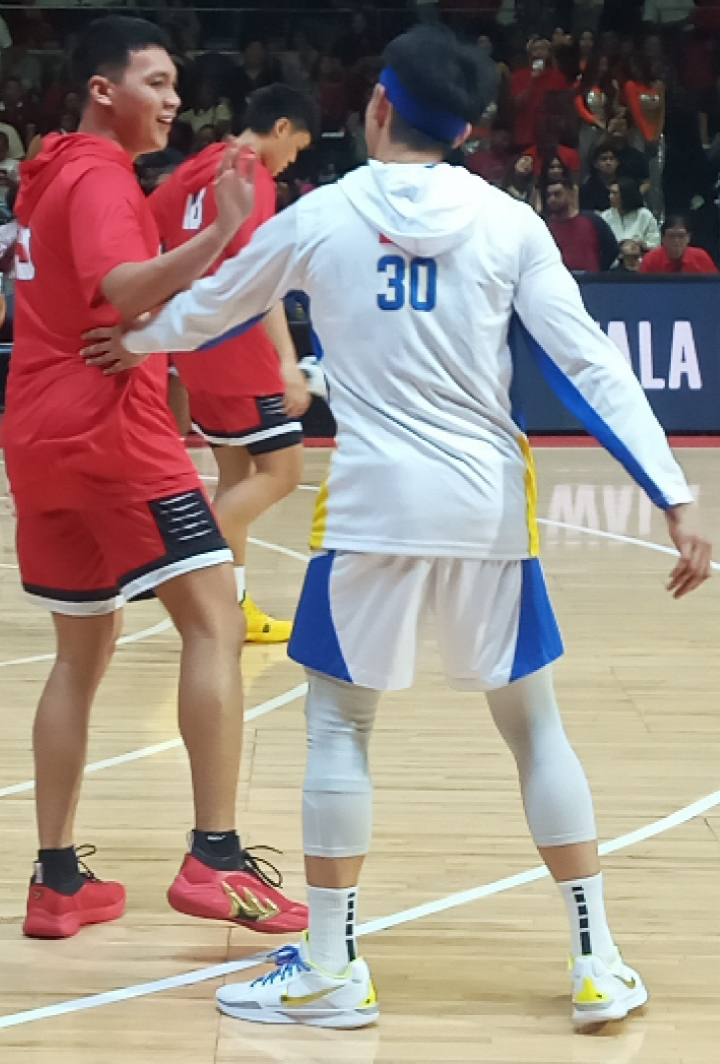
Patting on the back sometimes occurs before the game like this one from the Philippine Basketball Association.

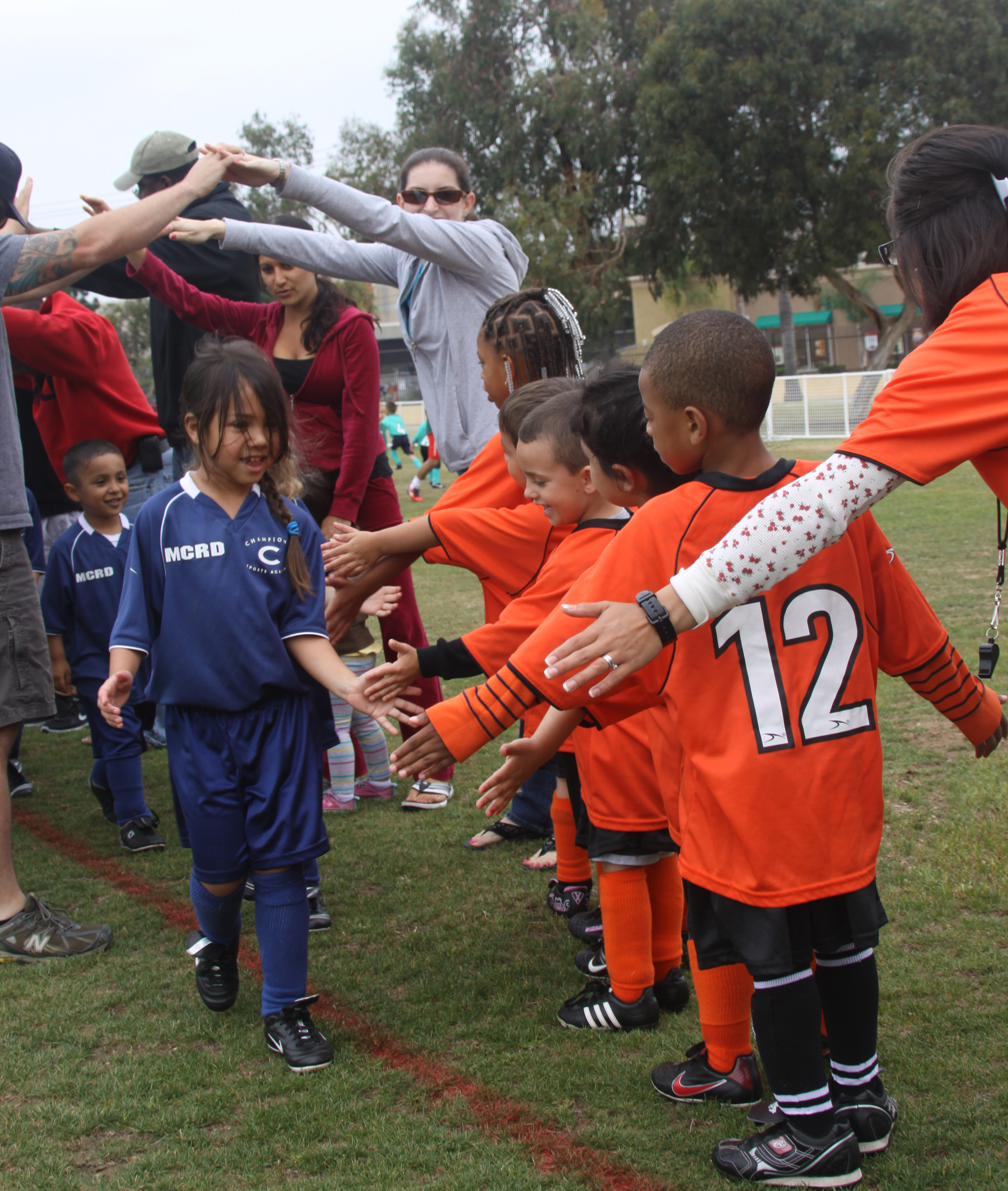
These two teams of young football (soccer) players line up and high-five after a game to practice good sportsmanship.

Sportsmanship is an ethos that a sport or activity should be enjoyed for its own sake, with proper consideration for fairness, ethics, respect, and a sense of fellowship with competitors.

A "sore loser" refers to one who takes defeat poorly, whereas a "good sport" means being a "good winner" as well as being a "good loser".

== Analysis ==
Sportsmanship can be conceptualized as an enduring and relatively stable characteristic or disposition such that individuals differ in the way they are generally expected to behave in sports situations. Sportsmanship mainly refers to virtues such as fairness, self-control, courage, and persistence, and has been associated with interpersonal concepts of treating others and being treated fairly, maintaining self-control if dealing with others, and respect for both authority and opponents. Sportsmanship is also looked at as being the way one reacts to a sport/game/player.

Four elements of sportsmanship are good form, the will to win, equity, and fairness. All four elements are critical and a balance must be found among all four for true sportsmanship to be illustrated. These elements may also cause conflict, as a person may desire to win more than to play in equity and fairness and thus resulting in a clash within the aspects of sportsmanship. This will cause problems as the person believes they are being a good sport, but they are imbalanced. When athletes become too self-centred, the idea of sportsmanship is dismissed.

Today's sporting culture, in particular elite sport, places great importance on the idea of competition and winning and sportsmanship may take a back seat as a result. In most, if not all sports, players at the elite level set the standards on sportsmanship and whether they like it or not, they are seen as leaders and role models in society.

Since every sport is rule-driven, the most common offence of bad sportsmanship is the act of cheating or breaking the rules to gain an unfair advantage; this is called unsportsmanlike conduct. A competitor who exhibits poor sportsmanship after losing a game or contest is often called a "sore loser", while a competitor who exhibits poor sportsmanship after winning is typically called a "bad winner". Sore loser behavior includes blaming others for the loss, not accepting responsibility for personal actions that contributed to the defeat, reacting to the loss in an immature or improper fashion, making excuses for the defeat, and citing unfavorable conditions or other petty issues as reasons for the defeat. A bad winner acts in a shallow fashion after their victory, such as by gloating about their win, rubbing the win in the face(s) of the opponent(s), and lowering the opponent(s)'s self-esteem by constantly reminding the opponent(s) of their poor performance in comparison (even if the opponent(s) competed well). Not showing respect to the other team is considered as being a bad sportsman and could lead to demoralising effects; as Leslie Howe describes: "If a pitcher in baseball decides to pitch not to his maximum ability suggest that the batter is not at an adequate level, [it] could lead to the batter to have low self-confidence or worth."

Six categories relating to sportsmanship are the elements of sports, the elements of sportsmanship, clarifications, conflicts, balance, and irreducibility. All six of these characterize a person with good sportsmanship. Even though there is some affinity between some of the categories, they are distinct elements.

"In essence, play has for its directed and immediate end joy, pleasure, and delights and which is dominated by a spirit of moderation and generosity. Athletics, on the other hand, is essentially a competitive activity, which has for its end victory in the contest and which is characterized of dedication, sacrifice and intensity." Hence, the virtues of a player are radically different from the virtues of an athlete. Rudd and Stoll provide an example from 1995, when a U.S. high school athletic league banned the post-game handshake that was a part of sports such as football and basketball. The handshaking was banned because of fights that were ensuing after the handshake. Most players are influenced by the leaders around them such as coaches and older players, "if there are coaches and administrators who don't understand sportsmanship, then what about the players?"

== Examples ==
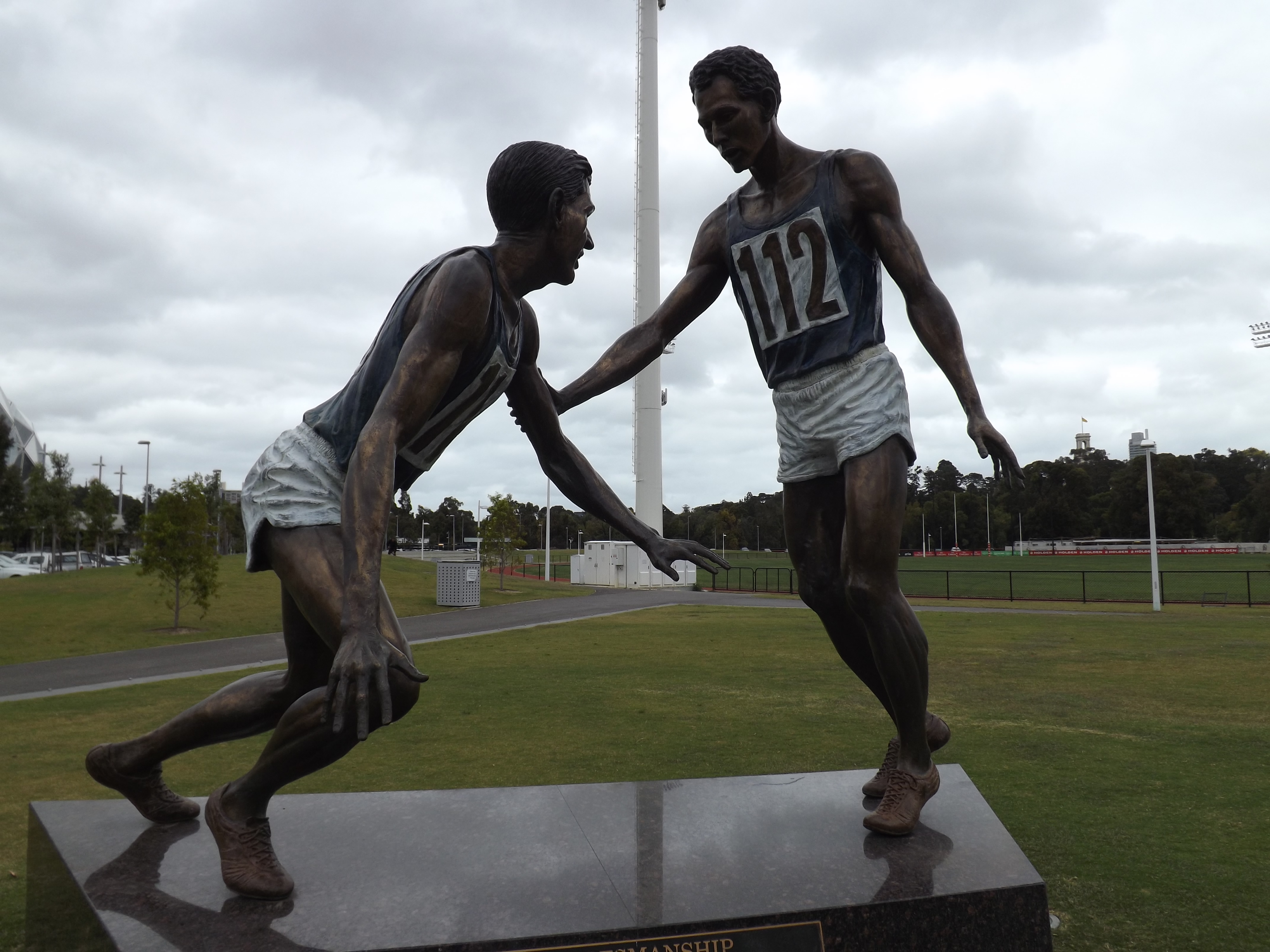
A moment of sportsmanship when John Landy helped Ron Clarke get up after he had fallen.

There are various ways that sportsmanship is practiced in different sports. Being a good sport often includes treating others as you would also like to be treated, cheering for good plays (even if they are made by the opposition), accepting responsibility for your mistakes, and keeping your perspective. An example of treating others how you would like to be treated would include being respectful and polite to other team members and the opposition because in return you would also like to be treated the same way.

Some popular examples of good sportsmanship include shaking hands, helping an opponent who may have fallen over, encouraging everyone, cheering, clapping or giving high-fives, and being respectful to everyone including teammates, the opposition, parents, and officials. Most importantly it is often encouraged and said regarding sportsmanship that "It's not whether you win or lose, it's how you play the game."

Sportsmanship can be manifested in different ways depending on the game itself or the culture of the group. For example, in the sport of cricket, a player will sometimes acknowledge that he is out by walking off the field, even though the umpires (game officials) had thought that he was not out. In another example, a tennis player who sees a ball go in but is called out by the linesperson could concede the point or suggest the opponent make a challenge, as was the case with professional tennis player Jack Sock on at least two occasions.

== Contributing factors ==
Sportsmanship can be affected by contributing factors such as the players' values and attitudes towards the sport and also on professional role models. Role models in sport are expected to act in a moral and respectful way. When elite sporting role models do not encourage sportsmanship this can encourage other people to act in similar ways to the athletes that they look up to and idolize. For example, if an individual looked up to an athlete who was drinking excessively, they may see this as acceptable behavior. The direct correlation between sportsmanship and leadership is also considered to be another contributing factor. Having a positive environment in your sporting team will therefore create good sportsmanship from the individuals. Having a positive leadership by the captains, coaches, and supporters would then encourage a positive sporting environment.

== See also ==
- Lady Byng Memorial, trophy given by the National Hockey League to the player who shows the best sportsmanship
- Cricket: Spirit of the Game
- Pierre de Coubertin World Fair Play Trophy, a special medal handed out for extraordinary acts of sportsmanship, even to one's own detriment
- Fair Play Award (disambiguation)
- Fair Play Trophy (disambiguation)
- Gamesmanship
- Football War
- Ultimate (sport)
- Unsportsmanlike conduct
- Unwritten rules of baseball
