= Don't Bother to Knock (1961 film) =

1961 British film by Cyril Frankel

- Theatrical release poster
- Directed by: Cyril Frankel
- Screenplay by: Denis Cannan; Frederic Gotfurt
- Based on: Love From Everybody by Clifford Hanley
- Produced by: Frank Godwin
- Starring: Richard Todd; Nicole Maurey; Elke Sommer; June Thorburn; Rik Battaglia; Judith Anderson
- Cinematography: Geoffrey Unsworth
- Edited by: Anne V. Coates
- Music by: Elisabeth Lutyens
- Production companies: Associated British; Haileywood Productions
- Distributed by: Warner-Pathé Distributors
- Release dates: 18 May 1961 (Sheffield); 1 June 1961 (London)
- Running time: 89 minutes
- Country: United Kingdom
- Language: English

Don't Bother to Knock (U.S. title: Why Bother to Knock) is a 1961 British comedy film directed by Cyril Frankel starring Richard Todd, Nicole Maurey, Elke Sommer, June Thorburn, Rik Battaglia and Judith Anderson. The screenplay was by Denis Cannan and Frederic Gotfurt, based on the 1959 novel Love From Everybody (also published as Don't Bother to Knock) by Clifford Hanley.

== Premise ==
Bill Ferguson, a travel agent in Edinburgh, has an argument with his girlfriend Stella after he loses the key to his apartment. Unnoticed by Bill, Maggie, an American business associate of his, finds his key in his trouser cuff where he had dropped it, but, before returning it, she makes a copy of the key and gives Bill a gift of a case containing several copies of the key with his address on an attached metal tag.

Subsequently travelling around Europe on a business trip, Bill has romantic encounters with three women, giving each one a standing invitation to visit him when in Edinburgh plus one of the keys to his flat. When two of them, plus the daughter of the other, arrive at about the same time to attend the Edinburgh Festival, they all decide to stay with Bill, and Bill has to cope with the women all meeting each other, as well as Stella finding out about them.

== Cast ==
- Richard Todd as Bill Ferguson
- Nicole Maurey as Lucille Daumier
- Elke Sommer as Ingrid Lyne
- June Thorburn as Stella Napier
- Rik Battaglia as Giulio
- Judith Anderson as Maggie Shoemaker
- Dawn Beret as Harry
- Scott Finch as Perry
- Eleanor Summerfield as Harry's mother
- John Le Mesurier as Harry's father
- Colin Gordon as Joe Rolsom
- Kenneth Fortescue as Ian
- Ronald Fraser as Fred
- Tommy Duggan as Al Coburn
- Michael Shepley as Colonel
- Joan Sterndale-Bennett as spinster
- Amanda Barrie as American girl
- Warren Mitchell as waiter (uncredited)

== Production ==
The film was based on a book called Love from Everybody which Richard Todd thought was funny; he arranged for it to be optioned by his own company, Haileywood Films. Associated British agreed to finance and the NFFC provided 40% of the budget. He wrote "From the very beginning Don’t Bother to Knock was an enjoyable picture to make, partly because of its amusing story line, partly because we were a very happy company, and not least because we were always surrounded by a carefully selected bevy of beautiful woman."

== Critical reception ==
Todd said the film "was hammered by the press" and was not a commercial success, in part because it was released in summer when the weather was very good.

The Monthly Film Bulletin wrote: "Despite an elegant wardrobe, pretty faces, and the contemporary trappings of an unusually chic and sunny Edinburgh, this isn't even one of sophisticated comedy's poor relations. The basic joke of having all a man's affairs catch up on him at once might have made a snappy one-set stage farce. But here the humour is wan, the continuity fragmentary, and the characterisation without interest. Richard Todd, whose own production this is, seems a shade too mature and world-weary for the slick roué he plays, so that at moments he becomes an unintended figure of pathos in his compulsive philanderings."

The Radio Times Guide to Films gave the film 2/5 stars, writing: "This is a leaden romp that starts out smug and ends up tasteless. Richard Todd looks uncomfortable as the philandering travel agent who discovers, to girlfriend June Thorburn's horror, that all his European flirtations have arrived at his Edinburgh home at once. Thanks to Geoffrey Unsworth and Anne V. Coates respectively, it has better photography and editing than it deserves."

Variety wrote: "Richard Todd, who has scored many successes in fairly serious screen roles, has now branched out into production on his own account, and not unnaturally starring himself in his first effort. He has chosen a light, flippant comedy. It would be over-loyal to rate it as more than a qualified success. The film is amiable, harmless, but lacking in witty bite, with situations mostly predictable."
