= Victor Skutezky =

Austrian film producer and author (1893–1981)

- Born: 15 January 1893; Brünn, Austro-Hungarian Empire
- Died: 1981 (aged 87–88); London, United Kingdom
- Other name: Viktor Skutezky
- Occupations: Producer, screenwriter
- Years active: 1929–1958 (film)

Victor Skutezky (15 January 1893 – 1981) was an Austrian-born British film producer, screenwriter and production manager. He was born in Moravia when it was part of the Austro-Hungarian Empire, but moved to Berlin after the First World War. He was employed in the German film industry during the Weimar Republic, but fled following the Nazi takeover due to his Jewish background. He settled in Britain as a refugee. He was a key filmmaker at Associated British Picture Corporation where he was a staff producer then had his own production company, Marble Arch Films.

== Selected filmography ==
- The Call of the North (1929)
- Sinful and Sweet (1929)
- The Man Without Love (1929)
- Daughter of the Regiment (1929)
- The Schlemihl (1931)
- It Happened One Sunday (1944) – screenplay
- Quiet Weekend (1946) – screenplay, producer
- Temptation Harbour (1947) – producer
- Landfall (1949) – producer
- For Them That Trespass (1949) – producer
- Murder without Crime (1951) – producer
- Young Wives' Tale (1951) – producer
- Father's Doing Fine (1952) – producer
- The Yellow Balloon (1953) – producer
- The Weak and the Wicked (1954) – producer
- It's Great to be Young! (1956) – producer
- Alive and Kicking (1958) – producer

== Bibliography ==
- Prawer, S.S. Between Two Worlds: The Jewish Presence in German and Austrian Film, 1910-1933. Berghahn Books, 2005.
