= Gamesman =

Gamesman may refer to:

- Gamesman, a person who is into gamesmanship
- Gamesman (DC Comics), a supervillain from DC Comics
