= Young Wives' Tale (play) =

1949 play

- Original language: English
- Written by: Ronald Jeans
- Genre: Comedy
- Setting: St John's Wood, London

Premiere
- Date: 9 May 1949
- Place: Theatre Royal, Brighton

Young Wives' Tale is a 1949 comedy play by the British writer Ronald Jeans. It premiered at the Theatre Royal, Brighton before transferring to the Savoy Theatre in London's West End where it ran for 373 performances between 7 July 1949 and 27 May 1950. The original London cast included Naunton Wayne, Joan Greenwood, Derek Farr, Joan Haythorne and Margaret Scudamore.

== Adaptation ==
In 1951 it was made into a British film of the same title directed by Henry Cass, with Greenwood and Farr reprising their stage roles alongside Nigel Patrick, Athene Seyler and Audrey Hepburn.

== Bibliography ==
- Goble, Alan. The Complete Index to Literary Sources in Film. Walter de Gruyter, 1999.
- Wearing, J.P. The London Stage 1940-1949: A Calendar of Productions, Performers, and Personnel. Rowman & Littlefield, 2014.
