= School for Scoundrels (2006 film) =

2006 comedy film directed by Todd Phillips

- Theatrical release poster
- Directed by: Todd Phillips
- Written by: Todd Phillips; Scot Armstrong
- Based on: School for Scoundrels by Hal E. Chester (uncredited) & Patricia Moyes (uncredited)
- Produced by: Daniel Goldberg; Geyer Kosinski; Todd Phillips
- Starring: Billy Bob Thornton; Jon Heder; Jacinda Barrett; Luis Guzmán; David Cross; Horatio Sanz; Sarah Silverman; Michael Clarke Duncan
- Cinematography: Jonathan Brown
- Edited by: Leslie Jones; Dan Schalk
- Music by: Christophe Beck
- Production companies: Dimension Films; Media Talent Group; Picked Last
- Distributed by: The Weinstein Company; Metro-Goldwyn-Mayer; Dimension Films
- Release date: September 29, 2006
- Running time: 100 minutes
- Country: United States
- Language: English
- Budget: $35 million
- Box office: $23.9 million

School for Scoundrels is a 2006 American comedy film, starring Billy Bob Thornton and Jon Heder, and directed by Todd Phillips. The film is based on the 1960 British film School for Scoundrels. The remake was released on September 29, 2006, receiving mostly negative reviews and was a box office disappointment, by grossing $23.9 million against a $35 million budget.

The remake has a similar theme to the original film, but a noticeably different plot and tone.

== Plot ==
Roger is a downtrodden meter reader, subject to ridicule from co-workers and regular denizens. He dreams of dating Amanda, a foreign graduate student from Australia who lives in his building. To overcome his lack of self-esteem, his friend Ian, who runs a community center, encourages Roger to sign up for a course taught by Dr. P where Roger and his classmates are constantly bullied and ridiculed by Dr. P and his assistant Lesher, who likes to use outrageous and unethical methods on them, including humiliation. Some tasks they are required to do are quite cruel and primitive as they are given pagers – like the task to start a conflict or even a fight with somebody they meet just to prove they are fearless, with some winding up on the losing end, including Roger, who started a conflict with his co-worker, Zack, who gave him a swirly over the last danish. However, nobody intends to quit the course because Dr. P says he won't give a refund of $5,000 to anyone who quits or disobeys the orders given to them. During a paintball fight in the woods, Roger became triumphant in the game as he shot Lesher with his own paintball gun, saving Walsh, Diego, and Eli from a potentially sick fate. With newfound confidence, Roger managed to reclaim his sneakers that were stolen from thugs who feuded with him over a parking ticket. After Roger bragged about becoming the top student, Ian warned Roger that Dr. P will destroy him if his progress is too fast, just like he has done to one of his former students.

While participating, Roger begins to develop a sense of personal pride and finally asks Amanda for a date where he uses tricks he learned during the course. Wanting to prove that he's still got his edge, Dr. P starts competing with Roger for Amanda. He approaches her with a false story that he is a successful and child-loving surgeon whose wife has died, and Amanda, who is a voluntary caretaker for animals, is immediately attracted and starts dating him. When Roger begins to see what's happening, he decides to take action to get Amanda back, although his actions are futile. After a competitive tennis match in which Roger attacks him in a fit of jealousy, Dr. P enlists the talents of Roger's classmates, Ernie and Little Pete, to break into Amanda's apartment, paint graffiti on the walls, steal her panties, and paint the dog (the last one didn't sit well with Dr. P), so he could frame Roger as a stalker. Ernie and Pete were then dressed like cops to "arrest" Roger and escort him out. Roger later used his authority as a meter reader to impound Dr. P's car, and in retaliation Dr. P gets Roger fired from his job.

Roger heads to Peekskill and learns of Dr. P's plans for Amanda, from Lonnie, a depressed former student, whose girlfriend was also led astray when he was humiliated by Dr. P. Lonnie shows Roger a fascicle full of evidence that Dr. P is a fraud, who uses multiple identities and false stories to attract or distract his victims. After learning that Dr. P invited Amanda to Miami, Roger is determined to stop him once for all. Roger recruits Walsh, Diego, and Eli in this endeavor, as well as Lonnie, who later changed courses after kidnapping Lesher. He heads for the airport to confront Dr. P, who tells him he is a winner and grants him two tickets – one for him and one for Amanda. However, Roger at first doesn't know that Dr. P has sent him to the wrong gate. After realizing he was again bamboozled by Dr. P, Roger heads to the right gate and boards the plane to Miami in the last moment. Roger finally exposes Dr. P's duplicity, it's revealed that Dr. P isn't a doctor or surgeon (he wanted to use a defibrillator on Roger who faked a panic attack) and that his wife is still alive. Amanda, disgusted by this revelation, finally realizes she was wrong and returns to Roger. When meeting Roger after some time, Dr. P grants him a diploma for passing his course – the first diploma ever issued by him. He also invites Roger to attend one of his future courses as a guest, but Roger turns him down.

In the epilogue, Walsh finally moves out of his parents house and lives with his grandmother. Diego finally leaves his wife and is dating Amanda's roommate, Becky. Eli is now married to a woman who thinks he's Moby. Roger and Amanda got married and went on vacation. Lonnie later takes Lesher to the woodlands Upstate in a test for survival; they are never seen again.

== Cast ==
- Billy Bob Thornton as Dr. P / Dennis Sherman, a competitive and no-nonsense self-esteem teacher
- Jon Heder as Roger Waddell, a low self-esteem meter reader who takes Dr. P's class
- Michael Clarke Duncan as Lesher, Dr. P's enforcer
- Jacinda Barrett as Amanda, an Australian grad student Roger is looking to win over
- Sarah Silverman as Becky, Amanda's narcissistic roommate
- Ben Stiller as Lonnie, a former student of Dr. P's who seeks payback against him and Lesher
- David Cross as Ian, a former student of Dr. P's and the owner of a community center
- Matt Walsh as Walsh, a student still living with his parents
- Horatio Sanz as Diego, a student looking to end things with his abusive wife
- Todd Louiso as Eli, a student of Dr. P's
- Jon Glaser as Ernie, a taxi driver and student of Dr. P's
- Paul Scheer as Little Pete, a nurse and student of Dr. P's
- Dan Fogler as Zack, Roger's co-worker and known bully
- Luis Guzmán as Sergeant Moorehead, Roger's supervisor
- DeRay Davis as Bee Bee, a gangbanger who stole Roger's shoes
- Joanne Baron as Lois
- Andrew Daly as classmate
- Jim Parsons as classmate
- Aziz Ansari as classmate
- Joe Nunez as classmate

== Similarities between original and remake ==
The character of Dr. P is a homage to the headmaster of the fictional Yeovil College of Lifemanship, Stephen Potter, in the original 1960 film. The Gamesmanship books, actual works on which both films are based, were written by the real author named Stephen Potter.

Both films feature a tennis game between love rivals as a set-piece.

== Reception ==
School for Scoundrels came in at #4 at the North American box office in its opening weekend, accumulating $8,602,333, before eventually grossing $23,947,685 worldwide.

The film received mainly negative reviews, with Rotten Tomatoes giving the film 26% and a consensus that "School for Scoundrels squanders its talented cast with a formulaic, unfocused attempt at a romantic comedy that's neither romantic nor funny."
