= Sands of the Desert =

1960 British film by John Paddy Carstairs

- Original UK quad poster
- Directed by: John Paddy Carstairs
- Written by: John Paddy Carstairs (screenplay); Charlie Drake (additional dialogue)
- Story by: Anne Burnaby; Stafford Byrne; Robert Hall
- Produced by: Gordon Scott
- Starring: Charlie Drake
- Cinematography: Gilbert Taylor
- Edited by: Richard Best
- Music by: Stanley Black
- Production company: Associated British Picture Corporation
- Distributed by: Warner-Pathé Distributors (UK)
- Release date: 8 September 1960 (UK)
- Running time: 92 minutes
- Country: United Kingdom
- Language: English

Sands of the Desert is a 1960 British adventure comedy film directed and written by John Paddy Carstairs and starring Charlie Drake (his first lead role in a feature film), Peter Arne, Sarah Branch and Raymond Huntley.

== Plot ==
Charlie Sands, a British travel agent, is sent to run a holiday camp in the Arabian Peninsula after his predecessor is assassinated because the property is sitting on a potential oilfield.

== Cast ==
- Charlie Drake as Charlie Sands
- Peter Arne as Sheikh El Jabez
- Sarah Branch as Janet Brown
- Raymond Huntley as Bossom
- Rebecca Dignam as Nerima
- Peter Illing as Sheikh Ibrahim
- Harold Kasket as Abdullah
- Marne Maitland as advisor to sheikh
- Neil McCarthy as Hassan
- Derek Sydney as Mamud
- Alan Tilvern as Mustafa
- Martin Benson as Selin
- Eric Pohlmann as Scrobin
- Inia Te Wiata as Fahid
- Paul Stassino as pilot
- Beth Rogan as air hostess

== Box office ==
Kine Weekly called it a "money maker" at the British box office in 1960.

== Critical reception ==
The Monthly Film Bulletin wrote: "Charlie Drake's original comedy talent, as exploited by his television shows, here vanishes beneath a heavy, studio-bound hash-up of slapstick and obvious jokes about sheikhs, harems and mirages. Unconvincing model work, a sentimental sub-plot and the wooden playing of the heroine are further insurmountable difficulties besetting the comedian's attempts to lighten the mixture by his impish mannerisms of gait and speech."

Leslie Halliwell wrote "Limp star comedy with poor studio work and meandering script."

In The Radio Times Guide to Films David Parkinson gave the film 1/5 stars, writing: "Poor old Charlie Drake. To call his flirtation with film fame and unmitigated disaster, would be understating the extent which he failed to translate his stage, radio and TV success to the big screen. Director John Paddy Carstairs also who wrote this silly story in which travel agent Drakes sets out to uncover the saboteur at a holiday camp. Better than his other efforts, but that's not saying much."

Variety wrote: "Color and lensing is good, but the editing, as so often in this sort of film where one situation rarely leads to another, is often erratic. "Desert" will do okay with undiscriminating audiences, but Drake might have been well advised to have thinned down on his role until he has gained greater big screen experience."

TV Guide described it as "a mildly amusing comedy that never really delivers its laugh quota, due primarily to its uneven script. Drake, a popular British television comic of the day, is good, though the movies are clearly not his metier."
