= Gordon Heath =

American actor and musician (1918–1991)

- Born: September 20, 1918; New York City, U.S.
- Died: August 27, 1991 (aged 72); Paris, France
- Occupations: Actor, musician, café owner
- Years active: 1937–1989
- Partner: Lee Payant (1949-76; Payant's death)

Gordon Heath (September 20, 1918 – August 27, 1991) was an American actor and musician who narrated the animated feature film Animal Farm (1954) and appeared in the title role of The Emperor Jones (1953) and Othello (1955), both live BBC telecasts, respectively directed by Alvin Rakoff and Tony Richardson. It featured several kisses between himself and Rosemary Harris and is a contender for the first interracial kiss on television.

== Biography ==
Heath was born in New York City, his parents' only child. His father Cyril Gordon Heath had emigrated from Barbados to the US, where he met and married Hattie Hooper. Gordon Heath showed an early talent for both music and art, but opted to pursue an acting career, working on stage and radio. Joining the New York radio station WMCA in 1945 he became the first black staff announcer employed by a major US radio station. In 1945 he appeared on Broadway to great success in the play Deep Are the Roots, written by Arnaud d'Usseau and James Gow, directed by Elia Kazan, and starring Barbara Bel Geddes. The play ran for 447 performances, and when it was subsequently produced in London's West End, Heath reprised his co-starring role in it. After the six-month London run, Heath decided to settle in Paris, France, in 1948.

He also acted in Paris, and in 1950 in London he played Othello on stage and later for BBC Television. He directed an English-speaking production company, the Studio Theater of Paris, for 10 years from the 1960s. This company was responsible for gathering many of the regular English dubbing actors in the city, including Heath, Ginger Hall, Frederick Neumann, Barbara Sommers, Yves Brainville and Heath's music and life partner Lee Payant.

He and Payant operated a Left Bank café in Paris called L'Abbaye, whose clientele included Josephine Baker, Yves Montand, Eartha Kitt, Rita Hayworth and other celebrities of the era, and where they were the entertainers. Many of the duo's folk albums from the 1950s were recorded there and released on various international labels, including Elektra Records. Payant died on December 14, 1976.

Heath died in Paris after a lengthy illness on August 27, 1991.

== Filmography ==
Year	Title	Role	Notes
1953	The Emperor Jones	Emperor Brutus Jones	TV movie
1950-1954	BBC Sunday-Night Theatre	Rev. Ezekiel Selby / Stanley Atlas / Brett Charles	3 episodes
1954	Animal Farm	Narrator	Voice
1955	Captain Gallant of the Foreign Legion	Charlie	Episode: "The Prayer Rug"
1955	Mr. Arkadin	Pianist	Uncredited
1955	The Heroes Are Tired	Sidney	
1955	Othello	Othello	TV movie
1956	Le secret de soeur Angèle	Le trompettiste	
1956	Man of Africa	Narrator	Voice
1958	Storm Over Jamaica	Coroner	
1959	Sapphire	Paul Slade	
1961	My Baby is Black!	Daniel	
1962	My Uncle from Texas		
1966	Lost Command	Dia	
1969	Staircase	Postman	
1969	The Madwoman of Chaillot	The Folksinger	
1970	Aladdin and His Magic Lamp	Magician of Egypt	English version, Voice
1972	La nuit Bulgare		
1972	L'aventure, c'est l'aventure	Le général africain	
1983	L'africain	Le ministre	
1985	Asterix Versus Caesar	Caesar	English version, Voice
1986	Asterix in Britain	Caesar	English version, Voice
1989	Samuel Fuller's Street of No Return	Black Bum	(final film role)

== Select discography ==
- Gordon Heath and Lee Payant Sing Songs of the Abbaye ‒ Elektra (1954)
- Chants Tradionnels des Etats-Unis – Editions de la Boite à Musique LD 313 (1955)
- Gordon Heath and Lee Payant Sing Encores from the Abbaye ‒ Elektra (1955)
- Folksongs and Footnotes – Abbaye Record 1 (1956)
- An Evening at L'Abbaye – Elektra (1957)
- Abbaye Anniversary Album – Abbaye Record 2 (1959)
- Gordon Heath Sings Spirituals – Abbaye Record 3 (1961)

== Bibliography ==
- Bourne, Stephen. "Heath, Gordon." Who's Who in Contemporary Gay & Lesbian History from World War II to the Present Day. Robert Aldrich and Garry Wotherspoon, eds. London and New York: Routledge, 2001. 183.
- Breman, Paul. "Obituary: Gordon Heath." The Independent (London) (September 13, 1991): 26.
- Heath, Gordon. Deep Are the Roots: Memoirs of a Black Expatriate. Amherst: The University of Massachusetts Press, 1992.
- Shipman, David. "Obituary: Gordon Heath." The Independent (London) (September 2, 1991): 21.
