= My Baby Is Black! =

1961 film by Claude Bernard-Aubert

My Baby Is Black! (Original French title: Les lâches vivent d'espoir, "Cowards Live on Hope") is a 1961 French romantic drama film retitled for exploitation release in the U.S. in 1965. The film was written and directed by Claude Bernard-Aubert and starred Françoise Giret, Gordon Heath and Aram Stephan, with music by Michel Magne. It was intended to examine society's view on race in the early 1960s.

== Overview ==
In Paris, a white college student named Françoise gives birth to a black child. The events leading to the baby's birth are revealed, including the mother's courtship by a black medical student named Daniel and the horrors of bigotry that she faces as her family and peers turn their backs on her. In addition to the strong focus on the social taboo of interracial romance and sex, the film shows Daniel's experiences as a victim of racism in their neighborhood.

Originally a romantic drama with sociological undertones, the film was released in the United States as an exploitation film. It was advertised for its shock value and shown in drive-in theaters but was not particularly successful, as the product bore little relation to the exploitative picture promised by its advertising campaign.

== Cast ==
- Gordon Heath as Daniel
- Françoise Giret as Françoise
- Aram Stephan as The Professor
- Mag-Avril as The Concierge
- Claude Berri as The Painter
- Hervé Watine as The Guitarist
- Fred Carault as Françoise's Father
- Viviane Méry as Françoise's Mother

== Critical reception ==
Allmovie called the film "More thoughtful and less exploitive than its American release title would lead one to expect."
