= An Evening at L'Abbaye =

Live album by Gordon Heath Lee Payant
- Released: 1957
- Label: Elektra

Alternative Cover

An Evening at L'Abbaye is an album of duets by Gordon Heath and Lee Payant released by Elektra Records in 1957. L'Abbaye was a popular Left Bank nightclub in Paris, opened in 1949 by Heath and Payant and where the two performed folk songs, spirituals, and blues in English and French for 27 years until Payant died from cancer in 1976.
