= No Time for Tears (film) =

1957 British film by Directed by Cyril Frankel

- British theatrical poster
- Directed by: Cyril Frankel
- Written by: Anne Burnaby; Frederic Gotfurt
- Based on: an original story by Anne Burnaby
- Produced by: W.A. Whittaker
- Starring: Anna Neagle; George Baker; Sylvia Syms; Anthony Quayle
- Cinematography: Gilbert Taylor
- Edited by: Gordon Pilkington
- Music by: Francis Chagrin
- Production company: Associated British Picture Corporation
- Distributed by: Associated British-Pathé (UK)
- Release dates: 8 August 1957 (London, England)
- Running time: 86 minutes
- Country: United Kingdom
- Language: English

No Time for Tears is a 1957 British drama film directed by Cyril Frankel in CinemaScope and Eastman Color and starring Anna Neagle, George Baker, Sylvia Syms and Anthony Quayle. It was written by Anne Burnaby and Frederix Gotfurt. The staff at a children's hospital struggle with their workload.

== Plot ==
The interwoven dramas of staff and patients in Mayfield Children's Hospital, where the doctors and nurses are in the business of restoring children's lives. One small child risks losing his sight, while twin boys fool the doctors over which one has appendicitis. Meanwhile, behind the scenes, new nurse Margaret Collier suffers pangs of unrequited love for houseman Dr. Nigel Barnes.

== Cast ==
- Anna Neagle as Matron Eleanor Hammond
- George Baker as Doctor Nigel Barnes
- Sylvia Syms as Nurse Margaret Collier
- Anthony Quayle as Doctor Graham Seagrave
- Flora Robson as Sister Birch
- Alan White as Doctor Hugh Storey
- Daphne Anderson as Doctor Marian Cornish
- Sophie Stewart as Sister Willis
- Patricia Marmont as Sister Davies
- Rosalie Crutchley as Theatre Sister
- Victor Brooks as Mr. Harris
- Angela Baddeley as Mrs. Harris
- Jessica Cairns as Lawrie
- Carla Challoner as Jenny
- Cyril Chamberlain as Hall Porter
- Christopher Frost as Peter
- Joan Hickson as Sister Duckworth
- Michael Hordern as the surgeon
- Viola Keats as Mrs. McKenna
- Linda Leo as sick child
- Jonathan Ley as Timmy Gardener
- Lucille Mapp as Maya
- Richard O'Sullivan as William Reynolds
- Gillian Owen as Night Nurse
- Loretta Parry as Jackie
- Adrienne Posta as Cathy Harris
- Christopher Witty as George Harris
- Marjorie Rhodes as Ethel
- George Rose as Dobbie
- Joan Sims as Sister O'Malley
- Hermione Harvey as hospital receptionist

== Production ==
Herbert Wilcox tried to get the rights to the story but they were obtained by Associated British. That company offered a lead role to Wilcox's wife Anna Neagle. It was the first film she appeared in that was not directed by Wilcox for twenty years.

== Reception ==
=== Box office ===
According to Kinematograph Weekly the film was "in the money" at the British box office in 1957.

=== Critical reception ===
Monthly Film Bulletin said "No Time for Tears neglects none of the characteristic incidents of the hospital picture: the doctor-nurse affair, the touch-and-go operation, a miraculous recovery, supervision by an all-seeing matron, and medical-student humour are all exploited. But the perfunctory way in which the film assembles its material, its shameless reliance on easy emotionalism and disjointed narrative style, make this little more than a hospital soap opera. It is by no means incompetently made, and within its cosy conventions adequately played; its picture of hospital life, though, conveys a sense less of devotion and dedication than of sickly sweetness."

The Observer called it "sentimental but not often silly ... its overall tone is kind, the atmosphere cheerful."

The Evening Sentinel said "there's just about every clinical cliche on the chart."

Variety called it "a routine comedy-weepie".

Sky Movies gave the film two out of five stars, and wrote, "this is standard medical soap fare and could be mistaken for a bumper edition of Casualty": while TV Guide rated the film three out of four stars, and wrote, "Though the situations are clearly out of the movie medical bag, the ensemble manages to rise above clichés and stereotypes. Neagle carries the film as the head nurse, with good support from Syms as the new nurse on her staff".

Filmink said it "needed less subplots and more soap, but it’s not bad and Syms’ character sings and dances in a random dance number at the end."

Leslie Halliwell said: "Totally predicatable British tearjerker with a happy ending."

In British Sound Films: The Studio Years 1928–1959 David Quinlan rated the film as "good", writing: "Hospital soap opera largely steers clear of stickiness into warmth."

The Radio Times Guide to Films gave the film 2/5 stars, writing: "What else could you call a film whose sole intention is to have you blubbing your eyes out from the off? Anna Neagle stars in this mawkish account of life in a children's hospital. If the triumphs and tragedies of the kiddies don't have you reaching for tissues, then the torrid love life of nurse Sylvia Syms certainly will. The members of the cast work minor miracles despite the string of clichés."
