= The Schlemihl =

1931 film

- Directed by: Max Nosseck
- Written by: Hans Rameau
- Produced by: Victor Skutezky
- Starring: Curt Bois; La Jana; Hans Adalbert Schlettow
- Cinematography: Willy Winterstein
- Edited by: Rudi Fehr
- Music by: Mischa Spoliansky
- Production company: Mikrophon Film
- Distributed by: Mikrophon Verleih
- Release date: 25 November 1931
- Running time: 75 minutes
- Country: Germany
- Language: German

The Schlemihl (German: Der Schlemihl) is a 1931 German comedy film directed by Max Nosseck and starring Curt Bois, La Jana and Hans Adalbert Schlettow. It was shot at the Halensee Studios in Berlin. The film's sets were designed by the art director Heinrich Richter. The title refers to the Yiddish word Schlemiel, to describe a foolish or unlucky person. It was produced during the later years of the Weimar Republic. A number of figures involved with the film were of Jewish background and were forced out of the German film industry following the Nazi takeover.

== Synopsis ==
Having recently been fired from his job, the perpetually unfortunate Hartwig for once has a stroke of luck when he is mistaken for an aristocrat by a wealthy man and attracts the attention of his dream woman the dancer Garda Maro. He then tries to display his bravery to Garda by foiling a robbery and end up in a high-speed chase across the city.

== Cast ==
- Curt Bois as Hartwig
- La Jana as Garda Maro, Tänzerin
- Hans Adalbert Schlettow as Jack Brillant
- Molino von Kluck as Sweetheart
- Hubert von Meyerinck as Baron Stechling
- Gregori Chmara as Fürst Janitscheff
- Max Ehrlich as Geheimrat Prof. Dr. Fürchterlich
- Georg Berg as Blümchen, Möbelhändler
- Robert Weinmann as Der Ober

== Bibliography ==
- Flaig, Paul. Weimar Slapstick and Hollywood Comedy Transformed. Bloomsbury Academic, 2025.
- Klaus, Ulrich J. Deutsche Tonfilme: Jahrgang 1932. Klaus-Archiv, 1988.
- Waldman, Harry. Nazi Films in America, 1933-1942. McFarland, 2008.
