= The Adventures of Robinson Crusoe (TV series) =

- Directed by: Jean Sacha
- Starring: Robert Hoffmann
- Narrated by: Lee Payant
- Theme music composer: Robert Mellin, Gian Piero Reverberi
- Country of origin: France
- No. of episodes: 13

Production
- Executive producer: Claire Monis
- Running time: 25 min

Original release
- Release: 12 October 1965 – 4 January 1966

The Adventures of Robinson Crusoe (French: Les Aventures de Robinson Crusoë) is a French-German children's television drama series made by Franco London Films (a.k.a. FLF Television Paris) and based on Daniel Defoe's 1719 novel Robinson Crusoe. The show was first aired in Germany in October 1964 under the title Robinson Crusoe as four 90-minute episodes by co-producers ZDF television, and syndicated in the USA the same year. It was first aired in the UK in 1965 as a 13-part serial. This English dubbed version produced by Henry Deutschmeister also had a new musical soundtrack composed by Robert Mellin and Gian Piero Reverberi instead of the music composed by Georges Van Parys for the French/German original. The production concentrated not only on events on the island but included Crusoe's other adventures, told in flashback.

The English-language version's theme music, which the BBC requested before they would buy the serial, has been praised. Radio commentator Glenn Mitchell said "The theme tune, with its rumbling introductory notes suggesting the rolling waves of the on-screen title sequence remains distinctive, as does the full incidental score, comprising numerous cues that in each case represent some part of Crusoe's existence. The score combines the maritime idiom of the late 17th and early 18th centuries with some very 1960s influences - (later, composer Gian Piero Reverberi's Rondò Veneziano re-imagined Vivaldi for the 20th century, a recognisably similar project.)" The theme has been covered by musicians such as The Art of Noise on their album Below The Waste.

== Description ==
After its debut in 1965 it became a staple part of the BBC's school summer holiday schedules. Often shown Mondays to Fridays in the mid-1970s, it was last screened in the early 1980s, after which the BBC's contract for repeat screenings expired. It is the story of a young Englishman's struggle for survival on an unknown desert island, and his recollections of his adventures prior to the shipwreck that brought him there, in particular his involvement with slave traders. He has his pet dog Dick, a parrot and a goat for company. In the latter half of the story a group of cannibals arrive on his island; he repels them by means of explosives, and in the process rescues a man from becoming their next meal; he names him Friday. In the end he comes to terms with his less-than-exemplary past, and becomes a better man thanks to his experiences on the island, befriending Friday and putting his life in order.

The serial was filmed on Gran Canaria, the 3rd largest of the Canary Islands, off the coast of Morocco. Robinson's Island locations were shot at Playa del Ingles on the southern tip of Gran Canaria; the Moroccan scenes were filmed further along the coast at Playa de Maspalomas and the Dunes of Maspalomas; the small village of Tejeda located inland at the notional centre of Gran Canaria was used as the location for Robinson's Plantation in Brazil. Most of this footage was shot mute because of the lack of dialogue and the time it saved on location, the sound being dubbed on later. The English locations (York/Hull) were shot in Normandy, France. The filming took four months to complete. For the Gran Canaria footage a small 11 man film crew was used, all of whom also played small parts in the serial, such as assistant director Luc Andrieux who took the part of Kasir the fishmonger. This was Austrian, Salzburg-born, actor Robert Hoffmann's first professional acting job after leaving the French actors school in Paris in 1964. (In Defoe's novel Crusoe is only 27, and his father a German émigré from Bremen, surnamed Kreutznaer, so that Crusoe is an anglicization of this name.)

Franco London Film made three different cuts of the show available (four-part, six-part and thirteen-part versions) to accommodate the broadcasting requirements of countries buying the serial. The success of this production led to a series of 16 French/German co-production adaptations of classic adventure and children's novels between 1964 and 1983, for ZDF and ORTF in France. These serials are known by German fans as the ZDF four parters. The man behind these mini epics was German producer/writer Walter Ulbrich. Franco London Film, in association with Deropa Films (Germany), were involved in the next four serials: Don Quixote the Man of La Mancha, produced by Walter Ulbrich and Henry Deutschmeister in 1965 (the last to be made in monochrome); Die Schatzinsel/L'ile au Tresor in 1966, an adaptation of Treasure Island that starred English actor Ivor Dean as Long John Silver; Les Aventures de Tom Sawyer in 1968 (broadcast in 13 parts on BBC1 from 1970 to 1974); and finally Die Lederstrumpf Erzahlungen an adaptation of James Fenimore Cooper's novels featuring Natty Bumppo, collectively known as The Leatherstocking Tales, (including The Last of the Mohicans) in 1969.

The serial has been dubbed into German, English, French and Italian.

== Cast ==
- Robert Hoffmann as Robinson Crusoe
- Lee Payant as Voice of Robinson Crusoe (English dub)
- Renzo Palmer as Voice of Robinson Crusoe (Italian dub)
- Fabian Cevallos as Friday
- Jacques Berthier as Robinson's father
- Phillipe Ogouz as Rodney
- Jacques Gougin as Robinson's friends in York
- Francis Chares as Robinson's friends in York
- Phillipe Bruneau as Robinson's friends in York
- Guy Mairesse as Captain of the Guard
- Alain Nobis as J.B.Wooseley, the lawyer (part 2)
- Robert Dalban as Captain Darrick (parts 4/5)
- Jacques Dynam as Bush, second mate on Darrick's ship (part 5)
- Peter Miles as Sailor on Darrick's ship (part 5)
- Jean Paul Bernard as Aga Asan, the Emir (part 5)
- Jaqueline Chotard as the Emir's woman (part 5)
- Luc Andrieux as Kasir, the fishmonger (part 6)
- Roland Rodier as Portuguese captain (part 7)
- Robert Luchaire as Aitkins, leader of the mutineers/pirates (parts 12/13)
- Gilbert Robin as Captain (part 13)

Additional Cast of German Cut:

- Erich Bludau as Robinson's father
- Jane Marken as Jenny, the Crusoe's housekeeper
- Oskar von Schab as Jeremias B. Wooseley, the lawyer
- Claudia Berg as Wooseley's niece
- Paul Chevalier as Blind man
- Michael Chevalier as Voice of Robinson Crusoe

Certain scenes were shot with different actors for the German cut of Robinson Crusoe, and some extra scenes were filmed. For example; Wooseley's niece, the blind man and Jenny do not appear in the French/English version. Other scenes were edited from the German version, for example the looks of distaste upon Hoffmann's face in the first episode as he rolls a shipwrecked body in the sea, and tries to eat an insect. Stills from the German scenes can be seen in the photo gallery on the Network DVD of the series.

Apart from Payant as Robinson Crusoe, the voice artists used for the English dub for other characters, such as Robinson's father or Captain Darrick etc. are uncredited.

Renzo Palmer was the Italian voice of Robinson Crusoe. The Italian dub also used the Robert Mellin / P. Reverberi musical score. It was first transmitted in Italy by RAI in the Winter 1964–1965 (from 13 December 1964), and the last Italian repeat was in the summer of 1978.

== Episode list – 13 part English dub ==
- Part 1 (12 October 1965)

While travelling on a ship from Brazil to Africa, a violent storm casts Robinson onto a deserted island off the coast of South America. He spends his solitude in remembering his youthful escapades in York.

- Part 2 (19 October 1965)

Alone on his island, Robinson solves the problem of food and meets his first companion.

- Part 3 (26 October 1965)

Robinson recalls leaving home and travelling to Hull to seek a ship. The remains of the Esmeralda are washed near the shore, and he busies himself salvaging as much as possible before it sinks.

- Part 4 (2 November 1965)

Robinson recalls his first sea voyages and finds a cave which becomes his new home.

- Part 5 (9 November 1965)

In the intervals of building a shelter and making furniture, Robinson recalls how he was assumed to be dead by his friends and was sold into slavery.

- Part 6 (16 November 1965)

A fire in his cave destroys all he has created. While rebuilding his home he recalls how he escaped from slavery and the events that led him to become owner of a Brazilian banana plantation.

- Part 7 (23 November 1965)

Robinson relates how he came to be involved in the wreck of the Esmerelda.

- Part 8 (30 November 1965)

Robinson discovers an abandoned ship and pirate's treasure hoard.

- Part 9 (7 December 1965)

Having drifted with the pirate ship Robinson lands on another part of the island.

- Part 10 (14 December 1965)

Robinson encounters the cannibals and rescues Friday.

- Part 11 (21 December 1965)

Robinson tries to teach Friday how to become civilised, but Friday runs away.

- Part 12 (28 December 1965)

Friday returns, and other unwelcome visitors arrive on the island.

- Part 13 (4 January 1966)

Friday and Robinson defeat the mutineers and escape from the island.

== Broadcasts ==
=== Germany ===
The first German broadcast took place from 3 October 1964 – 24 October 1964, at 8:00 pm on ZDF and repeated: (27 November 1966 – 18 December 1966), (16 April 1973 – 19 April 1973) and (9 September 1979 – 30 September 1979).

The East German channel DDR1 screened the 6 part version twice in 1973.

The last German broadcast was on Tele 5 (5 June 1992 – 8 June 1992).

German digital channel ZDF Neo repeated all four episodes in a marathon screening from 12:55 pm to 6:40 pm on Monday 5 April 2010, and again on Thursday 30 December 2010 from 3:00 pm to 8:15 pm.

=== France ===
The first French broadcast started on 10 September 1965 on ORTF.

=== UK ===
The first BBC repeats began at 5:20 pm from 13 February 1967, then, beginning between BBC coverage of the Apollo 11 Moon landing, 21 June – 15 September 1969 at 5:20 pm and in the Summer of 1972 at 9:30/9:55/10:00 am before coverage of the Olympics, and one last evening repeat (3 May 1973 – 26 July 1973) at 5:15 pm. The BBC also ran the serial on school summer holiday morning schedules during August 1975. The next run was on Saturdays (5 March 1977 – 28 May 1977) at 9:35 am. The last BBC repeats began on Saturday 3 April 1982 on BBC1 at 10:00 am (from part 3 the serial was incorporated into the programme Get Set for Summer hosted by Mark Curry and Peter Powell), concluding on Saturday 26 June 1982.

== Crew ==
- Director – Jean Sacha
- Assistant director – Luc Andrieux
- Director of photography – Quinto Albicocco
- Cameraman – Jean Malaussena
- Camera assistant – Oliver Benoist
- Art director – Robert Luchaire
- Film editors – Helene Plemiannikov and Borys Lewin
- Sound engineer – George Mardiguian
- Make-up – Roger Chanteau
- Adaptation – Jean Paul Carriere and Pierre Reynal
- Dialogue – Jacques Sommet
- Narration – Jean Marsan
- Script editor – Denise Gaillard
- Producer – Henry Deutschmeister
- Executive producer – Claire Monis
- Music composed by George Van Parys (original French/German version)
- Music composed by Robert Mellin and P.Reverberi (English version)
- The Franco London Orchestra conducted by P.Reverberi
- Production manager/script editor – Walter Ulbrich (under the pseudonym Eugen von Metz) (German version)
- German dub by Berliner Synchron GmbH-Wenzel Ludecke
- Italian print co-production credit: F.L.F. – Ultra Film

Jean-Paul Carriere is the credit on the English/French film prints but other sources state his name as Jean-Claude Carrière.

== Audio ==
- In 1965, Petit Menestrel Records released in France a record of the music of George van Parys' original score (ALB 405).
- In February 1966, Philips Records released a seven-inch single of the theme tune by the Franco London Orchestra (BF 1470). There were two further re-releases in March 1967 (BF1562) and August 1969 (BF1806).
- In 1990, Silva Screen Records released on CD the music from the English dub of the series by Robert Mellin and P. Reverberi. The tracks were taken from tapes kept by Robert Mellin in Italy.
- In 1997, Silva Screen Records released an extended version, engineered by Mark Ayres, since more tapes had been found at Franco London Film in France. This version also featured Silva Screen's new recording of a suite of music from the series.
- In November 2011, Silva Screen Records released 300 copies a special limited edition seven-inch vinyl single of the theme tune. Side 1 contains the "Opening Title Theme" and "The Main Theme"; side 2 contains "Catching Dinner" and "Adrift" (SIL7 1376). Technically, this was an E.P. (Extended Player) which played at 33 rpm, not the standard seven-inch single speed of 45 rpm. Unlike the original 1966 release, which credits the recording to the Franco London Orchestra, this release credits the recording to the Robert Mellin Orchestra.

== VHS and DVD releases ==
- In 1997, the complete series was released on VHS video by Network in four volumes. This was thanks to the work of Tim Beddows who tracked down the only known English language prints in a French film vault. However, these were 16mm prints, since the original 35mm prints used by the BBC between 1965 and 1982 had been junked, and no other 35mm prints could be found.
- In 2006, the four-part German version was released on DVD, dubbed in German by Concorde Home Entertainment and restored from 35mm prints.
- In 2007, Network released the series on DVD. Once again these were the recovered 16mm prints; these also included a French print of part one with burnt in Portuguese subtitles and an interview with Robert Hoffman from TV show V.I.P. (1997).
