= Temptation Harbour =

1947 British film by Lance Comfort

- Temptation Harbour
- Directed by: Lance Comfort
- Written by: Rodney Ackland; Frederick Gotfurt
- Produced by: Victor Skutezky
- Starring: Robert Newton; Simone Simon; William Hartnell
- Cinematography: Otto Heller
- Edited by: Lito Carruthers
- Music by: Mischa Spoliansky
- Production company: Associated British Picture Corporation
- Distributed by: Pathe Pictures
- Release date: 27 February 1947 (UK)
- Running time: 102 minutes
- Country: United Kingdom
- Language: English
- Budget: $1 million or £133,174
- Box office: £132,235

Temptation Harbour is a 1947 British black and white crime/drama film, directed by Lance Comfort and starring Robert Newton, Simone Simon and William Hartnell. It was adapted by Rodney Ackland and Frederick Gotfurt from Newhaven-Dieppe (also known as L'Homme de Londres or Affairs of Destiny), the 1933 novella by Georges Simenon.

== Plot ==
A signalman on a quay sees a fight between two men. One of the men is deliberately pushed into the water and the signalman cannot save him, but he decides to keep his suitcase, which he later finds is full of banknotes with a value of £5000.

== Cast ==
- Robert Newton as Bert Mallinson
- Simone Simon as Camelia
- William Hartnell as Jim Brown
- Marcel Dalio as Inspector Dupré
- Margaret Barton as Betty Mallinson
- Edward Rigby as Tatem
- Joan Hopkins as Beryl Brown
- Kathleen Harrison as Mabel
- Leslie Dwyer as Reg
- Charles Victor as Gowshall
- Irene Handl as Mrs Gowshall
- Wylie Watson as Fred
- John Salew as CID Inspector
- George Woodbridge as Mr Frost
- Kathleen Boutall as Mrs Frost

== Production ==
Although based on Simenon's novella, the plot was restructured and the location was changed from France to England. It was made at Welwyn Studios, with sets designed by the art director Cedric Dawe

== Reception ==
=== Box office ===
The film was a commercial success. As of 1 April 1950 the film earned distributor's gross receipts of £106,226 in the UK of which £72,026 went to the producer. The film made a loss of £61,148.

=== Critical reception ===
The Monthly Film Bulletin wrote: "The acting in this film is good; Robert Newton as the signalman depicts all the temptations to which the flesh is heir; his moveable face shows the continual struggle between his conscience and his love for his daughter. Here is a weak man who is stupid as well as cunning. Margaret Barton as the daughter is exactly what an overworked child would be. Simone Simon as the "mermaid" is a clever actress, clever in more senses than one, and unpleasant. To people who know the "Newhaven-Dieppe" channel crossing there is a certain thrill in the Southern Railway scenes, the arrival of the ship, the cranes, the signal-box, the trains are all there beautifully and technically perfect. And the background music is good and descriptive."

In British Sound Films: The Studio Years 1928–1959 David Quinlan rated the film as "average", writing: "Leisurely but gripping drama with rather unpleasant characters."

== See also ==
- The Man from London (1943)
- The Man from London (2007)
