= C.J. Latta =

British film executive

Cleo Jesse Latta CBE (died 6 October 1974 in Stamford, Connecticut) was a British film executive best known for being managing director of Associated British Picture Corporation and Warner Bros. cinemas. He helped establish the Variety Club. He was awarded with a CBE in 1964.
