= Anne Burnaby =

British screenwriter and playwright (1922–1999)

Anne Burnaby Southwood (15 December 1922 – 1999) was a British screenwriter and playwright.

Burnaby was the daughter of actor Davy Burnaby. She was married to John Southwood, a film publicist, with whom she had two children, in addition to having a third child with another partner. In June 1960, she was sentenced to 12 months in prison for stabbing Colonel Walter John Sparrow on the streets in April 1960 in Worthing, Sussex. Colonel Sparrow, an insurance businessman, was married to Burnaby's cousin and alleged she became obsessed with him. He stated that she came to visit their home in 1958 and stayed for 18 months in the staff flat, attempting to break up his marriage. At the time of the attack, she had been separated from her husband and was just released from a nursing home. The prosecutor cited her emotional disturbance in accepting a plea not of attempted murder but a lesser charge of wounding Sparrow with intent to do grievous bodily harm.

== Select filmography ==
- Landfall (1949)
- Young Wives' Tale (1951)
- Father's Doing Fine (1952)
- The Yellow Balloon (1953)
- Young and Willing (1954)
- No Time for Tears (1957)
- Operation Bullshine (1959)
- Sands of the Desert (1960)
- Girl in a Birdcage (1962) (Armchair Theatre episode)
