= Lee Payant =

American actor (1924–1976)

- Born: Leroy Payant; 1924; Seattle, Washington, U.S.
- Died: December 14, 1976 (aged 51–52); Paris, France
- Occupations: Film actor, director
- Partner: Gordon Heath (1949-76; Payant's death)

Lee Payant (born 1924 in Seattle, Washington – died 14 December 1976 in Paris, France), was an actor and film director also known for voicing the title role of the 1960s TV serial The Adventures of Robinson Crusoe in English.

From 1949 until his death in 1976, he and his musical associate and lover (actor and theatrical director) Gordon Heath ran a cafe and nightclub named L'Abbaye on the Rive Gauche in Paris. Here they both regularly played American and French folk, gospel and blues songs – being the only performers at the Abbaye. L'Abbaye was the namesake of their duet albums titled Songs of The Abbaye (1954), Encores From The Abbaye (1955), and An Evening at L'Abbaye (1957) on the Elektra label. Payant died of cancer in Paris in 1976.

== Filmography ==
Year	Title	Role	Notes
1952	Emergency Landing	Fiorello, 2nd Lt.	
1964	The Adventures of Robinson Crusoe	Robinson "Robby" Crusoe	English Version, Voice
1967	Asterix the Gaul	Asterix and Marcus Sourpuss	English Version, Voice
1968	Asterix and Cleopatra	Asterix	English Version, Voice
