= Landfall (1949 film) =

- Directed by: Ken Annakin
- Screenplay by: Talbot Jennings
- Story by: Gilbert Gunn; Anne Burnaby
- Based on: Landfall: A Channel Story by Nevil Shute
- Produced by: Victor Skutezky
- Starring: Michael Denison; Patricia Plunkett; Kathleen Harrison; David Tomlinson; Joan Dowling
- Cinematography: Wilkie Cooper
- Edited by: Peter Graham Scott
- Music by: Philip Green
- Production company: Associated British Picture Corporation
- Distributed by: Associated British-Pathé
- Release date: 27 October 1949 (UK)
- Running time: 86 minutes
- Country: United Kingdom
- Language: English
- Box office: £141,127 (UK)

Landfall is a 1949 British war film directed by Ken Annakin and starring Michael Denison, Patricia Plunkett and Kathleen Harrison. The screenplay was by Talbot Jennings from an adaptation by Gilbert Gunn and Anne Burnaby of the 1940 novel Landfall: A Channel Story by Nevil Shute.

== Synopsis ==
Rick Chambers, a British Coastal Command pilot in World War II based near Portsmouth, sinks what he believes to be a German submarine, unaware that a British submarine is also in that part of the Channel. When it emerges that the British submarine has been lost with all hands, a Navy enquiry is held and the senior naval officer concludes that Rick mistakenly attacked a British submarine in a friendly-fire incident. While the enquiry finds that the captain of the submarine was principally at fault for poor navigation, Rick is officially criticised for having failed to properly visually identify his target. Although his commanding officer disagrees with the court's finding and encourages Rick to stay with the squadron, Rick requests another posting.

Rick's fiancée Mona Stevens, a barmaid, overhears information that might help uncover what really happened to the British submarine. She reports this information to the Navy, who re-open the investigation and find that a German submarine was also in the area and torpedoed the British submarine, taking up its location and running on the surface, until it was spotted and sunk by Rick.

In the interim, Rick's new posting is a dangerous flying duty, testing a new type of guided bomb. After his aircraft crashes and he is critically injured, he is met at the hospital by the naval captain who originally ruled against him, and he tells Rick that he has been exonerated in the re-opened enquiry.

== Cast ==
- Michael Denison as Rick Chambers
- Patricia Plunkett as Mona Stevens
- Kathleen Harrison as Mrs. Stevens
- Denis O'Dea as Captain Burnaby
- David Tomlinson as Binks
- Charles Victor as Mr. Stevens
- Joan Dowling as Miriam
- A. E. Matthews as Air Raid Warden
- Maurice Denham as Wing Commander Hewitt
- Margaretta Scott as Mrs. Burnaby
- Sebastian Shaw as Wing Commander Dickens
- Nora Swinburne as Mrs. Blackett
- Laurence Harvey as Petty Officer Hooper
- Paul Carpenter as Flying Officer Morgan
- Frederick Leister as Admiral Blackett
- Hubert Gregg as Lieutenant Commander Dale
- Walter Hudd as Professor Legge
- Margaret Barton as Rosemary Chambers
- Edith Sharpe as Mrs. Chambers
- Ivan Samson as Commander Rutherford

== Production ==
Landfall was one of two films Ken Annakin made on loan out from Gainsborough Pictures to Associated British, the other being Double Confession (1950). Annakin wrote "Neither had very good scripts, nor exciting casting... except for Peter Lorre" who was in Double Confession.

== Reception ==
The Monthly Film Bulletin wrote: "Competent but unexciting story of some 1940 adventures in Coastal Command: Air Force (synthetic jollity) and Naval (strong, silent service) backgrounds interspersed with heavily humorous excerpts from the familiar home life of Kathleen Harrison."

Variety wrote: "It is nothing more than a soap opera replete with cliché and contrived incidents. It unsuccessfully mixes war heroics and romance, with a slight comment on the breakdown of England's social caste system."

The Radio Times gave the film two out of five stars, calling it a "dainty item from a vanished era of British war movies."

TV Guide rated the film similarly, concluding that "[a]dequate performances are marred by a script burdened with some soap opera dramatics."
