= School for Scoundrels (1960 film) =

1960 British film by Robert Hamer

- Original UK poster
- Directed by: Robert Hamer; Cyril Frankel (uncredited); Hal E. Chester (uncredited)
- Screenplay by: Patricia Moyes; Hal E. Chester; Peter Ustinov (uncredited); Frank Tarloff (uncredited)
- Based on: the Gamesmanship series by Stephen Potter
- Produced by: Hal E. Chester
- Starring: Ian Carmichael; Terry-Thomas; Janette Scott; Alastair Sim
- Cinematography: Erwin Hillier
- Edited by: Richard Best
- Music by: John Addison
- Production companies: Associated British Picture Corporation (ABPC); Guardsman Films
- Distributed by: Warner-Pathé Distributors (UK)
- Release date: 24 March 1960 (UK)
- Running time: 97 minutes
- Country: United Kingdom
- Language: English

School for Scoundrels (also known as School for Scoundrels Or How to Win without Actually Cheating) is a 1960 British comedy film directed by Robert Hamer (and, uncredited, Cyril Frankel and Hal E. Chester) and starring Ian Carmichael, Terry-Thomas, Janette Scott and Alastair Sim. It was inspired by the Gamesmanship series of books by Stephen Potter. The film has been remade twice: in Bollywood as Chhoti Si Baat (1975) and in Hollywood as School for Scoundrels (2006).

== Plot ==
Henry Palfrey, the head of a family firm in London, travels to Yeovil to enroll in the College of Lifemanship. Following his arrival, he meets with the principal, Mr. S. Potter, who believes in the science of "being one up on your opponents at all times". Potter deduces that Palfrey joined the college because of a woman when delving into his background, and asks him for his story concerning events prior to their enrollment. Palfrey confesses to being a loser, having no control over his firm - his senior clerk, Gloatbridge, not only commands more respect from his employees than he does, he also handles all the firm's business decisions. Life seemed to change for Palfrey when one day he encountered April Smith, an attractive woman who he fell in love with.

However, a casual acquaintance of Palfrey's, Raymond Delauney, encountered them on their dinner date when a restaurant nearly denied them entry, whereupon he proceeded to seduce April. The following day, Palfrey attempted to secure a car of his own after admiring Delauney's sports car to try to impress April, but was conned into buying a ramshackle 1924 car by a pair of second-hand car dealers. The final humiliation for Palfrey came when Delauney suggested a "friendly" tennis match at their local club, which he won easily, leaving Palfrey to feel completely despondent with his life.

After hearing his story, Potter assigns Palfrey to attend a selection of courses, each of which teach several ploys to gain the upper hand in various situations in life. Palfrey proves an apt pupil, and learns his final exam involves a field test of the skills he has picked up. Returning to London and observed by Potter, Palfrey proceeds to con the car dealers into giving him an Austin-Healey sports car and 100 guineas (£105) for the car they sold, claiming it's a vintage model. Later, at his family firm, Palfrey puts Gloatbridge in his place by pretending to arrange a merger with a larger firm, and conning him into believing his bookkeeping has become sloppy; this also prompts the other workers to show Palfrey better respect in the process.

Finally, Palfrey challenges Delauney to a tennis rematch, using various ploys to frustrate and fluster him, causing him to lose the match and ruin his chances with April. As she leaves with Palfrey for a drink at his home, Delauney is puzzled when Potter passes by him, and soon learns he and Palfrey did something suspicious on the club grounds. At his apartment, Palfrey tries to use his new wooing tricks on April, but finds himself unable to take advantage of her. Before he can send her home, Delauney barges in, accompanied by Potter, and forces Palfrey to reveal the truth behind what he did. Although Potter advises he uses another ploy, Palfrey admits everything, leading April to embrace him upon realizing he genuinely loves her and was trying to avoid ruining this. Potter, disgusted by what his pupil is doing, breaks the "fourth wall" to apologise to the audience. As the end credits roll, Delauney travels to Yeovil, intent on enrolling in the College of Lifemanship.

== Cast ==
- Ian Carmichael as Henry Palfrey
- Terry-Thomas as Raymond Delauney
- Alastair Sim as Mr. S. Potter
- Janette Scott as April Smith
- Dennis Price as Dunstan Dorchester
- Peter Jones as Dudley Dorchester
- Edward Chapman as Gloatbridge
- John Le Mesurier as Head Waiter
- Irene Handl as Mrs. Stringer, Palfrey's landlady
- Kynaston Reeves as General, a member of the tennis club
- Hattie Jacques as Miss Grimmet, an instructor
- Hugh Paddick as Mr. Pickthorn, an instructor
- Barbara Roscoe as Barbara, an assistant instructor
- Gerald Campion as Proudfoot, a student
- Monte Landis as Fleetsnod, a student
- Jeremy Lloyd as Dingle, a student
- Charles Lamb as Carpenter, an employee at the tennis club
- Anita Sharp-Bolster as the Maid at the College of Lifemanship

== Production ==
Some interest in creating a screen version of Stephen Potter's successful Gamesmanship series of books was shown by Cary Grant and Carl Foreman, but this project stalled when it proved difficult to translate the dry humour of the books for an American audience.

The film's title is a reference to Richard Brinsley Sheridan's 1777 comic play, The School for Scandal. As Potter's books were not written in a narrative form, the device of Potter (Alastair Sim) having set up a "College of Lifemanship" in Yeovil to educate those seeking to apply his methods for success was invented for the film. Although the film only credits Patricia Moyes and producer Hal E. Chester for the screenplay, it was co-written by Peter Ustinov and Frank Tarloff. Dunstan and Dudley, the dishonest "Winsome Welshmen" car salesmen, were based on similar characters in a 1950s BBC radio comedy series, In All Directions, in which the leads were played by Ustinov and Jones; their catch phrase "Run for it!" was recycled in School for Scoundrels.

Director Robert Hamer was sacked during filming due to his drinking, and the film was completed by an uncredited Cyril Frankel and producer Chester. Hamer did not work in the film industry again, and died in 1963.

School for Scoundrels was made at Elstree Studios, and location scenes were mainly shot in the neighbouring vicinity. The location used as the tennis club was then a private members club, and is now a hotel. The hotel hosted a screening of the film in 2016 that was attended by Janette Scott, who answered questions about its filming.

In the film, Palfrey foolishly buys a "1924 4-litre Swiftmobile" from the crooked "Winsome Welshmen", and later succeeds in trading the car back to them for an ex-works Austin-Healey 100-six and 100 guineas (£105). The "Swiftmobile" was based upon a 1928 4½ litre Open four-seater Bentley, with a custom two-seat open body. The car, minus the body, was sold by the studio in 1961 for £50, and re-sold (with a new body) at an auction in 2003 for £110,000. The Austin-Healey 100-six used in the film was passed in at auction in the 1970s at around £30,000. The "Bellini 3.6" driven by Terry-Thomas was, in fact, a disguised Aston Martin DB3S.

== Release ==
After passing the British censors on 14 December 1959 School for Scoundrels premiered at the Warner Theatre in Leicester Square, London, on 24 March 1960. When the film was released in the United States on 11 July 1960, it was given the subtitle "or How to Win Without Actually Cheating", as reflected in the US poster by Tom Jung.

== Reception ==
Kine Weekly called the film a "money maker" at the British box office in 1960.

The Monthly Film Bulletin wrote: "The joke of Lifemanship, so elaborately worked up by Stephen Potter in his series of books, already looks a little fatigued, like the game of U and non-U. School for Scoundrels might have used it as a foundation for some edged social comedy; and occasionally it seems that this may be just around the corner. But the corner is never turned and the film keeps to a simpler formula: the before and after manner of the advertisements, with the one-down man rather monotonously demonstrating how Potterism has helped him to become one-up. In view of the limitations of the script, which makes nothing of the underlying savageries of the Lifemanship game of humiliation and inspired bad manners, Robert Hamer has directed with intelligent restraint. If the comedy lacks sharpness, he has not allowed it to become further blunted by bogus joviality."

While the review in The Times was very noncommittal, Leslie Halliwell described the film as "an amusing trifle, basically a series of sketches by familiar comic actors", and awarded it one star (out of a maximum of four and a minimum of zero).

Michael Brooke, reviewing for the British Film Institute's Screenoline website, criticised the film as having "little sign of the elegance and wit that characterised earlier Hamer films such as Kind Hearts and Coronets or The Spider and the Fly", but praised its script and performances, particularly those of Terry-Thomas and an "under-used" Sim.

In 2007, CNN listed the performance of Terry-Thomas among the top 10 British film villains, stating: "Thomas was the template for the lily-livered upper class bounder. Generally found twirling his cigarette holder while charming the ladies — at least, when not swindling, cheating or behaving like an absolute rotter..."
