= Landfall: A Channel Story =

1940 novel by Nevil Shute

First US edition (William Morrow)

Landfall: A Channel Story is a novel by Nevil Shute. It was first published in England in 1940 by Heinemann.

The story is set during the opening months of the Second World War and concerns a young pilot, Roderick 'Jerry' Chambers, who is part of an air-patrol unit guarding the southern coast of England – around Portsmouth. One day Chambers sees a submarine and, believing it to be German, attacks with his weaponry and bombs. The submarine is sunk.

Arriving back at base, he learns that indications are that the sunken submarine was a British submarine, not German as he had thought. Chambers escapes discipline but is censured and posted far away to the north of England.

Meanwhile, his love interest, Mona Stevens (a local barmaid), pieces together various eyewitness accounts that lead her to believe that the submarine that Chambers had sunk was, as he had thought, a German vessel – it having previously attacked and sunk the British sub that went missing that day.

Meanwhile Chambers is offered a chance to redeem himself in a dangerous mission to test a new marine attack system. His plane explodes in mid-air but he survives and assists the inventor in his work. Healing from the explosion, Chambers and Mona, now his wife, set off to a new life in Canada where he has been transferred to a posting as an instructor.

== Adaptations ==
The novel was adapted to film in 1949. Landfall starred Michael Denison and was directed by Ken Annakin.

== Notes ==
The novel was reviewed by George Orwell for New Statesman magazine on 7 December 1940.

The mistaken bombing of a British submarine by a British plane may be taken from a real incident. During the Second World War HMS Snapper was bombed by an unidentified plane off the Dutch coast, narrowly surviving. The same day a British pilot reported sinking a German U-boat in the same area. Confusion persists as to whether they were the same submarine and plane in both reports. John Anderson wrote in an April 2006 Nevil Shute Foundation newsletter, "The more I delve into this the more convinced I am that Shute got to hear about the Snapper incident and adapted it into the plot for Landfall."
