= Walter Ulbrich =

German film producer

- Born: 15 June 1910; Metz, Alsace–Lorraine, German Empire
- Died: 13 November 1991 (aged 81); Unterpfaffenhofen, Bavaria, Germany
- Occupations: Writer and producer
- Years active: 1938–1978

Walter Ulbrich (15 June 1910 – 13 November 1991) was a German film producer primarily known for writing and/or producing 10 of 16 four-part adventure mini-series made for West German TV in the 1960s and 1970s. Mostly based on classics of world literature such as Robinson Crusoe or The Sea Wolf, these West German/French co-productions traditionally premiered on West German public-service television in December and are therefore also known as Weihnachtsvierteiler (Christmas four-parters). The series have been dubbed into a variety of languages and also became popular outside Germany, especially in France, the UK, and Canada.

== His work and influence on European TV productions ==
As a writer, Ulbrich saw scriptwriting as an important process and tried to make sure his productions were true to the books, yet at the same time exciting. The latter sometimes necessitated including plots or characters from other novels or inventing them outright, which has garnered his adaptations some criticism. Because a script had to be arrived at that satisfied both German and French production partners, the scriptwriting stage could be lengthy, and so in the case of Two Years' Vacation it took four years from first draft to airing, because of script development as well as financial problems (on the French side).

Differences between e.g. the English, German, and French versions of a series often comprised more than just a different dub and titles: e.g. Two Years' Vacation has different scores (German score by Hans Posegga, French score by Alain Le Meur) and the German cut adds an extended introduction set in Peru that shows the—purely MacGuffin—gold treasure being stolen, but misses a few scenes at the end where the youths are reunited with their families. Also, the German version has narration by the character Dick Sand as an adult, which brings out some of the elements of the story which Ulbrich perceived as class warfare. The French cut lacks that added social comment. Generally, the German versions tend to focus more on action scenes (because they were also intended for prime-time adult audiences) and have more experimental/contemporary-sounding scores than their French counterparts.

On 27 April 1970 Ulbrich founded his own production company, Tele München Gruppe (TMG), which is still active today. In 1980, Concorde Filmverleih was founded as a distributor.

Ulbrich's productions were all done in cooperation with the ZDF public-service television channel and other international partners, especially from France and Romania. Their success prompted the other German public-service channel ARD to emulate the formula, leading to adventure series such as Huckleberry Finn and His Friends (1979/80) and Captain James Cook (1987). Ulbrich may not have invented international TV co-productions, but his series demonstrated the feasibility of high-quality TV productions using an eclectic mix of nationalities in front and behind the camera.

== Selected filmography ==
- 5 June (1942)
- Under the Bridges (1945)
- Where the Trains Go (1949)
- Seven Years in Tibet (1956)
- Rose Bernd (1957)
- As Long as the Heart Still Beats (1958)
- The Goose of Sedan (1959)

=== Four-parters with Ulbrich as writer and/or producer ===
#	Role^{[1]}	Title	Year	Film gauge	Director	Notes
1	W	The Adventures of Robinson Crusoe	1964	35 mm	Jean Sacha	Black-and-white
2	P	Don Quixote	1965	35 mm	Carlo Rim, Jacques Bourdon, Louis Grospierre	Starring Josef Meinrad as Don Quixote. Black-and-white
3	WP	Treasure Island	1966	35 mm	Wolfgang Liebeneiner, Jacques Bourdon	Filmed in color, but premiered on German TV in black-and-white
4	WP	Tom Sawyer and Huckleberry Finn	1968	35 mm	Wolfgang Liebeneiner
5	W	Leatherstocking Tales	1969	35 mm	Jean Dréville, Pierre Gaspard-Huit, Sergiu Nicolaescu
6	WP	The Sea Wolf	1971	35 mm	Wolfgang Staudte, Sergiu Nicolaescu	Starring Raimund Harmstorf as Wolf Larsen; Combination of The Sea Wolf, The Road, The Cruise of the Dazzler, and several other works by Jack London
7	W	Two Years' Vacation	1974	35 mm	Gilles Grangier, Sergiu Nicolaescu	Combination of three Jules Verne novels with added elements (such as the treasure hunt) by Ulbrich
8	WP	Burning Daylight	1975	16 mm	Wolfgang Staudte	Based on several works by Jack London about the Klondike gold rush
9	WP	Michel Strogoff	1976	16 mm	Jean-Pierre Decourt	Again starring Raimund Harmstorf
10	W	Kidnapped	1978	16 mm	Jean-Pierre Decourt	Starring David McCallum. Combination of the novels Kidnapped and Catriona. Also known for its Gaelic-inspired main title theme (David's Theme) by Vladimir Cosma which has been covered by folk music artists such as the Kelly family (1979) and Declan Galbraith (2006) as David’s Song (Who’ll Come With Me).
11	P	Mathias Sandorf	1979		Jean-Pierre Decourt
12	P	Caleb Williams	1980		Herbert Wise	Starring Mick Ford and Stephen Rea. Based on Things as They Are; or, The Adventures of Caleb Williams by William Godwin
13	P	La Nouvelle Malle des Indes	1981		Christian-Jaque	Biographical TV miniseries about Thomas Waghorn
14	P	Der Mann von Suez	1983		Christian-Jaque	Biographical TV miniseries about Ferdinand de Lesseps

W: as writer, P: as producer

Ulbrich also re-edited the French-produced Joseph Balsamo (1973, 16 mm, starring Jean Marais) for German TV, renaming it to Cagliostro, reducing its running time from 360 minutes to 255 minutes, and changing the plot substantially.

== See also ==
- The Adventures of Robinson Crusoe (TV series)
