= It's Great to Be Young (1956 film) =

British film by Cyril Frankel

- Directed by: Cyril Frankel
- Written by: Ted Willis (story and screenplay)
- Produced by: Victor Skutezky
- Starring: John Mills; Cecil Parker
- Cinematography: Gilbert Taylor
- Edited by: Max Benedict
- Music by: Louis Levy (musical director)
- Production company: Marble Arch Productions
- Distributed by: Associated British-Pathé (UK)
- Release date: 6 August 1956
- Running time: 94 minutes
- Country: United Kingdom
- Language: English
- Box office: £282,838

It's Great to Be Young is a 1956 British Technicolor musical comedy film directed by Cyril Frankel and starring Cecil Parker and John Mills. It was written by Ted Willis. The story concerns an inspirational school music teacher. Although the movie was very successful it has been described as "almost forgotten" today.

== Plot ==
Mr Dingle seeks to interest his pupils in music in order to enjoy life, while the new strict headmaster, Mr Frome, believes Dingle is ruining the children's traditional education.

Mr Dingle's pupils come up with a way to raise money by playing to crowds in the street and persuade him to help them. When this fails they decide to jazz it up and bring in some younger kids to help. This initiative is a success and, with the help of one of the pupil's parents, they are able to buy new musical instruments. The total cost, £200, is to be paid in instalments of £2.10s. per week which Dingle personally signs for.

However, when Mr Dingle ends up on the front page of the local newspaper, the headmaster locks the instruments up. The pupils manage to get them out of the locked cupboards, rehearse and put them back without anyone noticing.

Mr Dingle takes a second job playing the piano in his local pub for £4 a week plus free beer. However, he is spotted by one of the teachers who reports him to Mr Frome, who sacks him for it. The children protest about Dingle's dismissal by organising a strike and a sit-in. Children from other schools also stand outside in protest.

Eventually, order is restored as Mr Frome relents and allows Mr Dingle to return. The children carry both out triumphantly to the tune of Top of the Form.

== Cast ==
- John Mills as Mr. Dingle
- Cecil Parker as Frome
- John Salew as Routledge
- Elizabeth Kentish as Mrs. Castle
- Mona Washbourne as Miss Morrow
- Mary Merrall as Miss Wyvern
- Derek Blomfield as Paterson
- Jeremy Spenser as Nicky
- Dorothy Bromiley as Paulette
- Brian Smith as Ginger
- Wilfred Downing as Browning
- Robert Dickens as Morris
- Dawson France as Crowther
- Carole Shelley as Peggy
- Richard O'Sullivan as Lawson
- Norman Pierce as publican
- Eleanor Summerfield as barmaid
- Bryan Forbes as Mr. Parkes, organ salesman
- Marjorie Rhodes as landlady
- Eddie Byrne as Morris
- Russell Waters as Mr. Scott, School Inspector

== Soundtrack ==
The song "You are My First Love" is sung over the opening scenes of the film by Ruby Murray. Released on record, it reached number 16 in the UK.

== Reception ==
=== Box office ===
The film was one of the ten most popular films at the British box office in 1956. Ted Willis says that despite the film being a "smash hit" he never saw a percentage of the producers profits, which he was entitled to.

=== Critical reception ===
Monthly Film Bulletin said "A simple, boisterous schoolboy romp which echoes Hue and Cry [1947] and the early Garland-Rooney musicals without achieving the gaiety of the former or the slickness of the latter. A fairly conventional script is enlivened by John Mills' enjoyable performance and a few amusing moments. The dubbing of the musical numbers by professional groups is quite efficient, though the sugary, American-style songs strike an alien note in such emphatically British surroundings."

Kine Weekly said "Lively story, clever conbution by John Mills, talented juveniles, catchy theme song, rollicking highlights, picturesque backgrounds, star values, Technicolor and 'U' certificate."

BFI Screenonline writes, "It's Great To Be Young! has a fair claim to be not only one of Britain's first teenage musicals but also one of the most commercially successful of any musical made in Britain during the 1950s – it proved so popular that it allegedly caused riots in Singapore. Its virtues are those of many ABPC productions of its era, from the vibrant Eastmancolor cinematography to the immaculately-selected cast and even if some of the sixth-formers are aged in their twenties, they do sound convincing as teenagers."

The Radio Times Guide to Films gave the film 4/5 stars, writing: "This light-hearted comedy has a remarkable level of energy and a superb sense of pace. John Mills stars as trumpet-playing, jazz loving Mr Dingle, whose enforced resignation from Angel Hill School leads to a (very minor) revolution. The kids, led by Jeremy Spenser and Dorothy Bromiley, are charming, and, thanks to an excellent Ted Willis screenplay, the adults are utterly believable, as is the studio construction of the school."

Leslie Halliwell said: "Very acceptable but totally forgettable star comedy."

In British Sound Films: The Studio Years 1928–1959 David Quinlan rated the film as "very good", writing: "Tremendous comedy-with-music that only lets its swinging pace drop for a touch of sappy teenage romance. Bubbling, joyous stuff."
