= Man of Africa =

1953 film by Cyril Frankel

- Directed by: Cyril Frankel
- Written by: Cyril Frankel; Montagu Slater
- Produced by: John Grierson; Isobel Pargiter
- Starring: Frederick Bijuerenda
- Narrated by: Gordon Heath
- Cinematography: Denny Densham
- Edited by: Alvin Bailey
- Production company: Group 3 Films
- Release date: 1 September 1954
- Running time: 73 minutes
- Country: United Kingdom
- Language: English

Man of Africa (also known as The Kigezi Story) is a 1954 British documentary drama film directed by Cyril Frankel and starring Gordon Heath, Frederick Bijurenda and Violet Mukabureza. It was written by Frankel and Montagu Slater, and produced by John Grierson for Group 3 Films. It was entered into the 1954 Cannes Film Festival.

== Plot ==
In Uganda, a group of the Bakiga people, whose farming is failing due to soil erosion, travel to the unspoilt Kigezi area to build new farms. They encounter the pygmy people, traditionally despised by the Bakiga. The story tells of the Bakiga's hardships in starting new lives and finding peace with the pygmies.

== Cast ==
- Gordon Heath as narrator
- Frederick Bijurenda as Jonathan
- Violet Mukabureza as Violet
- Mattayo Bukwirwa as the soldier
- Butensa as himself
- Seperiera Mpambara as Sep
- Blaseo Mbalinda as Yokana
- Paulo Ngologosa as Jonathan's father
- Erisa Bashungula as the chief
- Jessica Mukawego as Jessica
- Bwenge as Yokana's father
- Rwanyarare as the blind man
- Filomena Sabajji as Filomena
- Eresi Rugasira as Eresi
- Asaza as Leah
- Nynamatonga as pygmy mother
- Kafuko as doctor
- Jane Mukankusi as Millie

== Production ==
The film was originally to be a documentary titled Soil Erosion commissioned in 1953 by the British government's Crown Film Unit. Frankel flew to Uganda to make the film, but before shooting could begin the Crown Film Unit was closed down. Producer John Grierson subsequently arranged for it to be made by Group 3 Films with the backing of the National Film Finance Corporation. On its completion, however, Group 3 rejected the film, and instead released a significantly edited version of it, cut from 6,660 ft to 3,960 ft. The film was not seen again until in 1984 Frankel obtained the original footage and augmented it with additional archive material. It was then shown at the British Film Institute's 1986 London Film Festival followed by a question-and-answer session with Frankel.

== Critical reception ==
Reviewing the original 1953 release,The Monthly Film Bulletin wrote: "This much-delayed Group 3 production has achieved commercial distribution in a severely truncated form. The version shown at the 1954 Edinburgh Festival was some thirty minutes longer, and this drastic re-editing has inevitably reduced the story to a confused muddle. Any assessment of the film's original intentions becomes somewhat difficult to arrive at, for one is left with a variably photographed African travelogue with social overtones, rather awkwardly acted and directed. Some attempt has been made to present an honest study of African problems as they affect the people themselves, although conventional characterisation and a forced melodramatic climax do little to clarify the issues. The natural dignity of the African players is a decided asset; the pigmies, in particular, are revealed as a cheerful and loyal people. The scenes of wild life are disappointingly brief."

Also reviewing the original, Kine Weekly wrote: "Set in Africa and portrayed by an all-native cast, it depicts the struggles of a forthright people to carve new lives for themselves in promising, though untamed territory. The acting is competent and the staging authentic but much meat has obviously been removed from the original script. ... The clash of personalites, to say nothing of the threat of malaria and the fear of wild life, ignites the drama, but drastic cutting prevents it from flaring into a thought-provoking let alone thrilling, white paper. Completely lacking in showmanship, it's more suitable for the classroom than the kinema."
