= The Emperor Jones (1953 TV play) =

1953 film by Alvin Rakoff

The Emperor Jones was a 1953 BBC Television production of the 1920 Eugene O'Neill play of the same title, and transmitted live on 7 July that year. It was adapted and directed by Alvin Rakoff (uncredited), starring Gordon Heath in the title role, with music by Billy Shalanki and choreography by Boscoe Holder. The production was not recorded, and is now lost. As summarised in The Radio Times, "The action of the play takes place on an island in the West Indies as yet not fully exploited by Western civilisation."

The BBC had previously broadcast an earlier production of O'Neil's play as two separate live and unrecorded performances on 11 and 13 May 1938, in which Robert Adams played Jones, and Frederick Burtwell the Trader.

== Cast ==
- Cecil Brock as The Prison Guard
- John Harrison as Len Griffin
- Gordon Heath as Brutus Jones
- Boscoe Holder as The Congo Witch-doctor
- Dan Jackson as Jeff
- Connie Smith as An Old Native Woman
- Harry Towb as The Auctioneer
- Neil Wilson as Henry Smithers
