= The Good Companions (1957 film) =

1956 British film by J. Lee Thompson

- Film poster
- Directed by: J. Lee Thompson
- Written by: J. L. Hodson; T. J. Morrison; J. B. Priestley
- Produced by: Hamilton G. Inglis; J. Lee Thompson
- Starring: Eric Portman
- Cinematography: Gilbert Taylor
- Edited by: Gordon Pilkington
- Music by: Laurie Johnson
- Release date: 9 January 1957
- Running time: 104 minutes
- Country: United Kingdom
- Language: English

The Good Companions is a 1957 British musical film directed by J. Lee Thompson and starring Eric Portman and Celia Johnson. It was written by J.L. Hodson, T.J. Morrison and J.B. Priestley based on the 1929 novel of the same name by Priestley and is a remake of the 1933 film version.

== Plot ==
The story of the “Dinky Doos”, a down-at-heel touring concert party, where the arrival of new members helps to improve the company's luck.

== Cast ==
- Eric Portman as Jess Oakroyd
- Celia Johnson as Miss Trant
- Hugh Griffith as Morton Mitcham
- Janette Scott as Susie Dean
- John Fraser as Inigo Jollifant
- Joyce Grenfell as Lady Parlitt
- Bobby Howes as Jimmy Nunn
- Rachel Roberts as Elsie and Effie Longstaff
- John Salew as Mr. Joe
- Mona Washbourne as Mrs. Joe
- Shirley Anne Field as redhead
- Carole Lesley as film star

== Production ==
It was one of the pet projects of Robert Clark, head of ABPC. J Lee Thompson was Clark's favourite director.

== Reception ==
=== Critical ===
The Monthly Film Bulletin wrote: "J. B. Priestiey's slightly dated original has been superficially modernised with a few "pop" songs (including a painful title number), intermittent attempts at an American musical style, and several references to television. The result is as incongruous as might be expected. Characterisation is consistently two dimensional, and the dialogue is dogged but flat. The director appears to have shot the majority of sequences from a limited number of angles and intercut the result. Though this technique succeeds in preventing visual monotony, it adds little except confusion to the narrative itself. The musical numbers, including the self-consciously lavish finale, are largely pseudo-Hollywood imitations."

Picture Show wrote: "Eric Portman (who was bom in Halifax) is brilliantly cast as Jess Oakroyd, the lovable Yorkshireman with 'shoulders as broad as his accent.' ... and Hugh Griffith gives an outstanding comic characterisation as Morton Mitcham, king of all theatrical boasters. The story provides wonderful song and dance routines."

In The Radio Times Guide to Films Adrian Turner gave the film 3/5 stars, writing: "J.B. Priestley's 1929 novel was first filmed in 1933 with John Gielgood and Jessie Matthews. This remake has a glittering array of female talent, although the men are less showy, but this still proves how British movies at the time could cast in depth without having to offer roles to the acting knights of the realm. The story, about a concert party, has dated, and it's all a bit too polite, but the cast makes it well worth watching."

Leslie Halliwell wrote "Faint hearted remake ... unwisely Cinemascoped and leaving no impression."

In British Sound Films: The Studio Years 1928–1959 David Quinlan rated the film as "good", writing: "Very decent remake of the Jessie Matthews classic, full of youthful zest."

=== Box office ===
The film was a box office disappointment. In a House of Lords debate it was revealed the film had lost £118,382.
