= Icing the kicker =

Timeout before a kick in gridiron football

In the sports of American football or Canadian football, the act of icing the kicker or freezing the kicker is the act of calling a timeout immediately prior to the snap before a field goal attempt in order to disrupt the process of kicking a field goal. The intent is to throw the kicker off their routine and force them to feel pressure for a longer amount of time. The tactic is used at the collegiate and professional levels, although its effectiveness has not been proven.

== Overview ==
In order to ice a kicker, either a player or a coach on the defending team will call a timeout just as the kicker is about to attempt field goal. This is intended to either stop the kick immediately as the kicker is mentally prepared, or allow for the kicker to kick immediately after the timeout so that the initial kick does not count, in an attempt to mentally disrupt the kicker for the actual kick. If the tactic is successful, the kicker will miss the kick due to choking. Should the kicker make the subsequent kick, then the attempt to ice the kicker is considered unsuccessful.

In the NFL, each team can only call one timeout between the same two plays, in other words, during the same dead-ball period. In contrast, repeated icing in college football is legal provided a team has multiple timeouts remaining.

One variant of this tactic, attributed to former Denver Broncos head coach Mike Shanahan, is to call time out from the sidelines just before the ball is snapped. This prevents the kicking team from realizing the kick will not count until after the play is over. However, this has the potential to provide the reverse of the intended result: the invalid first kick could miss or be blocked, only to be followed by a successful second kick, or—if the kick is particularly risky—it could give the kicker a "practice kick" that, if successful, could give the kicker even more confidence, as was the case with a 64-yard Jake Bates field goal that the St. Louis Battlehawks unsuccessfully tried to ice in 2024.

== Effectiveness ==
A study published in the journal Chance looked at every field-goal attempt made in the 2002 and 2003 NFL seasons, including playoffs, and concluded that, for "pressure kicks", i.e., those made with three minutes or less remaining in the game or overtime period which would tie the game or put the kicking team in the lead, for attempted kicks in the 40–55 yard range, icing the kicker caused the percentage of successful attempts to drop by about ten percent for an average kicker on a sunny day. On shorter kicks, the effect was found to be negligible. However, the statistical significance of the difference found – which amounted to four kicks out of 39 attempts – has been questioned, and a different review of "pressure kicks" (defined as above except within two minutes, not three) in the NFL regular season from 1991 to 2005 showed an insignificant difference between non-iced kicks (457 out of 637, or 71.7%) and iced kicks (152 out of 211, or 72.0%).

== In other sports ==
A similar tactic is also common in basketball, known as icing the shooter. A team may call a timeout just before the opposing team's free-throw shooter is given the ball on the final free throw, in an attempt to disrupt the shooter, typically if a missed free throw allows for the calling team to either have a chance to win the game with a successful field goal, or allows the calling team to preserve a lead.

== See also ==
- Gamesmanship
