= Associated British Picture Corporation =

British film production company (1927–1970)

- Industry: Film, television
- Founded: 1927; 99 years ago
- Defunct: 1970; 56 years ago
- Fate: Folded into EMI-Elstree
- Successor: EMI-Elstree
- Headquarters: England
- Subsidiaries: Associated British Cinemas Ltd.; Associated British Pathé Ltd.; Associated British Cinemas (Television) Ltd.; Associated British Productions Ltd.

Associated British Picture Corporation (ABPC), originally British International Pictures (BIP), was a British film production, distribution and exhibition company active from 1927 until 1970 when it was absorbed into EMI. ABPC also owned approximately 500 cinemas in Britain by 1943, and in the 1950s and 60s owned a station on the ITV television network. The studio was partly owned by Warner Bros. from about 1940 until 1969; the American company also owned a stake in ABPC's distribution arm, Warner-Pathé, from 1958. It formed one half of a vertically integrated film industry duopoly in Britain with the Rank Organisation.

== History ==
=== From 1927 to 1945 ===
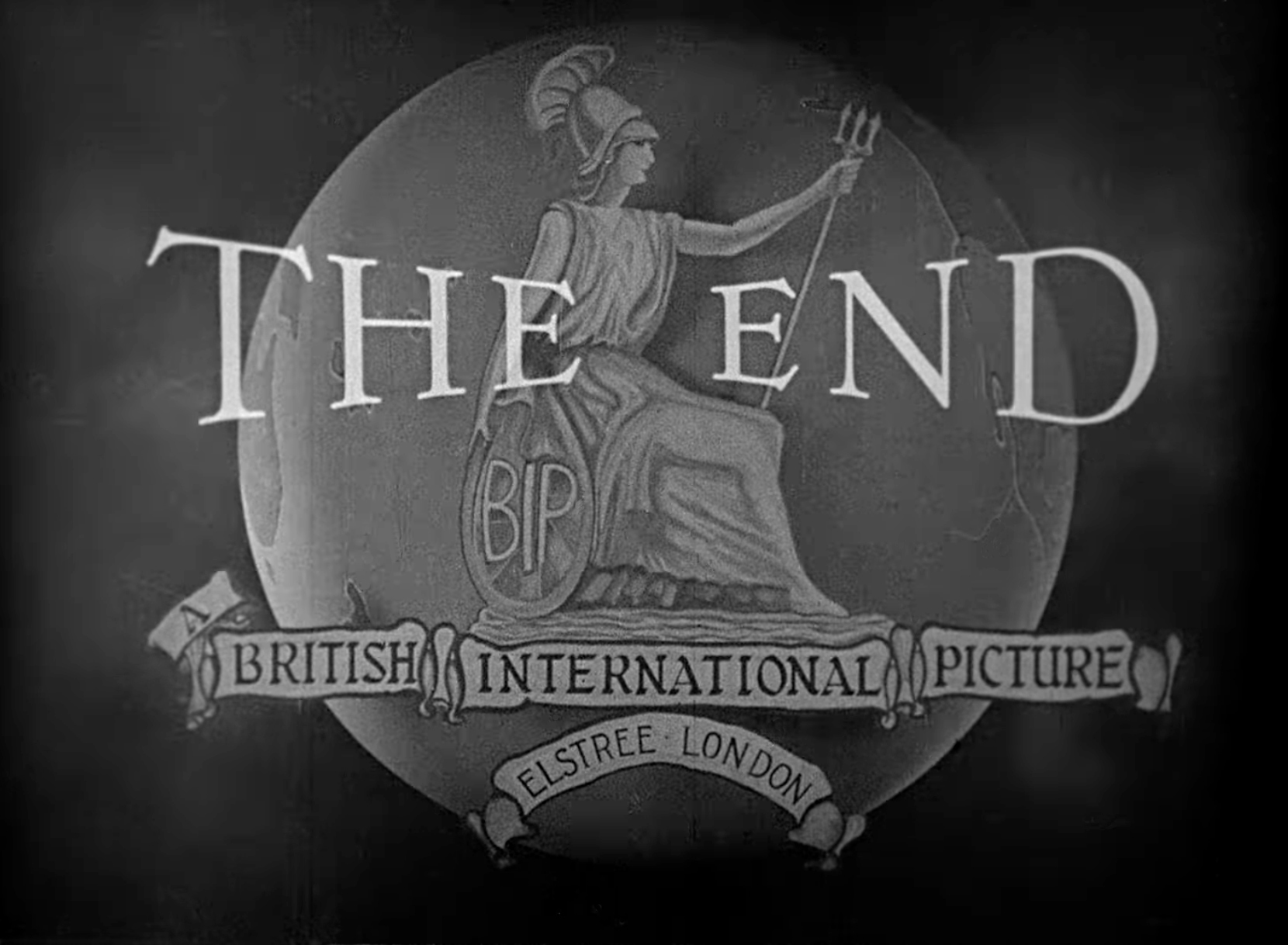
Closing screen for the British International Pictures film The Informer (1929)

The company was founded during 1927 by Scottish solicitor John Maxwell after he had purchased British National Pictures Studios and its Elstree Studios complex and merged it with his ABC Cinemas circuit, renaming the company British International Pictures. The Wardour Film Company, with Maxwell as chairman, was the distributor of BIP films. He appointed Joseph Grossman, formerly manager of the Stoll Studios, his Studio Manager.

During its early years the company's most prominent work was that directed by Alfred Hitchcock, including the film Blackmail (1929), usually regarded as the first British all-talkie. Hitchcock worked on a total of twelve pictures for the company before leaving in 1933 to work for the rival British Gaumont, due to his dissatisfaction with the projects he was assigned at British International.

Under Maxwell's paternalistic management the company prospered and during 1933 it acquired British Pathé, which as Associated British-Pathé now functioned as the distribution division. The company was renamed Associated British Picture Corporation in 1933 and was now in a position to vertically integrate production, distribution and exhibition of films.

After Maxwell's death in October 1940, his widow Catherine sold a large number of shares to Warner Bros., who, although the Maxwell family remained the largest shareholders, were able to exercise a measure of control. The studio at Elstree was taken over by the government for the duration of the war. Film production was restricted to B-Pictures made at the company's smaller studio in Welwyn Garden City, which closed in 1950.

In 1940 four of its five films were hits at the local box office.

=== After the Second World War ===
Much of the output of the studio was routine, which restricted its success outside the UK, but after World War II, the company contracted with Warner (by now the largest shareholder, owning 40% of the studio) for the distribution of its films in the United States.

Robert Clark was head of production for the company between 1949 and 1958, and insisted on tight budgeting and the use of pre-existing properties such as books or plays as these already had a demonstrated "public value". Of the 21 films made by ABPC during the 1950s, only two were derived from original screenplays. German-born Frederick Gotfurt was Clark's scenario editor in this period, but his command of English was imperfect and the contracted actor Richard Todd doubted Gotfurt's ability to assess the quality of the dialogue in a script. "It was a dreadful place", said Richard Attenborough when remembering ABPC's Elstree facility. "It created nothing in terms of a feeling of commitment." During this period though, the company produced its best remembered titles such as The Dam Busters (Michael Anderson, 1954), and Ice Cold in Alex (1958), whose director J. Lee Thompson was ABPC's most productive during the 1950s.

In 1958, Associated Talking Pictures, the parent company of Ealing Films, was acquired.

=== Expansion into television ===
In 1955, the Independent Television Authority (ITA) awarded one of the four initial contracts for commercial television in the UK to ABPC (after original awardee Kemsley-Winnick Television collapsed). The contract was to provide programming on the new ITV network in the Midlands and northern England on Saturdays and Sundays. The board of ABPC had been unconvinced by the merits of entering the television market, but were eventually convinced by the ITA who believed they were the only acceptable option to take the contract. Former head of British Pathé Howard Thomas was appointed as the station's managing director.

Under the name ABC Television, the company came on the air in stages between February and November 1956. Among many television series ABC produced were Opportunity Knocks, The Avengers, Redcap, and the long-running Armchair Theatre drama anthology series.

Following a reallocation of the ITV franchises, ABC Television ceased to exist in 1968; however, unwilling to eject ABPC from the system, the ITA awarded the contract for weekdays in London to a new company that would be joint-owned by ABPC and British Electric Traction (parent company of outgoing franchisee Rediffusion), with ABPC holding a 51% controlling stake. Both companies were initially reluctant to this "shotgun merger", but eventually the new station, christened Thames Television, took to the air in July 1968 (two days after ABC's last broadcast). The 51% controlling stake passed to EMI upon its acquisition of ABPC the following year.

=== From 1958 onwards ===
Policies changed after Clark left in January 1958. New projects from the company were limited to those using contracted television comedy performers, and investment in independent productions. The use of Elstree for television production increased. Later successful features from ABPC itself included several films built around the pop singer Cliff Richard, such as The Young Ones (1961) and Summer Holiday (1963). The same year, ABPC acquired Associated Talking Pictures (parent of the original Ealing Studios) from The Rank Organisation (who had bought the studio in 1944).

In 1962, the company acquired 50% of the shares of Anglo-Amalgamated, and made an arrangement with the Grade Organisation to support the production of films by independent producers. During the 1960s, however, the fortunes of the company declined, and in 1967 Seven Arts, the new owners of Warner, decided to dispose of its holdings in ABPC which was purchased in 1968 by EMI, who acquired the remaining stock the following year. (For the subsequent history, see EMI Films.) The entire ABPC library is now owned by StudioCanal.

== Subsidiaries of Associated British Picture Corporation ==
=== Wholly owned ===
- Associated British Productions Ltd. – Associated British Studios
- Associated British Cinemas Ltd. – ABC Cinemas
- Associated British-Pathé Ltd. – 1933
- Associated Talking Pictures - 1958 - Ealing Studios
- Associated British Film Distributors Ltd. – usually only known by its initials ABFD
- British and Overseas Film Sales Ltd.
- Pathé Laboratories Ltd.
- Associated British Cinemas (Television) Ltd. – 1955 – ABC Weekend TV
- A.B.C. Television Ltd. – c. 1957 – ABC Weekend TV
- A.B.C. Television Films Ltd. – 1966 – Associated British Corporation

=== Jointly owned ===
- Warner-Pathé Distributors Ltd. (50%) – from 1958
- Anglo-Amalgamated Film Distributors (50%) – from 1962
- Thames Television Ltd. (51%) – from 1968

== Select filmography ==
- Spring Handicap (1937)
- Hold My Hand (1938)
- Jane Steps Out (1938)
- Star of the Circus (1938)
- Premiere (1938)
- Oh Boy! (1938)
- Marigold (1938)
- Queer Cargo (1938)
- Hell's Cargo (1939)
- Murder in Soho (1939)
- Poison Pen (1939)
- The Outsider (1939)
- Just like a Woman (1939)
- The Gang's All Here (1939)
- Lucky to Me (1939)
- Bulldog Sees It Through (1940)
- The Middle Watch (1940)
- The House of the Arrow (1940)
- The Flying Squad (1940)
- Dead Man's Shoes (1940)
- Spring Meeting (1941)
- East of Piccadilly (1941)
- My Wife's Family (1941)
- Banana Ridge (1942)
- It Happened One Sunday (1944)
- I Live in Grosvenor Square (1945) - Herbert Wilcox
- Quiet Weekend (1946)
- Piccadilly Incident (1946)
- Temptation Harbour (1947)
- My Brother Jonathan (1948)
- Brighton Rock (1948)
- Private Angelo (1949) - Pilgrim
- The Queen of Spades (1949)
- Silent Dust (1949)
- Landfall (1949)
- For Them That Trespass (1949)
- The Hasty Heart (1949)
- Murder Without Crime (1950)
- No Place for Jennifer (1950)
- Portrait of Clare (1950)
- The Dancing Years (1950)
- Laughter in Paradise (1951)
- The Franchise Affair (1951)
- Young Wives' Tale (1951)
- Castle in the Air (1952)
- Father's Doing Fine (1952)
- Top Secret (1952)
- The Woman's Angle (1952)
- The Yellow Balloon (1953) - Marble Arch Productions
- Will Any Gentleman...? (1953)
- The House of the Arrow (1953)
- Isn't Life Wonderful! (1953)
- The Good Beginning (1953)
- The Weak and the Wicked (1954)
- Happy Ever After (1954)
- For Better, for Worse (1954) - Kenwood Productions
- The Dam Busters (1955)
- You Can't Escape (1956)
- Yield to the Night (1956)
- It's Great to Be Young (1956) - Marble Arch
- Now and Forever (1956)
- The Good Companions (1957)
- These Dangerous Years (1957) - Everest
- No Time for Tears (1957)
- Woman in a Dressing Gown (1957)
- Small Hotel (1957) - Welwyn
- A Lady Mislaid (1958) - Welwyn
- I Was Monty's Double (1958)
- Ice Cold in Alex (1958)
- The Young and the Guilty (1958)
- Wonderful Things! (1958) - Everest
- Chase a Crooked Shadow (1958)
- The Moonraker (1958)
- Girls at Sea (1958)
- The Lady Is a Square (1958) - Herbert Wilcox
- No Trees in the Street (1959)
- Operation Bullshine (1959)
- The Siege of Pinchgut (1959) - Ealing
- The Rebel (1960)
- School for Scoundrels (1960)
- Sands of the Desert (1960)
- Too Hot to Handle (1960)
- Hell Is a City (1960)
- Follow That Horse! (1960)
- The Long and the Short and the Tall (1961)
- Petticoat Pirates (1961)
- Hand in Hand (1961)
- The Young Ones (1961)
- Don't Bother to Knock (1961)
- We Joined the Navy (1962)
- Guns of Darkness (1962)
- Go to Blazes (1962)
- Summer Holiday (1963)
- The Punch and Judy Man (1963)
- West 11 (1963)
- The Cracksman (1963)
- The World Ten Times Over (1963)
- Crooks in Cloisters (1964)
- The Bargee (1964)
- Wonderful Life (1964)
- Mister Ten Per Cent (1967)
