= Father's Doing Fine =

1952 British film by Henry Cass

- Directed by: Henry Cass
- Written by: Anne Burnaby
- Based on: Little Lambs Eat Ivy by Noel Langley
- Produced by: Victor Skutezky
- Starring: Richard Attenborough; Heather Thatcher; Noel Purcell; Virginia McKenna
- Cinematography: Erwin Hillier
- Edited by: Edward B. Jarvis
- Music by: Philip Green; Harold Smart
- Production company: Marble Arch Productions
- Distributed by: Associated British-Pathé; Stratford Pictures (US)
- Release date: August 1952
- Running time: 83 minutes
- Country: United Kingdom
- Language: English
- Box office: £127,822 (UK)

Father's Doing Fine is a 1952 British comedy film directed by Henry Cass and starring Richard Attenborough, Heather Thatcher, and Noel Purcell, and featuring Sid James. It was written by Anne Burnaby based on the 1948 play Little Lambs Eat Ivy by Noel Langley.

== Plot ==
Eccentric upper-class widow Lady Buckering lives in splendour in Hampstead, but behind the scenes is struggling with poverty and bringing up four demanding daughters, one of whom is about to have a baby. Also of concern is the very nervous father-to-be and how exactly to deal with her light-fingered butler. All problems disappear in a happy ending and Lady Buckering marries the family doctor.

== Cast ==
- Richard Attenborough as Dougall
- Heather Thatcher as Lady Buckering
- Noel Purcell as Shaughnessy
- George Thorpe as Dr Drew
- Diane Hart as Doreen
- Susan Stephen as Bicky
- Mary Germaine as Gerda
- Virginia McKenna as Catherine
- Jack Watling as Clifford Magill
- Peter Hammond as Roly
- Brian Worth as Wilfred
- Sid James as Taxi Driver
- Ambrosine Phillpotts as Nurse Pynegar
- Wensley Pithey as Police Constable
- Jonathan Field as Zookeeper
- Harry Locke as Father in Zoo

== Production ==
The film was financed by the Elstree Group a financing scheme that operated for British films made by Associated British Pictures Corporation in the early 1950s. Associated British would make movies with part of the fiance being provided by the National Film Finance Corporation.

It was shot at Associated British's Elstree Studios with sets designed by the art director Donald M. Ashton.

== Critical reception ==
The Monthly Film Bulletin wrote: "With the exception of George Thorpe as the doctor and Heather Thatcher as the mother, the youthful cast of this artificial and laboured comedy are all inclined to over-play their parts. Despite this excessive exuberance, however, this is a moderately entertaining film which will doubtless prove popular. The colour is quite good."

Picture Show wrote: "This lively, crazy, domestic comedy deals in a crazy way with crazy people – a scatter-brained mama suffering from being awfully hard up, and her four daughters suffering from affairs of the heart, while they are robbed by a butler. It is brightly directed and acted."

TV Guide called it a "Fast-moving, barely plotted comedy," and "Unpretentious entertainment."

The Radio Times wrote "such is the precision of Henry Cass's direction and the exuberance of the performances that it's difficult not to be sucked into this frantic world of scatterbrained daughters, disastrous share deals and crooked butlers," concluding that "The pace disguises the fact that the humour has dated somewhat, but there's rarely a dull moment."

In British Sound Films: The Studio Years 1928–1959 David Quinlan rated the film as "good", writing: "Busy boisterous comedy, chock full of entrances and exits. Funny too."
