= Gamesmanship =

Game strategy of dubious methods

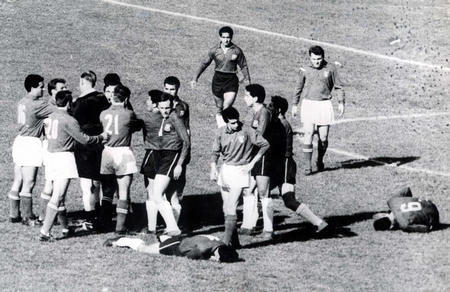
Feigning, exaggerating or drawing out an injury is a common strategy in association football to draw out time and an example of gamesmanship.

Gamesmanship is the use of dubious (although not technically illegal) methods to win or gain a serious advantage in a game or sport. It has been described as "pushing the rules to the limit without getting caught, using whatever dubious methods possible to achieve the desired end". It may be inferred that the term derives from the idea of playing for the game (i.e. to win at any cost) as opposed to sportsmanship, which derives from the idea of playing for sport. The term was popularized by Stephen Potter's humorous 1947 book, The Theory and Practice of Gamesmanship (or the Art of Winning Games without Actually Cheating). It had, however, been used before by Ian Coster in his autobiographic book Friends in Aspic, published in 1939, where it was attributed to Francis Meynell.

== Alleged origins ==
Potter cites the origin of gamesmanship to be a tennis match in which he and the philosopher C. E. M. Joad competed against two younger and fitter men who were outplaying them fairly comfortably. On returning a serve, Joad hit the ball straight into the back-netting 12 feet (3.7 m) behind the back-line. While the opponents were preparing for the next serve, Joad "called across the net in an even tone: 'Kindly say clearly, please, whether the ball was in or out.'" Being young, polite university students, their opponents offered to replay the point, but Joad declined. Because they were young and polite, the slight suggestion by Joad that their etiquette and sportsmanship were in question was extremely off-putting, and distracted them for the rest of the contest. Potter and Joad went on to win the match.

== Techniques ==
Common techniques of gamesmanship include:

1. Breaking the flow of an opponent's play (Potter insisted 'There is only one rule; BREAK THE FLOW.')
2. Causing an opponent to take the game less seriously or to overthink their position
3. Intentionally making a "mistake" which gains an advantage over an opponent

While the first method is more common at higher levels of sports, the last two are more powerful in amateur games.

=== Breaking the flow ===
Examples of "flow-breaking" methods include:

- Delay of game, that is taking too long to resume play.
  - Taking too long to take to the field before a match or after half-time, thus forcing the opposition team to wait for a prolonged period before the match starts or resumes.
  - In darts, a player intentionally taking a long time to take their darts out of the dartboard.
  - In cricket, coming out to bat with two right-handed gloves and then wasting time sorting out the problem.
  - In rugby, taking too long to pack down in a scrum, thus wasting time.
  - In tennis, when serving, taking a long time between serves and making the receiver wait; or when receiving, getting into position in such a way that the server is distracted.
  - In sprint running events, taking too long to settle in the starting blocks, inducing other competitors to commit a false start.
- Feigning injury to reduce advertised ability. The skilled gamesman can counter this tactic by waiting until the game has been in play for some time, before revealing that they suffer from a far more serious condition, such as a heart defect.
- In billiards or snooker, intentionally standing in the opponent's line of sight, and then suddenly moving when the opponent is about to shoot under the guise of getting out of their sight line. "More or less at the last moment, leaping into the correct position with exaggerated agility, and stand rigidly with head bowed."
- Distracting the opposing player by complaining about other people who might be (but were not) distracting the opposing player. Potter, who always insisted that the good gamesman must give the appearance of being a good sportsman, recommended this approach. For example, if an opponent is about to take a shot at billiards, it is bad gamesmanship to fidget and whistle but good gamesmanship to distract him by loudly requesting silence from spectators: 'Simulate annoyance, on the opponent's behalf, with the onlookers'.
- When winning a point maintain direct eye contact with opponent, but when losing one always avoid direct eye contact.
- In baseball, a batter disrupting a pitcher's flow by calling a time-out just before he delivers the pitch.
- When losing an outdoor game, feigning a deep, informed and more than amateur interest in e.g. botany or ornithology, in order to convey a breadth of interests and suggest to the opponent that losing is not of concern. This can cause the opponent to relax their attention, or at any rate rob them of the satisfaction of winning. Potter termed this 'the natural hampette...See Gardens for Gamesmen, or When to be Fond of Flowers(15s.)'.
- In tennis, hitting directly at the opponent. This is usually done when the player is next to the net. Taking a medical time out or toilet break when then opponent is experiencing a successful run.
- In American football, calling a time out the instant before a game-winning or game-tying field goal or extra point to break the normal flow of play. This is known as "icing" or "freezing" the kicker.

=== Causing the opponent to overthink ===
Examples of methods designed to cause the opponent to overthink or to not take the game seriously enough include:

- Giving intentionally vague advice in the hope of making the opponent focus on their play. In such "Advicemanship", 'the advice must be vague, to make certain it is not helpful', although Potter also noted that 'according to some authorities the advice should be quite genuine and perfectly practical'.
- Asking one's opponent's advice for a (fictitious) match the following day, against an implied stronger opponent.
- Claiming that the game being played "just isn't my sport", or claiming less expertise than the player actually possesses (a mild form of hustling).
- The converse approach, suggesting a level of expertise far higher than the player actually possesses, can also be effective. For example, although gamesmanship frowns on simple distractions like whistling loudly while an opponent takes a shot, it is good gamesmanship to do so when taking a shot oneself, suggesting as it does a level of carefree detachment which the opponent does not possess.
- In American football, the very common practice of taking one or more timeouts to give an opposing kicker an excessive amount of time to think about a critical kick; most often a field goal or extra point but sometimes a potential on-side kick. The intent is to cause the kicker to get overly stressed about making a mistake and hopefully create a self-fulfilling prophecy. This is commonly referred to as "icing the kicker." A common variant of this strategy is to attempt to call the timeout right before the ball is snapped, so that there is not enough time to stop the play and the opposing kicker has to attempt the same kick twice.
- "Icing" is also used, albeit less frequently, in basketball. In late-game situations with a player shooting free throws, it is not uncommon for the opposing team to take a timeout. This is commonly referred to as "icing the shooter".

=== Other ===
- If the players personally know or have experience with each other, lies and other conversation topics can be used. In wrestling or many combat sports, it could be targeting a limb which the opponent has been carrying an injury.

=== Intentional "mistakes" ===
Examples of intentional "mistakes" designed to gain an advantage:

- In bridge, intentionally misdealing and then engaging in chaotic bidding, knowing that the hand will be void anyway, in the hope that 'opponents will…be unable to form a working judgement of the opponents' bidding form'.
- In poker, intentionally raising out of turn, to induce players to give a free card.
- In baseball, intentionally dropping a caught ball, to create a force play on the baserunners (hence the infield fly rule).

All of the above are considered very close to cheating, and the abuser of gamesmanship techniques will find himself penalized in most serious sports and games tournaments, as well as being deemed (if caught) a "bad sport".

The rules of the International Defensive Pistol Association for its practical shooting matches specifically state that any illegal action taken with the intent of gaining a competitive advantage is penalized as a "Failure to Do Right", adding 20 seconds to the competitor's time. This penalty is rarely given, partly because of its highly subjective nature.

== Association football ==
In association football, it is considered good sportsmanship to kick the ball out of play if a player on the opposing side is injured; when the ball is to be thrown in, it is also considered to be good sportsmanship in this situation to kick it (or throw it) back to the other team who had intentionally kicked it out. Gamesmanship arises in this situation when, rather than passing the ball back to the side who kicked the ball out, the injured player's teammates keep the ball after the throw-in. Whilst not illegal or against the rules of the sport, it is heavily frowned upon.

A high-profile example occurred during the game between Portugal and the Netherlands in the round of 16 of the 2006 FIFA World Cup, where the game, already marred by numerous cautions and four red cards, further deteriorated because of such an incident. Also, in a 1998–99 FA Cup fifth round match between Arsenal and Sheffield United, Arsenal's winning goal scored under these circumstances (although as a result of a misunderstanding rather than a deliberate action) was so contentious the Arsenal manager Arsène Wenger offered to replay the match. Sheffield United accepted, though Arsenal went on to win the second game by the same score, 2–1.

Feigning injury to cause the ball to be kicked out is another example of gamesmanship intended to break the flow of play, though if detected, it may be regarded as unsportsmanlike conduct, which is a breach of the laws and hence is no longer gamesmanship. In response to claims of feigned injuries during the 2006 World Cup, the Premier League asked players, managers and referees to end the custom as of the 2006–07 season, instead preferring a referee alone to determine whether a break in play is needed. This is done particularly by goalkeepers, as the game cannot progress if one of the goalkeepers calling for medical assistance.

When a free kick is awarded, members of the defending team will often pick up the ball and drop it back behind them as they retreat. Whilst not throwing the ball away, which would be an infringement, the purpose is to prevent a swiftly taken free kick.

When the goalkeeper catches the ball, opposing players will often stand in front of him to prevent him from quickly setting the ball back into play and possibly providing a counter-attack.

Some goalkeepers are known to use gamesmanship in an attempt to gain an advantage on penalty kicks. This was particularly notable in the 2022 World Cup final, where Argentine goalkeeper Emi Martinez employed gamesmanship while French goalkeeper Hugo Lloris did not, the latter later stating "There are some things I can't do... rattling my opponents, crossing that line... I'm too rational and honest a man to go that way."

== Usage outside of games ==
The term "gamesmanship" is also used for similar techniques used in non-game situations, such as negotiations and elections.

Each form is frequently used as a means of describing dubious methods of winning and/or psychological tricks used to intimidate or confuse one's opponent. Technically speaking, these tactics are one-upmanship, defined in a later book by Potter as the art of being one-up on somebody else.

The term also appears in art theory to mean playfulness, as in "literary gamesmanship".

== The gamesman versus the pure player ==
Potter's double-edged ironies did not spare the gamesman himself (he slyly named one prominent protagonist 'Bzo, U., holder (1947) Yugo-Slav Gamesmanship Championship', for example). Potter acknowledged repeatedly that "the way of the gamesman is hard, his training strict, his progress slow, his disappointments many", and recognised that as a result "the assiduous student of gamesmanship has little time for the minutiae of the game itself – little opportunity for learning how to play the shots, for instance". Yet one of his "correspondents" owlishly admits, "there is no doubt that a knowledge of the game itself sometimes helps the gamesman".

Hence "perhaps the most difficult type for the gamesman to play is the man who indulges in pure play. He gets down to it, he gets on with it, he plays each shot according to its merits, and his own powers, without a trace of exhibitionism, and no by-play whatever". The book gloomily concludes, "we amateurs have to fight against the growing menace of young people who insist on playing their various games for the fun of the thing...indulging rather too freely, if the truth were known, in pure play".

== See also ==
- Brinkmanship
- Diving (association football)
- Flop (basketball)
- Gaming the system
- Malicious compliance
- Match fixing
- Metagame
- One-upmanship
- Rules lawyer
- School for Scoundrels
- Sledging (cricket)
- Supermac
- Unsportsmanlike conduct
- Work-to-rule
