= Fair Play Award =

Fair Play Award may refer to:

== Association football ==
- Kategoria Superiore Fair Play Award, in Albania
- FIFA Fair Play Award
- MLS Fair Play Award
- North American Soccer League Fair Play Award

== Other ==
- Indian Premier League Fair Play Award
- Giro d'Italia#Minor classifications

== See also ==
- Fair Play Trophy (disambiguation)
