= Fair Play Trophy =

Fair Play Trophy may refer to:

== Association football ==
- FIFA Club World Cup Fair Play Trophy
- FIFA Women's World Cup Fair Play Trophy
- FIFA World Cup Fair Play Trophy
- Pakistan Premier League Fair Play Trophy

== Other ==
- Canada West University Hockey Fair Play Trophy

== See also ==
- Fair Play Award (disambiguation)
