= Henry Cass =

British film director (1903–1989)

- Born: 24 June 1903; London, UK
- Died: 15 March 1989 (aged 85)
- Education: Royal Academy of Dramatic Art
- Spouse: Joan Hopkins

Henry Cass (24 June 1902 – 15 March 1989) was a British director, particularly prolific in film in the horror and comedy genres. Previously an actor, he was also a prolific stage director of classical theatre at the Old Vic in the 1930s.

In 1923, Lee DeForest filmed Cass for a short film Henry Cass Demonstration Film made in DeForest's Phonofilm sound-on-film process. The film was previewed at the Engineers Society of New York on 12 April 1923, and premiered at the Rivoli Theatre in New York on 15 April 1923 with 17 other short Phonofilms.

Cass was married to the actress Joan Hopkins.

== Filmography ==
- Lancashire Luck (1937)
- 29 Acacia Avenue (1945)
- The Glen Is Ours (1946)
- The Glass Mountain (1949)
- No Place for Jennifer (1950)
- Last Holiday (1950)
- Young Wives' Tale (1951)
- Castle in the Air (1952)
- Father's Doing Fine (1952)
- Breakaway (1955)
- Windfall (1955)
- Reluctant Bride (1955)
- No Smoking (1955)
- Bond of Fear (1956)
- High Terrace (1956)
- Professor Tim (1957)
- The Crooked Sky (1957)
- Booby Trap (1957)
- Blood of the Vampire (1958)
- Man Who Couldn't Walk (1960)
- The Hand (1960)
- Boyd's Shop (1960)
- Mr. Brown Comes Down the Hill (1965)
- Give a Dog a Bone (1965) MRA's Westminster Theatre, London
- Happy Deathday (1968) also co-author with Peter Howard (journalist).

== Bibliography ==
- Brian McFarlane & Anthony Slide. The Encyclopedia of British Film: Fourth Edition. Oxford University Press, 2013.
