= Cyril Frankel =

British film and television director (1921–2017)

- Born: Cyril Solomon Israel Frankel; 28 December 1921; Stoke Newington, London, England, UK
- Died: 7 June 2017 (aged 95); UK
- Occupations: Film director Television director
- Years active: 1953–1990

Cyril Solomon Israel Frankel (28 December 1921 – 7 June 2017) was a British film and television director. His career in television began in 1953 and he directed for over 30 TV programmes until 1990. He directed many episodes of popular British TV shows, such as The Avengers, and the pilot episodes of the ITC Entertainment shows Randall and Hopkirk (Deceased) and Department S in 1969. In 1970, he directed "Timelash", an episode of UFO, which he described as a very interesting script and one of his personal favourites.

Frankel also directed many documentaries and feature films, including Never Take Sweets from a Stranger (1960) and School for Scoundrels (1960; taking over from Robert Hamer, who was credited as sole director). One of his films, Man of Africa (1953) - the first film to feature a cast made up of relatively unknown black actors - was not released and was lost for some time. A complete copy has since been discovered and has been screened at a number of international film festivals.

In terms of documentaries, Frankel supervised some of the films that were broadcast for the BBC arts series Monitor (1958–65), among which was the first ballet programme to be filmed and edited to the choreography. Prior to his retirement, he became the ceramics expert for Bonhams auction house. A book, Modern Pots: Hans Coper, Lucie Rie and their Contemporaries - The Lisa Sainsbury Collection, was co-authored by Frankel and published in 2000. His memoir, Eye to Eye, was published by Bank House Books in 2009. Frankel died on 7 June 2017 at the age of 95.

== Selected filmography ==
- Man of Africa (1953)
- Make Me an Offer (1954)
- No Time for Tears (1957)
- She Didn't Say No! (1958)
- Alive and Kicking (1959)
- Never Take Sweets from a Stranger (1960)
- School for Scoundrels (1960)
- On the Fiddle (1961)
- Don't Bother to Knock (1961)
- The Very Edge (1963)
- The Witches (1966)
- The Trygon Factor (1966)
- Permission to Kill (1975)
- Harry and Harriet (1990)
