= Patricia Moyes =

British mystery writer (1923–2000)

Patricia Pakenham-Walsh, also known as Patricia Moyes (19 January 1923 – 2 August 2000) was a British mystery writer. Her mystery novels feature C.I.D. Inspector Henry Tibbett. One of them, Who Saw Her Die (Many Deadly Returns in the USA) was nominated for an Edgar Allan Poe Award in 1971. Moyes was inducted into the Detection Club in 1971. In addition to the Tibbett mysteries, she also wrote several juveniles and short stories.

== Life and work ==
"Penny" Moyes was born in Dublin, Ireland, on 19 January 1923, the daughter of Marion ("Molly") Strachan and Ernest Pakenham-Walsh, who had been in the Indian civil service and was a High Court judge in Madras. She was educated at Overstone Girls' School in Northampton and joined the WAAF in 1939. In 1946 Peter Ustinov hired her as technical assistant on his film School for Secrets.

She became his personal assistant for the next eight years. In 1960 she co-wrote the screenplay for the film School for Scoundrels starring Ian Carmichael, Terry-Thomas, and Alastair Sim.

During her next job as an Assistant Editor for London Vogue, Moyes also translated Jean Anouilh's 1940 play Léocadia as Time Remembered. In London (1955), the major roles were taken by Paul Scofield, Margaret Rutherford, and Mary Ure. The 1957 Broadway production – starring Richard Burton, Helen Hayes, and Susan Strasberg — received several Tony Awards. The success of Time Remembered enabled Moyes to leave Vogue and start writing mysteries.

== Personal life ==
She married photographer John Moyes in 1951; they divorced in 1959. She later married James Haszard, a linguist at the International Monetary Fund in The Hague.

== Death ==
She died at her home on the island of Virgin Gorda (British Virgin Islands) on 2 August 2000, aged 77, from undisclosed causes.

== Bibliography ==
=== Inspector Henry Tibbett mysteries ===
- Dead Men Don't Ski (1959)
- The Sunken Sailor (1961) - US title: Down Among the Dead Men
- Death on the Agenda (1962)
- Murder a la Mode (1963)
- Falling Star (1964)
- Johnny Under Ground (1965)
- Murder Fantastical (1967)
- Death and the Dutch Uncle (1968)
- Who Saw Her Die? (1970) - US title: Many Deadly Returns
- Season of Snows and Sins (1971)
- The Curious Affair of the Third Dog (1973)
- Black Widower (1975)
- To Kill a Coconut (1977) - US title: The Coconut Killings
- Who Is Simon Warwick? (1978)
- Angel Death (1980)
- A Six-Letter Word for Death (1983)
- Night Ferry to Death (1985)
- Black Girl, White Girl (1989)
- Twice in a Blue Moon (1993)

=== Other books ===
- Time Remembered (play, 1955; translation of Anouilh's Leocadia)
- Helter-Skelter (1968) Mystery for children
- After All, They're Only Cats (1973)
- How to Talk to Your Cat (1978)
- Who Killed Father Christmas? And Other Unseasonable Demises (Crippen & Landru,1996; short stories)

== See also ==
- Patricia Moyes at IMDb
- Patricia Moyes' bibliography, with some biographical elements
- A short article about her first novel. Dead Men Don't Ski
