= The Yellow Balloon (film) =

1953 film

- Directed by: J. Lee Thompson (credited as J. Lee-Thompson)
- Written by: Anne Burnaby; J. Lee Thompson
- Produced by: Victor Skutezky
- Starring: Andrew Ray; Kenneth More; Kathleen Ryan; William Sylvester
- Cinematography: Gilbert Taylor
- Edited by: Richard Best
- Music by: Philip Green
- Production company: Marble Arch Productions
- Distributed by: Associated British Picture Corporation; Allied Artists (US)
- Release date: 10 February 1953
- Running time: 78 minutes
- Country: United Kingdom
- Language: English
- Box office: £116,245 (UK)

The Yellow Balloon is a 1953 British drama film directed by J. Lee Thompson and starring Andrew Ray, William Sylvester, Kathleen Ryan, Kenneth More and Hy Hazell. It was written by Anne Burnaby and Thompson, distributed by Associated British and produced by the company's Marble Arch Productions.

== Plot ==
The film is set in the immediate aftermath of the Second World War, in London's East End, amongst the bomb sites.

12-year-old Frankie Palmer loses the sixpence his father has given him to buy a large yellow balloon from a street seller which the boy has set his heart on. He sees that a friend of his, young Ronnie Williams, has already bought one and Frankie snatches it from him and runs away with it, with Ronnie in hot pursuit.

Ronnie chases Frankie into a large, bombed-out house and they are running about in the ruins when Ronnie slips and falls 30 ft (9 m) to his death. Frankie scrambles down to help, but realises that there is nothing he can do. Hiding in the shadows and seeing it all, Len Turner, a criminal on the run and using the ruins as a hideout from the police, convinces Frankie that the police will arrest the boy and charge him with the murder of his friend for pushing him to his death and that they must both make their getaway.

Although Frankie and Len agree it was an accident, Len is adamant that the police will not see it that way and Frankie goes off with him. Len blackmails Frankie into stealing money from his parents to help fund Len's escape and then uses the boy as a decoy in a pub robbery that goes horribly wrong when Len murders the pub owner.

Realising that Frankie is the only witness to his crime, Len knows he must kill the boy, too. This develops into a terrifying hide-and-seek chase through a bomb-damaged, abandoned and highly-perilous London Underground station, with Len hot on the heels of Frankie, who is desperately trying to escape with his life.

A tube driver passing at speed through the station sees the pursuit as he speeds past the platform. He reports it at the next station and the police are alerted. They rescue Frankie. In a poetic-justice ending Len walks over a beam over a long drop before falling to his death.

== Cast ==
- Andrew Ray as Frankie Palmer
- Kathleen Ryan as Emily Palmer
- Kenneth More as Ted Palmer
- Bernard Lee as PC Chapman
- Stephen Fenemore as Ron Williams
- William Sylvester as Len
- Marjorie Rhodes as Jessie Stokes
- Peter Jones as Sid
- Eliot Makeham as pawnbroker
- Sid James as barrow boy
- Veronica Hurst as Sunday School teacher
- Sandra Dorne as Iris
- Campbell Singer as Potter
- Laurie Main as bibulous customer
- Hy Hazell as Mary
- Edward Evans as PC Patterson
- Richard O'Sullivan as boy singing at Sunday School
- Brenda de Banzie as fruit stall customer
- Hilda Barry as newspaper seller
- Hugh Moxey as police officer
- Peggy Ann Clifford as cafe owner

== Production ==
The film was financed by the Elstree Group a financing scheme that operated for British films made by Associated British Pictures Corporation in the early 1950s. Associated British would make movies with part of the fiance being provided by the National Film Finance Corporation.

The film was based on an idea of Anne Burnaby. She originally wanted the character of Mary to be a prostitute but was not allowed for censorship reasons. Star Andrew Ray had just appeared in The Mudlark. It was Thompson's second feature as director.

Filming began on 21 April 1952. It was made at Elstree Studios with sets designed by the art director Robert Jones. Location shooting took place around Bayswater and Chelsea including Queensway tube station.

As filming continued, Andrew Ray's 13th birthday on 31 May gave rise to a photo opportunity at Elstree Studios, showing him blowing out the candles on his birthday cake, surrounded by his parents and other children from the film.

== Censorship ==
The Yellow Balloon was one of the first films to be passed with the then new Adults Only "X" certificate by the British Board of Film Censors, which barred anyone under the age of 16 years from being allowed into a cinema to see the film. This was because the censor felt that the chase through the London Underground station in the last reel would be very frightening for young children. Andrew Ray, 13 years old when the film was shot in 1952 and when it was released in 1953, was disappointed that he wasn't allowed to go into a cinema to see his own film because he was under the age of 16.

However, after complaints from cinema exhibitors that the "X" certificate wasn't really necessary for the film and it was losing them the family audience they had relied on up until that time, the BBFC eventually relented and in October 1953 they re-classified the film with an "A" certificate (children under 16 allowed in to see the film if accompanied by an adult). (NOTE: the distributor requested it be reclassified in April 1953, which was rejected and it retained its 'X' certificate).

== Reception ==
The Monthly Film Bulletin wrote: "This is a well-handled melodrama, whose distinction is largely due to the effective photography. The camera is more concerned with the individual than the scene, and the choice of camera angles makes many routine situations fascinating. The film is admirably cast; there is a general absence of 'phoniness' which is very striking, and probably the result of everyone's close attention to how human beings really react under emotional strain."

The Observer called it "a forceful and far from stupid British film which we might have appreciated more had we not seen The Window."

Variety said it "should chalk up modest grosses."

In The New York Times, critic Bosley Crowther wrote: "it is a leisurely sort of chiller that trades intriguingly upon a youngster's far-fetched fears...The moral is, of course, that children should speak up rather than harbor their fears. But they don't. So probably the British will be able to go right on making these variably fascinating films for years."
