= Young Wives' Tale =

- Directed by: Henry Cass
- Written by: Anne Burnaby
- Based on: Young Wives' Tale by Ronald Jeans
- Produced by: Victor Skutezky
- Starring: Joan Greenwood; Nigel Patrick; Derek Farr; Guy Middleton
- Cinematography: Erwin Hillier
- Edited by: Edward B. Jarvis
- Music by: Philip Green
- Distributed by: Associated British-Pathé Limited (UK)
- Release date: November 1951 (UK)
- Running time: 79 minutes
- Country: United Kingdom
- Language: English
- Box office: £146,059 (UK)

Young Wives' Tale, also known as Fun for Four, is a 1951 British comedy film directed by Henry Cass and starring Joan Greenwood, Nigel Patrick, Derek Farr, and Guy Middleton. The film is based on the 1949 play Young Wives' Tale by Ronald Jeans. It features one of Audrey Hepburn's earliest film roles, albeit a minor one, as Eve Lester.

== Plot ==
During the post-World War II housing shortage, Bruce and Mary are a married couple who both have professional jobs and own their own house, and they let out rooms, including to another married couple, Rodney and Sabina, because Sabina is a friend of Mary. Both couples have an infant child, and the presence of a nanny for the two children exacerbates the problems caused by the crowding. Another young female lodger and Sabina's persistent old beau intensify the tensions.

== Cast ==
- Joan Greenwood as Sabina Pennant
- Nigel Patrick as Rodney Pennant
- Derek Farr as Bruce Banning
- Guy Middleton as Victor Manifold
- Athene Seyler as Nanny Gallop
- Helen Cherry as Mary Banning
- Audrey Hepburn as Eve Lester
- Fabia Drake as Nanny Blott
- Irene Handl as Nanny
- Brian Oulton as Man in pub
- Joan Sanderson as Nurse

== Critical reception ==
TV Guide noted "Broad humor is the order of the day," and rated the film 3/5 stars.
