= Frederick Gotfurt =

German screenwriter (1901–1973)

Frederick Gotfurt (born Fritz Männe Gottfurcht, 8 August 1901 – 22 February 1973) was a German-British writer, scenario editor, producer and executive. In the 1940s and 1950s he was scenario editor at Associated British Picture Corporation and was heavily relied upon by head of production Robert Clarke. He has been called a key creative influence at that company - in particular his interest in the character of "the outsider" seen displayed in Last Holiday (1950) and Portrait of Clare (1950).

== Select Credits ==
- The Girl in the Taxi (1937)
- Temptation Harbour (1947)
- A Lady Mislaid (1958) (adapted from Kenneth Horne's stageplay
