= List of Christian Scientists (religious denomination) =

== Activists, politicians, and military figures ==
=== Activists ===
- Tsianina Redfeather Blackstone (1882-1985) – Native American singer and activist
- Bonnie Carroll – President and founder of the Tragedy Assistance Program for Survivors (TAPS) (Note: Recorded a video for the Mother Church's online-only Annual Meeting in 2020 about how Christian Science supported her in her work.)
- Henry Hyde Champion (1859-1928) –Socialist activist and journalist
- Vida Goldstein (1869-1949) – Australian suffragette and social reformer.
- Sallie Holley (1818-1893) – Abolitionist and educator
- Olive Moorman Leader (1852-1930) – temperance reformer, suffragist, educator, and human rights activist
- Muriel Matters (1877-1969) – Australian suffragist and educator
- Roy Olmstead (1886-1966) – Former bootlegger turned anti-alcoholism activist
- Nettie Rogers Shuler (1862-1939) – American suffragist and author
- Marietta T. Webb (1864-1951) – Civil rights activist

=== Elected officials ===
- Nancy Witcher Astor (1879-1964) – second female Member of Parliament to be elected but the first to take her seat, serving from 1919 to 1945 (Note: In Sykes's Nancy the life of Lady Astor (1984), and her own letters, Nancy Astor’s Canadian Correspondence, 1912–1962, it is mentioned how much she promoted the religion; the effect it had on her election campaigns and her political views is mentioned in Karen J Musolf's From Plymouth to Parliament (1999))
- Fred B. Balzar (1880-1934) – 15th Governor of Nevada
- Louis J. Brann (1876-1948), 56th Governor of Maine; Mayor of Lewiston, Maine
- Owen Brewster (1888-1961) – 54th Governor of Maine, member of the United States House of Representatives and Senate
- Jocelyn Burdick (1922-2019), United States Senator
- Clarence A. Buskirk (1842-1926) – 10th Indiana Attorney General, traveling lecturer who promoted Christian Science in various countries
- Ralph Lawrence Carr (1887-1950) – 29th Governor of Colorado
- Thelma Cazalet-Keir (1899-1989) – British Conservative Member of Parliament
- Thomas M. Davis – Member of the United States House of Representatives
- David Dreier – Member of the United States House of Representatives
- Bob Goodlatte – Member of the United States House of Representatives
- William Higgs (politician) (1862-1951) – Australian Senator and member of the House of Representatives, Treasurer of Australia (Note: Became a Christian Science practitioner after retiring from politics.)
- Gustav A. Hoff (1852-1930), American businessman and Mayor of Tucson. (Note: His wife Alice A. Ford (1856–1963) was the first Christian Science practitioner in Tucson, and both were involved with the early movement there, using their own home to hold the first Christian Science services in the city.)
- Scott McCallum – 43rd Governor of Wisconsin (Note: Milwaukee Sentinel mentioned how Wisconsin's Christian Scientists "finally got their prayers answered" by his election)
- Charles H. Percy (1919-2011) – United States Senator from Illinois
- Lamar S. Smith – Member of the United States House of Representatives
- Victor Cazalet (1896-1943) – British Conservative Member of Parliament
- Margaret Wintringham (1879-1955) – Second woman to take her seat as a British Member of Parliament
- John D. Works (1847-1928) – United States Senator from California, Associate Justice of the California Supreme Court (Note: an early, possibly the earliest, example of a Christian Scientist in the US Senate)

=== Other political and military figures ===
- Mary Bartelme (1866-1954) – pioneering American judge and lawyer, referred to as "America's only woman judge"
- Dudley de Chair (1864-1958) - British Royal Navy officer and Governor of New South Wales.
- John Ehrlichman (1925-1999) – Counsel and Assistant to the President for Domestic Affairs
- Paul Gore-Booth, Baron Gore-Booth (1909-1984) – British diplomat and politician
- Thomas P. Griesa (1930-2017) – United States district judge
- H.R. Haldeman (1926-1993) – White House Chief of Staff (Note: Described as "a Christian Scientist who neither smokes nor drinks")
- Septimus J. Hanna (1845-1921) – Judge and Civil War veteran, later Christian Science practitioner and teacher
- Cecil Harcourt (1892-1959) - British naval officer, de facto governor of Hong Kong
- Philip Kerr, 11th Marquess of Lothian (1882-1940) – British politician, diplomat and newspaper editor
- Egil Krogh (1939-2020) – American lawyer, United States Under Secretary of Transportation
- Maurice Mansergh (1896-1966) - British admiral, Commander-in-Chief, Plymouth
- Ursula Mueller – UN Assistant Secretary-General for Humanitarian Affairs and Deputy Emergency Relief Coordinator in OCHA
- Charles Murray, 7th Earl of Dunmore (1841-1907) – Scottish peer, politician, explorer, author, and teacher of Christian Science
- Alexander Murray, 8th Earl of Dunmore (1871-1962) – British soldier and politician (Note: The 7th Earl and Countess of Dunmore were both early teachers of Christian Science, as were two of their daughters. Their son Alexander Murray, also known as Lord Fincastle or the 8th Earl of Dunmore, was actively involved in the church.)
- David Ogilvy, 12th Earl of Airlie (1893-1968) - Scottish peer, soldier, and courtier
- Henry Paulson – 74th United States Secretary of the Treasury
- Oliver P. Smith (1893-1977), American Marine four star general who served in WWII and the Korean War
- Stansfield Turner (1923-2018) – Admiral and former CIA Director
- William Hedgcock Webster – Director of the Federal Bureau of Investigation (FBI) from 1978 to 1987 and Director of Central Intelligence (CIA) from 1987 to 1991 (Note: mentioned in a Salon article)

== Business ==
- J. Robert Atkinson (1887-1964) – founder of the Braille Institute of America
- D. G. M. Bernard (1888-1975) - Banker in England, Hong Kong, and the Middle East.
- B. F. Brisac (1858-1940) – American business executive and humanitarian (Note: Served as First Reader at First Church of Christ, Scientist, San Francisco.)
- Dorothy Harrison Eustis (1886-1946) – founder of The Seeing Eye
- Antony Fisher (1915-1988) – British businessman and think tank founder
- Lionel Fraser (1895-1965) – British banker
- Bette Nesmith Graham (1924-1980) – inventor of Liquid Paper and mother of Mike Nesmith
- Martha Matilda Harper (1857-1950) – American businesswoman and inventor who launched modern retail franchising
- Robert Hotung (1862-1956), Businessman and philanthropist from British Hong Kong
- John Munro Longyear (1850-1922), American businessman
- Mary Beecher Longyear (1851-1931), American philanthropist and preservationist
- Ben Weingart (1888-1980) – American real estate investor and developer
- Charles Wyly (1933-2011), American businessman
- Sam Wyly, American businessman

== Arts and entertainment ==
=== Artists ===
- Hilda Carline (1889-1950) – British post-impressionist painter
- Joseph Cornell (1903-1972) – American artist and film maker (Note: Science and Health with Key to the Scriptures is said to have been very important to him and his art)
- Evelyn Dunbar (1906-1960) – English artist and muralist, employed as an official war artist during World War II
- Fougasse (1887-1965) – British cartoonist (Note: taught at the Christian Science Sunday School in Sloane Square, London, UK, for a number of years (the church there is now called Cadogan Hall))
- Mina Loy (1882-1996) – British artist, writer, poet, playwright, novelist, painter, designer of lamps, and bohemian
- Winifred Nicholson (1893-1981) – British painter
- Violet Oakley (1874-1961) – American artist known for murals and work in stained glass
- Marcellus E. Wright Sr. (1881-1962) – American architect who designed the Altria Theater

=== Authors ===
- Richard Bach – author of Jonathan Livingston Seagull (Note: Was a reader in the Christian Science Church in the early 1970s)
- Andrew Clements (1949-2019) – American author of children's books, including Frindle
- Willis Vernon Cole (1882-1939) – American poet and author, Christian Science practitioner tried for practising medicine (Note: put on trial for practicing Christian Science healing without a medical license)
- Heather Vogel Frederick – former journalist & editor, American historical fiction, fantasy, & contemporary fiction author of at least 20 books for young readers
- Sibyl Marvin Huse (1866-1939) — American author of religious books and teacher/Reader of Christian Science
- Godfrey John (d. about 2003) – Welsh poet and Christian Science teacher
- William D. McCrackan (1864-1923) – writer, author of The Rise of the Swiss Republic
- J. D. Salinger (1919-2010)– American writer best known for his novel The Catcher in the Rye (Note: joined it as well as various other faiths)
- Danielle Steel – American author

=== Entertainment figures ===
- Harold Bradley Jr. (1929-2021) - Chicago native, American painter, actor, singer and former professional football player; founder of Rome, Italy's legendary Folkstudio
- Pearl Bailey (1918-1990) – Singer
- Kenny L. Baker (1912-1985) – singer and actor (Note: wrote hymns for the faith and later became a Christian Science practitioner)
- Valerie Bergere (1867-1938)– French-born actress of stage and screen
- Elisabeth Bergner (1949- 1986) - Austrian/British actress
- Carol Channing (1921-2019) – American actress, singer, dancer, and comedian (Note: did see a Dr. Bill Cayhand in cases of more severe medical problems)
- Juanin Clay (1949-1995) – American actress with roles in WarGames and The Legend of the Lone Ranger
- Joan Crawford (190?-1977)– American film and television actress (Note: converted from Catholicism)
- Doris Day (1922-2019) – American actress, singer, and animal welfare activist (Note: there is some evidence that she saw it solely as a philosophy later in her life, not as a religion)
- Colleen Dewhurst (1924-1991) – Canadian-American actress (Note: discussed in pages 368–74 of her unfinished autobiography)
- Robert Duvall (1931-2026) – American actor (Note: raised Christian Scientist, identifies as such, but non-practicing)
- Georgia Engel (1948-2019) – American film, television, and stage actress
- Edith Evans (1888-1976) - actress
- Horton Foote (1916-2009) – playwright and screenwriter
- Kelsey Grammer – actor (Note: Raised in the faith, still considers himself a Christian Scientist even though he doesn’t subscribe to all of their beliefs.)
- Charlotte Greenwood (1890-1977) – actress and dancer
- Joyce Grenfell (1910-1979) – English comedian, singer, actress, monologist, scriptwriter and producer
- Corinne Griffith (1894-1979) – American actress, producer, author and businesswoman
- David Liebe Hart – puppeteer, actor, singer and painter
- Howard Hawks (1896-1977) – film director
- Peter Horton – actor
- Bud Jamison (1894-1944) – actor active from 1915 to 1944
- Leatrice Joy (1893-1985) – silent film star
- Val Kilmer (1959-2025) – American actor (Note: read scripture to a congregation in New Mexico)
- Matt Lauria (1982- ) -- American actor
- Eve McVeagh (1919-1997) – American actress
- Martin Melcher (1915-1968) – producer, third husband of Doris Day
- Conrad Nagel (1897-1970) – actor
- Antoinette Perry (1888-1946) – Broadway director, mentor and actress; namesake of the Tony Awards
- Mary Pickford (1892-1979) – Canadian-American actress; co-founder of the film studio United Artists; one of the original 36 founders of the Academy of Motion Picture Arts and Sciences (Note: in 1934, she published Why Not Try God?, a booklet touting Christian Science)
- Ginger Rogers (1911-1995) – American actress, dancer, and singer
- Lilia Skala (1896-1994) – Austrian-American architect and actress best known for playing the Mother Superior in Lilies of the Field (Note: converted to the faith and mentioned it often)
- Jean Stapleton (1923-2013) – actress, best known for playing Edith Bunker
- W. S. Van Dyke (1889-1943) – director of films, including The Thin Man
- King Vidor (1889-1982) – director, producer, and screenwriter who won an Academy Honorary Award
- Anna May Wong (1905-1961) – American actress, considered to be the first Chinese American Hollywood movie star (Note: also believed in reincarnation; there are disputed claims she embraced some Taoist principles)
- Alfre Woodard – actress who won awards for roles in Miss Evers' Boys, Radio, Memphis Beat
- Alan Young (1919-2016) – English–American actor (Note: founded a film and broadcast division for the Christian Science church, though he later was critical of the church as an organization)

=== Musicians ===
- Harry C. Browne (1878 -1954) – minstrel songwriter, singer, and banjo player
- Cornelius Bumpus (1945-2004) – jazz musician, member of the Doobie Bros. and Steely Dan
- Blanche Calloway (1902-1978) – bandleader; Cab Calloway's sister
- Alberta Neiswanger Hall (1870-1956) – composer of children's songs and composed musical settings for The Songs of Father Goose
- Lionel Hampton (1908-2002) – jazz musician
- Bruce Hornsby – rock musician (Note: Although he doesn't study and rarely goes to church, said in interviews it "stays with me" and is "part of my thought process.")
- Ella Jenkins (1924 -2024) -Grammy award winning American folksinger and songwriter specialized in children's music
- Kay Kyser (1905-1985) – American bandleader and radio personality, later a Christian Science practitioner and active promoter
- Everett Lee (1916-2022) – Conductor
- Michael Nesmith (1942-2021) – member of The Monkees,
- Ruth Barret Phelps (1899-1980) – theater and church organist, later organist at the Mother Church
- Sergei Prokofiev (1891-1953) – Russian Soviet composer, pianist and conductor

== Sports ==
=== Athletes/sportspeople ===
- Harold Bradley Jr. (1929-2021), Football player, actor, singer, and visual artist
- Adin Brown – U.S. association football player
- Rowland George (1905–1997), Olympic rower; oldest surviving British Olympic gold medalist upon his death.
- Haley Henderson (1984), American Ballet Dancer - worked for Royal Danish Ballet, Ballet San Jose, Ballet West (SLC)
- Nile Kinnick (1918-1943) – American college football player and Heisman Trophy winner
- Lauren McFall Gardner—Synchronized Swimming/Artistic Swimming (2004 Summer Olympics in Athens - bronze medal winner)
- Shannon Miller – American gymnast, Olympic gold medalist
- Harry Porter (1882-1965) – Olympic gold medalist high jumper
- George Sisler (1893-1973) – baseball player
- Tommy Vardell – American football player
- Aaron Goldsmith - Sports Commentator for the Seattle Mariners and Fox College Hoops

== Intellectual life ==
=== Education and academia ===
- Carobeth Laird (1895-1983), American ethnographer and linguist
- Iris Mack (1956-2022) – mathematician, first black female professor in applied mathematics at M.I.T. (Note: Interviewed in the Christian Science Sentinel shortly after being hired by M.I.T.)
- Mary Kimball Morgan (1861–1948) – American educator and the founder of Principia College, a Christian Science college
- Robert Peel (historian) (1909-1992) – historian and church worker, best known for his three-volume biography of Mary Baker Eddy
- David E. Sweet (1933–1984) – founding president of Metropolitan State University and later president of Rhode Island College
- George B. Thomas (1914–2006) - American mathematician and professor of mathematics at MIT.

=== Journalism ===
- Richard Bergenheim (1948-2008) – American journalist and editor (Note: Also served as President of the Mother Church)
- Erwin Canham (1904-1982) – editor of the Christian Science Monitor, also the last Resident Commissioner of the Northern Mariana Islands
- Kay Fanning (1927-2000) – editor of the Anchorage Daily News and Christian Science Monitor, first woman to edit an American national newspaper.
- Harold Frederic (1856-1898) – journalist and novelist
- Virginia Graham (1910–1993) – English humourist
- John Hughes (editor) – American journalist, former editor of The Christian Science Monitor and The Deseret News
- Edward J. Meeman (1889-1966) – American journalist
- Cora Rigby (1865-1930) – first woman at a major paper to head a Washington news bureau, co-founder of the Women's National Press Club.
- Marjorie Shuler (1888-1977) – suffragist, author, adventurer, publicist, journalist, longtime writer for the Christian Science Monitor. Daughter of famous suffragist Nettie Rogers Shuler.
- "Aunt Susan" born Edna Vance (1893-1972), American journalist and radio personality

=== Exploration, invention, and science ===
- Neil Kensington Adam (1891-1973) – British chemist (Note: wrote the article "A Christian Scientist's Approach to the Study of Natural Science")
- Edmund F. Burton (1862-1921) – physician who left medicine for the study of Christian Science
- Laurance Doyle – researcher at SETI
- Claribel Kendall (1889-1965) – American mathematician
- Charles Lightoller (1874-1952) – surviving Second Officer of the Titanic
- Jer Master (unknown-2010) – Indian pediatrician who abandoned medicine for the faith
- Homer E. Newell Jr. (1915-1983) – NASA administrator, mathematics professor, and author
- Alan Shepard (1923-1998) – first American to travel into space, one of the first to walk on the Moon (Note: mother and wife were Christian Scientists as well, he attended the church, but did not talk publicly about his faith.)
- Doris Huestis Speirs (1894-1989) – Canadian ornithologist, artist and poet
- John M. Tutt (1879-1966) – American medical doctor who became a teacher of Christian Science

== Other ==
- Enid de Chair (1879-1966) - First Lady of New South Wales
- John V. Dittemore (1876-1937) – trustee of Eddy estate, director of The Mother Church, then critic and co-author of Mary Baker Eddy: The Truth and the Tradition
- Calvin Frye (1845-1917) – personal assistant of Mary Baker Eddy
- Mary W. Adams (1834-1908) – in 1905 hired Frank Lloyd Wright to build house in Highland Park, Illinois
- Violet Spiller Hay (1873–1969) – Christian Science practitioner, teacher and hymnist
- Emma Curtis Hopkins (1849-1925) – Christian Science practitioner, Journal editor, later started her own college and association
- Bliss Knapp (1877-1958) – Christian Science lecturer, practitioner, teacher and author
- Annie M. Knott (1850-1941) – Christian Science practitioner, teacher and church leader
- Laura Lathrop (1845-1922) – Christian Science teacher in New York
- Augusta E. Stetson (1842-1928) – Christian Science teacher in New York, excommunicated in 1909
- Irving C. Tomlinson (1860-1944) – Universalist minister who converted to Christian Science

== Notable people raised in Christian Science ==
- E. Power Biggs (1906-1977) – Concert organist and recording artist, his mother was a Christian Scientist.
- Jonathan Carroll – American fiction writer (Note: Raised in the church by Jewish converts to it, no longer practicing.)
- Hart Crane (1899-1932) – American poet
- Christina Crawford – American author and actress (Note: mentioned in Mommie Dearest)
- Ellen DeGeneres – American comedian (father was a Christian Scientist) (Note: was not vaccinated as a child and says she felt "left out")
- Daniel Ellsberg (1931-2023) – American economist who released the Pentagon Papers (Note: his parents were Jewish converts to Christian Science, it’s unclear if he remained in the religion)
- William Everson (1912-1994) – American poet (Note: had Christian Scientist parents; became a member of the Dominican Order for 18 years)
- Stewart Farrar (1916-2000) – English writer (Note: abandoned the faith in favor of agnosticism and then Neopaganism)
- Paul Feig – American filmmaker (Note: Considers himself an atheist now, but says there are "good things" he took away from the religion.)
- Henry Fonda (1905-1982) – American actor
- Ralph Giordano (1923-2014) – German writer (Note: his parents were members of the Christian Science Church; this is mentioned in his autobiographical novel The Bertinis)
- Spalding Gray (1941-2004) – American actor and writer (Note: used his Christian Science upbringing for humor)
- Keith Green (1953-1982) – American musician
- Ernest Hemingway (1899-1961) – American writer (Note: his mother was a practicing Christian Scientist)
- Jim Henson (1936-1990)– American puppeteer (Note: in his 20s he was a Sunday School teacher in the faith, but 15 years before he died he wrote to a Christian Science church to inform them he was no longer a practicing member)
- Audrey Hepburn (1929-1993) – British actress (Note: her mother was a devout Christian Scientist, but she chose not be attached to any particular religion)
- James Hetfield – of Metallica (Note: his "The God That Failed" is one of many songs that are a response to it)
- Jack Kemp (1935-2009) – Secretary of Housing and Urban Development, member of the United States House of Representatives (Note: raised Christian Scientist, he later became a Presbyterian)
- Myles Kennedy – musician in the band Alter Bridge
- William Luce (1931-2019)– American playwright and screenwriter (Note: raised a Christian Scientist and was an organist in the Church before ultimately leaving the faith)
- Helmuth James Graf von Moltke (1907-1945) – German jurist, executed in 1945 for anti-Nazi activity (Note: his parents were active Christian Scientists who helped translate Science and Health into German, because of family tradition, Moltke decided to become confirmed in the Evangelical Church of Prussia when he was 14, but may have continued studying Christian Science)
- Marilyn Monroe (1926-1962) – American actress, model, and singer (Note: Ana Lower, who she lived with for some time, introduced her to the religion)
- V. S. Pritchett (1900-1997) – British writer and literary critic (Note: his father was a Christian Scientist and he was raised in the faith, but later was disparaging of it)
- Chris Shays – member of United States House of Representatives
- John Simpson – BBC journalist
- Julian Steward (1902-1972) – American anthropologist
- Elizabeth Taylor (1932-2011) – English-American actress (Note: raised in the faith, but converted to Judaism on marrying Eddie Fisher; remained Jewish until her death and joked of herself as "a nice little Jewish girl")
- William Thetford (1923-1988) – American professor (Note: his parents were of the faith, but left when he was seven due to the death of their daughter)
- Denton Welch (1915-1948) – English writer and artist (Note: his mother was a Christian Scientist)
- Robin Williams (1951-2014) – American actor and comedian (Note: his mother was a Christian Scientist)
- Bobby Franks (1909–1924), American murder victim of Leopold and Loeb

== See also ==
- Church of Christ, Scientist
- Manual of The Mother Church
- Demographics of the United States Congress
