= List of Christian Scientists =

Someone searching for a list of Christian Scientists might be searching for:

- List of Christians in science and technology – Which lists scientists who are also noted for their commitment to Christian thought.
- List of Christian Scientists (religious denomination) – Which lists notable members of Christian Science.
