= List of people on the postage stamps of the United Kingdom =

This is an alphabetical list of people on stamps of the United Kingdom. (The number in parentheses is the year of first appearance on a stamp.)

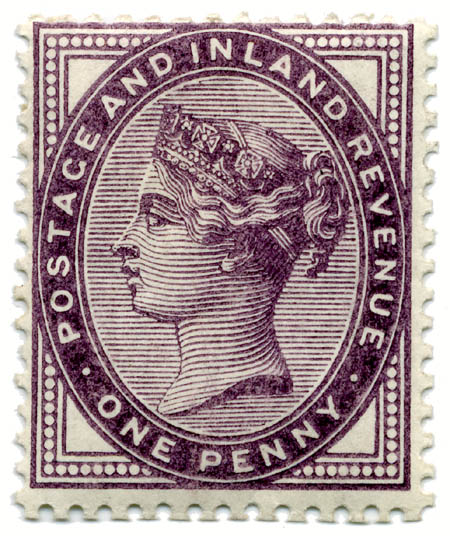
Queen Victoria on a common stamp of the 1880s.

Until 2005, the Royal Mail policy was that the only identifiable living people depicted on British stamps were the monarch and other members of the Royal Family (or people imminently marrying into it). This policy was only occasionally broken. The first exception was in the 1967 issue commemorating the solo round the world voyage of Gipsy Moth IV where a person appeared as an unidentifiable blob on the yacht – as there was only one person on board it must have been Francis Chichester. In 1968 the TUC stamp included the photos of three people, however they were not identified. Similarly in the issue honouring Freddie Mercury, drummer Roger Taylor can be seen in the background.

The rule was again broken in December 2003 when players from England's team which beat Australia in the 2003 Rugby World Cup final were shown; however, no faces appeared. The rule was finally abandoned with the release on 6 October 2005 of a set of stamps to commemorate the English cricket team's victory over Australia in the 2005 Ashes series. The four stamps clearly and deliberately depict members of the team including captain Michael Vaughan and Andrew "Freddie" Flintoff. A series of stamps released in January 2007 featured some of the most famous Beatles album covers, which also show members of the band, including Paul McCartney and Ringo Starr. Similarly, a 2011 stamp features actor David Tennant in the role of Hamlet. A series of gold medal stamps, issued during the 2012 Summer Olympics, feature British gold medal-winning athletes.

This list is complete through 1991.

== A ==
- Nicola Adams (2012)
- Ben Ainslie (2012)
- John Alcock (1969)
- Prince Andrew, Duke of York (1986)
- Queen Anne of Cleves, wife of Henry VIII (1997)
- Jessica-Jane Applegate (2012)
- John Archer (2013)

== B ==
- Charles Babbage, scientist (1991, 2010)
- Francis Bacon (2009)
- Robert Baden-Powell (1982)
- Tim Baillie (2012)
- Francis Baily (1970)
- Natasha Baker Paralympics Gold Medal Winner (2012)
- Sir John Barbirolli (1980)
- Laura Bechtolsheimer (2012)
- Sir Thomas Beecham (1980)
- Faith Bennett (2022)
- The Black Prince (1974)
- Admiral Robert Blake (1982)
- Danny Blanchflower (1996)
- Anne Boleyn, consort of Henry VIII (1997, 2024)
- Queen Elizabeth, the Queen Mother, consort of George VI (1937)
- David Bowie, musician and actor (2017)
- Robert Boyle, scientist (2010)
- Scott Brash (2012)
- Benjamin Britten (2013)
- Charlotte Brontë (1980)
- Emily Brontë (1980)
- Arthur Whitten Brown (1969)
- Danielle Brown (2012)
- Alistair Brownlee (2012)
- Steven Burke (2012)
- Robert Burns (1966, 1996, 2009)
- Sir Matt Busby (2009)
- Mickey Bushell (2012)

== C ==
- Queen Catherine of Aragon, wife of Henry VIII (1997)
- Donald Campbell (2009)
- Luke Campbell (2012)
- King Charles III (1969 as Prince of Wales, since 2023 as King)
- Charlie Chaplin (1985, 1999)
- Peter Charles (2012)
- Francis Chichester (1967, 2003)
- Sophie Christiansen (2012)
- Sir Winston Churchill (1965, 1974, 2024)
- Ed Clancy (2012)
- Hannah Cockroft (2012)
- Mark Colbourne (2012)
- Sir Arthur Conan Doyle (2009)
- Captain James Cook (2018)
- Peter Cook (1998)
- Tommy Cooper (1998)
- Katherine Copeland (2012)
- Josef Craig (2012)
- Deb Criddle (2012)
- Admiral Andrew Cunningham (1982)
- Peter Cushing, Film and Television actor (2013)

== D ==
- Charles Darwin (1982)
- Elizabeth David (2013)
- Aled Davies (2012)
- Bishop Richard Davies (1988)
- Les Dawson (1998)
- Dixie Dean (1996)
- Frederick Delius (1985)
- Richard Dimbleby (2013)
- Lord Dowding (1986)
- Sir Francis Drake (1973)
- Charlotte Dujardin (2012)

== E ==
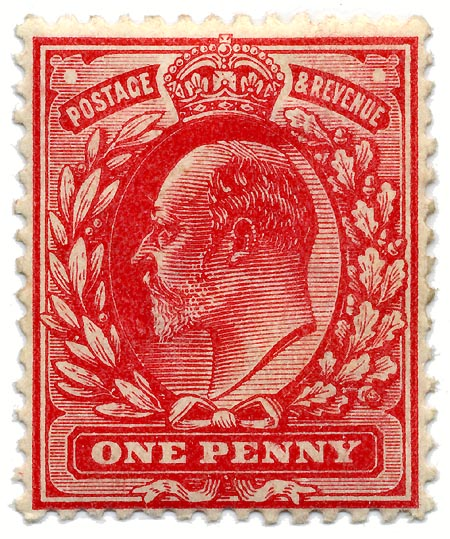
Edward VII, 1902

- King Edward VII (1902)
- King Edward VIII (1936)
- Prince Edward, Earl of Wessex (1999)
- Barbara Edwards, meteorologist (2024)
- Duncan Edwards, footballer (1996)
- Edward Elgar (1985)
- George Eliot (1980)
- Queen Elizabeth I (1968 and 21 April 2001)

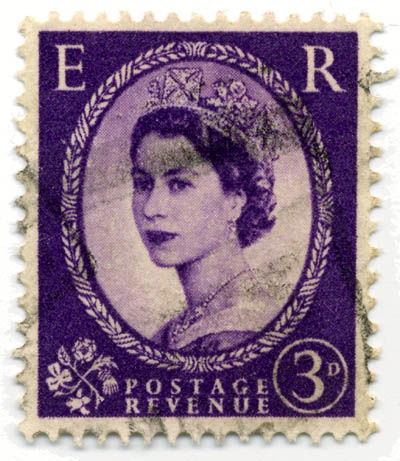
Queen Elizabeth II, 1952

- Queen Elizabeth II (1952 and the rest of her reign as Queen, 1948 as Princess Elizabeth)
- Jessica Ennis (2012)

== F ==
- Neil Fachie (2012)
- Michael Faraday (1991)
- Mo Farah (2012)
- Sarah, Duchess of York (1986)
- Admiral Jackie Fisher (1982)
- Jonathan Fox (2012)
- Benjamin Franklin (1976, 2010)
- Heather Frederiksen (2012)
- Elisabeth Frink (1996)
- Sir Martin Frobisher (1972)

== G ==
- Mohandas Gandhi (1969)
- Elizabeth Gaskell (1980)
- Saint George (1951)
- King George V (1911)

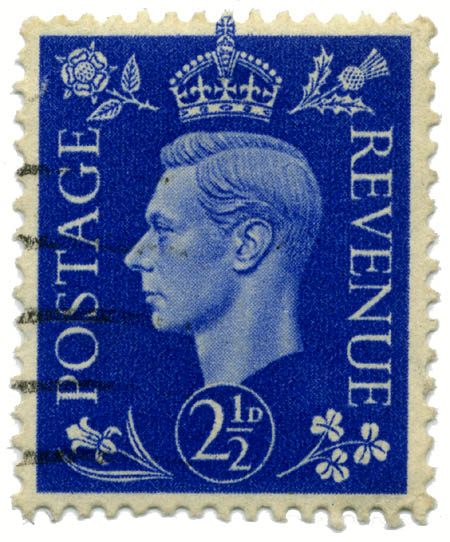
George VI, 1937

- King George VI (1937)
- Helen Glover (2012)
- Owain Glyndŵr (1974)
- King Harold Godwinson (1966)
- William Gilbert Grace (1973)
- Katherine Grainger (2012)
- Thomas Gray (1971)
- Alex Gregory (2012)
- Joyce Grenfell (1998)

== H ==
- George Frederic Handel (1985)
- Thomas Hardy (1990)
- Sir Arthur Harris (1986)
- Prince Harry (2018)
- Marea Hartman, sports administrator (1996)
- King Henry V (1964)
- King Henry VIII (1982)
- Sir John Herschel (1970)
- Sir William Herschel, astronomer (1970)
- Carl Hester (2012)
- Sir Rowland Hill, postal reformer (1979)
- Philip Hindes, (2012)
- Alfred Hitchcock, film-maker(1985)
- Dorothy Hodgkin, scientist (1996)
- Wenceslaus Hollar (1965)
- Gustav Holst, composer (1985)
- Sophie Hosking (2012)
- Queen Catherine Howard, wife of Henry VIII (1997)
- Luke Howard, amateur meteorologist (2024)
- Sir Chris Hoy (2012 twice)
- Henry Hudson, explorer (1972)
- Ollie Hynd (2012)

== J ==
- Tom James (2012)
- Edward Jenner, scientist (2010)
- Samuel Johnson (2009)
- Jade Jones (2012)
- Anthony Joshua (2012)

== K ==
- Anthony Kappes (2012)
- John Keats, poet (1971)
- Peter Kennaugh (2012)
- Jason Kenny (2012 twice)
- Alice Keppel, mistress of Edward VII, great-grandmother of Queen Camilla (1983)
- Violet Keppel (1983)
- Danielle King (2012)

== L ==
- Stan Laurel, comedian (1990)
- Mary Leakey (2013)
- Edward Lear (1988)
- Vivien Leigh (1985, 1996, 2013)
- John Lennon (1988)
- Joseph Lister (1965, 2010)
- David Livingstone (1973)
- David Lloyd George (2013)
- Helena Lucas (2012)

== M ==
- Craig MacLean (2012)
- Ben Maher (2012)
- Guglielmo Marconi, inventor (1995)
- Meghan Markle (2018)
- Ed McKeever (2012)
- Freddie Mercury, musician (1999)
- Bobby Moore, footballer (1996 & 1999)
- Rev William Morgan, Welsh Bible translator (1988)
- Sarah Barrett Moulton (Pinkie) (1968)
- Andy Murray (2012)
- Brian May (2020)

== N ==
- Alexander Nasmyth (1966)
- Admiral Horatio Nelson (1982)
- Sir Isaac Newton, scientist (2010)
- Florence Nightingale, nurse (1970)
- David Niven (1985)

== O ==
- Nelly O'Brien (4 July 1973) painting by Sir Joshua Reynolds

== P ==
- Emmeline Pankhurst (29 May 1968)
- Norman Parkinson (2013)
- Jonnie Peacock (2012)
- Josie Pearson (2012)
- Lee Pearson (2012)
- Fred Perry (2009)
- Queen Catherine Parr, wife of Henry VIII (1997)
- Bishop Richard Parry (1988)
- Victoria Pendleton (2012)
- Prince Philip, Duke of Edinburgh (1948 and 1972)
- Captain Mark Phillips (1973)
- Lord Portal (1986)

== R ==
- Sir Henry Raeburn (1973) self-portrait
- Sir Walter Raleigh (1973, 2024)
- Pete Reed (2012)
- Pamela Relph (2012)
- Sir Joshua Reynolds (1973)
- Naomi Riches (2012)
- Gus Risman (1995)
- Robert the Bruce (1974)
- James Roe (2012)
- Sir James Clark Ross (1972)
- Joanna Rowsell (2012)
- Ernest Rutherford, scientist (2010)
- Greg Rutherford (2012)

== S ==
- William Salesbury (1988)
- Sir Malcolm Sargent (1980)
- Captain Robert Falcon Scott (1972)
- Sir Walter Scott (1971)
- Peter Sellers (1985)
- Sir Nicholas Shackleton, scientist (2010)
- Queen Jane Seymour, wife of Henry VIII (1997)
- William Shakespeare (1964, 1988)
- Bill Shankly (2013)
- Ellie Simmonds (2012)
- Paul Simonon
- Simon de Montfort (1965)
- Nick Skelton (2012)
- Archibald Skirving (1966)
- David Smith (2012)
- Sophie, Countess of Wessex (1999)
- Lady Diana Spencer (1981)
- The Spice Girls (2024)
- Henry Morton Stanley (1973)
- Heather Stanning (2012)
- David Stone (2012)
- Barney Storey (2012)
- Sarah Storey (2012)
- Etienne Stott (2012)
- George Stubbs (1967)
- Charles Sturt (1973)

== T ==
- Roger Taylor Queen Drummer, June 1999.(On kit in background)
- Lord Tedder (1986)
- David Tennant (2011, 2013)
- Alfred Tennyson (1992)
- Geraint Thomas (2012)
- Lord Trenchard (1986)
- Andrew Triggs Hodge (2012)
- Laura Trott (2012 twice)

== V ==
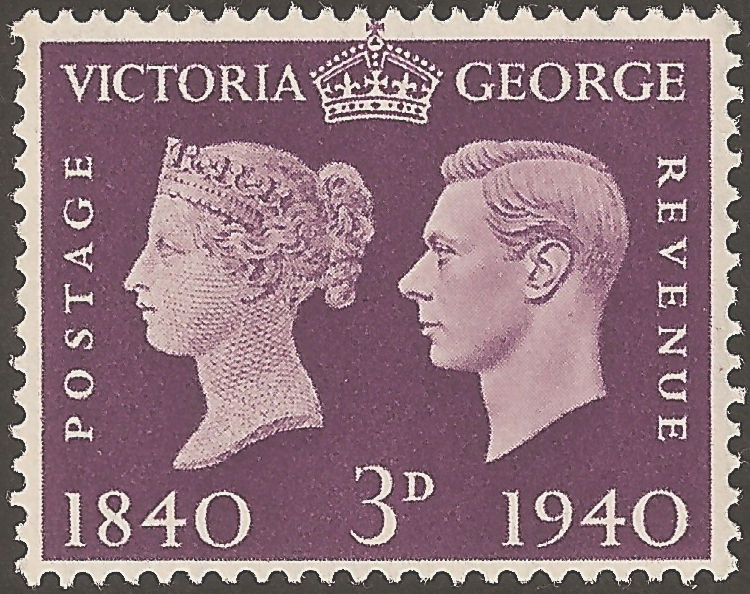
Victoria and George VI, 1940

- Lily van den Broecke (2012)
- Queen Victoria (1840 and the rest of her reign, 1940, 1970)
- Ralph Vaughan Williams (1972)

== W ==
- Harold Wagstaff
- Rev. Robert Walker The Skating Minister (1973) painting by Sir Henry Raeburn
- Alfred Russel Wallace, scientist (2010)
- Anna Watkins (2012)
- David Weir (2012)
- Sophie Wells (2012)
- King Wenceslas (Christmas 1973 (set), Christmas 1982)
- Bradley Wiggins (2012)
- Peter Wilson (2012)
- Billy Wright (1996)
- Henry Wood (1980)
- Mary Wollstonecraft (2009)

== See also ==
- List of United Kingdom commemorative stamps
- List of people on stamps of Lundy

== References and sources ==
Notes

Sources

- Stanley Gibbons catalogue
- StampNews.com
