= Audrey Fildes =

British actress (1922–1997)

Audrey Fildes (24 November 1922, Bromborough, Cheshire, England – 13 September 1997, Toronto, Ontario, Canada) was an English actress whose first film credit was the 1947 production While I Live. In 1949, she played the role of Louis Mazzini's mother, who was ostracised by her aristocratic family, in the film Kind Hearts and Coronets.

== Early life and education ==
Granddaughter of Victorian painter Luke Fildes and Welsh sculptor Goscombe John, and daughter of British Olympian (Épée) Luke Val Fildes, Audrey showed interest in acting while a student at Hayes Court School. She said that, while at Hayes Court, she was directed in a performance of The Merchant of Venice by Alec Guinness. At the performance, he brought Peggy Ashcroft backstage and introduced Audrey to her as "my Portia".

== Career ==
During her twenties she appeared as Sonia in the production of Dostoyevsky's Crime and Punishment with John Gielgud at the New Theatre in 1946, and as Diana in Jean Anouilh's Ring Round the Moon (1950), directed by Peter Brook and co-starring Paul Scofield.

In 1947 she appeared as Miss Design, opposite Joyce Grenfell's Miss Arty, in Designing Women, a short film made by the Central Office of Information for the Council for Industrial Design in an attempt to influence consumers' taste. Helping a newly-wed couple consider their motley collection of wedding gifts, she advised them to ask "Does it work? Is it genuine and well-made? Is it attractive?". An author writing about the film in 2009 described Fildes as a "beautiful starlet".

She married a Canadian design consultant in 1955, and moved to Ottawa. They had two sons before separating, following which Fildes returned to England to bring up her sons. In the early 1970s Fildes trained as a gilder and restorer at the City and Guilds of London Institute. In 1976 she returned to Canada, settling in Toronto. Her gilding and restoration clients included the Government of Ontario and pieces of her work remain at Queen's Park, the Provincial Parliament. She was a member of the William Morris Society of Canada.

The National Portrait Gallery holds a 1944 photograph of Fildes by Cecil Beaton, and the collection of Amgueddfa Cymru – Museum Wales includes a 1934 bronze bust Audrey by her grandfather Goscombe John, which may be of Fildes. She appeared as a model in the September 1950 edition of British Vogue.

== Filmography ==
| Year | Title | Role | Notes |
|---|---|---|---|
| 1947 | While I Live | Olwen | |
| 1947 | Designing Women | Miss Design | Short |
| 1949 | Kind Hearts and Coronets | Mama | |

== Television Work ==
| Television Series | Episode | Character | Year |
|---|---|---|---|
| Wednesday Theatre | A Social Success | The Countess of Amersham | 1953 |
| BBC Sunday-Night Theatre (Live Performance) | The Lake | Marjorie Hervey | 1953 |
