= Designing Women (disambiguation) =

Designing Women is an American television series.

Designing Women may also refer to:

- Designing Women (1934 film), 1934 British drama film
- Designing Women (1947 film), 1947 British short film

== See also ==
- Designing Woman, 1957 American romantic comedy film
