= Willis Vernon Cole =

American poet and author

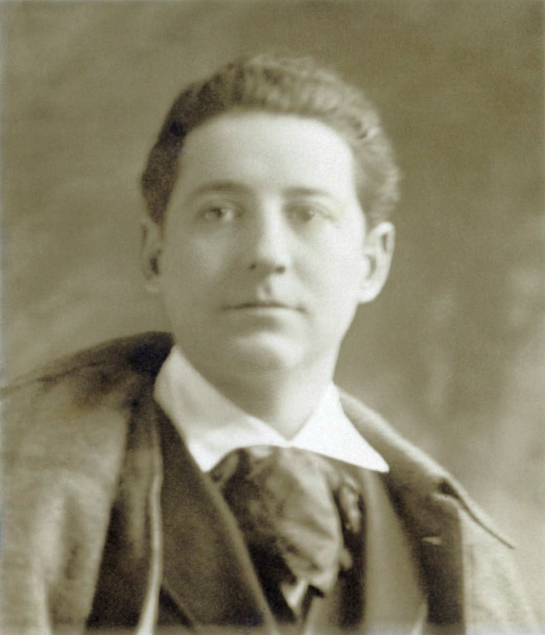
- Willis Vernon Cole, 1916
- Born: 1882; Detroit, Michigan, US
- Died: 1939 (aged 56–57); Luynes, France

Willis Vernon Cole (1882 - 1939) was an American poet and author. He produced five volumes of poetry, and four historical fiction novels, two of which were award-winning. He was noted for his anthology of World War I poems, as well. Cole also gained notoriety for being tried in the Criminal Branch of the New York Supreme Court from 1911 to 1916 for practicing medicine without a license, being found guilty, and then winning his appeal.

== Early life ==
Willis Vernon Cole was born in Detroit, Michigan, on March 3, 1882, to Willis Herbert Cole and Mary Elizabeth Stinchfield. He grew up in Detroit and attended the Art Students League of New York in New York City, where he studied sculpture and fine art. In 1903, at 20 years old, his eyesight had been failing in one eye, and in the other he began having trouble when medical doctors gave up hope on his recovery. He later reported during trial that, “God did the healing”, through Christian Science prayer treatment. Cole eventually became First Reader (conductor of services) in the Christian Science Church and then a practitioner himself, writing and producing four volumes of inspirational poetry, much of which was devoted to Christian Science.

In 1911, Cole married Agnes Young. The couple lived in Manhattan and Greenwich Village, where Cole continued his practice of Christian Science treatment and writing poetry. The Coles' circle of friends contained many notable persons of the day. Authors, playwrights, politicians, royalty, scientists, painters and military generals were among them. Cole was the official government anthologist of World War I songs and poetry, and produced and maintained his own anthology of poems about and for the Allied troops, and the battles of that war. This anthology, Songs of Armageddon, was included in his broader collection, Our Leader and the Complete Poetical Works.

== Legal issues ==
In the early part of the 20th century, the New York County Medical Society had been attempting to clarify its interpretation of the law regarding what constituted medical practice as opposed to the medical quackery of the time. Cole was working as a Christian Science practitioner from his office in New York City, and charged a small fee for his services, which according to the New York County Medical Society, put him in the category of unlicensed physician. He was arrested for practicing medicine without a license, tried, and fined $100. His case gained more importance as it became a test case to determine whether practicing Christian Science was legal or not, and Cole was represented during the trials by Samuel Untermyer and Henry D. Estabrook. In total he stood for a total of four trials, lasting five years. The trials were widely publicized, creating heated debate - and finally a permanent ruling - on what constitutes freedom of religious practice in the treatment of bodily ills. Cole won through a unanimous ruling by the New York Court of Appeals in 1916, setting the precedent which has since allowed Christian Science practice to be legal, separate and apart from medical practice. In the ruling, Chief Justice Willard Bartlett wrote: "I deny the power of the Legislature to make it a crime to treat disease by prayer."

== Later life in France ==
By 1923, Cole was divorced and had begun writing historical fiction in Greenwich Village, New York. After winning an award for his first novel, The Star of the Alamo, in 1926, he retired to France and established himself in a historic Loire chateau, Château de Cinq-Mars, near Tours, where he began making his own wines from the chateau's vineyards and developed this pursuit into a prosperous wine business, "Vins de France". He continued writing novels, winning a second award for Constanza, and in 1927 married Maria Estella Jiminez of Pasadena, California. They had three children in France. During this time, Cole was elected President of the Writers Guild of America.

Willis Vernon Cole died on March 7, 1939, in Luynes, France, shortly before the German invasion, and is buried there. His death was reported on the AP throughout the United States two days following, his obituary stating that "An American Poet Has Died". Cole's works are still widely distributed and can be found in the libraries and classrooms of such colleges as Yale University, Harvard University, Brown University, the Lincoln Presidential Library, the University of Michigan, the New York Public Library, McGill, New York University, and Brandeis.

== Publications ==
- Our Leader and Other Poems, Anglo American Authors Association, London, New York, 1907. ISBN 9781248720899
- Poems that Heal the Sick, Universal Good Publishing Society, New York, 1908. ISBN 9781286300046
- Poems, Manger, Hughes and Manger, New York, 1913. ASIN: B008WA63RE
- Our Leader: and the Complete Poetical Works, Cambridge Press, New York, 1920. ISBN 9781245804721
- Abelard and Heloise, Universal Good Publishing Company, New York, 1923. (Out of Print) ASIN: B00248WB9Y
- Cole's Complete Code for Metaphysicians, Universal Good Publishing Company, New York, 1923; extracts at religious/missions codes
- The Star of the Alamo, Writers Guild, New York, 1926. (Out of Print) ASIN: B000K0A91A
- The Princess: A Cycle of Tone Poems, Writers Guild, New York, 1927. ASIN: B000J0BBJ0
- Constanza, Writers Guild, New York, 1927. ISBN 9781258851132
- Park Avenue, Writers Guild, New York, 1928. (Out of Print) ASIN: B004M38VX4
