= A Letter from Home (film) =

1941 film

- Directed by: Carol Reed
- Produced by: Edward Black
- Starring: Joyce Grenfell
- Production company: Twentieth Century-Fox
- Distributed by: Gaumont-British
- Release date: 1941
- Running time: 17 minutes
- Country: United Kingdom
- Language: English

A Letter from Home is a 1941 British short documentary film directed by Carol Reed. The 17-minute film was nominated for an Academy Award for Best Documentary Short.

== Cast ==
- Joyce Grenfell as American Mother
- Kathleen Harrison as The Maid
- Celia Johnson as English Mother
- Edie Martin as Bespectacled shopper
