= Virginia Graham (English writer) =

English writer and poet (1910–1993)

Virginia Margaret Graham (1 November 1910 – 17 February 1993) was a London-born English writer, critic and poet, whose humorous verses on Second World War subjects were republished in London by Persephone Books in 2000 as Consider the Years 1938–1946. The first edition was published in 1946 by Jonathan Cape. She had a long correspondence with Joyce Grenfell, which was later published.

== Early life ==
Virginia Graham was the only child of the humorist and poet, Harry Graham (Ruthless Rhymes for Heartless People), and Dorothy Villiers, who married in 1910. She was a Christian Scientist. Brought up near Hyde Park, London, she attended Notting Hill High School. She married Antony Frederic Lewis Thesiger, son of Hon. Percy Thesiger, in 1939, but had no children.

== Published works ==
Graham's published books include Say Please (1949), a sardonic etiquette guide illustrated by Osbert Lancaster, Here's How (1951), A Cockney in the Country (1958), and The Story of WVS (Women's Voluntary Services, 1959), for which she worked during the war, and Nikki (1956, illustrated by Gillian Bunbury).

Graham's long correspondence with Joyce Grenfell appeared in 1997. She had met Joyce Grenfell when they were children, and they enjoyed a lifelong friendship, which included collaboration on some of Grenfell's songs. On Grenfell's first stage appearance, Virginia Graham had this to say: "She had no image to preserve, no axe to grind, no future management to impress. This total lack of 'angst' came across the footlights and engendered an atmosphere of extraordinary trust and love, so that audiences under her spell felt safe and cozy and somehow cherished."

Among the works Virginia Graham translated are I Said to my Wife by the French journalist and writer Jean Duché (1953, illustrated by Nicolas Bentley) and The Sky and the Stars by Albert Préjean (1956). She was instrumental in having her father's Ruthless Rhymes republished in 1986. She also helped to compile a selection of her father's poetry published in the same year: When Grandmama Fell off the Boat.

Virginia Graham wrote regular film reviews for The Spectator in the late 1940s and early 1950s.
