= Designing Women (1947 film) =

1947 British short film

- Directed by: Roger MacDougall
- Written by: Roger MacDougall
- Story by: Stephen Potter; Joyce Grenfell
- Starring: Joy Shelton; Harry Geldard; Audrey Fildes
- Cinematography: William Luff
- Edited by: Arthur Hatherell
- Music by: Francis Chagrin
- Production company: Merlin Films Co.
- Release date: 1947
- Running time: 23 minutes
- Country: United Kingdom
- Language: English

Designing Women is a 1947 British short film produced by the Central Office of Information for the Council for Industrial Design. It was written and directed by Roger MacDougall from a story by Stephen Potter and Joyce Grenfell, and starring Grenfell, Audrey Fildes, Harry Geldard and Joy Shelton.

The film was part of a project in which the Council for Industrial Design hoped to reach and influence consumers through film and television.

== Plot ==
A newly-wed couple unpack their collection of wedding presents, and are visited by two "toga-clad goddesses": Miss Arty whose visiting card describes her as "assistant in helping you know what she likes" and Miss Design, "assistant in helping you know what you like". The quartet discuss various gifts ("Why should a heater look like a peacock?") and Miss Design produces a set of questions for consideration of any object: "Does it work? Is it genuine and well-made? Is it attractive?"

== Cast ==
- Joy Shelton as Anna
- Harry Geldard as Tom
- Audrey Fildes as Miss Design
- Joyce Grenfell as Miss Arty
