= Walton Hubbard =

American physician

Walton Hubbard (October 25, 1874 – November 9, 1954) was a medical doctor who, after nine years of medical practice, quit medicine and became a Christian Science practitioner, teacher, and lecturer.

== Life ==
Hubbard was born in Manitowoc, Wisconsin, one of four children, to Harvey F. and Anna H. Hubbard (née Warbasse), a schoolteacher. His father was seven years old when his family moved to Manitowoc, Wisconsin, becoming one of the first pioneer families there. Both of his parents were active in the Presbyterian church, interested in public affairs and social work. He graduated school and started his medical practice in 1901.

Hubbard had a successful medical practice for about four years before becoming interested in Christian Science while studying Science and Health with Key to the Scriptures by Mary Baker Eddy. He had been interested in studying the possible mental causes of some diseases, but found Eddy's theory entirely different than any other because, as he put it, "Christian Science does not depend on any power inherent in the human mind, but draws all of its power from a divine source above the human mind." He did not immediately quit his medical practice however, continuing it for another five years, and wrote that he was alarmed when he saw healings through prayer. Eventually he accepted Christian Science after his own son recovered from diphtheria under Christian Science treatment, calling it "incomparably better" than medical treatment. In 1910, he joined The Mother Church, as well as a branch church in Spokane, Washington; and the same year took class instruction in Christian Science, followed three years later by another class taught by Laura Sargent, which allowed him to teach others.

Starting in 1916, Hubbard lectured on Christian Science in the United States, Europe, and Australasia. For some time he was based out of Spokane along with a fellow medical doctor turned Christian Science practitioner, Dr. Abraham A. Sulcer. Later he lived in Los Angeles, California, where he was involved in forming the Broadview Christian Science nursing facility. For a number of years, Hubbard was one of at least two former medical doctors lecturing on Christian Science, along with Dr. John M. Tutt. He retired from the lecture circuit in 1926, then returned to lecturing again from 1937 to 1940. He read the report of the Trustees of the Charitable Institutions at The Mother Church's Annual Meeting in 1951, and also spoke at the next year's meeting. He also served as First Reader in his Los Angeles church, and read over the radio on the "Columbia West Coast Church of the Air" series.

Hubbard married his wife, Maude Chase Hubbard, on Nov. 23, 1898, who was also born in Wisconsin. They had one son together named Walton Hubbard Jr. Hubbard Jr. was a ship broker and yacht racer who won the International Star Championship in 1927, and was President of Hubbard's South Coast Company, with Hubbard Sr. serving as one of two Vice Presidents. During World War II, Hubbard's South Coast Company built minesweepers and crash boats for the United States Navy. Hubbard Sr. later remarried to Doris M. Long.

== Selected writings ==
- "God's Saving Nearness", The Christian Science Journal (August 1951)
- "Our Divine Inheritance", Christian Science Sentinel (October 20, 1951)
- "The Crucifixion and the Resurrection", Christian Science Sentinel (November 14, 1953)

== See also ==
- Edmund F. Burton
- Jer Master
