= Heather Jenner =

English matchmaker (1914–1991)

- Born: Heather Lyon; 1914
- Died: 1991 (aged 76–77)
- Occupation: Matchmaker
- Known for: Founder of The Marriage Bureau
- Spouses: Michael George Cox (m. 1942; div. 1955); Stephen Potter (m. 1955; died 1969); Sir John Hastings James

Heather Jenner (real name Heather Lyon; 1914 – 1991) was an English matchmaker, who ran a marriage bureau, called "The Marriage Bureau", in Bond Street, Mayfair, London.

== Biography ==
The daughter of Cyril Arthur Lyon, an Army general, she married, first, in 1942, Michael George Cox, from whom she was divorced in 1955 to marry the writer Stephen Potter. Widowed in 1969, she later married Sir John Hastings James, deputy master and Comptroller of the Royal Mint.

She established the agency called "The Marriage Bureau" in 1939, and kept the business secret from her family and friends, using the name "Heather Jenner", as such activity was considered scandalous at the time.

Her autobiography, Marriage is My Business, was published in 1954.

She appeared as a castaway on the BBC Radio programme Desert Island Discs on 31 July 1967.

== Bibliography ==
- —— (1953). Un mariage par jour. Pierre Horay. (in French)
- —— (1954). Marriage is My Business. Kimber.
- —— (1964). The Marriage Book. Gerald Duckworth & Co Ltd.
- —— (1967). Royal Wives. Gerald Duckworth & Co Ltd. ISBN 978-0715602881.
- ——; Segal, Muriel (1970). Men and Marriage. Michael Joseph. ISBN 978-0718103675.
- —— (1979). Marriages are Made in Heaven. David & Charles. ISBN 978-0715376621.
