= Portrait of Nelly O'Brien =

Painting by Joshua Reynolds

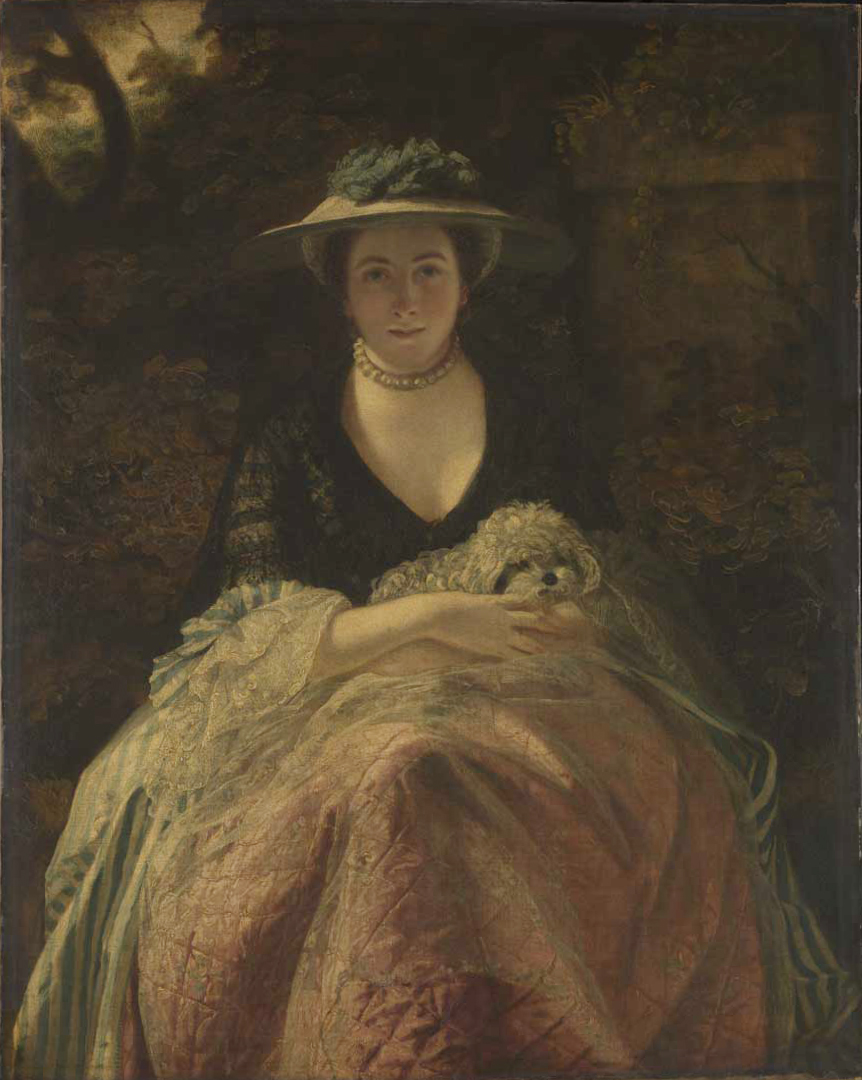
- Artist: Joshua Reynolds
- Year: c.1762
- Type: Oil on canvas, portrait painting
- Dimensions: 126.3 cm × 101 cm (49.7 in × 40 in)
- Location: Wallace Collection; London

Portrait of Nelly O'Brien is a c.1762 portrait painting by the British artist Joshua Reynolds. It depicts the well-known London courtesan Nelly O'Brien. A friend of Reynolds, she sat for him a number of times between 1760 and 1767. She was the mistress of several aristocrats before her early death in 1768.

Reynolds displayed a painting of O'Neill at the Exhibition of 1762 held by the Society of Artists in Spring Gardens, which may be either this or another portrait of her now in the Hunterian in Glasgow.

O'Brien is shown in fashionable mid-century dress with a Leghorn bonnet holding a Maltese lapdog. The painting is now in the Wallace Collection in Manchester Square, having been acquired by the Marquess of Hertford in 1810.

== Bibliography ==
- McIntyre, Ian. Joshua Reynolds: The Life and Times of the First President of the Royal Academy. Allen Lane, 2003.
