= Joyce Grenfell =

English comedian, singer and scriptwriter (1910–1979)

Joyce Grenfell OBE
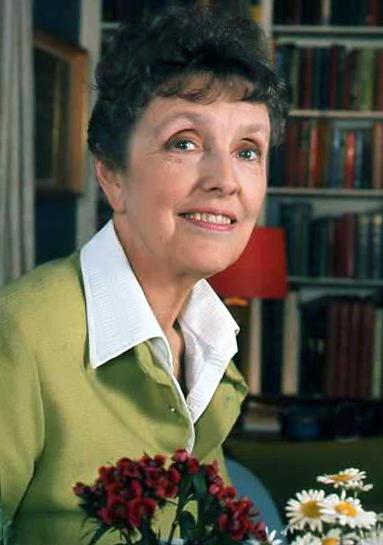
- Grenfell, by Allan Warren, 1972
- Born: Joyce Irene Phipps; 10 February 1910; Knightsbridge, London, England
- Died: 30 November 1979 (aged 69); Chelsea, London, England
- Occupations: Actress; diseuse; singer; writer
- Years active: 1939–1979
- Spouse: Reggie Grenfell (m. 1929)
- Relatives: Charles Paul Phipps (great-grandfather); Chiswell Langhorne (maternal grandfather); Nancy Astor (maternal aunt); Ruth Draper (cousin)

Joyce Irene Grenfell (née Phipps; 10 February 1910 – 30 November 1979) was an English diseuse, singer, actress and writer. She was known for the songs and monologues she wrote and performed, at first in revues and later in her solo shows. She never appeared as a stage actress, but had roles, mostly comic, in many films, including Miss Gossage in The Happiest Days of Your Life (1950) and Police Sergeant Ruby Gates in the St Trinian's series (from 1954). She was a well-known broadcaster on radio and television. As a writer, she was the first radio critic for The Observer, contributed to Punch and published two volumes of memoirs.

Born to an affluent Anglo-American family, Grenfell had abandoned early hopes of becoming an actress until she was invited to perform a comic monologue in a West End revue in 1939. Its success led to a career as an entertainer, giving her creations in theatres in five continents between 1940 and 1969.

== Life and career ==
=== Early years ===
Born in Montpelier Square, Knightsbridge, London, Grenfell was the daughter of an American socialite, Nora Langhorne, one of five daughters of Chiswell Langhorne, (an American railway millionaire), and of the architect Paul Phipps, the grandson of Charles Paul Phipps and a second cousin of the diseuse Ruth Draper, in whose professional footsteps she followed. The Phipps family were wealthy clothiers, whose success allowed them to join the gentry of their native Wiltshire. Nancy Astor was one of her maternal aunts; Grenfell often visited her at the Astors’ home of Cliveden and lived in a cottage on the estate, a mile from the main house, in the early years of her marriage.

Joyce Phipps had an upper middle-class London childhood. Among her friends was Virginia Graham, with whom she kept up a lifelong correspondence, and who wrote Grenfell's biography in the Oxford Dictionary of National Biography. Grenfell attended the Francis Holland School in central London, and the Claremont Fan Court School, in Esher, Surrey. She then went to a finishing school in Paris at the age of 17. After this she enrolled at the Royal Academy of Dramatic Art in London, but found the hard work of learning the craft of acting less glamorous than she had imagined and left after a single term. She supposed at the time that this "was the finish of my dreams of becoming an actress". On 23 May 1928 she was presented as a débutante at Buckingham Palace.

In 1927 she had met Reginald Pascoe Grenfell (1903–1993), a mining executive and later a lieutenant-colonel in the King's Royal Rifle Corps. (Note: Reggie Grenfell was a maternal grandson of the 4th Earl Grey, ninth Governor General of Canada, and great-nephew of the soldier and Governor of Malta Field Marshal Francis Wallace Grenfell, 1st Baron Grenfell.) They were married two years later, on 12 December 1929 at St Margaret's, Westminster, and remained together until her death nearly 50 years later. They were a devoted couple: Reggie Grenfell looked after his wife's financial and business affairs, and his encouragement gave her strong support. After she became a celebrity she unobtrusively made sure that he was never seen as a mere adjunct to her. They were unable to have children of their own.

=== Early career ===
In the late 1930s Grenfell contributed verses to Punch and helped to entertain her aunt's guests at Cliveden. After one lunch, J. L. Garvin, the editor of The Observer, engaged her as the paper's first radio critic. At an informal supper given by the BBC producer Stephen Potter in January 1939, she agreed to his request to entertain her fellow guests with a monologue of her own devising. This was "Useful and Acceptable Gifts", in which she played a gauche lecturer at a meeting of the Women's Institute. The impresario Herbert Farjeon was among the guests and he invited her to perform the piece in his forthcoming revue at the Little Theatre, London. She was an immediate success, winning glowing notices. The Stage judged her "outstanding ... this clever diseuse successfully catches the naif manner of an amateur speaker lecturing on 'useful and acceptable gifts', and gives us a neat and satirical impersonation of an American mother listening to her small daughter reciting Shelley's 'Ode to a Skylark'". The Tatler found her two monologues "quite the best items in the programme". The Sketch devoted a full page to photographs of her in her different characters. The Bystander thought that Grenfell challenged the celebrated Ruth Draper "on her own pitch ... carry[ing] off the acting honours of this gay and intelligent entertainment."

During the Second World War Grenfell wrote for and appeared in three more West End revues: Diversion and Diversion No. 2 at Wyndham's Theatre in 1940 and 1941, and Light and Shade at the Ambassadors in 1942. In early 1942 she met the composer Richard Addinsell. Together they wrote many successful songs including "I'm Going to See You Today" and "Turn Back the Clock", which, in the words of the biographer Janie Hampton, "aptly caught the public mood".

In 1941 Grenfell appeared in her first film role, as the American mother in Carol Reed's short documentary A Letter from Home. She made three more films during the war. For BBC radio, together with Potter, she wrote and starred in an occasional radio series called How to …, which ran intermittently from 1943 until 1962 offering humorous advice on how (and how not) to do things. (Note: The How to series covered how to – among other things – talk to children (from which Grenfell's later Nursery School sketches grew), give a party, keep a diary, woo, blow your own trumpet, be good at music, make friends, deal with Christmas, move house, listen, appreciate Shakespeare, be good at games (drawing on Potter's 1947 book Gamesmanship), broadcast, lead a really full life, cross the Atlantic first class, and know America really well.) In 1943 she made her only attempt at acting in a stage play: she resigned from the cast of a West End production of the American comedy Junior Miss after the first three days of rehearsal, finding that onstage she could only perform looking straight at an audience, and could not "act sideways", although she found some film acting roles "fun to do".

In the later years of the war Grenfell toured in the UK for ENSA, sometimes with Addinsell accompanying her at the piano. In late 1943 the head of ENSA, Basil Dean, invited the two to tour troop camps and hospitals in North Africa, the Middle East and elsewhere. Addinsell's health was too fragile to permit him to accept, and Grenfell recruited Viola Tunnard, later better known as a close colleague of Benjamin Britten. In 1944 and 1945 they performed in Algeria, Malta, Sicily, Italy, Iran, Iraq, India and Egypt.

=== Post-war work ===
Back in London Grenfell wrote the song "Du Maurier" (music by Addinsell) and the monologue "Travelling Broadens the Mind", both of which she performed in Noël Coward's first post-war revue, Sigh No More (1945). Coward had been a family friend since Grenfell was a girl. At first he had viewed her transition from amateur to professional with some doubt. Within a few years he had come to recognise her professionalism, her skill as a performer ("good in all she does on the stage") and the quality of her monologues, even if "she shouldn't write lyrics." In addition to her own two numbers, she sang Coward's comic catalogue of domestic disasters "That is the End of the News", "disguised as a schoolgirl with pigtails, all my make-up off, a shiny face and a terrible grin."

After the 1947 revue Tuppence Coloured, Grenfell developed new sketches including the first of her six Nursery School monologues, with the harassed teacher's recurring cry to one of her unseen charges, "George – don't do that...." In the 1951 revue Penny Plain she performed her "Joyful Noise" (music by Donald Swann), a parody of an amateur choir ("And some of us cannot sing much, And some can't sing at all, But how we love our outings to the Royal Albert Hall"). After this, Grenfell and Tunnard made another tour entertaining British troops in North Africa.

Joyce Grenfell Requests the Pleasure (1954) was her first more or less solo West End show (there were three dancers providing interludes between Grenfell's numbers). The Stage commented that any doubts that Grenfell could sustain a solo evening were quickly dispelled:

Miss Grenfell satirises, gently but inevitably, 20 different women, including the earnest but misguided devotee of health through rhythm, the arty curiosity-shop owner, the offhand sales-girl, the mercenary writer of children's stories (a gem, this!), the Victorian hostess whose husband had left her, the humourless American discoverer of folk songs of many lands, the shrinking but eager girl at the local palais, the incompetent but ardent Scottish dancer, the modern miss, and the Swedish visitor at a cocktail party.

After two provincial tours and a year in London she took the show to Broadway, where it had a sell-out eight-week run. For this show there was a pit band of eight players directed by William Blezard. In later shows Grenfell simplified the format further, dispensing with dancers and band, and being accompanied only by Blezard at the piano.

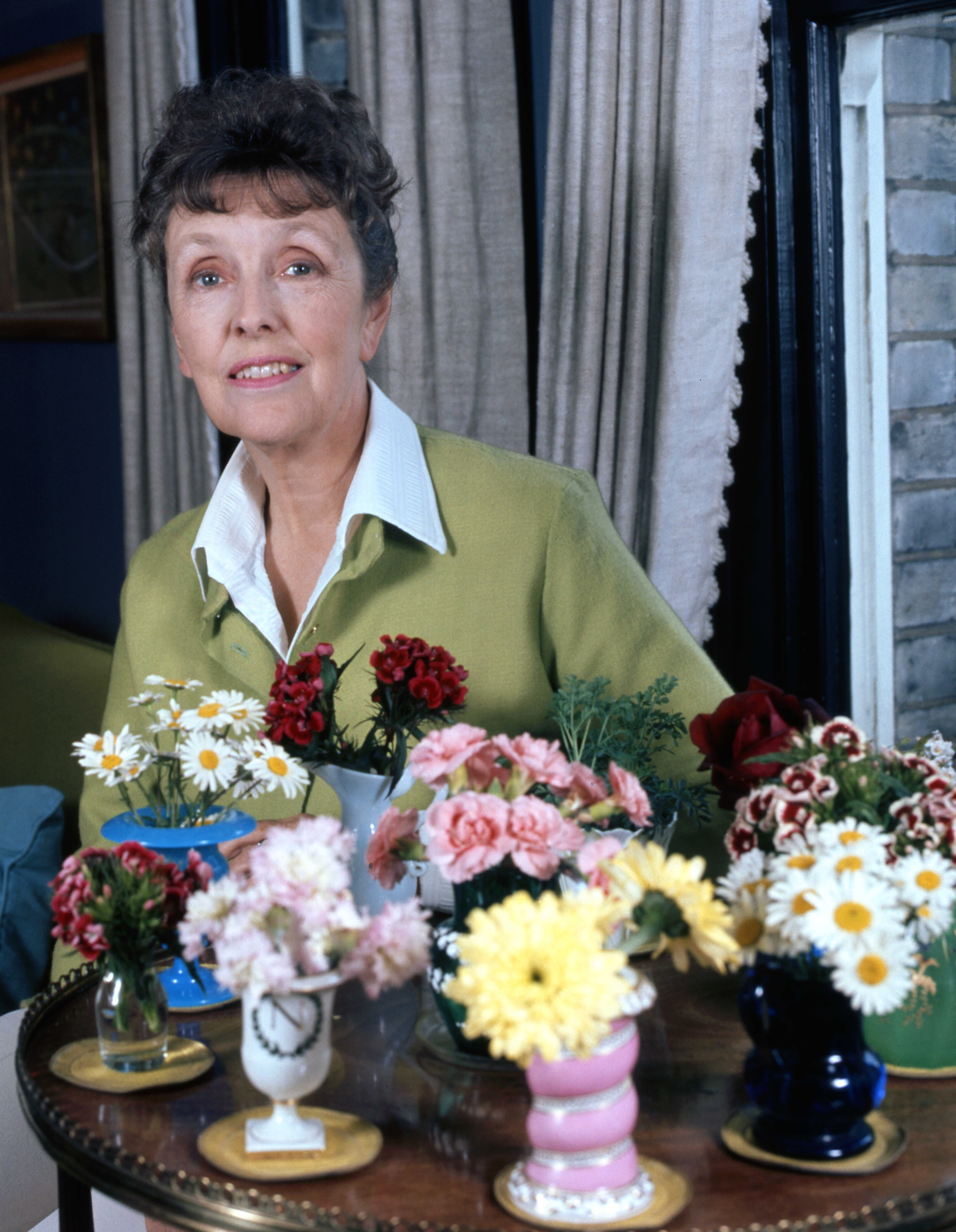
Grenfell by Allan Warren, 1972

During the 1950s and 1960s Grenfell appeared in several film roles including "Lovely Ducks", the shooting gallery attendant in Stage Fright (1950), Miss Gossage in The Happiest Days of Your Life (1950), Police Sergeant Ruby Gates in the St Trinian's series, Mrs Barham in The Americanization of Emily and Hortense Astor in The Yellow Rolls-Royce. Away from the theatre, Grenfell served as a member of the influential Pilkington Committee on Broadcasting from 1960 to 1962, and was president of the Society of Women Broadcasters and Writers.

The rest of Grenfell's stage career was in a series of solo shows in London and on tour. Between 1957 and 1970 she gave her show Joyce Grenfell in Australia, Canada, Hong Kong, New Zealand, Singapore, Switzerland and the United States, as well as around Britain and in the West End. Her last live performance was at Windsor Castle for the Queen's Waterloo Dinner in 1973.

=== Last years and legacy ===
Soon after the Windsor Castle show Grenfell was taken ill with an eye condition, which was subsequently diagnosed as cancer. As a convinced Christian Scientist (like her aunt Nancy), she was averse to doctors and hospitals. Her husband did not share her beliefs and prevailed on her to undergo treatment. The eye had to be removed and replaced with an artificial one. After this Grenfell did not return to the stage, but gave talks for charitable organisations and appeared frequently on the BBC television programme Face the Music.

In October 1979 she became seriously ill and died a month later, on 30 November 1979, just before her golden wedding anniversary. She was cremated at Golders Green Crematorium on 4 December and her ashes scattered there. On 7 February 1980 a memorial service was held at Westminster Abbey.

Grenfell was appointed an Officer of the Order of the British Empire (OBE) in 1946 for her war work. It was confirmed after her death that she was to have been made a Dame Commander (DBE) in the 1980 New Year Honours List. In 1998, the Royal Mail memorialised Grenfell with her image on a postage stamp as part of a series of stamps celebrating five comedians, drawn by Gerald Scarfe. (Note: The other four were Eric Morecambe, Tommy Cooper, Les Dawson and Peter Cook.)

Grenfell's widower, Reggie Grenfell, died at their home at 34 Elm Park Gardens, Chelsea, London, on 31 March 1993, aged 89. A blue plaque is on the wall stating that Joyce Grenfell lived in Flat 8 from 1957 to 1979.

In 2002 her friend Janie Hampton published a biography, Joyce Grenfell. Maureen Lipman toured with the one-woman show Re: Joyce!, which she co-wrote with James Roose-Evans. In it she recreates some of Grenfell's best-known sketches. Lipman also presented the radio programme Choice Grenfell, compiled from Grenfell's writings. Roose-Evans also edited Darling Ma, a 1997 collection of Grenfell's letters to her mother.

== Stage performances ==
- The Little Revue – Little Theatre, London (1939–40)
- Diversion – Wyndham's Theatre, London (1940–41)
- Light and Shade – Ambassador's Theatre, London (1942)
- ENSA tours of UK (1942)
- ENSA tour of North Africa with Viola Tunnard (1944)
- ENSA tour of the Middle East and India with Viola Tunnard (1944–45)
- Sigh No More – Piccadilly Theatre, London (1945–46)
- Tuppence Coloured – UK tour, followed by Lyric Theatre, Hammersmith and Globe Theatre, London (1947–48)
- Penny Plain – St Martin's Theatre, London and UK tour (1951–52)
- Six-week tour for British troops in Libya and Egypt with Viola Tunnard (1952)
- Joyce Grenfell Requests the Pleasure – UK tour, then Fortune Theatre and St Martin's Theatre, London, then another UK tour (1954–55)
- Joyce Grenfell Requests the Pleasure – Bijou Theatre, New York City (1955)
- Joyce Grenfell at Home – tour of Canada, Washington DC and Lyceum Theatre, New York City, with George Bauer (1956)
- Tour of Northern Rhodesia with Viola Tunnard (1956)
- Joyce Grenfell at Home – tour of Dublin and the UK, then Lyric Theatre, Hammersmith (1957)
- Joyce Grenfell Bids You Good Evening – tour of North America, with George Bauer (1958)
- Meet Joyce Grenfell – Philip Street Theatre, Sydney, with William Blezard (1959)
- Meet Joyce Grenfell – tour of UK with William Blezard (1960)
- Joyce Grenfell – Haymarket Theatre, London, followed by UK tour with William Blezard (1962)
- Joyce Grenfell – tour of Australia with William Blezard (1963)
- Tours of Canada, Switzerland and Hong Kong with William Blezard (1964)
- Tours of UK, Australia and New Zealand with William Blezard (1966)
- Tours of UK, Hong Kong, US and Canada with William Blezard (1967)
- Tour of UK with William Blezard (1968)
- Tour of Australia and New Zealand with William Blezard (1969)
- Tours of UK and US with William Blezard (1970)
- Tour of UK with William Blezard (1972)
- Waterloo Dinner, Windsor Castle (1973)

== Film performances ==
Year	Title	Role	Notes
1941	A Letter from Home	American Mother	Short
1943	The Demi-Paradise	Sybil Paulson	
1943	The Lamp Still Burns	Dr. Barrett	
1947	While the Sun Shines	Daphne	
1947	Designing Women	Miss Arty	Short
1949	Alice in Wonderland	Ugly Duchess / Dormouse	
1949	Poet's Pub	Miss Horsefell-Hughes	
1949	Tuppence Coloured		TV movie
1949	A Run for Your Money	Mrs. Pargiet	
1950	Stage Fright	'Lovely Ducks'	
1950	The Happiest Days of Your Life	Miss Gossage	
1951	The Galloping Major	Maggie the Waitress	
1951	Laughter in Paradise	Elizabeth Robson	
1951	The Magic Box	Mrs. Claire	
1952	Penny Plain		TV movie
1952	The Pickwick Papers	Mrs. Leo Hunter	
1953	Genevieve	Hotel Proprietress	
1953	The Million Pound Note	Duchess of Cromarty	
1954	Forbidden Cargo	Lady Flavia Queensway	
1954	The Belles of St. Trinian's	P.W. Sgt. Ruby Gates	
1957	The Good Companions	Lady Parlitt	
1957	Blue Murder at St Trinian's	Sergeant Ruby Gates	
1958	Happy Is the Bride	Aunt Florence	
1960	The Pure Hell of St Trinian's	Sergeant Ruby Gates	
1963	The Old Dark House	Agatha Femm	
1964	The Americanization of Emily	Mrs. Barham	
1964	The Yellow Rolls-Royce	Hortense Astor	

== Publications ==
- Joyce Grenfell Requests the Pleasure. London: Macmillan. 1976. ISBN 0-333-19428-4.
- George, Don't Do That. London: Macmillan. 1977. ISBN 0-333-22080-3.
- Stately as a Galleon and other Songs and Sketches. London: Macmillan. 1978. ISBN 0-333-25455-4.
- In Pleasant Places. London: Macmillan. 1979. ISBN 0-333-27288-9.
- James Roose-Evans, ed. (1988). Darling Ma. London: Hodder & Stoughton. ISBN 0-340-42368-4.
- James Roose-Evans, ed. (1989). The Time of My Life: Entertaining the Troops: Her Wartime Journals. London: Hodder & Stoughton. ISBN 0-340-50283-5.
- Janie Hampton, ed. (2000). Hats Off: Poems and Drawings. London: John Murray. ISBN 0-7195-6152-3.

== Notes, references and sources ==
=== Sources ===
- Castle, Charles (1972). Noël. London: W H Allen. ISBN 978-0-491-00534-0.
- Coward, Noël (1982). Graham Payn; Sheridan Morley (eds.). The Noël Coward Diaries (1941–1969). London: Methuen. ISBN 978-0-297-78142-4.
- Fox, James (1998). The Langhorne Sisters. London: Granta Books. ISBN 978-1-862-07071-4.
- Grenfell, Joyce (1976). Joyce Grenfell Requests the Pleasure. London: Macdonald Futura. ISBN 978-0-86007-571-4.
- Grenfell, Joyce (1984). Turn Back the Clock. London: Futura. ISBN 978-0-7088-2602-7.
- Hampton, Janie (2002). Joyce Grenfell. London: John Murray. ISBN 978-0-7195-6143-6.
- Hampton, Janie (2003). "Joyce Grenfell". In Annabelle Merullo; Neil Wenborn (eds.). British Comedy Greats. London: Cassell. ISBN 978-1-84403-055-2.
- Herbert, Ian, ed. (1972). Who's Who in the Theatre (fifteenth ed.). London: Sir Isaac Pitman and Sons. ISBN 978-0-273-31528-5.
- Colin Larkin, ed. (2002). The Virgin Encyclopedia of Fifties Music (third ed.). Virgin Books. ISBN 978-1-85227-937-0.
- Lyttelton, George; Rupert Hart-Davis (1979). Rupert Hart-Davis (ed.). The Lyttelton–Hart-Davis Letters, Volume 2. London: John Murray. ISBN 978-0-7195-3673-1.
- Mander, Raymond; Joe Mitchenson (2000) [1957]. Barry Day; Sheridan Morley (eds.). Theatrical Companion to Coward (second ed.). London: Oberon. ISBN 978-1-84002-054-0.
