= Jer Master =

Indian pediatrician

Jer Master was an Indian pediatrician who left medicine to pursue the study of Christian Science. For more than two decades, Master worked in the field of medicine, both in private practice and as a professor of pediatrics at the Bai Jerbai Wadia Hospital for Children in Mumbai, India. Several years after becoming introduced to Christian Science, she resigned her position at the hospital. Master eventually became a practitioner and later, a teacher of Christian Science.

== Career ==
Master was raised and educated in Mumbai. In addition to a private practice specializing in pediatric cardiology, she was affiliated with the Bai Jerbai Wadia Hospital for Children in Bombay, India, where she was a professor of pediatrics.

Around 1969, a neighbor gave her a few copies of the Christian Science Sentinel, which she accepted "to be polite". Master said, "I quickly realized this was not the usual kind of missionary literature; its logic and clarity set it apart." At that point, she bought a copy of Science and Health, the textbook of Christian Science, but she continued her medical work. Over time, her views changed. Master said that in addition, a return to Cornell University Medical Center in New York, where she had done postdoctoral research proved pivotal. Finding herself recognizing some of the young patients from more than a decade earlier, (with her notes still in their files), she found their lives sad and the state of medicine to be "so futile". Master said she was cured of bouts of severe migraine headaches after reading the first chapter of Science and Health.

In 1976, after 25 years, she resigned her position at the hospital and quit her medical practice. She had "primary class instruction" in Christian Science. Master became a practitioner and later, a teacher of Christian Science. Asked in a 1980 interview to describe the differences between medicine and Christian Science, she replied, "First, medical theories change from year to year. Books written ten years ago are almost outdated now. There's not a fixed law on which such theories are based, whereas Christian Science is based on fixed Principle, God." Master continued, "And not only do medical treatments and concepts vary from year to year, but from one part of the world to another." Master also mentioned the often dangerous side effects of various drugs and medicines, as well as Iatrogenesis. According to Master, in Christian Science treatment, effects are "only beneficial". She continued her work in Christian Science until her death in 2010.

== Published writings (partial list) ==
- Jer Master, M.D.; Mary Allen Engle, M.D.; Gertrude Stern, M.D.; Carl H. Smith, M.D. "Cardiac complications of chronic, severe, refractory anemia with hemochromatosis" The Journal of Pediatrics, Volume 58, Issue 4, pp. 455–463 (April 1961)
- Jer Master, C.S.B., "Your children are in God's care" Christian Science Journal (March 1994). Adapted from a lecture given on 21 November 1993. Retrieved 18 June 2013
- Jer Master, "A Cure for Every Ill" The Christian Science Journal (April 2006). Retrieved 16 June 2013.
- Jer Master, "Spiritual Immunity" Christian Science Sentinel (2 January 2006). Retrieved 17 June 2013

== See also ==
- Edmund F. Burton
- Walton Hubbard
- John M. Tutt
