= John M. Tutt =

Christian Science practitioner and teacher

- Born: March 20, 1879
- Died: March 1, 1966 (aged 86)
- Occupations: Medical doctor (1900-1905); CS practitioner (1912-1966)

John M. Tutt (March 20, 1879 – March 1, 1966) was an American physician who converted to Christian Science in 1905, later becoming a practitioner in 1912, and then a teacher of Christian Science in 1916. One of his early patients was the mother of film actress Ginger Rogers.

== Life ==
Tutt was born in Missouri, the youngest of seven children. His father was a Baptist minister. Tutt received a B.A. degree from William Jewell College in Liberty, Missouri and in 1900, his medical degree from University Medical College of Kansas City (University of Kansas School of Medicine) when he was only 19.

In 1905, Tutt was healed in Christian Science of a stomach ailment, issues with his eyesight, smoking, drinking, and gambling which he compared to "the old story over again of the prodigal son and his awakening." He took a Christian Science primary class from Adam H. Dickey in 1912. He has been called the best known convert to Christian Science to come from medicine. Tutt became a practitioner in 1912 and a teacher of Christian Science in 1916. From 1915 to 1918, he was the Committee on Publication for the state of Missouri. (Note: The word "committee" is used here in the archaic sense of "a person to whom a charge or trust is committed" and so refers to a single individual, not a group.)

One of Tutt's early cases as a practitioner was that of a kidnapped toddler in Kansas City. The little girl, Virginia McMath, later became known as Ginger Rogers, a Hollywood actress. Tutt became a Christian Science lecturer in 1918, continuing for the next 30 years. He taught the 1943 Normal class in the Christian Science Board of Education, which trains new teachers of Christian Science. The class is held just once every three years and is limited to 30 students. The 1940 United States census records him as having worked 52 weeks during the previous year. He continued teaching primary classes through 1965.

Tutt and his wife Alice had a son, Robert T. Tutt.

== Published writings (partial list) ==
- "My Name is Legion: For We Are Many" Christian Science Journal (June 1910; reprinted December 1985) – contrasts his experience treating the sick as a medical doctor to his later experience in Christian Science
- "Wiser Than Serpents" Christian Science Journal (March 1925, republished in 1965 and 1980; translated into German, Danish, Greek, Spanish and Norwegian in 1968, and into French in 1969)
- "The Role of the Practitioner" Christian Science Sentinel (June 12, 1965)

== See also ==
- Edmund F. Burton
- Walton Hubbard
- Jer Master
