= Nettie Rogers Shuler =

American suffragist and author

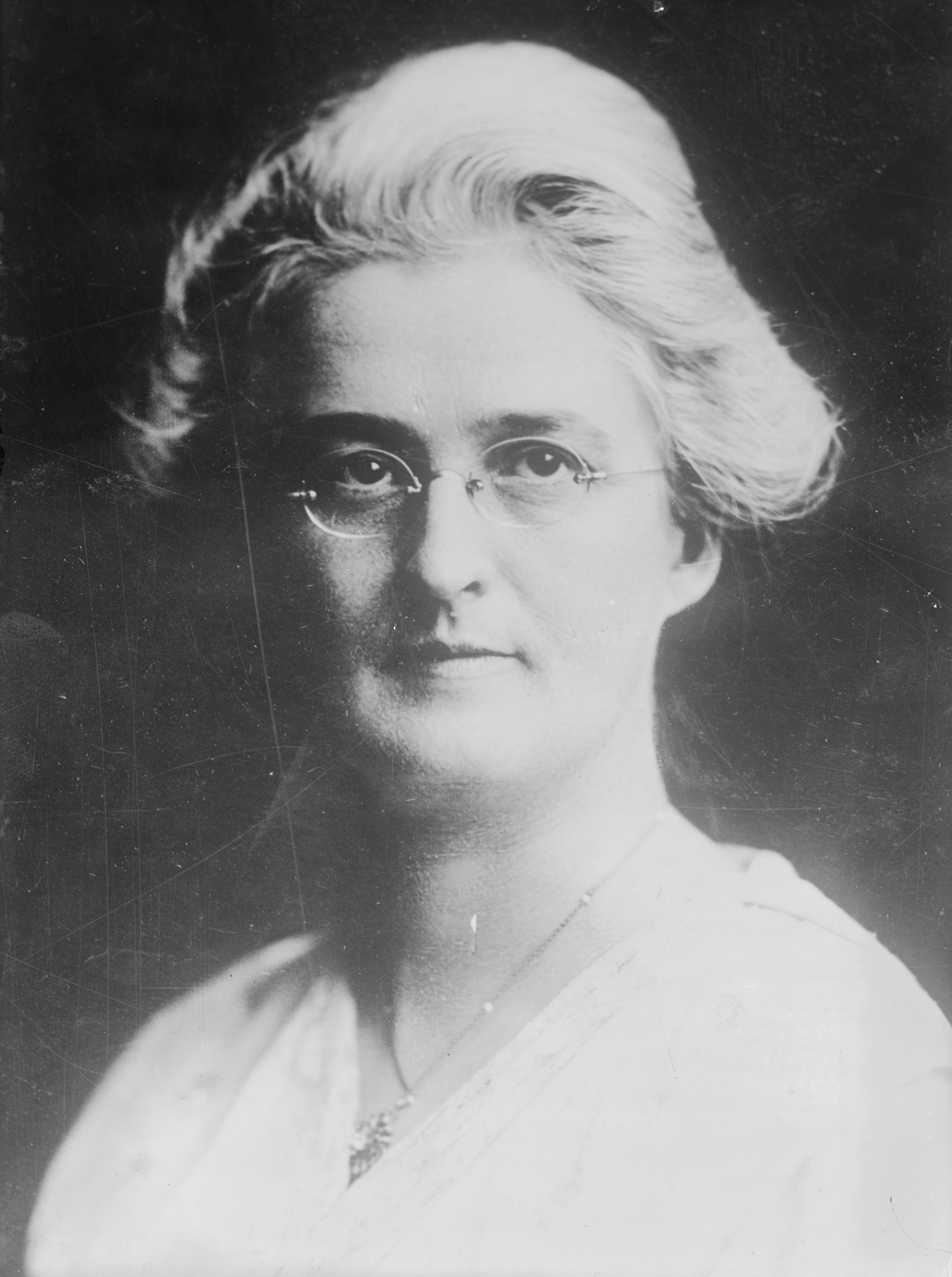
- Mrs. F.J. Shuler, 1915
- Born: Antoinette Rogers; November 8, 1862; Buffalo, New York
- Died: December 2, 1939 (aged 74); New York, New York
- Occupations: Writer, Suffragist, Clubwoman
- Notable work: Woman Suffrage and Politics: The Inner Story of the Suffrage Movement
- Spouse: Frank J. Shuler (m. 1887; died in 1916)
- Children: Marjorie (b. Nov. 10, 1888)

Antoinette "Nettie" Rogers Shuler (1862–1939) was an American suffragist and author.

== Biography ==
Shuler née Rogers was born on November 8, 1862, in Buffalo, New York. A graduate of Buffalo Central High School, she married Frank J. Shuler in 1887, with whom she had one child, a daughter named Marjorie who later joined Nettie in her suffrage work.

Shuler was an active suffragist involved with organizing and training suffragists in her home state of New York and throughout the country. She was President of the Western New York Federation of Women's Club's, and was a member and speaker at the National American Woman Suffrage Association (NAWSA). She gave many lectures and addressed various groups and state legislatures, including presenting the case for a suffrage amendment to the New York state legislature. After the passage of the Nineteenth Amendment Shuler collaborated with Carrie Chapman Catt to write the book Woman Suffrage and Politics: The Inner Story of the Suffrage Movement. The book was published in 1923 and traced the history of the women's suffrage in the United States from 1848 through 1920.

Shuler died in New York City on December 2, 1939.

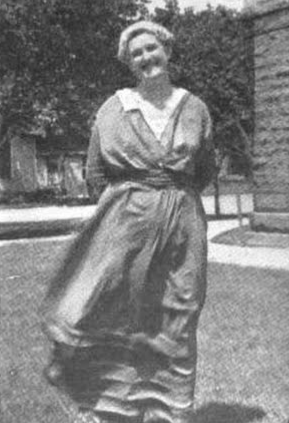
Nettie Rogers Shuler (1918)

== See also ==
- List of suffragists and suffragettes
- American Woman Suffrage Association
