= Edmund F. Burton =

American physician

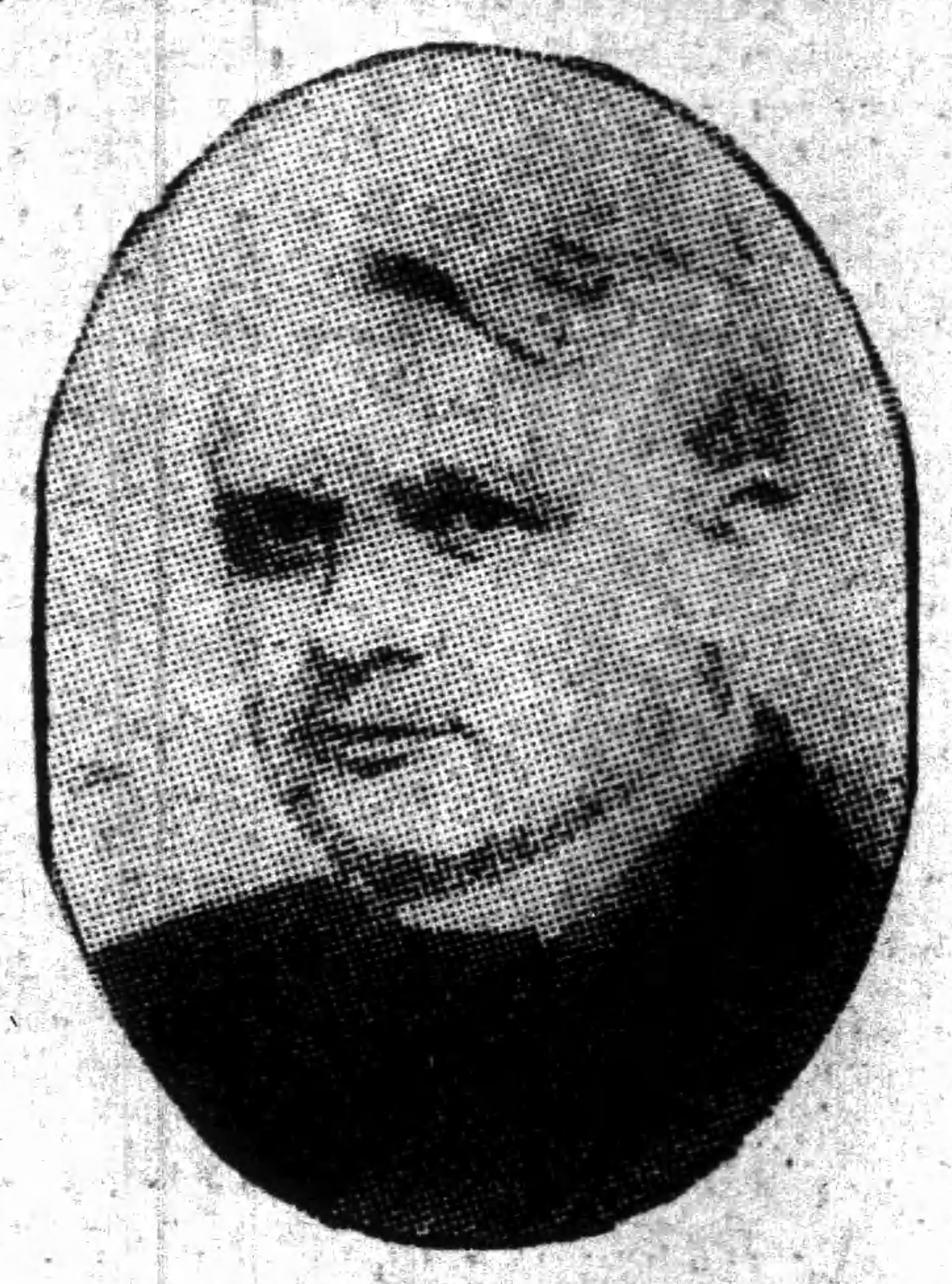
Dr. Edmund F. Burton

Edmund F. Burton (1862 – October 25, 1921) was an American physician who left medicine for the study of Christian Science. He was licensed to practice in Illinois, Arizona, and California. While still practicing medicine, he was a member of the American Medical Association.

== Career ==
He was a graduate of Rush Medical College in Chicago, Illinois, where he later taught. He was also on the surgical staff of Cook County Hospital. In 1896, he received the L. C. P. Freer Second Prize and wrote an article on tuberculosis for The Corpuscle, a publication of the Rush Medical College. Burton was a member of the American Medical Association, but resigned when he left medicine for Christian Science.

Finding himself ill with tuberculosis of the lungs, Burton became unable to work. He moved to what he hoped was a more favorable climate in Arizona, where he recovered enough to work as assistant surgeon of the United States Marine Hospital Service. His physical condition continuing to deteriorate, he then moved to California In an attempt to mask the pain, Burton became addicted to morphine, then to cocaine, as he then sought to counteract the drowsiness caused by the morphine. Eventually Burton was unable to eat, suffered a breakdown and fell unconscious for over 48 hours. Some physicians who knew him, in consultation, pronounced him incurable and said he had three weeks to live. His wife attempted to have him admitted to a private sanitarium, but they declined because his condition was so bleak. Christian Science was recommended to him and Burton said that in his desperate situation, he tried it, although assuming it would be useless. He instead found himself healed, which he wrote in 1908, made him

"determined to find out what it was, although I had no thought at that time that it could take me out of my profession. ... Suffice it to say I did not find just what I expected, and many times I put Science and Health away with a feeling of impatience that the grain of truth which I felt must be there was obscured and buried by what seemed to me a mass of nonsense; but each time there would come back to me the fact that I was alive and well—better mentally than ever in my life—whereas there was the certainty from a medical point of view that I would have been dead and buried..."

== Personal ==
Burton was married to Alberta Neiswanger Hall, a composer who wrote songs for children, including settings for L. Frank Baum's The Songs of Father Goose.

== See also ==
- Walton Hubbard
- Jer Master
- John M. Tutt
