= Château de Cinq-Mars =

French castle

Coordinates: 47°20′54″N 0°27′45″E

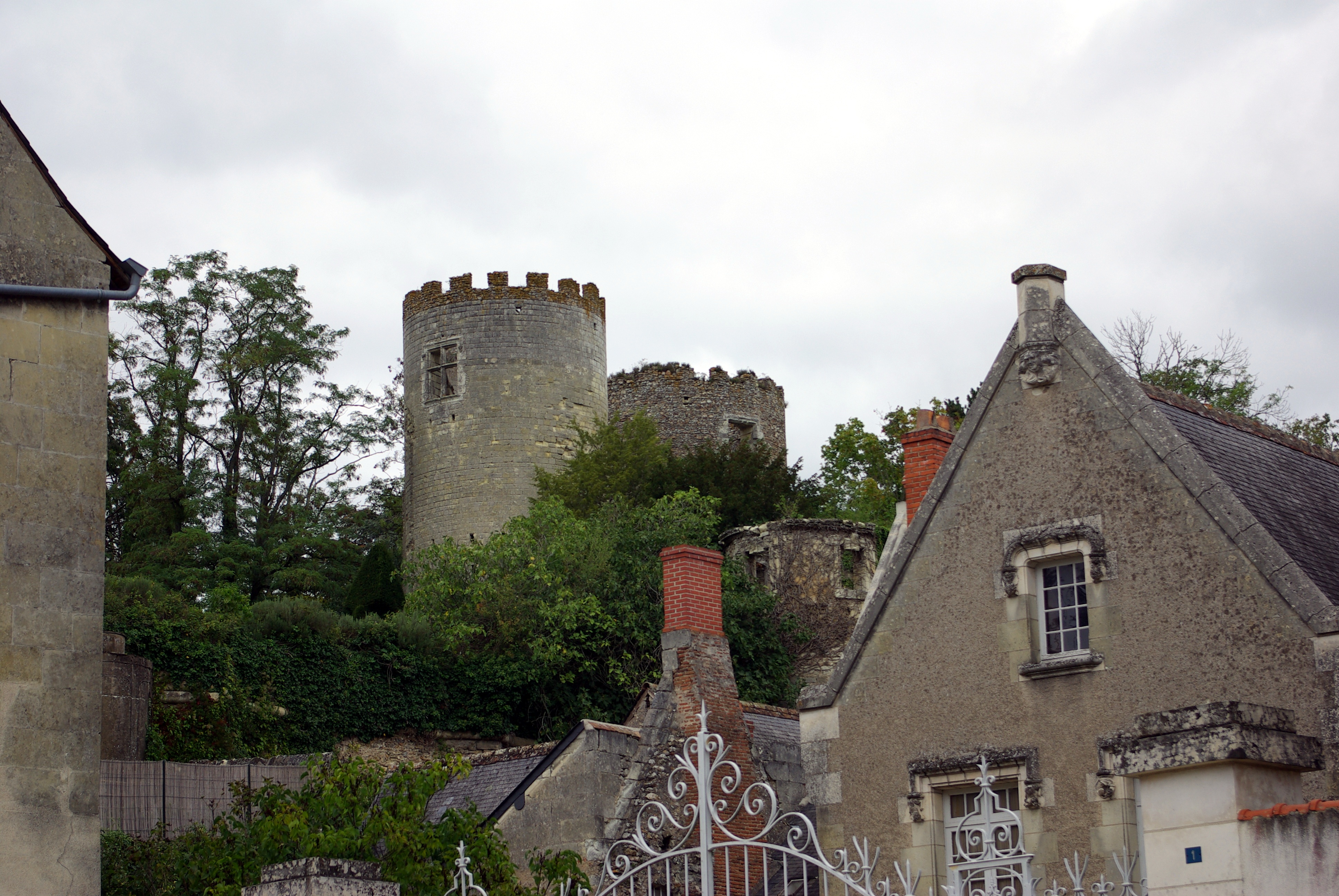
View of the castle's towers

The Château de Cinq-Mars is a castle in the commune of Cinq-Mars-la-Pile in the Indre-et-Loire département of France.

The castle was built in the 12th century, with significant additions and alterations from the 13th, 15th and 16th centuries.

== History ==
The first known feudal seigneur was living in 1050. Following the execution of the owner, Henri de Ruzé d'Effiat, Grand Écuyer (squire) and favourite of the King, in 1642 the fortress was razed by order of Cardinal Richelieu.

The 15th century guard house, whose façades were modified in the 18th and 19th centuries, developed between two round towers; the northern tower has an attached staircase tower. The fortress is surrounded by moats, rebuilt in the 16th century. The drawbridge was replaced by a fixed three-arched bridge. Of the four towers linked to the buildings or the curtain wall, only the East Tower, the South Tower (13th century) and the base of the North Tower (the end-of-12th century keep) remain.

The upper floors have been destroyed. The towers are crowned with a modern fantasy crenelation. A triangular construction, called the Eperon, extends from the south east of the fortress. The salient angle is occupied by a bartizan. It was constructed or remodelled in the 16th century, at the same time as the moats. In the corresponding corner of the wall above the moat is a cylindrical tower dating from the 15th century which contained a stone spiral staircase which allowed the lords to descend from the castle to the priory joined to the church.

The castle is privately owned. It has been listed since 1976 as a monument historique by the French Ministry of Culture.

== See also ==
- List of castles in France
