= Alberta N. Hall =

American composer

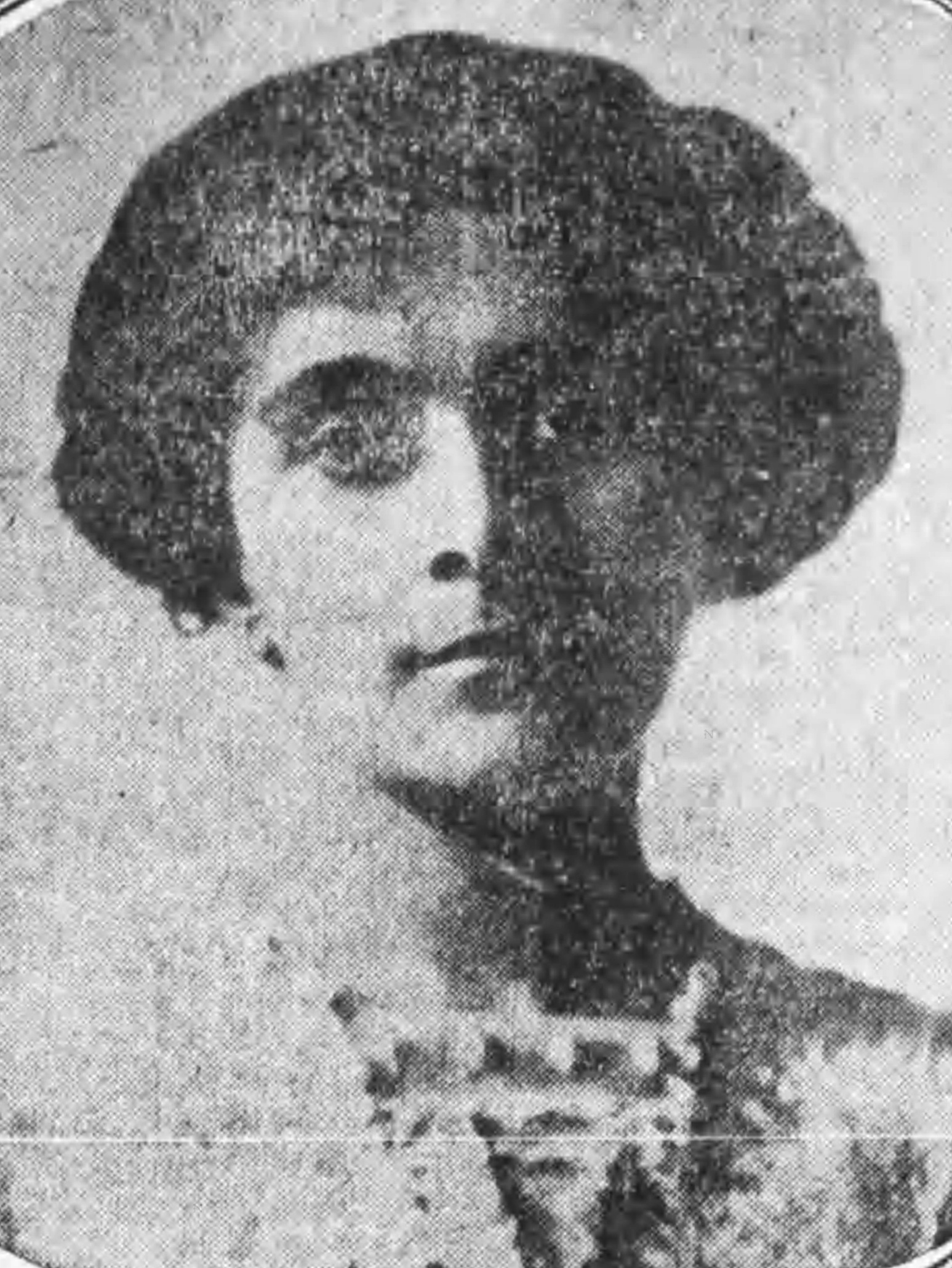

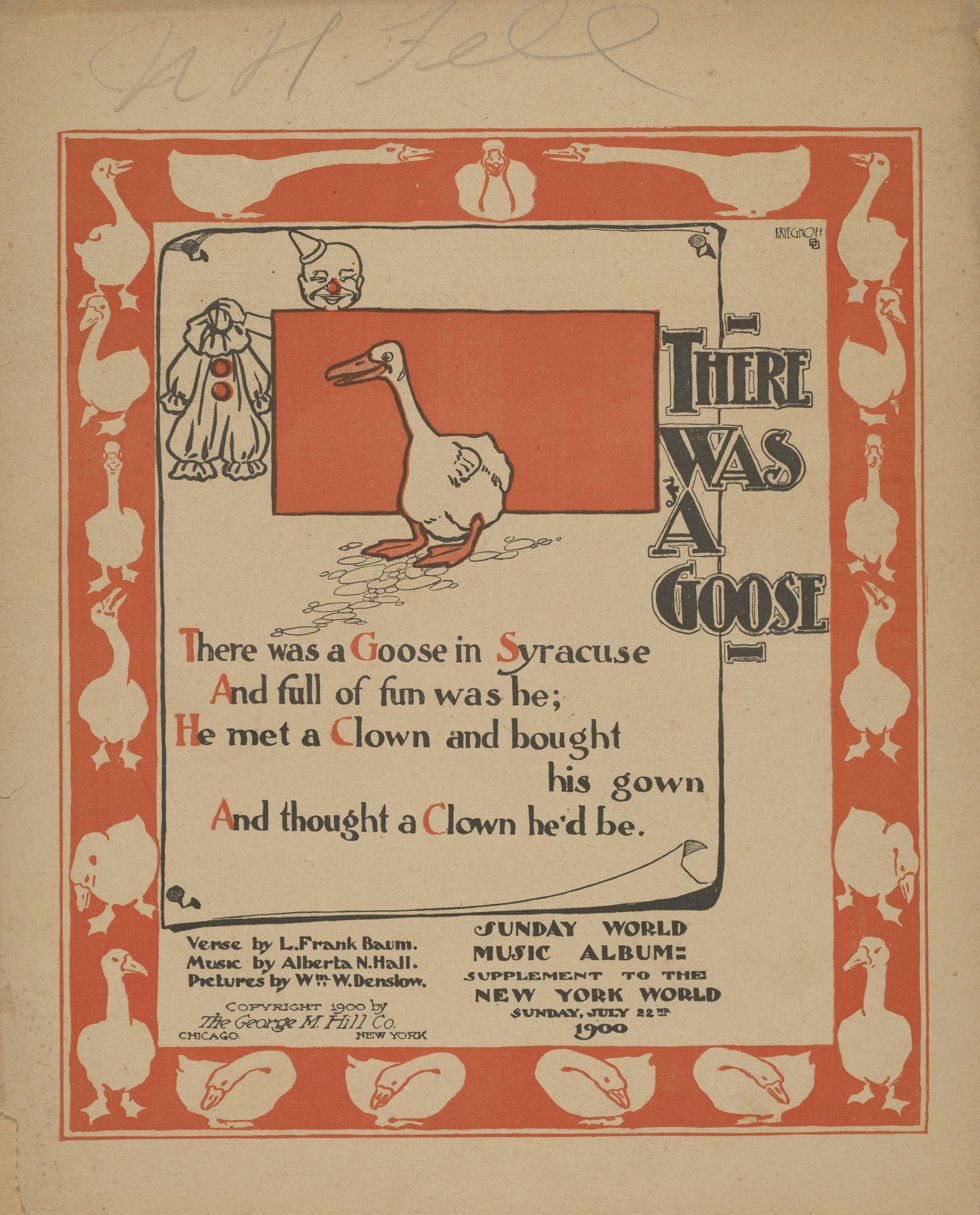
There Was a Goose, words by L. Frank Baum, music by Alberta N. Hall. (Supplement to the New York World. July 22, 1900)

Alberta Grace Neiswanger Hall (November 10, 1870 – May 9, 1956), also known as Alberta N. Burton, was an American composer of children's songs and books. She wrote musical settings for 26 poems in "The Songs of Father Goose" by L. Frank Baum in 1900.

Her other works include musical settings for Lizette Woodworth Reese" and Percy Blackmer, as well as her own original lyrics, and have been called "full of genuine melodic charm and no little skill of harmonic workmanship.

Neiswanger was born in Richmond, Virginia, to Joseph Neiswanger and Marion Louise Paxson. She married George Eckart Hall in 1893 in Chicago. They later divorced and in 1902 she married Edmund F. Burton, a physician who left medicine for the study of Christian Science. She also converted to the religion.

She died in Concord, New Hampshire.

== Selected works ==
- The Song of Father Goose (1900) – with L. Frank Baum and W. W. Denslow
- The Fruits of the Garden (May 1909) – article in The Christian Science Journal
- The Burro (1916) – arranged by Clarence C. Robinson
- New stories : (Community life), a second reader (1926) – with Marjorie Hardy and Matilda Breuer
- Happy days out west for Littlebits (1927) – with Edith Janice Craine and Dorothy Lake Gregory
