= Stephen Potter =

British writer (1900–1969)

Stephen Potter

Stephen Meredith Potter (1 February 1900 – 2 December 1969) was a British writer best known for his parodies of self-help books, and their film and television derivatives.

After leaving school in the last months of the First World War he was commissioned as a junior officer in the British Army, but by the time he had completed his training the war was over and he was demobilised. He then studied English at Oxford, and after some false starts he spent his early working life as an academic, lecturing in English literature at Birkbeck College, part of the University of London, during which time he published several works on Samuel Taylor Coleridge. Finding his income inadequate to support himself and his family, he left the university and took up a post producing and writing for the BBC. He stayed with the BBC until after the Second World War, when he became a freelance writer, and remained one for the rest of his life.

His series of humorous books on how to secure an unfair advantage began in 1947 with Gamesmanship, purporting to show how poor players can beat better ones by subtle psychological ploys. This sold prodigiously and led to a series of sequels covering other aspects of life. The books were adapted for the cinema in the 1960s and for television in the 1970s.

== Biography ==
=== Early years ===
Potter was born in Battersea, London, the only son of Frank Collard Potter (1858–1939), a chartered accountant, and his wife Elizabeth Mary Jubilee née Reynolds (1863–1950). He attended Westminster School from age 13 to 18, during the First World War. As he reached school-leaving age he wrote in his diary, "If this war doesn't end soon I shall have to join the beastly army and lay down my blooming life for my blinking country." He volunteered for the army, was trained as an officer and "passed out" (graduated) as top of his company. He was commissioned into the Coldstream Guards as a second lieutenant just as the war was ending, and did not see active service.

Potter was demobilised in 1919, and spent a few months in his father's office learning book-keeping, before going to Merton College, Oxford, to study English. His family paid for his university education, a fact that put him in the shadow of his elder sister Muriel (later a form mistress at St Paul's Girls' School, then headmistress of South Hampstead High School), who had won a scholarship to St Hugh's College, Oxford, and had taken a first-class degree. Potter achieved only a second-class degree in English language and literature. On the strength of this he was offered the post of talks producer at the BBC, but turned it down as it was based in the provincial city of Birmingham, where he had no wish to reside. Potter instead tried to earn a living as an elocution teacher in London, advertising "Cockney accents cured", but attracted only one pupil. He then tried his luck as a tutor and schoolmaster before becoming private secretary to a well-known playwright, Henry Arthur Jones.

== Lecturer in English literature ==
In 1926 Potter began teaching English literature at Birkbeck College, University of London. On 7 July 1927 he married Marian Anderson Attenborough (1900–1981), a painter professionally known as Mary Potter. There were two sons of the marriage Andrew (1928–2008) and Julian (1931–2013). The family at first lived in Chiswick, London, before moving to a flat in Harley Street.

Potter's first book, The Young Man (1929), was an autobiographical novel, which was well-reviewed. The Manchester Guardian wrote, "a brilliant performance ... a distinguished contribution to intellectual fiction." In 1930 he wrote D. H. Lawrence: A First Study, the first book-length work on Lawrence, which appeared in print within a few days of the death of its subject; unfortunate timing, because it seemed like an inadequate memorial rather than what it was intended to be, a critical reappraisal. It also suffered from a regrettable misprint, rendering the heading "Sea and Sardinia", as "Sex and Sardinia". This was soon amplified by rumour into "Sex and Sardines", none of which helped Potter's reputation as a serious writer. Potter's most comprehensive critic was the friend from whom he had inherited the Cape commission, G.B. Edwards, in Middleton Murry's Adelphi. After this he concentrated in his next four works on Coleridge. He edited the Nonesuch Press Coleridge (1933), praised in The Times as "the best anthology that has ever shown Coleridge as poet, philosopher and critic. This was followed by an edition of Sara Coleridge's letters to Thomas Poole, Minnow among Tritons (1934), which Potter edited from the original manuscripts in the British Museum. In 1941 he wrote a play, Married to a Genius, based on the Coleridge marriage. In 1935 he published his most important contribution to the subject, Coleridge and S.T.C., a discussion of the duality in the poet's nature, "not merely the earlier and the later, but the true and the false, and the exciting and the nauseating," as John Middleton Murry put it in a review in The Times Literary Supplement. Reviews were good, but with reservations that Potter oversimplified the dichotomy in Coleridge's nature (The Observer) or else did not explore the underlying reasons for it (TLS).

In 1937 Potter published The Muse in Chains: a Study in Education, a humorous satire on the academic teaching of English literature. G. M. Young wrote of it: "if I were suddenly commissioned by some Golden Dustman to organize a new University, I think I should send for Mr. Potter and offer him the Chair of English literature forthwith." Other reviewers thought Potter's suggestions more entertaining than practical. Potter's humorous insights into academic life were widely praised. He wrote of George Saintsbury: "It is recorded that for eighteen years he started the day by reading a French novel (in preparation for his history of them) – an act so unnatural to man as almost in itself to amount to genius."

=== BBC writer and producer ===
Potter first wrote for BBC radio in 1936. Finding that his academic career, although promising, was insufficiently well paid to support his family, he resigned from Birkbeck in 1937 and the following year joined the BBC as a writer-producer in its features department, originally concentrating on literary features and documentaries. In the same year he joined the Savile Club, known for its artistic and especially literary members, who have included Hardy, Kipling, and Yeats. He was a leading player of the club's idiosyncratic version of snooker, and some of his later "gamesmanship" ploys are thought to have originated in the Savile's games room.

At the outbreak of the Second World War Potter was sent by the BBC to work in Manchester. Later in the war years he and his wife moved south, living in a farmhouse in Essex where she found more scope to pursue her career as a painter. In 1943 Potter collaborated with Joyce Grenfell on a gently satirical comedy feature "How to Talk to Children". It was well received and they made twenty-eight more "How to ..." programmes, including "How to Woo" and "How to Give a Party". In 1946 "How to Listen" was the first broadcast heard on the newly created Third Programme. At the end of the war, Potter took on a number of concurrent literary tasks. These included drama critic for the New Statesman and book reviewer for the News Chronicle.

=== Gamesmanship and freelance writing ===
A ten-day power-cut at the beginning of 1947 prevented any broadcasting and gave Potter the opportunity to dash off a book. To the despair of his publisher he was a far from methodical author: every Potter manuscript was "a mass of dirty bits of paper, vilely typed, corrected in illegible biro, episodic and half-revised." This book, The Theory and Practice of Gamesmanship: Or the Art of Winning Games Without Actually Cheating, illustrated by Frank Wilson, was published in 1947, and sold prodigiously.

It was the first of his series of books purporting to teach ploys for manipulating one's associates, making them feel inferior and thus gaining the status of being one-up on them. From this book, the term "Gamesmanship" entered the English language. Potter said that he was introduced to the technique by C. E. M. Joad during a game of tennis in which Joad and Potter were struggling against two fit young students. Joad politely requested the students to state clearly whether a ball had landed in or out (when in truth it was so obviously out that they had not thought it necessary to say so). This nonplussed the students, who wondered if their sportsmanship was in question; they became so edgy that they lost the match. With the success of Gamesmanship, Potter left the BBC in 1949, ended his existing journalistic commitments, and briefly became editor of a weekly, Leader Magazine. The magazine closed in 1950, and thereafter he was a freelance writer for the rest of his life.

Potter followed up the success of Gamesmanship, extending the basic idea to many other aspects of life, in Some Notes on Lifemanship (1950), which was another big seller. In "Lifemanship" Potter extended the principles of gamesmanship to courtship ("Woomanship"), literature ("Writermanship") and pastimes ("Conversationship"). Thus for example the reader is enjoined, "never forget the uses of Lowbrowmanship in conversation ... LOWBROWMAN: Oh, I don't know, I rather like a good bit of old-fashioned vulgarity. And I'm awfully sorry but I like leg shows. If the Lowbrowman happens to be a Professor of Aesthetics ... his remark is all the more irritating". A related gambit for the journalist was ' Daily Mirrorship ... an unaffected love of tremendously ordinary and homely things like Danny Kaye, mild and bitter, the Daily Mirror, the Bertram Mills circus and Rita Hayworth". Potter mentions in passing how "in the last of my Bude lectures I spoke of Gamesmanship and Shakespeare, where most of my remarks referred to Footnote Play". His notes on Donmanship refer to the "art of Criticising without Actually Listening".

In his notes on Woomanship, Potter expresses surprise that "twelve times as many workers volunteered to send in reports on Woomanship as on any other subject". In mixed gamesmanship, for a man "a good working knowledge of the Chivalry Gambit is essential"; a woman's counter to "the least signs of trying the 'I have long adored you from afar' move", is to "treat it immediately as a formal proposal of marriage which you shyly accept. This is one of the most devastating, the most match-winning, counters in the whole realm of gamesmanship".

In 1951 Potter and his wife moved to Suffolk, to the Red House in Aldeburgh. The most famous local residents were Benjamin Britten and Peter Pears, with whom the Potters quickly became friendly. They got involved with the running of Britten's Aldeburgh Festival, and "every summer Britten, Peter Pears, and the Potters formed the nucleus of countless tennis parties on the grass court at the Red House." In 1954, Potter asked his wife for a divorce. She consented, and he moved away from Aldeburgh. Finding the Red House too large and expensive for one person, Mary Potter agreed to exchange houses with Britten and Pears, who moved into the Red House, with which they were associated for the rest of their lives and beyond. In 1955, after nearly 30 years of marriage, the Potters' divorce was finalised, and he remarried, to Heather Jenner, the founder of The Marriage Bureau. Their only child, Luke, was born the following year.

A second successor to Gamesmanship was published as One-Upmanship (1952). Potter had become well enough known overseas to be invited to give a literary lecture tour of America. He described his experiences in Potter on America (1956), which received a long and complimentary review in The Times Literary Supplement: "Mr. Potter's private army of Lifemen will need no recommendation to this latest frolic .... It is a pleasure to discover or rediscover the United States in this company, for the author is the most literate of humorists."

A third sequel to Gamesmanship, was published in 1958 under the title of Supermanship. Its publisher, Rupert Hart-Davis, privately wrote of the book, "Gamesmanship made me laugh a lot, and its two successors were just good enough (all three still sell prodigiously), but the world has moved (deathwards, you may say) in the last ten years, and Potter hasn't budged an inch. In truth the joke is played out, but he won't face the fact. This manuscript consists of a bunch of marginal articles, written during the past six years and slung together with the minimum of care." Some critics agreed. The New Yorker commented, "his methods and the point of view behind them don't seem as funny or as sharp as they once did, possibly because they are no longer surprising, or possibly because he is getting a little tired of his own joke." But Edmund Wilson remained a fan of Potter, praising "the brevity and compactness of the presentation. As in any practical manual, the principles are stated and concisely illustrated. Nothing goes on too long."

=== Later years ===
By the late 1950s the concept and the suffix "-manship" had entered the English language. The foreign policy of the American secretary of state John Foster Dulles was universally known as "brinkmanship", and in England Prince Philip borrowed from Potter in 1957, accusing accountants of "taxmanship – the art of scoring off the Inland Revenue without actually cheating". According to Joyce Grenfell, Potter had become bored with the joke by this time, "but for the rest of his life he found it difficult to speak or write naturally, so accustomed had he grown to the jocose gambits and ploys of his own invention." Potter himself was aware of the pigeonhole in which he had put himself. He described himself in The Times in 1967 as "one whose sole contribution to world thought has been the naming and description of the form of behaviour now known as gamesmanship". Another friend said of him, "This kind of fame was not what he had hoped for. He wanted to be a great serious writer. Yet that was totally beyond him."

Potter's last works went in new directions. In 1959 he wrote a corporate history of H.J. Heinz under the title The Magic Number, and his autobiography of his first 20 years, Steps to Immaturity. His publisher was doubtful about the latter, but it was well received. The Times Literary Supplement, called it "this sympathetic, beguiling book" and looked forward to a sequel, and other papers from The Daily Express to The New Statesman praised it in their reviews. In 1965 when his youngest son was about 9 years old, Potter wrote a children's book, Squawky, illustrated by George Him, with whom he had earlier created the mythical County of Schweppshire as part of an advertising campaign for a soft-drink manufacturer. At the time of his death he was making notes on word origins from the natural world; they were posthumously edited and published in 1973 as Pedigree: Essays on the Etymology of Words from Nature.

Potter died in 1969 of pneumonia in London at the age of 69.

== Adaptations and commemorations ==
The 1960 film School for Scoundrels recapitulates many of the "one-up" ideas, and extends them to "Woo-manship", meaning the art of manipulative seduction of women. The script was adapted by Peter Ustinov from Potter's books. The film starred Ian Carmichael as the innocent in need of Professor Potter's teaching, Alastair Sim as Potter, Terry-Thomas, Dennis Price and Peter Jones as exemplars of one-upmanship.

One-Upmanship is a British television series based on Potter's work. It was written and adapted by Barry Took for the BBC for a Christmas special, initially in 1974. Starring Richard Briers, Peter Jones (who also played a supporting role in School for Scoundrels), and Frederick Jaeger, it was subsequently broadened into three series that were broadcast between 1976 and 1978. Details of the broadcasts can be found on this BBC comedy Web site.

Potter's diaries, acquired by the University of Texas after his death, were a primary source for Stephen Potter at the BBC (2004) by his second son, Julian Potter, a chronicle of Potter's time in the features department of the BBC in the 1940s.

Raffles and the Match-Fixing Syndicate, by Adam Corres, is an extension of Potter's theories, explaining the principles of cricket gamesmanship and the psychology of "thinking the batsman out". In a 1959 article Edmund Wilson wondered why Potter, as an academic himself, did not "exploit the fertile field of one-upmanship among professors, whereupon Wilson proceeded to fill the gap".

In 2007, devotees of Potter created an annual winter golf tournament based on the tactics espoused in the author's book Gamesmanship. "The Potter Cup" is held annually at Fenwick Golf Course in Old Saybrook, Connecticut. The Potter Cup is the Oldest Cold Weather Golf Tournament in Continuous Existence in Connecticut.

== Wider influence ==
Eric Berne in his best-selling Games People Play readily acknowledges Potter's Gamemanship as a precursor: 'Due credit should be given to Stephen Potter for his perceptive, humorous discussions of manoeuvres, or "ploys", in everyday social situations'. Elsewhere he calls Potter 'the chief representative of the humorous exposition of ulterior transactions'.

What has been termed Potter's "blend of flat and serious tone (reminiscent of a gentlemanly sports handbook) united with a sceptical judgement of the values of the English middle-class social scene" would thus seem to have fed into Berne's own "sardonically humorous Games People Play ... con-games of daily life that Dr Berne describes with desperately penetrating gallows-wit".

Potter's ' Game Leg..."Limpmanship", as it used to be called, or the exact use of minor injury' precedes Berne's "Wooden Leg"; Potter's 'Nice Chapmanship ... Being a Nice Chap in certain circumstances is valuable' precedes Berne's "Good Joe"; Potter's "Advicemanship", whereby 'if properly managed, the mere giving of advice is sufficient' to win, precedes Berne's "I'm Only Trying to Help You", where 'the damage is done while being helpful'. And 'Just as there are O.K.-words in conversationship', so too in transactional analysis there are "O. K. Words: Words rewarded by parental approval ... those approved by the Parental part of the patient's father, mother, therapist, or other parental person".

Where Potter noted that "each gambit has its answer or 'counterlife'", Berne would note how everyone has positive forces in them "counter to the plot of [their] script – a counterscript"; where Potter offered 'Counter Psychiatry, which is, of course, a huge subject', Berne explored how "Psychiatry as a procedure must be distinguished from 'Psychiatry' as a game".

The sociologist Erving Goffman also profited from Potter's work, in the sense that it "disclose[s] an elaborate code of conventions which operated in everyday social intercourse, which was nevertheless tacit", and could be exploited by the sociologist: "what Potter's articles perhaps did, by their oblique but recognisable affinity with Goffman's own ideas, was to provide the kind of licence or mandate" Goffman needed to find his own creative approach.

== Bibliography ==
As of 2004, some of his works are out of print, but many have new editions. In 2005, Lifemanship was re-published by Moyer Bell.

- The Young Man. 1929
- D.H. Lawrence: A First Study. 1930
- Minnow Among Tritons. 1934
- (ed.): The Nonesuch Coleridge.1934
- Coleridge and S.T.C. 1935
- The Muse in Chains. 1937
- The Theory and Practice of Gamesmanship: Or the Art of Winning Games Without Actually Cheating. 1947. Illustrated by Frank Wilson
- Lifemanship: With a Summary of Recent Researches in Gamesmanship. 1950. Illustrated by Frank Wilson
- One-Upmanship: Being Some Account of the Activities and Teachings of the Lifemanship Correspondence College of One-Upness and Games Lifemastery. 1952. Illustrated by Frank Wilson
- The Sense of Humour. 1954
- Christmas-ship; or, The Art of Giving and Receiving. 1956
- Potter on America. 1956
- Supermanship, or, How to Continue to Stay Top without Actually Falling Apart. 1958. Illustrated by Frank Wilson.
- Steps to Immaturity: An Autobiography. 1959
- The Magic Number. 1959
- Anti-Woo: The Lifeman's Improved Primer for Non-Lovers. 1965. Illustrated by Frank Wilson
- Squawky, the One-up Parrot. 1965
- The Complete Golf Gamesmanship. (Also titled Golfmanship). 1968. Illustrated by Frank Wilson.
- The Complete Upmanship: Including, Gamesmanship, Lifemanship, One-Upmanship, Supermanship. 1970.
- Pedigree. 1973. (edited by Laurens Sargeant).
