= Nelly O'Brien (courtesan) =

Nelly O'Brien (model for Sir Joshua Reynolds paintings)

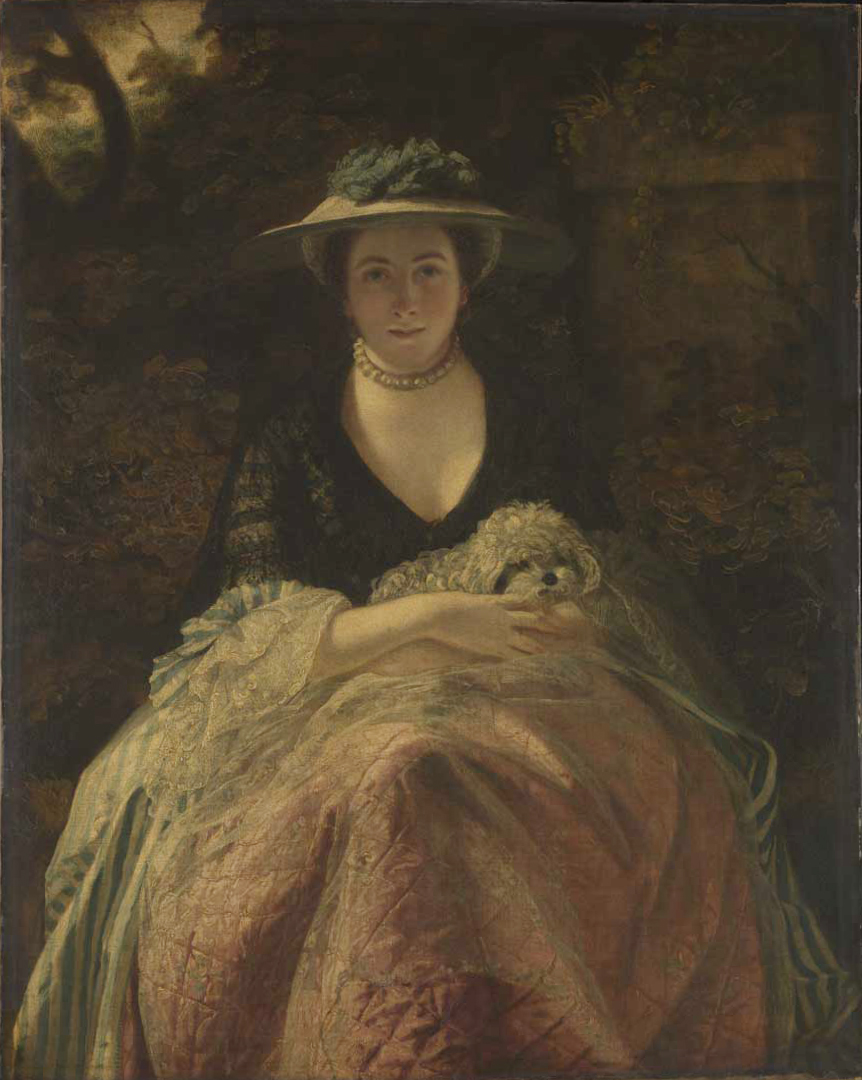
Portrait of Nelly O'Brien by Sir Joshua Reynolds, c.1762.

Nelly O'Brien (c. 1739 – c. 1768) was a courtesan, best known for having been painted by the artist Sir Joshua Reynolds. She is not to be confused with the later Irish artist Nelly O'Brien.

Little is known of her early life or her family background. She was an actress before becoming a courtesan, and for some time may have been the mistress of Augustus Keppel, who introduced her to Reynolds. She become the lover of Frederick St John, and he commissioned Reynolds to paint her twice between 1762 and 1764. Those paintings are now in the Wallace Collection and Hunterian Museum.

Nelly was rumoured to have had a son by Frederick St John in 1764, then became the lover of Sackville Tufton, to whom she bore two sons – Alfred (b. 1765) and Sackville (b. 1766).

Her cause of death is unknown. A record in the burial register for St Ann's, Blackfriars – dated December 29, 1767 and stating "Eleanor O'Brien, aged 29" – may refer to her.

The painting of her in the Wallace Collection was much admired and frequently copied in engravings. The art critic Jonathan Jones has written, "It's an urbane painting, neither looking down on Nelly nor getting all florid and rococo with excitement at painting a high-class prostitute. Her ambiguous social status frees Reynolds from the need to orate; there is no claim to grandeur here, instead an intimate directness."
