= Marjorie Shuler =

American publicist and author

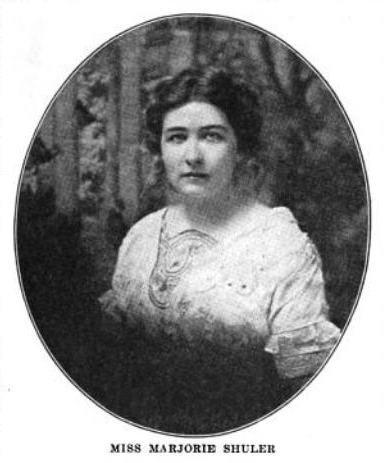
- Born: Marjorie Shuler; October 10, 1888; Buffalo, New York
- Died: 1977
- Other names: Marjorie Shuler Charles
- Occupations: Writer, activist
- Known for: Contributions to the women's suffrage movement
- Notable work: For Rent One Pedestal
- Spouse: Dr. Frank F. Charles

Marjorie Shuler (November 10, 1888 – 1977) was an American publicist and author for the woman suffragists from New York. She wrote for the National American Woman Suffrage Association (NAWSA) major publication, The Woman Citizen and was the author of several books about suffrage and voting, including The Woman Voter's Manual (1918) and one of the very few novels about suffrage, For Rent -- One Pedestal (1917). She was the daughter of Antoinette Nettie Rogers Shuler, a well known suffragist and one of the founders of NAWSA. Additionally, Shuler wrote a memoir of her flying trip around the world, the first ever by a woman, titled A Passenger to Adventure (Appleton-Century, 1939).

== Biography ==
Shuler was born on November 10, 1888, in Buffalo, New York. Her parents were Antoinette Nettie Rogers Shuler and Frank J. Shuler. "Nettie" Shuler, born on November 8, 1862, was an American woman suffragist and author, whose published works include, Woman Suffrage and Politics: The Inner Story of the Suffrage Movement, written with Carrie Chapman Catt. Marjorie Shuler grew up as a Republican, Christian Scientist, and advocate for Prohibition, but committed herself first to writing and publishing for the woman suffrage movement, and then after 1920 to reporting and writing about women's and world events.

Shuler held numerous positions and titles that contributed to the woman suffrage movement. She was categorized as one of the "New Women", which was a new generation of women who were shaped by the successes of suffragist predecessors. Shuler's passion for writing was clear in her publications, which are listed below. She was creative, witty, and transparent with her opinions about woman suffrage where she states "the establishment of a special school primarily for women is the result of the granting of equal suffrage. It is valuable proof of politics as a unifying instead of separating force between men and women". Shortly after, she voiced "there has been opposition to college training instead of the mechanic’s bench for the boy, to domestic science school instead of the family cookstove for the girl". As described in Joseph Dewey's encyclopedia article on Shuler, she and the other young woman suffragists had to learn how to negotiate and attract both sides of the political aisle to get things done. Using her writing skills, she was a publicist for NAWSA and local campaigns in New York. She was also associate editor for NAWSA's publication The Woman Citizen. In addition to her work for NAWSA, she created and profited from the Business Women's Club, she was elected City Chairman of Buffalo, New York, and was a member of the Scribblers of Buffalo. Before women won the vote, she was chair of Suffrage Commission of New York State. Shuler was known to be humorous in her writing and passion for travel. Both she and her mother were Christian Scientists, and Marjorie became a longtime writer for the Christian Science Monitor newspaper.

Shuler was in attendance for the signing of the Senate Suffrage Amendment on June 4, 1919, along with Mrs. Helen Gardener, Mrs. Ida Husted Harper, Mrs. Harriet Taylor Upton, and Miss Mary G. Hay. This amendment was passed by the House of Representatives with a vote of 304 to 89 and was then passed in the Senate with a vote of 56 to 25. The next step for women suffragists was to ratify the amendment in time for the next Presidential election.

In 1938, as a travelling correspondent for the Christian Science Monitor, Shuler visited Australia and was described as "one of the most important women journalists to visit Australia." She was asked by a reporter for a message for Australian women, to which she responded, "The most important thing is to think rightly. Nothing can stop you thinking and advancing...The only thing that can keep you narrow and remote from the world is the barrier that you put up yourself."

Shuler married Dr. Frank F. Charles on June 10, 1939, in New York City, who graduated from University of Heidelberg and became a biologist and writer. He was the son of Mr. and Mrs. Ignatz Charles and grew up in Berlin. Their marriage announcement appears in the New York Times on 27 May 1939. Notably, Shuler appears to have continued to use her maiden name after her marriage, which was unusual for women of the time.

Shuler was known to be a good friend of Eleanor Roosevelt. She even extended a wedding invite to Mrs. Roosevelt, but Roosevelt could not attend because a member of a European royal family was visiting. She sent a gift in her absence. Shuler's close relationship with Mrs. Roosevelt aided in her attempts to help asylum-seekers fleeing Europe from Nazi Germany. To bring her sister-in-law's family over to America, she wrote letters to the Chief of Visa division A.M. Warren to secure visas, but she was too late and her family members were taken by the Germans. This was a small case for the US Government when American immigration laws were preventing safety for Jews. Shuler reached out to Mrs. Roosevelt for help in a "heartfelt" letter that convinced Mrs. Roosevelt to take action in acquiring visas for her family members.

She died in 1977.

== Publications ==
- Several articles for NAWSA's The Woman Citizen (1919-1922)
- Several articles for The American Review of Reviews (1921-1924)
- Articles for The Farmer's Wife (1927)
- Articles for The Christian Science Monitor

Books

- For Rent—One Pedestal (novel) (1917)
- The Woman Voter’s Manual with S.E. Forman and Carrie Chapman Catt (1918)
- Your Government: A Civics Handbook (1921)
- Defeating the Voters at the Polls (1922)
- Congress and its Work Under the Party System (1922)
- The State Legislature and its Work Under the Party System (1922)
- Political Party Control and its Purpose and Methods (1922)
- Political Party Finances: Their Origin and Uses (1922)
- Social Conditions in Soviet Russia with William Chapman White and Maurice Hindus (1931)
- Have It Your Own Way (1932)
- Are There Opportunities for Women? (1935)
- In the Public Service : Mrs. Rosalie Edge, free to choose a career, prefers conservation work, and she encourages other women to serve usefully (1938)
- A Passenger to Adventure (1939)
- Lady Editor: Careers for Women in Publishing with Ruth Adams Knight and Muriel Fuller (1941)

== Editorial Roles ==
- Associate Editor for The Woman Citizen (1920–21)
- Staff Contributor in The Trend: A Bulletin of Current History and Letters

== Accomplishments and positions ==
- Press Secretary for NAWSA's Congress Committee
- Secretary of the National Federations of Business and Professional Women
- Elected City Chairman in Buffalo, NY
- Founder, Business Women's Club, Buffalo, NY

== See also ==
- List of suffragists and suffragettes
