= Olive Moorman Leader =

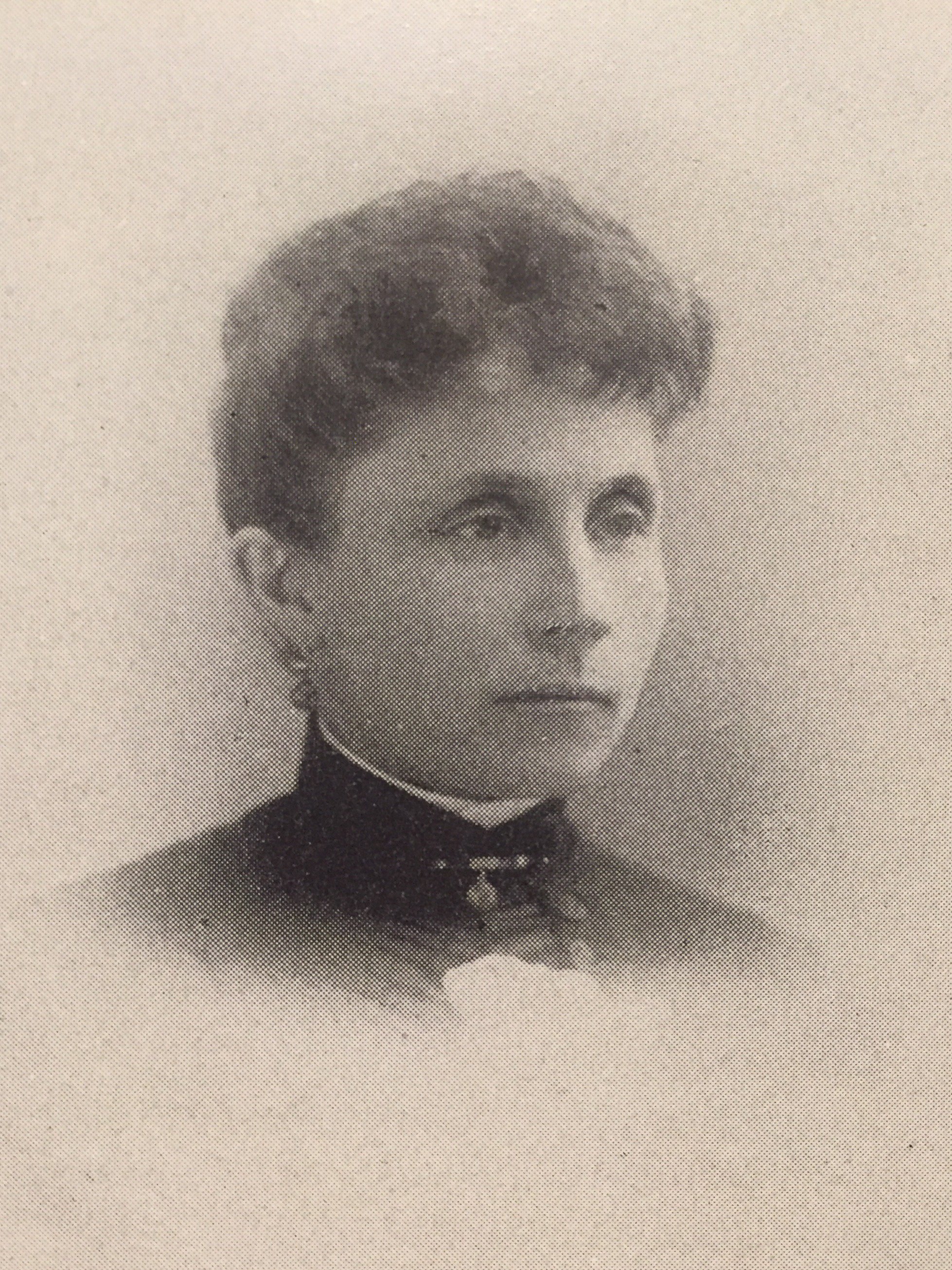
- Olive M. Leader, A Woman of the Century
- Born: Olive Ann Moorman; July 28, 1852; Franklin, Ohio, US
- Died: April 9, 1930 (aged 77); Wood Lake, Nebraska, US
- Occupation(s): Teacher, activist

Olive Ann Moorman Leader (July 28, 1852 – April 9, 1930) was a temperance reformer, suffragist, educator, and human rights activist.

== Early life ==
Olive Ann Moorman was born in Franklin, Ohio, on July 28, 1852. In her early childhood her parents moved to Iowa, but she returned to Ohio to finish her education. As a child her ambition was to become an educator, and all her energies were directed to that end.

== Career ==
For thirteen years Olive Moorman Leader was a successful teacher. She taught in the schools of Keokuk, Iowa, Plattamouth, Lincoln and Seward, Nebraska.

She was identified with school work in Seward, Lincoln and Plattsmouth successively, and, moving to Omaha, she began, in connection with the Woman's Christian Temperance Union, active work in the temperance cause.

She introduced the systematic visiting of the Douglas county jails. She was one of the first workers among the Chinese, being first State superintendent of that department.

In 1887, moving to Dakota Territory, she worked indefatigably for its admission as a prohibition State. During her three years' residence in Dakota she was State superintendent of miners' and foreign work in the Woman's Christian Temperance Union.

In 1889, she returned to Nebraska and settled in Chadron, Nebraska. She was for two years superintendent of soldiers' work in Nebraska, and was for twelve years identified with the suffrage cause.

She was an adherent of Christian Science and a strong believer in its efficacy, having, as she firmly believed, been personally benefited thereby. While living in Chadron, Leader established the Christian Science Church there.

In 1901, she moved to a ranch in Cherry County, Nebraska and then in 1919 she moved again to Wood Lake, Nebraska.

She was a member of the Eastern Star Work and organized the Wood Lake Culture Club.

== Personal life ==
On April 5, 1880, Olive Moorman married Joseph Baird Leader, a pioneer railroad man on the Northwestern, and moved to Seward, Nebraska.

She died on April 9, 1930, in Wood Lake, Nebraska, and is buried at Greenwood Cemetery, Chadron.
