= Olim (disambiguation) =

Olim means immigrants on aliyah to Israel.

Olim L'Berlin is a snowclone of that notion, used as protest against high consumer prices in Israel.

Olim may also refer to:

- Olim (botany)
- "Olim" is a song from the 1999 musical Der Glöckner von Notre Dame (The Hunchback of Notre Dame). "Olim" is the Latin language version of the song "Someday."
- Olim v. Wakinekona, a United States Supreme Court case.

== People with the name ==
- Luís Olim (born 1981), Portuguese professional footballer
- Jason Olim, CEO and a co-founder of Freshman Fund
- Olim Navkarov (born 1983), Uzbekistani footballer
- Olim Kamalov, Tajik artist

== See also ==
- Mr Olim, a novel by Ernest Raymond
