= For Them That Trespass (novel) =

1944 novel

- First US edition
- Author: Ernest Raymond
- Language: English
- Genre: Thriller
- Publisher: Cassell (UK); E. P. Dutton (US)
- Publication date: 1944
- Publication place: United Kingdom
- Media type: Print

For Them That Trespass is a 1944 thriller novel by the British writer Ernest Raymond. Christopher Drew, a respected writer and family man, faces ruin when a past affair with a London prostitute threatens to come out.

== Film adaptation ==
In 1949 it was adapted into a film of the same title directed by Alberto Cavalcanti and starring Stephen Murray, Richard Todd, and Patricia Plunkett.

== Bibliography ==
- Chibnall, Steve. J. Lee Thompson. Manchester University Press, 2000.
- Goble, Alan. The Complete Index to Literary Sources in Film. Walter de Gruyter, 1999.
- Snell, Keith. The Bibliography of Regional Fiction in Britain and Ireland, 1800–2000. Routledge, 2017.
