= For Them That Trespass =

- UK theatrical poster
- Directed by: Alberto Cavalcanti
- Written by: J. Lee Thompson
- Based on: For Them That Trespass by Ernest Raymond
- Produced by: Victor Skutezky
- Starring: Stephen Murray; Patricia Plunkett; Richard Todd
- Cinematography: Derick Williams
- Edited by: Margery Saunders
- Music by: Philip Green
- Production company: Associated British Picture Corporation
- Distributed by: Associated British-Pathé (UK)
- Release date: 21 April 1949 (London UK)
- Running time: 95 minutes
- Country: United Kingdom
- Language: English
- Budget: £150,232
- Box office: £124,978 (UK)

For Them That Trespass is a 1949 British crime film directed by Alberto Cavalcanti and starring Richard Todd, Patricia Plunkett and Stephen Murray. It is an adaptation of the 1944 novel of the same name by Ernest Raymond.

The film's main theme is miscarriage of justice. In the film, a professional writer witnesses a murder. He decides not to testify on behalf of an innocent man accused of the crime, wishing to protect his own reputation. The innocent man spends 15 years in prison for the murder. Once released, he tries to clear his name.

== Plot ==
Promising writer Christopher Drew conceals his relationship with a murdered woman in order to protect his career, even though this results in an innocent man going to prison for the killing.

The upper-class Drew decides he needs some first-hand experience to invigorate his work, so he explores the seedier areas of town in search of inspiration. Much to his dismay, he witnesses a murder, but he then refuses to help an innocent man, Herbert Logan, who has been arrested for the crime, because his presence in such a neighbourhood would cause a scandal. Logan is freed after serving 15 years in jail. He hears his "crime" detailed in a radio drama written by Drew and gathers enough evidence to clear his name.

== Cast ==
- Richard Todd as Herbert Edward Logan
- Patricia Plunkett as Rosie
- Stephen Murray as Christopher Drew
- Michael Laurence as Jim Heal
- Vida Hope as Olive Mockson
- Rosalyn Boulter as Frankie Ketchen
- James Hayter as 'Jocko': John Cragie Glenn
- Harry Fowler as Dave
- George Hayes as Artist
- Michael Brennan as Inspector Benstead
- Joan Dowling as Gracie
- Michael Medwin as Len
- Mary Merrall as Mrs. Drew
- Irene Handl as Inn owner
- John Salew as Ainsley, Prosecutor
- Robert Harris as Sir Huntley, Defence counsel
- Kynaston Reeves as The Judge
- Helen Cherry as Mary Drew
- Frederick Leister as The Vicar
- Edward Lexy as the Second Prison Warder
- Valentine Dyall as Toastmaster
- Charles Lloyd Pack as Theatre Critic
- Andreas Malandrinos as Nicholas
- George Merritt (actor) as Engine Driver
- Kenneth Moore (1914-1982) - as Prison Warder
- Alan Wheatley as Librarian

== Production ==
It was the first film to be made at Elstree Studios since it re-opened following World War II.

Richard Todd was cast after a screen test. It was his first leading role. His casting was announced in July 1948. He was also signed to a seven-year contract with Associated British. The film led to Todd being cast in The Hasty Heart.

Kenneth More has one of his first film roles.

== Critical reception ==
The New York Times called it "a drab and dreary little film". On the other hand, Sky Movies calls it a "gripping movie drama which has a lot of high feeling and style. ... Still impressive, though more than 40 years after."

Todd called it "dreary" but it led to him being offered a long-term contract with Associated British.

== Box office ==
As of 1 April 1950 the film earned distributor's gross receipts of £71,954 in the UK of which £38,467 went to the producer. The film made a loss of £111,765.
