= Anthony Buckeridge =

English author (1912–2004)

Anthony Malcolm Buckeridge
- Anthony Buckeridge
- Born: 20 June 1912; London, England
- Died: 28 June 2004 (aged 92)
- Occupation: Novelist
- Writing career
- Language: English
- Period: 1948–1994
- Notable work: Jennings series

Anthony Malcolm Buckeridge OBE (20 June 1912 – 28 June 2004) was an English author, best known for his Jennings and Rex Milligan series of children's books. He also wrote the 1953 children's book A Funny Thing Happened which was serialised more than once on Children's Hour.

He was awarded the OBE in 2003.

== Personal life ==
Buckeridge was born in Hendon in Middlesex, the son of Ernest George Buckeridge and his wife, Gertrude Alice (formerly Smith), but, following the death of his bank secretary father in World War I, he moved with his mother to Ross-on-Wye to live with his grandparents. Following the end of the war they returned to London where the young Buckeridge developed a taste for theatre and writing. A scholarship from the Bank Clerks' Orphanage fund permitted his mother to send him to Seaford College boarding school which, at the time, was located at Corsica Hall in Seaford, East Sussex. His experiences as a schoolboy there were instrumental in his later work.

Following the death of Buckeridge's maternal grandfather, the family moved to Welwyn Garden City where his mother worked in promoting the new suburban utopia to Londoners. In 1930 Buckeridge began work at his late father's bank but soon tired of it. Instead he took to acting including an uncredited part in Anthony Asquith's 1931 film Tell England.

After marrying his first wife, Sylvia Brown, he enrolled at University College London where he involved himself in Socialist and anti-war groups (he later became an active member of CND) but did not take a degree after failing Latin. With a young family to support, Buckeridge found himself teaching in Suffolk and Northamptonshire which provided further experiences to influence his later work. During World War II Buckeridge was called up as a fireman and wrote several plays for the stage before returning to teaching at St Lawrence College, Ramsgate.

He used to tell his pupils stories about the fictional Jennings (based, however, on an old schoolfellow Diarmaid Jennings), a prep schoolboy boarding at Linbury Court Preparatory School, under headmaster Mr Pemberton-Oakes.

In 1962, he met his second wife, Eileen Selby. They settled near Lewes where Buckeridge continued to write and also appeared in small (non-singing) roles at Glyndebourne.

Buckeridge died on 28 June 2004 after a spell of ill health. He is survived by his second wife Eileen and three children, two from his first marriage.

== Works ==
After World War II Buckeridge wrote a series of radio plays for the BBC's Children's Hour chronicling the exploits of Jennings and his rather more staid friend, Darbishire; the first, Jennings Learns the Ropes, was first broadcast on 16 October 1948. In 1950, the first of more than twenty novels, Jennings Goes to School, appeared. The tales make liberal use of Buckeridge's inventive schoolboy slang ("fossilised fish hooks!", "crystallised cheesecakes!", and others). These books, as well known as Frank Richards' Billy Bunter books in their day, were translated into a number of other languages. The stories of middle-class English schoolboys were especially popular in Norway where several were filmed.

The Norwegian books and films were rewritten completely for a Norwegian setting with Norwegian names; Jennings is called "Stompa" in the Norwegian books; a nickname based on the main character's intials St.O.M.P.A., which stands for Stein Oskar Magel Paus-Andersen.

More recently, the first four books were published in an omnibus edition by Prion, The Best of Jennings: Four Utterly Wizard Adventures All Jolly Well Complete and Unabridged (2010). In 2011, six titles were produced as unabridged audio books.

== Reception ==
Buckeridge made no small contribution to postwar British humour, a fact acknowledged by such comedians as Stephen Fry. The deftly-worded farce and delightful understatement of his narratives has been compared to the work of P. G. Wodehouse, Ben Hecht and Ben Travers.

== Jennings novels ==
The "Jennings" series is a collection of humorous novels of children's literature. There are 24 in total. The first, Jennings Goes to School (ISBN 0-333-65523-0), appeared in 1950 and new titles were published regularly until the mid-1970s (the last for fourteen years was Jennings at Large in 1977, the only book to feature Jennings during the school holidays), with two more in the 1990s (Jennings Again in 1991 and That's Jennings in 1994). As well as the name change to Stompa in Norway, in France "Jennings" was changed to Bennett and in Germany to Freddy.

The novels usually followed a format of three major subplots per 16-chapter novel, the early books being derived from the popular BBC radio series on Children's Hour. All 62 of the original radio play scripts have been published in 10 volumes by David Schutte: Jennings Sounds the Alarm 1999; Jennings Breaks the Record 2000; Jennings Joins the Search Party 2001; Jennings to the Rescue 2002; Jennings and the Roman Remains 2002; Jennings and the Tricky Predicament 2003; Jennings and the Organised Outing 2004; Jennings and the Christmas Spirit 2004; Jennings and the Key to the Mystery 2004; and Jennings and the Unconsidered Trifles 2004.

== Rex Milligan ==
Rex Milligan is a fictional character created by Anthony Buckeridge, and is the eponymous schoolboy hero of a series of five books set in the mid 20th century. The school that he attends is a grammar school named Sheldrake Grammar School in North London. The stories are presented in first person narrative, in contrast to the Jennings series. The final book is a compilation of 16 stories first published in the best-selling Eagle comic.

=== Characters ===
- J.I.G. (Jigger) Johnson. Red-haired, level-headed, animal-loving best friend of Rex.
- 'Alfie' Cutforth (Alfie, short for alphabet, because his initials are A.B.C). Loud-mouthed know-all.
- J.O. Stagg (Staggers). Inventor of ambitious, but ultimately unworkable gadgets.
- Boko Phipps. A little slow on the rugby field, but good at Maths – and even better at doing impersonations of the Maths teacher (see below).
- Mr. Birkinshaw, aka 'Old Birkie', or 'The Birk'. Teacher short of temper, much in the mould of Mr. Wilkins from Jennings, who teaches Maths.
- Mr. Frisby, aka 'The Frizzer', a teacher mild in manner who teaches French and English. Well liked and respected by the pupils, even if his banter is, in Milligan's words, "a bit Form One-ish, if you know what I mean". The Frizzer possesses an interesting, if rather unreliable, old-fashioned car, which features prominently in 'Rex Milligan's Busy Term'.
- Mr. R.G. Hunter, The Headmaster, aka 'The Head-Hunter'. Firm but fair Head, a former Middlesex cricketer and athletics champion, whose speeches are often rather long-winded, but nevertheless very well respected by staff and pupils alike.
- Mr. Stanton. Easy-going and well-respected games teacher, who always treats pupils just as they deserve.
- Spikey Andrews, football captain for Sheldrake's deadly rival school, "the Secondary Tech".
- Bubblegum Tucker, another pupil at the Secondary Tech.
- Mr Howard, aka 'Old Snorker', teacher at the Secondary Tech.
- Mr P.V. Lindgrun. Slimy and crooked owner of the nearby Premier Garage – he features prominently in 'Rex Milligan's Busy Term'.

=== List of books ===
- Rex Milligan's Busy Term
- Rex Milligan Raises the Roof
- Rex Milligan Holds Forth
- Rex Milligan Reporting
- Introducing Rex Milligan

== Other works ==
As well as the standalone 1953 children's book A Funny Thing Happened, Buckeridge also wrote a serial, 'Liz', for the BBC Radio 4 children's omnibus programme '4th Dimension', broadcast in 6 parts in May and June 1974.
