= A Chorus Ending =

1951 novel

- First edition (UK)
- Author: Ernest Raymond
- Language: English
- Genre: Crime
- Publisher: Cassell
- Publication date: 1951
- Publication place: United Kingdom
- Media type: Print

A Chorus Ending is a 1951 crime novel by the British writer Ernest Raymond. Like his most celebrated work We, the Accused it was inspired by the Doctor Crippen case.

== Synopsis ==
Everett Armidy, a modest employee at the Hoxley Green reference library becomes drawn into a passionate affair, which ends tragically in his committing murder.

== Bibliography ==
- Snell, Keith. The Bibliography of Regional Fiction in Britain and Ireland, 1800–2000. Routledge, 2017.
- Trestrail, John H. Criminal Poisoning: Investigational Guide for Law Enforcement, Toxicologists, Forensic Scientists, and Attorneys. Springer Science & Business Media, 2007.
