= Kamalov =

Kamalov is a Turkic, Russian and Ukrainian surname. Notable people with the surname include:

- Gadzhimurat Kamalov, (1965–2011), Russian investigative journalist
- Olim Kamalov (born 1960), Tajik painter
- Rafik Kamalov (died 2006), Kyrgyzstani imam
