= Ernest Raymond =

British novelist

Ernest Raymond OBE
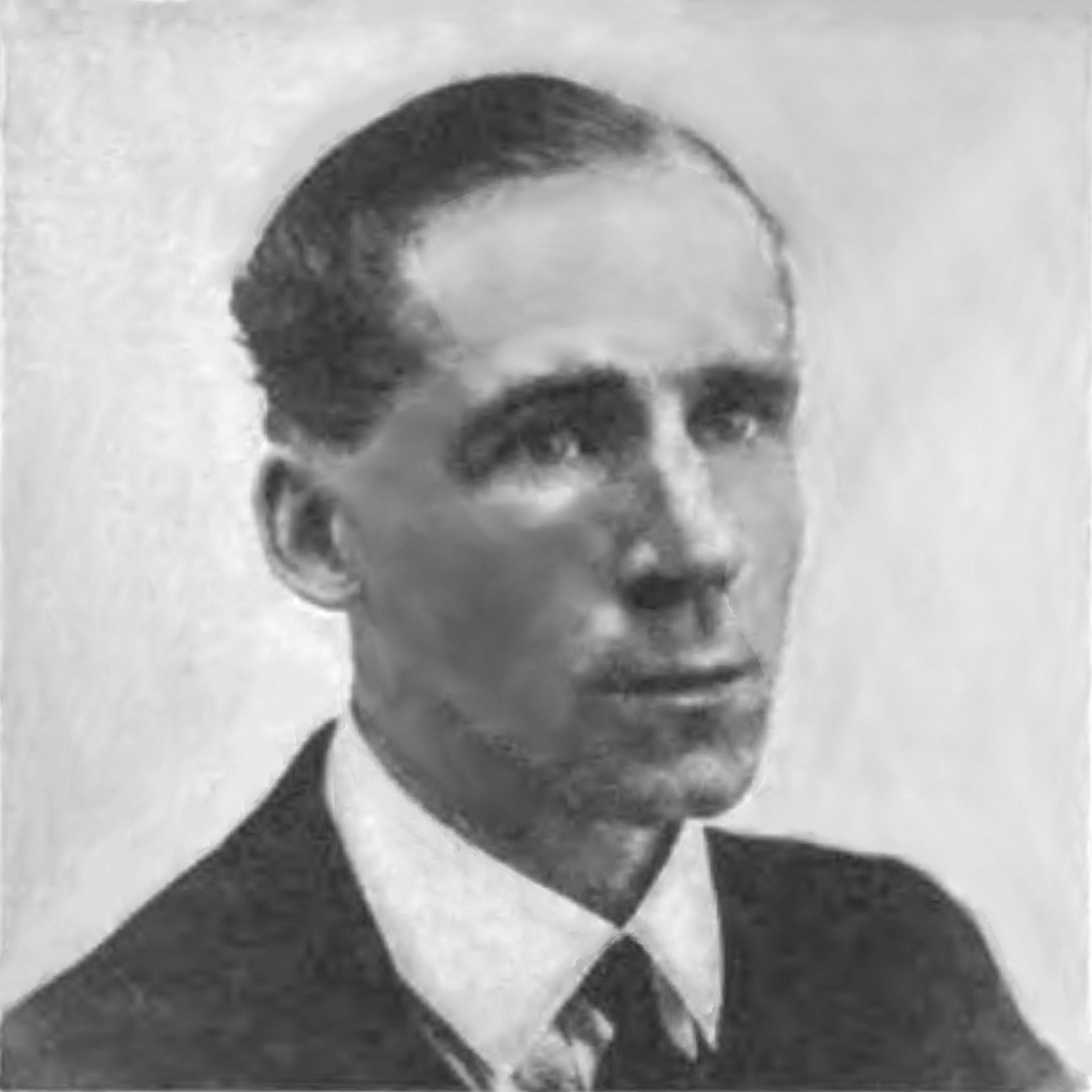
- Ernest Raymond c. 1920
- Born: 31 December 1888; Argentières, France
- Died: 14 May 1974 (aged 85); Hampstead, England
- Education: St Paul's School; Chichester Theological College; Durham University
- Occupation: Novelist
- Writing career
- Notable works: Tell England; We, the Accused; For Them That Trespass; A Chorus Ending; The Quiet Shore; Mr Olim

Ernest Raymond OBE (31 December 1888 – 14 May 1974) was a British novelist, best known for his first novel, Tell England (1922), set in World War I. His next biggest success was We, the Accused (1935), generally thought to be a reworking of the Crippen case. Raymond was a highly prolific writer, with an output of forty-six novels, two plays and ten non-fiction works.

== Early life ==
Ernest Raymond was born in Argentières, France, the illegitimate son of a British Army officer. He lived with his abusive aunt as a child. Her sister, his undisclosed mother, lived nearby with her family.

Raymond was educated at St Paul's School, London and at Chichester Theological College, before moving on to Durham University to read for a degree in theology. At Durham he did not join any of the colleges and studied as an 'unattached' member. He was ordained in the Anglican Church in 1914 after graduating from Durham with first-class honours. Attending the same September graduation ceremony was the future conductor Malcolm Sargent, there to receive his Music degree.

With the outbreak of the First World War, Raymond immediately applied to the chaplain-general for service overseas with the army. He had an eventful war and served as chaplain to the 10th battalion of the Manchester Regiment (1915–1917), to the 9th battalion of the Worcestershire Regiment (1917 and 1919), to the East Lancashire territorials in Gallipoli in August 1915, and on five other fronts: Sinai, France and Belgium, Mesopotamia, Persia, and Russia.

== Career ==
He resigned Holy Orders in 1923, having published his first novel, Tell England, the previous year. According to Peter Preston, the book received mixed reviews. Its title was a deliberate echo of an epitaph made by Simonides of Ceos after the Battle of Thermopylae, and the sentimental nature of the work made it very popular with the public if not the literary establishment.

He wrote many books, including the novels Damascus Gate (1923), A Chorus Ending (1951), The City and the Dream (1958, which concluded his London Gallery series of novels portraying London life in the first half of the twentieth century), Mr Olim (1961), and The Bethany Road (1967). Other titles include Two Gentlemen of Rome: the Story of Keats and Shelley (1952), and Paris, City of Enchantment (1961). His 1929 play The Berg based on the sinking of the Titanic, was staged in the West End and adapted into the film Atlantic.

Many of his 1930s–1940s novels included clerics, the characters' religious life, and spiritual philosophy. The Autobiography of David (1946) was "as told to" him by the pseudonymous "David" who was an agoraphobiac as well as a convicted sexual exhibitionist who had spent time in a prison institution for the mentally ill.

We, the Accused was made into a well-received TV drama of the same title starring Ian Holm, Angela Down and Elizabeth Spriggs in 1980.

== Assessment ==
George Orwell in 1945 praised Raymond as a "natural novelist" who could portray convincingly the lives of ordinary people. In particular, he admired We, the Accused for its emotional power, while criticising the clumsy and long-winded way in which it is written.

== Personal life ==
Raymond was married twice, firstly in Brighton, 1922 to Zoe Irene Maude Doucett (1897–1964) of Southampton (two children), secondly in Hampstead, 1941 to Diana Joan Young (1916–2009) of Woolwich (one child, Peter John Francis Raymond). From 1941 until his death Raymond resided at 22 The Pryors in Hampstead.

== Bibliography ==
- Tell England: A Study in a Generation (1922)
- Rossenal (1922)
- Damascus Gate (1923)
- The Shout of the King (1924)
- Wanderlight (1924)
- The Fulfilment of Daphne Bruno (1926)
- Morris in the Dance (1927)
- The Old Tree Blossomed (1928)
- Through Literature to Life; An Enthusiasm and an Anthology (1928)
- A Family That Was (1930)
- The Jesting Army (1931)
- Mary Leith (1932)
- Child of Norman's End (1934)
- We, the Accused (1935)
- Don John's Mountain Home (1936)
- The Marsh (1937)
- In the Steps of St. Francis (1939)
- The Miracle of Brean (1939)
- A Song of the Tide (1940)
- The Last to Rest (1941)
- Was there Love Once (1942)
- The Corporal of the Guard (1944)
- For Them That Trespass (1944)
- Back to Humanity (1945)
- The Autobiography of David (1946)
- Five Sons of Le Faber (1946)
- Kilburn Tale (1947)
- In the Steps of the Brontes (1948)
- Gentle Greaves (1949)
- Witness of Canon Welcome (1950)
- A Chorus Ending (1951)
- Chalice and the Sword (1952)
- Two Gentlemen of Rome: The Story of Keats And Shelley (1952)
- The Bronte Legend: Its Cause And Treatment (1953)
- The Nameless Places (1954)
- To the Wood No More (1954)
- Lord of Wensley (1956)
- The Old June Weather (1957)
- The City and the Dream (1958)
- The Quiet Shore (1958)
- The Visit of Brother Ives (1960)
- Mr Olim (1961)
- Paris, City of Enchantment (1961)
- The Chatelaine (1962)
- One of Our Brethren (1963)
- Late in the Day (1964)
- Tree of Heaven (1965)
- The Mountain Farm (1966)
- Bethany Road (1967)
- A Song of the Tide (1967)
- The Story of My Days: An Autobiography 1888–1922 (1968)
- Please You, Draw Near: Autobiography 1922–1968 (1969)
- Gentle Greaves (1970)
- Good Morning, Good People: an autobiography – past and present (1970)
- A Georgian Love Story (1971)
- Our Late Member (1972)
- Miryam's Guest House (1973)
- Under Wedgery Down (1974)
