= Preparatory school (United Kingdom) =

UK schooling level

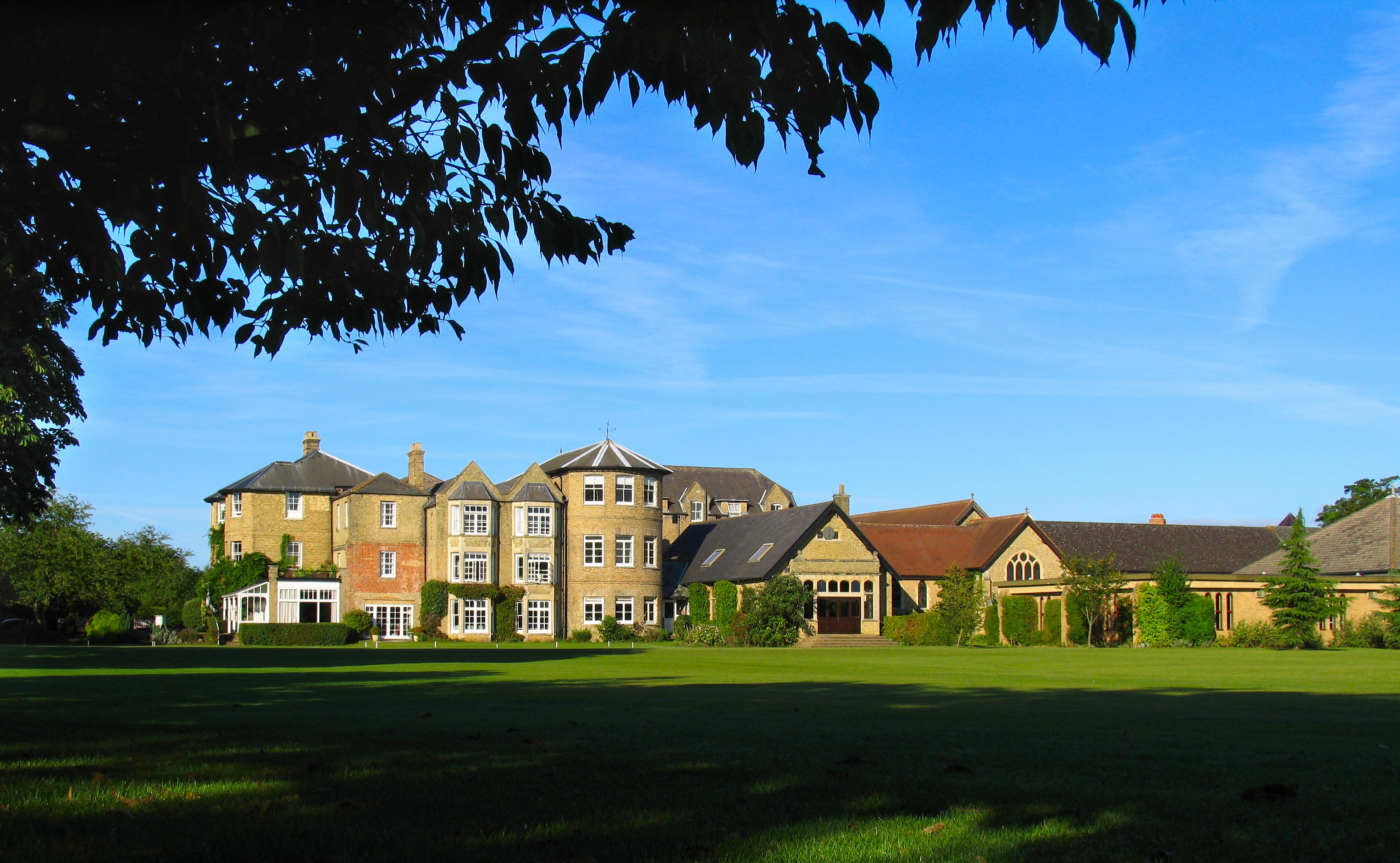
Summer Fields School, a British prep school in Summertown, in Oxford

A preparatory school (or, shortened: prep school) in the United Kingdom is a fee-charging private primary school that caters for children up to approximately the age of 13. The term "preparatory school" is used as it prepares the children for the Common Entrance Examination in order to secure a place at an independent secondary school, typically one of the English public schools. They are also preferred by some parents in the hope of getting their child into a state selective grammar school. Most prep schools are inspected by the Independent Schools Inspectorate, which is overseen by Ofsted on behalf of the Department for Education.

== Overview ==
Boys' prep schools are generally for 8–13 year-olds (Years 3 to 8), who are prepared for the Common Entrance Examination, the key to entry into many secondary independent schools. Before the age of 7 or 8, the term "pre-prep school" is used. Girls' independent schools in England tend to follow the age ranges of state schools more closely than those of boys. Girls' preparatory schools usually admit girls from the age of 4, who will then continue to another independent school at 11 (Year 7), or at 13 (Year 9 if the school is co-educational (as most secondary schools now are). However, as more girls now go on to formerly single-sex boys' schools that have become co-educational, the separation is less clear.

There are 130,000 pupils in over 500 prep schools of all types and sizes. Prep schools may be for boys or girls only, or may be co-educational. They may be day schools, boarding schools, weekly boarding, flexi-boarding, or a combination. They fall into the following general categories:

- Wholly independent prep schools, both charitable and proprietary
- Junior schools linked to senior schools (i.e. primary to secondary)
- Choir schools, which educate child choristers of cathedrals, university colleges, and some other large religious institutions; they all accept non-chorister pupils except for Westminster Abbey Choir School; these schools are usually affiliated to Anglican churches, but may occasionally be associated with the Catholic church such as Westminster Cathedral
- Schools offering special educational provision or facilities
- Schools with particular religious affiliations

The Independent Association of Prep Schools is a prep schools heads association; one of seven affiliated associations of the Independent Schools Council.

== Pre-prep ==
Pre-prep schools are generally associated with prep schools, and take children from reception to Year 3.

== History ==
Prep schools were originally developed in England and Wales in the early 19th century as boarding schools to prepare boys for leading public schools, such as Eton College, Radley College, Harrow School, Charterhouse School, Oundle School, Rugby School, St Paul's School, Westminster School, Tonbridge School and Winchester College. The numbers attending such schools increased as many parents were overseas in the service of the British Empire. Prep schools are now found in all parts of the United Kingdom, and elsewhere.

== In popular culture ==
- Anthony Buckeridge's Jennings series set at "Linbury Court".
- Geoffrey Willans and Ronald Searle's series with the protagonist Nigel Molesworth, set at "St. Custard's".
- Sofia the First is partially set at a magic school named "Royal Prep".

== TV documentaries ==
- The Making of Them (1994), an episode of the documentary series 40 Minutes.
- Leaving Home at 8 (2010), an episode of the documentary series Cutting Edge.
