= Murder Without Crime =

1950 film

- UK theatrical poster
- Directed by: J. Lee Thompson
- Written by: J. Lee Thompson (play and screenplay)
- Produced by: Victor Skutezky
- Starring: Dennis Price; Derek Farr; Patricia Plunkett; Joan Dowling
- Cinematography: William McLeod
- Edited by: Edward B. Jarvis
- Music by: Philip Green
- Production company: ABPC
- Distributed by: Associated British-Pathé
- Release date: October 1950 (UK)
- Running time: 80 minutes
- Country: United Kingdom
- Language: English
- Box office: £83,825 (UK)

Murder Without Crime is a 1950 British crime film directed by J. Lee Thompson (his first film, credited as J. Lee-Thompson) and starring Dennis Price, Derek Farr and Patricia Plunkett. J. Lee Thompson also wrote the screenplay, adapted from his successful West End play of the same title.

== Plot ==
Following a bitter row, writer Stephen Holt (Derek Farr) walks out on his wife Jan (Patricia Plunkett) and goes to drown his sorrows at a nightclub. A drunken Steve ends up returning home with the club's wily hostess, Grena (Joan Dowling). Just then Jan calls, and announces she is returning that night to the flat. Steve attempts to get rid of Grena, but a fight ensues and he believes he has killed her. He quickly hides her body in an ottoman. Downstairs, the suave and sinister landlord Matthew (Dennis Price) hears the disturbance and goes to investigate.

Matthew suspects the edgy Steve is hiding something, and during the night continually taunts his tenant. Stephen eventually confesses, but rather than calling for the police the landlord blackmails his tenant for an extortionate rent, and reveals his long-held affection for his tenant's wife.

== Cast ==
- Dennis Price as Matthew
- Derek Farr as Stephen
- Patricia Plunkett as Jan
- Joan Dowling as Grena

== Original Play ==
Double Error is a 1935 British play by J. Lee Thompson. It had a run in the West End when Thompson was only 18 years old. An article from this time about the play said he had written 40 plays already, including four in between his first two staged plays. The play led to a job offer for Thompson to write scripts, launching his career.

The Daily Mail called it "a gripping thriller". It was filmed as The Price of Folly, released in 1937.

The play was revised and had a run in London as Murder Without Crime in 1942. The New York Times said "the play's quality consists not in its crude and obvious plot but in the character drawing of the sadistic neighbour."

The play was very successful and there was interest in other productions, in part because the play only required four actors and one set. In November 1942 it was optioned by an American producer.

The play had a brief run on Broadway in 1943. It was revived in 1945 with John Carradine. It did not reach New York. Variety reviewing the John Carradine production said "There is much too little in the J. Lee Thompson opus for a satisfactory theatre session. The surprise finish is a good twist for a short short story, and may provide the qualification for an Eric Johnston imprimatur in Hollywood, but the average Broadway-farer will find the device insufficient reward."

The film adaptation began Thompson's career as film director.

== Critical reception ==
Variety said it was "a typical example of a stageplay transferred to the screen without any substantial revision of the script. The film version never breaks out of its original confines and is restricted in space and action... One of the most verbose examples of recent British productions, this is overloaded with precious dialog to fit the suave character played by Dennis Price. But it is completely out of place in a thriller, and draws laughs at the wrong places." In The New York Times Bosley Crowther noted "a harmless, and, for the most part, pleasurable, addition to the horror-with-a-twist genre."

The Los Angeles Times praised its "gripping, dark mood." Britmovie described it as a "slick noirish thriller atmospherically directed by J. Lee Thompson." TV Guide reviewer believed the film "suffers from a stagy presentation that never lets the celluloid medium take over...Thompson is content to present only a visually simplistic recording of the play. The dialog doesn't work well on screen, often drawing unintentional laughs. Despite the film's overriding weaknesses, it was an enormous hit in London's West End."
