= Tim Turner =

English actor (1924–1987)

- Born: John Freeman Turner; 7 September 1924; Bexley, Kent, England
- Died: 1987 (aged 62–63); Spain
- Occupations: Film, television and stage actor
- Years active: 1940s–1968
- Television: The Invisible Man (1958–59)
- Spouse(s): Patricia Plunkett (m. 1951; died 1974) Mercia Dunkley

John Freeman Turner, known by the stage name Tim Turner (7 September 1924 – 1987), was an English actor who performed during the 1950s and 1960s.

== Life and career ==
Turner was born in Bexley, Kent. Before becoming a film and television actor, Turner was a popular leading young man in the theatre. One of his roles was as the love interest of Stella Linden's Sadie Thompson in the 1949 tour of Rain, adapted from the short story by W. Somerset Maugham.

Uncredited, Turner provided the voice of the title character in the TV series The Invisible Man (1958–59), a loose adaptation of the 1897 novel by H. G. Wells. He appeared in person in one episode as a foreign-accented villain. Later, Turner dubbed the voice of actor Todd Armstrong for the 1963 film Jason and the Argonauts.

Between 1959 and 1963, Turner narrated most of the Look at Life series of short documentary films produced by the Rank Organisation.

He was married to actress Patricia Plunkett from 1951 until her death in 1974. He later married in Gibraltar to Mercia Dunkley. Turner died in Spain in 1987.

== Filmography ==
Year	Title	Role	Notes
1952	Gift Horse	Crewman	Uncredited
1952	Top Secret	1st Reporter	
1952	Moulin Rouge	Artist	Uncredited
1952	Hindle Wakes	Tommy Dykes	
1953	The Red Beret	Rupert	
1954	Mask of Dust	Alvarez	
1954	Night of the Silvery Moon	George	
1954	Companions in Crime	Philip Marsden	
1955	Police Dog	Frank Mason	
1955	The Dam Busters	Lieutenant J. F. Leggo	
1956	A Town Like Alice	British Sergeant	
1958	Dunkirk	Officer	Uncredited
1958	A Tale of Two Cities	Charles Darnay	Voice
1958	A Night to Remember	Third Officer Charles Groves	
1958	Grip of the Strangler	Dr. Kenneth McColl	
1959	Operation Amsterdam	Dutch Lieutenant	
1960	Jackpot	Peter	
1960	Not a Hope in Hell	Cy Hallam	
1963	Jason and the Argonauts	Jason	Voice, Uncredited
1964	First Men in the Moon		Voice, Uncredited
1967	The Mummy's Shroud	Narrator	Voice, Uncredited
