= The Quiet Shore =

1958 novel

- First edition (UK)
- Author: Ernest Raymond
- Language: English
- Genre: War drama
- Publisher: Cassell
- Publication date: 1958
- Publication place: United Kingdom
- Media type: Print

The Quiet Shore is 1958 war novel by the British writer Ernest Raymond. It returns to the subject of one of his best-known works Tell England, set during the Gallipoli campaign during the First World War. It addresses the theme of homosexuality which had been a subtext in the earlier novel.

== Synopsis ==
Forty years after the costly landings, Gerry Browning returns to Gallipoli with his wife. While there he relives the terrible experiences and his intense admiration for a fellow officer.

== Bibliography ==
- Greicus, M. S. Prose Writers of World War I. British Council, 1973 .
- Onions, John. English Fiction and Drama of the Great War, 1918–39. Springer, 26 Mar 1990 .
- Paris, Michael. First World War and Popular Cinema: 1914 to the Present. Edinburgh University Press, 2019.
- Schneider, Ralf & Potter, Jane. Handbook of British Literature and Culture of the First World War. Walter de Gruyter, 2021.
