= The Invisible Man (1958 TV series) =

British sci-fi TV series (1958–1959)

- Also known as: H.G. Wells' Invisible Man
- Genre: Science fiction
- Created by: Ralph Smart
- Developed by: Larry White
- Starring: Lisa Daniely; Deborah Watling
- Voices of: Robert Beatty (pilot episode); Tim Turner (series)
- Opening theme: Sydney John Kay
- Composers: Sydney John Kay; Edwin Astley
- Country of origin: United Kingdom
- Original language: English
- No. of series: 2
- No. of episodes: 26, plus unaired pilot (list of episodes)

Production
- Producers: Ralph Smart for ITC
- Cinematography: Wolfgang Suschitzky; Arthur Graham; Bert Mason; Brendan J. Stafford
- Camera setup: Single-camera
- Running time: 25 mins.

Original release
- Network: ITV
- Release: 14 September 1958 – 5 July 1959

The Invisible Man (later known as H.G. Wells' Invisible Man) is a British black-and-white science fiction television series that aired on ITV. It aired from September 1958 to July 1959, on CBS in the United States, two seasons. Of which these shows amounted to twenty-six one-half-hour episodes. This series was loosely inspired by the 1897 novel which was authored by the famous H. G. Wells. This television programme was one of at least four 'Invisible Men' television series. This iteration deviates from the novel making the character's name Dr. Peter Brady. The character remains sane, opposed to a lunatic as in the book or the 1933 film adaptation. No characters from the novel appear in the series.

The series also changed plot items from episode to episode. In earlier episodes, Dr. Brady's clothing becomes invisible if it is of natural fiber and natural material, but synthetic or artificial clothes stay visible. Later episodes assert that only Dr. Brady's original lab clothing is permanently invisible. Also later episodes minimize Dr. Brady's status as a scientist, and refer to him as either Mr. Brady, or just 'Brady' and as 'The Invisible Man'.

== Plot ==
The series follows the adventures of the fictional Dr. Peter Brady. He is a scientist. Dr. Brady experiments with light, and refraction. He attempts to achieve invisibility. He puts a guinea pig into an ionization chamber. The animal begins to fade from sight, Dr. Brady calls his assistant. The experiment goes wrong. There is a bang. Dr. Brady is permanently invisible. Dr. Brady doesn't understand exactly how the process occurs and is unable to duplicate it. The lab decides to lock him in. Invisible, he easily escapes making his way to his sister's house. With his sister, he returns to the laboratory. He is initially declared a state secret. He negotiates his freedom. He negotiates with the lab and the UK government, represented by Sir Charles Anderson, to allow him to return to his laboratory.

Dr. Brady's sister and young niece are main characters in the series. One or both feature in a good number of the Doctor's adventures. His experiments focus on his return to visibility ("Secret Experiment"). British Intelligence recruits him for a top-secret Middle East assignment ("Crisis in the Desert") to rescue an undercover operative. After security is breached in ("Behind the Mask"), his identity is exposed. Soon he becomes a celebrity ("Picnic with Death"). Invisibility now is an avenue by which to help people who are besot with troubled predicaments, solve crimes and defeat enemy spies.

== Cast ==
- The Invisible Man — Himself* (series voice: Tim Turner, uncredited; unaired pilot episode voice: Robert Beatty, uncredited)
- Lisa Daniely as Jane Brady Wilson (unaired pilot episode) / Diane Brady Wilson (series) (Brady's widowed sister)**
- Deborah Watling as Sally Wilson (Diane's daughter)
- Ernest Clark as Sir Charles Anderson (series 1 only) / Colonel Ward (series 2 only)

* This is how the character is credited on the rear sleeve of the Network DVD release. Billed in on-screen closing credits as simply The Invisible Man, with no actor's name listed. Michael Goodliffe, who plays the criminal scientist Crompton in the first story, is credited in the original release promotional documentation.
** In the unaired pilot episode The Invisible Man, the character's first name was Jane, but this was changed to Diane — or "Dee", as Brady himself usually refers to her — for the series.

== Production ==
The pilot, which bears the on-screen episode title "The Invisible Man" (but is often wrongly referred to as "Secret Experiment"), was never aired. Canadian actor Robert Beatty provided the voice of Dr. Peter Brady. After Ralph Smart, the creator, saw the pilot, he realised that he could not use it. The bandaged hero could be seen bumping into doors and scenery, the strings which animated moving objects could be seen in a number of scenes. Despite that this Invisible Man was never transmitted, plot elements and footage from it were reused in the episodes "Secret Experiment", "Picnic with Death" and "Bank Raid". The Invisible Man pilot is included in its entirety on the Network DVD release of the series. Note: Series originally started filming in 1957.

A second pilot episode titled "Secret Experiment" was made, and was used as the opening installment of the series. This featured Dr. Peter Brady (who is only ever seen obliquely), who is unwittingly subjected to radiation and turns invisible. While Brady searches for a cure to restore himself to normal, he also acts as an agent for the British Intelligence services. The original ITC press book states that "Secret Experiment", the second episode "The Locked Room", the fourth episode "Crisis in the Desert" and the fifth episode "Picnic with Death" should be shown first by any TV company; however, this directive was ignored by UK and US broadcasters leading to episodes in which Brady's invisibility is known about by the public, such as "Behind the Mask", being screened before its reveal in the episode "Picnic with Death". In these earlier episodes, the public does not know that Brady is invisible, and he wears bandages and sunglasses (as well as gloves) when he appears in public, but the episode "Behind the Mask" has a foreign industrialist with influence who tricks Brady into making him invisible too in an attempt to assassinate his country's new ruler. Subsequently, in "Picnic with Death", a motoring accident fully exposes Brady's invisibility, to the point that he is besieged by the Press. The same bandages Brady uses when out in public help fugitive convict Joe Green (played by Dermot Walsh) in the episode "Jailbreak" to escape the police when they thought he was Brady.

As a publicity gimmick, the actor playing the Invisible Man himself was never credited, either on-screen or in TVTimes, but Johnny Scripps played Brady without the bandages, i.e. apparently headless but otherwise dressed. Being a little person, he was able to see through the buttonholes in Brady's coat. Tim Turner provided Brady's voice, also without on-screen credit, using a transatlantic accent in order to help ITC sell the series to the United States.

The various 'actors' playing Brady's body remain unknown to this day, apart from Tim Turner whose identity was revealed in 1965 (the series was still being repeated regularly up until 1966). In later episodes, Tim Turner both played and voiced Brady — as press cast list handouts from 1959 clearly show. A number of different 'actors' portrayed Brady throughout the earlier episodes, particularly noticeable in the episode "Play to Kill" where a slim Brady is seen in studio scenes but changes into a stocky version on location. Although according to Lisa Daniely: "I can't remember his name, and he wasn't really a very good actor. And they used somebody else's voice; that was the final insult — poor man. He was quite a nice looking bloke, but not a very dynamic personality."

Tim Turner himself appeared visibly in the "Man in Disguise" episode, though on this occasion he played Nick, a foreign-accented villain who impersonates Brady. Among the writers recruited for the show were Ian Stuart Black, Michael Pertwee and Brian Clemens under the pseudonym Tony O'Grady. Puppeteer Jack Whitehead, who had earlier worked on Muffin the Mule, was called in to provide the brilliant special effects of the show – such as cigarettes smoking while hanging in the air and wine being drunk by an invisible drinker (The pilot episode credits "Trick Photography" by Victor Margutti).

Stuntmen risked their lives hiding in the bottom of cars, driving the vehicle while looking from a slightly open door, or in the steering of a motorbike from a sidecar, which caused members of the public to try and stop what they thought was a runaway vehicle; they didn't realise there was actually a stuntman concealed in the sidecar, steering the motorbike with duplicate controls.

On another occasion, a motorist was surprised to see a car without a driver pull up at traffic lights alongside him. A man then rushed across to the apparently empty car, pulled open the door, and then recoiled from an invisible blow. The motorist didn't know that there was a film unit present, and the man thrown back from the driverless car was actually an actor. Fortunately, the motorist was felt not to have spoilt the take, but rather had helped it — his look of astonishment at what he had witnessed was so well displayed that he was kept in the finished scene.

In the second series, the camera often took on Brady's point of view, i.e. showing whoever and/or whatever the character himself was seeing at the time, which meant that the need for special effects could be cut down.

It has since come to light that two other actors played the voice of Peter Brady after Robert Beatty and before Tim Turner. Because Beatty's Canadian accent in The Invisible Man pilot was considered too harsh, "Secret Experiment" featured the softer accent of fellow Canadian actor Lee Patterson. Unfortunately, when the series was commissioned and went into production, Patterson was found to be committed workwise and so his place was taken by another Canadian actor, Paul Carpenter, a former band singer and B-feature leading man.

The first series was script edited by Victor Wolfson, for the second series Ian Stuart Black took over, having written scripts for the first series. The music for the pilot was composed by Sydney John Kay, and he is credited as the musical director for series one. Assistant directors on series one were Jack Drury (2 episodes), Peter Crowhurst (2 episodes) and David Tomblin, who also worked on all series two episodes and the pilot. Casting director Harry Fine and sound supervisor Fred Turtle also worked on both series

Guest stars included Peter Sallis, Leslie Phillips, Irene Handl, Honor Blackman, Patrick Troughton, Dennis Price, Dermot Walsh, Willoughby Goddard and Ian Hendry.

== Episode list ==
Airdates given here are for ATV London. Other ITV regions varied airdates and transmission order.

Note: The actors who provided the Voice of Peter Brady are listed only once until they change.

=== Pilot episode ===
No.	Title	Directed by	Written by	Original release date
0	"The Invisible Man"	Ralph Smart	Doreen Montgomery and Ralph Smart	Unaired
Experimenting on making guinea pigs invisible by lowering their refractive index to that of air, Dr. Peter Brady becomes invisible himself after a radioactive leak. Brady becomes front page news and a target for a ruthless criminal gang who kidnap Sally, forcing Brady to use his invisibility to steal £50,000 from a bank in order to pay the ransom for her safe return. Stars Willoughby Goddard, Brian Rawlinson (Voice of Peter Brady: Robert Beatty) (Plot elements and footage from this episode were later reused in Secret Experiment, Picnic with Death and Bank Raid. The episode also includes footage from the 1956 film Quatermass 2. This episode is included at the end of DVD 1.)

=== Series One ===
No. overall	No. in series	Title	Directed by	Written by	Original release date
1	1	"Secret Experiment"	Pennington Richards	Michael Connor and Michael Cramoy	14 September 1958
Experimenting on making guinea pigs invisible by lowering their refractive index to that of air, Dr Peter Brady becomes invisible himself after a radioactive leak. Brady becomes an official secret and seeks help from fellow scientist, Crompton, to make him visible again, but Crompton sees the advantages of invisibility and steals Brady's notes. Stars Lisa Daniely, Deborah Watling, Lloyd Lamble, Bruce Seton, Ernest Clark, Michael Goodliffe, voice of Peter Brady: Lee Patterson. (This episode includes footage from the 1956 film Quatermass 2.)
2	2	"Crisis in the Desert"	Pennington Richards	Ralph Smart	21 September 1958
Brady is asked to rescue a British agent who has been captured by Colonel Omar and his soldiers in the Middle East. With the help of local resistance fighter Yolanda, Brady plans to rescue the agent from a high-security hospital before he reveals this knowledge to Omar. Stars Douglas Wilmer, Eric Pohlmann, Martin Benson, Peter Sallis, Adrienne Corri, Derren Nesbitt (Voice of Peter Brady: Paul Carpenter)
3	3	"Behind the Mask"	Pennington Richards	Stanley Mann and Leslie Arliss, story by Stanley Mann	28 September 1958
Hideously disfigured millionaire Raphael Constantine volunteers to be a guinea pig for Brady's experiments, to which Brady agrees. Unknown to Brady, Constantine has an ulterior motive which could be deadly to the visiting president Domecq. Stars Dennis Price, Edwin Richfield
4	4	"The Locked Room"	Pennington Richards	Lindsay Galloway, story by Ralph Smart	5 October 1958
Tania, a Russian scientist working in London, criticises her government and is abducted. Brady comes to her aid, believing she can help him to become visible again. Stars Zena Marshall, Rupert Davies, Noel Coleman
5	5	"Picnic with Death"	Pennington Richards	Leonard Fincham and Leslie Arliss, story by Leonard Fincham	12 October 1958
One of Sally's friends is afraid her mother is going to be murdered by her stepfather and his sister, and Sally asks her Uncle Peter to use his invisibility to save her. Stars Derek Bond, Faith Brook, Michael Ripper. (Voice of Peter Brady: Tim Turner)
6	6	"Play to Kill"	Peter Maxwell	Leslie Arliss, story by Robert Westerby	19 October 1958
Brady tries to prove actress Barbara Crane did not accidentally run down and kill a tramp – for which she is being blackmailed – when even she believes she did. Stars Helen Cherry, Colin Gordon, Hugh Latimer, Ballard Berkeley.
7	7	"Shadow on the Screen"	Pennington Richards	Ian Stuart Black, story by Ralph Smart and Philip Levene	26 October 1958
Brady goes aboard an Iron Curtain ship in the London docks to rescue a prisoner, but discovers it is a trap using a form of radar to catch him and his secret of invisibility. Stars Edward Judd, Greta Gynt, Irene Handl.
8	8	"The Mink Coat"	Pennington Richards	Ian Stuart Black, story by Leonore Coffee	2 November 1958
Unknown to puppeteer Penny Page, the mink coat she is wearing on a plane to Paris contains smuggled microfilm of atomic research papers. Fellow passenger Peter Brady becomes involved in the intrigue. Stars Hazel Court, Derek Godfrey, Joan Hickson, Oliver Reed.(uncredited)
9	9	"Blind Justice"	Pennington Richards	Ralph Smart	9 November 1958
When Brady's friend Arthur Holt is accused of drug smuggling and is nearly killed by the gang responsible in front of his blind wife Katherine, he becomes the woman's eyes to break the smuggling ring. Stars Honor Blackman, Jack Watling, Philip Friend, Leslie Phillips, Julian Somers, Desmond Llewelyn
10	10	"Jailbreak"	Pennington Richards	Ian Stuart Black	16 November 1958
Convinced Joe Green, who has been convicted of armed robbery, is innocent, Brady searches for a girl who can provide an alibi. Stars Dermot Walsh, Maurice Kaufmann, Ronald Fraser and Ralph Michael.
11	11	"Bank Raid"	Ralph Smart	Doreen Montgomery and Ralph Smart	23 November 1958
When Sally is taken from school by a gang of ruthless criminals, Brady is forced to rob a bank to pay a £50,000 ransom for her safe return. Stars Willoughby Goddard, Brian Rawlinson, Patricia Marmont
12	12	"Odds Against Death"	Pennington Richards	Ian Stuart Black, from a story idea by Stanley Mann	30 November 1958
To save the daughter of Professor Owens, a brilliant scientist, from danger, Brady uses his invisibility to manipulate the casino tables in Italy in Owens's favour. But little does Owens know that he is gambling his daughter's life away. Stars Walter Fitzgerald, Julia Lockwood, Alan Tilvern, Olaf Pooley, Oliver Reed.(uncredited)
13	13	"Strange Partners"	Pennington Richards	Michael Cramoy	7 December 1958
After his briefcase of scientific documents is stolen, Brady is held prisoner by the man responsible, Lucian Currie, who wants him to kill his partner Vickers. The Invisible Man discovers that although his invisibility is a defence against detection from humans, it is no protection against a vicious guard dog trained to hunt him down if he attempts to escape. Stars Griffith Jones, Jack Melford, Patrick Troughton.

=== Series Two ===
No. overall	No. in series	Title	Directed by	Written by	Original release date
14	1	"Point of Destruction"	Quentin Lawrence	Ian Stuart Black	12 April 1959
When four test pilots die while testing a top secret fuel diffuser, Brady investigates as to whether it is sabotage. Stars Duncan Lamont, Patricia Jessel, Derren Nesbitt, Barry Letts
15	2	"Death Cell"	Peter Maxwell	Michael Cramoy	19 April 1959
Ellen Summers escapes from a mental institution and pleads with Brady to save her fiancée who is awaiting execution in a cell for killing a police inspector. Stars Lana Morris, Ian Wallace, William Lucas.
16	3	"The Vanishing Evidence"	Peter Maxwell	Ian Stuart Black	26 April 1959
When international spy Peter Thal murders Professor Harper and steals vital secrets on which he had been working, Brady is called in by Colonel Ward for help in following Thal to Holland. Stars James Raglan, Charles Gray, Ernest Clark, Michael Ripper.
17	4	"The Prize"	Quentin Lawrence	Ian Stuart Black	3 May 1959
Brady arrives in Scandinavia to collect a prize for his contribution to science. However, he ends up crossing the border to help save Soviet writer Tania Roskoff, who has been arrested while crossing the border. Stars Mai Zetterling, Anton Diffring, Tony Church
18	5	"Flight into Darkness"	Peter Maxwell	Ian Stuart Black, story by William H. Altman	10 May 1959
Dr. Stephens believes that his discovery in the field of anti-gravity will endanger mankind, and so destroys all his papers and disappears. Brady is asked by Stephens' daughter to track him down. Stars Geoffrey Keen, John Harvey, Colin Douglas, Michael Shepley, Joanna Dunham, Esmond Knight.
19	6	"The Decoy"	Quentin Lawrence	Brenda Blackmore	17 May 1959
Identical twins Toni and Terry Trent are a popular musical act, performing for the troops on a USO tour of Britain. Brady volunteers to help Toni when Terry disappears at a Soho hotel where she had earlier witnessed a murder. Stars Betta St. John as Toni Trent/Terry Trent, Wolfe Morris
20	7	"The Gun Runners"	Peter Maxwell	Ian Stuart Black	24 May 1959
After a family is gunned down in a market in the small Mediterranean state of Bay Akim, the British Government ask Brady to travel there and help gun inspector Zena Fleming discover who is supplying the guns. Stars Louise Allbritton, Bruce Seton, Paul Stassino
21	8	"The White Rabbit"	Quentin Lawrence	Ian Stuart Black	31 May 1959
Brady travels to France when a young doctor, Suzanne Dumasse, sees a white rabbit materialise out of thin air, and her evidence points to a Fascist plot to use the discovery of invisibility to launch a revolt. Stars Marla Landi, Austin Trevor, Paul Daneman, Keith Pyott, Reed De Rouen
22	9	"Man in Disguise"	Quentin Lawrence and Peter Maxwell	Brenda Blackmore, story by Leslie Arliss	7 June 1959
Brady finds himself involved in an international drugs racket when a beautiful girl called Madeleine steals his passport in Paris, enabling her accomplice Nick to impersonate Brady and smuggle dope into England. Stars Tim Turner as Voice of Peter Brady/Nick, Lee Montague, Robert Raglan, Robert Rietti
23	10	"Man in Power"	Peter Maxwell	Ian Stuart Black	14 June 1959
Brady helps the brother and sister of a Middle East king – who has been murdered by his power-crazy army chief – to regain their father's throne. Stars Vivian Matalon, Gary Raymond, André Morell, Andrew Keir
24	11	"The Rocket"	Quentin Lawrence	Michael Pertwee	21 June 1959
The transporting of a top-secret rocket is compromised when the transport officer, Ronald Smith, runs into gambling debts and agrees to give a criminal gang information about the rocket. When it is hijacked by the criminals, Brady starts a desperate search for the missing rocket. Stars Glyn Owen, Russell Waters, Robert Brown
25	12	"Shadow Bomb"	Peter Maxwell	Tony O'Grady and Ian Stuart Black, story by Tony O'Grady	28 June 1959
Captain Finch is trapped in a pit with an experimental bomb detonator – invented by Brady – that has been designed to explode a bomb instantly if a shadow falls across the device. Only Brady can enter the pit to deactivate the detonator before the sun casts a shadow over the bomb. Stars Conrad Phillips, Jennifer Jayne, Anthony Bushell, Walter Gotell, Ian Hendry
26	13	"The Big Plot"	Peter Maxwell	Ian Stuart Black, story by Tony O'Grady and Robert Smart	5 July 1959
When a plane crash with no survivors reveals that someone aboard was smuggling into England a canister of Uranium 235, used in the manufacture of atomic weapons, Brady uncovers a plot to start a Third World War. Stars William Squire, Barbara Shelley, John Arnatt, Edward Hardwicke, Derrick Sherwin

First series episodes are copyright Incorporated Television Programme Co. Ltd, second series episodes are copyright Official Films Inc.

Apart from ATV London, other UK Networks – such as ABC Weekend Television – screened the series as one 26-episode run between 13 June 1959 and 19 December 1959, Tyne-Tees Television screened the series from its opening night on 15 January 1959.

== Home media ==
MPI Home Video has released the entire series on DVD in North America. The discs are in NTSC format and carry no region encoding. They are available in two double-disc sets, or as a complete, four-disc set.

DVD name	Ep#	Release date
Season One	13	28 March 2006
Season Two	13	25 July 2006
The Complete Series	26	26 February 2008

Network released the entire series in the UK as a four-disc DVD set using new prints made from the original negatives. The discs are in PAL format and are encoded for Region 2.

Label: Network
Release Date: 2008
Catalogue N°: 7952963
Availability: Out now

=== Special features ===
- Audio commentaries on Secret Experiment, Picnic With Death featuring Lisa Daniely, Deborah Watling, and Shadow Bomb featuring Brian Clemens and Ray Austin
- The unscreened pilot version
- Mute Italian Opening/closing titles
- Image Gallery
- ATV Star Book PDFs (DVD-Rom only. PC/Mac)

== Sources ==
- Roger Fulton, The Encyclopedia of TV Science Fiction, Boxtree, Ltd., 1997 (Revised edition), pp. 199–204.
- Andrew Pixley, Timescreen magazine number 13/Spring 1989, pages 15 – 23.

== Other media ==
- In Alan Moore's The League of Extraordinary Gentlemen: Black Dossier, Peter Brady was one of the members of the failed 1950s League in the fictional The League of Extraordinary Gentlemen universe. Brady recreated Hawley Griffin's original notebooks and successfully achieved invisibility, but was not very impressive as a spy due to smoking-related coughing fits, which revealed his invisible presence.
