= We, the Accused (TV series) =

British television series

- Genre: Crime drama
- Based on: We, the Accused by Ernest Raymond
- Written by: Julia Jones
- Directed by: Richard Stroud
- Starring: Ian Holm; Angela Down; Iain Cuthbertson
- Composer: Daryl Runswick
- Country of origin: United Kingdom
- Original language: English
- No. of series: 1
- No. of episodes: 5

Production
- Producer: Jonathan Powell
- Cinematography: Ken Westbury
- Running time: 60 minutes

Original release
- Network: BBC 2
- Release: 10 September – 8 November 1980

We, the Accused is a British period crime drama television series that originally aired on BBC 2 in 5 episodes between 10 September and 8 October 1980. It is an adaptation of the 1935 novel of the same title by Ernest Raymond, itself inspired by the Doctor Crippen case.

== Main cast ==
- Ian Holm as Paul Pressett
- Angela Down as Myra Bawne
- Iain Cuthbertson as Chief Inspector Boltro
- Hugh Thomas as Detective Sergeant Doyle
- Christopher Benjamin as Inglewood
- Brenda Cowling as Mrs Briscoll
- Frank Gatliff as Doctor Waterhall
- Betty Hardy as Jane Presset
- David Lodge as Briscoll
- Julia McCarthy as Bessie Furle
- Alan Webb as Aubrey Presset
- Elizabeth Spriggs as Eleanor Presset
- Tony Brooks as Reporter
- Debbie Farrington as Annie Mavis
- Edmund Kente as Worksop
- Nichola McAuliffe as Lily Worksop
- Charles Gray as Sir Hayman Drewer
- Ysanne Churchman as Edith Hanks
- Derek Farr as Sir Kenneth Eddy
- Annie Hulley as Sarah
- Norman Mitchell as Crompton
- Ralph Nossek as Superintendent Kerslake
- Philip Stone as Reverend Hanks
- Michael Troughton as Mr Cullingford
- Ruth Trouncer as Lady Drewer
- John Woodnutt as Inspector Yatt

== Bibliography ==
- Baskin, Ellen . Serials on British Television, 1950-1994. Scolar Press, 1996.
