= Jennings (novel series) =

Series of children's novels

Dust jacket from the 1951 Collins hardback edition of Jennings Follows a Clue

The Jennings series is a collection of novels written by Anthony Buckeridge (1912–2004) as children's literature about the humorous escapades of J. C. T. Jennings, a schoolboy at Linbury Court preparatory school, located near the fictional town of Dunhambury in Sussex, England. There are 24 novels in the series, excluding reprints and other material. The first of the series, Jennings Goes to School, appeared in 1950, and new titles were published regularly until the mid-1970s (including Jennings at Large, published in 1977, the only novel to feature Jennings during the school holidays). The two final volumes were published in the 1990s: Jennings Again in 1991, and That's Jennings in 1994. The characters were originally created for radio and appeared in a regular series on Children's Hour from the late 1940s.

The first ten novels in the series were reprinted in the UK in paperback, by Armada Books, in the late 1960s; and many of the novels were translated from the original English into foreign languages.

== Style ==
Much of the humour rests on misunderstandings attributable to Jennings's literal-mindedness and impetuosity. In the earliest novels in the series there are some Latin puns (typically omitted from later reprints), but Buckeridge discontinued these, apparently to maximise their appeal. The earlier novels present an idealised version of rural or small-town, middle-class English life in the years between the Second World War and the social revolution of the 1960s; the later ones are still rooted in this era (as Buckeridge admitted) but reflect the changing times surprisingly well. Unlike many of his fans, Buckeridge tended to prefer his later books to his earlier ones, possibly because he was a man of the Left and had more positive political memories of the post-1964 period; when the books were reprinted in paperback in the late 1980s, he chose some of the later books for early publication ahead of those originally written in the 1950s.

The stories invented some vernacular language for the boys to use. In particular they coined the word "ozard". The post-war slang "wizard" generally meant "good" or "very good". "Ozard" derives from "Wizard of Oz" and was used to describe anything the boys disliked or dreaded. It was also used to describe the anger of Mr. Wilkins, which could be "ozard", "ozard squared" and occasionally "ozard cubed".

== Characters ==
- J. C. T. (John Christopher Timothy) Jennings – son of a businessman whose home is at Haywards Heath in the stockbroker belt. He is good-natured and well-meaning, but his tendency to act on impulse results in him frequently getting into trouble. Buckeridge told BBC reporter Michael Crick that the fictional Jennings had been modelled on a schoolfriend, Diarmaid Jennings (1913–2009).
- C. E. J. (Charles Edwin Jeremy) Darbishire – mild-mannered and short-sighted, the son of a clergyman, the Reverend Percival Darbishire, from whom he has inherited a habit of sententiously citing proverbs (generally prefixed with "My father says..."). Darbishire is Jennings's right-hand man. Inherently more cautious than his best friend, he usually finds himself drawn into situations in which he would rather not be involved.
- Venables, Atkinson, Temple, Bromwich (Major) – all are classmates of Jennings in Form 3, and fellow boarders, who share Dormitory 4 with Jennings and Darbishire. Temple's nickname was Bod, by a tortuous schoolboy logic involving his initials: CAT (Charles A Temple), was changed to DOG, then amended to 'Dogsbody', which was finally shortened to 'Bod'.
- Pettigrew, Marshall – day boys in Jennings' form, whose privileges Jennings frequently "borrows" in order to assist him in bending school rules.
- Binns Minor, Blotwell – shrill-voiced first-formers who are treated with the condescension appropriate to their junior years by Jennings and his contemporaries.
- Mr L. P. (Lancelot Phineas) Wilkins (Old Wilkie) – Jennings's form master, a man of limited patience and a volcanic temperament, redeemed by a hidden heart of gold at least once in every book. His catchphrases, both of them frequently uttered in order to express his anger and frustration at the boys' antics, are, "Doh! You silly little boy!" and "...I - I - Corwumph!"
- Mr Michael Carter – Jennings's housemaster, a friendly man of great imperturbability and patience, with a phenomenal and unfortunate ability to detect dissembling and violations of school rules. Nicknamed "Benedick", from his use of the Latin phrase Benedicto benedicatur (Let praise be given to the Blessed One; the second word sounding like "Benedick Carter"). This character was said by Buckeridge to be based on himself. Mr Carter is frequently obliged to reassure the less-understanding Old Wilkie that the boys' behaviour is not generally quite as outlandish as the latter thinks - his statement at the end of Jennings in Particular sums it up quite appropriately: "Don't worry, Wilkins. Even third-formers grow up to be people".
- Mr M. W. B. (Martin Winthrop Barlow) Pemberton-Oakes (The Archbeako) – the headmaster, a classical scholar with a capacity to command immediate discipline and frequently long-winded in his speeches, although he generally remains reserved and softly spoken, and never hesitates to deliver praise when it is due.
- Mr Hind – Music master, mild of manner (though occasionally acerbic), trailing clouds of smoke from his cherrywood pipe – also teaches art to Form 1.
- Mr Topliss – teaches shooting once a week on a shooting range behind the gymnasium.
- Matron – the school matron: she is sympathetic and understanding, but, like Mr Carter, has a keen ability to spot malingerers. She appears from Jennings' Little Hut onwards. Her predecessor, who features most prominently in Jennings Goes To School, is also kind-hearted, but less popular with the boys, as she is rather more brisk and no-nonsense in her approach and has, in Buckeridge's words, 'little sympathy with junk-filled pockets and hair that will not stay parted'.
- Miss Angela Birkenshaw (Aunt Angela) – Jennings's absent-minded but generous aunt, who sometimes comes to visit Jennings on half-term holidays. In the book Jennings at Large, she is revealed to be a social worker.

Most of the first names of characters have been revealed (John Christopher Timothy Jennings; Charles Edwin Jeremy Darbishire; Graham Venables; Robin Atkinson; Charles Temple, etc.), but true to the form of British boarding schools, they generally are known exclusively by their surnames. Similarly, the masters generally address one another by their surnames.

Minor recurring characters:

- Hawkins (Old Nightie) – the night watchman.
- Robinson (Old Pyjamas/Old Robbo) – the oddjob man. His nickname is obviously a pun on the nightwatchman's nickname of Old Nightie (a shortening of nightgown).
- Lieutenant General Sir Melville Merridew DSO MC Bart – retired general, the school's most distinguished alumnus, and frequent bestower of half-holidays.
- Miss Thorpe – tireless voluntary charitable worker within the Linbury community.
- PC Herbert Honeyball – Linbury's gruff but kind-hearted village policeman, who has more than once had wearying encounters with Jennings and his classmates.
- Mr and Mrs Lumley – She runs the local cafe and is renowned for her excellent cakes and doughnuts, while her husband is less renowned as a repairer of bicycles. Noted for the sign outside the shop: "Home-made cakes and bicycles repaired".
- Mr Herbert Higgins – mild-mannered local jeweller and watch-mender.
- Farmer Jim and Mrs Arrowsmith – owners of a farm adjoining the school grounds. Both are generally easy-going and supportive of the school's activities, but do occasionally get annoyed when their lives are adversely affected by the boys' antics.
- Dr Basil Featherstonehaugh Hipkin – an absent-minded zoologist who meets Jennings and Darbishire when they accidentally push him into the river while they are on an illicit boating expedition.
- Mrs Amanda Hipkin – Dr Hipkin's formidable but kind-hearted wife.
- Miss Margaret Wilkins – Old Wilkie's pleasant and attractive younger sister, a London-based nurse, who occasionally visits her brother and nearly always has him wrapped round her little finger, especially when she needs him to look after her Siamese kitten, Pyewacket.
- Mr Arthur Jennings – Jennings's kindly and jovial uncle, who appears in 'Our Friend Jennings' and treats both Jennings and Darbishire to a memorable meal involving lots of baked beans in between courses, but is unfortunately too busy to stay long beyond that.
- George the Third – Matron's cat, a large ginger tom.
- Mrs Caffey – Linbury Court's housekeeper; pronounced Café, hence nicknamed "Mother Snackbar".
- Mrs Connie Hackett – the school's feisty part-time kitchen assistant.
- Mr 'Pinky' Parkinson – mild-mannered sports teacher at the nearby Bracebridge School; Linbury Court frequently play Bracebridge in football matches.
- Mr 'Foxy Type' Fox – a notoriously strict and hatchet-faced teacher, who is also at Bracebridge.

== List of novels ==
#	Title	Date	Summary	Notes
1	Jennings Goes to School	1950	Jennings's first term at Linbury Court. He befriends Darbishire, sneaks into town in disguise, accidentally kicks the Archbeako on the kneecap while practising his football-skills, displays too much (or not enough) initiative during fire practice, and has a hair-raising incident with a poisonous spider.	Excerpts have been recorded by Stephen Fry for BBC7 as five 15-minute readings. It is available as an MP3 download. Dedication: "To Jennifer Sally"
2	Jennings Follows a Clue	1951	Jennings founds the Linbury Court Detective Agency, tracks a suspected burglar to his thieves' kitchen, sees mysterious lights in the sanatorium, and solves the burglary of the trophies from the library on Sports Day.	Dedication: "To Timothy John"
3	Jennings' Little Hut	1951	Jennings and Darbishire build a hut by the pond in the grounds (as do all their friends), take a goldfish for a walk in the swimming pool and have a trying afternoon with a pane of glass. Jennings falls into the pond while he, Darbishire, Temple and Venables are sailing their home-made yacht 'The Revenge' on an illicit Sunday visit to said pond - and this, together with the small matter of Jennings and Darbishire's hut collapsing on the visiting Archbeako, leads to a temporary ban on hut-building. Darbishire makes his one and only appearance in an inter-house cricket match and makes a memorable last wicket stand.	Recorded by Mark Williams for Radio 4. Dedication: "To G.A.B."
4	Jennings and Darbishire	1952	Jennings and Darbishire set up their own newspaper, the Form Three Times, have a confusing chat with some French sailors, accidentally set a photography developing dish on fire, try a spot of fishing - down Old Wilkie's chimney - and get lost in the environs of Pottlewhistle Halt. Old Wilkie's sister comes to their rescue when Venables makes a ghastly bish, and gives them a scoop about Old Wilkie's sporting past.	Dedication: "To M.J.S."
5	Jennings' Diary	1953	Jennings undertakes to keep a diary for the year: it records his attempts to start a Form 3 museum, to find the missing link, and to uncover a genuine Roman fake – which doesn't go down too well with the curator of the Dunhambury Museum or Old Wilkie.	Released as an Audiobook by Post Hypnotic Press, narrated by Simon Vance, in 2011 Dedication: "For Martin"
6	According to Jennings	1954	A space-age craze hits Linbury Court leading to an unfortunate incident with a glass dome, an even more unfortunate incident with General Sir Melville Merridew, and a memorable visit to Dunhambury Cricket Ground. Rumours that Old Wilkie is leaving lead to the ringing out of a wild bell.	Released as an Audiobook by Post Hypnotic Press, narrated by Simon Vance, in 2011 Dedication: "To David Davis, whose keen understanding of the youthful mind brings the characters of Linbury Court School to life so vividly on the air"
7	Our Friend Jennings	1955	Jennings and Darbishire go for a cross-country run on a bus, spend an afternoon trying the patience of the patrons of the local cinema and manage to flash unintentional SOS signals in the dorms after getting locked in the boiler-room following an abortive attempt to roast chestnuts on the fire down there. Attempts to stage their masterpiece The Miser's Secret (starring Venables as Mr 'Hem Hem' Brown) are doomed to failure, but instead they perform part of Henry V with an unexpected guest.	Dedication: "To Geoffrey Wincott, whose skilful portrayal of Mr. Carter in 'Jennings at School' has delighted so many listeners to Children's Hour"
8	Thanks To Jennings	1957	Darbishire patents his method of removing heads from park railings with the aid of Jack Carr's car jack. Jennings finds and loses FJ Saunders, Atkinson's guinea pig; uncovers a case of suspected furtive feasting amongst the masters; and saves the day when a Ministry of Schools inspector visits Old Wilkie's history class.	Dedication: "To Wilfred Babbage, who has earned the thanks and esteem of so many listeners to Children's Hour by his inimitable performance as Mr. Wilkins in 'Jennings at School'"
9	Take Jennings, for Instance	1958	Aunt Angela gives Jennings a bicycle, which leads to a chain of events involving a runaway boat, PC Honeyball, and the Spanish Armada. The Form 3 Natural History Club (Jennings, JCT, Chief Spotter, Frog and Tadpole Dept) threatens to disrupt the smooth running of Linbury Court but its activities are saved by the intervention of a scientific frogman on prizegiving day.	Dedication: "To The 'Jennings Club' of Warden House School"
10	Jennings, as Usual	1959	In the Christmas term, Jennings has a short-lived and disastrous promotion to dorm monitor, sets his rubber alight in the classroom, risks Old Wilkie's wrath by drawing an unflattering caricature of him, and improves his piano playing with the aid of a gramophone record, before exchanging gifts and the comps of the season with Old Wilkie at the end-of-term party.	Released as an Audiobook by Post Hypnotic Press, narrated by Simon Vance, in 2011 Uniquely in the series, Jennings, as Usual contains no action away from the school premises, nor has any reference to any person or place other than school staff, pupils or locations. Dedication: "For Geoffrey Anderson"
11	The Trouble With Jennings	1960	Jennings's resolution to be decent to old people like the masters goes awry when he floods the bathroom with a syphon, impersonates Lady Macbeth sleepwalking, and inadvertently causes a fire drill after lights out. But all is resolved at a triumphant Old People's At Home (RIP) in the tuck box room, with some help from Mr Carter and Old Wilkie. Meanwhile, Darbishire has some problems of his own, firstly when Mr Hind chooses him to play a recorder solo at the school concert. Darbishire duly practises his fingering-technique on his toothbrush - a pity that he tries to play said toothbrush on the night of the concert! Soon after that, the butter that he's carrying in his blazer pocket (his contribution to the aforementioned 'At Home' event) melts during a maths coaching session with Old Wilkie - much to the latter's fury.	Dedication: "For the Boys of Canterbury Cathedral Choir School"
12	Just Like Jennings	1961	Jennings and Darbishire's summer term at Linbury gets off to a ropey start even before their arrival at the school. First, they nearly miss the train, then, after Jennings loses his ticket, the pair move further down the train to escape Old Wilkie's wrath, only to find that their carriage has split off from the others. Fortunately, the train driver and his mate take pity on them and arrange transport for them to Dunhambury - just in time for them to join the others on the bus. The pair later discover a suspected spy in the woods and an abominable snow-cat on the balcony. Aunt Angela's cake-baking prowess comes in handy when Jennings breaks a vase belonging to Old Wilkie.	Dedication: "For H.H."
13	Leave it to Jennings	1963	Madame Olivera from the Inscrutable East (AKA Miss Tubbs of the Linbury Post Office bacon counter) tells Jennings's fortune and predicts a journey over land and sea, an unexpected legacy and that he will succeed in an ambition close to his heart. But no one foresees the chaos during the term as the three predictions come true.	The only book in the series whose jacket illustration depicts action that doesn't occur in the same story. In fact, the fortune telling scene shown only occurs 'offstage' at the end of the previous book, and not directly described at all. Dedication: "For Spikki"
14	Jennings, Of Course!	1964	Jennings starts the term by getting himself wet and muddy yet again - in a ditch this time - but is lucky enough to be able to get his clothes dry-cleaned without either the masters or Matron finding out. He then proves more of a hindrance than a help to Old Wilkie's campaign to empty the lost property cupboard but all is forgiven when it leads to the appointment of a new cook. And Old Wilkie saves the day when Jennings conjures up a potential disaster at the end of term concert.	Dedication: "For John and Andrew Williams"
15	Especially Jennings!	1965	The Jennings Membership Club is launched with mysterious objectives. Jennings gets mistaken for a burglar (again), accidentally gets Old Wilkie accused of stealing his own car, and goes to great efforts to win la plume de sa tante before Mr Carter suggests a worthy cause for the JMC's outstanding funds.	Dedication: "For John Henry Ainley"
16	Jennings Abounding	1967	Jennings helped get the Fire Brigade in time to put out the fire, but luckily the Head didn't ask any questions. And then there was the business of the racing pigeon.	(retitled Jennings Unlimited when re-published in 1993 to avoid confusion with the 1980 stage show of the same name) Dedication: "For Toby Price"
17	Jennings in Particular	1968	A daring rescue mission is needed when Jennings and Darbishire get trapped in the attic whilst fielding at the first ever inter-planetary cricket match, and it later becomes clear that even the best regulated of boarding schools cannot cope when a certain member of Form 3 accidentally wins a pig. Later, the pig is exchanged for a jar of bath salts, which Jennings gives to Matron - only to discover, to his horror, that the jar may also contain a drawing pin. Meanwhile, Darbishire discovers a link between Pythagoras and travelling arrangements for fat and thin Red Indian women - much to Old Wilkie's despair!	Dedication: "Corin, his book"
18	Trust Jennings!	1969	At Linbury Court, it's certainly a case of remember, remember the fifth of November when Jennings copyrights his famous plan for members of Form 3 to act as Public Relations Officer to G Fawkes Esq (deceased) to raise funds for Famine Relief, undergoing an emergency haircut, an accidental mis-use of Old Wilkie's sports coat, and a day out in Dunhambury with a honky tonk piano in tow.	Dedication: "For Felix Otton"
19	The Jennings Report	1970	Jennings plans to report on a mathematical comparison of TV aerials in rural (Linbury) and urban (Dunhambury) locations - but gets distracted with the care of Old Sleepy, the top secret hedgehog.	Released as an Audiobook by Post Hypnotic Press, narrated by Simon Vance, in 2011 Dedication: "Karen Tracy, her book"
20	Typically Jennings!	1971	Two broken tennis rackets lead to Jennings becoming a potholer and Darbishire a prehistoric cave painter, not to mention an explosive attempt to make a cup of tea for Old Wilkie on the school picnic. Meanwhile, Jennings' plan to listen to the test match in class lead to trouble for Bromwich, who resorts to giving an Old Master to a not quite so old master to get his portable transistor back.	Dedication: "For Sarah Jane and Roger Ardley"
21	Speaking of Jennings!	1973	A notice outside the village shop for a fishing rod for sale for 50p gives Jennings a brilliant money-making idea. Unfortunately it leads to his involvement with the dubious Wally Pink, while Linbury Court school is rocked by the affair of the missing toadstall-eating gerbils and the mysterious refusal of the birds to eat seventy-nine burnt breakfasts. Not to mention Old Wilkie's overdue library book.	
22	Jennings at Large	1977	The only story set in the school holidays, in which Jennings, Darbishire and their friends go on a camping trip with Mr Carter and Mr Wilkins - needless to say that chaos soon ensues, partly involving the feisty Major Rudkin, aka Major Trigger-Happy. Jennings then goes to stay with his Aunt Angela in her London flat, where he befriends Emma, a girl who lives in the same block - cue yet more chaos, especially for Aunt Angela and the block's caretaker, Herbert Fagg! Still to come are some further (and potentially explosive) encounters with Major Trigger-Happy.	This book makes clearest Buckeridge's personal politics, which were different from those widely assumed of him beforehand. Released as an Audiobook by Post Hypnotic Press, narrated by Simon Vance, in 2011 Dedication: "Nicola Suzanne, her book"
23	Jennings Again!	1991	Under the patronage of Miss Thorpe, Linbury is going green - collecting of rubbish, recycling, distribution of leaflets to raise awareness. The pupils at Linbury Court are desperate to help. But, as always with Jennings and Darbishire, good will is not synonymous with effectiveness and precious tropical fish are soon put in danger.	Excerpts have been recorded by Stephen Fry for BBC7 as five 15-minute readings. Released as an Audiobook by Post Hypnotic Press, narrated by Simon Vance, in 2011 Dedication: "For Eric Rosebery"
24	That's Jennings	1994	Jennings is certain that Mr Wilkins will forget all about the Form Three maths test if they butter him up a bit by welcoming him back with a nice pot plant and a get-well-soon card. How could Jennings know that his plan would backfire so abominably? The third-formers at Linbury Court have set up a Natural History club, and Jennings is keen to build up a collection of tadpoles. This serves as a backbone for the book, tying together several distinct adventures.	Dedication: "For the Leeds section of the Old Boys' Book Club"
25	A Bookful of Jennings	1996	A reprint (compilation) of Books 1–4.	Also titled The Best of Jennings.

== Radio ==
Jennings and his friends originally appeared on radio, the first play appearing on Children's Hour on the BBC Home Service in 1948. The early books were largely based on the radio scripts. The signature tune was The Old Clockmaker by Charles Williams. "Jennings Goes to School" and "Jennings Again!" were adapted for radio by Anthony Buckeridge, and read by Stephen Fry. The adaptations were released on audio cassette in 1991. "Jennings' Little Hut" was broadcast on BBC Radio 4 in 2010, narrated by Mark Williams.

== Television ==
There have been two BBC TV series based on the books, Jennings at School, which ran for ten thirty-minute episodes between 6 September and 8 November 1958, and Jennings, which ran for six episodes between 5 September and 10 October 1966. Jennings was played by John Mitchell in the first series, and by David Schulten in the second. No episodes of either series are known to have survived in the BBC archives or elsewhere.

John Mitchell later found fame as Mitch Mitchell, drummer in The Jimi Hendrix Experience.

== Stage adaptation ==
In 1980, there was a stage play called Jennings Abounding! (not based on the novel of that title) aimed at the schools market. Described as a comedy with music, with book and lyrics by Anthony Buckeridge, music by Hector Cortes and William Gomez, and additional music and arrangement by Nigel Carver.

== Foreign versions ==
The novels proved popular in other countries; in Germany Jennings is Fredy, and in France he became Bennett. Jennings was especially popular in Norway, where the main character became Stompa and the novels were rewritten with Norwegian locations. There was also a series of Norwegian film adaptations directed by Nils Reinhardt Christensen.
