= We, the Accused =

1935 novel

- 1983 Penguin edition
- Author: Ernest Raymond
- Language: English
- Genre: Crime
- Publisher: Cassell (UK); Stokes (US)
- Publication date: 1935
- Publication place: United Kingdom
- Media type: Print

We, the Accused is a 1935 crime novel by the British writer Ernest Raymond. It is inspired by the Edwardian era Doctor Crippen case. The novel is written to engage the reader's sympathy for the murderous protagonists.

== Synopsis ==
Schoolteacher Paul Presset lives with his domineering wife. When he realises there is a chance of finding happiness with a kinder woman, his thoughts turn increasingly to murder.

== Adaptation ==
In 1980, it was made into a five-part television series of the same name, starring Ian Holm, Angela Down and Iain Cuthbertson.

== Bibliography ==
- Baskin, Ellen. Serials on British Television, 1950-1994. Scolar Press, 1996.
- Dalrymple, Roger. Crippen: A Crime Sensation in Memory and Modernity. Boydell & Brewer, 2020.
- Hilfer, Tony. The Crime Novel: A Deviant Genre. University of Texas Press, 2014.
- Priestman, Martin . The Cambridge Companion to Crime Fiction. Cambridge University Press, 2003.
