= Elizabeth Spriggs =

English actress (1929–2008)

- Born: Elizabeth Jean Williams; 18 September 1929; Buxton, Derbyshire, England
- Died: 2 July 2008 (aged 78); Oxford, Oxfordshire, England
- Occupation: Actress
- Years active: 1962–2008
- Spouse(s): Kenneth Spriggs (1951–?; divorced); Marshall Jones (1965–?; divorced); Murray Manson (1977–2008)
- Children: 1

Elizabeth Jean Spriggs (18 September 1929 – 2 July 2008) was an English actress.

Spriggs' roles with the Royal Shakespeare Company included Nurse in Romeo and Juliet, Gertrude in Hamlet, and Beatrice in Much Ado About Nothing. In 1978, she won the Olivier Award for Best Supporting Actress for Arnold Wesker's Love Letters on Blue Paper. She received a BAFTA nomination for Best Supporting Actress for the 1995 film Sense and Sensibility. Her other films included Richard's Things (1980), Impromptu (1991), Paradise Road (1997), and Harry Potter and the Philosopher's Stone (2001).

== Early life and career ==
Born in Buxton, Derbyshire, in 1929, Spriggs had an unhappy childhood, later stating that she "grew up entirely without affection". Possessing a mezzo-soprano voice, she studied opera at the Royal College of Music, and taught speech and drama in Coventry. Her first marriage at 21 was a disaster and, in what she called "the most painful decision of my life", she left her husband and young daughter to pursue her acting dream. "The desire to act was like a weight within me", she later said, "and I knew if I didn't do anything about it, it would destroy me." She wrote to a repertory company in Stockport, Cheshire, asking for a job and was taken on. She worked with many companies, including in Birmingham and Bristol, before joining the Royal Shakespeare Company (RSC) in 1962.

== Stage career ==
Spriggs was a regular performer with the RSC under Peter Hall until 1976, playing many important Shakespearean roles, including Nurse in Romeo and Juliet, an acclaimed Gertrude in Hamlet opposite David Warner, Calpurnia in Julius Caesar, Mistress Ford in The Merry Wives of Windsor, and a witty Beatrice in Much Ado About Nothing. She also featured in RSC productions of Edward Albee's A Delicate Balance, Shaw's Major Barbara and Dion Boucicault's comedy London Assurance, playing Lady Gay Spanker alongside Donald Sinden.

In 1976, she moved with Hall from the RSC to the National Theatre when the company's own theatre opened. In the first season she played the eccentric medium Madame Arcati in Blithe Spirit. Among her many other plays for the National were Volpone with Paul Scofield, The Country Wife and Macbeth with Albert Finney. In 1978, Spriggs won the Society of West End Theatre Award for Best Supporting Actress for Arnold Wesker's Love Letters on Blue Paper, playing the wife of a dying trade union leader who recalls their early life together (a part she first played on BBC television in 1976).

Her later stage work included a West End revival of J. B. Priestley's When We Are Married in 1986, and Arsenic and Old Lace at the Chichester Festival Theatre in 1991.

== Television and film ==
Spriggs did not work regularly on television until the mid-1970s. She was in Frederic Raphael's The Glittering Prizes (1976), starred as Eleanor Pressett in the BBC drama We, the Accused (1980), played Connie, the head of a battling South London family in the thirteen-part drama Fox (1980), was Martha in Tales of the Unexpected (1980) and was the formidable Nan in the ITV comedy series Shine on Harvey Moon (1982–85). She appeared in three plays by Alan Bennett: Afternoon Off (1979), Intensive Care (1982) and Our Winnie (1982). She played Calpurnia and Mistress Quickly for the BBC's Shakespeare series, appeared in Doctor Who in the 1987 Sylvester McCoy serial Paradise Towers, and was the titular witch in the Children's BBC series Simon and the Witch (1987).

In 1990, she was one of the God-fearing gossips in the BBC adaptation of Jeanette Winterson's Oranges Are Not the Only Fruit and in 1992, was in television versions of Kingsley Amis's The Old Devils and Angus Wilson's Anglo-Saxon Attitudes. In 1994, she played the midwife Mrs Gamp in the BBC's adaptation of Charles Dickens's Martin Chuzzlewit and was Mrs Cadwallader in Middlemarch by George Eliot. She continued to work on television, in series like Heartbeat, Midsomer Murders (playing a murder victim in the pilot episode of the series in 1997 and returning in 2006 as the character's identical twin sister) and Poirot.

She was the subject of This Is Your Life in 1998, when she was surprised by Michael Aspel at Shepperton Studios.

Her early film appearances included Work Is a Four-Letter Word (1968) and 3 into 2 Won't Go (1969), both directed by Peter Hall. Her later character roles included Mrs Jennings in Emma Thompson's Oscar-winning adaptation of Sense and Sensibility (1995), a role for which she was nominated for a BAFTA Award for Best Actress in a Supporting Role (losing out to co-star Kate Winslet) and the Fat Lady in Harry Potter and the Philosopher's Stone (2001). Her final film was Is Anybody There? (2008) with Michael Caine, released shortly after her death.

== Personal life and death ==
Spriggs's first two marriages, to Kenneth Spriggs and a fellow RSC actor, Marshall Jones, were dissolved. In 1977, she married her third husband, Murray Manson, a mini-cab driver and musician whom she had met while performing in London Assurance. She had a daughter from her first marriage.

Spriggs died on 2 July 2008, at the age of 78. Her funeral service and interment took place at Saint Mary the Virgin's Churchyard in Thame, Oxfordshire and was attended by family and friends, including Sinéad Cusack, James Ellis and Lesley Sharp, Jeremy Irons, Robert Hardy and Peter Vaughan, who all paid tribute to their friend and fellow actor.

== Filmography ==
=== Film ===
| Year | Title | Role | Notes |
|---|---|---|---|
| 1968 | Work Is a Four-Letter Word | Mrs Murray | |
| 1969 | 3 into 2 Won't Go | Marcia | |
| 1980 | Richard's Things | Mrs Sells | |
| 1981 | Lady Chatterley's Lover | Lady Eva | |
| 1982 | An Unsuitable Job for a Woman | Miss Markland | |
| 1985 | Yellow Pages | Mrs Van Der Reuter | |
| 1991 | Impromptu | Baroness Laginsky | |
| 1993 | The Hour of the Pig | Madame Langlois | |
| 1995 | Sense and Sensibility | Mrs Jennings | |
| 1996 | The Secret Agent | Winnie's Mother | |
| 1996 | The Snow Queen's Revenge | Brenda | Voice |
| 1997 | Paradise Road | Mrs Roberts | |
| 1997 | For My Baby | Olga Jenikova | |
| 1998 | The Barber of Siberia | Perepelkina | |
| 2001 | Harry Potter and the Philosopher's Stone | The Portrait of the Fat Lady | |
| 2004 | The Queen of Sheba's Pearls | Laura Pretty | |
| 2008 | Is Anybody There? | Prudence | (final film role) |

=== Television ===
| Year | Title | Role | Notes |
|---|---|---|---|
| 1973 | Second City Firsts | Zena Paul | Episode: Mrs. Pool's Reserves |
| 1974–1982 | Play for Today | Various | 4 episodes, including Leeds United! |
| 1975 | Lucky Fella | Mrs. Mepstead | Pilot |
| 1975 | Village Hall | Maggie Snape | Episode: "Miss Health and Beauty" |
| 1976 | The Expert | Mrs. Kyneston | Episode: "A Family Affair" |
| 1979 | Afternoon Off | Miss Beckinsale | TV film |
| 1979, 1982 | BBC Television Shakespeare | Calpurnia/ Mistress Quickly | Episodes: Julius Caesar/The Merry Wives of Windsor |
| 1980 | Fox | Connie Fox | |
| 1980–1981 | Tales of the Unexpected | Aunt May/Martha Sturgis | Episodes: "The Orderly World of Mr Appleby"/"The Way to Do It" |
| 1981 | Bognor | Alisa Potts | 6 episodes |
| 1981 | Crown Court | Janet Godfrey | Episode: "Embers" |
| 1982 | Spider's Web | Mildred Peake | TV film |
| 1982 | The Haunting of Cassie Palmer | Mrs. Palmer | 6 episodes |
| 1982–1995 | Shine on Harvey Moon | Nan | 41 episodes |
| 1983 | Those Glory Glory Days | School Mistress | TV movie |
| 1984 | The Cold Room | Frau Hoffman | TV movie |
| 1984 | Strangers and Brothers | Lady Muriel Royce | 3 episodes |
| 1985 | Bergerac | Ms Mary-Lou Costain | Episode: "Return of the Ice Maiden" |
| 1986 | Jackanory | Storyteller | Episode: London Snow |
| 1987–88 | Simon and the Witch | The Witch | 25 episodes |
| 1987 | Doctor Who | Tabby | Serial: "Paradise Towers" |
| 1988–91 | Watching | Aunt Peggy | 5 episodes |
| 1989 | Singles | Pam's Mother | Episode: "Family Likeness" |
| 1990 | Boon | Mrs. Whitfield | Episode: "The Tender Trap" |
| 1990 | Oranges Are Not the Only Fruit | May | Miniseries |
| 1991 | Soldier Soldier | Mrs. Henwood | Episode: "Dirty Work" |
| 1992 | Heartbeat | Rene Kirby | Episode: "Rumours" |
| 1992 | The Ruth Rendell Mysteries | Eva Peterlees | Episode: "The Mouse in the Corner – Part 1" |
| 1992 | The Young Indiana Jones Chronicles | Schultz | Episode: "Austria, March 1917" |
| 1993 | The Case-book of Sherlock Holmes | Mrs. Mason | Episode: "The Last Vampyre" |
| 1993 | Jeeves and Wooster | Aunt Agatha | 2 episodes |
| 1993 | Lovejoy | Daphne Shortley | Episode: "Fly the Flag" |
| 1994 | The Inspector Alleyn Mysteries | Lady Lacklander | Episode: "Scales of Justice" |
| 1994 | Martin Chuzzlewit | Mrs. Gamp | Miniseries |
| 1994 | Middlemarch | Mrs. Cadwallader | Miniseries |
| 1994 | Takin' Over the Asylum | Grandma | Miniseries |
| 1995 | The Tomorrow People | Millicent Rutherford | Serial: "The Rameses Connection" |
| 1996 | Tales from the Crypt | Mrs Trask | Episode: "A Slight Case of Murder" |
| 1997, 2006 | Midsomer Murders | Iris Rainbird/Ursula Gooding | Episode: "The Killings at Badger's Drift"/"Dead Letters" |
| 1998 | Casualty | Barbara Thomas | Episode: "Eye Spy" |
| 1998–2002 | Playing the Field | Mrs. Mullen | 26 episodes |
| 1999 | Alice in Wonderland | The Duchess | TV film |
| 1999 | A Christmas Carol | Mrs. Riggs | TV film |
| 1999 | Wives and Daughters | Mrs Goodenough | 3 episodes |
| 2000 | Randall & Hopkirk (Deceased) | Mrs Glauneck | Episode: "A Man of Substance" |
| 2000 | The Sleeper | Cath | Miniseries |
| 2001–2002 | Nice Guy Eddie | Vera McMullen | 7 episodes |
| 2002 | Shackleton | Janet Stancombe Wills | Miniseries |
| 2003 | Wren: The Man Who Built Britain | Queen Anne | TV movie documentary |
| 2003–2004 | Swiss Toni | Swiss Toni's Mother | 12 episodes |
| 2003–2004 | The Royal | Dolly Smith | 2 episodes |
| 2005 | Where the Heart Is | Maureen | Episode: "Care" |
| 2005 | Heartbeat | Mrs. Andrews | Episode: "The End of the Road" |
| 2005 | Jericho | Ellen Jericho | Episode: "The Hollow Men" |
| 2006 | Agatha Christie's Poirot | Mrs Leadbetter | Episode: "Taken at the Flood" |
| 2008 | Love Soup | Penny's Mother | Episode: "Integrated Logistics" |
