= Identity Unknown (1960 film) =

British drama by Frank Marshall

- Directed by: Frank Marshall
- Written by: Brian Clemens
- Produced by: Edward J. Danziger; Harry Lee Danziger
- Starring: Richard Wyler; Pauline Yates; Patricia Plunkett
- Cinematography: James Wilson
- Edited by: Lee Doig
- Music by: Tony Crombie
- Release date: 1960
- Running time: 66 minutes
- Country: United Kingdom
- Language: English

Identity Unknown is a 1960 British drama film directed by Frank Marshall and starring Richard Wyler, Pauline Yates and Patricia Plunkett. It was written by Brian Clemens and produced by The Danzigers.

== Plot ==
Two reporters develop a relationship while investigating an aircraft accident.

== Cast ==
- Richard Wyler as John
- Pauline Yates as Jenny
- Patricia Plunkett as Betty
- Beatrice Varley as Matron
- Valentine Dyall as Ambrose
- Kenneth Edwards as Reynold
- John Gabriel as Jamieson
- Nyree Dawn Porter as Pam
- Vincent Ball as Ken
- Sheldon Lawrence as Larry
- Derek Blomfield as John Perkins
- Stella Bonheur as Mrs. Phillips
- Robert Cawdron as Flynn
- John Carson as Ray (uncredited)

== Critical reception ==
The Monthly Film Bulletin wrote: "A complicated and episodic blend of sentiment and suspense, which fails in the latter aim through the confusion and number of its miniature dramas. The handling is somewhat crude, the acting variable, and it seems too much of a coincidence that the two reporters should be so extraordinarily fortunate as to find everyone they wish to interview in London."

Kine Weekly wrote: "The tale has everything except comedy, but uneven acting and treatment makes it difficult to grasp, let alone follow, its many threads. ... The picture or, to be more precise, gallery of vignettes keeps the survivors' identity a secret until the end, yet fails to build up suspense. Pauline Yates is a likeable Jenny; Richard Wyler registers as John; and Valentine Dyall's not too bad as Ambrose, but the others aren't much cop. The script creates an air of expectancy at the start, but conflicting cross-currents cause it to "pancake". It has little emotional lift."
