= Tell England =

1922 novel by Ernest Raymond

Early edition

Tell England: A Study in a Generation is a novel written by Ernest Raymond and published in February 1922 in the United Kingdom. Its themes are the First World War and the young men sent to fight in it.

The book became a bestseller, some 300,000 copies being sold by the end of 1939. Forty editions were printed by Cassell between 1922 and 1969, prior to the first impression printed by Corgi in 1973. A film adaptation of the same title was released in 1931.

== Plot summary ==
Following a short prologue, the body of the novel is divided into two halves (or "books"), both narrated by Rupert Ray. The first book tells the story of his and his friends' progress through school; while the second deals with the experiences of (specifically) Ray and his friend Edgar Doe during the war.

=== Prologue ===
The prologue is written in the voice of Padre Monty, an army chaplain who is a character from Book II. He writes affectionately and retrospectively of the three boys Rupert Ray, Edgar Doe and Archibald Pennybet as they were in childhood. The inference is that he has acquired this information from the boys' mothers, given that he first meets Ray and Doe in the Great War.

=== Book I: "Five gay years of school" ===
The first book contains many of the elements of the classic school story, describing the lives of Rupert Ray and his friends as they progress through their public school, Kensingstowe, and the pranks they play on the masters. Raymond spends much of the novel setting up the characters and their relationships in this way.

Rupert himself is a shy boy, lacking in courage and in need of moral guidance in the absence of a father figure. Edgar Doe, nicknamed the "Grey Doe", is equally shy, but is more sensitive and inclined to fall in love with older men such as their strict master Radley. Both boys are heavily influenced by the older Archibald "Penny" Pennybet, who enjoys wielding youthful power over others by stirring up acts of mischief. Rupert's school career includes an ongoing feud with his housemaster (known as "Carpet Slippers"), receiving beatings and punishments, learning to do what is right, and – his greatest hour – winning the school relay swimming race, only to be disqualified, but then made a prefect on account of his maturity in dealing with the disappointment. Radley is a heavy influence in all this, offering Rupert advice and encouragement to make the right choices. In one episode, the entire class has been cheating in Carpet Slippers' history lessons, only for Rupert to admit his guilt by recording a mark of zero after Radley's prompting. The book repeatedly makes dark suggestions as to the boys' future after school. For example, at the end of a triumphant cricket match the masters at Kensingstowe consider what England will do with the young men they are moulding. Radley himself is a weary, beaten figure when he learns that his favourite pupils, Ray and Doe, are off to war.

=== Book II: "And the rest – war" ===
When the war breaks out it is treated with much excitement, and the boys leave school to join the army as officers. Raymond's enthusiastic portrayal represents an attitude widespread at the time. It is encapsulated in a speech by the boys' new commanding officer, the Colonel:

Eighteen by Jove! You've timed your lives wonderfully, my boys. To be eighteen in 1914 is to be the best thing in England. England's wealth used to consist in other things. Nowadays you boys are the richest thing she's got. She's solvent with you, and bankrupt without you. Eighteen confound it! It's a virtue to be your age, just as it's a crime to be mine.

Ray and Doe are posted to Gallipoli, and despite Ray's pain at leaving his mother, and his clear worry that he will never see her again, they are still optimistic and eager to join the fight. The news that Pennybet has been killed at Neuve Chapelle on the Western Front, and that three of their schoolmates (their house captain, their school's most promising cricketer, and Rupert's relay-team captain) have all died in April in Gallipoli dampens their spirits. There is a bitter irony in this passage, for all three possessed promising lives that were snuffed out the moment they landed on the beaches.

In the East, the boys spend months in a camp on the island of Lemnos waiting for any action, but are finally sent to Cape Helles on the Gallipoli peninsula, where they find themselves up against "Asiatic Annie", a 7-mile ranging Turkish gun, and another well-placed gun that kills many of their friends. Doe accepts a promotion to Bombing Officer with characteristic enthusiasm. Ray is promoted to Captain. They are both junior subalterns, the rank that suffered the greatest losses in the Great War, owing to their courage and visibility as leaders of the front line. As the Germans break through Serbia, and British and French troops at Gallipoli begin to withdraw, Doe and Ray's unit is ordered to launch an attack as a diversion. Doe breaks over the top of the line and is shot in the shoulder. He falls, but manages to get up and blow up the offending Turkish gun. He is then shot four more times in the waist. Padre Monty rushes out to bring him out of no man's land. Doe subsequently dies, but not before Ray has a tearful final farewell with his best friend.

When leaving Gallipoli, Ray is charged by Padre Monty to tell England about what has happened. "You must write a book and tell 'em, Rupert, about the dead schoolboys of your generation."

The end of the novel is written from a trench on the Western Front in 1918, just as the Allies are about to defeat Germany and end the Great War. Rupert intimates that he has finished his story in time, but it is not revealed whether he survives this final passage of war. We are asked to believe that he is happy because he has lived, experienced beauty, known the purest of friendships and had twenty glorious years. The book ends on that note.

== Title ==
The novel's title is taken from an epitaph by Edmund Garrett that is inscribed on the grave of one of Doe and Ray's friends, (Note: Edmund Garrett (1865–1907) wrote an epitaph inspired by the famous epitaph of Simonides at Thermopylae: Tell England, ye who pass this monument, We, who died serving her, rest here content. It is to be found engraved on all the obelisks at Wagon Hill Cemetery and at other battlefield monuments, surmounting the graves of officers and troopers in the Imperial Light Horse who fell during the Second Boer War. It also appears on some other Boer War graves. In the immediate decades after the Boer War it was well known and it was the inspiration for the title of Raymond's book and the slightly differently worded epitaph contained within its covers.) and is presumably also inscribed on Doe's, given that he had asked Ray to do so. It reads:

Tell England, ye who pass this monument,
We died for her, and here we rest content.

== Dedication ==
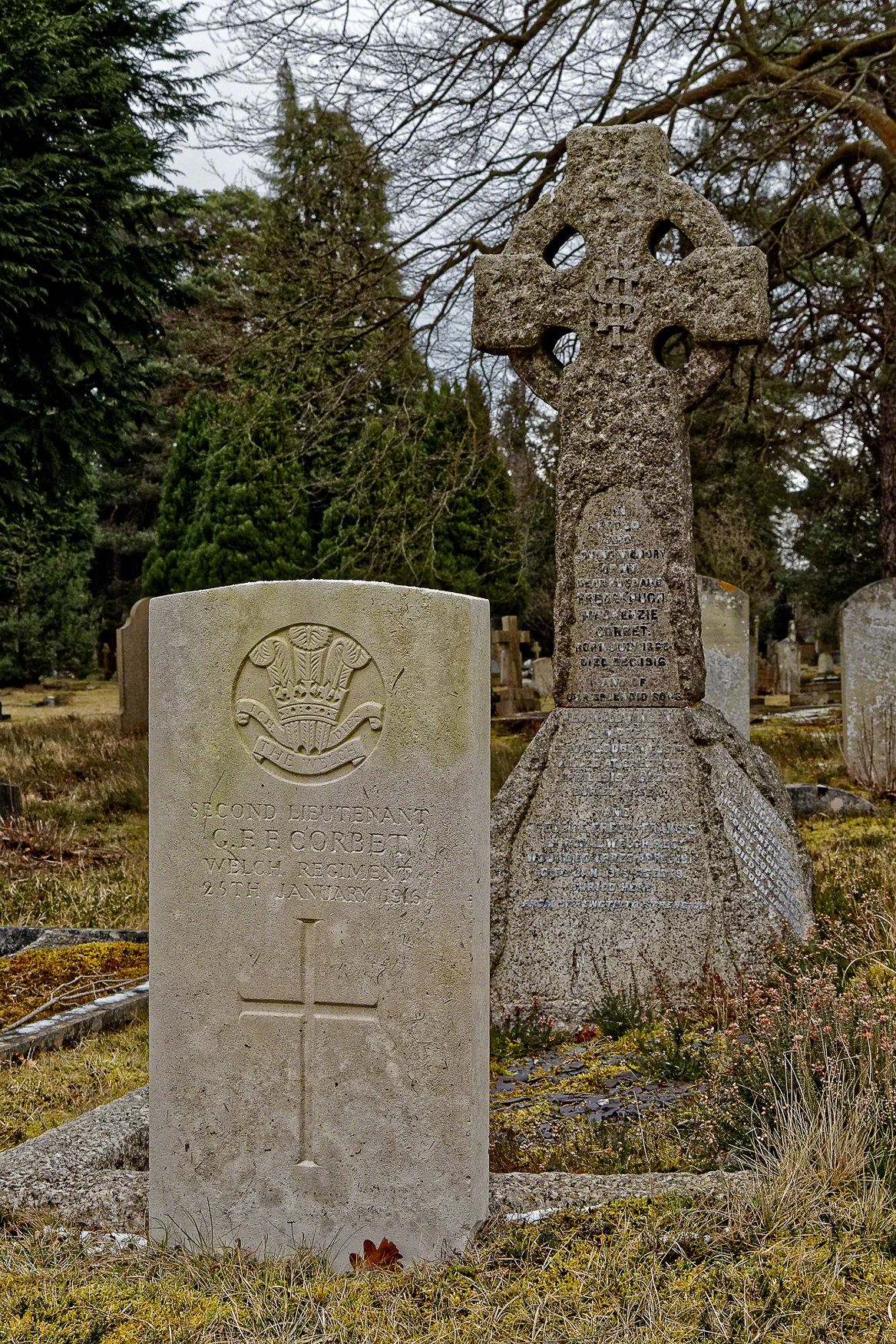
CWGC headstone for G. F. F. Corbet at the foot of the Corbet family plot in Brookwood Cemetery

The novel is dedicated "to the memory of REGINALD VINCENT CAMPBELL CORBET who fell, while a boy, in the East and GEORGE FREDERICK FRANCIS CORBET who passed, while a boy, in the West". The author, Ernest Raymond, named his narrator Rupert Ray in a thinly disguised reference to himself. It has been speculated, therefore, that the character Edgar Doe, who dies in Gallipoli (the East), is based on Reginald Corbet, while the character Archibald Pennybet, who dies on the Western Front, is based on George Corbet.

== Themes ==
=== Religion ===
A major theme of the novel is religious redemption, and in the second half of the book Padre Monty becomes to Ray and Doe what Radley was at Kensingtowe. He teaches them about the communion and about confession, and achieves the unlikely feat of drawing confessions from both boys. Padre Monty views the pair as his greatest triumph, and is happy to be sending them out to battle "white" and pure. Still, both boys have their doubts about the approaching war as their ship draws nearer to Gallipoli. Doe is the enthusiast, with high aspirations but a sensitive heart. Ray is slightly heavier of spirits, but Padre Monty encourages him to seek beauty in everything.

When first informed that their battalion is being posted to the Gallipoli front, the Colonel explicitly paints the campaign in terms of a crusade:

Now boys, follow me through this. You're not over-religious, I expect, but you're Christians before you're Moslems, and your hands should fly to your swords when I say the Gallipoli campaign is a New Crusade. You're going out to force a passage through the Dardanelles to Constantinople. And Constantinople is a sacred city. It's the only ancient city purely Christian in its origin, having been built by the first Christian Emperor in honour of the Blessed Virgin. Which brings us to the noblest idea of all. In their fight to wrest this city from the Turk, the three great divisions of the Church are united once more. The great Roman branch is represented by the soldiers and ships of France: the great Eastern Orthodox branch by the Russians, who are behind the fight: the great Anglican branch by the British, who can be proud to have started the movement, and to be leading it. Thus Christendom United fights for Constantinople, under the leadership of the British, whose flag is made up of the crosses of the saints. The army opposing the Christians fights under the crescent of Islam.
It's the Cross against the Crescent again, my lads. By Jove, it's splendid, perfectly splendid! And an English cross, too!

=== Male friendship and homoeroticism ===
There is an underlying homoerotic flavour to much of the novel – especially Book I – with vivid descriptions of boys as magnificent creatures, God's highest form of creation and Britain's greatest accomplishment. Ray writes of the master, Radley:

I know now that his feeling for all the boys, as he gazed down upon them from his splendid height, was love – a strong, active love. We were young, human things, of soft features gradually becoming firmer as of shallow characters gradually deepening. And he longed to be in it all – at work in the deepening. We were his hobby. I have met many such lovers of youth. Indeed, I think this is a book about them.

A great part of the novel is a romantic ode to the friendship between Ray and Doe. Rupert's love for Edgar is painted in classical hues as equivalent to that of Orestes who loved Pylades. The reader never feels that Ray's feelings for Doe are sexual; but there are intimations in Doe's unwillingness to confess to Padre Monty, and his admission that he has done "everything", that he may himself be homosexual. At one point, the 13-year-old Doe admits: "Do you know, I really think I like Radley better than anyone else in the world. I simply loved being whacked by him." Three years later, he enters into an enigmatically close friendship with another boy, Freedham. Pennybet attempts to explain this relationship to Ray: "When you're my age, Rupert, ... you'll know that there are such things as degenerates and decadents. Freedham is one. And very soon Doe will be another." Later, Doe confesses to having got drunk and taken drugs with Freedham, adding: "There are not many things we haven't done together." The adult Doe is described by Ray as being "as graceful as a girl and as sinuous as a serpent".

One of the final messages in the book is given by Padre Monty to Rupert Ray as a means of consoling him to Edgar's death. He says that Rupert and Edgar's friendship is more perfect because of Edgar's death. Had they simply been school friends who went their separate ways, they would eventually have lost trace of one another. Instead, Edgar will forever be inscribed upon Ray's memory as the war held them in deepening intimacy until the end.

Raymond later said that when he re-read the novel in the late 1960s, he was "astonished by its latent homosexuality".

== Publication history ==
The book was originally published by Cassell and Company. Forty editions were printed by Cassell between 1922 and 1969, prior to the first impression printed by Corgi in 1973. It was most recently reprinted in 2005, when it was republished by IndyPublish.com (ISBN 1-4219-4612-2). Raymond returned to the theme of Gallipoli and male friendship in his 1958 novel The Quiet Shore.

== Reception ==
The novel received mixed reviews when first published. Hannen Swaffer, writing in the Daily Graphic, considered it "a book of penetrating analysis, a volume that illumines the souls of thousands ... a book that will be read proudly wherever English people live ... a book which will live as long as our spoken tongue". In contrast, the Evening Standard found it "laughable – when it is not revolting by reason of the sentimentality with which the autobiography of Rupert Ray is sticky from cover to cover". Rose Macaulay, writing in the Daily News, thought it "apparently by a rather illiterate and commonplace sentimentalist", and considered that the book had "no beauty, and its silliness and bad taste are not the work of a writer". S. P. B. Mais thought it "[a] quite unreadable novel about public school life and the war"; while Francis Birrell judged it "the most nauseating book to have come out of the war".

The book proved extremely popular with readers, and some 300,000 copies had been sold by the end of 1939. A film adaptation (of the same title) was released in 1931.

Among more recent commentators, Samuel Hynes in 1990 found the novel imbued with a "spirit of Brookeish, schoolboy patriotism". Hugh Cecil in 1995 considered that Raymond's account "of golden youth going through what he innocently, but appropriately, called 'Five Gay Years at School' before meeting their ends in a state of moral purity at Gallipoli, seems now absurd". Jenny Macleod in 2004 thought that the book "now seems chauvinistic and bombastic". Edward Madigan in 2011 found it "extremely sentimental", adding that it was "difficult to take the deliriously impressionable protagonists seriously".

== Bibliography ==
- Cecil, Hugh (1995). The Flower of Battle: British fiction writers of the First World War. London: Secker & Warburg. ISBN 0-436-202905.
- Cook, Edward Tyas (2013) [1909], Edmund Garrett: A Memoir, London: Forgotten Books, p. 186
- Gibson, George Fleming (1937), The Story of the Imperial Light Horse in the South African War, 1899–1902, Johannesburg: G. D. & Co., p. 203
- Hynes, Samuel (2011) [1990], A War Imagined: The First World War and English Culture (illustrated ed.), Random House, pp. 481–482, ISBN 9781446467923
- Jebb, Caroline (1907), Life and Letters of Sir Richard Claverhouse Jebb O.M., Litt.D. by his wife, Cambridge: Cambridge University Press, p. 423
- Macleod, Jenny (2004), Reconsidering Gallipoli, Manchester: Manchester University Press, pp. 158–61, ISBN 0-7190-6742-1
- Madigan, Edward (2011). Faith under Fire: Anglican Army chaplains and the Great War. Basingstoke: Palgrave Macmillan. ISBN 978-0-230-23745-2.
- Parker, Peter (1987), The Old Lie: the Great War and the Public-School Ethos, London: Constable, ISBN 0-09-466980-5
- Raymond, Ernest (1922), Tell England: a study in a generation, London: Cassell and Company
- Raymond, Ernest (1973), Tell England, Corgi, ISBN 0-552-09243-6
- Raymond, Ernest (1968), The Story of My Days: An Autobiography 1888–1922, London: Cassell
- Raymond, Ernest (1969), Please You, Draw Near: Autobiography 1922–1968, London: Cassell
- Vandiver, Elizabeth (2010), Stand in the Trench, Achilles: Classical Receptions in British Poetry of the Great War Classical Presences, Oxford: Oxford University Press, pp. lxii–lxiii, ISBN 9780191609213
