= Patricia Plunkett =

English actress (1926–1974)

Patricia Ruth Plunkett
- Patricia Plunkett
- Born: Patricia Ruth Plunkett; 17 December 1926; Streatham, London, England, UK
- Died: 13 October 1974 (aged 47); London, England, UK
- Years active: 1946 – c. 1961
- Spouse(s): Tim Turner (1951–1974)

Patricia Ruth Plunkett (17 December 1926 – 13 October 1974) was an English actress, born to an Australian WWI soldier, Captain Gunning Francis Plunkett, and Alice Park.

Born in Streatham, London, she trained at RADA and had an early stage hit in Pick-Up Girl (1946) by the American dramatist Elsa Shelley.

Plunkett appeared in 12 films. She was usually in supporting roles, but she was the female lead (with above-the-title billing) in both her 1949 films: Landfall and For Them That Trespass. The best known of her supporting roles is probably It Always Rains on Sunday (1947), in which her character, Doris Sandigate, is the step-daughter of Rose (Googie Withers), the leading role. Her husband was the actor Tim Turner (died 1987).

== Filmography ==
Year	Title	Role	Notes
1947	It Always Rains on Sunday	Doris Sandigate	
1948	Bond Street	Mary Phillips	
1949	For Them That Trespass	Rosie	
1949	Landfall	Mona	
1950	Murder Without Crime	Jan, Stephen's Wife	
1952	Mandy	Miss Crocker	
1954	The Crowded Day	Alice	
1957	The Flesh Is Weak	Doris Newman	
1958	Dunkirk	Grace Holden	
1960	Identity Unknown	Betty	
1960	Escort for Hire	Eldon Baker	
1961	The Singer Not the Song	Arcelia	Uncredited
