= Mr Olim =

- First edition Cover art by John Finnie
- Author: Ernest Raymond
- Language: English
- Publisher: Cassell
- Publication date: 1961
- LC Class: PZ3.R2153 Mk

Mr Olim is a novel by Ernest Raymond, published in 1961 to critical acclaim by Cassell. It is often used by teacher training colleges to encourage students to analyse successful teaching.

In his retirement, Davey La Tour looks back to his schooldays – specifically, to his first year at St Erkenwald's, a public school in west London (based on Raymond's own school, St Paul's). There he meets the fearsome Dr Hodder, High Master, and his form master, the equally volatile Mr Olim. During that year he develops a deep respect for the acerbic but inspirational classicist. Years later he organises a celebratory dinner for the now retired pedagogue.

The book was serialised on BBC Radio 4's Book at Bedtime in October 1990, and turned into a Talking Book for the Blind.
