= The Glittering Prizes =

- Genre: Drama
- Written by: Frederic Raphael
- Directed by: Waris Hussein; Robert Knights
- Starring: Tom Conti
- Country of origin: United Kingdom
- Original language: English
- No. of seasons: 1
- No. of episodes: 6

Production
- Producer: Mark Shivas
- Running time: 80 minutes
- Production company: BBC

Original release
- Network: BBC2
- Release: 21 January – 25 February 1976

The Glittering Prizes is a British television drama by Frederic Raphael about the changing lives of a group of Cambridge students, starting in 1952 and following them through to middle age in the 1970s. It was first broadcast on BBC2 in January 1976 and later adapted into a novel of the same name.

== Episodes ==
Episode 1 ‘An Early Life’ aired 21 January 1976
Plot outline: It is the mid-1950s, Adam Morris (Tom Conti) begins his career as a Cambridge undergraduate on a scholarship. Some of Adam's views about class and religious faith are tested by an aristocratic fellow undergraduate who shares his rooms. The series's characters are introduced by their involvement in a play by the Cambridge Footlights.

Episode 2 ‘A Love Life’ aired 28 January 1976
Plot outline: Still the mid fifties., Adam marries Barbara (Barbara Kellerman), despite parental opposition, whilst Joyce (Angela Down) finds herself pregnant by Alan (John Gregg) but marries Dan (Malcolm Stoddard).

Episode 3 ‘A Past Life’ aired 4 February 1976
Plot outline: The early 1960s, Adam (Tom Conti) has a bruising encounter with a famous writer Stephen Taylor (Eric Porter) who was once a fascist sympathiser but then goes on to write an Oscar-winning screenplay.

Episode 4 ‘A Country Life’ aired 11 February 1976
Plot outline: The mid sixties. Set at a boys' approved school Joyce (Angela Down) must finally face up to some unpleasant truths about her seemingly idyllic marriage to Dan (Malcolm Stoddard), now a teacher, when their old Cambridge friend Alan (John Gregg (actor)), now a media personality, drops in.

Episode 5 ‘An Academic Life’ aired 18 February 1976
Plot Outline: the late sixties. Accusations of racism are made by student militants at a plate glass university featuring, Dinsdale Landen as Gavin Pope, Ray Smith (actor) as Austin Denny, Clive Merrison as Bill Bourne, Suzanne Stone as Joann Bourne, Tim Pigott-Smith as Tim Dent, Carolle Rousseau as Jeanne Dent.

Episode 6 ‘A Double Life’ aired 25 February 1976
Plot outline: It’s 1976, Adam (Tom Conti), by now a famous writer, copes with the death of his father and tragedies in the personal lives of some old Cambridge friends.

== Cast (selected) ==
Character	Actor
Adam Morris	Tom Conti
Barbara Morris	Barbara Kellerman
Lionel Morris	Leonard Sachs
Joyce Hadleigh/Bradley	Angela Down
Dan Bradley	Malcolm Stoddard
Barbara Ransome/Parks	Anna Carteret
Donald Davidson	David Robb
Mike Clode	Mark Wing-Davey
Anna Cunningham	Emily Richard
Alan Parks	John Gregg
Denis Porson	Nigel Havers
Bill Bourne	Clive Merrison
Stephen Taylor	Eric Porter
Gavin Pope	Dinsdale Landen

== Related works ==
- Fame and Fortune (2007) novel (sequel to The Glittering Prizes). Broadcast by BBC Radio 4 in six episodes October–November 2007
- Final Demands (2010) novel (sequel to Fame and Fortune). Broadcast by BBC Radio 4 in six episodes March 2010
