= Olim Kamalov =

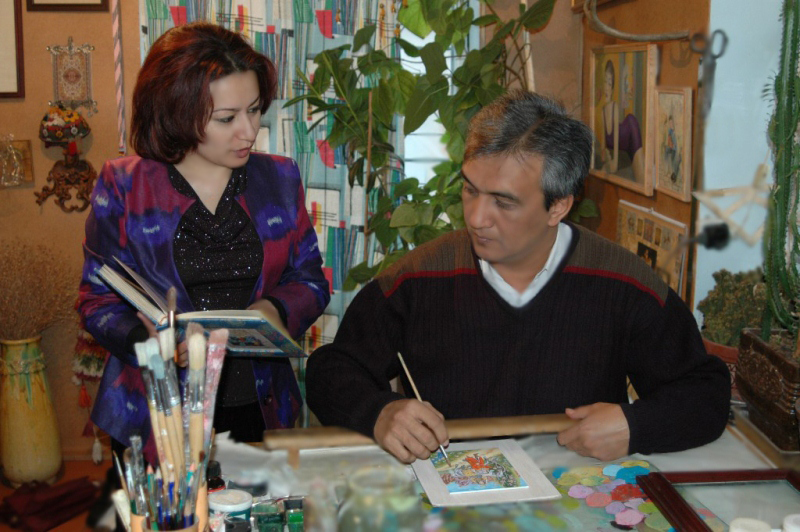
Family of artists, Olim Kamalov and Sarvinoz Hodjieva

Olim Kamalov, Tajik artist, was born on 3 May 1960 in Dushanbe, Tajikistan.

== Early life ==
Kamalov was born into the family of Tajik composer Azam Kamalov and librarian, Fotima Kamalova.

== Education ==
Attended Art College named after M. Olimov, Tajikistan, 1979. Institute of Design and Fine Arts, Tajikistan, 2014

== Work experience ==
By learning the specific of miniature painting and restoring copies of miniatures of Middle Age Persian artist Kamaleddin Behzad, Kamalov creates the series of his own works of modern miniature. He elaborated his own technology and paints miniatures on paper, canvas, wood and metal. In 2009 Olim Kamalov found Tajik school of miniature painting. Since then, his part in reviving miniature art in Tajikistan has been vital.

Of special interest are his original paintings depicting various episodes of everyday life in contemporary Tajikistan, both in towns and in rural areas. His rustic scenes are particularly curious because they have all the features of the traditional and rather generic decorative programme of medieval miniature painting, yet present a number of very truthful details of real peasant life in Tajik villages. They depict feasts such as weddings, Navruz (New Year), the paradisiacal revival of blossoming nature in spring, or thematic scenes such as kite runners, an old man talking to a young girl by a mountainous stream, and a loving couple in contemporary Tajik national dress under a blossoming tree. Kamalov’s successful attempt, through his works, to connect the Persian and Indian past with Tajik present, traditional crafts and high art, is his main contribution to modern Tajik visual culture.

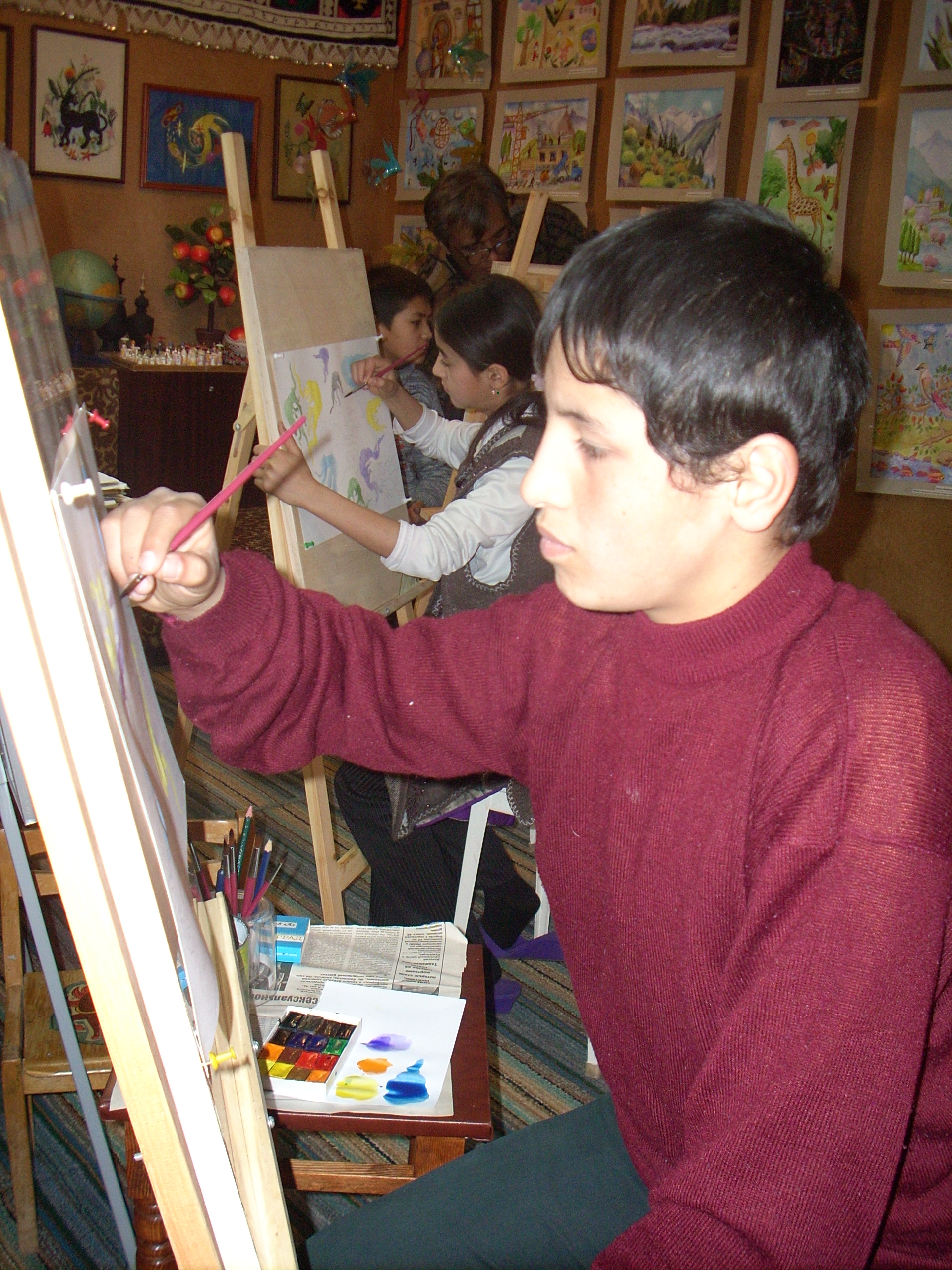
Olim Kamalov's students

== Awards ==
Received medal of honored artist of the Republic of Tajikistan in 2009.

== Professional memberships ==
Member of the Union of Artists of Tajikistan since 2003.

== Personal art exhibitions ==
2004, 2009 – Swiss Cooperation Office in Tajikistan.

2005 – Soros Foundation, Gallery of Union of Artists of Tajikistan.

2006 – Turkish Embassy, Tajikistan.

2008 – Kamalov's gallery.

2009 – Indian Embassy, Tajikistan.

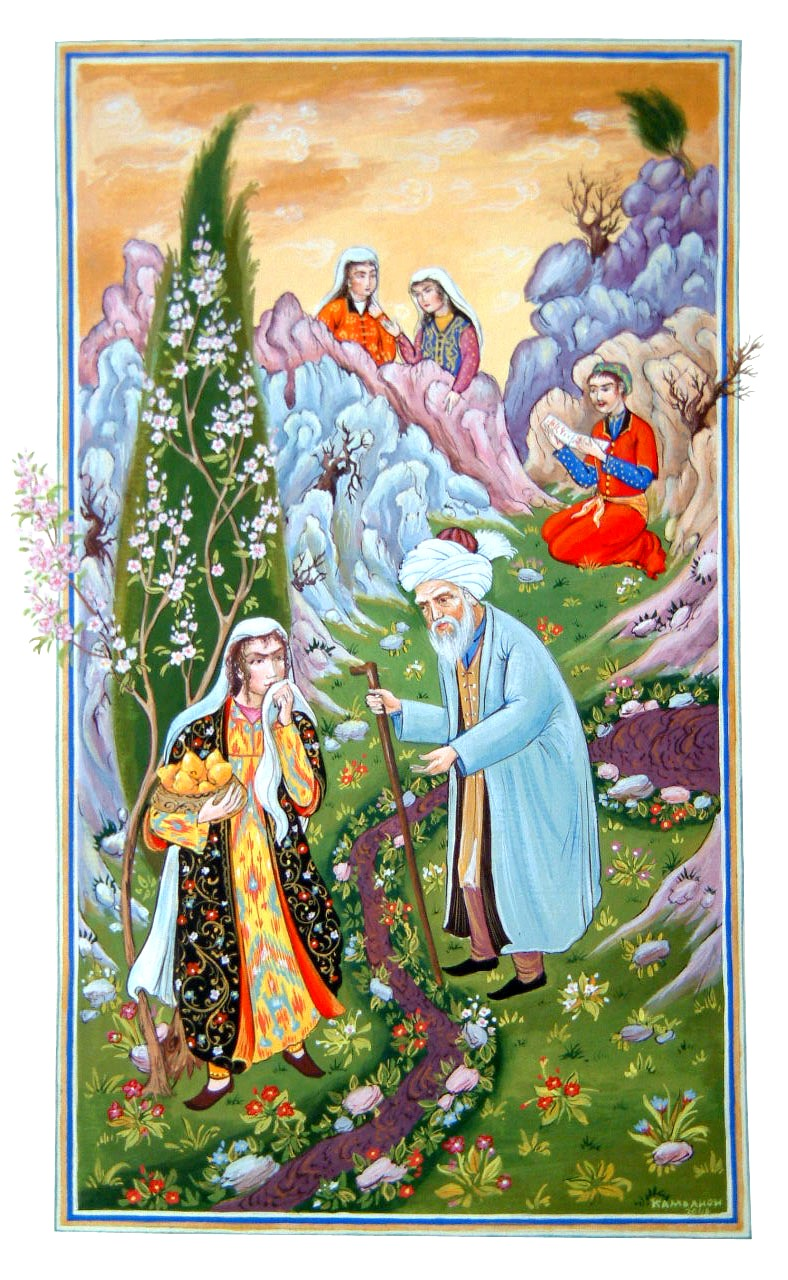
Olim Kamalov, An old man and a girl, 30х40cm, 2002

== International Group Art exhibitions ==
Day of National Reconciliation in Tajikistan ( Dushanbe, Gallery of Union of artists of Tajikistan, 2002, 2007)

Day of culture of Tajikistan in Russian Federation (Moscow, Dushanbe, 2005)

Day of culture of Tajikistan in France ( Paris, 2005)

Day of culture of Tajikistan in Belarus (Minsk, 2008)

Day of culture of Tajikistan in India (Delhi, 2008)
