= Angela Down =

English actress (born 1946)

- Born: 15 June 1946 (age 80)
- Occupation: Actress
- Years active: 1969–2009
- Spouse: Tim Hardy

Angela Down (born 15 June 1946) is an English actress. She is known for her role in the BBC drama programme Take Three Girls portraying cockney art student Avril for the first series before being replaced in the second.

== Career ==
Down played a leading role as Princess Maria in the 15-hour BBC version of Leo Tolstoy's War and Peace (1972), starred as Sylvia Pankhurst in the BBC's Shoulder to Shoulder (1974), as Joyce Bradley in the television adaptation of Frederick Raphael’s The Glittering Prizes (1976) and played teacher Myra Bawne in the 1980 BBC drama serial We, the Accused, opposite Ian Holm. She performed as Helena in the 1981 BBC Shakespeare collection, All's Well That Ends Well.

Her film roles include appearances in The Looking Glass War (1970), the cult horror film What Became of Jack and Jill? (1972), as Justine Mahler in Ken Russell's 1974 film Mahler, and as Mrs Cole in the 1996 film Emma, starring Gwyneth Paltrow.

== Personal life ==
She is married to the actor Tim Hardy.

== Filmography ==
=== Film ===
Year	Title	Role	Notes
1970	The Looking Glass War	Chelsea Girl	
1972	What Became of Jack and Jill?	Caller	
1974	Mahler	Justine Mahler	
1976	Meetings, Bloody Meetings	Businesswoman	Video
1987	Maximum Potential	Girl on the Beach	Video
1990	Twisted Justice	Police Officer	
1996	Emma	Mrs Cole	
2004	The Face at the Window	Amy	

=== Television ===
Year	Title	Role	Notes
1969	ITV Playhouse	Brenda	Episode: "Like Puppies in a Basket"
1969–1970	Take Three Girls	Avril	12 episodes
1970	Daniel Deronda	Anna Gascoigne	Episode: "Temptations"
1970	Z-Cars	Eileen Parker	2 episodes
1970	Jackanory	Storyteller	5 episodes
1970	Little Women	Jo March	9 episodes
1971	The Doctors	Audrey	2 episodes
1971	ITV Sunday Night Theatre	Jenny Hopkins	Episode: "Tales of Piccadilly: Out of Town Girl"
1971	Owen, M.D.	Sophie Lowrey	2 episodes
1972	Pathfinders	A.C.W. June Bunting	2 episodes
1972–1973	War and Peace	Maria Bolkonskaya	10 episodes
1974	Shoulder to Shoulder	Sylvia Pankhurst	5 episodes
1975	BBC Play of the Month	Enid / Cordelia	2 episodes
1976	The Glittering Prizes	Joyce Bradley / Joyce Hadleigh	2 episodes
1977	Play for Today	Daphne	Episode: "Do as I Say"
1978	Scorpion Tales	Martha Fredricks	Episode: "Killing"
1980	We, the Accused	Myra Bawne	5 episodes
1981	All's Well That Ends Well	Helena	Television film
1981	It Takes a Worried Man	Lillian	2 episodes
1982	Take Three Women	Avril	2 episodes
1988	Emmerdale	Barbara	4 episodes
1988	The ITV Play	Masha Chekhov	Episode: "Chekhov in Yalta"
1989	Agatha Christie's Poirot	Marjorie Gold	Episode: "Triangle at Rhodes"
1989	The Play on One	Eve	Episode: "Clowns"
1989	Casualty	Liz	Episode: "Union"
1989	Howards' Way	Lee Simons	2 episodes
1990	Capital City	Rachel Lowe	Episode: "Strange Fruits"
1997	The Bill	Esther Guthrie	Episode: "Going Down"
1997, 1998	Kavanagh QC	Angela Beddoes	2 episodes
2000, 2009	Midsomer Murders	Dr. Sylvia Goring / Pru Bennett	2 episodes
