= Black Tulip =

Black Tulip or The Black Tulip may refer to:

- Operation Black Tulip, a 1945 plan to forcibly evict all Germans from the Netherlands
- Black Tulip (Russian: «Чёрный тюльпан»), a nickname for Antonov An-12 transport aircraft used by the Soviet Air Force to repatriate the bodies of deceased soldiers from Afghanistan to the Soviet Union during the Soviet–Afghan War (1979–1989)
- Black Tulip, a common name for the monuments in Russia to commemorate the killed during the Soviet-Afghan War, named after the aircraft
- Black Tulip (Ukrainian:Чорний тюльпан), a Ukrainian volunteer organization whose purpose is to locate the bodies of missing Ukrainian soldiers, and also to exchange the bodies of Russian soldiers for the bodies of Ukrainian soldiers
- The Black Tulip, an 1850 novel written by Alexandre Dumas, father
- The Black Tulip (1921 film), a 1921 Dutch film
- The Black Tulip (1937 film), a 1937 British film
- The Black Tulip (1964 film), a 1964 French film
- The Black Tulip (2010 film), a 2010 American film filmed in Afghanistan
- The Black Tulip Festival, a 1920 German silent historical film

== See also ==
- Impossible Black Tulip (map), (1602 map) the first European-style World map in Chinese
