= The Mind of Mr. Reeder =

- U.S. lobby card
- Directed by: Jack Raymond
- Written by: Marjorie Gaffney; Michael Hogan; Bryan Edgar Wallace
- Based on: The Mind of Mr. J. G. Reeder by Edgar Wallace
- Produced by: Charles Q. Steel
- Starring: Will Fyffe; Kay Walsh; George Curzon
- Cinematography: George Stretton
- Music by: Percival Mackey
- Production company: Jack Raymond Productions
- Distributed by: Grand National Pictures (UK)
- Release date: 13 January 1940
- Running time: 77 minutes
- Country: United Kingdom
- Language: English

The Mind of Mr. Reeder (United States: distributed by Monogram Pictures as The Mysterious Mr. Reeder) is a 1939 British mystery crime film directed by Jack Raymond and starring Will Fyffe, Kay Walsh, George Curzon, and supporting roles for Chili Bouchier, John Warwick and Ronald Shiner. It was written by Marjorie Gaffney, Michael Hogan and Bryan Edgar Wallace, based on a 1925 collection of short stories by Edgar Wallace, and was produced by Jack Raymond Productions at the Highbury Studios in London, with sets designed by the art director James Carter.

Ronald Shiner, Will Fyffe and Jack Raymond were involved in another Mr. Reeder film, The Missing People (1940).

== Plot ==
Reeder, an employee of the Public Prosecutors Department, pursues a gang of counterfeiters.

== Cast ==
- Will Fyffe as J.G. Reeder
- Kay Walsh as Peggy Gillette
- George Curzon as Welford
- Chili Bouchier as Elsa Weford
- John Warwick as Ted Bracher
- Lesley Wareing as Mrs. Gaylor
- Romilly Lunge as Inspector Gaylor
- Betty Astell as Barmaid
- Derek Gorst as Langdon
- Ronald Shiner as Sam Hackett
- Wally Patch as Lomer
- George Hayes as Brady
- Patricia Roc as Doris Bevan

== Reception ==
The Monthly Film Bulletin wrote: "The trouble about this film ... is that in it Mr. Reeder is never allowed to communicate any of the fascinating processes of that mind which must have been the core of Edgar Wallace's book. The result is an uneasy sequence of abrupt episodes, some of them quite good in themselves, in which Will Fyffe neither presents an intelligent study of a detective at work, nor yet is given the chance to exploit the more familiar features of his benevolent personality. A disconnected film in which some good acting in minor parts and an adequate command of technical resources show to little advantage."

Kine Weekly wrote: "Detective melodrama taking the form of a keen, interesting and entertainment essay in calculated crime and swift, stern retribution. The story is from the pen of Edgar Wallace, and the author's inimitable style is faithfully and accurately represented. Authentic interpretation is, in the main, due to Will Fyffe, an ideal selection for the title role; he applies the personal touch, and this collaborates effectively with intimate presentation. It will appeal to all and blend with practically any programme."

The Daily Film Renter wrote: "Plot unfolds suspensefully, with regular Wallace trimmings including cold-blooded killing; backgrounds embrace prison, night-club, race-course and low pub locales, and Fyffe's performance is grand tour de force. Excellent popular offering, with big star and title angles, and a gilt-edged proposition for the showman."
