= The Mind of Mr. J. G. Reeder =

1925 short story collection by Edgar Wallace

First edition (publ. Hodder & Stoughton)

The Mind of Mr. J. G. Reeder is a collection of short stories by the English crime writer Edgar Wallace, published in 1925. (Note: Current practice in UK English is to omit the full stop after "Mr", but Wallace and his publishers included it.)

The stories, which concern a former police officer working for the Director of Public Prosecutions, are:

- "Sheer Melodrama" (also published as "The Man from the East")
- "The Green Mamba" (also published as "The Dangerous Reptile")
- "The Investors"
- "The Poetical Policeman" (also published as "The Strange Case of the Night Watchman" or "The Poet Policeman")
- "The Stealer of Marble"
- "The Strange Case" (also published as "The Weak Spot")
- "The Treasure Hunt"
- "The Troupe" (also published as "A Place on the River")

In the United States the book was titled The Murder Book of Mr. J. G. Reeder and the stories were presented in a different order:

- "The Poetical Policeman"
- "The Treasure Hunt"
- "The Troupe"
- "The Stealer of Marble"
- "Sheer Melodrama"
- "The Green Mamba"
- "The Strange Case"
- "The Investors"

== Adaptations ==
The stories (and other books and stories by Wallace in which Reeder appears) have been adapted for film, television and radio, as follows:

- Mr. Reeder in Room 13, film, 1938 starring Gibb McLaughlin, based on Wallace's novel Room 13
- The Mind of Mr. Reeder, film, 1939 starring Will Fyffe
- The Missing People, film, 1940 starring Will Fyffe, based on another novel by Wallace
- The Mind of Mr. J.G. Reeder, television, 1969−1971 starring Hugh Burden
- The Mind of Mr. J. G. Reeder, radio
