= Ronald Shiner =

British stand-up comedian and comedy actor (1903–1966)

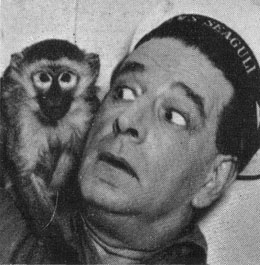
- Born: 8 June 1903; London, England
- Died: 29 June 1966 (aged 63); Hailsham, Sussex, England

Ronald Alfred Shiner (8 June 1903 – 29 June 1966) was a British stand-up comedian and comedy actor whose career encompassed film, West End theatre and music hall.

== Early life and career ==
When he was seventeen, Shiner joined the Royal North-West Mounted Police, after which he became a signalman and a wireless operator, then a farmer. He also worked as a greengrocer, milkman and bookmaker's clerk. He served for three years in the British Army.

Army concerts gave him a taste for the stage. He made his stage debut in 1928 in Dr Syn and the following year became a stage director at the Stage Society. During the early 1930s he appeared in a number of West End plays at the Whitehall Theatre by Walter Hackett including Good Losers, Take a Chance, Afterwards and Road House.

== Film extra ==
Shiner's first film was Wild Boy (1934) with Sonnie Hale and Flanagan & Allen. He had support roles in My Old Dutch (1934), Doctor's Orders (1934) and It's a Bet (1935). He could also be seen in Gentlemen's Agreement (1935), Royal Cavalcade (1935), Squibs (1935), Once a Thief (1935), While Parents Sleep (1935), Line Engaged (1935), Invitation to the Waltz (1936), King of Hearts (1936), Limelight (1936) with Anna Neagle and Arthur Tracy, Excuse My Glove (1936) and Dreaming Lips (1937).

Shiner was in another with Neagle, London Melody (1937), then was in Doctor Syn (1937), The Black Tulip (1937), Beauty and the Barge (1937), and Silver Blaze (1937).

He was uncredited in A Yank at Oxford (1938) and Sidewalks of London (1938), and had bigger parts in They Drive by Night (1938), The Gang's All Here (1939), The Mind of Mr. Reeder (1939), Trouble Brewing (1939) with George Formby, The Nursemaid Who Disappeared (1939), I Killed the Count (1939), Flying Fifty-Five (1939), Discoveries (1939), The Lion Has Wings (1939), Come On George! (1939) with Formby, Bulldog Sees It Through (1940) with Jack Buchanan, The Missing People (1940) with Will Fyffe, The Middle Watch (1940) with Buchanan, Let George Do It! (1940) with Formby, The Case of the Frightened Lady (1940), Spare a Copper (1940) with Formby, Salvage with a Smile (1941), The Seventh Survivor (1941), Old Bill and Son (1941), South American George (1941) with Formby.

On stage he was in Behind the Schemes (1940) and notably Something in the Air (1943–44). He had a popular radio segment Home Town.

Shiner's film parts remained small in They Flew Alone (1942), Those Kids from Town (1942), The Big Blockade (1942), The Black Sheep of Whitehall (1941) with Will Hay, Unpublished Story (1942), Sabotage at Sea (1942), The Young Mr. Pitt (1942), King Arthur Was a Gentleman (1942) with Arthur Askey, The Balloon Goes Up (1943) and The Gentle Sex (1943).

Shiner was fourth billed in Formby's Get Cracking (1943). He had smaller roles in Miss London Ltd. (1943) with Askey, Thursday's Child (1943), My Learned Friend (1943) with Hay, The Butler's Dilemma (1943), and The Night Invader (1943). He was in Askey's Bees in Paradise (1944) and had small roles in I Live in Grosvenor Square (1945) with Neagle, and Caesar and Cleopatra (1945).

== Stage star ==
Shiner's career received a massive boost when he appeared in a stage hit Worm's Eye View which ran from 1945 to 1947. Shiner performed in it over 1,700 times.

On screen, George Formby gave Shiner another good part in George in Civvy Street (1946) and Shiner had a decent role in The Man Within (1947). He was in a children's film Dusty Bates (1947) and had a good part in Forbidden (1949).

Shiner had another huge stage success when he headlined the wartime play Seagulls Over Sorrento (1950–54) which he played for almost 2,000 performances.

== Film stardom ==
His stardom began when he was cast as a drill sergeant in the comedy Reluctant Heroes (1951) which he had played on stage. Directed by Jack Raymond, this was one of the most popular films in British cinemas in 1952. Also popular was Worm's Eye View (1952), the film version of the stage comedy, with Diana Dors, also directed by Raymond. These two films saw Shiner voted Britain's most popular local male star in cinemas in 1952 – having never made the list before.

Shiner made a cameo in The Magic Box (1951) then starred in his third and final film for Raymond Little Big Shot (1952) (Raymond died in 1953).

Shiner remained a star for Top of the Form (1953), directed by John Paddy Carstairs, his first film for the Rank Organisation. He was in Innocents in Paris (1953) with Alastair Sim and supported Margaret Lockwood and two Hollywood names (Wendell Corey and Forrest Tucker) in Laughing Anne (1953). He was voted the third biggest British star of 1953, after Jack Hawkins and Alec Guinness.

At the height of Shiner's career he insured his nose for £10,000 because he said "it's me beak which made 'em larf."

Shiner back to leads for Up to His Neck (1954) with Carstairs, which like several of his films a reworking of 1930s British comedy hits. It was followed by Aunt Clara (1954) with Margaret Rutherford, See How They Run (1955), Keep It Clean (1956), Dry Rot (1956) and My Wife's Family (1956). His role as Badger in Seagulls Over Sorrento was taken by Sid James, although he reprised it for the BBC in 1956 and 1961. He played in My Three Angels on stage in 1955.

== Later career ==
He had a cameo in Carry On Admiral (1957) and was the lead in Not Wanted on Voyage (1957), Girls at Sea (1958) and The Navy Lark (1958). He had a support part in the popular Operation Bullshine (1959) and supported in The Night We Got the Bird (1961).

He was the subject of This Is Your Life in 1958 when he was surprised by Eamonn Andrews at the BBC Television Theatre.

Shiner starred in the London production of Aladdin as Widow Twankey with Bob Monkhouse at the Coliseum in 1960.

On the BBC he was in productions of Seagulls Over Sorrento (1961) and Worm's Eye View (1962). He also made a TV series Send for Shiner.

== Final years ==
In retirement he owned a pub at Blackboys in Sussex. British Pathé News filmed a newsreel of him in his pub, being visited by Jimmy Edwards, in 1954.

Shiner suffered ill health during his last few years. In 1963 he moved from London to Eastbourne for his health. He died in hospital there in June 1966 leaving an estate of £30,955.

== Selected filmography ==
- Doctor's Orders (1934) – Miggs
- My Old Dutch (1934) – (uncredited)
- Wild Boy (1934) – minor role (uncredited)
- Regal Cavalcade (1935, also known as Royal Cavalcade in the United States) – Soldier in Trenches
- Once a Thief (1935) – Alice's Young Man
- Squibs (1935) – Bill
- Line Engaged (1935) – Ryan
- It's a Bet (1935) – Fair Man
- Gentlemen's Agreement (1935) – Jim Ferrin
- Invitation to the Waltz (1935)
- While Parents Sleep (1935)
- Excuse My Glove (1936) – Perky Pat
- King of Hearts (1936) – Tomkins
- Dreaming Lips (1937) – Friend
- The Black Tulip (1937, based on a novel by Alexandre Dumas) – Hendrik
- London Melody (1937) – Pickpocket on Trial (uncredited)
- Beauty and the Barge (1937) – Augustus
- Limelight (1937) – Asst. Stage Manager
- Silver Blaze (1937) – Simpson – the Stable Boy (uncredited)
- Dinner at the Ritz (1937) – Sydney
- Dr Syn (1937, based on a series of novels by Russell Thorndike)
- A Yank at Oxford (1938) – Bicycle Repairman (uncredited)
- The Constant Nymph (1938, TV Movie, based on a novel by Margaret Kennedy)
- Prison Without Bars (1938) – (uncredited)
- Sidewalks of London (1938) – Barman (uncredited)
- They Drive by Night (1938) – Charlie
- Trouble Brewing (1939, based on a novel by Joan Butler) – Bridgewater
- The Mind of Mr. Reeder (1939, based on a novel by Edgar Wallace also known as The Mysterious Mr. Reeder) – Sam Hackett
- The Gang's All Here (1939, also known as The Amazing Mr. Forrest (1943)) – Spider Ferris
- The Nursemaid Who Disappeared (1939) – Detective Smith (uncredited)
- I Killed the Count (1939) – Mullet
- The Missing People (1939, based on a novel by Edgar Wallace) – Sam Hackett
- Flying Fifty-Five (1939, based on the 1922 novel by Edgar Wallace) – Scrubby Oaks
- Discoveries (1939) – Jim Archibald Pike
- Come On George! (1939) – Nat
- The Lion Has Wings (1939) – Minor Role (uncredited)
- The Spider (1940) – (uncredited)
- The Middle Watch (1940) – Engineer
- Let George Do It! (1940) – Musician (uncredited)
- Bulldog Sees It Through (1940) – Pug
- The Case of the Frightened Lady (1940, also known as Frightened Lady based on a play by Edgar Wallace) – Sergeant Totty
- Call a Cop (1940, originally known as Spare a Copper) – Piano Mover (uncredited)
- Salvage with a Smile (1940, Short) – Dustman
- Old Bill and Son (1941) – Bert
- South American George (1941) – Swifty
- The Seventh Survivor (1941) – Ernie
- The Black Sheep of Whitehall (1942) – Porter (uncredited)
- The Big Blockade (1942) – Shipping clerk (uncredited)
- They Flew Alone (1942) – Mechanic
- Unpublished Story (1942) – Agitator
- Sabotage at Sea (1942) – Ernie (the cook)
- The Young Mr. Pitt (1942) – Man in Stocks (uncredited)
- King Arthur Was a Gentleman (1942) – Sergeant
- Those Kids from Town (1942) – Mr. Burns
- The Balloon Goes Up (1942) – Sergeant Shiner
- The Soldier's Food (1942)
- Thursday's Child (1943) – Joe
- The Gentle Sex (1943) – Racegoer
- Get Cracking (1943) – Everett Manley
- Miss London Ltd. (1943) – Sailor Meredith (uncredited)
- My Learned Friend (1943) – Man in Wilson's Bar (uncredited)
- The Butler's Dilemma (1943) – Ernie
- The Night Invader (1943)
- Bees in Paradise (1944) – Ronald Wild
- I Live in Grosvenor Square (1945, also known as A Yank in London (1945)) – Paratrooper #1
- Caesar and Cleopatra (1945, also known as Caesar & Cleopatra in the United States) – 2nd. Porter
- George in Civvy Street (1946) – Fingers
- The Man Within (1947, based on a novel, also known as The Smugglers in the United States) – Cockney Harry
- Dusty Bates (1947) – 'Squeaky' Watts
- Brighton Rock (1948) – Lookout (uncredited)
- Forbidden (1949) – Dan Collins
- Worm's Eye View (1951) – Sam Porter
- The Magic Box (1951) – Fairground Barker
- Reluctant Heroes (1951) – Sgt. Able
- Little Big Shot (1952) – Henry Harkwood
- Top of the Form (1953) – 'Professor' Fortescue
- Innocents in Paris (1953, also known as Weekend-a Paris (1952)) – Dicky
- Laughing Anne (1953) – Nobby Clark
- Up to His Neck (1954) – Jack Carter
- Aunt Clara (1954) – Henry Martin
- See How They Run (1955) – Wally Winton
- Keep It Clean (1956) – Bert Lane
- Dry Rot (1956) – Alf Tubbe
- My Wife's Family (1956) – Doc Knott
- Carry On Admiral (1957) – Salty Simpson
- Not Wanted on Voyage (1957) – Steward Higgins
- Girls at Sea (1958) – Marine Ogg
- Operation Bullshine (1959) – Gunner Slocum
- The Navy Lark (1959) – CPO Banyard
- Upgreen – And at 'Em (1960)
- The Night We Got the Bird (1961) – Cecil Gibson
- BBC Sunday-Night Play (1962, TV Series) – Porter (final appearance)
