= Pertwee =

Pertwee is a surname. Notable people with the surname include:

== Pertwee family of English actors/writers ==
- Roland Pertwee (1885–1963), English writer and actor, father of Jon and Michael and uncle of Bill
- Michael Pertwee (1916–1991), English playwright
- Jon Pertwee (1919–1996), English actor best known as Doctor Who, father of Sean
- Bill Pertwee (1926–2013), English actor best known as the ARP Warden in Dad's Army
- Sean Pertwee (born 1964), English actor
