= The Seventh Survivor =

1942 film

- Directed by: Leslie S. Hiscott
- Screenplay by: Michael Barringer
- Produced by: Elizabeth Hiscott
- Starring: Austin Trevor; Linden Travers; John Stuart
- Cinematography: Basil Emmott
- Production companies: British National Films; Shaftesbury Films
- Distributed by: Anglo-American Film Corporation
- Release date: 5 January 1942
- Running time: 76 minutes
- Country: United Kingdom
- Language: English

The Seventh Survivor is a 1942 British spy war film directed by Leslie S. Hiscott and starring Austin Trevor, Linden Travers and John Stuart. It was produced by British National Films and Shaftesbury Films. Shot in 1941, it was released in January the following year. The film was made at the Riverside Studios in Hammersmith as a second feature.

It was one of several British films of the time that take place predominantly on lighthouses including Tower of Terror and Sabotage at Sea.

== Plot ==
During the Second World War, Sir Edward Norton of British Counterintelligence informs politician Goodenough that all he knows about a German spy in possession of vital information is that he or she is on the ship Santa Maria, bound for Lisbon. However, there is some good news; Sir Edward receives a coded message from the ship's captain, informing him that Lloyd Harrigan, one of his most resourceful agents, is also aboard. Despite being a neutral, the ship is torpedoed.

Six passengers make it to a lifeboat, three men (Robert Cooper, Thomas Pettifer and Toni Anzoni) and three women (Gillian Chase, Mrs. Lindley and Diane Winters). They pick up Oberleutnant Hartzmann, the commander of the now-sunk U-boat, and soon after, reach a lighthouse manned by Sutton and his assistant Ernie. Hartzmann manages to send a message before disabling the wireless, and finds a pistol. Holding the others at gunpoint, he informs them that another U-boat will pick him up in about five hours. He also tells them that he sank their ship because he knew that both Harrigan and the German spy were passengers, and that, based on Harrigan's reputation, the spy would not have reached Lisbon. However, he does not know either person's cover identity. Nobody admits to being either agent. Eventually, Sutton obtains another gun and takes Hartzmann prisoner, handcuffing him and locking him in a room. However, someone passes the keys to Hartzmann's handcuffs and the door, and leaves a revolver outside. Hartzmann shoots the wireless Sutton has repaired and takes control again. Then Cooper turns up dead, struck in the head.

Finally, when Hartzmann announces the U-boat has arrived, Pettifer reveals he is the spy. However, Hartzmann then informs him he is Harrigan, not the unfortunate Cooper. British, not German, naval personnel take Pettifer away.

== Cast ==
- Austin Trevor as Captain Hartzmann
- Linden Travers as Gillian Chase
- John Stuart as Robert Cooper
- Frank Pettingell as Thomas Pettifer
- Martita Hunt as Mrs. Lindley
- Jane Carr as Diane Winters (listed in opening and ending credits as Diane Chase)
- Charles Goldner as Toni Anzoni
- Wally Patch as Sutton
- Ronald Shiner as Ernie
- Felix Aylmer as Sir Elmer Norton
- Henry Oscar as Goodenough
- Ralph Truman as Ship's Captain

== Production ==
Filming started 16 June 1941.

== Bibliography ==
- Chibnall, Steve & McFarlane, Brian. The British 'B' Film. Palgrave MacMillan, 2009.
