= Biffy =

Biffy may refer to:

== People ==
=== Nickname ===
- Amyas Borton (1886–1969), British First World War pilot, air commander and air vice marshal
- Wilfred Dunderdale (1899–1990), British spy and intelligence officer
- Langdon Lea (1874–1937), American football player and coach
- Jay L. Lee (1887–1970), American football player and coach

=== Other people ===
- Count de Biffy, a chess player in the 1786 chess treatise Traité des Amateurs

== Fictional characters ==
- Charles "Biffy" Biffen, the title character of "The Rummy Affair of Old Biffy", a P. G. Wodehouse short story
- Bifford T. "Biffy" Goldstein, a main character in Detentionaire, a Canadian animated series

== Other uses ==
- Biffy Clyro, sometimes shortened to Biffy, a Scottish rock band
- Biffy, a 1920 play written by Vera Beringer and William Ray
- Blackpool Faith Forum for Youth (BIFFY), a Blackpool youth forum
