= Laughing Anne =

1953 film by Herbert Wilcox

- Directed by: Herbert Wilcox
- Written by: Pamela Bower
- Based on: Laughing Anne by Joseph Conrad
- Produced by: Herbert Wilcox
- Starring: Margaret Lockwood; Wendell Corey; Forrest Tucker; Ronald Shiner
- Cinematography: Mutz Greenbaum
- Edited by: Basil Warren
- Music by: Anthony Collins
- Production companies: Republic Pictures; Imperadio Productions
- Distributed by: Republic Pictures (US); British Lion Film Corporation (UK)
- Release date: 19 September 1953
- Running time: 90 minutes
- Countries: United Kingdom; United States
- Language: English

Laughing Anne is a 1953 British adventure film directed by Herbert Wilcox and starring Wendell Corey, Margaret Lockwood, Forrest Tucker, and Ronald Shiner. It was adapted by Pamela Bower from Joseph Conrad's short story, "Because of the Dollars" and from his 1923 two-act play, Laughing Anne.

== Plot ==
In a café, a Polish seaman, Joseph Conrad, tells a story... In the 1880s, a ship's captain called Davidson is left by his wife. He gets drunk and visits Farrell's Bar, where the star attraction is the singer, Laughing Anne. Anne is in an abusive relationship with a man called Jem Farrell.

Anne stows away on Davidson's boat, saying she is leaving Farrell. Anne and Davidson fall for each other, and she reveals her past.

She was a popular singer in Paris, in love with boxer Farrell, who was about to challenge for the world title. Farrell refused to throw the fight, so gangsters mutilated his hands, ending his boxing career.

Davidson proposes to Anne, and they sleep together, but she feels she cannot leave Farrell and she returns to him.

Six years later, Davidson finds Anne again – and her son by Farrell, Davey. Anne discovers a plan by Farrell to steal Davidson's cargo. She warns Davidson, but is killed. Davidson kills Farrell and raises Davey.

== Cast ==
- Wendell Corey as Captain Davidson
- Margaret Lockwood as Laughing Anne
- Forrest Tucker as Jem Farell
- Ronald Shiner as Nobby Clarke
- Robert Harris as Joseph Conrad
- Jacques B. Brunius as Frenchie
- Daphne Anderson as blonde singer
- Helen Shingler as Susan Davidson
- Danny Green as Nicholas
- Harold Lang as Jacques
- Edgar Norfolk as Conrad's companion
- Sean Lynch as David
- Gerard Nolan as Davy
- Joe Powell as Pierre
- Andy Ho as Chinese merchant
- Maurice Bush as Battling Brunius
- Bernard Rebel as pianist
- Julian Sherrier as bartender

== Production ==
In 1952 Herbert Wilcox announced he had signed a co-production deal with Herbert Yates of Republic Pictures to make films together starring Anna Neagle and John Wayne, to be shot in colour and aimed at international markets. The projects would include an adaptation of Daphne du Maurier's The King's General and Joseph Conrad's Laughing Anne.

Laughing Anne would instead be made with Margaret Lockwood, who had signed a long-term contract with Wilcox, and two Hollywood names: Forrest Tucker and Wendell Corey. (Tucker had been under contract to Republic for six years.) As extra box office insurance, Ronald Shiner was cast in a leading role. Lockwood's performance was done in the style of Marlene Dietrich.

The film was shot at Shepperton Studios outside London. The film's sets were designed by the art director William C. Andrews and costumes were by Elizabeth Haffenden.

Lockwood called it "the story of a gay woman who had a very unhappy marriage and love affair, and ends up looking aged and worn. I shudder to remember just what a lifelike job the make-up men did on me for my "aged and worn" scenes."

== Release ==
The film had to be cut for release in the US, including removal of the word "damn" and a scene where Lockwood swam nude.

== Reception ==
The Monthly Film Bulletin wrote: "This is a slow and laboured period drama, the source of which, one may feel, Conrad would have felt reluctance in claiming. What the sketchy script finally uncovers is an unrhythmic series of implausible events which often come perilously close to the absurd. Margaret Lockwood, unhappily cast, and playing in a home-made French accent a part which, in its writing, offers nothing but a laugh and an accent, is more to be pitied than blamed. The banality of the script holds the other players to strictly stock interpretations, with the exception of a talented marmalade cat, whose work enlivens many scenes and is obviously a face to remember."

Kine Weekly wrote: "Powerfully built romantic melodrama. ... The heroine's dilemma, tenderly and excitingly expressed in a brisk succession of skilfully acted, varied and generously framed vignettes, is rich in heart and human in interest. Excellent British booking."

Variety wrote: "Laughing Anne is a stilted, old-fashioned type of adventure drama that will draw a goodly share of laughs where none is intended. Wendell Corey and Forrest Tucker are familiar names for stateside audiences, teaming with Britishers Margaret Lockwood and Ronald Shiner in the starring roles, but there is scant entertainment merit to back up their use in this overlength, slowly-paced offering. Herbert Wilcox produced and directed from a poorly written script by Pamela Bower. Latter fails to capture any of the flavor of Joseph Conrad's story. Admittedly, Conrad is a difficult author to film, but neither the scripter nor Wilcox show much insight. As a consequence, the pace is slow and the entertainment and performances of the programmer variety even though the footage runs 90 minutes."

The New York Times wrote: "Always a man for pictorial respectability, Mr. Wilcox does quite nicely by an unelaborate budget, letting the Technicolor camera play over turn-of-the-century, gaslit rooms, shipboard and island exteriors and interiors. Several shots of a schooner braving awesome jungle waters are excellent. Furthermore, the film is based on a work by that master yarn-spinner and psychological prober, Joseph Conrad. The trimmings remain. But Mr. Wilcox's casual direction and a lusterless adaptation by Pamela Bower compress the story into a plodding reprise of thwarted love, sacrifice and skulduggery... In the most colorless casting, Mr. Corey is quietly effective, Miss Lockwood ranges from skittish to grim, and Mr. Forrest glares or snarls. As a sailor, Ronald Shiner takes care of the humor department. And in the role of Mr. Conrad, no less, a bearded, scholarly-looking actor named Robert Harris hears the story from Mr. Forrest in flashback on the sidelines. This much, undoubtedly, is as it should be."
