= The Man Within (film) =

- British quad poster
- Directed by: Bernard Knowles
- Written by: Sydney Box; Muriel Box
- Based on: the novel by Graham Greene
- Produced by: Muriel Box; Sydney Box
- Starring: Michael Redgrave; Jean Kent; Joan Greenwood; Richard Attenborough
- Cinematography: Geoffrey Unsworth
- Edited by: Alfred Roome
- Music by: Clifton Parker
- Production company: Production Film Service
- Distributed by: General Film Distributors (UK)
- Release date: 2 April 1947 (London)
- Running time: 109 minutes
- Country: United Kingdom
- Language: English
- Budget: £161,800
- Box office: £128,100 (by Dec 1949) or £155,300

The Man Within is a 1947 British, Technicolor, adventure, crime, drama film, directed by Bernard Knowles and starring Ronald Shiner as Cockney Harry, Michael Redgrave, Jean Kent, Joan Greenwood and Richard Attenborough. In the United States, it was released in a slightly shorter version, retitled The Smugglers. It was produced by Triton Films and Production Film Service. The film was also presented by J. Arthur Rank and the Rank Organisation. The film was adapted from the 1929 novel The Man Within by Graham Greene.

== Plot ==
The story is told from the point of view of Seaman Andrews (Richard Attenborough), the ward of 19th-century smuggler chieftain, Carlyon (Michael Redgrave). Feeling persecuted by his stern disciplinarian guardian, Seaman Andrews jumps ship and turns Carlyon over to the customs officials. A deadly fight ensues, during which both Andrews and Carlyon escape and head their separate ways.

Upon befriending the stepson of a customs agent who was killed by Carlyon, Andrews agrees to testify against his onetime friend and protector in court. To bind the bargain, Lucy (Jean Kent), mistress of the Crown's Attorney, has sex with the impressionable, misguided Andrews. Finally realizing that the forces of justice are no more ethical than his fellow smugglers, Andrews refuses to testify against Carlyon, and is himself thrown into prison. However, a happy ending results from all this intrigue.

== Cast ==
- Michael Redgrave as Richard Carlyon
- Jean Kent as Lucy
- Joan Greenwood as Elizabeth
- Richard Attenborough as Francis Andrews
- Francis L. Sullivan as Braddock
- Felix Aylmer as Priest
- Ronald Shiner as Cockney Harry
- Ernest Thesiger as Farne
- David Horne as Dr Stanton
- Ralph Truman as Prison Interrogator
- Allan Jeayes as Judge
- Basil Sydney as Sir Henry Merriman
- Danny Green as Hake
- George Merritt as Hilliard
- Lyn Evans as Warder
- Herbert Lomas as Farmer
- Cyril Chamberlain as Runner
- Charles Rolfe as Court Usher
- Maurice Denham as Smugglers
- Pete Murray
- David Stringer
- John Olson as Junior Counsel
- Torin Thatcher as Jailer

== Reception ==
The film lost an estimated £6,500. According to one account the film earned producer's receipts in the UK of £81,000 and overseas of £74,200.

Greene later described the film as "terrible".
