= Night Was Our Friend =

1951 British film

- Directed by: Michael Anderson
- Written by: Michael Pertwee (play and screenplay)
- Produced by: Gordon Parry
- Starring: Elizabeth Sellars; Michael Gough; Ronald Howard; Marie Ney
- Cinematography: Gerald Gibbs; Moray Grant
- Edited by: Charles Hasse
- Production company: ACT Films
- Distributed by: Monarch Film Corporation
- Release date: December 1951
- Running time: 61 minutes
- Country: United Kingdom
- Language: English

Night Was Our Friend is a 1951 British second feature ('B') drama film directed by Michael Anderson and starring Elizabeth Sellars, Michael Gough and Ronald Howard. It was written by Michael Pertwee based on his 1951 play of the same name. The title references a line from Virgil's epic poem The Aeneid.

== Plot ==
A young woman is acquitted of the murder of her husband, who died in suspicious circumstances. The film then goes into flashback to portray the events leading up to his death. Sally Raynor's aviator husband Martin has been missing for two years and is believed dead, during which time she has fallen in love with a local doctor, John Harper, whom she plans to marry. Martin unexpectedly returns from Brazil still alive after being held captive by an Amazonian tribe and escaping, and witnessing his companions die in the jungle.

Sally decides to give up the doctor and go back to her life with Martin, although their marriage had not been a happy one. Over the next six months his erratic behaviour, brought on by his ordeal, makes Sally believe he is insane. A close friend of the family, Arthur 'Glan' Glanville, also realises this, as does Dr John Harper and the family's housekeeper. Martin's mother also sees his strange behaviour, but chooses to ignore it.

On one of his wild nighttime walks, Martin attacks a man who only survives by chance. Glan finds evidence of this and tells Sally, saying they must immediately get Martin treatment in a mental hospital, to prevent him being sent to jail. Sally asks Martin to agree to treatment, but the thought of losing his freedom, as happened in Brazil, terrifies him, and he begs her to help him by finding another way. Sally plans to kill him with an overdose of sleeping tablets to protect him from society's punishment, but cannot go through with it. Instead, he commits suicide, but Sally is charged with his murder. Glan believes she is innocent, but Martin's mother, despite having seen her son attacking Sally, believes she is guilty. Although innocent of his death, Sally is haunted by guilt and, even after a jury clears her of murder, she is hesitant to marry the doctor she loves.

== Cast ==
- Elizabeth Sellars as Sally Raynor
- Michael Gough as Martin Raynor
- Ronald Howard as Dr John Harper
- Marie Ney as Emily Raynor
- Edward Lexy as Arthur Glanville
- Nora Gordon as Kate
- John Salew as Mr Lloyd
- Cyril Smith as Rogers the reporter
- Cecil Bevan as Clerk of the Court
- Felix Felton as foreman of the jury
- Linda Gray as spinster
- Edie Martin as old lady jury member
- Roger Maxwell as Colonel
- Michael Pertwee as young man

== Production ==
The film was produced by ACT Films at the Viking Studios in Kensington. The film's sets were designed by art director Duncan Sutherland. It was considered above average for a B film, and was shown on the Odeon circuit of cinemas and also given a release in the United States.

== Reception ==
The Monthly Film Bulletin wrote: "A poorly written, stagey and improbable melodrama, told in flashback. With such a script and such obviously limited resources it is probably unfair to comment on the direction. Of the players, Elizabeth Sellars alone suggests that she is worthy of better things."

Picturegoer wrote: "Determinedly sombre, the last ounce of tragedy is wrung out of the story by somewhat ponderous direction. The plot is weakened by improbabilities, but Elizabeth Sellars, as the unfortunate wife, puts in such a good performance that disbelief is dulled. An impressive performance, this. None of the rest of the cast seems too happy, however, but for this a somewhat wooden script and some stilted dialogue must take a certain responsibility. Unusual in its dramatic intensity, the film is intermittently absorbing and at times genuinely moving."

In British Sound Films: The Studio Years 1928–1959 David Quinlan rated the film as "mediocre", writing: "Unrelentingly sombre melodrama, indifferently executed."
