= Martita Hunt =

British actress (1899–1969)

- Hunt in Folly to Be Wise (1953)
- Born: 30 January 1899; Salto, Uruguay
- Died: 13 June 1969 (aged 70); Hampstead, London, England
- Occupation: Actress
- Years active: 1920–1969

Martita Edith Hunt (30 January 1899 – 13 June 1969) was a British theatre and film actress. She had a dominant stage presence and played a wide range of powerful characters. She is best remembered for her performance as Miss Havisham in David Lean's Great Expectations (1946).

== Early life ==
Hunt was born in Salto, Uruguay on 30 January 1899 to English parents Alfred and Marta (née Burnett) Hunt. Aged ten, she travelled with her parents to the United Kingdom, where she attended Queenwood Ladies' College in Eastbourne, and then trained as an actress.

== Career ==
=== Early theatrical career ===
Hunt began her acting career in repertory theatre in Liverpool before moving to London. She first appeared there in the Stage Society's production of Ernst Toller's The Machine Wreckers at the Kingsway Theatre in May 1923. From 1923 to 1929, she appeared as the Principessa della Cercola in W. Somerset Maugham's Our Betters (Globe, 1924) and as Mrs. Linde in Ibsen's A Doll's House (Playhouse, 1925) in the West End, along with engagements at club theatres such as the Q Theatre and the Arts Theatre and a short 1926 Chekhov season at the small Barnes Theatre under Theodore Komisarjevsky (playing Charlotta Ivanovna, in The Cherry Orchard and Olga in Three Sisters).

In September 1929, she joined the Old Vic company, then led by Harcourt Williams, and, during the following eight months played Béline in Molière's The Imaginary Invalid, Queen Elizabeth in George Bernard Shaw's The Dark Lady of the Sonnets, and Lavinia in Shaw's Androcles and the Lion. However, her time there was more noted for a succession of Shakespearean roles: the Nurse in Romeo and Juliet, Portia in The Merchant of Venice, the Queen in Richard II, Helena in A Midsummer Night's Dream, Portia in Julius Caesar), Rosalind in As You Like It, Lady Macbeth in Macbeth, and Gertrude in Hamlet). The latter three were with John Gielgud.

In Hunt's entry in the Oxford Dictionary of National Biography, Donald Roy wrote:

"With an arresting appearance and a dominant stage presence, she proved most effective as strong, tragic characters, her Gertrude in Hamlet being accounted by some critics the finest they had seen."

She then returned to the West End (briefly returning to the Old Vic to play Emilia in the 1938 Othello), notably playing Edith Gunter in Dodie Smith's Autumn Crocus (Lyric, 1931), the Countess of Rousillon in All's Well That Ends Well (Arts, 1932), Lady Strawholme in Ivor Novello's Fresh Fields (Criterion, 1933), Liz Frobisher in John Van Druten's The Distaff Side (Apollo, 1933), Barbara Dawe in Clemence Dane's Moonlight Is Silver (Queen's, 1934), Theodora in Elmer Rice's Not for Children (Fortune, 1935), Masha in Chekhov's The Seagull (New Theatre, 1936), the Mother in an English-language version of García Lorca's Bodas de sangre ("Marriage of Blood"; Savoy, 1939), Léonie in Jean Cocteau's Les Parents Terribles (Gate, 1940), Mrs Cheveley in Oscar Wilde's An Ideal Husband (Westminster, 1943), and Cornelia in John Webster's The White Devil (Duchess, 1947).

=== Early film career ===
Hunt also appeared in many supporting roles in several popular British films, such as Good Morning, Boys (1937), Trouble Brewing (1939), and The Man in Grey (1943). The Wicked Lady (1945) was an international success, but her next film role in David Lean's Great Expectations (1946) would be her most famous and most lauded. As Miss Havisham, she reprised her role from the 1939 stage adaptation by Alec Guinness, which provided the inspiration and template for Lean's film. Her performance met with significant acclaim, and Roger Ebert later wrote in 1999 that she "dominate[d] the [film's] early scenes, playing Miss Havisham as a beak-nosed, shabby figure, bedecked in crumbling lace and linen, not undernourished despite her long exile."

=== Later career ===
Hunt acted in The Sleeping Prince in 1953 at the Phoenix Theatre. From this time on, she divided her time between British and American films, as well as the stage. She won a Tony Award in 1949 for her Broadway début as Countess Aurelia in the English-speaking première of Giraudoux's The Madwoman of Chaillot (though she had relatively less impact on the production's 1952 tour). Her last stage role was as Angélique Boniface in Hotel Paradiso, an adaptation from Feydeau, again with Guinness at the Winter Garden Theatre in May 1956.

Other films in which she appeared included Anna Karenina (1948), The Fan (1949), Anastasia (1956), Three Men in a Boat (1956), The Admirable Crichton (1957), The Brides of Dracula (1960), The Wonderful World of the Brothers Grimm (1962), Becket (1964), The Unsinkable Molly Brown (1964) and Bunny Lake Is Missing (1965). She also appeared on television as Lady Bastable in several adaptations of the Saki stories (1962).

== Death ==
Martita Hunt died of bronchial asthma at her home in Primrose Hill, London, aged 70, on 13 June 1969. Her estate was valued at £5,390. She never married.

She was cremated at Golders Green Crematorium on 19 June. Her ashes lie in the Ivor Novello Rose Bed.

== Selected filmography ==
- A Rank Outsider (1920)
- Service for Ladies (1932) as Aline – Countess Ricardi's M=maid (uncredited)
- Love on Wheels (1932) as piano demonstrator
- I Was a Spy (1933) as Aunt Lucille
- Friday the Thirteenth (1933) as Agnes Lightfoot
- Too Many Millions (1934) as Mrs Pilcher
- Mr. What's-His-Name? (1935) as Mrs Davies
- The Case of Gabriel Perry (1935) as Mrs Read
- Man of the Moment (1935) as roulette player
- First a Girl (1935) as Seraphina
- King of the Damned (1935) as woman on plane (uncredited)
- When Knights Were Bold (1936) as Aunt Esther
- Pot Luck (1936) as Mrs Cream
- Tudor Rose (1936) as Jane's mother
- The Interrupted Honeymoon (1936) as Nora Briggs
- The Beloved Vagabond (1936) as Lady with lorgnettes (uncredited)
- Sabotage (1936) as Miss Chatham – the Professor's daughter (uncredited)
- The Mill on the Floss (1936) as Mrs Glegg
- Good Morning, Boys (1937) as Lady Bogshott
- Farewell Again (1937) as Adela Swayle
- Paradise for Two (1937) as Mme Bernard (uncredited)
- Second Best Bed (1938) as Mrs Mather
- Strange Boarders (1938) as Miss Pitter
- Prison Without Bars (1938) as Mme Appel
- Everything Happens to Me (1938)
- Trouble Brewing (1939) as Mme Berdi
- The Nursemaid Who Disappeared (1939) as Lady Alice Ballister
- A Girl Must Live (1939) as Mme Dupont, assistant
- Goodbye, Mr. Chips (1939) as British tourist on bicycle (uncredited)
- Young Man's Fancy (1939) as Duchess of Beaumont
- Old Mother Riley Joins Up (1939) as Commandant
- At the Villa Rose (1940) as Helen Vaquier
- The Middle Watch (1940) as Lady Elizabeth Hewett
- The Good Old Days (1940) as Sara Macaulay
- Tilly of Bloomsbury (1940) as Lady Marion Mainwaring
- Freedom Radio (1941) as Frau Lehmann the concierge
- Quiet Wedding (1941) as Mme Mirelle
- East of Piccadilly (1941) as Ma
- The Seventh Survivor (1942) as Mrs Lindley
- They Flew Alone (1942) as Miss Bland
- Lady from Lisbon (1942) as Susan Wellington-Smythe
- Sabotage at Sea (1942) as Daphne Faber
- Talk About Jacqueline (1942) as Colonel's wife (uncredited)
- The Importance of Being Earnest (1943) as Lady Bracknell
- The Man in Grey (1943) as Miss Patchett
- Welcome, Mr. Washington (1944) as Miss Finch
- The Wicked Lady (1945) as Cousin Agatha
- Great Expectations (1946) as Miss Havisham
- The Ghosts of Berkeley Square (1947) as Lady Mary
- The Little Ballerina (1947) as Miss Crichton
- Anna Karenina (1948) as Princess Betty Tversky
- So Evil My Love (1948) as Mrs Courtney
- My Sister and I (1948) as Mrs Camelot
- The Fan (1949) as Duchess of Berwick
- The Story of Robin Hood and His Merrie Men (1952) as Queen Eleanor
- Treasure Hunt (1952) as Aunt Anna Rose
- Meet Me Tonight (1952) as Mabel Grace
- It Started in Paradise (1952) as Mme Alice
- Folly to Be Wise (1953) as Lady Dodd
- Melba (1955) as Mme Marchesi
- King's Rhapsody (1955) as Queen Mother
- The March Hare (1956) as Lady Anne
- Anastasia (1956) as Baroness Elena von Livenbaum
- Three Men in a Boat (1956) as Mrs Willis
- The Admirable Crichton (1957) as Lady Brocklehurst
- Les Espions (1957) as Connie Harper
- Dangerous Exile (1957) as Lady Lydia Fell
- Bonjour tristesse (1958) as Philippe's mother
- Me and the Colonel (1958) as Mother Superior
- La prima notte (1959) as Lisa Bradwell
- Bottoms Up (1960) as Lady Gore-Willoughby
- The Brides of Dracula (1960) as Baroness Meinster
- Song Without End (1960) as Grand Duchess
- Mr. Topaze (1961) as Baroness
- The Wonderful World of the Brothers Grimm (1962) as Anna Richter (story teller)
- Becket (1964) as Empress Matilda
- The Unsinkable Molly Brown (1964) as Grand Duchess Elise Lupavinova
- Bunny Lake Is Missing (1965) as Ada Ford
- The Best House in London (1969) as Headmistress (final film role)

== Sources ==
- Who Was Who in the Theatre, 1912–1976, 2 (1978), pp. 1241–2
- W. Rigdon, The Biographical Encyclopedia (1966), p. 556
- D. Quinlan, The Illustrated Directory of Film Character Actors (1985), p. 152
- S. D'Amico, ed., Enciclopedia dello spettacolo, 11 vols. (Rome, 1954–68)
- P. Hartnoll, ed., The Concise Oxford Companion to the Theatre (1972), p. 259
- The Times (14 June 1969), pp. 1, 10
- J. Willis, ed., Theatre World, 26 (1970), pp. 268–9
- F. Gaye, ed., Who's Who in the Theatre, 14th edn (1967), pp. 769–70
- E. M. Truitt, Who Was Who on Screen, 3rd edn (1983), 360
- The Guardian (14 June 1969), p. 5
- R. May, A Companion to the Theatre (1973), p. 110
- J.-L. Passek, ed., Dictionnaire du cinéma (1991), p. 334
