= They Came by Night =

1940 film

- Directed by: Harry Lachman
- Written by: Sidney Gilliat; Michael Hogan; Frank Launder; Roland Pertwee
- Based on: They Came by Night by Barré Lyndon
- Produced by: Edward Black
- Starring: Will Fyffe; Phyllis Calvert; Anthony Hulme
- Cinematography: Jack E. Cox
- Edited by: R. E. Dearing
- Music by: Louis Levy; Charles Williams
- Production company: Gainsborough Pictures
- Distributed by: 20th Century Fox
- Release date: 7 March 1940
- Running time: 72 minutes
- Country: United Kingdom
- Language: English

They Came by Night is a 1940 British second feature ('B') crime film directed by Harry Lachman and starring Will Fyffe, Phyllis Calvert and Anthony Hulme. It was written by Sidney Gilliat, Michael Hogan, Frank Launder and Roland Pertwee based on the West End play of the same title by Barré Lyndon.

It was one of several starring vehicles for Fyffee and a key early role for Calvert.

== Synopsis ==
The screenplay concerns a man who is blackmailed into taking his brother's place in a gang for a jewellery heist.

== Cast ==
- Will Fyffe as James Fothergill
- Phyllis Calvert as Sally
- Anthony Hulme as Sergeant Tolly
- George Merritt as Inspector Metcalfe
- Kathleen Harrison as Mrs. Lightbody
- John Glyn-Jones as Llewellyn Jones
- Athole Stewart as Lord Netfherly
- Cees Laseur as Vollaire
- Hal Walters as Hopkins
- Kuda Bux as Ali
- Leo Britt as George
- Sylvie St. Clair as Claire
- Wally Patch as Bugsie
- Kenneth More as police driver (uncredited)

== Production ==
The film was made at the Islington Studios by Gainsborough Pictures and released by 20th Century Fox. The film's sets were designed by the art director Alex Vetchinsky.

== Reception ==
The Monthly Film Bulletin wrote: "The story is not without loose ends, but it provides a ready-to-measure part for Will Fyffe. He plays it with skill and good effect. There is an exciting climax and (except for those who dislike drunkenness under any circumstances) a really funny scene when the teetotal mechanic tests the effect of alcohol. The supporting players make a workmanlike team, but the juvenile leads are obviously inexperienced, and not quite up to their parts. The technical presentation is satisfactory."

Variety wrote: "The story is sluggish and the direction of Harry Lachman leaves much to be desired. Real drawback is in the technical division, especially the photography and the obviously poor raw stock used. Fyffe is excellent, as usual."

The Daily Film Renter wrote: "Appealing interpretation of elderly jeweller's forced excursion into robbery to revenge dead brother by Will Fyffe, in leisurely-told and occasionally unconvincing crook thriller. Suspenseful police pursuit finale. Hilarious drinking bout interlude, and satisfactory light romantic side-issue. Worthy support."
