= My Old Dutch (1934 film) =

1934 film

- Florrie Forde and Betty Balfour in a scene set in the 1890s
- Directed by: Sinclair Hill
- Written by: Leslie Arliss; Marjorie Gaffney; Michael Hogan; Mary Murillo; Bryan Edgar Wallace
- Based on: My Old Dutch, a 1919 play by Albert Chevalier and Arthur Shirley
- Produced by: Ivor Montagu
- Starring: Betty Balfour; Gordon Harker; Florrie Forde
- Cinematography: Leslie Rowson
- Edited by: Derek N. Twist
- Music by: Jack Beaver; Louis Levy
- Production company: Gainsborough Pictures
- Distributed by: Gaumont British Distributors
- Release date: 12 October 1934
- Running time: 82 minutes
- Country: United Kingdom
- Language: English

My Old Dutch is a 1934 British drama film directed by Sinclair Hill and starring Betty Balfour, Gordon Harker, Michael Hogan and Florrie Forde. It was written by Leslie Arliss, Marjorie Gaffney, Michael Hogan, Mary Murillo and Bryan Edgar Wallace based on the 1919 play of the same title byAlbert Chevalier and Arthur Shirley. It was made at Islington Studios by Gainsborough Pictures with sets designed by Peter Proud.

The film portrays the lives of Londoners during the First World War.

== Synopsis ==
The film covers forty years in the life of a cockney couple's son as he marries a rich man's disowned daughter and ultimately dies in the Royal Flying Corps.

== Cast ==
- Betty Balfour as Lil
- Gordon Harker as Ernie
- Michael Hogan as Bert
- Florrie Forde as Aunt Bertha
- Mickey Brantford as Jim
- Glennis Lorimer as Valerie Paraday
- Peter Gawthorne as Mr Paraday
- Frank Pettingell as Uncle Alf
- Robert Nainby as Grandpa
- Bill Shine as cousin 'arry
- Finlay Currie as Mo
- Felix Aylmer as Judge
- John Singer as Jim as a child
- Ronald Shiner

== Reception ==
Kine Weekly wrote: "Suggested by Albert Chevalier's famous song, this Cockney cavalcade represents good honest entertainment right down the street of the average picturegoer. The story covers forty years of connubial bliss, and the major national and economic events of the period are employed with resourceful showmanship to frame the human sentiment, clean drama and rich humour with which the theme abounds."

The Daily Film Renter wrote: "Cavalcade of forty years of cockney life, inspired by Albert Chevalier's famous ballad. ... Leavened with typical cockney humours, film has moving emotional angles, and gives Betty Balfour chance to make impressive 'comeback' in role from girlhood to grey hairs. Gordon Harker supplies amusing study as fruit hawker. Cast-iron booking for popular halls, with big title exploitation values."
