= Esme Beringer =

English actress and fencer (1875–1972)

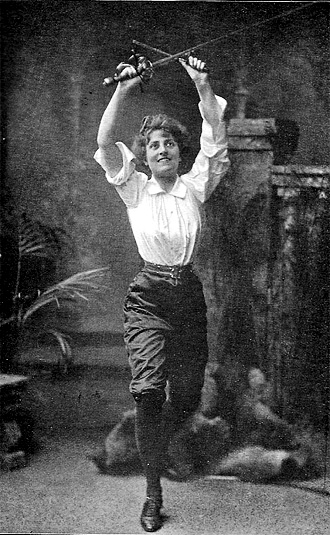
Esme Beringer in At the Sword's Point, Palace Theatre 1901

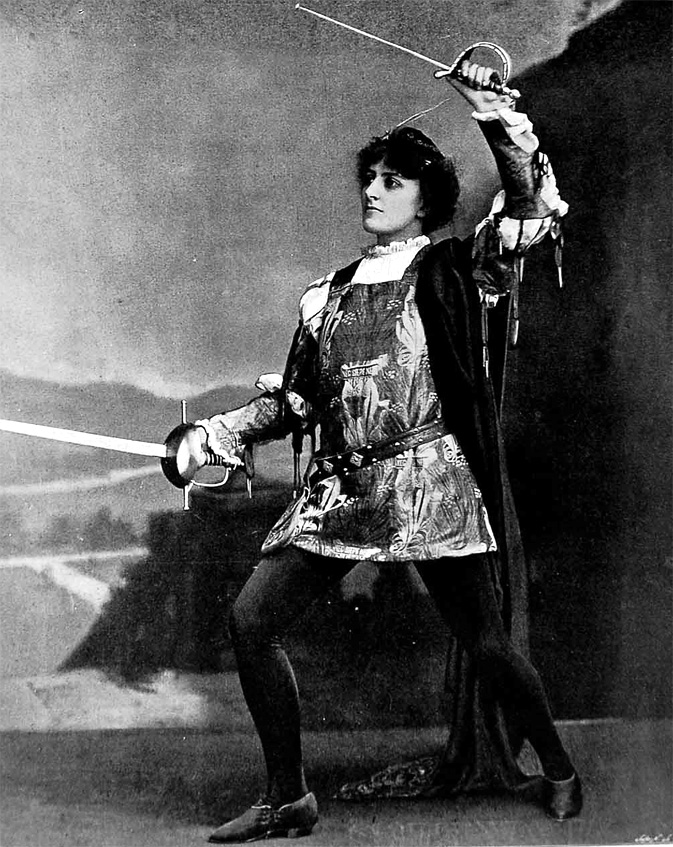
Esme Beringer 1901

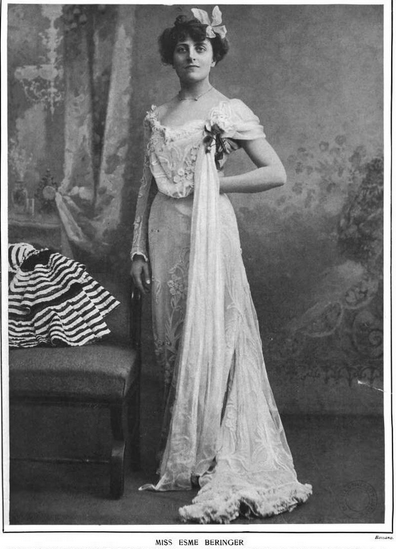
Esme Beringer in a gown, from a 1903 publication.

Esme Beringer (5 September 1875 – 31 March 1972) was an English actress who was noted for her fencing skills.

== Early life ==
Esme Beringer was born in London, the daughter of pianist Oscar Beringer and novelist and playwright Aimée Daniell Beringer. Her younger sister Vera Beringer was best known as a child actress. Her brother Guy Beringer was a journalist; he is credited with coining the word "brunch" in 1895.

== Career ==
Esme Beringer first appeared on stage in 1888, as a boy character, Dick Tipton, in Little Lord Fauntleroy (she also substituted for the title character, usually played by her sister). By 1893 she was very active on the London stage. Beringer's athletic physique and extensive training with swords made her well-suited to breeches roles, as when she played Romeo in 1896 (opposite her sister Vera as Juliet). Other stage appearances by Beringer included The Prince and the Pauper (1890), Foreign Policy (1893, by Arthur Conan Doyle), Bud and Blossom (1893, by Gertrude Elizabeth Blood), Three Wayfarers (1893, by Thomas Hardy), Bess (1893), Hypatia (1893), The Gentleman Whip, The New Boy, Loyal, Hal the Highwayman, The Lady's Idol, The Strange Adventures of Miss Brown, The Benefit of the Doubt, The Late Mr. Castello, Gossip (1896), A Mother of Three, Woman's World, The Pilgrim's Progress, The Last of his Race, The Winter's Tale, Saviolo (1899, by Egerton Castle), The Trifler (1905), The Anarchist (1908), The Blue Stockings (1913), and Lucky Jim (1916). She also performed in vaudeville, in The Point of the Sword.

Beringer was an enthusiastic fencer who studied historical swordplay with Alfred Hutton as well as his colleague Egerton Castle and was likely a member of the Bartitsu Club. She participated in a number of historical fencing lectures and displays during the 1890s and early 1900s and also taught classes for the "Actresses' Foil Club" during World War I. After the war, she starred in more Shakespearean roles, including "Constance" in King John (1925) opposite Henry Baynton.

Esme Beringer's film appearances included All the World's a Stage (1917), The October Man (1947), Something in the City (1950), and Castle in the Air (1952). She also made some early television appearances, in Craven House (1950), and The Monster of Killoon (1952, by Geoffrey Kerr).

== Personal life ==
Esme Beringer died in 1972, aged 96 years.
