= Something in the City =

1950 British film by Maclean Rogers

- Theatrical release poster
- Directed by: Maclean Rogers
- Written by: H. F. Maltby; Michael Pertwee
- Produced by: Ernest G. Roy
- Starring: Richard Hearne; Garry Marsh; Ellen Pollock; Betty Sinclair
- Cinematography: Geoffrey Faithfull
- Edited by: Charles Hasse
- Music by: Wilfred Burns
- Production company: Nettlefold Studios
- Distributed by: Butcher's Film Service
- Release date: September 1950
- Running time: 76 minutes
- Country: United Kingdom
- Language: English

Something in the City is a 1950 British comedy film directed by Maclean Rogers and starring Richard Hearne, Garry Marsh and Ellen Pollock. It was written by H. F. Maltby and Michael Pertwee. It includes an early uncredited performance by Stanley Baker as a police constable.

== Plot ==
Mr Ningle has been living a lie for seven years by pretending to still be commuting to his financial services job in the City of London from which he had been sacked. Every day, he journeys in and changes into the disguise of his alter ego: an artist who sells paintings on the pavement in Trafalgar Square.

His life is thrown into turmoil when his deception is nearly discovered by Mr. Holley, the father of his daughter Beryl's new fiancé, Richard. The father happens to be the managing editor of the Evening Courier newspaper, and worried about his prospective in-laws. A series of misunderstandings lead to the mistaken belief that Ningle has been murdered by "Artie the artist", leading to a massive police manhunt. Ningle manages to stage a fake suicide for Artie, while he reappears and pretends he had amnesia for the past 48 hours.

When Holley publishes an offer of a large sum to Artie by way of apology (having heard that he committed suicide), Ningle cannot resist "resurrecting" the artist, but Holley now suspects the truth. Ningle manages to outmanoeuvre him, however, and presents the money to Beryl and Richard, enabling them to marry despite the opposition of Richard's parents.

== Cast ==
- Richard Hearne as Mr. Ningle
- Garry Marsh as Mr. Holley
- Ellen Pollock as Mrs. Holley
- Betty Sinclair as Mrs. Ningle
- Tom Gill as Richard [Holley]
- Diana Calderwood as Beryl [Ningle]
- Bill Shine as reporter
- Dora Bryan as waitress
- Molly Weir as Nellie
- George Merritt as Police Inspector
- Horace Kenney as squeaker man
- Stanley Vilven as news vendor
- Gerald Rex as map seller
- Vi Kaley as old Vera
- Ben Williams as policeman
- Esme Beringer as Miss Prouncey
- Kenneth Henry as city man
- Mackenzie Ward as Chelsea artist
- Stanley Baker as policeman (uncredited)

== Production ==
The film was made at Nettlefold Studios in Walton-on-Thames and on location around London. It was distributed by Butcher's Film Service.

== Critical reception ==
The Daily Film Renter wrote: "Slapstick farce, with abundance of laughable situations of a popular nature. ... Antics of principal star, who leads a double life, calculated to keep the risible faculties well employed. Box office value: mirthmaker with some rather original material. Excellent light feature."

Picturegoer wrote: "Richad Hearne, the English stage comedian, famous for his solo Lancers dancing act, has had very few breaks on the screen, but in this British film he is given quite a number of opportunities to display his versatility and, what's more, he seizes them all. ... A well-balanced "one man" show, it thoroughly amuses without taxing the intelligence."

Picture Show wrote: "Fast moving, with some really funny situations and a delightfully comic characterisation by Richard Hearne."

The Radio Times Guide to Films gave the film 2/5 stars, writing: "After 40 years as a circus clown and music-hall comic, Richard Hearne finally found fame on TV as the fumbling old fool, Mr Pastry. But the performer was less fond of the character to whom he owed his fortune than the public, and Hearne frequently sought to escape from the corny slapstick of his children's shows. Here, he plays a pavement artist who convinces his wife he is a high financier. The cheery street folk simply don't ring true and the pathos makes Chaplin look like a cynic."

In British Sound Films: The Studio Years 1928–1959 David Quinlan rated the film as "average", writing: "Harmless comedy"
