= The Butler's Dilemma =

1943 British film by Leslie S. Hiscott

- Opening titles
- Directed by: Leslie S. Hiscott
- Written by: Michael Barringer
- Produced by: Elizabeth Hiscott; Graham Cutts
- Starring: Richard Hearne; Francis L. Sullivan; Judy Kelly; Hermione Gingold
- Cinematography: James Wilson
- Edited by: Erwin Reiner
- Music by: John Blore Borelli (as John Blore)
- Production company: Shaftesbury Films
- Distributed by: Anglo-American Film Corporation
- Release date: 29 November 1943 (UK)
- Running time: 83 minutes
- Country: United Kingdom
- Language: English

The Butler's Dilemma is a 1943 black-and-white British comedy film directed by Leslie S. Hiscott and starring Richard Hearne, Ronald Shiner as Ernie, Ian Fleming, Francis L. Sullivan, Judy Kelly and Hermione Gingold. It was produced by Elisabeth Hiscott and Graham Cutts for Shaftesbury Films, and filmed at British National Studios.

== Plot ==
A group of friends undertakes a number of deceptions in order to stage an illicit gambling party. Wimpish Rodney Playfair is persuaded, by a promise to erase his gambling debts, to impersonate an old manservant named Chapman for a few weeks in order to unwittingly provide an alibi for an accomplished thief.

== Cast ==
- Richard Hearne as Rodney Playfair / Chapman the butler
- Francis L. Sullivan as Leo Carrington
- Judy Kelly as Ann
- Hermione Gingold as Aunt Sophie
- Henry Kendall as Carmichael
- André Randall as Vitello
- Ian Fleming as Sir Hubert Playfair
- Ralph Truman as Bishop
- Wally Patch as Tom
- Ronald Shiner as Ernie
- Marjorie Rhodes as Mrs Plumb
- Arthur Denton as detective
- Alf Goddard as policeman

== Critical reception ==
The Monthly Film Bulletin wrote: "At least one viewer found it difficult to make head or tail of the story at all, even with the wide licence extended to farce, and came away with the conviction that he had seen one of the silliest films ever made."

Kine Weekly wrote: "Richard Hearne has some excellent chances to Indulge his own particular brand of acrobatic humour, Judy Kelly sings, Hermione Gingold puts over the sophisticated brand of wisecracking that has made her famous."

TV Guide gave the film two out of five stars, calling it, "Terribly tepid."
