= Oscar Beringer =

English pianist and teacher

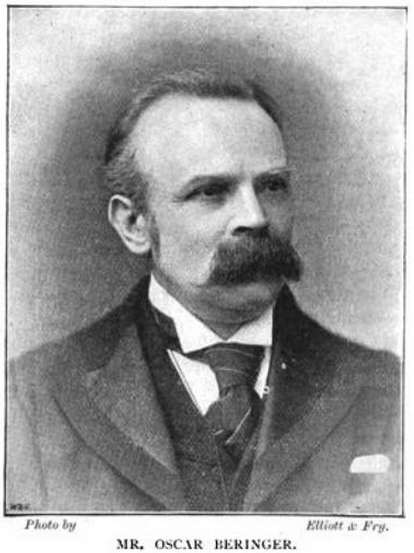

Oscar Beringer (14 July 1844 – 21 February 1922) was an English pianist and teacher of German descent.

Beringer was born in Furtwangen in the Black Forest, but by 1849 he had moved to London when his father became a political refugee. Due to impoverished circumstances he was largely self taught (on a borrowed piano with lessons from his sister) until he was 19, but made several appearances as a piano soloist at the Crystal Palace Saturday Concerts in 1859-60.

At the age of 19 Beringer began a course of systematic training as a pupil of Ignaz Moscheles in Leipzig, and Carl Tausig in Berlin. In 1869 he was appointed professor at Tausig's Schule des höheren Clavierspiels in Berlin, but he returned to London in 1871. By 1873 he had established the Oscar Beringer Academy for the Higher Development of Pianoforte Playing, initially from a small house in Great Marlborough Street, then at 12 Hinde Street off Manchester Square, and later at 40 Wigmore Street in London. It was organized on the model of Tausig's school. From 1885 he was also a professor at the Royal Academy of Music. Although very successful, the Oscar Beringer Academy closed its doors in 1897.

On 14 October 1882 Beringer was the soloist in Brahms's Second Piano Concerto for its first performance in England, and he was also the first to perform Dvorak's Piano Concerto in G minor, Op. 33 in England, at the Crystal Palace on 13 October 1883. As well as performing, teaching and examining, Beringer was also a composer, mostly of educational piano pieces. His Daily Technical Studies for Pianoforte were first published in 1889 and have remained in print. But there were also concert works, including an Andante and Allegro for piano and orchestra (performed in 1880) six piano sonatinas (published 1894) and some songs.

Beringer's pupils included Hubert Bath, Gordon Bryan, Winifred Christie, Ambrose Coviello, Herbert Fryer, Katharine Goodson, Violet Gordon-Woodhouse, Adolph Hallis, Cécile Hartog, Lionel Wendt and Walter Wesché. He wrote Fifty Years' Experience of Pianoforte Teaching and Playing in 1907. He was also Director of the Philharmonic Society.

Beringer married the American-born playwright, theatrical manager, novelist, and commentator Aimée Daniell in 1873. She was billed professionally as Mrs. Oscar Beringer. Among their five children were actresses Esme Beringer and Vera Beringer, who both appeared in productions of their mother's plays. Their son Guy Beringer was a journalist. Aimée died in 1936.
