= The River Wolves =

- Helga Moray and John Mills in the film.
- Directed by: George Pearson
- Written by: Edward Dignon (play); Geoffrey Swaffer (play); Terence Egan
- Produced by: Julius Hagen
- Starring: Helga Moray; Michael Hogan; John Mills
- Cinematography: Ernest Palmer
- Production company: Real Art Productions
- Distributed by: RKO Radio Pictures
- Release date: 18 June 1934
- Running time: 56 minutes
- Country: United Kingdom
- Language: English

The River Wolves (also known as Lion and Lamb) is a 1934 British crime film, directed by George Pearson and starring Helga Moray, Michael Hogan and John Mills. It was written by Terence Egan based on a play by Edward Dignon and Geoffrey Swaffer, and produced at Twickenham Studios as a quota quickie.

== Preservation status ==
The British Film Institute National Archive holds a collection of ephemera and stills but no film or video materials.

== Plot ==
Captain David Guest, a sailor with a fearsome reputation, befriends young Peter Farrell, from a wealthy family, who has got involved with crook Flash Lawson. Believing he has killed a man, Farrell is holed up in a riverside pub, waiting for Lawson to smuggle him out of the country. Guest is kidnapped by Lawson, but escapes and has him arrested, and clears Farrell of the murder charge by revealing the alleged victim to be alive and well.

== Cast ==
- Helga Moray as Moira Clare
- Michael Hogan as Captain David Guest
- John Mills as Peter Farrell
- Ben Welden as Flash Lawson
- Hope Davey as Heather Patton
- Martin Walker as Trevor Rowe
- Norman Shelley as Jim Spiller
- D.J. Williams as Tod
- Mark Daly as Jock Brodie
- Edgar Driver as George
- Barbara Everest

== Reception ==
Kine Weekly wrote: "Hearty British melodriama, placed agamst realistic waterfront backgroands. The story, although good, takes some time to get into its stride, but after the slow opening the picture gets well under way and rides steadily to a hectic climax. The principal players acquit themselves adequately."

The Daily Film Renter wrote: "First reels are tedious, but action picks up towards climax ... Helga Moray gives good performance as vamp, while Mark Daly is amusingly alcoholic. For the masses."

Picturegoer wrote: "It is one of those pictures which if not taken seriously provides quite fair entertainment."
