= Kay Walsh =

English actress and dancer (1911–2005)

- Walsh in Lease of Life (1954)
- Born: Kathleen Walsh; 15 November 1911; Chelsea, London, England
- Died: 16 April 2005 (aged 93); Chelsea, London, England
- Occupations: Actress, dancer, writer
- Years active: 1934–1981
- Spouses: David Lean (m. 1940; div. 1949) Elliott Jaques (m. 1953; div. 1956)

Kathleen Walsh (15 November 1911 – 16 April 2005) was an English actress, dancer, and screenwriter. Her film career prospered after she met her future husband, film director David Lean, with whom she worked on productions such as In Which We Serve and Oliver Twist.

== Early life and career ==
Walsh was born on 15 November 1911 in Chelsea, London. She was raised in Pimlico by her grandmother. She began her career as a dancer in West End music halls, and at the age of 17 she began going out with Pownoll Pellew (later 9th Viscount Exmouth), and they shared an interest in sports cars. She made her film debut in How's Chances? (1934) in a small part, and had a larger role in Get Your Man, another 1934 film. She continued to act in "quota quickies" films for several years. Walsh first met David Lean, then a film editor, in 1936, during the filming of Secret of Stamboul. They began a relationship, and Walsh broke her engagement to Pellew. Walsh and Lean married on 23 November 1940. She appeared in the films In Which We Serve (1942) and This Happy Breed (1944), both directed by Lean and written by Noël Coward. Walsh campaigned for Lean to receive co-director credit on In Which We Serve.

Walsh contributed dialogue to the 1938 film of Pygmalion, and devised the scenario for the closing sequence of Lean's film adaptation of Great Expectations (1946), receiving a writing credit on the latter film. She devised the opening sequence of Lean's adaptation of Oliver Twist (1948) and played Nancy. Walsh and Lean divorced in 1949 on grounds of infidelity based on Lean's relationship with actress Ann Todd. Walsh continued to work as a character actress in films through the 1950s, including films with Alfred Hitchcock and Ronald Neame. Her own favourite film role was that of the barmaid Miss D. Coker in Neame's 1958 film of The Horse's Mouth, with Alec Guinness.

Between films, Walsh appeared regularly in plays and farces at the Strand and Aldwych theatres, directed by Basil Dean. She starred with Peter Coke in the 1938 thriller Death on the Table and Ralph Lynn at Aldwych in the 1940 comedy Nap Hand. She was a semi-regular on the 1979 Anglo-Polish TV series Sherlock Holmes and Dr. Watson, and remained active in films until her retirement in 1981. Her last role was in Night Crossing (1982).

== Second marriage, later life and death ==
Walsh's second marriage was to the Canadian psychoanalyst Elliott Jaques, and they adopted daughter Gemma in 1956. This marriage also ended in divorce.

Walsh lived in retirement in London. She died on 16 April 2005 at the Chelsea and Westminster Hospital, aged 93, from multiple burns, following an accident.

== Filmography ==
Year	Title	Role	Notes	Ref.
1934	The Bedroom Diplomat	Minor Role	uncredited	
1934	Get Your Man	Mary Vivien		
1935	Smith's Wives	Mabel Smith		
1936	If I Were Rich	Chrissie de la Mothe		
1936	The Luck of the Irish	Eileen O'Donnel		
1936	The Secret of Stamboul	Diana		
1937	All That Glitters	Eve Payne-Coade		
1937	Keep Fit	Joan Allen		
1937	The Last Adventurers	Margaret Arkell		
1938	I See Ice	Judy Gaye		
1938	Meet Mr. Penny	Peggy Allgood		
1939	The Mind of Mr. Reeder	Peggy Gillette		
1939	The Missing People	Peggy Gillette		
1939	Sons of the Sea	Alison Devar		
1940	All at Sea	Diana		
1940	The Chinese Bungalow	Sadie Merivale		
1940	The Second Mr. Bush	Angela Windel-Todd		
1940	The Middle Watch	Fay Eaton		
1942	In Which We Serve	Freda Lewis		
1944	This Happy Breed	Queenie Gibbons		
1947	The October Man	Molly Newman		
1948	Vice Versa	Florence Verlane		
1948	Oliver Twist	Nancy		
1950	Stage Fright	Nellie Goode		
1950	Last Holiday	Mrs Poole		
1950	The Magnet	Mrs Brent		
1951	The Magic Box	Hotel Receptionist		
1951	Encore	Miss Molly Reid	segment: "Winter Cruise"	
1952	Hunted	Mrs. Sykes		
1952	Meet Me Tonight	Lily Pepper	segment: "Red Peppers"	
1953	Young Bess	Mrs Ashley		
1953	Gilbert Harding Speaking of Murder	Priscilla		
1954	Calling Scotland Yard: The Missing Passenger	Priscilla	short	
1954	The Rainbow Jacket	Barbara		
1954	Lease of Life	Vera Thorne		
1955	Cast a Dark Shadow	Charlotte Young		
1956	Now and Forever	Miss Muir		
1958	The Horse's Mouth	Dee Coker		
1960	Tunes of Glory	Mary Titterington		
1961	Greyfriars Bobby: The True Story of a Dog	Mrs Brown		
1961	Alfred Hitchcock Presents	Mrs. Morgan	Season 7 Episode 9: "I Spy"	
1962	Reach for Glory	Mrs Curlew		
1962	The L-Shaped Room	Prostitute	uncredited	
1963	80,000 Suspects	Matron		
1963	Dr. Syn, Alias the Scarecrow	Mrs Waggett		
1963	Lunch Hour	Manageress		
1964	Circus World	Flo Hunt	1964 TV series Gideon's Way as Martha Smallwood	
1964	The Beauty Jungle	Mrs. Freeman		
1965	A Study in Terror	Cathy Eddowes		
1965	He Who Rides a Tiger	Mrs Woodley		
1965	Gideon's Way : Episodes “The Housekeeper” and "Morna'	Martha and Mrs Harriet Bright		
1966	The Witches	Stephanie Bax		
1967	Bikini Paradise	Harriet Pembroke		
1969	Journey to the Unknown	Mrs Joan Walker	TV movie, episode: "The Last Visitor"	
1969	Taste of Excitement	Miss Barrow		
1970	Connecting Rooms	Mrs Brent		
1970	The Virgin and the Gypsy	Aunt Cissie		
1970	Scrooge	Mrs Fezziwig		
1972	The Ruling Class	Mrs Piggot-Jones		
1982	Night Crossing	Doris's mother		
