= Salvage with a Smile =

1940 film directed by Adrian Brunel

- Directed by: Adrian Brunel
- Screenplay by: Adrian Brunel
- Produced by: Ministry of Supply
- Starring: Aubrey Mallalieu; Ronald Shiner; Kathleen Harrison
- Cinematography: Leslie Rowson
- Edited by: Ernest Aldridge
- Production company: Ealing Studios
- Release date: 1940
- Running time: 6 minutes
- Country: United Kingdom
- Language: English

Salvage with a Smile is a 1940 British short black-and-white public information film directed and written by Adrian Brunel and starring Aubrey Mallalieu, Kathleen Harrison, Ronald Shiner and Phyllis Morris. It was produced by Ealing Studios and the Ministry of Supply for the Ministry of Information.

== Synopsis ==
The educational film aims to help the "people back home" save paper, bones and metal, for the war effort.

== Cast ==
- Aubrey Mallalieu as the professor
- Kathleen Harrison as the housekeeper
- Ronald Shiner as the dustman
- Phyllis Morris as Miss Green

== Reception ==
Kine Weekly wrote: "For those wishful to help but uncertain of the method, the M.O.I. offers simple suggestions and illustrate the many uses to which the nation's salvage is put."
