= Marjorie Gaffney =

British actress and screenwriter (1897–1963)

- Born: 1897; Liverpool, Lancashire; United Kingdom
- Died: 26 July 1963 (aged 65–66); Brighton, East Sussex; United Kingdom
- Other name: Margery Elizabeth Ross Gaffney
- Occupations: Actress, Writer, Director
- Years active: 1920 – 1940 (film)

Marjorie Gaffney (1897–1963) was a British actress and screenwriter. She also worked as an assistant director on a number of films.

== Selected filmography ==
=== Actress ===
- Garryowen (1920)
- Victory (1928)

=== Assistant director ===
- Atlantic (1929)
- The W Plan (1930)

=== Screenwriter ===
- Night of the Garter (1933)
- Lady in Danger (1934)
- Evergreen (1934)
- My Old Dutch (1934)
- First a Girl (1935)
- Me and Marlborough (1935)
- Sunset in Vienna (1937)
- The Rat (1938)
- The Mind of Mr. Reeder (1939)

== Bibliography ==
- Harper, Sue. Women in British Cinema: Mad, Bad and Dangerous to Know. A&C Black, 2000.
