= The Time of His Life =

- DVD cover
- Directed by: Leslie S. Hiscott
- Written by: Leslie S. Hiscott; Richard Hearne
- Story by: Leslie S. Hiscott & Brock Williams
- Produced by: Elizabeth Hiscott; W. A. Smith
- Starring: Richard Hearne; Ellen Pollock; Richard Wattis; Frederick Leister
- Cinematography: Kenneth Talbot
- Edited by: Erwin Reiner
- Music by: Elizabeth Hiscott
- Production company: Shaftesbury Films
- Distributed by: Renown Pictures Corporation
- Release date: 1955
- Running time: 74 minutes
- Country: United Kingdom
- Language: English

The Time of His Life is a 1955 British comedy film directed by Leslie S. Hiscott and starring Richard Hearne, Ellen Pollock, Richard Wattis and Robert Moreton. The screenplay was by Hiscott and Hearne from a story by Hiscott and Brock Williams, concerning a man who is released from prison and goes to live with his socialite daughter.

== Plot ==
When newly released prisoner Mr. Pastry arrives to stay, he proves an embarrassment to his social climbing daughter Lady Florence. As president of the society for the rehabilitation of ex-convicts, she attempts to hide the fact her father is an ex-con. She locks Mr. Pastry in his bedroom, and even plots to have him sent to Australia. But Lady Florence's children see Mr. Pastry differently, and he helps them through a problem, prompting even his daughter to see Mr. Pastry in a new light.

== Cast ==
- Richard Hearne as Charles Pastry
- Ellen Pollock as Lady Florence
- Richard Wattis as Edgar
- Robert Moreton as Humphrey
- Frederick Leister as Sir John
- Peter Sinclair as Kane
- John Downing as Simon
- Anne Smith as Penelope
- Darcy Conyers as Morgan
- Yvonne Hearne as Guest
- Peggy Ann Clifford as Cook
- Arthur Hewlett as Prison Governor
- Harry Towb as Steele

== Critical reception ==
The Monthly Film Bulletin wrote: "A mildly amusing vehicle for Mr. Pastry (Richard Hearne) supported by many of the stock characters – comic butlers, horsey titled ladies, Foreign Office types, half-witted sons – familiar in British 'B' comedies. Among this collection, Mr, Pastry emerges as the most likeable, though his characterisation scarcely manages to sustain the film. More of his comic sketches might profitably have been included; here only a drastically cut version of his struggles with a sousaphone remains to give a glimpse of his real talent."

TV Guide gave the film two out of five stars, calling it a "simple comedy with likable characters."

The Radio Times Guide to Films gave the film 3/5 stars, writing: "While not a patch on Pastry's many TV shows, it's still a nostalgic treat."

Sky Movies also rated the film three out of five stars, writing, "Both comedy and pathos come off well in an unpretentious little film that has likeable characters, an acceptable story and some amusing situations. In the supporting cast: two other music-hall comedians – Robert Moreton, once famous for his 'Bumper Fun Book' and Peter Sinclair."

In British Sound Films: The Studio Years 1928–1959 David Quinlan rated the film as "average", writing: "Unusual comedy with touches of pathos; quite acceptable."
