= The Man Within =

1929 novel by Graham Greene

- First edition
- Author: Graham Greene
- Language: English
- Genre: Historical novel
- Publisher: William Heinemann
- Publication date: 1929
- Publication place: United Kingdom
- Media type: Hardcover (first edition)
- Text: The Man Within online

The Man Within (1929) is the first novel by author Graham Greene. It tells the story of Francis Andrews, a reluctant smuggler who betrays his colleagues, and the aftermath of his betrayal. It is Greene's first published novel. (Two earlier attempts at writing novels were never published, but a book of poetry, Babbling April, was published in 1925, while Greene was a student at Balliol College, Oxford).

The title is taken from a sentence in Thomas Browne's Religio Medici: 'There's another man within me that's angry with me.'

Greene, in his preface to the Penguin paperback edition of the book, derides the book as hopelessly romantic.

== Characters ==
The central characters are Francis Andrews; Elizabeth, a girl he meets shortly after the man she lives with dies; and Carlyon, the captain of the smuggling boat whom Andrews has betrayed by writing a letter informing the customs officers of the time that the boat will land.

== Themes ==
The key themes in the novel are betrayal and a Freudian relationship between the protagonist Andrews and his deceased father.

== Plot summary ==
The story begins with Andrews fleeing his fellow smugglers after a battle with the customs officials that ended with one of the customs officials dead. He stumbles upon an isolated cottage which is the home of Elizabeth. The man whom she lived with has recently died. Andrews helps protect Elizabeth from the neighbors who consider her to be a woman of loose moral character (the novel is silent about whether their view is justified or not). After encountering Carlyon, the head of the smugglers, in the fog, Andrews returns to the cottage where Elizabeth persuades him that he should testify at the trial of the smugglers at the Assizes in Lewes.

Andrews travels to Lewes and gives his testimony in court despite being scorned by the other witnesses for the prosecution as a Judas figure. The trial ends with the smugglers being acquitted and their pledging to revenge themselves on Andrews by hurting Elizabeth.

Andrews returns to Elizabeth's cottage, tells her of the danger. She sends him to the well to fetch water, and while he is gone, he discovers that one of the smugglers has come to the cottage. He runs to get help, but when he returns, he discovers that Elizabeth has killed herself while being attacked by one of the smugglers. Carlyon is sitting waiting for him. After realizing that the only way to betray his father is to hurt himself, Andrews tells Carlyon to leave and that he will take the blame for Elizabeth's death.

== Film, TV or theatrical adaptations ==
In 1947, a film version, The Man Within, was made of the novel (called The Smugglers in the United States) starring Ronald Shiner, Michael Redgrave as Carlyon and Richard Attenborough as Andrews.
