= Walter Wesché =

British composer, pianist and entomologist (1857 - 1910)

Walter Francis Frederick Wesché (1857 – 26 September 1910) was a British composer, pianist, and entomologist. Born in Colombo, Ceylon, Wesché came to England at a young age and studied the piano under Mr. Oscar Beringer, as well as composition under Berthold Tours and F. H. Cowen. He later taught harmony at the Oscar Beringer School for the Higher Development of Pianoforte-playing, and the piano at the Royal Normal College for the Blind. His compositions won recognition in the form of prizes from the Westminster Orchestral Society and the Musicians' Company. As an entomologist he was known as an authority on flies (Diptera). He was elected a Fellow of the Royal Microscopical Society in 1901.
