= Robert Moreton =

English comedian and actor (1922–1957)

- Signed photo
- Born: Henry Moreton; 25 June 1922; Teddington, Middlesex, England
- Died: 22 July 1957 (aged 35); Chelsea, London, England
- Occupations: Comedian, actor
- Years active: 1940s–1957

Robert Moreton (born Henry Moreton; 25 June 1922 – 22 July 1957) was an English comedian and actor.

== Biography ==
Born in Teddington, Middlesex, he initially had a successful straight acting career with the Old Vic Theatre, before becoming a scriptwriter for comedians Tommy Handley and Lupino Lane. He served in the Royal Air Force, where he performed in Gang Shows with Tony Hancock among others.

He developed a distinctive character as an amateurish and dithering aspiring comedian. His act involved him looking through his imaginary "Bumper Fun Book" for a joke, trying to tell it but hesitating and getting confused, for instance through turning over the wrong page, before eventually coming up with the punchline -- which would frequently make no sense, until Moreton went back and read the set-up. This 'reverse' style of joke telling would get a laugh on the reveal of the unexpected set-up, and became Moreton's signature. On receiving applause, he would cry out "Get in there, Moreton!", which became a well-known catchphrase.

After the end of the war, he appeared on radio shows such as Variety Bandbox and Workers' Playtime. In 1950, he appeared in the first series of the popular radio comedy series Educating Archie, as Archie's tutor. He was replaced in later series by Tony Hancock. Moreton also had his own radio series starting in 1951, Bumblethorpe, scripted by Spike Milligan, in which he would repeatedly search for the eponymous character.

He failed to maintain the momentum of his career in subsequent years, Roy Hudd suggesting that "the public tired of [his] one-joke approach". However, he appeared in several comedy films, including One Wild Oat (1951), The Time of His Life (1955) and Tons of Trouble (1956). He also appeared in the pilot series of the radio show The Clitheroe Kid in 1956.

Moreton killed himself in 1957, aged 35, after suffering depression from his lack of work.
