= Sabotage at Sea =

1942 film

- Richard Hearne
- Directed by: Leslie S. Hiscott
- Written by: Michael Barringer
- Produced by: Elizabeth Hiscott
- Starring: Jane Carr; Margaretta Scott; David Hutcheson
- Cinematography: Günther Krampf
- Edited by: Peter Tanner
- Music by: W.L. Trytel
- Production companies: British National Films; Shaftesbury Films
- Distributed by: Anglo-American Film Corporation (UK)
- Release date: 7 September 1942 (UK)
- Running time: 61 minutes
- Country: United Kingdom
- Language: English

Sabotage at Sea is a 1942 British black-and-white war film directed by Leslie S. Hiscott and starring Jane Carr, Margaretta Scott, David Hutcheson and Ronald Shiner. It was written by Michael Barringer and produced by British National Films and Shaftesbury Films.

== Synopsis ==
A series of vignettes introduce us to a selection of people who later turn out to be the individual suspects.

Cargo ship Captain Tracey has discovered that enemy agents have tampered with his ship. The film follows the search for the saboteur. Six would-be subjects are jointly kidnapped/shanghaied and kept on board while Tracey investigates which one is the saboteur. The investigation tales place en route to New York.

== Cast ==
- Jane Carr as Diane
- Margaretta Scott as Jane Dighton
- David Hutcheson as Captain Tracey
- Martita Hunt as Daphne Faber
- Felix Aylmer as John Dighton
- Ralph Truman as Chandler
- Ian Fleming as 1st Officer
- Arthur Maude as Engineer Officer
- William Hartnell as Digby
- Wally Patch as Steward
- Ronald Shiner as Cook
- Hay Petrie as talkative sailor at table

== Production ==
The film was known as Rendezvous at Sea and Rendezvous for Convoy.

== Critical reception ==
The Monthly Film Bulletin wrote: "Dialogue rather than action predominates in this film, and as a result it lacks the excitement and suspense expected in a war-time sabotage story. The comedy element is well to the fore, however, in the persons of Wally Patch and Ronald Shiner, who give excellent performances as the steward and cook of the ship. There is also competent acting from the rest of the cast."

Kine Weekly wrote: "The story, which is written in a familiar 'who dunnit' vein, opens with promise, but dialogue quickly gets the upper hand. Many legitimate laughs but few thrills reward its strenuous labours. The action is anticipatory rather than actual. ... The yarn has a breezy opening and some good comedy intermissions, but there is not enough robust action to hold the interest while the sabotage angle is being established."

Picturegoer wrote: "Unfortunately the dialogue is more pronounced than action. There is some good comedy, but the script does not give the artistes many opportunities. Comedy is well supplied by Wally Patch and Ronald Shiner."

Picture Show wrote: "Although it is rather overloaded with dialogue, it is quite entertaining and the drama and suspense are well lightened with comedy provided chiefly by the steward and cook. Dave Hutcheson gives an agreeable performance as the captain, and the rest of the cast is good."

TV Guide wrote, "The cast is handicapped by an uneventful, wordy script."
