= Death on the Table =

1938 play

- Written by: Michael Pertwee; Guy Beauchamp
- Original language: English
- Genre: Thriller

Premiere
- Date premiered: 27 January 1938
- Place premiered: Richmond Theatre, London

Death on the Table is a 1938 thriller play by the writers Michael Pertwee and Guy Beauchamp. The plot revolves around American gangsters, Harley Street doctors and a murder that takes place on the operating table.

It premiered at Richmond Theatre before transferring to the West End where it ran for 93 performances between 9 March and 7 May 1938, initially at the Strand Theatre then moving to the New Theatre. The original London cast included Kay Walsh, Peter Coke, Walter Fitzgerald, Hartley Power, Hugh McDermott, Bill Shine and Ellis Irving. Produced by Basil Dean, the sets were designed by the art director Edward Carrick. It was staged on Broadway at the Playhouse Theatre under the alternative title Come Across, but lasted only 13 performances.

== Bibliography ==
- Bordman, Gerald . American Theatre: A Chronicle of Comedy and Drama, 1930-1969. Oxford University Press, 1996.
- Wearing, J.P. The London Stage 1930-1939: A Calendar of Productions, Performers, and Personnel. Rowman & Littlefield, 2014.
