= Peggy Cochrane =

English musician, singer and composer (1902–1988)

- Born: Margaret Tennant Cochrane; 12 January 1902; Streatham, London, England
- Died: 9 August 1988 (aged 86); Bognor Regis, West Sussex,. England
- Occupations: Musician, singer, composer
- Years active: 1920s–1950s

Margaret Tennant Cochrane (12 January 1902 – 9 August 1988) was an English musician, singer and composer. She played both violin and piano, and broadcast and performed successfully from the 1920s to the 1950s.

== Life and career ==
Peggy Cochrane was born in Streatham, London, the daughter of a civil servant, and was a musical child prodigy. She won a scholarship to the Royal Academy of Music aged eight; won open competitions on both violin and piano on the same day, aged 14; and was awarded the prize as the most distinguished scholar at the college. She made her first broadcasts on BBC radio in 1924, in violin recitals. That year, she also married her first husband, Dr Disney Hubert Dusch Cran M.D., a consultant physician from Edinburgh who specialised in paediatrics and was mentioned in dispatches for his service in the Great War.

In the later 1920s and early 1930s, she featured regularly on BBC radio, and in cabaret with William Walker and Patrick Waddington, as That Certain Trio (and with Waddington as That Certain Pair after Walker left the act). In 1933, she gave her first performances on television, and the following year started a regular radio slot, "A Tune A Minute", in which she would play 15 tunes in 15 minutes. She composed and performed short pieces for children, and was able to move from playing a classical violin concerto in concert during the day, to performing on piano in hotel cabarets in the evening, occasionally with cellist Gwen Farrar. She also sang to her own piano accompaniment, and with Jack Jackson's Orchestra, and appeared in the films Radio Parade of 1935 (1934) and Rhythm in the Air (1936).

In 1937, she began working regularly with bandleader Jack Payne, appearing together at the 1938 Royal Variety Performance. Though both were married, they established a close personal as well as professional relationship. She separated from her husband in spring 1938; on 21 October 1938, he took his own life at their home in West London, aged 50.

Payne and his wife divorced, and Payne and Cochrane married in 1940. They recorded together, toured troops in France as part of ENSA, and continued to broadcast regularly, with Cochrane sometimes performing her own piano compositions.

Once asked why she gave up classical music and moved into other areas, she said: "More money was to be had (and less hard work) playing and singing popular music". Cochrane continued to perform, broadcast and record through the 1950s, releasing the EP Cocktails with Cochrane in 1958 and writing music for films and television. In 1959, she appeared as the guest on Desert Island Discs. After Payne's death, Cochrane published an autobiography, We Said it with Music - the Story of Peggy Cochrane and Jack Payne, in 1979.

Cochrane died in Bognor Regis in 1988, aged 86.
