= Aimée Daniell Beringer =

American dramatist (1856–1936)

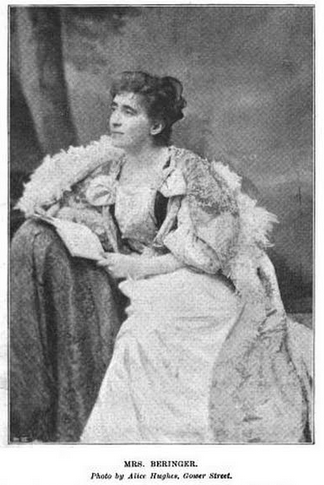
Aimée Daniell Beringer, from an 1896 publication.

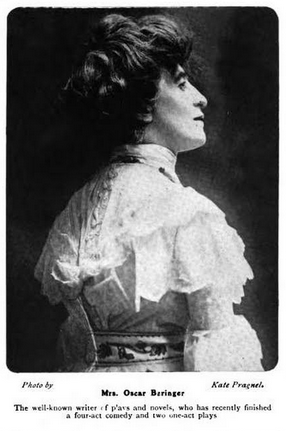
Aimee Daniell Beringer, from a 1905 publication.

Aimée Daniell Beringer (1856 – February 17, 1936) billed professionally as Mrs. Oscar Beringer, was an American-born playwright, theatrical manager, novelist, and commentator, based in London.

== Early life ==
Aimée Daniell was born in Philadelphia, Pennsylvania, the daughter of Edward Lynch Daniell. Her parents were English, and she moved to Mexico as a child, and England to live at age 15.

== Career ==
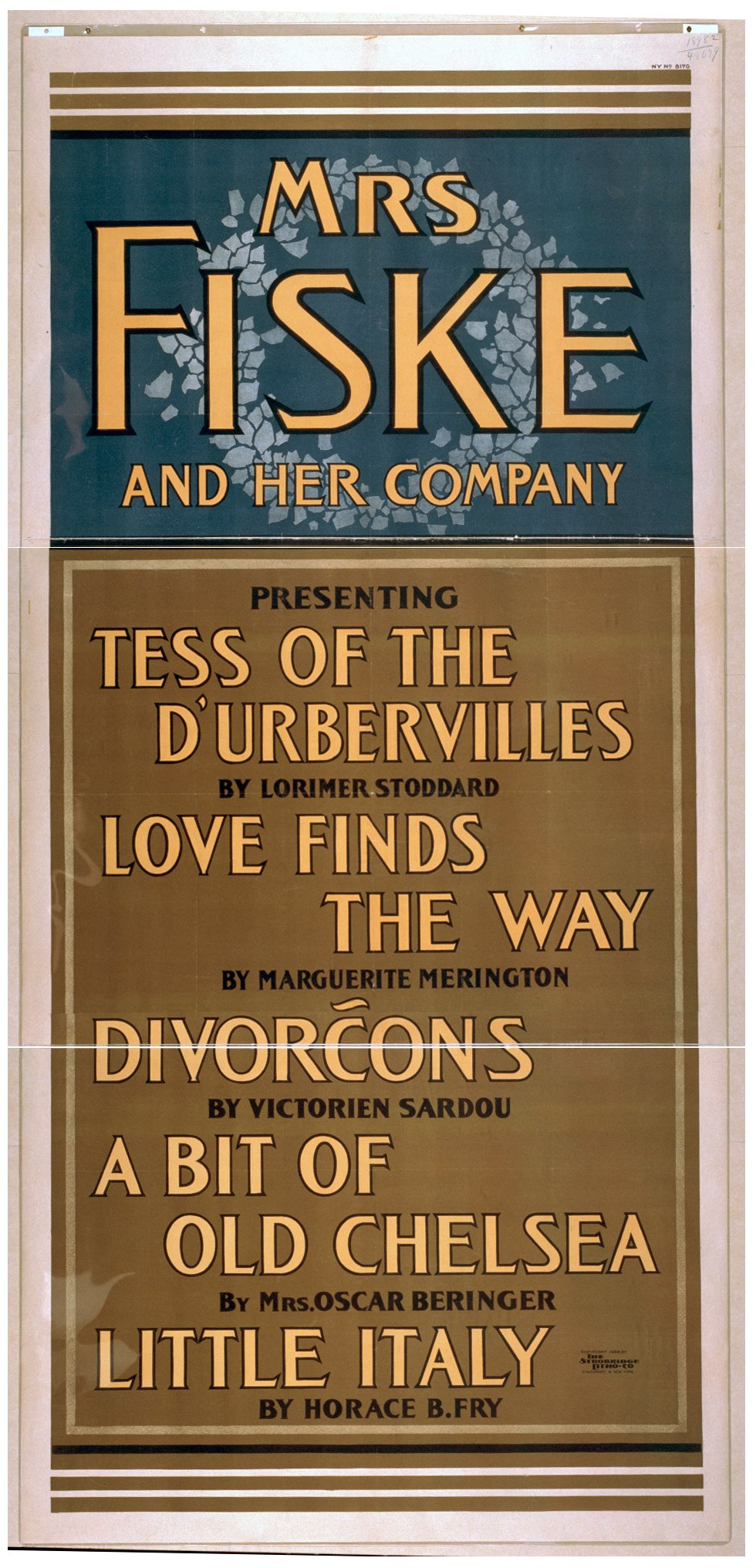
An 1898 poster for Mrs. Fiske and her company, presenting Tess of the D'Urbervilles by Lorimer Stoddard, Love finds the way by Marguerite Merington, Divorćons by Victorien Sardou, A Bit of Old Chelsea by Mrs. Oscar Baringer, Little Italy by Horace B. Fry; LCCN 2014637440

In 1896, To-day magazine described Aimée Daniell Beringer as "one of the most popular personalities in literary and theatrical Bohemia." Beringer was the manager of the Opera Comique Theatre in London. Plays by Beringer included Tares: A Social Problem (1888), Katherine Kavenagh, The Prince and the Pauper (1890, adapted from the Mark Twain book), That Girl (1890, adapted from a story by Clementina Black), Holly Tree Inn (1891, 1902; an adaptation of a Charles Dickens story), Bess (1891, 1893), Salve (1895), A Bit of Old Chelsea (1897, 1898, 1902), My Lady's Orchard (1897), The Plot of His Story (1899–1901), Jim Belmont (1901), and The Agitator (1907–1908). She also wrote novels, including Beloved of the Gods (After the Danish) (1883), A Left-Handed Marriage (1886) and The New Virtue (1896).

She was one of the commenters in The Idler's "The Idlers' Club," along with Eliza Lynn Linton, Evelyn Sharp, Arabella Kenealy, Fred Whishaw, Ella Hepworth Dixon, Jerome K. Jerome, Robert Blatchford, George Bernard Shaw, and other literary figures. The monthly panel discussed such topics such as early marriage ("Youth is a very charming and enviable possession, but none will deny that it is imperious, exacting, and egotistic," she opined) and "At What Age is Man Most Attractive to Woman?" (Beringer began her response to this subject with "This is a very distracting question.")

== Personal life ==
Aimée Daniell married the pianist Oscar Beringer in 1873. Among their five children were actresses Esme Beringer and Vera Beringer, who both appeared in productions of their mother's plays. Her son Guy Beringer was a journalist. She was widowed in 1922, and died in 1936, aged 79 years, at a nursing home in Bournemouth.
