= The Prime Minister (film) =

- Directed by: Thorold Dickinson
- Written by: Michael Hogan; Brock Williams
- Produced by: Max Milder
- Starring: John Gielgud; Diana Wynyard; Fay Compton; Stephen Murray
- Cinematography: Basil Emmott
- Edited by: Leslie Norman
- Music by: Jack Beaver
- Production company: Warner Bros.-First National Productions
- Distributed by: Warner Bros. Pictures
- Release date: 4 March 1941
- Running time: 94 minutes
- Country: United Kingdom
- Language: English
- Budget: £90,215
- Box office: £64,661

The Prime Minister is a 1941 British historical drama film directed by Thorold Dickinson and starring John Gielgud, Diana Wynyard, Fay Compton and Stephen Murray.

It details the life and times of Benjamin Disraeli, who became Prime Minister of the United Kingdom. It depicts his long marriage to Mary Disraeli and his relationship with various other public figures of the era including William Gladstone, Lord Melbourne and Queen Victoria. Gielgud would later reprise his role as Disraeli in the ITV television drama Edward the Seventh (1975).

The film was shot at Teddington Studios by the British subsidiary of Warner Bros. Pictures. The company had previously made a successful biopic of the Prime Minister as Disraeli in 1929. The film's sets were designed by the art director Norman G. Arnold.

== Plot ==
The film is not a remake of the 1929 film Disraeli, which depicted only one incident late in Disraeli's career. Instead, The Prime Minister is an episodic biography of Disraeli from his early career as a novelist through his political triumphs as an elder statesman. The film is almost a hagiography, depicting Disraeli as a lifelong social reformer and a Tory democrat dedicated to "England" and to "democracy"; the film ends with a scene that the American Film Institute describes as a crowd cheering Disraeli and Queen Victoria "for saving the country".

Turner Classic Movies describes the film this way—

The Prime Minister (1941) is the legendary Benjamin Disraeli, played by the legendary John Gielgud in a tour-de-force performance that takes Disraeli from a foppish young novelist, to a neophyte member of Parliament, to prime minister of England and confidante of Queen Victoria. Along the way, "Dizzy" woos and weds his wife Mary Anne, who provides shrewd support for his career. He also battles political opponents, helps the poor and working class, buys the Suez Canal, expands the empire, and foils the imperialist plans of the German-Austrian-Russian political alliance.

== Cast ==
- John Gielgud as Benjamin Disraeli
- Diana Wynyard as Mary Disraeli
- Fay Compton as Queen Victoria
- Pamela Standish as Victoria, Princess Royal
- Stephen Murray as William Ewart Gladstone
- Owen Nares as Lord Derby
- Frederick Leister as Lord Melbourne
- Nicholas Hannen as Sir Robert Peel
- Will Fyffe as The Agitator
- Anthony Ireland as the Count D'Orsay
- Irene Browne as Lady Londonderry
- Joss Ambler as Earl of Carnarvon
- Vera Bogetti as Lady Blessington
- Barbara Everest as Baroness Lehzen
- Lyn Harding as Bismarck
- Glynis Johns as Miss Sheridan
- Margaret Johnston as Miss Sheridan
- Andrea Troubridge as Miss Sheridan
- Nadine March as Mary Anne's maid
- Gordon McLeod as John Brown
- Leslie Perrins as Marquess of Salisbury
- Kynaston Reeves as Lord Stanley
- Abraham Sofaer as Turkish ambassador

== Notes ==
The Prime Minister opened in the United States in February 1942, eleven months after its British premiere. The American version was cut by 15 minutes— among the scenes removed was one featuring Glynis Johns, then beginning her career.

== Box office ==
According to Warner Bros records the film earned the studio $16,000 domestically and $21,000 foreign.
