= Richard Hearne =

English comic actor (1908–1979)

Richard Hearne OBE
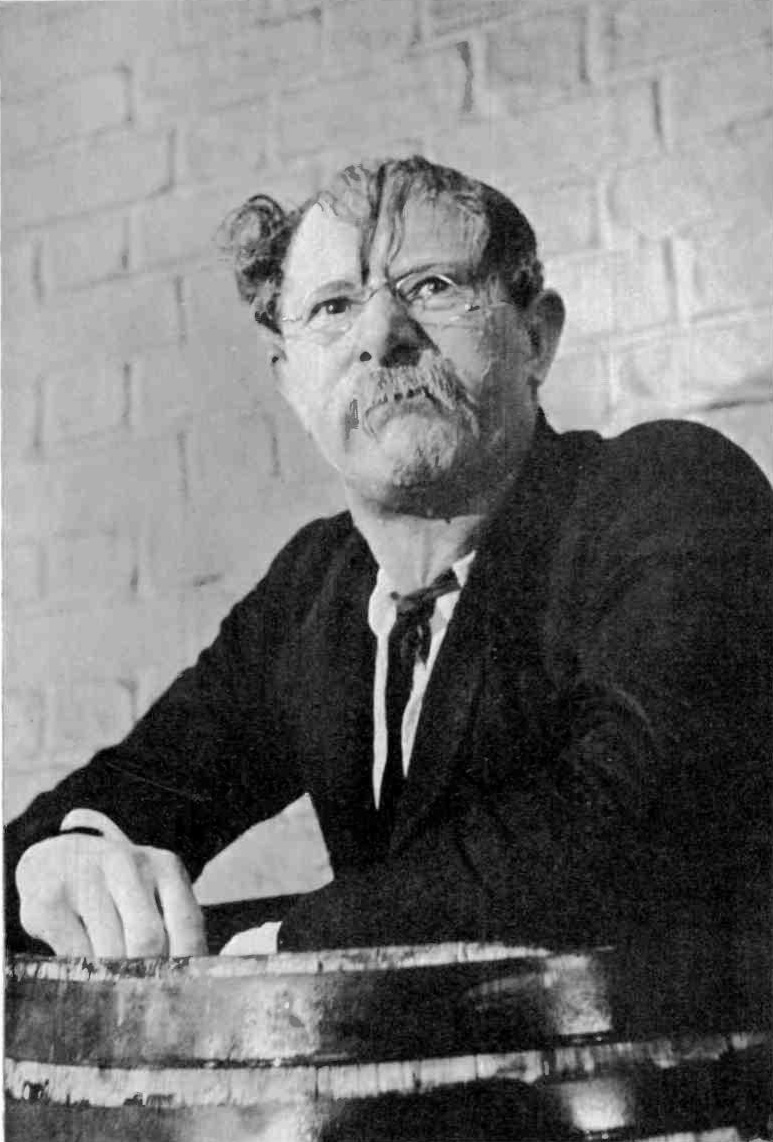
- Richard Hearne, circa 1952
- Born: Richard Lewis Hearne; 30 January 1908; Norwich, Norfolk, England
- Died: 23 August 1979 (aged 71); Bearsted, Kent, England
- Resting place: St Mary's Platt, Kent, England
- Occupation: Comic actor

Richard Lewis Hearne OBE (30 January 1908 – 23 August 1979) was an English actor, comedian, producer and writer. He is best remembered for his stage and television character Mr. Pastry.

== Career ==
Hearne was born in Norwich, Norfolk, in 1908, the son of Richard and Lily May Hearne. Richard Sr. came from a theatrical family—his mother had been on the stage, and he himself was a performing acrobat. Hearne worked on and off for the BBC for thirty years; he became the first performer to be known as a "television star" and also the first to have his own television series. The series, with the theme tune "Pop Goes the Weasel", had episodes lasting 25 minutes in which Hearne assumed the character of "Mr Pastry" – an old man with a walrus moustache, dressed in a black suit or raincoat and with a trademark bowler hat. Each week, the bumbling old man would have adventures, partly slapstick, partly comic dance, with two young friends. Jon Pertwee also starred in the show in a variety of roles.

The Mr Pastry character had originated in the 1936 stage show Big Boy, in which Hearne had appeared with Fred Emney. A Mr. Pastry film, The Time of His Life, was subsequently released in 1955 but portrayed the lead character as a pathetic figure coming out of prison and totally different from the TV series' bumbling comic.

His act first appeared on the US Ed Sullivan Show in 1954, and thereafter Hearne appeared on the show frequently. Buster Keaton was reportedly a fan. Hearne was the subject of This Is Your Life in 1959 when he was surprised by Eamonn Andrews at the BBC Television Theatre. In 1963, Hearne became President of the Lord's Taverners charity and he subsequently raised money for hundreds of hydrotherapy pools. In 1970, he was awarded an OBE for his charitable work.

He was interviewed for the role of the Fourth Doctor in the BBC series Doctor Who after the 1974 departure of Jon Pertwee, but a misunderstanding over the required interpretation of the role (he anticipated playing the Doctor as Mr. Pastry) led to no offer being made by the producer, Barry Letts. The role was subsequently offered to Tom Baker. In 1976, he appeared as Mr. Pastry on the BBC's old-time music hall show, The Good Old Days.

Hearne died in Bearsted, Kent, in 1979, aged 71, leaving a widow, Yvonne (née Ortner), and two children. He was buried in the churchyard in the village of St. Mary's Platt, near Borough Green in Kent. He had lived at Platt Farm, a fifteenth-century property in Long Mill Lane in the village, from the 1940s, and ran a market garden there.

== Filmography ==
| Year | Title | Role | Notes |
|---|---|---|---|
| 1934 | Give Her a Ring | Drunk | |
| 1935 | Dance Band | Acrobatic Drunk | |
| 1935 | No Monkey Business | Charlie | |
| 1937 | Splinters in the Air | Sgt. Hearne | |
| 1937 | Millions | Jimmy Forbes | |
| 1943 | Miss London Ltd. | Commodore Joshua Wellington | |
| 1943 | The Butler's Dilemma | Rodney Playfair | |
| 1948 | One Night with You | Station Master | Uncredited |
| 1948 | Woman Hater | Reveller | Uncredited |
| 1949 | Passport to Pimlico | Night-time Drunk on Bike | Uncredited |
| 1949 | Helter Skelter | Professor Pastry | |
| 1950 | Something in the City | William Ningle | |
| 1951 | Captain Horatio Hornblower | Polwheal (Hornblower's Steward) | |
| 1951 | Madame Louise | Mr. Charles Pastry | also titled The Madame Gambles |
| 1952 | Miss Robin Hood | Henry Wrigley | |
| 1955 | The Time of His Life | Mr. Charles Pastry | |
| 1956 | Tons of Trouble | Mr. Charles Pastry | |
