= Vera Beringer =

British actress

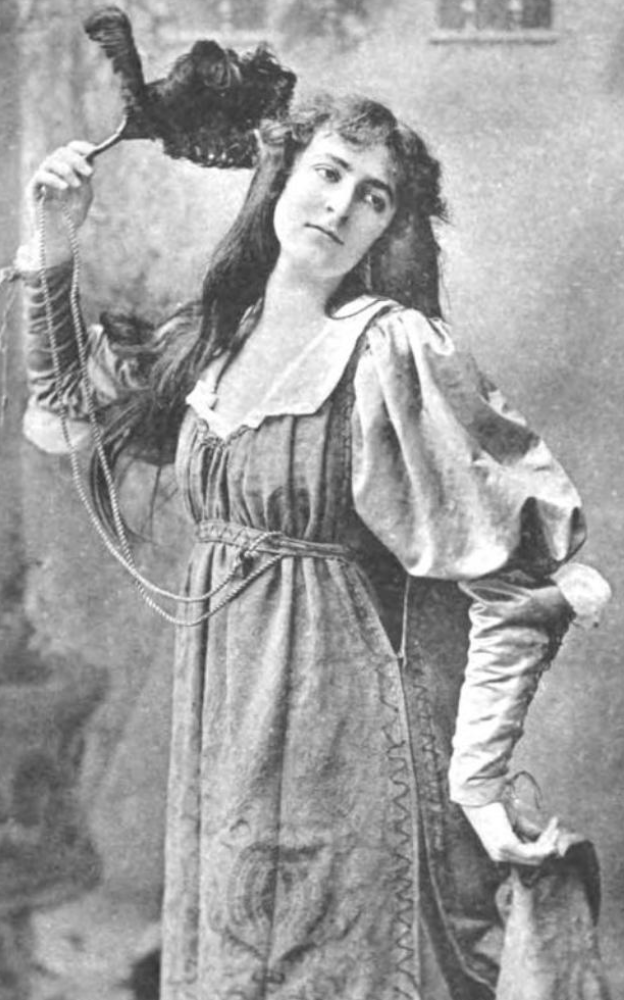
- Vera Beringer, from an 1896 publication
- Born: 2 March 1878; London
- Died: 29 January 1964 (aged 85); Brighton
- Other name: Henry Seton
- Occupations: Actress, playwright
- Parent(s): Oscar Beringer and Aimée Daniell Beringer
- Relatives: Esme Beringer (sister)

Vera Beringer (2 March 1878 – 29 January 1964) was a British actress and writer. As a child she became well known for playing Little Lord Fauntleroy on the London stage. Later she was a playwright, sometimes using the byline Henry Seton.

== Early life ==
Vera Beringer was born in London in 1878, (Note: Though some sources that give 1879 as the year, Vera Beringer's birth was registered in London in 1878; ''Civil Registration Birth Index'', via Ancestry.com) the younger daughter of German-born pianist Oscar Beringer and American-born novelist and playwright Aimée Daniell Beringer. Her sister was actress Esme Beringer. Her brother Guy Beringer was a journalist, credited with coining the word "brunch" in 1895. She attended Praetoria House school in Folkestone, together with Ford Madox Ford and Elsie Martindale, who was to become Ford's wife.

== Career ==
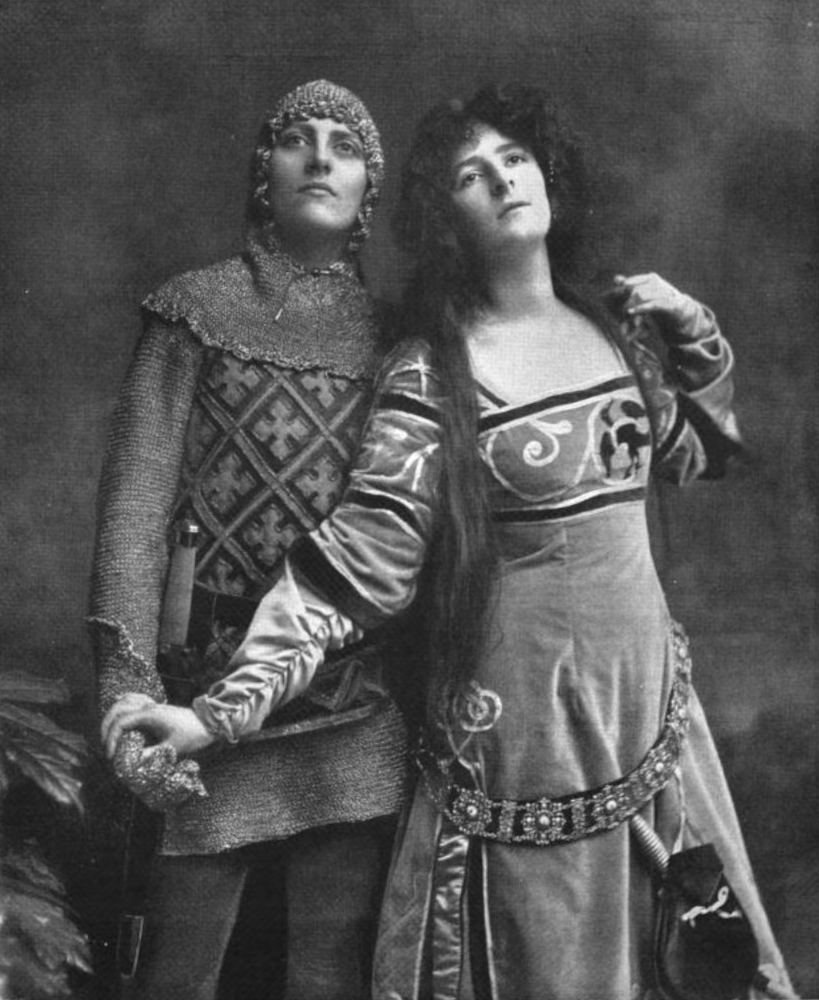
Esme (left) and Vera Beringer (right) in My Lady's Orchard (1897)

Beringer became internationally famous in childhood for originating the role of Little Lord Fauntleroy on the London stage in 1888. She was coached in stagecraft by Madge Kendal. As a teen, she played Juliet to her sister's Romeo in a production of Romeo and Juliet. Other stage appearances included roles in The Pillars of Society (1889), The Prince and the Pauper (1890), That Girl (1890), On a Doorstep (1890), Holly Tree Inn (1891), Richelieu (1896), Our Boys (1896), The Pilgrim's Progress (1896), My Lady's Orchard (1897), A Warm Member (1898), Shadows on the Blind (1898), Alone in London (1900), The Broken Melody (1902), Warp and Woof (1904), Fanny and the Servant Problem (1908), The Whip (1910), The Odd Woman (1912), The Vision of Delight (1912), The Absent-Minded Husband (1913), The Morning Post (1913), and The Man from Blankley's (1930). During World War I, she and her sister entertained American and British troops in London. She played Gertrude to her sister's Hamlet in 1938, and the sisters gave further Shakespeare performances during World War II.

Beringer wrote at least nineteen plays, often under the pen name "Henry Seton", including The Boys (1908), False Dawn (1910, with Morley Roberts), Pierrot's Little Joke (1912), Three Common People (1912), A Penny Bunch (1912–1913), The Blue-Stocking (1913, with Mesley Down; an adaptation of Molière's Les Femmes Savantes), Set a Thief (1915), Lucky Jim (1915), Daring (1917), A Pair (1917), The Honourable Gertrude (1918), Biffy (1920, with William Ray), Beltane Night (1923), The Painted Lady (1924), Alice and Thomas and Jane (1932), House Full (1933), and It Might Happen to You (1937). Her play Another Man's Life was adapted for television in 1957.

Lewis Carroll wrote a limerick titled "To Miss Vera Beringer". In 1933 Vera Beringer and Madge Kendal appeared together as speakers in London, advocating for male teachers and headmasters at boys' schools.

== Personal life ==
Beringer lived in Hove in her later years, and died in 1964, aged 85 years, at a nursing home in Brighton. She left all her property to her sister, who survived her.
