= Because of the Dollars =

1914 short story by Joseph Conrad

- Short story by Joseph Conrad
- Country: United States
- Language: English

Publication
- Published in: Metropolitan Magazine
- Publication date: September 1914

"Because of the Dollars" is a short story by Joseph Conrad, first published as "Laughing Anne" in Metropolitan Magazine in September 1914. The story was collected in Within the Tides (1915) published by J. M. Dent and Sons.

== Plot ==
The story is set in Bangkok and the Malaysian Peninsula. The merchant steamer Sissie is operated by Captain Davidson under the auspices of his Chinese business partner and owner of the Sissie. In addition to making the vessel profitable, Davidson's honesty and genuinely humane character has gained the confidence of the owner.

When the British government issues new currency, the old dollars must be exchanged before they become devalued. Davidson sees an opportunity to transport his customer's old government cash to Bangkok and exchange them as a service. His wife, a fearful and suspicious woman, warns him not to engage in the risky enterprise.

One of Davidson's old acquaintances is the former prostitute Laughing Annie, who is raising her young son in a remote village. She arranges to have the Sissie carry some goods to market. Her lover is the ne'er do well and swindler, Bamtz. When apprized that Davidson is in possession of a substantial sum of old currency, Bamtz conspires with three other men to board the Sissie and steal the cash. Annie warns Davidson just in time, and he succeeds in driving off the robbers with a hail of gunfire. The ringleader of the criminals murders Annie in revenge for her betrayal.

The incident induces Davidson's wife to leave her husband, taking their daughter with her back to Europe. Annie's orphaned boy becomes Davidson's only companion. The boy departs with a group of Christian missionaries when he reaches manhood. The despairing Davidson finds himself alone in his old age, left "to go downhill without a single human affection near him because of the old dollars."

== Background ==
Conrad's plot and theme from his 1915 novel Victory was used to formulate "Because of the Dollars", written at the time the novel was completed. Conversely, "Because of the Dollars" tells the story "which Conrad had originally set out to tell in what became Victory."

Encouraged by the commercial success of the story, Conrad thought the piece worthy of adaptation to the stage. The two-act drama "emphasized the gothic elements in the criminal conspiracy." According to Graver, the play "has even less substance than the story."

== Critical assessment ==
During the last eight years of his life, Conrad wrote a number of critical essays, two plays, and four novels. Literary critic Laurence Graver reports that the novels" are generally admitted to be failures of a fatigued imagination: prolix, platitudinous and unconvincing..." Abandoning short fiction after 1916, "Because of the Dollars" is one of his last works in this literary form. Graver describes the story as "a proficient potboiler [and] an unassuming, neatly ordered tale adventure."

The story presents one of Conrad's favorite thematic devices: "the perils of simple-minded altruism." As such, the work is a less dramatic facsimile of his novel Victory. Graver writes:

The parallels with Victory are obvious: the isolated hero is set upon by theatrical band of robbers, and after a savage denouement, a befriended woman dies for him.

Biographer Jocelyn Baines offers this appraisal of "Because of the Dollars": "It is a good, authentic story, based on personal knowledge, which vividly captures the disreputable elements of life in the Eastern seas."

== Sources ==
- Baines, Jocelyn. 1960. Joseph Conrad: A Critical Biography. McGraw-Hill Book Company, New York. ISBN 978-0297167556
- Graver, Laurence. 1969. Conrad's Short Fiction. University of California Press, Berkeley, California. ISBN 0-520-00513-9
