= Michael Hogan (screenwriter) =

British actor and screenwriter (1893–1977)

- Born: 17 September 1893; London, United Kingdom
- Died: 1 January 1977 (aged 83); London, United Kingdom
- Other name: Michael John Hogan
- Occupations: Film actor, Screenwriter

Michael Hogan (17 September 1893 – 1 January 1977) was a British screenwriter. Hogan had previously been a notable film actor, appearing in lead roles in a number of silent and early sound films. Hogan worked as a writer in both Britain and Hollywood.

== Selected filmography ==
Actor

- Bolibar (1928)
- Ag and Bert (1929) comedy short film made in Phonofilm, directed by Bertram Phillips and co-starring Mabel Constanduros
- Windjammer (1930)
- The Lyons Mail (1931)
- Dance Pretty Lady (1932)
- The Mayor's Nest (1932)
- The Flag Lieutenant (1932)
- The Man Outside (1933)
- The River Wolves (1934)
- My Old Dutch (1934)
- The Queen's Affair (1934)
- The Last Journey (1936)

Screenwriter

- Squibs (1935)
- The Passing of the Third Floor Back (1935)
- Take My Tip (1937)
- King Solomon's Mines (1937)
- A Yank at Oxford (1938)
- Trouble Brewing (1939)
- Nurse Edith Cavell (1939)
- Secret Journey (1939)
- Rebecca (1940)
- South of Suez (1940)
- They Came by Night (1940)
- The Prime Minister (1941)
- Lady from Louisiana (1941)
- Forever and a Day (1943)
- Appointment in Berlin (1943)
- Tall in the Saddle (1944)
- Fortunes of Captain Blood (1950)

== Bibliography ==
- Duncan, Paul. Alfred Hitchcock: Architect of Anxiety, 1899-1980. Taschen, 2003.
- Low, Rachael. History of the British Film, 1918-1929. George Allen & Unwin, 1971.
