= The Black Tulip =

1850 novel by Alexandre Dumas

- Author: Alexandre Dumas
- Original title: La Tulipe Noire
- Language: French
- Genre: Historical, Romantic
- Publisher: Baudry, Paris 1850
- Publication date: 1850 (France)
- Publication place: France
- Pages: 234 (Penguin Classics Edition)
- ISBN: 978-0-14-044892-4 (Penguin Classics Edition)
- OCLC: 51528417
- Dewey Decimal: 843/.7 22
- LC Class: PQ2229.T8 E5 2003
- Text: The Black Tulip at Wikisource

The Black Tulip is a historical novel and a work of Romantic poetry written by Alexandre Dumas, père, and first published in 1850.

== Story ==
The story begins in 1672, with a historic event: the lynching of the Dutch Grand Pensionary Johan de Witt and his brother Cornelis, considered rebels against the upcoming stadtholder and the Prince of Orange, William III.

The plot takes place while tulip mania grips the Netherlands. The main fictional character, Cornelius Van Baerle, belongs to the natural school whose motto was: "To despise flowers is to offend God", and thus followed the syllogism:

"To despise flowers is to offend God,
The more beautiful the flower is, the more does one offend God in despising it,
The tulip is the most beautiful of all flowers,
Therefore, he who despises the tulip offends God beyond measure". (p. 46, The Black Tulip)

The city of Haarlem has offered a prize of 100,000 francs to whoever can grow a black tulip. At stake was not only the prize, but fame and honour; the winner would also have his name included in that given to the tulip itself.

The prosperous Cornelius Van Baerle, godson of Cornelius de Witt, is known in his locale for the growing of tulips and he takes up the challenge to grow a black tulip. His neighbour, Isaac Boxtel who is also a gardener, watches his every move and fearing Cornelius' success, starts plotting. Boxtel, motivated by envy, denounces Van Baerle because of his relation to the brothers De Witt who are both now considered traitors.

Van Baerle is arrested and condemned to a life sentence in prison. Religious beliefs are used in the narrative for dramatic effect and also words such as "Fate", "Providence" and "Misfortune". Misfortune plays a major influence throughout the events of Van Baerle's life, but at the end turns out to be a major act of Providence, showing that God is always in control, both in sadness as in happiness.

In prison, Van Baerle meets the beautiful daughter of the jailer, Rosa Gryphus. Cornelius loses everything but had kept the bulbs of the tulips, which were expected to have black flowers. In the midst of loss and sorrow, Rosa helps him to grow the flower in the jail. His affection for Rosa (who is depicted as brave and virtuous) gives him courage to not give up his dreams.

The philosophy of the book is summed up in the quote "Sometimes one has suffered so much that he has the right never to be able to say, ‘I am too happy.’" (p. 204 The Black Tulip).

The novel was originally published in three volumes in 1850 as La Tulipe Noire by Baudry (Paris). The Count of Monte Cristo, also by Dumas, has similar themes of love, revenge and faith.

== Characters ==
- William, Prince of Orange, afterward William III, King of England.
- Louis XIV, King of France
- Cornelis de Witt, inspector of dikes at the Hague
- Johan de Witt, his brother, Grand Pensionary of Holland
- Colonel van Deeken, aide-de-camp to William of Orange
- Dr. Cornelius van Baerle, a tulip-fancier, godson of Cornelius de Witt
- Mynheer Isaac Boxtel, his rival
- Marquis de Louvois
- Count Tilly, captain of the cavalry of The Hague
- Mynheer Bowelt, deputy
- Mynheer d'Asperen, deputy
- The Recorder of the States
- Master van Spenser, a magistrate at Dort
- Tyckalaer, a surgeon at The Hague
- Gerard Dow
- Mynheer van Systens, burgomaster of Haarlem and president of its Horticultural Society
- Craeke, a confidential servant of John de Witt
- Gryphus, a jailer, Rosa's father
- Rosa, his daughter, in love with Cornelius van Baerle

== Reception ==
George Saintsbury described the novel as "charming in parts", but felt that Dumas had spun the story out to "an unconscionable length".

== Adaptations ==
The first screen adaptation appears to have been a silent 1921 Dutch-UK co-production directed by Maurits Binger and Frank Richardson. Alex Bryce directed a well-regarded UK adaptation of the novel in 1937, with Patrick Waddington as Cornelius Van Baerle. A five-part BBC miniseries debuted in August 1956 with Douglas Wilmer in the lead role. A second British miniseries appeared in September 1970. In 1988, Australia's Burbank production company created a 50-minute children's animated film from a bowdlerised version of the story.

A musical adaptation was written in 2004 by Kit Goldstein, and premiered at Union College in February 2005.

== See also ==
- Assassinations in fiction
- Tulip mania
