= Michael Pertwee =

English playwright and screenwriter (1916–1991)

Michael Henry Pertwee (24 April 1916, Kensington, London – 17 April 1991, Camden, London) was an English playwright and screenwriter.

== Career ==
Pertwee's credits included episodes of The Saint, Danger Man, Alfred Hitchcock Presents, B-And-B, Ladies Who Do, Hong Kong and many other films and TV series. For the stage he co-wrote the 1938 thriller Death on the Table. His 1971 stage farce Don't Just Lie There, Say Something! was adapted into the 1973 TV series Men of Affairs and the 1974 film Don't Just Lie There, Say Something!.

== Personal life ==
Pertwee was the son of screenwriter Roland Pertwee, the brother of Jon, a distant cousin of actor Bill, and the uncle of actor Sean.

Between 1952 and 1959, Pertwee was married to the actress Valerie French.

== Filmography ==
=== Writer ===
- Crackerjack (1938)
- Trouble in the Air (1948)
- The Interrupted Journey (1949)
- Something in the City (1950)
- Black Jack (1950)
- Laughter in Paradise (1951)
- Night Was Our Friend (1951)
- Happy Ever After (US title: Tonight's the Night) (1954) with Jack Davies
- Not Wanted on Voyage (1957)
- The Naked Truth (1957)
- Too Many Crooks (1959)
- It Started in Naples (1960)
- Make Mine Mink (1960)
- In the Doghouse (1962)
- The Mouse on the Moon (1963)
- Strange Bedfellows (1965)
- A Funny Thing Happened on the Way to the Forum (1966)
- Salt and Pepper (1968)
- One More Time (1970)
- Digby, the Biggest Dog in the World (1973)

=== Actor ===
- Laughter in Paradise (1951) – Stewart
- Night Was Our Friend (1951) – Young Man
- Now and Forever (1956) – Reporter (final film role)

== Novelisations ==
Among the novelisations of Michael Pertwee screenplays, each released shortly before its respective film, are:

- Salt and Pepper by Alex Austin
- One More Time by Michael Avallone
- Strange Bedfellows by Marvin H. Albert.

Each of the novelists was a notable author of the era.
