= Black Tulip (Ukraine) =

Fallen soldier recovery in Ukraine

Black Tulip is a volunteer organization in Ukraine whose purpose is to locate the bodies of missing Ukrainian soldiers and return them to their families in order to provide them with closure. The organization was initially focused on returning the bodies of soldiers from World War I and World War II. Since 2014 and the Russian invasion of Crimea, it has operated in the eastern Ukrainian regions of Donetsk and Luhansk.

The work is dangerous. Sometimes bodies are booby-trapped and the group operates at battlefields close to the front line. The exact number is not known, but many hundreds of bodies have been recovered and returned - for example, in July 2022 one volunteer reported having transported 300 bodies since the start of the Russian invasion of Ukraine that began in February 2022.

Volunteers not only exhume bodies for return to their families but also will exchange the bodies of Russian soldiers for the bodies of Ukrainian soldiers. The organization maintains a database of missing persons and allows the public to report burial sites and submit missing persons and to report finding a missing person.

Black Tulip was founded by Yaroslav Zhilkin when he was the head of the Union People's Memory All-Ukrainian Public Organization within the Ministry of Culture of Ukraine. Zhilkin has spent a considerable amount of his own money to support the organization, approximately $160,000 as of August 2015 along with contributions from others. The organization is reportedly largely self-financed by the volunteers. A Ukrainian church in the United States has been a significant contributor.

The organization's name was taken from the cargo planes used in the Soviet era that was used to return the bodies of dead soldiers.

It was founded by Oleksii Yukov.
