= The Black Tulip (1937 film) =

1937 British film by Alex Bryce

- Campbell Gullan and Patrick Waddington in the film
- Directed by: Alex Bryce
- Screenplay by: Cecil Maiden; Hugh Brooke
- Based on: The Black Tulip by Alexandre Dumas
- Produced by: John Findlay
- Starring: Patrick Waddington; Ann Soreen; Campbell Gullan
- Cinematography: Stanley Grant
- Music by: Colin Wark
- Production company: Fox-British Pictures
- Distributed by: 20th Century Fox
- Release date: 4 February 1937
- Running time: 57 minutes
- Country: United Kingdom
- Language: English

The Black Tulip is a 1937 British, black-and-white historical drama film directed by Alex Bryce and starring Patrick Waddington, Ann Soreen, Campbell Gullan and Bernard Lee. It was written by Cecil Maiden and Hugh Brooke based on the 1850 novel The Black Tulip by Alexandre Dumas, and was produced by Fox-British Pictures at Wembley Studios as a quota quickie.

== Premise ==
In the Dutch Republic in 1672, a wealthy man Cornelius Van Baerle devotes his life to growing tulips unaware of his family's close involvement with political intrigue.

== Cast ==
- Patrick Waddington as Cornelus Van Baerle
- Ann Soreen as Rosa
- Campbell Gullan as Isaac Boxtel
- Jay Laurier as Gryphus
- Wilson Coleman as Cornelius de Witt
- Bernard Lee as William III of Orange
- Florence Hunt as Julia Boxtel
- Ronald Shiner as Hendrik
- Aubrey Mallalieu as Colonel Marnix

== Reception ==
The Monthly Film Bulletin wrote: "The film is slow, and the acting is mediocre. Only a long course of believing six impossible things before breakfast would make van Baerle's escape credible. The sets are poor, and the cross country chase through obviously English lanes is absurd."

The Daily Film Renter wrote: "Straightforward story marked by simplicity but not particularly distinguished from angles of acting or direction. This version of famous classic should have some following from readers of novel, and there is charm in camera studies of Dutch countryside. Fair entertainment for not too sophisticated patrons."

Kine Weekly wrote: "Unfortunately the superb story-telling genius of Alexandre Dumas fails to gain anything like adequate representation on the screen. The plot is but a shrunken shadow of the original, and there is nothing in the acting and presentation to conver the bare bones."

Picture Show wrote: "The colourful costumes and picturesque settings help the film considerably, and it makes agreeable, if comparatively unexciting entertainment. Competently acted and directed."

Picturegoer wrote: "Bearing only a remote resemblance to the original, there is not much to recommend in this romantic drama. ... It is all very thin and there is little imagination or dramatic force either in development or direction."
