= Ralph Truman =

British actor (1900–1977)

- 1939 Spotlight photo
- Born: Ralph du Vergier Truman; 7 May 1900; London, England
- Died: 15 October 1977 (aged 77); Ipswich, Suffolk, England
- Occupation: Actor
- Years active: 1925–1975
- Spouse: Ellis Powell (m. 1928; died 1963)

Ralph du Vergier Truman (7 May 1900 – 15 October 1977) was an English actor, usually cast as either a villain or an authority figure. He possessed a distinguished speaking voice. He was born in London, England.

Truman originally studied at the Royal College of Music and was a regular performer on the radio from 1925, appearing in an estimated 5,000 broadcasts.

His best-remembered film roles include Tigellinus in MGM's Quo Vadis (1951), the French herald Mountjoy in Laurence Olivier's film Henry V (1944), the evil Monks in David Lean's Oliver Twist (1948), George Merry in the Walt Disney version of Treasure Island (1950), and the Police Inspector in Alfred Hitchcock's The Man Who Knew Too Much (1956). He also appeared in episodes of several TV series, including Danger Man.

He died 15 October 1977 in Ipswich, Suffolk aged 77.

== Selected filmography ==
- City of Song (1931) (uncredited)
- The Bells (1931) as Blacksmith
- The Shadow (1933) as Elliot
- The Perfect Flaw (1934) as Richard Drexel
- Lieut. Daring R.N. (1935) as Mung
- D'Ye Ken John Peel? (1935) as 1st Ruffian Footman
- The Lad (1935) as O'Shea (uncredited)
- Three Witnesses (1935) as Bellman
- That's My Uncle (1935) as Monty
- The Case of Gabriel Perry (1935) as Inspector White
- The Silent Passenger (1935) as Saunders
- Jubilee Window (1935) as Dan Stevens
- Father O'Flynn (1935) as Fawcett
- Late Extra (1935) as Minor Role (uncredited)
- Captain Bill (1936) as Red
- Mr. Cohen Takes a Walk (1936) as Sam Cohen
- The Crimson Circle (1936) as Lawrence Fuller
- The Marriage of Corbal (1936) as Charles
- The Gay Adventure (1936) as Buck
- East Meets West (1936) as Abdul
- Fire Over England (1937) as Spanish Inquisition Representative (uncredited)
- Secret Lives (1937) as Prison Guard (uncredited)
- The Lilac Domino (1937) as Doorman (uncredited)
- Under the Red Robe (1937) as Captain at Castle
- Silver Blaze (1937) as Bert Prince
- Change for a Sovereign (1937) as Archduke Paul
- Dinner at the Ritz (1937) as Auctioneer
- It's a Grand Old World (1937) as Banks
- South Riding (1938) as Nursing Home Doctor (uncredited)
- The Drum (1938) as Dinner Guest (uncredited)
- The Challenge (1938) as Giordano
- Many Tanks Mr. Atkins (1938) as Zanner
- Life of St. Paul (1938) as Orderly
- The Outsider (1939) as Sir Nathan Israel
- Black Eyes (1939) as Diner
- The Saint in London (1939) as Kussella
- Just like a Woman (1939) as Maharajah
- The Seventh Survivor (1942) as Captain
- Sabotage at Sea (1942) as Horace Chandler
- The Butler's Dilemma (1943) as Bishop
- Henry V (1944) as Mountjoy, The French Herald
- Lisbon Story (1946) as Police Commissionaire
- Beware of Pity (1946) as Maj. Sandor Balinkay
- The Laughing Lady (1946) as Lord Mandeville
- Woman to Woman (1947) as Colonel
- Dusty Bates (1947) as Merryvale
- Mrs. Fitzherbert (1947) as Richard Brinsley Sheridan
- Oliver Twist (1948) as Monks
- Mr. Perrin and Mr. Traill (1948) as Comber
- Eureka Stockade (1949) as Gov. Hotham
- Christopher Columbus (1949) as Captain
- The Interrupted Journey (1949) as Inspector Waterson
- The Reluctant Widow (1950) as Scowler
- Treasure Island (1950) as George Merry
- Quo Vadis (1951) as Tigellinus
- The Golden Coach (1952) as Duc de Castro
- Malta Story (1953) as Vice Adm Willie Banks
- The Master of Ballantrae (1953) as Maj. Clarendon
- Knights of the Round Table (1953) as King Marr (uncredited)
- Beau Brummell (1954) as Sir Ralph Sidley
- The Night My Number Came Up (1955) as Wainwright
- The Ship That Died of Shame (1955) as Sir Richard
- Tons of Trouble (1956) as Inspector Bridger
- The Black Tent (1956) as Maj. Croft
- The Man Who Knew Too Much (1956) as Inspector Buchanan
- Wicked as They Come (1956) as John Dowling
- The Long Arm (1956) as Colonel Blenkinsop
- The Silken Affair (1956) as Minor Role (uncredited)
- The Good Companions (1957) as Memsford
- Yangtse Incident: The Story of H.M.S. Amethyst (1957) as Vice-Admiral
- The Spaniard's Curse (1958) as Sir Robert Wyvern
- Beyond This Place (1959) as Sir Matthew Sprott
- Ben-Hur (1959) as Aide to Tiberius (uncredited)
- Under Ten Flags (1960) as Admiral Benson
- Exodus (1960) as Colonel
- El Cid (1961) as King Ferdinand
- Nicholas and Alexandra (1971) as Rodzianko
- Lady Caroline Lamb (1972) as Admiral
