= Patrick Waddington =

English actor (1901–1987)

- Born: 19 August 1901; York, England
- Died: 4 February 1987 (aged 85); York, England
- Education: St John's College, Oxford
- Occupation: Actor

Patrick William Simpson Waddington (19 August 1901 – 4 February 1987) was an English actor, educated at Gresham's School at Holt in Norfolk. He was born and died in York, England.

== Biography ==
Patrick Waddington was the grandson of William Waddington, the piano manufacturer who also took over the management of the Theatre Royal York. After Gresham's School and St John's College, Oxford, he started his career singing, and in the 1930s was in That Certain Trio with Peggy Cochrane. On stage from 1924, often in upper-class roles, his theatre work included the original West End run of Patrick Hamilton's Rope in 1929; a lengthy tour of My Fair Lady, as Colonel Pickering, in 1963–1965; and the musical Kean on Broadway, in 1961. Film and television work included The Wooden Horse (1950), A Night to Remember (1958), and two episodes of Dad's Army, as 'The Brigadier'.

In 1951, Waddington became General Secretary of TACT (The Actors Charitable Trust) and was headmaster of its children's home, Silverlands, until 1953. A plaque to commemorate him can be seen in the Courtyard entrance to the Merchant Adventurers' Hall in York. He was a member of the Company of Merchant Adventurers of the City of York from 1933 to his death in 1987. In 1986, Waddington self-published his autobiography, Patrick: Or, That Awful Warning.

== Filmography ==
- If Youth But Knew (1926) - Arthur Noel-Vane
- Loyalties (1933) - Augustus Borring
- The Loves of Madame Dubarry (1935) - René
- The Black Tulip (1937) - Cornelus Van Baerle
- Journey Together (1945) - Flight Lt Mander
- Gaiety George (1946) - Lt Travers
- School for Secrets (1946) - Group Captain Aspinall
- The Clouded Crystal (1948) - Jack
- It's Not Cricket (1949) - Valentine Christmas
- That Dangerous Age (1949) - Rosley
- Stop Press Girl (1949) - Airline Director (uncredited)
- The Wooden Horse (1950) - Senior British Officer
- The fire lake where the old man walks (1956)
- Wideawake (1957) - Male, senior
- The White Cliffs Mystery (1957) - Matrion
- O.S.S.: Operation Big House (1957) - German Ambassador
- Rx Murder (1958) - Sir George Watson
- The Moonraker (1958) - Lord Dorset
- A Night to Remember (1958) - Sir Richard
- Battle of the V-1 (1958) - Air Marshal (uncredited)
- Play of the Week: Mary Stuart (1960) - Leicester
- Naked City: The Man Who Bit a Diamond in Half (1960) - Mitcham
- The Jazz Age: The Outstation (1968) - Lord Hollington
- Armchair Theatre: The Mandarins (1969) - Sir Henry
- Dad's Army: The Showing Up of Corporal Jones (1968) - The Brigadier
- Dad's Army: The Loneliness of the Long Distance Walker (1969) (Lost) - The Brigadier
- Department S: Who Plays the Dummy? (1969) - NATO General

== Bibliography ==
- Waddington, Patrick S. (1986). Patrick: Or, That Awful Warning. Self-published. ISBN 0-951132601.
