= Will Fyffe =

Scottish actor and entertainer (1885–1947)

Will Fyffe CBE
- Born: 16 February 1885; Dundee, Scotland
- Died: 14 December 1947 (aged 62); St Andrews, Scotland
- Occupations: Actor, Singer
- Years active: 1914–1947 (film)

Will Fyffe, CBE (16 February 1885 – 14 December 1947) was a Scottish music hall and performing artist on stage and screen during the 1930s and 1940s.

Fyffe made his debut in his father's stock company at age 6. He travelled extensively throughout Scotland and the rest of the UK, playing the numerous music halls of the time, where he performed his sketches and sang his songs in an inimitable style. During the 1930s, he was one of the highest paid musical hall artists in Britain.

In addition, Fyffe appeared in 23 major films of the era (American and British), and he recorded over 30 songs.

His singer-songwriter skills are still well-known today, particularly his composition "I Belong to Glasgow". This song has been covered by Danny Kaye, Eartha Kitt, Gracie Fields and Kirk Douglas:

"If your money, you spend,
You've nothing to lend,
Isn't that all the better for you"

As a result of this song, Fyffe became forever associated with Glasgow, but he was born 70 miles (110 km) away in the east coast city of Dundee, where a street bears his surname. Fyffe was also Freemason, who was initiated and then became a full member of Lodge St John, Shotts No 471. He left some rare footage of his stage act, which gives a glimpse of stage life in these times. In the footage, he performs the "Broomielaw" sketch and sings his song "Twelve and a Tanner a Bottle". The footage came about as a result of a screen test, shot for Pathe in New York in 1929.

Fyffe died after falling from a window in the Rusacks Hotel in St Andrews in December 1947. The fall has been attributed to dizziness caused by an operation on his ear.

== Early life and career ==
Will Fyffe was born on 16 February 1885 in a tenement at 36 Broughty Ferry Road, Dundee, the eldest child of John Fyffe (1864–1928), a ship's carpenter, and Janet Rhynd Cunningham (1858–1949), a music teacher.

His father was interested in theatrical entertainment and operated a Penny Geggy, in which Will gained experience as a character actor.

In his 20s, Fyffe joined Will Haggar Junior's Castle Theatre company, touring the South Wales Valleys from its base in Abergavenny. Fyffe and his wife are featured in an advert for the Castle Theatre in the Portable Times in 1911.

Fyffe's screen debut was in 1914 when William Haggar, Will Junior's father and a pioneer silent film producer, made a 50-minute version of the classic Welsh tale The Maid of Cefn Ydfa, which was first screened in Aberdare in December of that year. Reviewed in The South Wales Echo in 1938, the film disappeared, but was rediscovered in 1984 in a family cupboard and conserved. 38 minutes survives in the Welsh Film Archive in Aberystwyth. In the film, Fyffe plays Lewis Bach, the loyal servant of the maid. He appealed against conscription in 1918 on grounds of his occupation, serious hardship and ill health.

As a character actor, he was much in demand in Hollywood and Britain, starring and co-starring in dozens of productions, with Finlay Currie, Patricia Roc, John Laurie, Duncan MacRae, John Gielgud, Douglas Fairbanks Jr, Margaret Lockwood and Charles Hawtrey. His last film was The Brothers, released shortly after his death. In Owd Bob, (To the Victor in America), Fyffe plays the 'likeable old curmudgeon' McAdam,. The New York Times describes Fyffe's performance as fitting "snugly into the mental dossier we have been compiling under the heading 'great performances'". Ted Black at Gainsborough Pictures promoted Fyffe's persona in a series of pictures.

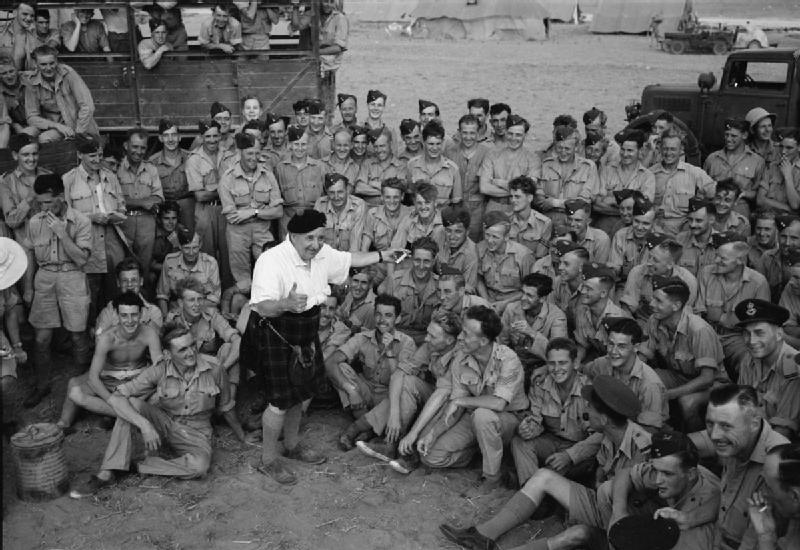
Fyffe entertains men of the RAF Regiment in the open air at Hammamet, Tunisia, during his tour of North Africa.

Although he became well known as a talented actor for the breadth of his on-screen characterisations, Fyffe was a successful music hall artist (singer-songwriter and comedian), creating a succession of comic characters, whose story he narrated with his unique form of delivery. Fyffe would start his song, pausing in the middle to give a monologue with details of the song's story, then resume the song where he left off. Daft Sandy, the village idiot, was one of Fyffe's more popular characters. The drama critic James Agate referred to this as "a masterpiece of tragi-comedy".

In 1937, Fyffe appeared in the Royal Command Performance at the London Palladium, one of numerous appearances, and he became regarded as Queen Elizabeth's favourite entertainer. As one local commentator put it:

"...we are sure the lasting thrill for us all was the finale, Will Fyffe, a wonderful Scottish comedian, was top of the bill. To finish, he sang a song. On the second chorus, the scenery changed completely, and down the aisles came Scottish Pipers. The artists all appeared around a rostrum in front of the orchestra, and we filled the stage, in Scout uniform complete with red scarf. It was the greatest thrill of our young lives. As the National Anthem was played, we faced the Royal Box and sang as we had never sung before."

For a period, Fyffe developed a successful stage partnership with Harry Gordon, playing with him in pantomime for many years, most notably at the famed Alhambra Theatre Glasgow.

In 1939, Fyffe was the ninth most popular British star at the box office. He was appointed a Commander of the Order of the British Empire (CBE) in the 1942 Birthday Honours.

=== "I Belong to Glasgow" ===
It was when Fyffe wrote and recorded the song "I Belong to Glasgow" that he became a worldwide star. According to Albert Mackie's The Scotch Comedians (1973), Fyffe found the inspiration for the song from a drunk he met at Glasgow Central Station. The drunk was "genial and demonstrative" and "laying off about Karl Marx and John Barleycorn with equal enthusiasm". Fyffe asked him "Do you belong to Glasgow?", and the man replied "At the moment, at the moment, Glasgow belongs to me."

The song is believed to have been written in 1920, but it is unclear if it was first released that year. A known release of the song in 1921 shows it as a B side to "I'm 94 To-Day". The song was released as an A side in 1927.

He was so popular that the Empire Theatre in Glasgow ran a 'Will Fyffe' competition, with dozens of entrants singing "I Belong to Glasgow". Heavily disguised as himself, Fyffe entered the competition for a bet, but he only won the second prize. According to theatre manager and historian, W. J. MacQueen-Pope: "Will Fyffe was a man of great honesty and integrity", and these traits comes across in his songs when heard today.

Fyffe died by falling from a hotel room window. After an operation on his right ear in 1947, Fyffe went to recuperate at his own hotel in St Andrews. One night, he fell from the window of his suite and was taken to the local cottage hospital, where he later died.

Fyffe was buried in his adopted home city of Glasgow, at Lambhill Cemetery, three days later.

Fyffe was survived by a son Will Fyffe Jnr (1927–2008), a musical director who wrote a musical about his father's life, and a daughter, Eileen.

== Filmography ==
- The Maid of Cefn Ydfa (1914, Short) - Lewis Bach
- Elstree Calling (1930) - Himself
- Happy (1933) - Simmy
- Rolling Home (1935) - John McGregor
- Debt of Honour (1936) - Fergus McAndrews
- Love in Exile (1936) - Doc Tate
- Men of Yesterday (1936)
- Well Done, Henry (1936) - Henry McNab
- King of Hearts (1936) - Bill Saunders
- Spring Handicap (1937) - Jack Clayton
- Cotton Queen (1937) - Bill Todcastle
- Said O'Reilly to McNab (1937) - Malcolm McNab
- Owd Bob (1938) - Adam McAdam
- The Mind of Mr. Reeder (1939) - J.G. Reeder
- Annie Laurie (1939) - Will Laurie
- The Missing People (1939) - J. G. Reeder
- Rulers of the Sea (1939) - John Shaw
- They Came by Night (1940) - James Fothergill
- For Freedom (1940) - Chief
- Neutral Port (1940) - Capt. Ferguson
- Welfare of the Workers (1940) - Himself
- The Prime Minister (1941) - The Agitator
- Heaven Is Round the Corner (1944) - Dougal
- Give Me the Stars (1944) - Hector MacTavish
- The Brothers (1947) - Aeneas McGrath (final film role)

== Discography ==
Ah'm Feart for Mrs. McKie (1931)
Clyde Built
Corporal McDougall (1939)
Daft Sandy (1930)
Doctor McGregor (1926)
Down in the Quarry Where the Bluebells Grow (1926)
He's Been Oan the Bottle Since a Baby (1932)
I Belong to Glasgow (1927) (Animated footage)
I'm 94 Today (1929) (Live footage)
I'm the Landlord of the Inn in Aberfoyle (1932)
It Isn't the Hen That Cackles the Most
McPherson's Wedding Breakfast (1930)
Sailing Up the Clyde (1927)
She Was the Belle of the Ball (1929)
Sheila McKay (1929)
The Skipper of the Mercantile Marine (1939)
The Centenarian (1927)
The Gamekeeper (1927)
The Railway Guard (1930)
The Spirit O the Man Fae Aberdeen (1931, Walsh & Fyffe)
The Train That's Taking You Home (1929)
The Waddin O Mary Maclean (1931, Martin & Fyffe)
Twelve and a Tanner a Bottle (1929) (Live footage)
Uncle Mac (1931)
Ye Can Come and See the Baby (1927)
The 'Broomielaw' Sketch (1929) (Live footage)

== Archive footage ==
The Scottish Screen Archive (includes the "Broomielaw" sketch and the song "Twelve and a Tanner a Bottle".
