= The Missing People =

1940 film

- U.S. 1-sheet poster
- Directed by: Jack Raymond
- Written by: Lydia Hayward
- Based on: The Missing People by Edgar Wallace
- Produced by: Charles Q. Steel
- Starring: Will Fyffe; Kay Walsh; Lyn Harding
- Cinematography: George Stretton
- Music by: Percival Mackey
- Production company: Jack Raymond Productions
- Distributed by: Grand National Pictures (UK)
- Release date: 13 January 1940 (UK)
- Running time: 73 minutes
- Country: United Kingdom
- Language: English

The Missing People is a 1940 British mystery film directed by Jack Raymond and starring Will Fyffe, Kay Walsh and Lyn Harding. It was written by Lydia Hayward based on a novel by Edgar Wallace.

== Synopsis ==
Mr. Reeder, an investigator for the Department of Public Prosecutions, begins solving the disappearance of 27 people, after they had each received large sums of money from their respective families. Is the criminal-featured Joseph Bronstone, the guilty party?

== Cast ==
- Will Fyffe as J. G. Reeder
- Kay Walsh as Peggy Gillette
- Lyn Harding as Joseph Bronstone
- Ronald Shiner as Sam Hackett
- Patricia Roc as Doris Bevan
- Anthony Holles as Ernest Bronstone
- Reginald Purdell as Harry Morgan
- Maire O'Neill as housekeeper

== Production ==
It was shot at Highbury Studios in London.

== Critical reception ==
The Monthly Film Bulletin wrote: "Will Fyffe, although perhaps falling short of some people's idea of J. G. Reeder, undoubtedly gives a fine performance as this character of Edgar Wallace, which is all the more praiseworthy as a complete departure from his usual characterisations. Lyn Harding as Brandstone the solicitor is rather theatrical. The rest of the cast give a sound backing to a film which grips right from the start."

Kine Weekly wrote: "The story leaves much that is unexplained, the first half is wordy, and the climax, the one big moment of hectic action, is detmitely Lyceum, but no matter, the film registers in spite, or rather because of, its faults, Its whole-hearted success is a tribute both to the resourcefulness of Will Fyffe and the wisdom of Jack Raymond, who has cleverly caught the author's flair for getting a kick out of the obvious."

TV Guide wrote, "Fyffe adds a great deal of charm to his role as he pieces the puzzle together in a manner baffling to the younger detectives. Otherwise, the plot is unbelievable but makes for some light-hearted fun."
