= Mike Tucker (The Archers) =

Fictional character from the British BBC Radio 4 soap opera, The Archers

- The Archers character
- Terry Molloy as Mike Tucker
- Portrayed by: Gareth Armstrong; Alexander Wilson; Terry Molloy
- Duration: 1973–1977, 1983–2014, 2021–2022
- First appearance: 1973
- Last appearance: 13 January 2022
- Created by: Tony Shryane
In-universe information
- Occupation: Milkman
- Wife: Betty Tucker (until 2005); Vicky Tucker
- Sons: Roy Tucker
- Daughters: Brenda Tucker; Bethany Tucker
- Granddaughters: Phoebe Aldridge; Abbie Tucker

Mike Tucker is a fictional character from the British BBC Radio 4 soap opera The Archers. Described upon his introduction in 1973 as "the Milkman from Hell", Mike has developed over five decades to become a family man whose grumpy demeanour and gruff attitude won favour with listeners. Radio and television actor Terry Molloy was cast in 1973 by producer Tony Shryane and stayed for four years until leaving the show in 1977, only to return in 1983. He remained on the show for 40 years, making Molloy one of the longest-serving soap opera actors in the world.

Mike is the husband of Vicky Tucker, and the father of Roy, Brenda and Bethany Tucker. He is also a close friend to Neil Carter and Ed Grundy. Since 1973, Mike has suffered bankruptcy, depression, attempted suicide, the loss of an eye, the loss of his first wife and being knocked down by a car.

Molloy says his character is a "relentlessly honest son of the soil" who "tolerates fools with no gladness whatsoever".

== Creation and casting ==
Actor Gareth Armstrong originated the role of Mike. He would later go on to play a postman, a Bishop and Sean Myerson, the first openly gay character. Of this, he commented "I use a different voice from when I played Mike Tucker in case there are sharp-eared listeners with long memories." Alexander Wilson also played the role.

In 1973, the producer of The Archers at the time, Tony Shryane, called Terry Molloy to audition for the role of Mike. Molloy was aware that the role had already been cast, and that the actor left after one episode to join The Rep. The role of Mike was initially only to last for five weeks. Molloy started the following day, as the voices matched perfectly, he remembers. "There were very few cast then – about 23 in total," Molloy recalls. "My first real experience of the effect Ambridge has on the country was in touring a play. This lovely little old lady came up to me and said 'you play Mike Tucker in The Archers, don't you?'. I said 'Yes I do' and suddenly got whacked round the head with her handbag. She raged at me about Mike being such a toe rag."

== Development ==
=== Early years ===
In his fictional backstory, Mike Tucker was born on 1 December 1949. He arrived in Ambridge in 1973, taking over the herd at Brookfield for Ambridge Farmers. A young socialist, Mike got up the nose of local magistrate Phil Archer. The character brought his wife, Betty (Pamela Craig), to town too and the pair become a formidable force in Ambridge. "He was quite a lad at the time, a bit of a socialist, and got up Phil Archer's nose," Molloy remembers. "Mike didn't suffer fools gladly and generally only opened his mouth to change feet. A bit of a moaner, he went off and got his own tenancy from Haydn Evans, taking on Willow Farm." Mike and Betty left the village in 1977.

=== Return to Ambridge ===
Unable to buy out his old boss Hadyn Evans, Mike took over the tenancy at Ambridge Farm in 1983. But it wasn't mean to be, and Mike went bankrupt in 1986 after struggling for years with his small milk round and farm. Betty hunted around for work and managed to find a job cleaning the Aldridge's house, while Mike became a milkman for Borchester Dairies. Molloy, in an interview joked once: "Mike has had his low points: we used to joke "how do you make Mike Tucker a millionaire? Start him off as a billionaire, 'cos he'll lose most of it." He went bankrupt, which led to a depression. He very nearly killed himself. It's down to Vanessa (Whitburn, former editor) who said she liked the character, so the writers found another way around it." "This was a very powerful storyline which touched a lot of people – as do many storylines. A vicar came up to me once and thanked me for playing Mike's depression – it was like therapy for him to listen and realise that he wasn't alone in going through it. These stories do have a real effect on people out there."

=== Losing an eye ===
In 1991, Mike lost his eye in a farming accident, for which local business tycoon Brian Aldridge was found to be responsible. Mike then slipped into depression, putting pressure on Betty as the sole breadwinner. Their fortunes turned later that year when Mike was awarded £33,000 compensation for the accident. It was enough for the couple to buy Willow Farmhouse. "It all looked as black and dismal as it possibly could but he got compensation," ."Instead of doing what he wanted, which was buying loads of forestry gear, Betty insisted on putting down a deposit so they could buy Willow Farm – and they got it. So things started to go up. With Roy and Brenda they had a good family. Mike was madly working, and Betty was working in the shop. Part of Mike's depression was seeing Betty doing all the work – what he felt was a man's job. So over time we've seen Mike go from being an old man to a 'reconstituted' or 'new' man."

=== Betty's death ===
Betty Tucker was killed off in 2005 following two heart attacks in the space of a week at Willow Farm. The decision to end the character was made after Craig decided to leave the show after 30 years and retire to New Zealand. Molloy recalls being told that the show's bosses did not want to recast the role. "Interestingly, we'd been there together for over 30 years – I'd been married to her longer than anyone in real life," he joked.

=== Finding new love with Vicky ===
Vicky Hudson swooped into the life of Mike Tucker soon after Betty's death, dividing opinion across the village. Many felt she was trying far too hard to win his approval, whereas most of the men merely winked at Mike in appreciative approval. Her swift installation in the Tucker household left Mike's daughter Brenda poleaxed. But things took an unexpected turn when Vicky became pregnant, and discovered that the baby would have Down syndrome. After a struggle, Mike committed to Vicky and the child. And the turmoil reconciled Vicky and Brenda too. Bethany was born on 16 January 2013. "At first, the intention may have been that she was a bit of a money grabber, but the character worked so well and we worked well together that she stayed," Molloy remembers.

As Bethany approached school age, it became clear that she would require more support than was available in rural South Borsetshire, driving Mike and Vicky to move to Birmingham and so leave the show. He made a few brief reappearances, but no longer has family in the village.

== Reception ==
Ahead of the character's departure from the show, Nancy Banks-Smith of The Guardian stated: "Milkmen are traditionally cheery, but Mike Tucker broke the mould. Mark you, his life was one damn thing after another, so, when he finally said, 'We won't be here much longer', you wondered if he meant death or Birmingham. He meant Birmingham."
