= Michael O'Donnell (physician) =

British physician, journalist, author, and broadcaster (1928–2019)

Michael O'Donnell (20 October 1928 – 6 April 2019) was a British physician, journalist, author and broadcaster.

He became a full-time writer after working for 12 years as a doctor. On BBC Radio Four he was the last chairman and word-setter of My Word! and wrote and presented Relative Values. On BBC Television he presented the O'Donnell Investigates series and, on Yorkshire Television, the controversial Tuesday Documentary Is Your Brain Really Necessary?. He worked as a newspaper and magazine columnist, published three novels, edited World Medicine, wrote and presented over 100 television and radio documentaries, and helped found the charity HealthWatch.

== Early career ==
He was born in Yorkshire, the son of a general practitioner, and educated at Stonyhurst College and Trinity Hall, Cambridge, where he studied Natural Sciences. At Cambridge he joined the Footlights and appeared in La Vie Cambridgienne (1948), the first Footlights revue televised by the BBC. He was also a member of the Young Writer's Group founded by Stephen Joseph and succeeded Joseph as editor of Cambridge Writing. His short story A Sense of Value was later reprinted, with a commendation from E. M. Forster, in an anthology of post-war Cambridge writing.

He completed his medical training at St Thomas' Hospital paying his way through the clinical course by working as a part-time scriptwriter at the BBC Variety Department, a petrol pump attendant in Streatham, and a stage lighting technician for the theatrical producers H. M. Tennent. He also teamed up with the pianist Catherine Dorrington Ward, who later became his wife, to form a cabaret act. When he applied for admission to St Thomas's, he opened his interview with a tentative question, 'Could this hospital countenance the notion of a part-time medical student?' To which the Medical School Secretary replied, 'Is there any other kind?

After qualifying as a doctor in 1952 he worked as a GP first in Fulham, then in Weybridge, Surrey. In 1964, when he retired from clinical medicine to become a professional writer, he worked for a time as a copywriter at the J Walter Thompson advertising agency, was a co-presenter and writer of the Associated Television (ATV) series You'd Never Believe It and wrote three television plays for ATV using the pseudonym Michael Bancroft.

== World Medicine ==
In 1965 he became a columnist on the newly launched magazine World Medicine and, a year later, was appointed editor, a post he held for 16 years.

World Medicine was unlike any other medical publication. According to journalist Paul Vaughan, 'O'Donnell was a remarkable medical editor, a man who had ricocheted gaily between the professions of medicine and journalism, with an occasional lurch into the theatre… He now contrived to bring all these talents together as editor of World Medicine and … established it as a bright entertaining and - in terms of medical politics - radical newcomer'.

O'Donnell himself claimed his editorial approach drew heavily on his experience in Weybridge in the 1950s when local GPs met at the Cottage Hospital after their morning surgeries to drink coffee and exchange ideas and gossip. 'It was a time for passing on what we had learned of the clinical facts of life, and for seeking one another's advice about real problems in real patients. What made those conversations memorable were the irreverence and scepticism with which they were conducted, qualities rarely encountered in the world of medicine as it was written about. In those days, medical journals portrayed a more solemn universe than that in which we and our patients seemed to be living. When serendipity parked me in an editor's chair, I decided I wouldn't just report news about medicine but would try to reflect the uncertainties, the paradoxes, and the black comedy that make practising our craft so rewarding.'

World Medicine attracted a large and intensely loyal readership but in 1982, after a dispute with the publishers over editorial policy, O'Donnell was forced to leave. The senior editorial staff resigned in sympathy and 'most of his more talented contributors stopped writing for the magazine in a rare demonstration of self-sacrificial sympathy and protest.' The publication folded two years later. With a new editor and new staff, it lacked, according to Paul Vaughan, 'the mercurial wit and verve that were O'Donnell's trademark.'

An editorial in the British Medical Journal (BMJ) commented. 'Michael O'Donnell, whose appointment as editor of World Medicine was abruptly ended two weeks ago, has put both the profession and the public in his debt. He has campaigned vigorously and successfully for the apparently impossible, such as reform of the GMC; he has got doctors to laugh at themselves and their practices; he has highlighted the pettiness of the jacks-in-office and their new bureaucracy; and he has exposed awkwardness that the Establishment would sooner have forgotten about. … Not to have read Michael O'Donnell's World Medicine was to have been incomplete as a doctor'.

== Writer and broadcaster ==
After leaving World Medicine, O'Donnell expanded his career as a freelance writer and broadcaster. He published three novels and was a columnist for The Times, a job from which he withdrew when the editor Harold Evans was forced to resign. He then wrote regular columns for The Guardian, New Scientist and Vogue and the first signed weekly column to be published by the BMJ (1983–86). Later he was a regular contributor to The Listener and Punch.

O'Donnell wrote and presented over 100 television and radio documentaries. They included the ground-breaking BBC Television series O'Donnell Investigates... (1985–89) which presented the links emerging in the 1980s between diet, social behaviour, and disease, and two Tuesday documentaries for Yorkshire Television (YTV): Part of Life (1981), which explored the nature of teenage suicide, and Is Your Brain Really Necessary? (1982). He was scientific adviser on the Lindsay Anderson film O Lucky Man! (1973) and for a number of YTV popular science programmes, including Don't Ask Me, Don't Just Sit There, and Where There's Life (1979–83)

On Radio 4 he was the last chairman of My Word! ( 1983–90), the panel game with Frank Muir and Denis Norden, and wrote and presented the award-winning series Relative Values (1987–97) which the radio critic Anne Karpf nominated as her favourite programme. 'Crucial to its success is Michael O'Donnell whose interviewing technique is spare, not to say minimalist, and isn't a lump-in-the-throat heavy empathy guy. O'Donnell has no hint of the Moral Majority about him but, though uncensorious, he doesn't idealise or try to act the shrink.'

He appeared regularly on Stop The Week, with Robert Robinson as chairman, and wrote and presented the series Utopia and Other Destinations (1996–98), Murder, Medicine, and Magic (1998–2001), and The Age-old Dilemma (2007).

== GMC 'rebel' ==
Before 1969 the only contact most UK doctors had with their self-regulatory body the General Medical Council (GMC) was when they qualified and paid a one-off fee to have their names entered on the Medical Register, a list of doctors the GMC deemed adequately trained to practice medicine. But, that year, the GMC announced that in future doctors would have to pay an Annual Retention Fee (ARF) to remain on the Register. The fee angered doctors who believed they had a lifetime contract and were not keen to finance the GMC's "expansionist ambitions" In a postal ballot, 11,540 World Medicine readers voted against the ARF and only 466 in favour.

O'Donnell saw the imposition of the ARF as an opportunity to reform an institution which he claimed was undemocratic and unrepresentative. Only 11 of the GMC's 46 members were elected. The others were appointed by the Universities, Royal Colleges and the Privy Council. All were white and only one was a woman. The council, he wrote, often gave the impression that it represented 'a medical establishment uninfluenced by or accountable to workaday doctors.' And the arbitrary way it instituted disciplinary proceedings led 'some doctors — not all of them paranoid — to wonder whether the decision to prosecute is sometimes less arbitrary than selective … more indulgent to patricians than to proles.' O'Donnell suggested doctors should not pay the new fee until the GMC was reformed. The campaign for reform was taken up by the Junior Hospital Doctors Association (JHDA) a breakaway group from the BMA formed by hospital doctors below the rank of consultant.

A GMC election was due in 1971. The elections had usually been a formality. The BMA nominated medical politicians nearing retirement, 'old political warhorses put out to grass', and they were returned, often unopposed. In 1971 O'Donnell and two leading members of the JHDA stood as candidates and were elected. The medical newspaper Pulse commented 'If this was anyone's election, it was Michael O'Donnell's for the issues were the ones to which he first drew attention in World Medicine and continued to press with a relentlessness which drew strictures in Presidential addresses.'

The 'rebels' continued, from within the council, to campaign for a government enquiry into the GMC's activities but were always voted down. The BMA tried unsuccessfully to negotiate compromise solutions. Doctors in hospitals around the country held protest meetings at which the GMC foolishly declined to be represented and BBC Television's Panorama devoted an edition to exploring the dispute. The Daily Telegraph ran articles supporting the dissidents and The Times published an editorial headed 'Clapping Rebel Doctors in Irons'. Un-dissuaded, the GMC voted in November 1972 to 'strike off' all doctors who withheld their ARF. It refused to reveal the number who had refused to pay — rumours suggested 8,000 to 10,000 — but, faced by the prospect of the NHS losing the services of a large number of doctors, the Secretary of State, Sir Keith Joseph set up the enquiry the 'rebels' had asked for, appointing as chairman Dr (later Sir) Alec Merrison.

The Merrison Committee reported in 1975. All parties accepted its recommendations for radical reform and, after negotiation over details, a new Medical Act went on the Statute Book in 1978. A new GMC President, Sir John (later Lord) Richardson set about implementing the reforms. The council became 'more democratic and a good deal less straight-laced … rather more concerned with shortcomings which prejudice good patient care and rather less with private sexual relations, and allegations of self-advertisement … more argument in the chamber and less unquestioning acceptance of the dicta of committee chairman and the secretariat'

O'Donnell felt the impetus for change came to a halt when Richardson retired. In 1989 he told an interviewer that, though the GMC had changed for the better, many of the changes were cosmetic. It remained a stuffy body, reactive rather than proactive. He also thought the council was far too large. The universities and medical schools refused to amalgamate their membership and, to protect the Merrison principle of an elected majority, the council had to add another elected member to match each new academic appointment. By 1989 the number of members had reached 102.

He was also depressed by 'the habit of some senior GMC members to work to an agenda significantly different from that allegedly being discussed' and described how '… when I was appointed to a working party set up ostensibly to recommend change, it soon became clear that certain members were so determined to prevent us recommending anything useful that, like caricature bureaucrats, we spent all of our first meeting (out of eight), and most of our second, debating what our title should be. And when we eventually produced our sadly emasculated recommendations, the GMC's reaction - I kid you not - was to set up yet another working group'. The petty politicking and the oversized council, he claimed, meant an inevitable ceding of power to a burgeoning bureaucracy.

Though disenchanted, O'Donnell stayed on the council until 1996, coming top of the poll in every election. Three years later he told a meeting of medical writers why he hadn't resigned. "I was in a unique position because I was outside the medical career structure and uninterested in preferment. I didn't have to maintain diplomatic silences or say things I didn't believe in order to get a job, to defend the interests of an institution to which I belonged, or to be gifted one of the prize carrots available on the medical patronage network. I was, in short, the only member of the council free to call things as I saw them." He has often expressed his belief that "the only safe place for Authority in a free society is on the defensive" and that one of his jobs as a writer "is to keep it there".

Although for his last two years he was Chairman of the Standards Committee, he later described his role on the GMC as 'Rebel in Residence'.

== Healthwatch ==
O'Donnell had always been concerned that the worried sick, as well as the worried well, were vulnerable to false claims and even quackery. He describe faith as "a valuable ally in achieving a 'cure' and a dangerous enemy in assessing it". In the 1980s, together with the broadcaster Nick Ross, he helped inspire a Campaign Against Health Fraud, which in 1989 became known as Healthwatch, a charity which campaigns for evidence-based healthcare. He remained joint president until his death.

== Lucy in the Sky with Diamonds ==
His daughter Lucy O'Donnell was a childhood friend of Julian Lennon and Julian's drawing of her inspired John Lennon's song "Lucy in the Sky with Diamonds". After her death from lupus in September 2009, Julian recorded a new song "Lucy". Proceeds from the sales helped endow a Research Award named after her which he set up in partnership with the Lupus Foundation of America. Proceeds from sales of the song also go to the St Thomas' Lupus Trust in London.

== Awards ==
In 1995, in recognition of his achievements in medical journalism, O'Donnell was elected an honorary member of the American Alpha Omega Alpha Honor Medical Society but in 1997 declined the offer of an OBE 'for services to medicine and to journalism'.

He had often criticised what he thought was the pernicious influence of the honours system on medicine. In his Sceptic's Medical Dictionary he defines Knight Starvation as an 'Affective disorder that afflicts senior doctors in their early to mid-50s. A progressive condition that deteriorates with the publication of each Honours List and, in longstanding cases, can produce serious erosion of judgement and integrity'.

And in 1993 he described how "Some years ago, I wrote in the BMJ of an unnamed doctor whom I'd much admired until he achieved the knighthood he'd so coveted "with an act that denied the very qualities for which he'd won my respect". The editor and I received pained complaints from three people who assumed I was writing about them. I had, in fact, been writing about someone else. I still wonder what those three had been up to.'

In 2007 the Medical Journalists' Association (UK) honoured him with its first ever Lifetime Achievement Award.

== Select bibliography ==
- The Devil's Prison (Gollancz 1982)
- Doctor! Doctor! An Insider's Guide to the Games Doctors Play (Gollancz 1986)
- The Long Walk Home (Gollancz 1988)
- How to Succeed in Business Without Sacrificing Your Health (Gollancz 1988)
- A Sceptic's Medical Dictionary (BMJ Publishing Group 1997)
- Medicine's Strangest Cases (Robson Books 2002)
- Madness and Creativity in Literature and Culture: Doctors as Performance Artists (Palgrave Macmillan 2005)
- Dr Donovan's Bequest: Tales from the Slagthorpe Archive (Matador 2006)
- The Barefaced Doctor (Matador 2013)
- Medicine's Strangest Cases - updated edition (Portico Books 2016)
