= Account manager =

Person responsible for a customer account

An account manager (AM) is a person who works for a company and is responsible for the management of sales and relationships with particular customers. An account manager maintains the company's existing relationships with a client or group of clients, so that they will continue using the company for business. Account managers do not manage the daily running of the account. They manage the relationship with the client of the account(s) they are assigned to. Generally, a client will remain with one account manager throughout the account's duration. Account managers serve as the interface between customer service and the sales team in a company. They are assigned a company's existing client accounts. The purpose of being assigned particular clients is to create long term client relationships. The account manager serves to understand the customer's demands, plan how to meet these demands, and generate sales for the company as a result.

Key accounts provide the most business because they contain a small number of clients which contribute a large portion of the company's sales. According to research, sales from a company's key accounts have increased from 23% in 1975 to 60% currently.

== Responsibilities ==
The responsibilities of account managers can vary depending on the industry they work in, size of the company and nature of the business. Each customer account can vary in demands and an account manager may work with brand managers for one account and a media department for another. Account managers usually report directly to the account director or agency director of the activity and status of accounts and transactions. An account manager may also manage a single account or a variety of accounts depending on the requirement of the company. Although the responsibility can vary between companies and between accounts, there is a shared set of common responsibilities which are as follows:

1. Generate sales for a portfolio of accounts and reach the company's sales target
2. Identify new sales opportunities within existing accounts to retain a client-account manager relationship by up-selling and cross-selling
3. Manage and solve conflicts with clients The Account Manager is expected to have specific information regarding the daily operations of the company and keep the Client updated.
4. Interact and coordinate with the sales team and other staff members in other departments working on the same account
5. Establish budgets with the client and company
6. Meet time deadlines for accounts

There are situations in which an account manager, for example in advertising firms, is responsible for more than one account and therefore looks after multiple clients. When account locations do not overlap the account manager can be placed at the divisional, district, or territory level. When a sales team has a senior sales manager, the account manager coordinates sales accounts from other departments or specialties. In this scenario, the sales team will work under the direct supervision of influencers and deciders instead of with a buyer.

- Global account managers: Manage company accounts worldwide. This typically occurs in large companies with international accounts.
- National account managers: Manage numerous accounts nationwide. This typically occurs in medium to large companies when a company has multiple locations across the country.

Global account managers and national account managers may work together in a hierarchical or matrix structure. The trend is to move responsibility for the major key accounts to the global level.

== Key account manager ==
A key account manager (KAM) is assigned to a company headquarters to oversee the account team assigned to a particular account. Key account management includes sales but also includes planning and managing the full relationship between a business and its most important customers. An account manager who works in this role will engage in a variety of tasks including project management, coordination, strategic planning, relationship management, negotiation, leadership and innovative development of opportunities, and keeping record of transactions of sale and purchase goods. The tasks may include working with product design and application, logistics, sales support, and marketing.

== Key account management models ==
The basic assumption for a key account management model is the correct classification of the key accounts. A basic model often used from 1950 to 1970 was the classification model of Webster. This model has been adapted by Milman and Wilson into a two-dimensional model and was paramount from 1970 to 1990. Bensaou has tested this model empirically by his research of carmakers in the United States and Japan and made revisions. De Blick synthesized the adaptations into the 4S-model, a key account classification model. By the late 1990s, key account management spread to most B2B (business-to-business) models.

== Work environment ==
Account managers can work for small or large companies either corporate, financial, retail, or government for instance. Any company with a specific set of clients they conduct business with, can employ an account manager. Typical employers can be:

1. Direct marketing consultancies and agencies
2. Marketing departments
3. Major commercial organizations

Account managers usually work in an office setting and can work more than 40 hours weekly. Travel is usually included in the job description. National or global account managers will very likely experience extra travel.

== Qualifications ==
Although personality and an aptitude for sales is key, a degree in business, marketing, or related field is typically required and depending on the nature of the account, a background in marketing or media studies may be preferred.

=== Associations ===
- "Strategic Account Management Association (SAMA)".
- "The Sales Management Association" (PDF). Archived from the original (PDF) on 2017-12-15.

== See also ==
- Advertising account executive
- Account planning
- Account executive
- Brand manager
