= Ian Wallace (bass-baritone) =

English operatic singer and actor (1919–2009)

Ian Wallace

Ian Bryce Wallace OBE (10 July 1919 – 12 October 2009) was an English bass-baritone opera and concert singer, actor and broadcaster of Scottish extraction.

His family intended him for a career in the law, but he was attracted to the stage. Originally an actor in non-musical plays, he was persuaded to try opera and made an immediate success. He played a range of buffo parts in operas, at Glyndebourne and internationally. Wallace maintained a simultaneous career in revue, straight theatre, and broadcasting. He appeared in pantomime and at the Royal Variety Performance. As a broadcaster, he was a long-time panellist on the BBC radio panel game My Music, and he presented a television series of introductions to operas in the 1960s, as well as appearing in light entertainment shows singing a range of songs from ballads to comedy numbers. He performed his one-man show for many years. Flanders and Swann wrote several songs for him, and their best-known novelty song, "The Hippopotamus", became indelibly associated with him.

== Life and career ==
=== Early years ===
Wallace was born in Marylebone, London, the only son of a Liberal Member of Parliament, Sir John Wallace and his wife Mary Bryce Wallace (née Temple). He was educated at Charterhouse School (1933–1938) and Trinity Hall, Cambridge (1938–1940), where he read law and joined the Cambridge Footlights. During his World War II service in the Royal Artillery, he organised and starred in troop shows. Wallace was invalided out of the Army in 1944, after he contracted spinal tuberculosis, and decided that his career lay in entertainment rather than the law.

He first appeared on the professional stage in Glasgow, in Ashley Dukes's The Man With a Load of Mischief. He made his London stage début in 1945 at Sadler's Wells in James Bridie's play The Forrigan Reel, directed by Alastair Sim. He was doubtful of his suitability for an operatic career, but in 1946 friends persuaded him to audition for the conductor Alberto Erede, who engaged him for the first season of the New London Opera Company.

=== Opera ===
Wallace made his operatic début at the Cambridge Theatre in 1946, as Schaunard in La bohème. He sang there with established operatic stars such as Mariano Stabile and Margherita Grandi. His other roles with the company were the Sacristan (Tosca), Bartolo (The Barber of Seville), Ceprano (Rigoletto) and Masetto (Don Giovanni). The critic of The Times thought Wallace overplayed the buffo element, both as the Sacristan and Bartolo, but praised his singing.

Ian Wallace as Bartolo, Glyndebourne, 1961

From 1948 to 1961, Wallace performed regularly at Glyndebourne Festival Opera, making his début as Samuele in Un ballo in maschera but soon specialising in basso buffo roles, notably Bartolo in both The Marriage of Figaro and The Barber of Seville. By the early 1950s his comic skills were attracting unreserved praise. He added the buffo role of Melitone in La forza del destino to his repertoire, but he also played more serious roles including Mephistopheles in Gounod's Faust.

He made his Italian operatic début as Masetto in Parma in 1950. Later, he sang Don Magnifico in La Cenerentola in Rome in 1955 and Bartolo in Barber in Venice in 1956. He again sang Don Magnifico, this time in English, for Sadler's Wells Opera in 1960. In 1961, The Times wrote of his Bartolo, "as magnificent a character study as ever, excellently sung and never for a moment over-played." He performed at the Bregenz Festivals in 1964 and 1965. From 1965 onwards he appeared regularly with Scottish Opera, for whom his roles included Leporello in Don Giovanni, Pistol in Falstaff to the Falstaff of Geraint Evans, and the Duke of Plaza Toro in The Gondoliers. Again in Scotland, he appeared at Ledlanet Nights in his one-man shows and other performances including Colas in Mozart's early singspiel Bastien und Bastienne; Schlendrian in Bach's Coffee Cantata; and Mr Somers in Gentleman's Island by Joseph Horovitz. Also in the 1960s, he sang the main Donizetti buffo roles, Don Pasquale (Welsh National Opera, 1967) and Dulcamara in L'elisir d'amore (Glyndebourne Touring Opera, 1968). A late addition to his repertoire was Polyphemus in Handel's Acis and Galatea in 1977.

Though not a fluent sight-reader of unfamiliar music, Wallace took on out-of-the way operatic roles including Konchak in Prince Igor, Wagner in Busoni's Doktor Faust, the title role in Weber's Peter Schmoll, the buffo lead, Buonafede, in Haydn's Il mondo della luna, and Calender in Gluck's comédie mêlée d'ariettes, La rencontre imprévue.

=== Plays, revue and other stage shows ===
Early in his Glyndebourne career, Wallace consulted the festival's administrator Moran Caplat on whether he might sing in non-operatic productions elsewhere. Caplat gave him his blessing as long as he did not damage his voice. In opera Wallace was generally cast in comic roles, and he used his comedic skills when he began to appear in revue. In 1953, as well as singing in opera in Britain and internationally, he was in the Royal Variety Performance at the London Palladium and in pantomime as one of the Ugly Sisters in Cinderella. In 1962, invited to present a one-man show at the Criterion Theatre, London, he preferred to share the bill, and his "after-dinner entertainment" 4 to the Bar had a cast of four. During the run of the show Noël Coward came backstage and said to him, "You have a very good command of your audience. Mind you, anyone who has the hardihood to allow the curtain to rise on them at the Criterion Theatre, sitting in a wing chair with a glass of brandy in one hand and a cigar in the other, has bloody well got to have command of his audience".

From the early 1960s to the 1980s, Wallace performed a one-man show, featuring operatic excerpts, ballads and comic songs. He was particularly noted for his performances of the music of Flanders and Swann, and "The Hippopotamus" became his signature tune. Its refrain ("Mud, mud, glorious mud,/Nothing quite like it for cooling the blood") suggested the titles for both of his volumes of memoirs. In his Who's Who profile, under "hobbies", he wrote "singing a song about a hippopotamus to children of all ages." He also sang Flanders and Swann's songs about a rhinoceros, an elephant, a warthog, a gondolier and an income tax collector. His association with them led to his participation in the Hoffnung Music Festivals, in which he performed Variations on a Bedtime Theme, a series of spoof advertisements for a well-known bedtime drink, in the style of Bach, Mozart, Verdi, Stravinsky and Schoenberg, and The Barber of Darmstadt, a send-up of atonal composers. He also contributed to Ledlanet Nights, held at the then house of his first publisher, John Calder, appearing there in his one-man show and in comic roles in musical works.

In the theatre, Wallace's roles included Bottom in A Midsummer Night's Dream, of which The Times wrote, "he takes the stage like one inspired, and the result can seldom have been funnier". Other acting roles included César in a West End musical version of Marcel Pagnol's Fanny with Robert Morley, the Emperor of China in Cole Porter's Aladdin, Toad in Toad of Toad Hall, and Ralph in The One O'Clock World in 1984.

=== Broadcasting, film and television ===
Wallace was one of the performers who popularised classical music on television in the 1960s. He is remembered for his performance of the "Gendarmes' Duet" from Offenbach's Geneviève de Brabant, presented in full gendarme's uniform, which he repeated many times over a 10-year period with a number of accompanying tenors and pianists. He broadcast in Gilbert and Sullivan operas at the Proms and, for commercial television, devised and presented Singing for Your Supper, three series of half-hour introductions to operas, including The Barber of Seville and Don Giovanni.

He acted occasionally on television and in films, one example being the 1958 film of Tom Thumb, playing the role of the Cobbler. His other film credits included roles in Dentist in the Chair (1960) and Plenty (1985), starring Meryl Streep. A later character role in a television drama was the Praelector, spouting Latin and bemusing Ian Richardson as the new head of a Cambridge college, in the 1987 dramatisation of Tom Sharpe's Porterhouse Blue. The same year, he played Robert Forsyth on the Scottish soap opera Take the High Road.

To the general public, Wallace was best known as a panellist throughout the 27-year run of the BBC radio panel game My Music, from 1967 to 1994, not missing a single episode of more than 520 that were broadcast. John Amis, who appeared opposite Wallace in the series, remembered, "There were many pleasurable things about being in My Music.... One was that I was actually paid every week to listen to Ian's singing: ballads, folksongs, straight songs and opera, he sang them all so that you could savour the words, and the actual sound was thrilling, a high bass-baritone with a marvellous, sonorous top F, a sound that went to the heart." Occasionally Wallace would choose a rumbustious comic song, some of which he also included in his LP recordings, including "The One Eyed Riley", "I Can't Do My Bally Bottom Button Up", "Never Do It at the Station", and the sewerman's song, "Down Below".

=== Later years ===
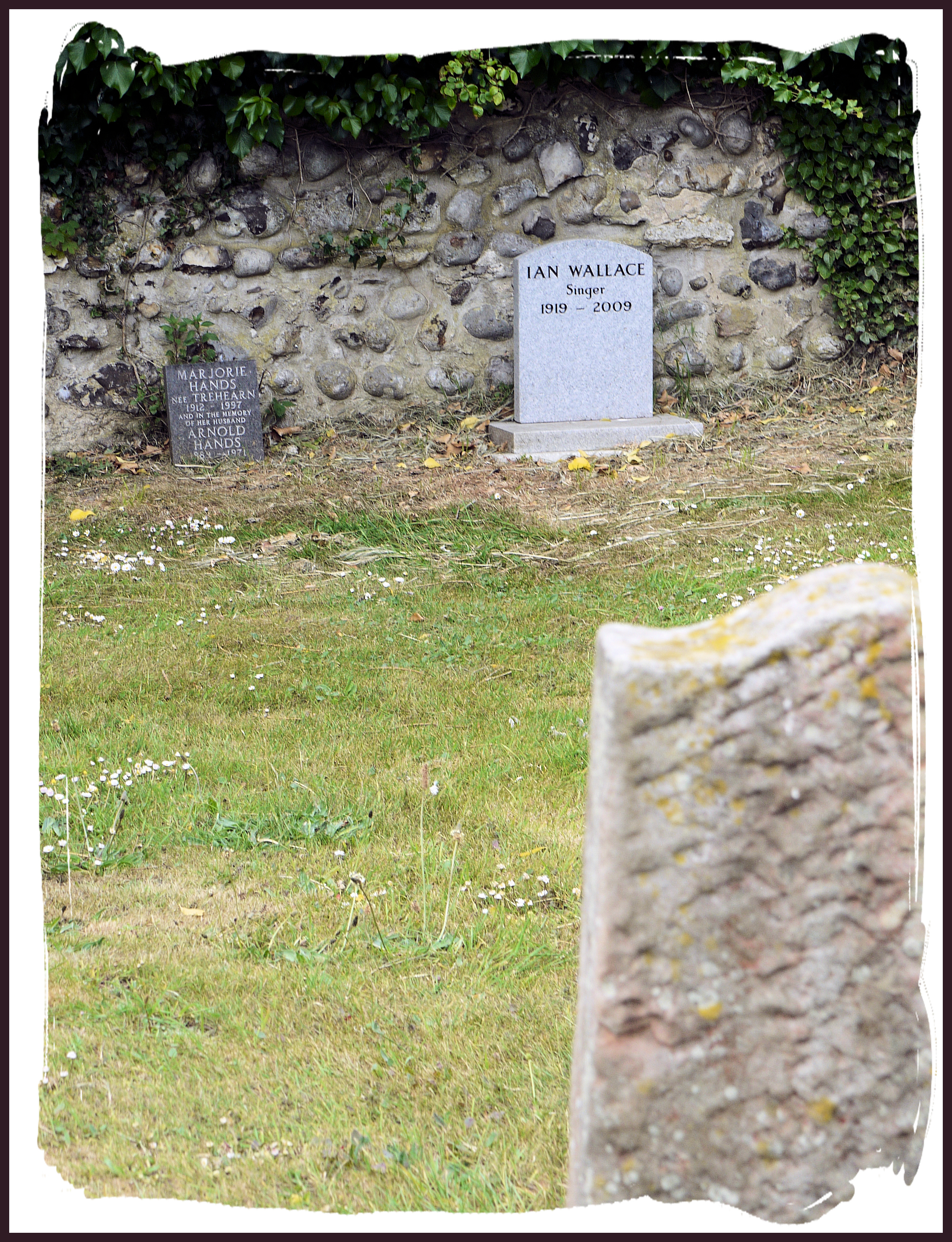
Wallace's headstone

After retiring from opera, as President of the Incorporated Society of Musicians, Wallace was prominent in the fight to stop the BBC from making drastic cuts in its orchestras in 1980. He served as President of the Council for Music in Hospitals from 1987 to 1999. He also published two volumes of reminiscences: Promise Me You'll Sing Mud (1975) and Nothing Quite Like It (1982), and a third book, Reflections on Scotland (1988).

On 26 June 2009, Wallace and Denis Norden were interviewed for BBC Radio 4's obituary programme Last Word, providing reminiscences of their My Music colleague Steve Race, who had died earlier that week.

Wallace died from bronchopneumonia and Parkinson’s disease at the age of 90 at his home in Highgate, North London, survived by his wife Patricia, daughter Rosemary and son John.

== Recordings ==
Wallace recorded the role of Doctor Bartolo in both The Marriage of Figaro and The Barber of Seville, with Glyndebourne Festival Opera forces, conducted by Vittorio Gui. His other Glyndebourne recordings included Ser Matteo del Sarto in Busoni's Arlecchino, conducted by John Pritchard, Don Magnifico in Rossini's La Cenerentola, and the Governor in Rossini's Le comte Ory, both conducted by Gui. His other operatic recordings included Altomaro in Handel's Sosarme, and Lockit in The Beggar's Opera, conducted by Sir Malcolm Sargent.

Wallace made several recordings of Gilbert and Sullivan roles. For Sargent's EMI series he recorded Pooh-Bah in The Mikado (1957) and Mountararat in Iolanthe (1959). He recorded excerpts from H.M.S. Pinafore, The Pirates of Penzance, The Mikado and The Gondoliers for an LP issued as "A Gilbert and Sullivan Spectacular", in 1974. He made two further recordings of the role of Pooh-Bah, for BBC Radio in 1966 and BBC television in 1973, but these recordings have never been released commercially.

With Donald Swann he recorded Swann's settings of John Betjeman poems in 1964. He took part in two recordings of Alice in Wonderland, in 1958 as the Mock Turtle, and in 1966 as the Caterpillar, in a set narrated by Dirk Bogarde. Discs of his programmes of varied music included An Evening's Entertainment with Ian Wallace, recorded live at the Queen Elizabeth Hall in 1971, and From Mud to Mandalay in 1977.
