= My Word! =

British radio literary quiz show (1956–1988)

- Genre: Literary humorous panel game
- Running time: 30 mins
- Country of origin: United Kingdom
- Language: English
- Home station: BBC Home Service and BBC Radio 4
- Hosted by: John Arlott; Jack Longland; John Julius Norwich; Antonia Fraser; Michael O'Donnell
- Starring: Frank Muir; Denis Norden; Isobel Barnett; Nancy Spain; E. Arnot Robertson; Dilys Powell; Anne Scott-James; Antonia Fraser; Irene Thomas
- Created by: Tony Shryane and Edward J. Mason
- Produced by: Tony Shryane, Bobby Jaye, Pete Atkin, Neil Cargill
- Original release: 1956 – 1988
- No. of series: 38
- Opening theme: Alpine Pastures, by Vivian Ellis

My Word! was a British radio quiz panel game broadcast by the BBC on the Home Service (1956–67) and Radio 4 (1967–88). It was created by Edward J. Mason and Tony Shryane, and featured the humorous writers Frank Muir and Denis Norden, known in Britain for the series Take It From Here. The show was piloted in June 1956 on the Midland Home Service and broadcast as a series on the national Home Service network from 1 January 1957. The series also ran on BBC Television for one series from July–September 1960.

For decades the programme was also broadcast worldwide via BBC World Service and was relayed to an international audience though the BBC Transcription Services. A companion programme, My Music, ran from 1967 to 1993.

== Background and first broadcasts ==
In 1956, Edward J. Mason and Tony Shryane, respectively the writer and producer of the popular radio soap opera The Archers, decided that by way of a change they would devise and produce what Frank Muir called "a new kind of not-very-academic literary quiz". The Aeolian Hall in London was booked for the recording of a pilot show, but at the last minute two of the four panellists were unexpectedly unavailable. Shryane sought the help of Muir and his writing partner Denis Norden, scriptwriters of the popular BBC comedy series Take It From Here, who were based in a nearby office. They thought of themselves as writers rather than performers, but at Shryane's urgent request they agreed to stand in for the absentees. Muir was partnered by Isobel Barnett – a panel show regular – and Norden by the journalist Nancy Spain. Mason set the questions, and the chairman was the cricket commentator and poet John Arlott, who was billed as "umpire". The pilot was well received by the audience in the hall and by listeners to its first transmission. The BBC commissioned a series, which was transmitted in early 1957. Muir and Norden had no intention of becoming regular panellists, but Shyrane persuaded them.

Arlott did not return for the second series, which began in August 1957. He was succeeded by Jack Longland, known to BBC listeners as the chairman of the panel show Country Questions and a regular team member on Round Britain Quiz and panellist on Any Questions? Although, unlike Arlott, Longland had no particular association with cricket he too was billed as umpire until 1962, after which he was billed as "in the chair", as were his successors.

== Later series ==
The programme ran for 38 series, until 1988. Muir and Norden were in every series, always on opposing teams. As Muir's partner, Barnett was succeeded during the first series by the novelist and critic E. Arnot Robertson. On Robertson's death in 1961 the film critic and Greek scholar Dilys Powell took her place until the show finished, when she was aged 87. Norden's first partner was Nancy Spain; after her death in 1964 she was succeeded by the journalist Anne Scott-James, and then from 1979 by the historian Antonia Fraser. In the one season in which Fraser took the chair her place as Norden's teammate was taken by Irene Thomas.

After 20 years in the chair, Longland retired from the programme at the end of the 1977 series. He was succeeded by John Julius Norwich for four series, followed by Fraser for a single series and finally Michael O'Donnell for the last five series, from late 1983 to 1988.

From time to time guests substituted for absent regulars. Neither Spain nor Powell ever missed a broadcast during their time as panellists, but Robertson and Scott-James missed one apiece, their absences covered respectively by Pamela Frankau and Katherine Whitehorn. Lionel Hale (one of the intended contestants in the pilot show) deputised for both Muir and Norden in 1967 as did John Wells in 1975 and Barry Took on four occasions between 1978 and 1982. Ted Kavanagh took Muir's place for two programmes in 1957, and Edward Blishen stood in for Norden in two episodes in 1985. Fraser's absences between 1986 and 1988 were covered by Joan Bakewell, Victoria Glendinning, P. D. James, Libby Purves and Gay Search.

After Mason's death in 1971 Longland took over responsibility for compiling the questions, and was joined in that role by Peter Moore in 1972. After Longland's retirement Moore continued to set the questions until 1987. For the final season, in 1988, O'Donnell combined the roles of chairman and question-setter.

== Content ==
The two teams faced questions devised, for the first 21 series, by Mason, of whom Muir wrote:

One thing which Denis and I learned, and appreciated, during those early years of My Word! was how much the success of the show depended on the inconspicuous skill of the man who compiled it, Edward J. Mason. He had a gift for the common touch which is rare in areas like literary quizzes. He worked within the general awareness of listeners who had been to school; most of his poetic questions were to do with poems in Palgrave's Golden Treasury, most quotations were semi-familiar and in most books of quotations. We reckoned that 80 per cent of listeners felt that, given a bit of time for thought, they could answer almost 80 per cent of the questions.

Mason and his successors provided word games and literary quizzes covering vocabulary, etymology, snippets of poetry, and the like. In many series the opening round consisted of obscure words for the panellists to define: examples ranged from such words as auscultation, bumblepuppy, cabless and crinkum-crankum to defenestration, hebetude, hobbledehoy and katydid to lallation, macaronic, palmiped and rahat lokum, or scrimshaw, tatterdemalion, unau and widdershins. (Note: auscultation: listening, with ear or stethoscope, to the sound of the movement of heart, lungs, or other organs; bumblepuppy: a game played with bats or rackets in which two players strike a ball attached to a post by a string in opposite directions; cabless: unable to get a taxi; crinkum-crankum: full of twists and turns; defenestration: being thrown from a window; hebetude: dullness; hobbledehoy: a clumsy or awkward youth; katydid: an American grasshopper; lallation: a speech impediment in which the letter "r" is sounded as "l"; macaronic: describing a burlesque form of verse in which vernacular words are mixed with those of another language; palmiped: web-footed; rahat lokum: Turkish delight; scrimshaw: ivory or bone, decorated with engraved designs; tatterdemalion: a ragamuffin; unau: the South American two-toed sloth; widdershins: anticlockwise. (OED))

In the final round, each team was asked to give the origin of a famous phrase or quotation. In early shows, once the real answers were given, Muir and Norden were invited to explain the origin of the phrase less seriously, in the form of a feghoot. An early example was the quotation "Dead! And never called me mother!" from a stage adaptation of East Lynne, which became the exclamation of a youth coming out of a public telephone box which he had discovered to be out of order. Later the first part of the round was dropped in favour of having the chairman simply announce the accepted origin of each phrase, thus opening up new fields of phrases that would have been too well known or too obscure to be posed as questions. In later series Muir and Norden chose their own phrases in advance of each programme, and their stories became longer and more convoluted.

The stories became a popular segment of the quiz. Examples included Norden's tale in which a young woman and a young man found themselves happily trapped in a sauna despite earlier assurances from the landlord that the faulty lock had been repaired: "Least said, soonest mended" became "Lease said sauna's mended". In another, "There's many a slip 'twixt the cup and the lip" became a story about Édouard Manet in a drunken doze in a beauty spot between a carp pond and Lover's Leap – "There's Manet asleep 'twixt the carp and the leap". In another, Muir confessed to forging fan letters purportedly from Monica Dickens, Val Gielgud, Asa Briggs and Fay Compton, so that "I am monarch of all I survey" became "I am Monica, Val, Asa, Fay". A Norden story explaining "Charity shall cover the multitude of sins" became a lament for his diminishing capacity for alcohol and consequent need to enunciate extremely carefully after drinking spirits: "Clarity shall cover the multitude of gins".

== Series history ==
A one-off pilot programme was broadcast by the Midland region of the BBC Home Service on 6 June 1956. When the series was launched on the national BBC network in January 1957, an edited edition of the pilot preceded the 14 new episodes.

Series	Dates	Episodes	Host	Regular panel	Notes/guests
1	1 Jan–21 May 1957	Pilot show + 14	John Arlott	Isobel Barnett (pilot and episodes 2, 3 and 4), E. Arnot Robertson (episodes 1 and 5–14), Frank Muir, Denis Norden, Nancy Spain	Pamela Frankau; Ted Kavanagh (Note: Pamela Frankau deputised for Arnot Robertson in the 7 May episode; Ted Kavanagh stood in for Denis Norden on 7 and 14 May.)
2	5 Aug–25 Oct 1957	10	Jack Longland	Muir, Norden, Robertson, Spain	
3	30 Apr–26 Aug 1958	13	Longland	Muir, Norden, Robertson, Spain	
Christmas special	25 Dec 1958	1	Longland	Muir, Norden, Robertson, Spain	
4	6 May 1959–15 Jul 1959	11	Longland	Muir, Norden, Robertson, Spain	
5	22 Dec 1959–22 Mar 1960	13	Longland	Muir, Norden, Robertson, Spain	
6	22 Sep–16 Dec 1960	13	Longland	Muir, Norden, Robertson, Spain	
7	4 Jun–30 Jul 1961	9	Longland	Muir, Norden, Robertson, Spain	
8	17 Sep 1961–5 Nov 1961	8	Longland	Muir, Norden, Robertson, (Note: Arnot Robertson died on 21 September, after the recording of this series. The later episodes were broadcast posthumously.) Spain	
Christmas special	25 Dec 1961	1	Longland	Muir, Norden, Dilys Powell, Spain	
9	1 Jul–30 Sep 1962	13	Longland	Muir, Norden, Powell, Spain	
10	2 Apr–25 Jun 1963	13	Longland	Muir, Norden, Powell, Spain	
11	26 Nov 1963–25 Feb 1964	14	Longland	Muir, Norden, Powell, Spain	
"My Bard"	24 April 1964	1	Longland	Muir, Norden, Powell, Spain	Shakespeare quatercentenary special
12	1 May–12 Jun 1964	7	Longland	Muir, Norden, Powell, Anne Scott-James, Spain (Note: Nancy Spain died in an air crash on 21 March 1964, and the two episodes she had recorded shortly before were broadcast posthumously as the first two of series 12. The Shakespeare special had been recorded in 1963.)	
13	30 Oct–18 Dec 1964	8	Longland	Muir, Norden, Powell, Scott-James	
14	11 May–27 Jul 1965	12	Longland	Muir, Norden, Powell, Scott-James	
15	9 Nov 1965–16 Feb 1966	15	Longland	Muir, Norden, Powell, Scott-James	
16	6 Sep–27 Dec 1966	16	Longland	Muir, Norden, Powell, Scott-James	
17	4 Apr– 18 Jul 1967	15	Longland	Muir, Norden, Powell, Scott-James	Lionel Hale (Note: Lionel Hale stood in for Norden, 2 and 23 May and for Frank Muir, 9 May.)
18	17 Jan–15 Apr 1968	15	Longland	Muir, Norden, Powell, Scott-James	
19	11 Nov 1968–13 Jan 1969	10	Longland	Muir, Norden, Powell, Scott-James	
20	28 Sep–21 Dec 1969	13	Longland	Muir, Norden, Powell, Scott-James	
Dickens edition	26 Sep 1970	1	Longland	Muir, Norden, Powell, Scott-James	
21	15 Oct–31 Dec 1970	13	Longland	Muir, Norden, Powell, Scott-James	John Wells (Note: Deputising for Norden, 29 October and 5 November.)
22	27 Sep–27 Dec 1971	14	Longland	Muir, Norden, Powell, Scott-James	
23	1 Oct–24 Dec 1972	13	Longland	Muir, Norden, Powell, Scott-James	
24	2 Oct–25 Dec 1973		Longland	Muir, Norden, Powell, Scott-James	
25	1 Oct–23 Nov 1974	13	Longland	Muir, Norden, Powell, Scott-James	
26	30 Sep–30 Dec 1975	14	Longland	Muir, Norden, Powell, Scott-James	Wells (Note: Standing in for Muir, 18 October and for Norden, 30 December.); Katherine Whitehorn (Note: Standing in for Anne Scott-James, 25 October 1975.)
27	5 Oct–28 Dec 1976	13	Longland	Muir, Norden, Powell, Scott-James	
28	5 Oct–28 Dec 1977	13	Longland	Muir, Norden, Powell, Scott-James	
29	27 Sep–20 Dec 1978	13	John Julius Norwich	Muir, Norden, Powell, Scott-James	Barry Took (Note: Substituting for Muir.)
30	26 Sep–19 Dec 1979	13	Norwich	Antonia Fraser, Muir, Norden, Powell	Took
31	28 Sep–21 Dec 1980	13	Norwich	Fraser, Muir, Norden, Powell	Took (Note: Substituting for Norden.)
32	30 Dec 1981–24 Mar 1982	13	Norwich	Fraser, Muir, Norden, Powell	Took
33	8 Dec 1982–2 Mar 1983	13	Fraser	Muir, Norden, Powell, Irene Thomas	
34	22 Nov 1983–31 Jan 1984	13	Michael O'Donnell	Fraser, Muir, Norden, Powell	
35	4 Dec 1984–5 Mar 1985	13	O'Donnell	Fraser, Muir, Norden, Powell	Edward Blishen (Note: Standing in for Norden in two episodes in February 1985. A recording of one of these episodes survives.)
36	31 Dec 1985–25 Mar 1986	13	O'Donnell	Fraser, Muir, Norden, Powell	Libby Purves, Gay Search; Joan Bakewell, P. D. James and Victoria Glendinning (Note: Successively deputising for Antonia Fraser, one episode apiece.)
37	17 Jun–4 Aug 1987	8	O'Donnell	Fraser, Muir, Norden, Powell	
38	8 Aug–26 Sep 1988	8	O'Donnell	Fraser, Muir, Norden, Powell	Search and Glendinning (Note: Standing in for Fraser on 15 and 22 August 1988 respectively.)

Source: BBC Genome and Global British Comedy Collaborative.

== Syndication and spin-offs ==
Over the years My Word! was syndicated through the BBC Transcription Services in more than 35 countries including not only Anglophone locations such as Australia and the US, but in countries including Chile, Germany and Russia. A televised version of the programme ran in Britain for a series of ten episodes on BBC Television from 10 July to 11 September 1960. The team and host were the same as for the radio series of that year; the producer was Barrie Edgar. A companion radio programme, My Music, ran from 1967 to 1993. When it was mooted, Muir and Norden told Shryane that they were too busy to take on another series, but they allowed themselves to be persuaded and became permanent features on the programme. In 1972 and 1973 the two shows joined forces to present Christmas specials, My Word! It's My Music, with Longland and Steve Race as co-hosts and the regular My Word team joined by Ian Wallace and David Franklin (1972), and Wallace and John Amis (1973).

Between 1974 and 1989, Muir and Norden published five collections of their My Word! stories, and in 1991 an omnibus edition of the five volumes was issued:

- You Can't Have Your Kayak and Heat It. Eyre Methuen. 1973. ISBN 978-0-41-330660-9.
- Upon My Word!. London: Eyre Methuen. 1974. ISBN 978-0-41-332660-7.
- Take My Word for It. London: Eyre Methuen. 1978. ISBN 978-0-41-706230-3.
- Oh, My Word!. London: Eyre Methuen. 1980. ISBN 978-0-41-347510-7.
- You Have My Word. London: Methuen. 1989. ISBN 978-0-41-361810-8.
- The Utterly Ultimate 'My Word!' Collection. London: Mandarin Paperbacks. 1991. ISBN 978-0-74-930824-7., a collection of all five volumes.

== Notes, references and sources ==
=== Sources ===
- Lamb, Andrew (2006). British Light Music Classics. London: Hyperion Records. OCLC 294847217.
- Muir, Frank (1998). A Kentish Lad: The Autobiography of Frank Muir. London: Corgi. ISBN 978-0-55-214137-6.
- Muir, Frank; Denis Norden (1991). The Utterly Ultimate 'My Word!' Collection. London: Mandarin Paperbacks. ISBN 978-0-74-930824-7.
