= E. Arnot Robertson =

English novelist and broadcaster (1903–1961)

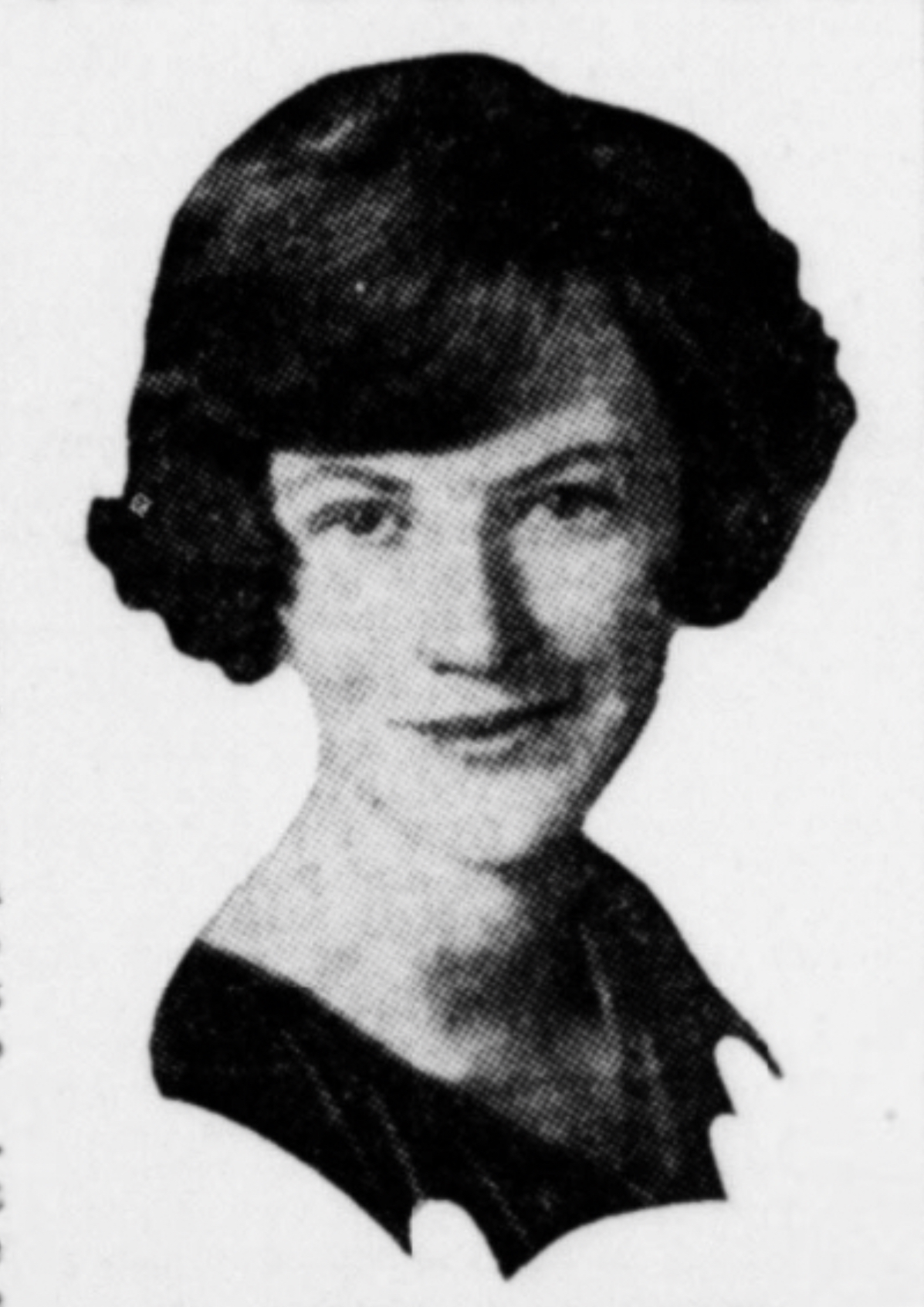
- Robertson in the Daily Express (1930)
- Born: Eileen Arbuthnot Robertson; 10 January 1903; Moor Lodge, South Holmwood, Surrey
- Died: 21 September 1961 (aged 58); Hampstead, London
- Spouse: Henry E Turner (m. 1927)
- Children: 1

Eileen Arbuthnot Robertson (10 January 1903 – 21 September 1961) was an English novelist, critic and broadcaster. Her 1931 novel Four Frightened People gave rise to a film of the same name in 1934.

== Family ==
Robertson was the daughter of Dr George Arbuthnot Robertson (1860–1942), physician and surgeon, and his wife Elsie Margaret (née Brune). She was baptised on 18 March 1903 at St Mary's Church, Holmwood. Her one sister, Mary Arbuthnot, was born in 1899. Robertson was educated at Sherborne School for Girls, which she strongly disliked. The family moved to London in 1917. She later described the atmosphere in the family as "stultifying". She continued her education for two years in France and Switzerland.

Robertson took her first job, on the London-based magazine Answers, at the age of 19. In that year she also sat anonymously for the painting A Red Haired Girl by James McBey. On 26 February 1927 she was married in Kensington to H. E. (from 1951 Sir Henry) Turner (1891–1961), secretary-general of the Empire Press Union, later the Commonwealth Press Union. They adopted a son, Gordon Turner, in the late 1930s. The Turners moved to Heath Street, Hampstead, in 1946. They were passionate sailors, as the sailing background of Ordinary Families shows. Turner's death in a boating accident precipitated Robertson's suicide five months later.

== Writing ==
By her mid-twenties E. Arnot Robertson, as she chose to be called in print, was on her way to becoming a popular "middlebrow" novelist with a large following, especially for her first five novels.

Four Frightened People (1931), set in a Malaya that she never actually visited, became Volume 15 on the Penguin list in 1935. A film, directed by Cecil B. DeMille, was released in 1934. Equally celebrated was Ordinary Families (1933), the story of a young girl growing up with her family in Pin Mill, Suffolk. Both titles were repeatedly reprinted into the 1980s in the Virago paperback series, as was her first novel, Cullum, in 1989.

However, her later novels added little to the reputation the earlier ones had given her, although she had "seemed at one time likely to develop into a novelist of considerable comic substance and power."

Robertson also wrote astringent film criticism. Reviewing the young Bette Davis in Dangerous for the Picture Post in 1935, she said, "I think Bette Davis would probably have been burned as a witch if she had lived two or three hundred years ago. She gives the curious feeling of being charged with power which can find no ordinary outlet." She was involved in 1946 in protracted litigation with MGM over what the corporation perceived as unfairly negative reviews of their films. This contributed to her losing a job at the BBC, but her eventual legal costs of £8,000 were paid from the proceeds of a fundraising appeal made by the Critics' Circle.

Robertson was a contestant on the BBC panel game My Word! from 1957 to 1961, partnering Frank Muir.

== Bibliography ==
- Cullum (1928) ISBN 0-86068-598-5
- Three Came Unarmed (1929) ISBN 0-09-309620-8
- Four Frightened People (1931) ISBN 0-86068-280-3
- Ordinary Families (1933) ISBN 0-86068-281-1
- Thames Portrait (1937)
- Summer's Lease (1940)
- Mr. Cobbett and the Indians (1942)
- The Signpost (1943)
- Devices and Desires (1954)
- Justice of the Heart (1958)
- The Spanish Town Papers (edited, 1959)
- The Strangers on My Roof (1964)
