= Humphreys (Unigate) =

Fictional characters in UK TV milk advertisements

The British milk company Unigate produced a series of TV advertisements in the 1970s featuring characters called the Humphreys. The Humphreys were milk thieves whose only visible presence was a red-and-white striped straw with which to suck up the milk. TV personalities of the time, including Barbara Windsor, Arthur Mullard, Rod Hull, Sid James and Spike Milligan, featured in the adverts; but the campaign is best known for the slogan: "Watch out, watch out—there's a Humphrey about!" written and sung by Mike Batt.

A merchandising campaign accompanied the adverts; and the Humphrey-themed mugs, milk bottles, and straws are now collector's items. The campaign was devised by John Webster of the Boase Massimi Pollitt advertising agency.

== Celebrities featuring in the Humphrey ads ==
- Muhammad Ali
- Benny Hill
- Rod Hull
- Sid James
- Henry McGee
- Spike Milligan
- Frank Muir
- Arthur Mullard
- Barbara Windsor

Several campaign stickers were produced, including:

- "Watch Out, Watch Out, There's a Humphrey About", featuring two red-and-white striped straws projecting from a pocket
- "Watch Out for the Humphrey Patrol", featuring a row of the tops of thirteen red and white striped straws
- "Drink it Quick, Humphreys are Slick", featuring a red-and-white striped straw projecting from a partially drunk glass of milk.
- "Get more milk, they're on the attack. Watch out 'cos the Humphreys are back" was a later incarnation.

Three different full sticker sheets can be seen online.
