= My Music (radio programme) =

British radio and TV panel game (1967–2011)

- Genre: Musical humorous panel game
- Running time: 30 mins
- Country of origin: United Kingdom
- Language: English
- Home station: BBC Home Service and BBC Radio 4
- TV adaptations: BBC2 (1977–1983)
- Hosted by: Steve Race
- Starring: Frank Muir; David Franklin (1967–73); John Amis (1974–94); Denis Norden; Ian Wallace
- Created by: Tony Shryane and Edward J. Mason
- Produced by: Tony Shryane, Bobby Jaye, Pete Atkin, Richard Edis
- Original release: 3 January 1967 – 24 January 1994
- No. of series: 29
- No. of episodes: 520+
- Opening theme: 1. 1967–75 Composed by Graham Dalley; 2. 1976–82 Composed by Graham Dalley; arranged by ?; 3. 1983–94 Composed by Graham Dalley; arranged by ?

My Music is a British radio panel show which premiered on the BBC Home Service on 3 January 1967. It was a companion programme to My Word!, and like that show featured comic writers Denis Norden and Frank Muir. The show was last recorded in November 1993 and broadcast in January 1994, then rebroadcast until 2011. It was also broadcast via the BBC World Service. There was also a television version on BBC2 which ran for seven series between 1977 and 1983.

== Description ==
My Music followed My Word!'s pattern of two teams of two competing in a series of challenges, based this time on music rather than words. Again, the quiz element was subordinate to the entertainment. In later years, each episode featured a final round in which each contestant was required to sing a song, regardless of his vocal ability. Initially, this was a genuine test of whether the contestants knew the songs, but later the songs were always ones that they were certain to know. Indeed, towards the end Denis Norden decided what song he would sing, supplying some rather bizarre ones. Many of these were written by the English music hall songwriters R. P. Weston and Bert Lee.

The teams were:

- 1967–1973: Ian Wallace and Denis Norden versus David Franklin and Frank Muir
- 1973: Ian Wallace and Denis Norden versus Owen Brannigan and Frank Muir
- 1974–1994: Ian Wallace and Denis Norden versus John Amis and Frank Muir (these four participants also contested the TV version)

The show was hosted for its entire run by composer Steve Race, who also set the challenges (after an early period in which they were set by show creator Edward J. Mason) and provided piano accompaniment where appropriate (except in the first five series, in which accompaniment was provided by Graham Dalley on mellotron). Neither Race nor Wallace missed a single one of the more than 520 episodes broadcast.

Graham Dalley, the show's first accompanist, also composed the signature tune, and his original mellotron version was used from 1967 to 1975. A new arrangement of the theme, featuring trumpets, bass guitar, electric guitar, conga drums, and cabasa, was used from 1976, and was succeeded in 1983 by an arrangement for piano and harpsichord, composed by Steve Race.

Producers of the programme included Tony Shryane and Pete Atkin.

In the United States, the show was syndicated on the WFMT Fine Arts Network until 1 October 2013, when BBC ended US distribution.

== See also ==
- Face the Music (TV series) – a similarly lighthearted contest broadcast on BBC Television.
