= Ledlanet Nights =

Former arts festival in Kinross-shire, Scotland

Ledlanet Nights in Kinross-shire, Scotland, was an arts festival that operated from 1962 for around ten years. This "inventive and not at all flippant little festival" offered performances mounted on a shoestring budget, which were held in a hall at Ledlanet, then the home of the publisher John Calder.

== History ==
Ledlanet Nights, described at some length in Calder's autobiography, Pursuit, developed as a general festival from modest beginnings. Many art forms were offered, among which were opera, theatre, recitals and orchestral concerts. An early, if unexpected addition, were folk evenings. As well as art exhibitions, the mix included one- or two-person shows of different types ranging from those of Geraint Evans to Ian Wallace or Donald Swann. Initially these were mostly produced especially for Ledlanet, but as the seasons grew in ambition, later shows were often 'bought in' from a tour.

In the immediate post-war period, professional opera could be found in Scotland mainly through the offerings of touring companies. Arts activity in country houses was not unknown but festivals generally were nowhere near as widespread as they have since become. In 1963 when opera was found in Scotland largely at the Edinburgh International Festival, and when Scottish Opera had only just been founded, any additional opera on a small scale was welcomed. Handel works, then much less well known, featured prominently at Ledlanet with productions including Agrippina and Alcina. Jill Gomez and Josephine Barstow were among several singers appearing who made an impression there at a relatively early stage in their careers, in Il Re Pastore and Una cosa rara, respectively.

Ledlanet Nights remained small scale; even at its peak in 1973 there were seats for only 155 people. Performers and audience members alike remember well the intimate atmosphere. With little support from public coffers, the Festival was heavily dependent on fundraising by regular patrons and supporters. By 1973 this was no longer sustainable. Calder attributes the sudden end of Ledlanet Nights to the financial consequences of his divorce from his second wife.
