= What-a-Mess =

Children's media franchise

What-a-Mess is a series of children's books written by British comedy writer Frank Muir and illustrated by Joseph Wright. The title character is a dishevelled, accident-prone Afghan Hound puppy, whose real name is Prince Amir of Kinjan. The book series was later made into two animated series, both narrated by Muir.

== Plot ==
What-a-Mess is a scruffy Afghan puppy with messy fur. He lives with his mother Duchess and the family that raised him as What-a-Mess often gets into various misadventures and mishaps that would often annoy the patriarch of the family that owns him and some of the other animals in his neighborhood.

== Characters ==
- What-a-Mess is a scruffy Afghan puppy who is the main character of the franchise. His real name is Prince Amir of Kinjan. What-a-Mess is a clumsy and well-meaning pup who gets into different misadventures in his neighborhood and town that often annoys the patriarch of the family that owns him and some other neighborhood animals. In the US animated version, What-a-Mess is voiced by Ryan O'Donohue and he now has a collar and green orange spots in the US cartoon.
- Baldwin: In the US animated version is a blue duck who sits on What-A-Ness's head, and he is What-A-Ness's companion and friend. In the UK animated version and books, Baldwin did not have a name, nor is he noticed. He is also originally yellow, although there is a bluebird in the UK animated version and books that might be the inspiration to how Baldwin in the US animated version got his blue colour and personality.
- What-a-Mess' mother, also known as The Duchess of Kinjan, is a pedigree Afghan Hound who often looks out for her son even when he gets into some mishaps. She is voiced by Charity James and given brown fur in the US animated version.
- The family are the owners of What-a-Mess and Duchess. They consist of the father, the mother, the son, and the daughter. Like most humans in the series, they are mostly seen from the neck down with their faces slightly obscured or shown from far away. The patriarch is often shown getting annoyed with What-a-Mess' mishaps. They are voiced by Michael Bell (as the father), Miriam Flynn (as the mother), Adam Hendershott (as the son), and Debi Derryberry (as the daughter), in the US version.
- Poppet: Belonging to the father of the house's aunt, Poppet is a cute, clean, and yet troublemaking dog that What-a-Mess and his friends truly despise, making her first appearance in Super What-a-Mess.
- Archbishop of Canterbury is a scruffy dark blue dog with brown patches who What-A-Mess met and befriended in What-A-Mess Goes to the Seaside. He is named this way because when What-A-Mess introduces himself with his breed name he sarcastically replies "Wotcher, cock, I'm the Archbishop of Canterbury!", which the naive pup takes as his actual name. His name was changed to Norton in the US animated version, and he was voiced by Dana Hill. This was Hill's final voice acting role on American TV during her lifetime.
- President of the United States: In one of the US animated version episodes where What-a-Mess got lost in town, he was helped by a dog voiced by Jim Cummings that had the same experience as the Archbishop of Canterbury in the UK version and books, where when What-a-Mess introduces himself with his breed name, he sarcastically replies "Oh really? And I'm the President of the United States!" which the naive pup takes as his actual name.
- The Cat Next Door, also known as Felicia in the US animated version, is a brown Siamese cat that loves to tease What-A-Mess at times. In the US animated version, she was coloured blue and was voiced by Jo Ann Harris.
- Cynthia is a hedgehog who What-A-Mess befriended in What-A-Mess Goes to School. Her character was redesigned to become a mole named Ramona (voiced by Candi Milo) in the US animated version because Hedgehogs are not native to America.
- Ryvita: Appearing only in the books, Ryvita is a ladybird that What-A-Mess and his friends befriended, and who first appeared in What-a-Mess Goes on Television. She speaks so small that only Cynthia could understand her.
- Esmeralda is a white mouse that belonged to the girl of the house, who only appeared in both the book, What-a-Mess and the Hairy Monster, and an episode of the US version of the same name. In the US animated version, she was voiced by Russi Taylor.
- Trash: Only in the US animated version, Trash is a Bull Terrier who is a real troublemaker for What-A-Mess. His real name is Francis as revealed in "Santa What-a-Mess" and is voiced by Joe Nipote impersonating Jack Nicholson.
- Frank is an Old English Sheepdog that narrates the US animated version of What-A-Mess, voiced by Frank Muir. He often acts as the voice of reason for What-a-Mess and the other animals where he is not shown to be annoyed by What-a-Mess' mishaps.

== Book list ==
=== Large books ===
1. What-a-Mess
2. What-a-Mess The Good
3. What-a-Mess at the Seaside
4. What-a-Mess Goes to School
5. Prince What-a-Mess
6. Super What-a-Mess
7. What-a-Mess and the Cat Next Door
8. What-a-Mess Goes on Television
9. What-a-Mess and the Hairy Monster

=== Small books ===
==== Four Seasons ====
1. What-a-Mess in Spring
2. What-a-Mess in Summer
3. What-a-Mess in Autumn
4. What-a-Mess in Winter

==== Four Square Meals ====
1. What-a-Mess has Breakfast
2. What-a-Mess has Lunch
3. What-a-Mess has Tea
4. What-a-Mess has Supper

==== Mini books ====
1. What-a-Mess has a Brain Wave
2. What-a-Mess and Little Poppet
3. What-a-Mess and a trip to the Vet
4. What-a-Mess the Beautiful
5. What-a-Mess Goes to Town
6. What-a-Mess Goes Camping

== Animated series ==
What-a-Mess
- Created by: Frank Muir
- Developed by: Cliff Ruby; Elana Lesser (version 2)
- Written by: Frank Muir; Timothy Forder (version 1); Cliff Ruby; Elana Lesser (version 2)
- Directed by: Timothy Forder (version 1); Kent Butterworth (version 2); Ginny McSwain (voice director) (version 2); Marsha Goodman (voice director) (version 2)
- Voices of: Ryan O'Donohue; Jo Ann Harris; Joe Nipote; Frank Muir; Charity James; Miriam Flynn; Michael Bell; Debi Derryberry; Adam Hendershott
- Theme music composer: Andrew Lloyd Webber (version 1); Barrie Guard (version 1); Michael Tavera (version 2); Billy Martin (version 2)
- Composer: Michael Tavera (version 2)
- Countries of origin: United Kingdom (version 1); United States (version 2)
- No. of seasons: 2
- No. of episodes: 45

Production
- Executive producers: Claire Derry; David Hamilton (version 1); Andy Heyward; Robby London; Mike Maliani (version 2)
- Producers: Mary Swindale (version 1); Cliff Ruby; Elana Lesser; Kent Butterworth (version 2)
- Running time: 5 minutes (version 1); 10 minutes (version 1, later episodes); 22 minutes (version 2)
- Production companies: Smallfilms (version 1); Bevanfield Films (version 1, later episodes); DIC Productions, L.P. (version 2)

Original release
- Network: BBC (version 1); ITV (version 1, later episodes); ABC (version 2)
- Release: 24 December 1979 – 4 April 1996

An animated series was made in the UK in 1979 by Smallfilms. More episodes were made in the UK in 1990 by Central Independent Television, Link Licensing, and Bevanfield Films. A second, American version was made in 1995 by DIC Entertainment and aired on ABC in the United States. It aired on YTV from 1995 to 1999 in Canada, and aired on Spacetoon from 2004 to 2014 in the Arab world. Both versions were narrated by Muir. Both animated series aired on the Australian Broadcasting Corporation in Australia.

=== Episodes ===
==== Version 1 (Smallfilms, iTV / UK series) ====
Episode	Title	UK release date	Comment
1	"A Bee?"	24 December 1979	Adapted from What-a-Mess
2	"A Hat?"	26 December 1979	Adapted from What-a-Mess
3	"A Fish?"	27 December 1979	Adapted from What-a-Mess
4	"A Mole?"	28 December 1979	Adapted from What-a-Mess
5	"A Hound?"	30 December 1979	Adapted from What-a-Mess
6	"Good Dog"	31 December 1979	Adapted from
7	"Mighty Hunter"	1 January 1980	Adapted from What-a-Mess The Good
8	"Enough for One Day"	2 January 1980	Adapted from What-a-Mess The Good
9	"A Very Good Dog Indeed"	3 January 1980	Adapted from What-a-Mess The Good
10	"A Prince"	4 January 1980	Adapted from What-a-Mess The Good
11	"What-a-Mess at the Seaside"	26 March 1990	Adapted from What-a-Mess at the Seaside
12	"What-a-Mess Goes to School"	2 April 1990	Adapted from What-a-Mess Goes to School
13	"Prince What-a-Mess"	9 April 1990	Adapted from Prince What-a-Mess and What-a-Mess in Winter
14	"Super What-a-Mess"	16 April 1990	Adapted from Super What-a-Mess
15	"What-a-Mess Keeps Cool"	30 April 1990	Adapted from What-a-Mess in Spring and What-a-Mess in Summer
16	"What-a-Mess and Cynthia the Hedgehog"	14 May 1990	Adapted from What-a-Mess has Supper and What-a-Mess in Autumn
17	"What-a-Mess Has a Brain Wave!"	21 May 1990	Adapted from What-a-Mess has Breakfast and What-a-Mess Had a Brain Wave
18	"What-a-Mess and the Cat-Next-Door"	4 June 1990	Adapted from What-a-Mess and the Cat Next Door
19	"What-a-Mess and Little Poppet"	18 June 1990	Adapted from What-a-Mess and Little Poppet
20	"What-a-Mess Goes Camping"	2 July 1990	Adapted from What-a-Mess Goes Camping
21	"What-a-Mess The Beautiful"	9 July 1990	Adapted from What-a-Mess The Beautiful
22	"What-a-Mess Goes to Town"	16 July 1990	Adapted from What-a-Mess Goes to Town
23	"What-a-Mess and a Trip to the Vet"	23 July 1990	Adapted from What-a-Mess Goes to the Vet

==== Version 2 (DIC Productions, L.P. / US series) ====
Episode	Title
1	"Talkin' Trash/A Bone to Pick/Midnight Snack"
2	"Schoolin' Around/The Legend of Junkyard Jones/It's Raining Cats and Dogs"
3	"Home Alone...Almost/Super What-A-Mess/The Recliner"
4	"Afghan Holiday/The Bone Tree"
5	"Just Four More Left/The Ropes/What-A-Mess Has Breakfast"
6	"Prize Puppy/The Great Escape/The Scarecrow and Prince Amir"
7	"Shampooed/Show and Tail/I Spy, I Cry, I Try"
8	"What-A-Mess and the Hairy Monster/Trick Or Treat/My Teatime with Frank"
9	"Out With the Garbage/Dr. What-A-Mess"
10	"Ultimate What-A-Mess"
11	"This Hydrant Is Mine"
12	"Trash's Wonderful Life"
13	"Snowbound"
14	"The Thanksgiving Turkey"
15	"Santa What-A-Mess"
16	"Here Comes Santa Paws"
17	"All Around the Mallberry Bush"
18	"What-A-Mess at the Movies"
19	"His Royal Highness, Prince What-A-Mess"
20	"Party at Poppet's"
21	"Take Me Out to the Dog Park"
22	"The Watch Out Dog"
23	"Molenapped!"
24	"Pound Pals"
25	"Taste Test"
26	"Slobber on a Stick"
27	"Scout's Honor"
28	"Seein' Double"
29	"Luck on His Side"
30	"What-A-Mess Keeps the Doctor Away"
31	"There's No Business Like Shoe Business"
32	"Joy Ride"
33	"Baldwin's Family Reunion"
34	"Do the Mess Around"
35	"On Vacation"
36	"Messy Encounters"
37	"Dog Days of Summer"
38	"Fetch!"
39	"Real Puppies Don't Meow"
40	"Invasion of the Puppy Snatchers"
41	"The Ballad of El Pero"
42	"What-a-Mess Has Lunch"
43	"Walking the Boy"
44	"Messed Up What-A-Mess"
45	"Water Mess"
46	"The Big Sleep"
47	"High-Wire Heartthrob"

=== Cast ===
- Ryan O'Donohue as What-A-Mess
- Jo Ann Harris as Felicia
- Joe Nipote as Trash
- Frank Muir as Frank
- Charity James as Duchess
- Miriam Flynn as Mother
- Michael Bell as Father
- Debi Derryberry as Daughter
- Adam Hendershott as Son

==== Additional voices ====
- Charlie Adler as Freddy the Rat (in "Afghan Holiday")
- Lori Alan
- Jason Barnhill
- Jeff Bennett as Blitzen (in "Santa What-a-Mess")
- Earl Boen
- Rodger Bumpass
- Joey Camen
- Victoria Carroll
- Christine Cavanaugh
- Jim Cummings
- Tim Curry
- E. G. Daily
- Jeff Doucette
- David Doyle
- Samantha Eggar
- Jeannie Elias
- Jack Enyart
- Bill Farmer
- Dave Fennoy
- Quinton Flynn
- Pat Fraley
- Brad Garrett as Mr. Desire (in "Afghan Holiday")
- Linda Gary
- Lenny Goldsmith
- Michael Gough
- Mark Hamill
- Jess Harnell as Donner (in "Santa What-A-Mess")
- Jonathan Harris
- Dorian Harewood
- Dana Hill as Norton
- Zila Hill
- Michael Horse
- Jerry Houser
- Tino Insana
- Richard Karron
- John Kassir
- Janice Kawaye
- Tom Kenny
- Joe Lala
- Jill Larson
- Nancy Linari
- Edie McClurg
- Candi Milo as Ramona
- Iona Morris
- Tahj Mowry
- Stuart Pankin
- Michael Pataki
- Kevin Michael Richardson
- Cree Summer
- Russi Taylor as Esmeralda
- Paul Williams

== Home media ==
=== UK series ===
- What-A-Mess: 5 Hilarious Adventures – "What-a-Mess Goes to the Seaside", "What-a-Mess Goes to School", "Prince What-a-Mess", "Super What-a-Mess", "What-a-Mess Keeps Cool" (Extra Episodes – "What-a-Mess and Cynthia the Hedgehog", "What-a-Mess Has a Brain Wave!")
- What-A-Mess: Small VHS Sample – "What-a-Mess and Cynthia the Hedgehog", "What-a-Mess Has a Brain Wave!", "What-a-Mess and the Cat Next Door"
- What-A-Mess: Cat & Seaside (DVD) – consisting of the entire UK series.

=== US series ===
In October 1996, Buena Vista Home Video under the DIC Toon-Time Video imprint released two VHS tapes called Monsters, Goblins, and Ghosts, Oh my! and Here Comes Santa Paws. The former contained the segments "What-A-Mess and the Hairy Monster", "Trick Or Treat", and "My Tea Time with Frank". The latter contained the Santa What-a-Mess special.

In November 2003, Sterling Entertainment Group released a VHS/DVD called Christmas Mess, containing the Santa What-a-Mess special as well as the segments "Trash's Wonderful Life", "The Thanksgiving Turkey", Snowbound", "All Around the Mallberry Bush", "It's Raining Cats and Dogs" and "At the Movies", with the DVD version containing the segments "His Majesty, Prince What-a-Mess", "Ultimate What-a-Mess" and "This Hydrant is Mine" as bonus episodes. The DVD was re-issued by NCircle Entertainment in 2007.
