= Brothers in Law (TV series) =

1962 British television series

Brothers in Law is a British television series inspired by the 1955 comedy novel Brothers in Law by Henry Cecil Leon. It first aired on the BBC in thirteen half-hour episodes between 17 April and 10 July 1962 and followed the trials of an idealistic young lawyer entering the legal profession. The series was adapted by Frank Muir and Denis Norden, two of the most prolific sitcom writers of the era, as well as Richard Waring (who also acted in the series as Henry Blagrove).

The sitcom gave Richard Briers his first regular starring role in a television series; he also worked with writer Richard Waring and producer Graeme Muir on Marriage Lines in the same period. The series was also the TV debut of Yootha Joyce (in "Separation Order") and the final episode inspired a spin-off series, Mr Justice Duncannon featuring Andrew Cruickshank. A BBC Radio 4 adaptation featuring almost the same cast was broadcast for 39 episodes between 1970 and 1972.

== Cast ==
- Richard Briers as Roger Thursby
- John Glyn-Jones as Kendall Grimes
- June Barry as Sally Mannering (television); Julia Lockwood (radio)
- John Cazabon as Alec
- Colin Gordon as Hugh Chapfield

== Episodes ==
Due to the archiving policy of the BBC, only one episode of the series, "The Expert Witness", still exists in the BBC Archive.

1. "The First Brief" (17 April 1962)
2. "The Expert Witness" (24 April 1962)
3. "Breach of Contract" (1 May 1962)
4. "The Judgment Summons" (8 May 1962)
5. "Counsel's Opinion" (15 May 1962)
6. "Special Damages" (22 May 1962)
7. "Separation Order" (29 May 1962)
8. "Reasonable Doubt" (5 June 1962)
9. "With Use of Bath" (12 June 1962)
10. "Without Due Care" (19 June 1962)
11. "Solicitor's Instructions" (26 June 1962)
12. "Special Examiner" (3 July 1962)
13. "Counsel for the Prosecution" (10 July 1962)
