= World Medicine (magazine) =

British medical magazine (1965–1984)

World Medicine was a British medical magazine than ran from 1965 to 1984.

== History ==
The magazine was initially edited by physician and journalist Donald Gould. Physician Michael O'Donnell started as a columnist on the magazine in 1965 and, a year later, was appointed editor, a post he held until 1982. According to journalist Paul Vaughan, "O'Donnell was a remarkable medical editor, a man who had ricocheted gaily between the professions of medicine and journalism, with an occasional lurch into the theatre... He now contrived to bring all these talents together as editor of World Medicine and ... established it as a bright entertaining and - in terms of medical politics - radical newcomer".

O'Donnell himself claimed his editorial approach drew heavily on his experience in Weybridge in the 1950s when local GPs met at the cottage hospital after their morning surgeries to drink coffee and exchange ideas and gossip. "It was a time for passing on what we had learned of the clinical facts of life, and for seeking one another's advice about real problems in real patients. What made those conversations memorable were the irreverence and scepticism with which they were conducted, qualities rarely encountered in the world of medicine as it was written about. In those days, medical journals portrayed a more solemn universe than that in which we and our patients seemed to be living. When serendipity parked me in an editor's chair, I decided I wouldn't just report news about medicine but would try to reflect the uncertainties, the paradoxes, and the black comedy that make practising our craft so rewarding."

World Medicine attracted a large and intensely loyal readership but in 1982, after a dispute with the publishers over editorial policy, O'Donnell was forced to leave. In a regular column in the magazine, Karl Sabbagh had discussed the fate of the Palestinian village of Deir Yassin, razed by Jewish paramilitary groups in 1948. A letter writing campaign against the magazine resulted. A major shareholder sold its share in the magazine and the new owners offered O'Donnell a contract he felt he could not accept. The senior editorial staff resigned in sympathy and "most of his more talented contributors stopped writing for the magazine in a rare demonstration of self-sacrificial sympathy and protest." The publication closed two years later. With a new editor and new staff, it lacked, according to Paul Vaughan, "the mercurial wit and verve that were O'Donnell's trademark."

== Impact ==
An editorial in the British Medical Journal (BMJ) commented, "Michael O'Donnell, whose appointment as editor of World Medicine was abruptly ended two weeks ago, has put both the profession and the public in his debt. He has campaigned vigorously and successfully for the apparently impossible, such as reform of the GMC; he has got doctors to laugh at themselves and their practices; he has highlighted the pettiness of the jacks-in-office and their new bureaucracy; and he has exposed awkwardness that the Establishment would sooner have forgotten about. ... Not to have read Michael O'Donnell's World Medicine was to have been incomplete as a doctor".

Peter Tyrer wrote in the British Journal of Psychiatry in 2003 that, "The lighter approach was pioneered by Michael O'Donnell as editor of World Medicine in the 1970s, who introduced a brand of racy articles, debates and controversial issues in a tone of amusing and irreverent iconoclasm. At this time it was dismissed as a comic by some of the learned journals but its popularity ensured that in subsequent years its critics quietly followed suit, as any current reader of the British Medical Journal and the Lancet will testify."
