= Boase Massimi Pollitt =

British advertising agency

- Industry: Advertising
- Founded: 1968
- Parent: Omnicom
- Website: www.ddb.com

Boase Massimi Pollitt (BMP) was a British advertising agency which operated between 1968 and 2004 before being renamed as DDB London. It was purchased in 1989 by the US marketing services conglomerate Omnicom. Its lineage can be directly traced to today's agency operation Adam & Eve DDB London.

== History ==
BMP was founded in October 1968 by Martin Boase, Gabe Massimi, Stanley Pollitt and seven other executives who had previously worked at Pritchard Wood. The group struck out on their own after a failed attempt to buy the Pritchard Wood operation from its parent.

Massimi left the firm in 1971. Stanley Pollitt is co-credited with inventing the job discipline of account planning at Pritchard Wood. He died following a heart attack in 1979, an event which dealt a blow to the agency's momentum.

In 1977, the French advertising holding group Havas of France paid £1.5m for a 50% stake in BMP. It later sold its holding back to BMP.

In 1983, BMP floated on the London Stock Exchange valued at £16 million. After a hostile bid by the French company BDDP, BMP was bought in 1989 for £125 million ($200 million) by DDB Worldwide, part of Omnicom Group, the giant American marketing services holding company and thence became known as BMP DDB.

In January 2004 the company name was officially changed to DDB London, in line with the DDB network's decision to rebrand agencies it had acquired worldwide.

== Clients and reputation ==
Cadbury-Schweppes moved to the new agency at its foundation. The firm had been a client of Pritchard Wood, and BMP's first campaign was for Cadbury's Smash, a powdered mashed-potato mix. Other early BMP campaigns included the Cresta bear ("it's frothy, man"), Hofmeister bear, the Humphreys, and John Smith's Arkwright - all the work of creative director John Webster (1934–2006).

The company had a strong relationship with the Labour Party, dating from the early 1970s when it placed press advertisements for the TUC, attacking the then-Conservative government's Industrial Relations Bill. BMP created the advertising for the Labour Party in several successive general election campaigns. Chris Powell, BMP DDB Needham's chief executive until 2004, is the brother of Jonathan Powell, Tony Blair's Chief of Staff to the Prime Minister, and several people who served in the Labour Party's Shadow Communications Agency came from BMP.

A poll in 2000 that selected the UK's top 100 television commercials found that 16 were produced by BMP DDB, of which 11 were created by John Webster. An example was the BMP advertisement for the Barclaycard credit card, featuring an accident-prone card user, later expanded into the character of Johnny English played by Rowan Atkinson.
