= Carolyn Jones (British actress) =

British actress (1941–2018)

- Born: Carolyn Phyllis Jones; 18 April 1941; Vancouver, British Columbia, Canada
- Died: 25 July 2018 (aged 77)
- Education: London Academy of Music and Dramatic Art
- Occupation: Actress
- Known for: Sharon Metcalfe in Crossroads
- Spouse: Jeremy Mason (m. 1969; div. 1981)
- Relatives: Edward J. Mason (father-in-law)

Carolyn Phyllis Jones (18 April 1941 – 25 July 2018) was a British actress, best known for playing the "amorous motel garage secretary" Sharon Metcalfe in the ITV soap Crossroads.

== Early life ==
Jones was born in Vancouver, British Columbia, Canada, to Reg Jones, a journalist, and Jean Jones (nee Staniforth), a secretary, and educated at Vancouver High School and LAMDA

== Career ==
Having appeared in a semi-regular role as Lily Hever in ITV prison drama Within These Walls, in 1975, Jones appeared in the second episode of the first series of The Sweeney, playing the role of Irene Biggleswade.

In the very early 1980s, she played Portia in a production of William Shakespeare's "The Merchant of Venice" at the New Theatre, Cardiff.

In 2005, she played Vera Flannigan in Channel 5's soap opera Family Affairs

In 2012, she appeared in two episodes of EastEnders as Joy.

From 2016 to 2018, Jones played Ursula Titchener on BBC Radio 4's long-running soap The Archers.

== Personal life ==
In 1969, she married Jeremy Mason, son of scriptwriter Edward J. Mason, and they divorced in 1981, but appeared together in Crossroads throughout 1982 and into 1983.

== Selected television ==
- The Rivals of Sherlock Holmes, Anonymous Letters, episode (1973)
- Within These Walls as Lily Hever (1974–75)
- The Sweeney as Irene Biggleswade (1975)
- Crossroads as Sharon Metcalfe (1977–84)
- Family Affairs as Vera Flannigan (2005)
- EastEnders as Joy (2012)

== Selected radio ==
- The Archers as Ursula Titchener (2016–18)
