= Mr Justice Duncannon =

1963 British TV sitcom

- Genre: Sitcom
- Written by: Frank Muir; Denis Norden; Henry Cecil
- Starring: Andrew Cruickshank
- Country of origin: United Kingdom
- Original language: English
- No. of series: 1
- No. of episodes: 6

Production
- Producer: Graeme Muir
- Running time: 25 minutes

Original release
- Network: BBC TV
- Release: 18 January – 22 February 1963

Related
- Brothers in Law

Mr Justice Duncannon is a British television sitcom that aired on BBC TV from 18 January to 22 February 1963. It is a spin-off of Brothers in Law and stars Andrew Cruickshank as a London judge. The entire series was wiped and is no longer thought to exist.

== Background ==
In 1962, Brothers in Law – a 13-episode sitcom inspired by the 1955 comedy novel Brothers in Law by Henry Cecil – aired on BBC TV. The last episode, "Counsel for the Prosecution", featured Cruickshank play Mr Justice Duncannon and the character was given its own series the following year. Cecil co-wrote the programme.

== Plot ==
Duncannon is a humorous Scottish judge in London. Although stern he has a humane side. He has a fondness for women and whisky.

== Cast ==
- Andrew Cruickshank as Mr Justice Duncannon

== Episodes ==
Mr Justice Duncannon aired on Fridays, mostly at 8.50pm. Due to the archival policies of the time, all six episodes were subsequently wiped and no longer exist.

#	Title	Airdate
1	"Burden of Proof"	18 January 1963
2	"Brief to the Counsel"	25 January 1963
3	"The Whole Truth"	1 February 1963
4	"Trial and Error"	8 February 1963
5	"A Case of Whisky"	15 February 1963
6	"Orders Not to Pay"	22 February 1963
