= Neil Carter (The Archers) =

Fictional character from BBC soap opera

- The Archers character
- Portrayed by: Brian Hewlett
- Duration: 1973–present
- First appearance: February 1973
- Created by: Tony Shryane
In-universe information
- Occupation: Pig manager
- Wife: Susan Carter
- Sons: Christopher Carter
- Daughters: Emma Grundy
- Grandsons: George Grundy
- Granddaughters: Keira Grundy; Martha Carter

Neil Carter is a fictional character from the British BBC Radio 4 soap opera, The Archers. The character was introduced in February 1973 by producer Tony Shryane and has gone from a naïve teenager to a pillar of the local community. He has remained on the show for 53 years, making Hewlett one of the longest-serving soap opera actors in the world.

Neil is the husband of Susan Carter, and father to Emma Grundy and Christopher Carter. He is also the grandfather of George and Keira Grundy and Martha Carter. He has been involved in many storylines, mainly centred around his job as a pig farmer and his family, including being elected to the parish council and the imprisonment of his wife Susan in 1993 for harbouring her criminal brother, Clive.

Hewlett says the character has many "laudable qualities which make him a decent person to know" while the official Archers website describes him as "down-to-earth" and "unpretentious".

== Casting and characterisation ==
Brian Hewlett was starring in a stage performance in 1966 with Bob Arnold, who played Tom Forrest on The Archers. Bob made a casting suggestion years later to the show's producer, Tony Shryane, about enlisting Brian for the role. Shryane told Hewlett after his first recording that "we might write Neil in for a few episodes". "Neil came in as a teenager, an apprentice at Brookfield Farm," Hewlett says. "I was older but I was playing the role of teenagers in radio at the time. Tony said I could pick any Midlands accent I liked, so it really was open." Hewlett remembers the character being "nervous" about being around animals, and how Neil made some "ghastly errors" on his first day on the job.

== Development ==
=== Arrival in Ambridge ===
Hewlett recalls how the character first, under the guidance of Dan Archer, was shown the ropes on the field. In one broadcast, Neil "ploughed up a field of wheat thinking it was grass" and left the farm gate open. "He had his troubles," Hewlett recalls. "He had a fair number of girlfriends and even a drugs problem. It wasn't that he was taking drugs – they were planted on him. So he went through a sticky period. He wasn't ever a tearaway, though. He was always fairly well behaved, or tried to be." The storyline involved Neil's then-girlfriend, Sandy Miller, planting cannabis on him. Neil was sentenced to community service, and Phil Archer gave him another chance after Neil failed his farm proficiency test. In 1976, he dated Shula Archer briefly, but she dumped him for newspaper journalist Simon Parker.

=== Leptospirosis ===
Early on in his time in Ambridge, Neil suffered from Leptospirosis, a disease contracted through rats. Hewlett recalls Neil was in hospital and "very close to losing his life". "Like all good dramas, we carried it through to the point –is he going to live, is he going to die? I lived – thank you (laughs), so that was quite interesting to play."

=== Courting Susan Horrobin ===
A young Susan Horrobin won a pig as a prize and sought out Neil for advice on how to care for it. When the pig, named Pinky, escaped and Neil helped rescue him much to Susan's delight. Hewlett says this was the start of a "tentative relationship" between the pair. " I think she was quite keen on Neil, so she made a big play for him. Up until then, dear old Jethro was trying to get Neil interested in his daughter Clarrie," Hewlett says. The pair wed after a trip to London in 1985, and Susan later gave birth to a daughter, Emma.

=== Susan's imprisonment ===
In 1993, Susan was sentenced to six-months behind bars for perverting the course of justice when she harboured her criminal brother, Clive. During this time, Neil was a food rep and while Susan was in prison, he felt the temptation of a lonely farmer's wife. "There was a great temptation there, with Neil feeling down and lonely at the time. But he managed to keep his sanity," Hewlett recalls.
