= Edward J. Mason =

British scriptwriter (1912–1971)

Edward John Mason (born 8 May 1912 in Birmingham, England, died 3 February 1971) was a scriptwriter for radio, television and movies for both the BBC and its rival Radio Luxembourg.

== Career ==
Edward J. Mason had his first major success in 1947 as a script writer when the BBC Home Service radio network began airing his British detective serial Dick Barton which he created with co-writer Geoffrey Webb. This was the first serial to air on the BBC and it continued to be aired until 1951. The BBC replaced Dick Barton with The Archers, originally another creation of the Mason-Webb team, today The Archers remains the world's longest-running soap opera on radio.

In 1950 and prior to The Archers, Mason also created the radio serials The Lady Craved Excitement and What the Butler Saw, both of which were filmed in that year by Hammer Films (The Lady Craved Excitement, What the Butler Saw).

In 1954, he wrote the 6-part serial thriller Red For Danger, which was broadcast on the BBC Midlands service. In 1955, Edward J. Mason created another mystery series called Shadow Man for the BBC's English language commercial rival Radio Luxembourg. Shadow Man was sponsored by Stork Margarine and it ran on 208 at 8:30 pm on Tuesday evenings.

That same year Mason also worked on scripts for two television series: Unheimliche Begegnungen and a year later (1956) on I'm Not Bothered.

In 1958 Mason wrote 3 episodes of the television London Metropolitan Police drama Dial 999. The series was a co-production between ITV contractor ABC Weekend TV, and American television producer Ziv Television Programs

In 1960, Mason wrote for the TV mini-series The Days of Vengeance and in 1961 Flower of Evil. In 1962 his TV work included Outbreak of Murder followed in 1964 by How to be an Alien.

Mason also created a string of panel game shows with producer Tony Shryane and these included Guilty Party, My Word!, and My Music.

== Personal life ==
His son Jeremy Mason, an actor who played Roger Travers-Macy in The Archers, married the actress Carolyn Jones. Jones played Ursula Titchener in The Archers from 2016 to 2018, at the end of her career. His other son was musician and songwriter Laurence 'Lol' Mason, the former lead singer of late 1970s rock band City Boy and 1980s one hit wonders The Maisonettes.
