= Dial 999 (TV series) =

British TV crime series (1958–1959)

- Starring: Robert Beatty; Duncan Lamont; John Witty
- Country of origin: United Kingdom
- Original language: English
- No. of series: 1
- No. of episodes: 39

Production
- Running time: 30 minutes

Original release
- Network: ITV
- Release: 8 June 1958 – 11 July 1959

Dial 999 is a British television series that ran for one series of 39 episodes from 1958 to 1959.

The series was a co-production between ITV contractor ABC Weekend TV, and American television producer Ziv Television Programs.

== Synopsis ==
Named after the emergency telephone number for the United Kingdom, Dial 999 stars Robert Beatty as Canadian Mountie Mike Maguire, and follows his work fighting crime alongside London's police. Beatty was essentially reprising his role in the 1946 film Appointment with Crime, in which he played Detective Inspector Rogers, a Canadian police officer attached to Scotland Yard. The show contrasted Beatty's muscular brand of policing with that of his British colleagues, but failed to sell to North American markets.

== Cast ==
- Robert Beatty – Detective Inspector Michael McGuire
- Duncan Lamont – Detective Inspector Winter
- John Witty – Detective Sargeant West

Each episode had a different supporting cast. Notable actors who appeared include Michael Balfour, Adrienne Corri, Vera Day, William Hartnell (who had appeared in Appointment with Crime), Arthur Lowe, Patrick Magee, Sidney Tafler, Patrick Troughton and Sam Kydd

== Episodes ==
Episode	Title	Writer	Director
1	"The Killing Job"	Ted Willis	Alvin Rakoff
2	"Special Edition"	Tony O'Grady	Bernard Knowles
3	"Illegal Entry"	Brock Williams	Terence Fisher
4	"The Great Gold Robbery"	Peter Holiday	Terence Fisher
5	"Thames Division"	Brock Williams	Alvin Rakoff
6	"Missing Persons"	Ken Taylor	Bernard Knowles
7	"Honeymoon"	Neville Dasey and Ken Taylor	Bernard Knowles
8	"Commando Crook"	Gil Winfield	Terence Fisher
9	"77 Bus"	E.J. Mason	Terence Fisher
10	"Night Mail"	Jack Pulman	Bernard Knowles
11	"Escape"	Gilbert Winfield	Bernard Knowles
12	"The Big Fish"	Peter Holiday	Don Chaffey
13	"Special Branch"	Jack Rock	Terence Fisher
14	"The Mechanical Watchman"	Ken Taylor	Bernard Knowles
15	"Ghost Squad"	Neville Dasey and Peter Yeldham	Terence Fisher
16	"50,000 Hands"	Ian Greaves	Terence Fisher
17	"Fashions in Crime"	Ken Taylor	Terence Fisher
18	"Rolling Racketeers"	Tony O'Grady	Bernard Knowles
19	"24 Hours a Day"	Edward J. Mason	Alvin Rakoff
20	"Hunter, Hunted"	Gilbert Winfield	Robert Lynn
21	"A Mined Area"	Tony O'Grady	Robert Lynn
22	"The Barge Burglars"	Paul M. Jack	Robert Lynn
23	"Old Soldiers Sometimes Die"	Neville Dasey	Bernard Knowles
24	"Extradition"	Neville Dasey and Peter Yeldham	Bernard Knowles
25	"Gun Rule"	Peter Yeldham	Bernard Knowles
26	"Key Witness"	Tony O'Grady	Bernard Knowles
27	"Down to the Sea"	Ken Taylor	Bernard Knowles
28	"The Exception to the Rule"	Tony O'Grady	Bernard Knowles
29	"Deadly Blackmail"	Paul M. Jack	Bernard Knowles
30	"Payroll Job"	Gilbert Winfield	Robert Lynn
31	"The Motorbike Bandits"	B.P. Royle	Robert Lynn
32	"Living Loot"	Edward J. Mason	Bernard Knowles
33	"An Inside Job"	Gil Winfield	Bernard Knowles
34	"Picture Puzzle"	Peter Yeldham	Robert Lynn
35	"Rat Trap"	Frank White	Robert Lynn
36	"Heads or Tails"	Neville Dasey	Charles Saunders
37	"Radio Active"	Tony O'Grady	Robert Lynn
38	"Robbery with Violence"	Peter Yeldham	Alvin Rakoff
39	"Death Ride"	Philip Monroe	Bernard Knowles

== Production ==
Dial 999 was filmed at Elstree Studios, and on location in London. The programme credits acknowledge the cooperation of the Metropolitan Police.

== Home media ==
In 2021, Network DVD released all the episodes of the series on DVD in a five disc set.

== See also ==
- Dragnet - similarly-themed monochrome crime drama set in Los Angeles.
