= Four Frightened People =

1934 film by Cecil B. DeMille

- Lobby card
- Directed by: Cecil B. DeMille
- Screenplay by: Bartlett Cormack; Lenore Coffee
- Based on: Four Frightened People; 1931 novel by E. Arnot Robertson
- Produced by: Cecil B. DeMille
- Starring: Claudette Colbert; Herbert Marshall; Mary Boland; William Gargan
- Cinematography: Karl Struss
- Edited by: Anne Bauchens
- Music by: Karl Hajos; John Leipold; Milan Roder; Heinz Roemheld
- Production company: Paramount Pictures
- Distributed by: Paramount Pictures
- Release date: January 26, 1934
- Running time: 95 min. / 78 min. (1935 re-release) (USA)
- Country: United States
- Language: English

Four Frightened People is a 1934 American pre-Code adventure film directed by Cecil B. DeMille and starring Claudette Colbert, Herbert Marshall, Mary Boland, and William Gargan. It is based on the 1931 novel by E. Arnot Robertson.

== Plot ==
The film tells the story of two men and two women, who leave from a plague-ridden ship and reach the Malayan jungle. The relationships between the four people before they enter the jungle are examined and are transformed as they interact with natural phenomena and the natives who populate the jungle. The film also relates how each of the four people carried on in life after they emerged from the jungle.

== Cast ==
- Claudette Colbert as Judy Jones
- Herbert Marshall as Arnold Ainger
- Mary Boland as Mrs. Mardick
- William Gargan as Stewart Corder
- Leo Carrillo as Montague
- Nella Walker as Mrs. Ainger
- Tetsu Komai as Native Chief
- Chris-Pin Martin as Native Boatman
- Joe De La Cruz as Native
- Minoru Nishida as Native
- Teru Shimada as Native
- E.R. Jinedas as Native
- Delmar Costello as Sakais
- Ethel Griffies as Mrs. Ainger's Mother

== Filming locations ==
- Hilo, Island of Hawai'i, Hawaii

== Production crew ==
- Executive producer (uncredited) – Emanuel Cohen
- Art Direction – Roland Anderson
- Production Manager (uncredited) – Roy Burns
- Assistant Director (uncredited) – Cullen Tate, James Dugan
- Sound Mixer (uncredited) – Harry Lindgren
- Double (uncredited) – Mildred Mernie as Claudette Colbert, Bruce Warren as Herbert Marshall, Leota Lorraine as Mary Boland, Carl Mudge as William Gargan, Curley Dresden as Leo Carrillo

== Reception ==
The film was a box office disappointment for Paramount.

== Home media ==
This film, along with The Sign of the Cross, Cleopatra, The Crusades and Union Pacific, was released on DVD in 2006 by Universal Studios as part of The Cecil B. DeMille Collection.
