= The Signpost (novel) =

1943 novel by E. Arnot Robertson

First US edition (publ. Macmillan)

The Signpost is a 1943 E. Arnot Robertson novel published by Jonathan Cape, set in a remote fishing village in County Donegal during the Second World War. The main character, Tom Fairburn, is an invalided out Irish volunteer in the R.A.F. who returns to his native Cork after the Battle of Britain to the different world of his neutral home country and becomes involved with another stranger to the village, a French woman.
