= Account executive =

Role in sales

Account executive is a role in advertising, marketing, sales, and finance involving intimate understanding of a client company's objectives and products and a professional capability to provide effective advice toward creation of successful promotional activities and strategies. The account executive directly works with, and provides services to, one or more delegate officers or executives of the client company.

== Marketing and advertising industries ==
In the marketing and advertising industries, account executives are typically responsible for client servicing and client acquisition. The account executive serves as the direct link between the advertising agency or financial service company and the existing client, managing day-to-day affairs and ensuring customer satisfaction. The account executive is also tasked with bringing more clients into the agency to increase revenue. The account executive will typically have 1 or 2 assistants and reports to the respective account supervisor/manager and/or to the client service director/account director. This depends on the country and on the account (s)he is working for.

== IT organizations ==
In IT organizations, an account executive is a senior management role, responsible for executing large contracts.

Control of profit and loss is one of the main activities, together with customer alignment on a senior level. Usually, an account executive has one or more account managers in his/her staff, to cover the various towers a large contract is mainly built of.

Account executives directly or indirectly delegate work to project managers or similar team members who then direct the project management aspect.

For very large contracts, hundreds of people may be part of a larger sales and operations group involved in contract execution.

== Contract life cycle ==
In an ideal situation, at the end of a contract life cycle, the account executive and part of the staff will be involved in new contract negotiations. This could be for the same account or for a new customer. Once the contract is signed, the account executive and staff will be directly up to speed.

== Duties and responsibilities ==
Account executives have many different duties and responsibilities that they have to fulfill, such as day to day liaising via a contact method which can include email and telephone calls. This job role includes many different responsibilities such as:

- Responsible for existing account management and clients communications and conflict resolution
- Discovering client's business needs and proposing appropriate solutions
- Track and coordinate all activities occurring for each account
- Preparing regular client reports and attending client meetings
- Analyzing marketing trends and predictions and researching market conditions to develop sales goals and marketing strategies
- Developing plans to target new customers
- Developing company's account strategies, marketing strategies and promotional communication channels to introduce and promote the products and services to potential markets
- Retaining existing customers
- Negotiating and closing contracts, maintain excellent client relationships, and continually build opportunity pipeline
- Evaluating the financial aspects of business development

=== Working with clients ===
Mentioned above are a few of the duties and responsibilities in becoming an account executive. One big responsibility would be to help produce a successful campaign for clients as the marketing sector could possibly need some further help. Where the role would be to act as an important link between advertising agency and the clients. they will have a routine and have required tasks that they have to complete for the clients. For Example:

- Account planners – Working with account planners to analyse the clients brief and the chosen budget
- Meetings – Having regular meetings to discuss the advertising needs and their requirements
- Deadlines – Agreeing to deadlines for specific tasks with the clients
- Management – having to manage accounts and different invoicing the clients

The basis of this role is to be able to understand the task the client has set out. From this, they will then have to organise the agency's creative and administrative staff in order for the client's request to be completed to the standard.

== Required skills ==
Working in this field as an account executive, they must have the ability to demonstrate many skills in different areas. The skills that are required consist of the following:

- Motivational and excellent communication skills
- Having the ability to prioritize tasks as well as multitasking
- Have a good understanding of business processes
- Being organized
- Taking on task independently
- Working well in a team

These skills are a requirement when applying for a position as an account executive. For example, good communication skills are needed because the employee will need to be confident in addressing with a variety of clients. Motivational skills are required as they need to motivate junior employees and represent the company as efficient to the general public and the clients.

In any company when working as an account executive, each agency will be expecting and looking for different sets of skills from the employees. It is important that they have developed the skills. These include:

- Having a keen eye for detail and an understanding of budgetary constraints
- Self-confidence and trust-building
- Fluency of digital platforms
- The ability to work under pressure

When an employee has developed or enhanced their skills and built a trustworthy reputation within the company, they can then go forward and request a higher position such as account director.
