= Frank Muir =

English comedy writer (1920–1998)

Frank Muir CBE
- Muir in 1970
- Born: Frank Herbert Muir; 5 February 1920; Ramsgate, Kent, England
- Died: 2 January 1998 (aged 77); Thorpe, Surrey, England
- Occupations: Writer, radio and television personality
- Years active: 1948–1998
- Spouse: Polly McIrvine (m. 1949)
- Military career
- Allegiance: United Kingdom
- Branch: Royal Air Force
- Service years: 1939–1945
- Conflicts: Second World War

Frank Herbert Muir (5 February 1920 – 2 January 1998) was a British comedy writer, radio and television personality, and raconteur. His writing and performing partnership with Denis Norden endured for most of their careers. Together they wrote BBC Radio's Take It from Here for over 10 years, and then appeared on BBC radio quizzes My Word! and My Music for another 35. Muir became assistant head of light entertainment at the BBC in the 1960s, and was then London Weekend Television's founding head of entertainment. His many writing credits include editorship of The Oxford Book of Humorous Prose, as well as the What-a-Mess children's books that were later turned into an animated TV series.

== Birth and early life ==
Muir was the second son of a steam tug engineer, Charles James Muir (1888–1934), originally from New Zealand, and his wife Margaret, daughter of ship's carpenter Harry Harding. Harry Harding had died young at sea; his widow, Elizabeth Jane (née Cowie) subsequently married Frank Herbert Webber, a former lighthouse inspector and licensee of the Derby Arms Hotel and pub at Ramsgate, Kent. The pub was operated by his widow for 22 years after Webber's death. Muir was born in the pub, on 5 February 1920, and spent part of his childhood in Leyton, Essex (now part of London). Charles Muir left his seafaring occupation after marrying, and took up unskilled work such as extending Ramsgate's railway and loading stores onto naval vessels; he finally took a job with a firm at Leyton, supervising their machinery, and died of pneumonia when Frank Muir was a schoolboy. Margaret Muir ran a small sweet-shop across the road from the Derby Arms.

In later years, whenever his dignified speech patterns caused listeners to assume that he had received a public school education, Muir would demur: "I was educated in E10, not Eton". He attended Leyton County High School for Boys, though prior to this he was a pupil at Chatham House Grammar School, in Ramsgate, Kent, whose notable alumni include the former Conservative Prime Minister Edward Heath. He left school prematurely aged 14 and a half at his father's death, needing to earn an income to support the family. Muir claimed that, when interviewed to join the RAF, he was "a weedy 6 feet 6 inches [1.98 m]" but that he later "stabilised at a bent 6 feet 4 inches [1.93 m]".

== Early career ==
Muir joined the Royal Air Force at the outbreak of the Second World War and spent several years in the photographic technical school taking slow-motion film of parachute jumps on a project intended to decrease the frequency of parachutes failing (sometimes called a 'Roman Candle'). His work provided the manufacturers with the information they needed to improve both the equipment and the training, which was very effective in reducing the number of failures as well as the fatality and injury rate. He was also assigned to take pictures of the agents of the Special Operations Executive (SOE) for identity documents at the training centre at RAF Ringway.

Muir, as a photographic technician, was posted to Iceland, which was then a Danish possession under British occupation, and while there, he did some work for the forces radio station. Also while stationed in Iceland – as he described in his memoirs A Kentish Lad – Muir suffered a medical condition which required the surgical removal of one testicle.

== Writing for radio ==
Upon his return to civilian life, he began to write scripts for Jimmy Edwards. When Edwards teamed up with Dick Bentley on BBC Radio, Muir formed a partnership with Denis Norden, Bentley's writer, which was to last for most of his career. The vehicle created for Bentley and Edwards, Take It from Here, was written by Muir and Norden from 1948 until 1959; the last series in 1960 used other writers. For TIFH, as it became known, they created "The Glums", a deliberately awful family, which was the show's most popular segment. For TIFH, Muir and Norden wrote the phrase, "Infamy, infamy, they've all got it in for me", later used to great acclaim by Kenneth Williams in Carry On Cleo. In his autobiography A Kentish Lad Muir expressed disappointment that he and Norden were never credited for it.

Muir and Norden continued to write for Edwards when he began to work for BBC television with the school comedy series Whack-O! and the subsequent 1960 film Bottoms Up!, and in the anthology series Faces of Jim. With Norden, in 1962, he was responsible for the television adaptation of Henry Cecil's comic novel Brothers in Law, which starred a young Richard Briers, and its spin-off Mr Justice Duncannon.

The pair were invited to appear on a new humorous literary radio quiz, My Word!. In the final round Muir and Norden each told a story to "explain" the origin of a well-known phrase. An early example took the quotation "Dead! And never called me mother!" from a stage adaptation of East Lynne by Mrs Henry Wood, which became the exclamation of a youth coming out of a public telephone box which he had discovered to be out of order. In early broadcasts of My Word! the phrases were provided by the quizmaster, but in later series Muir and Norden chose their own in advance of each programme and their stories became longer and more convoluted. This became a popular segment of the quiz, and Muir and Norden later compiled five volumes of books containing some of the My Word! stories.

Frank Muir was also, like Norden, a contestant on the My Word! spinoff, My Music. As a television personality, Muir's unofficial trademark was a crisply knotted pink bow tie.

== Later career ==
In 1954 Muir founded an amateur dramatic society, Thorpe Players, in the village of Thorpe, Surrey where he lived for many years. He was a writer and presenter on many shows, including the 1960s satire programmes That Was the Week That Was and The Frost Report. He was well known to television audiences as a team captain on the long-running BBC2 series Call My Bluff. Muir found unexpected household fame when he undertook voice-overs for advertisements, including Cadbury Dairy Milk Fruit & Nut chocolate ("Everyone's a Fruit and Nut case", to the tune of the Danse des mirlitons from Tchaikovsky's The Nutcracker). Other popular advertising campaigns of the period in which Muir appeared included Batchelors' Savoury Rice ("Every grain will drive them insane!"), a coffee advert in which he used the phrase "impending doom", and Unigate milk Humphreys. In the 1960s Muir was Assistant Head of Light Entertainment at the BBC and in 1969 joined London Weekend Television as Head of Entertainment.

In 1976 Muir wrote The Frank Muir Book: An irreverent companion to social history, which is a collection of anecdotes and quotations collected under various subjects including "Music", "Education", "Literature", "Theatre", "Art" and "Food and Drink". (In the United States, this book is titled "An Irreverent Social History of Almost Everything.") A similar format to The Frank Muir Book was used in his BBC radio series Frank Muir Goes Into..., in which Alfred Marks read the quotations, linked verbally by Muir. He published books based on these series. In 1982 he presented the BBC television film The Funny Side of Christmas. His The Oxford Book of Humorous Prose, which again uses a similar format with more scholarly aspirations, was published in 1990.

Muir was appointed Commander of the Order of the British Empire CBE in the 1980 Birthday Honours. In 1992, for Channel 4, he was the host of TV Heaven, a season of evenings dedicated to television programmes from individual years. In 1997, Muir published an autobiography, A Kentish Lad.

== Personal life and death ==
In 1949, Muir married Polly McIrvine. They had two children. He was a Catholic and attended church in Egham Hythe until his death.

Muir died in Thorpe, Surrey, on 2 January 1998 at the age of 77. In November 1998, ten months after his death, he and Denis Norden were joint recipients of the Writers' Guild of Great Britain Writer of the Year Award. Muir's widow, Polly, died in Surrey on 27 October 2004, aged 79.

== Bibliography ==
- Christmas Customs and Traditions (1975)
- The Frank Muir Book: An Irreverent Companion to Social History (1976); US title, An Irreverent and Thoroughly Incomplete Social History of Almost Everything
- A Book at Bathtime (1982); US title, An Irreverent and Almost Complete Social History of the Bathroom
- The Oxford Book of Humorous Prose from William Caxton to P. G. Wodehouse: A Conducted Tour (1990), compiled and edited by Muir, Oxford University Press
- The Walpole Orange: A Romance (1993) – OCLC 30156859
- A Kentish Lad: The Autobiography of Frank Muir (1997)

Series

- What-a-Mess series, illustrated by Joseph Wright – children's books; adapted as animated TV series 1979, 1996
- My Word! Stories series, by Muir and Denis Norden – story collections

Academic offices
| Preceded by Alan Coren | Rector of the University of St Andrews; 1976–1979 | Succeeded by Tim Brooke-Taylor |
