= John Calder =

Scottish publisher (1927–2018)

- Born: 25 January 1927; Montreal, Canada
- Died: 13 August 2018 (aged 91); Edinburgh, Scotland
- Education: Bishop's College School
- Occupation: Publisher
- Known for: Founder of Calder Publishing

John Mackenzie Calder (25 January 1927 – 13 August 2018) was a Scottish-Canadian writer and publisher who founded the company Calder Publishing in 1949.

== Biography ==
Calder was born in Montreal, Canada, into the Calder family associated with the brewing industry in Alloa, Scotland, and spent his childhood in Kinross, and studied at Bishop's College School in Sherbrooke before studying economics in Zürich, Switzerland, in the late 1940s.

About 1950, Calder went into partnership with Neville Armstrong in a short-lived publishing enterprise called Spearman Calder.

Calder was a friend of Samuel Beckett, becoming the main publisher of his prose-texts in Britain after the success of Waiting for Godot on the London stage in 1955–56. During the 1950s, Calder published the translated work of Anton Chekhov, Leo Tolstoy, Fyodor Dostoevsky, Goethe and Zola, including most of the work of April FitzLyon, and was the first publisher to make William S. Burroughs available in the United Kingdom.

From 1963 to 1975, Calder was in partnership with Marion Boyars, and the company was known as Calder and Boyars. The championing of freedom of speech led to Calder's involvement in a number of prosecutions for obscenity, including one in 1966 for publishing Hubert Selby Jr's Last Exit to Brooklyn. While the initial trial resulted in a guilty verdict, the case was won on appeal, and effectively ended literary censorship in Britain.

Calder published (via his imprints, John Calder, Calder & Boyars or Calder Publications) a series of book series including Calderbooks and European Classics.

In 1964, Calder joined the Who Killed Kennedy? Committee set up by Bertrand Russell.

The last novelist to be signed to the company by John Calder personally was Carole Morin whose Penniless in Park Lane he published in 2001.

The imprint continues to publish Howard Barker, Tim Waterstone, and other figures of literature both past and present. In 2002, John Calder opened The Calder Bookshop Theatre at 51 The Cut, Waterloo, London. To celebrate his fifty years in publishing, the arts and politics a festschrift was produced. During 2006, Lou MacLoughlan and Louise Milne produced the documentary John Calder: A Life in Publishing commemorating his life.

In April 2007, Calder sold his business to independent publishers Alma Books/Oneworld Classics; the imprint retained his name, while the rights to the non-theatrical work of Beckett were acquired by Faber.

Calder was a co-founder of the Traverse Theatre in Edinburgh. He was also responsible, along with Sonia Orwell and Jim Haynes, for devising and co-creating an International Writers' Conference held at the Edinburgh International Festival in 1962 and then a Drama Conference with Kenneth Tynan in 1963. These innovative events, intended to draw together writers from all over the world, were arguably a forerunner of the Edinburgh Book Festival, which was not founded for another twenty years. The experience of this first conference was revisited at a Book Festival discussion during the 2012 Edinburgh International Festival.

Calder also led a hectic life outside publishing. He was a major investor in the Partisan Coffee House, a radical New Left venue in Soho. In 1970, he stood for election as a Scottish Liberal Party candidate for Kinross and Western Perthshire, finishing fourth.

However, he was otherwise mainly known for his interests in the arts in general and his passion for opera in particular. In 1963 he founded and ran for some ten years Ledlanet Nights, a general festival of the arts, held in the hall of his then home, a baronial house at Ledlanet, near Milnathort.

He published his autobiography, Pursuit: the Uncensored Memoirs of John Calder, in 2001, and various other works related to Beckett.

Towards the end of his life Calder published three books of poetry What's Wrong? What's Right?: Poems (1999), Solo: Collected Poems 1997-2007 (2007), and Being – Seeing – Feeling – Healing – Meaning (2012).

== Personal life ==
Calder was married to Christya Myling from 1954 to 1961. They have a daughter named Jamie (b. 1954). Calder and Bettina Jonic were married in 1961. That lasted until 1975, and produced another daughter, Anastasia (b. 1963). Calder had a long-term relationship with Muriel Leyner, mother of author Mark Leyner, from 1983 to 2005. Calder married Sheila Colvin, who had been a friend and partner from his earliest involvement with the arts, and the Traverse Theatre in Edinburgh. She is a former associate director of the Edinburgh International Festival and director of the Aldeburgh Festival. The couple lived in Edinburgh and Paris.

Calder died in Edinburgh on 13 August 2018, aged 91.

== The John Calder Translation Prize ==
The John Calder Translation Prize was created in his memory. Supported by Alma Books and Sheila Colvin-Calder, it is an annual award "to celebrate new and ambitious translations into English of full-length works (fiction, non-fiction and poetry) which are distinguished by the highly personal and imaginative approach of the authors to their subject. Submissions can be from any language into English." It is administered by the Society of Authors. The inaugural judges are Fiona Sze-Lorrain, Jon McGregor, and Helen Oyeyemi.

== See also ==
- List of Bishop's College School alumni
