= Account planning =

Account planning brings the consumer focus into advertising development process. The discipline and its tools and techniques help build unique directions, propositions, and communications concepts across advertising and marketing channels. The Account Planner, or simply Planner, has a role to identify and empathizing with the target market and utilizing multiple types of data (primary, secondary, web, usage) to unlock insight that create value for the consumer, the brand, and the Product (business) or service category. The thoughts and observations are compiled into a value proposition and form a document, often called a creative brief, that is used to create and inspire advertising campaigns and other marketing communications.

Account planning is an advertising agency discipline and sometimes department that works alongside client facing managers (account management), buying advertising (media), and creating advertising (creative). Around the late 1970s and early 1980s, US ad agencies introduced this 'new' discipline from the UK called account planning which became a primary function in most US ad agencies in the 1990s. 'Account planners have often been called 'the left side of a creative brain'. Their primary function is to find consumer truth and insight that helps the creative teams create work that is not only entertaining and highly memorable but also relevant to the consumer and effective in the marketplace. Creative ideas that drive business are more typically the result of a strong collaboration between creative teams and account planners.

Account planners (sometimes also called brand planners and strategic planners) use primary and secondary research to inform their strategic thinking and are ultimately responsible for the work that informs, and the penning of, the creative brief. If the creatives are closest to the idea, and the account manager is closest to the client, the account planner is closest to the consumer. The account planner is the person on an advertising team who is most likely to have spent time with consumers (for B to C) or customers (B to B), observing the consumer's path to purchase, by using research such as ethnographies, focus groups or quantitative/social studies, asking consumers how they think about and use the product or service. And in an era in which the brand is at least as important as a specific product (for instance, Nike as a brand has a place in the culture that far exceeds the particular performance characteristics of their shoes), the account planner is responsible for understanding the place of the brand in the consumer's mind. This is not just a simple research function - planning truly begins when research ends - and account planners stay engaged in the campaign process from the initial client briefing and throughout the advertising cycle.

Rather than offering research insights to others at a single point in time, they use research to continue to provide insights into the campaign process and most importantly these days, help track advertising effectiveness. Whereas previously, account planners focused on the use of traditional primary research tools, digital/social networks have given them the ability to listen to and interact with consumers in new ways and to work more closely with channel or media planners throughout the process closely also, to not only help plan effective advertising but also engage with consumers in the most effective ways.

== History ==
Account planning is a job title that exists in most London and UK advertising agencies. Account planning gained an initial foothold in the US in the early 80s but really only evolved to become an essential function in most mid to large sized agencies in the early 90s.

The earliest instance of the role was conceived in Australia in 1965 by David Brent, a senior researcher at Unilever who had served as a senior para-military police commander in a long, major counter-insurgency jungle war in Asia. Operative in the national secret service, he later changed to a more public life in ad agency account services, creative writing and media management. These qualifications, skills and experiences led to the launch of the new role in a Sydney agency in 1966.

Beginning in 1965, Stanley Pollitt felt that account managers were using information incompetently or inexpediently because the researcher was not involved in the campaign process. Because of this, Pollitt suggested that a specially trained researcher should work with the account manager as an equal partner. After the opening of the Boase Massimi Pollitt (BMP) agency, in 1968, Pollitt introduced his idea, only slightly revised. Stephen King, believing that clients deserved a better way of doing things, proposed a process of advertising development that had a little less gut feeling and a little more scientific foundation. This process involved rigorous analysis of a brand and its position in the competitive market place. This process creates an advertising message from the marketing objectives and the client's business objectives.

As early as June 1964, King had introduced the T-Plan (Target Plan) at JWT, a framework for combining market research with consumer insight in the creative development process; the methodology was later codified in the agency's 37-page 1974 JWT Planning Guide, which is widely credited with formalizing advertising strategy as a discipline. At the centre of the guide is the Planning Cycle, a sequence of five questions intended to provide a systematic basis for strategy development; commentators have described its enduring contribution as the articulation of a central paradox in the discipline, namely the application of disciplined analytical thinking to innovative outcomes. In 1968, J. Walter Thompson (JWT) established a new department called "account planning," coined by Tony Stead.

While the UK pioneers held recognized senior management positions within advertising agencies, whereas the Australian pioneer's background was in market research, working alongside Unilever, across its various brands. This followed earlier experience in advertising agency account management and creative writing in Singapore and Sydney.

The time taken to determine the agency problem and the solution, the radical new concept of an ad agency specialist multi-skilled role, was nearly four years at Unilever Australia in 1965. The two UK pioneers appeared to take much longer.

While UK agencies spent several years experimenting to define the qualifications for the account planning role, the transition in Australia was more immediate. The discipline was introduced directly by a pioneer who already possessed background in market research at Unilever as well as prior agency account management experience.

In Australia the original new role was probably more comprehensive and holistic and concerned with total brand health including advertising compared to the UK where the pioneers were initially more concerned with the development of campaigns.

The UK pioneers developed the role in their agencies supported by colleagues and friends. In Australia it was much tougher with trail-blazing the radical new role, with some determined to deny any acceptance of the planning pioneer.

One aspect of the original ad agency multi-skilled planning role has never been specifically highlighted before. This is the added level of skills derived from the symbiosis of quality multi-skilling – marketing, market research, intelligence, planning and advertising - which helps to develop insights and outcomes that less qualified and involved planners find difficult to achieve.

In the UK the pioneers are credited with applying their skills in their large agencies to develop high‑quality education material and were focused on training others in the complex new agency role. In Australia the pioneer planner did not train others. He applied his own skills and experiences – marketing, market research, intelligence, planning and advertising – to effectively compete with non-planning agencies for new business and to build rapid growth in his agency. Much later he mounted a website, with case studies and client endorsements to demonstrate the notable success of the new role influenced by Unilever Australia.

The backgrounds of the two UK pioneers were relatively straightforward – graduates from Oxbridge who entered the advertising industry, enjoying the culture, literary elegance and stylish ambience in their large and successful London ad agencies. The background of the Australian pioneer was very different. Early childhood in tropical Malaya and tragic family losses during the war against Japan; completed education in the UK; entered military service and served as a platoon commander in the defense of NATO; special training with the London Metropolitan Police; returned to his original home country, Malaya, in 1952 as a senior para-military police officer during the Malayan Emergency, the counter-insurgency conflict against communist insurgents. commanded several large police districts, commanded counter-insurgency jungle operations, served in the paramount secret service; during the counter-insurgency campaign; worked in market research and in ad agency account management and creative writing in Singapore and Sydney, Australia before joining Unilever Australia in 1962.

Some references are – The Director General, Incorporated Society of British Advertisers [ISBA]. History of Advertising Trust [HAT]. Australian Market and Social Research Society [AMSRS]. Australian Association of National Advertisers [AANA]. All the aforesaid, also including the Advertising Association and the Institute of Practitioners in Advertising in the UK have received copies of endorsements by ad agency chiefs and appreciative advertiser managers, Articles in Australian industry journals including Ad News and B&T. The history of ad agency planning in Australia including many case studies and advertiser managers' endorsements at afore mentioned www.originplan.com. Articles in the newsletters of the Australian Account Planning Group [APG] in 2005 and 2006. David Brent's appearance in the BBC TV documentary 'Empire Warriors – The Intelligence War' [2004] about the long war 1948-60 in Malaya against the communists.

== From the UK to the US and beyond ==
Several Agency groups began to recognize the value of this new discipline and its relevance to global mac clients. Given the success the JWT partnership of Stephen King and Judy Lannon had in servicing and growing business from the likes of Nestle, Unilever, a global Account Planning Council was established in the late 70's, and included people like George Clements (Canada), Rena Bartos (USA), Rob Langtry and Maxine Krige (Australia). Local departments adopted the methodology (e.g., JWT's 'TPlan') and offered research and planning to local and global clients (e.g., Kellogg, Unilever, Nestle, Kraft). Similar moves saw planning introduced by other Australian agencies in the late 1978/1979 (viz. Lintas, The Campaign Palace, McCann-Erickson). Trade media in Australia (B&T, Ad News) followed developments closely and help build market presence for the discipline. In London, the Account Planning Group (APG) was established in 1979 with Charles Channon as its first chair, becoming the longest-running professional body representing the interests of account planners and communications strategists; its Creative Strategy Awards have been presented every two years since 1993.

The first local agency in the United States to develop an account planning department was Chiat\Day (now TBWA\Chiat\Day). Jay Chiat took notice of the new department that was being met with success over in the UK and throughout Europe. (Tran, 1999) Chiat believed that account planning was crucial to creative work and he also believed, at the time, that British creative work was far better than American work. He was also not a fan of typical market research, stating that it is "what already has been done." Planning is about discovering new things.

It has been stated that "Jay Chiat did not decide to experiment with account planning. He decided to have account planning." He knew that he had to integrate the idea into his already established agency. In 1982 he hired Jane Newman, a British planner, to come and work for his office in New York City. Newman had previously worked at BMP and Ammirati and Puris. To develop the department, Newman hand-picked Jeff DeJoseph from the Young and Rubicam media department to be her first planner on staff. As the department grew, so did Chiat\Day. In ten years, the agency grew from billings of $50 million to $700 million.

Many agencies noticed the success of Chiat\Day, and desired to have their own account planning department. Their rationale was that it would be the key to their success as well. Many creative shops added planning departments, helping propel them from boutique to agency, and picking up national accounts along the way." (Tran, 1999) Other planners such as Jon Steel and Nigel Carr came over from the UK to help pioneer. (Newman, 1998) Companies such as Ogilvy & Mather, DDB Needham N.Y., and Goodby, Silverstein & Partners quickly restructured their agencies to fit in a planning department.

In the US, a country with an average of 12 minutes of ad time per hour of television programming, the increasing number or proliferation of additional programming has contributed to an increasing number of advertisements and combined with the increase in new media channels such as digital/ on-line and the growth of mobile, this has led to a significant increase in what many consumers ultimately view as clutter. For those marketers who had the fear of getting lost, planning seemed to be the magical tool to "break through the clutter." For, the "mantra" of account planning is "relevant plus distinctive equals more effective.

It was during the 1990s that account planning grew tremendously within the United States. (Tran, 1999) As of 1995, planning was "at a boiling point, spilling into every corner of the advertising landscape." (Goldman, 1995) Goldman states: "Agencies of every description want it or say they have it - even if they don't know what it is." After some of the best agencies in the field added account planning to their list of services, planning became a "buzz word" within the field. "Agencies of all sizes, specialties and philosophies began posting want ads, practically recruiting anyone who was 'related to the discipline.'"

Several agency groups recognised the relevance of the new discipline to global clients. The JWT partnership of Stephen King and Judy Lannon serviced multinational accounts including Nestlé and Unilever, and a global Account Planning Council was established in the late 1970s with members from Canada, the United States and Australia. Local departments adopted the T-Plan methodology and offered research and planning to clients such as Kellogg, Unilever, Nestlé and Kraft. Planning was introduced by Australian agencies including Lintas, The Campaign Palace and McCann-Erickson in 1978 and 1979. The first United States agency to develop an account planning department was Chiat\Day (later TBWA\Chiat\Day). Jay Chiat had observed the discipline's success in the United Kingdom and considered the introduction of planning essential to maintaining creative relevance at his agency. In 1982 he hired Jane Newman, a British planner who had previously worked at BMP and Ammirati and Puris, to establish the function at the agency's New York office. Newman recruited Jeff DeJoseph from the Young & Rubicam media department as the department's first additional planner, and in 1988 became president of Chiat\Day New York, the first planner to hold that title at a United States agency.

Other United States agencies, including Ogilvy & Mather, DDB Needham and Goodby, Silverstein & Partners, subsequently established planning functions. Surveys of US agencies indicate that account planning expanded rapidly during the 1990s and had become a standard mid-to-large agency function by the end of the decade. Planners articulated the discipline's aim as ensuring that advertising remained both relevant to consumers and distinctive from competitors, a formulation that became a guiding principle for the role.

== Roles and responsibilities ==
The primary function of an account planner is to act as the consumer's representative within the agency, balancing the client's business objectives with consumer insights. While account managers oversee client relations and creative teams focus on execution, the planner specialises in understanding audience behaviour and market trends.

The core responsibilities of the role typically include defining the advertising task by synthesising client briefs, market data and competitive analyses to identify the central communication challenge. Developing the creative brief as the foundational strategic document that establishes brand positioning and sets directional boundaries for creative work. Conducting qualitative and quantitative research, including ethnographies, focus groups and data analytics, to monitor the consumer's path to purchase, and pre-testing campaign concepts to gauge consumer response while tracking post-launch campaign effectiveness in the marketplace.

The discipline operates on the principle that effective advertising should be both culturally relevant and distinctive to achieve market differentiation. By integrating strategic research directly into the creative cycle, account planning aims to foster inter-departmental alignment and to reduce reliance on subjective judgment during campaign evaluations.

== Digital era ==
A historical review of the discipline identifies three chronological stages of account planning, suggesting that the traditional model "was well formed functionally in the 1990s and peaked in prominence around the turn of the new millennium" before being reshaped by digital media, programmatic buying and the growth of in-house client data teams. Interview-based research with practitioners has documented five major disruptions to the role, including the displacement of qualitative consumer research by behavioural data, the fragmentation of audiences across owned, earned and paid channels, and the migration of planning expertise from agencies to consultancies and brand-side teams. Contemporary account planning textbooks accordingly position the planner as an integrator across integrated marketing communications and media-neutral strategy, with competencies extending to search, social platforms, content marketing and data visualization.
