= Joseph Wright (illustrator) =

English illustrator and cartoonist (1947–2017)

Joseph Wright (17 July 1947 — 6 October 2017) was an English illustrator and cartoonist best known for his illustration of the children's book series What-a-Mess. His cartoons and illustrations also appeared in a number of newspapers and magazines including The Times, The Guardian, The Independent, Punch, the Radio Times, Time Out, New Society and New Statesman.

Wright was born in Ulverston, Cumbria. He was educated at the Royal College of Art in London.
