= Tony Shryane =

Anthony Joseph Shryane MBE (20 January 1919 – 22 September 2003) was a long-serving producer of radio programmes for the BBC. He was born in Harborne, Birmingham.

He was the first producer of The Archers, in which capacity he served for 28 years until his retirement in 1979. He also produced several popular panel games devised with Edward J. Mason, including Guilty Party, My Word!, and My Music.

In 1961, he was appointed MBE for services to broadcasting.

He continued working for the BBC on a freelance basis after his official retirement, finally retiring for good in 1984 after fifty years of service.

== References and external links ==
- BBC press release marking Shryane's death
- Telegraph obituary
