= Comedy Playhouse =

1961–1975 British television series

- Titlecard for the 1961/1962 series episode "The Offer". This episode was the pilot for Steptoe and Son.
- Created by: Tom Sloan
- Starring: Various
- Country of origin: United Kingdom
- Original language: English
- No. of episodes: 137 (95 missing)

Production
- Running time: Usually 25 minutes, 30 minutes or 35 minutes

Original release
- Network: BBC1
- Release: 15 December 1961 – 9 July 1975
- Release: 29 April 2014 – 15 September 2017

Comedy Playhouse is a long-running British anthology series of one-off unrelated sitcoms that aired for 128 episodes from 1961 to 1975. Many episodes later graduated to their own series, including Steptoe and Son, Meet the Wife, Till Death Us Do Part, All Gas and Gaiters, Up Pompeii!, Not in Front of the Children, Me Mammy, That's Your Funeral, The Liver Birds, Are You Being Served? and particularly Last of the Summer Wine, which is the world's longest running sitcom, having run from January 1973 to August 2010. In all, 27 sitcoms started from a pilot in the Comedy Playhouse strand.

In March 2014, it was announced that Comedy Playhouse would make a return that year with three new episodes. Two further series each comprising three episodes were broadcast in 2016 and 2017 respectively.

== Background ==
The series began in 1961 at the prompting of Tom Sloan, Head of BBC Light Entertainment at the time. Galton and Simpson were no longer writing for Tony Hancock and Sloan asked them to write ten one-offs with the hope that one might become established as a series. Thus, the first two series of Comedy Playhouse were written by Ray Galton and Alan Simpson, but from the third series onwards, the episodes were written by various writers including the likes of Barry Took, Bernard McKenna, Bob Larbey, Brian Cooke, Carla Lane, Craig Cash, David Croft, Dick Clement, Dick Hills, Doug Naylor, Edwin Apps, George Evans, Graham Chapman, Harry Driver, Jack Docherty, Jack Rosenthal, Jeremy Lloyd, John Esmonde, John T. Chapman, Johnny Speight, Ian La Frenais, Ken Hoare, Kingsley Amis, Jilly Cooper, Marty Feldman, Michael Pertwee, Neil Shand, Pauline Devaney, Peter Jones, P.G. Wodehouse, Richard Harris, Ronald Chesney, Ronald Woolfe, Roy Clarke, Richard Waring, Sid Green and Vince Powell.

== Archive status ==
The first eight series were made in black and white, with the rest from Up Pompeii! onwards being in colour. Like many television programmes from the time, many of 1960s & 1970s episodes are lost. As a result, 95 episodes are currently missing from the archives, although audio recordings from the soundtracks of 15 missing episodes have been recovered, short extracts survive from Till Death Us Do Part and Thank You Sir, Thank You Madam, and a further episode The Melting Pot survives as a U-Matic video copy.

In Australia the series was broadcast on ABC Television in the early 1960s-late 1970s.

== Commercial release ==
The series itself hasn't been released on home media, although some of the surviving episodes have been repeated on television or included on DVD boxsets as pilot episodes to their respective series. These include Steptoe and Son (The Offer), Meet The Wife (The Bed), All Gas and Gaiters (The Bishop Rides Again), Up Pompeii!, Are You Being Served?, Last of the Summer Wine (Of Funerals and Fish) and Happy Ever After. Clips from the series were also featured in the documentary Comedy Playhouse: Where It All Began, which was broadcast on BBC1 on 29 April 2014, which featured interviews with actors and writers who participated in the series, including Ray Galton, Alan Simpson, June Whitfield, Bernard Cribbins and Keith Barron.

== Episodes ==
=== Series 1 (1961–2) ===
No. overall	No. in series	Title	Archival Status	Media	Original release date
1	1	"Cliquot et Fils"	Missing	N/A	15 December 1961
Starring Eric Sykes, Warren Mitchell, Charles Lloyd Pack, Frank Thornton and Joan Hickson.
2	2	"Lunch in the Park"	Missing	N/A	22 December 1961
Starring Stanley Baxter, Daphne Anderson and Roger Avon.
3	3	"The Private Lives of Edward Whiteley"	Missing	N/A	29 December 1961
Starring Tony Britton, Raymond Huntley and Terence Alexander.
4	4	"The Offer"	Exists	TR16	5 January 1962
Starring Wilfrid Brambell and Harry H. Corbett.
5	5	"The Reunion"	Missing	N/A	12 January 1962
Starring Lee Montague, J. G. Devlin, Dick Emery, Patrick Cargill, Jerold Wells, Bernard Goldman, David Gregory and Cameron Hall.
6	6	"The Telephone Call"	Missing	N/A	19 January 1962
Starring Peter Jones, June Whitfield, Richard Caldicot, Derek Bond, Harold Lang and Roger Avon.
7	7	"The Status Symbol"	Missing	N/A	26 January 1962
Starring Alfred Marks and Graham Stark.
8	8	"Visiting Day"	Missing	N/A	2 February 1962
Starring Bernard Cribbins, Betty Marsden, Wilfrid Brambell, Hugh Lloyd and Molly Weir.
9	9	"Sealed with a Loving Kiss"	Missing	N/A	9 February 1962
Starring Ronald Fraser, Avril Elgar, Gladys Henson, Vic Wise and Rita Webb.
10	10	"The Channel Swimmer"	Missing	N/A	16 February 1962
Starring Michael Brennan, Warren Mitchell, Sydney Tafler, Frank Thornton, Bob Todd and Joe Gibbons.

=== Series 2 (1963) ===
No. overall	No. in series	Title	Archival Status	Media	Original release date
11	1	"Our Man in Moscow"	Exists	TR16	1 March 1963
Starring Robert Morley, Patrick Wymark, Frank Thornton, Anthony Newlands and Peter Thompson.
12	2	"And Here, All the Way From..."	Exists	TR16	8 March 1963
Starring Eric Barker, Erica Rogers, Terence Alexander, Roger Delgado and Roger Avon.
13	3	"Impasse"	Exists	TR16	15 March 1963
Starring Bernard Cribbins, Yootha Joyce, Leslie Phillips, Georgina Cookson, Harry Locke, Duncan Macrae and Campbell Singer.
14	4	"Have You Read This Notice?"	Missing	N/A	29 March 1963
Starring Frankie Howerd, Bill Kerr, Edwin Apps and Graham Ashley.
15	5	"A Clerical Error"	Exists	TR16	5 April 1963
Starring John Le Mesurier, Russell Napier, Yootha Joyce, Blake Butler, Andy Devine and John Caesar.
16	6	"The Handyman"	Exists	TR16	12 April 1963
Starring Alfred Marks, Anthony Sharp, Damaris Hayman, Frank Williams, Edwin Apps, Julian Orchard and John Harvey.

=== Series 3 (1963-4) ===
No. overall	No. in series	Title	Archival Status	Media	Original release date
17	1	"On the Knocker"	Missing	N/A	28 September 1963
Starring Ronald Fraser, Alfred Burke and Noel Johnson.
18	2	"Underworld Knights"	Missing	N/A	5 October 1963
Starring Ron Moody, Bryan Pringle, Robert Raglan, Blake Butler, Trevor Peacock and Pat Coombs.
19	3	"Fools Rush In"	Exists	TR16	12 October 1963
Starring Deryck Guyler, Gordon Rollings and Patrick Newell.
20	4	"Shamrot"	Missing	N/A	19 October 1963
Starring Dermot Kelly, Kathleen Harrison, Arthur Mullard, Thomas Baptiste, Tony Doyle and Alan Simpson.
21	5	"The Bachelor Girls"	Missing	N/A	26 October 1963
Starring Tracy Reed, Anna Palk, Edward Fox, André Maranne and Terence De Marney.
22	6	"The Plan"	Missing	N/A	2 November 1963
Starring Peter Cushing, P.G. Stephens, Graham Stark, Francis Matthews, Jim McManus, David Davies and Stuart Saunders.
23	7	"A Picture of Innocence"	Missing	N/A	9 November 1963
Starring Patricia Burke, Frederick Peisley, Charles Lloyd Pack, Frank Pettitt and Harry Littlewood.
24	8	"Nicked at the Bottle"	Missing	N/A	16 November 1963
Starring George Cole, Margaretta Scott, Doris Hare, James Villiers, Peter Stephens and Richard McNeff.
25	9	"The Chars"	Missing	N/A	23 November 1963
Starring Elsie Waters, Doris Waters, Michael Balfour, Ann Lancaster, James Beck and Derek Nimmo.
26	10	"Comrades in Arms"	Missing	N/A	30 November 1963
Starring Ian Bannen, Fenella Fielding, Graham Stark and Elvi Hale.
27	11	"The Walrus and the Carpenter"	Missing	N/A	14 December 1963
Starring Hugh Griffith, Felix Aylmer and Doris Hare.
28	12	"The Bed"	Exists	TR35	28 December 1963
Starring Thora Hird, Freddie Frinton and Brian Oulton.
29	13	"The Mate Market"	Exists	TR16	3 January 1964
Starring Lance Percival, Francesca Annis, Richard Caldicot, Dilys Laye, Jeremy Young and Jean Conroy.
30	14	"The Hen House"	Missing	N/A	10 January 1964
Starring Beryl Reid, Barbara Windsor and Dermot Kelly, Madeleine Mills and Graham Weston.
31	15	"The Siege of Sydney's Street"	Exists	TR16	17 January 1964
Starring Roy Kinnear, Gordon Rollings, George Benson, Arthur Mullard, Eric Dodson Barbara Keogh and Peter Thomas.
32	16	"The Mascot"	Missing	N/A	24 January 1964
Starring Dudley Foster, Robert Dorning and Joe Gladwin.
33	17	"Good Luck Sir, You've Got a Lucky Face"	Missing	N/A	31 January 1964
Starring Graham Stark, Derek Francis and Frank Thornton.

=== Series 4 (1965) ===
No. overall	No. in series	Title	Archival Status	Media	Original release date
34	1	"Barnaby Spoot and the Exploding Whoopee Cushion"	Missing	N/A	28 May 1965
Starring John Bird, John Le Mesurier, Ronald Lacey, Sheila Steafel, Alister Williamson, Bart Allison, Bill Burridge and Sidney Johnson.
35	2	"Mother Came Too"	Missing	N/A	5 June 1965
Starring Peggy Mount and Graham Stark.
36	3	"Here I Come Whoever I Am"	Missing	N/A	11 June 1965
Starring Bernard Cribbins, Helen Fraser, Mike Pratt, Edward Evans and Maureen Lane.
37	4	"Happy Family"	Missing	N/A	18 June 1965
Starring Ted Ray, Daphne Anderson and Judy Geeson.
38	5	"Memoirs of a Chaise Longue"	Missing	N/A	2 July 1965
Starring John Le Mesurier, Betty Marsden, Fenella Fielding, Jack Watling and Shay Gorman.
39	6	"Murray and Me"	Missing	N/A	8 July 1965
Starring Chic Murray, Alan Baulche and Harry Locke.
40	7	"Hudd"	Missing	N/A	15 July 1965
Starring Roy Hudd and Noel Dyson.
41	8	"Till Death Us Do Part"	Partial	TR16 SEQ	22 July 1965
Starring Warren Mitchell, Gretchen Franklin, Anthony Booth, Una Stubbs, Derek Nimmo, Eric Dodson and Colin Welland.
42	9	"The Time and the Motion Man"	Missing	N/A	29 July 1965 (Note: This episode was originally scheduled to air on 25 June 1965, but was replaced by Compact, which was moved from its usal time slot by a special United Nations anniversary programme.)
Starring Leslie Phillips and Richard Moore.
43	10	"Sam and the Samaritan"	Missing	N/A	5 August 1965
Starring Wilfrid Brambell, John Junkin, Roy Kinnear and John Scott Martin.
44	11	"The Vital Spark"	Missing	N/A	12 August 1965
Starring Roddy McMillan, John Grieve and Robert Urquhart.
45	12	"Betsy Mae"	Missing	N/A	19 August 1965
Starring Hermione Gingold, Nicholas Phipps and Michael Gover.

=== Series 5 (1966) ===
No. overall	No. in series	Title	Archival Status	Media	Original release date
46	1	"The Bishop Rides Again"	Exists	TR16	17 May 1966
Starring Robertson Hare, William Mervyn, Derek Nimmo, John Barron, James Beck and Cheryl Molineaux.
47	2	"Beggar My Neighbour"	Missing	N/A	24 May 1966
Starring Reg Varney, Peter Jones, June Whitfield and Pat Coombs.
48	3	"A Little Learning"	Missing	N/A	31 May 1966
Starring Jack Hulbert, Cicely Courtneidge and Clive Morton.
49	4	"Judgement Day for Elijah Jones"	Missing	N/A	7 June 1966
Starring Clive Dunn, Bernard Cribbins, Derek Martin and Peter Diamond.
50	5	"Room at the Bottom"	Missing	N/A	14 June 1966
Starring Kenneth Connor, Deryck Guyler, Francis Matthews, Brian Wilde, Erik Chitty and Godfrey James.
51	6	"The End of the Tunnel"	Missing	N/A	21 June 1966
Starring George Cole, Lynn Redgrave, Tenniel Evans and Michael Spice.
52	7	"Seven Year Hitch"	Missing	N/A	28 June 1966
Starring Harry H. Corbett, Joan Sims and John Baskcomb.
53	8	"The Mallard Imaginaire"	Missing	N/A	5 July 1966
Starring Robert Coote, Moira Lister, Daphne Anderson and Arthur Howard.
54	9	"The Reluctant Romeo"	Missing	N/A	2 August 1966
Starring Leslie Crowther, Amanda Barrie, Keith Pyott and Sheila Steafel.

=== Series 6 (1967) ===
No. overall	No. in series	Title	Archival Status	Media	Original release date
55	1	"Hughie"	Missing	N/A	19 May 1967
Starring Hugh Lloyd, Patrick Cargill and Michael Sheard.
56	2	"House in a Tree"	Missing	N/A	26 May 1967
Starring Wendy Craig, Paul Daneman, Roberta Tovey and Kenneth Thornett.
57	3	"Spanner in the Works"	Missing	N/A	2 June 1967
Starring Jimmy Jewel, Norman Rossington, Julian Holloway, Arnold Peters, Eric Dodson, Jon Rollason, Peter Bathurst, Blake Butler and Colin Douglas.
58	4	"Heirs on a Shoestring"	Missing	N/A	9 June 1967
Starring Jimmy Edwards, Clive Dunn, Sam Kydd, Frances Bennett and Eileen Way.
59	5	"Uncle Fred Flits By"	Missing	N/A	16 June 1967
Starring Wilfrid Hyde-White, Ballard Berkeley, Gordon Rollings and Richard McNeff.
60	6	"Loitering With Intent"	Missing	N/A	23 June 1967
Starring Daphne Anderson, David Tomlinson, Rudolph Walker, John Nettleton, Barry Fantoni and Madeleine Mills.
61	7	"To Lucifer: A Son"	Missing	N/A	29 June 1967
Starring John Le Mesurier, Jimmy Tarbuck, Pat Coombs and Gábor Baraker.
62	8	"The Old Campaigner"	Exists	TR16	30 June 1967
Starring Terry-Thomas, Derek Fowlds, Norman Claridge, Brian Cullingford, Susan Jameson and André Maranne.

=== Series 7 (1968) ===
No. overall	No. in series	Title	Archival Status	Media	Original release date
63	1	"State of the Union"	Missing	N/A	26 April 1968
Starring Les Dawson, Patsy Rowlands, Michael Robbins, Melvyn Hayes, Edward Evans and Roma Tomelty.
64	2	"View By Appointment"	Missing	N/A	3 May 1968
Starring Beryl Reid, Hugh Paddick, Derek Fowlds, Pauline Collins and John Harvey.
65	3	"The Family of Fred"	Missing	N/A	10 May 1968
Starring Freddie Frinton, Jean Kent, Roberta Rex and Mike Lucas.
66	4	"Stiff Upper Lip"	Missing	N/A	17 May 1968
Starring Richard Vernon, Michael Bates, Bernard Bresslaw, George Baker, John Glyn-Jones and Robert Lee.
67	5	"Wild, Wild Woman"	Missing	N/A	24 May 1968
Starring Barbara Windsor, Derek Francis, Penelope Keith and Colette Gleeson.
68	6	"Thank You Sir, Thank You Madam"	Partial	TR16 SEQ	31 May 1968
Starring David Lodge, Peter Glaze, Gordon Rollings, John Grieve and Veronica Clifford.
69	7	"B-And-B"	Exists	TR16	7 June 1968
Starring Bernard Braden, Barbara Kelly, Kim Braden and Pauline Collins.
70	8	"Me Mammy"	Missing	N/A	14 June 1968
Starring Milo O'Shea, Yootha Joyce and Neil Hallett.
71	9	"The Gold Watch Club"	Missing	N/A	28 June 1968
Starring Dennis Price, Peter Bayliss, Bob Todd, Derek Waring, Barbara Leake, Roger Avon and Norman Mitchell.
NB	NB	"Current Affairs"	Missing	N/A	Untransmitted
Starring Harold Goodwin, Arthur White, Kenneth Fortescue, Ken Parry, Robert Dorning, Damaris Hayman and Bruce Wightman.

=== Series 8 (1969) ===
No. overall	No. in series	Title	Archival Status	Media	Original release date
72	1	"The Liver Birds"	Missing	N/A	14 April 1969
Starring Pauline Collins, Polly James, Roy Marsden and Hugh Walter.
73	2	"The Valley Express"	Missing	N/A	21 April 1969
Starring Nerys Hughes, Graeme Garden, Richard Davies and James Appleby.
74	3	"Tooth and Claw"	Missing	N/A	28 April 1969
Starring Warren Mitchell, Marty Feldman, Richard Caldicot, Anthony Dawes, Arnold Diamond, David Rowlands and Harry Brooks Jr.
75	4	"As Good Cooks Go"	Missing	N/A	5 May 1969
Starring Tessie O'Shea, Robert Dorning, James Appleby, Norman Chappell and Brian Grellis.
76	5	"The Loves of Larch Hill"	Missing	N/A	12 May 1969
Starring Robert Dorning, Gillian Blake and Denis Cleary.
77	6	"The Making of Peregrine"	Missing	N/A	19 May 1969
Starring Dick Emery, Pat Coombs, Andrew Ray and Sam Kydd.
78	7	"Up Pompeii!"	Exists	VT625	17 September 1969
Starring Frankie Howerd, Max Adrian, John Junkin, Aubrey Woods and Richard McNeff.

=== Series 9 (1969-70) ===
No. overall	No. in series	Title	Archival Status	Media	Original release date
79	1	"Joint Account"	Missing	N/A	19 December 1969
Starring Keith Barron, Sarah Atkinson and Geoffrey Whitehead.
80	2	"The Jugg Brothers"	Missing	N/A	1 January 1970
Starring Bob Grant, Stephen Lewis, Fanny Carby and Queenie Watts.
81	3	"An Officer and a Gentleman"	Missing	N/A	8 January 1970
Starring James Grout, Ken Wynne, Patricia Hayes, Diana King and Raymond Westwell.
82	4	"Who's Your Friend?"	Missing	N/A	15 January 1970
Starring Bernard Cribbins, Maggie Fitzgibbon and Frank Thornton.

=== Series 10 (1970) ===
No. overall	No. in series	Title	Archival Status	Media	Original release date
83	1	"Keep 'Em Rolling"	Missing	N/A	11 March 1970
Starring Derek Nimmo, Timothy Bateson, Gordon Rollings, Michael Collins and Peter Diamond.
84	2	"Better Than a Man"	Missing	N/A	18 March 1970
Starring Sheila Hancock, Leslie Sands, Willoughby Goddard and Bartlett Mullins.
85	3	"Last Tribute"	Exists	TR16	25 March 1970
Starring Bill Fraser and Raymond Huntley.
86	4	"Haven of Rest"	Missing	N/A	1 April 1970
Starring Ballard Berkeley, Deryck Guyler, John Le Mesurier, Colin Gordon and Vivienne Bennett.
87	5	"Mind Your Own Business"	Missing	N/A	8 July 1970
Starring Norman Bird, Hilda Fenemore, Derek Griffiths, Tony Selby and Cheryl Hall.
88	6	"The Old Contemptible"	Missing	N/A	15 July 1970
Starring Arthur English, Gretchen Franklin, John Sharp, Michael Osborne, Derrick Gilbert and Kenneth Thornett.
89	7	"Don't Ring Us...We'll Ring You"	Missing	N/A	29 July 1970
Starring John Junkin, Norman Rossington, Colin Welland and Barbara Knox.
90	8	"Meter Maids"	Missing	N/A	5 August 1970
Starring Pat Coombs, Joan Sanderson, Barbara Windsor, Martin Wyldeck and Robert Lankesheer.

=== Series 11 (1971) ===
No. overall	No. in series	Title	Archival Status	Media	Original release date
91	1	"Just Harry and Me"	Missing	N/A	1 April 1971
Starring Sheila Hancock, Donald Houston and Lynne Frederick.
92	2	"Uncle Tulip"	Missing	N/A	8 April 1971
Starring Geoffrey Lumsden, Renu Setna, Sahab Qazalbash and Madhav Sharma.
93	3	"It's Awfully Bad for Your Eyes, Darling..."	Missing	N/A	15 April 1971
Starring Joanna Lumley, Jane Carr and Anna Palk.
94	4	"The Rough with the Smooth"	Exists	VT625	22 April 1971
Starring Tim Brooke-Taylor, John Junkin, Jenny Till, Timothy Carlton, Clovissa Newcombe, Terence Brook and Richard McNeff.
95	5	"Equal Partners"	Missing	N/A	29 April 1971
Starring Nicky Henson and Angela Scoular.
96	6	"The Importance of Being Hairy"	Missing	N/A	6 May 1971
Starring John Cater, James Copeland, Gerald Flood, Gilly Flower and David Simeon.

=== Series 12 (1972) ===
No. overall	No. in series	Title	Archival Status	Media	Original release date
97	1	"Idle at Work"	Missing	N/A	14 January 1972
Starring Ronnie Barker, Graham Crowden, Derek Francis, Mary Merall, William Kendall, Roland MacLeod, Angela Leventon, Timothy Carlton, Desmond Cullum-Jones and John Owens.
98	2	"And Who's Side Are You On?"	Missing	N/A	21 January 1972
Starring Patrick Newell, Tim Barrett, Freddie Earlle, Terence Edmond, John Hollis, Olivia Breeze, Laurie Webb, Roy Evans and Derek Chafer.
99	3	"Born Every Minute"	Exists	VT625	28 January 1972
Starring Ronald Fraser, James Beck, Juliet Harmer, Campbell Singer, Mollie Sugden, Harry Landis and Gordon Peters.
100	4	"The Dirtiest Soldier in the World"	Exists	VT625	27 March 1972
Starring John Standing, Freddie Earlle, Jack Watson, Moray Watson, Allan Cuthbertson, Ben Aris, Andrew Downie, Jay Neill and Ricky Newby.
101	5	"No Peace on the Western Front"	Exists	VT625	30 August 1972
Starring Ronald Fraser and Warren Mitchell.
102	6	"Weren't You Marcia Honeywell?"	Missing	N/A	7 September 1972
Starring Hilda Fennemore, Jo Garrity, Betty Marsden, Hugh Paddick and Royce Mills.
103	7	"Are You Being Served?"	Exists	TR16	8 September 1972
Starring Frank Thornton, Mollie Sugden, John Inman, Trevor Bannister, Wendy Richard, Arthur Brough, Nicholas Smith and Larry Martyn.

=== Series 13 (1973-4) ===
No. overall	No. in series	Title	Archival Status	Media	Original release date
104	1	"Of Funerals and Fish"	Exists	VT625	4 January 1973
Starring Bill Owen, Peter Sallis, Michael Bates, Jane Freeman, John Comer and Kathy Staff.
105	2	"The Rescue"	Exists	TR16	11 January 1973
Starring Moyra Fraser, Peter Jones, Lucita Lijertwood and Nicholas Parsons.
106	3	"Elementary, My Dear Watson"	Exists	VT625	18 January 1973
Starring John Cleese, Willie Rushton, Bill Maynard, Josephine Tewson, Norman Bird, Larry Martyn, Michael Gover, Ivor Salter, Gordon Faith, Dawn Addams and John Carson.
107	4	"The Birthday"	Exists	VT625	25 January 1973
Starring Gordon Peters, Frank Thornton, Bill Pertwee, Mary Millar and Edward Evans.
108	5	"Marry the Girls"	Missing	N/A	1 February 1973
Starring John Le Mesurier, Barbara Murray, Sally Thomsett, David Simeon and John Leeson.
109	6	"Home From Home"	Exists	TR16	8 February 1973
Starring Carmel McSharry, Michael Robbins, Yootha Joyce, Tony Selby and Olive Mercer.

=== Series 14 (1974) ===
No. overall	No. in series	Title	Archival Status	Media	Original release date
111	1	"No Strings"	Exists	VT625	16 April 1974
Starring Keith Barron and Rita Tushingham.
112	2	"Franklyn and Johnnie"	Missing	N/A	23 April 1974
Starring Geoffrey Bayldon, Ronnie Barker, Richard Hurndall, Sydney Bromley and Hugh Morton.
113	3	"Howerd's History of England"	Missing	N/A	30 April 1974
Starring Frankie Howerd, Patrick Newell, Cyril Appleton and Patrick Holt.
114	4	"Happy Ever After"	Exists	VT625	7 May 1974
Starring Terry Scott, June Whitfield, Paul Greenwood, Dave Carter and Philip Ryan.
115	5	"The Dobson Donut"	Missing	N/A	14 May 1974
Starring Milo O'Shea, Bernard Spear, Jo Kendall, Brian Miller, John Ringham and Ken Barker.
116	6	"The Big Job"	Exists	VT625	21 May 1974
Starring Prunella Scales, Peter Jones, Alfred Marks, Andonia Katsaros, Nick Brimble and Aubrey Woods.
117	7	"It's Only Me"	Missing	N/A	28 May 1974
Starring David Jason, Patricia Hayes, Daphne Heard, Olive Mercer, Edward Burnham, Paul Greenwood, Adrienne Burgess and Bernard Spear.
118	8	"The Last Man on Earth"	Exists	VT625	4 June 1974
Starring Ronald Fraser and Dandy Nichols.
119	9	"Sitting Pretty"	Missing	N/A	11 June 1974
Starring Nicky Henson, Una Stubbs and James Cossins.
120	10	"Pygmalion Smith"	Exists	VT625	25 June 1974
Starring Leonard Rossiter and T.P. McKenna.
121	11	"A Girl's Best Friend"	Missing	N/A	3 July 1974
Starring Zena Walker, Reginald Marsh, Carolyn Courage and David Knight.
122	12	"The Reverend Wooing of Archibald"	Missing	N/A	9 July 1974
Starring Joan Benham, Julian Holloway, William Mervyn, Madeline Smith, John Leeson and Julian Fox.
123	13	"Too Much Monkey Business"	Missing	N/A	12 December 1974
Starring Norman Rossington, Pat Heywood, George Innes, John Ringham and Harold Goodwin.
NB	NB	"French Relish"	Missing	N/A	Untransmitted
Starring Derek Nimmo.
NB	NB	"Bird Alone"	Missing	N/A	Untransmitted
Starring Liz Smith and Yootha Joyce.

=== Series 15 (1975) ===
No. overall	No. in series	Title	Archival Status	Media	Original release date
124	1	"The Melting Pot"	Exists	DV	11 June 1975
Starring Spike Milligan, John Bird, Peter Jones, Frank Carson, Harry Fowler, Alister Williamson and Freddie Earlle.
125	2	"Only on Sunday"	Missing	N/A	18 June 1975
Starring Trevor Bannister and Peter Bowles.
126	3	"For Richer...For Poorer"	Missing	N/A	25 June 1975
Starring David Battley, Harry H. Corbett, Don Henderson and Eric Pohlmann.
127	4	"Captive Audience"	Missing	N/A	2 July 1975
Starring Derek Fowlds, Daphne Heard, Leslie Dwyer, Cheryl Hall and Leon Vitali.
128	5	"Going, Going, Gone...Free?"	Exists	VT625	9 July 1975
Starring Pauline Yates, Geoffrey Palmer and Peter Duncan.

== Revived series ==
=== Series 16 (2014) ===
No. overall	No. in series	Title	Original release date
129	1	"Over to Bill"	29 April 2014
Starring Shai Ahmed, James Baxter, Hugh Dennis, Neil Morrissey and Tracy-Ann Oberman.
130	2	"Miller's Mountain"	6 May 2014
Starring Jimmy Chisholm, Kevin Guthrie, Kathryn Howden, Sheila Reid and Sharon Rooney.
131	3	"Monks"	13 May 2014
Starring Seann Walsh, James Fleet, Mark Heap, Justin Edwards, Fergus Craig and Angus Deayton.

=== Series 17 (2016) ===
No. overall	No. in series	Title	Original release date
132	1	"Hospital People"	26 February 2016
Starring Tom Binns, Amit Shah, Janine Duvitski and Mandeep Dhillon.
133	2	"Broken Biscuits"	4 March 2016
Starring Alison Steadman, Stephanie Cole, Timothy West, Lisa Millet, Alun Armstrong, Brian Compton, Warren Brown and Gemma Whelan.
134	3	"Stop / Start"	11 March 2016
Starring Jack Docherty, Kerry Godliman, Nigel Havers, Laura Aikman, Sarah Hadland and John Thomson.

=== Series 18 (2017) ===
No. overall	No. in series	Title	Original release date
135	1	"Tim Vine Travels Through Time"	1 September 2017
Starring Tim Vine, Ore Oduba, Sally Phillips, Tim Key, Spencer Jones, Mandeep Dhillon and Marek Larwood.
136	2	"Mister Winner"	8 September 2017
Starring Spencer Jones, Aimee-Ffion Edwards, Dorothy Atkinson, Shaun Williamson, Romesh Ranganathan and Shobu Kapoor.
137	3	"Static"	15 September 2017
Starring Rob Beckett, Alison Steadman, Phil Davis, Samson Kayo, Jacqueline Chan and Chrissie Cotterill.

== Scottish Comedy Playhouse ==
The BBC aired six comedy pilots in 1970 in Scotland only under the title Scottish Comedy Playhouse, none of which developed into a full series. While these were being aired, Monty Python's Flying Circus was broadcast in the rest of the UK. All episodes from this series were wiped soon after transmission and are currently missing from the archives. The episodes are as follows:

No. overall	No. in series	Title	Archival Status	Media	Original release date
1	1	"Stand-In For a Hearse"	Missing	N/A	22 September 1970
2	2	"The Siege of Castle Drumlie"	Missing	N/A	29 September 1970
3	3	"The Dinner Party"	Missing	N/A	20 October 1970
4	4	"To Gracie a Son"	Missing	N/A	28 October 1970
5	5	"Stobo Takes The Chair"	Missing	N/A	3 November 1970
6	6	"Made in Heaven"	Missing	N/A	10 November 1970

== Reception ==
=== Critical response ===
Jon E. Lewis and Penny Stempel described Comedy Playhouse as a series of "comedy playlets" that "launched numerous influential sitcoms", its survival depending on a kind of audience‑driven "natural selection".

== See also ==
- Galton and Simpson Comedy - a six-part anthology series of stories written by Ray Galton and Alan Simpson, produced by London Weekend Television, that aired on the ITV network in 1969
- Six Dates with Barker - a six-part anthology series featuring sitcom pilots starring Ronnie Barker, produced by London Weekend Television, that aired on the ITV network in 1971.
- The Comedy Game - an Australian sitcom anthology series that aired on ABC between 1971 and 1973.
- Seven of One - a seven-part anthology series featuring sitcom pilots starring Ronnie Barker that aired on BBC2 in 1973.
- Cilla's Comedy Six - an anthology series of comedic stories starring Cilla Black, produced by ATV, that aired on the ITV network between 1975 and 1976.
- The Sound of Laughter - a six-part anthology series of sitcom pilots produced by ATV, that aired on the ITV network in 1977.
- The Galton and Simpson Playhouse - a seven-part anthology series of sitcom pilots written by Ray Galton and Alan Simpson, produced by Yorkshire Television, that aired on the ITV network in 1977.
- The Comic Strip Presents... - an anthology series of one-off comedic stories that aired on Channel 4 and BBC2 between 1982 and 2016.
- Murder Most Horrid - a black comedy anthology series featuring comedic stories starring Dawn French, that aired on BBC2 between 1991 and 1999.
- ITV Comedy Playhouse - an eight-part anthology series of sitcom pilots produced by Carlton Television that aired on the ITV network in 1993.
- Paul Merton in Galton and Simpson's... – an anthology series of comedic stories starring Paul Merton, based on scripts by Ray Galton and Alan Simpson, produced by Central Television that aired on the ITV network between 1996 and 1997.
