= All Gas and Gaiters =

British TV sitcom (1966–1971)

- Genre: Sitcom
- Created by: Pauline Devaney; Edwin Apps
- Starring: Robertson Hare; William Mervyn; Derek Nimmo; John Barron; Ernest Clark
- Country of origin: United Kingdom
- Original language: English
- No. of series: 5
- No. of episodes: 33 + 1 short

Production
- Running time: 30 minutes

Original release
- Network: BBC1
- Release: 17 May 1966 – 17 June 1971

All Gas and Gaiters is a British television ecclesiastical sitcom which aired on BBC1 from 1966 to 1971. It was written by Pauline Devaney and Edwin Apps, a husband-and-wife team who used the pseudonym of John Wraith when writing the pilot. All Gas and Gaiters was also broadcast on BBC Radio from 1971 to 1972.

== Cast ==
- William Mervyn – The Rt Revd Dr Cuthbert Hever, DD, Bishop of St Ogg's
- Robertson Hare – The Ven Henry Blunt, the archdeacon
- Derek Nimmo – The Revd Mervyn Noote, the bishop's chaplain
- John Barron – The Very Revd Lionel Pugh-Critchley, Dean of St Ogg's (pilot, series 1, 4 and 5)
- Ernest Clark – The Very Revd Lionel Pugh-Critchley, Dean of St Ogg's (series 2 and 3, 1968 special)
- Ruth Kettlewell – Mrs Grace Pugh-Critchley, the Dean's wife (series 1–3, 1968 special)
- Joan Sanderson – Mrs Grace Pugh-Critchley, the Dean's wife (series 4–5)

== Setting ==
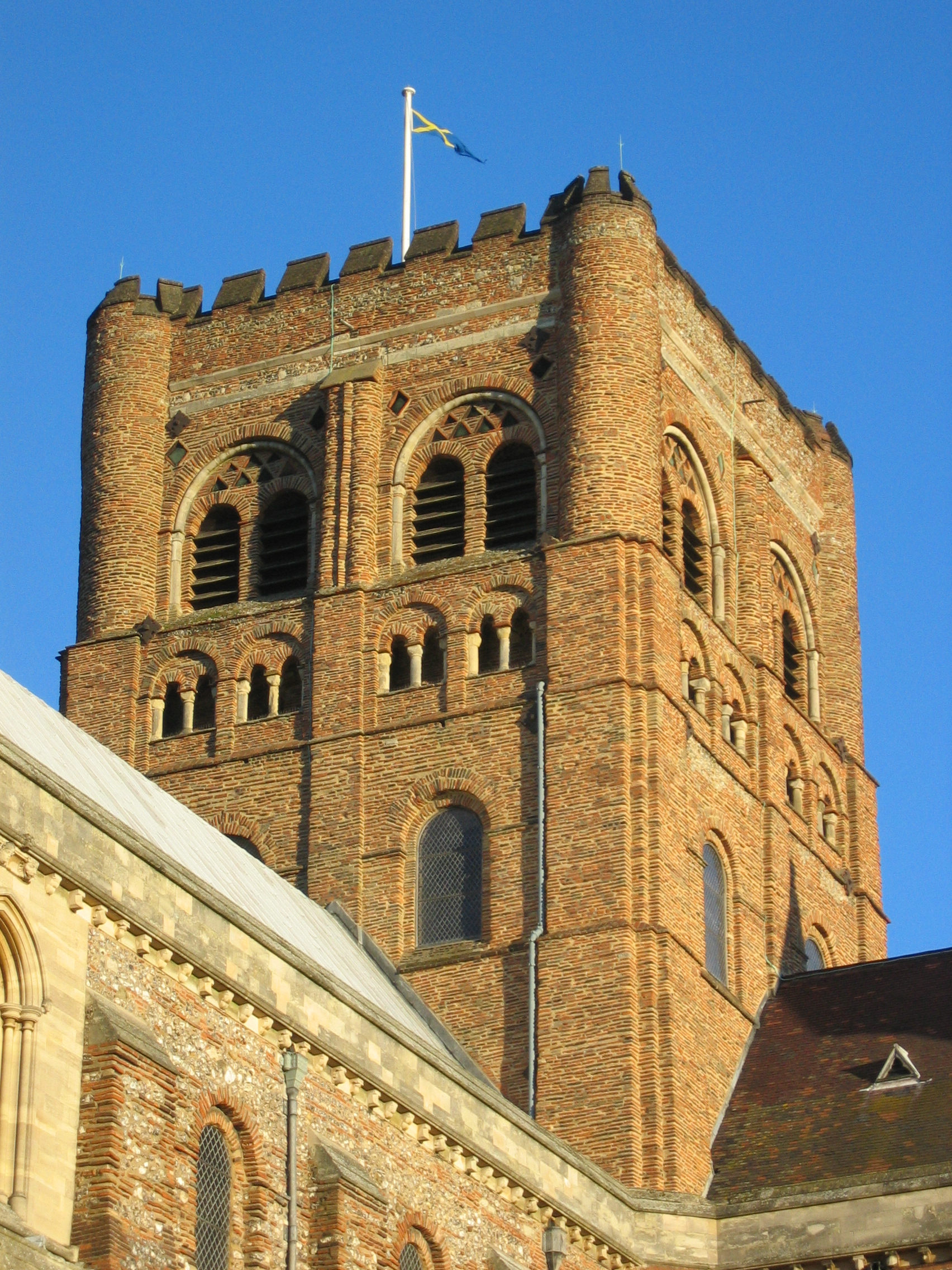
St Albans Cathedral

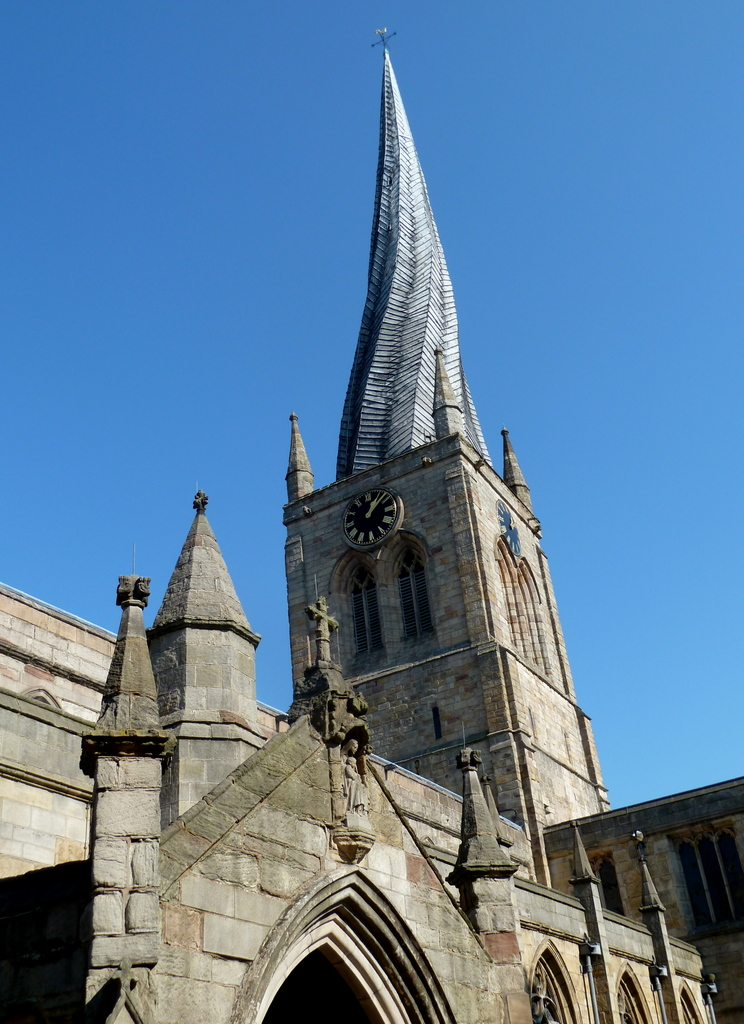
St Mary and All Saints, Chesterfield

The fictional St Ogg's Cathedral is represented in the opening titles by a composite image of St Albans Cathedral topped with the crooked spire of St Mary and All Saints, Chesterfield

All Gas and Gaiters, predominantly farcical in nature, is set in the close of the fictional St Ogg's Cathedral and concerns intrigues and rivalries among the clergy in the Church of England. The bishop is easygoing; his friend the archdeacon is elderly, tippling, and still appreciative of attractive women; and the bishop's chaplain is naïve and accident-prone. Their wish to live a quiet bachelor life is continually threatened by the overbearing dean, who tries to bring by-the-book rule to the cathedral, and by the dean's strident wife.

The title derives from the comic expression "all is gas and gaiters" (meaning "all is well"), uttered by an eccentric old gentleman clad in small-clothes and grey worsted stockings in Charles Dickens's 1839 novel Nicholas Nickleby, and later used by such writers as P. G. Wodehouse, Agatha Christie, and Powell and Pressburger (spoken in the film The Life and Death of Colonel Blimp). The phrase "all gas and gaiters" has had different meanings. Sometimes it has been used to mean "a satisfactory state of affairs" and sometimes it has had the meaning of "nonsense". The relevance of this phrase to Anglican clergy is that gaiters (worn over shoes) were part of the traditional dress of bishops and archdeacons.

The series initially aroused some controversy because of its portrayal of senior clergy as bungling incompetents, although some clergy enjoyed it. In the opening credits, St Albans Cathedral was shown as the fictional St Ogg's (but with the Crooked Spire of Church of St Mary and All Saints, Chesterfield added to the central tower). The background to the opening credits was actually the headmaster's garden of St Albans School. The name "St Ogg's" may have been taken from a fictional village in George Eliot's novel The Mill on the Floss.

The theme music was composed by Stanley Myers.

The series was the first of a number of comedies starring Derek Nimmo in similar bumbling clerical roles – Oh, Brother!, Oh, Father! and Hell's Bells – but is regarded as the best, partly because of a strong supporting cast (particularly the experienced farceur Robertson Hare as the archdeacon) and partly because it included some elements of gentle satire.

== Episodes ==
The pilot and first two series were videotaped in black-and-white. The third series was videotaped in colour, but was originally broadcast in monochrome. The fourth and fifth series were made and shown in colour.

=== Comedy Playhouse Pilot ===
The pilot episode was chosen to be the opening episode of the fifth series of Comedy Playhouse, the BBC's long-running comedy strand that showcased one-off potential sitcom pilots. The pilot episode received favourable reviews from the press and gained more viewers than all the episodes in the preceding series of the show. The BBC quickly commissioned Devaney and Apps to write six more episodes, which were taped in the studio later that year. Previously thought missing from the archives, the pilot was recovered in 2001 and received its first public screening at the BFI's annual Missing Believed Wiped event at the National Film Theatre on 20 October 2001.

No. overall	No. in series	Title	Archival Status	Original release date
1	1	"The Bishop Rides Again"	Exists	17 May 1966
Pilot episode as part of Comedy Playhouse. Previously lost; the episode was found in 2001. Guest star; James Beck.

=== Series 1 (1967) ===
Initially only one episode The Bishop Gets the Sack was thought to have survived from this series. However, in 2001, two episodes were returned to the BBC archive following their Treasure Hunt campaign; when the series' creators Pauline Devaney and Edwin Apps returned film copies of the following episodes The Bishop Rides Again and The Bishop Sees a Ghost, since they personally requested copies of two episodes from BBC at the time, when they were trying to sell the series to the US.

No. overall	No. in series	Title	Archival Status	Original release date
2	1	"The Bishop Gets the Sack"	Exists	31 January 1967
Guest star: John Le Mesurier.
3	2	"The Bishop Meets a Bird"	Missing	7 February 1967
Guest star: Barbara Keogh.
4	3	"The Bishop Writes a Sermon"	Missing	14 February 1967
Guest star: Blake Butler.
5	4	"The Bishop Sees a Ghost"	Exists (Note: Previously lost; the episode was found in 2001, along with Comedy Playhouse pilot.)	21 February 1967
Guest starring: Joe Gladwin and Patrick Newell.
6	5	"The Bishop Turns to Crime"	Missing	28 February 1967
Guest starring: Jack Haig and Jerold Wells.
7	6	"Only Three Can Play"	Missing	7 March 1967
Guest star: Ursula Howells.

=== Series 2 (1967) ===
The role of The Dean was recast in this series with Ernest Clark, who would go on to play the character for the next two series. Due to the BBC's wiping policy at the time, no episodes featuring Clark are known to have survived.

No. overall	No. in series	Title	Archival Status	Original release date
8	1	"The Dean Goes Primitive"	Missing	24 November 1967
Guest star: Ingrid Sylvester.
9	2	"The Bishop Gives a Party"	Missing	1 December 1967
Guest starring: Helen Cherry and Nan Munro.
10	3	"The Bishop Gets a Letter"	Missing	8 December 1967
Guest star: Clifford Parish.
11	4	"The Bishop Goes to Town"	Missing	15 December 1967
Guest star: Ballard Berkeley.
12	5	"Give a Dog a Bad Name"	Missing	22 December 1967
Guest star: Janina Faye.
13	6	"The Bishop Gives a Shove"	Missing	29 December 1967
Guest star: Frank Williams.

=== Short Insert: Christmas Night With The Stars (1968) ===
Christmas Night with the Stars was a programme screened annually on Christmas night, when the top stars of the BBC appeared in short versions of their programmes, typically five to ten minutes long. All Gas and Gaiters appeared in a cross-over sketch with the sitcom Oh, Brother! where Nimmo also played Father Dominic. In this sketch, Nimmo plays both roles as Noote and Dominic respectively. This sketch no longer exists in the BBC's film and videotape archives.

No. overall	No. in series	Title	Archival Status	Original release date
S	S	"Special"	Missing (Note: An audio recording exists, but the program itself is missing.)	25 December 1968
A specially shot insert as part of that year's edition of Christmas Night with the Stars. Guest starring: Felix Aylmer, Patrick McAlinney and Derek Francis.

=== Series 3 (1969) ===
From this series onwards, the show was taped in colour, although originally transmitted in black and white, as BBC1 was still transmitting in monochrome at the time. Colour transmissions began later that year, commencing on 15 November 1969.

No. overall	No. in series	Title	Archival Status	Original release date
14	1	"The Bishop Learns the Facts"	Missing	8 January 1969
Guest starring: Brenda Cowling and Stephanie Heesom.
15	2	"The Bishop Has a Flutter"	Missing	15 January 1969
Guest starring: Ballard Berkeley, George Betton and Ronnie Brody.
16	3	"The Bishop is Hospitable"	Missing	22 January 1969
Guest star: Tania Robinson.
17	4	"The Bishop Pays a Visit"	Missing	29 January 1969
Guest star: n/a.
18	5	"The Bishop Takes a Holiday"	Missing	5 February 1969
Guest starring: Frederick Peisley, Marjorie Rhodes, Peter Blair-Stewart and Ann Way.
19	6	"The Affair at Cookham Lock"	Missing	12 February 1969
Guest star: Tony Handy.
20	7	"The Bishop Keeps His Diary"	Missing	19 February 1969
Guest star: n/a.

=== Series 4 (1970) ===
The first series to be transmitted in colour, even though it had been produced in colour since Series 3. There were cast changes to the principal roles in this series, John Barron reprised his role as The Dean and the role of his wife Mrs Grace Pugh-Critichley was recast with Joan Sanderson, who would go on to play the character for the remainder of the series' run.

No. overall	No. in series	Title	Archival Status	Original release date
21	1	"The Bishop Buys a Car"	Missing	15 April 1970
Guest starring: John Lawrence and Cy Town.
22	2	"The Bishop Gains a Reputation"	Missing	22 April 1970
Guest star: Anthony Sharp.
23	3	"The Bishop Loves His Neighbour"	Exists	29 April 1970
Guest star: Peter West.
24	4	"The Bishop Beats the System"	Exists	6 May 1970
Guest starring: Roy Kinnear and John Quayle.
25	5	"The Bishop Buys a Mug"	Missing	13 May 1970
Guest star: Richard Caldicot.
26	6	"When in Rome"	Missing	20 May 1970
Guest star: n/a.
27	7	"The Bishop Takes Up Business"	Missing	27 May 1970
Guest star: Blake Butler.

=== Series 5 (1971) ===
The final series, was also the only series with all the episodes to exist in their entirety, although the master copies of the original 2" colour VT's for the first two episodes of this series are currently missing and only 16mm black and white film recordings are known to have survived.

No. overall	No. in series	Title	Archival Status	Original release date
28	1	"The Bishop Warms Up"	Exists (Note: This episode exists as a 16mm black-and-white film print, although it was originally taped on 2" Colour VT.)	13 May 1971
Guest starring: Norman Chappell, Frank Williams and Dudley Jones.
29	2	"The Bishop Entertains"	Exists (Note: This episode exists as a 16mm black-and-white film print, although it was originally taped on 2" Colour VT.)	20 May 1971
Guest starring: Allan Cuthbertson, Brenda Cowling and Betty Huntley-Wright.
30	3	"The Bishop Gives a Present"	Exists	27 May 1971
Guest star: n/a.
31	4	"The Bishop Shows His Loyalty"	Exists	3 June 1971
Guest star: n/a.
32	5	"The Bishop Has a Rest"	Exists	10 June 1971
Guest star: n/a.
33	6	"The Bishop Loses His Chaplain"	Exists	17 June 1971
Guest starring: Penny Spencer and Michael Stainton.

== Radio ==
A radio version of All Gas and Gaiters was broadcast on BBC Radio 4 from 5 January 1971 to 4 December 1972 for 33 episodes. The radio show used the same cast as the television series with the exception of Derek Nimmo, who left after the first series and was succeeded by Jonathan Cecil. Although seven radio episodes were thought to have been wiped, these were later found and all are available through radio enthusiasts. Some episodes were rebroadcast on BBC 7 in October and November 2006, and again a year later and in early 2009. They continued to be broadcast on the station, now renamed BBC Radio 4 Extra, in August 2011 and again in early 2017, 2022 and 2025.

=== Series 1 (1971) ===
No. overall	No. in series	Title	Original release date
1	1	"The Bishop Rides Again"	5 January 1971
2	2	"The Bishop Writes a Sermon"	12 January 1971
3	3	"The Bishop Meets a Bird"	19 January 1971
4	4	"The Bishop Turns to Crime"	26 January 1971
5	5	"The Bishop Sees a Ghost"	2 February 1971
6	6	"Only Three Can Play"	9 February 1971
7	7	"The Dean Goes Primitive"	16 February 1971
8	8	"The Bishop Gets a Letter"	23 February 1971
9	9	"The Bishop Gives a Party"	2 March 1971
10	10	"The Bishop Goes to Town"	9 March 1971
11	11	"Give a Dog a Bad Name"	16 March 1971
12	12	"The Bishop Gives a Shove"	23 March 1971
13	13	"The Bishop Pays a Visit"	30 March 1971

=== Series 2 (1972) ===
No. overall	No. in series	Title	Original release date
14	1	"The Bishop Learns the Facts"	24 July 1972
15	2	"The Bishop Takes a Holiday"	31 July 1972
16	3	"The Bishop Buys a Car"	7 August 1972
17	4	"The Bishop Gets the Sack"	14 August 1972
18	5	"The Bishop Has a Flutter"	21 August 1972
19	6	"The Affair at Cookham Lock"	28 August 1972
20	7	"The Bishop Loves His Neighbour"	4 September 1972
21	8	"The Bishop Beats the System"	11 September 1972
22	9	"The Bishop Entertains"	18 September 1972
23	10	"The Bishop Gains a Reputation"	25 September 1972
24	11	"The Bishop Buys a Mug"	2 October 1972
25	12	"The Bishop Loses His Chaplain"	9 October 1972
26	13	"When In Rome"	16 October 1972
27	14	"The Bishop Is Hospitable"	23 October 1972
28	15	"The Bishop Gives a Present"	30 October 1972
29	16	"The Bishop Takes Up Business"	6 November 1972
30	17	"The Bishop Keeps His Diary"	13 November 1972
31	18	"The Bishop Warms Up"	20 November 1972
32	19	"The Bishop Shows His Loyalty"	27 November 1972
33	20	"The Bishop Has a Rest"	4 December 1972

== Archive Status ==
Only 11 television episodes still exist in the archive, the others were wiped as was the standard policy of the BBC in this era. Film recordings exist for the pilot and two episodes from series 1, and two of the colour episodes from series 5 are preserved as black and white 16mm film recordings only. Only six colour episodes are preserved in their original colour videotape format.

Eight scripts of the lost episodes were published in 2015: "Only Three Can Play", "The Dean Goes Primitive", "The Bishop Goes To Town", "The Bishop Learns the Facts", "The Bishop is Hospitable", "The Bishop Takes a Holiday", "The Affair at Cookham Lock" and "The Bishop Gives a Shove".

== Home media ==
All 11 surviving episodes were originally released on VHS and DVD by DD Home Entertainment on 3 November 2003, originally accompanied by a detailed behind-the-scenes booklet, written by Andy Priestner in consultation with the show's writers, Edwin Apps and Pauline Devaney, but later released without. Simply Media later gained the rights to the distribution of the series, and it re-released on 24 August 2009.

== Influence and legacy ==
In April 2016, the radio drama based on the story behind the making of the series, All Mouth and Trousers by Mark Burgess, was aired by BBC Radio 4. The production featured John Sessions as Frank Muir, Nicholas Boulton as Stuart Allen, Gareth Williams as William Mervyn, Trevor Littledale as Robertson Hare, Zeb Soanes as Derek Nimmo and David Collings as John Barron.

== See also ==
British sitcom
