= The Ghost Talks =

The Ghost Talks may refer to:

- The Ghost Talks (1929 film), a 1929 comedy, directed by Lewis Seiler
- The Ghost Talks (1949 film), a Three Stooges short
- "The Ghost Talks" (Randall and Hopkirk Deceased), an episode of Randall and Hopkirk (Deceased)
