= Whack-O! =

British TV series 1956–1960 and 1971–1972

- The title sequence emulated a chalk blackboard, with caricatures of Jimmy Edwards interposed with credits, often with letters the wrong way around.
- Genre: Sitcom
- Created by: Frank Muir; Denis Norden
- Starring: Jimmy Edwards; Arthur Howard (series 1–7); Julian Orchard (series 8); Kenneth Cope; Norman Bird; John Stirling; Peter Glaze; Edwin Apps (series 1–7); Peter Greene (series 8); David Langford; Keith Smith; Brian Rawlinson; Gordon Phillot (series 1–7); Harold Bennett (series 8); Frank Raymond; Gary Warren (series 8); Greg Smith (series 8)
- Country of origin: United Kingdom
- Original language: English
- No. of episodes: 60

Production
- Running time: 30 minutes

Original release
- Network: BBC1
- Release: 4 October 1956 – 26 February 1972

Whack-O! is a British sitcom starring Jimmy Edwards. It was written by Frank Muir and Denis Norden.

The series (in black and white) ran on the BBC from 1956 to 1960 and (in colour) from 1971 to 1972. Edwards took the part of Professor James Edwards, M.A., the drunken, gambling, devious, cane-swishing headmaster who tyrannised staff and children at Chiselbury public school (described in the opening titles as "for the sons of Gentlefolk"). The Edwards character bore more than a passing resemblance to Sergeant Bilko as he tried to swindle the children out of their pocket money to finance his many schemes.

The first six episodes were subtitled "Six of the Best". In 1959 a film was made based on the show, called Bottoms Up!. The series was revived in colour with updated scripts in 1971–72, retitled Whacko!. In all, it ran for a total of 60 episodes, with 47 of black-and-white and 13 colour, of 30 minutes each. There were three special shorts. There was also a radio version with Vera Lynn starring as herself in the second episode. Many of these radio episodes were recovered by a BBC archivist from a listener's collection of tapes in 2012.

The front of the historic house of Great Fosters near Egham in Surrey was used in the opening title sequence of the TV comedy series, behind the name of the fictional Chiselbury School.

== Cast ==
- Professor James Edwards played by Jimmy Edwards
- Mr Oliver Pettigrew played by Arthur Howard in 1956–60 and Julian Orchard in 1971
- Mr F.D. Price Whittaker played by Kenneth Cope
- Mr S.A. Smallpiece played by Norman Bird
- Lumley (a pupil) played by John Stirling
- Mr R.P. Tench played by Peter Glaze
- Mr Halliforth played by Edwin Apps in 1956–60 and Peter Greene in 1971
- Parker played by David Langford
- Mr Forbes played by Keith Smith
- Mr Proctor played by Brian Rawlinson
- Mr Dinwiddie played by Gordon Phillot in 1956–60 and Harold Bennett in 1971
- Mr Cope-Willoughby played by Frank Raymond
- Matron played by Barbra Archer, Liz Fraser and by Charlotte Mitchell
- Taplow played by Gary Warren in 1971
- Potter played by Greg Smith in 1971
- Proctor played by John Clegg
- Clodagh Rodgers appeared as herself during the colour series in 1972
- Max Bygraves appeared as himself in one episode in 1960
- Vera Lynn appeared in one episode in 1959

== Surviving episodes ==
Most of the show's episodes are missing, presumed lost. Six of the original black-and-white episodes are known to exist today.

Only 6 episodes of the B/W version exist in the BBC TV archives, with 3 (out of the 6 remaining B&W episodes) having been rediscovered in December 2016.

- Series 3 episode 5 (21 October 1958)
- Series 5 episode 4 (1 December 1959)
- Series 6 episode 4 (3 June 1960)
- Series 7 episode 1 (22 November 1960)
- Series 7 episode 5 (20 December 1960)

== Details of radio adaptation ==
BBC Radio adapted the TV scripts into 45 thirty-minute shows, mostly with the original cast, of which 42 recordings survive. There were three series which originally ran on the BBC Light Programme from 23 May 1961 until 22 July 1963. They have been repeated on BBC Radio 4 Extra since 2015 and the last airing was in 2023.

- Audio Download and Streaming
- Dates of Airings

== See also ==
- British sitcom
- List of films based on British sitcoms
