= Sheila Hancock =

English actress, singer, and author (born 1933)

Dame Sheila Hancock DBE
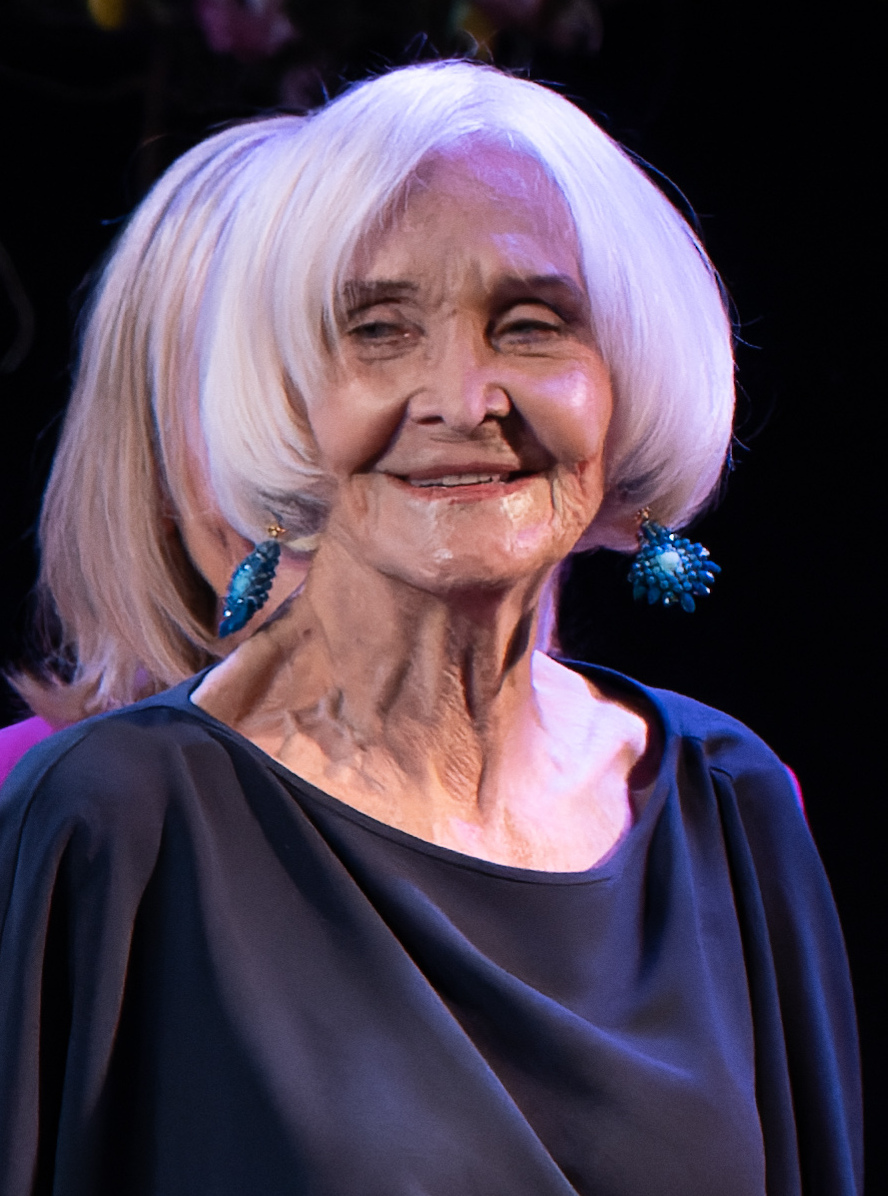
- Hancock in 2023
- Born: Sheila Cameron Hancock; 22 February 1933 (age 93); Blackgang, Isle of Wight, England
- Education: Royal Academy of Dramatic Art
- Occupations: Actress; singer; author; theatre director
- Years active: 1953–present
- Spouses: Alec Ross (m. 1955; died 1971); John Thaw (m. 1973; died 2002)
- Children: 2
- Relatives: Abigail Thaw (stepdaughter)

Dame Sheila Cameron Hancock (born 22 February 1933) is an English actress, singer, and author. She has performed on stage in both plays and musicals in London theatres, and is also known for her roles in films and on television.

Hancock’s Broadway debut in Entertaining Mr. Sloane (1966) earned her a Tony Award nomination for Best Lead Actress in a Play. She won a Laurence Olivier Award for Best Performance in a Supporting Role in a Musical for her role in Cabaret (2007), and was nominated at the Laurence Olivier Awards five other times for her work in Annie (1978), Sweeney Todd (1980), The Winter's Tale (1982), Prin (1989), and Sister Act (2010).

In film and television, Hancock’s credits include Carry On Cleo (1964), The Wildcats of St Trinian's (1980), Buster (1988), Three Men and a Little Lady (1990), The Boy in the Striped Pyjamas (2008), and Edie (2017). She was twice nominated for the British Academy Television Award for Best Actress, for The Russian Bride (2001) and Bedtime (2002).

== Early life and education ==
Sheila Cameron Hancock was born on 22 February 1933 in Blackgang on the Isle of Wight, the daughter of Enrico Cameron Hancock and Ivy Louise (née Woodward). Her sister Billie was seven years older. After Enrico and Ivy left the hospitality industry in 1938, the Hancocks moved to a semi-detached house in Latham Road, Bexleyheath, which Hancock considered dull compared to "the rough and tumble" of King's Cross. She later recalled that there was a sense that "we had definitely gone up in the world... became lower-middle-class".

Hancock was educated at St Etheldreda's Convent in Ely Place, Holborn, then at Upton Road Junior School and Upland Junior School. After wartime evacuation to Wallingford, Oxfordshire (at that time in Berkshire), and to Crewkerne, Somerset, Hancock attended Dartford County Grammar School.

Hancock furthered her acting education at the Royal Academy of Dramatic Art (RADA), graduating in 1952 with an Acting (RADA) Diploma.

== Theatre ==
Hancock worked in repertory during the 1950s and made her West End debut in 1958, replacing Joan Sims in the play Breath of Spring. She then appeared in Joan Littlewood's Theatre Workshop production of Make Me An Offer in 1959, and her other early West End appearances included Peter Cook's revue One Over the Eight with Kenneth Williams in 1961, and starring in Rattle of a Simple Man in 1962. She recalled that in One over the Eight she had been egged on by Irving Davies's exhortation as dance captain, "Eyes, teeth, and tits, darlings – and sparkle, sparkle, sparkle!"

In 1965, Hancock made her Broadway debut in Entertaining Mr Sloane. In 1978, she played Miss Hannigan in the original London cast of the musical Annie at the Victoria Palace Theatre and two years later, she played Mrs Lovett in the original London production of the musical Sweeney Todd at the Theatre Royal, Drury Lane; her portrayal was described as having "caught the love-story element perfectly."

Hancock has appeared in The Winter's Tale, Titus Andronicus and A Delicate Balance for the Royal Shakespeare Company (RSC). At the National Theatre she has appeared in Neil Bartlett's In Extremis/ De Profundis, The Cherry Orchard and The Duchess of Malfi. She was also the first woman director of the RSC touring company, directing A Midsummer Night's Dream and was the first woman to direct in the Olivier Theatre at the National Theatre with The Critic. She was also associate artistic director of the Cambridge Theatre Company.

Hancock took the role of Rose in the West Yorkshire Playhouse's 1993 production of Gypsy; a reviewer commented that she "certainly had the measure of Rose... 'Everything's coming up roses' brought the first hint of true pathos into the show", while in the final scene "her wild fluctuations between self-belief and self-doubt ended in tear-jerking self-awareness".

In 2006, Hancock played the role of Fräulein Schneider in the West End revival of the musical Cabaret at the Lyric Theatre. She won the Laurence Olivier Award, and the Clarence Derwent Award, for Best Performance in a Supporting Role in a Musical. In 2009, she spent over a year playing Mother Superior in Sister Act the Musical at the London Palladium for which she was nominated for an Olivier Award.

In 2013, Hancock starred alongside Lee Evans and Keeley Hawes in the comedy Barking in Essex at Wyndham's Theatre.

In 2016, Hancock starred with Jenna Russell in the UK premiere of the musical Grey Gardens at Southwark Playhouse. In 2018, she played Maude in Harold and Maude at the Charing Cross Theatre, London. In 2019, Hancock starred in the musical This Is My Family at the Minerva Theatre, Chichester.

== Television ==
Hancock's first big television role was as Carole Taylor in the BBC sitcom The Rag Trade in the early 1960s. She also played the lead roles in the sitcoms The Bed-Sit Girl, Mr Digby Darling and Now Take My Wife. Her other television credits include Doctor Who (playing a parody of Margaret Thatcher in The Happiness Patrol), Kavanagh QC (opposite her husband, John Thaw), Gone to the Dogs, Brighton Belles, EastEnders, The Russian Bride, Bedtime, Fortysomething, Feather Boy, Bleak House, New Tricks, Hustle and The Catherine Tate Show. In 2008, she played the part of a terminally ill patient who travelled to Switzerland for an assisted suicide in one of The Last Word monologues for the BBC, in a role that was written especially for her by Hugo Blick. In 2009, she played Liz in The Rain Has Stopped, the first episode of the BBC anthology series Moving On.

Hancock has also presented several documentaries. In 2010, she presented Suffragette City (part of A History of the World series), telling the story of the suffragette movement through objects from the Museum of London's collection. In 2011, she presented Sheila Hancock Brushes Up: The Art of Watercolours, exploring the history of watercolour via beautiful yet little-known works of professional and amateur artists. In 2013 she presented, as part of the ITV Perspectives documentary series, Perspectives: Sheila Hancock – The Brilliant Brontë Sisters, examining the writers' upbringing and the sources of their inspiration.

In December 2012, Hancock took part in a Christmas special edition of the BBC programme Strictly Come Dancing.

In January 2016, Hancock made a guest appearance in an episode of the BBC medical drama Casualty for its 30th anniversary. From December 2016 until its conclusion in January 2019, she starred alongside Dawn French, Emilia Fox and Iain Glen in all three seasons of the Sky One comedy drama series Delicious.

In January 2017, Hancock made a guest appearance in an episode of the Inspector Morse prequel Endeavour alongside her stepdaughter Abigail Thaw.

In 2020, Hancock co-presented Great Canal Journeys for Channel 4 with Gyles Brandreth, with whom she had previously appeared on Celebrity Gogglebox. In 2021, she appeared in more Great Canal Journeys as well as the Sky One fantasy drama A Discovery of Witches as Goody Alsop, and as Eileen in ITV's Unforgotten.

In 2023, Hancock played Liz Zettl in the BBC true-life crime drama miniseries The Sixth Commandment.

== Other work ==
In March 1963, Hancock made a comedy single record, "My Last Cigarette". The song is about someone trying to give up smoking; however, every good intention is dependent on her having "just one more cigarette".

In 1980, she appeared in the movie The Wildcats of St Trinian's which she called "one of the worst films ever made".

Hancock regularly works in radio. She has been a semi-regular contestant on the BBC Radio 4 panel game Just a Minute since 1967. She starred as Alice Foster in the BBC Radio 2 comedy series Thank You, Mrs Fothergill, in 1978–79, alongside Pat Coombs. In 1995, Hancock provided the voice of Granny Weatherwax in BBC Radio 4's adaptation of Terry Pratchett's Discworld novel Wyrd Sisters. In 2011, Hancock appeared in the BBC Radio 4 series North by Northamptonshire, alongside Geoffrey Palmer.

Hancock has made guest appearances on television shows such as Grumpy Old Women, Room 101, Have I Got News for You and Would I Lie To You?. From March to May 2010, she appeared as a judge on the BBC show Over the Rainbow, along with Charlotte Church, Andrew Lloyd Webber and John Partridge.

From 2007 to 2012, Hancock was chancellor of the University of Portsmouth.

Hancock was the subject of the biographical television series This Is Your Life in 1977, when she was surprised by Eamonn Andrews at the curtain call of the play The Bed Before Yesterday at the Lyric Theatre, London.

== Honours and awards ==
Hancock was appointed Officer of the Order of the British Empire (OBE) in the 1974 Birthday Honours, Commander of the Order of the British Empire (CBE) in the 2011 New Year Honours and Dame Commander of the Order of the British Empire (DBE) in the 2021 New Year Honours for services to drama and charity.

In 2007, Hancock was appointed as the Chancellor of the University of Portsmouth.

In 2010, she was awarded the Lifetime Achievement Award at the Women in Film and Television Awards.

She was twice nominated for the British Academy Television Award for Best Actress, for The Russian Bride (2001) and Bedtime (2002).

| Year | Work | Awards | Category | Result | Ref. |
|---|---|---|---|---|---|
| 1966 | Entertaining Mr Sloane | Tony Awards | Best Actress in a Play | Nominated | |
| 1978 | Annie | Laurence Olivier Awards | Best Comedy Performance | Nominated | |
| 1980 | Sweeney Todd | Laurence Olivier Awards | Best Actress in a Musical | Nominated | |
| 1982 | The Winter's Tale | Laurence Olivier Awards | Best Actress in a Supporting Role | Nominated | |
| 1990 | Prin | Laurence Olivier Awards | Actress of the Year | Nominated | |
| 2002 | The Russian Bride | British Academy Television Awards | Best Actress | Nominated | |
| 2003 | Bedtime | British Academy Television Awards | Best Actress | Nominated | |
| 2007 | Cabaret | Laurence Olivier Awards | Best Performance in a Supporting Role in a Musical | Won | |
| 2010 | Sister Act | Laurence Olivier Awards | Best Performance in a Supporting Role in a Musical | Nominated | |

== Personal life ==
Hancock was married to actor Alec Ross from 1955 until his death from oesophageal cancer in 1971. They had one daughter, Melanie, born in 1964. In 1973, Hancock married actor John Thaw. He adopted Melanie and they had another daughter, Joanna Thaw. Thaw's daughter Abigail, from his first marriage, also joined their family. All three of their daughters have become actresses.

Hancock was married to Thaw until his death (also from oesophageal cancer) on 21 February 2002. Hancock herself was diagnosed with breast cancer in 1988, but made a full recovery. Her 2004 book, The Two of Us, is a dual biography, which gives accounts of both their lives, as well as focusing on their 28-year marriage. This was followed by the 2008 book Just Me, an autobiographical account of coming to terms with widowhood, and Old Rage in 2022. In 2014, she published her debut novel, Miss Carter's War. Hancock had published the memoir Ramblings of an Actress in 1987.

Hancock is a member of the Religious Society of Friends (Quakers). She is a patron of educational charity Digismart as well as a trustee of the John Thaw Foundation.

Hancock is a friend of Sandi Toksvig and read Maya Angelou's poem "Touched by an Angel" at the "I Do To Equal Marriage" event in 2014 that celebrated the introduction of same-sex marriage in England and Wales.

== Filmography ==
=== Film ===
| Year | Title | Role | Notes |
|---|---|---|---|
| 1960 | Light Up the Sky! | Theatre Act | |
| 1960 | The Bulldog Breed | Doris | Uncredited |
| 1960 | Doctor in Love | Librarian | Uncredited |
| 1961 | The Girl on the Boat | Jane Hubbard | |
| 1962 | Twice Round the Daffodils | Dora | |
| 1964 | Night Must Fall | Dora Parkoe | |
| 1964 | The Moon-Spinners | Cynthia Gamble | |
| 1964 | Carry On Cleo | Senna Pod | |
| 1967 | How I Won the War | Mrs Clapper's Friend | |
| 1968 | The Anniversary | Karen Taggart | |
| 1970 | Take a Girl Like You | Martha Thompson | |
| 1980 | The Wildcats of St Trinian's | Olga Vandemeer | |
| 1987 | Maiking Waves | Doris | Short film |
| 1988 | Hawks | Regina | |
| 1988 | Buster | Mrs Rothery | |
| 1988 | The Universe of Dermot Finn | Mother of Pearl | Short film |
| 1990 | Three Men and a Little Lady | Vera | |
| 1994 | A Business Affair | Judith | |
| 1997 | Love and Death on Long Island | Mrs. Barker | |
| 1999 | Hold Back the Night | Vera | |
| 2004 | Yes | Aunt | |
| 2008 | The Boy in the Striped Pyjamas | Grandma | |
| 2013 | Delicious | Patti | |
| 2017 | Edie | Edie | |
| 2017 | The Dark Mile | Mary | |
| 2018 | The More You Ignore Me | Nan Wildgoose | |
| 2019 | From This Day Forward | Her | Short film |
| 2026 | Frank and Percy † | | Post-production |

=== Television (partial) ===
| Year | Title | Role | Notes |
|---|---|---|---|
| 1960 | Bootsie and Snudge | Greta | Episode: "Bootsie's Punctured Romance" |
| 1960 | BBC Sunday-Night Play | Janet | Episode: " Doctor in the House" |
| 1961–1962 | The Rag Trade | Carole Taylor | 12 episodes |
| 1963 | BBC Sunday-Night Play | Jackie Lambert | Episode: "June Fall" |
| 1964 | Festival | Winifred | Episode: "Say Nothing" |
| 1964 | Thursday Theatre | Olive Leech | Episode: "Summer of the Seventeenth Doll" |
| 1965 | ITV Play of the Week | Hety | Episode: "A Fearful Thing" |
| 1965 | The Wednesday Thriller | Joyce Lambert | Episode: "The Regulator" |
| 1966 | The Bed-Sit Girl | Sheila Ross | 12 episodes |
| 1966 | Thirty-Minute Theatre | Cynthia / Vi | 2 episodes |
| 1966–1981 | Jackanory | Storyteller | 15 episodes |
| 1967 | Armchair Theatre | Alice | Episode: "Compensation Alice" |
| 1967 | Life with Cooper | Lady Stuck in Railings | 1 episode |
| 1968 | ITV Playhouse | Naomi Woodley | Episode: "Horizontal Hold" |
| 1968 | ITV Playhouse | Kaff | Episode: "Entertaining Mr Sloane" |
| 1968 | Release | Mrs Caudle | Episode: "Mrs. Caudle's Curtain Lectures " |
| 1968 | Detective | Mrs Markle | Episode: "Born Victim" |
| 1969 | All Star Comedy Carnival | Thelma Teesdale | |
| 1969–1971 | Mr Digby Darling | Thelma Teesdale | 19 episodes |
| 1970 | The Mating Machine | Freda | Episode: "Sealed with a Loving Kiss" |
| 1970 | Comedy Playhouse | Wendy Hillbright | Episode: "Better Than a Man" |
| 1971 | Comedy Playhouse | Claire Love | Episode: "Just Harry and Me" |
| 1971 | Shadows of Fear | Anne Brand | Episode: "Sugar and Spice" |
| 1971 | Now Take My Wife | Claire Love | 14 episodes |
| 1972 | Scoop | Mrs Stitch | 3 episodes |
| 1974 | Whodunnit? | panelist | Episode: "It's Quicker By Train" |
| 1982 | Play for Today | Ellen | Episode: "The Remainder Man" |
| 1985 | Dramarama | Rita Chartell | Episode: "The Audition" |
| 1985 | The Daughter-in-Law | Mrs Gascoigne | |
| 1985 | Home to Roost | Sue Willows | Episode: "The Way We Were" |
| 1988 | Doctor Who | Helen A. | Serial: The Happiness Patrol |
| 1989 | Theatre Night | Mrs Malaprop | Episode: "The Rivals" |
| 1991 | Gone to the Dogs | Jean | 4 episodes |
| 1992 | Gone to Seed | Mag Plant | |
| 1993–1994 | The Brighton Belles | Frances | All 11 episodes |
| 1993 | The World of Peter Rabbit and Friends | Anna Maria | Episode: "The Tale of Samuel Whiskers or The Roly-Poly Pudding" |
| 1995 | The Buccaneers | Duchess of Trevenick | 5 episodes |
| 1995 | Dangerous Lady | Sarah Ryan | All 4 episodes |
| 1997 | Kavanagh QC | Sarah Meadows | Episode: "Blood Money" |
| 1998 | Close Relations | Dorothy | All 5 episodes |
| 1999 | Alice in Wonderland | Cook | TV film |
| 2000 | The Thing About Vince... | Pat | All 3 episodes |
| 2000–2001 | EastEnders | Barbara | 3 episodes |
| 2000, 2025, 2026 | Have I Got News For You | Herself | Panelist on Ian's team; 3 episodes; series 19, 70 and 71; oldest panelist ever |
| 2001 | The Russian Bride | Dora Blossom | TV film |
| 2001 | The Practicality of Magnolia | Isobel | TV film |
| 2001–2003 | Bedtime | Alice Oldfield | All 15 episodes |
| 2002 | Bait | Pam Raeburn | TV film |
| 2003 | Fortysomething | Gwendolen Hartley | All 6 episodes |
| 2004 | Feather Boy | Edith Sorrel | All 6 episodes |
| 2005 | Bleak House | Mrs. Guppy | 2 episodes |
| 2006 | The Catherine Tate Show | June | Episode: "Lauren Gets Hitched" |
| 2006 | After Thomas | Granny Pat | TV film |
| 2007 | Fallen Angel | Lady Youlgreave | 2 episodes |
| 2007–2011 | New Tricks | Grace Pullman | 4 episodes |
| 2009 | Moving On | Liz | Episode: "he Rain Has Stopped" |
| 2011 | Just Henry | Gran | TV film |
| 2012 | Hustle | Dolly Hammond | Episode: "Picasso Finger Painting" |
| 2012 | Playhouse Presents | Melba | Episode: "Nellie and Melba" |
| 2014 | Remember Me | Loveday Hutton | Episode: #1.3 |
| 2015 | Toast of London | Sheila Hancock | Episode: "Global Warming" |
| 2016 | Casualty | Hester Price | Episode: "A Life Less Ordinary" |
| 2016 | The Dumping Ground | Doris | Episode: "Doris" |
| 2016–2019 | Delicious | Mimi Vincent | 12 episodes |
| 2017 | Endeavour | Dowsable Chattox | Episode: "Harvest" |
| 2018 | Urban Myths | Gala Dalí | Episode: "The Dalí and the Cooper" |
| 2020 | Housebound | Audrey | 3 episodes |
| 2021 | A Discovery of Witches | Goody Alsop | 5 episodes |
| 2021 | Unforgotten | Eileen Baildon | 5 episodes |
| 2023 | The Sixth Commandment | Liz Zettl | 4 episodes |
