= Wacky Wales =

- The Goodies episode
- Episode no.: Series 5 Episode 4
- Original air date: 3 March 1975

Guest appearances
- Jon Pertwee as Reverend Llewellyn Llewellyn Llewellyn Llewellyn; Marcelle Samett as Fan Dancer; Alun Williams as himself / Compere of the Ecclesiastical Sevens Rugby Games; The Fred Tomlinson Singers as Welsh Druid Rugby Players

Episode chronology
← Previous "Chubbie Chumps"	Next → "Frankenfido"

"Wacky Wales" is an episode of the British comedy television series The Goodies.

This episode is also known as "Welsh Rugby".

Written by The Goodies, with songs and music by Bill Oddie.

== Plot ==
The Goodies receive an invitation from the Reverend Llewellyn Llewellyn Llewellyn Llewellyn to attend an Eisteddfod in Llan Dlubber in Wales. Tim is excited by this; the others less so. Despite this, Graeme gets his computer to create a traditional folk song. Tim declares it to be rubbish, provoking Bill's retort: "It's good enough for the Taffy Druids, isn't it?" Tim takes offence to this, warning Bill that Welsh people are very sensitive - "if you annoy them, they break your fingers!"

When they meet the Reverend, they find that he is amazed that the Goodies want to eat and drink tea, etc. He tells them that eating, drinking tea, and other such activities are sinful. The Reverend is with the Church of the Seventh Day Repressionists, and the church has disallowed anything that could even be remotely construed as fun: "You'll catch none of us committing one... of the 9,764 deadly sins!"

When the Goodies comment on the fun there should be at the Eisteddfod, the Reverend says that the Eisteddfod is the International Festival of Gloom, stating: "Enjoyment? There's no enjoyment at the eisteddfod. 'Eisteddfod' is an old Welsh word, you see, from the Old Welsh — 'Eistedd' meaning 'bored', and 'fod' meaning 'stiff'". The Reverend suggests the Goodies go to bed early, after a nice brisk rub down with a Brillo Pad.

At this point, Bill is ready to leave and go home. Graeme, however, decides that the Goodies should stay, and remain as competitors in the Eisteddfod, and to be as entertaining as possible. As a consequence, they put on an enthusiastic display of entertainment, and they bring down the wrath of the Reverend on their heads. The Reverend decides to sacrifice the Goodies.

Before he sacrifices the Goodies, he leads his congregation in a devotional song, which just happens to be a well-known rugby song. The Goodies, recognising the song, throw themselves into singing in full voice. This surprises the Reverend. When the Goodies press this temporary advantage by pretending to be Welsh, the Reverend declares that he can't kill fellow Welshmen, tells them that his church (revealed as "Welsh Druids") worships the game of rugby union, and invites the Goodies to join them. Tim declines on the basis that they are Church of England. The Reverend claims that his is the greatest religion, and Tim challenges him to prove it. This results in the "Ecclesiastical Rugby Sevens" competition, in which various teams made up from churchmen from religious groups play against each other (one of the Seven Rugby teams is made up entirely of Derek Nimmos, and the "Festival of Light" is dominated by Mary Whitehouse, who is amusingly brutal).

Eventually, the "Welsh Druids" win the tournament, and their celebrations are less than holy. Tim discovers that the Reverend has got half of the Welsh rugby national team who are not holy and they're playing with the "Druids", and he disqualifies the team because they had brought in non-religious players. The "Druids" take offence at being denied their rightful position as winners, and decide to use the Goodies as balls in a rough informal game of rugby. The trio eventually had enough and starts playing the game with their wits to outmatched the Welsh team from the streets and back the rugby. Finally Graeme uses a line-marking machine to make a trapdoor to dispose of them, leaving The Goodies to play the football to score a very easy winning try and conversion with no opposition.

== Cultural references ==
- Eisteddfod
- Rugby sevens
- The 'team of Derek Nimmos'
- Lord Snowdon — who is seen taking photographs
- Llanfairpwllgwyngyllgogerychwyrndrobwllllantysiliogogogoch, where a train's complete journey is from one end of the station's platform sign to the other

== Notes ==
- The part of the Reverend Llewellyn Llewellyn Llewellyn Llewellyn was played by Jon Pertwee, who also ad-libbed some of his lines during the episode. This happened because the Goodies kept taking away his pages of script, which Jon Pertwee had put around in order to remember his lines.
- Derek Nimmo was well known for playing various comic clerical roles on television - hence his 'Derek Nimmo team' being eligible to play in the "Ecclesiastical Rugby Sevens" competition.
