= Chubbie Chumps =

- The Goodies episode
- Episode no.: Series 5 Episode 3
- Original air date: 24 February 1975

Guest appearance
- Michael Aspel as Michael Aspirin

Episode chronology
← Previous "Clown Virus"	Next → "Wacky Wales"

"Chubbie Chumps" is an episode of the British comedy television series The Goodies.

This episode is also known as "Radio 2" and "The Beauty Contest" as well as "Housewives" and "Miss Housewife".

Written by The Goodies, with songs and music by Bill Oddie.

== Plot ==
Graeme and Bill return from their weekend fishing trip to discover that the office hasn't been cleaned and Tim has become obese through eating huge amounts of lard. Tim has also taken to listening to two radio shows, Jimmy Young's cooking show and a smooth talking Terry Wogan which as it turns out, is also listened to by a lot of housewives (all of whom have also become obese), and this leads the group (Tim included) to a health club, where they slim down again.

Meanwhile, Bill and Graeme are cleaning the office themselves, before Tim comes back from the health club. They find that Tim is slim again with a feminine look. He continues listening to the radio and Terry the disc jockey announces a beauty pageant for housewives, called Miss Housewife of the Year, on Friday night at the Royal Albert Hall. Tim enters the contest, but Graeme forbids him to go to the pageant because he's not a housewife - not even a miss - but it is no use. Tim walks off to make himself pretty for the pageant instead of listening to his friends due to the obvious reason, Tim has been brainwashed into naively. Graeme is left holding the telephone while Terry Wogan is still on the line and says "Hello, darling?". Graeme answers back "Don't you 'darling' me, mate!" and makes comments about the Terry's scheme for manipulating the housewives to enter his 'rotten contest'. Graeme forces the Terry into accidentally admitting that he doesn't want any fat women in the pageant, leading to him getting fired for making offensive and exclusionary comments while he's still live on air. Then, the BBC makes an announcement to hire a new disc jockey, Graeme has an idea to change the Beauty Pageant and takes the job.

Graeme becomes a radio announcer, and does all the voices of other disc jockeys. Bill tries to convince Tim that Graeme is on the radio and believes he's gone mad with power. Then, Bill hears about the prize money. Graeme makes further instructions to the housewives which make them fat again (Tim wants to also join in, but is prevented from doing so by Bill).

On Friday night at the Albert Hall, the beauty contest has started with Graeme welcoming all the obese housewives. The milkmen judges and other men are not impressed with them. Then Tim (Mrs. Cricklewood), who has stayed slim, becomes the winner of Housewife of the Year. Tim and Bill are happy to win the contest but Graeme is displeased with Bill's misunderstanding of his plan. The housewives become angry with the Goodies as they realise they've been duped and chase after them to get the prize cup. By the time the trio gets exhausted from running, they notice that the housewives have lost all their fat and become slim again while on the run, so the Goodies blow the dresses off the housewives (leaving them dressed in their underwear). Then the Goodies dressed as dirty old men chase all the housewives around the park.

== Cultural references ==
- Beauty contest
- Health club
- The Benny Hill Show — where the ending music and chase of the Benny Hill Show is used as the ending music and chase for the episode.
- ISIRTA chalked on the wall; this was the radio sketch show in which Bill, Tim and Graeme also starred. ISIRTA was the acronym frequently used for the full title of the radio series: I'm Sorry, I'll Read That Again.
- Terry Wogan The real life Disc Jockey of "fight the flab" radio campaign
- Jimmy Young The real life English singer and radio personality for "the cooking show"
