= The Two of Us: My Life with John Thaw =

The Two of Us: My Life with John Thaw (ISBN 1-58234-417-5) is a 2004 biography written by British actress Sheila Hancock. It is a double biography that focuses on the lives of both Sheila Hancock and her husband John Thaw (also an actor), and tells the story of their lives and their 28-year marriage.

Many of the early chapters are divided up fairly evenly, alternating between their separately developing careers and personal lives, before they eventually meet on the set of the play So What About Love? The text is also interlaced with entries from Sheila's diaries during the time leading up to and following John's death from cancer of the oesophagus in 2002, with the entries often having relevance to particular parts of the story.

Sheila talks openly about their life together, and the various problems that affected them both and almost destroyed their marriage on many occasions. Most prominent among these was John Thaw's depression and his long battle against alcoholism.
