= Oh, Brother! =

British TV sitcom (1968–1970)

- DVD cover
- Genre: Sitcom
- Written by: David Climie; Austin Steele
- Starring: Derek Nimmo; Felix Aylmer; Derek Francis
- Country of origin: United Kingdom
- Original language: English
- No. of series: 3
- No. of episodes: 19 + 1 short

Production
- Running time: 30 minutes

Original release
- Network: BBC1
- Release: 13 September 1968 – 27 February 1970

Related
- Oh, Father!

Oh, Brother! is a British television sitcom starring Derek Nimmo, which aired on BBC1 from September 13, 1968 to February 27, 1970.

== Synopsis ==
The series was set in the fictional Mountacres Monastery, with Nimmo cast as the well-meaning but inept novice Brother Dominic making life difficult for the Prior (Father Anselm, played by Felix Aylmer) and the Master of the Novices (Father Bernard, played by Derek Francis).

Nimmo was playing a very similar role in All Gas and Gaiters which ran from 1966 to 1971, the main difference being that Brother Dominic was working-class, whereas Nimmo's previous character, Rev. Mervyn Noote, had been upper-class.

== Cast ==
- Derek Nimmo — Brother Dominic
- Felix Aylmer — The Prior, Father Anselm
- Patrick McAlinney — Brother Patrick
- Derek Francis — Sub Prior, Father Matthew
- Edward Malin — Oldest Brother (Series 1-2)
- Colin Gordon — Master of Novices, Father Bernard (Series 1)
- Geoffrey Hibbert — Brother Francis (Series 1)
- John Grieve — Brother Joseph

== Reception ==
Oh, Brother! was not quite as successful or as affectionately remembered as All Gas and Gaiters, although it did last three series containing 19 episodes, only eight of which exist in the BBC archives. The comic potential in a monastery may have been rather limited, although it did benefit from a cast which included some experienced actors, particularly Nimmo himself and Felix Aylmer as Father Prior.

== Archive status ==
Due the BBC's wiping policy at the time, 11 episodes are currently missing from the archives. The episodes that currently survive consist of the 1st series episode The Voice of the Turtle and all the episodes from the 3rd series. Domestic audio recordings have been located from several missing episodes, and in 2020 a short clip from the missing episode In the Beginning was uncovered by Kaleidoscope. The clip featured in the Belgium television show "Ziet u er wat in" (Translation: Do You Like What You See?), which regularly featured short clips from British television programmes at the time including the likes of Sherlock Holmes, The Black and White Minstrel Show, The Good Old Days and The Wednesday Play.

== Episodes ==
=== Series 1 (1968) ===
No. overall	No. in series	Title	Archival Status	Original release date
1	1	"The Voice of the Turtle"	Exists	13 September 1968
2	2	"The House of Merchandise"	Missing	20 September 1968
3	3	"My Brother's Keeper"	Missing	27 September 1968
4	4	"The Sins of the Father"	Missing	4 October 1968
5	5	"The Root of All Evil"	Missing	11 October 1968
6	6	"Treasures on Earth"	Missing	18 October 1968

=== Short Insert: Christmas Night With The Stars (1968) ===
Christmas Night with the Stars was a programme screened annually on Christmas night that ran annually from 1958 to 1972. The programme consisted of appearances from the BBC's top stars of that time, whom appeared in short versions of their programmes, lasting usually between five and ten minutes long. Oh Brother! appeared in a cross-over sketch with the sitcom All Gas and Gaiters where Nimmo also played Rev. Mervyn Noote. In this sketch, Nimmo plays both roles as Noote and Dominic respectively. This sketch no longer exists in the BBC's film and videotape archives.

No. overall	No. in series	Title	Archival Status	Original release date
S	S	"Special"	Missing	25 December 1968

=== Series 2 (1969) ===
No. overall	No. in series	Title	Archival Status	Original release date
7	1	"A Goodly Inheritance"	Missing	11 April 1969
8	2	"Thine House in Order"	Missing	18 April 1969
9	3	"A Mother in Israel"	Missing	25 April 1969
10	4	"Behold This Dreamer"	Missing	2 May 1969
11	5	"An Uncertain Sound"	Missing	9 May 1969
12	6	"In the Beginning"	Missing	16 May 1969

=== Series 3 (1970) ===
No. overall	No. in series	Title	Archival Status	Original release date
13	1	"A Still Small Voice"	Exists	16 January 1970
14	2	"By The Fleshpots"	Exists	23 January 1970
15	3	"The Laughter of a Fool"	Exists	30 January 1970
16	4	"A Fool Returneth"	Exists	6 February 1970
17	5	"The Hands of Esau"	Exists	13 February 1970
18	6	"A Stone of Stumbling"	Exists	20 February 1970
19	7	"The Fullness of His Days"	Exists	27 February 1970

== Sequel series ==
Oh, Brother! was followed by a sequel Oh, Father! in 1973, also starring Nimmo and with the same writers. In this series, Dominic left the monastery and became a Roman Catholic priest. It had a supporting cast of Laurence Naismith, Pearl Hackney and David Kelly. This was not a success and only lasted a single series of seven episodes.

== DVD release ==
All the surviving episodes were released on a Region 2 DVD boxset on 8 November 2004. The follow-up series Oh, Father! was released on DVD on 24 October 2005.
