= Pauline Devaney =

British actress, writer and artist

- Born: 27 January 1937 (age 89); Stoke on Trent, Staffordshire, England
- Occupations: Actress, writer

Pauline Devaney (born 27 January 1937) is a British actress, writer, and artist, best known for her television writing in partnership with Edwin Apps. (Note: "About". Pauline Devaney.)

Devaney was born in Stoke-on-Trent, and trained at the Royal Academy of Dramatic Art. She and Apps both began their careers as actors but branched into screenwriting while between jobs, originally writing under the name "John Wraith", (Note: "All Gas and Gaiters". BBC. 2014-10-28.) with All Gas and Gaiters (1966–71), the series that brought Derek Nimmo into the public eye. The book All Gas and Gaiters: The Lost Episodes, published in June 2015 by Durpey-Allen, (ISBN 978-1-910317-02-0) is the first of four in which all the scripts of the wiped episodes of the first five series are published, together with Devaney's and Apps' memories of writing and producing television comedy decades earlier and, because Devaney was the first woman to ever do so, some of the difficulties they encountered with the hierarchy of the BBC.

Devaney appeared in leading roles on television during the 1960s, With Edwin Apps, she appeared in two comedy series by N. F. Simpson: Three Rousing Tinkles (1966) and Four Tall Tinkles (1967). During the 1980s, she wrote a one-woman stage play, To Marie with Love, based on the life of Marie Stopes, which she took to the Edinburgh Festival in 1985 where it won a Fringe First Award. There is a script of this play in the British Library and a sound recording of the original production in the National Archives. She toured extensively with ‘Marie’ both in the UK and abroad for a number of years.

Devaney began studying art in 1999. After winning the Winchester Art Competition in 2001, she took up art as a full-time career, and now lives in Lewes, Sussex.
