= Mr Digby Darling =

British television series

Mr Digby Darling is a British television sitcom made by Yorkshire Television and broadcast by ITV between 1969 and 1971, and starring Sheila Hancock and Peter Jones which ran for three series and 19 episodes.

== Production ==
The story centred on a fictional pest control business 'Rid-O-Rat'. Roland Digby (Peter Jones) is the assistant public relations officer who depends entirely on his secretary Thelma Teesdale (Sheila Hancock) to provide for his every need. This includes mending his clothes, cooking his meals, and generally covering up for his many failings at every opportunity. Comedienne and impressionist Janet Brown featured in the second and third series. It was a ratings hit, and was the fourth most watched television programme on British television by the second series.

== Episodes ==
=== Series One ===
1: Efficiency Expert (6 January 1969)

2: The Facts of Life (13 January 1969)

3: Holidays at Home (20 January 1969)

4: The New Secretary (27 January 1969)

5: The Mother-in-Law (3 February 1969)

6: Drunk and Disorderly (10 February 1969)

=== Series Two ===
7: Elementary, My Dear Thelma (27 October 1969)

8: Woman's Place...In The Office (3 November 1969)

9: Behind Every Man (11 November 1969)

10: The Man in Her Life (1 December 1969)

11: Last of the Big Spenders (8 December 1969)

12: Prime of Life (15 December 1969)

13: Festive Spirit (22 December 1969)

=== Series Three ===
14: Shake Up (21 December 1970)

15: Rats (28 December 1970)

16: Safe Breakers (4 January 1971)

17: Wives (11 January 1971)

18: Love (18 January 1971)

19: Contest (25 January 1971)
