= Alan MacNaughtan =

Scottish actor (1920–2002)

- in The Avengers episode, Who Was That Man I Saw You With? (1969)
- Born: 4 March 1920; Bearsden, Scotland
- Died: 29 August 2002 (aged 82); London, England
- Years active: 1954–1999

Alan MacNaughtan (4 March 1920 – 29 August 2002) was a Scottish actor, born in Bearsden, Dunbartonshire, Scotland. He was educated at the Glasgow Academy, trained at RADA, and graduated in 1940 with the Bancroft Gold Medal. An experienced Old Vic, West End and Broadway actor, he became active in television and certain films between 1954 and 1999.

== Television career ==
MacNaughtan played many guest roles in productions of the 1960s and 1970s including Dr. Finlay's Casebook, The Avengers, The Baron, "The Maze" (ATV/ITC, 1966), Department S, Who Plays the Dummy? (ATV/ITC, 1969), The Saint, The Professionals, A Stirring of Dust (LWT/Avengers Mark 1, 1978). He also played Major Brenan, a deceptive MI5 agent in The Ghost Talks (Randall and Hopkirk Deceased) in 1969. MacNaughtan's sharp blue eyes and features meant that he often played a villain in such ITC series.

He appeared at Laurence Olivier's National Theatre in roles which brought "considerable acclaim"; including in 1972, as Walter Burns in a revival of The Front Page.

MacNaughtan played Sir Geoffrey Wellingham in Yorkshire Television's The Sandbaggers, Dr. Crawley in Thames Television's Mr Palfrey of Westminster, and portrayed the acerbic teacher Howarth in the 1981 BBC serial To Serve Them All My Days. He played the role of Sir Percy Browne, head of MI5, in A Very British Coup in 1988.

His last role was an appearance in Kavanagh QC in 1999.

== Films ==
He made a few appearances in films including starring alongside Dirk Bogarde as his disapproving brother-in-law in the then controversial Victim (1961). He also had roles in Frankenstein Created Woman (1967), Patton (1970), Family Life (1971), The Last Days of Patton (1986), Blue Ice (1992), and The Commissioner (1998).

He was a friend of actor Alec McCowen.

MacNaughtan died of cancer on 29 August 2002, aged 82.

== Filmography ==
Year	Title	Role	Notes
1956	Bond of Fear	Det. Sgt. Daley	
1957	The Secret Place	Police Inspector	Uncredited
1961	Victim	Scott Hankin	
1963	The Double	John Cleeve	
1964	Children of the Damned	British Officer	Uncredited
1967	Frankenstein Created Woman	Kleve	
1970	Patton	British briefing Officer	
1971	Family Life	Mr. Caswell	
1976-1977	Yanks Go Home	Colonel Ralph Kruger	7 episodes
1984	Strangers and Brothers	Winslow	2 episodes
1985	Shadowlands	Christopher Riley	
1986	The Last Days of Patton	Brigadier Hugh Cairns	
1992	Blue Ice	Lewis Mandorf	
1998	The Commissioner	Karl Ritter	
