= It's Supposed to be Thicker than Water =

- Randall and Hopkirk (Deceased) episode
- Episode no.: Season 1 Episode 22
- Directed by: Leslie Norman
- Written by: Donald James
- Production code: 22
- Original air date: 13 February 1970

Guest appearances
- Felix Aylmer; John Hallam; Liz Fraser; Neil McCallum; Meredith Edwards

Episode chronology
← Previous "The Ghost Talks"	Next → "The Trouble with Women"

"It's Supposed to be Thicker than Water" is the twenty-second episode of the 1969 ITC British television series Randall and Hopkirk (Deceased) starring Mike Pratt, Kenneth Cope and Annette Andre. The episode was first broadcast on 13 February 1970 on the ITV. It was directed by Leslie Norman.

== Synopsis ==
Jeff (Mike Pratt) is hired to perform the seemingly simple task of delivering an envelope to an escaped convict - but doesn't know what the envelope contains.

== Cast ==
- Mike Pratt as Jeff Randall
- Kenneth Cope as Marty Hopkirk
- Annette Andre as Jeannie Hopkirk
- Graham Armitage .... Young Stage Director
- Felix Aylmer .... Joshua Crackan
- Dick Bentley .... Mesmero
- Meredith Edwards .... Hodder
- Liz Fraser .... Fay Crackan
- Earl Green .... Ramon
- John Hallam .... Johnny Crackan
- Neil McCallum .... Rev. Henry Crackan
- Michael Ripper .... Punter
- John A. Tinn .... Sung Lee Crackan
- Robert Harbin .... auditioning magician (uncredited)

== Production ==
Although the 22nd episode in the series, It's Supposed to be Thicker than Water was the 8th episode to be shot, filmed between September and October 1968.
