= Edwin Apps =

English actor (1931–2021)

- Born: 14 May 1931; Wingham, Kent, England
- Died: 16 April 2021 (aged 89); France
- Occupations: Television actor, screenwriter and painter
- Spouse: Pauline Devaney (div.)

Edwin Apps (14 May 1931 – 16 April 2021) was an English television actor and writer. He appeared in many British and French television series and films, which include Whack-O!, I Thank a Fool, Danger Man, The Avengers, Steptoe and Son, My Wife Next Door, Special Branch, Katts and Dog, The Messenger: The Story of Joan of Arc, Vatel, Joséphine, ange gardien, 15 ans et demi and others.

He created and co-wrote the 1960s sitcom All Gas and Gaiters (1966–71) with his wife, actress Pauline Devaney. Their joint writing was sometimes credited to the pseudonym John Wraith.

== Acting credits ==
Production	Notes	Role
A Place of Execution	"Eye for an Eye" (1953)	
Armchair Theatre	"It Pays to Advertise" (1957)	Ellery Clark
Hour of Mystery	"Night Must Fall" (1957)	Hubert Laurie
The Stolen Miniatures	TV Short (1957)	Dr. Barling
Whack-O!	31 episodes (1958–60)	Mr. L.J. Halliforth
Dial 999	"Illegal Entry" (1959)	Lab Technician
ITV Play of the Week	"Parnell" (1959); "The Protest" (1960); "A Choice of Coward 1: Present Laughter" (1964); "The Edwardians 4: The Madras House" (1965)	Mr. Stanley; Hotel manager Henry Lyppiatt; Windlesham
Magnolia Street	1 episode (1961)	Eric Winberg
Deadline Midnight	"Take Over" (1961)	Reporter
Citizen James	2 episodes (1961)	
Here's Harry	12 episodes (1961–65)	
Top Secret	"Dangerous Project" (1962)	Frederico
I Thank a Fool	Film (1962)	Junior Counsel
Out of This World	"The Tycoons" (1962)	Mr. Crampsey
The Benny Hill Show	2 episodes (1962)	
Mr Justice Duncannon	2 episodes (1963)	Mr. Marsham, Defence Counsel
Comedy Playhouse	"Have You Read This Notice?" (1963); "The Handyman" (1963)	Aeroplane Passenger; First Card Player
William	"William goes Shopping" (1963)	Outfitter
More Faces of Jim	"A Matter of Spreadeagling" (1963)	Publius Conspicuous
Ring of Spies	Film (1964)	Blake (uncredited)
Hugh and I	"A Fat Chance of Slimming" (1964)	
The Bargee	Film (1964)	George (Barman)
The Graham Stark Show	2 episodes (1964)	Actor
Mike	"The Wandering Overcoat" (1964)	Mr. Wilson
Meet the Wife	"The Shelf" (1964)	The Brush Salesman
Danger Man	2 episodes (1964)	Mumford
The Indian Tales of Rudyard Kipling	"The Man Who Was" (1964)	Captain Bassett
Armchair Mystery Theatre	"Man and Mirror" (1965)	Mr. Medina
The World of Wooster	"Jeeves and the Song of Songs" (1965)	Tuppy Glossop
Summer Comedy Hour	"Charley's Aunt" (1965); "Almost a Honeymoon" (1965)	Brassett; Mr. Dixon
Pardon the Expression	"Self Defence" (1966)	Lloyd
The Liars	1 episode (1966)	Riggles Barton
Three Rousing Tinkles	TV series (1966)	Bro Paradock
Harry Worth	"To Be Called For" (1966)	
Four Tall Tinkles	TV Series (1967)	Bro Paradock
Orlando	"Curtain up" (1967)	Mr. Diddybox
The Avengers	"The Correct Way to Kill" (1967)	Winters
Ooh La La!	"Making a Pass" (1968)	
The Root of All Evil?	"West of Eden" (1968)	Mr. Crump
ITV Sunday Night Theatre	"Suffer Little Children" (1970)	Psephologist
Steptoe and Son	"Live Now, P.A.Y.E. Later" (1972)	Official
Love Thy Neighbour	"Religious Fervour" (1972)	The Captain
My Wife Next Door	"Undesirable Residence" (1972)	Mr. Mitchell
Late Night Theatre	"1939" (1973)	Praed
Special Branch	"Stand and Deliver" (1974)	Major Philip Erskine
The Galton & Simpson Playhouse	"Cheers" (1977)	Graham the Barman
The Black Panther	Film (1977)	
King of the Olympics: The Lives and Loves of Avery Brundage	TV Film (1988)	Adrianov
Crossbow	"The Mission" (1989)	Captain of the Guard
Katts and Dog	3 episodes (1991)	
Highlander: The Raven	"Thick as Thieves" (1999)	Chancellor
The Messenger: The Story of Joan of Arc	Film (1999)	Bishop
Rendezvous in Samarkand	Film (1999)	Callum
Vatel	Film (2000)	Fish Deliveryman
Joséphine, ange gardien	"Noble cause" (2005)	Monsieur Smith
15 ans et demi	Film (2008)	Un scientifique
JC comme Jésus Christ	Film (2011)	Le pédopsy

== Writing credits ==
Production	Notes
Summer Comedy Hour	"Charley's Aunt" (1965) (adaptation - as John Wraith)
All Gas and Gaiters	33 episodes (1966–71)
Comedy Playhouse	3 episodes (1966; 1974)
