= Frankenfido =

- The Goodies episode
- Episode no.: Series 5 Episode 5
- Original air date: 10 March 1975

Guest appearance
- Magnus Magnusson as Magnus Magnesium

Episode chronology
← Previous "Wacky Wales"	Next → "Scatty Safari"

"Frankenfido" is an episode of the British comedy television series The Goodies.

As with other episodes in the series, this episode was written by members of The Goodies.

== Plot ==
Graeme has ventured into the world of dog breeding, cross breeding dogs to a ridiculous extent, and has planned on giving a 'special dog' to enter in Crufts. When Tim and Bill receive the dog, they at first believe it to be dead, but it is merely asleep. After doing tricks, the dog wees itself and Bill puts it through a mangle, before they then worry that they actually killed it. Then they find, via a label on the dog's parcel, that Graeme has been making all kinds of weird dogs for other people as well.

They go to Graeme's breeding kennel, and confront him, yet he claims that he has exhausted all possibilities when it comes to breeding dogs ... with dogs. He has begun cross-breeding between species, such as a hybrid between a French poodle and a frog, or between a Chichuhuahua and a rock salmon. Graeme then asks where Bill and Tim put the dog, which turns out to be the cupboard where Graeme keeps his hormones, and suddenly a number of puppies rush out and escape. After Bill and Tim return, Graeme believes that the dog had conceived the puppies with a feather duster, and sets to work breeding dogs with furniture. When Bill and Tim turn up at Cruft's, they see some of Graeme's efforts, such as a North Sea gas Dalmatian and a King Charles Spaniel lavatory.

In an attempt at winning, Bill disguises himself as a black and white dog called "Cuddly Scamp Hairylegs of Cricklewood", which proves to be a quick-thinking 'dog' or possibly cheating with false answers when tested on "Mastermind".

After losing to Bill, Graeme tries to make something new, and when Tim visits, he reveals his plan, having procured parts of people like Robin Day, Yul Brinner and Nicholas Parsons. Tim, horrified, says: "You're using people ... and Donny Osmond!" Tim leaves in shock, and Graeme brings his creation, 'Frankenfido' to life.

During the finals at Cruft's, Frankenfido enters as the late entry Cuddly Scamp got fiercely jealous with Graeme's creation. The two competitors starts fighting leading a disastrous result of mayhem as all of the dogs gone out of control.

After they meet at Cruft's, Cuddly Scamp and Frankenfido chase each other about London, until they reach Graeme's lab. After this we cut to a year later, when Frankenfido finally dismantled, and Bill now thinking he is a dog. Tim comments: "Who knows what he went through! All alone with that nasty great dog!" Graeme comments: "Bitch!" Tim, insulted, says: "Well!" Graeme explains, saying: "Frankenfido was a bitch." to which Tim responds with: "Oh I see. "Tim comes to a horrific realisation, and we see that Cuddly Scamp's meeting with Frankenfido has surprising results.

== Cultural references ==
- Crufts
- Mastermind — of which Magnus Magnusson is the actual host
- Frankenstein's Monster
