= The Bed-Sit Girl =

British TV sitcom (1965–1966)

- Radio Times cover, April 1966
- Genre: Sitcom
- Created by: Chesney and Wolfe
- Starring: Sheila Hancock; Dilys Laye; Hy Hazell; Derek Nimmo
- Country of origin: United Kingdom
- No. of series: 2
- No. of episodes: 12 (all missing)

Production
- Running time: 25 minutes (1965); 30 minutes (1966)

Original release
- Network: BBC1
- Release: 13 April 1965 – 23 May 1966

The Bed-Sit Girl is a British television sitcom that aired on BBC1 from 1965 to 1966. Created by Chesney and Wolfe for Sheila Hancock, The Bed-Sit Girl aired for two series.

Hancock played Sheila Ross, a typist who lives in a bedsit and wishes for more in life. In the first series, Dilys Laye played her air hostess neighbour Dilys, and in the second Hy Hazell played Sheila's friend Liz. Derek Nimmo also appeared as her neighbour and boyfriend David in Series Two. All twelve episodes are believed lost.

== Production ==
The Bed-Sit Girl was created by writing duo Ronald Chesney and Ronald Wolfe for Sheila Hancock, who had starred in their 1961–1963 sitcom The Rag Trade. The producer for the first series was Duncan Wood while for the second series it was Graeme Muir. The Bed-Sit Girl was made in black-and-white.

== Cast ==
- Sheila Hancock as Sheila Ross
- Dilys Laye as Dilys (series 1)
- Hy Hazell as Liz (series 2)
- Derek Nimmo as David (series 2)

== Plot ==
Sheila Ross is a young typist who lives in a bedsit in London. Not entirely happy with her life, Sheila dreams of more and would like a more glamorous job like her neighbour, Dilys, who is an air hostess. In the second series, Dilys has moved on, and Sheila's friend Liz appears. The second series also features David, who lives in the bedsit next to Sheila's and becomes her boyfriend.

== Episodes ==
The first series, of six 25-minute episodes, aired from 13 April to 18 May 1965 on Tuesday evenings at 8.00pm. The second series, of six 30-minute episodes, aired from 18 April to 23 May 1966 on Monday evenings at 7.30pm. All twelve episodes are missing and are believed lost.

=== Series One (1965) ===
1. "The Italian Pilot" (13 April 1965)
2. "The Dress" (20 April 1965)
3. "The Medical Stud" (27 April 1965)
4. "The Last Half Inch" (4 May 1965)
5. "The Air Hostess" (11 May 1965)
6. "The Breakfast" (18 May 1965)

=== Series Two (1966) ===
1. "The List" (18 April 1966)
2. Episode Two (25 April 1966)
3. Episode Three (2 May 1966)
4. Episode Four (9 May 1966)
5. Episode Five (16 May 1966)
6. Episode Six (23 May 1966)

== Sorry I'm Single ==
Derek Nimmo's character David was revived by Chesney and Wolfe in their later sitcom Sorry I'm Single (1967). In Sorry I'm Single Nimmo played David, a mature student who shares digs in Hampstead with three women. This series is also thought lost, and no episodes have survived.
