= Felix Aylmer =

English actor (1889–1979)

Sir Felix Aylmer OBE
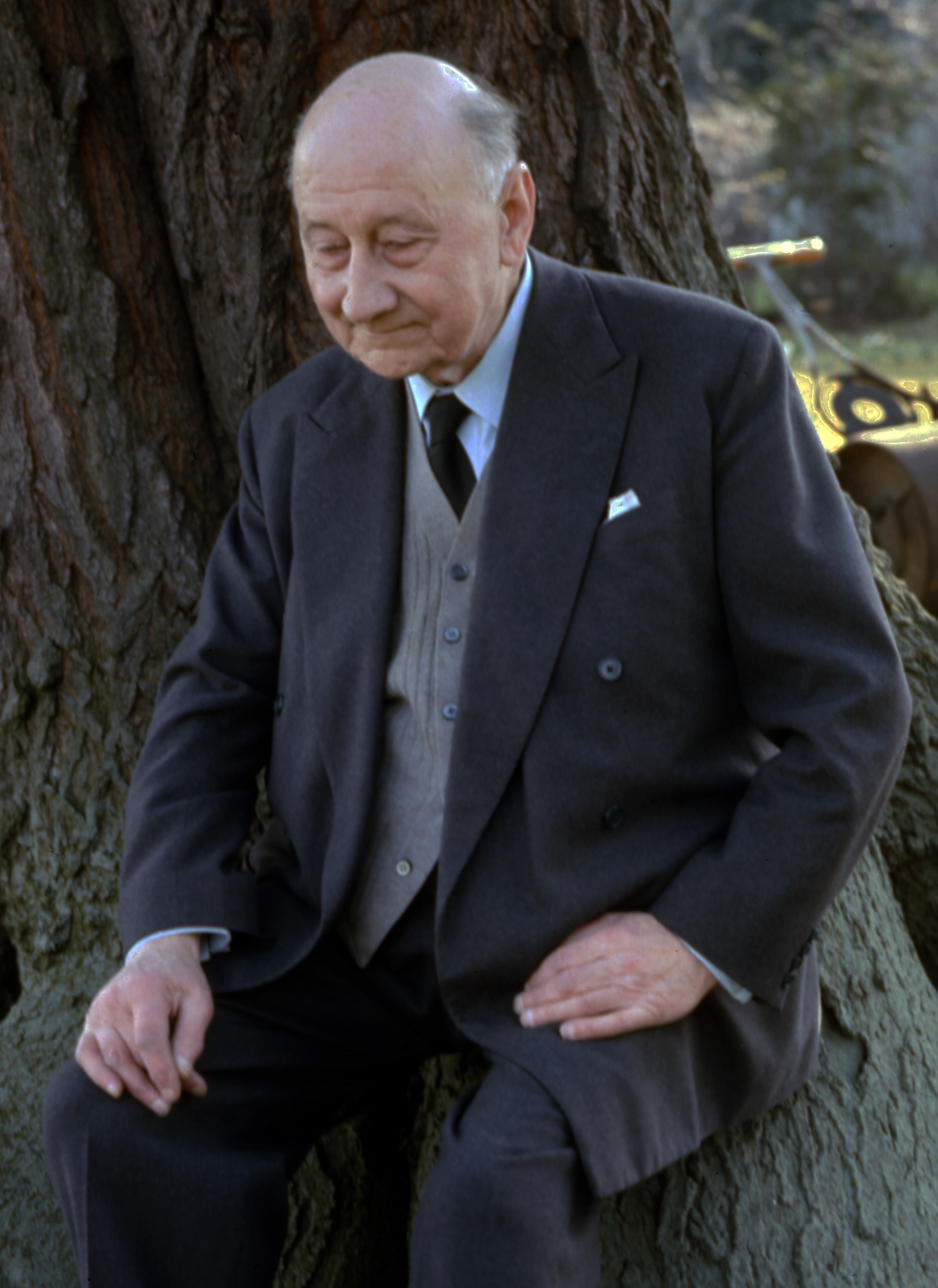
- Felix Aylmer, 1973
- Born: Felix Edward Aylmer Jones; 21 February 1889; Corsham, Wiltshire, England
- Died: 2 September 1979 (aged 90); Pyrford, Surrey, England
- Years active: 1911–1979
- Spouse: Cecily Byrne (m. 1915; died 1975)
- Children: 3

Sir Felix Edward Aylmer Jones (21 February 1889 – 2 September 1979) was an English stage actor who also appeared in the cinema and on television. Aylmer made appearances in films with comedians such as Will Hay and George Formby.

== Early life ==
Felix Edward Aylmer Jones was born in Corsham, Wiltshire, the second of six children (five sons and a daughter) of Lieutenant-Colonel Thomas Edward Aylmer Jones, of the Royal Engineers, and his wife Lilian, née Cookworthy. He was educated at King James's Grammar School, Almondbury, near Huddersfield, where he was a boarder from 1897 to 1900, Magdalen College School, and Exeter College, Oxford, where he was a member of Oxford University Dramatic Society (OUDS). He trained under the Victorian-era actress and director Rosina Filippi before securing his first professional engagement at the London Coliseum in 1911. He appeared in the world premiere of The Farmer's Wife by Eden Phillpotts at the Birmingham Repertory Theatre in 1917. Between 1917 and 1919 he served as a junior officer in the Royal Naval Volunteer Reserve (R.N.V.R.).

== Career ==
He acted with Sir Laurence Olivier in Shakespearean films, appearing as Polonius in Hamlet (1948), and often played wise old men, such as Merlin in Knights of the Round Table (1953). He played the Archbishop of Canterbury in the film adaptation of Becket (1964), with Richard Burton and Peter O'Toole and gave elocution lessons to the young Audrey Hepburn.

His memorable style of delivery—dignified and learned— was frequently mimicked by comedians such as Peter Sellers and Kenneth Williams. Indeed, as dramatist and barrister John Mortimer noted, the mannerisms Aylmer brought to bear in his roles came to be imitated in real life by judges on the bench. Williams observed that although his impersonation of Aylmer was a speciality during his days with ENSA, the Armed Forces Entertainment Association, he came to the conclusion that none of the troops knew who was being impersonated.

Aylmer was President of Equity from 1950 to 1969. He was made an Officer of the Order of the British Empire in the 1950 King's Birthday Honours and knighted in the 1965 Queen's Birthday Honours.

He was also the narrator in the original version (and recobbled cut) of Richard Williams' unfinished animated project, The Thief and the Cobbler (1993).

At the age of 80 Felix Aylmer played a villain in an episode of Randall and Hopkirk (Deceased) entitled "It's Supposed to be Thicker than Water". His last major screen role was as the Abbot in the sitcom Oh, Brother!, opposite Derek Nimmo (1968–70). He appeared as a doctor in an episode of the TV series Jason King called "If It's Got To Go, It's Got To Go" in 1972, at the age of 83.

Aylmer lived in Painshill House in Cobham, Surrey and died in a nursing home in Pyrford on 2 September 1979, at the age of 90.

== Personal life ==
He married Cecily Minnie Jane Byrne during the First World War, and they had three children.

== Publications ==
- Dickens Incognito (1959)
- The Drood Case (1964)

== Selected stage credits ==
- The Inca of Perusalem (1916)
- The Farmer's Wife (1917)
- The Likes of Her (1923)
- The Terror (1927)
- Badger's Green (1930)
- Spider's Web (1954)

== Filmography ==
=== 1930–1940 ===
Year	Title	Role	Notes
1930	Escape	Governor	
1930	The Temporary Widow	Public Prosecutor	
1932	The World, the Flesh, the Devil	Sir Henderson Trent	
1933	The Shadow	Sir Richard Bryant	
1933	The Wandering Jew	Ferera	
1933	The Ghost Camera	Coroner	
1933	Home Sweet Home	Robert Wilding KC	
1934	The Path of Glory	President of Thalia	
1934	The Night Club Queen	Prosecution	
1934	Whispering Tongues	Supt. Fulton	
1934	Doctor's Orders	Sir Daniel Summerfield	released as The Doctor's Secret in USA
1934	My Old Dutch	Judge	
1934	The Iron Duke	Lord Uxbridge	
1935	The Clairvoyant	Prosecutor	Uncredited
1935	The Divine Spark	Butler	
1935	Hello, Sweetheart	Peabody	
1935	Old Roses	Lord Sandelbury	
1935	The Ace of Spades	Lord Yardleigh	
1935	Checkmate	Henry Nicholls	
1935	The Price of a Song	Graham	
1935	Her Last Affaire	Lord Carnforth	
1935	She Shall Have Music	Donald Black	
1936	The Improper Duchess	Count Seidel	
1936	Rhodes of Africa	Johannesburg Diplomat	Uncredited, released as Rhodes in USA
1936	Tudor Rose	Edward Seymour	released as Nine Days a Queen in USA
1936	In the Soup	Counsel	Uncredited
1936	Seven Sinners	Sir Charles Webber	
1936	Royal Eagle	Windridge	
1936	As You Like It	Duke Frederick	
1936	Dusty Ermine	Police commissioner	
1936	The Man in the Mirror	The Earl of Wigan	
1936	Sensation	Lord Bouverie	
1936	Jack of All Trades	Managing director	
1936	The Mill on the Floss	Mr Wakem	
1937	Action for Slander	Sir Eustace Cunninghame	
1937	Dreaming Lips	Sir Robert Blaker	
1937	The Frog	John Bennett	
1937	Glamorous Night	Diplomat	
1937	The Vicar of Bray	Earl of Brendon	
1937	Victoria the Great	Lord Palmerston	
1937	The Rat	Prosecuting Counsel	
1937	The Live Wire	Wilton	
1938	South Riding	Chairman of Council	
1938	Bank Holiday	Surgeon	
1938	Just like a Woman	Sir Robert Hummel	
1938	Break the News	Sir George Bickory	
1938	Kate Plus Ten	Bishop	
1938	I've Got a Horse	Lovatt	
1938	Sixty Glorious Years	Lord Palmerston	released as Queen of Destiny in USA
1938	The Citadel	Mr Boon	
1939	Young Man's Fancy	Sir Caleb Crowther	
1940	Dr. O'Dowd	President	
1940	Spies of the Air	Colonel Cairns	
1940	The Girl in the News	Prosecuting counsel	
1940	Night Train to Munich	Dr John Fredericks	
1940	Charley's (Big-Hearted) Aunt	The Proctor	
1940	The Briggs Family	Mr Sand	
1940	The Case of the Frightened Lady	Dr Amersham	released as The Frightened Lady in USA
1940	Saloon Bar	Mayor	

=== 1941–1950 ===
Year	Title	Role	Notes
1941	The Ghost of St. Michael's	Dr. Winter	
1941	Major Barbara	James	
1941	Kipps	Architect	Uncredited
1941	The Saint's Vacation	Leighton	
1941	Spellbound	Mr Morton	(AKA ' Passing Clouds '). Released as The Spell of Amy Nugent in USA
1941	Once a Crook	King's counsel	
1941	Atlantic Ferry	bank president	
1941	I Thank You	Henry Potter	
1941	South American George	Mr Appleby	
1941	Hi Gang!	Lord Amersham	
1942	The Seventh Survivor	Sir Elmer Norton	
1942	The Black Sheep of Whitehall	Crabtree	
1942	Uncensored	Colonel von Hohenstein	
1942	Sabotage at Sea	John Dighton	
1942	The Young Mr. Pitt	Lord North	
1943	The Peterville Diamond	President	
1943	Thursday's Child	Mr Keith	
1943	The Life and Death of Colonel Blimp	The Bishop	
1943	Escape to Danger	Sir Alfred Horton	
1943	The Demi-Paradise	Mr Runalow	
1944	Time Flies	The Professor	
1944	English Without Tears	Mr. Spaggot	
1944	Mr. Emmanuel	Mr Emmanuel	
1944	Henry V	Archbishop of Canterbury	
1945	The Way to the Stars	Reverend Charles Moss	
1945	The Wicked Lady	Hogarth	
1945	Caesar and Cleopatra	First nobleman	
1946	The Years Between	Sir Enrst Forster	
1946	The Magic Bow	Signor Fazzini	
1946	The Laughing Lady	Sir Felix Mountroyal	
1947	The Man Within	Priest	
1947	Green Fingers	Daniel Booth	
1947	The October Man	Dr Martin	
1947	A Man About the House	Richard Sanctuary	
1947	The Ghosts of Berkeley Square	Col. H. "Bulldog" Kelsoe	
1948	Hamlet	Polonius	
1948	The Calendar	Lord Forlingham	
1948	Quartet	Martin	(segment "The Colonel's Lady")
1949	Edward, My Son	Mr Hanray	
1949	Alice in Wonderland	Dr Liddell / The Cheshire Cat	Voice
1949	Christopher Columbus	Father Perez	
1949	Prince of Foxes	Count Marc Antonio Verano	
1950	Your Witness	British judge	released as Eye Witness in USA
1950	So Long at the Fair	British consul	
1950	Trio	Bank manager	(segment "The Verger")
1950	She Shall Have Murder	Mr Playfair	

=== 1951–1960 ===
Year	Title	Role	Notes
1951	No Highway	Sir Philip	Uncredited
1951	The Lady with a Lamp	Lord Palmerston	
1951	The House in the Square	Sir William, the Physician	Uncredited, released as I'll Never forget You in USA
1951	Quo Vadis	Plautius	
1952	Ivanhoe	Isaac	
1952	The Man Who Watched the Trains Go By	Mr. Merkemans	released as The Paris Express in USA
1953	The Master of Ballantrae	Lord Durrisdeer	
1953	Knights of the Round Table	Merlin	
1953	The Triangle	Brisetout	(segment "A Lodging for the Night")
1954	The Love Lottery	Winant	
1954	The Angel Who Pawned Her Harp	Joshua Webman	
1956	Loser Takes All	The Other	
1956	Anastasia	Chamberlain	
1957	Saint Joan	Inquisitor	
1958	I Accuse!	Edgar Demange	
1958	The Two-Headed Spy	Cornaz	
1958	The Doctor's Dilemma	Sir Patrick Cullen	
1958	Separate Tables	Mr. Fowler	
1959	The Mummy	Stephen Banning	
1960	Never Take Sweets from a Stranger	Clarence Olderberry Sr.	
1960	From the Terrace	James Duncan MacHardie	
1960	Exodus	Dr Liberman	
1960	The Hands of Orlac	Dr Francis Cochrane	

=== 1961–1992 ===
Year	Title	Role	Notes
1962	The Road to Hong Kong	Grand Lama	
1962	The Boys	Judge	
1963	The Running Man	Parson	
1964	Becket	Archbishop of Canterbury	
1964	The Chalk Garden	Judge McWhirrey	
1965	Masquerade	Henrickson	
1966	Out of the Unknown	Mr. Bone	Episode: Walk's End
1968	The Champions	Old Man	Episode: The Beginning
1968	Decline and Fall... of a Birdwatcher	Judge	
1968	Hostile Witness	Justice Osborne	
1968–1970	Oh, Brother!	Father Anselm	19 episodes
1970	Randall and Hopkirk (Deceased)	Joshua Crackan	Episode: It's Supposed to be Thicker than Water
1972	Jason King	Dr Wilstein	Episode: If It's Got to Go, It's Got to Go
1973	Oh, Father!	Father Anselm	Two episodes
1992	The Thief and the Cobbler	Narrator	Original version and recobbled cut; released posthumously
