= The Ghost Talks (Randall and Hopkirk (Deceased)) =

"The Ghost Talks"
- Randall and Hopkirk (Deceased) episode
- Episode no.: Season 1 Episode 21
- Directed by: Cyril Frankel
- Written by: Gerald Kelsey
- Production code: 21
- Original air date: 6 February 1970

Guest appearances
- Alan MacNaughtan, Geoffrey King

Episode chronology
← Previous "Money to Burn"	Next → "It's Supposed to be Thicker than Water"

"The Ghost Talks" is the twenty-first episode of the 1969 ITC British television series Randall and Hopkirk (Deceased) starring Mike Pratt, Kenneth Cope and Annette Andre. The episode was first broadcast on 6 February 1970, on ITV, and was directed by Cyril Frankel.

== Synopsis ==
With Jeff laid up in a hospital bed with one arm and one leg in plaster (having fallen off a balcony whilst trying to apprehend a safe-cracker), Marty visits and seizes the opportunity to tell him about a spy drama that he handled while he was still alive — the details of which he has never previously revealed — involving a corrupt MI5 official and spy ring.

While Jeff was out of town, Marty was hired a man who claimed to be Sir Basil Duggan, a top MI5 official, at a country club to retrieve "stolen" important documents from a supposed unloyal member of the British Secret Service. However, the morning after Marty and his hired Liverpudlian safecracker (who also personally steals a diamond necklace) successfully locate the documents, it turns out to be an actual theft from the real important member of MI5. Marty, in disgust, tries to hunt down the imposter who he learns is named Major Brenan.

Marty overpowers one of the imposter's leading henchman who attempts to kill him in his car. Marty slams on the brakes smashing the henchman's head against the window, later tying him up in his apartment.

Marty eventually locates Brenan in the sauna of the country club where Marty hides in an overheated sauna with his suit on (underneath towels) to attempt to avoid capture from the imposter's henchmen.

Marty tracks down the imposter's car registration number and shadows him to the docks where the Brenan plans an escape with the stolen documents aboard a ship to a foreign country. Marty is eventually able to contact the BBC via the ship's radio for the police to round up the perpetrators.

When Marty has finished telling the story, he disappears. Then Jeannie arrives to visit Jeff and begins to tell him the same story all over again, causing Jeff to roll his eyes in exasperation.

== Overview ==
This the only episode in the entire series where the main story is based on a past event.

Mike Pratt had broken his legs in real life and was confined to bed.

Brenan's car was the same as used by O'Malley in the episode "Money to Burn".

== Cast ==
- John Boxer ... Dr. Musgrove
- Ian Butler ... Page Boy
- Martin Carroll ... Groves
- Peter Cellier ... Long
- John Collin ... Jackson
- James Culliford... Parker
- Thomas Heathcote ... Chief Inspector Horner
- Geoffrey King ... Sir Basil Duggan
- Jack Lambert ... 2nd Man in Steamroom
- Jack MacGowran ... Joe Hudson
- Alan MacNaughtan ... Major Brenan
- Marne Maitland... Captain Rashid
- Hilary Wontner ... 1st Man in Steamroom

== Home media ==
The episode was released on VHS and several times on DVD with differing special features.
