= Hell's Bells (TV series) =

1986 British TV comedy series

- Genre: Comedy
- Created by: Jan Butlin
- Starring: Derek Nimmo; Robert Stephens; Penelope Horner; Milton Johns; Susan Jameson; Phyllida Law
- Country of origin: United Kingdom
- Original language: English
- No. of series: 1
- No. of episodes: 6

Production
- Producer: Mike Stephens
- Running time: 30 minutes

Original release
- Network: BBC1
- Release: 9 June – 14 July 1986

Hell's Bells is a British television comedy series made by BBC Television starring Derek Nimmo as the traditionalist Dean "Selwyn" Makepeace, who finds himself consistently at loggerheads with his modernising new Bishop Godfrey Hethercote (played by Robert Stephens). It was first broadcast in 1986, and only one series was made.

== Episodes ==
No.	Title	Directed by	Written by	Original release date
1	"On Your Bike, Pilgrim!"	Mike Stephens	Jan Butlin	9 June 1986
2	"Pop Goes St. Winifred's"	Mike Stephens	Jan Butlin	16 June 1986
3	"Back Page Story"	Mike Stephens	Jan Butlin	23 June 1986
4	"Dem Bones, Dem Bones, Dem Dry Bones"	Mike Stephens	Jan Butlin	30 June 1986
5	"Big Boys Don't Cry"	Mike Stephens	Jan Butlin	7 July 1986
6	"God Is in Her Heaven"	Mike Stephens	Jan Butlin	14 July 1986
