= Derek Nimmo =

English actor (1930–1999)

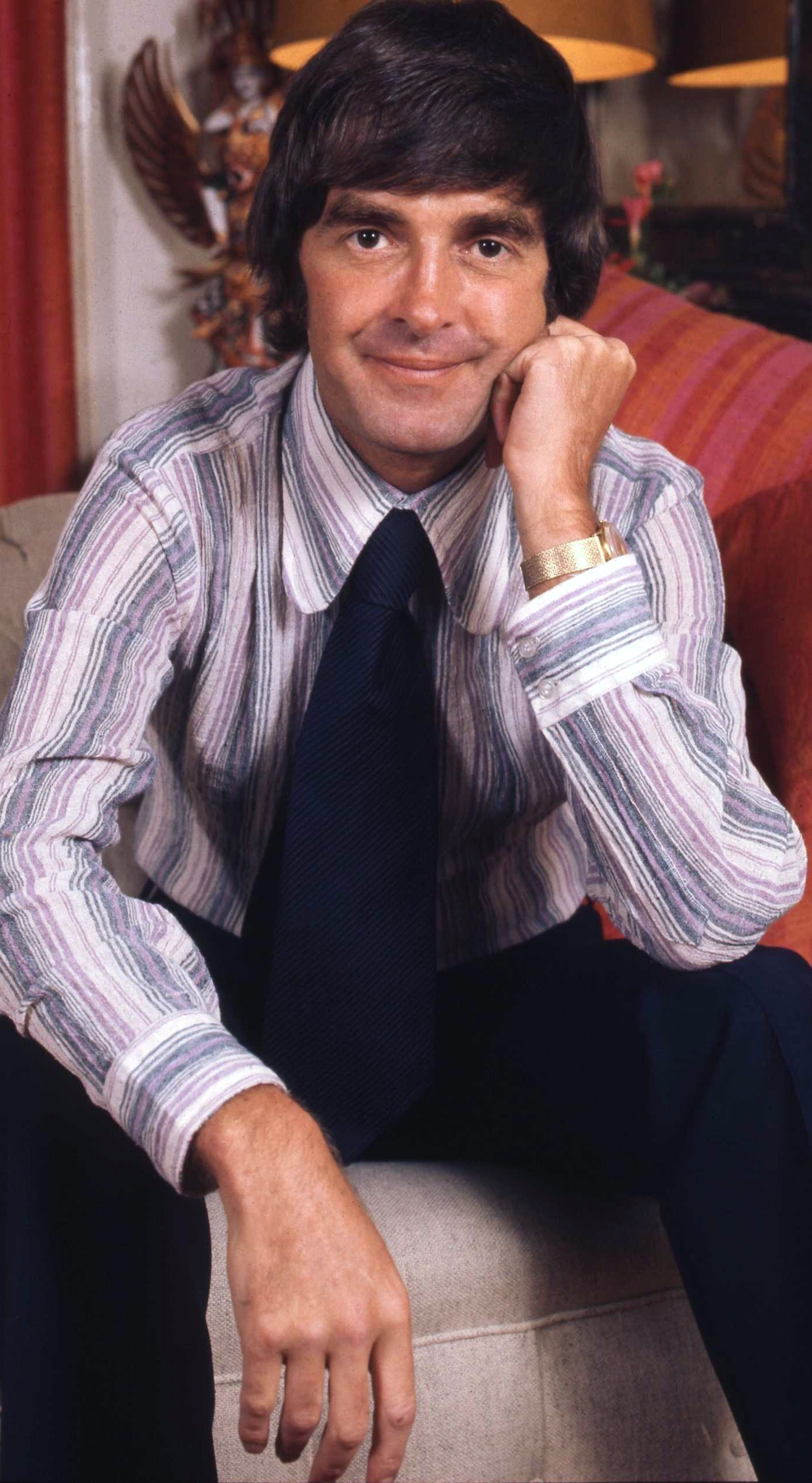
- Nimmo in 1975
- Born: Derek Robert Nimmo; 19 September 1930; Liverpool, Lancashire, England
- Died: 24 February 1999 (aged 68); Chelsea, London, England
- Resting place: Church of St Peter and St Paul, Easton Maudit
- Education: Quarry Bank High School for Boys
- Occupations: Actor, theatre manager
- Years active: 1956–1996
- Spouse: Patricia Brown (m. 1955)
- Children: 4

Derek Robert Nimmo (19 September 1930 – 24 February 1999) was an English character actor, producer and author. He is best remembered for his comedic upper class "silly ass" and clerical roles, including Revd Mervyn Noote in the BBC1 sitcom All Gas and Gaiters (1966–71). In the role of theatrical impresario, he took his own touring production to 30 countries; he died from complications following a fall at his home in London.

== Career ==
Nimmo was born in Liverpool, Lancashire, the son of an insurance salesman, and grew up in Mossley Hill in an environment he described as "old merchants' houses, comfy English suburbia". He was educated at Booker Avenue Infants and Junior School and Quarry Bank High School for Boys, then a grammar school under headmaster R. F. Bailey, who brought with him, from his previous position as assistant headmaster at leading independent school Shrewsbury School, "the finest traditions of public schools". He then followed his father into the insurance business, and after National Service in Cyprus, became a salesman for a paint company. He began his stage career at the Hippodrome Theatre in Bolton, Lancashire. It was during this time that he made a cameo appearance in the Beatles' film A Hard Day's Night (in which he appeared as "Leslie Jackson", a magician with doves).

He appeared in a number of British films and television series, as aristocrats, including starring roles in the television comedy series The World of Wooster (as "Bingo Little"), and in the comedy film One of Our Dinosaurs Is Missing (as "Lord Southmere"), as well as appearing in the James Bond spoof film Casino Royale.

Nimmo made his name as the Reverend Mervyn Noote in the British sitcom All Gas and Gaiters (1966). At the time it was considered rather controversial because the main characters were senior churchmen (the Bishop, his chaplain Noote and the Archdeacon) who got into various scrapes as a result of their general incompetence. By the time the series finished, Nimmo was identified with the stereotype of a traditional British clergyman and he went on to play a bungling monk in another BBC clerical sitcom, Oh, Brother!, and a Roman Catholic priest in its sequel series, Oh, Father! In 1969, Nimmo received an award for his performances in both sitcoms, when the Royal Television Society awarded him a silver medal. Another sitcom in which he appeared in a starring role as a clergyman, many years later, was Hell's Bells (by now promoted to a dean) which ran for one series in 1986. He also appeared as the Reverend Jonathan Green in a television production of Cluedo. He became so well known for his clerical parody that, in the 1975 The Goodies episode "Wacky Wales", a "team of Derek Nimmos" played in a spoof "Ecclesiastical Rugby Sevens" competition.

In 1966, Nimmo appeared in the second series of The Bed-Sit Girl. He appeared on stage in many West End plays and starred in the musical Charlie Girl, which contained a scene specially written to allow him to perform his party trick of wiggling his toes. He also became a regular panellist on the popular BBC radio show Just a Minute, and had a chat show on BBC Television, If It's Saturday, It Must Be Nimmo, from 24 October to 19 December 1970, though it was felt that he seemed less at ease as a chat show host. Having been away from television for some time, he made an appearance in the Australian television series Neighbours in 1990, playing Lord Ledgerwood alongside Madge and Harold Bishop.

As a theatrical impresario, he took his own touring production (Intercontinental Entertainment) to 30 countries, including Australia, New Zealand, Singapore, Hong Kong, Thailand, Oman and the UAE, and so provided himself with material for many stories on Just a Minute.

In the 1970s, Nimmo sang the jingle "P…p…pick up a Penguin" in a series of television advertisements for McVitie's Penguin biscuits, echoing a stammer he had used for his character in All Gas and Gaiters. In 1996, he voiced Mr Smiley in one episode of Dennis the Menace.

In December 1998, having recently returned from a Middle East tour of Run For Your Wife, he was a guest for a National Treasures celebrity lunch, in the boardroom of the Daily Express. Other guests included Sir Peter O'Sullevan, Joan Collins, Dame Beryl Bainbridge, Dickie Davies and Sue MacGregor. He was to die, after complications, from an accidental fall later that evening.

== Personal life ==
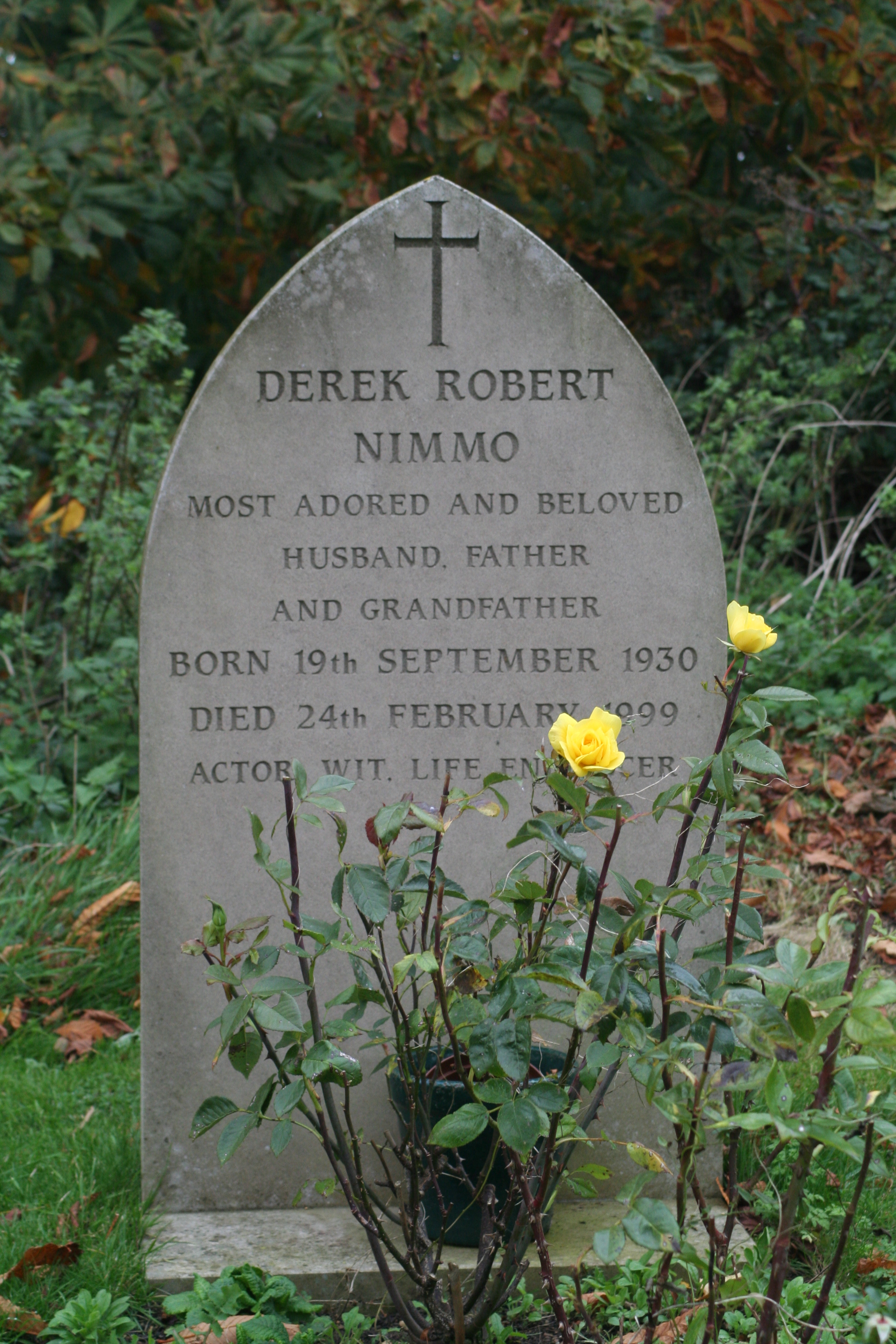
Nimmo's grave at Easton Maudit, Northamptonshire

He married Patricia Brown in 1955; they had three children: Timothy (b. 1956); Piers (b. 1967); and Amanda (b. 1959), who was the first wife of Nicholas Howard, son of politician George Howard, Baron Howard of Henderskelfe. Nimmo had a fourth child, Justin (b. 1971). Justin's mother was a woman known only as Anne, a fellow actor who Nimmo had an affair with from 1969 to 1973, the height of Nimmo's fame. Justin grew up knowing Nimmo was his father and spent time with Nimmo and his other siblings. His existence became public only after Nimmo's death when Nimmo left various personal possessions to Justin in his will.

Nimmo's hobbies included gardening, photography (particularly nature photography), birdwatching and collecting walnut furniture, porcelain and paintings. He was also a wine expert and wrote several books on the subject as well as a number of books on the theatre. Another interest was after dinner speaking, for which he was always in demand.

Nimmo received many awards, including the 1990 Benedictine After Dinner Speaker of the Year. He was made a Freeman of the City of London, and the University of Leicester recognised his contribution to entertainment with an honorary master's degree in 1996. He was an Anglican.

== Death ==
On the evening of 2 December 1998, Nimmo was checking an external alarm outside his house in Kensington when he lost his footing and fell down a stone staircase into the basement. He suffered head injuries and was taken to the Chelsea and Westminster Hospital, where he remained in a coma until the end of December. While still recovering in hospital, he contracted pneumonia and died on 24 February 1999.

Nimmo is buried in the churchyard at Easton Maudit, Northamptonshire.

== Selected filmography ==
=== Film ===
- The Millionairess (1960) as Assistant Butler (uncredited)
- It's Trad, Dad! (1962) as Head Waiter
- Go to Blazes (1962) as Fish Fancier
- The Amorous Prawn (1962) as Pvt. Willie Maltravers
- The Small World of Sammy Lee (1963) as Rembrandt
- Heavens Above! (1963) as Director-General's Assistant
- Tamahine (1963) as Tim Clove
- Hot Enough for June (1964) as Fred
- The Bargee (1964) as Dr. Scott
- Murder Ahoy! (1964) as Sub-Lt. Eric Humbert
- A Hard Day's Night (1964) as Leslie Jackson as Magician (uncredited)
- The System (1964) as James (uncredited)
- Joey Boy (1965) as Lt. Hope
- Coast of Skeletons (1965) as Tom Hamilton
- The Liquidator (1965) as Fly
- The Yellow Hat (1966) as Douglas
- Mister Ten Per Cent (1967) as Tony
- Casino Royale (1967) as Hadley
- A Talent for Loving (1969) as Moodie
- One of Our Dinosaurs Is Missing (1975) as Lord Southmere

=== Television ===
- Angel Pavement (1957, 1 episode)
- The Buccaneers (1957, 1 episode)
- Kenilworth (1957, 2 episodes)
- The Adventures of Peter Simple (1957, 1 episode)
- Ghost Squad (1962, 1 episode)
- Citizen James (1962, 1 episode)
- Mr Justice Duncannon (1963, 1 episode)
- Z-Cars (1963, 1 episode)
- Hancock (1963, 1 episode)
- Armchair Theatre (1963, 1 episode)
- More Faces of Jim (1963, 1 episode)
- Comedy Playhouse (1963–1974, 5 episodes)
- Hugh and I (1963–1964, 2 episodes)
- Baxter On... (1964, 1 episode)
- Sykes and A... (1964, 1 episode)
- Boyd Q.C. (1964, 1 episode)
- The Graham Stark Show (1964, 1 episode)
- The Scales of Justice (1965, 1 episode)
- Steptoe and Son (1965, 1 episode)
- Undermind (1965, 1 episode)
- A World of Comedy (1965, 1 episode)
- The Bed-Sit Girl (1965–1966, 7 episodes)
- The World of Wooster (1965–1967, 5 episodes)
- All Gas and Gaiters (1966–1971, 33 episodes)
- Blandings Castle (1967, 3 episodes)
- Sorry I'm Single (1967, 9 episodes)
- Oh Brother! (1968–1970, 19 episodes)
- Oh, Father! (1973, 7 episodes)
- My Honourable Mrs (1975, 7 episodes)
- Life Begins at Forty (1978–1980, 14 episodes)
- Third Time Lucky (1982, 7 episodes)
- Hell's Bells (1986, 6 episodes)
- Neighbours (1990, 2 episodes)
- Cluedo (1990, 1 episode)
- The Good Guys (1993, 1 episode)
- Dennis the Menace (1996, 1 episode)
