= Jill Hyem =

British actor and screenwriter (1937–2015)

Jill Hyem (8 January 1937 – 5 June 2015) was a British actor, and radio and television writer.

== Early life and acting career ==
Jill Hyem was born in 1937 in Putney, London, England, to Hilda (née Gladwell) and Rex, a solicitor, and was raised in Devon and East Sheen.

From the age of ten, Hyem attended Farlington School, a boarding school in West Sussex, and studied at the Webber Douglas Academy of Dramatic Art. Her early acting experience saw her perform at the Connaught Theatre Worthing, where one of her roles was Eliza Doolittle in Pygmalion. Her film roles include The Trunk (1961) with Phil Carey. In 1962, Hyem made her West End debut in Goodnight Mrs Puffin with Irene Handl.

Hyem's television appearances include The Voodoo Factor (1960), Richard the Lionheart (1962) with Dermot Walsh, Dixon of Dock Green (two episodes 1959 and 1960), and Sergeant Cork (one episode, 1964). She also starred as Peggy Briggs, the daughter of Jimmy Edwards and Beryl Reid in the comedy series Bold as Brass (1964).

Her experience playing minor roles persuaded Hyem she would do better as a writer and create more challenging parts for women.

== Writing career ==
Hyem's writing career began to develop when she became one of the principal writers on the radio soap opera The Dales (originally Mrs Dale's Diary). When that series was coming to an end, she was asked to devise a more contemporary replacement with Alan Downer, and the BBC commissioned Waggoner's Walk. Hyem and Downer stayed with the series over its 11-year run. She also wrote 30 radio plays, including the lesbian love story Now She Laughs, Now She Cries, A Shape Like Piccadilly—which is about adult illiteracy—and the thriller Remember Me with Jill Balcon and Julian Glover, which won the annual Giles Cooper award. Several of Hyem's radio plays including Equal Terms, Life Sentence and Thank You—which was renamed Post Mortems for the stage—became theatrical productions. Her original theatre plays include Buzz—an adaptation of Lorna Doone—and We'll Always Have Paris (2010).

Hyem's television writing includes the BAFTA-nominated drama Tenko (1981–5), for which she wrote half of the episodes. Anne Valery wrote the other half, and the two women collaborated on a sequel, Tenko Reunion (1985). With Tenko's creator Lavinia Warner, Hyem co-created the secret-agent drama Wish Me Luck. Her other work includes episodes of the nurses drama Angels, Wendy Craig's Nanny, the anthology series Sharing Time (1984), the first series of sex-and-sailing soap opera Howards' Way (1985), a mini-series adaptation of Barbara Taylor Bradford's Act of Will (1989), period costume drama The House of Eliott (1991), the Campion episodes "The Case of the Late Pig" (1989) and "Sweet Danger" (1990), the Miss Marple mystery At Bertram's Hotel (1987), and Body and Soul (1993), with Kristin Scott Thomas, for which Hyem was nominated for a BAFTA.

During the writing of Tenko, Hyem and Valery faced opposition from men, including the producer Ken Riddington. According to Valery, Riddington was "a wonderful man" who had expected the story lines would receive a "romantic treatment". "I was for guts and so was Jill," Valery recalled. "[Riddington] had no idea he'd taken on these two vipers!" Hyem said; "We were always fighting with men over some storyline. I remember we wanted to write a story about lesbians in the camp and after some conflict we were allowed to – so long as we didn't use the word lesbian".

Hyem became an active member of the Writers' Guild of Great Britain (WGGB), and had an interest in promoting women's talents and issues within the profession. She co-founded the Women's Committee to represent areas of women's concern to balance the majority of committees, which were male-dominated. For her works, Hyem was awarded the Guild's Gold Badge in 2007.

== Personal life ==
In 1966, Hyem married Dudley Savill, a Liberal Party parliamentary candidate and social worker. They had a son named Ben and later divorced. In 2011, she was diagnosed with breast cancer. She died in London on 5 June 2015.

== Selected filmography ==
- The Gentle Terror (1961)
- Out of the Shadow (1961)
- Leopard in the Snow (1978)

== Selected radio plays ==
- Sketches for Monday Night at Home (pre-1963)
- Better than Nowhere (1963)
- Parrot Fashion (1964)
- Out of Step (1964)
- Jackpot (1964)
- Jigsaw (1964)
- A Foot in the Door (1965)
- The Dales (with Alan Downer) (1965–1969)
- Once Bitten (1966)
- Third Girl Wanted (1967)
- Evening Out (1967)
- Dear Girls (serial, with Andrew Sachs) (1968)
- The Ropewalk (with Alan Downer]) (1969)
- Waggoners Walk (with Alan Downer) (1969–1979)
- The Winds of Heaven (Monica Dickens) (1971)
- Kate & Emma (Monica Dickens) (1972)
- A Shape like Piccadilly (1971) (Anne Stallybrass)
- Swap (1972)
- Recess (1973)
- Equal Terms (1973)
- Bang, Bang You're Dead (Muriel Spark) (1974)
- Thank You (1974)
- Now She Laughs, Now She Cries (1975)
- Dog in a Manger (1976)
- Blight (1977)
- Remember Me (Giles Cooper Award) (1978)
- Look at Mr. Punch (1979)
- Buzz (1979)
- Footsteps (1979)
- Tick Tock (1979)
- Marking Time (1980)
- Look at Mr. Punch (1980)
- A Case to be Answered (1981)
- Three Piece Sweet (with J. Phillips) (1982)
- Origami (Spine Chillers series) (1983)
- Humanisation of George Mayhew (1984)
- Where are you, Juliet? (adapted from the novel by Rosemary Timperley) (1987)
- The Years Between (Daphne du Maurier) (1995)
- Death Drop (B. M. Gill)(1996)
- No Signposts in the Sea (Vita Sackville-West) (1998)
- Past Refrain (1999)
- Life Sentence (2001)
- The Mind's Eye (2002)
- The Road to Lichfield (Penelope Lively) (2002)
- Down, Down, Down You Go (2005)
- Backtrack (2007)
