= Wish Me Luck =

British WW2 espionage television series

- Created by: Jill Hyem; Lavinia Warner
- Directed by: Gordon Flemyng series 1 Bill Hays series 2 & 3
- Starring: Kate Buffery; Suzanna Hamilton; Lynn Farleigh; Jane Asher; Julian Glover; Michael J. Jackson; Jane Snowden
- Opening theme: J'attends un navire (Hymne der Resistance) by Kurt Weill
- Composer: Jim Parker
- Country of origin: United Kingdom
- Original language: English
- No. of series: 3
- No. of episodes: 23

Production
- Executive producer: Nick Elliott
- Producer: Michael Chaplin
- Running time: 51 mins
- Production company: LWT

Original release
- Network: ITV
- Release: 17 January 1988 – 25 February 1990

Wish Me Luck is a British television drama about the exploits of civilian women who became undercover agents in Occupied France during the Second World War. The series was made by London Weekend Television for the ITV network between 17 January 1988 and 25 February 1990 and created by Lavinia Warner and Jill Hyem, who had previously produced and written the BBC women prisoner of war series Tenko. The series was filmed on location in England and France.

Wish Me Luck is similar to Tenko and the 1970s BBC drama Secret Army, in that it deals with strong female characters coping under extreme conditions in wartime. The organisation for which the series' women agents worked, the Outfit, was based on the real-life Special Operations Executive. Season 1 and 2 were based on the exploits of SOE agent Nancy Wake and much of the dialogue was copied from her autobiography The White Mouse.

The series also addressed social issues and divisions under wartime conditions. A great deal of attention was also paid to creating the social context of the operatives, the drama of their work, against the backdrop of an intensely detailed local "colour" in both wartime Britain and France.

"Wish Me Luck (as You Wave Me Goodbye)" is a song made popular during the Second World War by Gracie Fields.

== Principal cast and crew ==
The first series centred around the exploits of two recruits:

- Kate Buffery as Liz Grainger / Celeste
- Suzanna Hamilton as Matty Firman / Aimee

Also starring:

- Jane Asher as Faith Ashley
- Julian Glover as Colonel Cadogan
- Michael J. Jackson as Kit Vanston / Gregoire
- Jeremy Northam as Colin Beale / Cyrano
- Shelagh McLeod as Claudine de Valois
- Warren Clarke as Colonel Werner Krieger
- Lynn Farleigh as Vivien Ashton / Solange
- Catherine Schell as Virginia Mitchell / Dominique
- Jeremy Nicholas as Lewis Lake / Antoine
- Mark Anstee as Luc Ferrier
- Trevyn McDowell as Yvette

The second series includes:

- Jane Snowden as Emily Whitbread

The third and final series, which was based on the 1944 Vercors rebellion, saw Jane Snowden joined by Catherine Schell, Jeremy Nicholas and, in one of her first television roles, Shirley Henderson. Running the 'Outfit' back in London were Jane Asher and Julian Glover. Other key characters were played by Terrence Hardiman, Jeremy Northam, Stuart McGugan, Felicity Montagu, Mark Anstee, Trevor Peacock and Nigel Le Vaillant.

There were 23 episodes in all. The first series was directed by Gordon Flemyng, the second and third series by Bill Hays.

== Plot ==
=== Series 1 ===
Episode 1 opens with Liz Grainger, codename Celeste (Buffery) apparently undergoing violent German interrogation. It transpires that this is part of her training for 'The Outfit', a secret organisation run by Colonel James 'Cad' Cadogan (Glover) and Faith Ashley (Asher), who are now recruiting civilians to boost their numbers. The rest of the episode combines scenes of Liz's training to go to France as an undercover agent - and that of fellow recruit Mathilde (Matty) Firman, codename Aimee (Hamilton) - with flashbacks showing how they came to be recruited. Matty is a factory worker from Stepney, who escaped to London from France with her French mother early in the war and is steered to The Outfit by an officer who witnesses her at a dance slapping a man for calling the French collaborators. She is desperate to contribute more effectively to the war effort because of her French and Jewish heritage. Liz, whose husband is serving overseas and whose brother Jack has recently been killed in the war, has moved to Devon with her daughter Vicky to escape the Blitz. She is recruited almost by accident, following her response to a radio appeal for French holiday snaps to help the war effort (in circumstances resembling those of the recruitment of real life agent Odette Hallowes). Liz initially refuses to undertake work which would entail leaving her daughter but is persuaded by Cad to undergo training, in which she does well, and becomes determined to volunteer. Cad overrides the reservations of some of his colleagues about sending civilian women (particularly a mother) to France and recommends her as a courier. Also to be sent is former actor, Colin Beale, codename Cyrano (Northam) whom Liz and Matty have befriended during training. In contrast Matty, despite excelling in her training as a wireless operator, is rejected for undercover work: her talkative nature makes her a security risk.

In Episode 2, Matty has returned to Stepney and the factory, but Cad is regretting rejecting her since their recruitment pool is dwindling. He relents and calls Matty back, initially for wireless receiving ("godfather") work in England, where she makes friends with fellow-trainee Lois Mountjoy (Abigail McKern). Liz is now at the final stage of training, and Matty makes the most of her second chance by being top of the class. Meanwhile, Cad, Faith and their colleagues discuss the worsening situation in 'Area 3', around Brague. Kit Vanston, codename Gregoire (Jackson), the resident agent out there, is convinced that the Germans are planning a major operation in the dock area but can do nothing without back-up. There are doubts about the local Communists and resistance and messages coming through are virtually unreadable because Kit doesn't have a wireless operator. Liz and Colin are to be rushed out there to help - Liz has a childhood friend, Claudine De Valois, as a contact in the area. News from the training school is that Matty is the only wireless trainee at the standard required to go into the field and she is added to the team. Lois is to act as her "godmother" at home. The three are briefed, say their goodbyes and prepare to leave immediately.

At the outset of Episode 3, Liz, Matty and Colin have arrived by plane in Area 3 where they are met by members of the communist resistance, headed by Maurice (Vincenzo Nicoli), and to their astonishment, local villagers, revealing worryingly lax security arrangements. Maurice directs Colin to the docks and Liz and Matty to Kit Vanston's hideout. Liz engineers things so that she meets Kit first; she has met him before as he was a friend of her brother's. He is abrasive and contemptuous that the new courier and wireless operator are women. After some difficulty finding an appropriate billet, Matty establishes herself in her cover identity as a district nurse. However, she has trouble getting a transmission through and ends up staying on air long enough for her radio location to be pinpointed by a German detector van. German troops burst into her billet and begin to search.

In episode 4, Matty prepares to face the German raid, while Liz connects with her friend Claudine (Shelagh McLeod), whose chateau home has been taken over by the Germans, headed by Colonel Krieger (Clarke). Claudine is running a makeshift library and making herself as pleasant as she can to Krieger. Liz arrives while Claudine is entertaining the Colonel but they manage to stage a reasonably convincing impromptu reunion in front of him; Claudine eventually agrees to help Liz, who gets acclimatised to her new life as a courier. Liz and Kit bond over their respective recent bereavements (Kit's wife and children have been killed in the Blitz). Meanwhile, Colin is spying successfully at the docks and Matty is called in for routine questioning by the Germans. She apparently puts on a convincing display for Krieger but after she has gone he gives orders for her to be watched.

By Episode 5, the strain of being behind enemy lines is starting to tell. Cad is informed of a British operation planned for Brague which his operatives will be expected to support. Colin is exhausted. Liz has to flee from a German spot-check; she and Kit grow closer. Matty, bored and frustrated, recklessly dyes her hair a conspicuous red. When Liz is taken ill Claudine takes her place passing information to Matty. Cad plans for Liz to go back to London to brief in person, as Matty's transmissions are troubled by poor reception. Kit orders Matty to ask Cad to send a replacement for Liz so Liz need not come back to France, and later confesses to Liz it is because he has fallen for her. Claudine pumps Krieger's mistress, Therese, for information and discovers that Krieger has found out about the plane coming to get Liz - his men will be waiting. She rushes to Matty who transmits it in the nick of time for Cad to cancel the operation so Liz is not caught. However Krieger realises that it must have been Claudine who passed the information to the British and offers her a deal: either she turns double agent or he will hand her over to the Gestapo.

Episode 6 sees Liz arrive back safely in London after a rescheduled pick-up to find that her husband, Laurence (Le Vaillant), is also due home at any minute. Cad offers her a job in London since she will not be going back to France and asks her to brief Nigel Piggott, codename Alain, the sabotage expert who is to replace her in Area 3. Matty's mother (who appears to be suffering from post-traumatic stress disorder) realises Matty is in France when Liz visits her, bringing a gift of French perfume from Matty. Liz and Laurence's reunion proves to be rather stilted; back home in Devon, Liz puts an injured rabbit out of its misery by killing it with a rock, prompting Laurence to question what her war work is. He is aghast when she tells him the truth. Unknown to the remaining team in France, Claudine has yielded to Krieger's threats and in return for a promise of safety for herself and Liz, gives information about Matty, including drawing a sketch of her, which Krieger immediately recognises as the district nurse. Colin and Matty jump into bed together as a ruse when the Germans raid just after Matty has been transmitting, and end up sleeping together for real. The following morning, the Germans come back, having recognised Matty from Claudine's sketch. Matty puts up a spirited fight but is captured.

In Episode 7, Matty is imprisoned and brought before Krieger for interrogation. Krieger knows about her codename, role, and even about Cad. Matty refuses to cooperate, avoiding Krieger's attempts to trap her into giving information about the other agents. However, she can't resist gloating that Celeste is safe in England, belying Claudine's continued attempts to convince Krieger that Liz is innocent. Krieger forces Claudine to collect messages by threatening to reveal her betrayal of Matty to the resistance (who would kill her) and puts one of his men to undertake Matty's transmissions. Lois, receiving the messages, attempts to convince her superiors that it is not Matty's 'touch' but her warning is ignored. Eventually she persuades Cad to attempt a trap which turns out to be inconclusive. He decides he has to send an agent in to find out if their arrangements are still secure before the planned operation. Liz, whose marriage has become strained because Laurence cannot handle the fact that his wife's war work has been more active than his own, agrees to go back to France, much to the horror of both Faith and Laurence. She has a passionate reunion with Kit, who has just found out via Claudine that Matty is in German hands. Matty is taken from her cell by the Gestapo.

Episode 8 opens with scenes of Matty being tortured. Krieger intervenes, knowing that he can only save his own career by getting Matty's confession himself. Later, Krieger's commanding officer makes it clear that Krieger must deliver from Matty the name of the leading British agent in the area... or else. Liz arrives back at Claudine's and quickly realises Claudine betrayed Matty. Kit gets a message to London to confirm Matty's capture, and plans to break Matty out of Gestapo headquarters, with the help of Maurice and the resistance. Claudine agrees to try to distract Krieger while the rescue is taking place. However, Cad has realised there could be more to be gained by feeding the Germans false information - but the price of that is leaving Matty imprisoned. Matty's mother, convinced that Matty has been captured, commits suicide. Faith is forced to admit to Matty's grandfather that Matty is a prisoner. Kit, Liz, Colin and Nigel finalise their rescue plan but at the last moment orders come from London that they must not attempt rescue. Kit decides to go ahead anyway. Kit and Liz admit their feelings for each other while Colin and Nigel break into Matty's cell. Colin gets Matty out but Nigel is killed as they escape. In the aftermath, Krieger arrests Claudine - but is then himself led away in handcuffs for his own failure. Cad is castigated by his superiors. The series ends with Matty's arrival home to the delight of her grandfather, while Liz heads back to Devon.

=== Series 2 ===
Series 2 opens in Autumn 1943 with the execution by firing squad of three members of 'The Outfit' in South-Western France. Liz is now working alongside Cad and Faith in London, and has the task of contacting the bereaved relatives, including John Ashton's widow, Vivien (Farleigh), while Faith interviews potential young recruit Emily Whitbread (Snowden). Cad receives direct approval from the Prime Minister for the work they are doing, and also gets a visit from Vivien, offering to volunteer herself. Colin has been on a leaders' course, and is to be sent out to head up Area 7. Kit Vanston, for whom Liz clearly still has feelings, is being brought home. Liz helps train the new recruits, but admits to Faith that since hearing Matty has gone back into the field, she is missing being in France herself. Vivien (codename Solange) and Emily (codename Zoe) pass their training and prepare to leave for France with Colin. Emily sleeps with her boyfriend as a final fling. Kit arrives back, after more than a year leading Area 3, and is met by Liz.

In Episode 2, Colin, Vivien and Emily parachute into Area 7, and are met by brusque Outfit agent Gordon, codename Gaspard (Stuart McGugan) and local resistance leader Josef (William Simons), but Colin fractures his ankle in the drop. Emily quickly settles into her billet, posing as a relative of widowed shopkeeper Marie Ferrier (Gillian Raine), whose son Luc (Anstee) has just gone off to join the Maquis, and her father, Leon (John Boswell). Their neighbour Annette (Carmel McSharry) is revealed to be short of money and seems suspicious of Emily. Vivien's cover is as nanny to her wealthy friend Juliet (Bobbie Brown), who lives in a nearby chateau. Liz and Kit's relationship blooms when she helps him settle back home. He updates her on the news from Area 3: Maurice was captured and tortured to death by the Gestapo after she left. Liz's mother guesses Liz is having an affair and warns her not to risk her marriage; Liz tries to break it off with Kit who asks her to marry him. She refuses. Meanwhile, in France, Emily fears she is pregnant, Vivien seems to have a hidden agenda, and Colin rouses the suspicions of a young milice officer. He later finds her searching his rooms and has to shoot her.

Colin is in shock at the beginning of Episode 3. Vivien and Gordon hastily get rid of the milicienne's body. Emily's pregnancy is confirmed, much to Cad's fury, but she decides to have an abortion so as to continue her work. Vivien's secret is revealed: 19 years ago she had a baby in France and released her for adoption; she seeks the help of a priest in trying to trace her - but he appears to be a collaborator. Colin is having a breakdown - much to the contempt of Gordon, who takes temporary charge - and Cad and Faith worry about who can be sent to replace him. Returning home unexpectedly one night, Liz finds Laurence in bed with another woman. He blames her for being a bad wife and mother, which Liz takes to heart, despite her anger that she gave Kit up needlessly to save her marriage; she agrees to Laurence's demand for a divorce and custody of Vicky and volunteers to lead Area 7 herself. Faith summons Kit to talk Liz out of it, but Kit's chauvinist attitude enrages Liz - they row and part on bad terms. Colin escapes to Spain on foot as Liz (with a new codename of Collette) sets off for France.

Episode 4 see Liz arrive in Area 7 where she immediately sets about tightening security. She briefs Gordon that they must disable a U-boat transmitter; they have a resistance contact, Jeanne, working at the base, who arranges for Vivien, under a new identity, to work there as well. Vivien hears from the priest with news of her daughter, Yvette, and disobeys orders to go to Toulouse in search of her. She meets Yvette's adoptive mother but Yvette left home some time ago. Gordon confides his distrust of Vivien to Liz, who finds out about her unauthorised absence and other lapses of security, and takes her to task. Colin has finally got back to England. Cad and Faith visit him in hospital, and then go on to meet their new liaison with the Free French Forces, Paul Daubert. Liz and Gordon finalise their plans to attack the transmitter base unaware that they are walking into a trap: Jeanne has been caught out by the Germans and revealed the raid plans to Sturmbannführer Voller (Donald Gee) of the SD (Sicherheitsdienst) to protect her son. In the resulting shoot-out, Jeanne shouts a last-minute warning and is killed, and Gordon is shot. Liz and Vivien get him out. Josef saves Emily.

Episode 5 reveals the aftermath of the failed raid: Vivien and Liz rush the critically injured Gordon to Marie's for makeshift surgery by a doctor friend of Leon's; Annette's suspicions increase; Liz worries who could have betrayed them while showing her increased mettle as leader. The Germans find Emily's transmitter in a barn, and Liz decides she must move to a new safe house, to the dismay of Marie and Leon who have become very attached to her. Vivien finally gets an address for Yvette (Trevyn McDowell) and goes to visit her without revealing who she is; they get on well, but Vivien is shocked to meet Yvette's boyfriend: a German Wehrmacht lieutenant. Cad gets a visit from his son, about to leave on active service, and then agrees with Paul Daubert that they must send an overall co-ordinator to France. Kit accepts the job with enthusiasm; he has admitted to Colin his frustration at being inactive. First, however, Cad wants Kit to go to Area 7 to help Liz destroy a vital factory, but warns him not to let his feelings for Liz cloud his judgment. Gordon recovers sufficiently to be sent home - hidden in a coffin. Emily lingers too long at Marie's while Leon tries to fix her radio; the Germans raid. Emily escapes but Leon is killed and Marie arrested. She is brought before Voller and faces torture, as Emily and Liz meet to regroup.

By Episode 6, the situation is perilous. Liz gets a message to London via Area 6. Vivien lunches with Yvette - and finds herself socialising with Voller. Emily, now radio-less, and in a new identity, witnesses a badly beaten Marie being forced on a transporter train. She finds Luc in his hideaway to break the news, and also discovers the informer was Annette. Haunted by the sacrifice Marie and Leon have made for her she asks to carry out the reprisal execution of Annette, but finds someone has beaten her to it. Josef tells Liz Vivien has been seen dining out with German officers; Liz orders Emily to message London to request Vivien's immediate removal but unknown to her, Vivien reads the message. Colin has recovered, and Cad tells him Gordon is safe and Liz is doing well. Cad's son is killed in action, and he is grief-stricken; Faith has to take the decision to recall Vivien. Kit arrives in Area 7. Initially shocked, Liz is relieved to have back-up she can trust but is determined to keep things professional; she has become a clear-sighted and capable leader, somewhat to Kit's dismay. Meanwhile, Vivien's continued recklessness catches up with her: Voller has recognised her from a photograph of when she worked at the transmitter base. Vivien confesses to Yvette that she is her mother; Yvette angrily rejects her. As she storms out, Voller and his men arrest them both.

The series climax sees Liz, Kit, Emily and Josef finalising their plans to bomb the factory unaware that Vivien is being questioned by Voller, and about to be handed over to the Gestapo. A German officer, while arranging the necessary transport with a local man, Felix, reveals Vivien is to be sent by car to Bordeaux - but Felix turns out to be part of the resistance. Luc gets his message and rushes to warn Liz that Vivien has been arrested. Liz immediately decides they must ambush the car, and demands a plane from London to get Vivien and Yvette out. Cad organises the plane, but it can only take one person. Liz and Kit break into the factory and set up a booby trap with a grenade. The factory is spectacularly destroyed and they all escape. Now they must rescue Vivien. During the ambush of the car, Voller accidentally kills Yvette when Vivien lunges at him, and is himself killed by Luc. With only seconds to get away, Vivien hysterically refuses to leave Yvette's body. Vivien is risking all their lives; Liz warns her she will shoot her if she has to - and then does. Kit persuades a shaken Liz to take the available place on the plane since the Area 7 unit is finished. Emily prepares to go with Luc into the mountains. Liz and Kit say their goodbyes and Liz flies away.

=== Series 3 ===
The third and final series is based on the actions of the Maquis du Vercors and the events in Vassieux-en-Vercors, though the locations used are given fictional names, such as the village being named Couermont and the plateau "Le Crest".

Jane Snowden, Michael J Jackson, Jane Asher, Stuart McGugan and Mark Anstee all reprise their roles, with agents "Dominique" (Catherine Schell) and "Antoine" (Jeremy Nicholas) joining the cast. The series focuses on the build-up to a planned uprising by the resistance in Le Crest, led to by Renard (Trevor Peacock), with the belief that supplies will soon arrive from Great Britain. However Nicole (Felicity Montagu), a woman who had befriended Emily in the opening moments of the series is feeding all this information to the Nazis and General Stuckler (Terrence Hardiman) orders the resistance to be quashed and troops are parachuted in, leading to a bloody finale. Other notable appearances in this series are Shirley Henderson who plays a young Jewish girl named Sylvie and Glyn Grain who plays Bonnard, the estranged husband of Dominique.

== DVD releases ==
The complete series of Wish Me Luck is available on DVD in both the UK and USA.
