= A Horseman Riding By =

1966–68 book trilogy by R. F. Delderfield

First edition (publ. Hodder & Stoughton)

A Horseman Riding By is a sequence of 3 novels by R. F. Delderfield written between 1966 and 1968. It starts in 1902 at the tail end of the Boer War and is continued in the sequels to end in 1965. The first book is set in Devon in the early 20th century. It was to some extent an elegy for the traditional society which was blown apart by the First World War.

After a three-part radio adaptation broadcast on the BBC Home Service and BBC Radio 4 in 1967, starring William Lucas, Josephine Tewson and Hilda Schroder, the first novel and the World War I portion of the second were dramatised as a 13-part BBC television serial, starring Nigel Havers, Prunella Ransome and Glyn Houston, broadcast on Sunday evenings from 24 September 1978. The series was never repeated on any BBC channel, but was released on DVD in 2004. The BBC did not adapt the remainder of the series of novels, but a few years later they adapted two more of Delderfield's novels, To Serve Them All My Days and Diana.

== Long Summer Day ==
The first novel is Long Summer Day. The novels are all set in south Devon, where the main character, Paul Craddock buys an estate after serving with the Imperial Yeomanry in the Boer War. The first novel covers the years of the long "Edwardian afternoon" after the death of Queen Victoria, including the postponement of the coronation of King Edward VII, the Liberal landslide of 1906 and the coronation of King George V. The story follows the trials and tribulations of Craddock, and later his second wife and their growing family.

== Post of Honour ==
The second novel Post of Honour covers the years from 1914 through to May 1940 with the Dunkirk evacuation. However the first chapter catches up with the main characters and events from 1911 to the outbreak of the First World War in 1914. The second novel finishes with the "Miracle of Dunkirk" with Craddock's eldest son Simon (his son from his brief first marriage) returning safely from France.

== The Green Gauntlet ==
The third and final novel The Green Gauntlet is in two sections. Part one picks up the story of the Craddock family in February 1942 and runs through the rest of the Second World War to the culmination of the D Day landings. The story then takes us on to the end of the war just before V.E. Day. Part two gets underway with the V.E. Day celebrations in May 1945, then follows the Craddock family fortunes through the 1950s and up until the funeral of Sir Winston Churchill in 1965. Paul Craddock dies shortly afterwards.

== BBC television adaptation ==
In 1978, a 13-part television adaptation was broadcast on BBC1. It was produced by Ken Riddington. Part of the filming was undertaken at Bowringsleigh, a Grade I listed Elizabethan house in West Alvington, Devon, England.

Main cast: Nigel Havers, Glyn Houston, Madge Ryan, Pam St Clement, Glyn Owen, Alan Browning, William Moore, Milton Johns, Margaret John, Steve Hodson, Olaf Pooley, Prunella Ransome, David Prowse, Gillian McCutcheon and Fiona Gaunt.
