= Alun Owen =

Welsh playwright, screenwriter and actor (1925–1994)

- Born: Alun Davies Owen; 24 November 1925; Menai Bridge, Gwynedd, Wales
- Died: 6 December 1994 (aged 69); London, England
- Occupations: Playwright, screenwriter, actor
- Writing career
- Years active: 1959–1990

Alun Davies Owen (24 November 1925 – 6 December 1994) was a Welsh playwright, screenwriter and actor, predominantly in television. However, he is best remembered by a wider audience for writing the screenplay of The Beatles' debut feature film A Hard Day's Night (1964), which earned him an Academy Award nomination for Best Original Screenplay. BFI Screenonline called him “one of the leading voices of 1960s British television, when it was a writers' medium.”

== Career ==
Owen was born in Menai Bridge and his family moved to Liverpool when he was 8. His father, Sidney Owen, was a Welshman from Dolgellau, North Wales, and his mother, Ruth, was from Holyhead, but of Irish descent. Alun Owen attended St Michael in the Hamlet Anglican Primary School and Oulton High School. For two years during the Second World War, he worked in a coal mine as a "Bevin Boy", before moving into repertory theatre as an assistant stage manager. From there he moved into acting, first with the Birmingham Repertory Company and then various other companies, appearing in small roles in films and to a greater degree in the newer medium of television during the 1950s.

By the late 1950s, however, Owen was beginning to realise that his real ambitions lay in writing rather than performing, and he began to submit scripts to BBC Radio. His first full-length play, Progress to the Park, was produced by the Theatre Royal, Stratford East following its radio debut, and later in the West End.

A second play, The Rough and Ready Lot, received its stage debut on 1 June 1959 in a production by the 59 Theatre Company at the Lyric Opera House, Hammersmith directed by Caspar Wrede and with a cast including Ronald Harwood, June Brown, Jack MacGowran, Patrick Allen, and Alan Dobie. It was adapted for television by Charles Lawrence and broadcast by the BBC in September 1959 with the original cast, having previously been heard on the Third Programme.

His next play was his first to be written directly for television. Titled No Trams to Lime Street (1959), the Liverpool-set piece was presented in ABC Weekend TV's Armchair Theatre anthology strand, for which Owen continued to write plays into the 1960s. He also made his feature film scriptwriting debut in 1960, penning The Criminal from a storyline originally by Jimmy Sangster.

In 1961, Owen won both the Guild of Television Producers and Directors' Writer's Award and Scriptwriter's Award. He also won the Writers' Guild of Great Britain 1961 Best Original Teleplay award for The Rose Affair, which in 1968 was adapted as a television opera with music by Norman Kay.

In 1964, when director Richard Lester was hired to direct The Beatles' first film, he remembered Owen from their previous work together on Lester's ITV television programme The Dick Lester Show in 1955. The Beatles were keen on Owen, impressed with his depiction of Liverpool in "No Trams to Lime Street"; Owen spent some time associating with the band's four members to gain an ear for their characters and manners of speech. His resulting script for A Hard Day's Night earned him a nomination for the 1965 Academy Award for Writing Original Screenplay. In the same year, Owen contributed the libretto for a West End musical, composer Lionel Bart's Maggie May. The show ran for 501 performances at London's Adelphi Theatre.

Television continued to be his main medium, however, and he concentrated on single plays in anthology series such as BBC2's Theatre 625. An episode of ITV's Saturday Night Theatre, three linked plays under the title "The Male of the Species" (1969).

His 1974 play Lucky was a rare television representation of Britain's new multicultural reality and described a young black man's (Paul Barber), search for identity. He carried on writing for television through the 1970s and 1980s, with his final produced work being an adaptation of R. F. Delderfield's novel Come Home, Charlie, and Face Them for ITV in 1990.

== Death ==
Owen died in London in 6 December 1994 at the age of 69.

== Legacy ==
A festival was held in Owen's honour from 19–21 October 2006 in Liverpool, arranged by the Merseyside Welsh Heritage Society. A lecture in English on Owen and the Liverpool Welsh was delivered by D. Ben Rees, Chairman of the Society, and in Welsh by Arthur Thomas of University of Liverpool on his life and work. These lectures were published in book form in 2007.

== Writing credits ==
Production	Notes	Broadcaster
The Rough and Ready Lot	Stage play and television film (1959)	Lyric Opera House, Hammersmith; BBC1
The Criminal	Feature film (1960)	N/A
BBC Sunday-Night Play	"The Ruffians" (1960)	BBC1
Thirty-Minute Theatre	"Dare to Be Daniel" (1962)	ITV
Armchair Theatre	"No Trams to Lime Street" (1959); "After the Funeral" (1960); "Lena, O My Lena" (1960); "The Way of Love" (1961); "The Rose Affair" (1961); "The Hard Knock" (1962)	ITV
Corrigan Blake	"You Can't Win Them All" (1962); "Let's Go Home" (1963); "The Removal Men" (1963); "The Scientific Approach" (1963); "The Liberty Takers" (1963); "Lady Bird" (1963); "Love Bird" (1963)	BBC1
You Can't Win 'Em All	Television film (1962)	ABC
Playdate	"You Can't Win 'Em All" (1963)	ITV
The Stag	Television film (1963)	BBC1
First Night	"The Strain" (1963); "A Local Boy" (1963)	BBC1
A Hard Day's Night	Feature film (1964)	N/A
A Local Boy	Television film (1964)	ABC
Theatre 625	"No Trams to Lime Street" (1965); "A Little Winter Love" (1965); "The Loser" (1967); "The Winner" (1967); "The Fantasist" (1967)	BBC2
Thirty-Minute Theatre	"The Other Fella" (1966); "The Wake" (1967)	BBC2
The Ronnie Barker Playhouse	"Tennyson" (1968); "Ah, There You Are" (1968); "Alexander" (1968)	ITV
Half Hour Story	"Shelter" (1967); "George's Room" (1967); "Stella" (1968); "Thief" (1968)	ITV
For Amusement Only	"Time for the Funny Walk" (1968)	ITV
The Company of Five	"Gareth" (1968)	ITV
Male of the Species	Television film (1969)	ITV
Hark at Barker	15 episodes (1969–1970)	ITV
Plays of Today	"The Ladies: Doreen" (1969); "The Ladies: Joan" (1969)	BBC2
The Wednesday Play	"Charlie" (1968); "No Trams to Lime Street" (1970)	BBC1
ITV Sunday Night Theatre	"Park People" (1969); "MacNeil" (1969); "Cornelius" (1969); "Emlyn" (1969); "Giants and Ogres" (1971); "The Web" (1972); "The Piano Player" (1972)	ITV
The Ten Commandments	"Hilda" (1971)	ITV
Play for Today	"Pal" (1971)	BBC1
ITV Playhouse	"Funny" (1971); "Lucky" (1974); "Norma" (1974)	ITV
ITV Sunday Night Drama	"The Web" (1972); "Forget -Me- Knot" (1976)	ITV
Joy	Television film (1972)	BBC2
Once Upon a Time	"Buttons" (1973)	
Forget Me Not	6 episodes (1976)	ITV
The Look	Television film (1978)	
Do You Remember?	"Park People" (1978)	ITV
Kisch Kisch	Television film (1983)	BBC2
The Play on One	"Unexplained Laughter" (1989)	BBC1
Come Home, Charlie, and Face Them	Television miniseries (1990)	ITV

== Awards and nominations ==
Year	Award	Category	Nominated work	Result
1962	WGGB Awards	Best Original Teleplay	Armchair Theatre	Won
1965	Academy Awards	Best Original Screenplay	A Hard Day's Night	Nominated

== Sources ==
- Vahimagi, Tise. "Owen, Alun (1925–1994)". Screenonline. British Film Institute. Archived from the original on 7 September 2009.
