= Anne Valery =

English screenwriter, author and actress (1926–2013)

- Born: Anne Firth; 24 February 1926; Hampstead, London, England
- Died: 29 April 2013 (aged 87); London, England
- Occupations: Actress; Author; Screenwriter
- Years active: 1949–1986
- Spouse: Nanos Valaoritis
- Children: 1

Anne Valery (née Firth) (24 February 1926 – 29 April 2013) was an English screenwriter, author and actress noted for co-writing episodes for the BAFTA-nominated drama Tenko in the early 1980s. The daughter of actress Doriel Paget, she joined the Auxiliary Territorial Service in World War II and later became part of Fitzrovia's literary scene, establishing friendships with several writers. After modelling on the Paris and London catwalks and working as a producer's secretary, Valery began a career in acting in 1949 but was unable to establish a career in this field and turned to presenting on television for the BBC and Associated-Rediffusion.

She operated a secondhand shop by the late 1960s and wrote two volumes of autobiography at the encouragement of her partner Robin Jacques. Valery also wrote television scripts for soap operas and her career saw progression when the BBC asked her to write for the drama show Angels. There she met fellow writer Jill Hyem and the two were commissioned by the BBC to write episodes for Tenko. Valery later wrote the 1986 drama series Ladies in Charge. She was known as an ardent feminist and was an outspoken member of the Writers' Guild of Great Britain.

== Biography ==
=== Early life and education ===
She was born Anne Firth on 24 February 1926 in Hampstead, London. She was the daughter of singer and actress Doriel Paget while her father Colin was not present in her life. Valery had a dislike of schools; she attended four of them with one being a finishing school and was incorrectly diagnosed as dyslexic. Just before she turned 18, and after she left school, she had a stint in the United States Army, after she was not allowed by her father to take up painting at the Slade in Oxford. Valery later joined the Auxiliary Territorial Service, and was taught commando tactics such as parachute jumping behind enemy lines and twisting a bayonet to cause the maximum amount of injury. Valery later became employed as a secretary for the United States Army before joining the intelligence unit of the British Army. She could not put the skills she learned into practice when she became aware of the Surrender of Japan. After the war, Valery became part of the literary Fitzrovia scene after filling in forms at the Royal Army Educational Corps in Notting Hill and established friendships with several writers. She met the Greek poet Nanos Valaoritis and the two married soon after. Valery adopted a derivative version of his surname, and the two rented a flat in Chelsea. She gave birth to a son who died at the age of five and the marriage was later dissolved. Valery remarried and divorced a second time.

=== Career ===
She modelled on the catwalks of Paris and London before finding work as a producer's secretary at the BBC, and established the publicity department of Mothercare. Valery's acting career began in 1949 by winning a role in the Sid Field comedy Cardboard Cavalier, and portrayed the mistress of Ascoyne D'Ascoyne (Alec Guinness) in Kind Hearts and Coronets that same year. She then went to the Rank Charm School and took small roles in films such as What the Butler Saw and King of the Underworld, ( billed as Anne Valerie), and One Way Out, between 1950 and 1955. However, Valery's career in acting was not established, so she gave her attention to presenting on television, working for the ITV company Associated-Rediffusion and on afternoon programmes for the BBC. She later worked as an assistant to the editor of The Observer's home page and as a mechanic/deckhand on a charter boat operating in the Mediterranean.

By the late 1960s, Valery operated a second-hand shop that sold clothes and bric-a-brac in West London's Portobello Road. Her partner Robin Jacques (the brother of the actress Hattie Jacques) encouraged her to write two volumes of autobiography: Baron Von Kodak, Shirley Temple and Me (1976) and The Edge of Smile (1977). Valery became settled as a full-time writer in the mid 1970s by not only writing her autobiography volumes but wrote scripts for the television soaps Crossroads and Emmerdale, as well as the play The Passing Out Parade in August 1979 and the comedy play Nanny Knows Best in October 1980. She contributed to the biography of her friend Quentin Crisp, The Stately Homo. Valery's script for The Passing Out Parade created issues for the six male directors who told her that women did not speak in that manner and that the drama was considered "too difficult" for early 1970s television. Her career progressed when the BBC asked her to write episodes for the drama show about student nurses Angels. It was during the production of the show that Valery began a friendship with fellow writer Jill Hyem.

Valery and Hyem were commissioned by the BBC to write episodes for the BAFTA-nominated drama Tenko (1981–1985) after the first two episodes had been written by a male. During the writing of Tenko, Valery and Hyem faced opposition for their female points of view from men, including the producer Ken Riddington. Riddington, "a wonderful man" according to Valery, had expected the story lines would receive a more "romantic treatment". The year after the final episode of Tenko was broadcast, she assisted Hyem in writing a feature-length episode, Tenko Reunion, for which Valery wrote the accompanying novel. Valery later wrote the 1986 drama series Ladies in Charge which was about an employment agency established after World War I to aid women leaving the front lines with their independence.

=== Other activities and death ===
Valery was an ardent feminist; she was firm in her political beliefs and was involved in opposition to Greece's military junta. She was vehemently opposed to capital punishment which prompted her to once refuse to disembark from a cruise ship in Los Angeles to protest the local Californian laws. Valery had involvement with the Writers' Guild of Great Britain and served on its council, becoming one of its outspoken members over its traditional views and censorship. She died in London on 29 April 2013. The London School of Economics holds a collection relating to Valery in the library's catalogue. They include her personal papers and photographs relating to her career.

== Filmography ==
| Year | Title | Role | Notes |
|---|---|---|---|
| 1949 | Cardboard Cavalier | Hope | |
| 1949 | Stop Press Girl | Heroine in cinema sequence | Uncredited |
| 1949 | Marry Me | Girl in David's Office | Uncredited |
| 1949 | Kind Hearts and Coronets | The Girl in the Punt | |
| 1950 | The Astonished Heart | Waitress | Uncredited |
| 1950 | What the Butler Saw | Elaine | |
| 1952 | King of the Underworld | Susan | |
| 1952 | Folly to Be Wise | WRAC | Uncredited |
| 1955 | One Way Out | Carol Martin | |
| 1989 | The Angry Earth | Mrs. Penry Jones | (final film role) |
