= Patricia Lawrence =

British actress (1925–1993)

Patricia Lawrence (19 November 1925, Andover, Hampshire – 7 March 1993, Chelsea, London) was a British actress.

== Personal life ==
In 1947 she married writer and arts administrator Greville Poke (1912–2000) in the City of Westminster. Lawrence and Poke had two sons, Christopher Frederick Lawrence Poke and musician James John Lawrence Poke. She died in 1993, aged 67 years, in Chelsea.

== Career ==
She was well known for playing the formidable Sister Ulrica, a Dutch prisoner of war in the BBC television series drama Tenko and Ellie Herries in the BBC television drama To Serve Them All My Days (TV series).

== Filmography ==
Year	Title	Role	Notes
1964	Ferry Cross the Mersey	Miss Kneave	
1967–1969	The Wednesday Play	Procla / Hetty / Gillian Player	3 episodes
1971	Softly, Softly	Mrs. Raynes	Episode: "In the Public Gaze"
1973	O Lucky Man!	Clinic Receptionist / Miss Hunter	
1973	The Hireling	Mrs. Hansen	
1973	Van der Valk	Marijke Hoekstra	Episode: "A Man of No Importance"
1973	Upstairs, Downstairs	Mrs. Kenton	Episode: "A Change of Scene"
1974	Intimate Strangers	Joan Paynter	13 episodes
1974	Seven Faces of Woman	Nellie	Episode: "St Martin's Summer"
1976	Our Mutual Friend	Mrs. Wilfer	2 episodes
1976	Angels	Mrs. Hubbard	Episode: "Accident"
1976	Brimstone and Treacle	Mrs. Amy Bates	Original TV version, 1976, first shown 1987
1979	Telford's Change	Celia Hawkins	4 episodes
1980–1981	To Serve Them All My Days	Ellie Herries	10 episodes
1981–1982	Barriers	Miss Price	12 episodes
1984	The Gentle Touch	Mrs McAvoy	Episode: "Cure"
1985	A Room with a View	Mrs Butterworth	
1987	The Bill	Mrs. Irving	Episode: "Overnight Stay"
1988	A Very Peculiar Practice	Joan Bunn	Episode: "Values of the Family"
1991	Ålder okänd	Barbara Heynes	2 episodes
1991	The House of Eliott	Dowager	1 episode
1992	Howards End	Wedding Guests	
1992	Jeeves and Wooster	Aunt Dahlia	Episode: "Aunt Dahlia"
