= Margot Turner =

British nurse

Dame Margot Turner
- Born: 10 May 1910; Finchley, Middlesex
- Died: 24 September 1993 (aged 83); Brighton, East Sussex
- Military career
- Allegiance: United Kingdom
- Branch: British Army
- Service years: 1937–1968
- Rank: Brigadier
- Commands: Queen Alexandra's Royal Army Nursing Corps (1964–68)
- Conflicts: Second World War: Malayan Campaign; Battle of Singapore
- Awards: Dame Commander of the Order of the British Empire; Royal Red Cross; Mentioned in Despatches
- Other work: Colonel-Commandant Queen Alexandra's Royal Army Nursing Corps (1969–74)

Brigadier Dame Evelyn Marguerite Turner, DBE, RRC (10 May 1910 – 24 September 1993), known as Margot Turner, was a British military nurse and nursing administrator. A prisoner of war during the Second World War, she resumed her career following liberation and served in a succession of foreign postings.

== Nursing career ==
Turner commenced her nursing career as a student nurse in 1931 at St.Bartholomew's Hospital, London. On joining the Queen Alexandra's Imperial Military Nursing Service (QAIMNS) in 1937, Turner was posted initially to Cambridge Military Hospital, at Aldershot and then to India. In 1941 she was posted to Singapore working in Changi hospital and then Alexandra Hospital, until ordered to evacuate before the Japanese invasion.

Turner continued to serve with QAIMNS from 1937 to 1949 and then Queen Alexandra's Royal Army Nursing Corps (QARANC) from 1949 to 1968. She served as Matron-in-Chief of QARANC and Director, Army Nursing Services (1964–68) and was Colonel-Commandant of QARANC from 1969 to 1974.

== Prisoner of war ==
Turner's obituary in The Independent recounted her horrific experiences as a prisoner of war held by the Japanese.

The television series Tenko was created by Lavinia Warner after she had worked as a researcher for the edition of the television programme This Is Your Life which featured Turner, and was convinced of the dramatic potential of the stories of women prisoners of the Japanese.

== Honours ==
- Member of the Order of the British Empire (MBE; 1946)
- Dame Commander of the Order of the British Empire (DBE; 1965)

== Death ==
Turner died at St Dunstan's home for disabled ex-servicemen and women in Brighton, East Sussex on 24 September 1993, aged 83 with nurses and her carer Geoffrey Wilcock present.
