= Cheap Day Return =

Cheap Day Return can refer to:

- Off-Peak Day Return ticket, a type of train ticket
- "Cheap Day Return", a song by Jethro Tull on Aqualung, 1971
- Cheap Day Return (novel) by R. F. Delderfield
