= Martin Landau (impresario) =

Jewish impresario

- Born: October 1924; Berlin
- Died: 16 February 2011 (aged 86)

Martin Landau (October 1924 – 16 February 2011) was a Jewish refugee from Germany who became a theatrical impresario, producing plays and musicals in London's West End.

His family were Jewish jewellers in Berlin. They sent him to England in March 1939 on the Kindertransport, arriving at Victoria Station with a small suitcase and large cello that been broken by Nazis but which he retained for the rest of his life. He was then adopted by a Quaker family in Oxford.

He served in the RAF in North Africa and built a theatre in Wadi Halfa in Sudan. After demobilisation after he war, he trained as a theatre director at RADA.

He was a support of the charitable home for retired actors and actresses, Denville Hall. He left his cello to them and this was subsequently taken to The Repair Shop by Helen Mirren where it was repaired by luthier Rebecca Houghton and then played by Raphael Wallfisch.

== Productions ==
- Serious Charge (1955)
- Worm's Eye View (1954)
- Robert and Elizabeth (1964)
- On the Level (1966)
