= Now and Forever (1956 film) =

British drama by Mario Zampi

- Directed by: Mario Zampi
- Written by: R.F. Delderfield; Michael Pertwee
- Based on: The Orchard Walls by R.F. Delderfield
- Produced by: Mario Zampi
- Starring: Janette Scott; Vernon Gray; Kay Walsh; Jack Warner
- Cinematography: Erwin Hillier
- Edited by: Richard Best
- Music by: Stanley Black
- Production company: Mario Zampi Productions (as Anglofilm)
- Distributed by: Associated British-Pathé (UK)
- Release date: 21 February 1956 (London)
- Running time: 90 minutes
- Country: United Kingdom
- Language: English
- Box office: £157,111

Now and Forever is a 1956 British drama film directed by Mario Zampi and starring Janette Scott, Vernon Gray and Kay Walsh. It was written by R.F. Delderfield and Michael Pertwee based on the 1953 play The Orchard Walls by R.F. Delderfield, and was Scott's first adult role after a career as a child star in Britain. The screenplay concerns an upper-class girl who becomes romantically involved with a garage mechanic, and they head for Gretna Green to elope.

== Plot ==
Set in a market town in central England, Janette Grant is the 17-year-old daughter of a wealthy, divorced couple who's lonely as her father rarely visits and her mother never finds time for her. She comes downstairs, ready to go to a musical performance at school. Expecting her mother to take her and give her support, Janette is upset that she decides to participate in a golf club competition as the slot just opened up.

Mrs. Grant contacts Mellingham Motors to order a lift for Janette. When Mike Pritchard arrives to collect her, he overhears her begging her moral support as she fears she might freeze up. Janette asks him to turn around, but he refuses.

On stage, at first Janette is blocked. Looking out for a friendly face, she spots Mike. His encouragement helps her push past the stage fright, and she performs beautifully. Although the cost was not included, Mike offers to drive her home. On the way, they share info about each other. Mike has finished school and works in his dad's garage doing the grunt work and owns his own car, which he has restored. Janette tells him that she has two terms left and that her dad, who she gets on with well, moved to Ireland after the divorce so she only sees him twice a year.

Mike invites Janette to a dance in the town hall, which she declines as she thought she'd be having dinner with her mother to tell her about the performance. However, she has already gone, and will be out all evening. Janette dresses up, showing up to dance. They are having a good time when a creepy man won't leave her alone, so Mike fights him and they are asked to leave. Mike has Janette back in time so that she can sneak into her mom's without getting caught.

The next morning, her mother cooly states that her dad has died of a heart attack. Although she is devastated, her mother refuses to let her stay home from school and tells her it's best to carry on as normal. Distracted in class, Janette's teacher chastises her and sends her from class. In a saddened stupor, Janelle wanders up the school's tower and Mike follows her up as he'd seen her from a distance. Seeing how unhappy she looks he asks what's wrong and she bursts out with the news about her father, saying he was the only one, but he declares she's not alone anymore and they embrace.

They start seeing each other secretly, although Mike wants to tell Janette's mother so she doesn't take it badly. Janette convinces him to go to Romeo & Juliet in a nearby town. In the meantime, her teacher catches her writing him a love note but the principal decides it's unnecessary to warn Janette's mother.

After seeing the play, the young couple have car trouble so don't arrive until early on Friday morning. Mrs. Grant catches Mike leaving Janette's room as her ankle was twisted and he had to help her in. She overreacts, ultimately she's decided to send her to Toronto the next day.

Mike and Janette sneak off in the night, heading to Scotland to elope. The next night they stay in a small B+B with a nosey owner, who calls the newspaper in the morning. Mike knocks him out and the reporter helps them. As they go, some people help them and others don't. Finally, after losing their car and belongings, they are on foot and in sight of a bridge to Scotland when the police, the press and their parents turn up. They promise to return home if they aren't kept apart and finally they let Mike carry Janette over the border as if it were over the threshold.

== Cast ==
- Janette Scott as Janette Grant
- Vernon Gray as Mike Pritchard
- Kay Walsh as Miss Muir
- Jack Warner as Mr. J. Pritchard
- Pamela Brown as Mrs. Grant
- Charles Victor as Farmer Gilbert
- Marjorie Rhodes as Aggie, the farmer's wife
- Ronald Squire as waiter
- Wilfrid Lawson as Gossage
- Sonia Dresdel as Miss Fox
- David Kossoff as pawnbroker
- Moultrie Kelsall as doctor
- Guy Middleton as Hector
- Michael Pertwee as reporter
- Henry Hewitt as jeweller
- Bryan Forbes as Frisby
- Jean Patterson as Rachel
- Harold Goodwin as lorry driver
- Brian Wilde as policeman
- Thora Hird as maid
- Hattie Jacques as woman in car with dog
- George Woodbridge as policeman named Charlie, uncredited

== Critical reception ==
The Monthly Film Bulletin wrote: "A naive and unabashedly contrived story for the 'older' schoolgirl, played with a certain amount of charm by the young couple, Janette Scott and Vernon Gray. On their journey, however, they are required to meet most of the familiar British "cameo"performers (David Kossoff's pawnbroker, Marjorie Rhodes's farmer's wife, Ronald Squire's waiter, etc.), and this lends a distinct air of predictability to their adventures."

Kine Weekly wrote: "The picture subtly demolishes social barriers as its tender, yet spirited, love story unfolds and treats its sex angle so delicately that not even the scene showing the young unmarried couple sharing a bedroom places its "U" certificate in jeopardy. Janette Scott and Vernon Gray, ideally cast, easily win the audience over to their side as Janette and Mike, Pamela Brown and Jack Warner have their moments as Mrs, Grant and Mr, Pritchard, and no fault can be found with the rest. The backgrounds are breathtaking and the signature tune catchy."

Variety wrote: "Zampi's direction astutely focuses on the young couple and allows the attractive rural setting to make a fitting background. Miss Scott, a young actress of some talent, plays the schoolgirl with a persuasive charm while Vernon Gray typifies the earnest, serious-minded youth. Pamela Brown portrays the mother in an unsympathetic single key. Main sympathy comes from a warm performance by Kay Walsh as the girl's head-mistress. Jack Warner, as always, turns in a reliable study as the boy's unpretentious father."

In British Sound Films: The Studio Years 1928–1959 David Quinlan rated the film as "average", writing: "Wishy-washy romance full of stock characters gains some charm from Scott's fresh performance."

Allmovie called the film "a very slight piece, buoyed by the charm and attractiveness of its young stars. Janette Scott and Vernon Gray...Though the film seems flat and obvious when viewed on television, it truly comes to life before a large and appreciative moviehouse audience. Forgotten for many years, Now and Forever was happily rediscovered by the late film historian William K. Everson in his 1979 book Love in the Film, which was dedicated to star Janette Scott."
