= Margaret Thomson (medical doctor) =

Scottish physician and prisoner of war (1902-1982)

Margaret Thomson MBE
- Born: Margaret Henderson Hunter; 20 August 1902; Leith, Scotland
- Died: 16 June 1982 (aged 79); Huntly, Scotland
- Education: Edinburgh Ladies' College; University of Edinburgh
- Occupation: physician
- Known for: war hero, Japanese prisoner of war

Margaret Henderson Thomson MBE (née Hunter; 20 August 1902 – 16 June 1982) was a Scottish physician, prisoner of war and war hero.

== Biography ==
Thomson was born in Leith in 1902. She went to Edinburgh Ladies' College and then to the University of Edinburgh where she qualified as a doctor in 1926. She married a rubber planter named Alexander Thomson and went to live on Carey Island in what was then British Malaya. She was working as a doctor in Singapore when the city fell to the Japanese army in February 1942. She tended to the wounded as they were the last of the evacuees by sea on the SS Kuala on 13 February 1942. The medical staff were ordered to evacuate despite having to leave wounded behind. They took to lifeboats when the ship came under attack, but as there were only two lifeboats many staff and patients were in the water, where they were strafed by Japanese planes. Thomson had to swim but was later pulled into a lifeboat. The lifeboats made it to Kabat Island and they then moved on to Senajang Island. She tended to the wounded and rowed the lifeboat despite a leg wound. They were using wood splints and washing wounds in sea water. She arranged evacuation of the wounded to Singkep Island and this in time included herself with a septic leg wound. She went on to Sumatra where she was imprisoned in Japanese camps. The guards stole the Red Cross parcels and she saw her fellow inmates die.

Her husband had also been mistreated as a slave labourer building the railways. They recovered in Edinburgh before returning to Malaya. However, due to the unrest in the country, they returned to Scotland and bought a farm. Thomson's husband died in 1971.

The BBC consulted Thomson for the television series Tenko which portrayed life in Japanese work camps. She did not like to talk about her experiences and she never watched the programmes.

Thomson died in Huntly in Scotland in 1982.

== Awards and honours ==
She was awarded an MBE for her efforts in 1943, although at that time she was still a prisoner.
