= The Spring Madness of Mr. Sermon =

1963 novel by R. F. Delderfield

- First edition
- Author: R. F. Delderfield
- Language: English
- Genre: Novel
- Publisher: Hodder & Stoughton
- Publication date: 1963
- Publication place: United Kingdom
- ISBN: 9780552089814

The Spring Madness of Mr. Sermon is a 1963 novel by British author R. F. Delderfield, first published by Hodder & Stoughton. It was published in the United States in 1970 by Simon & Schuster under the title Mr. Sermon.

== Plot summary ==
At the age of 49, schoolmaster Sebastian Sermon has become vaguely dissatisfied with his life. Distant from his wealthy, ten-years-younger wife, Sybil, and teenage children, he works competently at his ill-paid job at a boys' preparatory school. One spring afternoon, he reacts to a schoolboy prank by repeatedly hitting the perpetrator. The headmaster hears the commotion and breaks things up. The headmaster is willing to hush things up, but Sermon defends himself, throws up his job and goes home.

Rebuffed by his wife sexually (though she immediately regrets it), he takes a few belongings, and sets out, he knows not where. He takes a bus to London and then a train to the West Country. He meets up with a junk/antique dealer, Tapper, on the road and helps him out with his trade (for which Sermon proves to have quite a knack), and goes with him to the fictitious upscale Devon seaside resort of Kingsbay.

Sermon captivates several women, first a barmaid, and then his Kingsbay landlady, Olga Boxall. When Sermon and Boxall take a bus excursion, and when the bus driver is injured, Sermon must drive the bus back to Kingsbay. That evening, the two have sex—and Boxall, who has long figured out that Sermon is married, leaves the next day on a trip to give the two time to figure out if they are right for each other, while renting her house to Sermon.

Sermon saves a little girl from drowning, whose nanny (who is immediately discharged) is a young woman he's met before in his time at Kingsbay and in fact briefly taught at his school. The woman, Rachel Grey, proves to be the daughter of the headmaster of Barrowdene, a (fictitious) highly regarded public school near to Kingsbay. She brings him to the school to meet her father, and Sermon and Headmaster Fred Grey hit it off, while Sermon feels very much at home at the school. Upon his return from the school, Sermon finds a policeman waiting for him—his using a cheque to pay for the rent has alerted Sybil to his location. Sermon tells the policeman that he will mail a letter to his wife, which he does.

Sermon's heroics bring him to the attention of the town authorities, who hire him to supervise the various public works by the shore, including the pay toilets, and he gets the Town Clerk to hire Rachel Grey to run the small zoo. Sermon's summer settles into a routine; days supervising foreshore operations with lunch with Rachel Grey, Saturdays at Barrowdene, Sunday running the antique shop.

Things are rudely interrupted when Sermon, rescuing a woman from a pay toilet with a jammed lock, finds his wife and daughter staring at him. He has lunch with his wife, and says they need to make a new start in someplace like Kingsbay. Sybil is taken aback by Sermon's new confidence, but is unwilling to move from the London area. She returns home with her daughter. Rachel Grey, who observed part of the tête à tête between the spouses, later behaves sexually provocatively towards Sermon. Sermon, fearing the effect both on his relationship with her, and with Fred Grey, does not take up the invitation. Sermon returns to his routine, now and then teaching a class or two at Barrowdene.

The Headmaster offers Sermon a job teaching at Barrowdene, and gives him time to think about it, telling Sermon that his prospects would be much brighter if he could persuade Sybil to join him. Boxall simplifies Sermon's romantic life somewhat by sending a letter indicating that she has become infatuated with another tourist, and later, offering to sell her house.

He informs Sybil by phone. She is hostile to the idea, but willing to talk it over if Sermon comes home. In fact, she has a male friend over, Scott-James, who volunteers to go down to Kingsbay and seek evidence towards a divorce. Against her better judgment, Sybil agrees. Scott-James arrives, and takes photographs of Sermon and Rachel in Sermon's Kingsbay house together—for Sermon has had Rachel spend the night (in separate bedrooms) after the two were soaked after a flood at the zoo. When Scott-James introduces himself, and states the purpose of his business, Sermon punches him, and confiscates and burns the film, and, after Scott-James staggers off, Sermon has sex with Rachel. Tired of being ruled by events, Sermon sets out to his home and Sybil.

Realizing that he owns the family home, Sermon sells the house to his mother in law, and accepts Boxall's offer to sell her house to him. Sermon confronts his wife and tells her this, and when the enraged Sybil stabs him with nail scissors, he (as suggested by his mother in law) spanks her. This clears the air, and the two reconcile, and consummate their renewed relationship.

A short epilogue looks ahead to Sermon's fiftieth birthday. Sermon is immersed in his duties at Barrowdene. Sybil is pregnant with their third child. Fred Gray makes Sermon a housemaster, and Sybil is much more acquiescent to the prospect of moving from Kingsbay to the school grounds than she was about the first move.
