= Gillian McCutcheon =

British actress (born 1939)

- Born: Gillian Patricia McCutcheon; April 1939 (age 87); England
- Partner: Roger Brierley (?–1996)
- Children: 1

Gillian McCutcheon (born April 1939) is a British-based actress who has appeared in many programmes over the years. She has played three parts in the ITV Television drama The Bill. Her first role was The Avengers, in 1961. She also played the unseen therapist in the 1990s series This Life. Other credits include The Brothers, Dixon of Dock Green, Blake's 7, Thriller, A Horseman Riding By, Emmerdale, London's Burning and Holby City. She also was one of three judges in Series 3 episode 4 of Inspector Lindley Mysteries. She is a senior member of London Arts Discovery. She attended Romford County High School for Girls in the 1950's.

== Personal life ==
She was in a relationship with the actor Roger Brierley until 1996, they have a son together.
