= Fiona Gaunt =

English actress

- Born: Fiona Elizabeth Keet-Gaunt; 25 May 1947 (age 78); Beirut, Lebanon

Fiona Elizabeth Keet-Gaunt (born 25 May 1947) is an English actress and the mother of actress Genevieve Gaunt.

== Personal life ==
According to a 1972 newspaper profile, Gaunt was born in Beirut to Scottish Presbyterian parents and lived in Uganda until she was 16. In 1985 she met the Dutch actor Frederik de Groot. Their daughter, Genevieve, was born in January 1991.

== Career ==
Fiona Gaunt trained at the London Academy of Music and Dramatic Art, graduating in 1969. She subsequently played opposite Anthony Hopkins - as Hélène Kuragina, wife of Pierre Bezukhov - in the BBC's 1972 production of War and Peace. She then starred as psychiatrist Helen Smith in the 1973 science fiction series Moonbase 3. To prepare for her role, Gaunt studied tapes of the Apollo missions.

Gaunt appeared in a 1973 episode of the comedy series Sykes, playing an upper-class girl who tricks Eric Sykes' character into getting engaged. She had a handful of roles in The Two Ronnies, including as a stowaway in their spoof of The Onedin Line, and starred as Grace Lovell in the 1978 TV adaptation of A Horseman Riding By. She was also in the first production of Tom Stoppard's 1979 play, Undiscovered Country.

== Filmography ==
Year	Format	Title	Role
1978	TV series	A Horseman Riding By	Grace Lovell.
1973	TV series	Moonbase 3	Dr. Helen Smith.
1973	TV series	The Two Ronnies.	Various roles.
1973	TV series	Sykes: An Engagement.	
1973	TV series	Justice: Malicious Damage	Diana Blumenthal
1972	TV series	War and Peace.	Hélène Kuragina.
1971	Miniseries	Cousin Bette	Leonie.
1970	Anthology Series	Tales of Unease	Girl

== Selected stage credits ==
- The Wizard of Oz - Yvonne Arnaud Theatre, Guildford: 1969-70
- Murder in the Cathedral - Canterbury Cathedral: 1970
- Undiscovered Country - Oliver Theatre, London: 1979
- The Bedbug - Gate Theatre, London: 1980
