= Jeananne Crowley =

Actor and playwright

Jeananne Crowley (born 18 December 1949) is an Irish actress and writer who has worked in Irish theatre and in British film and television. She appeared in the film Educating Rita and is possibly best known for her role as Nellie Keene in the BBC drama series Tenko.

== Actress ==
=== Television ===
Crowley has appeared in The Clinic and Proof. Other television credits include: The Onedin Line; Shoestring; Reilly, Ace of Spies; Doctor Who (as Princess Vena in the serial Timelash); and The Racing Game (as Meg Appleby).

=== Film ===
Crowley has appeared in several films, including Educating Rita (1983), alongside Julie Walters and Michael Caine; The Fifth Province (1997); and Dead Bodies (2003).

=== Stage ===
Crowley is a veteran stage actress, having been a member of the Royal National Theatre in London for a period in the 1970s. Beginning in 1972, she appeared in several productions at The Abbey Theatre in Dublin.

In 1975, she played the title role in Katie Roche by playwright Teresa Deevy.

She has also performed at the Gate Theatre in Dublin, most notably in Pygmalion, and as the lead in Tom Stoppard's Arcadia.

== Writer ==
Crowley has written two plays, one of which was performed at the Royal Court Theatre, and has also been a regular contributor to British and Irish national newspapers, including the Sunday Times, The Observer, The Guardian and the Irish Times. In 2002, she was a judge for the Irish Novelist of the Year competition.

== Personal life ==
Crowley was born in 1949 and grew up in Malahide, County Dublin, one of three children of Josephine Glynn and solicitor Eamonn Crowley. She lives in Cleggan, County Galway. When she was a student, her father died while she was onstage playing Ophelia in Hamlet at University College Dublin.

She was an unsuccessful candidate at the 1991 local elections for the Irish Progressive Democrats party. She stood for election to the Pembroke ward of Dublin Corporation.
