= Come Home Charlie and Face Them =

Novel by R. F. Delderfield

- Author: R. F. Delderfield
- Set in: Wales
- Publisher: Hodder & Stoughton
- Publication date: 1969

Come Home Charlie and Face Them (also published as Come Home Charlie) is a 1969 novel by R. F. Delderfield.

== Plot summary ==
Charlie Pritchard arrives in the fictitious North Wales seaside town of Permadoc on 1 April 1929. After seven years working for Cadwallader's Mercantile Bank, the 23-year-old is discontented as he takes up his job in the local branch, especially because he is to lodge with the branch manager, Ewan Rhys-Jones. Ewan and his wife, Gladys, immediately start throwing their daughter, 27-year-old Ida, at Charlie. Charlie and Ida become good friends and begin a sexual relationship, but without any romance involved.

Charlie's serious interest is focused on the woman who works at the Rainbow Café, two doors down from the bank. The beautiful Delphine is the prime attraction of the Café, and Charlie learns that she runs it with her brother, Beppo. Charlie comes to the attention of the two when he stops a factory worker's advances on Delphine, long enough for Beppo to notice what is going on and intervene.

Things deteriorate at Charlie's lodgings when Ida leaves for London. Gladys and Ewan assume it has something to do with Charlie, and the atmosphere at the bank, never too good, becomes even worse. Charlie is therefore all too ready to listen when Delphine makes a proposal to him — she, her brother and Charlie should rob the bank, tunneling from the café into the basement, where the vault is, and obtaining or forging keys to the locks. At first Charlie is dismissive, but then he decides that he has “damn all to lose”.

The planning for the bank break-in continues, with Charlie continuing to hope for a relationship with Delphine. When the Rhys-Joneses decide there may be some chance of salvaging the hoped-for marriage to Ida, and Ewan approaches Charlie, Charlie pretends that he and Ida had considered marriage, but that, given the bank's slow promotion pace, there seemed no point. Ewan reassures Charlie, and tries to get rid of another bank employee in the hopes of getting a better job for Charlie. Charlie writes Ida a letter, and calls the bank heist off, but Beppo blackmails him by threatening to use some preparatory drawings made by Charlie, threatening to send them to the bank's home office. Charlie is shocked when he spies on Delphine and Beppo and learns they are actually lovers, not brother and sister. Angered and disgusted, he decides to go his own way after the heist.

Ida sends a letter saying she is coming home on the very day set for the heist. Charlie replies that he will be away at his father's retirement ceremony, and asks her to come the following week. The day of the heist arrives, a Saturday, and Charlie succeeds in obtaining a final key from the possession of Ewan. He does so by drugging Ewan and his wife with their bedtime cocoa. While waiting for Delphine, he notices a half-burned envelope in the fireplace. It is a passport envelope, addressed to “Mr. and Mrs. Giuseppe Beppolini”. He rifles the couple's travel bags and finds a passport for a married couple and train tickets to a destination different from the port Charlie had been told would be the escape route. Realizing that the couple have deceived him and intend to swindle him out of the money, Charlie slips the passport and tickets into his pocket.

Charlie and Beppo break through the wall, enter the vault, and take about twenty thousand pounds. On their return to the café, they find that Delphine has discovered Charlie's subterfuge, and has turned on the lights and music in the café to cover any altercation. Beppo takes out a gun, but Charlie rushes him, knocking him down a flight of stairs as the gun goes off. Beppo dies of a broken neck, and Charlie finds that the bullet has hit Delphine, killing her.

In a state of shock, Charlie answers a knock on the café door. It is Ida, just returned, having seen through Charlie's lies and somehow sensed his predicament. She assists him in disposing of the bodies, in an area in which fill is being placed to level the ground for a park. They bury the bodies and the money, and return to the Rhys-Jones house. Charlie asks Ida to marry him, and she agrees, though without much enthusiasm, revealing that the reason she ran off to London was because she was pregnant with Charlie's child, which was then given up for adoption. Ironically, it will be the only child they will ever have.

Once Gladys and Ewan awaken from their drugged sleep (the key having been returned), they are delighted. On the following day, the bank manager and his future son-in-law elect arrive on Monday morning at the bank to find that it has been robbed. The investigation drags on for weeks. At the end, Ewan is forced to retire. Ewan defies the bank directors, making it clear that the head office in Cardiff is responsible for the heist, since they gave him inadequate security. He stalks off, gets drunk, catches pneumonia, and dies only days later. After the funeral, one of the police inspectors makes it clear he suspects Charlie, but there is no evidence of involvement, and Charlie and Ida marry as planned.

Charlie rises to become a bank manager himself, and the two live to old age. When Ida dies, Charlie returns to Penmadoc, seeking to rid himself of the ghosts of the past, and rents a room in what had been the Rhys-Jones house. To his shock, he sees that the park where the Beppolinis lie buried is being dug up for a car park. He watches every day, until they and the money are found, but there is no evidence after forty years to connect Charlie with the skeletons and the money, even when the bodies are identified.

Charlie learns that he is dying. He begins to write his story (this book), intending it to be lodged with a solicitor and released after his death.

== Reception ==
The novel received positive reviews in the United Kingdom and Canada.

== Adaptations ==
The novel was adapted for television series of the same title in 1990 on ITV by Alun Owen and directed by Roger Bamford. It starred Tom Radcliffe, Peter Sallis, Sylvia Kay and Mossie Smith.
