= Elizabeth Chambers (actress) =

British television actress (1933–2018)

- Born: 18 August 1933; Easthampstead, Berkshire, England, UK
- Died: 26 May 2018 (aged 84); England
- Occupation: Actress
- Years active: 1957–2004
- Spouse: Ken Riddington (until his death in 2014)

Elizabeth Chambers (18 August 1933 – 26 May 2018) was an English actress best known for her portrayal of Domenica Van Meyer in the 1980s drama series Tenko. She has also appeared in The Bill, The Onedin Line, To Play the King and One Foot in the Grave.

== Filmography ==
Filmography of Elizabeth Chambers
Year	Title	Role	Notes
1981–1984	Tenko	Domenica Van Meyer	BBC drama series – one of the main roles
Unknown	The Bill	Guest character	Appeared in an episode of the police procedural series
1970s	The Onedin Line	Unknown	BBC historical drama series
1993	To Play the King	Politician’s wife	Second part of the House of Cards trilogy
1992	One Foot in the Grave	Mrs. Black	Episode: "The Beast in the Cage"
