= Seven Men of Gascony =

1949 novel

- First edition (UK)
- Author: R.F. Delderfield
- Language: English
- Genre: Adventure
- Publisher: Werner Laurie (UK); Bobbs-Merrill (US)
- Publication date: 1949
- Publication place: United Kingdom
- Media type: Print

Seven Men of Gascony is a 1949 adventure novel by the British writer R.F. Delderfield. It follows the fate of seven characters through the Napoleonic Wars to the climactic Battle of Waterloo.

== Bibliography ==
- Sternlicht, Sanford. R.F. Delderfield. Twayne Publishers, 1988.
