= Angels (TV series) =

British TV drama series (1975–1983)

- Final version of series titles from 1983
- Genre: Medical drama
- Created by: Paula Milne
- Starring: Fiona Fullerton; Lesley Dunlop; Julie Dawn Cole; Angela Bruce; Pauline Quirke; Kathryn Apanowicz; Shirley Cheriton; Judith Jacob; Clare Clifford; Shelley King; Kathryn Apanowicz
- Theme music composer: Alan Parker
- Opening theme: "Motivation"
- Country of origin: United Kingdom
- Original language: English
- No. of series: 9
- No. of episodes: 220

Production
- Producers: Ron Craddock; Morris Barry; Julia Smith; Ben Rea
- Running time: 50 minutes 1975 – 1978; 30 minutes 1979 – 1983
- Production company: BBC

Original release
- Network: BBC1
- Release: 1 September 1975 – 22 December 1983

Angels is a British television seasonal drama series dealing with the subject of student nurses, which was broadcast by the BBC between 1975 and 1983. It was described as the "Z-Cars of nursing".

The show's format switched to a twice-weekly soap opera format (although still seasonal) from 1979 to 1983.

== Background and creators ==
The show's title derived from the name of the hospital where the series was originally set – St. Angela's, Battersea – although in the early 1980s, the scenario changed to Heath Green Hospital, Birmingham. The series was devised by Paula Milne. Early producers included Morris Barry and Ron Craddock. The first episode was directed by Julia Smith, who became the show's producer in 1979. Her script editor on the later series was Tony Holland. Filming took place at the now demolished St James' Hospital, Balham, London. Location filming for the fictional Heath Green Hospital took place at Walsgrave Hospital in Coventry, which has been demolished and replaced on the same site by University Hospital Coventry. The 1960s design of the hospital's original "Nursing Home" – a six-storey block of flats and bedsits – forms the Heath Green Hospital graphic in the Angels opening title card.

Smith enlisted Holland as script editor after the show became a twice-weekly soap; the pair went on to create EastEnders in the 1980s. Writers on its first series included Jill Hyem and Anne Valery, who both later co-wrote Tenko, and Adele Rose.

=== Actors ===
The series provided valuable early television exposure for a variety of young actresses who went on to become better known on British TV, including Fiona Fullerton, Érin Geraghty, Lesley Dunlop, Julie Dawn Cole, Angela Bruce, Clare Clifford and Pauline Quirke. Additionally, Kathryn Apanowicz, Shirley Cheriton and Judith Jacob all later appeared in EastEnders, with Cheriton playing the particularly prominent role of Debbie Wilkins. Mamta Kaash played a key role in the hospital drama Casualty.

=== Theme music ===
The guitar-driven theme tune, reminiscent of American police dramas of the time, was called "Motivation". It was composed and performed by Alan Parker.

== Critical reception ==
Angels, in its 1979 to 1983 weekly soap format, tackled issues such as contraception, alcoholism and promiscuity as part of the nurses' lives. Angels received criticism for its unglamorous depiction of the nursing profession, but Smith defended the programme, arguing the need to address such subjects in the series. Indeed, with its sometimes hard-hitting portrayal of young nurses facing up to the demands of the profession, Angels, particularly in its soap format days of 1979 to 1983, was grittily authentic. To this end, each actor taking a part was required to work on a real hospital ward to gain experience and thus contribute to the realism of the series.

== Cast ==
Actor	Character	Series Duration
Fiona Fullerton	Patricia Rutherford	Series 1–3
Julie Dawn Cole	Jo Longhurst	Series 1–3
Lesley Dunlop	Ruth Fullman	Series 1
Marsha Millar	Jennifer Sorrell	Series 1
Debbie Ash	Sarah Regan	Series 1
Clare Clifford	Shirley Brent	Series 1–4
Karan David	Sita Patel	Series 1–3
Érin Geraghty	Maureen Morahan	Series 1–3
Deborah Makepeace	Lynn Gale	Series 1–3
Angela Bruce	Sandra Ling	Series 1–5
Jean Gilpin	Deborah Harper	Series 3
Joanna Monro	Anna Newcross	Series 4–7
Shirley Cheriton	Katy Betts	Series 4–7
Carol Holmes	Jean MacEwen	Series 4–6, 8–9
Shelley King	Jay Harper	Series 4–5
Kate Saunders	Brenda Cotteral	Series 4
Clare Walker	Sarah Lloyd-Smith #1	Series 4
Kate Lock	Sarah Lloyd-Smith #2	Series 5
Kathryn Apanowicz	Rose Butchins	Series 5–7
Sharon Rosita	Fleur Barrett	Series 5–7
Judith Jacob	Beverley Slater	Series 5–7
Susan Gilmore	Elizabeth Fitt	Series 6–7
Fay Howard	Adrienne O'Shea	Series 6
Julia Williams	Tracey Willoughby	Series 7–9
Sarah Lam	Linda Mo	Series 7–8
Pauline Quirke	Vicky Smith	Series 8–9
Mamta Kaash	Nargis Khan	Series 8
Al Ashton	Mike Hathaway	Series 8
Michelle Martin	Janet Dickens	Series 8–9
Juliet Waley	Alison Streeter	Series 8–9
Joy Lemoine	Ayo Lapido	Series 9

== Episodes ==
Series	Episodes	Originally released	
Series	Episodes	First released	Last released
1	15	1 September 1975	8 December 1975
2	13	6 April 1976	29 June 1976
3	16	6 September 1976	20 December 1976
4	13	3 April 1978	3 July 1978
5	32	3 September 1979	19 December 1979
6	34	1 September 1980	23 December 1980
7	33	7 September 1981	30 December 1981
8	32	6 September 1982	21 December 1982
9	32	6 September 1983	22 December 1983

== Novels ==
Some TV tie-in novels were published to coincide with the series:

- Angels by Paula Milne & Leslie Duxbury, Pan Books/BBC Books, 1975.
- Flights of Angels by Paula Milne, Pan Books/BBC Books, 1976. Includes novelisations of the Season 2 episodes "Vocation" and "Walkabout".
- New Angels by Paula Milne, BBC Books, 1978.
- Angel Katy by Leah Harrow, Dragon Books, 1979.

== Home media ==
Title	Episodes	No. of discs	Release date (Region 2)	BBFC rating	Distributor
Angels: The Complete First Series	15	5	18 March 2013	12	Simply Media
Angels: The Complete Second Series	13	4	15 September 2014	12	Simply Media
Angels: Complete Series 1 & 2	28	9	3 November 2014	12	Simply Media
