= To Serve Them All My Days (TV series) =

British drama television series (1980–81)

- DVD cover
- Genre: Drama
- Based on: To Serve Them All My Days by R. F. Delderfield
- Written by: Andrew Davies
- Directed by: Ronald Wilson; Peter Jefferies; Terence Dudley
- Starring: John Duttine; Frank Middlemass; Alan MacNaughtan; Patricia Lawrence
- Country of origin: United Kingdom
- Original language: English
- No. of series: 1
- No. of episodes: 13

Production
- Producer: Ken Riddington
- Running time: 50 minutes
- Production companies: BBC; ABC

Original release
- Network: BBC1
- Release: 17 October 1980 – 16 January 1981

To Serve Them All My Days is a British television drama series, adapted by Andrew Davies from R. F. Delderfield's 1972 novel of the same name. It was first broadcast by the BBC over thirteen episodes between 17 October 1980 and 16 January 1981. It was broadcast in Australia in 1981 by the Australian Broadcasting Commission, and in 1982 by PBS in the United States as part of their Masterpiece Theatre anthology series.

== Plot ==
David Powlett-Jones, a coal miner's son from South Wales, has risen from the ranks and been commissioned as a Second Lieutenant in the First World War. In 1918, after being injured and shell-shocked, he is hired to teach modern history at Bamfylde School, a fictional public school in North Devon, in the southwest of England, where he wins the respect and acclaim of colleagues and pupils. He serves under headmaster Algy Herries, forms a friendship with Ian Howarth and marries Beth. He engages in a long bitter rivalry with the jingoistic science master Carter but the two of them later become friends. Powlett-Jones is eventually appointed headmaster.

== Production ==
The series was filmed over 11 months in 1980, with Devon and Dorset locations including Milton Abbey School in Dorset.

== Cast ==
- John Duttine as David Powlett-Jones
- Frank Middlemass as Algy Herries
- Alan MacNaughtan as Howarth
- Patricia Lawrence as Ellie Herries
- Neil Stacy as Carter
- Susan Jameson as Christine Forster
- Charles Kay as Alcock
- Kim Braden as Julia
- John Welsh as Cordwainer
- Cyril Luckham as Sir Rufus Creighton
- Simon Gipps-Kent as Chad Boyer
- Belinda Lang as Beth
- Nicholas Lyndhurst as Dobson
- David King as Barnaby
- Phillip Joseph as Emrys Powlett-Jones
- Michael Turner as Brigadier Cooper
- Norman Bird as Alderman Blunt

== Reception ==
Writing for The New York Times, critic John J. O'Connor described the production as "a richly textured tapestry crammed with the social details that were the speciality of Mr. Delderfield", with "a steady flow of insightful and touching moments". He praised the performances of the cast and that of Duttine in particular. People magazine called the series a "colorful chronicle of post-World War I England that never crosses over to the gooey side of sentiment."

The adaptation was nominated in the Best Drama Series category at the 1981 British Academy Television Awards and in the Outstanding Limited Series category at the 1983 Primetime Emmy Awards.

== DVD release ==
All episodes of To Serve Them All My Days have been made available on DVD in the UK, Australia and the US.
