= Stop at a Winner =

1961 novel

- First edition (UK)
- Author: R.F. Delderfield
- Language: English
- Genre: Comedy
- Publisher: Hodder & Stoughton (UK); Simon & Schuster (US)
- Publication date: 1961
- Publication place: United Kingdom
- Media type: Print

Stop at a Winner is a 1961 comedy novel by the British writer R.F. Delderfield. It follows the misadventures of two RAF men during the Second World War, the gentle giant Pedlar Pascoe and the conniving Horace Pope, a Londoner who has attempted to avoid conscription.

== Adaptation ==
It was adapted into the British film On the Fiddle directed by Cyril Frankel, with the lead roles played by Sean Connery and Alfred Lynch.

== Bibliography ==
- Sternlicht, Sanford. R.F. Delderfield. Twayne Publishers, 1988.
