= Too Few For Drums =

1964 novel

- First edition
- Author: R.F. Delderfield
- Language: English
- Genre: Adventure
- Publisher: Hodder & Stoughton
- Publication date: 1964
- Publication place: United Kingdom
- Media type: Print

Too Few For Drums is a 1964 war adventure novel by the British writer R.F. Delderfield. A small unit of British soldiers get cut off from the rest of their army by French forces during the Peninsular War.

== Bibliography ==
- Sternlicht, Sanford. R.F. Delderfield. Twayne Publishers, 1988.
