= Greville Poke =

Greville John Poke (19 August 1912 – 4 March 2000) was an arts administrator and a founding member of the English Stage Company. He served as the Honorary Secretary of the English Stage Company from 1954 to 1973 and chairman from 1973 to 1978.

== Early life ==
Greville Poke's parents were Frederick Robert Poke and Ethel Esther Mulcaster. He was born on 19 August 1912 in Chelsea, and his father was a Fleet Street magazine owner. Poke was educated at Harrow School. He studied History, Archaeology and Anthropology at Jesus College, University of Cambridge (1931–1934), where he took a third-class degree. As a young man he was keen on acting in, and directing, amateur productions and going to the theatre.

== Personal life and early career ==
Poke married Patricia Lawrence (1925–1993) in the City of Westminster in 1947. His wife was an actress and the couple had two sons, Christopher Frederick Lawrence Poke and the musician James John Lawrence Poke.

The family operated a newspaper distribution business. Poke joined the business before becoming the editor of Everybody's, a weekly publication. His father had launched the magazine in 1913 as Competitor's Journal. Amalgamated Press took over the magazine in 1950, but Greville Poke stayed on as editor. In 1953 he resigned and went on to sell advertising space for the Taw and Torridge Festival of the Arts in Devon that year. This was managed by Ronald Duncan with Lord Harewood and Edward Blacksell. Duncan and Poke had met at Cambridge. In 1954 Duncan invited Poke to become a member of a group known as the 'English Stage Society'. The society's aims were to sponsor lectures and play-readings and particularly to support the founding of a permanent repertory company.

Duncan wanted to establish a theatre company devoted to the staging of non-commercial plays. This led to the foundation of the English Stage Company (ESC) with assistance from the organisers of the festival, Oscar Lewenstein and later George Devine. The ESC became a registered corporate body on 16 October 1954. It altered its name from 'Society' to 'Company' to differentiate itself from existing organisations.

== Career at the English Stage Company ==
=== Establishing the Company ===
Poke was among the founding members of the ESC and took the role of Honorary Secretary from 1954 to 1973. One of Poke's first actions was to assist in gaining the support of Neville Blond. Blond was an influential industrialist and a skilled financial advisor. In 1954 Poke and Duncan outlined the ESC's vision to Blond, who agreed that he would support them when the company had acquired a theatre. Poke carried out negotiations to purchase Alfred Esdaile's rundown Kingsway Theatre. This needed extensive refurbishment, so the company decided to lease the Royal Court Theatre (RCT) from Esdaile. Nevertheless Blond joined the group and was its first ESC chairman from 1954 to 1970.

Poke was on the finance subcommittee and helped managed the company's accounts. He also contributed his opinions about the theatre's artistic direction. The ESC’s Artistic Director from 1956–65, was Devine. Poke disagreed with him several times over the artistic control of the theatre and the choice of production. Poke's taste was, on the whole, for traditional English drama. Hence he voiced his concerns about the left-wing politics evident in many plays staged by the ESC and what he thought was their pessimistic tone.

=== Censorship ===
In early 1966 the ESC was prosecuted for their production of Edward Bond's Saved staged in December 1965. The company had claimed that it was being run as a private club, and was therefore exempt from the Theatres Act 1843. Poke, the secretary, William Gaskill, the director and Esdaile, the licensee, were summoned to a hearing at Marlborough Magistrates Court to represent the ESC. The Lord Chamberlain had denied Saved a licence unless two scenes were cut, including one in which a baby is stoned to death on stage. The Director of Public Prosecutions made eighteen summonses against the ESC prompted by the Chamberlain.

In March 1966 when the hearing resumed Poke, Gaskill and Esdaile pleaded not guilty. The court ruled that the performance violated the Theatres Act 1843 as the RCT was open several nights a week as a public theatre and was not just a private club. The ESC was fined £50 which was a token amount for a technical offence. The case of Saved contributed to the repeal of the Theatres Act 1843 in 1968. This liberated theatres from censorship.

In 1967 Lord Chamberlain banned the ESC's performance of Bond's play Early Morning. To avoid prosecution, Poke proposed that the company stage the play as a dress rehearsal without a ticket charge. This idea was successful. Soon the Theatres Act 1968 followed, which abolished the censorship of plays by the Lord Chamberlain.

=== Press controversy ===
In 1969 the ESC became involved in a controversy involving critics in the press, and Poke advised the Company on how to handle the situation. The directors regarded Hilary Spurling, a drama critic working for The Spectator, as disruptive so refused to give her tickets to their production of The Contractor. As an ex-journalist, he was reluctant to curtail the freedom of the press and was the only person within the ESC to oppose the decision to exclude Spurling. He warned the ESC that the Arts Council would protest against the action and might threaten to stop funding the company. Poke was correct: the Arts Council stated its objections and newspaper drama critics boycotted Royal Court performances. Backtracking, the directors admitted that they should have taken Poke’s advice and reinstated the company’s policy of inviting the press to productions.

=== Chairman ===
In 1970 Poke refused the offer of the Chairmanship of the ESC, but accepted when offered the position in 1973. He served as the chairman until 1978. Remaining on the council until the 1990s, Poke was president until his death in 2000.

== Other interests ==
As well as the ESC, Poke was involved with several other theatrical organisations. He was chairman of the London Academy of Music and Dramatic Art and Thorndike Theatre, Leatherhead. Financially he supported new stage productions including the musical 'Evita'. Poke was heavily involved in charitable work. This included supporting the Actors Centre, the Royal Theatrical Support Fund and the Richard Haines Charitable Trust.
