= On the Fiddle =

1961 British film by Cyril Frankel

- Original UK quad size poster
- Directed by: Cyril Frankel
- Screenplay by: Harold Buchman
- Based on: Stop at a Winner by R. F. Delderfield
- Produced by: Benjamin Fisz
- Starring: Sean Connery; Alfred Lynch; Cecil Parker; Wilfrid Hyde-White; Stanley Holloway; Kathleen Harrison; Eleanor Summerfield; Eric Barker; Terence Longdon; Alan King
- Cinematography: Edward Scaife
- Edited by: Peter Hunt
- Music by: Malcolm Arnold
- Production company: Coronado Productions
- Distributed by: Anglo-Amalgamated Film Distributors
- Release date: 10 October 1961 (UK)
- Running time: 86 minutes
- Country: United Kingdom
- Language: English

On the Fiddle (U.S. titles Operation Snafu and Operation War Head) is a 1961 British comedy film directed by Cyril Frankel and starring Sean Connery, Alfred Lynch, Cecil Parker, Stanley Holloway, Eric Barker, Michael Sarne, Wilfrid Hyde-White, Kathleen Harrison, Victor Maddern and John Le Mesurier. The screenplay was by Harold Buchman, based on the 1961 novel Stop at a Winner by R. F. Delderfield who served in the RAF in World War II.

It was Sean Connery's tenth film and his first lead role, released the year before his big breakthrough as James Bond in the 1962 film Dr No.

== Plot ==
During the Second World War, spiv Horace Pope is taken to court for street peddling. In mitigation, he tells the magistrate he is working in the black market only while waiting to enlist in the war effort. On hearing this plea, the magistrate calls his bluff and forces him to sign up.

Pope joins the RAF. Very quickly, he makes friends with the easy going, but loyal, Pedlar Pascoe who happily goes along with all of his scams, which mainly involve taking money for leave passes and for organising postings close to home. The pair do their utmost to make a bit on the side and avoid being sent into action.

Their record eventually catches up with them, but by that time they have been sent on a mission to occupied France, where they continue their scams, selling food and supplies to the grateful newly-liberated French.

They unexpectedly become heroes during the Ardennes Offensive after killing a group of German soldiers who had them pinned down in a forest. They are decorated by the American forces to whom they have been attached, and their commanding officer, who has a sneaking admiration for their schemes, tears up their record of crimes.

== Cast ==
- Alfred Lynch as Horace Pope
- Sean Connery as Pedlar Pascoe
- Cecil Parker as Group Captain Bascombe
- Stanley Holloway as Cooksley
- Alan King as Technical Sergeant Buzzer
- Eric Barker as Doctor
- Wilfrid Hyde-White as Trowbridge
- Kathleen Harrison as Mrs Cooksley
- Beatrix Lehmann as Lady Edith
- Eleanor Summerfield as Flora McNaughton
- Miriam Karlin as WAAF sergeant
- Terence Longdon as air gunner
- Victor Maddern as first airman
- Harry Locke as Huxtable
- John Le Mesurier as Hixon
- Viola Keats as Sister
- Peter Sinclair as Mr Pope
- Edna Morris as Lil
- Thomas Heathcote as sergeant
- Brian Weske as corporal
- Jack Lambert as police constable
- Cyril Smith as ticket collector
- Simon Lack as Flight Lieutenant Baldwin
- Graham Stark as Sergeant Ellis
- Jean Aubrey as WAAF corporal
- Jack Smethurst as Dai Tovey
- Priscilla Morgan as Gwynneth Tovey
- Richard Hart as P.O. Trumper
- Ian Whittaker as Lancing
- Stuart Saunders as Sarge
- Monty Landis as conductor
- Kenneth J. Warren as Dusty
- Neil Hallett as 1st Australian
- Patsy Rowlands as Evie
- Bill Owen as Corporal Gittens
- Harold Goodwin as Corporal Reeves
- Barbara Windsor as Mavis
- Toni Palmer as Ivy
- Ann Beach as Iris
- Gary Cockrell as U.S. Snowdrop
- Michael Sarne as German officer

== Production ==
Connery had previously made The Frightened City for Anglo Amalgamated. The fighting scenes in the woods were shot in and around "The Sandpit" on Horsell Common near Woking, Surrey. Interiors were completed at Shepperton Studios, Surrey.

== Releases ==
US poster, emphasising Sean Connery and unknown woman, who does not feature in film

The film was not released in the United States until 21 May 1965, retitled Operation Snafu and later Operation War Head by distributor American International Pictures. The titles, as well as the advertising campaign, downplayed the comedic aspects of the film as well as Connery's original second-billing. During a 1961 trip to England Alan King made a brief appearance in the film and forgot about it until the American release gave him second billing. He and Connery would work together again on The Anderson Tapes (1971).

== Reception ==
The Monthly Film Bulletin wrote: "Basically, there's little to choose between this and any other briskly made British service farce. But the differences that distinguish it are important – namely, Alfred Lynch and, to a lesser degree, Sean Connery. As the cockney spiv, Pope, Lynch takes the trouble to create a real character not just a caricature. Thus the string of comic incidents take on a whacky credibility that springs directly from the shrewdly observed manipulator in charge of them. Connery is almost equally believable. His slow, conscience-ridden and rather gormless Pascoe is the ideal foil for Pope's quick-wittedness. Only at the end does the film lose contact with his essential character when he miraculously demonstrates a wily bravery in besting the enemy. For the rest, director Cyril Frankel handles the barrack-room humour with a firmness that, in the main, doesn't let its exhibitionist supporting cast ... over-dominate or its jokes overrun their limits."

Reviewing the film in The New York Times, following its 1965 US release, Howard Thompson noted that the release was "an obvious cash-in" on Connery's popularity as James Bond, but found it, "a friendly little wartime comedy from England." He wrote that, "The wonder is that a picture with a story already done, gag by gag, a hundred times is so easy to take. It is, though — flip, friendly, brisk and a wee bit cynical in its take-it-or-leave-it jauntiness", and concluded that, "The film is familiar and trifling, but it's perky."

The Radio Times Guide to Films gave the film 2/5 stars, writing: "Sean Connery was only a year away from becoming an international superstar in Dr No when he took the role of a dim witted gypsy in this hit-and-miss comedy. He plays second fiddle to Alfred Lynch, who stars as a conman inducted into the army. Known in the States as Operation Snafu, this was presumably meant to be a minor variation on the Bilko theme. Sadly, it feels more like one of those wartime morale boosters featuring a couple of fading music-hall comics."

Leslie Halliwell said: "Curious mixture of farce and action, more on American lines than British, but quite entertainingly presented."
