= A Local Boy =

Australian TV play

- Written by: Alun Owen
- Directed by: Henri Safran
- Starring: John Meillon
- Country of origin: Australia
- Original language: English

Production
- Running time: 60 mins

Original release
- Network: ABC
- Release: 21 October 1964 (Sydney)
- Release: 4 November 1964
- Release: 10 November 1965 (Brisbane)

A Local Boy is a 1964 Australian TV play produced in ABC's Gore Hill Studios in Sydney. Australian TV drama was relatively rare at the time.

The play featured, reportedly, the first near-nude scene on Australian television.

== Plot ==
In Wales, a barrister, David Owen, attempts to become a member of Parliament. He comes up against the older member, Evan Lloyd.

== Cast ==
- John Meillon as David Owen
- June Thody as Prue Owen
- John Grey as Albert, the barman
- John Huson as Gerran Jones, a political agent
- Tom Farley as Evan Lloyd
- Ethel Lang as Mrs. Williams.

== Production ==
It was Meillon's first television play since he returned from England after five years to appear in Rattle of a Simple Man. He went on to appear in The Recruiting Officer for the ABC soon afterwards. Thoday was an Adelaide actor who had returned to Australia after five years in England.

The near-nude scene came when the character of Prue Owen tried to entice her husband back into bed. The camera focused on her bare back for a few seconds. "The scene is not designed for sensationalism," said director Henri Safran. "It wasn't put in there to shock the public. It is a very delicate scene and was handled tastefully. The play called for the scene and it was handled tastefully."

"The scene was very well handled," said Thody. "There was nothing unpleasant about it."

== Reception ==
The Australian Woman's Weekly said they were "pleasantly surprised" by the quality.

The Canberra Times said, "It was such a surprise this week to see a locally produced play that was worthy of the talents of the cast that I cannot remember when it last happened."

The Sydney Morning Herald said it was made with "outstandingly high polish."

== See also ==
- List of television plays broadcast on Australian Broadcasting Corporation (1960s)
