= The Orchard Walls =

The Orchard Walls is a play by the British writer R.F. Delderfield. A drama, it examines the relationship between the daughter of wealthy parents and the car mechanic with whom she falls in love and attempts to elope with. It was first staged at Aldershot in October 1953 and later moved to the St Martin's Theatre in London.

== Original cast ==
- Philip O'Hea - Cyril Raymond
- Michael Pritchard - John Charlesworth
- Nicholas Stubbs - Colin Douglas
- Geoffrey Pritchard - Edward Evans
- Rachel Ames - Maureen O'Reilly
- Beatrice Maynard - Gillian Lind
- Christine Muir - Valerie White
- Mrs. Grant - Helen Horsey
- Shirley Grant - Dorothy Gordon

== Adaptations ==
In 1955, the play was adapted for radio and broadcast on the BBC Home Service, with Dorothy Gordon and John Charlesworth repeating their stage roles.

In 1956, the play was adapted into a film Now and Forever directed by Mario Zampi, and starring Janette Scott and Vernon Gray.

== Bibliography ==
- Harper, Sue & Porter, Vincent. British Cinema of the 1950s: The Decline of Deference. Oxford University Press, 2007.
- Watson, George. The New Cambridge bibliography of English literature, Volume 5. Cambridge University Press, 1972.
