= What the Butler Saw (1950 film) =

- Directed by: Godfrey Grayson
- Screenplay by: A.R. Rawlinson; E.J. Mason
- Based on: An original story by Roger and Donald Good
- Produced by: Anthony Hinds
- Starring: Edward Rigby; Henry Mollison; Mercy Haystead; Michael Ward
- Cinematography: Walter J. Harvey (as Walter Harvey)
- Edited by: James Needs
- Production company: Hammer Films
- Distributed by: Exclusive Films
- Release date: September 1950
- Running time: 61 mins
- Country: United Kingdom
- Language: English

What the Butler Saw is a 1950 British second feature ('B') comedy film directed by Godfrey Grayson and starring Edward Rigby, Henry Mollison and Mercy Haystead. The screenplay was by A.R. Rawlinson and E.J. Mason, from an original story by Roger and Donald Good. It was made by Hammer Films. Production began on 9 Jan. 1950. It was trade shown on 22 June 1950 at the Rialto, and was released in September 1950. The film did not do well at the box office, and, although once considered a lost film, it is now freely available on the internet and has been shown in the UK by Talking Pictures TV.

== Plot ==
The Earl, having retired as the Governor of a British-owned tropical island, returns home to England to find that Lapis, the attractive daughter of the island's native king, has stowed away in his baggage. She has fallen in love with his butler, Bembridge. Fearing a scandal, the Earl and Bembridge and family try to keep her hidden, but she roams the house and becomes known to the staff who leak her presence to a newspaper. A reporter arrives to investigate, but winds up falling in love with the Earl's daughter, and agrees to hold off on filing his story about Lapis. Through his contacts in the government, the Earl arranges for Bembridge to be appointed as the Governor of the island kingdom, and both of them together with Lapis set off to return there, where the Earl will serve as their butler.

== Cast ==
- Edward Rigby as the Earl
- Henry Mollison as Bembridge the butler
- Mercy Haystead as Lapis
- Anne Valery as the Earl's daughter, Elaine
- Peter Burton as Bill Fenton, the reporter
- Michael Ward as Gerald
- Eleanor Hallam as Lady Mary
- Howard Charlton as Perks
- Alfred Harris as Bishop
- George Bishop as the General
- Norman Pitt as policeman

== Reception ==
Picturegoer wrote: "Edward Rigby's picture. Without him this latest effort by Exclusive Films would creak badly. But even his wonderful wit cannot prevent it from being dull and slow in parts. Few of the situations are original. ... Henry Mollison does not always show the poise associated with a good butler."

Picture Show wrote: "Farcical comedy, directed without subtlety, acted with liveliness."

In British Sound Films: The Studio Years 1928–1959 David Quinlan rated the film as "average", writing: "Rigby's valiant efforts keep farce going."
