= Moonbase 3 =

1973 British science fiction TV series

- Created by: Barry Letts; Terrance Dicks
- Starring: Donald Houston; Ralph Bates; Barry Lowe; Fiona Gaunt
- Theme music composer: Dudley Simpson
- Country of origin: United Kingdom
- Original language: English
- No. of series: 1
- No. of episodes: 6

Production
- Producer: Barry Letts
- Camera setup: Multi-camera (studio)
- Running time: c. 50 minute episodes
- Production companies: 20th Century Fox Television; BBC

Original release
- Network: BBC One (United Kingdom); ABC (United States)
- Release: 9 September – 14 October 1973

Moonbase 3 is a British science fiction television series that ran for six episodes in 1973. It was a co-production between the BBC, 20th Century Fox and the American ABC network. Created by Doctor Who producer Barry Letts and script editor Terrance Dicks as a realistic alternative strand of TV science-fiction, it was not a commercial or critical success (Dicks himself has stated in a foreword to a collection of Tom Baker-era Doctor Who scripts that they "overdid the grimness and forgot about the sense of wonder that science fiction is all about").

It starred Donald Houston as Director David Caulder, who is appointed to the position after the previous director was killed while returning to Earth. Ralph Bates was Michel Lebrun, the deputy director, who was concerned about keeping to the rules. Fiona Gaunt played Doctor Helen Smith, the base's psychiatrist, and Barry Lowe played Tom Hill, the head of the base technical section.

The programme was notable for its combination of realistic spaceflight procedures, ensured by hiring BBC technical adviser James Burke, and its strong character-based writing.

== Concept and setting ==
Moonbase 3 was set in the year 2003 – some 30 years into the future at time of broadcast – and dramatised life in the enclosed environment of the titular moonbase. Five world powers have colonised the Moon: America (Moonbase 1, commanded by Bill Jackson), Russia (Moonbase 2), Europe (Moonbase 3), China (Moonbase 4, commanded by General Cheng) and Brazil (Moonbase 5). The European Moonbase 3 has been in existence for 8 years at the time the series starts. With oversight provided by the European Space Assembly and the European Aeronautics and Space Administration, Moonbase 3 is a shoestring operation when compared with the Russian and American efforts and much of base director David Caulder's job is to stave off budget cuts or a complete shutdown in the face of sceptical bureaucrats.

Alongside technical problems such as stranded astronauts, explosive decompressions and failed experiments, the inhabitants of the moonbase must also deal with psychological problems arising from the cramped, dangerous environment they live in. In "Departure and Arrival", a mental breakdown suffered by a shuttle pilot has tragic consequences. "Achilles Heel" and "Outsiders" deal with the fallout from crew members' difficulty with living up to the standards they have set for themselves. "Behemoth" and "View of a Dead Planet" deal with forms of mass hysteria.

== Principal characters ==
The Cast of Moonbase 3: Barry Lowe, Donald Houston, Ralph Bates and Fiona Gaunt

Dr David Caulder (Donald Houston)
Appointed Director of Moonbase 3 following the death of his predecessor, David Caulder is a scientist, academic and administrator.

Dr Michel Lebrun (Ralph Bates)
Deputy Director of Moonbase 3.

Dr Helen Smith (Fiona Gaunt)
The base psychologist responsible for preparing regular psychological record reports (or PSIs), assessing the mental state of all personnel.

Tom Hill (Barry Lowe)
Director of operations on the moonbase responsible for flight control and base maintenance. An experienced astronaut, down-to-earth no-nonsense type, who dislikes having his work interfered with by management.

== Production ==
=== Origins ===
Terrance Dicks and Barry Letts had been working together, as script editor and producer respectively, on Doctor Who since 1970. Dicks had begun his television writing career on The Avengers and Crossroads before joining Doctor Who as its script editor in 1968. Former actor Barry Letts had changed career into television direction in 1967 and had worked on series such as Z-Cars and The Newcomers before being asked to take over as producer of Doctor Who in 1970, where he first met Dicks. In 1972, looking to move on from Doctor Who, the pair started considering a number of ideas for other shows they could collaborate on. Their first idea arose from the successful collaboration they had with the Royal Navy on the Doctor Who serial The Sea Devils which led to them considering pitching a serial set on a frigate only to find they were too late – the BBC had just commissioned a series, Warship, with that very premise. In late 1972, they developed the concept of Moonbase 3, as an anthology series set on a lunar colony that would "provide intelligent, realistic drama rather than Science Fantasy", and submitted a pilot script, titled "Departure and Arrival", to Shaun Sutton, the Head of Drama at the BBC. The series was formally commissioned in December 1972 and would be made, as a co-production between the BBC and 20th Century Fox and the ABC network in America, during the break in production between Seasons 10 and 11 of Doctor Who.

=== Production ===
The first Moonbase 3 script to be formally commissioned was "View of a Dead Planet" on 15 December 1972. This was written by Arden Winch, a respected writer who had written for The Wednesday Play. Two scripts, "Behemoth" and "Outsiders", were commissioned from John Brason, who had written for Colditz and Special Branch. The final two scripts, "The Dark Side of the Moon" and "The Gentle Rain" (later renamed "Castor and Pollux" and "Achilles Heel" respectively), were commissioned from John Lucarotti, a prolific writer whose credits included The Avengers, Doctor Who and The Troubleshooters. Lastly, Letts and Dicks retrospectively commissioned themselves in late May 1973 for their pilot script "Departure and Arrival".

In order to achieve a high level of realism, Letts and Dicks hired a technical advisor, James Burke, a science correspondent who was well known to television viewers thanks to his work as anchorman on the television coverage of the Apollo Moon landings and for presenting science series such as Tomorrow's World and The Burke Special. Burke decided that 2003 would be a realistic date for bases to have been established on the Moon, telling the Radio Times that "Men won't go back to the Moon until the 1990s. Neither the Russians nor the Americans have any plans at present and no-one else can afford it. [...] As for the base itself – it should look exactly as it would if they built one tomorrow. [...] They'd be small, supporting 30 or 40 men and running on a shoestring. [...] It'll be like life on a nuclear submarine".

Cast as David Caulder was Donald Houston, an experienced character actor, who had appeared in 633 Squadron and The Longest Day, and was known for playing authority figures. Ralph Bates, who was cast as Michel Lebrun, had first made a name for himself playing the Emperor Caligula in the Granada Television series The Caesars but was best known as a regular actor in the Hammer horror stable. Fiona Gaunt, playing Helen Smith, had been in a television adaptation of War and Peace while Barry Lowe, playing Tom Hill, had been a regular on the police drama Z-Cars.

Two directors were assigned to the series – Ken Hannam and Christopher Barry. Hannam had previously directed such series as Colditz and Paul Temple while Barry had worked extensively on Doctor Who, having directed some 31 episodes at the time, including the stories The Dæmons and The Mutants for Letts and Dicks, as well as episodes of Out of the Unknown, Paul Temple and The Onedin Line. Hannam and Barry alternated directing the episodes between them with filming on Moonbase 3 beginning on 24 April 1973 at the BBC film studios in Ealing. The Ealing filming mainly centred around the scenes set on the lunar surface which proved a difficult experience for the actors. Star Donald Houston told the Radio Times that the spacesuits got "hot and claustrophobic. In the end they had to have oxygen standing by. [...] the dust rose in clouds and the cameramen all wore surgical masks. The actors just choked". Recalling his guest appearance on Moonbase 3, in the episode "Behemoth", Peter Miles told TV Zone in 1991 that he was "asked to be like a gazelle and leap as I came down the hillock in full astronaut gear. [...] The tech crew wondered why I was steaming up furiously in my astronaut's head. They'd forgotten to put air holes into the helmet. [...] I said, 'Help help! Help help! I'm not breathing folks!' They took the helmet off before drilling the holes or I wouldn't be here now". Filming continued at Ealing until 30 May 1973 before production moved to BBC Television Centre for the remaining scenes, mostly those set inside the moonbase, which would be recorded on videotape beginning on 18 June 1973. The episodes were recorded in a different order than that in which they were broadcast with "Departure and Arrival" recorded first followed by "Castor and Pollux", "Behemoth", "View of a Dead Planet", "Outsiders" and, lastly, "Achilles Heel" with recording wrapping on 15 August 1973. Music was provided by Dudley Simpson who, at this time, was the regular composer on Doctor Who. Simpson composed the main title theme that accompanied the opening and closing credits as well as approximately 60 minutes of incidental music.

=== Transmission and audience reaction ===
Moonbase 3 was promoted by the Radio Times on the week of broadcast with a two-page article by Mike Bygrave, titled "The Facts of Life on the Moon", that interviewed James Burke about his ideas of life on the Moon and also spoke to star Donald Houston, dresser Leslie Hallam and costume designer Dee Kelly about their experiences making the show. Broadcast on Sunday nights at 7:25pm on BBC One, audience reaction to the series was disappointing with the debut episode garnering under 6 million viewers and ratings slipping as low as 2 million in subsequent weeks before stabilising at 4 million. A BBC Audience Research report slated the series as "banal, predictable and slow". Reviewing "Departure and Arrival" in The Observer, Clive James described the plot as "the Yangtze Incident plus liquid oxygen".

=== Archive status ===
As was normal procedure at the BBC at the time, the original PAL master tapes of the series were wiped some time after broadcast and, for many years, Moonbase 3 was believed to be lost forever. In 1993, NTSC copies of all six episodes were found in co-producer Fox's archives and returned to the BBC. The series was subsequently released on VHS videotape over three volumes in 1994 by BBC Video and on DVD in 2002 by Second Sight.

== Legacy ==
Terrance Dicks has felt that Moonbase 3 was ultimately a failure: "The trouble was we built a too restrictive format for ourselves" and that the series "lacked a sense of wonder and outrageousness". Academic Peter Wright has said about Moonbase 3 that its "appeal to realism resulted in a disquieting sense of claustrophobia and isolation that undermined the optimism of its premise and captured the general mood of insularity felt (and often desired) in Britain in the early 1970s". Moonbase 3, although not directly influential, can be seen as an antecedent of similar realistic, near-future, British space series such as Space: 1999, Star Cops and Space Island One.

== Episodes ==
Six episodes of Moonbase 3 were made and broadcast on BBC One on Sunday nights at 7:25pm beginning on 9 September 1973.

No.	Title	Directed by	Written by	Original release date	Airtime	Duration
1	"Departure and Arrival"	Ken Hannam	Barry Letts and Terrance Dicks	9 September 1973	7:25pm	51’42'’
Astronaut Harry Sanders (Michael Wisher) suffers a mental breakdown while piloting a shuttle from the Moon back to Earth, causing an accident that kills him and his passenger, Moonbase 3 director Tony Ransome (Michael Lees). Under political pressure to close the Moonbase following the deaths, the Director-General of the European space programme appoints David Caulder to take over as Director of Moonbase 3 and investigate the accident.
2	"Behemoth"	Ken Hannam	John Brason	16 September 1973	7:26pm	51’09'’
When two seismologists mysteriously vanish in the Mare Frigoris region, Caulder bans all travel into the area, a decision that upsets Dr Heinz Laubenthal (Peter Miles) who is conducting research in the area but won't reveal what he is working on. Some time later, Laubenthal is killed in an explosion in his laboratory. Investigations reveal that the lab walls were breached from the outside and strange tracks are found leading from the lab in the direction of the Mare Frigoris. As rumours of space monsters begin to disrupt life on the moonbases, Caulder leads a team into Mare Frigoris in search of the truth.
3	"Achilles Heel"	Christopher Barry	John Lucarotti	23 September 1973	7:25pm	51’45'’
While Caulder is pressured to deliver results from Moonbase 3's research programme under threat of budget cuts, the CORA radio astronomy project is thrown into disarray by a series of accidents. As the situation develops it becomes apparent that one of the three CORA scientists – Adam Blaney (Edward Brayshaw), Bill Knight (Malcolm Reynolds) and Kate Weyman (Anne Ridler) – is suffering from a mental breakdown and is sabotaging the project.
4	"Outsiders"	Ken Hannam	John Brason	30 September 1973	7:24pm	52’02'’
Faced with an inspection ahead of potential budget cuts, Caulder's hopes of demonstrating that the Moonbase 3 research programme is worthwhile lie with two brilliant, but erratic, researchers, Stephen Partness (Tom Kempinkski) and Peter Conway (John Hallam), both of whom are showing evidence of cracking under the strain.
5	"Castor and Pollux"	Christopher Barry	John Lucarotti	7 October 1973	7:24pm	51’33'’
While Caulder explores the possibility of participating in a joint expedition to Jupiter with the Russians, an accident during a routine docking manoeuvre with a satellite leaves a shuttle with Tom Hill on board tumbling out into deep space. Caulder mounts a rescue mission but must convince the Russians to help him.
6	"View of a Dead Planet"	Christopher Barry	Arden Winch	14 October 1973	7:24pm	51’44'’
Controversy surrounds the Arctic Sun Project, a plan to detonate a hydrogen bomb above the Arctic Circle to melt the icecaps and open up new land for development. When the project is initiated, all contact with Earth is lost as it becomes enveloped in a strange mist. The inhabitants of the Moon colonies struggle to come to terms with the possibility that Earth has been destroyed and they are all that's left of humanity.
