= To Serve Them All My Days =

Novel by R. F. Delderfield

- First edition
- Author: R. F. Delderfield
- Language: English
- Genre: Historical novel
- Publisher: Hodder & Stoughton
- Publication date: 1972
- Publication place: England
- Media type: Print (Hardcover)
- Pages: 638 pp
- ISBN: 0-340-14996-5
- OCLC: 1511050
- Dewey Decimal: 823/.9/12
- LC Class: PZ3.D37618 Tn PR6007.E36

For the 1980 television adaptation, see To Serve Them All My Days (TV series).

To Serve Them All My Days is a novel by British author R. F. Delderfield.

First published in 1972, the book was adapted for television in 1980. It has been adapted twice by Shaun McKenna, first as a stage play at the Royal Theatre Northampton (Royal & Derngate) in 1992 and again as a five-part series of 45-minute plays for BBC Radio 4, first broadcast in January 2006.

== Plot summary ==
David Powlett-Jones, a coal miner's son from South Wales, has risen from the ranks of the South Wales Borderers and been commissioned as a Second Lieutenant in World War I after serving three years in the front-line trenches. In 1918, after being injured and shell-shocked, he is employed to teach history at Bamfylde School, a fictional public school in North Devon.

Under the tutelage of Headmaster Algy Herries, who views him as a possible successor, David discovers a vocation in teaching. He swiftly earns the respect of many of his colleagues and forms a close friendship with the curmudgeonly English master, Ian Howarth, and with several students of unique personality and talents. He clashes with Carter, an ambitious science master and Commanding Officer of the school's Officer Training Corps (OTC), whose actual military service was embarrassingly brief, cut short for medical reasons. Following the Armistice, the two men disagree on whether or not the school should erect a war memorial; David loses the argument but wins the respect of Brigadier Cooper, one of the school governors.

In 1919 David marries a young nurse, Beth Marwood; shortly afterwards, they have twin daughters, Joan and Grace. Five years later, Beth and Joan are killed in a road accident; Grace is badly injured and requires many months of rehabilitation before returning home. After encouragement from one of his pupils, a distraught David contemplates life without Beth, and he carries on for the sake of Grace.

David remains concerned about life in Wales, particularly among the miners, and is politically affected by the General Strike of 1926. He returns to writing a scholarly biography of Margaret of Anjou, which he had put to one side after Beth's death. Whilst researching the book in London, he once again meets Julia Darbyshire, a teacher who had worked briefly at Bamfylde, and strikes up a romance with her.

In 1927 Herries retires; David and Carter apply for the headship, but the governors, unable to decide between them, appoint a South African named Alcock. His authoritarian management of the school makes him highly unpopular among the staff and the boys. David and Carter, faced with a common enemy, settle their differences, but Carter resigns to take over a school of his own, and several other masters also resign. In 1931 Alcock petitions the Board of Governors to dismiss David, whom he regards as the ringleader of the opposition. After being told that the Board's report will back David, Alcock dies of a heart attack while writing out his resignation. David is appointed as his successor and moves the school forward.

David's relationship with Julia ends when she travels to the USA with her boss, whom she marries. David becomes romantically involved with Christine Forster. She is determined to build a career as a Labour politician but is unable to break into this male-dominated world. They later marry. After initial difficulty adjusting to life at Bamfylde, Christine accepts a teaching position at the school and they have a son.

Julia Darbyshire's son, born soon after she moved to the USA, becomes a pupil at Bamfylde. At the end of the book Julia informs David in a letter, shortly before her death from breast cancer, that he is the boy's real father. As the book ends, World War II has begun, and David is facing the prospect of losing many of his former pupils in another war.

== Analysis ==
To Serve Them All My Days mirrors the history of Britain in the post-Great War era, casting David's experiences against the difficulties, contradictions, and social issues of the inter-war years. David's life focuses on how Britain comes to terms with the turmoil of the Great War, the General Strike, socialism and the formation of the National Government in particular.

"Bamfylde", the fictional independent school in North Devon, was influenced by West Buckland School, the school that R.F. Delderfield himself attended. The headmaster during his time there was Ernest Charles Harries and his wife was Eleanor (Nellie) on whom the characters Algy Herries and his wife are based. West Buckland School has adopted some of the names used by Delderfield in his novel, naming two new boarding houses Boyer and Bamfylde, and a new preparatory school building after Delderfield himself.

== Reception ==
A 1972 book review by Kirkus Reviews called the book "A pleasant autumnal comforter for Delderfield's following, which, if unrolled by the yard, day after day, will serve to the first snowflake." The Historical Novel Society called the book "a gentle meander of a novel that occasionally becomes a plod. Anyone who is a teacher will absolutely long for the kind of pupils who populate the pages. Even the delinquent ones are thoroughly good eggs underneath while David Powlett-Jones is an absolute saint who can set any troubled child on the right path, including the bed-wetters and illicit pipe smokers! However, that’s not to sneer. It’s a genuinely warm, comforting novel."

== See also ==
- Goodbye Mr. Chips
