= Worm's Eye View =

1951 British film by Jack Raymond

- Directed by: Jack Raymond
- Written by: R. F. Delderfield; Jack Marks
- Based on: the 1944 play by R. F. Delderfield
- Produced by: Henry Halstead
- Starring: Ronald Shiner; Garry Marsh; Diana Dors
- Cinematography: James Wilson
- Edited by: Helen Wiggins
- Music by: Tony Lowry; Tony Fones
- Production company: Henry Halstead Productions (as Byron Films)
- Distributed by: Associated British-Pathé (UK)
- Release date: April 1951 (UK)
- Running time: 77 minutes
- Country: United Kingdom
- Language: English

Worm's Eye View is a 1951 British Technicolor comedy film directed by Jack Raymond and starring Ronald Shiner and Diana Dors. It was written by R. F. Delderfield and Jack Marks based on Delderfield's 1944 play of the same name, and was produced by Henry Halsted and Byron Films.

== Plot ==
The film is set in a family home during World War II. Their bitter landlady is not pleased by five fighters from the Royal Air Force who are staying there and she re-directs unjustly her frustrations against the family.

== Cast ==
- Ronald Shiner as Sam Porter
- Garry Marsh as Pop Brownlow
- Diana Dors as Thelma
- John Blythe as Duke
- Bruce Seton as Squadron Leader Briarly
- Digby Wolfe as Corporal Mark Trelawney
- Eric Davies as Taffy
- Everley Gregg as Mrs. Bounty
- Christina Forrest as Bella Bounty
- Jonathan Field as Sydney
- William Percy as Mr Bounty

== Original play ==
The play was first staged in October 1944 by Basil Thomas, of the Wolverhampton Repertory Company. It went on tour the following spring and did well but did not transfer to London due to a shortage of theatres. However in late 1945 the play was put on at the Embassy Theatre in Hampstead and in January 1946 was transferred to the Whitehall, starring Ronald Shiner. The play was a huge success, running for five and a half years, briefly beating Chu Chin Cow as the longest running play in London. In 1952 Drama magazine wrote "There can scarcely be an adult member of the population who is not thoroughly familiar with the doings of this group of R.A.F. billetees during the war."

== Production ==
Filming took place at Hammersmith in late 1950.

== Reception ==
=== Box office ===
Worm's Eye View was the sixth most popular film at the British box office in 1951. It was particularly popular in Scotland.

=== Critical reception ===
The Monthly Film Bulletin wrote: "A screen adaptation of the popular stage comedy, Worm's Eye View would seem to have suffered or improved little in its transition. It is a comedy without a plot ... The humour is of the most hackneyed type, but in its crude way the film is competent enough."

The Daily Film Renter wrote: "Ronald Shiner is, of course, word and timing perfect in his original role of Sam Porter, and all those who saw the play will no doubt enjoy another basinful in the new medium."

TV Guide wrote, "some mild amusement is to be found here, particularly in the dialogue, though all in all this is nothing special. British filmgoers thought otherwise, though, making both the film and Shiner big successes."
