= R. F. Delderfield =

British writer (1912–1972)

- Born: Ronald Frederick Delderfield; 12 February 1912; New Cross, London, England
- Died: 24 June 1972 (aged 60); Sidmouth, Devon, England
- Occupations: Novelist, dramatist
- Writing career
- Language: English
- Years active: 1947–1972
- Genres: Fiction, theatre

Ronald Frederick Delderfield (12 February 1912 – 24 June 1972) was an English novelist and dramatist, some of whose works have been adapted for television and film.

== Biography ==
=== Childhood in London and Surrey ===
Ronald Frederick Delderfield was born at 37 Waller Road, New Cross, London, in 1912 to Alice and William James Delderfield (c. 1873–1956). His father worked for a meat wholesaler in Smithfield Market, and was the first Liberal to be elected to Bermondsey Council. William supported women's suffrage and the Boer cause in the Boer War. He was a firm supporter of the temperance movement, and of David Lloyd George until the latter allied himself in government with the Conservative Party. From 1918 to 1923, the family lived at 22 Ashburton Avenue, Addiscombe, near Croydon, Surrey. The Avenue novels were based on Ronald's life in Addiscombe and Shirley Park.

Delderfield attended an infant school in Bermondsey, then a "seedy and pretentious" small private school — "seventy boys and four underpaid ushers, presided over by a jovial gentleman who wore blue serge". He then went to a council school, which he hated, but which provided him with the prototype for Mr. Short in The Avenue. This experience was followed by a grammar school whose dedicated teachers inspired several of his characters. Once the family moved to Devon, Delderfield first attended a co-educational grammar school and, finally, West Buckland School. In his autobiography For My Own Amusement, Delderfield joked that West Buckland could be likened to schools in The Spring Madness of Mr Sermon, The Avenue and A Horseman Riding By, and that it had earned its fees three times over. Again, in For My Own Amusement, Delderfield divided the nation into city and suburb dwellers, rural dwellers, and those who lived in coastal towns.

On a family holiday in Swanage when he was young, Delderfield caught scarlet fever and had to spend three months in an isolation hospital.

=== Residence in East Devon ===
In 1923, Delderfield's father and a neighbour in Bermondsey bought the Exmouth Chronicle, a local newspaper in Exmouth, and William became the editor. In 1929, Delderfield joined the staff of the paper and later succeeded his father as editor. In For My Own Amusement, he describes his work—attending Magistrates' Courts and Council meetings, covering amateur dramatics and other events, visiting the bereaved to write local obituaries, even cycling after the fire engine to see if there was a story, as well as relying on a large number of local correspondents. His experiences during this period were clearly mirrored in the romantic novel Diana. In 1962 he had a house, 'Dove Cottage' (now 'Gazebo'), built on Peak Hill in Sidmouth.

Delderfield's first published play was produced at Birmingham Repertory Theatre in 1936; the Birmingham Post wrote "more please, Mr Delderfield". One of his plays, Worm's Eye View, had a run at the Whitehall Theatre in London, and was filmed in 1951 with Diana Dors. Following service in the RAF during World War II, he resumed his literary career, while also running an antiques business near Budleigh Salterton, Devon. Having begun with drama, Delderfield decided to switch to writing novels in the 1950s. His first novel, Seven Men of Gascony, a tale of French soldiers in the Napoleonic Wars, was published in 1949 by Werner Laurie. In 1950 he featured in a BBC Newsreel clip of the short-lived The Axminster and Lyme Regis Clarion in Lyme Regis.

=== Autobiography ===
In For My Own Amusement (1972), Delderfield discusses the inspiration for the storylines and tells in anecdotes the origin of several of his characters. He believed that authors draw inspiration from the scenes of their youth, pointing out that Charles Dickens' characters nearly always used the stagecoach, when he was writing in the age of the train. Delderfield calls his sources "character farms", the main ones being his time in Addiscombe, schooldays, and his time at the Exmouth Chronicle. Of The Avenue and A Horseman Riding By he said, "I set out to tell a straightforward story of a group of undistinguished British people—the only kind of people I really know." Delderfield pointed out in this autobiography that he had been criticized for his very conventional views of women's social roles.

=== Death ===
Delderfield died at his home, then called Dove Cottage, in Sidmouth of lung cancer, and was survived by his widow, the former May Evans, whom he married in 1936. They had a son and a daughter. A brother, Eric Delderfield (1909–1995) survived him and wrote several books on the history of England's West Country.

== Early 20th century social history as a subject of his writing ==
Several of Delderfield's historical novels and series involve young men who return from war and take up careers in peacetime that allow the author to delve deeply into social history from the Edwardian era to the early 1960s.

=== Examples ===
- David Powlett-Jones of To Serve Them All My Days is from a Welsh working-class background and begins his teaching of history at a rural public school shortly after being released from a shell-shock ward in 1918. That novel examines the changes in private education and the development of the Labour political movement between the world wars.
- Adam Swann of the God is an Englishman series is a veteran of the British Army in India who forms a transport business in the mid-19th century. The series explores the economic history of the United Kingdom from the 1860s to the outbreak of the First World War.
- In the A Horseman Riding By trilogy, Paul Craddock, also an ex-soldier, becomes a rural landlord in Delderfield's own Devon in the early 20th century.
- The two-volume work The Avenue, which follows the residents of a middle-class suburban road over a few decades, begins shortly after the end of World War I with the return of one resident, who finds that his wife has died in the Spanish flu epidemic and left him with several children to care for.

== Other works ==
Delderfield also published non-fiction books on Napoleonic history, historical novels involving the Napoleonic Wars, and some isolated novels set in more contemporary periods. His prose style tends to be straightforward and readable, lacking in any influence from post-modernist fiction, and his social attitudes are fairly traditional, though his politics, as expressed via his characters, are a mixture of progressive and free market. In general, Delderfield's novels celebrate English history, humanity, and liberalism while demonstrating little patience with entrenched class differences and snobbery yet also sometimes advocating individualism, self-reliance, and other traditional Victorian values.

Delderfield wrote The Adventures of Ben Gunn (1956), a prequel to R. L. Stevenson's Treasure Island which follows Ben Gunn from sexton's son to pirate and is narrated by Jim Hawkins in Gunn's words. It describes the life of Ben Gunn from the events which led him to leave Devon, and eventually to his presence on Treasure Island and involvement in the story told by Stevenson, and follows up with a brief summary of Ben Gunn's life afterwards.

== Select bibliography ==
Delderfield's works include:

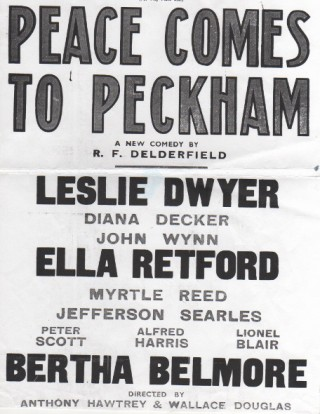
Peace Comes to Peckham in 1947 with Bertha Belmore and a young Lionel Blair

- 1944: Worm's Eye View (long-running stage comedy; London premiere 1945; filmed in 1951)
- 1947: All Over the Town
- 1947: The Fascinating History of Budleigh and District
- 1949: Seven Men of Gascony
- 1950: Farewell the Tranquil Mind
- 1953: The Orchard Walls (stage play at London's St. Martin's Theatre, filmed as Now and Forever (1956))
- 1956: The Adventures of Ben Gunn (a companion novel to Stevenson's Treasure Island telling of events which occurred before that book begins)
- 1958: The Dreaming Suburb (Avenue series)
- 1958: The Avenue Goes to War (Avenue series)
- 1960: There was a Fair Maid Dwelling (combined with The Unjust Skies to form Diana, 1979)
- 1961: Stop at a Winner (filmed as On the Fiddle) (1961)
- 1962: The Unjust Skies (combined with There was a Fair Maid Dwelling to form Diana, 1979)
- 1962: The March of the Twenty-Six: The Story of Napoleon's Marshals
- 1963: Mr. Sermon (also published as The Spring Madness of Mr. Sermon)
- 1963: Tales Out of School: An Anthology of West Buckland Reminiscences, 1895–1963
- 1964: Too Few For Drums
- 1964: The Golden Millstones: Napoleon's Brothers and Sisters
- 1966: A Horseman Riding By (published in the United States as two novels, Long Summer Day and Post of Honor)
- 1967: Cheap Day Return
- 1967: Retreat from Moscow
- 1968: The Green Gauntlet (sequel to A Horseman Riding By)
- 1969: Come Home Charlie and Face Them (also published as Come Home Charlie)
- 1969: Imperial Sunset: The Fall of Napoleon, 1813–14
- 1969: Napoleon in Love
- 1970: Overture For Beginners (autobiographical)
- 1970: God is an Englishman (Swann saga)
- 1972: Theirs was the Kingdom (Swann saga)
- 1972: For My Own Amusement (autobiographical)
- 1972: To Serve Them All My Days
- 1973: Give Us This Day (Swann saga)
- 1979: Diana, see 1960; 1962

Series

- 1958: The Dreaming Suburb and The Avenue Goes to War belong to the "Avenue series"
- 1966–1968: A Horseman Riding By is a trilogy comprising "Long Summer's Day", "Post of Honour" and "The Green Gauntlet".
- 1970–1973: God is an Englishman, Theirs was the Kingdom, and Give Us This Day belong to the "Swann saga"

== Adaptations ==
British TV has made five series based on Delderfield's books. Nigel Havers played Paul Craddock in BBC TV's A Horseman Riding By (1978), adapted from the eponymous novel. John Duttine played David Powlett-Jones in BBC TV's To Serve Them All My Days (1980), adapted by Andrew Davies from the eponymous novel and Archie Carver in London Weekend Television's People Like Us (1977), adapted from the Avenue novels. Diana was adapted in 1984 into a BBC miniseries starring Jenny Seagrove in the title role and Patsy Kensit as her younger self. Come Home Charlie and Face Them was adapted as a mini-series by London Weekend Television in 1990.

The first Carry On film, Carry On Sergeant (1958), was based on Delderfield's play The Bull Boys. A 1961 film On the Fiddle starring Sean Connery was based on Delderfield's novel Stop at a Winner. His play Worm's Eye View was filmed with Diana Dors under its original title. The 1956 film Now and Forever was based on his play The Orchard Walls.
