= Cheap Day Return (novel) =

1967 novel by R. F. Delderfield

- First edition
- Author: R.F. Delderfield
- Language: English
- Genre: Drama
- Publisher: Hodder & Stoughton
- Publication date: 1967
- Publication place: United Kingdom
- Media type: Print

Cheap Day Return is a 1967 novel by the British writer R.F. Delderfield. A man with the name Kent Stuart, once a small town photographer, returns to his home of Redcliffe Bay, in the West Country, after an absence of thirty years. He left it as a fugitive from what then seemed to all concerned a shameful scandal; he finds it vastly changed and unrecognizable. This Cheap Day Return is his own way of effecting a personal adjustment and coming to terms with the haunting memories of what happened to him here in the year 1932, when he was caught up in a passionate affair with Lorna Morney-Sutcliffe, the wife of the most prominent citizen of Redcliffe Bay. It cost him his youth and happiness; it lost him the girl he was going to marry, Esta Wallace, the local Carnival Queen. His return enables him to reconstruct the whole episode, from the January night it began, to the December night when it ended in tragedy.

== Bibliography ==
- Sternlicht, Sanford. R.F. Delderfield. Twayne Publishers, 1988.
- R.F. Delderfield (1967). Cheap Day Return. England: Hazell Watson and Viney Ltd. pp. Prelims.
