= Tenko (TV series) =

British-Australian drama series, 1981–1985

- Title caption that was seen throughout the series.
- Created by: Lavinia Warner
- Written by: Jill Hyem; Anne Valery; Paul Wheeler
- Directed by: Pennant Roberts; David Askey; David Tucker; Jeremy Summers; Michael Owen Morris
- Starring: Ann Bell; Stephanie Cole; Stephanie Beacham; Louise Jameson; Patricia Lawrence; Veronica Roberts; Emily Bolton; Jeananne Crowley; Elizabeth Chambers; Claire Oberman; Jean Anderson; Burt Kwouk; Rosemary Martin; Elizabeth Mickery
- Theme music composer: James Harpham
- Country of origin: United Kingdom
- Original language: English
- No. of series: 3, plus 1 feature length reunion special
- No. of episodes: 31

Production
- Producers: Ken Riddington; Vere Lorrimer
- Running time: 50 minutes

Original release
- Network: BBC1
- Release: 22 October 1981 – 26 December 1985

Tenko is a television drama series co-produced by the BBC and the Australian Broadcasting Corporation (ABC), which was broadcast between 22 October 1981 and 26 December 1985.

The series dealt with the experiences of British, Australian and Dutch women who were captured after the Fall of Singapore in February 1942, after the Japanese invasion, and held in a fictional Japanese internment camp on a Japanese-occupied island in the Dutch East Indies in modern-day Indonesia between Singapore and Australia (the actual location of the island is not revealed in the series but it is assumed that the fictitious locations are set in south east Sumatra). Having been separated from their husbands, herded into makeshift holding camps and largely forgotten by the British War Office, the women had to learn to cope with appalling living conditions, malnutrition, disease, sexual violence and death.

== Background ==
Tenko was created by Lavinia Warner after she had conducted research into the internment of nursing corps officer Margot Turner (1910–1993) for an edition of television programme This Is Your Life and was convinced of the dramatic potential of the stories of women prisoners of the Japanese. Aside from the first two episodes, set in Singapore, which were written by Paul Wheeler, the series was written by Jill Hyem and Anne Valery. War hero and prisoner of war Margaret Thomson was consulted about the series but she did not like to talk about her experiences and never watched the programmes.

Owing to high production costs, only the first two episodes of the first series were filmed on location in Singapore, together with the post series reunion extended episode. For the majority of series 1 and 2, set in the camp, the programme was filmed in a specially constructed set in Dorset. Hankley Common was also used.

The series takes its name from the Japanese word tenko (点呼) which means "roll-call". POWs and internees in Japanese-run camps had regular roll-calls, where they had to line up and number off or were counted in Japanese.

A total of thirty episodes were produced over three series between 1981 and 1984, followed by a one-off special (which was twice the length of the other episodes), Tenko Reunion, in 1985. Only Ann Bell, Stephanie Cole and Claire Oberman appeared in all thirty episodes plus the reunion.

=== Series One (1981) ===
Ten fifty-minute episodes broadcast 22 October to 24 December 1981.

The first series depicts the events leading up to the fall of Singapore to the invading Japanese forces in 1942, and the abortive evacuation of civilians from the city. As the war in Europe suddenly erupts into a world war, a group of British and Dutch women find themselves forced to cope with captivity in a Japanese internment camp. They also must find a way to live together as a community, breaking down the barriers of class and race between them, if they are to survive.

Marion Jefferson is enlisted as the leader of the women due to her husband being a colonel. Sylvia Ashburton learns to see past race when she begins to bond with Christina Campbell. Dorothy Bennett suffers the loss of her infant daughter, Violet, due to malnutrition. A pregnant Sally Markham suffers the tragedy of stillbirth. Sally then grows close to nurse Nellie Keane, and rumours begin to circulate about their intimacy.

In the last episode of the series, the women celebrate Christmas before being marched through the jungle to another camp.

=== Series Two (1982) ===
Ten fifty-minute episodes broadcast 21 October to 23 December 1982.

The second series continues with the women marching through the jungle and being split up before they arrive at a new camp, an old mission school, on New Year's Day 1943. Tensions arise as the internees are forced to adhere to the new regime implemented by the strict and fierce official interpreter, Miss Hasan.

After a joyous reunion with old friend, Lillian, Marion is forced to take a back seat as the women's official leader in favour of the overbearing wolf in sheep's clothing, Verna Johnson. Sally sinks into depression following the death of her husband and vows to take her own life. Dorothy continues to trade favours with the guards, teaching English to Shinya in exchange for cigarettes and later discovers that she is pregnant. Sister Ulrica vows to not speak in order to repent for her feelings of hate towards the Japanese. Blanche returns later in the series, as does Yamauchi, as he is promoted to Major and becomes the new commander. Rose escapes to meet Bernard but they are caught when one of the women informs Yamauchi.

As conditions in the camp worsen, the women take a stand against Verna and Miss Hasan but they are prevented from exposing them when an allied plane bombs the camp.

=== Series Three (1984) ===
Ten fifty-minute episodes broadcast 7 October to 16 December 1984.

The third series starts just before the end of the war in early August 1945. The internees are in their third camp and are living under appalling and harsh conditions with Marion Jefferson once again being leader of the group. The remaining prisoners of the camps are told by Yamauchi that the war has ended. They are later liberated by Allied troops and travel to Singapore. Billeted at Raffles, the women are free. However, peacetime only brings further dilemmas for the women as they struggle to forge new futures in an uncertain new world.

Marion struggles as she assumes the role of the "colonel's wife" which causes friction between her and Clifford. Joss strikes up a relationship with Stephen. Maggie and Dorothy become embroiled in a love triangle with the handsome rogue, Jake.

=== Tenko Reunion (1985) ===
A double-length special was broadcast on 26 December 1985.

Set in 1950, Marion organises for the women to reunite in Singapore five years after their liberation from the camp. After an evening at Raffles Hotel, the women plan to continue their celebrations the following day at the residence of 'Metro Goldwyn' van Meyer but they are interrupted by the infiltration from communist guerrillas in search of weapons and ammunition, leading to a shocking revelation about one of the women.

== Main cast list ==
Character	Actor	Series			
Character	Actor	Series 1	Series 2	Series 3	Reunion
Marion Jefferson	Ann Bell				
Beatrice Mason	Stephanie Cole				
Rose Millar	Stephanie Beacham				
Sister Ulrica	Patricia Lawrence				
Christina Campbell	Emily Bolton				
Dorothy Bennett	Veronica Roberts				
Kate Norris	Claire Oberman				
Mrs Domenica Van Meyer	Elizabeth Chambers				
Blanche Simmons	Louise Jameson				
Nellie Keene	Jeananne Crowley				
Sylvia Ashburton	Renée Asherson				
Sally Markham	Joanna Hole				
Debbie Bowen	Karin Foley				
Judith Bowen	Ann Queensberry				
Major Yamauchi	Burt Kwouk				
Captain Sato	Eiji Kusuhara				
Shinya	Takashi Kawahara				
Kasaki	Takahiro Oba				
Colonel Clifford Jefferson	Jonathan Newth				
Lady Jocelyn 'Joss' Holbrook	Jean Anderson				
Verna Johnson	Rosemary Martin				
Daisy Robertson	Anna Lindup				
Lillian Cartland	Philippa Urquhart				
Natalie Trier	Carrolle Rousseau				
Miss Hasan	Josephine Welcome				
Lt. Nakamura	Sabu Kimura				
Bobby Cartland	Nicolas Corry				
Suzy Parkin	Kerry Tovey				
Maggie Thorpe	Elizabeth Mickery				
Alice Courtenay	Cindy Shelley				
Phyllis Bristow	Elspet Gray				
Jake Haulter	Damien Thomas				
Stephen Wentworth	Preston Lockwood				
Colonel Smithers	Stephen Gordon				
Teddy Forster-Brown	Robert Lang				
Duncan Fraser	Christian Rodska				
Lau Peng	Swee Hoe Lim				

== DVD release and books ==
All three series plus the Reunion Special were released in one DVD box-set in 2011 through Acorn Media UK.

Three paperback books were published in the 1980s. One covering the first series, titled Tenko, while a second called Last Tenko, covered the second and final series. The third book, written by Anne Valery, covered the Reunion.

A book about the making of Tenko called Remembering Tenko by Andy Priestner was published in October 2012.

Additionally, Tenko is regularly mentioned in the BBC Radio 4 series Ed Reardon's Week (in which Stephanie Cole also played the character Olive), as the eponymous author often cites "my episode of Tenko" amongst his output.
