= Ken Riddington =

Ken Riddington (8 May 1922 – 26 December 2014) was an English television producer, who worked predominantly in BBC television drama from the 1970s onwards.

Riddington was born in Leicester. Originally a stage actor, "truly dreadful" according to Riddington himself, he moved to a back stage role managing the Adelphi Theatre from 1950 and then directing the musical Rendezvous at the Comedy Theatre in 1952. Later, he managed the London Palladium and Palace Theatres in London's West End. After a period as a BBC television floor manager in the early 1970s, he became a producer. His first project as a producer to gain recognition was the 10 part serial adaptation of Anna Karenina (1977).

Subsequently Riddington produced several high-profile television series and serials, including A Horseman Riding By (1978), Tenko (1981), To Serve Them All My Days (1981), The Citadel (1983), Diana (1984), The House of Eliott (1991) and Andrew Davies's adaptations of Michael Dobbs' House of Cards trilogy — House of Cards (1990), To Play the King (1993) and The Final Cut (1995). Riddington was involved with several other projects scripted by Davies, including A Very Peculiar Practice (1986–88), a black comedy set in a university medical centre.

For a time during the 1980s, he was the acting Head of Series & Serials in the BBC drama department, before returning to front-line producing work. Ending his period at the BBC at the age of 75, he and his wife Liz Riddington enjoyed twelve years of retirement before Ken moved to a London nursing home, where he was treated for dementia.

Riddington died on 26 December 2014.
