= Lavinia Warner =

British television writer and producer

Lavinia Mary Warner (born 27 April 1950) is a British television writer and producer. She created several successful TV series in the 1980s and 1990s, all of which featured women in the leading roles. These included the World War II female internee drama Tenko (1981-5) for the BBC, secret agent drama Wish Me Luck (1988–90) for London Weekend Television (LWT) and the taxi-firm series Rides (1992-3), again for the BBC. For the latter two series she also acted as producer. Warner is now the CEO of Warner Sisters, an independent production company.

== Early life ==
She originated from Pleasley, on the A617 road, on the Derbyshire-Nottinghamshire boundary. She boarded at Queen Elizabeth's Grammar School, Ashbourne, then attended the sixth form at Queen Elizabeth's Grammar School for Girls in Mansfield. She studied History and Psychology at Cardiff University.

== Career ==
Warner became a PA in the drama department at London Weekend Television (LWT), before moving on to Thames Television as a researcher, mainly on This is Your Life. After this she worked in the BBC Features, Current Affairs and Drama departments as a freelance producer and director. After the launch of Channel 4 in 1982, she set up her own independent production company, Warner Sisters, which initially focussed on making television programmes. She set up a production company with television producer Jane Wellesley, the sister of Charles Wellesley, 9th Duke of Wellington.

In 1983 she published "Women Beyond the Wire: A Story of Prisoners of the Japanese 1942-45" which she had co-written.

== Television programmes ==
- 1979:
- Women in Captivity
- A Life with Crime
- Private Lives
- 1981-84: Tenko
- 1984: GI Brides (won the Broadcasting Press Guild Award and was BAFTA nominated for Best Documentary)
- 1985: Tenko Reunion
- 1985: Lizzie - An Amazon Adventure (about adventuress Lizzie Hessel)
- 1987: Wish Me Luck
- 1991: Selling Hitler (based on the book by Robert Harris)
- 1992: Rides
- 1995: Dangerous Lady
- 1995: A Village Affair
- 1996: The Bite
- 1998: The Jump
- 2001: Do or Die
- 2011: The Runaway

== Other activities ==
- One-time Vice-Chair of PACT
- One-time Edinburgh Television Festival committee member
- An original member of the 25% Campaign for increased Independent access to the BBC and ITV
- Consultant to Hollywood director Bruce Beresford on his feature film Paradise Road. Warner's book Women Beyond the Wire: A Story of Prisoners of the Japanese 1942-45 (co-written with John Sandilands) was the prime source material for the film.
