= Deaths in January 2025 =

The following is a list of notable deaths in January 2025.

Entries for each day are listed alphabetically by surname. A typical entry lists information in the following sequence:

- Name, age, country of citizenship at birth, subsequent country of citizenship (if applicable), reason for notability, cause of death (if known), and reference.

== January 2025 ==
=== 1 ===
- A.D.O.R., 55, American rapper.
- Viktor Alksnis, 74, Russian politician, mayor of Tuchkovo (2013–2015), MP (2000–2007), and deputy of the Soviet Union (1989–1991).
- Geoffrey Bell, 85, English economist and banker.
- William Carter, 90, American photographer.
- Jean Céard, 88, French historian and academic.
- Leo Dan, 82, Argentine singer, composer and actor (Story of a Poor Young Man, Cómo te extraño).
- Jean-Michel Defaye, 92, French composer and pianist.
- Roswitha Erlenwein, 94, German politician, member of the Bürgerschaft of Bremen (1983–1995).
- Mike Farmer, 88, American basketball player (St. Louis Hawks, New York Knicks, Cincinnati Royals) and coach.
- Jack Ferguson, 94, Scottish Olympic water polo player (1952, 1956).
- Joan Guinovart, 77, Spanish biochemist.
- Helen Hogan, 101, New Zealand Māori academic.
- Pradeep Hemsingh Jadhav, 70, Indian politician, MLA (2004–2019).
- Kaak, 84, Indian cartoonist (Jansatta, Navbharat Times, Dainik Jagran), heart attack.
- Vladimir Kosykh, 74, Russian politician, MP (1993–1995).
- Jean-Louis Lalanne, 70, French footballer (Bordeaux, Libourne).
- Elke Leonhard, 75, German politician, MP (1990–2005).
- David Lodge, 89, British author (Changing Places, Small World: An Academic Romance, The Picturegoers).
- Michael Loewe, 102, British historian, Sinologist and writer.
- K. S. Manilal, 86, Indian botany scholar and taxonomist.
- Rosita Missoni, 93, Italian knitwear designer, co-founder of Missoni, pneumonia.
- Henry P. Monaghan, 90, American legal scholar.
- Joseph Monninger, 71, American novelist (The Letters), lung cancer.
- Chad Morgan, 91, Australian country singer and guitarist (The Sheik of Scrubby Creek).
- Viktor Nastashevskyi, 67, Ukrainian footballer (Dynamo Kyiv, CSKA Kyiv, Kryvbas Kryvyi Rih).
- Noh Haeng-seok, 36, South Korean footballer (Gwangju, Daegu, Busan IPark).
- Gilbert Normand, 81, Canadian politician, MP (1997–2004).
- Sally Oppenheim-Barnes, Baroness Oppenheim-Barnes, 96, British politician, minister of state for consumer affairs (1979–1982), MP (1970–1987), and member of the House of Lords (1989–2019).
- John B. O'Reilly Jr., 76, American politician, mayor of Dearborn, Michigan (2007–2022).
- Nora Orlandi, 91, Italian musician and film composer (The Strange Vice of Mrs. Wardh, Johnny Yuma, Clint the Stranger).
- Wayne Osmond, 73, American singer (The Osmonds) and songwriter ("Crazy Horses", "Let Me In"), stroke.
- Vittorio Pomilio, 91, Italian basketball player (Stella Azzurra Roma, national team).
- Igor Poznič, 57, Slovenian footballer (NK Maribor, Mura, national team).
- Nelson Pryor, 82, American politician, member of the New Hampshire House of Representatives (1973–1974).
- Ripken, 8, American retrieval dog (Durham Bulls).
- Leonid Safronov, 86, Russian politician, member of the Congress of People's Deputies of Russia (1990–1993).
- Louis Schittly, 86, French physician and humanitarian, co-founder of Médecins Sans Frontières.
- Maria Grazia Sestero, 82, Italian politician, deputy (1992–1994).
- Zdzisław Skupień, 86, Polish mathematician.
- Olesya Vadimovna Sokur, 64, Ukrainian biologist and academic, drone strike.
- Tom Wyatt, 78, Australian horticulturalist.

=== 2 ===
- Jytte Abildstrøm, 90, Danish actress (Helle for Helene, Don Olsen kommer til byen, The Adventures of Picasso).
- Mary Abrams, 66, American politician, member of the Connecticut State Senate (2019–2023), glioblastoma.
- Aldo Agroppi, 80, Italian football player (Torino, national team) and manager (Fiorentina), pneumonia.
- Kabira Uddina Ahmed, Bangladeshi politician, MP (1996).
- Francesc Antich, 66, Venezuelan-born Spanish politician, president of the government of the Balearic Islands (1999–2003, 2007–2011) and senator (2011–2019), cancer.
- Atmakusumah Astraatmadja, 86, Indonesian journalist (Indonesia Raya).
- Brian Berry, 90, British-American human geographer and planner.
- Wilhelm Brückner, 92, German luthier.
- Gerard Caris, 99, Dutch sculptor and artist.
- Gay Caswell, 76, Canadian politician, Saskatchewan MLA (1982–1986).
- Lex Clark, 81, New Zealand Olympic rower (1964).
- Bernie Constantin, 77, Swiss songwriter and radio show host.
- Tidiane Diakité, 80, Malian-born French historian and writer.
- Pedro Luis García Pérez, 86, Spanish mathematician, physicist and academic, president of the Royal Spanish Mathematical Society (1982–1988).
- Pieter Hofstra, 78, Dutch politician, member of the House of Representatives (1994–2006) and Senate (2007–2011).
- James R. Hogg, 90, American admiral.
- Derek Humphry, 94, British-American assisted suicide activist (Jean's Way, Final Exit), co-founder of Final Exit Network, heart failure.
- Ágnes Keleti, 103, Hungarian-Israeli artistic gymnast, Olympic champion (1952, 1956), pneumonia.
- Larry Kish, 83, American ice hockey coach (Hartford Whalers).
- Karol Krasnodębski, 95, Polish politician, MP (1989–1991).
- Seymour P. Lachman, 91, American political historian and politician, member of the New York State Senate (1996–2004).
- Werner Leimgruber, 90, Swiss footballer (Zürich, national team).
- Govind Sharan Lohra, 69, Indian folk singer, songwriter and dancer.
- Italo de Lorenzo, 85, Italian bobsledder.
- Ralph Mann, 75, American Hall of Fame sprinter and hurdler, Olympic silver medalist (1972).
- Roger Mantovani, 59, Italian radio presenter and voice actor.
- David Marler, 83, Canadian lawyer.
- Joyce McRoberts, 83, American politician, member of the Idaho Senate (1992–1995).
- S. Jayachandran Nair, 85, Indian journalist, founder of Samakalika Malayalam Vaarika.
- Russ North, 59, English heavy metal singer (Cloven Hoof).
- Pádraig Ó Snodaigh, 89, Irish activist and writer.
- Cristóbal Ortega, 68, Mexican footballer (América, national team), cancer.
- Derek Parker, 92, British writer and broadcaster.
- Noreen Riols, 98, British novelist and SOE agent during World War II.
- Arun Roy, 56, Bangladeshi film director.
- Thomas Streicher, 66, Austrian mathematician.
- J. R. P. Suriyapperuma, 96, Sri Lankan politician, MP (2010–2015).
- Ferdi Tayfur, 79, Turkish singer and actor.
- Paul Weldon, 88, Canadian musician and architect.
- John Wijngaards, 89, Dutch Catholic scholar and priest.
- Ján Zachara, 96, Slovak boxer, Olympic champion (1952).

=== 3 ===
- Jeff Baena, 47, American film director and screenwriter (The Little Hours, Horse Girl, Spin Me Round), suicide by hanging.
- Hans Dieter Beck, 92, German publisher (Verlag C. H. Beck).
- Emmanuel Bonde, 77, Cameroonian politician.
- Bertrand Bouvier, 95, Swiss writer and translator.
- Morris Bradshaw, 72, American football player (Oakland Raiders, New England Patriots), Super Bowl champion (1977, 1981).
- José Brouwers, 93, Belgian stage director and actor.
- Gualtiero Busato, 83, Italian-born French sculptor.
- Howard Buten, 74, American author and clown.
- Mukesh Chandrakar, 32, Indian journalist, blunt force injuries. (body discovered on this date)
- Choi Sang-yeop, 87, South Korean lawyer and politician, minister of legislation (1990–1992) and justice (1997).
- La Chunga, 87, French-born Spanish flamenco dancer and painter.
- Kate Coolahan, 95, Australian-born New Zealand commercial artist, fashion illustrator and printmaker.
- Zlatko Dupovac, 72, Bosnian footballer (Sarajevo, Borac Banja Luka, St. Gallen).
- Sergio Elgueta, 91, Chilean politician, deputy (1990–2002), mayor of Puerto Montt (1971–1973).
- Futuregrapher, 41, Icelandic electronic musician, injuries sustained in a traffic collision.
- Ernesto Gianella, 83, Argentine-French footballer (AS Béziers, Nîmes).
- Sajad Haider, 92, Pakistani fighter pilot.
- Hiroshi Hara, 88, Japanese architect (Kyōto Station, Umeda Sky Building, Sapporo Dome).
- Richard B. Hays, 76, American theologian.
- William Leo Higi, 91, American Roman Catholic prelate, bishop of Lafayette (1984–2010).
- Christopher Hood, 77, British academic.
- Donal Kelly, 86, Irish journalist and broadcaster (RTÉ News).
- Willem van Kooten, 83, Dutch disc jockey and businessman.
- Harvey Laidman, 82, American television director (Matlock, 7th Heaven, The Waltons), cancer.
- Benny Lautrup, 85, Danish theoretical physicist.
- Niko Lekishvili, 77, Georgian politician, state minister (1995–1998), mayor of Tbilisi (1993–1995).
- Robert Loewy, 98, American aerospace engineer.
- Richard Louis, 60, Barbadian Olympic sprinter (1984, 1988).
- Majda Ra'ad, 82, Swedish-born Jordanian Hashemite princess.
- Constantine Manos, 90, Greek-born American photographer.
- Barbara Maxwell, 81, British television producer (Question Time).
- Kay McDaniel, 67, American tennis player.
- Dashbaldangiin Purevsuren, 95, Mongolian opera singer.
- Frank Peasley, 81, American politician.
- Andrew Pyper, 56, Canadian writer, complications from cancer.
- James Arthur Ray, 67, American self-help businessman, author and convicted felon.
- Yuji Sawa, 76, Japanese politician, MP (2004–2010), pneumonia.
- Peter Schaap, 78, Dutch singer and writer.
- Aidan Smyth, 58, British major general.
- Rod Sykes, 95, Canadian politician, mayor of Calgary (1969–1977).
- Dame Tariana Turia, 80, New Zealand politician, MP (1996–2014) and minister for the community and voluntary sector (2003–2004, 2008–2011), founder of Te Pāti Māori, stroke.
- Brian Usher, 80, English footballer (Sunderland, Sheffield Wednesday, Doncaster Rovers).
- Gilbert Van Binst, 73, Belgian footballer (Anderlecht, Club Brugge, national team).
- Bob Veale, 89, American baseball player (Pittsburgh Pirates, Boston Red Sox).
- Clyde Vickers, 73, American motorsport executive.
- The Vivienne, 32, British drag queen (RuPaul's Drag Race UK, RuPaul's Drag Race All Stars, Dancing on Ice), cardiac arrest.
- Thomas R. Williams, 85, Canadian academic and university administrator, principal of Queen's University (2008–2009).
- Brenton Wood, 83, American singer ("The Oogum Boogum Song", "Gimme Little Sign").
- Amit Yoran, 54, American cybersecurity executive, CEO of Tenable, Inc. (2017–2024), cancer.
- Bratislav Živković, 49, Serbian mercenary, killed in action.

=== 4 ===
- Mathías Acuña, 32, Uruguayan footballer (Lamia), suicide.
- Claude Allègre, 87, French geochemist and politician, minister of national education (1997–2000).
- Ed Askew, 84, American painter and singer-songwriter.
- Porter Bibb, 87, American investment banker and magazine publisher (Rolling Stone), complications from prostate cancer.
- Frank Blackwell, 77, American politician, member of the West Virginia House of Delegates (1976–1982, 2016), sarcoma.
- Y. Michal Bodemann, 80, German-born Canadian sociologist.
- Peter Brandes, 80, Danish painter and sculptor.
- Daniel J. Brass, 77, American organizational theorist.
- Samuel Butler, 94, American lawyer.
- Rajagopala Chidambaram, 88, Indian nuclear physicist (Smiling Buddha, Pokhran-II), principal scientific adviser to the government (2002–2018).
- José Claer, 61, Canadian poet and author.
- Colm Connolly, 82, Irish journalist (RTÉ News, BBC News).
- Bruce Dohrenwend, 97, American psychologist.
- Brian Dunsby, 84, British perlite industry executive.
- Franjo Džidić, 85, Bosnian football player (Velež Mostar) and manager (Široki Brijeg, Zrinjski Mostar).
- Emilio Echevarría, 80, Mexican actor (Amores perros, Die Another Day, The Alamo).
- Ben Espy, 81, American politician, member of the Ohio Senate (1992–2002).
- Billy Fallin, 92, American politician, member of the Georgia House of Representatives (1967–1971).
- Gerardo Fernández, 71, Cuban Olympic weightlifter (1976, 1980).
- Richard Foreman, 87, American playwright (Rhoda in Potatoland), pneumonia.
- Ana Gligić, 90, Serbian virologist.
- Elisabeth Haarr, 78, Norwegian artist.
- Mohsen Habacha, 82, Tunisian footballer (Sahel, Ajaccio, national team).
- Frank Haigh, 93, English rugby league player (Wakefield Trinity, Keighley).
- Zoltán Halmosi, 77, Hungarian footballer (Haladás, national team). (death announced on this date)
- Oleksandr Humenyuk, 48, Ukrainian football player (CSKA Kyiv, Chornomorets Odesa) and manager (Bukovyna Chernivtsi).
- Saka Isau, 69, Nigerian politician.
- Barry Kramer, 82, American basketball player (San Francisco Warriors, New York Knicks) and jurist, judge of the New York State Supreme Court (2009–2012).
- Raphaël Larrère, 82, French agricultural engineer.
- Sine Larsen, 81, Danish structural chemist.
- Domini Lawrence, 99, British Olympic equestrian (1968, 1972).
- Charles Le Guin, 97, American historian.
- Eleanor Maguire, 54, Irish neuroscientist, spinal cancer.
- Donald McQuillan, 90, Irish mathematician.
- Shirah Neiman, 81, American lawyer.
- Arigo Padovan, 97, Italian road racing cyclist.
- Julien Poulin, 78, Canadian actor and film director (Minuit, le soir, Babine).
- Dick Price, 91, American politician, member of the Florida House of Representatives (1973–1976).
- Karen Pryor, 92, American behavioral psychologist and author.
- Jenny Randerson, Baroness Randerson, 76, Welsh politician and peer, acting deputy first minister of Wales (2001–2002) and member of the House of Lords (since 2011).
- Riro, 17, Japanese sea otter.
- Robert Sedler, 89, American legal scholar.
- Anjana Sultana, 69, Bangladeshi actress (Parineeta, Ashikkhito), lung infection.
- Dennis True, 36, German politician, member of the Landtag of Lower Saxony (since 2022), cancer.
- Kanoko Tsutani-Mabuchi, 86, Japanese Olympic diver (1956, 1960, 1964), pneumonia.
- Yılmaz Urul, 82, Turkish footballer (İstanbulspor, Mersin İdmanyurdu, national team).
- Nuhu Yaqub, 73, Nigerian political scientist.
- Ronnie Yeskel, 76, American casting director (Pulp Fiction, Reservoir Dogs, Curb Your Enthusiasm), cancer.

=== 5 ===
- Charles Abbott, 85, Australian rules footballer (Hawthorn).
- Gerd Achterberg, 84, German football player (Spandauer BC) and manager (Tennis Borussia Berlin, BFC Südring).
- Benoît Allemane, 82, French voice actor.
- Clinton Bailey, 88, American-Israeli political scientist.
- Joe Barnett, 95, American politician, member of the Montana House of Representatives (1991–2001).
- Joseph Bendounga, 70, Central African lawyer and politician, mayor of Bangui (1997–2000).
- Philippa Blair, 79, New Zealand artist.
- Orlando Cabrales Martínez, 85, Colombian chemical engineer and politician, minister of mines and energy (1997–1998) and economic development (1996–1997).
- Beej Chaney, 68, American musician (The Suburbs).
- Anne-Marie Comparini, 77, French politician, deputy (2002–2007) and president of Rhône-Alpes (1999–2004).
- Na D'Souza, 87, Indian novelist.
- John Douglas, 90, Scottish rugby union player (Barbarian, British & Irish Lions, national team), stroke.
- Michael Falzon, 79, Maltese architect and politician, MP (1976–1996).
- John Ferguson, 83, American organist.
- Robert Hübner, 76, German chess grandmaster, stomach cancer.
- Ron James, 96, American politician, mayor of San Jose, California (1967–1971).
- S. A. Khaleque, Bangladeshi politician, MP (1979–1990, 1996, 2001–2006).
- Lee Hoesung, 89, Japanese-South Korean novelist.
- Fredrik Lindgren, 53, Swedish heavy metal musician (Unleashed, Terra Firma).
- Al MacNeil, 89, Canadian ice hockey player (Toronto Maple Leafs, Chicago Blackhawks) and coach (Calgary Flames).
- Olga Marlin, 90, American-born Kenyan educator and writer.
- Kunioki Mima, 79, Japanese plasma physicist.
- Prabir Mitra, 83, Bangladeshi actor (Titash Ekti Nadir Naam, Boro Bhalo Lok Chhilo, Buk Fatey To Mukh Foteyna).
- Bernd Nothofer, 83, German linguist.
- Sèmèvo Orisha Oké, 48, Beninese singer.
- María Páramo, 61, Colombian paleontologist, geologist and museum director.
- Danuta Ptaszycka-Jackowska, 85, Polish geographer, landscape architect and educator.
- Raquel Rabinovich, 95, Argentine-American artist, cancer.
- Anisur Rahman, 91, Bangladeshi economist.
- Mike Rinder, 69, Australian-American Scientology executive (1982–2007) and writer (A Billion Years), esophageal cancer.
- Salvador Rivera, 96, Peruvian Olympic boxer.
- Jim Short, 58, Australian-born American comedian, stomach illness.
- Costas Simitis, 88, Greek politician, prime minister (1996–2004), and MP (1985–2009).
- František Šmahel, 90, Czech historian.
- Andreas Stenglein, 95, German politician, member of the Landtag of Bavaria (1958–1962, 1963–1966).
- Masahiro Tabata, 85, Japanese politician, member of the House of Representatives (1993–2009), pneumonia.
- Geoffrey Tattersall, 77, British jurist and Anglican priest.
- Alberto Varillas, 90, Peruvian lawyer, politician, and writer, minister of education (1992–1993).
- Juan Manuel Villa, 86, Spanish footballer (Plus Ultra, Real Zaragoza, national team).
- Wang Zhengguo, 89, Chinese field medical engineer.
- Freddy Zix, 89, French footballer (Pierrots Vauban Strasbourg, RC Strasbourg, 1968 Olympics).

=== 6 ===
- Annette Carter, 83, American politician, member of the Connecticut House of Representatives (1988–2005).
- Alok Chatterjee, 64, Indian theatre actor and director, multiple organ failure.
- Giuseppe Chiaravalloti, 90, Italian jurist and politician, president of Calabria (2000–2005).
- Austin de Lone, 78, American keyboardist, idiopathic pulmonary fibrosis.
- Bulcha Demeksa, 94, Ethiopian politician, MP (2005–2010).
- Gabriel Dengaki, 72, Congolese footballer (Étoile du Congo, CARA Brazzaville, national team).
- Sir Thomas Dunne, 91, British military officer, lord lieutenant of Hereford and Worcester (1977–1998), Herefordshire (1998–2008) and Worcestershire (1998–2001).
- Raymond Durand, 79, French politician, deputy (2008–2012), mayor of Chaponnay (since 1989).
- Henny Eman, 76, Aruban politician, prime minister (1986–1989, 1994–2001).
- Jorge Flores, 70, Mexican Olympic basketball player (1976).
- Dwight Foster, 67, Canadian ice hockey player (Detroit Red Wings, Boston Bruins, Colorado Rockies).
- Hope Foye, 103, American folk singer.
- John Granara, 81, American politician, member of the Massachusetts House of Representatives (1977–1979).
- Stella Greka, 102, Greek singer and actress.
- Giovanni Grignolo, 95, Italian Olympic equestrian (1960).
- Aristide Gunnella, 93, Italian politician, deputy (1968–1992) and minister for regional affairs (1987–1988).
- John S. Hunkin, 79, Canadian banker, chairman (1999–2003) and president (2003–2004) of the CIBC.
- Panya Kritcharoen, 75, Thai Roman Catholic prelate, bishop of Ratchaburi (2005–2023).
- Dušan Maravić, 85, Serbian footballer (Red Star Belgrade, Racing Paris, Yugoslavia national team), Olympic champion (1960).
- Brian Matusz, 37, American baseball player (Baltimore Orioles, Chicago Cubs), drug overdose.
- Olga Meshoe Washington, 42, South African attorney.
- Milorad Milinković, 59, Serbian film director (Frozen Stiff), screenwriter, and rock musician (Morbidi i Mnoći).
- Gunvor Nelson, 93, Swedish filmmaker (Schmeerguntz, My Name Is Oona).
- James Nunnally, 79, American politician, member of the Mississippi House of Representatives (1972–1988).
- Margus Oopkaup, 65, Estonian actor.
- David William Rhind, 81, British geographer.
- Meirion Roberts, 90, Welsh rugby union player (Cardiff, national team).
- Charles M. Roessel, 63, American Navajo photographer, journalist and academic administrator, president of Diné College (since 2017).
- Peter Rogers, 85, Welsh politician, AM (1999–2003).
- Monroe Saffold Jr., 76, American bodybuilder and Baptist minister.
- António Couto dos Santos, 75, Portuguese politician, minister of education (1992–1993).
- Raymond Saw Po Ray, 76, Burmese Roman Catholic prelate, auxiliary bishop of Yangon (1987–1993) and bishop of Mawlamyine (1993–2023).
- Krzysztof Sońta, 56, Polish politician, MP (2007–2011, 2014–2015).
- Héctor Travieso, 81, Cuban-Puerto Rican actor, comedian, and television host (SuperXclusivo), heart failure.
- Jim Wetherington, 87, American politician, mayor of Columbus, Georgia (2007–2011).
- Dale Wilson, 82, Canadian voice actor (Dragon Ball Z, G.I. Joe: A Real American Hero, Martin Mystery), complications from prostate cancer and Parkinson's disease.
- Gary Winkel, 86, American environmental psychologist.
- Robert Paul Wolff, 91, American political philosopher (In Defense of Anarchism, A Critique of Pure Tolerance).
- Yoon Ju-yeong, 96, South Korean politician, MP (1973–1979).
- Ludwik Zalewski, 70, Polish politician, senator (2005–2007).

=== 7 ===
- Ginette Aumassip, 94, French geologist.
- Alfred Bammesberger, 86, German academic.
- Marcel Barouh, 90, French table tennis player.
- Wainikiti Bogidrau, 56, Fijian netball administrator.
- Carolyn Brown, 97, American dancer, choreographer and writer.
- Lucien Cariat, 85, Belgian politician.
- Cheng Yu-cheng, 78, Taiwanese politician, member of the Legislative Yuan (1981–1987, 1990–1993, 2002–2005), heart attack.
- Barbara Clegg, 98, British actress (Emergency Ward 10) and scriptwriter (Doctor Who, Coronation Street).
- Tista De Lorenzo, 90, Australian rules footballer (Richmond).
- Alan Emrich, 65, American writer and game designer.
- Ayla Erduran, 90, Turkish violinist.
- Mervin Guarte, 32, Filipino middle-distance runner, stabbed.
- Rollin Howell, 95, American politician.
- Geraint H. Jenkins, 78, Welsh historian.
- Winnie Khumalo, 51, South African singer and actress.
- Jean-Marie Le Pen, 96, French politician, deputy (1956–1962, 1986–1988) and MEP (1984–2019), founder of National Front.
- Lim Kimya, 73, French-Cambodian politician, MP (2013–2018), shot.
- Abdelkader Ould Makhloufi, 80, Algerian boxer.
- Mirosława Marcheluk, 85, Polish actress (Hero of the Year, Magnat).
- Walter Martos, 67, Peruvian military officer and politician, prime minister (2020) and minister of defence (2019–2020).
- Neal McCaleb, 89, American politician, member of the Oklahoma House of Representatives (1975–1983), assistant secretary of the interior for Indian affairs (2001–2003).
- Bill McMaster, 94, Australian football player and coach (Geelong).
- Jagdish Mittal, 99, Indian art collector.
- Betty C. Monkman, 82, American curator and author, White House curator (1997–2002), leukemia.
- Jiban Mukhopadhyay, 76, Indian politician, West Bengal MLA (2011–2021).
- Petya Pendareva, 53, Bulgarian Olympic sprinter (1996, 2000).
- Woody Pirtle, 81, American artist.
- Deogracias Victor Savellano, 65, Filipino politician, three-time governor of Ilocos Sur, member (2016–2022) and deputy speaker (2019–2022) of the House of Representatives, abdominal aneurysm.
- Leo Segedin, 97, American painter.
- Volker Sklenar, 80, German politician, member of the Landtag of Thuringia (1990–2009).
- Joseph Trần Xuân Tiếu, 80, Vietnamese Roman Catholic prelate, bishop of Long Xuyên (2003–2019).
- Øyvind Vågnes, 52, Norwegian writer and magazine editor, lung fibrosis.
- Felix Wilfred, 76, Indian theologian, heart attack.
- Peter Yarrow, 86, American singer (Peter, Paul and Mary) and songwriter ("Puff, the Magic Dragon"), bladder cancer.

=== 8 ===
- Souheil Ayoub, 90, Lebanese Olympic fencer (1968).
- Floyd E. Bloom, 88, American medical researcher.
- Gabriel de Broglie, 93, French historian, chancellor of the Institut de France (2006–2017) and member of the Académie Française.
- Jorge Cáceres, 77, Argentine-born Colombian footballer (San Martín de Tucumán, América de Cali, Colombia national team).
- Françoise Choay, 99, French architectural and urban historian.
- Juan Carlos Concha, 91, Chilean surgeon and politician, minister of public health (1971–1972).
- Fabio Cudicini, 89, Italian footballer (Udinese, Roma, Milan).
- William P. Dixon, 81, American lawyer and political strategist, U.S. alternate director of the World Bank (1977–1979), manager of the 1980 Democratic National Convention, prostate cancer.
- Rudolf Dreßler, 84, German politician and diplomat, MP (1980–2000).
- Kjell-Olof Feldt, 93, Swedish politician, minister for finance (1983–1990), budget (1982) and commerce and industry (1970–1975).
- Knud Heinesen, 92, Danish politician, minister of finance (twice), public works (1981) and education (1971–1973).
- Selim İleri, 75, Turkish writer, screenwriter, and film critic.
- Lucky Jayawardena, 70, Sri Lankan politician, MP (1994–2004, 2015–2020).
- Gyanada Kakati, 92, Indian actress.
- Charles Kay, 94, British actor (Amadeus, Henry V, The Importance of Being Earnest).
- Kjell Kjær, 82, Norwegian actor (Fleksnes Fataliteter).
- Karsten Klepsvik, 72, Norwegian civil servant and diplomat.
- Jim Lawrence, 85, Canadian baseball player (Cleveland Indians).
- Nancy Leftenant-Colon, 104, American nurse.
- Lyn Lepore, 63, Australian tandem cyclist, Paralympic champion (2000), cancer.
- Lin Cheng-fong, 75, Taiwanese politician, member of the Legislative Yuan (2005–2008) and mayor of Guishan City (1998–2005), complications from amyotrophic lateral sclerosis.
- Charles Longsworth, 95, American academic administrator, president of Hampshire College (1971–1977).
- Alastair MacKinven, 53, British visual artist.
- Pritish Nandy, 73, Indian poet, film producer (Bollywood Calling, The Mystic Masseur), and politician, MP (1998–2004).
- Des O'Grady, 72, Irish Gaelic footballer (St Finbarr's, Cork).
- Charles Person, 82, American civil rights activist (Freedom Rides).
- John C. Peterson, 76, American politician, member of the Kansas House of Representatives (1971–1975).
- José Linhares Ponte, 94, Brazilian politician, deputy (1991–2015).
- Nurul Qomar, 64, Indonesian politician, MP (2004–2014), colon cancer.
- Alma Latif Shamsi, 88, Indian poet and writer.
- Mangkra Souvanna Phouma, 86, Laotian royal.
- Rino Tommasi, 90, Italian journalist, television host, and sport commentator.
- David Vaisey, 89, British librarian, Bodley's librarian (1986–1996).
- Willy Venneman, 85, Belgian Olympic boxer (1960).
- Wu Lusheng, 94, Chinese architect.
- Neil Zurcher, 89, American journalist (WJW-TV) and television host.

=== 9 ===
- Hind Al-Abadleh, 47, Emirati-Canadian chemist.
- Andrzej Marian Bartczak, 79, Polish artist and educator.
- Henry Beissel, 95, Canadian writer and editor.
- Abe Bekker, 89, Zambian Olympic boxer (1960).
- Bimla Bissell, 92, Indian civil servant and businesswoman, co-founder of Fabindia, complications from diabetes.
- Black Bart, 76, American professional wrestler (NWA), colon cancer.
- Bill Byrge, 86, American actor (Ernest Saves Christmas, Ernest Goes to Jail, Ernest Scared Stupid) and comedian.
- Marius Ciugarin, 75, Romanian footballer (Steaua București, FC Brașov, Progresul București).
- Bill Clements, 91, Australian footballer (Richmond).
- Phyllis Dalton, 99, English costume designer (Lawrence of Arabia, Doctor Zhivago, The Princess Bride), Oscar winner (1966, 1990).
- Margaret Baba Diri, 70, Ugandan politician, MP (since 1996).
- Laurie Holloway, 86, English pianist, musical director (Strictly Come Dancing, Parkinson) and composer.
- Rex Holman, 89, American actor (Death Valley Days, The Virginian, Star Trek V: The Final Frontier).
- P. Jayachandran, 80, Indian playback singer.
- Mick Kennedy, 89, Irish hurler (Faughs, Tipperary, Dublin).
- Susan Koehn, 63, American politician, member of the Utah House of Representatives (1995–2000), breast cancer.
- Barbro Larsson, 94, Swedish actress (My Friend Oscar, Time of Desire, Stage Entrance).
- Mukhtar Magauin, 84, Kazakh writer and publicist.
- Marc Michetz, 73, Belgian comic book artist (Kogaratsu).
- Ian Miles, 72, Australian footballer (Richmond).
- Thomas J. Murphy, 94, American politician and jurist, member of the New York State Assembly (1971–1977).
- Alberto Onofre, 77, Mexican footballer (Guadalajara, national team).
- Tom Osthoff, 88, American politician, member of the Minnesota House of Representatives (1983–2003).
- Manuel Elkin Patarroyo, 78, Colombian pathologist and immunologist.
- Irmengard Rauch, 91, American linguist.
- Emrys Roberts, 93, Welsh nationalist activist.
- Mickey Roth, 97, Canadian ice hockey player (Lethbridge Maple Leafs, Stratford Kroehlers, national team), world champion (1951).
- Jorge Luis Sánchez, 64, Cuban film director (El Benny, Buscando a Casal).
- Otto Schenk, 94, Austrian actor (Dunja, Always Trouble with the Reverend), film (Die Fledermaus) and theatre director.
- Shulamith Shahar, 96, Latvian-born Israeli historian.
- Doc Shebeleza, 51, South African kwaito musician.
- Harvard Sitkoff, 85, American historian.
- Muhammad Ssegirinya, 36, Ugandan politician, MP (since 2022).
- John William Thomson, 96, Canadian politician, MP (1979–1984).
- Mariusz Trynkiewicz, 62, Polish serial killer and sex offender.

=== 10 ===
- Christopher Benjamin, 90, English actor (Doctor Who, Judge John Deed, The Plague Dogs).
- Robert K. Brayton, 91, American electrical engineer and mathematician.
- Itzhak Brook, 83–84, Israeli-American physician and medical researcher.
- Frank Cicutto, 74–75, Italian-Australian business executive, CEO of National Australia Bank (1999–2004).
- Yevgenia Dobrovolskaya, 60, Russian actress (Queen Margot, Actress, The Irony of Fate 2), complications from cancer and heart failure.
- Milan Feranec, 60, Czech politician, MP (since 2017), kidney cancer.
- Raimondo Galuppo, 78, Italian politician, senator (1992–1994).
- Horacio González de las Casas, 82, Mexican politician, deputy (1988–1991).
- Wynand Havenga, 59, South African darts player.
- Thelma Hopkins, 88, Northern Irish high jumper, Olympic silver medallist (1956).
- Mike Hynson, 82, American surfer (The Endless Summer).
- Charles E. Jefferson, 79, American politician, member of the Illinois House of Representatives (2001–2014).
- José Jiménez, 76, Puerto Rican political activist, founder of the Young Lords.
- Ted Kilmurray, 90, Australian footballer (East Perth).
- Kim Soo-jin, 85, South Korean mineralogist, discoverer of Janggunite.
- Andrzej Kraśnicki, 75, Polish sport activist.
- Stephan Krasovitsky, 89, Russian poet, translator, and priest.
- Roger Lebranchu, 102, French Olympic rower (1948).
- Sir Charles Lepani, 77, Papua New Guinean diplomat, intestinal cancer.
- Jones P. Madeira, 80, Trinidadian journalist (Trinidad and Tobago Guardian).
- Félix Mantilla, 90, Puerto Rican baseball player (Milwaukee Braves, Boston Red Sox).
- Bill McCartney, 84, American Hall of Fame football coach (Colorado Buffaloes), complications from dementia.
- Sam Moore, 89, American Hall of Fame singer-songwriter (Sam & Dave), complications from surgery.
- Paquita Ors, 96, Spanish pharmacist and cosmetic businesswoman.
- Hayotxon Ortiqboyeva, 78, Uzbek poet and politician, senator (2004–2009).
- Longin Pastusiak, 89, Polish politician and historian.
- Anatoli Pata, 66, Russian football player (Dynamo Stavropol, Kuban Krasnodar) and manager (Dynamo Stavropol).
- Jean-Luc Petitrenaud, 74, French food critic and television host.
- Jacques Poilleux, 87, French doctor and academic, president of the Académie nationale de chirurgie (2009).
- Ângela Ribeiro, 84, Portuguese actress (Retalhos da Vida de Um Médico).
- Hunter Q. Robbins III, 67, American professional wrestling manager (ECW).
- Michel Schetter, 76, Belgian comic book writer.
- Kenneth E. Scott, 96, American politician, member of the Minnesota House of Representatives (1963–1967).
- Shiu Ka-chun, 55, Hong Kong democracy activist, MLC (2016–2020), stomach cancer.
- Nelson Silva Pacheco, 80, Uruguayan-born Colombian footballer (Sportivo Italiano, Tigre, Colombia national team).
- Einar Olav Skogholt, 77, Norwegian politician, MP (1989–2001).
- Reto Stiffler, 84, Swiss businessman, president of Standard Liège (2000–2011).
- Bram Van Paesschen, 45, Belgian film director (Empire of Dust) and editor.
- Winfried Wiencek, 76, German deaf table tennis player and deaf sports official.

=== 11 ===
- Raʼno Abdullayeva, 89, Uzbek historian.
- Beryl Anthony Jr., 86, American lawyer and politician, member of the U.S. House of Representatives (1979–1993).
- Jean-Michel Billaut, 79, French systems analyst and internet personality.
- James Carlos Blake, 81, Mexican-born American author, pneumonia.
- Hans-Joachim Brauske, 81, German Olympic boxer (1972).
- Linda Burnes Bolton, 76, American nurse and healthcare administrator (Cedars-Sinai Medical Center).
- Bill Dailey, 89, American baseball player (Cleveland Indians, Minnesota Twins).
- Marty DeMerritt, 71, American baseball player and coach (San Francisco Giants, Chicago Cubs).
- Keith Dewhurst, 93, English playwright and scriptwriter.
- Kitty Flynn, 98, Irish historian and author.
- Neil French, 60, English cricketer (Lincolnshire).
- Richard Godfrey, 91, American politician, mayor of Normal, Illinois (1976–1985).
- Gurpreet Gogi, 57, Indian politician, Punjab MLA (since 2022), shot.
- Indradasa Hettiarachchi, 97, Sri Lankan politician.
- Rein Jan Hoekstra, 83, Dutch jurist.
- Bobby Kennedy, 87, Scottish football player (Manchester City, Kilmarnock) and manager (Grimsby Town).
- Mario Klemens, 88, Czech conductor (Film Symphony Orchestra) and educator of conducting.
- Merle Louise, 90, American actress (Sweeney Todd: The Demon Barber of Fleet Street, Into the Woods, Gypsy).
- Nicholas Maxwell, 87, British philosopher.
- James McEachin, 94, American actor (Tenafly, Fuzz, The Groundstar Conspiracy) and author.
- Peter J. Messitte, 83, American jurist, judge of the U.S. District Court for Maryland (since 1993).
- Joel Paley, 69, American theatre director, lyricist and playwright (Ruthless!).
- Zora Palová, 77, Slovak glass artist.
- Donald Pelmear, 100, British actor (Doctor Who, The Citadel, Elizabeth).
- Qiu Dahong, 94, Chinese coastal and offshore engineer, member of the Chinese Academy of Sciences.
- Dominique Robert, 72, French politician, deputy (1991–1993).
- Tiny Ruys, 67, Dutch football player and manager (Fortuna Sittard, MVV Maastricht, United Arab Emirates national team).
- Barbara Rylska, 88, Polish actress.
- Fereydoon Shahbazyan, 82, Iranian composer and conductor, respiratory disease.
- Rasna Warah, 63, Kenyan writer.

=== 12 ===
- Reinhard Anders, 84, German politician, member of the Volkskammer (1990).
- Peter Brown, 83, Scottish rugby union player (Glasgow, national team).
- Leslie Charleson, 79, American actress (General Hospital, Love Is a Many Splendored Thing, The Day of the Dolphin).
- Witold Dąbrowski, 92, Polish politician, voivode of Siedlce (1975–1977).
- Robert B. Daroff, 88, American neurologist.
- Gary T. Dilweg, 88, American politician, member of the Wisconsin State Assembly (1979–1983).
- Jackie Farry, 58, American music manager and television host (Superock), lung disease.
- Arnold Frolows, 74, Australian radio personality, pancreatic and liver cancer.
- Monireh Gorji, 95–96, Iranian teacher and mujtahid, member of the Assembly for the Final Review of the Constitution (1979).
- Hasjim Djalal, 90, Indonesian diplomat.
- Malcolm Jones Howard, 85, American jurist, judge of the U.S. District Court for Eastern North Carolina (since 1988).
- Mark Izu, 70, American jazz double bass player and composer, colon cancer.
- Manda Jagannath, 73, Indian politician, MP (1998–2014).
- Claude Jarman Jr., 90, American actor (The Yearling, Intruder in the Dust, Rio Grande).
- Ruth G. King, 91, American psychologist and educator.
- Wulf Traugott Kruse, 88, German politician, member of the Bürgerschaft of Bremen (1975–1976).
- Robert Machray, 79, American actor (Cheers, Thanks, Rapsittie Street Kids: Believe in Santa).
- Bernard McIntyre, 82, American politician, member of the Oklahoma House of Representatives (1971–1982) and Senate (1982–1986).
- Jeffrey A. Meyer, 61, American jurist, judge of the U.S. District Court for the District of Connecticut (since 2014).
- Masahiro Mori, 97, Japanese roboticist.
- Leslie M. Palm, 80, American major general.
- Darryl Pearce, 64, Australian basketball player (Adelaide 36ers).
- Jan Randles, 79, Australian long-distance runner, Paralympic champion (1984).
- Emmanuel Rashba, 97, Soviet-American physicist.
- Keith Rayner, 95, Australian Anglican prelate, primate of Australia (1991–1999).
- Isaías Rodríguez, 82, Venezuelan lawyer and politician, vice president (2000) and prosecutor general (2000–2007).
- José María Sanz Pastor, 83, Spanish diplomat and politician, civil governor of province of Seville (1980–1982).
- Bob Sercombe, 75, Australian politician, MP (1996–2007).
- Stuart Spencer, 97, American political strategist.
- Lynne Taylor-Corbett, 78, American choreographer (Footloose, Swing!, Titanic).
- Diane Thome, 82, American composer.
- Thomas Timusk, 91, Estonian-born Canadian physicist and academic.
- Kim Yaroshevskaya, 101, Russian-born Canadian actress (Fanfreluche, Passe-Partout, Home Fires).

=== 13 ===
- Eliseo Alcon, 74, American politician, member of the New Mexico House of Representatives (2009–2024), liver cancer.
- Chris Barnard, 77, Welsh footballer (Torquay United, Ipswich Town, Southend United).
- Niel Barnard, 75, South African intelligence chief, director-general of the National Intelligence Service (1979–1992), cancer.
- Paul Benacerraf, 94, French-American philosopher (Benacerraf's identification problem).
- Alicja Bobrowska, 89, Polish actress, television presenter and artist, Miss Polonia (1957).
- Tony Book, 90, English football player (Bath City, Manchester City) and manager (Manchester City).
- C. Marshall Cain, 90, American lawyer and politician, member of the South Carolina House of Representatives (1969–1975, 1979–1981).
- Mariama Camara, 66, Guinean politician and businesswoman.
- Pat Caplice, 97, Australian jazz musician.
- Ricardo Chapa, 76, Mexican Olympic water polo player (1972).
- Bernd Cullmann, 85, German sprinter, Olympic champion (1960).
- Quentin Davies, Baron Davies of Stamford, 80, British politician, MP (1987–2010) and member of the House of Lords (2010–2023).
- Walter Deutsch, 101, Austrian musicologist.
- Carol Downer, 91, American feminist lawyer and author, complications from a heart attack.
- Nathalie Dupree, 85, American cookbook writer and television personality.
- John Evans, 74, British disability rights activist, cancer.
- Mary Fennelly, 76, Irish camogie player.
- Tony Gresham, 84, Australian golfer, amateur champion (1977).
- Keith Griffith, 77, Barbadian football player (national team) and manager (national team, U.S. Virgin Islands national team).
- Elgar Howarth, 89, English conductor, composer and trumpeter.
- Shamsaddin Khanbabayev, 85, Azerbaijani politician, prime minister of the Nakhchivan Autonomous Republic (1993–2000).
- Charles Kleiber, 82, Swiss government official, state secretary for education (1997–2007).
- Peter Kolchin, 81, American historian.
- Bob Lane, 97, Canadian politician, MP (1979).
- Fernanda Maria, 87, Portuguese fado singer.
- Jean Penders, 85, Dutch politician, MEP (1979–1994).
- Franco Piperno, 82, Italian physicist and political activist, co-founder of Potere Operaio.
- Palavalasa Rajasekharam, 80, Indian politician, Andhra Pradesh MLA (1976–1982, 1994–1999).
- Clark L. Reber, 87, American politician, member of the Utah House of Representatives (1983–1987, 1993–1995).
- Henry Rey, 86, Monegasque sporting director and politician, president of AS Monaco FC (1970–1972), MP (1968–2008).
- Neomia Rogers, 84, American Olympic high jumper (1960).
- Abdul Sathar Kunju, 85, Indian police officier.
- Rolf Schweiger, 80, Swiss politician, member of the Council of States (1999–2011).
- André Sollie, 77, Belgian author and illustrator.
- Mykhaylo Stelmakh, 58, Ukrainian football player (Dynamo Kyiv, Shakhtar Donetsk) and manager (Kharkiv).
- Hilpas Sulin, 90, Finnish ice hockey player and coach (HPK).
- Kjell Svindland, 91, Norwegian politician, county mayor of Vest-Agder (1995–1999).
- Oliviero Toscani, 82, Italian photographer, complications from amyloidosis.
- Vicente Vega, 69, Venezuelan footballer (Deportivo Italia Caracas, Portuguesa Acarigua, national team), complications from diabetes.
- Archie Wade, 85, American baseball player (St. Louis Cardinals, St. Petersburg Saints) and academic.
- Edward Zuccaro, 81, American politician, member of the Vermont House of Representatives (1981–1989), prostate cancer.

=== 14 ===
- Nello Altomare, 61, Canadian politician, member of the Legislative Assembly of Manitoba (since 2019) and minister of education and early childhood learning of Manitoba (since 2023), Hodgkin lymphoma.
- Rubén Ardila, 82, Colombian psychologist.
- Nasser Biria, 65, Iranian Shi'a cleric.
- John Blakemore, 88, English photographer.
- Arthur Blessitt, 84, American Christian preacher.
- Chen Ching-Po, 93, Taiwanese golfer, sepsis.
- Furio Colombo, 94, Italian journalist (L'Unità) and politician, deputy (1996–2001, 2008–2013) and senator (2006–2008).
- Judith Cowan, 81, Canadian academic, translator, and writer.
- Irmgard Furchner, 99, German concentration camp secretary (Stutthof concentration camp).
- Brian Gibbons, 77, Canadian ice hockey player (Ottawa Nationals, Toronto Toros, Denver Spurs).
- Kjell Gjerseth, 78, Norwegian novelist and journalist.
- Pat Goggin, 84, Irish footballer (Tramore Athletic, Cork Hibernians).
- Jürgen Graf, 73, Swiss author, translator, and historical negationist.
- Ishak Haleva, 84, Turkish rabbi, Hakham Bashi (since 2002). (death announced on this date)
- Marc Hollogne, 63, Belgian actor, stage director, and film director (Chance or Coincidence, The Claim).
- Ladislav Hučko, 76, Slovak Ruthenian Greek Catholic hierarch, apostolic exarch of the Czech Republic (since 2003).
- Michał Janiszewski, 70, Polish politician, MP (1991–1993, 1997–2001).
- Tom Jones, 77, American politician, member of the Kentucky House of Representatives (1981–1991), heart attack.
- Surat Singh Khalsa, 91, Indian-American political activist.
- Heinz Kluetmeier, 82, German-born American sports photographer (Sports Illustrated).
- Lars Kvant, 69, Swedish squash player.
- Benedito de Lira, 82, Brazilian politician, MP (1995–1999, 2003–2019) and mayor of Barra de São Miguel (since 2021), cancer.
- Jay Mazur, 92, American labor leader, heart failure.
- Thomas McHugh, 88, American jurist, justice of the Supreme Court of Appeals of West Virginia (1981–1997, 2009–2013).
- Michel Medinger, 83, Luxembourgish photographer and Olympic middle-distance runner (1964).
- Khadija Mushtaq, 50, Pakistani academic administrator.
- Teddy Osei, 87, Ghanaian jazz saxophonist (Osibisa).
- Hans Reichelt, 99, German politician, member of the Volkskammer (1950–1990).
- Thomas P. Salmon, 92, American politician, governor of Vermont (1973–1977).
- Tony Slattery, 65, British actor (The Crying Game, Peter's Friends), comedian and television personality (Whose Line Is It Anyway?), heart attack.
- Hans Stenberg-Nilsen, 94, Norwegian jurist.
- Judy Thongori, 60, Kenyan lawyer and women's rights activist.
- Simon Townsend, 79, Australian television presenter (Simon Townsend's Wonder World, TVTV), cancer.
- Gwen Watkins, 101, British codebreaker and author.
- Graham Whyte, 72, Australian cricketer (Queensland). (death announced on this date)

=== 15 ===
- Anna Maria Ackermann, 92, Italian actress (Le inchieste del commissario Maigret, The Skin, 'O Re).
- Stephanie Aeffner, 48, German politician, MP (since 2021).
- Ursula Bowyer, 99, German-born British architect.
- Tommy Brown, 97, American baseball player (Brooklyn Dodgers, Philadelphia Phillies, Chicago Cubs), pneumonia.
- Subhagata Choudhury, 78, Bangladeshi non-fiction writer, cancer.
- Paul Danan, 46, English actor (Hollyoaks, Celebrity Love Island), mixed drug intoxication.
- Alejandra Darín, 62, Argentine actress (Rincón de Luz, Alguien que me quiera) and labor leader.
- Tommy Dix, 101, American baritone singer and actor (Best Foot Forward).
- Aldo Dorigo, 95, Italian footballer (Triestina, Internazionale, Alessandria).
- David W. Duclon, 74, American television writer and producer (Punky Brewster, Silver Spoons, Family Matters).
- David Goodall, 83, British chemist.
- Michael Hames, 79, British police officer.
- M. Azizul Haq, 84, Bangladeshi police officer, inspector general (1996–1997).
- Jack Hoffman, 19, American football player and cancer research advocate, glioma.
- Sylvan Kalib, 95, American music theorist and composer.
- Semyon Kutateladze, 79, Russian mathematician.
- Diane Langton, 80, English actress (Hollyoaks, Only Fools and Horses, EastEnders).
- Li Kuei-hsien, 87, Taiwanese poet.
- Patricia Lyfoung, 47, French cartoonist.
- Melba Montgomery, 86, American country singer ("No Charge", "Don't Let the Good Times Fool You", "Angel of the Morning") and songwriter.
- Philippe Moreau Defarges, 81, French political scientist.
- Ebrahim Nabavi, 66, Iranian satirist, writer and diarist, suicide.
- Jafar Masood Hasani Nadwi, 59, Indian scholar, traffic collision.
- Vsevolod Nemolyaev, 87, Russian ballet dancer and director of the Bolshoi Theatre.
- Linda Nolan, 65, Irish singer (The Nolans), actress and television personality (Celebrity Big Brother), double pneumonia.
- Adewunmi Onanuga, 59, Nigerian politician, MP (since 2019).
- Turtel Onli, 72, American artist.
- Sudip Pandey, 30, Indian actor, heart attack.
- Richard Russell, 79, Jamaican tennis player, pneumonia.
- Syed Muhammad Asghar Shah, 75, Pakistani politician, MNA (2013–2018).
- Doug Shapiro, 65, American racing cyclist.
- Manjul Sinha, Indian television director (Yeh Jo Hai Zindagi, Yeh Hai Mumbai Meri Jaan), heart attack.
- Rosny Smarth, 84, Haitian politician, prime minister (1996–1997).
- P. R. Sundaram, 73, Indian politician, Tamil Nadu MLA (1996–2006) and MP (2014–2019).
- Jeannot Szwarc, 85, French film director (Jaws 2, Supergirl, Somewhere in Time), respiratory failure.
- Raymond Thompson, 75, British-born Canadian-New Zealand screenwriter, composer and producer.
- Norman Tolman, 88, American art collector and dealer.
- Sarigama Viji, 76, Indian actor (Beluvalada Madilalli, Mana Mecchida Sose, Yamalokadalli Veerappan).
- Joe Vosoba, 95, American politician, member of the Nebraska Legislature (1959–1963).
- Gus Williams, 71, American basketball player (Golden State Warriors, Seattle SuperSonics, Washington Bullets), NBA champion (1979), complications from a stroke.

=== 16 ===
- Chuck Alm, 87, American Olympic rower (1960).
- Vasile Ardeleanu, 50, Romanian footballer (FCM Bacău, Focșani, Dinamo Onești).
- Uwe Beginski, 65, German footballer (Darmstadt 98, VfL Osnabrück, KSV Hessen Kassel).
- Harry Bild, 88, Swedish footballer (IFK Norrköping, Östers IF, national team), cancer.
- Sabah Bizi, 78, Albanian footballer (Vllaznia Shkodër, Partizani Tirana, national team).
- Roger Breslin, 87, American attorney.
- Geneviève Callerot, 108, French novelist and resistance fighter.
- Giovanni Cavagna, 90, Italian physiologist and academician.
- Luís Cechinel, 80, Brazilian politician, deputy (1979–1983).
- Chenhamo Chimutengwende, 81, Zimbabwean politician, MP (1985–2008).
- Robert Corell, 90, American climatologist.
- Jack De Mave, 91, American actor (Lassie, The Man Without a Face, Days of Our Lives).
- Abdoulaye Diabaté, 65, Senegalese pianist (Kora Jazz Trio).
- Hans Dobida, 95, Austrian ice hockey administrator, president of the Austrian Ice Hockey Association (1977–1996).
- Miguel de la Espriella, 77, Colombian painter and sculptor.
- Roland Freihoff, 93, German Olympic rower (1952).
- Gu Gu, 25, Chinese giant panda, heart and liver failure.
- Jack Guittet, 95, French fencer, president of the French Fencing Federation (1977–1981) and Olympic bronze medallist (1964).
- D. G. Hessayon, 96, British author and botanist.
- Hsieh Shih-chien, 72, Taiwanese airline executive, president (since 2016) and chairman (since 2019) of China Airlines, heart attack.
- Huang Lin-kai, 32, Taiwanese double murderer and rapist, execution by shooting.
- Howard Andrew Jones, 56, American author and editor, brain cancer.
- George Kalinsky, 88, American photographer (Madison Square Garden, New York Mets).
- Yusuf Kırkpınar, 75, Turkish politician, MP (1999–2002).
- Dave Lucas, 92, Canadian ice hockey player (Detroit Red Wings).
- David Lynch, 78, American film director (Blue Velvet, Mulholland Drive) and television producer (Twin Peaks), cardiac arrest.
- Colin MacNeil, 88, Australian footballer (Fitzroy).
- František Makeš, 93, Czechoslovak-born Swedish artist.
- Federico Manca, 55, Italian chess player, complications from a heart attack.
- Paul Mango, 65, American healthcare executive and government official.
- Toby Myers, 75, American musician (Roadmaster, John Cougar Mellencamp), cancer.
- Jesús Pérez Varela, 75, Spanish journalist and politician, minister of culture and social communication of Galicia (1997–2005) and member of the Galician parliament (1997).
- Dame Joan Plowright, 95, English actress (Enchanted April, A Taste of Honey, 101 Dalmatians), Tony winner (1961).
- Timothy Plumptre, 81, Canadian author.
- Francisco San Martín, 39, American actor (Days of Our Lives, The Bold and the Beautiful, Jane the Virgin), suicide by hanging.
- Margarita Shtarkelova, 73, Bulgarian basketball player, Olympic bronze medallist (1976).
- George A. Tice, 86, American photographer.
- Bob Uecker, 90, American baseball player (St. Louis Cardinals), broadcaster (Milwaukee Brewers), and actor (Mr. Belvedere), lung cancer.
- Shoji Ueda, 87, Japanese cinematographer (Ran, Dreams, After the Rain), heart attack.
- Dmitry Volkov, 58, Russian swimmer, Olympic silver (1992) and double bronze medallist (1988), cancer.
- Wolfgang Wesemann, 75, German Olympic cyclist (1972).
- Ridley Wills II, 90, American author and historian.
- Kenny Wilson, 78, English footballer (Dumbarton, Carlisle United, St Johnstone).
- Alexey Zlobin, 89, Russian priest and politician, deputy (1990–1993).

=== 17 ===
- Hansjörg Aemisegger, 72, Swiss Olympic racing cyclist (1976).
- Zulfiqar Ali Atre, 61, Pakistani singer and composer, heart attack.
- William Cox, 103, American Episcopalian bishop.
- John J. Deely, 92, American-born New Zealand statistician.
- Étienne, 72, French sculptor.
- Martin Fallon, 55, Irish Gaelic footballer (Strokestown, Roscommon).
- Jules Feiffer, 95, American cartoonist, playwright (Knock Knock), and screenwriter (Popeye, Munro), Pulitzer Prize winner (1986), heart failure.
- Alphonza Gadsden, 79, American Anglican bishop.
- Didier Guillaume, 65, French politician, senator (2008–2018), minister of agriculture and food (2018–2020), and state minister of Monaco (since 2024).
- Richard G. Kopf, 78, American jurist, judge of the U.S. District Court for Nebraska (since 1992).
- Amy Lau, 58, American interior designer, cancer.
- Denis Law, 84, Scottish footballer (Manchester United, Huddersfield Town, national team), complications from Alzheimer's disease.
- Don McCall, 80, American football player (New Orleans Saints, Pittsburgh Steelers).
- Sir Paul Nicholson, 86, English industrialist (Vaux Breweries).
- Punsalmaagiin Ochirbat, 82, Mongolian jurist and politician, president (1990–1997), chairman of the Presidium of the People's Great Khural (1990), and judge of the Constitutional Court (since 2005).
- Shiva Pasupati, 96, Sri Lankan lawyer, attorney general (1975–1988) and solicitor general (1974–1975).
- K. N. Chandrasekharan Pillai, 81, Indian legal scholar.
- Doreen Plews, 94, British fencer.
- Martin Pollack, 80, Austrian journalist and author.
- François Ponchaud, 85, French Catholic priest and missionary.
- Robert Powell, 92, American composer.
- Don Rees, 87, Welsh mathematician.
- David Schneiderman, 77, American newspaper editor (The Village Voice), pneumonia.
- Kulanthai Shanmugalingam, 93, Sri Lankan playwright.
- Jan Shepard, 96, American actress (King Creole, Attack of the Giant Leeches, Paradise, Hawaiian Style), pneumonia.
- M. Srinivas, 82, Indian politician, MP (1998–1999) and three-time Karnataka MLA.
- Martin Truex Sr., 66, American racing driver (NASCAR Busch North Series).
- Stéphane Venne, 83, Canadian singer-songwriter, arranger and producer.
- Robert Verrall, 97, Canadian animator (Cosmic Zoom, Hot Stuff, The Romance of Transportation in Canada).
- Christine Wischer, 80, German politician, member of the Bürgerschaft of Bremen (1987–1995), member of the Senate of Bremen (1995–2003).
- Susan F. Wood, 66, American public health professional, glioblastoma.
- Maria Zaitseva, 24, Belarusian military volunteer (2nd International Legion).

=== 18 ===
- Dave Bargeron, 82, American trombonist and tuba player (Blood, Sweat & Tears).
- Bill Belden, 76, American Olympic rower (1976).
- Garry Brooke, 64, English footballer (Tottenham Hotspur, Groningen, Norwich City).
- Jérôme Chevallier, 50, French cyclist.
- Riccardo Chieppa, 98, Italian magistrate, member (1995–2004) and president (2002–2004) of the constitutional court.
- Don Cupitt, 90, English philosopher.
- Aaron De Groft, 59, American art museum director (Orlando Museum of Art).
- Jennifer Dickson, 88, South African-born British-Canadian artist and printmaker.
- Boyko Dimitrov, 83, Bulgarian politician, minister of foreign affairs (1989–1990), member of the Grand National Assembly (1990–1991).
- Charles A. Doswell III, 79, American meteorologist.
- Anatolii Frantsuz, 70, Ukrainian politician, governor of Volyn Oblast (2002–2005).
- Evaldo Gonçalves, 91, Brazilian politician, deputy (1987–1995).
- Abdul Karim Hanggi, 82, Indonesian politician, member of the House of Representatives (1997–1999), regent of Buol (2000–2007).
- Richard J. Howrigan, 91, American politician, member of the Vermont House of Representatives (1995–2013).
- Lorenzo Infantino, 77, Italian philosopher and sociologist.
- T. M. Jayamurugan, Indian film director (Roja Malare, Adada Enna Azhagu, Thee Ivan), heart attack.
- Bruce Kannemeyer, 60, South African politician and convicted embezzler, MNA (1999–2004), cancer.
- N. Kayisii, 58, Indian politician, Manipur MLA (since 2017), cancer.
- Don Kinnamon, 87, American politician, member of the Oklahoma House of Representatives (1989–2001).
- Sir John Lapli, 69, Solomon Island politician, governor-general (1999–2004).
- Ester Larsen, 88, Danish politician, MP (1994–2005) and minister of health (1989–1993).
- Joseph Lazare, 40, Canadian Mohawk director, producer, and actor (By the Rapids).
- Russell Marshall, 88, New Zealand politician, MP (1972–1990), minister of foreign affairs (1987–1990) and education (1984–1987).
- Jerry Mazzanti, 84, American football player (Pittsburgh Steelers, Philadelphia Eagles, Detroit Lions).
- Mike Miller, 71, American guitarist (Air Pocket, Chick Corea, Bette Midler), heart attack.
- Mohammad Moghiseh, 68, Iranian judge, justice of the Supreme Court (since 2020), shot.
- Jan Mycielski, 92, Polish-American mathematician (Ehrenfeucht–Mycielski sequence, Mycielskian).
- Geoff Nicholson, 71, British novelist.
- Nicolae Oaidă, 91, Romanian football player (Progresul București, national team) and manager (Tractorul Brașov).
- Denis Pirie, 85, British far right activist.
- K. R. Punia, 89, Indian politician, Haryana MLA (1987–1989), heart attack.
- Paul Rader, 90, American religious leader, General of The Salvation Army (1994–1999).
- Ali Razini, 71, Iranian judge and politician, justice of the Supreme Court (since 2016) and member of the Assembly of Experts (2007–2016), shot.
- Ze'ev Revach, 84, Israeli actor (Charlie Ve'hetzi, Hagiga B'Snuker, The Farewell Party) and comedian.
- André Soltner, 92, French-American chef, restaurateur (Lutèce), and author.
- Richard A. Stratton, 93, American naval aviator and commander (Vietnam War).
- Herschel Turner, 82, American football player (Kentucky Wildcats, St. Louis Cardinals).
- Mirko Valentić, 92, Croatian historian.
- Claire van Kampen, 71, English composer (Royal Shakespeare Company), playwright and theatre director, cancer.
- Eliška Wagnerová, 76, Czech judge and politician, president of the Supreme Court (1998–2002), vice president of the Constitutional Court (2002–2012) and senator (2012–2018).
- Eric Widmer, 85, American scholar and historian.

=== 19 ===
- Carlos Arellano Lennox, 96, Panamanian marine biologist, nationalist leader and politician, president of the National Assembly (1990).
- Léo Batista, 92, Brazilian journalist and television presenter.
- Bavê Teyar, 63–64, Syrian actor, drone strike.
- Lázaro Aristides Betancourt, 88, Cuban Olympic hurdler (1964). (death announced on this date)
- Marcel Bonin, 93, Canadian ice hockey player (Detroit Red Wings, Boston Bruins, Montreal Canadiens), four-time Stanley Cup champion.
- Francis Borkowski, 88, American academic and university administrator.
- Anna Bruns, 87, German politician, member of the Hamburg Parliament (1991–1998).
- Jimmy Calderwood, 69, Scottish football player (Birmingham City) and manager (Dunfermline Athletic, Aberdeen), complications from dementia.
- William P. Castelli, 93, American physician and epidemiologist.
- George Faulkner, 91, Canadian ice hockey player (Shawinigan-Falls Cataracts, Jacksonville Rockets).
- Christopher Fifield, 79, English conductor and music historian, complications from dementia.
- Ralf-Dieter Fischer, 76, German politician, member of the Hamburg Parliament (1982–1997).
- K. K. Gangadharan, 75, Indian translator.
- Matthew Gergely, 45, American politician, member of the Pennsylvania House of Representatives (since 2023).
- Kaiti Grey, 100, Greek singer.
- Doreen Hall, 103, Canadian violinist and music educator.
- Leila Hayes, 85, Australian actress (Sons and Daughters, Division 4).
- Vilhelm Helander, 83, Finnish architect and academic.
- Victor Ivan, 75, Sri Lankan journalist (Ravaya).
- Horst Janson, 89, German actor (Captain Kronos – Vampire Hunter, Murphy's War, Shout at the Devil), complications from a stroke.
- Eva Klein, 99, Hungarian-Swedish scientist.
- Géza Kralován, 78, Hungarian sprint canoer, world champion (1973).
- Márcia Lage, 64, Brazilian carnival designer (Acadêmicos do Salgueiro, Mocidade Independente de Padre Miguel), leukemia.
- Brian A. Larkins, 78, American molecular biologist.
- Lobo, 69, Dutch singer.
- Jalal Matini, 96, Iranian writer.
- Tom McVie, 89, Canadian ice hockey coach (Washington Capitals, Winnipeg Jets, New Jersey Devils).
- Pierre Mertens, 85, Belgian writer and lawyer.
- Jan Mijnsbergen, 86, Dutch politician, senator (1981–1983, 1990–1991).
- Mohamad Hamsan Awang Supain, 65, Malaysian politician, Sabah State MLA (since 2020), kidney failure.
- Robert Donald Munro, 82, Canadian policy advisor.
- Bob Perkins, 91, American disc jockey (WRTI, WCHD) and columnist (The Philadelphia Tribune).
- Maruxa Pita, 94, Spanish missionary.
- Joyce Piven, 94, American actress and director.
- Charles Schodowski, 90, American entertainer and television presenter (Big Chuck and Lil' John).
- Kalilou Singhateh, 90, Gambian politician, MP (1962–1977).
- Jeff Torborg, 83, American baseball player (Los Angeles Dodgers, California Angels) and manager (Chicago White Sox), World Series champion (1965).
- Thijs Udo, 70, Dutch politician, MP (1998–2002).
- Andy van der Watt, 78, South African rugby player (Western Province, national team).
- Bobby Wuensch, 77, American football player.

=== 20 ===
- Michael Angelucci, 42, American politician, member of the West Virginia House of Delegates (2018–2020).
- Lynn Ban, 51, Singaporean-born American jewelry designer, complications following brain surgery.
- Bertrand Blier, 85, French film director (Get Out Your Handkerchiefs, Beau Pere, Buffet froid).
- Edward L. Bowen, 82, American horse racing historian and author.
- Tommy Brasher, 84, American football coach (Philadelphia Eagles, Seattle Seahawks, Kansas City Chiefs).
- Bobby Cuellar, 72, American baseball player (Texas Rangers), heart attack.
- John Freedman, 89, Australian rugby union player (national team) and sailor.
- Dave Gallagher, 73, American football player (New York Giants, Detroit Lions, Chicago Bears) and orthopedic surgeon.
- Franco Giustinelli, 84, Italian politician, senator (1983–1992).
- Peter Grant, English radio and television presenter, cancer. (death announced on this date)
- Shirley Hankins, 93, American politician, member of the Washington House of Representatives (1981–1990, 1995–2009) and Senate (1990).
- Reiko Hayama, 91, Japanese architect.
- Richard Hipa, 67, Niuean politician, MP (2020–2023).
- Willard Ikola, 92, American ice hockey player and coach (Edina High School), Olympic silver medallist (1956).
- Pete Johnson, 76, American politician, state auditor of Mississippi (1988–1992).
- Asma Khatun, 90, Bangladeshi politician, MP (1991–1995).
- Vitaliy Khyzhniak, 90, Ukrainian politician, MP (1990–1994).
- Bob Kuban, 84, American bandleader and musician ("The Cheater"), stroke.
- Francis C. Lapointe, 86, American politician, member of the Massachusetts House of Representatives (1969–1979).
- Shamsheer Singh Manhas, 65, Indian politician, MP (2015–2021).
- Basil Abdelrahman Hassan Nasser, 58, Palestinian politician, complications from surgery.
- Fred Newhouse, 76, American sprinter, Olympic champion (1976).
- Harald Paalgard, 74, Norwegian cinematographer (Orion's Belt, Dreamplay, The Woman That Dreamed About a Man).
- Charles Phan, 62, American chef.
- Antoni Reig Ventura, 92, Spanish Valencian pilota player. (death announced on this date)
- Hanne Reintoft, 90, Danish politician, MP (1966–1971, 1973–1976).
- Cecile Richards, 67, American feminist activist, president of Planned Parenthood (2006–2018), brain cancer.
- Romano Rizzato, 88, Italian painter and illustrator.
- Ginny Ruffner, 72, American glass artist.
- Gernot Rumpf, 83, German sculptor.
- Heinrich W. Schwab, 86, German musicologist.
- Mimi El-Sherbini, 86, Egyptian football player (Al-Ahly, national team) and manager (Al-Nasr). (death announced on this date)
- Hans Simon, 77, German Olympic water polo player (1972, 1976).
- Adam Steinhardt, 55, Australian pole vaulter, bowel cancer.
- Laurens Tan, 74, Australian artist.
- Reinhard Todt, 75, Austrian politician, member (2001–2018) and president (2013, 2018) of the Federal Council.
- William Nyallau Badak, 73, Malaysian politician and judge, MP (2008–2018).

=== 21 ===
- Valérie André, 102, French neurosurgeon, aviator and army general.
- Tore Austad, 89, Norwegian politician, MP (1977–1989), minister of education and church affairs (1981–1983).
- Jo Baer, 95, American painter.
- Luca Beatrice, 63, Italian art critic, heart attack.
- J. Bruce Beckwith, 91, American pathologist.
- Tony Bellus, 88, American singer.
- Håkon Bleken, 96, Norwegian painter.
- Robbie Bonham, 53, Irish comedian.
- Chalpathi, 60, Indian Maoist militant, shot.
- Robert Choe, 85, Malaysian footballer (Malacca, national team).
- Dennis Crompton, 89, English architect.
- Mauricio Funes, 65, Salvadoran politician and convicted criminal, president (2009–2014), complications from a heart attack.
- Gao Zhentong, 96, Chinese structural fatigue scientist.
- Ken Good, 83, English Anglican priest, archdeacon of Richmond and Craven (1993–2006).
- Mohammed Ali Hammadi, 60, Lebanese plane hijacker (TWA Flight 847), shot.
- Petr Hannig, 79, Czech singer and political activist.
- Urs Hochstrasser, 99, Swiss mathematician and physicist.
- Garth Hudson, 87, Canadian Hall of Fame musician (The Band) and keyboardist ("Chest Fever").
- Elliot Ingber, 83, American guitarist (The Mothers of Invention, Fraternity of Man, The Magic Band).
- Faizul Islam, 61, Bangladeshi writer and administrator.
- Renina Katz, 99, Brazilian engraver.
- Jüri Martin, 84, Estonian biologist and politician, MP (1999–2003).
- Howard J. Morrison, 92, American game designer (Simon).
- Abdul Salam Al-Mukhaini, 36, Omani footballer (Al-Oruba, Al-Raed, national team).
- Kaajee Singh, 80, Indian percussionist.
- Doug Sneyd, 93, Canadian cartoonist (Playboy).
- Sir Murray Stuart-Smith, 97, British jurist, lord justice of appeal (1987–2000).
- Keiichi Suzuki, 82, Japanese Olympic speed skater (1964, 1968, 1972), kidney failure.
- Ron Travisano, 86, American advertising executive, complications from a stroke.
- Ian Vermaak, 91, South African tennis player.

=== 22 ===
- Daniel Abugattás, 69, Peruvian politician, member (2006–2016) and president (2011–2012) of Congress.
- Addison Bain, 89, American NASA scientist.
- George Bealer, 80–81, American philosopher. (death announced on this date)
- Richard A. Bettis, 77, American business theorist.
- Keith Brookman, Baron Brookman, 87, British trade unionist and life peer, member of the House of Lords (1998–2020).
- David Bulfield, 87, English cricketer (Dorset).
- Zoé Chatzidakis, 69, French mathematician and researcher.
- Paddy Cole, 85, Irish saxophonist, lung cancer.
- Colonel DeBeers, 80, American professional wrestler (AWA).
- Barry Michael Cooper, 66, American screenwriter (New Jack City, Sugar Hill, Above the Rim).
- John Dineen, 89, Australian footballer (Hawthorn).
- Nicholas Eadie, 67, Australian actor (Vietnam, Fragments of War: The Story of Damien Parer, Cop Shop).
- Loretta Ford, 104, American nurse, dean of the University of Rochester School of Nursing (1972–1985) and co-founder of the first nurse practitioner graduate program.
- Gallo Blue Chip, 28, American racehorse.
- Roberto Giusti, 71, Venezuelan journalist (El Nacional, El Universal).
- Barry Goldberg, 83, American blues musician (The Electric Flag).
- Carey Harrison, 80, British novelist and dramatist (The Jensen Code, Freud).
- Neil Hensrud, 84, American politician, member of the North Dakota House of Representatives (1974–1976).
- Joe John, 85, American politician and jurist, member of the North Carolina House of Representatives (2017–2025) and judge of the North Carolina Court of Appeals (1992–2000), cancer.
- Calvin Jones, 54, American football player (Nebraska Cornhuskers, Oakland Raiders), carbon monoxide poisoning.
- Jean-François Kahn, 86, French journalist, founder of Marianne.
- Lester D. Langley, 84, American historian.
- Li Jinmin, 98, Chinese military officer, political commissar of the PLA Beijing Garrison (1985–1990).
- Michael Longley, 85, Northern Irish poet (The Weather in Japan), complications from surgery.
- Francesco Paolo Lucchese, 90, Italian politician, deputy (1994–2013).
- David Martin, 93, American politician, member of the Wisconsin State Assembly (1961–1971).
- Tabish Mehdi, 73, Indian poet.
- John Moore, 88, Australian politician, minister for defence (1998–2001), member of the House of Representatives (1975–2001).
- Cornel Oțelea, 84, Romanian handball player, world champion (1961, 1964, 1970).
- Volodymyr Pylypchuk, 76, Ukrainian economist and politician, MP (1990–1998).
- Pierre Rabischong, 92, French neuroanatomist and academic.
- Charlotte Raven, 55, British author and journalist (Modern Review), complications from Huntington's disease.
- Juan Antonio Román, 82, Spanish football player (Granada, Real Valladolid) and manager (Linense).
- Johan Slager, 78, Dutch guitarist (Kayak).
- Adrian Snodgrass, 93, Australian architect and scholar.
- Jim Tauber, 74, American film producer (Stand Up Guys, The Place Beyond the Pines, The Age of Adaline), complications from multiple myeloma.
- Kimmo Tauriainen, 52, Finnish footballer (Atlantis, MyPa, RoPS), lymphoma.
- Vasco Joaquim Rocha Vieira, 85, Portuguese military officer, chief of staff (1976–1978) and governor of Macau (1992–1999).
- Gabriel Yacoub, 72, French singer (Malicorne).

=== 23 ===
- Ali Reza Asahi, 50, Afghan bodybuilder.
- Eduardo de la Barra, 65, Chilean football player (Deportes Concepción, Naval) and manager (Ñublense), kidney cancer.
- Ted Bassett, 103, American horse racing executive.
- Anthony Basso, 45, French footballer (Udinese, Viking, Hearts).
- Peter Cirimwami Nkuba, Congolese military officer, governor of North Kivu (since 2023), shot.
- Dana Hudkins Crawford, 93, American architectural conservation developer and preservationist.
- Madior Diouf, 85, Senegalese politician.
- Alfonso Dulanto Rencoret, 81, Chilean politician, minister of mining (2002–2006).
- Louis Falk, 89, American bishop.
- Esther Jansma, 66, Dutch writer and poet, cancer.
- Krasimir Kochev, 50, Bulgarian Olympic wrestler (2000, 2004).
- Marriza, 57, Burmese singer and songwriter.
- Henry L. Marsh, 91, American politician, member of the Virginia Senate (1992–2014), mayor of Richmond, Virginia (1977–1982).
- Joseph Matarazzo, 99, Italian-born American psychologist, president of the American Psychological Association (1989).
- David G. A. McLean, 86, Canadian lawyer and businessman.
- Linda Mearns, 75, American geographer and climate scientist, pancreatic cancer.
- John Adams Morgan, 94, American banker and sailor, Olympic champion (1952).
- Greg Morton, 71, American football player (University of Michigan, Buffalo Bills).
- Neilton Mulim, 62, Brazilian politician, deputy (2007–2012), mayor of São Gonçalo (2013–2016).
- Ken Newland, 75, Australian footballer (Geelong, Footscray).
- Zibby Oneal, 90, American author (The Language of Goldfish).
- Diane Oxner, 96, Canadian soprano.
- Don Peachey, 91, American musician and bandleader.
- Ajay Pratap Singh, 60, Indian politician, Uttar Pradesh MLA (1989–2002, 2007–2008, 2017–2022).
- Andreas Stamatiadis, 89, Greek football player (AEK Athens, national team) and manager (Egaleo).
- Appunni Tharakan, 96, Indian artist.
- Stephan Thernstrom, 90, American academic and historian.
- Jeremiah Useni, 81, Nigerian politician, senator (2015–2019), governor of Bendel State (1984–1985).
- Benjamin Widom, 97, American chemist.
- Sonja Wiesmann, 58, Swiss politician, member of the Grand Council of Thurgau (2005–2024).

=== 24 ===
- Joseph A. Amato, 86, American author.
- Lakhdar Bouyahi, 79, Algerian footballer (NA Hussein Dey, national team).
- Buddy Brock, 72, American songwriter ("Watermelon Crawl", "There Ain't Nothin' Wrong with the Radio", "I Wanna Fall in Love").
- Rutherford Chang, 45, American conceptual artist.
- Iris Cummings, 104, American Olympic swimmer (1936) and aviator, last surviving participant of the 1936 Summer Olympics.
- Biruta Delle, 81, Latvian painter.
- Herman K. van Dijk, 78–79, Dutch economist.
- Mimis Domazos, 83, Greek footballer (Panathinaikos, AEK Athens, national team).
- Wahiba Faraʽa, Yemeni politician, minister of human rights (2001–2003).
- David Gaskell, 84, English footballer (Manchester United, Wrexham, Wigan Athletic).
- Michael Glaser, 81, American poet.
- John Groninga, 79, American politician, member of the Iowa House of Representatives (1983–1993).
- Curtis Halford, 81, American politician, member of the Tennessee House of Representatives (2009–2023).
- Joan Hanham, Baroness Hanham, 85, British politician, member of the House of Lords (1999–2020) and leader of the Kensington and Chelsea Council (1989–2000).
- Mala Htun, 55, American academic, cancer.
- Hirabai Lobi, 64–65, Indian tribal leader.
- Gianfranco Manfredi, 76, Italian singer and cartoonist.
- Toby McDonald, 73, Canadian curler and Olympic coach (2006).
- Jane McGarrigle, 83, Canadian songwriter and musician.
- Ann McKenna, 81, New Zealand cricketer (Canterbury, national team) and field hockey player (national team).
- Sekisuke Nakanishi, 98, Japanese politician, MP (1976–2003).
- Joe F. Ragland, 88, American politician, member of the Georgia House of Representatives (1967–1969).
- Ellert Schram, 85, Icelandic football player (KR, national team) and executive, chairman of KSÍ (1973–1989).
- Adrian Slade, 88, British politician and businessman.
- Jaune Quick-to-See Smith, 85, American visual artist and curator, pancreatic cancer.
- Mukarram Talabani, 101, Iraqi politician and writer, minister of irrigation (1972–1977) and transport (1977–1978).
- Unk, 43, American rapper ("Walk It Out", "2 Step", "Show Out"), heart attack.
- Louis C. Wagner Jr., 93, American general.
- David A. Washburn, 63, American psychologist, pancreatic cancer.
- Eddy Wauters, 91, Belgian football player (Antwerp, national team) and manager (Antwerp).
- Marcin Wicha, 52, Polish graphic designer and writer.
- Mirosław Żak, 88, Polish geodesist and academic.

=== 25 ===
- Anastasios of Albania, 95, Greek-Albanian Orthodox prelate, archbishop of Tirana and All Albania (since 1992), multiple organ failure.
- Greg Bell, 94, American long jumper, Olympic champion (1956).
- Joseph Bernal, 97, American politician, member of the Texas House of Representatives (1964–1966) and Senate (1966–1972).
- Tarun Bhartiya, 54, Indian filmmaker, poet and social activist, heart attack.
- Wolfram Bode, 82, German biochemist.
- Harpal Brar, 85, Indian politician.
- Gail Brewer-Giorgio, 85, American author.
- Marlène Canguio, 82, French Olympic track and field athlete (1964).
- K. M. Cherian, 82, Indian heart surgeon.
- Dražen Dalipagić, 73, Serbian Hall of Fame basketball player (Partizan, Carrera Venezia) and coach (Nuova Pallacanestro Gorizia), Olympic champion (1980).
- Bill Denny, 94, American politician, member of the Mississippi House of Representatives (1988–2020).
- Fathi Derder, 54, Swiss politician, MP (2011–2019).
- Yvonne Escher, 90, Swiss filmmaker.
- Bruce Seth Green, 83, American television director (1st & Ten, Buffy the Vampire Slayer, Babylon 5).
- Basil Hiley, 89, British physicist.
- Huang Mao-zong, 81, Taiwanese judge, justice of the Judicial Yuan (2008–2016).
- Olga James, 95, American singer and actress (Carmen Jones, Mr. Wonderful, The Bill Cosby Show).
- Latika Katt, 76, Indian sculptor.
- Harold Katz, 87, American nutrition industry and basketball executive, founder of Nutrisystem, and owner of the Philadelphia 76ers (1981–1996).
- Malcolm MacKay, 80, Canadian politician, Nova Scotia MLA (1978–1984).
- Ernie Nestor, 78, American college basketball coach (George Mason, Elon).
- Ole Neumann, 77, Danish actor (Father of Four, The Heir to Næsbygaard, Father of Four on Bornholm).
- Ikujiro Nonaka, 89, Japanese theorist and academician, pneumonia.
- Pei Rongfu, 100, Chinese engineer, member of the Chinese Academy of Engineering.
- Gloria Romero, 91, Filipino actress (Ilocana Maiden, Iginuhit ng Tadhana (The Ferdinand E. Marcos Story), Condemned).
- Brian Scrivens, 87, English dual-code rugby player (Newport RFC, Wigan).
- Faruk Şen, 76, Turkish-German academic. (death announced on this date)
- Laisenia Tuitubou, 69–70, Fijian politician.
- Alexander Turbanov, 74, Russian politician, MP (1993–1995).
- Bill Wilson, 80, Canadian hereditary chief and politician.

=== 26 ===
- Kazuyoshi Akiyama, 84, Japanese conductor (Vancouver Symphony Orchestra, Hiroshima Symphony Orchestra), complications from a fall.
- Antonio Amaya, 79, Panamanian boxer.
- Avtar Singh Bhurji, 80, Indian-born Ugandan Olympic field hockey player (1972).
- Heribert Blens, 88, German politician, MP (1983–2002).
- Gaositwe Chiepe, 102, Botswanan politician, minister of foreign affairs (1984–1994).
- Anthony J. DeMaria, 93, American researcher.
- Ernest Drucker, 84, American public health researcher, complications from dementia.
- Moses Effiong, 65, Nigerian footballer (Sharks, Shooting Stars, national team).
- Nicolas Florian, 55, French politician, mayor of Bordeaux (2019–2020), member of the Regional Council of Nouvelle-Aquitaine (since 2010), complications from a stroke.
- Robert Hay, 70, Australian footballer (South Melbourne).
- Mary Hodder, 79, Canadian politician, Newfoundland and Labrador MHA (1996–2003).
- Matthew Holden, 93, American political scientist.
- Signe Howell, 82, Norwegian social anthropologist.
- Pableaux Johnson, 59, American journalist and food writer, heart attack.
- Hans Klinga, 75, Swedish actor.
- Dulcinea Langfelder, 69, American multidisciplinary artist.
- Asbjørn Larsen, 88, Norwegian economist.
- Suzanne Massie, 94, American historian.
- Samarendra Narayan Dev, 84, Indian filmmaker.
- Norbert, 15, American therapy dog.
- Charles S. Parmenter, 91, American chemist.
- Mary Peach, 90, South African-born British actress (Room at the Top, Scrooge, Doctor Who).
- Malcolm Peyton, 93, American composer, concert director and conductor.
- Gary Phillips, 85, American basketball player (San Francisco Warriors, Boston Celtics).
- Arto Salomaa, 90, Finnish mathematician and computer scientist.
- Shafi, 56, Indian film director (One Man Show, Kalyanaraman, Pulival Kalyanam), complications from a stroke.
- K. M. Shafiullah, 90, Bangladeshi military officer and politician, chief of army staff (1972–1975), high commissioner to the United Kingdom (1987–1991), and MP (1996–2001).
- Alicia M. Soderberg, 47, American astrophysicist.
- Grant Tambling, 81, Australian politician, MHR (1980–1983), senator (1987–2001) and administrator of Norfolk Island (2003–2007).
- Hernán Vodanovic, 78, Chilean politician, senator (1990–1994).
- Éamonn Walsh, 79, Irish politician, TD (1992–1997).
- Bill Wilkerson, 82, Canadian business executive.
- Jim Wright, 89, American college football coach (Wichita State) (1974–1978).
- Igor Yankovsky, 73, Russian actor (Investigation Led by Experts, The Suicide Club, or the Adventures of a Titled Person, Charlotte's Necklace), cirrhosis.
- Sirpa Ylönen, 67, Finnish Olympic sport shooter (1984, 1988).
- Yannis Ziagas, 84, Greek politician, MEP (1982–1984), MP (1985–1993, 1996–2000).

=== 27 ===
- Alma Rosa Aguirre, 95, Mexican actress (The Stronger Sex, Nosotras las taquígrafas, The Border Man).
- Frederick Ahl, 83, American classical scholar.
- Chris Antonopoulos, 56, American soccer player (Fort Lauderdale Strikers).
- Joel Ayala Almeida, 78, Mexican trade unionist and politician, senator (2000–2006, 2012–2018) and three-time deputy.
- Dorothy Chin Brandt, 78, American judge.
- Guido Citterio, 93, Italian Olympic speed skater (1952, 1956).
- Michel Cogger, 85, Canadian political operative and politician, senator (1986–2000).
- Emilia Contessa, 67, Indonesian singer, actress (Calon Sarjana), and politician, MP (2014–2019), heart attack.
- Alonzo Davis, 82, American artist and academic.
- Guy Delhasse, 91, Belgian footballer (Liège, K. Beringen F.C., national team).
- Millicent Dillon, 99, American writer.
- Houcine Dimassi, 76, Tunisian politician, minister of finance (2011–2012).
- Robert Earl, 98, English traditional pop singer.
- Frank Fingland, 96, Canadian civil servant, commissioner of Yukon (1978–1979).
- Alberto Forelli, 78, Argentine Olympic swimmer (1968).
- Bruce Gossett, 83, American football player (Los Angeles Rams, San Francisco 49ers).
- Harold Green, 90, Tristanian politician.
- Pierre Guy, 93, French Olympic sports shooter (1960, 1964).
- Anna Hannevik, 99, Norwegian Salvation Army commissioner.
- Myles Hollander, 83, American academic statistician.
- Lotti Höner, 96, Swiss Olympic figure skater (1948).
- Iusein Ibram, 71, Romanian politician, MP (since 2016).
- Jang Mi-ja, 84, South Korean actress (King the Land, The Clinic for Married Couples: Love and War).
- Michael Katz, 85, American journalist (The New York Times, New York Daily News).
- Maung Khin Min, 83, Burmese writer.
- Frank Moerman, 87, Dutch Olympic rower (1960).
- Baldur Preiml, 85, Austrian ski jumper, Olympic bronze medalist (1968).
- Aaron Rossi, 44, American drummer (Ministry, Prong, John 5), heart attack.
- Sir Patrick Rowe, 85, British rear admiral.
- Joseph Sadan, 86, Israeli academic. (death announced on this date)
- Andrew N. Schofield, 94, British engineer (University of Cambridge).
- Elisa Rae Shupe, 61, American army soldier, first person in the United States to be legally recognized as non-binary.
- Efrem Winters, 61, American basketball player (Illinois Fighting Illini).

=== 28 ===
- Kenneth Cameron, Baron Cameron of Lochbroom, 93, Scottish advocate and judge, Lord Advocate (1984–1989), senator of the College of Justice and member of the House of Lords (1984–2016).
- Miranda Cicognani, 88, Italian Olympic gymnast (1952, 1956, 1960).
- Marina Colasanti, 87, Italian-born Brazilian writer.
- Joe Daniel, 70, Tanzanian-born Canadian politician, MP (2011–2015).
- Leroy DeLeon, 76, Trinidadian footballer (Phoenix Inferno, Washington Diplomats, national team), complications from multiple strokes.
- Alan Demack, 90, Australian judge.
- Arnaldo Gruarin, 86, Italian-born French rugby union player (RC Toulon, national team).
- Nick Heather, 86, British clinical psychologist and alcohol researcher.
- Serapion Kolosnitsin, 60, Russian Orthodox prelate, traffic collision.
- Catherine Laborde, 73, French weather presenter (TF1) and author, dementia with Lewy bodies.
- William Leuchtenburg, 102, American historian and author.
- Theo Magin, 92, German politician, MP (1980–1994).
- Brian Maidment, 78, British historian.
- Galina Minaicheva, 95, Russian artistic gymnast, Olympic champion (1952).
- Takuro Morinaga, 67, Japanese economist and academic, pancreatic cancer.
- Richard R. Nelson, 94, American economist.
- Graham Nickson, 78, British artist.
- Sulevi Peltola, 78, Finnish actor, recipient of the Jussi Award for Best Actor (2002).
- David Noel Ramírez Padilla, 75, Mexican academic administrator, rector of the Monterrey Institute of Technology and Higher Education (2011–2017).
- Mahmoud Saeed, 86, Iraqi-born American novelist.
- Al Sarrantonio, 72, American author.
- Muhammad bin Fahd Al Saud, 75, Saudi royal, politician, and philanthropist, governor of Eastern Province (1985–2013).
- Gene Schroeder, 95, American football player (Chicago Bears).
- Loulia Sheppard, 80, English hair stylist (Victoria & Abdul, Harry Potter and the Chamber of Secrets, Guardians of the Galaxy).
- Mikhail Shkabardnya, 94, Russian politician, member of the Soviet of the Union (1979–1989).
- Abdul Momen Talukder, 72, Bangladeshi politician, MP (2001–2014).
- Jorge Luis Valdés, 63, Cuban baseball player, Olympic champion (1992).
- Mark Thabo Weinberg, 51, South African social activist.

=== 29 ===
- Julian Bennett, 75, British archaeologist.
- Folke Brundin, 61, Swedish Olympic rower (1988).
- Denis Devaux, 86, French footballer (Poitiers, national team).
- Martha Hilda González Calderón, 59, Mexican politician, deputy (2015–2018).
- Edward Greer, 100, American major general.
- Gianpaolo Grisandi, 60, Italian Olympic cyclist (1988).
- Scott M. Grundy, 91, American physician.
- Joe Hale, 99, American animator (Sleeping Beauty, The Black Hole) and film producer (The Black Cauldron).
- Ivan Haralampiev, 78, Bulgarian linguist.
- Barry Hartle, 85, English footballer (Sheffield United, Macclesfield Town, Watford).
- John Huard, 80, American Hall of Fame football player (Maine Black Bears, Denver Broncos, Toronto Argonauts).
- Christopher Hughes, 77, English professional quizzer (Eggheads).
- Susan Iversen, 84, British experimental psychologist.
- Judy Johnson, 100, American singer.
- Bob Lingenfelter, 70, American football player (Cleveland Browns, Minnesota Vikings).
- Harold Luntz, 87, Australian academician.
- Salwan Momika, 38, Iraqi anti-Islam activist, shot.
- Walter L. Murphy, 87, American jurist, justice (1983–2000) and chief justice (2000–2003) of the New Hampshire Superior Court.
- Elisabeth Niggemeyer, 94, German photographer (Die gemordete Stadt).
- Sally J. Novetzke, 93, American political aide and diplomat, ambassador to Malta (1989–1993).
- Charles Oluka, Ugandan general, director general of the ISO (since 2020).
- Timothy Robertson, 92, American politician, member of the New Hampshire House of Representatives (1992–2000, 2002–2010, 2012–2016).
- Max Schautzer, 84, Austrian-born German television and radio presenter (Westdeutscher Rundfunk).
- Hans Joachim Schliep, 79, German theologian.
- Mavai Senathirajah, 82, Sri Lankan politician, MP (1989–1994, 1999–2020).
- Atomu Shimojō, 78, Japanese actor (Brother and Sister, House on Fire).
- Shawn Simpson, 56, Canadian ice hockey player (Baltimore Skipjacks) and broadcaster (TSN 1200).
- Gideon Spiro, 89, Israeli journalist and activist.
- Gary Stevens, 81, Australian rugby league player (South Sydney, Canterbury Bulldogs, national team).
- Jenny Sunderland, 70, Australian Olympic gymnast (1972).
- Gianfranco de Taddeo, 96, Swiss footballer (Cantonal Neuchatel, Young Boys, La Chaux-de-Fonds).
- Sir John Walker, 88, British air force officer, chief of Defence Intelligence (1991–1994).
- Sir John Waters, 89, British general, Deputy Supreme Allied Commander Europe (1993–1994).
- Klaus Willbrand, 83, German bookseller and TikToker.
- Richard Williamson, 84, English traditionalist Catholic prelate, bishop of the Society of Saint Pius X (1988–2012), brain haemorrhage.
- Notable people killed in the Potomac River mid-air collision:
  - Alexandr Kirsanov, 46, Azerbaijani-American ice dancer
  - Vadim Naumov, 55, Russian Olympic figure skater (1992, 1994), world champion (1994)
  - Evgenia Shishkova, 52, Russian Olympic figure skater (1992, 1994), world champion (1994)
  - Inna Volyanskaya, 59, Russian pair skater

=== 30 ===
- Sammy Acaylar, 66, Filipino volleyball coach (Perpetual Altas, Quezon City Gerflor Defenders, national team), complications from a stroke.
- Zoltán Boros, 76, Hungarian orienteering competitor.
- Tapan Bose, 78, Indian filmmaker and peace activist.
- Francis Boyle, 74, American human rights lawyer and author (The Tamil Genocide by Sri Lanka).
- Dick Button, 95, American figure skater, Olympic champion (1948, 1952), five-time world champion.
- Wanelge Castillo, 79, Panamanian Olympic wrestler (1968, 1972).
- Sir Julius Chan, 85, Papua New Guinean politician, prime minister (1980–1982, 1994–1997, 1997), governor of New Ireland (since 2007).
- Andrée Dumon, 102, Belgian Resistance member during World War II.
- Marianne Faithfull, 78, English singer ("As Tears Go By"), songwriter ("Broken English") and actress (The Girl on a Motorcycle).
- Tom Jackson, 76, American football coach (Connecticut Huskies).
- Edcel Lagman, 82, Filipino politician, member of the House of Representatives (1987–1998, 2004–2013, since 2016), cardiac arrest.
- Don LeBrun, 89, American politician, member of the New Hampshire House of Representatives (2010–2018).
- Christopher Lethbridge, 63, English cricketer (Cambridgeshire, Warwickshire).
- Galina Matvievskaya, 94, Russian historian, full member of the Academy of Sciences of Uzbekistan.
- Bethwell Allan Ogot, 95, Kenyan historian.
- Leif "Loket" Olsson, 82, Swedish television and radio host (Bingolotto) and Olympic handball referee.
- Kåre Øvregard, 91, Norwegian politician, MP (1977–1989).
- David Paetz, 84, New Zealand cricketer.
- Raj Pannu, 91, Canadian politician, Alberta MLA (1997–2008).
- Daniel L. Ritchie, 93, American businessman, chancellor of the University of Denver (1988–2005).
- Lyall Schwarzkopf, 93, American politician, member of the Minnesota House of Representatives (1963–1972).
- Don Secrist, 80, American baseball player (Chicago White Sox).
- Michael Sheetz, 78, American biochemist.
- İlhan Usmanbaş, 103, Turkish composer.
- John C. Van Hollen, 91, American politician, member of the Wisconsin State Assembly (1967–1971).
- Stanley Larson Welsh, 96, American botanist.

=== 31 ===
- Susan Alcorn, 71, American composer and pedal steel guitarist.
- William Brown, 94, Northern Irish politician, MLA (1982–1986).
- Ronnie Burbeck, 90, English footballer (Middlesbrough, Leicester City, Hereford United).
- Sakkie de Klerk, 86, South African rugby union player (Western Province, national team).
- Buster Farrer, 88, South African cricketer (Border, national team), tennis player and field hockey player.
- Carlos Ferrero, 83, Peruvian politician, prime minister (2003–2005), member (1992–2006) and president (2000–2003) of Congress.
- Valentin Franke, 98, Russian theoretical physicist.
- Carolyn Gargasz, 87, American politician, member of the New Hampshire House of Representatives (2000–2018).
- Martin Graber, 72, American politician, member of the Iowa House of Representatives (since 2021).
- David Hill, 78, English rugby league footballer (Wigan, Oldham, Great Britain).
- Ryan Kiesel, 45, American politician, member of the Oklahoma House of Representatives (2004–2010), cancer.
- Jackie King, 79–80, British-born South African hydrologist. (death announced on this date)
- Derek McLean, 92, English footballer (Middlesbrough, Hartlepool United).
- Peter Penlington, 92, New Zealand lawyer and judge, King's Counsel (since 1978), High Court judge (1990–2000).
- Táňa Radeva, 67, Slovak actress (Bathory, Lóve, Dubček).
- Sigurd Erlend Reksnes, 48, Norwegian politician MP (since 2013), cancer.
- Robert Rummer, 97, American real estate developer.
- Abdelhamid Slama, 83, Tunisian politician.
- Karl Sørmo, 88, Norwegian politician, MP (1989–1993).
- Kärt Tomingas, 57, Estonian actress (Those Old Love Letters, Zero Point), singer and educator.
- Mohammed Al-Tuwaiyan, 79, Saudi actor, author, and visual artist.
