= Singhateh =

Singhateh is a surname of Gambian origin. Notable people with the surname include:

- Fanta Singhateh (1929–2023), First Lady of the Gambia (1966–1970)
- Farimang Singhateh (1912–1977), Governor-General of the Gambia
- Kalilou Singhateh (1934–2025), Gambian politician
- Mama Fatima Singhateh (born 1974), Gambian lawyer, judge, and politician
- Sally Singhateh (born 1977), Gambian poet and novelist
- Ebrima Singhateh (born 2003), Gambian footballer

== See also ==
- Edward Singateh (born 1968), Gambian politician
