= Dorigo =

Dorigo is an Italian surname. Notable people with the surname include:

- Aldo Dorigo (1929-2025), Italian footballer
- Marco Dorigo (born 1961), Italian scientist
- Max Dorigo (born 1936), French basketball player
- Tony Dorigo (born 1965), Australian-born English footballer
