= Roswitha Erlenwein =

German politician (1930–2025)

Member of the Bürgerschaft of Bremen
- In office 1983–1995

Personal details
- Born: 21 August 1930 Munich, Bavaria, Germany
- Died: 1 January 2025 (aged 94)
- Party: CDU

Roswitha Erlenwein (21 August 1930 – 1 January 2025) was a German politician. A member of the Christian Democratic Union, she served in the Bürgerschaft of Bremen from 1983 to 1995.

Erlenwein died on 1 January 2025, at the age of 94.
