= Rollin Howell =

American politician (born 1929)

Member of the Iowa House of Representatives
- In office 1973–1983

Personal details
- Born: March 24, 1929 (age 97) Rockford, Iowa, U.S.
- Party: Democratic
- Occupation: farmer

Rollin Howell (March 24, 1929 – January 7, 2025) was an American retired politician in the state of Iowa.

== Life and career ==
Rollin Howell was born in Rockford, Iowa on March 24, 1929. He was a farmer. Howell served in the Iowa House of Representatives from 1973 to 1983 as a Democrat. He died on January 7, 2025.
