= Sonja Wiesmann =

Swiss politician (1966–2025)

Member of the Grand Council of Thurgau
- In office 2005–2024

Personal details
- Born: 23 February 1966; Müllheim, Switzerland
- Died: 23 January 2025 (aged 58)
- Political party: SP
- Occupation: Civil engineer

Sonja Wiesmann (23 February 1966 – 23 January 2025) was a Swiss politician. A member of the Social Democratic Party, she served in the Grand Council of Thurgau from 2005 to 2024.

Wiesmann died on 23 January 2025, at the age of 58.
