= Mohammed Al-Tuwaiyan =

Saudi actor, author and visual artist (1945–2025)

Muhammad Al-Tuwayan
- Born: 9 May 1945
- Died: 31 January 2025 (aged 79)
- Citizenship: Saudi
- Awards: National Cultural Awards, 2024
- Honours: Gulf Film Festival, 2024

Muhammad Al-Tuwayan (Arabic: محمد الطويان; 9 May 1945 – 31 January 2025) was a Saudi actor, author, and visual artist. He received the "Theater and Performing Arts" award from the National Cultural Awards Initiative in its fourth edition in 2024.

== Life and career ==
Al-Tuwayan began his acting career in the mid-1960s, appearing in a variety of television series and evening shows from 1965 to 1974. His breakout role came in 1982 when he portrayed Hazeez in the television series "Al-Sa'ad Wa'ad." He continued to build his career with a notable role in "Awdet Osoeid" in 1985. Al-Tuwayan was also a regular participant in the popular series "Tash Ma Tash," appearing in ten consecutive seasons. His other significant works include roles in "Ghash Mashm 2009," "Selfie," "Game of the Adults," and "A Place in the Heart."

Al-Tuwayan died on 31 January 2025, at the age of 79.

== Awards and honours ==
Al-Tuwayan won the "Theater and Performing Arts" award from the National Cultural Awards Initiative in its fourth edition in 2024.

He was honored at the opening of the Gulf Film Festival in its fourth edition in 2024.
