= Samuel Butler (lawyer) =

American lawyer (1930–2025)

Samuel Butler (March 10, 1930 – January 4, 2025) was an American lawyer. He was the managing partner at the New York law firm Cravath Swaine & Moore. He was an adviser on many major mergers and acquisitions in the 1980s and 1990s.
