= Philippe Moreau Defarges =

French political scientist (1943–2025)

- Born: 19 April 1943; Paris, German-occupied France
- Died: 15 January 2025 (aged 81)
- Education: Sciences Po; University of Paris; École nationale d'administration
- Occupation: Political scientist

Philippe Moreau Defarges (19 April 1943 – 15 January 2025) was a French political scientist who specialized in international relations, geopolitics, pro-Europeanism, and globalisation.

Moreau Defarges was an outspoken opponent of alter-globalization. He died on 15 January 2025, at the age of 81.

== Works ==
- La mondialisation : vers la fin des frontières ? (1993)
- Introduction à la géopolitique (1994)
- Repentance et Réconciliation (Repentance and Reconciliation) (1999)
- Dictionary of Geopolitics (2002)
- L’Ordre mondial (The World Order) (2003)
- Comprendre la Constitution européenne (Understanding The European Constitution) (2005)
- Les Institutions européennes (The European Institutions) (2005)
- Introduction à la géopolitique (Introduction to geopolitics) (2005)
- Droits d’ingérence (Rights of Intervention) (2006)
- Où va l’Europe ? (Whither Europe ?) (2006)
- Relations internationales (International Relations) (2007)
- La Géopolitique pour les Nuls (2008)
- La Gouvernance (Governance) (2008)
- La Guerre ou la paix demain ? (2009)
- La Mondialisation (Globalisation) (2010)
- La Tentation du repli, Mondialisation, démondialisation (2018)
- Une histoire mondiale de la paix (A World History of Peace) (2020)
