= Wulf Traugott Kruse =

German politician (1936–2025)

Member of the Bürgerschaft of Bremen
- In office 1975–1976

Personal details
- Born: 30 June 1936 Bremen, Gau Weser-Ems, Germany
- Died: 12 January 2025 (aged 88)
- Party: FDP
- Occupation: Pastor

Wulf Traugott Kruse (30 June 1936 – 12 January 2025) was a German politician. A member of the Free Democratic Party, he served in the Bürgerschaft of Bremen from 1975 to 1976.

Kruse died on 12 January 2025, at the age of 88.
