= Françoise Choay =

French historian (1925–2025)

Françoise Choay (29 March 1925 – 8 January 2025) was a French architectural and urban historian and theorist. From 1973 on, she was a professor at the University of Paris. She was also a visiting professor at numerous universities in the United States, Belgium and Italy.

Choay was born on 29 March 1925 in Paris. She was awarded the Grand Prix national du Livre d'architecture in 1981 and 2007.

Choay died on 8 January 2025, at the age of 99.

== Publications ==
- — (1960) Le Corbusier, George Braziller
- — (1969) The Modern City: Planning in the Nineteenth Century, George Braziller
- — (1992) L'allégorie du patrimoine, Seuil
- — (1997) The Rule and the Model: On the Theory of Architecture and Urbanism, MIT Press
- — (2001) The invention of the historic monument, Cambridge University Press
- — (2009). Le Patrimoine en questions: Anthologie pour un combat (in French). ISBN 978-2-02-100494-6. OL 30763957M. Wikidata Q48757378.
