= Dorothy Chin Brandt =

American judge (1946–2025)

Dorothy Chin Brandt (April 9, 1946 – January 27, 2025) was an American judge. She became the first female Asian American judge in the state of New York when she was elected to the New York City Civil Court in 1987. She was also the first Chinese American to be elected to public office in all of Manhattan.

== Early life and education ==
Brandt had a bachelor's degree in political science from the University of Chicago. She was a graduate of Brooklyn Law School and earned of master of laws degree at Harvard Law School, where she was assistant dean. Her grandmother, Gun Lou Chin, was a native of Philadelphia who in 1939 became the first Chinese American woman to serve on a jury in Queens.

== Career ==
Brandt became the first female Asian American judge in the state of New York when she was elected to the New York City Civil Court in 1987. She was also the first Chinese American to be elected to public office in all of Manhattan. In 2001, she was appointed an acting New York Supreme Court justice, Criminal Term, Queens County.

Brandt retired from the bench in 2016 or 2017.

== Personal life ==
Brandt had a personal collection of Chinese art including jade items, calligraphy, and drawings. She died of complications from sepsis in a hospital in Queens at age 78. She was engaged to musician Jack Macco, for 11 years, until her death in 2025.
