= Alexander Turbanov =

Russian politician (1950–2025)

- Александр Турбанов

Member of the State Duma
- In office 12 December 1993 – 16 December 1995

Personal details
- Born: Alexander Vladimirovich Turbanov; 31 January 1950; Chelyabinsk, Russian SFSR, USSR
- Died: 25 January 2025 (aged 74); Moscow, Russia
- Political party: PRES
- Education: Sverdlovsk Law Institute
- Occupation: Lawyer

Alexander Vladimirovich Turbanov (Russian: Алекса́ндр Влади́мирович Турба́нов; 31 January 1950 – 25 January 2025) was a Russian politician. A member of the Party of Russian Unity and Accord, he served in the State Duma from 1993 to 1995.

Turbanov died in Moscow on 25 January 2025, at the age of 74.
