= Federico Manca =

Italian chess player

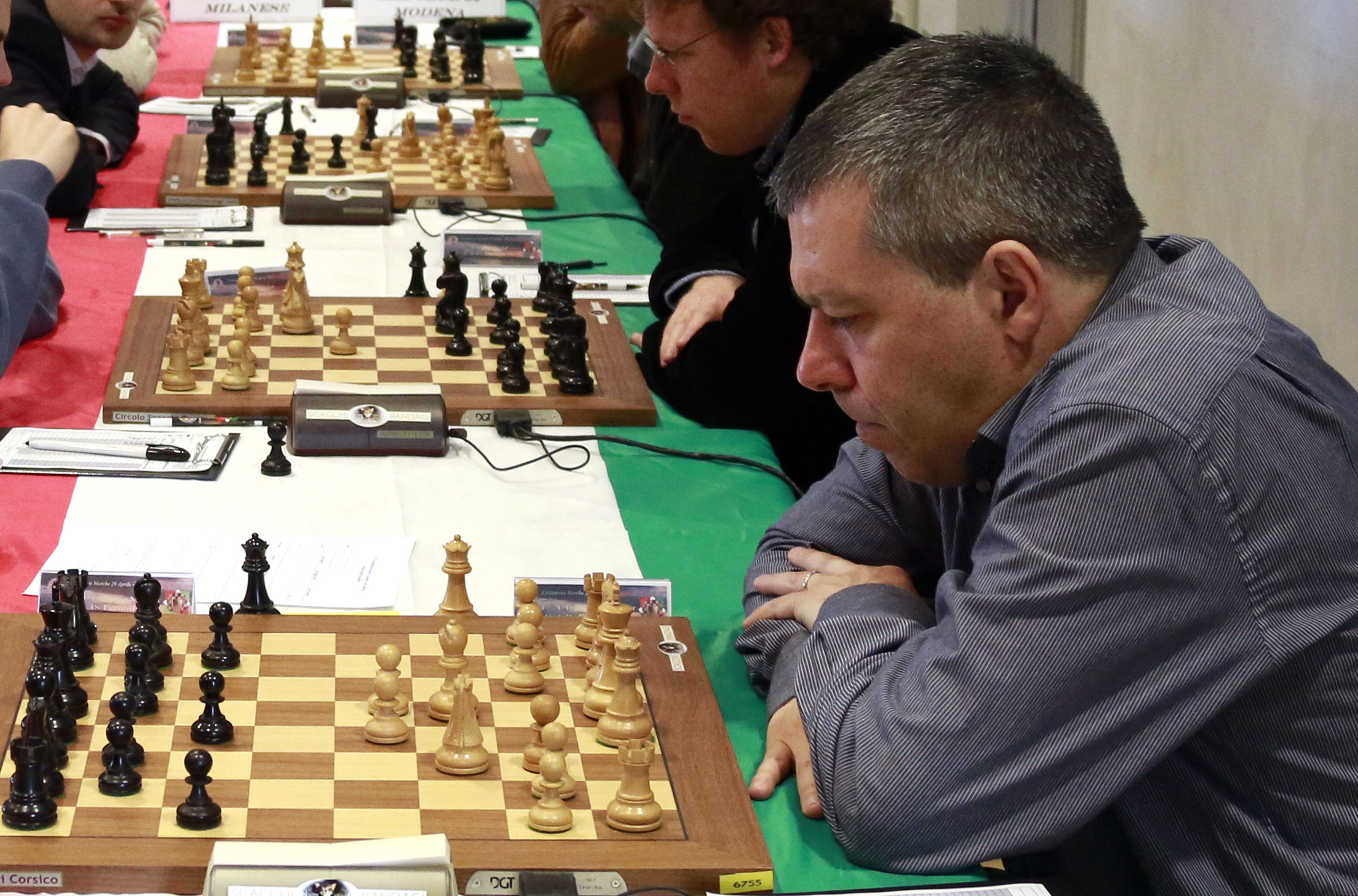
- Manca in 2015

Personal information
- Born: 6 May 1969 Padua, Veneto, Italy
- Died: 16 January 2025 (aged 55) Budapest, Hungary

Chess career
- Country: Italy
- Title: International Master
- Peak rating: 2433 (October 2012)

Federico Manca (6 May 1969 – 16 January 2025) was an Italian chess player. He competed at the 1990 Chess Olympiad, winning the bronze medal in the second reserve category. Corriere della Sera named him "the strongest Paduan player in history".

Manca died on 16 January 2025, in Budapest, at the age of 55.
