= Biruta Delle =

Latvian painter (1944–2025)

- Born: Biruta Priekule; 17 January 1944; Riga, Reichskommissariat Ostland (now Latvia)
- Died: 22 January 2025 (aged 81)
- Known for: Painting
- Movement: Realism

Biruta Delle (17 January 1944 –22 January 2025) was a Latvian painter mainly noted for her portraits and landscapes.

== Biography ==
Delle was born Biruta Priekule on 17 January 1944, in Riga, in a family of laborers. Her husband was Jānis Kampars, a philosopher.

The first interest in art Delle obtained in the Riga 2nd secondary school, where she was taught by Auseklis Baušķenieks and Ansis Stunda. Biruta Delle attended the Art Academy of Latvia (1964- 1967) where one of the most important teachers for her artistic development was Konrāds Ubāns. Delle had been participating in exhibitions since 1967 and has organised solo exhibitions in Kuldīga, Jūrmala, Riga, Mazirbe, Cēsis, Tukums, Smiltene and elsewhere. She was a member of the Artists Union of Latvia since 1975.

In 2013, an album of Biruta Delle's works compiled by art scholar Anda Treija was published, which contains approximately 200 reproductions of the artist's works. Publisher – "Daugava" gallery.

Delle died on 24 January 2025, at the age of 81.

== Art ==
Biruta Delle worked in oil, paints landscapes, portraits and figurative compositions. Paintings usually groups on cycles.

The portraits of Biruta Delle have been posed by specific people, their individual features can be drawn in them, however, the details, gestures and names indicate a certain generalization, some grotesque elements are also used, which are very characteristic of the artist.

== Selected works ==
Figurative paintings:

- Prometheus, 1971
- Gordian Knot, 1973

Portraits:

- Self-portrait, 2012
