= Dick Price (politician) =

American politician (1933–2025)

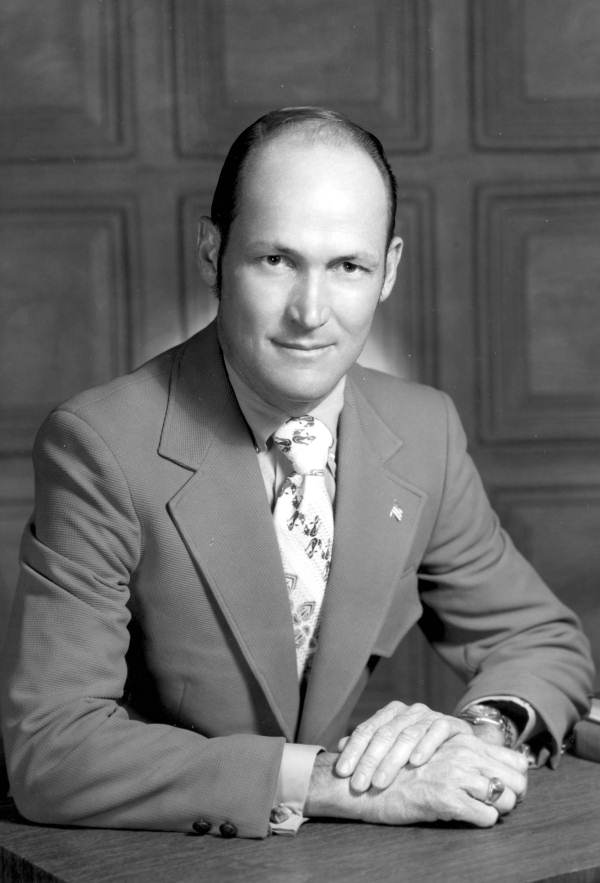

Member of the Florida House of Representatives for the 59th district
- In office 1973–1976

Personal details
- Born: August 14, 1933 Miami, Florida, U.S.
- Died: January 4, 2025 (aged 91)
- Party: Republican
- Occupation: Investigation and security executive

Richard Allen Price (August 14, 1933 – January 4, 2025) was an American politician in the state of Florida.

Price was born in Miami and attended the University of South Florida. He served in the Florida House of Representatives from 1973 to 1976, as a Republican, representing the 59th district.
