= Jan Mijnsbergen =

Dutch politician (1939–2025)

Member of the Senate of the Netherlands
- In office 6 March 1990 – 10 June 1991
- In office 10 June 1981 – 13 September 1983

Personal details
- Born: Jan Wilhelm Mijnsbergen; 18 January 1939; Vlissingen, Netherlands
- Died: 19 January 2025 (aged 86); Vlissingen, Netherlands
- Political party: PvdA
- Occupation: Urban planner

Jan Wilhelm Mijnsbergen (18 January 1939 – 19 January 2025) was a Dutch politician. A member of the Labour Party, he served in the Senate from 1981 to 1983 and again from 1990 to 1991.

Mijnsbergen died in Vlissingen on 19 January 2025, at the age of 86.
