= Hans Simon =

German water polo player

Personal information
- Nationality: German
- Born: 25 January 1947; Lünen, Germany
- Died: 20 January 2025 (aged 77)
- Height: 185 cm (6 ft 1 in)
- Weight: 95 kg (209 lb; 14 st 13 lb)

Sport
- Sport: Water polo

Hans Simon (25 January 1947 – 20 January 2025) was a German water polo player. He competed at the 1972 Summer Olympics and the 1976 Summer Olympics.
