= Yoon Ju-yeong =

South Korean politician (1928–2025)

- 윤주영

Member of the National Assembly of South Korea
- In office 12 March 1973 – 11 March 1979

Personal details
- Born: 26 July 1928; Jangdan County, Korea, Empire of Japan
- Died: 6 January 2025 (aged 96); Seoul, South Korea
- Political party: Yushin Political Comrades Association
- Education: Korea University; Columbia University
- Occupation: Journalist

Yoon Ju-yeong (Korean: 윤주영; 26 July 1928 – 6 January 2025) was a South Korean politician. A member of Yushin Political Comrades Association, he served in the National Assembly from 1973 to 1979.

Yoon died on 6 January 2025, at the age of 96.
