= Jüri Martin =

Estonian politician (1940–2025)

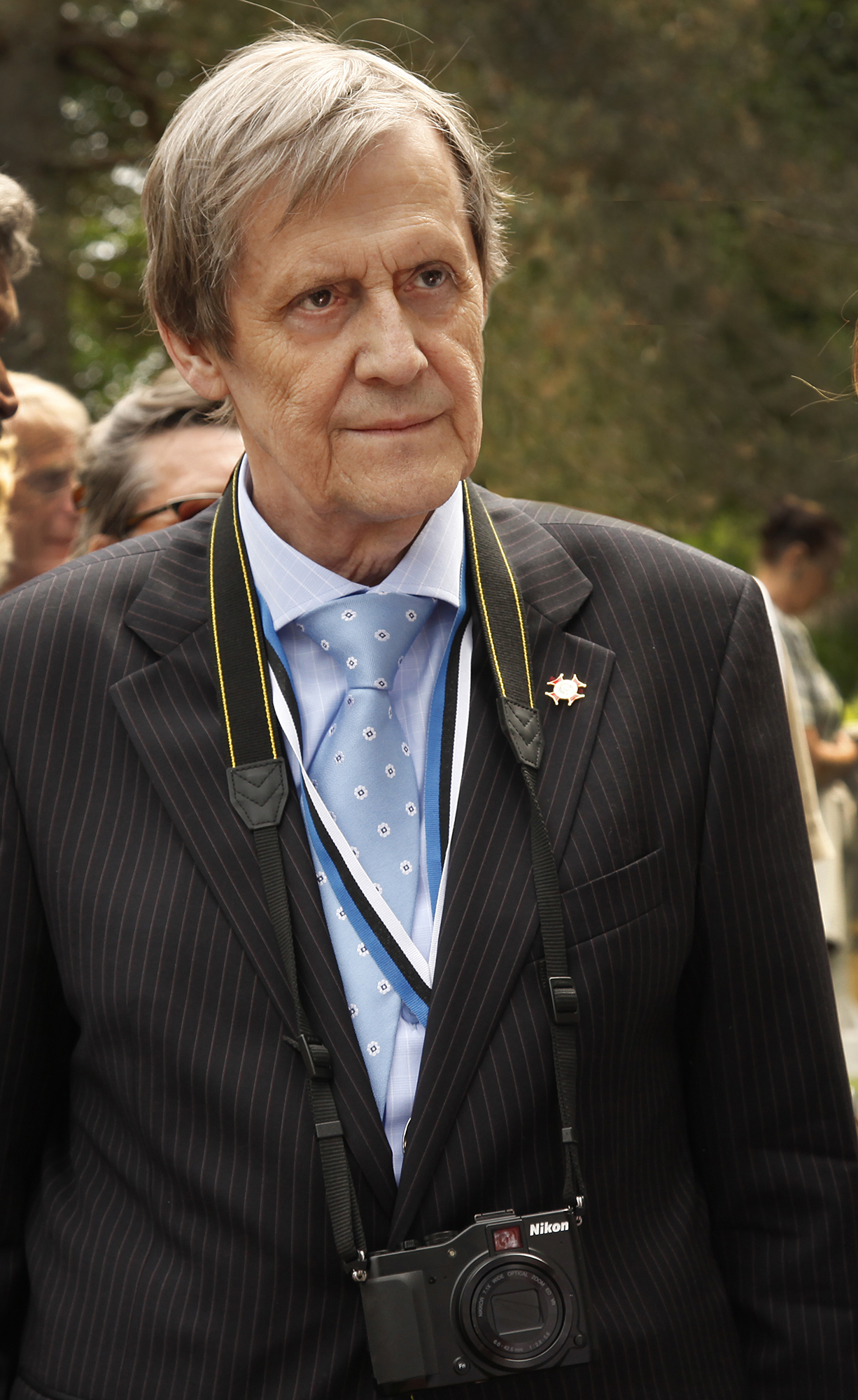
Martin in 2014

Jüri Martin (29 September 1940 – 21 January 2025) was an Estonian biologist and politician. He was a member of IX Riigikogu. Martin was born on 29 September 1940, and died on 21 January 2025, at the age of 84.
