= Ricardo Chapa =

Mexican water polo player (born 1948)

Personal information
- Nationality: Mexican
- Born: 3 April 1948
- Died: 13 January 2025 (aged 76)

Sport
- Sport: Water polo

Ricardo Chapa (3 April 1948 – 13 January 2025) was a Mexican water polo player. He competed in the men's tournament at the 1972 Summer Olympics.
