= Calon Sarjana =

Indonesian YouTube channel

YouTube information
- Channel: Calon Sarjana
- Years active: 2016-present
- Genre: Information
- Subscribers: 12.8 million
- Views: 223 million
- Last updated: 19 May 2026

Calon Sarjana (lit. Bachelor's Candidate) is an Indonesian YouTube channel, managed by Andre, Jennie, and Revi. Their channel associated with the Infia network.

At the time of its closure, the channel had over 13 million subscribers. In the years 2019–20, after the channel copied a video by British YouTuber JT, he found out that the channel was stealing videos from numerous other major channels, and eventually got the channel terminated on copyright grounds.

On 22 January 2020, Calon Sarjana's main channel was removed by YouTube due to several claims of copyright infringement. As a substitute for Calon Sarjana, the manager from the channel uses Calon Ilmuwan instead of Calon Sarjana. However, in October 2024, Calon Sarjana's main channel was officially restored.
