= Hayotxon Ortiqboyeva =

Uzbek poet and politician (1946 or 1947 – 2025)

Hayotxon Ortiqboyeva (Uzbek: Ҳаётхон Ортиқбоева; 1946 or 1947 – 10 January 2025) was an Uzbek poet and politician. She was a senator from 2004 to 2009. Ortiqboyeva died on 10 January 2025, at the age of 78.
