= Ernest Drucker =

American public health researcher (died 2025)

Ernest Drucker (March 29, 1940 – January 26, 2025) was an American public health researcher.

In 2011 Drucker published the book A Plague of Prisons: The Epidemiology of Mass Incarceration in America.

In 2018 Drucker published Decarcerating America: From Mass Punishment to Public Health, a collection of essays examining mass incarceration in the United States from a public health perspective.
