= Luís Cechinel =

Brazilian politician (1944–2025)

Member of the Chamber of Deputies for Santa Catarina
- In office 1 February 1979 – 31 January 1983

Personal details
- Born: Luís Antônio Cechinel; 7 September 1944 Urussanga, Santa Catarina, Brazil
- Died: 16 January 2025 (aged 80) Itajaí, Santa Catarina, Brazil
- Political party: MDB
- Education: Universidade do Vale do Itajaí

Luís Antônio Cechinel (7 September 1944 – 16 January 2025) was a Brazilian politician. A member of the Brazilian Democratic Movement, he served in the Chamber of Deputies from 1979 to 1983.

Cechinel died in Itajaí on 16 January 2025, at the age of 80.
