= Paquita Ors =

Spanish pharmacist and businesswoman (1928–2025)

Francisca Ors Jarrín (18 February 1928 – 10 January 2025), known as Paquita Ors, was a Spanish pharmacist and pioner cosmetic businesswoman. She died on 10 January 2025, at the age of 96.
