= Pierre Rabischong =

French neuroanatomist (1932–2025)

- Born: 1 March 1932
- Died: 18 January 2025; Montpellier
- Occupation: Medical doctor

Pierre Rabischong (1 March 1932 – 18 January 2025) was a French neuroanatomist and an emeritus professor at the University of Montpellier in France. He is known for his work in rehabilitation medicine and physiotherapy, as well as powered orthoses. Rabischong was the leader of the AMOLL (active modular orthosis for lower limbs) project in 1975. He was born on 1 March 1932, and died on 18 January 2025, at the age of 92.
