= C. Marshall Cain =

American politician (1934–2025)

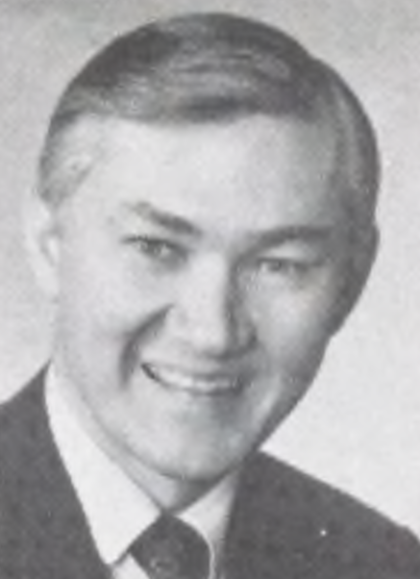
- Cain in 1980

Member of the South Carolina House of Representatives from Aiken County
- In office 1969–1974
- In office 1979–1980

Deputy Assistant Attorney General of the United States Department of Justice
- In office 1981–1996
- President: Ronald Reagan; George H. W. Bush; Bill Clinton

Personal details
- Born: Charles Marshall Cain; July 20, 1934 Richmond, Virginia, U.S.
- Died: January 13, 2025 (aged 90) Aiken, South Carolina, U.S.
- Party: Republican
- Education: University of South Carolina

Charles Marshall Cain (July 20, 1934 – January 13, 2025) was an American politician. A member of the Republican Party, he served in the South Carolina House of Representatives from 1969 to 1974 and again from 1979 to 1980 and as deputy assistant attorney general of the United States Department of Justice from 1981 to 1996.

== Life and career ==
Cain was born in Richmond, Virginia, the son of Calvin Howard Cain and Helen Holley. He attended the University of South Carolina, earning his BS degree in 1957 and his LLB degree in 1959. After earning his degrees, he served in the District of Columbia Air National Guard from 1959 to 1960, which after his service in the national guard, he worked as a lawyer.

Cain served in the South Carolina House of Representatives from 1969 to 1974 and again from 1979 to 1980. After his service in the House, he served as deputy assistant attorney general of the United States Department of Justice from 1981 to 1996.

== Death ==
Cain died in Aiken, South Carolina, on January 13, 2025, at the age of 90.
