= Vitaliy Khyzhniak =

Ukrainian politician (1934–2025)

- Віталій Хижняк
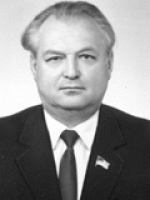

People's Deputy of Ukraine
- In office 15 May 1990 – 10 May 1994

Personal details
- Born: Vitaliy Mykhailovych Khyzhniak; 25 October 1934 Chukiv, Vinnytsia Oblast, Ukrainian SSR, USSR
- Died: 20 January 2025 (aged 90)
- Party: CPSU
- Education: Bila Tserkva Agricultural Institute
- Occupation: Veterinarian

Vitaliy Mykhailovych Khyzhniak (Ukrainian: Віталій Михайлович Хижня́к; 25 October 1934 – 20 January 2025) was a Ukrainian politician. A member of the Communist Party of the Soviet Union, he served in the Verkhovna Rada from 1990 to 1994.

Khyzhniak died on 20 January 2025, at the age of 90.
