= Dennis True =

German politician (1988–2025)

Member of the Landtag of Lower Saxony
- In office 8 November 2022 – 4 January 2025
- Succeeded by: Karola Margraf

Personal details
- Born: 3 December 1988; Delmenhorst, Lower Saxony, West Germany
- Died: 4 January 2025 (aged 36)
- Political party: SPD
- Education: University of Applied Sciences Bremerhaven
- Occupation: Computer engineer

Dennis True (3 December 1988 – 4 January 2025) was a German politician. A member of the Social Democratic Party, he served in the Landtag of Lower Saxony from 2022 to 2025.

True died of cancer on 4 January 2025, at the age of 36.
