= Robert Hay (footballer) =

Australian rules footballer (1954–2025)

Personal information
- Full name: Robert Frederick Hay
- Born: 21 September 1954
- Died: 26 January 2025 (aged 70)
- Height: 183 cm (6 ft 0 in)
- Weight: 84 kg (185 lb)

Playing career^{1}
Years	Club	Games (Goals)
1971–72	South Melbourne	14 (1)
- ^{1} Playing statistics correct to the end of 1972.

Robert Frederick Hay (21 September 1954 – 26 January 2025) was an Australian rules footballer who played with South Melbourne in the Victorian Football League (VFL). Hay died on 26 January 2025, at the age of 70.
