= Brian Maidment =

British historian (1946–2025)

Brian Edwin Maidment (19 March 1946 – 28 January 2025) was a British historian who specialised in the history of British print culture in the 18th and 19th centuries. He held professorships at the University of Huddersfield, University of Salford and Liverpool John Moores University.

== Life and career ==
Born on 19 March 1946 in Lyndhurst, Hampshire, Brian Edwin Maidment was the son of Gladys (née Brookbanks) and Harry Maidment. He completed his undergraduate and master's degrees at University College of North Wales, before receiving a PhD from the University of Leicester for a thesis on John Ruskin.

Maidment was a tutorial assistant at the University of Leicester from 1970 to 1972, then a lecturer in English at Aberystwyth University (1972–73) and Manchester Polytechnic (1973–90). He was then employed by Edge Hill College, finally as a professor, from 1990 to 1996. From 1993 to 2001, he was a professor of English at the University of Huddersfield. This was followed by periods as research professor in the history of print culture at the University of Salford (2001 to 2012) and then finally professor in the history of print at Liverpool John Moores University until retirement in 2018. He was president of the Research Society for Victorian Periodicals from 2018 to 2020. He died on 28 January 2025, at the age of 78.

== Publications ==
- (editor) The Poorhouse Fugitives: Self Taught Poets and Poetry in Victorian Britain (1989)
- Reading Popular Prints 1790–1870 (2001)
- Dusty Bob: A Cultural History of Dustmen, 1780–1870 (2007)
- Comedy, Caricature and the Social Order, 1820–50 (2013)
- Robert Seymour and Nineteenth-Century Print Culture: Sketches by Seymour and Comic Illustration (2021)
