= Jean-Louis Lalanne =

French footballer (1954–2025)

Personal information
- Date of birth: 12 July 1954
- Place of birth: Dax, France
- Date of death: 1 January 2025 (aged 70)
- Height: 1.75 m (5 ft 9 in)
- Position: Right-back

Senior career*
Years	Team	Apps	(Gls)
1969–1973	UA Cognac		
1973–1981	Bordeaux	73	(3)
1981–1985	Libourne	63	(6)
- * Club domestic league appearances and goals

Jean-Louis Lalanne (12 July 1954 – 1 January 2025) was a French footballer who played as a right-back. He died on 1 January 2025, at the age of 70.
