= James Nunnally (politician) =

American politician (1945–2025)

Member of the Mississippi House of Representatives for the 1st district, post 2 (1972–1976); 4th district (1976–1988)
- In office 1972–1988
- Preceded by: Leland J. Grisham
- Succeeded by: Joe Mitch McElwain

Personal details
- Born: January 15, 1945; Dumas, Mississippi, U.S.
- Died: January 6, 2025 (aged 79); Ripley, Mississippi, U.S.
- Political party: Democratic
- Spouse: Betty Jo Michael (m. 1968)
- Children: 1
- Parents: J. B. Nunnally (father); Virginia Joyce Anderson (mother)

James David Nunnally (January 15, 1945 – January 6, 2025) was an American politician from the state of Mississippi. He served as a member of the Mississippi House of Representatives from 1972 to 1988.

== Life and career ==
Nunnally was born in Dumas, Mississippi, on January 15, 1945, the son of James Bartlett and Virginia Joyce (née Anderson) Nunnally. He attended Northeast Mississippi Junior College and then the University of Mississippi, where he earned bachelor's and master's degrees in education, and he became a public school teacher.

He narrowly defeated incumbent representative Leland J. Grisham in the 1971 Democratic primary runoff. He went on to represent Northeast Mississippi in the Mississippi House of Representatives for sixteen years. In March 1987, the Supreme Court of Mississippi ruled that Nunnally, along with several other state legislators and public officials, had committed conflict of interest ethics violations by working as public school teachers while holding public office. Though he said he would end his public teaching career to continue as a state legislator, Nunnally lost the primary runoff that fall to Joe Mitch McElwain.

In 2011, he fell short in an attempt at returning to the state house seat he previously held. He took 49.6% in the first round of the Democratic primary, then lost 48%-52% to Jody Steverson, who would become a Republican after being re-elected in 2015. Nunnally died in Ripley, Mississippi on January 6, 2025, at the age of 79.

== Electoral history ==
=== 1971 ===
==== Primary election ====
Mississippi House of Representatives, District 1, Post 2, 1971 primary election * denotes incumbent Source:
Party	Candidate	Votes	%
Democratic	James Nunnally		
Democratic	Leland J. Grisham *		
Democratic	Charles Don Wilson		
Total votes			
Runoff election
Democratic	James Nunnally	5,706	51.9
Democratic	Leland J. Grisham *	5,290	48.1
Total votes		10,996	100

==== General election ====
Mississippi House of Representatives, District 1, Post 2, 1971 general election * denotes incumbent Source:
Party	Candidate	Votes	%
Democratic	James Nunnally	4,642	100
Total votes		4,642	100

=== 1975 ===
==== Primary election ====
Mississippi House of Representatives, District 4, 1975 primary election * denotes incumbent Source:
Party	Candidate	Votes	%
Democratic	James Nunnally *		
Democratic	Dwight Ward		
Democratic	?		
Total votes			
Runoff election
Democratic	James Nunnally *		
Democratic	Dwight Ward		
Total votes			

==== General election ====
Mississippi House of Representatives, District 4, 1975 general election * denotes incumbent Source:
Party	Candidate	Votes	%
Democratic	James Nunnally *		100
Total votes			100

=== 1979 ===
==== Primary election ====
Mississippi House of Representatives, District 4, 1979 primary election * denotes incumbent Source:
Party	Candidate	Votes	%
Democratic	James Nunnally *	6,353	61.0
Democratic	F. L. Rowell	4,061	39.0
Total votes		10,414	100

==== General election ====
Mississippi House of Representatives, District 4, 1979 general election * denotes incumbent Source:
Party	Candidate	Votes	%
Democratic	James Nunnally *	2,992	100
Total votes		2,992	100

=== 1983 ===
==== Primary election ====
Mississippi House of Representatives, District 4, 1983 primary election * denotes incumbent Source:
Party	Candidate	Votes	%
Democratic	James Nunnally *		
Total votes			

==== General election ====
Mississippi House of Representatives, District 4, 1983 general election * denotes incumbent Source:
Party	Candidate	Votes	%
Democratic	James Nunnally *		
Total votes			

=== 1987 ===
==== Primary election ====
Mississippi House of Representatives, District 4, 1987 primary election * denotes incumbent Source:
Party	Candidate	Votes	%
Democratic	James Nunnally *		
Democratic	Joe Mitch McElwain		
Democratic	Huddleston		
Total votes			
Runoff election
Democratic	Joe Mitch McElwain	6,452	60.0
Democratic	James Nunnally *	4,303	40.0
Total votes		10,755	100

=== 2011 ===
==== Primary election ====
Mississippi House of Representatives, District 4, 2011 primary election * denotes incumbent Source:
Party	Candidate	Votes	%
Democratic	James Nunnally	3,667	49.6
Democratic	Jody Steverson	3,183	43.1
Democratic	Steve Fisher	543	7.3
Total votes		7,393	100
Runoff election
Democratic	Jody Steverson	3,491	52.0
Democratic	James Nunnally	3,218	48.0
Total votes		6,709	100
