= Andreas Stenglein =

German politician (1929–2025)

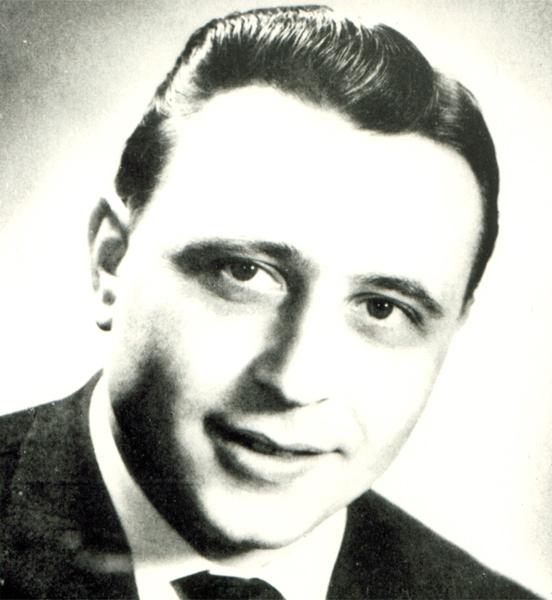
- Stenglein in 1966

Member of the Landtag of Bavaria
- In office 28 January 1963 – 20 November 1966
- In office 9 December 1958 – 25 November 1962

Personal details
- Born: 20 January 1929 Gaustadt, Bavaria, Germany
- Died: 5 January 2025 (aged 95) Gaustadt, Bavaria, Germany
- Party: SPD
- Occupation: Civil servant

Andreas Stenglein (20 January 1929 – 5 January 2025) was a German politician. A member of the Social Democratic Party, he served in the Landtag of Bavaria from 1958 to 1962 and again from 1963 to 1966.

Stenglein died in Gaustadt on 5 January 2025, at the age of 95.
