= Maria Grazia Sestero =

Italian politician (1942–2025)

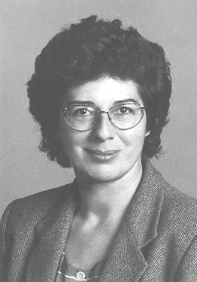

Member of the Chamber of Deputies of Italy for Torino-Novara-Vercelli
- In office 23 April 1992 – 14 April 1994

Personal details
- Born: 7 May 1942; Chiusa di San Michele, Italy
- Died: 1 January 2025 (aged 82); Turin, Italy
- Political party: PCI (until 1991); PRC (1991–1995); MCU (1995–1998); DS (1998–2007); PD (2007–2011)
- Education: University of Turin
- Occupation: Schoolteacher

Maria Grazia Sestero Gianotti (7 May 1942 – 1 January 2025) was an Italian politician. A member of the Communist Refoundation Party while in office, she served in the Chamber of Deputies from 1992 to 1994.

Grazia Sestero died in Turin on 1 January 2025, at the age of 82.
