= Jesús Pérez Varela =

Spanish politician (1949–2025)

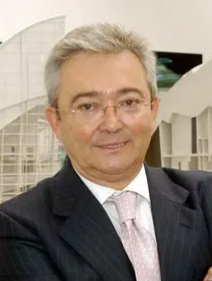

Minister of Culture and Social Communication of Galicia
- In office 1997 – 2 August 2005
- Preceded by: Víctor Manuel Vázquez Portomeñe
- Succeeded by: Ánxela Bugallo

Member of the Parliament of Galicia
- In office 1997–2001

Personal details
- Born: 19 April 1949; Redondela, Spain
- Died: 16 January 2025 (aged 75); Santiago de Compostela, Spain
- Political party: PPdeG
- Education: Escuela Oficial de Periodismo
- Occupation: Journalist

Jesús Pérez Varela (Galician: Xesús Pérez Varela; 19 April 1949 – 16 January 2025) was a Spanish politician. A member of the People's Party of Galicia, he served as Minister of Culture and Social Communication of Galicia from 1997 to 2005 and was a member of the region's parliament from 1997 to 2001.

Pérez died of cancer in Santiago de Compostela, on 16 January 2025, at the age of 75.
