= Sakkie de Klerk =

South African rugby union player

- Full name: Izak Johannes de Klerk
- Born: 28 October 1938 Calvinia, South Africa
- Died: 31 January 2025 (aged 86)
- Height: 1.95 m (6 ft 5 in)
- Weight: 103.9 kg (229 lb)

Rugby union career
- Position: Lock
International career
Years	Team	Apps	(Points)
1969–70	South Africa	3	(0)

Izak Johannes de Klerk (28 October 1938 – 31 January 2025), known as Sakkie de Klerk, was a South African international rugby union player.

Born in Calvinia, de Klerk played provincial rugby for Transvaal, Northern Transvaal and Western Province.

A lock forward, de Klerk was a member of the Springboks squad for their 1969–70 tour of Britain and Ireland. He didn't get called up until two weeks into the tour, with the team depleted by injury. After missing the opening Test match against Scotland, de Klerk made his debut in their loss to England at Twickenham, then featured in their drawn matches against Ireland and Wales. All of his Springboks caps came in partnership with lock Frik du Preez.

== See also ==
- List of South Africa national rugby union players
