= Ralf-Dieter Fischer =

German politician (1948–2025)

Member of the Hamburg Parliament
- In office 1982–1997

Personal details
- Born: 12 May 1948; Sieverstedt, Schleswig-Holstein, Germany
- Died: 19 January 2025 (aged 76)
- Political party: CDU
- Education: University of Hamburg
- Occupation: Lawyer

Ralf-Dieter Fischer (12 May 1948 – 19 January 2025) was a German politician. A member of the Christian Democratic Union, he served in the Hamburg Parliament from 1982 to 1997.

Fischer died on 19 January 2025, at the age of 76.
