= Sèmèvo Orisha Oké =

Beninese singer (1976–2025)

- Born: Hyppolite Aklamavo; 1976
- Died: 5 January 2025 (aged 48); Cotonou, Benin
- Occupation: Singer

Hyppolite Aklamavo (1976 – 5 January 2025), better known by his stage name Sèmèvo Orisha Oké, was a Beninese singer.

== Life and career ==
Born in 1976, one of Aklamavo's most notable concerts was held in Godomey.

== Death ==
Oké died in Cotonou on 5 January 2025, at the age of 48. The circumstances surrounding his death remain uncertain. Minister of Tourism, Culture and the Arts Jean-Michel Abimbola paid tribute to him following his death.
