= Urs Hochstrasser =

Swiss mathematician and science administrator (1926–2025)

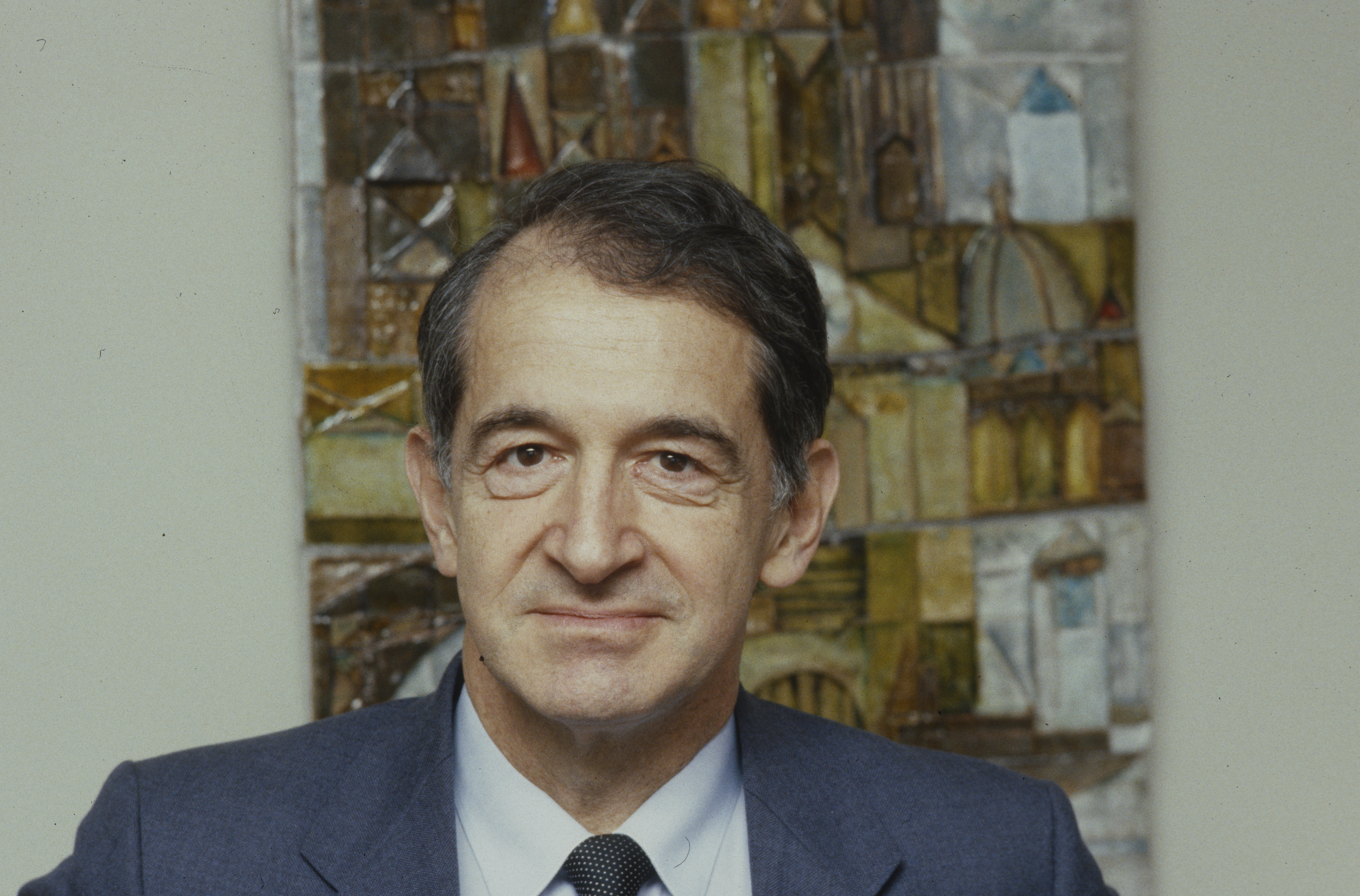
- Born: 12 January 1926; Zurich, Switzerland
- Died: 21 January 2025 (aged 99); Bern, Switzerland
- Occupations: Mathematician, physicist, science administrator
- Known for: First scientific advisor of the Swiss diplomatic service, Federal Delegate for Atomic Energy, Director of the Division of Science and Research
- Spouse: Inge Herrmann (divorced)
- Parent(s): Paul Hochstrasser (father); Margit Pók (mother)

Urs Hochstrasser (12 January 1926 – 21 January 2025) was a Swiss mathematician, physicist, and science administrator who played a significant role in shaping Switzerland's federal science policy in the late 20th century. He served as the Federal Delegate for Atomic Energy from 1961 and later as the first Director of the Division of Science and Research at the Federal Department of Home Affairs from 1969 to 1989.

== Early life and education ==
Hochstrasser was born on 12 January 1926 in Zurich, the son of Paul Hochstrasser, a civil engineer, and Margit Pók, who was of Hungarian origin. He studied mathematics and physics at the Swiss Federal Institute of Technology (ETH) in Zurich, where he obtained his doctorate in 1954.

== Academic career ==
Following his doctoral studies, Hochstrasser worked as an assistant professor in Washington, D.C. He subsequently became an extraordinary professor of mathematics at the University of Kansas and served as director of its computing center from 1957 to 1958, working in the emerging field of computer science.

Later in his career, Hochstrasser taught at ETH Zurich and, beginning in 1968, served as an honorary professor at the University of Bern.

== Diplomatic and federal service ==
In 1958, Hochstrasser became the first scientific advisor of the Swiss diplomatic service, serving in posts in Washington, D.C. and Ottawa. This position represented a new recognition of the importance of scientific expertise in diplomacy.

In 1961, the Swiss Federal Council appointed Hochstrasser as the Federal Delegate for Atomic Energy. In this capacity, he was responsible for overseeing Switzerland's nuclear energy policy during a period of significant development in the field.

== Director of the Division of Science and Research ==
In 1969, Hochstrasser was appointed Director of the newly created Division of Science and Research at the Federal Department of Home Affairs. In this role, which he held until 1989, Hochstrasser was tasked with formulating and implementing a coherent and comprehensive science policy at the federal level. His tenure coincided with a period of significant expansion and modernization of Switzerland's research infrastructure and institutions.

== Later activities and honors ==
From 1993 to 1996, Hochstrasser served as president of the Association of Swiss People's Universities. In 2002, the University of Fribourg awarded him an honorary doctorate in recognition of his contributions to Swiss science and education.

Hochstrasser died in Bern on 21 January 2025, aged 99.

== Personal life ==
Hochstrasser was married to Inge Herrmann, from whom he later divorced.

== Bibliography ==
- Festschrift zum 70. Geburtstag von Urs Hochstrasser, 1996
