= Neilton Mulim =

Brazilian politician (1962–2025)

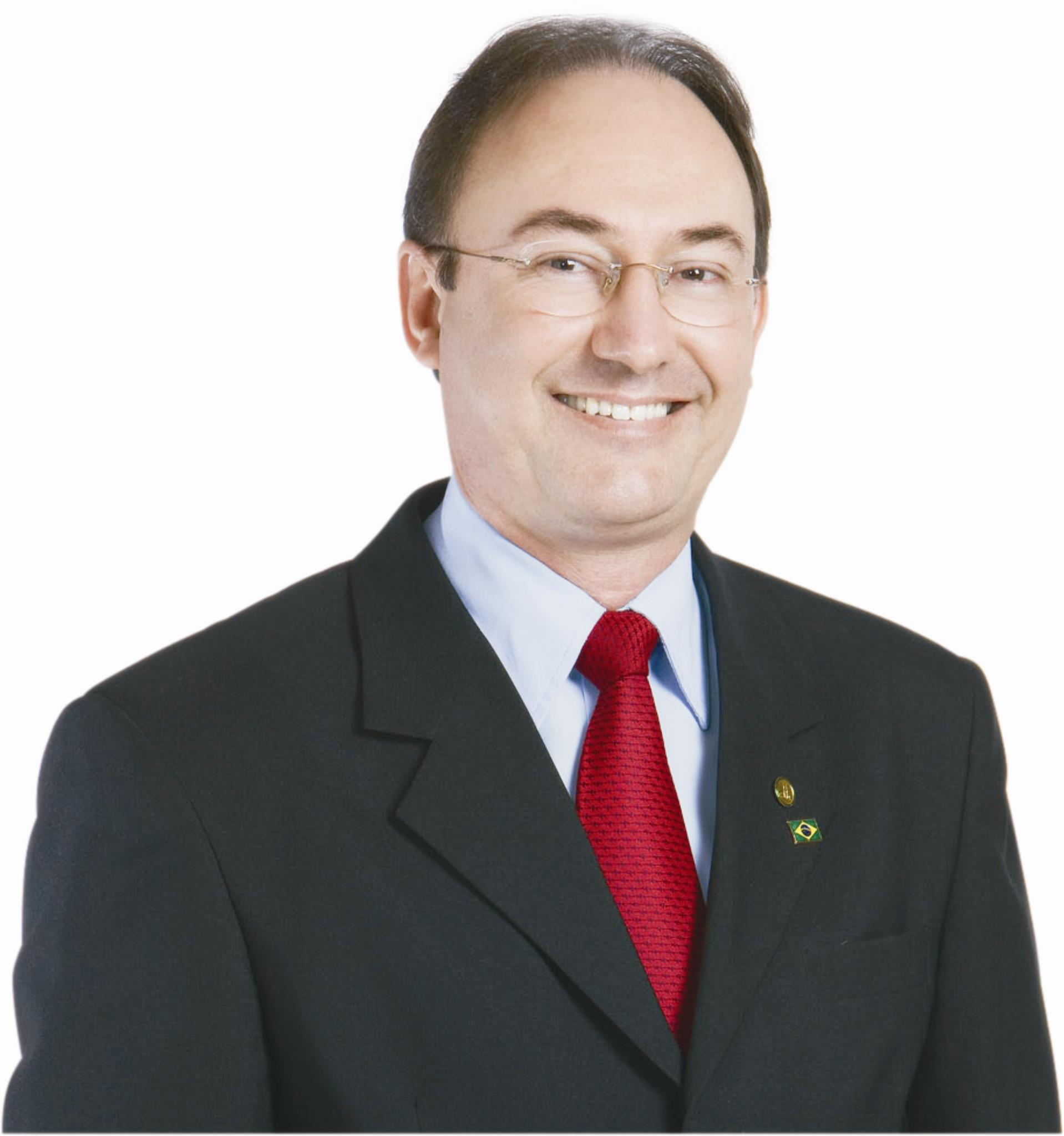
- Mulim in 2021

Mayor of São Gonçalo
- In office 1 January 2013 – 31 December 2016
- Preceded by: Aparecida Panisset
- Succeeded by: José Luiz Nanci

Member of the Chamber of Deputies of Brazil for Rio de Janeiro
- In office 1 February 2007 – 31 December 2012

Personal details
- Born: Neilton Mulim da Costa; 22 July 1962 São Gonçalo, Brazil
- Died: 23 January 2025 (aged 62) Rio de Janeiro, Brazil
- Party: PPS (2005–2007); PR/PL (2007–2025)
- Education: Rio de Janeiro State University
- Occupation: Schoolteacher

Neilton Mulim da Costa (22 July 1962 – 23 January 2025) was a Brazilian politician. A member of the Popular Socialist Party and the Party of the Republic, he served in the Chamber of Deputies from 2007 to 2012 and was mayor of São Gonçalo from 2013 to 2016.

Mulim died in Rio de Janeiro on 23 January 2025, at the age of 62.
