= Kalilou Singhateh =

Gambian politician (1934–2025)

Member of the House of Representatives of the Gambia for Lower Saloum
- In office 1962–1977

Personal details
- Born: 21 April 1934; Saba, The Gambia, The Gambia
- Died: 19 January 2025 (aged 90); Banjul, The Gambia
- Political party: PPP

Kalilou Singhateh (21 April 1934 – 19 January 2025) was a Gambian politician. A member of the People's Progressive Party, he served in the House of Representatives from 1962 to 1977.

Singhateh died in Banjul on 19 January 2025, at the age of 90.
