= Aldo Dorigo =

Italian footballer (1929–2025)

Personal information
- Date of birth: 5 August 1929
- Place of birth: Trieste, Italy
- Date of death: 15 January 2025 (aged 95)
- Place of death: Milan, Italy
- Height: 1.75 m (5 ft 9 in)
- Position: Midfielder

Senior career*
Years	Team	Apps	(Gls)
1949–1956	Triestina	92	(13)
1956–1958	Inter Milan	47	(5)
1958–1960	Alessandria	22	(4)
Total		161	(22)
- * Club domestic league appearances and goals

Aldo Dorigo (5 August 1929 – 15 January 2025) was an Italian professional footballer who made 161 appearances in Serie A playing for Triestina, Inter Milan and Alessandria. He died in Milan on 15 January 2025, at the age of 95.
