= 2025 in literature =

This article contains information about the literary events and publications of 2025.

== Anniversaries ==
- 14 January – Yukio Mishima was born in 1925 (100th Anniversary).
- 18 January – Gilles Deleuze was born in 1925 (100th Anniversary).
- 20 January – Ernesto Cardenal was born in 1925 (100th Anniversary).
- 20 January – Eugen Gomringer was born in 1925 (100th Anniversary).
- 1 February – Alfred Grosser was born in 1925 (100th Anniversary).
- 4 February – Russell Hoban was born in 1925 (100th Anniversary).
- 6 February – Pramoedya Ananta Toer was born in 1925 (100th Anniversary).
- 22 February – Edward Gorey was born in 1925 (100th Anniversary).
- 24 February – Etel Adnan was born in 1925 (100th Anniversary).
- 10 March – Manolis Anagnostakis was born in 1925 (100th Anniversary).
- 12 March – Harry Harrison was born in 1925 (100th Anniversary).
- 21 March – Peter Brook was born in 1925 (100th Anniversary).
- 25 March – Flannery O'Connor was born in 1925 (100th Anniversary).
- 11 May – Rubem Fonseca was born in 1925 (100th Anniversary).
- 27 May – Jean-Paul Aron was born in 1925 (100th Anniversary).
- 27 May – Tony Hillerman was born in 1925 (100th Anniversary).
- 6 June – Thomas Mann was born in 1875 (150th Anniversary).
- 10 June – James Salter was born in 1925 (100th Anniversary).
- 30 June – Philippe Jaccottet was born in 1925 (100th Anniversary).
- 19 July – Jean-Pierre Faye was born in 1925 (100th Anniversary).
- 20 July – Frantz Fanon was born in 1925 (100th Anniversary).
- 26 July – Ana María Matute was born in 1925 (100th Anniversary).
- 1 August – Ernst Jandl was born in 1925 (100th Anniversary).
- 18 August – Brian Aldiss was born in 1925 (100th Anniversary).
- 25 August – Thea Astley was born in 1925 (100th Anniversary).
- 27 August – Saiichi Maruya was born in 1925 (100th Anniversary).
- 6 September – Andrea Camilleri was born in 1925 (100th Anniversary).
- 15 September – Giuseppe Fava was born in 1925 (100th Anniversary).
- 19 September – Tatsuhiro Ōshiro was born in 1925 (100th Anniversary).
- 24 September – Kunio Tsuji was born in 1925 (100th Anniversary).
- 3 October – Gore Vidal was born in 1925 (100th Anniversary).
- 11 October – Elmore Leonard was born in 1925 (100th Anniversary).
- 13 October – Frank D. Gilroy was born in 1925 (100th Anniversary).
- 20 October – Art Buchwald was born in 1925 (100th Anniversary).
- 2 November – Pier Paolo Pasolini was murdered in 1975 (50th Anniversary).
- 14 November – Jean Paul died in 1825 (200th Anniversary).
- 4 December
  - Rainer Maria Rilke was born in 1875 (150th Anniversary).
  - Hannah Arendt died in 1975 (50th Anniversary).
- 5 December – E. Marlitt was born in 1825 (200th Anniversary).
- 7 December – Thornton Wilder died in 1975 (50th Anniversary).
- 8 December – Carmen Martín Gaite was born in 1925 (100th Anniversary).
- 12 December – Ahmad Shamlou was born in 1925 (100th Anniversary).
- 16 December – Jane Austen was born in 1775 (250th Anniversary).
- 19 December
  - Tankred Dorst was born in 1925 (100th Anniversary).
  - Brandon Sanderson was born in 1975 (50th Anniversary).
- 21 December – Giovanni Boccaccio died in 1375 (650th Anniversary).

== New books ==
Dates after each title indicate U.S. publication, unless otherwise indicated.

=== Fiction ===
New adult fiction, sorted by date of publication
Author	Title	Date of pub.	Ref.
Aria Aber	Good Girl	January 14	
Chimamanda Ngozi Adichie	Dream Count	March 4	
Amal El-Mohtar	The River Has Roots	March 4	
David Szalay	Flesh	March 11	
Suzanne Collins	Sunrise on the Reaping	March 18	
Abdulrazak Gurnah	Theft	March 18	
Ben Okri	Madame Sosostris and the Festival for the Brokenhearted	March 18	
John Scalzi	When the Moon Hits Your Eye	March 25	
Lindsey Davis	There Will Be Bodies	April 3	
Katie Kitamura	Audition	April 8	
Virginia Evans	The Correspondent	April 29	
Isabel Allende	My Name Is Emilia del Valle	May 6	
Ocean Vuong	The Emperor of Gladness	May 13	
Jessie Elland	The Ladie Upstairs	May 22	
Stephen King	Never Flinch	May 27	
Katie Yee	Maggie; Or, a Man and a Woman Walk Into a Bar	July 22	
Ian McEwan	What We Can Know	September 18	
Helen DeWitt and Ilya Gridneff	Your Name Here	September 23	
Lily King	Heart the Lover	October 7	
Salman Rushdie	The Eleventh Hour: A Quintet of Stories	November 4	

=== Children and young adults ===
New nonfiction, sorted by date of publication
Author	Title	Date of pub.	Ref.
Stephen King illus. by Maurice Sendak	Hansel and Gretel	February 2	
Jacqueline Wilson, illus. by Rachael Dean	The Seaside Sleepover	March 27	
Rick Riordan and Mark Oshiro	The Court of the Dead	September 23	
ND Stevenson	Scarlet Morning	September 23	
Charlie Mackesy	Always Remember: The Boy, the Mole, the Fox, the Horse and the Storm	October 14	
Jeff Kinney	Diary of a Wimpy Kid: Partypooper	October 21	

=== Poetry ===
New poetry, sorted by date of publication
Author	Title	Date of pub.	Ref.
Esther Lin	Cold Thief Place	March 11	
Sylee Gore	Maximum Summer	March 24	
Arthur Sze	Into the Hush	April 1	
Yuki Tanaka	Chronicle of Drifting	April 15	
Cathy Linh Che	Becoming Ghost	April 29	
Richard Siken	I Do Know Some Things	August 26	
Natalie Shapero	Stay Dead	September 9	
Matthew McConaughey	Poems & Prayers	September 16	
Patricia Smith	The Intentions of Thunder	September 30	
Evelyn Araluen	The Rot	November 4	
Ally Ang	Let the Moon Wobble	November 11	

=== Translations ===
Notable translations first published in English:

New translations, sorted by date of publication
Author	Translator(s)	Title	Date of pub.	Ref.
Chaim Grade	Rose Waldman	Sons and Daughters	March 25	
Solvej Balle	Sophia Hersi Smith and Jennifer Russell	On the Calculation of Volume vol. III	November 18	

=== Nonfiction ===
New nonfiction, sorted by date of publication
Author	Title	Date of pub.	Ref.
Michael Wolff	All or Nothing	February 25	
Ezra Klein and Derek Thompson	Abundance	March 18	
Andrea Long Chu	Authority: Essays	April 8	
Tim Bouverie	Allies at War	April 17	
David Zweig	An Abundance of Caution: American Schools, the Virus, and a Story of Bad Decisions	April 22	
Monica Feria Tinta	A Barrister for the Earth	April 24	
Duncan Barrett and Nuala Calvi	Blitz Kids: True Stories from the Children of Wartime Britain	April 24	
Patrick McGee	Apple in China	May 13	
Eli Erlick	Before Gender: Lost Stories from Trans History, 1850–1950	May 27	
Josh Dawsey, Tyler Pager, and Isaac Arnsdorf	2024: How Trump Retook the White House and the Democrats Lost America	July 8	
Adam Aleksic	Algospeak: How Social Media Is Transforming the Future of Language	July 15	
Jennifer Dasal	The Club: Where American Women Artists Found Refuge in Belle Époque Paris	July 15	
Dan Wang	Breakneck: China's Quest to Engineer the Future	August 26	
Eliezer Yudkowsky and Nate Soares	If Anyone Builds It, Everyone Dies	September 16	
Randi Weingarten	Why Fascists Fear Teachers: Public Education and the Future of Democracy	September 16	
Lyse Doucet	The Finest Hotel in Kabul: A People's History of Afghanistan	September 18	
Philippe Sands	38 Londres Street	October 7	

=== Biography and memoirs ===
New biographies and memoirs, sorted by date of publication
Author	Title	Date of pub.	Ref.
Pico Iyer	Aflame: Learning from Silence	January 14	
Ibrahim Babangida	A Journey in Service	February 20	
Helen Garner	How to end a story: collected diaries, 1978–1998	March 13	
Jacinda Ardern	A Different Kind of Power	June 3	
Nicholas Boggs	Baldwin: A Love Story	August 19	
Eric Schmitt	Last Line of Defense: How to Beat the Left in Court	August 19	
Miriam Toews	A Truce That Is Not Peace	August 26	
Joe Manchin	Dead Center: In Defense of Common Sense	September 16	
Kamala Harris	107 Days	September 23	
John Kennedy	How to Test Negative for Stupid: And Why Washington Never Will	October 7	
Eric Trump	Under Siege: My Family's Fight to Save Our Nation	October 14	
Margaret Atwood	Book of Lives: A Memoir of Sorts	November 4	
Patti Smith	Bread of Angels: A Memoir	November 4	
John Fetterman	Unfettered	November 11	
Dick Van Dyke	100 Rules for Living to 100	November 18	
Olivia Nuzzi	American Canto	December 2	

== Deaths ==
2025 deaths, sorted by date of death
Individual	Background	Date of death	Age	Cause of death	Ref.
David Lodge	British author and critic (Small World: An Academic Romance, Changing Places, The Picturegoers)	January 1	89		
Joseph Monninger	American novelist and academic (The Letters)	January 1	71	lung cancer.	
Tidiane Diakité	Malian-born French historian and academic	January 2	80		
Noreen Riols	British novelist and essayist	January 2	98		
Howard Buten	American author and clown	January 3	74		
Andrew Pyper	Canadian novelist	January 3	56	Cancer	
Peter Schaap	Dutch singer-songwriter and author	January 3	78		
José Claer	Canadian novelist and poet	January 4	61		
Richard Foreman	American playwright (Rhoda in Potatoland)	January 4	87	pneumonia	
Na D'Souza	Indian novelist and short story writer	January 5	87		
Lee Hoesung	Japanese-South Korean novelist	January 5	89		
František Šmahel	Czech historian and academic	January 5	90		
Henry Beissel	Canadian poet, playwright and editor	January 9	95		
Mukhtar Magauin	Kazakh writer, translator and publicist	January 9	84		
Stephan Krasovitsky	Russian poet, translator, and priest	January 10	89		
Keith Dewhurst	English playwright and scriptwriter	January 11	93		
Paul Benacerraf	French-American philosopher	January 13	94		
André Sollie	Belgian author and illustrator	January 13	77		
Kjell Gjerseth	Norwegian novelist and journalist	January 14	78		
Li Kuei-hsien	Taiwanese poet and translator	January 15	87		
Geneviève Callerot	French novelist and resistance fighter	January 16	108		
Howard Andrew Jones	American author and editor	January 16	56	brain cancer	
Ridley Wills II	American author and historian	January 16	90		
Jules Feiffer	American cartoonist, playwright (Knock Knock), and screenwriter (Popeye, Munro), Pulitzer Prize winner (1986)	January 17	95	heart failure	
Kulanthai Shanmugalingam	Sri Lankan playwright	January 17	93		
Don Cupitt	English philosopher	January 18	90		
Jalal Matini	Iranian writer and scholar	January 19	96		
Michael Longley	Northern Irish poet (The Weather in Japan)	January 22	85	complications from surgery	
Tabish Mehdi	Indian poet and literary critic	January 22	73		
Esther Jansma	Dutch writer and poet	January 23	66	cancer	
Joseph A. Amato	American historian and writer	January 24	86		
Suzanne Massie	American historian and academic	January 26	94		
Maung Khin Min	Burmese writer and linguist	January 27	83		
Marina Colasanti	Italian-Brazilian writer, translator and journalist	January 28	87		
Mahmoud Saeed	Iraqi-born American novelist and short story writer	January 28	86		
Tom Robbins	American novelist	February 9	92		
Antonine Maillet	Canadian novelist and playwright	February 17	95		
Joseph Wambaugh	American novelist	February 28	88	esophageal cancer	
Alex Wheatle	British novelist	March 16	62	prostate cancer	
Denise Boucher	Canadian poet and playwright	March 18	89		
Alastair Niven	British literary scholar and author	March 26	81		
Mario Vargas Llosa	Peruvian novelist, Nobel Prize laureate (2010)	April 13	89		
Judith Copithorne	Canadian poet and playwright	May 15	85		
Edmund White	American novelist	June 3	85		
Victor-Lévy Beaulieu	Canadian playwright	June 9	79		
Denys Chabot	Canadian novelist and journalist	June 24	80		
Anne Walmsley	British editor, scholar, critic and author	July 12	93		

== Awards ==
2025 literary award winners, sorted alphabetically by award
Award	Category	Author	Title	Ref.
Amazon.ca First Novel Award		Valérie Bah	Subterrane	
Booker Prize		David Szalay	Flesh	
Bookseller/Diagram Prize for Oddest Title of the Year		Matthew Purvis	The Pornographic Delicatessen: Midcentury Montréal's Erotic Art, Media, and Spaces	
British Book Awards	Overall Book of the Year	Alexei Navalny	Patriot	
British Book Awards	Author of the Year	Percival Everett		
British Book Awards	Illustrator of the Year	Rob Biddulph		
British Book Awards	Fiction	Percival Everett	James	
British Book Awards	Crime & Thriller	Abir Mukherjee	Hunted	
British Book Awards	Debut Fiction	Asako Yuzuki	Butter	
British Book Awards	Non-Fiction: Narrative	Alexei Navalny	Patriot	
British Book Awards	Non-Fiction: Lifestyle & Illustrated	Stanley Tucci	What I Ate in One Year	
British Book Awards	Discover	Len Pennie	poyums	
British Book Awards	Pageturner	Saara El-Arifi	Faebound	
British Book Awards	Children's Fiction	Jeff Kinney	Diary of a Wimpy Kid: Hot Mess	
British Book Awards	Children's Illustrated	Julia Donaldson, illus. by Axel Scheffler	Jonty Gentoo: The Adventures of a Penguin	
British Book Awards	Children's Non-Fiction	Isabella Tree, illus. by Angela Harding	Wilding: How to Bring Wildlife Back	
British Book Awards	Audiobook Fiction	Jamie Smart, narrated by Ciaran Saward	Bunny vs. Monkey	
British Book Awards	Audiobook Fiction	Marian Keyes	My Favourite Mistake	
British Book Awards	Audiobook Non-Fiction	Patric Gagne	Sociopath	
British Book Awards	Freedom to Publish	Margaret Atwood		
Carol Shields Prize for Fiction		Canisia Lubrin	Code Noir	
Dublin Literary Award		Michael Crummey	The Adversary	
Dylan Thomas Prize		Yasmin Zaher	The Coin	
Edgar Awards	Robert L. Fish Memorial Award	Anna Stolley Persky	"The Jews on Elm Street"	
Edgar Awards	Lilian Jackson Braun Award	Katarina Bivald	The Murders in Great Diddling	
Edgar Awards	G. P. Putnam's Sons Sue Grafton Memorial Award	Jacqueline Winspear	The Comfort of Ghosts	
Edgar Awards	Grand Master Award	Laura Lippman		
Edgar Awards	Grand Master Award	John Sandford		
Edgar Awards	Raven Award	Face in a Book Bookstore		
Edgar Awards	Ellery Queen Award	Peter Wolverton	St. Martin’s Press	
Edgar Awards	Simon & Schuster Mary Higgins Clark Award	Sulari Gentill	The Mystery Writer	
Edgar Awards	Best Novel	Charlotte Vassell	The In Crowd	
Edgar Awards	Best First Novel by an American Author	Henry Wise	Holy City	
Edgar Awards	Best Paperback Original	Kimberly Belle	The Paris Widow	
Edgar Awards	Best Fact Crime	Steven Johnson	The Infernal Machine: A True Story of Dynamite, Terror, and the Rise of the Modern Detective	
Edgar Awards	Best Critical/Biographical	Nathan Ashman	James Sallis: A Companion to the Mystery Fiction	
Edgar Awards	Best Short Story	Erika Krouse	"Eat My Moose"	
Edgar Awards	Best Juvenile	Margaret Peterson Haddix	Mysteries of Trash and Treasure: The Stolen Key	
Edgar Awards	Best Young Adult	Natalie D. Richards	49 Miles Alone	
Edna Staebler Award		Aaron Williams	The Last Logging Show: A Forestry Family at the End of an Era	
Giller Prize		Souvankham Thammavongsa	Pick a Colour	
Gotham Book Prize		Nicole Gelinas	Movement: New York’s Long War to Take Back Its Streets from the Car	
Gotham Book Prize		Ian Frazier	Paradise Bronx: The Life and Times of New York’s Greatest Borough	
Governor General's Awards	English Fiction	Kyle Edwards	Small Ceremonies	
Governor General's Awards	English Non-Fiction	Claire Cameron	How to Survive a Bear Attack	
Governor General's Awards	English Poetry	Karen Solie	Wellwater	
Governor General's Awards	English Drama	Tara Beagan	Rise, Red River	
Governor General's Awards	English Children's Literature	Heather Smith	Tig	
Governor General's Awards	English Children's Illustration	Tonya Simpson, Delreé Dumont	This Land Is a Lullaby	
Governor General's Awards	French to English Translation	Jessica Moore	Uiesh/Somewhere	
Governor General's Awards	French Fiction	Katia Belkhodja	Les déterrées	
Governor General's Awards	French Non-Fiction	Ouanessa Younsi	Soigner, écrire	
Governor General's Awards	French Poetry	Paul Chanel Malenfant	Au passage du fleuve	
Governor General's Awards	French Drama	Éric Noël	Ces regards amoureux de garçons altérés	
Governor General's Awards	French Children's literature	Laurie Léveillé	Coup bas	
Governor General's Awards	French Children's illustration	Stéphane Laporte, Jacques Goldstyn	Un cadeau de Noël en novembre	
Governor General's Awards	English to French translation	Sylvie Bérard, Suzanne Grenier	Les soeurs de la Muée	
International Booker Prize		Banu Mushtaq, trans. by Deepa Bhasthi	Heart Lamp: Selected Stories (ಎದೆಯ ಹಣತೆ)	
League of Canadian Poets	Gerald Lampert Award	Marc Perez	Dayo	
League of Canadian Poets	Pat Lowther Award	Bren Simmers	The Work	
League of Canadian Poets	Raymond Souster Award	Chimwemwe Undi	Scientific Marvel	
Locus Award	Science Fiction Novel	Alexander Boldizar	The Man Who Saw Seconds	
Locus Award	Fantasy Novel	T. Kingfisher	A Sorceress Comes to Call	
Locus Award	Young Adult Book	Yoon Ha Lee	Moonstorm	
Locus Award	Novella	T. Kingfisher	What Feasts at Night	
Locus Award	Short Story	Isabel J. Kim	"Why Don't We Just Kill the Kid in the Omelas Hole"	
Los Angeles Times Book Prize	Art Seidenbaum Award for First Fiction	Justin Haynes	Ibis: A Novel	
Los Angeles Times Book Prize	Biography	Ekow Eshun	The Strangers: Five Extraordinary Black Men and the Worlds That Made Them	
Los Angeles Times Book Prize	Christopher Isherwood Prize for Autobiographical Prose	Adam Ross	Playworld: A Novel	
Los Angeles Times Book Prize	Current Interest	Brian Goldstone	There Is No Place for Us: Working and Homeless in America	
Los Angeles Times Book Prize	Fiction	Bryan Washington	Palaver: A Novel	
Los Angeles Times Book Prize	Graphic Novel/Comics	Jaime Hernandez	Life Drawing: A Love and Rockets Collection	
Los Angeles Times Book Prize	History	Bench Ansfield	Born in Flames: The Business of Arson and the Remaking of the American City	
Los Angeles Times Book Prize	Mystery/Thriller	Megan Abbott	El Dorado Drive	
Los Angeles Times Book Prize	Poetry	Allison Benis White	A Magnificent Loneliness	
Los Angeles Times Book Prize	Science Fiction, Fantasy, and Speculative Fiction	Silvia Park	Luminous	
Los Angeles Times Book Prize	Science and Technology	Karen Hao	Empire of AI: Dreams and Nightmares in Sam Altman’s OpenAI	
Los Angeles Times Book Prize	Young Adult Literature	Trung Le Nguyen	Angelica and the Bear Prince	
Los Angeles Times Book Prize	Innovator's Award	We Need Diverse Books		
Los Angeles Times Book Prize	Robert Kirsch Award	Amy Tan		
National Book Awards	Fiction	Rabih Alameddine	The True True Story of Raja the Gullible (and His Mother)	
National Book Awards	Nonfiction	Omar El Akkad	One Day, Everyone Will Have Always Been Against This	
National Book Awards	Poetry	Patricia Smith	The Intentions of Thunder: New and Selected Poems	
National Book Awards	Translated Literature	Gabriela Cabezón Cámara	We Are Green and Trembling	
National Book Awards	Young People's Literature	Daniel Nayeri	The Teacher of Nomad Land	
National Book Critics Circle Award	Biography	Alex Green	A Perfect Turmoil: Walter E. Fernald and the Struggle to Care for America’s Disabled	
National Book Critics Circle Award	Criticism	Quinn Slobodian	Hayek’s Bastards: Race, Gold, IQ, and the Capitalism of the Far Right	
National Book Critics Circle Award	Fiction	Han Kang with e. yaewon and Paige Aniyah Morris (trans.)	We Do Not Part	
National Book Critics Circle Award	Memoir and Autobiography	Arundhati Roy	Mother Mary Comes to Me	
National Book Critics Circle Award	Nonfiction	Karen Hao	Empire of AI: Dreams and Nightmares in Sam Altman’s OpenAI	
National Book Critics Circle Award	Poetry	Kevin Young	Night Watch	
National Book Critics Circle Award	Gregg Barrios Book in Translation Prize	Neige Sinno, trans. by Natasha Lehrer	Sad Tiger	
National Book Critics Circle Award	John Leonard Prize	Nicholas Boggs	Baldwin: A Love Story	
National Book Critics Circle Award	Nona Balakian Citation for Excellence in Reviewing	Rhoda Feng		
Pulitzer Prize	Biography	Jason Roberts	Every Living Thing: The Great and Deadly Race to Know All Life	
Pulitzer Prize	Drama	Branden Jacobs-Jenkins	Purpose	
Pulitzer Prize	Fiction	Percival Everett	James	
Pulitzer Prize	General Nonfiction	Benjamin Nathans	To the Success of Our Hopeless Cause: The Many Lives of the Soviet Dissident Movement	
Pulitzer Prize	History	Kathleen DuVal	Native Nations: A Millennium in North America	
Pulitzer Prize	History	Edda L. Fields-Black	Combee: Harriet Tubman, the Combahee River Raid, and Black Freedom During the Civil War	
Pulitzer Prize	Memoir or Autobiography	Tessa Hulls	Feeding Ghosts: A Graphic Memoir	
Pulitzer Prize	Poetry	Marie Howe	New and Selected Poems	
Purdy Poetry Prize		A. F. Moritz	Great Silent Ballad	
Stephen Leacock Memorial Medal for Humour		Natalie Sue	I Hope This Finds You Well	
Trillium Book Award	English Prose	Maurice Vellekoop	I'm So Glad We Had This Time Together	
Trillium Book Award	English Poetry	Jake Byrne	DADDY	
Trillium Book Award	French Prose	Aristote Kavungu	Céline au Congo	
Trillium Book Award	French Poetry or Children's	Mireille Messier	Le bonnet magique	
Writers' Trust of Canada	Atwood Gibson Writers' Trust Fiction Prize	Maria Reva	Endling	
Writers' Trust of Canada	Hilary Weston Writers' Trust Prize for Nonfiction	Leanne Betasamosake Simpson	Theory of Water	
Writers' Trust of Canada	Dayne Ogilvie Prize	Roza Nozari	All the Parts We Exile	
Writers' Trust of Canada	Latner Griffin Writers' Trust Poetry Prize	Bren Simmers		
Writers' Trust of Canada	Matt Cohen Award	Sheree Fitch		
Writers' Trust of Canada	Vicky Metcalf Award for Literature for Young People	Julie Flett		
Writers' Trust of Canada	Writers' Trust Engel/Findley Award	Kim Thúy		
Writers' Trust of Canada	Shaughnessy Cohen Prize for Political Writing	Raymond B. Blake	Canada's Prime Ministers and the Shaping of a National Identity	
Writers' Trust of Canada	Balsillie Prize for Public Policy	Vince Beiser	Power Metal: The Race for the Resources That Will Shape the Future	
Writers' Trust of Canada	RBC Bronwen Wallace Award for Emerging Writers, Poetry	Dora Prieto	"Loose Threads"	
Writers' Trust of Canada	RBC Bronwen Wallace Award for Emerging Writers, Short Fiction	Jess Goldman	"Tombstone of a Tsaddik"	
Writers' Trust of Canada	RBC Bronwen Wallace Award for Emerging Writers, Creative Non-fiction	Phillip Dwight Morgan	"White Trucks and Mergansers"	

== Notable new movies and TV series based on books ==
Below are some of the most prominent film and television productions expected to premiere/broadcast during 2025:

Title	The book on which the movie/TV series is based	Type	Genre	Premiere date	Distribution company / original broadcasting network
"Dog Man"	"Dog Man" by Dav Pilkey	Movie	Superhero film, comedy	January 15, 2025	Universal Pictures
"The Monkey"	"The Monkey" by Stephen King	Movie	Comedy, horror	February 21, 2025	Neon
"Mickey 17"	"Mickey7" by Edward Ashton	Movie	Science fiction	March 7, 2025	Warner Bros.
"Snow White"	"Snow White" by the Brothers Grimm	Movie	Musical, Fantasy	March 21, 2025	Walt Disney
"The Bad Guys 2"	"The Bad Guys" by Aaron Blabey	Movie	Animation, Heist film, comedy	August 1, 2025	Universal Pictures
"Freakier Friday"	"Freaky Friday" by Mary Rodgers	Movie	Comic fantasy	August 8, 2025	Walt Disney
"Fear Street: Prom Queen"	"The Prom Queen" by R. L. Stine	Movie	Horror	TBD	Netflix
"The Running Man"	"The Running Man" by Stephen King	Movie	Science fiction, action	November 7, 2025	Paramount Pictures
The Dead Girls	Las muertas by Jorge Ibargüengoitia	Limited TV series	Drama	September 2025	Netflix
