= 2025 in poetry =

This article covers 2025 in poetry.

== Events ==
- April 24–27: The Rio Grande Valley International Poetry Conference occurred in McAllen, Texas, U.S.
- May 27–30: The Poetry by the Sea conference occurred in Madison, Connecticut, U.S.
- June 12–15: The 55th Poetry International Festival occurred in Rotterdam, the Netherlands.
- August 16: The first Hugo Award for Best Poem is presented at Seattle Worldcon 2025

== Selection of works published in English ==
- Yuki Tanaka: Chronicle of Drifting
- Richard Siken: I Do Know Some Things
- Sylee Gore: Maximum Summer
- Matthew McConaughey: Poems & Prayers

== Awards ==
- Hugo Award for Best Poem

Marie Brennan, for "A War of Words"

- Rhysling Awards

Mary Soon Lee, for "The Blackthorn" (long form), and F.J. Bergmann, for "Lost Ark" (short form)

- Dwarf Stars Award

Pedro Iniguez, for "Perish and Live Forever".

- Elgin Awards

Pedro Iniguez, for Mexicans on the Moon (book) and Katherine Quevedo, for "The Inca Weaver’s Tales" (Chapbook).

== Deaths ==
- January 8 – Pritish Nandy (born 1951), Indian poet, film director and politician
- January 15 – Li Kuei-hsien (born 1937), Taiwanese poet
- January 22
  - Michael Longley (born 1939), Northern Irish poet
  - Tabish Mehdi (born 1951), Indian poet and critic
- July 14 – Andrea Gibson (born 1975), American poet
- July 19 – Soltan Abbas (born 1933), Azerbaijani poet
- July 20 – Urszula Kozioł (born 1931), Polish poet and novelist
- August 27 – Charmaine Papertalk Green (born 1962), Indigenous Australian poet and artist
- September 26 – Tony Harrison (born 1937), English poet
- September 29 – Brian Patten (born 1946), English poet

== See also ==
- List of years in poetry
