= Wang Dan =

Wang Dan is the name of:

- Wang Dan (Song dynasty) (957–1017), Song dynasty grand councilor
- Wang Dan (dissident) (born 1969), Chinese dissident and student leader in the 1989 Tiananmen Square Protest
- Wang Dan (triathlete) (born 1980), Chinese triathlete
- Wang Dan (swimmer) (born 1984), Chinese swimmer
- Wang Dan (play), a 2014 Hong Kong play

== See also ==
- Dan Wang, Canadian technology analyst and writer
- Wangdan, a township in Bainang County, Tibet, China
- Daniel Wang (disambiguation)
