= Breakneck =

Breakneck is an English adjective meaning dangerous or reckless. It may refer to:

- Breakneck Creek, a tributary of Connoquenessing Creek in western Pennsylvania
- Breakneck Hill, in Allegany County, Maryland
- Breakneck Ridge, a mountain along the Hudson River, New York
- Breakneck Ridge (Metro-North station), a station on the Metro-North Railroad in New York State
- Breakneck (video game) or N.I.C.E. 2, a 1998 video game
- Breakneck: China's Quest to Engineer the Future, a 2025 book by Dan Wang

== See also ==
- "Break Ya Neck", a single by American rapper Busta Rhymes from his 2001 album Genesis
