= Soros: The World's Most Influential Investor =

1996 book by Robert Slater

- 2009 edition cover
- Author: Robert Slater
- Cover artist: Anthony Landi, photographer James Leynse
- Language: English
- Subject: The life, work, and philanthropy of George Soros
- Genre: Nonfiction
- Publisher: McGraw Hill
- Publication date: First edition, 1996
- Publication place: New York, USA
- Media type: Print (hardback), paperback
- Pages: 335 (with notes and index)
- ISBN: 978-0-07-160844-2

Soros: The World's Most Influential Investor is a non-fiction book by Robert Slater, first released by McGraw Hill in 1996, that describes the early life, education, work, and philanthropy of a man many consider to be the most influential and successful investor of the twentieth century.

== Content ==
In the 1980s Soros ardently strived to expand the wealth of his Quantum Fund which he in turn used to finance his efforts to bring down Communism and establish Open Societies in those Eastern European countries still feeling the effects of stagnant economies and repressive leadership. The fund gained international attention following its profits during the United Kingdom’s 1992 currency crisis, after which Soros was described as “the man who broke the Bank of England."

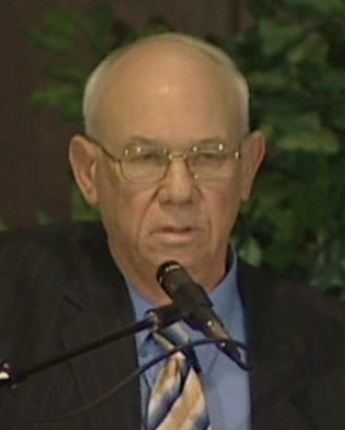
Slater in 2015

Though not officially an authorized biography, for this updated 2009 edition Slater did several interviews with Soros, Open Society Foundations Board members, business associates, and friends, and opened the book to edits by Soros and his close associates. Slater had written biographies of other great financial successes and CEOs, and like Soros, was a graduate of the London School of Economics (LSE). His book traces Soros's life from his boyhood in Budapest, his flight from the Gestapo, his emigration to London around the age of seventeen where he waited tables and worked as a lifeguard, his time at the LSE, and finally his extraordinary success as a hedge fund operator and global philanthropist after his arrival in America.

=== Successful macroeconomic approach ===
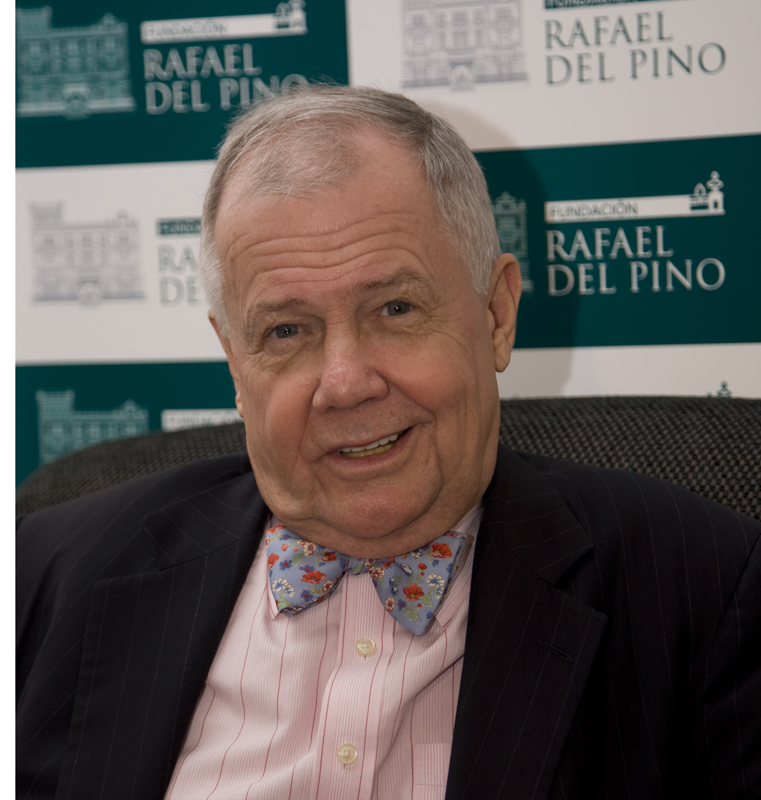
Jim Rogers in 2010

From 1970 to 1980, Soros Fund Management gained 4200% while the S&P advanced about 47%. Prior to 1979, Soros's hedge fund was named the Double Eagle Fund, and then the Soros Fund, part of Soros Fund Management founded in 1969 with Jim Rogers. The Quantum Fund, begun in 1979, was one of the first truly global funds. In 1980, the Soros fund had an incredible year, with an increase of 102.6 percent and a net worth of $381 million, putting Soros's worth at about $100 million. Little known, even in mid-career, on May 28, 1975, the Wall Street Journal ran an article on Soros, which included the headline "Bucking Trends: Securities Fund Shuns Wall Street's Fashions, Prospers in Hard Years...". The article focused on Soros's success as a maverick, noting that he and his partner, Jim Rogers "had a knack for buying stocks before they came into vogue and unloading them at the peak of their popularity. They generally ignored stocks widely held by the major mutual funds, bank trust departments, and other institutions--except as short-sale opportunities". What Slater is telling us, and what top investors knew early was that Soros was a little brighter, had a broader insight into markets, and did a broader and more thorough analysis of global market conditions including government financial regulation than most of the better analysts. And what he would prove in years to come was that, with greater knowledge and experience, he could at times take greater risks, and reap greater rewards than other hedge fund managers. Soros hated the spotlight brought by the press at this stage in his career, and would only cautiously and hesitantly seek it when he later sought support for his philanthropic efforts, or needed to mitigate the impact of losses which might hurt the confidence of his clients, or divert public sentiment from his desire to address global issues.

=== Criticism for shorting companies ===
As Slater importantly noted, Soros has probably taken the most criticism for shorting companies, which in simple terms means acquiring and then selling their securities before their value diminishes. One of his largest shorts early in his career was against Western Union around 1985. Soros noted the company held a lot of depreciated Telex equipment in its inventory. Fax machines, already widely in use, could wire information and cash, formerly the company's chief function, more quickly and less expensively than Telex machines. Soros knew that the company held a lot of debt, which led him to conclude the company stock price was overvalued. Soros Funds successfully bought and sold around a million shares, making them a profit in the millions, but many of course associated Soros's gains with Western Union's corporate losses, though the company is still viable today.

=== Black Wednesday ===
Slater's book provides insights into many of Soros's greatest financial successes paying particular attention to "Black Wednesday" when Soros shorted the English Pound, acquiring roughly 10 billion dollars in the currency in the two weeks prior to September 16, 1992, with the help of $3 billion in loans and the capital provided by other Soros Fund Investors. He then converted most of the $10 billion pounds into German Marks which would hold steady in value against the Pound. Eventually the Pound's value dropped roughly 10–20% on Black Wednesday, September 16, when it was re-evaluated against the Mark. Soros claimed that his holdings in the Soros Financial Fund, and more specifically his Quantum Fund, had profited roughly one billion dollars in the transaction. Soros has been widely criticized for the move, which some economists believe damaged the British economy, but the British Gross National Product recovered steadily and Soros poured nearly all the money into his philanthropy, primarily in Russia, where he made significant gains.

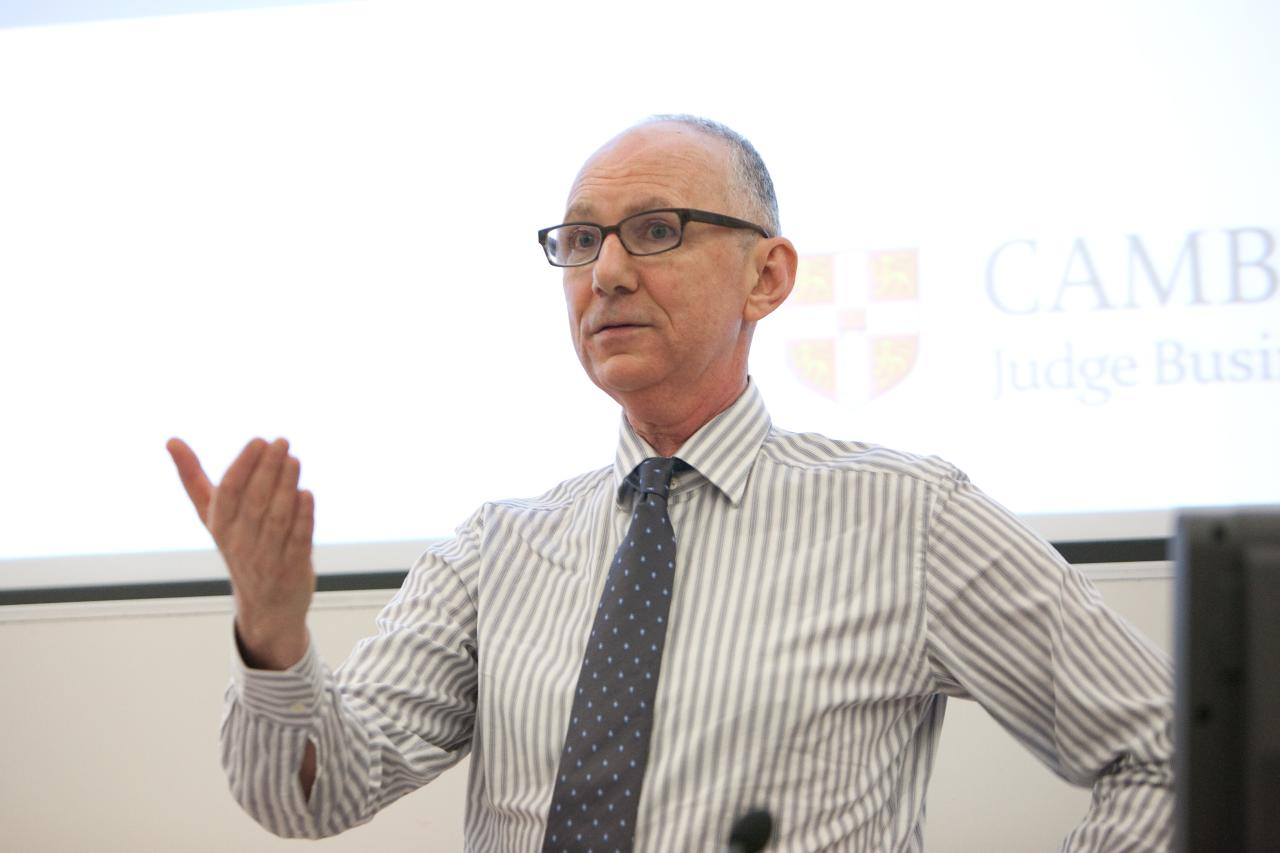
Kaletsky in 2010

Anatole Kaletsky, a British economist and journalist, at Soros's request wrote a large article in the London Times on "Black Wednesday", stating that within a year in England, "personal income would be growing by 5–6 % a year", and these predictions may have been close, although it is safe to say in September 1992, English economists and the general public in England remained skeptical and deeply concerned.

Countering the theory still held today by a few political adversaries that Soros might have inadvertently or intentionally acted to damage the British economy, Slater noted that during the weeks prior to Black Wednesday, Soros's funds had invested $500 million in British stocks which aided the British economy. To justify this investment, Soros held the belief that a country's equities often climbed in value following the devaluation of its currency. Earlier in 1984, Soros Funds had also heavily invested in British Telecom and around $20 million in Jaguar Automobiles around the time they were being fully nationalized by Prime Minister Margaret Thatcher. Investopedia, an online economic site, has written "that economic policies enacted in the U.K. in the aftermath of that day (Black Wednesday) contributed to an improvement in economic growth, lower unemployment, and less inflation."

=== Losses speculating on the Japanese Yen ===
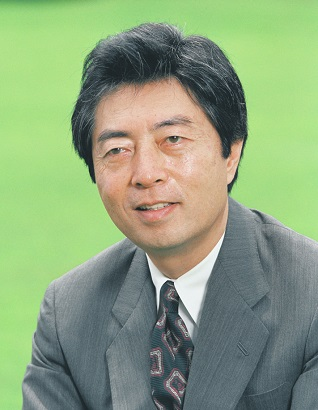
Prime Minister Hosokawa

In Chapter 25, Slater discusses Soros's large losses in his speculation on the Japanese Yen. Soros believed that trade talks between President Clinton and Japanese Prime Minister Morihiro Hosokawa would result in the United States allowing the value of the Yen to fall against the dollar which would have made imports from Japan more expensive in the United States, slightly discouraging trade from Japan. Soros had been wrong. Labeled by his employees as "The Saint Valentine's Day Massacre", the Japanese Yen closed five percent higher against the dollar on February 14, 1994, three days after the failed trade talks. Soros's failed speculation on the value of the Yen cost Soros Fund Management roughly $600 million. To discourage investors from pulling money from his funds due to a loss of confidence, particularly since rumors were building in the press that Soros had lost far more in the transaction, Stanley Druckenmiller, the acting manager of Soros Fund Management, made a statement to the press that the exact amount of the loss had been $600 million and no more. Druckenmiller also mentioned in order to affirm that Soros's losses had not seriously damaged the value of Soros Fund Management that with the inclusion of the Quantum Fund, Soros's total assets were believed to be between $11.4 and $12 billion.

==== Prior investment in the Yen ====
Slater also noted earlier in his book, in a move that could be used as a defense of Soros, that the Quantum Fund in 1985 had bought heavily into the Yen in the weeks prior to September 23, 1985, when they suspected James Baker would devalue the Dollar against the Yen. Soros increased his Fund's investment in the Yen by at least $200 million. In the 4.3% devaluation of the Dollar against the Yen, Soros made roughly 40 million, on a total Soros fund holding which he had strongly increased to around $800 million.

As Slater notes, Soros was annoyed by the late U.S. response to the genocide in Yugoslavia. Countering the claims of critics that Soros has exclusively political aims or used his foundations to obtain power, Slater noted that many of Soros's causes have been exclusively humanitarian efforts to aid the poor or at least one case, the victims of war. In 1993, the Soros Humanitarian Foundation provided $50 million in humanitarian aid to Boznia and Herzegovina.

=== Philanthropy ===
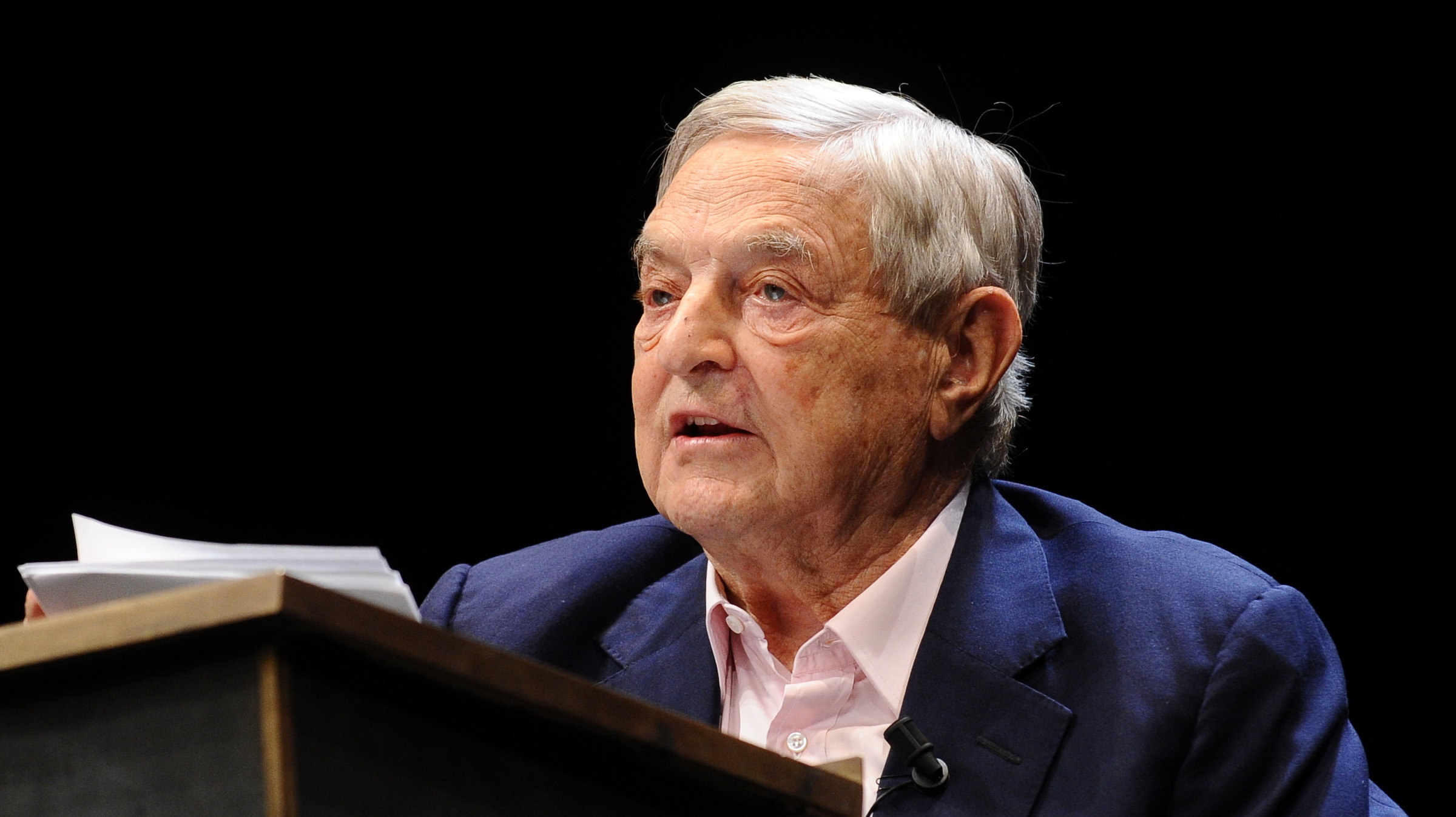
Soros at the 2012 Festival of Economics

Additional narratives on his personal life and Soros's efforts to further human rights in Hungary, China, and Russia, complete the later section of Slater's biography.Soros's foundations were highly active in opposing Apartheid in South Africa, and in countering what Soros viewed as the restraints on economic growth or reduction in civil liberties posed by Soviet influence in many Eastern European countries including first his native Hungary, then Poland, Czechoslovakia, Lithuania, and the Balkans. For his work in his native Hungary towards his efforts to modernize the country, Soros was presented with the Medium Cross of Hungary's Republican Order with Stars, the country's second-highest decoration.

Soros's Open Society Foundations were also active in opposing Apartheid in South Africa. By the early 1990s Soros's foundations, which fought to increase civil liberties often by stimulating science and other aspects of the economy, were active in eighteen countries including Romania, Bulgaria, Yugoslavia, and the new states of Ukraine, Belarus, Moldavia, Georgia, Kazakhstan, Uzbekistan, Kyrgyzstan, and Turkistan. When Yugoslavia broke apart, new foundations came into being in Croatia, Slovenia, Macedonia and Bosnia. In smaller efforts, Soros supported pro-democracy movements in Burma, and school construction projects in Albania.

=== Central European University ===
In September 1991, funded almost exclusively on his own, and staffed with globally recognized academics, Soros's founded Central European University with its first campus in Prague, Czechoslovakia and with other campuses in Budapest, Hungary and Warsaw, Poland. By 2019, Soros's annual gift to operate the University reached 20 million dollars, and his personal total endowment is approximated at $880 million. As Slater noted, the CEU may have been what he considered his greatest achievement, for according to Slater, "with 400 students from 22 countries, the CEU was Soros's dream, the project that meant the most to him". More impressively, by 2019, the University had graduated 16,000 students.

=== Drug policy reform ===
Chapter 28 covers Soros's opposition to long prison sentences for non-violent drug offenders. Soros has come under attack frequently by leaders of the America's "war on drugs", who abhor his attempts to deal with narcotics as a public health rather than a criminal problem and have more recently attacked him for supporting referendums in five states to legalize the use of marijuana for medicinal purposes. Since 1993, Soros has donated roughly 15 million to groups and foundations that favor altering America's drug policies. The Lindesmith Center, founded in 1994 by Ethan A. Adelman as a project of George Soros's Open Society Institute to conduct research in aid of drug policy reform. He gave a one million dollar donation to ballot initiatives proposing more lenient drug laws in California and Arizona and 1.1 million in August 1997 to provide clean syringes to drug addicts to prevent the spread of AIDS.

=== Project on death in America ===
After the death of his father in 1968, Soros felt strongly that the elderly should, if at all possible, be given the opportunity to die at home on their own terms, as the majority wished to die, according to polls. He promoted, but did not seek to legislate, that those dying in great pain of terminal illnesses be given the opportunity to discuss ending their lives with their children and legal counsel. Soros was strongly criticized by many conservatives for discussing the right of a segment of the elderly population to discuss their option to end their lives when there was no way of ending their pain and little or medical help that might extend their lives. In 1993, Soros held a meeting of experts to discuss what would become known as the Project on Death in America.

=== Opposition to George Bush ===
George W. Bush

In Chapter 30, which was added for the 2009 edition, Slater covers Soros's opposition to President George W. Bush, and makes an observation that powerfully debunks a number of conspiracy theories that continue to target Soros.Slater wrote, "True, he (Soros) has sprinkled his money around to a wide assortment of progressive groups, but he had not run or controlled any of them. He played no operational role in any of them. According to his closest aids, he gave no marching orders to any of these groups, not to MoveOn.org, not to ACT, not to the others." This observation could also be applied to more contemporary claims that Soros has funded violent protests by supporters of the Black Lives Matter organization, that he has funded caravans of Mexican migrants attempting to cross the Texas border, or that he is somehow responsible for the violence or property destruction that occurred during the 2020 protests against police violence.

In brief, Soros opposed George Bush's 2004 candidacy due to his use of torture, his involvement in two wars which Soros believed killed more innocent civilians than 911, his opposition to immigration, and to a far lesser extent his stands on gay rights, and abortion. Soros also believed Bush had exaggerated the threat to America posed by Iraq. Soros belied the Patriot Act violated the rights of American citizens to privacy in their financial and personal lives by allowing the Federal government more access to their medical, financial, and electronic mail records. Soros also questioned the single mindedness with which Bush declared the potential to declare war on any country believed to be harboring terrorists. He was particularly wary of the Bush speech in which Bush stated using absolutist rhetoric, "We will pursue nations that provide aid or safe haven to terrorism...Either you are for us or you are against us. From this day forward, any nation that continues to harbor or support terrorism will be regarded by the United States as a hostile regime."Bush spoke with equal ardor at West Point on June 1, 2002, when he stated, "The United States would now take offensive military action against any country that it suspected of posing a terrorist threat". Soros considered such language too militaristic, and bellicose and was concerned it might affect America's ability to use diplomacy as a first course of action.

Soros's opposition to Bush's second term and his limited financial support for organizations like moveon.org which gave soft money to primarily Democratic candidates likely aroused the greatest opposition from America's far right media of any of his American philanthropic efforts. Soros's total contribution to the Democratic party during the Bush campaign was approximately $27 million, only 5% of what he gave in charitable contributions in 2004, and hardly enough to exert any serious control over the Democratic party which received vastly more in contributions that year. As Slater also noted, though he gave $2.5 million to Moveon.org in 2004, he "had no operational or governance or advisory role", and had no such role at any time.

=== French insider trading charge ===
In 2002, Soros was charged with and found guilty of insider trading by a French court due to a 1988 purchase of stock he had made in the French bank Societe Generale and three other newly privatized French companies. Soros was told by an intermediary that a French businessman wanted to put together a group of investors to buy shares in private companies. Soros was never asked to sign a confidentiality agreement, but he did later buy stock in Societe Generale and other French companies. The Commission des operations de bourse (COB), the French equivalent of the U. S. Securities and Exchange Commission SEC, concluded that Soros and the other individuals charged had broken no law, but its decision was not binding. Ultimately, Soros was required to pay back $1,098,068 of the roughly $2 million he had profited from his trades. Only a small part of the trade had actually been made in France, with most of it taking place in the U.S. and London. More significantly, Soros himself was never accused of having any inside information, rather that the man who approached him had informed him of the intentions of a third party. According to a knowledgeable source, Soros's credibility was not damaged by the conviction, "Because Americans understood that this conviction was a huge stretch even under French law applicable in 1988, as the opinion of the Commission des operations de bourse had indicated."

== Critical reviews ==
The World of Books website writes that the updated 2009 edition focuses on five key points;

- How Soros earned his wealth trading global currency and investing in equities
- How Soros helped to bring down communism and establish open societies in Eastern Europe and the former Soviet Union
- How an investor can understand his complex macroeconomic approach to investing, and his often misunderstood theory of reflexivity
- How an outsider can understand what his motives were for unseating George Bush, and interpret his growing involvement in leftist political action groups
- How to use Soros's strategies for surviving in the confusion of today's credit markets.

The investment periodical Barrons notes that Slater encapsulates Soros's most essential approach to investment, by successfully explaining "how Soros views markets as chaotic, not efficient, and very prone to boom-bust sequences." It is Soros's theory of reflexivity that explains how outside forces, particularly investors themselves interact with the market in continuous feedback cycles which at times lead to booms or busts, which Soros believes investors can sometimes use to guide their investment strategy.

In a review of the book for the Fort Worth Star-Telegram, Teresa McUsic captures Soros's macroeconomic approach to investment; "We aren't as much interested in what a company is going to earn next quarter, ... as we are in how broad social, economic and political factors will alter the destiny of an industry or stock group for some time to come. If there is a wide difference between what we see and the market price of a stock, all the better, because then we can make money". But McUsic felt the first edition of the book which had limited access to Soros suffered from a lack of his input. The 2008 updated version reviewed here, however seems to have gained considerable insight as a result of access to Soros.

David Darst, Director and Chief Investment Strategist for Morgan Stanley's Global Wealth Management, emphasizing that the 2009 edition provides real depth into Soros, writes "Slater takes you inside the mind of a global investing genius and delivers priceless, timeless, and peerless insights into Soros's financial acumen and wide-ranging altruism".
