= Isabel Ge Mahe =

Chinese businesswoman

- 葛越
- Born: GE Yue; 1973 (age 52–53); Shenyang, Liaoning, China
- Education: Simon Fraser University (BASc, MEng); University of California, Berkeley (MBA)
- Occupation: Businesswoman
- Title: Apple Inc. vice president and managing director
- Term: Since May 2017
- Spouse: Married
- Children: 4

Isabel Ge Mahe (Chinese: 葛越; born 1973) is a Chinese businesswoman, currently working for Apple Inc. as the company's vice president and managing director of Greater China.

== Early life and education ==
Isabel Ge Mahe was born in Shenyang, Liaoning, China, in 1973. Her father, a college professor who received a job as a mining consultant in Vancouver, brought her along to Canada, while her older sister remained in China.

Ge received a Bachelor of Applied Science in 1997 and a Master of Engineering in 2000, both in electrical engineering and from Simon Fraser University in British Columbia, Canada. She received a Master of Business Administration from the University of California, Berkeley in the United States in 2008.

== Career ==
Before joining Apple, Mahe was vice president of wireless software engineering at Palm Inc

In 2008, Mahe joined Apple as vice president of wireless technologies.

In May 2017, Mahe was appointed managing director in charge of Apple's Greater China region. According to Patrick McGee in his book Apple in China, her role as general manager has been "largely ceremonial."

In Fortune magazine's most powerful women international for 2017, Mahe was ranked #12. She was ranked 77th on the list in 2023.

== Personal life ==
Mahe is married, with four children, and lives in Shanghai.
