= 2025 Governor General's Awards =

Canadian literary award

The shortlisted nominees for the 2025 Governor General's Awards for Literary Merit were announced on October 21, 2025, and the winners were announced on November 6.

== English ==
Category	Winner	Nominated
Fiction	Kyle Edwards, Small Ceremonies	Benjamin Hertwig, Juiceboxers; Fawn Parker, Hi, It's Me; Maria Reva, Endling; Katherena Vermette, real ones
Non-fiction	Claire Cameron, How to Survive a Bear Attack	Shane Neilson, What to Feel, How to Feel: Lyric Essays on Neurodivergence and Neurofatherhood; Vinh Nguyen, The Migrant Rain Falls in Reverse; Ruby Smith Dίaz, Searching for Serafim: The Life and Legacy of Serafim “Joe” Fortes; Teresa Wong, All Our Ordinary Stories: A Multigenerational Family Odyssey
Poetry	Karen Solie, Wellwater	Farah Ghafooor, Shadow Price; Lorna Goodison, Dante’s Inferno: A new translation; Michael Trussler, 10:10; Douglas Walbourne-Gough, Island
Drama	Tara Beagan, Rise, Red River	Catherine Banks, Downed Hearts; Tara Beagan, The Ministry of Grace; Alisa Palmer and Hannah Moscovitch, Fall on Your Knees; Anusree Roy, Little Pretty and The Exceptional
Children's literature	Heather Smith, Tig	Deborah Ellis, The Outsmarters; Kenneth Oppel, Best of All Worlds; Léa Taranto, A Drop in the Ocean; Richard Van Camp, Beast
Children's illustration	Tonya Simpson and Delreé Dumont, This Land Is a Lullaby	Guojing, Oasis; Sid Sharp, Bog Myrtle; Kathy Stinson and Brooke Kerrigan, The Rock and the Butterfly; Tanya Tagaq and Cee Pootoogook, It Bears Repeating
French to English translation	Jessica Moore, Uiesh/Somewhere (Joséphine Bacon, Uiesh/Quelque part)	Phyllis Aronoff and Howard Scott, Farida (Monia Mazigh, Farida); Helge Dascher and Rob Aspinall, Muybridge (Guy Delisle, Muybridge); Catherine Khordoc, Baldwin, Styron and Me (Mélikah Abdelmoumen, Baldwin, Styron et moi); Donald Winkler, May Our Joy Endure (Kev Lambert, Que notre joie demeure)

== French ==
Category	Winner	Nominated
Fiction	Katia Belkhodja, Les déterrées	Alexandra Boilard-Lefebvre, Une histoire silencieuse; Martina Chumova, Je mets mes rêves sur la table; Patrice Lessard, Rapines; Cristina Vanciu, Femmes silencieuses
Non-fiction	Ouanessa Younsi, Soigner, écrire	Alain Denault, Faire que! L’engagement politique à l’ère de l’inouï; Nathalie Plaat, Mourir de froid, c’est beau, c’est long, c’est délicieux; Maïka Sondarjee, Tu viens d’où? Réflexions sur le métissage et les frontières; Louise Warren, Recueillir
Poetry	Paul Chanel Malenfant, Au passage du fleuve	Angelina Guo, Comparution; Catherine Harton, Les sutures; Stéphane Martelly, Mourir est beau; Laurence Veilleux, Aller aux corps
Drama	Éric Noël, Ces regards amoureux de garçons altérés	Maxime Brillon, Awards; Rébecca Déraspe, Fanny; Olivier Kemeid, La vengeance et l’oubli; Danièle LeBlanc, Paysages
Children's literature	Laurie Léveillé, Coup bas	Laura Doyle Péan, Cheer; Marc-André Dufour-Labbé, Fatigué mort; Catherine Fouron, Vieille branche; Noémie Pomerleau-Cloutier, Tête boule disco
Children's illustration	Stéphane Laporte and Jacques Goldstyn, Un cadeau de Noël en novembre	Jocelyn Boisvert and Enzo, Le livre aspirateur; Annick Lefebvre and Vincent Partel-Valette, En crise; Charlotte Parent, Murielle et le mystère; Catherine Trudeau and Qin Leng, Le tasse de Gilles
English to French translation	Sylvie Bérard and Suzanne Grenier, Les soeurs de la Muée (Larissa Lai, The Tiger Flu)	Marie Frankland, Rouge (Mona Awad, Rouge); Annie Goulet, Créatures obscures du 21e siècle (Kim Fu, Lesser Known Monsters of the 21st Century); Catherine Leroux, Étude pour l’obéissance (Sarah Bernstein, Study for Obedience); Geneviève Robichaud and Danielle LeBlanc, Nous, Jane (Aimee Wall, We, Jane)
