= Good Girl (novel) =

2025 debut novel by Aria Aber

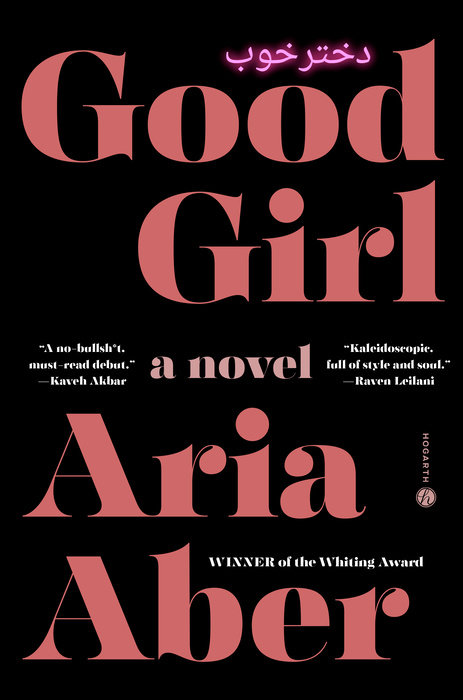
- Author: Aria Aber
- Genre: Literary fiction
- Publisher: Hogarth Press
- Publication date: January 14, 2025
- Pages: 368
- ISBN: 9780593731116
- Preceded by: Hard Damage

Good Girl is the 2025 debut novel written by German-American writer Aria Aber, published by Hogarth Press.

== Synopsis ==
Set in Berlin, the novel follows a year in the life of Nila, a 19-year-old artist and daughter of Afghan refugees. There, she navigates night life, artistry, and confrontations with Marlowe, an American writer.

== Critical reception ==
Publishers Weekly, in a starred review, called Good Girl "a stunning coming-of-age story set amid Berlin’s underground art and music scene" and concluded that "Aber offers readers both a piercing look into Nila’s psyche and an acute sense of place. It's a remarkable achievement." Kirkus Reviews stated that "Aber's storytelling also often undercuts its own tensions... Still, Aber’s vivid depiction of Berlin and the novel’s earnest wrestling with shame about desire and identity will be of interest to many readers," ultimately concluding that Good Girl was "A debut still in the process of finding itself—like its young protagonist."

R. O. Kwon, writing for The New York Times, called Good Girl an "exhilarating debut novel" and lauded Aber's pivot from poetry: "Aber's first book was a collection of poetry; she has published astonishing poems I’ve read dozens of times. It’s thrilling to see her turn major poetic gifts toward the sweep of this Künstlerroman, the story of a young woman becoming other than she used to be." Kwon also compared Aber's space-making writing to that of James Baldwin.

Jasmine Vojdani, in Vulture, stated that Good Girl served as a compelling portrait of "Muslim girlhood" as well as the xenophobic atmosphere in Germany but lamented the novel's failure to "rehash the same narrative associations without deepening or complicating them" as well as satisfyingly interrogate Nila's own internalized racism.

The Guardian was less interested in the character of Marlowe but nonetheless wrote highly of Good Girl's dynamic between self and society:

Much of this dark, breathtaking novel is about the tortures of being 19, penniless, and obsessed with literature, sex and beauty. But its most profound insights concern the indignities we dual-culture Persian daughters know so viscerally: the intertwined shames of body and country, and a sense of superiority in our western educations.

== Awards ==
Good Girl was shortlisted for the 2025 Women's Prize for Fiction.
