= Noah Warren =

American poet

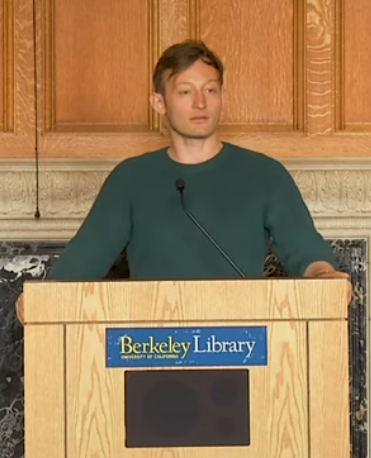
- Born: Nova Scotia, Canada
- Education: Yale University
- Spouse: Aria Aber
- Writing career
- Genre: Poetry
- Notable awards: Stegner Fellow

Noah Warren is a Canadian-American poet and 2015 winner of the Yale Series of Younger Poets Competition; his entry The Destroyer in the Glass was published in 2016.

== Biography ==
Warren was born in Nova Scotia, Canada, and grew up in Charlestown, Rhode Island. He attended Yale University and UC Berkeley. He is a former Stegner Fellow at Stanford University. He was a James Merrill House Fellow in 2016.

== Works ==
- The Destroyer in the Glass, New Haven, Connecticut; London: Yale University Press, 2016. ISBN 9780300217148, OCLC 920017478
- The Complete Stories, Port Townsend, Washington: Copper Canyon Press, 2021. ISBN 978-1556596162
