= Daniel Wang =

Daniel Wang may refer to:

- Daniel I.C. Wang (1936–2020), Chinese-born professor of chemical engineering at the Massachusetts Institute of Technology
- Dan Wang, Canadian technology analyst
- Qingde Wang, Chinese-born professor of astronomy at the University of Massachusetts Amherst
