= John Obienu =

Nigerian Army major

John Obienu was a Nigerian Army major who knew of and was a co-conspirator in the 1966 coup d'état that ended the government of Abubakar Tafawa Balewa, the first Prime Minister of Nigeria. He was later credited to have switched sides and helped suppress the coup.

== Career and role in the January 15, 1966 coup d'etat ==
Obienu attended the Royal Military College, Sandhurst, and according to General Babangida in his book, A Journey in Service, Obienu was the best overall overseas cadet in his set at Sandhurst. Obienu was initially sympathetic to the plotters of the January coup. As the Reece Squadron commander in Ibadan, his troops were critical for mobilizing and securing any strategic advantage. He was to move his troops and armoured vehicles to Lagos to support Emmanuel Ifeajuna's operations there, but failed to show up on the night. Some accounts of the plotters indicate that he was suspected to have tipped off General Aguiyi Ironsi of the impending coup, thus helping foil it. Moreso, after the coup was underway, he provided his critical troops to General Ironsi to suppress the rebellion. Fifty-eight years after the coup, General Ibrahim Babangida in his memoir "A Journey In Service"(2025), credited Obienu, an Igbo man, as a key factor in crushing the coup. Babangida thus lifted the veil on the oft-cited notion that the January 15 coup was an Igbo coup. He asserted that this was not the case.

== Death ==
John Obienu was murdered in cold blood by the coupists of the July 29, 1966 counter coup. He was reported to have been shot in the Officers' Mess at the Abeokuta Garrison with Lt. Col. Gabriel Okonweze at the onset of the coup by mutineering Northern troops who were avenging the deaths of Northern politicians killed in the January coup. Okonweze had convened a meeting of all officers at the Mess after being alerted of a suspected counter-coup in the offing. This summons served to ignite the spark that led to the actual start of the coup, as the mutineers preempted any suspicion and leaks. Northern Non-Commissioned Officers and Officer Cadets approached the Mess and opened fire. Obienu was shot alongside Okonweze, Lt. E.B.Orok (an Efik man), and other officers of Igbo extraction in the Garrison.
