= Teresa Wong (cartoonist) =

Canadian cartoonist (born 1976)

Teresa Wong is a Chinese-Canadian cartoonist and author of two graphic memoirs. Wong is a second-generation Canadian.

== Career ==
Wong published her debut graphic memoir, Dear Scarlet: The Story of My Postpartum Depression, in 2019. Dear Scarlet illustrates Wong's experience with postpartum depression after the birth of her first child. A review in The New York Times describes Wong's graphic memoir as a "fresh voice" in cartooning. Several reviews have noted the drawings help mothers cope with postpartum mental health.

In 2024, she published her second book, All Our Ordinary Stories: A Multigenerational Family Odyssey, which pieces together her family's history, including the stories of her parents' escapes from China during the Cultural Revolution in the 1970s. It was featured as an NPR "Books We Love" in 2024, where editors described it as an "expertly paced work of comics told in black and white, using crisp, direct prose alongside unassuming but meaningful illustrations."

Her comics have appeared in The Believer, The New Yorker, and McSweeney's, among other outlets. Some of Wong's comics and writing addresses the tension between motherhood and creating art.

Wong also teaches classes in memoir and comics at Gotham Writers and was the 2021-2022 writer in residence at the University of Calgary. Her comics process and creative practice are described in an article published in 2023 by Krishnan and Jha.

== Recognition ==
Dear Scarlet was a finalist for the Calgary W.O. Mitchell Book Prize and made the CBC Reads 2020 Longlist.

All Our Ordinary Stories was a finalist for the Calgary W.O. Mitchell Book Prize and won two Alberta Literary Awards: the Memoir Award and the Wilfrid Eggleston Award for Nonfiction. It also made the CBC Reads 2025 Longlist and was nominated for a 2025 Governor General's Literary Award in the English nonfiction category.

== Selected Works ==
- All Our Ordinary Stories: A Multigenerational Family Odyssey, 2024, published by Arsenal Pulp Press
- Capitalism is running out of flavors, 2024, published in The New Yorker
- Dear Scarlet: The Story of My Postpartum Depression, 2019, published by Arsenal Pulp Press
- This is Not a Feel-Good Movie, 2020, published in The Believer
- Draw Your Lockdown Life, 2020, published in The Believer
- Drawing Comics About Movies, 2021, published in The Believer
- Hold On, Mommy's Just Trying to Finish Reading the Internet, 2021, published in The New Yorker
- Piano Lessons, 2021, published in The Believer
- Safety Net, 2022, published in McSweeney's
- Screaming & Watercolours: I Turned My Toddler's Tantrum Into Art, 2022, published in The Walrus
- Searching for Proof, 2023, CBC
