= A Barrister for the Earth =

2025 book by Monica Feria-Tinta

- First edition cover
- Author: Monica Feria-Tinta
- Audio read by: Monica Feria-Tinta
- Language: English
- Genre: non-fiction
- Publisher: Faber & Faber
- Publication date: 24 April 2025
- Publication place: England
- Media type: Print (Hardcover)
- Pages: 352
- ISBN: 9780571386369

A Barrister for the Earth is the 2025 debut non-fiction book by the British-Peruvian author Monica Feria Tinta, exploring how legal systems can rise to protect life on planet Earth. The book treats the Earth as a living organism and asks whether a planet can have legal rights, whether it could be defended in a court of law, and how we could redefine a 'right to life'. The book was published by Faber & Faber in April 2025. The book has been shortlisted for Best Political Book by a Non-Parliamentarian at the 2025 Westminster Book Awards.

== Background ==
The book draws on Feria-Tinta's practice as an environmental and climate law barrister and focuses on the "'power of the law to create change and redress the environmental harm and ecological degradation' caused by mankind'".

== Reception ==
Writing for Vogue, Zing TSJeng praised Feria-Tinta and said that the book "expertly guides" readers through her work.

The Middle Templar similarly praised the book, finding A Barrister for the Earth "to be exceptional for its accessibility and stylistically a joy to read". It further noted: "This is as much an account of important historical and social context, rich cultural heritage, and past and present injustices, as it is a roadmap through the web of legal instruments, mechanisms, and creative argumentation necessary to protect the rights of nature and those who depend on it".

Horsfall, writing for The Middle Templar, notes that "Readers are treated to something rare in legal writing, a personal display of Feria-Tinta as she is: inspired by Alexander von Humboldt's notions of human interconnectedness with nature; dazzled by the more recent work of Dacher Kelter's Awe: The Transformative Power of Everyday Wonder; laser-focused on writing to the tune of David Bowie's Starman; and culminating with the image of her seated in her gown and wig at her kitchen table in London, taking copious notes, and waiting to argue for the rights of an 'irreplaceable world,' a cloud forest in Ecuador."

Camilla Capasso, writing for Vanity Fair Italia, described A Barrister for the Earth as a book that is "redefin[ing] the very concept of justice" and "radically rethinking our way of inhabiting the Earth".

On 5 December 2025, The Nerve included it among "The Nerve's Best Books of 2025", naming it as "a powerful read from a top climate barrister introducing increasingly important questions". In December 2025, Forbes magazine, included the book in a list of selected climate books to read for 2026. Monica Sanders, writing, said about A Barrister for the Earth: "The cases here illustrate how court decisions can reset expectations for regulators, boards, and investors, especially on disclosure, due diligence, and the rights of affected communities."

== Adaptation ==
On 27 April 2026 it was announced that Sony Pictures Television-owned UK production company Eleventh Hour Films is partnering with Climate Spring to develop a legal drama based on Monica Feria-Tinta’s non-fiction book A Barrister for the Earth.
