= Hard Damage =

2019 debut poetry collection by Aria Aber

- Author: Aria Aber
- Publisher: University of Nebraska Press
- Publication date: September 1, 2019
- Pages: 126
- Awards: Prairie Schooner Book Prize in Poetry; Whiting Award
- ISBN: 978-1496215703
- Followed by: Good Girl

Hard Damage is a 2019 debut poetry collection by Aria Aber. It was published by University of Nebraska Press after winning the Prairie Schooner Book Prize in Poetry in 2018. In 2020, Aber received a Whiting Award for the book.

== Contents ==
Aber grew up as the daughter of Afghan refugees who resettled in Germany. She later moved to the United States and studied poetry at New York University's MFA program. Written partly during Aber's studies in New York City, the book's poems contend with, among other things, historical events in Afghanistan such as the Soviet–Afghan War and the funding of the Afghan mujahideen.

Some of the poems make reference to Rainer Maria Rilke, such as "Reading Rilke at Lake Mendota, Wisconsin". In interviews, Aber cited Rilke as an enormous influence on her as a poet and person. In Atticus Review, she stated: "Rilke had a great appreciation for the world of childhood, and the older I get, the more I understand the tremendous sanctitude of that. Childhood is a time of art, of pure poetry, of connection to the divine ... So, I think I am speaking through Rilke and of Rilke all the time because there is this urge to reach toward the divine, the purity of the soul, even in times of war."

== Critical reception ==
Publishers Weekly said that "Though not every poem here may achieve its ambition, the book engages with important geopolitical events."

Critics appreciated Aber's approach to the difficult subject matter of modern war. The Rumpus said that the book "reminds readers that every displaced person, whether refugee, immigrant, or the child of one, carries with them a parcel of stories, stories that are often suppressed and mutated by the dominant culture, or lost to reductive media coverage." Similarly, The Los Angeles Review of Books stated that "If documentary witness shows us what is, Aber’s is a lyric witness—summoning the conditional and counterfactual as constitutive components of the present." The Kenyon Review found that "A sharp morality directs this collection, demonstrating the speaker’s power in her ability to understand and relay the complexity of her position in global conflicts." The Bind stated that "The poems range impressively from zoomed out catalogues of US military interventions to focused considerations of how the political impacts family and the displaced self." The Cleveland Review of Books analyzed Aber's relationships to Afghan history and Rainer Maria Rilke, juxtaposing the book with Solmaz Sharif's poetry.

Critics also felt that the book's approaches to love, family, and identity were poignant. The Manchester Review stated that the book "charts immigrant experience in a way which is highly imaginative but also sustained and controlled." The Atticus Review observed Aber's "deep love" for "her mother, family, the poet Rainer Maria Rilke ... and the many people of Afghanistan—those who brave the war and those who are in exile, their compass pointed toward home."
