= Noreen Riols =

British novelist and SOE agent (1926–2025)

Noreen Riols MBE
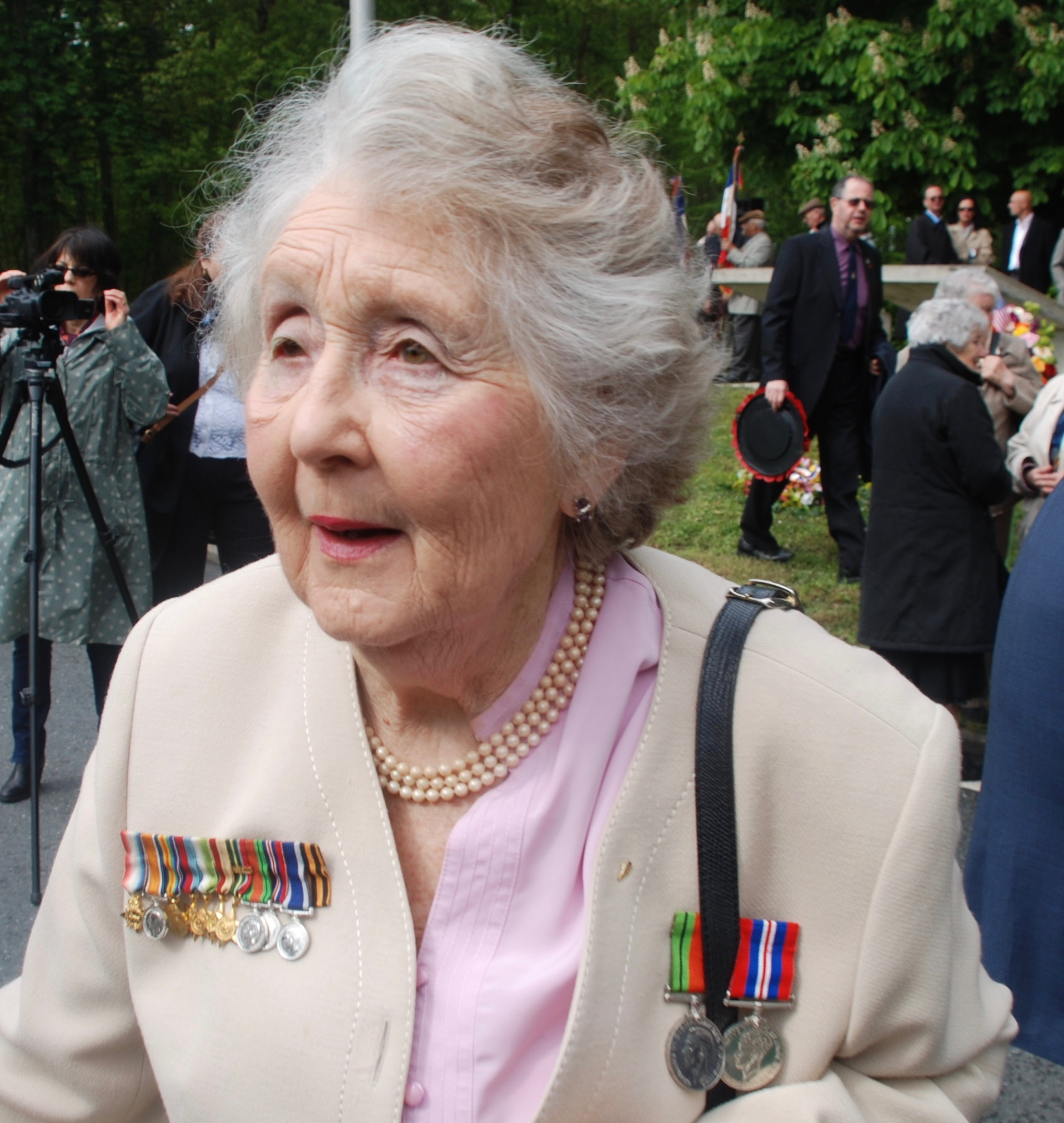
- Riols in 2012
- Born: Noreen Patricia Baxter; 8 May 1926; Crown Colony of Malta
- Died: 2 January 2025 (aged 98)
- Occupation: Novelist

Noreen Patricia Riols, MBE (née Baxter; 8 May 1926 – 2 January 2025) was a British novelist. During the Second World War, she worked for the Special Operations Executive, a British espionage and sabotage organisation.

== Life and career ==
Riols was born in 1926 in Malta, where her father was serving in the Royal Navy. She studied at the French Lycée in London, and at age 17 she applied to join the Women's Royal Naval Service (Wrens). Because of her fluency in French, she was instead recruited into the F-section (F=France) of the Special Operations Executive (SOE). The F-section recruited and trained spies and agents to be dropped into France where they would sabotage Nazi operations and support the French Resistance. SOE training took place at a number of locations around Britain including Beaulieu in the New Forest. Riols was "trained and was eventually based at the organisation's headquarters in The Mall and at the training camp in the New Forest". Her role was to train agents in activities such as passing messages covertly or how to follow someone, and to act as a decoy in scenarios created to test agents.

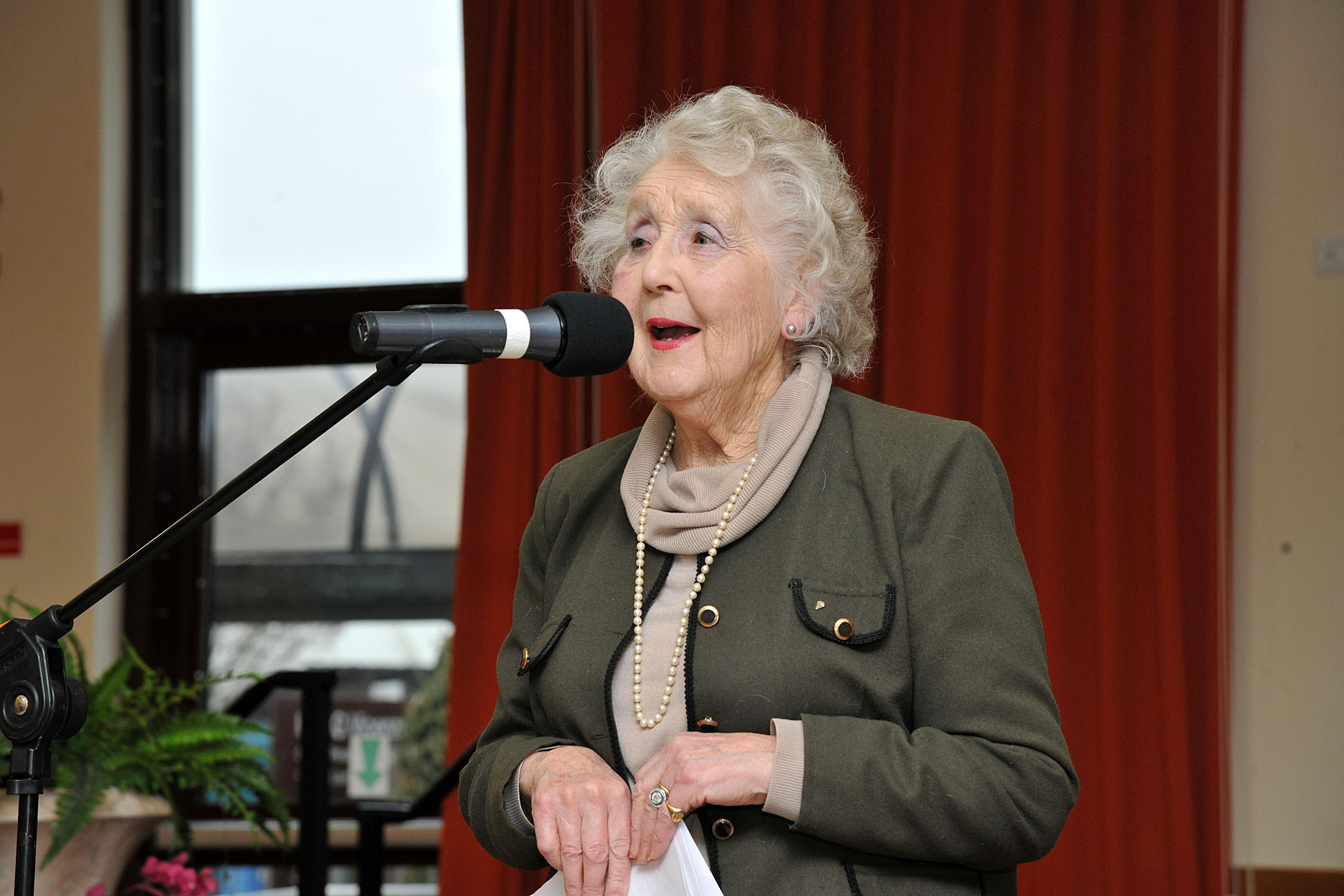
Noreen Riols, 2013

After the war she worked for the BBC World Service and trained as a nurse. She lived in Romania, moving to Paris in 1956 where she worked as a journalist. She married Jacques Riols and had five children, and held dual French and British nationality.

She wrote four novels (the Ardnakil Chronicles) based on her experiences in SOE: Katherine, To live again, Before the dawn and Where love endures. In Eye of the Storm she wrote about how her faith helped alleviate her depression.

In 2014 she published a memoir of her time in the SOE, The Secret Ministry of Ag. & Fish: my life in Churchill's school for spies. The title of the book came from the cover she used during the war; because her work was covered by the Official Secrets Act she told family and friends that she worked for the Ministry of Agriculture and Fisheries. Riols tried unsuccessfully to be recognised as a war veteran in France, but was told that Britain was not a war zone, and that the SOE was not an operational unit.

Riols was appointed Member of the Order of the British Empire (MBE) in the 2023 New Year Honours for services to UK/France relations and World War II education.

Riols died on 2 January 2025, at the age of 98.

== Publications ==
=== Non-fiction ===
- Eye of the Storm (1983)
- Abortion: A woman's birth right? (1986)
- Only the best (1987)
- When suffering comes (1990)
- My unknown child: a personal story of abortion (1995)
- The Secret Ministry of Ag. & Fish: my life in Churchill's school for spies (2014)

=== Fiction ===
- Laura (1992)
- Where hope shines through (1994)
- Katherine (1994)
- To live again (1995; republished 2013)
- Before the dawn (1996; republished 2013)
- Where love endures (1997; republished 2013)
- Autumn sonata (2014)
