= Anatole Kaletsky =

British economist and journalist (born 1952)

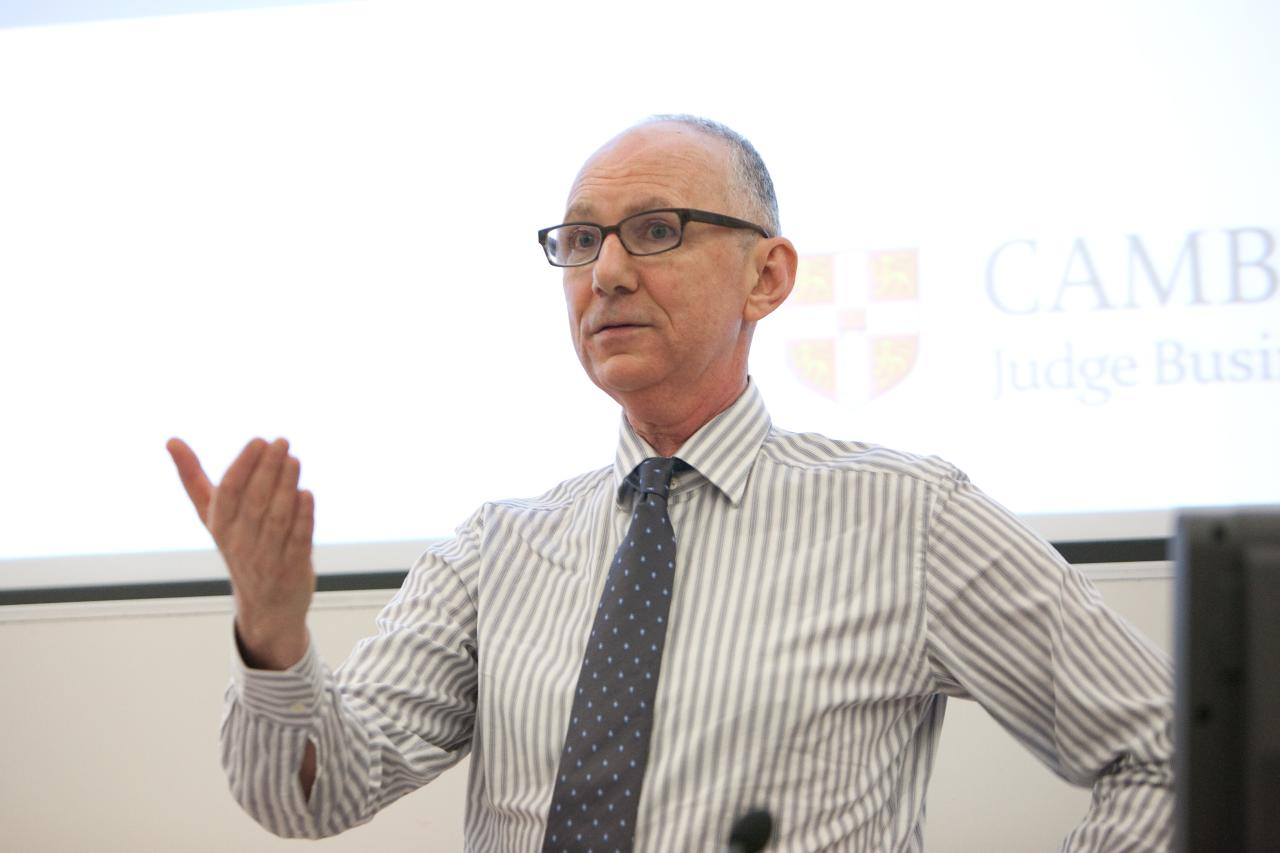
- Kaletsky addressing the Cambridge Judge Business School in 2010
- Born: 1 June 1952 (age 74); Moscow, USSR

Academic background
- Education: Westminster City School; King's College, Cambridge; Harvard University

Anatole Kaletsky (born 1 June 1952) is an economist and journalist based in the United Kingdom. He has written since 1976 for The Economist, The Financial Times and The Times of London before joining Reuters and The International Herald Tribune in 2012. He has been named Newspaper Commentator of the Year in the BBC's What the Papers Say awards, and has twice received the British Press Award for Specialist Writer of the Year.

Kaletsky has been an economic consultant since 1997, providing policy analysis and asset allocation advice to over 800 financial institutions, multinational companies and international organisations through his company, Gavekal, which is co-run with Louis and Charles Gave. He was elected to the governing Council of the Royal Economic Society in 1998.

== Early life ==
Kaletsky was born in 1952 in Moscow, USSR and also spent his childhood in Poland and Australia. He has lived in England and the US since 1966.

== Education ==
Kaletsky was educated at Westminster City School, at that time a grammar school in the City of Westminster in central London, followed by King's College, Cambridge, where he graduated with a first class honours degree in Mathematics, and then at Harvard, where he was a Kennedy Memorial Scholar and gained a master's degree in economics.

== Life and career ==
In 1976, Kaletsky joined The Economist, writing about business and finance. Three years later he moved to the Financial Times, working in a variety of posts including New York Bureau Chief, Washington Correspondent, International Economics Correspondent and Moscow Correspondent.

Beginning in 1990, Kaletsky was Economics Editor of The Times, and later became Editor-at-Large. In early 2012, Kaletsky began his new post, in the Analysis and Opinion section of the Reuters online newspaper, where he wrote a weekly column. His articles also appeared in print around the world in the International New York Times. Since early 2015, Kaletsky has been writing for Project Syndicate and Prospect Magazine.

He was a full-time journalist for The Times, The Economist, and the Financial Times from 1976 to 1998. He was named Newspaper Commentator of the Year, Economic Journalist of the Year, European Journalist of the Year and Specialist Writer of the Year.

By 2012 he was writing a column for The Times of London and serving as editor at large, joining as an economics editor in 1990.

In 2012, Kaletsky left the Times of London to become a Reuters columnist.

In 2010, Kaletsky suggested the emergence of a new form of capitalism, which he calls Capitalism 4.0. The book's writing was primarily influenced by the subprime mortgage crises of 2007 to 2009; and draws upon the pattern or the fallibility of capitalism. In his book Capitalism 4.0: The Birth of a New Economy in the Aftermath of Crisis, Kaletsky suggests that capitalism is "not a static set of institutions but an evolutionary system that reinvents and reinvigorates itself through crisis. He published the "controversial" book Capitalism 4.0: The Birth of a New Economy in the Aftermath of Crisis in 2011, putting the 2007 to 2009 recession into "historical and ideological perspective."

In 2012, Kaletsky was appointed Chairman of the Institute for New Economic Thinking, a foundation established after the 2008 financial crisis with $200 million of grants from George Soros, Paul Volcker, William Janeway, Jim Balsillie and other financiers. INET was set up post-crisis to challenge the mainstream assumptions in contemporary economic research.

On his Reuters' blog, Kaletsky appealed several times to the central banks to do "quantitative easing for the people". This solution would consist in enabling central banks to create debt-free money and inject it into the economy through direct cash transfers to the citizens (i.e. helicopter money), instead of injecting money through the banking system. Kaletsky claims this radical solution "may be another idea whose time has come".

As China experienced a period of stock market turbulence in the summer of 2015 worsened by "economic weakness, financial panic, and the policy response to these problems," Kalestsky disagreed with those who claimed that China was the "global economy’s weakest link." He claimed that "weak economic data leads to financial turmoil, which induces policy blunders that in turn fuel more financial panic, economic weakness, and policy mistakes."

In Project Syndicate in February 2016, Kaletsky confidently but incorrectly predicted that Britain would not vote to leave the European Union. In March 2020, he spoke at the Investment Week Funds to Watch conference, talking about projected effects of coronavirus. He is a board member of the organization Best for Britain. He continues to write for the Business Times.

== Personal life ==
Kaletsky is married to Fiona Murphy, a documentary film producer, and they have three children: Kitty, Misha, and Sasha.
