= Tidiane Diakité =

Malian-born French historian and writer (1944–2025)

- Born: 1944; French Sudan
- Died: 2 January 2025 (aged 80)
- Education: University of Bamako
- Occupations: Historian, writer

Tidiane Diakité (1944 – 2 January 2025) was a Malian-born French historian and writer. He taught primarily in France and earned the titles of Knight of the Ordre des Palmes académiques and Knight of the Legion of Honour. He wrote several books on Subsaharan Africa.

== Life and career ==
Born in French Sudan (today Mali) in 1944, Diakité studied at the University of Bamako and earned his Baccalauréat. He was then sent against his will to Cuba to study journalism before teaching in Senegal and Ivory Coast. Later, he moved to France, staying in Dijon, Rennes, and L'Hermitage. While in France, he wrote a blog which discussed history, institutions, and culture. He also discussed the systemic problems facing Africa, including its "sickness". For Diakité, there was not one Africa, but several, including 54 states and more than 6000 languages. He was asked to give lectures by associations which had partnerships with Africa, as well as French schools and universities.

Diakité's works were later praised and cited by historians, including Olivier Grenouilleau. He also wrote of the links between African and European monarchies prior to and during the slave trade. He was particularly interested in the African relations of Louis XIV.

Diakité died on 2 January 2025, at the age of 80.

== Publications ==
- L'Afrique malade d'elle-même (1986)
- Appel à la jeunesse africaine. Comment se fait-il que l'Afrique aidée par la France ne progresse pas ? (2001)
- L'Afrique et l'aide. Ou comment s'en sortir ? (2002)
- France que fais-tu de ta république ? (2004)
- Mutations et crise de l'école publique - Le professeur est mort, vive le prof (2006)
- L'Afrique expliquée - Réponses aux questions des jeunes (2006)
- La Traite des Noirs et ses acteurs africains - Du XVe siècle au XIXe siècle (2008)
- L'immigration n'est pas une Histoire sans paroles (2008)
- Cinquante ans après, l'Afrique (2011)
- Louis XIV et l'Afrique noire (2013)

=== Collective works ===
- L’Afrique enseignée, territoire(s), identité(s), culture(s) (2007)
- Femmes et genre dans l’enseignement (2009)
- "Flux migratoires et globalisation" (2009)
- Arts et Histoires des esclavages, abécédaire raisonné des arts et de l'histoire des esclavages (2016)
- Des héros aux acteurs. Essai sur une histoire incarnée (2017)

== Distinctions ==
- Knight of the Legion of Honour
- Knight of the Ordre des Palmes académiques
- Prix Robert-Cornevin of the Académie des sciences d'outre-mer for Louis XIV et l'Afrique noire (2013)
