= Adam Ross (author) =

American novelist (born 1967)

- Born: February 15, 1967 (age 59); New York City, U.S.
- Education: Vassar College; Hollins University (MA); Washington University in St. Louis (MFA)

Adam Ross (born February 15, 1967) is an American writer and editor best known for his 2010 novel Mr. Peanut.

== Biography ==
Ross was born and raised in New York City. As a child actor, he appeared in the 1979 film The Seduction of Joe Tynan, as well as numerous television shows, commercials, and radio dramas. Ross attended the Trinity School, where he was a state champion wrestler. His early literary fixations included Frank Herbert's Dune and the comic books of John Byrne, Frank Miller, and Walt Simonson, which he loved "with such a passion that I read them into a state of frayed worthlessness".

After graduating from Vassar College in 1989, Ross received a Master of Arts at Hollins University and, in 1994, a Master of Fine Arts in creative writing at Washington University in St. Louis, where he was taught by Stanley Elkin and William H. Gass. In the late 1990s and early 2000s, Ross worked as a feature writer and reviewer for the alternative weekly Nashville Scene. He received a two-book deal from Alfred A. Knopf in 2007; his first novel, Mr. Peanut, which Ross had been writing "on and off for 15 years", was published in 2010. A Hitchcockian true crime story about a video game designer whose wife is found dead with peanuts lodged in her throat, the novel is structured like a Möbius strip, forcing the reader to ascertain which events are real and which are guilty projections of its characters. In The New York Times, Michiko Kakutani called Mr. Peanut "a dark, dazzling and deeply flawed novel that announces the debut of an enormously talented writer". It was named one of the best books of the year by The New Yorker, The Philadelphia Inquirer, The New Republic, and The Economist. It has been translated into 16 languages.

Ross's collection of short stories, Ladies and Gentlemen, was featured in Kirkus Reviews's list of the best books of 2011. His nonfiction has appeared in The New York Times Book Review, The Daily Beast, and The Wall Street Journal. His most recent novel, Playworld, is a semiautobiographical account of a year in the life of a child actor; Ross has said it is about "the sometimes-fraught space that arises when adults and children find themselves consistently private".

In 2016, Ross was appointed editor of the literary journal The Sewanee Review. Subscriptions have risen under his tenure, and The New York Times has credited him with "restor[ing] some of the journal's cultural cachet."

Ross lives in Nashville, Tennessee, with his two daughters.

== Bibliography ==
- Mr. Peanut (2010, Alfred A. Knopf)
- Ladies and Gentlemen (2011, Alfred A. Knopf)
- Playworld (2025, Alfred A. Knopf)
