= José Claer =

Canadian poet and author (1963–2025)

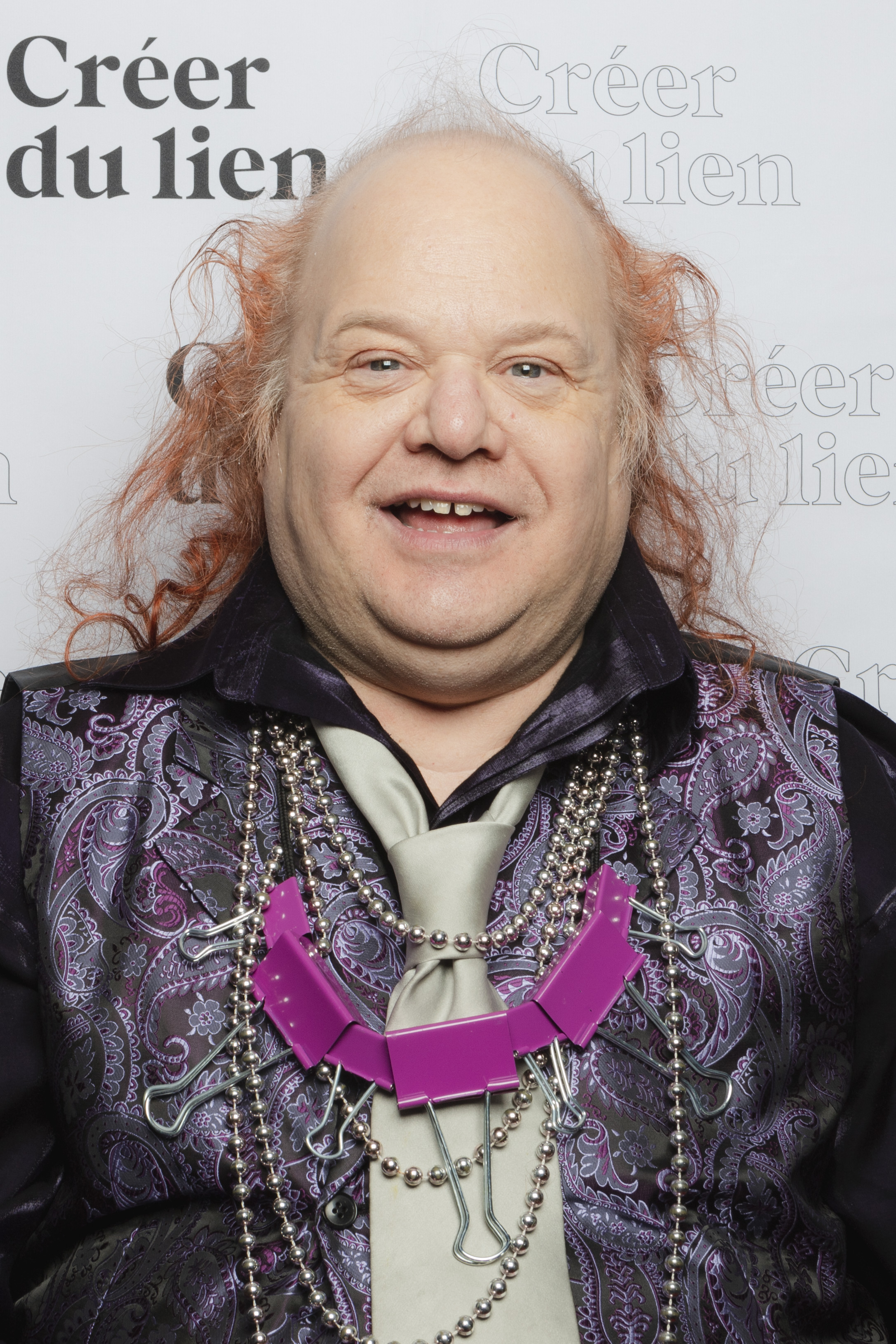
- Claer in 2023
- Born: 28 May 1963; Mont-Laurier, Quebec, Canada
- Died: 4 January 2025 (aged 61)
- Education: University of Ottawa (BA)
- Occupations: Poet; Author

Josué Jude Carrier (28 May 1963 – 4 January 2025), better known by his pen name José Claer, was a Canadian poet and author.

== Life and career ==
Born in Mont-Laurier on 28 May 1963, Claer wrote his first poems after reading Mary Ingalls in Échos Vedettes. At the age of 20, he submitted his first poems to Alain Stanké, who rejected them. Assigned female at birth, he transitioned in the 1990s. He earned a Bachelor of Arts in communications from the University of Ottawa.

While living in Gatineau, Claer had his first novel, Nue, un dimanche de pluie, published in 2001. In the 2010s, he returned to poetry, publishing works such as Squatteur d'imaginaire and Mordre jusqu'au sang dans le rouge à lèvres. In 2018, he participated in SlamOutaouais. In 2021, he was a finalist for the Prix du Conseil des arts et des lettres du Québec. In 2023, his work La Papesse woke was selected by the jury of Projet 3e œil.

In addition to his writing, Claer took part in an Opération Gareautrain campaign for suicide prevention and discussed the suicidal thoughts that haunted him prior to his transition. He also expressed his sexuality in many of his works.

Claer died on 4 January 2025, at the age of 61.

== Works ==
=== Novels ===
- Nue, un dimanche de pluie (2001)
- Les nymphéas s'endorment à cinq heures (2004)
- Ansi Soit-iel (2023)

=== Poetry ===
- Squatteur d'imaginaire (2010)
- À l'abattoir des anges (2012)
- Sortilège de l’œil (2013)
- À l'épicentre de l'éternité (2016)
- Requiem pour une muse perdue (with Chantal DesRochers, 2018)
- Mordre jusqu'au sang dans le rouge à lèvres (2019)
