= Breakneck: China's Quest to Engineer the Future =

2025 book

- Author: Dan Wang
- Publisher: W. W. Norton & Company
- Publication date: August 26, 2025
- Pages: 288 (first edition)
- ISBN: 1324106034

Breakneck: China's Quest to Engineer the Future is a nonfiction book by Dan Wang published by W. W. Norton & Company in August 2025. The book examines China's growing technological and geopolitical profile, contrasting it with the United States under the thesis that "America is run by lawyers, and China is run by engineers".

== Background ==
At the time of the book's publishing, Wang worked as a Hoover Institution research fellow and formerly as a technology analyst for Gavekal Dragonomics in China.

== Reception ==
In August 2025, Yuan Yi Zhu wrote in The Times that Breakneck was "easily one of the best books on China published this year", citing Wang's knowledge of the Chinese language and firsthand experience in China.

Writing for City Journal, Jordan McGillis gave a mixed review, praising Wang's depiction of China as "vivid, often autobiographical reporting delivers" but noting that "Wang’s account of China is compelling, but his treatment of America is less convincing", citing Wang's characterization of the Biden Administration's industrial policy.

Noah Smith wrote on his blog that Wang's arguments and examples are "very similar to those you’d find in Abundance or Why Nothing Works, making Breakneck a good companion to those other volumes."

Writing in The Wall Street Journal, Tunku Varadarajan described it as a "brilliant book—equal parts gripping and depressing."

== See also ==
- Abundance
- Chip War: The Fight for the World’s Most Critical Technology
- Made in China 2025
