= Let the Moon Wobble =

2025 poetry collection by Ally Ang

- Cover of first edition
- Author: Ally Ang
- Language: English
- Genre: Poetry
- Publisher: Alice James Books
- Publication date: November 11, 2025
- ISBN: 9781949944884

Let the Moon Wobble is a 2025 poetry collection by Ally Ang, published by Alice James Books. It is Ang's debut full-length collection.

== Reception ==
In World Literature Today, Candice Louisa Daquin wrote that Ang's collection brings "poetic subjects disquietingly close" and discussed its treatment of eroticism, history, and queer poetics.

In Bear Review, Sophie Bebeau described the book as "A Spell for the End of the World" and emphasized its focus on queerness, grief, pleasure, and political imagination.

== Awards ==
In 2026, Let the Moon Wobble was named a Barbara Gittings Literature Award Honor Book as part of the Stonewall Book Awards administered by the American Library Association's Rainbow Round Table.
