= Patriot (book) =

2024 book by Alexei Navalny

Patriot: A Memoir
- Author: Alexei Navalny
- Translator: Arch Tait and Stephen Dalziel
- Language: English
- Subject: Russian politics
- Genre: Memoir
- Published: October 22, 2024
- Publisher: Alfred A. Knopf (US); Bodley Head (UK)
- Publication place: United States, United Kingdom
- Media type: Hardcover
- Pages: 479
- ISBN: 978-0-5933-2096-9
- Preceded by: Opposing Forces

Patriot: A Memoir is a posthumous non-fiction book authored by Russian opposition leader Alexei Navalny and published by Alfred A. Knopf in October 2024. A self-described memoir, Patriot is Navalny's second book, following Opposing Forces (2016). Patriot details Navalny's life and career.

== Synopsis ==
In Patriot, Navalny details his life and career. The first portion of the book is in narrative form about his life and career, while the second portion is in the form of a prison memoir - some of it describing the boredom, isolation, and suffering living in such a prison, but also including reflections on a variety of topics, "from 19th century French literature to Billie Eilish". It also demonstrates his long fight against giving in to despair despite the authorities' punishments, and gives advice on how not to lose hope.

The book also includes a manifesto for transforming Russia, which include "free elections, a constitutional assembly, decentralisation, and a European orientation". The last entry in the memoir was made on January 17, 2024, a few weeks before his death.

== Writing ==
Navalny began writing Patriot in Germany after he was poisoned with the nerve agent Novichok in August 2020. He returned to Russia in February 2021, having written much of his memoir by that time, and he was arrested. Navalny was sentenced to 19 years in August 2023 on charges of extremism. In February 2024, he died at a penal colony in the Russian arctic.

== Editing and publication ==
Patriot was edited from Russian into English by Arch Tait and Stephen Dalziel.

Patriot was announced by Alfred A. Knopf and Navalny's widow, Yulia Navalnaya, on April 11, 2024. Navalnaya edited and finalized the manuscript with Knopf. On X, Navalnaya announced that Patriot had been translated into eleven languages, including a Russian-language edition.

Patriot was published on October 22, 2024 by Knopf in the United States and by Bodley Head (an imprint of Penguin in the UK). Yulia Navalnaya gave an interview to the BBC on the eve of its launch.

The book was published in Russian, but was not shipped to Russia. The Russian government-controlled and state media ignored its publication.

== Reception ==
Writing for The Guardian, Luke Harding praised the book as a "luminous account of Navalny’s life and dark times" and "a challenge from beyond the grave to Russia’s murder-addicted rulers".

Mikhail Zygar of Vanity Fair highlighted the difference in tone throughout the book, calling the first part light and humorous, while writing the prison diary was "horrifying, but impossible to stop reading".

In 2025, the book was declared an "extremist material" by the Russian justice ministry.
