= Éric Noël =

Canadian playwright

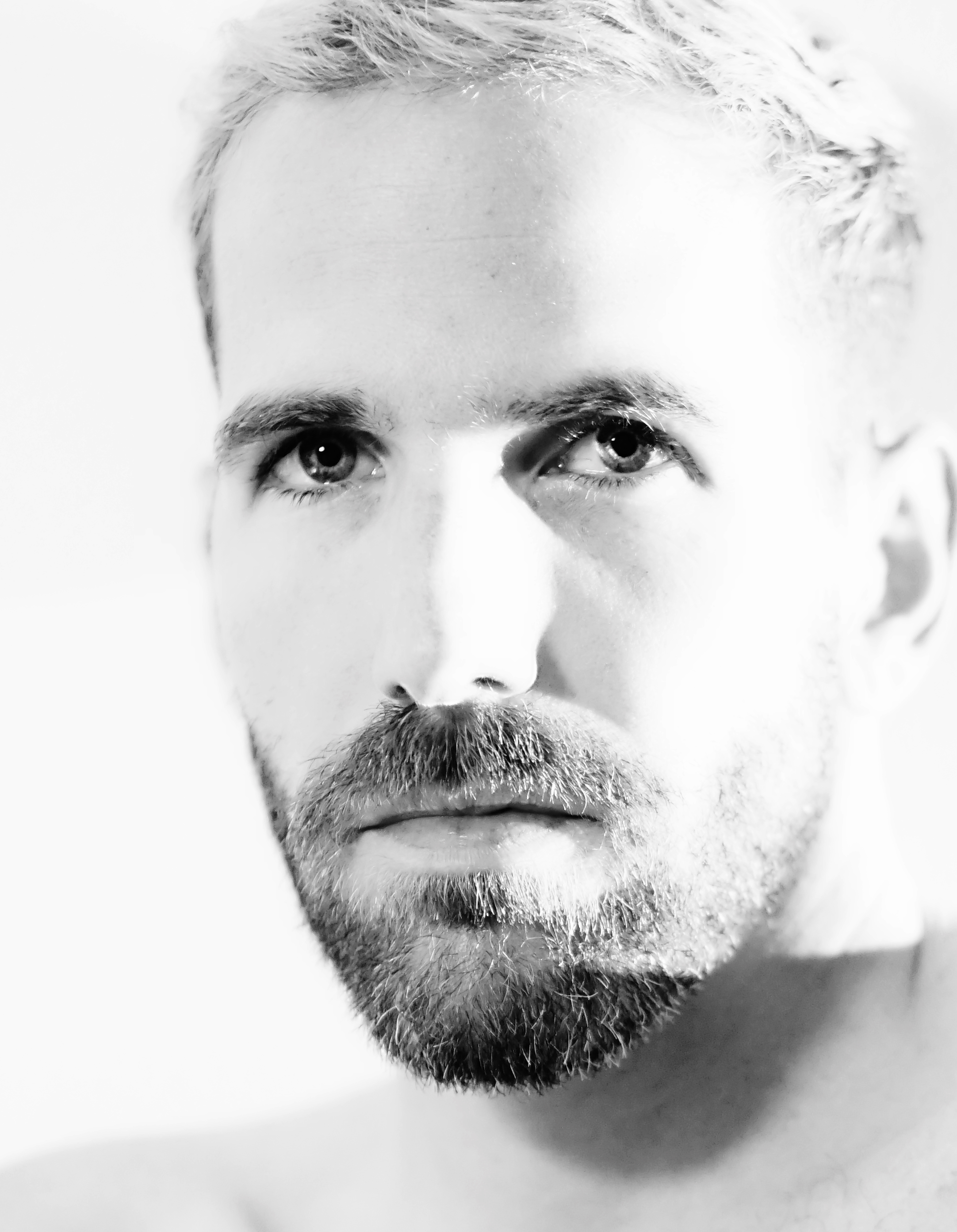
- Born: 1984 (age 41–42)
- Education: National Theatre School of Canada
- Occupations: Playwright; actor; theatre director
- Writing career
- Years active: 2000s–present

Éric Noël is a Canadian playwright from Quebec, who won the Governor General's Award for French-language drama at the 2025 Governor General's Awards for Ces regards amoureux de garçons altérés.

A 2009 graduate of the National Theatre School of Canada, Noël won the Prix Gratien-Gélinas in 2010 for the play manuscript Faire des enfants, which was staged by the Théâtre de Quat'Sous in 2011.

Ces regards amoureux de garçons altérés, a semi-autobiographical monologue about his experiences as a queer man exploring chemsex, debuted in a performance by Noël at the Festival du Jamais Lu in 2015, and French actor and director Stanislas Nordey staged a reading in Paris at the Théâtre Ouvert in 2016. Noël subsequently stopped using crystal meth and put the piece away for a number of years, until it received a new production in spring 2025 by Montreal's Theatre Prospero, with actor Gabriel Szabo performing the role.

Noël's other plays have included Sans électricité, les oiseaux disparaissent (2009), La Mère, le père, le petit et le grand (2012), Astéroïde B612 (2018), and L'Amoure Looks Something Like You (2023). Noël won the Prix Michel-Tremblay in 2024 for L'Amoure Looks Something Like You.

Noël is non-binary, and uses both male and gender-neutral pronouns.
