= A Journey in Service =

2025 autobiography of General Ibrahim Badamasi Babangida

- Author: Ibrahim Babangida
- Language: English
- Genre: Autobiography
- Published: February 2025
- Publication place: Nigeria
- Media type: Print
- Pages: 420

A Journey in Service is the 2025 autobiography of former Nigerian military president Ibrahim Badamasi Babangida. Released in February 2025, the memoir offers a comprehensive look into Babangida's life, from his early years to his tenure as Nigeria's leader, and provides insights into the nation's political evolution during his time in office.

In the book, Babangida expresses regret over the cancellation of the 1993 Nigerian presidential election, which was deemed to have been won by Moshood Abiola.

The book was dedicated to his parents, comrades in arms, and his wife, Maryam Babangida (née Okogwu). The book was published by BookCraft Africa. The advance from the publisher totalled ₦17 billion during its launch.

== Background and development ==
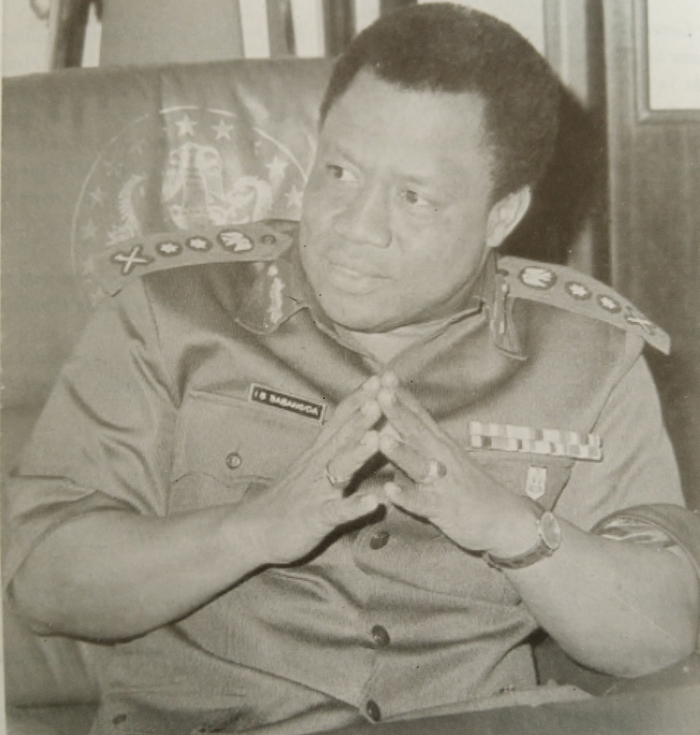
The military government of incumbent Ibrahim Babangida oversaw and later annulled the conduct of the election.

The publication of the memoir followed decades of speculation about Babangida's account of his role in Nigeria's political history, particularly his military presidency from 1985 to 1993.

The memoir has 420-pages and covers Babangida's early life in Minna, Nigeria, including his education at Gwari Native Authority Primary School and Provincial Secondary School in Bida, where he became head boy in his final year. It also recounts his interest in a military career and his military service, as well as events and controversies during his administration.

The decision to produce the memoir was influenced in part by associates such as Chidi Amuta and Yemi Ogunbiyi, who encouraged him to document his experiences.

He remained a major figure after his departure from office and became associated with several controversial issues, including the Assassination of Dele Giwa, a Nigerian journalist, and the cancellation of the 1993 Nigerian presidential election, which is deemed to have been won by Moshood Abiola (pp. 390-391).

"That accident of history is most regrettable. The nation is entitled to expect my expression of regret,"

— Babangida writes on 1993 results

The memoir also examines the January 1966 coups, with Babangida arguing that ethnic sentiments did not drive the plotters' original objectives. He discusses the role of officers from different ethnic groups in the coup and its aftermath, including the association of the plot with the Igbo community and the attacks that followed. The book also recounts the execution of his childhood friend, General Mamman Vatsa, and nine others in March 1986 following their conviction for plotting a coup (pp. 207–231). It details his deployment to the 1st Division under Colonel Mohammed Shuwa during the Nigerian Civil War, his role in military operations within Biafran territory, and his involvement in the 1975 Nigerian coup d'état.

== Content ==
- Early life and education: Babangida details his upbringing, including the loss of his parents at a young age. Babangida's interest in the military began from his time in school, where he was inspired by his teacher, Pa Onimole, and a career talk given by military officer Yakubu Gowon. He then joined the Nigerian Army. And changed his surname from Badamasi to Babangida because officers confused Badamasi with the Yoruba name "Gbadamosi", a question that was frequently asked during his official duties and at his military enlistment interview. Shortly after Nigeria's independence in 1960, he invited Gowon to give a talk about the benefits of a military career.
- He talked about his role in major coups in Nigeria, including the 1975 Nigerian coup d'état, where Murtala Mohammed came to power, and the coup in 1983, which led to the overthrow of Shehu Shagari. In 1985, Babangida came to power as the military president in Nigeria after a coup against Muhammadu Buhari.
- June 12 election and annulment: One of the most contentious episodes of Babangida's presidency was the annulment of the June 12, 1993, presidential election, widely regarded as free and fair, with Moshood Kashimawo Olawale (MKO) Abiola poised to win. In his memoir, Babangida reflects on this decision, acknowledging it as a challenging and painful moment in his leadership. He expresses regret over the annulment, recognizing its profound impact on Nigeria's democratic journey. In his speech addressing the June 12 election and annulment in 1992, Babangida said:

"And then, on June 16, without my knowledge or prior approval, National Economic Council (Nigeria) Chairman, Professor Humphrey Nwosu, announced the suspension of the June 12 election results ‘until further notice’. I knew instantly that certain fifth columnists were at work and that there was a need for extra care! And even after that suspension of the announcements of results, ABN obtained another ‘strange’ court order from Justice Saleh’s court in Abuja, stopping the release of the results of the elections…. On the morning of June 23, I left Abuja for Katsina to commiserate with the Yar’Adua family over the death of their patriarch, Alhaji Musa Yar’Adua. The funeral had taken place, and as I got ready to leave, a report filtered to me that the June 12 elections had been annulled. …Admiral Aikhomu’s press secretary, Nduka Irabor, had read out a terse, poorly worded statement from a scrap of paper, which bore neither the presidential seal nor the official letterhead of the government, annulling the June 12 presidential elections. I was alarmed and horrified. Yes, during the stalemate that followed the termination of the results announcement, the possibility of annulment that could lead to fresh elections was loosely broached in passing. But annulment was only a component of a series of other options. But to suddenly have an announcement made without my authority was, to put it mildly, alarming. I remember saying: ‘These nefarious ‘inside’ forces opposed to the elections have outflanked me!’ I would later find out that the ‘forces’ led by General Sani Abacha annulled the elections. There and then, I knew I was caught between ‘the devil and the deep blue sea’!! From then on, the June 12 elections took on a painful twist for which, as I will show later, I regrettably take responsibility."

— The Lagos Review

- Personal reflections: Apart from his life in politics, Babangida talks about his personal experiences, such as his marriage to Maryam Babangida.

== Release and reception ==
A Journey in Service was officially launched on February 20, 2025, at the Congress Hall of the Transcorp Hilton Hotel in Abuja. The event also served as a fundraiser for the IBB Presidential Library. Olusegun Obasanjo chaired the occasion, with President Bola Ahmed Tinubu as the special guest of honor. The keynote address was delivered by Nana Akufo-Addo, and the book was reviewed by Yemi Osinbajo. Other notable attendees included former Nigerian leaders Yakubu Gowon, Abdulsalami Abubakar, and Goodluck Jonathan. The event was marked by discussions on Nigeria's political history and Babangida's role in it.

The book launch event included financial contributions from several Nigerian business figures, totaling nearly ₦17 billion. Aliko Dangote pledged ₦8 billion, distributed as ₦2 billion annually over four years, while Abdul Samad Rabiu contributed ₦5 billion. T.Y. Danjuma committed ₦3 billion, and Arthur Eze donated ₦500 million. These funds were intended to support the development of the IBB Presidential Library, which aims to serve as a center for preserving Nigeria's arts, political, and military history.

Critical Reception

Prof Yemi Osinbajo, in his review, highlighted the book as a significant contribution to understanding Nigeria's political history. He noted that it offers insights into the complexities of governance and the challenges faced during Babangida's tenure.

Conversely, other critics argue that the autobiography serves more as a self-justification than a candid reflection. Olufunmike Imoiko, writing for The Lagos Review, described the memoir as an attempt to sanitize Babangida's controversial role in Nigeria's history. She points out that while the book presents his version of events, it often sidesteps or downplays the more contentious aspects of his rule, such as the annulment of the June 12 election and the economic hardships resulting from SAP. Similarly, Festus Adedayo, in the Nigerian Tribune, critiqued the memoir for omitting certain harsh realities Nigerians faced during Babangida's regime. He suggests that while the book covers various events of his administration, it fails to fully acknowledge the negative impacts of certain policies and decisions.

== Controversy ==
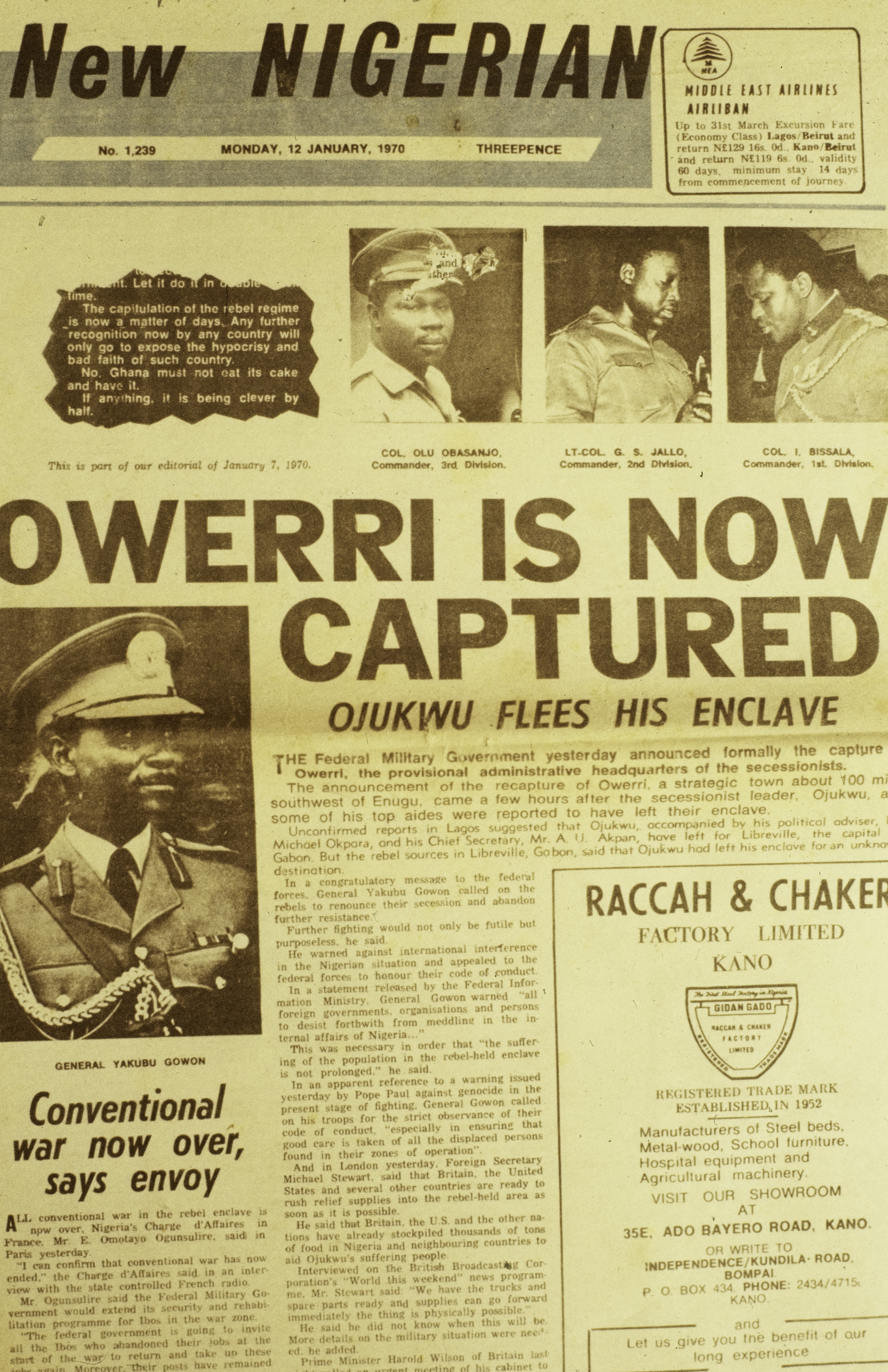
New Nigerian newspaper page 7 January 1970. End of the Nigerian civil war with Biafra.

The release of A Journey in Service generated debate, particularly regarding his depiction of the January 1966 coup. In the memoir, Babangida states that the coup was not orchestrated by the Igbo ethnic group, presenting a perspective that differs from some historical narratives. This claim prompted responses from various groups, including Ohanaeze Ndigbo, a prominent Igbo socio-cultural organization.

In his book, Babangida claimed that the coup was not ethnically motivated. Stating that purpose of the coup was to secure the release of Obafemi Awolowo and make him a provisional executive leader. In addition, Babangida pointed out the role played by an Igbo officer, Major John Obienu, in crushing the coup. Babangida claimed that some senior Igbo officers were killed during the coup.

Regarding these claims by Babangida, the Ohanaeze organization demanded an apology and ₦10 trillion in compensation from the Nigerian government, led by President Bola Tinubu. The organization claimed that the coup and subsequent events led to the suffering of the Igbo population. The civil war and the deaths of an estimated three million lives, most of whom were civilians, are examples of the suffering caused by the coup. The organization also claimed that these events were related to the history of injustices suffered by the Igbo population in Nigeria. Similarly, the Njiko Igbo Forum, an affiliate of Ohanaeze, advocated for ₦100 trillion in reparations, highlighting the economic and social impact of historical narratives surrounding the coup.

Babangida’s account in the memoir also drew a response from human rights lawyer Femi Falana, who said he was considering taking legal action over the claims made in the book. Falana, who was arrested and detained in 1993 over his protests against the annulment of the election results, said that the comments by Babangida support his long-held view that the election was unjustly annulled. Falana further noted that his prosecution was unwarranted and a violation of his human rights, which in itself was a reflection of the arrests and detentions of pro-democracy activists at the time.
