= Katia Belkhodja =

Canadian writer

Katia Belkhodja (born 1986) is an Algerian Canadian writer from Quebec, whose novel Les déterées was the winner of the Governor General's Award for French-language fiction at the 2025 Governor General's Awards.

Born in Algeria, she emigrated to Canada with her family in childhood. She published her debut novel, Le peau des doigts, in 2008, and followed up with La marchande de sable in 2015. In 2023 she was selected for the Writers' Trust of Canada's Rising Stars program for emerging writers, with a mentorship from writer Catherine Leroux.

She also teaches French literature at the CÉGEP level.
