= Aria Aber =

German-Afghan poet (born 1991)

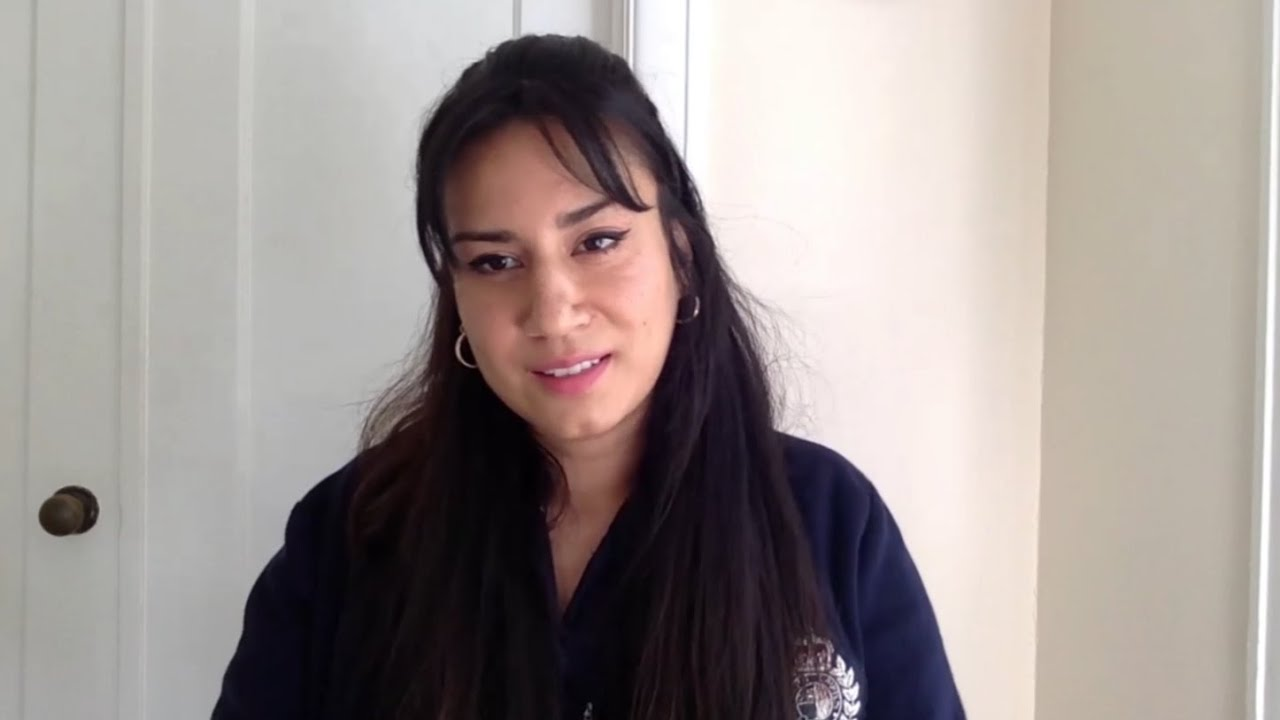
- Aber in 2020
- Born: 1991 (age 34–35); Münster, Germany
- Education: Goldsmiths, University of London; New York University
- Occupations: Poet; novelist
- Spouse: Noah Warren
- Website: ariaaber.com

Aria Aber (/ˈɑːriə ˈɑːbər/; born 1991) is a German-born poet and novelist based in the United States.

== Early life and education ==
Aber was born and raised in Münster, Germany, to Afghan refugees. Aber moved to London in 2011 and graduated from Goldsmiths, University of London in 2015 with a Bachelor of Arts (BA) in English literature. She later completed a Master of Fine Arts (MFA) in Poetry at New York University.

== Career ==
Aber's poems have appeared in The New Yorker, The New Republic, and The Kenyon Review.

Aber has received awards and fellowships from Kundiman, the Wisconsin Institute of Creative Writing, and the Whiting Foundation. Aber was the spring 2020 Li Shen Visiting Writer at Mills College. She was formerly a Stegner Fellow in Poetry at Stanford University.

Aber is a faculty member of the University of Vermont as an assistant professor of Creative Writing and resides between Vermont and Brooklyn.

=== Hard Damage ===
Aber's first full-length collection, Hard Damage, which won the Prairie Schooner Book Prize in Poetry, was published in September 2019 by University of Nebraska Press.

In a review at the Los Angeles Review of Books, Claire Schwartz wrote, "Hard Damage—which elaborates a constellation of beauty and terror between Afghanistan, Germany, and the United States—is vexed by the meanings of bringing across."

In an interview at The Yale Review, Aber has stated, "Especially the English language is political, because it has operated as a colonizing force in many places around the world, and changed global indigenous languages forever, if not completely eradicated them. If poetry is 'the soul of a nation' (this quote is attributed to T.S. Eliot, though I cannot fact-check the source), and our nation is an empire actively participating in displacement and warfare, it feels only natural to me that these topics surface in poetry."

=== Good Girl ===
Aber's debut novel Good Girl was published by Hogarth in 2025. The novel follows a young German-Afghan woman in Berlin's party scene. It was shortlisted for the Women's Prize for Fiction and the inaugural New Adult Book Prize.

== Personal life ==
Aber is married to Canadian-American writer Noah Warren; their wedding was officiated by Louise Glück, who was one of Aber's teachers at the Stegner Fellowship.

== Bibliography ==
=== Poetry ===
Collections

- Aber, Aria (2019). Hard damage. University of Nebraska Press.

List of poems

Title	Year	First published	Reprinted/collected
Dirt and light	2021	Aber, Aria (March 29, 2021). "Dirt and light". The New Yorker. 97 (6): 41.	

=== Fiction ===
Novels

- Aber, Aria (2025). Good girl. Hogarth Press.
