= Apple in China =

2025 book by Patrick McGee

Apple in China: The Capture of the World's Greatest Company
- Cover art
- Author: Patrick McGee
- Language: English
- Publisher: Scribner (USA)
- Publication date: 13 May 2025
- Publication place: USA
- Pages: 448 (first edition)
- ISBN: 978-1-6680-5337-9

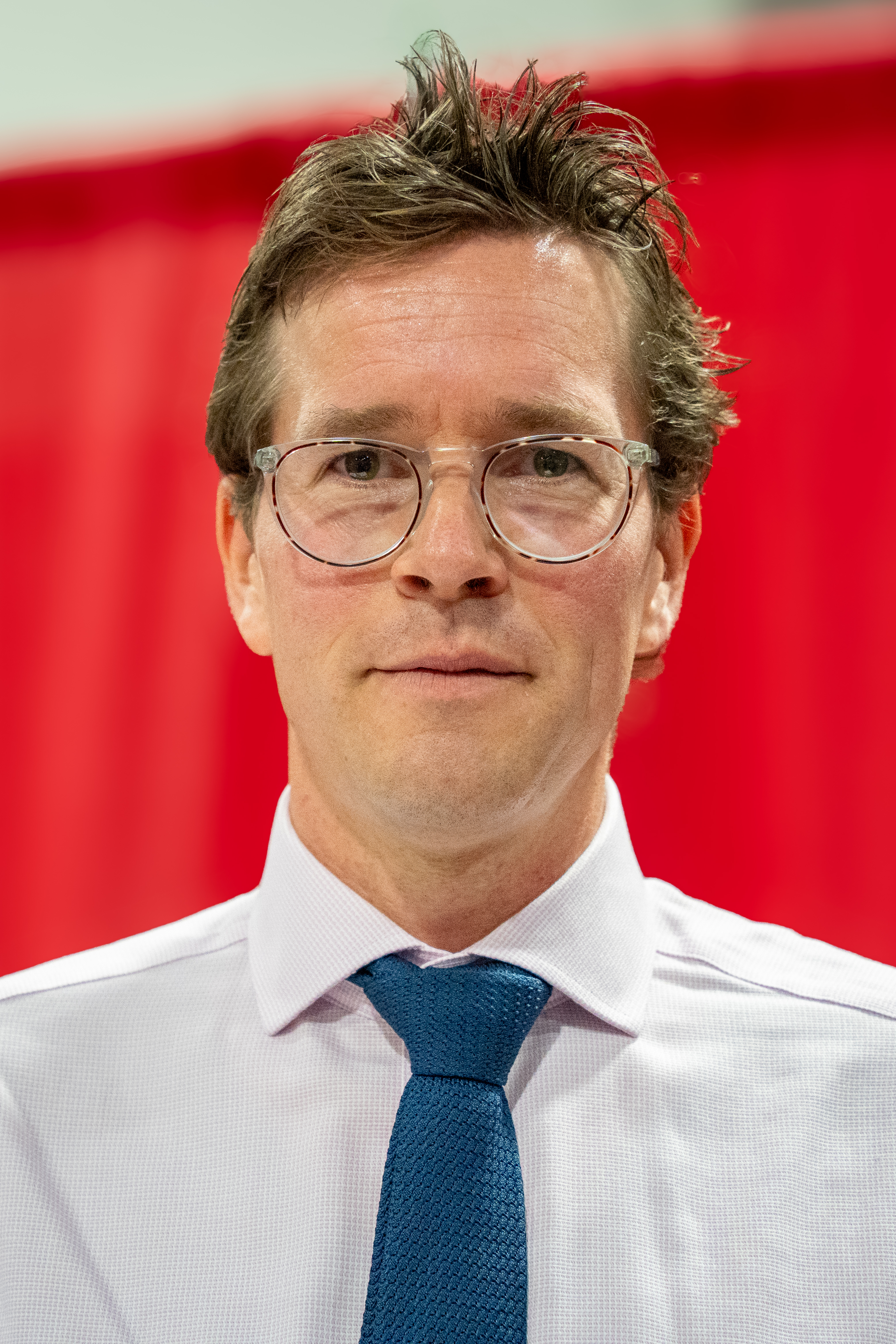
Patrick McGee at the National Book Festival 2025

Apple in China is a 2025 book by Patrick McGee about how Apple Inc. invested in China in order to build iPhones and other technology, and by doing so helped China become more competitive.

== Publication history ==
Patrick McGee is a journalist who worked for the Financial Times between 2013 and 2023. During his time at the newspaper, he worked in Hong Kong, Germany, and then California, with a focus on tech relations between China and the United States as well as global supply chains. Between 2019 and 2023, he was the principal reporter covering Apple Inc. for the paper, before taking a two-year sabbatical to write the book. Before becoming a reporter, he earned degrees in religious studies at the University of Toronto and in global diplomacy from SOAS University of London.

== Summary ==
In the book, McGee says that, under the leadership of Tim Cook, Apple invested $275 billion in China between 2016 and 2021, to manufacture its products in the country (including building factories and supply chains in China, as well as training Chinese workers). McGee compares this to the Marshall Plan, as this is in excess of other corporate spending and, in real terms, was about twice the monetary value of the Marshall Plan. Beyond the monetary value, he also argues that this represented "an epic transfer of knowledge", that significantly boosted the Chinese government's Made in China 2025 plan to become a global tech superpower. He then argues that the company's massive investment into China had the effect of making the company over-reliant on China, in turn making in vulnerable to pressure from the authoritarian Chinese government. In an interview with Rest of World, McGee stated that "my argument is essentially that Apple is playing the role of Prometheus handing the Chinese the gift of fire."

== Critical reception ==
=== Acclaim ===
Kirkus Reviews reviewed the book as "a well-argued, eye-opening look at the dark side of globalism, and those who win and lose because of it".

In a review for The New York Times, journalist Hannah Beech called Apple in China "smart and comprehensive", praising Patrick McGee's clever and chronologically organized timeline of how Apple's expansion to China manufacturing facilities under then COO Tim Cook created a global success but also an "existential vulnerability" for the United States. She states in the review that the book author argues "China wouldn’t be China today without Apple". Tom Knowles of The Daily Telegraph gave the book four out of five stars, calling it an "eye-opening exposé" of the "lucrative relationship stained by manipulation, violence and abuse" between Apple and China's authoritarian regime.

Jacob Silverman of The Washington Post wrote that the book was "occasionally dry", but "also an insightful account of how a powerful company might be 'captured' by the lucrative temptations of the ultimate labor and consumer market".

=== Criticism ===
In a statement to Vanity Fair, Apple Inc. claimed that the book was "full of inaccuracies".

In his May 20, 2025, review for The China Academy, Chen Jing, a manufacturing observer, argues the story is "greatly exaggerated", challenging the claim that Apple single-handedly empowered China. He disputes the $55 billion annual investment figure as overstated and questions the Marshall Plan comparison, suggesting a Western bias that credits American companies for China's rise while ignoring its internal capabilities.
