= Chronicle of Drifting =

2025 debut poetry collection by Yuki Tanaka

- Author: Yuki Tanaka
- Publisher: Copper Canyon Press
- Publication date: April 15, 2025
- Pages: 80
- ISBN: 9781556597053

Chronicle of Drifting is a 2025 debut poetry collection by Yuki Tanaka, published by Copper Canyon Press. In The Adroit Journal, Tanaka stated that Italo Calvino's idea of "lightness," or fluid, agile movement through the world, was crucial to his book's writing.

== Critical reception ==
Ed Simon, writing for the Poetry Foundation, observed Tanaka's relationship to Japanese surrealism vis-à-vis "his adherence to subtly uncanny dream logic" and "use of the ambiguous simile, the metaphor in which tenor and vehicle are not completely yoked to one another, or at least not conventionally so." In conclusion, Simon lauded Tanaka's aestheticism and the wisdom of his craft.

Tianyi, for the Los Angeles Review of Books, noted Tanaka's surreal, transformative writing in the liminal space between life and afterlife, concluding that "By the end of Chronicle of Drifting, we find a still-wild corner of the deep dream, a private room that continues the conversation, a hidden pasture where the river flows beyond its final boundaries."
