= Maximum Summer =

2025 debut poetry collection

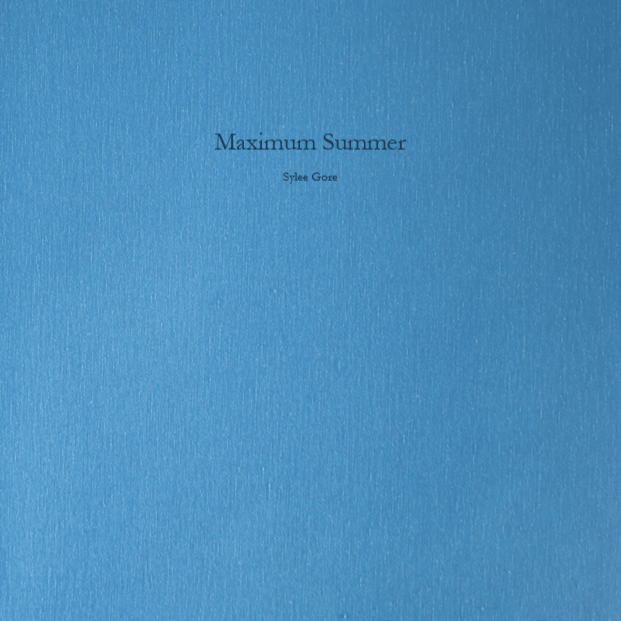
- Author: Sylee Gore
- Publisher: Nion Editions
- Publication date: March 24, 2025
- Pages: 44
- ISBN: 9781945129094

Maximum Summer is a 2025 debut poetry collection by Sylee Gore, published by Nion Editions. The book was published after Gore won the 2022 Queen Mary Wasafiri New Writing Prize in Fiction.

== Critical reception ==
Leonora Simonovis, writing for the Poetry Foundation, observed Gore's poems about birth and motherhood, stating that "In a strong, lyrical voice, Gore delivers short, image-driven scenes that give an account of the speaker’s physical and emotional experiences as a new mother."

The London Magazine called the book "an ambitious pamphlet, grappling with questions concerning the epistemological, metaphysical and political" and lauded Gore's ability to make intimacy out of the abstract.
