= Gavekal =

Hong Kong financial services company

Gavekal, Inc.
- Type: Private
- Industry: Financial services
- Founded: 1999; 27 years ago
- Founders: Louis-Vincent Gave; Charles Gave; Anatole Kaletsky; Arthur Kroeber
- Headquarters: Central Plaza, Wan Chai, Hong Kong
- Key people: Louis-Vincent Gave (CEO); Anatole Kaletsky (Chief Economist)
- Products: Financial research; Investment management; Wealth management; Software development
- AUM: US$2.4 billion (2023)
- Website: web.gavekal.com

Gavekal is a financial services company headquartered in Hong Kong. It provides macroeconomic research, investment analysis, and investment management services.

== History ==
=== Founding and early development (1999–2003) ===
Gavekal was founded in 1999 by Louis-Vincent Gave, Charles Gave, and Anatole Kaletsky. It was originally established as a research provider focused on Asian financial markets for institutional investors.

The firm was originally based in London before relocating its headquarters to Hong Kong in 2001.

In 2003, Gavekal expanded into investment management with the launch of its first investment fund.

=== Expansion and investment management growth (2008–2013) ===
In 2008, Gavekal formed a joint venture with Marshall Wace, creating Marshall Wace GaveKal Asia, based in Hong Kong and led by Louis-Vincent Gave. The venture combined Gavekal’s macroeconomic research focus with Marshall Wace’s investment management expertise.

The partnership expanded significantly, with assets under management increasing from approximately $300 million to over $1.3 billion, and the launch of multiple strategies including Japan-focused hedge funds and Chinese bond products.

The joint venture was dissolved in 2013, with Marshall Wace retaining long/short strategies and Gavekal retaining long-only funds.

=== Dragonomics acquisition and diversification (2011–2015) ===
In 2011, Gavekal acquired Dragonomics, a Beijing-based China research firm founded by Arthur Kroeber. The combined entity was renamed Gavekal Dragonomics.

In 2015, Gavekal acquired a minority stake in French rugby club Union Bordeaux Bègles, reflecting diversification beyond financial services.

== Market views and outlook ==
In January 2024, it stated that Chinese equities offered strong global value despite several years of underperformance.

In March 2024, it warned that tightening global liquidity conditions could increase volatility across risk assets.

In January 2025, Gavekal research projected that the Indian rupee could weaken beyond ₹90 per US dollar during the year, citing reduced policy intervention and external balance pressures.
