= Poems & Prayers =

2025 book by Matthew McConaughey

- First edition cover
- Author: Matthew McConaughey
- Language: English
- Genre: Poetry
- Publisher: Crown Publishing Group
- Publication date: September 16, 2025
- Publication place: United States
- Media type: Print (hardcover), e-book, audio
- Pages: 208
- ISBN: 978-1-9848-6210-5

Poems & Prayers is a collection of poetry by the American author and actor Matthew McConaughey, first published by Crown on September 16, 2025. The collection features McConaughey's reflections on life, including on faith and relationships. It received mostly positive reviews for its authenticity and ability to connect with readers but some criticism regarding the quality of the poems.

== Conception ==
In an interview with Variety, McConaughey spoke about his reason for writing the book as a way of dealing with cynicism, stating: "I noticed myself becoming cynical. In people, leaders, in reality—even myself—not believing in them, and us, as much as I want to." Poems & Prayers is his second book, after the 2020 memoir Greenlights.

== Reception ==
Writing for Texas Monthly, Dina Gachman wrote: "The poems may not win a Pulitzer, but he's well intentioned, dammit." In a review for The Washington Post, Mark Athitakis described the poems as "filled with elliptical, self-cancelling statements that confuse wordplay with meaning". Athitakis, however, praised the authenticity of the work and McConaughey's reflection on the passage of time as a major theme.
