= Dan Wang =

Canadian technology analyst and writer

- Education: University of Rochester (BA)
- Website: danwang.co

Dan Wang is a Canadian technology analyst and writer, specializing in contemporary China. Wang has been an analyst at Gavekal Dragonomics, a visiting scholar at the Yale Law School's Paul Tsai China Center, and a research fellow at the Hoover Institution.

Wang has commented extensively on U.S.-China relations through the lens of technology, including semiconductor manufacturing and social media. In August 2025, his book Breakneck: China's Quest to Engineer the Future was released.

== Early life and education ==
Wang was born in Yunnan, China. He was raised in Canada, where his family lived in both Ottawa and Toronto. As a teenager, he participated in the Royal Canadian Army Cadet program in Ottawa.

Wang later moved to the United States. He studied economics and philosophy at the University of Rochester, graduating in 2014.

== Annual letters ==
Based in China from 2017 to 2023, Wang publishes annual letters on China's economy, technological development, and culture. Wang's letters most recently focused on the impact of COVID-19 on the Chinese economy, and Chinese expatriates in Thailand.

== Publications ==
- Breakneck: China's Quest to Engineer the Future (2025)
