= Fang Lina =

Author

方丽娜 Lina Fang
- Born: 5 March 1966 (age 60); Shangqiu, China
- Education: Danube University Krems
- Occupation: Writer
- Writing career
- Subjects: Prose; Fiction

Lina Fang (born 5 March 1966) is a writer who resides in Vienna. She is a council member of the European Chinese Writers Association and the founder of the Austrian Chinese Writers' Association.

== Biography ==
Fang Lina was born on 5 March 1966 in Shangqiu, Henan. She pursued a master's degree in Business Administration at Danube University Krems in Austria. Currently residing in Vienna, she has attended advanced studies at the Lu Xun Academy of Literature as a member of the 13th Advanced Writers' Workshop. She is now a special correspondent and literary editor for Europe Times [zh].

== Writing ==
Fang Lina's novels and essays frequently have appeared in Writer, October, Chinese Writers, Hong Kong literature, Beijing Literature – Mid-length Fiction Monthly, Original Edition of Fiction Monthly, Prose Selections, Prose Hundred, and Overseas Digest.

== Works ==
The essay collections The Poetic Distance and Blue Nostalgia, as well as the short story collection The Village Where Butterflies Fly, have been included in the series New Century Overseas Chinese Women Writers and New Forces in Chinese Literature: Selected Fiction by Overseas Chinese Women Writers, respectively.
