= University of Bamberg =

University

- Otto-Friedrich-Universität Bamberg
- Latin: Universitas Bambergensis
- Type: Public
- Established: 1647; 379 years ago (initial); 1972 (re-founded)
- Budget: € 105.1 million
- Chancellor: Dagmar Steuer-Flieser
- President: Kai Fischbach
- Academic staff: 821
- Administrative staff: 660
- Students: 11,000
- Location: Bamberg, Bavaria, Germany; 49°53′38″N 10°53′12″E
- Website: uni-bamberg.de/en

The University of Bamberg (German: Otto-Friedrich-Universität Bamberg) in Bamberg, Germany, specializes in the humanities, cultural studies, social sciences, economics, and applied computer science.

== History ==
The history of the University of Bamberg dates back to 1647, when the Academia Bambergensis was founded, initially focusing on philosophy and theology. In 1773, it was expanded into the Universitas Ottoniano-Fridericiana, also offering law and medicine. However, following secularization in 1803, the institution was reduced to a Lyzeum, losing its law and medical faculties. In 1923, the institution transitioned into the Philosophisch-Theologische Hochschule, continuing its focus on philosophy and theology. Parallel to this, between 1958 and 1972, the Pädagogische Hochschule (School of Education) operated as a separate entity of the University of Würzburg. Both institutions were united in 1972 (Gesamthochschule). This transition ended in 1979 by officially (re-)attaining university status. Further advancements followed in the 21st century, with the establishment of the Department of Information Systems and Applied Informatics (WIAI) in October 2001. In August 2012, the university expanded with the opening of a new building at the location of the former Regional Garden Show 2012.

== Organization ==
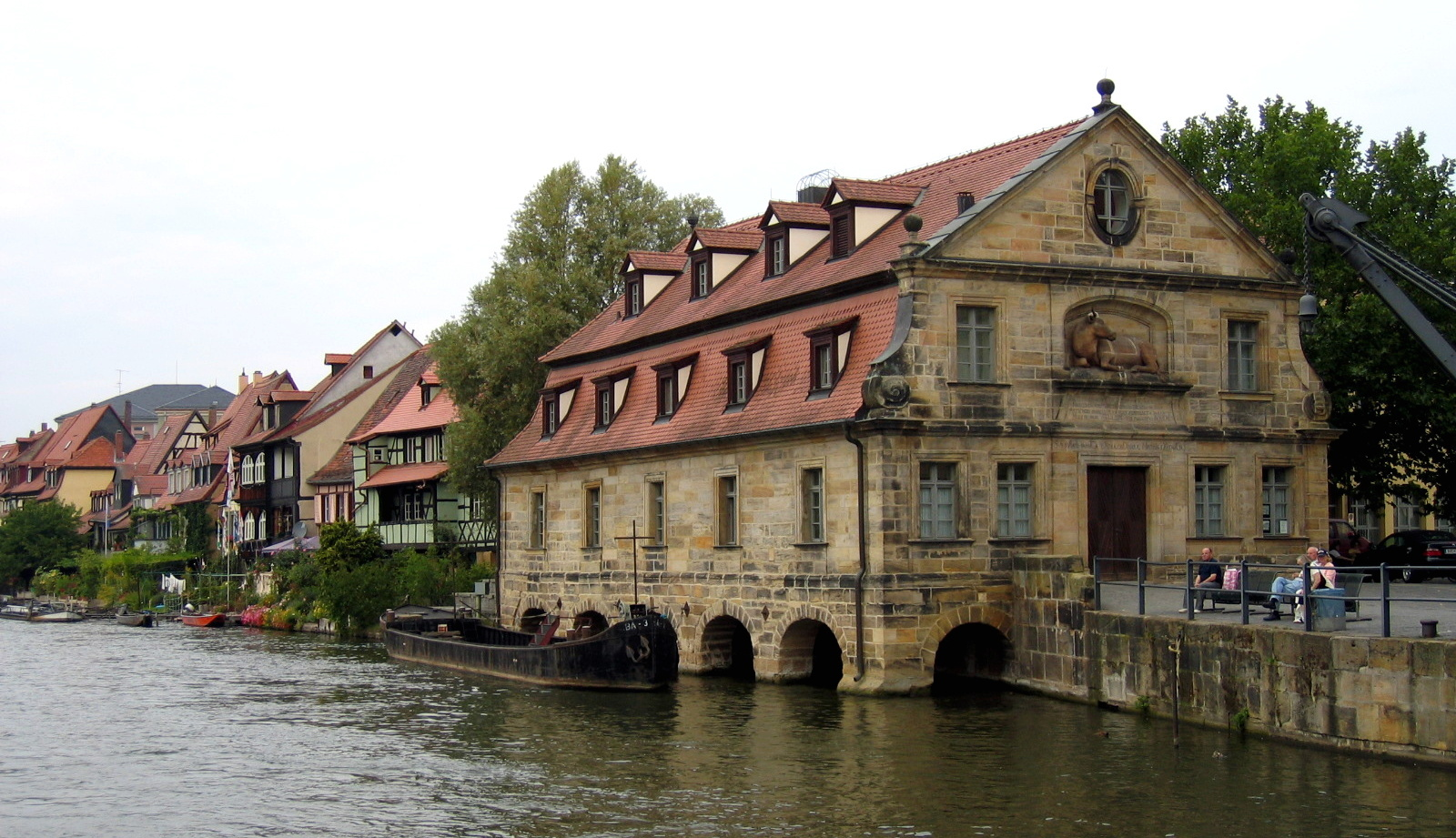
A former slaughter house which accommodates the Institute of Geography today

The university today has four faculties:

- Faculty of Humanities
- Faculty of Social Sciences, Economics and Business Administration
- Faculty of Human Sciences and Education
- Faculty of Information Systems and Applied Computer Science

An agreement between Bavaria and the Vatican saw the faculty of Catholic Theology restructured as an institute which places a greater emphasis on teacher training. In 2005, the Social Work course transferred to Coburg University of Applied Sciences.

== Academics ==
=== Disciplines ===
- Language-based area studies, including Oriental Studies and Slavonic Studies
- Medieval Studies; Archaeology (Prehistoric, Roman Provinces, Medieval); Cultural Heritage Conservation
- Behavioural sciences: Sociology, Political Science, Psychology
- Economics and Business Administration, with an emphasis on European Economics
- Computer Science

The main areas of curricular focus, to which subjects across faculties contribute, are:

- Education and Life Planning
- The Individual and Society
- Languages and Cultures
- Business and Markets

=== Rankings and reputation ===
In the 2012 Wirtschaftswoche ranking, the Faculty of Social Sciences, Economics, and Business Administration is ranked 20th in business administration (Betriebswirtschaftslehre) and 11th in economics (Volkswirtschaftslehre).

=== Partner universities ===
The University of Bamberg currently has cooperation agreements with approximately 300 academic institutions in more than 60 countries (March 2018).

The European network includes the University of Cambridge and the University of Oxford. The University holds partnerships in Australia with the University of Sydney, in the US with Harvard University, as well as in Asia with the Chinese Xi'an Jiaotong University, the Korea University, and the Japanese Sophia University.

== Campus ==
University of Bamberg Campus
University of Bamberg Campus Locations
1 Feldkirchenstraße 21 / F21 (Social Sciences & Economics, Audimax)
2 An der Weberei 5 / WE5 (Computer & Communication Sciences, Art, Music, ERBA)
3 Marcus House, Markusplatz 3 / M3 (Human Sciences & Education)
4 An der Universität 5 / U5 (Humanities)
5 An der Universität 2 / U2 (Theology & Philosophy)
6 Kapuzinerstraße 16 / K16 (Central administration)
7 Dominikanerstraße 2a (Aula, Assembly Hall)
8 Markusstraße 8a / MG1+MG2 (Markus Grounds)
9 Am Kranen/Fischstr. / KR+FI
10 TB 1 (Theology & Philosophy, An der Universität 2)
11 TB 2 (Human Sciences, Markusplatz 3)
12 TB 3 / Central Library (Social Sciences & Economics, Feldkirchenstraße 21)
13 TB 4 (Languages & Literature, Heumarkt 2)
14 TB 5 (History & Geo Sciences, Am Kranen 3)
15 ERBA Library (Computer & Communication Sciences, Art, Music)
16 Canteen Feldkirchenstraße
17 Canteen Austraße
18 Cafe Markusgelände
19 Cafe ERBA

The university is divided into three main campuses: the downtown campus spread throughout the city with the Assembly Hall and Marcus grounds, Feldkirchenstraße with the Audimax, and ERBA with computer science and communication/music sciences departments.

=== Downtown Campus ===
The university is partly housed in historical buildings in Bamberg's Old Town. These include the former Jesuit college (Theology), the former Hochzeitshaus (History), the old slaughterhouse (Earth Science), and the former fire station (Oriental Studies). The departments of Languages and Literature are partly housed in buildings which once belonged to the Kaiser-Heinrich High School.

=== Marcus Grounds ===
Since 1988, the Department of Human Sciences has been located in the former women's hospital at Marcus Plaza (Marcus House named after Adalbert Friedrich Marcus). In the winter semester 2011/12, a new building was inaugurated on adjacent Marcus Street, featuring a lecture hall with 400 seats and 17 seminar rooms totaling 560 seats, as well as a cafe.

=== Feldkirchenstraße (Feki) ===
The Social Sciences and Economics Department, which accommodates a large proportion of the students, are in Feldkirchenstrasse. The central building comprises several lecture halls including the Audimax. The central library, the university's data center, and a canteen are also located there.

=== ERBA ===
In 2012, the university was expanded with a new building: the Department of Computer Science and the Institute for Communication Science relocated to the grounds of the former Erlangen-Bamberg (ERBA) cotton mill at the northern end of the island city. In a formerly industrially-used brick building, approximately 300 student apartments were constructed in the immediate vicinity.

=== University Sports Center ===
The current sports center with facilities is located on Feldkirchenstraße. Beginning in 2023, the former swimming hall on Margaretendamm will be converted into the new University Sports Center.

=== Canteens ===
There are two canteens (one on Feldkirchenstraße and one in the center on Austraße) and three cafes (one on ERBA, one at Marcus Plaza, and one in the Feki canteen), all operated by the Würzburg Student Services.

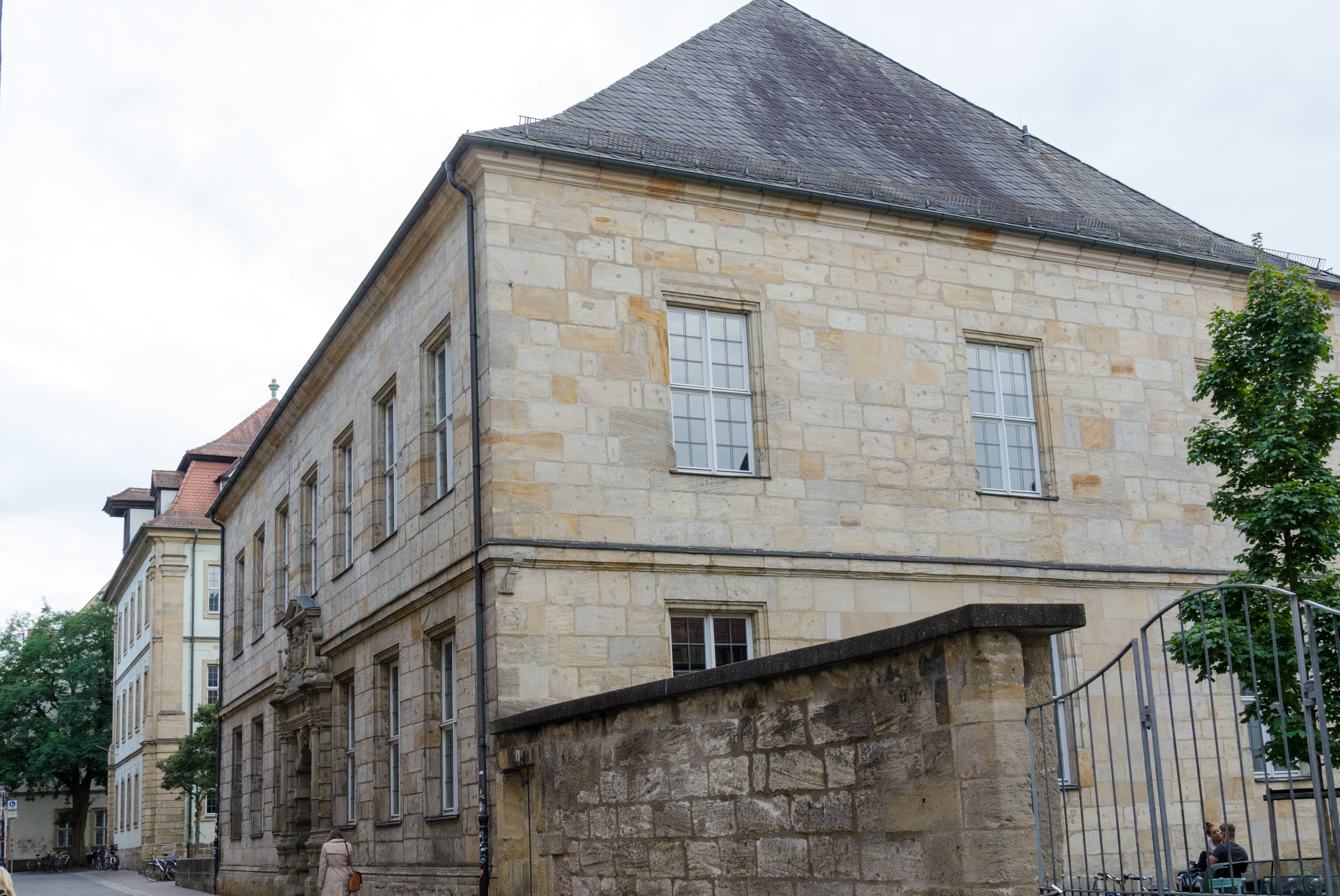
An der Universität 7

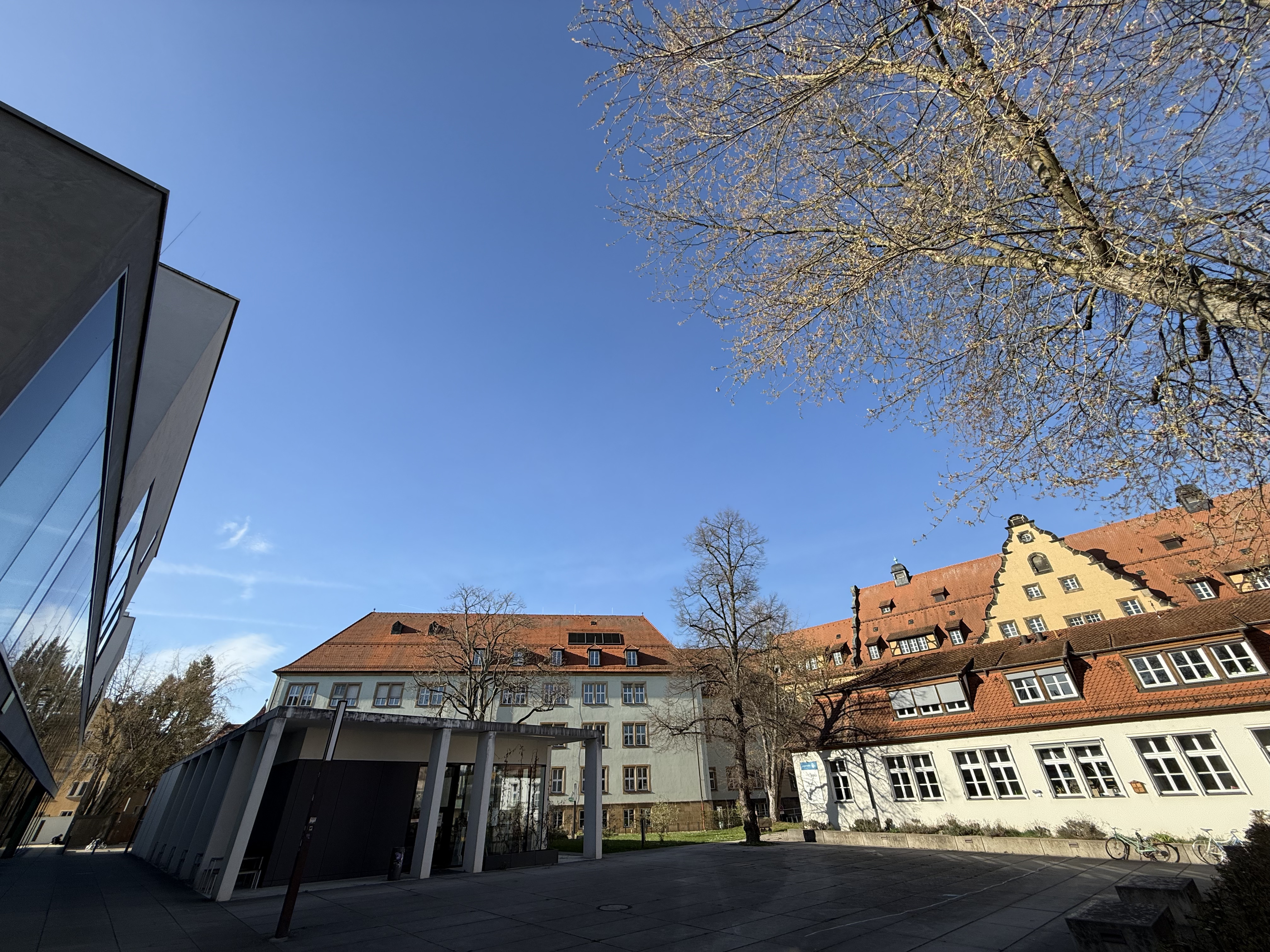
Marcus Grounds: Human Sciences

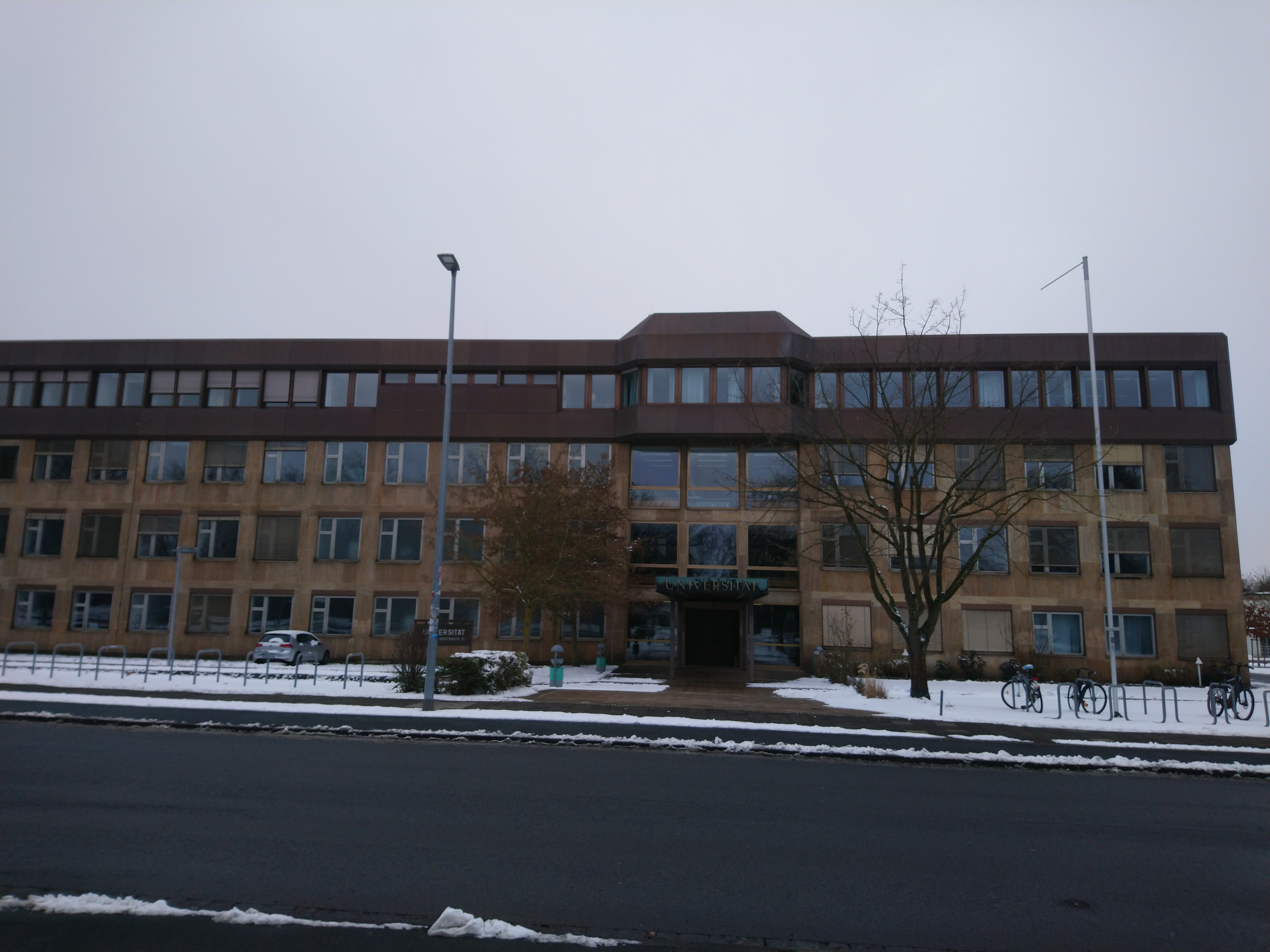
Feki: Social Sciences and Economics

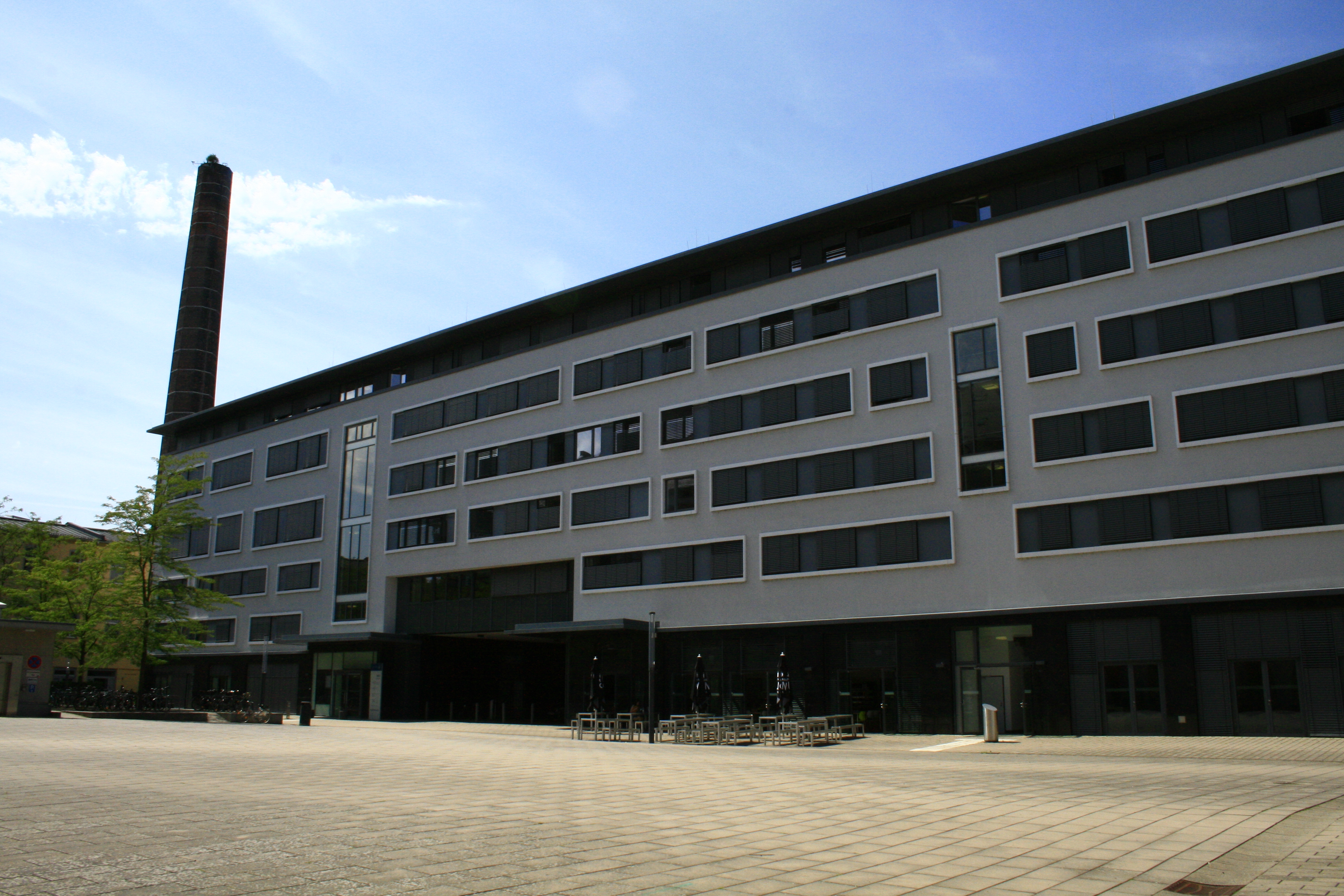
ERBA: Music, Communication and Computer Science

== Johann Baptist von Spix International Professorship ==
The University of Bamberg created the Johann Baptist von Spix professorship in 2015. The professorship is named for an alumnus of the university and eminent biologist and ethnographer. The professorship was created in an effort to increase the institution's international scholarly collaboration. Recipients of the professorship teach a class, conduct research, provide professional development opportunities to graduate students, and offer public presentations.

== Notable faculty ==
- Thomas Weißer, ethics
- Gerhard Vinken, heritage conservation
- Dietrich Dörner, theoretical psychology

== Notable alumni ==
- Riccardo Basile, German television presenter
- Lisa Badum, member of the Bundestag
- Nabila Espanioly, Palestinian-Israeli clinical psychologist and activist
- Alexander Filipović, German ethicist, focusing on media and the digital transformation
- Meinolf Finke, German writer and poet
- Nora-Eugenie Gomringer, German and Swiss poet and writer
- Tommy Jaud, German author
- Brigitte Mohn, German businesswoman and entrepreneur
- Wolf-Dieter Montag, German physician, sports medicine specialist, mountain rescue doctor, and international sports administrator
- Franz Naegele, German obstetrician
- Ursula Reutner, German linguist
- Andreas Röschlaub, German physician
- Corine Schleif, professor and art historian
- You Xie, Chinese-German politician, journalist and author
- Emmi Zeulner, member of the Bundestag

== Gallery ==
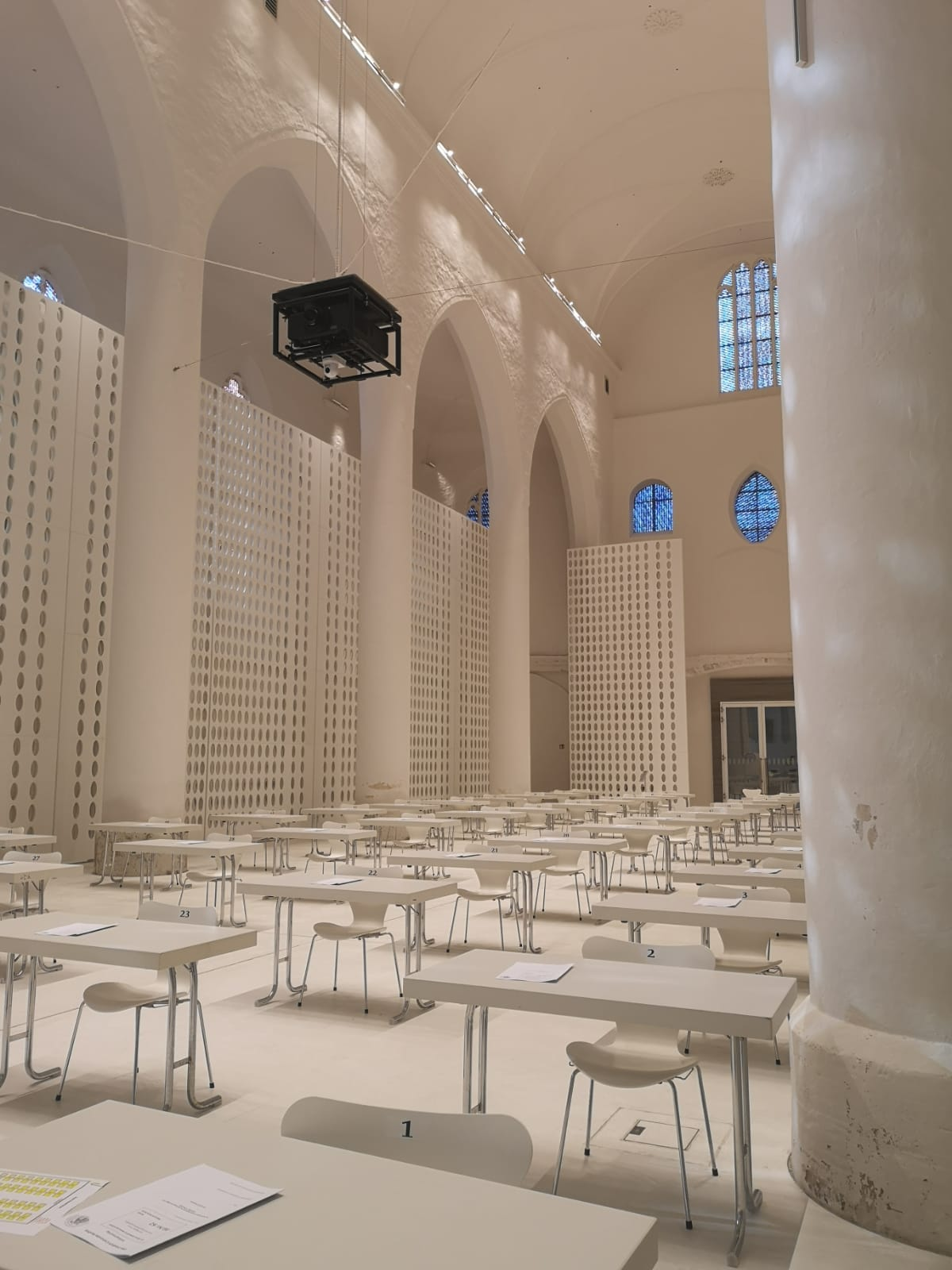
Assembly hall (former church)

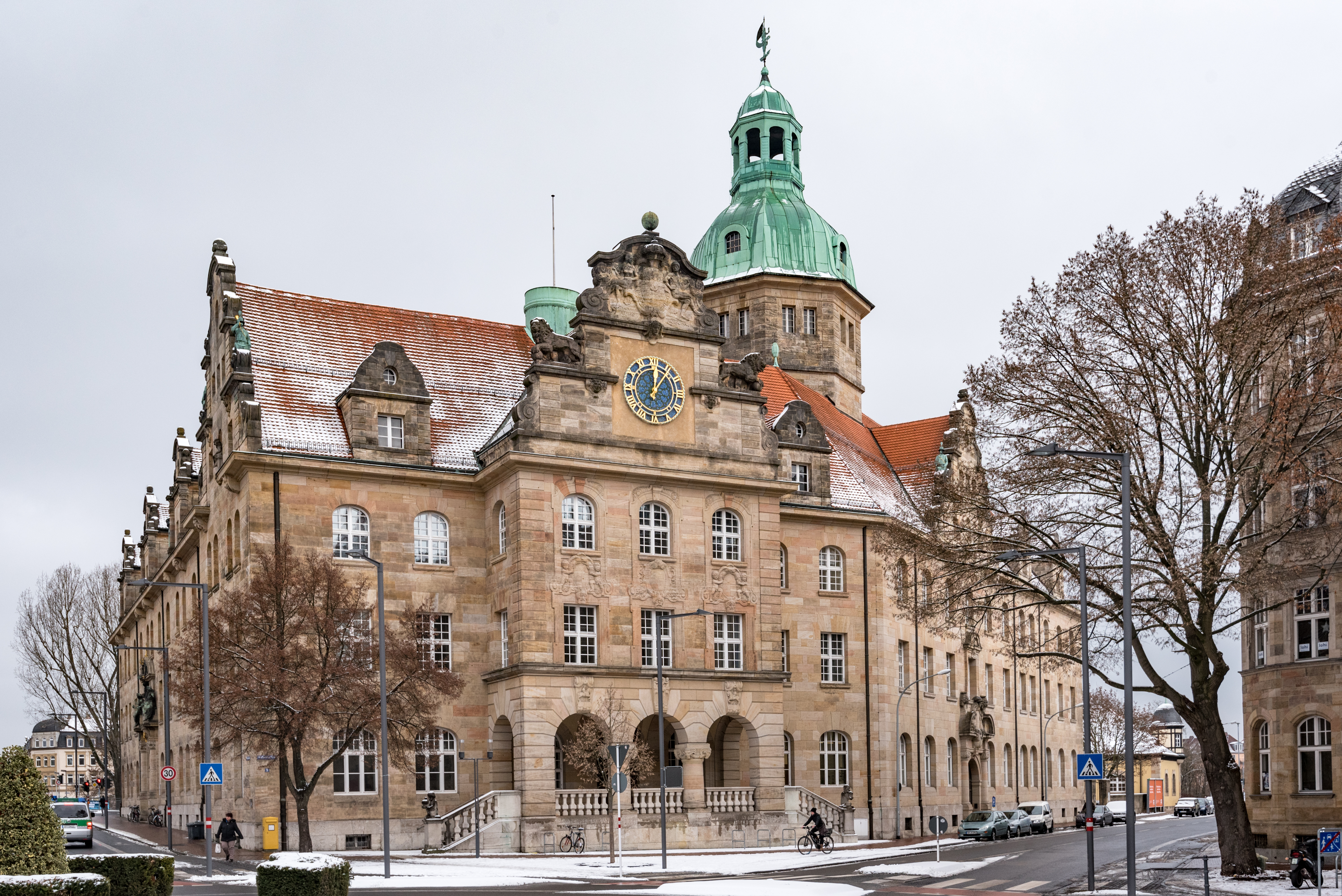
Leibniz Institute for Educational Trajectories (LIfBi)

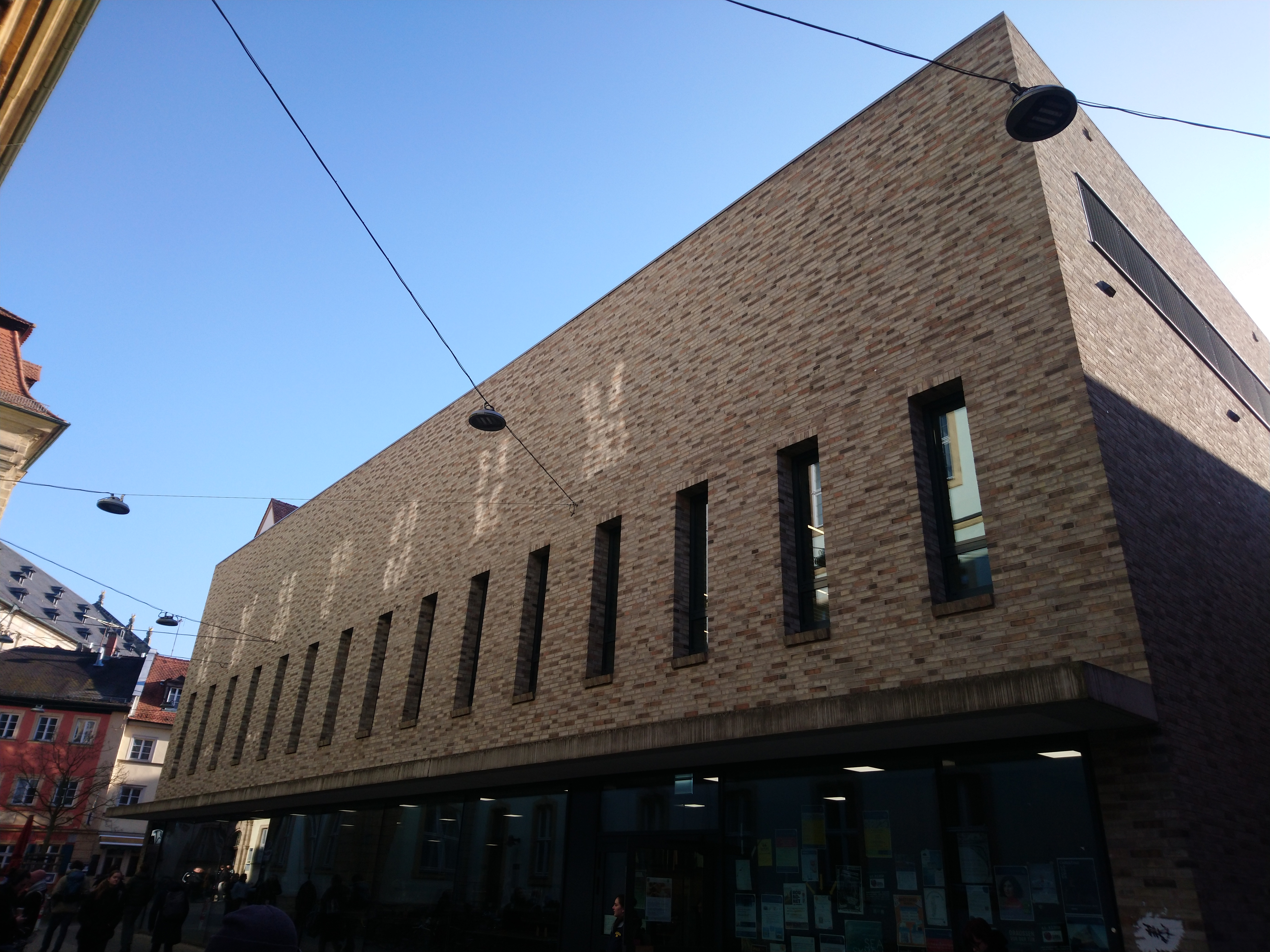
Canteen (Austraße)

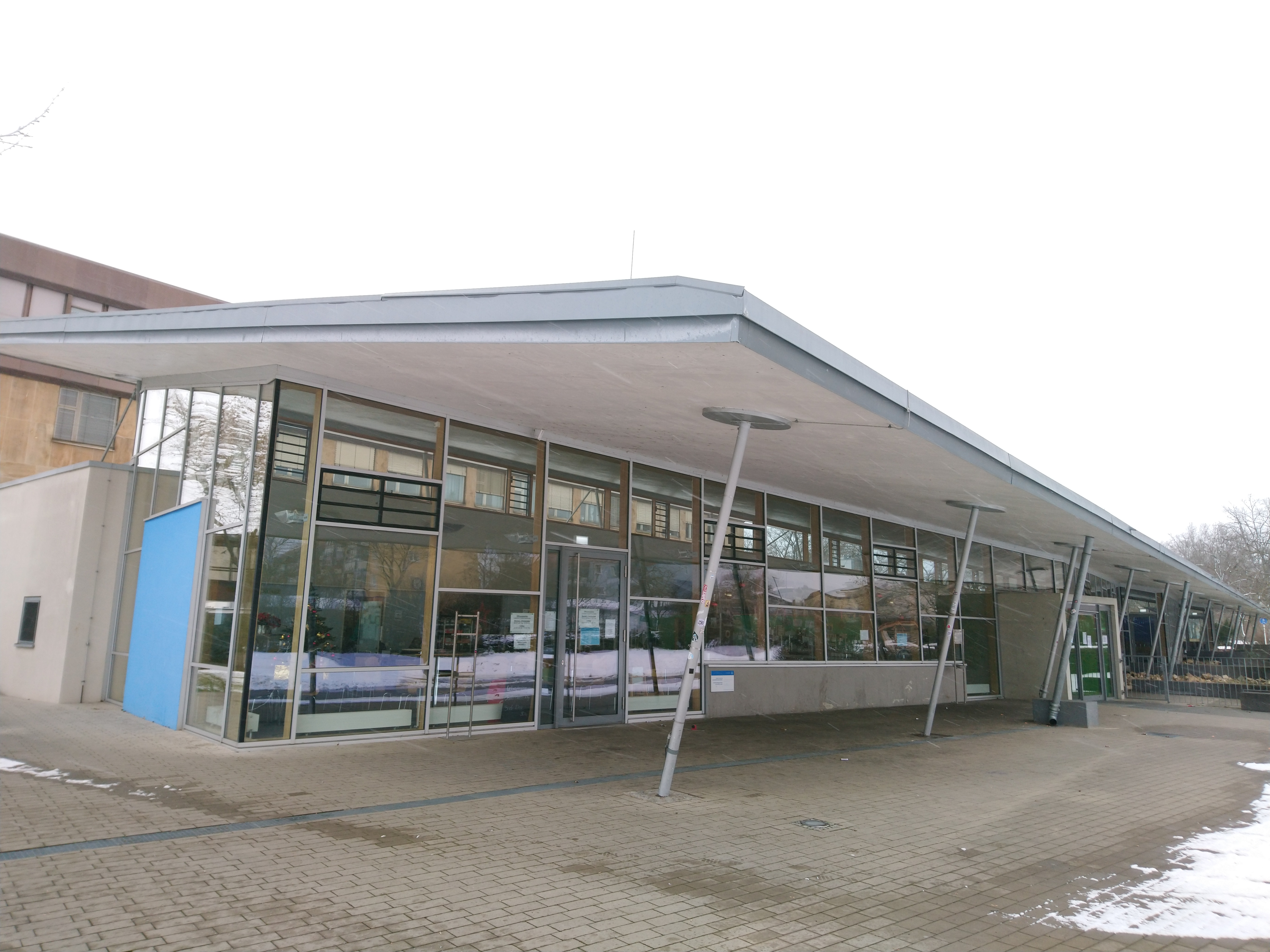
Canteen (Feldkirchenstraße)

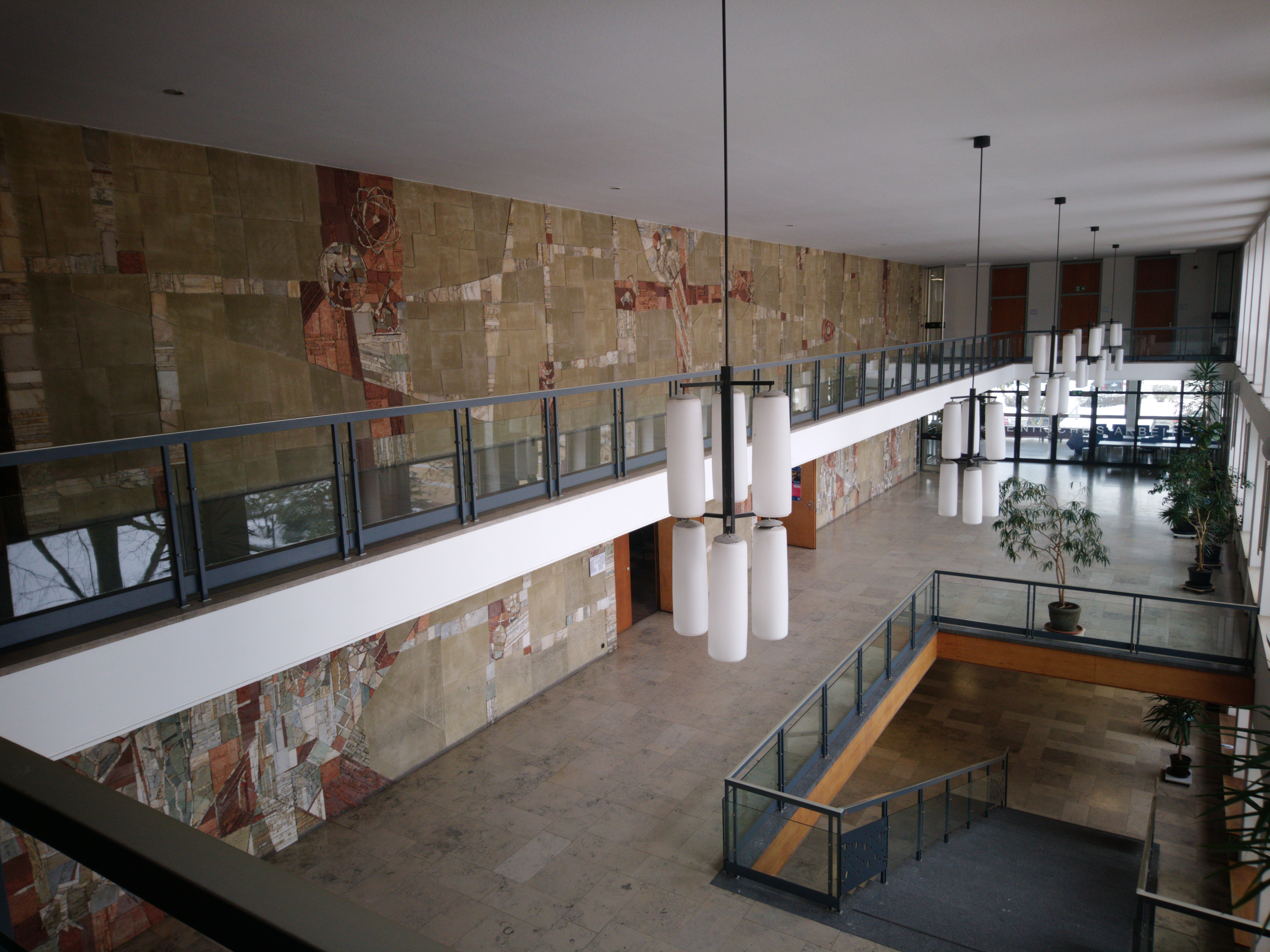
Feldkirchenstraße (inside)

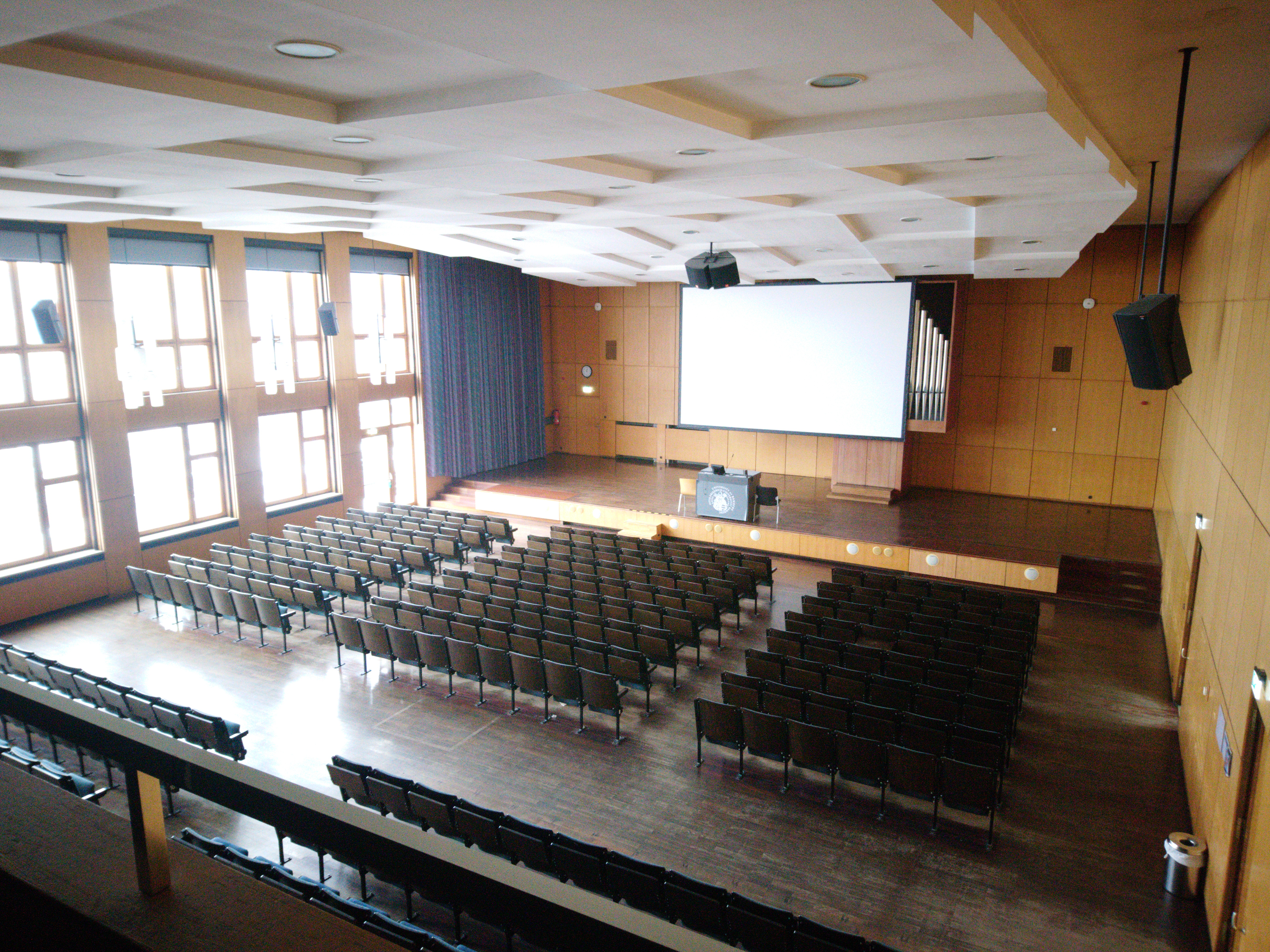
Audimax

== See also ==
- List of early modern universities in Europe
- List of Jesuit sites
- List of universities in Germany
