= Soros: The Life and Times of a Messianic Billionaire =

2002 non-fiction book by Michael T. Kaufman

- First edition cover
- Author: Michael T. Kaufman
- Language: English
- Subject: The life, work, and philanthropy of George Soros
- Genre: Nonfiction
- Publisher: Random House
- Publication date: 2002
- Publication place: United States
- Media type: Print (hardback)
- Pages: 344
- ISBN: 9-780-37570549-6

Soros: The Life and Times of a Messianic Billionaire is a non-fiction book by Michael T. Kaufman released by Random House in 2002, that illuminates the early life, education, work, and controversial philanthropy of George Soros, a man considered by many to be one of the most enigmatic yet globally influential financiers of his era.

== Synopsis ==
A poor immigrant who made an immense fortune and became one of the largest contributing philanthropists of the twentieth century, George Soros has led a unique place in modern history. As the first biography of Soros, and written with greater depth due to his cooperation, Kaufman's work begins with Soros's childhood as a Jew in his birthplace of Budapest, Hungary, during the German and subsequent Soviet occupations in World War II. It follows him through his education at the London School of Economics, to his unprecedented success on Wall Street after his move to America, and details his reasons for establishing his philanthropic Open Society foundations.

The novel provides exclusive insights into the life of a man formerly mysterious and misunderstood, whose struggle to escape the Nazis and survive their occupation strongly contributed to his primary philanthropic goal, namely to use existing organizations and internal grass roots activism to take actions he believed would reduce restrictions on freedom of speech and promote education, economic growth, scientific progress, and civil liberties in nations throughout the world. Toward that end, his Open Society Foundation, which he began in later life and whose name he based on Karl Popper's 1945 opus, The Open Society and its Enemies, has contributed around $32 billion, the vast majority of his wealth, to countries throughout the world to promote civil liberties and economic growth.

As of May 2020, Soros had a net worth of $8.3 billion, having donated more than $32 billion to the Open Society Foundations, of which $15 billion have already been distributed, representing 64% of his original fortune, thus making him the "most generous giver" in terms of percentage of net worth among billionaires according to Forbes. In more recent years he has contributed to approximately 200 political action groups, most of them operating in the United States. His detractors, particularly in the countries where his organizations have been active, often question his motives, achievements, and methods, and often tie their criticisms to their belief that he strongly influences protests and political opponents through political contributions, both public and undeclared.

At the time of the book's publication, Soros was one of the most globally influential men. Kaufman explores Soros' life, motivations and contributions in the countries where his foundations are active.

The book describes Soros's difficult times as an outsider in London after fleeing Budapest. Though he received an exceptional education at the London School of Economics (LSE), as a non-resident he was required to partially finance his education through odd jobs, including working as a railway porter and a night-club waiter. While at the LSE, he received a Bachelors of Arts, and a Masters, and later received a Doctorate from the University of London. At LSE, he was briefly mentored by Karl Popper who made a lifelong impression. The book details Soros's work as a London salesman, and as a stock trader, followed by his move to work for F. M. Myer on Wall Street. Between 1969 and 1997 he operated his own hedge fund, initially named Double Eagle, and later the Soros fund. Eventually named the Quantum Fund, it has had the largest growth, and became the most profitable, of its kind in the late twentieth century. His Theory of Reflexivity, borrowed from Popper, states in simplest terms that a person cannot fully know reality, as his own actions constantly alter it in continuous feedback loops. The same concept is applied to his investment theory, and he advises investors to strongly consider how other investors and outside influences affect the market and cause market trends which must be carefully analyzed, and occasionally tend toward a full boom or a full bust.

=== Nobel prize nominee ===
Kaufman notes in his section "Giving It Away", that despite his numerous detractors, Soros has more than once been recommended for the Nobel Peace Prize. One of the beneficiaries of his foundations, Amnesty International, received the award in 1977. He had been formally nominated for the award in several of the years of the late 1990s, and numerous influential Russian leaders have recommended him for it, most notably Mikhail Gorbachev.

=== Work in Russia ===
Chapter 19 of Soros's book notes that Soros is still strongly criticized by Vladimir Putin in contemporary Russia. In July 2015, Soros stated that Putin's annexation of Crimea was a challenge to the "prevailing world order", specifically the European Union. He hypothesized in 2015 that Putin wanted to "destabilize all of Ukraine by precipitating a financial and political collapse for which he can disclaim responsibility, while avoiding occupation of a part of eastern Ukraine, which would then depend on Russia for economic support." Despite Putin's more contemporary criticism of Soros, as a result of Soros's efforts during Glasnost and Peristroika in the 1980s and 1990s, Mikhail Gorbachev recommended him for the Nobel Peace Prize for giving grants of $100 million to Soviet scientists when the state had no money to pay them, giving $100 million to free the teachings of Humanities in Universities from their adherence to Marxism–Leninism, contributing funds to promote healthcare and fight disease, and, most notably, spending $100 million for all thirty-three regional Universities in Russia to connect to the Internet. Soros also gave additional millions to elementary and secondary schools for textbooks and libraries.

=== Central European University ===
In September 1991, funded entirely by him and staffed with globally recognized academics, Soros founded the Central European University, with its first campus in Prague, Czechoslovakia, and with two other campuses in Budapest, Hungary and Warsaw, Poland. In 2018, the central campus moved from Budapest to Vienna, Austria, forced to leave by ruling Prime Minister Viktor Orbán as a result of a judicial decision that caused public protest in Hungary and that was opposed by a subsequent ruling of the European Court of Justice. By 2019, it had graduated 16,000 students. Soros's annual gift for the operation of the university reached 20 million dollars, and his personal total endowment is approximated at $880 million.

=== Philanthropy and detractors ===
Additional narratives on his personal life and Soros's efforts to further human rights in Hungary, China, and Russia complete the final section of Kaufman's biography. Soros's foundations were highly active in opposing Apartheid in South Africa, and in countering what Soros viewed as the restraints on economic growth or reduction in civil liberties posed by Soviet influence in many Eastern European countries, including first his native Hungary, then Poland, Czechoslovakia, Lithuania, and the Balkans. Prior to 2009, for his work in his native Hungary towards his efforts to modernize the country, Soros was presented with the Medium Cross of Hungary's Republican Order with Stars, the country's second-highest decoration.

By the early 90's Soros's foundations were active in eighteen countries, including Romania, Bulgaria, Yugoslavia, and the new states of Ukraine, Belarus, Moldavia, Georgia, Kazakhstan, Uzbekistan, Kyrgyzstan, and Turkestan. When Yugoslavia broke apart, new foundations came into being in Croatia, Slovenia, Macedonia and Bosnia. In smaller efforts, Soros supported pro-democracy movements in Burma and school construction projects in Albania.

Today Soros's Open Society Foundations supports freedom and democracy initiatives in over 100 countries around the world. The efforts of Soros's foundations have often faced major political opposition and harsh criticism in many of these countries.

==== Controversial views on Israel ====
In respect to his views on Israel, in an article in The New Yorker, Soros stated: "I don't deny the Jews to a right to a national existence – but I don't want anything to do with it." As observed by Kaufman, Soros's views on Israel may reflect his concern for the political and human rights of Palestinians and his frequent support of the rights of refugees, many Palestinians having become refugees on leaving their homes after Israeli independence in 1948. According to hacked emails found in 2016, Soros's Open Society Foundation has had a self-described objective of "challenging Israel's racist and anti-democratic policies" in international forums, in part by questioning Israel's reputation as a democracy, though it is not clear if Soros currently supports such a policy or what direct connection Soros had to any of the hacked emails. Soros has funded non-government organizations which have been actively critical of Israeli policies, including groups that campaign for the Boycott, Divestment and Sanctions movement against Israel. It is not clear if divestment of Israeli products and financial holdings is a policy Soros himself strongly favors, or if the policy should be more strongly attributed to some of the managers in his Open Society Foundations that gave such organizations relatively limited financial support.

An Open Society Policy statement disclosed in 2013 stated "Our theory of change was based on strengthening the advocacy efforts of civil society organizations and platforms in order to maintain sustained and targeted international advocacy that would oblige the international community (mostly Europe and America) to act and to hold Israel accountable to its obligations under the international law." The violations of international law which the Open Society attempted to investigate included actions of the Israel Defense Forces in Gaza. A 2009 paper hacked from the Open Society Foundation noted that the organization should strive to "maintain a low public profile regarding OSI sponsorship of this initiative." The Open Society Foundation was "pushing for Israelis to be 'held accountable' for the 2008–9 Gaza War, when Israel barraged Hamas positions interspersed in the civilian population." Soros was wary of revealing his intention to investigate Israel and its Defense Forces concerning Gaza, as he feared backlash from the pro-Israel lobby. Of particular concern was the Open Society's work with Breaking the Silence, an organization of former Israeli soldiers who tour Europe and the U.S. and discuss what they view as the Israel Defense Force's war crimes. A leaked document attributes the Open Society with a sizable endowment of $100,000 to this group between 2012 and 2014. Revealing the testimony of Israeli soldiers is not inherently anti-Israel, and could as easily be viewed as a bold attempt at advocating human rights.

The article, "George Soros' Israel-Hatred Spills Out Into the Open" claimed to reveal, through hacked emails, that the Open Society Foundation had given funds to a number of organizations that question certain aspects of Israeli policy, and that in fact Soros hates Israel or is anti-Israel. The article was particularly critical of the Open Society Foundation for not publicly announcing their support for these organizations. The anti-Israel organizations cited by the article include Adalah, the Al-Tufula Center, the Arab Association for Human Rights, Baladna, The Galilee Society, Molad, and the New Israel Fund. At least two of these organizations, including Molad and The New Israel Fund, which is backed by the United States, would be difficult to define as anti-Israel, and are primarily think tanks for progressive ideas and the furthering of human rights in the region. The Galilee Society, which is headquartered in Israel and operates there freely, admits to being "critical of the Israeli government", but while being in favor of social and human rights for Arab citizens, and considers itself a balanced organization that sees the need for "maintaining balance and context beyond simplistic point-scoring in the Israeli–Arab conflict". The Arab Association for Human Rights, though a group less well integrated into Israeli society as it is headquartered in Cairo, may be considered to be significantly more critical of Israeli policy, but claims to adhere to international law and to have representative counsel at the United Nations.

The organization Adalah, to which Open Society Foundations gave a relatively small endowment, operates freely in Haifa, Israel, and though it considers Palestine an occupied area, it considers itself non-partisan, submits to international humanitarian law, and, with Israeli backing, has brought over twenty cases before the Israeli Supreme court dealing with equality for Arab citizens, including those that furthered health and education in the unrecognized Arab Bedouin villages in Israel. It would be odd to claim that an organization which has worked successfully with the Israeli Supreme Court is essentially anti-Israel.

The article quoted a total endowment of $9.5 million to these groups over a fourteen-year period between 2001 and 2015. Most of these organizations are recognized as abiding by International Law, and in most cases have offices in Israel. Nonetheless, Soros's past statements on Israel have been far from diplomatic at times, and a cause for concern for many supporters of Israel, particularly a statement he once made blaming a rise in anti-Semitism on the actions of Israel's Defense Forces in Gaza and the West Bank.

=== Black Wednesday ===
As noted by Kaufman, in England, where Soros's hedge funds profited up to a billion dollars from speculating on the value of the pound sterling, Soros was for a period heavily criticized for damaging the British economy as a result of his speculation on the likely devaluation of that currency on September 16, 1992, the date now known as "Black Wednesday". British economists were concerned that the 15–20% devaluation of the pound would reduce the wealth and economic security of their nation's citizens.

==== Converting Pounds to German Marks ====
In simple terms, Soros, on behalf of his hedge fund, and backed by a multitude of co-investors in his firm, acquired and sold around ten billion British pounds, converting the majority into German marks, which would hold steady against the pound. A considerable number of investors around the world privately began selling off the pound as well. A majority of the $10 billion pounds which he primarily sold for marks had been borrowed against the assets he held in his Quantum Fund. When the pound was devalued around 10–15 % against the German mark on September 16, Soros realized a considerable profit of around $1 billion.

Balancing the criticism by many British financial analysts that this move damaged the UK economy, Kaufman noted that Soros had previously invested heavily in British securities during this period, and that during the earlier nationalization of industries imposed by Margaret Thatcher around 1984, Soros's funds were heavily invested in British securities, including in Jaguar automobiles and around $20 million in British Telecom. According to one reliable source, Soros invested $500 million in British stocks shortly before "Black Wednesday", in the first few weeks of September 1992, based on the assumption that a country's equities would rise following the devaluation of its currency. The Queen herself, noted Kaufman, had invested in the Quantum Fund, and negative feelings towards Soros would soon be moderated by a growing population segment that admired Soros's foresight and intellect, and admitted their country's use of a currency backed by the precious metal silver was becoming an outmoded form of exchange. Investopedia, an online economic site, has written, "that economic policies enacted in the U.K. in the aftermath of that day [Black Wednesday] contributed to an improvement in economic growth, lower unemployment, and less inflation."

Shortly prior to the currency speculation of Black Wednesday, the British pound was required to trade at a level of about 2.95 German marks in a "fixed rate" system. Soros believed that "Fixed exchange rate systems were flawed, because they eventually fall apart. In fact, any fixed exchange rate system is flawed, and the longer it exists, the greater the flaws become. The only escape is to have no exchange rate system at all, but a single currency in Europe, as in the U.S." As noted by Kaufman, unlike most other speculators or men of wealth, Soros used his considerable profit to further invest in economic development and education in other countries, and most heavily in Russia, where he felt economic growth and democratic freedoms were most at risk.

As Soros has admitted, at times a small portion of his contributions may have been pocketed by their recipients or used privately by those who should have been administering his foundations, and others have found his positive changes are cut short when a new presidential administration or opposing political movement gains power. In China in 1989, though he made a valiant effort to support economic growth and back anti-Communist dissidents, the Open Society Foundation was forced to close due to the rigidity of China's Communist bureaucracy and opposition from leaders such as Chairman Deng Xiaoping, who associated the group with a competing political faction. In China in 1987, as in several other Communist nations, Soros's Open Society Foundation was erroneously suspected of being tied to efforts of America's Central Intelligence Agency to undermine Communism or export China's technological secrets.

=== Project on Death in America ===
After the death of his father in 1968, Soros felt strongly that the elderly should, if at all possible, be given the opportunity to die at home on their own terms, as the majority wished to die, according to polls. He promoted, but did not seek to legislate, that those dying in great pain from terminal illnesses be given the opportunity to discuss ending their lives with their children and legal counsel. Soros was strongly criticized by many conservatives for allowing a segment of the elderly population to discuss their option to end their lives when there was no way of ending their pain and little chance of obtaining medical assistance that might extend their lives. Many believed this "right" could be exploited by other family members seeking their inheritance, or that death might be administered too early. In 1993, Soros held a meeting of experts to discuss what would become known as the Project on Death in America.

=== Strongest opponents ===
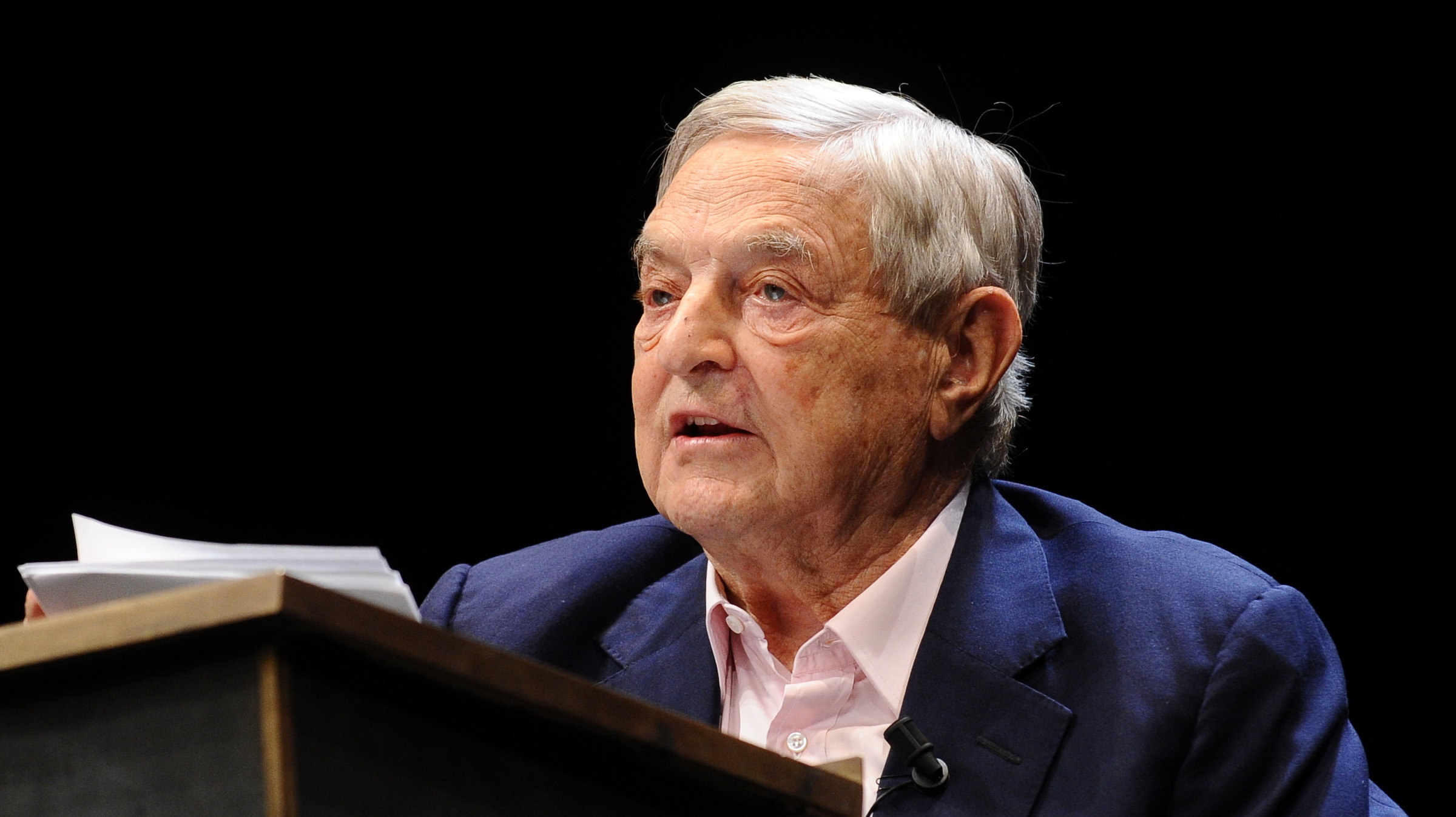
Soros at the 2012 Festival of Economics

The book covers Soros's global opponents and describes some of Soros's American critics, though Kaufman is fundamentally a supporter of Soros in general, perhaps most strongly because of the depth and scale of Soros's philanthropic efforts. Kaufman writes that many of Soros's strongest European and Asian opponents were at one point identified as autocrats, and usually were dictatorial leaders who stifled the opposition press, and feared the influence of outsiders who might open the way to reform. The books say that Soros has "in fact crossed rhetorical swords with a sizable portion of the world's autocrats, dictators, and despots". It argues that Soros's outspoken and often undiplomatic criticism of ruling elites, particularly in Post-Communist countries, may have been his single greatest weakness in obtaining his political objectives.

==== Slobodan Milosevic, Yugoslavia ====
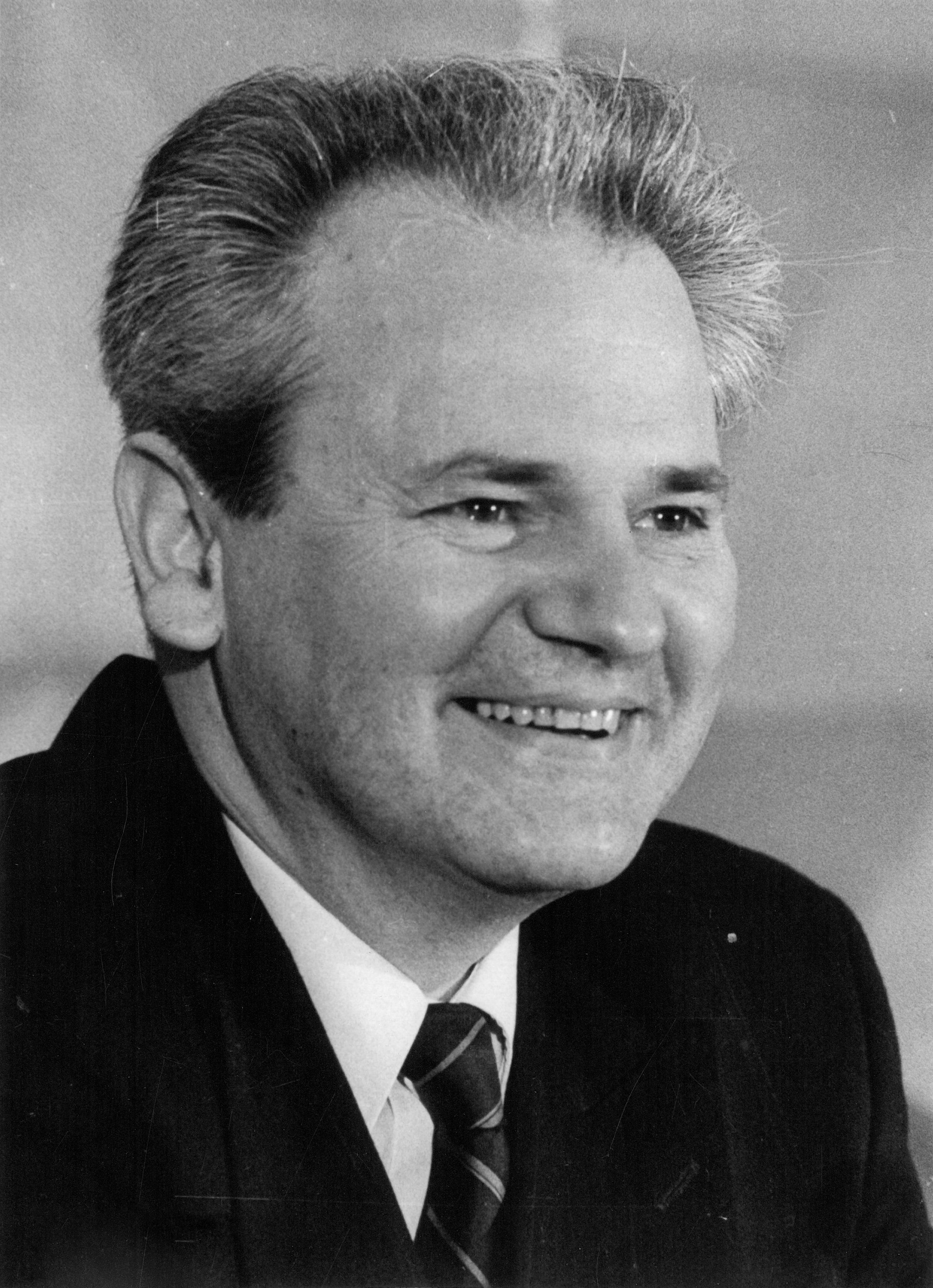
Milosevic

Kaufman observed that Soros has openly feuded with and been denounced by the former Serbian and Yugoslavian President, Slobodan Milosevic who attempted to have Soros's foundation evicted for their support of independent media. Milosevic was charged with war crimes in 1999 by an international tribunal and had stifled the opposition press during periods of his administration.

==== Franjo Tudjman, Croatia ====
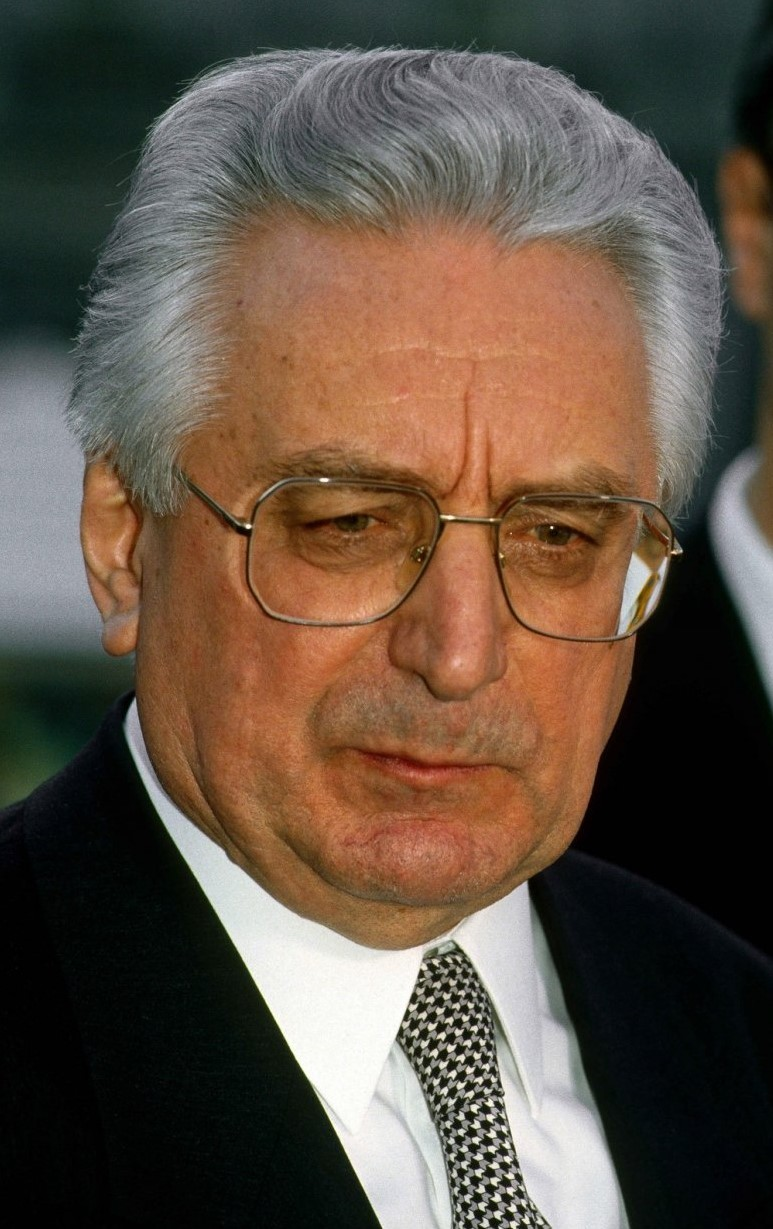
Tudjman

In Croatia, where Soros's foundations also provided economic support, Franjo Tudjman, a nationalistic leader, attempted to punish Soros's Zagreb-based foundation by bringing suits against those providing grants. The Open Foundation's conflict likely occurred during the period of Tudjman's tenure as president when he was criticized as authoritarian by some observers. At least one political observer viewed Tudjman's post-war policies negatively, remarking that "between healthy nationalism and chauvinism, he chose chauvinism; between free-market economy and clientelism, he chose the latter. Instead of the cult of freedom, he chose the cult of the state.

==== Aleksandr Lukashenko, Belarus ====
In Belarus, Communist leader Aleksandr Lukashenko forced the closure of Soros's Minsk foundation by promising to bring criminal investigations into its staff. In 2001, the BBC referred to Belarus under Lukashenko as "Europe's last dictatorship", and criticized Lukashenko for not hosting free elections or maintaining robust freedom of the press.

==== Vladimir Meciar, Slovakia ====
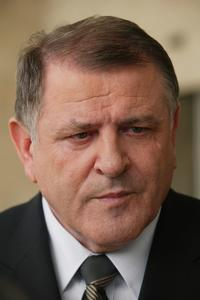
V. Meciar

In Slovakia, Vladimir Meciar, accused of authoritarian styles of leadership in the 1990s, used the press to defame Soros with anti-Semitic slurs similar to those that had formerly been used in Hungary. In April 2000, Meciar was arrested and charged with abuse of power and fraud during his term as Slovokian Prime Minister in the 1990s.

==== Boris Berezovsky, Russia ====
In Russia, Soros may have erred in criticizing wealthy oligarch Boris Berezovsky, whom he truly considered dangerous to Russia as a result of his political stands and possible financial corruption. Always outspoken, his criticism also extended to members of Boris Yeltsin's family. Soros was in turn targeted by media attacks likely initiated by Berezovsky and Yeltsin, though Soros was admired and his causes usually endorsed by Mikail Gorbachev. In total, at least prior to Putin's administration in Russia, Soros's foundations have faced less criticism than in many other nations, and the actions taken by Yeltsin, and his successors have been relatively moderate.

==== United States ====
In the United States, Kaufman noted that Soros has come under attack frequently by leaders of the country's "war on drugs", who abhor his attempts to deal with narcotics as a public health rather than a criminal problem. They attacked him for supporting referendums in five states to legalize the use of marijuana for medicinal purposes. More recent opposition has been by critics who believe his foundations have provided funding to support the campaigns of judges and attorneys general they consider soft on crime.

In August 2009, after the book's publication, Soros donated $35 million to the state of New York to be earmarked for underprivileged children and given to parents who had benefit cards at the rate of $200 per child aged 3 through 17, with no limit as to the number of children that qualified. An additional $140 million was put into the fund by the state of New York from money they had received from the 2009 federal recovery act. Soros's turn to more clearly charitable contributions, though earlier work opening universities, providing scholarships, and fighting disease, could also be seen as primarily charitable, may have been a result of controversies caused by his donations to American political candidates who were Democrats, particularly presidential candidates.

==== Mahathir Mohamad, Malaysia ====
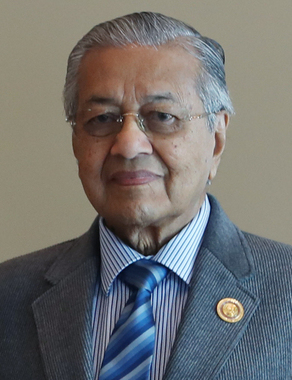
Mahathir, 2019

But Soros may have been most vehemently attacked by long serving Malaysian Prime Minister, Mahathir Mohamad. When the Malaysian currency, the ringgit, dropped in value by 20% in 1997, Mahathir blamed Soros and currency speculators, evoking anti-Semitic themes by mentioning Soros with two Jewish felons accused of financial improprieties Ivan Boesky, and Michael Milken. Kaufman notes, that at the time Mahthir was accusing Soros of driving down the currency, Soros's Quantum fund and other speculators were actually buying Malaysian ringgits in the mistaken belief their value had bottomed out.

=== Nazi collaborator theory debunked ===
Significantly, Kaufman strongly disputes the frequently cited claim that Soros collaborated with the Nazis during his youth in Budapest. His book may be the most frequently quoted source by newspaper and online articles seeking to counter this theory. As Kaufman chronicled, as an adolescent in the early 1940s Soros once briefly worked as a courier for the Jewish Council, or Judenrat, an organization set up by the Nazis that exclusively used young Jewish boys to distribute messages. One day George was required to distribute what appeared to be summonses to the homes of several lawyers that instructed them to report to the "rabbinical seminary on Rok Szilard Street" and to bring food for two days. The ultimate destination of those who received the messages was unknown to the recipients, and certainly unknown to the thirteen year old Soros. George's father Tivadar Soros allowed him to deliver the messages only once, but instructed him to warn the recipients that if they followed the instruction "they may be deported". According to Kaufman's account, which used Soros's parents as his primary source, George's father then convinced his son that he should quit working at the council and advised Soros that some rules should not be followed, even if it risked the horrific retribution of their Nazi occupiers.

=== 60 Minutes interview refuted ===
In another incident in Soros' youth in Hungary that was later used to impugn Soros's character, and was touched on in a December 1998 interview on CBS's "60 Minutes" with Steve Kroft, Kaufman chronicled how George's father Tividar arranged to have George stay with a man named Baumbach while George posed as a Christian named Sandor Kiss to hide his Jewish identify from the Nazis. As an employee of the Ministry of Agriculture, Baumbach was one day tasked with assessing the "artworks, furnishings and other property", of Mor Kornfield, a wealthy aristocrat of Jewish origin and decided to take George with him rather than leave him alone for several days. Kornfield had formerly been able to leave Germany and flee to Lisbon. Kroft, in his "60 minutes" interview, inaccurately stated that Soros's father had "bribed a government official" to swear George was his Godson, and then dramatically and somewhat deceptively added the narrative line that "as hundreds of thousands of Jews were being shipped off to the Nazi death camps, a thirteen year old George Soros accompanied his phony Godfather on his rounds, confiscating property from the Jews". Baumbach, working in an economy with few choices, only inventoried the property, and according to Kaufman through the writings of Tivadar Soros, George's father, fourteen year old George had no awareness that the Nazis might later confiscate it.

George's father Tivadar, upon hearing the story, removed George from Baumbach's care and attempted to hide his son elsewhere. In contrast to the image of Soros's family provided by the 60 Minutes interview, according to Kaufman, George's father Tivadar labored part-time selling false identity and visa papers to Jews that might allow them to flee Germany. The Washington Post also wrote that the Soros family provided identity papers to Jews in Budapest. Tivadar Soros, as did Erzebet, recorded their recollections of George's life well before the 60 minutes interview, and Tivadar died in February 1968, long before the CBS interview. The Washington Post has written that Kroft's interview led to the "ugliest conspiracy theory about Soros", as it was reprised later in harsher form by Glenn Beck for a Fox Cable News station and was later expanded by conspiracy theorist Alex Jones to include the number of Jews supposedly killed by Soros. Emily Tamlin, the author of the Post article, also significantly noted that in the 60 Minutes interview, Soros clearly stated that "he did not participate in the confiscation and was merely brought along."

== Work with Council on Foreign Relations ==
Bill Maynes, a head of the Eurasia fund, nominated Soros for membership to America's Council on Foreign Relations, one of the most respected and guarded organizations of the American foreign policy establishment. Though initially many members had doubts about Soros's knowledge of international relations and questioned his knowledge due to his wealth, Maynes, later noted that "eventually he (Soros) was accepted by the council but it took quite a long time". As noted by Kaufman, former Secretary of State Henry Kissinger has said of Soros, though he considers him overly ambitious in his goals and believes he underestimates the complexity of global problems he strives to address, "I have great respect for George Soros and I think on the whole he has done good things, even in areas where he oversimplifies. His input is important and I respect and admire him".

== Critical reviews ==
Anthony Gottlieb, writing in the New York Times Book Review gave a positive review, noting that while writing about such an unusually strong, unique, and deep personality as Soros, that Kaufman did far more than write a shallow homage to a one dimensional heroic figure. He concludes that "Thanks to this we have an extraordinarily vivid and colorful portrait of one of the most interesting and farsighted figures of our time-a man who through his achievements showed that one can build and use a fortune to help others live better and more wisely."

Andrew Leonard in Salon described Kaufman's insight into Soros's psychological make up the single greatest contribution of the book, and found the novel spell binding, particularly the opening chapters. He writes, "Soros is never fawning, and the psychological portrait it draws is convincing and illuminating. Soros' life, no matter how you slice it, has been extraordinary. The first several chapters read like a thriller. Kaufman excels at dissecting and explaining Soros' psychological makeup."

Finally John Rothchild of the New York Times, considers Kaufman's work, "A flinty-eyed exposition of a brilliant capitalist, devoted provocateur and accidental humanitarian. You come away believing it is possible to be a really rich man and a really good man after all."
