= Mossawa Center =

The Mossawa Center
- Founded: 1997
- Founder: Jafar Farah
- Type: Non-profit; NGO
- Purpose: Human rights, Arab citizens of Israel, social justice, economic justice, anti-racism, Palestinian culture
- Location: Haifa, Israel
- Region served: Israel
- Method: Advocacy
- Website: www.mossawa.org

The Mossawa Center was established in 1997 as a civil society organization to promote equality for Arab citizens in Israel. In Arabic, "mossawa" means "equality". The organization works to promote the social, economic, cultural, and political rights of the Arab minority living in Israel.

== Social and economic justice ==
Arab citizens have been left behind in the development of the Israeli state. Mossawa monitors the State Budget and prepares reports demonstrating the discrimination against Arabs implicit in the distribution of services.

The Mossawa Center lobbies the Knesset to increase budget allocations to the Arab community in Israel. In 2016, Mossawa director Jafar Farah met with members of the Knesset and held a conference with the Knesset Finance Committee to increase budgets for education, welfare, public transportation, and health services in the Arab community.

The Mossawa Center partners with and advocates for the needs of Arab localities in Israel. At the organization's annual Conference on the Legal Status of Arab Citizens of Israel in 2016, the Mossawa Center recognized Al-Araqeeb, an unrecognized Bedouin village in the Negev Desert, with an "Unsung Hero Award" presented by Martin Luther King III. Mossawa also honored Jabir Asaqla, Head of Graduate Programs at the Mandel Center for Leadership in the North, and Nabila Espanioly, founder of Al-Tufula Pedagogical Center.

In September 2015, Mossawa helped to organize a student strike in advance of the start of the school year over government discrimination in terms of providing budgets to meet the needs of Arab citizens of Israel. Jafar Farah reportedly explained, "We want the government to take responsibility for the future of Arab citizens of Israel because we pay taxes like everyone else."

== Legal advocacy ==
Mossawa takes on legal cases supporting the Arab minority as in the case of the unrecognized neighborhood, Wadi Suya'h, in Haifa. Mossawa joined other organizations in those arrested for demonstrating against the Prawer-Begin Plan in representing the Arab town of Sakhneen on July 15, 2013.

== Advocacy in the Knesset ==
The Mossawa Center frequently advocates in the Knesset for greater budget allocations to the Arab community in Israel. Mossawa has been critical of Government Resolution 922, which was intended to close gaps between the Arab and Jewish sectors in Israel. The Mossawa Center argued that Government Resolution 922 was insufficient to close gaps in education, welfare, health, and other issues.

In 2016, the Mossawa Center argued that the so-called "NGO law" was detrimental to Arab organizations' advocacy efforts in Israel and would disproportionately affect organizations sympathetic to Palestinians.

Mossawa denounced legislation in 2010, which would require that immigrants recognize Israel as a Jewish state, noting that this legislation would disproportionately affect Arabs and would threaten Israel's democratic character.

== Youth ==
Mossawa also works closely with youth. The Mossawa Center has hosted camps for international youth come to visit andvolunteer in local communities, and learn about Palestinian culture, customs, and heritage.
