= Association of Chinese language writers in Europe =

Chinese-speaking authors association in Europe

Association of Chinese Language Writers in Europe (CWAE, Chinese: 歐洲華文作家協會; pinyin: Ōuzhōu huáwén Zuòjiā Xiéhuì) was established in 1991 in Paris. It is the first association dedicated to the promotion and creation of contemporary Chinese literary work. Its first president was Ms. Susie Chao, a renowned Chinese writer, and its current president is Joanne Lee, a Chinese writer based in Switzerland. Since its inception, over the years, the association has been recognized as a driving force successfully assembling and supporting the Chinese writers in Europe. It currently has over 80 members, across 22 countries.

== A brief history of the CWAE ==
The CWAE was founded on 16 March 1991 in Paris, after more than a year of intense preparation led by Ms. Susie Chao. For this purpose, she worked almost on a daily basis with a number of Chinese writers who were based in Paris. A European association, uniting those working towards an overseas Chinese literary body with European characteristics, was finally established. This was the first time in the history of overseas Chinese in Europe, that a truly pan-European Chinese writers’ organization was formed. Apart from a few (Ms. Susie Chao, Mr. Chu Wen-Huei, Ms. Daming Lü, Ms. Wang Jiafeng), all other founding members (Ms. Foncy Kuo, Ms. Hsu Sheng-Mei, Ms. S.S. Schwedler, Ms. Yang Ling, Mr. Zu Wei) only finally met face to face either at their hotel on the eve of the opening ceremony or during the ceremony itself. At that time, Mr. Sui Haoping, then only 30-year-old, but already a well-known writer, TV presenter, and a household name in Taiwan, was in the UK for his PhD studies. It took all Ms. Chao's persistence to locate and then persuade him to join the association. To ensure that the venue and organization of the opening ceremony were perfectly ready, Ms. Chao, who was based in Switzerland, undertook a special trip to Paris prior to the event. Many VIPs traveled from all over the world to Paris to attend the opening ceremony (among others Mr. Fu Zhaoxiang, the future President of the World Association of Chinese Writers; Mr. Ya Xuan, Chief Editor of the magazine of the United Daily News from Taiwan; Mr. Mei Xin, Chief Editor of the magazine of the Central Daily News from Taiwan).

The CWAE, besides the Chinese Writers Association of Asia, is one of the earliest branches that led to the formation of the World Association of Chinese Writers (WACW). The Chinese Writers Association of North America was established in 1992, after which other such associations were established in South America, Australia and Africa. They all contributed then, across the seven continents, to form the WACW.

The WACW was established in the winter of 1993 in Taipei, Taiwan, with an opening ceremony held at the Grand Hotel. A delegation of 14 members of the CWAE attended the event. Chinese writers, who until then mostly worked in isolation in different parts of the world, came under one roof, to share the same passion and a longing for their homeland. In the excitement of the exchanges and the warmth of friendship, nobody noticed the particularly cold weather during the event. Today the WACW, with 113 branches and 4,000 members all over the world, has become the largest association of Chinese writers.

== Former presidents of the CWAE ==
- 趙淑俠 Zhao Shuxia (1991–1996)
- 朱文輝(余心樂) Chu Wen-Huei (1996–2002 and 2011–2013)
- 莫索爾 Eduardo Mo (2002–2004)
- 俞力工 Jue Li-Kung (2004–2011)
- 郭鳳西 Foncy Kuo (2013–2017)
- 麥勝梅 Sheng-Mei Mai Hsu (2017–2022)

== Current president ==
- 李筱筠 Joanne Lee (2022–)

== Illustrious members ==
- Xiong Bingming
- François Cheng(程抱一)
- Daming Lü
- Maurus Young
- Zheng Baojuan
- Sui Haoping
- Chiu Yen-Ming
- Bay Sykhun
- Hui-wen von Groeling- Che
- Huang Hesheng
- Elisabeth Bourgevin
- Han Xiu
- Ho Kan
- Zhao Man
- Lin Qimei

== Bi- or trilingual writers ==
- Zhao Shuxia
- You Xie
- Chu Wen-Huei
- Minju Fluri-Yen
- Hui-wen von Groeling- Che
- Jue Li-Kung
- Elsa Karlsmark
- Eduardo Mo
- Maurus Young
- Albert Young (poet)
- Hsu Mai Sheng-Mei
- Ou Manling
- John Xiao Zhang
- Xi Nan.

== Books published by the CWAE ==
- 1. Concerto of chimes from Europe (selected works from Chinese writers from Europe)
- 2. A selection of works from Chinese writers from Europe
- 3. Under the sky in Europe: a selection of works from Chinese writers in Europe
- 4. Through the stained-glass window: short stories from Chinese writers in Europe (tome 1)
- 5. Through the stained-glass window: short stories from Chinese writers in Europe (tome 2)
- 6. Europe without Cliche
- 7. Looking from East to West: family education in Europe
- 8. Tweeting in the woods: 20 years of work from the Chinese writers in Europe
- 9. Green is a way of life in Europe: learning from the Europeans how to save energy, reduce emissions and do away with nuclear.
- 10. Living as guests in Europe: biographies of 30 Chinese writers in Europe.
- 11. Wining and dining in Europe 《餐桌上的歐遊食光》
