= Michael T. Kaufman =

American journalist (1938–2010)

Michael Kaufman
- Kaufman at around 65
- Born: March 23, 1938; Paris, France
- Died: January 15, 2010 (aged 71); New York City, U.S.
- Education: City University of New York, City College (BA)
- Occupations: Journalist; author
- Spouse: Rebecca Kaufman (m. 1960)
- Children: 3

Michael Tyler Kaufman (March 23, 1938 – January 15, 2010) was an American author and journalist known for his work at The New York Times. He won the 1978 George Polk Award in foreign reporting for his coverage of Africa and was a recipient of a Guggenheim Fellowship.

== Early life ==
Kaufman was born in Paris as the only child of Polish Jewish refugees Adam and Pauline Kaufman; Pauline was a teacher and Adam was an economist. His father had been imprisoned in Poland for nine years as a communist revolutionary. In 1940, when the Nazis invaded France, the Kaufman family moved to Spain and in 1941 sailed from Lisbon to New York City. He grew up in Manhattan and earned money at age 13 by selling ice cream. He graduated from the Bronx High School of Science in 1954 and obtained his degree from City College in 1959.

== Career ==
After graduating college, Kaufman taught school in Harlem but quit after a few months to become a copy boy at the Times in 1959. He was married to wife Rebecca in 1960. The couple had two sons—one of whom is the writer Seth Kaufman—and a daughter. During his forty years at The New York Times, Kaufman worked as a foreign correspondent, reporter, and columnist. As a correspondent, he traveled the world and interviewed a number of prestigious individuals.

Kaufman travelled widely as a newspaper correspondent, plying stories from presidents, kings, and not infrequently dictators. He once interviewed the Dalai Lama. He travelled with mercenaries in Rhodesia, and reported on the wars in Angola, Aire, Ethiopia, and Zaire. After his coverage of the Soviet–Afghan War in the 1980s, much of his later career would center on Russia and Eastern Europe, particularly his well reviewed book on George Soros published in 2002, and his books on the dissolution of the Soviet Union, life in Poland, and the Fall of Communism. His nomadic and adventurous life as a foreign correspondent included talking his way through roadblocks, befriending an agent of Israel, surviving an arrest at gunpoint, and documenting the death of Communism in Poland.

From 1975 to 1979, Kaufman covered the African continent, reporting on liberation movements, wars, and riots. He interviewed the dictators Idi Amin of Uganda, Mobuto Sese Seko of Zaire and Mengistu Haile Mariam of Ethiopia, winning a George Polk Award for his work. He reported from Poland from 1984 to 1988, during the waning years of Eastern European Communism. He focused on the conflicts between the government of General Wojciech Jaruzelski and the Solidarity trade union in Poland. It was a moving personal experience, as his father had been a political prisoner there before fleeing the country for France where Kaufman was born. His insightful stories on music, politics and the lives of ordinary Polish citizens came from his existing knowledge of and new insights into Polish history and tradition.

For a short time from 1988 to 1989, and then in bi-weekly columns from 1992 to 1995, Kaufman wrote About New York, creating exceptional stories about ordinary New Yorkers. The widely read New York Times feature would be taken over by Pulitzer prize winner Jim Dwyer in 2017. In 1995, at the invitation of George Soros, Kaufman moved to Prague to edit Soros's publication, Transitions, which covered the social, economic, and political changes taking place in thirty countries moving away from communist rule. Kaufman drew on his experience covering Eastern Europe for the Times in the mid-80's and as Deputy foreign editor from 1989 to 1992, helping the times to organize their reporting on the collapse of Communism. He also wrote for The New York Times Magazine; after retiring in 1999, he wrote obituaries of world and national leaders. His books were well received and largely drew on the knowledge he had gained from his work as a journalist, the deep connection he likely had with his father, a Polish emigre with a considerable knowledge of both economics, and the political history of Eastern Europe.

== Death ==
Kaufman died from pancreatic cancer at St. Luke's-Roosevelt Hospital Center (now Mount Sinai Morningside) on January 15, 2010, at the age of 71.

More than a year after his death, Kaufman was included in the byline for The New York Times obituary of Osama bin Laden on May 2, 2011. Several other obituaries he worked on in advance appeared in the paper in the following years, with one (for Kenneth Kaunda, the former president of Zambia) published more than 11 years after Kaufman died, and another, for American diplomat Henry Kissinger, published almost 14 years after Kaufman died.

== Works ==
External videos
- Booknotes interview with Kaufman on Mad Dreams, Saving Graces, July 30, 1989, C-SPAN

Kaufman wrote seven books and thousands of articles that covered wars, revolutions, politics, and the 1960s in America.

- In Their Own Good Time (Saturday Review Press, 1973) ISBN 0-841-50229-3
- Rooftops & Alleys: Adventures with a City Kid (Alfred A. Knopf, 1973) ISBN 0-394-82486-5
- Mean Streets (Award, 1973), novelization of the screenplay by Martin Scorsese and Mardik Martin
- The Nickel Ride (Award, 1974), novelization of the screenplay by Eric Roth
- The Gun (Award, 1974), novelization of the teleplay by Richard Levinson & William Link
- Mad Dreams, Saving Graces: Poland: A Nation in Conspiracy (1989) ISBN 0-39-455486-8
- George Soros: The Life and Times of a Messianic Billionaire (Alfred A. Knopf, 2002) ISBN 9-780-37570549-6
- The Collapse of Communism (1991) ISBN 0-812-91941-6
- The Decline and Fall of the Soviet Empire (1992) ISBN 0-812-92046-5
