= You Xie =

Chinese-German politician and writer

You Xie 謝盛友
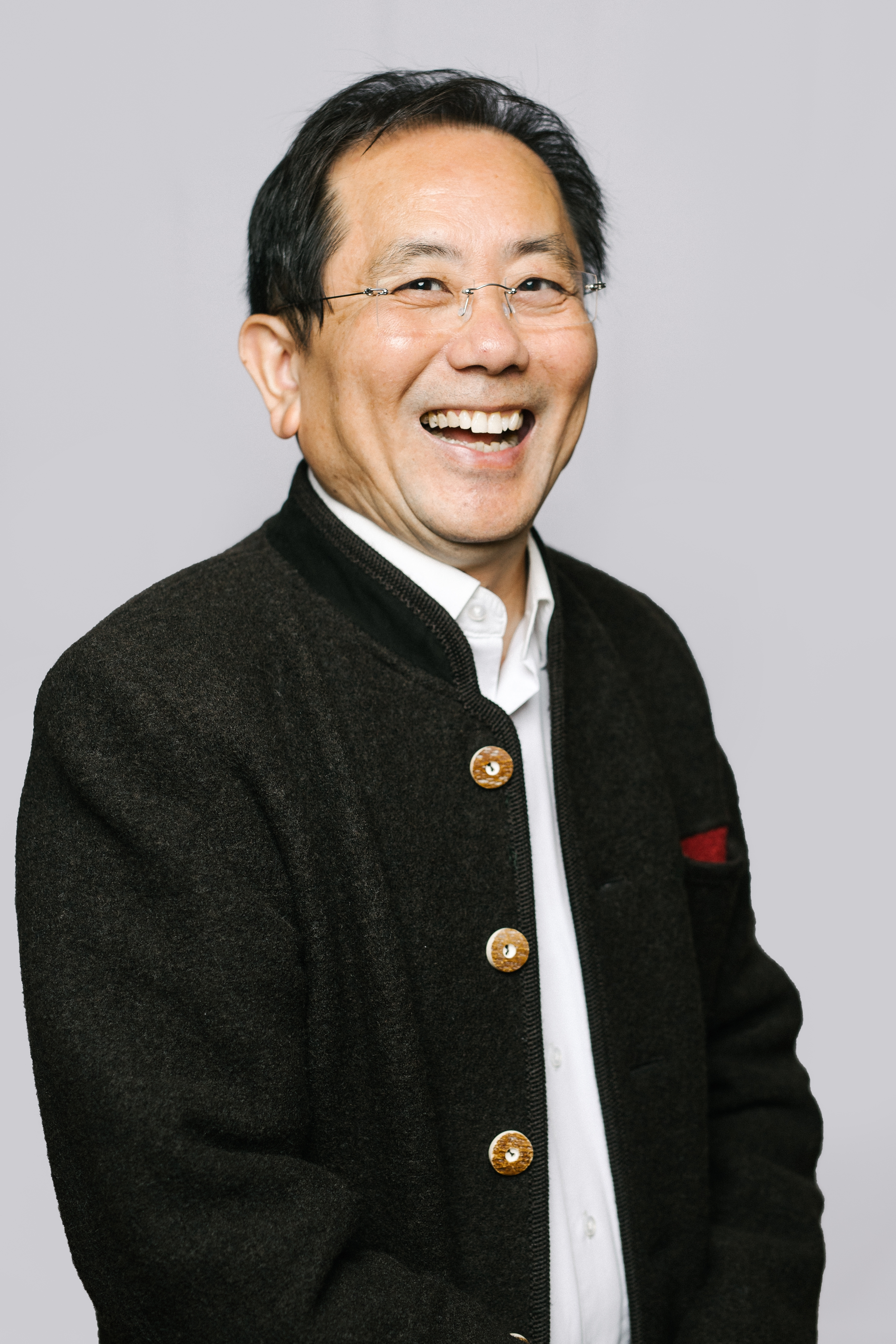
- Born: October 1, 1958 (age 67); Hainan, China
- Education: Sun Yat-sen University; University of Bamberg; University of Erlangen-Nuremberg
- Occupations: Author, Journalist
- Spouse: Shenhua Xie-Zhang (m. 1986)
- Children: Edwar Xie
- Awards: Central Daily News Taipei 1994
- Website: youxie.de

You Xie
- Simplified Chinese: 谢盛友
- Traditional Chinese: 謝盛友
Transcriptions
Standard Mandarin
- Hanyu Pinyin: Xiè Shèngyǒu

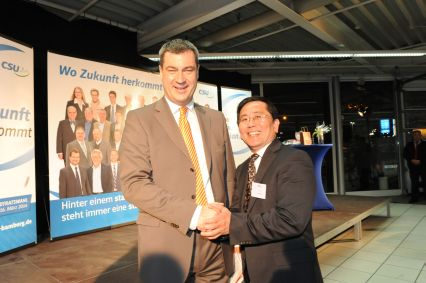
You Xie mit Markus Söder 2014

You Xie (謝盛友; born October 1, 1958, in Hainan, China) is a German politician, candidate in the 2019 European Parliament election, journalist, and author of Chinese origin.

== Life ==
When Xie was born, there was a famine in China. He grew up during the Cultural Revolution and therefore could not attend school, but had to work in the countryside. From 1979 to 1983 he studied German and English at the Sun Yat-sen University in Guangzhou. After graduation (B.A.), he worked as an interpreter for VW in Shanghai.

In 1988, he went to study German language and literature, journalism and European ethnology at the Otto-Friedrich University in Bamberg, Germany. In 1993 he graduated with a thesis on the press policies of the Chinese Communist Party. From 1993 to 1996, he studied law at the Friedrich-Alexander-University in Erlangen-Nuremberg.

By 1989, Xie was chairman of the Association of Chinese Students and Scholars in Germany e.V. In 1999 he founded the Chinese language journal "European Chinese News" that appeared until 2011. Since 2006 Xie has been editor of the Christian magazine "Overseas Campus". In 2010, Xie was selected among the "Top 100 Chinese Public Intellectuals" by the Chinese newspaper Southern Weekly. On 20 April 2013, the members of the Christian Social Union (CSU) in Bamberg selected Xie to the county board. He got 141 of 220 votes, the best result of all county board members. In 2014, Xie was elected to the Bamberg City Council with the most votes of all CSU candidates.

Xie is vice president of the Association of Chinese language writers in Europe and lives with his wife Shenhua Xie Zhang in Bamberg, where he runs the China Fan snack bar. He has been a German citizen since 2010.

Xie's life has been described in several publications: the newspaper Süddeutsche Zeitung (2001), the newspaper Frankfurter Allgemeine Zeitung (2009), the book Bavaria – land in the heart of Europe (2015), the book Bamberg – Portrait of a city (Gmeiner-Verlag, 2017), the newspaper The Huffington Post (2018, in German).

== Works (selection) ==
- Als Chinese in Bamberg, Erich Weiß Verlag, Bamberg, 2013, ISBN 978-3-940821-28-7
- 微言德国, Deutschland betrachten (1. bis 4. Band), China Fan Verlag, Bamberg, 2001, ISBN 3-00-007430-9
- Identität, Integrität, Integration, Serie in European Chinese News, Ausgabe Dezember 2010 ff.
- 主编《那片热土》, 旅德中华学术联谊会出版, Göttingen, 1996
- 主编《東張西望:看歐洲家庭教育》, 新銳文創, Taipeh, 2011, ISBN 9789866094057
- 主编《歐洲綠生活：向歐洲學習過節能、減碳、廢核的日子》, 釀出版, Taipeh, 2013, ISBN 9789865871475

== Awards ==
- Preis der Tageszeitung Central Daily News, Taipeh 1994
- Literaturpreis chinesischer Sprache PIAOMU (Essay), Nanking 2014
- Literaturpreis chinesischer Sprache Lotus (Poesie), Peking 2016
- Preis der Tageszeitung China Times in der Sparte „Gedicht“, Hong Kong 2020
