= Ursula Reutner =

German linguist

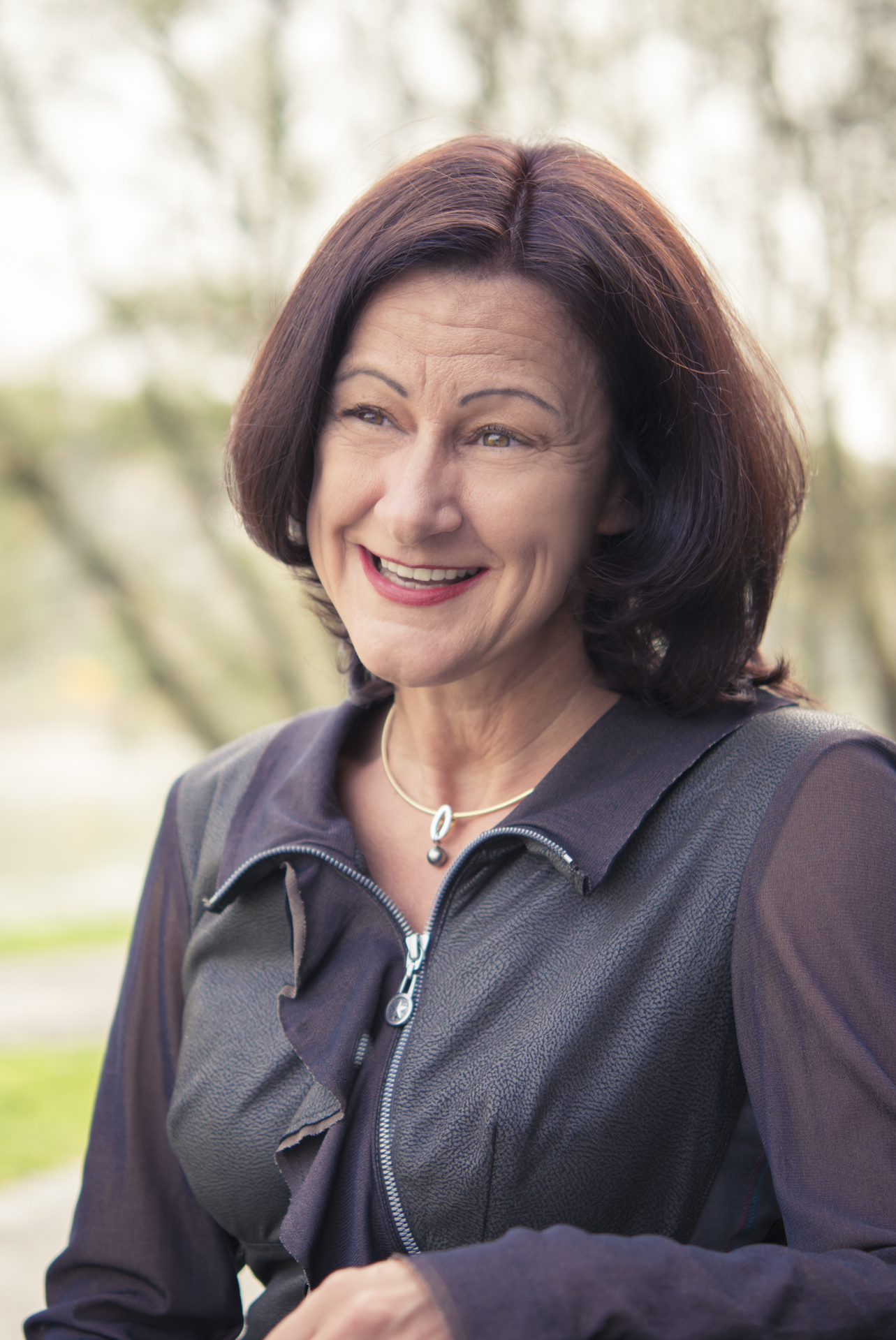
Ursula Reutner, 2018

Ursula Reutner (born 6 October 1975) is a German linguist. She holds the Chair of Romance Languages and Cultures at the University of Passau. Reutner is an internationally renowned expert in Romance Studies and Intercultural Communication, who has won several awards for her work, including the Prix Germaine de Staël, the Elise Richter Prize and an honorary doctorate from the Universidad del Salvador (Buenos Aires). She was born in Bayreuth.

== Career ==
Ursula Reutner studied European Business Studies, Philosophy and Art History as well as English, Italian and Spanish Linguistics and Literature at the University of Bamberg and Paris-Sorbonne University (Paris IV). Having obtained her doctorate in Romance Linguistics/French with research on Language and Identity at the University of Augsburg in 2004, she embarked on postdoctoral research on Language and Taboo for her postgraduate habilitation degree, which she completed in 2007, thus gaining the formal right to teach and conduct research at professorial level (venia legendi). She was a visiting professor at universities in France, Italy, Spain, Canada, Mexico, Argentina and Brazil and, in academic year 2007–2008, interim chairholder of the Chair of Romance Linguistics at the University of Duisburg-Essen. In 2009, she joined the University of Passau, where she was appointed Chair of Romance Languages and Cultures. During her time in Passau, she was offered professorial appointments at the University of Heidelberg (in 2011) and the University of Paderborn (in 2014), which she both declined. Ursula Reutner is a member of numerous Romance Studies associations and sits on the Academic Advisory Board of the journal Romanistik in Geschichte und Gegenwart. She is the Director of the Language Center at the University of Passau and the Director of the Institute of Intercultural Communication, that organizes and conducts intercultural training programs for students, business people and politicians. From 2014 until 2018, she was the Vice President for International Relations of her University; as such she has increased and modernized the international orientation of this Institution, received internationally renowned guests from all over the world and concluded numerous new contracts with outstanding partner universities worldwide.

== Research ==
Ursula Reutner is a specialist in studies on multicultural societies that she analyses with regard to their socio-linguistic situation, their linguistic and cultural history as well as the Language Planning and Policies they are affected by. Her examination of different French-speaking countries using a homogeneous set of criteria allows her to establish a typology of French-speaking countries. She is also highly recognized for her research in the field of language and power, including political correctness and linguistic taboos, and her works in the framework of Intercultural Communication, cultural contact and the cultural analysis of the Internet. Other research interests are Diglossia and Social Multilingualism, Scientific Language, Linguistic Norms and Judgements, Speaker Attitudes, Lexicology and Lexicography and Philosophy of Language.

== Honors and awards ==
- Admission to the Order of St. George (2026)
- Bavarian Order of Merit (2023)
- Paul Harris Fellow of Rotary International (2021)
- Honorary doctorate from the Universidad del Salvador in Buenos Aires (2018)
- Prix Germaine de Staël of the German Association for French Studies (2006)
- Elise-Richter-Preis of the German Association for Romance Studies (2005)

== Selected publications ==
- Romania Africana. Romance languages in African multilingual environments. De Gruyter, Berlin/Boston 2026, ISBN 978-3-11-147155-6.
- Manual of Romance languages in Africa. De Gruyter, Berlin/Boston 2024, ISBN 978-3-11-062610-0.
- Manuel des francophonies. De Gruyter, Berlin/Boston 2017, ISBN 978-3-11-034670-1.
- Interkulturelle Kompetenz. Anleitung zum Fremdgehen – Ein Lernparcours. Westermann, Braunschweig 2015, ISBN 978-3-14-162172-3.
- Lingüística mediática y traducción audiovisual. Lang, Frankfurt am Main 2015, ISBN 978-3-631-66486-5.
- Von der Zeitung zur Twitterdämmerung. LIT, Münster 2014, ISBN 978-3-643-12451-7.
- Bienvenue chez les Ch'tis. Reclam, Stuttgart 2013, ISBN 978-3-15-019821-6.
- Political Correctness. Lang, Frankfurt 2012, ISBN 978-3-631-62242-1.
- Von der digitalen zur interkulturellen Revolution. Nomos, Baden-Baden 2012, ISBN 978-3-8329-7880-8.
- Geschichte der italienischen Sprache. Narr, Tübingen 2011, ISBN 978-3-8233-6653-9.
- Sprache und Tabu, Interpretationen zu französischen und italienischen Euphemismen. Beihefte zur Zeitschrift für Romanische Philologie. Band 346. Niemeyer, Tübingen 2009, ISBN 978-3-484-52346-3.
- 400 Jahre Quebec. Kulturkontakte zwischen Konfrontation und Kooperation. Winter, Heidelberg 2009, ISBN 978-3-8253-5708-5.
- Beiträge zur Kreolistik. Buske, Hamburg 2007, ISBN 978-3-87548-478-6.
- Sprache und Identität einer postkolonialen Gesellschaft im Zeitalter der Globalisierung. Eine Studie zu den französischen Antillen Guadeloupe und Martinique. Buske, Hamburg 2005, ISBN 3-87548-423-1.

== See also ==
- Diglossia
- French language
- Language policy in France

== Sources ==
- "Porträt Ursula Reutner". In: Romanistik in Geschichte und Gegenwart 17/1 (2011), p. 159–163.
