= Riccardo Basile =

German presenter

Riccardo Basile (born November 6, 1991, in Fulda) has been a German television presenter for Sky Deutschland since August 2017.

== Life and career ==
Riccardo Basile grew up in Fulda. After graduating from high school in 2011, Basile studied communication science, political science, and Romance studies at Otto Friedrich University in Bamberg. Before and during his studies, he worked as an intern and freelancer for the sports editorial department of Sky Deutschland. After completing his studies with a Bachelor of Arts degree, he continued to work as a freelancer for Sky. Since August 2017, Basile has been moderating the Bundesliga and UEFA Champions League alongside Esther Sedlaczek and Britta Hofmann as well as Sebastian Hellmann and Michael Leopold. Basile has also been Jörg Wontorra's co-host on Wontorra der Fußball Talk on Sky Sport News since August 2018. Since January 2018, he has also been responsible as a filmmaker for the “Goodlife” section on Sky.

In 2022, Basile was a contestant on the RTL show Let's Dance. There he took 11th place together with his professional dance partner Isabel Edvardsson.

In 2016, Basile founded the fashion label “BOLZR”, which he still runs today. He also works as an influencer and is best known as the advertising face of L'Oréal, Metaxa, and Home Deluxe.

Basile lives in Munich.
