= Kai Fischbach =

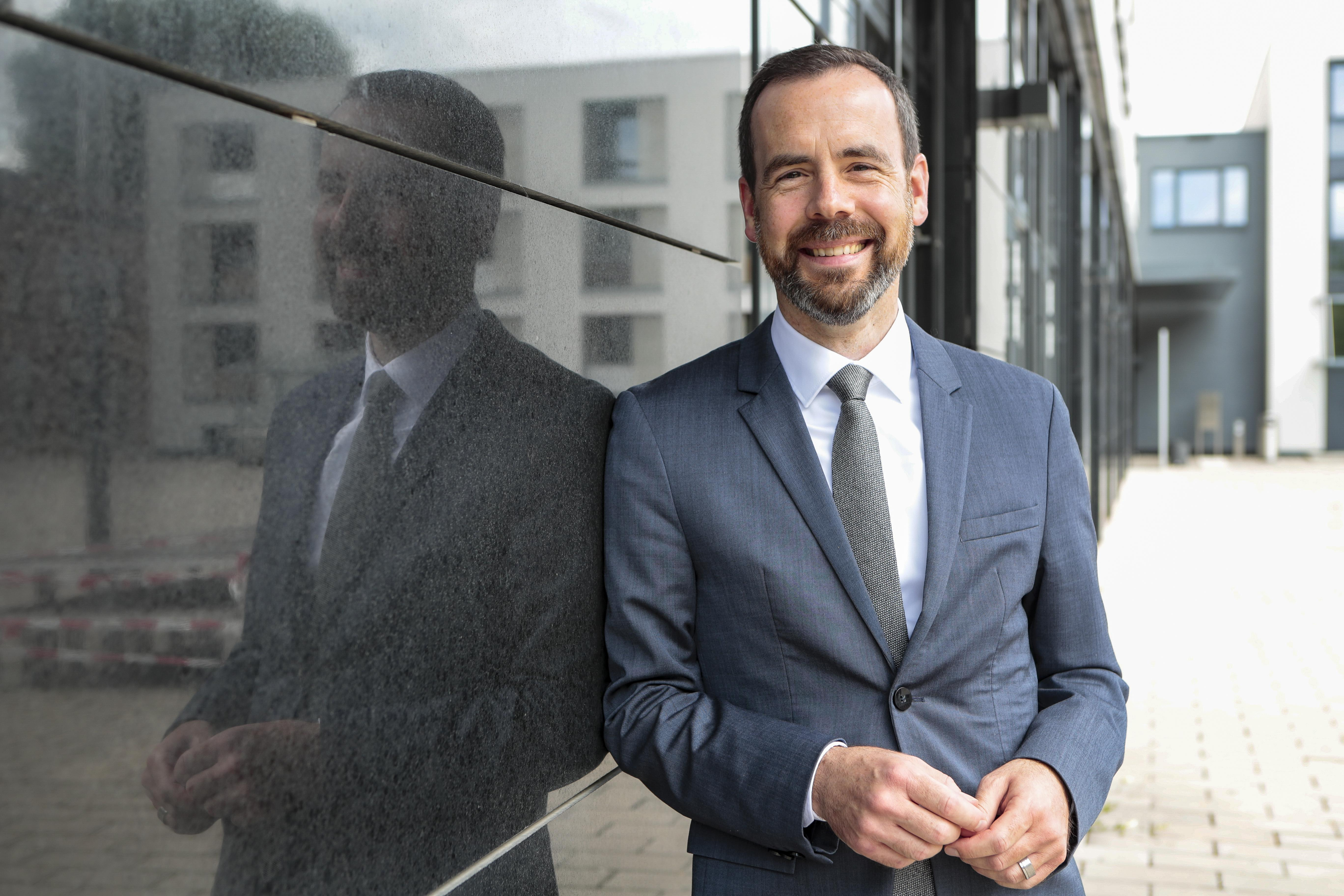

President of the University of Bamberg
- Incumbent
- Assumed office 1 October 2020
- Preceded by: Godehard Ruppert

Personal details
- Born: 1972 (age 53–54) Siegen, Germany
- Education: University of Siegen
- Known for: Social network analysis
- Scientific career
- Thesis: Strukturbildung in Peer-to-Peer-Netzwerken (2006)

Kai Fischbach (born 1972 in Siegen) is a professor of business information systems and president of the University of Bamberg.

== Life ==
Fischbach studied mathematics and social sciences from 1993 to 2000 at the University of Siegen. Between 2000 and 2012, he worked as a research assistant at the University of Siegen, the WHU – Otto Beisheim School of Management, and the University of Cologne, as well as a visiting scholar at the Center for Collective Intelligence of the MIT Sloan School of Management, the Department of Business Administration of the University of Illinois at Urbana-Champaign, and the Robinson College of Business of the Georgia State University. In 2006, he received his doctorate from WHU.

In 2012, Fischbach was appointed to the Chair of Business Information Systems, particularly Social Networks, at University of Bamberg. From 2015 to 2017, he served as dean of the computer science department. From 2017 to 2020, he was chair of the academic senate of the University of Bamberg. Since October 1, 2020, Fischbach has been president of the University of Bamberg.
