= Nabila Espanioly =

Palestinian-Israeli activist (born 1954 or 1955)

- نبيلة إسبنيولي
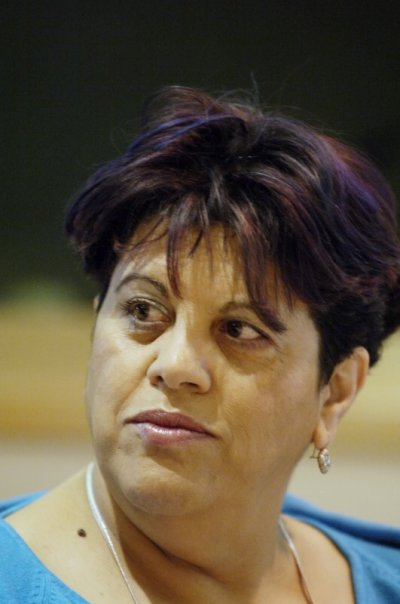
- Born: 1954 or 1955 (age 70–71)
- Occupations: Clinical psychologist, Social worker
- Organization: Al-Tufula Center

Nabila Espanioly (Arabic: نبيلة إسبنيولي, Hebrew: נבילה אספניולי) is a Palestinian-Israeli psychologist, social worker, feminist, and peace activist. She is the founder and director of the Al-Tufula Center in Nazareth.

== Early life and education ==
Espanioly grew up in a communist family in Nazareth. She attended a local school. She joined the Nazareth branch of the Movement of Democratic Women in Israel. Her family is Palestinian Christian and has lived in Nazareth since the 16th century; a neighborhood in Nazareth is named for them. Espanioly became active in politics and joined Hadash around the time she applied to the University of Haifa to study social work.

Espanioly says she was initially rejected from the university. Asking why, she says one office said her marks were not high enough and another said she wasn't fluent enough in Hebrew or English. She argued with them and was eventually accepted. Espanioly received a B.A. in Social Work from the University of Haifa, and an M.A. in Psychology from the University of Bamberg.

== Political activism ==
In 1975, Espanioly attended the first Nazareth General Assembly as a student representative. After Israel appropriated land around Sakhnin, Espanioly felt it was an existential threat for Palestinians in Israel and joined a strike proposed by Tawfiq Ziad. It was the first Palestinian general strike since 1936. In the morning a group stood on street corners and asked people not to go to work, handing flowers to those who agreed. 95 percent of businesses in Nazareth closed for the day. Israel declared a curfew, sparking protests in which six Palestinians were killed. Espanioly later described this as "a defining moment" in her life, when Palestinians began "behaving as a national minority" rather than multiple disparate groups.

Espanioly became active in the Israeli women’s movement during the First Intifada. As a member of the Haifa Feminist Center and a well-known Palestinian-Israeli feminist, she appeared regularly on Israeli national news programs. She advocated for the formation of groups for Palestinian women within larger Israeli women's organizations, notably supporting the concept at Israeli feminist conferences in 1994 and 1995, while also emphasizing her view that women are "united by [their] oppression."

After the 2008-2009 Gaza War, Espanioly participated in protests led by the Israeli Communist Party and by pacifists, and worked with local women's cells of the Party to organize humanitarian aid for the Palestinians in the Gaza Strip.

Espanioly ran an unsuccessful campaign for the Knesset as a member of Hadash in 2013. She was also involved in the founding of the Mossawa Center, which later presented her an award for her activism.

=== Al-Tufula Center ===
Espanioly is the founder and director of the Al-Tufula Center in Nazareth, which works to support early childhood education for Palestinian families. She founded the Center in the late 1980s.

== Bibliography ==
- Marteu, Elisabeth (2010). "Compléments ou alternatives? Associations de femmes et partis politiques arabes palestiniens en Israël" [Complements or alternatives? Palestinian Arab Women's Associations and Political Parties in Israel]. Le Mouvement Social (in French). 231 (1): 45–62. doi:10.1353/lms.0.0127. ISSN 1961-8646. S2CID 144497905 – via Project MUSE.
- Neslen, Arthur (2011). In Your Eyes a Sandstorm: Ways of Being Palestinian. University of California Press. doi:10.1525/j.ctt1pp568.41. ISBN 978-0-520-26427-4. JSTOR 10.1525/j.ctt1pp568.
- White, Adam (2013). The Everyday Life of the State: A State-in-Society Approach. Seattle: University of Washington Press. ISBN 978-0-295-80463-7 – via Project MUSE.
