= Albert Young (poet) =

Albert Young (楊岡 Yang Gang, pen name 青峰Qing Feng; born July 30, 1962, in Taiwan) is an international writer, poet, Manager and Professor who resides in Switzerland.

== Life ==
Albert Young is an international writer and poet who writes and publishes in English, French and Chinese and uses the pen name of Qing Feng for his Chinese publications. He was born on July 30, 1962, in Taiwan and graduated from the Ecole Centrale de Lyon (France) and the Cornell University (USA). He had an international career with a multinational oil company, in France, the Caribbean and Asia, before moving to Switzerland in 2008 as a senior executive for a multinational industrial group. Albert Young is the elder son of Dr. Maurus Young (in Chinese 杨允达, Yang Yunda) who is the President of the World Congress of Poets. Albert Young currently serves as the vice-president of the Association of Chinese language writers in Europe.

== Writings ==
Albert Young has been passionate about writing since his early childhood. In his student days in Taiwan and then in France, his works were regularly highly acclaimed. His poem "La Liberté" written in junior high school, won the Best Poem Award for Young Poets from the city of Paris. In high school, he was selected by the prestigious Lycée Louis-le-Grand in France to represent the school in a national writing competition. He writes in English, French, German and Chinese to express the deepest emotions in a simple but touching way.

== Awards ==
Albert Young was the recipient of the 61st Literary and Art Medal from the Taiwan Literature and Arts Association for his work on poetry creation and translation, his poem "Mount Guanyin" won the "2020 New Taipei City Literary Award" (New Residents Creation Award), his micro-fiction "Fatal Keystroke" won an "Excellence Prize" in the 7th "Micro Fiction Award" from the Taicang City, Jiangsu Province, China [5] His micro fiction "A Zhong" was awarded 3rd prize in the 2017–2018 World Contest of Micro Novels in Chinese.

== Appraisals ==
In an introduction, Dr. Maurus Young wrote: "Poets who can write in multiple languages are indeed very rare. What poets, painters and composers pursue, with their work, is what is true, nice and beautiful in life. Albert writes about the simple stories that had a profound impact on his life, and some of those particularly moving moments that, even years after, would still make his heart beat. Albert, in his work, uses a style that is simple, direct and pure and has chosen a noble way for his creation."

== Works ==
Trilingual (Chinese, English, French) poetry collections:

- 《瞬間》臺灣臺北文史哲出版社 2016年4月 ISBN 9789863143727

"Moments", published in Taipei, Taiwan, The Liberal Arts Press, April 2016

- 《感動》臺灣臺北文史哲出版社 2017年5月 ISBN 9789863143666

"Emotions", published in Taipei, Taiwan, The Liberal Arts Press, May 2017 （中、英、法 3 語原創個人詩集）

- 《觀Comtemplation》 臺灣臺北文史哲出版社 2018年10月 ISBN 9789863144397

"Contemplation", published in Taipei, Taiwan, The Liberal Arts Press, October 2018

- 《夢幻》 臺灣臺北文史哲出版社 2022年7月 ISBN 9789863146124

"Illusions", published in Taipei, Taiwan, The Liberal Arts Press, July 2022
