= Gerhard Vinken =

Gerhard Vinken (born 15 April 1961 in Hanover) is a German art historian and heritage conservationist.

== Career ==
Gerhard Vinken studied Art History, Philosophy, and History in Freiburg, Paris and Berlin and was awarded his doctorate in 1995 by Heinrich Thelen at the Free University of Berlin with a thesis on Romanesque sacral architecture in the Auvergne (Baustruktur und Heiligenkult. Romanische Sakralarchitektur in der Auvergne). He took his post-doctoral Habilitation degree in art history at the Faculty of Philosophy and History at the University of Bern (Switzerland) in 2008 with a work on the "making" of the old town (Zone Heimat. Altstadt im modernen Städtebau, Munich/Berlin 2010).

Beyond academia, he served as division head (Gebietsreferent) of the Brandenburg State Architectural Conservation Authority (BLDAM) from 1992 to 1994, participated in various art history and heritage conservation research projects and worked as an author and journalist. He was the principal author of the seminal research encyclopedia of historical monuments throughout the state of Brandenburg and taught at institutions including BTU Cottbus, the University of Greifswald, the Free University of Berlin, the Humboldt University of Berlin and in Tashkent, Uzbekistan.

From 2003 to 2006 he was Acting Professor of Art History and Architectural Theory at RWTH Aachen University, then from 2009 to 2012 Professor of Interdisciplinary Urban Studies in the Department of Architecture at the Technical University of Darmstadt. This endowed professorship was assigned to the research group working on "The Intrinsic Logic of Cities" (Eigenlogik der Städte), a project funded by the Hessian Ministry of Higher Education, Research and the Arts as part of the Hessian State Offensive for the Development of Scientific and Economic Excellence (LOEWE) and was responsible for most teaching activities of the Graduate School for Urban Studies (URBANgrad).

Since 2012, Professor Vinken has held the Chair in Heritage Conservation at the University of Bamberg. He is a founding member of the Centre for Heritage Studies and Technologies (KDWT), which was established in 2016, and continues to sit on its executive.

Twice, in 2004 and 2006, he was a Fellow at the International Research Center for Cultural Studies in Vienna ("Changing Metropolises"). In 2014/15, he was a visiting scholar at New York University (NYU) and in 2023, he was a Fellow at the Institute for Urban Humanities (IUH) at the University of Seoul (Republic of Korea). He was awarded a prestigious Volkswagen Foundation Opus Magnum grant for his foundational study "Kulturerbe als Aufgabe" (2025).

== Research ==
After writing his doctoral dissertation on Medieval architecture, Vinken shifted his focus to historical urban research. He was motivated to do this by an interest in practical heritage conservation and a research project funded by the Gerda Henkel Foundation (Historic Cities in Modern Urban Planning, 2003–7). Influenced by the "spatial turn", he applied spatial theory to this field, an approach that he developed as a research fellow at the International Research Center for Cultural Studies (IFK) in Vienna and within the DFG research network: "Spaces in the City: Perspectives on Spatial Research in Art History" (2004–2007) – including its application to heritage conservation research. During his tenure as Professor of Interdisciplinary Urban Studies at the Technical University of Darmstadt and while pursuing the LOEWE project on "The Internal Logic of Cities", he worked on the logics of reproduction of cultural and urban heritage.

His general field of research is the construction of traditions and historical structures in architecture and urban planning. Alongside major works on the genesis of the historic city, Vinken has published on topics including post-war reconstruction, reconstructive architectures and urban conservation, contributing to questions around image production, homogenization, and myths of cleansing and purification.

In recent years, Vinken's interests have centered on the anthropological turn in heritage studies and on critical heritage studies. Topics such as heritage and emotion, participation, cultural self-determination and processes of suppression and marginalization were taken up in historical and theoretical reflections on the political agenda of cultural heritage.

== Selected publications ==
=== Books ===
- Baustruktur und Heiligenkult. Romanische Sakralarchitektur in der Auvergne, Wernersche Verlagsgesellschaft, Worms 1997 (Dissertation), ISBN 978-3-88462-134-9.
- Zone Heimat. Altstadt im modernen Städtebau, Deutscher Kunstverlag, München/Berlin 2010 (Habilitation), ISBN 978-3-422-06937-4.
- Zones of Traditions, Places of Identity. Cities and their Heritage, transcript, Bielefeld 2021, ISBN 978-3-8376-5446-2. doi:10.14361/9783839454466

=== Edited volumes ===
- Denkmal – Werte – Bewertung. Denkmalpflege im Spannungsfeld von Fachinstitution und bürgerschaftlichem Engagement (with Birgit Franz), Mitzkat, Holzminden 2014, ISBN 978-3-940751-95-9.
- Das Erbe der Anderen. Denkmalpflegerisches Handeln im Zeichen der Globalisierung / The Heritage of the Other. Conservation Considerations in an Age of Globalization, Universitätsverlag, Bamberg 2015, ISBN 978-3-86309-314-3, 978-3-86309-315-0.
- Produkt Altstadt. Historische Stadtzentren in Städtebau und Denkmalpflege (with Carmen M. Enss), transcript, Bielefeld 2016, ISBN 978-3-8394-3537-3, 978-3-8376-3537-9.
- Das Digitale und die Denkmalpflege. Bestandserfassung - Denkmalvermittlung - Datenarchivierung - Rekonstruktion verlorener Objekte (with Birgit Franz), Holzminden 2017, ISBN 978-3-95954-030-8.
- Denkmal_Emotion. Politisierung – Mobilisierung – Bindung (with Stephanie Herold), Mitzkat, Holzminden 2021, ISBN 978-3-95954-109-1
