= Zhao Shuxia =

Chinese Author

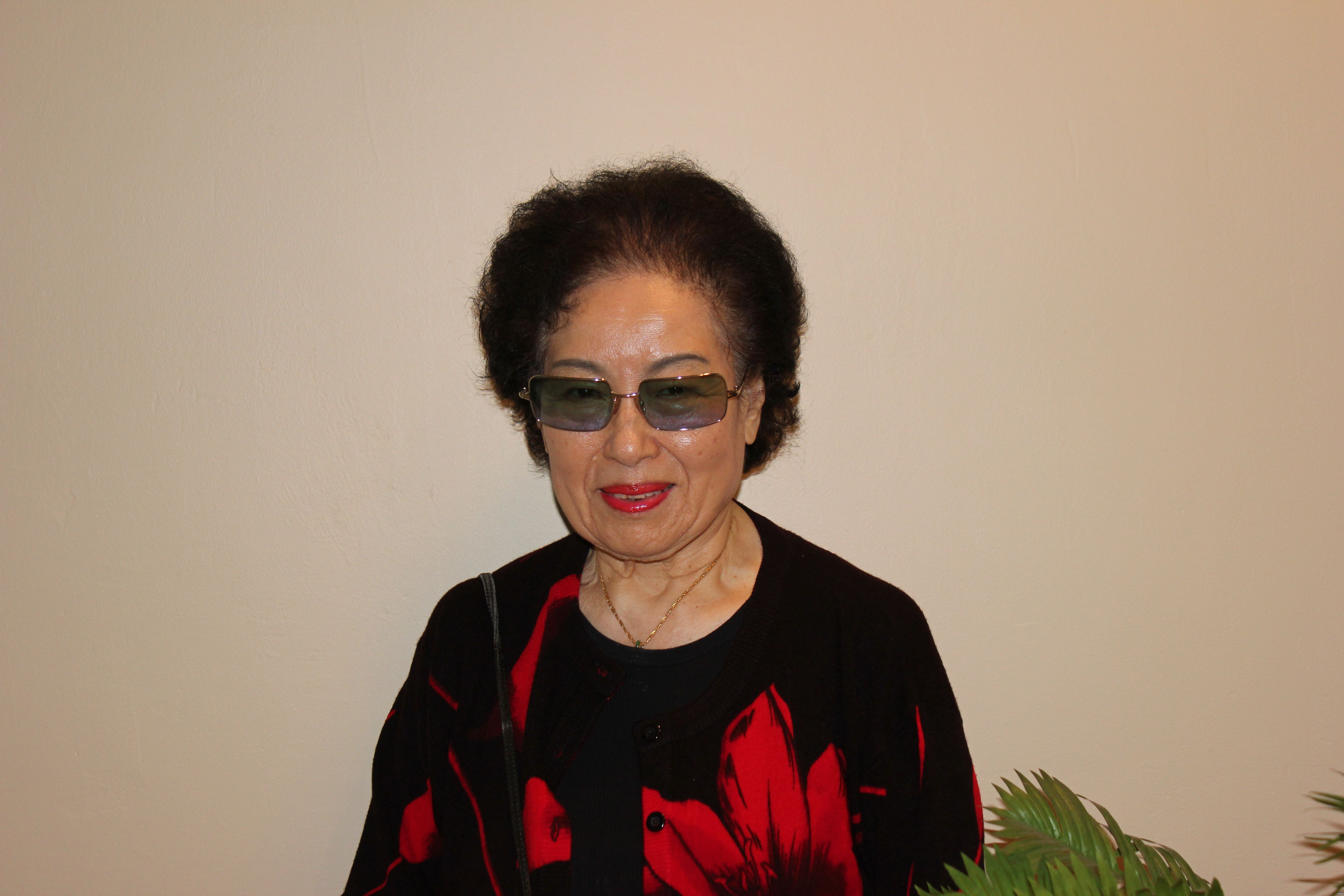
Zhao Shuxia

Zhao Shuxia (Susie Chen 趙淑俠; * 30 December 1931 in Beijing) is a Chinese author.

== Life ==
Zhao Shuxia comes from a Manchurian landowning family, was married to Yannian Chen (physicist), lived in Switzerland from 1961 to 2001 and in the US since 2001.

Zhao is the founder and honorary chairwoman of the Association of Chinese language writers in Europe. She has published short stories, novels and essays in Chinese on experiences of overseas Chinese in Europe. Two volumes of stories ("Traumspuren" 1987, "Der Jadering" 1988) and a novel ("Unser Lied" Vol. 1, 1996) are available in German translation. In the 1980s and 1890s she was one of the most famous Chinese-speaking authors in Europe.

== Works (selection) ==
- Saijinhua (Chinesisch) Taschenbuch • ISBN 7530201735
- Zhao, Shuxia (S: 赵淑侠, P: Zhào Shūxiá). Sai JinhuaBeijing Shiyue Wenyi Chubanshe (Beijing), October 1990. ISBN 9787530201732. - See Google Books page, See Douban page
