= Gaustadt =

Coordinates: 49°54′N 10°51′E

Gaustadt is a district of Bamberg, Upper Franconia in Germany.

Gaustadt has a population of about 6,500. Until 1972 it was a small independent town, but in that year it became part of the City of Bamberg through a referendum.

== Brauerei Kaiserdom ==
One of Gaustadt's principal employers is the Brauerei Kaiserdom, the largest brewery in Bamberg. It was founded in 1718 by Georg Morg. Since 1910, it has been managed by the Wörner family, who in 2016 also purchased the Klosterbräu Bamberg.

In 1953, they brewed 6,000 hectolitres (5,100 US bbl). As of 2016, the brewery reported producing about 320,000 hectolitres (270,000 US bbl).

In 2015, a discarded cigarette caused a large fire at the brewery, resulting in 8 injuries and 2 million euros in damages.

Kaiserdom's current production includes Pilsener, Hefeweizen, Dunkelweizen, Kristallweizen, Schwarzbier, Kellerbier, Dark Lager and non-alcoholic beer. The company also produces soft drinks and since 2024 has operated a bottling line for Fritz-kola.
