= Ou Manling =

Man-Ling Wittchen-Ou is a Taiwanese author living in Germany.

== Life ==
Ou Manling was born Ou Manling (區曼玲) in Taipei, Taiwan. Her father, from mainland China, fled to Taiwan during the Chinese Civil War in 1950.

Ou holds a BA in Foreign Languages and Literatures from National Taiwan University and a master's degree in Theater Science and English Literature from the University of Erlangen-Nuremberg, Germany.

She has been living in Germany for over 20 years. In addition to her native language of Mandarin Chinese, she speaks English and German fluently.

She has published numerous essays and stories. Her work is characterized by acute empathetic insight which is based on keen observation and appreciation of psychology. Though sometimes aimed at social criticism and with dramatic elements, her work does not lack in irony or humor.

Her first book, Of Ribs and Joy – Women of the Bible, contains 22 stories depicting individual women, like Eve, Mary or Herodias, in their particular situations. Using the first person narrative, Ou represents their struggle, sorrow, fear, joy, as well as doubt, showing them as flesh and blood humans, with challenges and emotional turmoil. Ou's intention is to present the figures to the modern reader and acknowledge the Bible as timeless and universal.

Her second book, The Cliff, is a novella exploring themes such as friendship, redemption, second chance and a new beginning. Ching-Hsi Perng, emeritus professor of National Taiwan University, comments on The Cliff: “…Coming to the end, my eyes were blurred with tears. It’s been a long time since I’ve been so touched by a piece of literature… the story is so well organized, and written with such elegance and clarity. Overall, this is an excellent piece.”

Ou enjoys art, architecture and playing the piano. She gives guided tours at the well-known Vitra Design Museum in Weil am Rhein, and is a frequent lecturer on various topics.

== Books ==
- Scarred Face (鬼面). Taipei: 秀威少年, 2016. ISBN 9789865731557.
- Because of Love (留下，因為愛). Taipei: 釀出版, 2015. ISBN 9789865696979.
- The Cliff (躍崖). Taipei: 秀威少年, 2013. ISBN 9789868952126.
- Of Ribs and Joy – Women of the Bible (「肋」在其中：聖經的女人故事). Taipei: 新銳文創, 2013. ISBN 9789865915728.
- Spolin, Viola. 劇場遊戲指導手冊. Translated by Ou. Taipei: 書林出版有限公司, 1998. ISBN 9575867785.
