= Klosterbräu Bamberg =

Brewery in Bamberg, Bavaria, Germany

- Industry: Restaurant
- Founded: 1533
- Headquarters: Obere Mühlbrücke 1-3, 96049 Bamberg, Germany
- Website: www.klosterbraeu.de

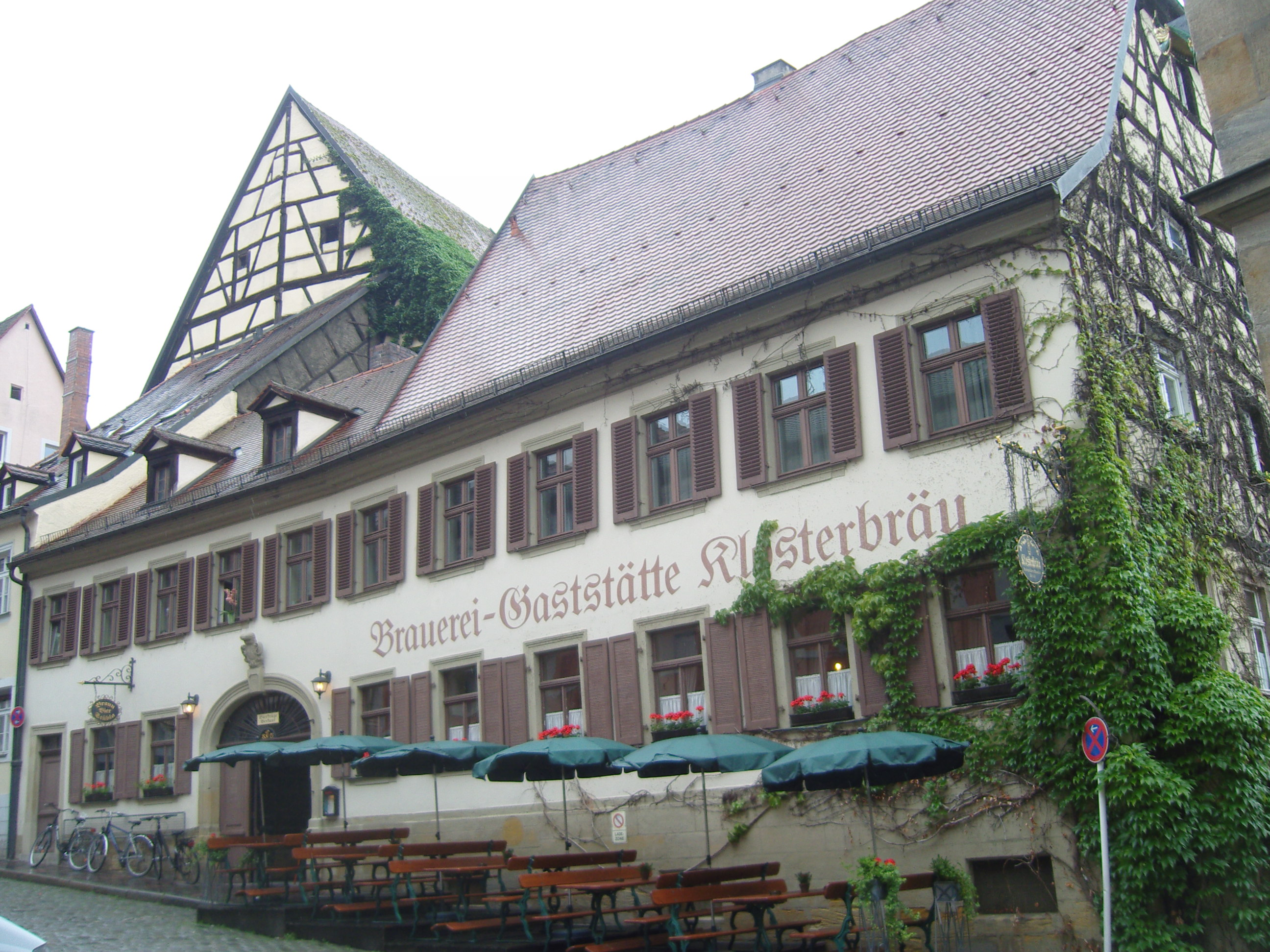
Klosterbräu Bamberg

Klosterbräu Bamberg is the oldest brewery in Bamberg, Upper Franconia, Germany. It is located in the so-called Mühlenviertel near the river Regnitz. The annual output is about 4,000 hectoliters.

== History ==
Klosterbräu was named after the nearby Franciscan monastery of Bamberg and was founded as a Prince-Bishopric's dark beer house in 1533. The house was first mentioned as a brewery in 1333. Until 1790, the Bierhaus was owned by the archbishops.

== See also ==
- List of oldest companies
