= Al-Tufula Center =

Women's center in Nazareth

- Al-Tufula Pedagogical & Multipurpose Women's Center
- مركز الطّفولة
- Formation: 1984; 42 years ago
- Founder: Nabila Espanioly
- Director: Nabila Espanioly

The Al-Tufula Center (also the Al-Tufula Pedagogical Center or Al-Tufula Pedagogical & Multipurpose Women's Center) is a women's center in Nazareth which focuses on early childhood education and women's rights. It was established in 1989, and its founder and director is Nabila Espanioly.

The work of the Al-Tufula Center is intended to support Arab women in Israel.
