= 2025 in Poland =

- Decades: 2000s; 2010s; 2020s
- See also: Other events of 2025; Timeline of Polish history

The following lists the events of the year 2025 in Poland.

== Incumbents ==
Incumbents
Position	Person	Party
President	Andrzej Duda (until 6 August)	Independent (Supported by Law and Justice)
President	Karol Nawrocki (since 6 August)	Independent (Supported by Law and Justice)
Prime Minister	Donald Tusk	Civic Platform
Marshal of the Sejm	Szymon Hołownia (until 18 November)	Poland 2050
Marshal of the Sejm	Włodzimierz Czarzasty (from 18 November)	Lewica
Marshal of the Senate	Małgorzata Kidawa-Błońska	Civic Platform

== Events ==
=== January ===
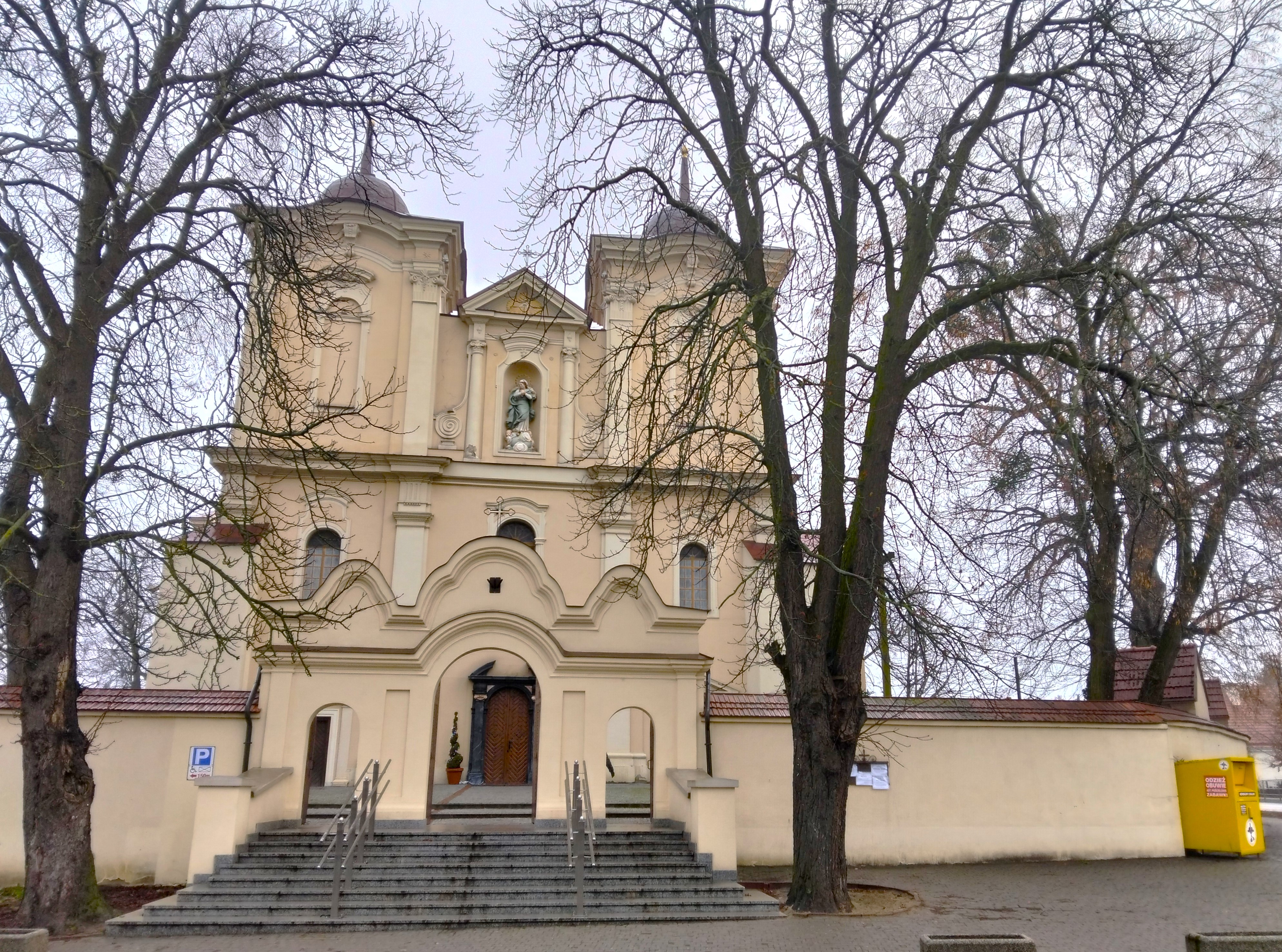
Baroque church in Końskowola in 2024

- 1 January – Seven localities are granted town rights: Kazanów, Kobylnica, Końskowola, Kurów, Sobków, Wąwolnica, and Zaniemyśl.
- 22 January – 5 miners are killed while 13 others are injured in a methane fire at the Szczygłowice Coal Mine near Siemianowice Śląskie.
- 27 January – A magnitude 3.1 earthquake hits Silesian Voivodeship, killing a miner and injuring 11 others in Radlin.

=== February ===
- 5 February – The European General Court upholds the European Commission's decision to withhold 320 million euros ($332 million) from payments to Poland as part of a fine imposed on the then-Law and Justice government regarding its judicial overhaul in 2021.
- 13 February – Solidarity endorses Karol Nawrocki, the Law and Justice (PiS) candidate for the 2025 Polish presidential election
- 21 February – A court in Wrocław sentences a Ukrainian national to eight years' imprisonment for plotting arson attacks on behalf of Russia.
- 27 February – A magnitude 3.1 earthquake hits Lower Silesian Voivodeship, injuring a miner in Polkowice.

=== March ===
- 20 March – A Ukrainian national is arrested in Masovian Voivodeship on suspicion of spying for Russia.
- 26 March – President Duda signs a law temporarily restricting the right of application for international protection for those entering Poland illegally.

=== April ===
- 23 April – 4 May – XIX International Chopin Piano Competition
- 29 April – A magnitude 3.0 earthquake hits Silesian Voivodeship, injuring two miners in Ruda Śląska.

=== May ===
- 7 May – One person is killed in an axe attack inside the University of Warsaw. The attacker is arrested.
- 10 May – Bogdanka LUK Lublin wins its first Polish Volleyball Championship, defeating Warta Zawiercie in the finals (see 2024–25 PlusLiga).
- 12 May – The Polish government orders the closure of the Russian consulate in Kraków following authorities blaming a fire that destroyed the Marywilska 44 shopping center in 2024 on arson orchestrated by Moscow.
- 17 May – Poland's Justyna Steczkowska finishes in 14th place at Eurovision 2025 in Switzerland with the single "Gaja".
- 18 May – 2025 Polish presidential election (first round): Rafał Trzaskowski wins a plurality of the vote with 31.1%, followed by Karol Nawrocki with 29.1%.
- 24 May – Lech Poznań wins its ninth Polish Football Championship (see 2024–25 Ekstraklasa).
- 28 May – Twenty-eight people are arrested following clashes between Chelsea and Real Betis supporters ahead of the 2025 UEFA Conference League final in Wrocław.

=== June ===
- 1 June – 2025 Polish presidential election (second round): Karol Nawrocki is elected president with 50.9% of the vote.
- 4 June – Wisła Płock wins its ninth Polish Handball Championship, defeating Industria Kielce in the finals (see 2024–25 Superliga).
- 11 June – Prime Minister Donald Tusk survives a vote of confidence in the Sejm.
- 15 – 27 June – 2025 UEFA Women's Under-19 Championship
- 17 June – The Third Way is dissolved as an electoral alliance.
- 18 – 29 June – 2025 Men's Junior World Handball Championship

=== July ===
- 6 July – Poland imposes temporary border controls on crossings with Germany in Lithuania as part of efforts to curb the flow of irregular asylum-seekers.
- 17 July – Three doctors are convicted of involuntary manslaughter and are sentenced to up to 18 months' imprisonment and a six-year ban on practicing medicine over the death of a pregnant woman from sepsis in Pszczyna in 2021 that led to nationwide protests over alleged links to anti-abortion laws.
- 19 July – Anti-immigration protests organised by Konfederacja are held across Poland.
- 21 July – A light aircraft crashes in Strąkowa, Lower Silesian Voivodeship, injuring the two people on board.
- 22 July – A magnitude 3.5 earthquake hits the Lower Silesian Voivodeship, injuring a miner at the Polkowice-Sieroszowice mine.
- 29 July – Authorities announce the arrest of 32 people on suspicion of carrying out sabotage attacks on behalf of Russia.

=== August ===
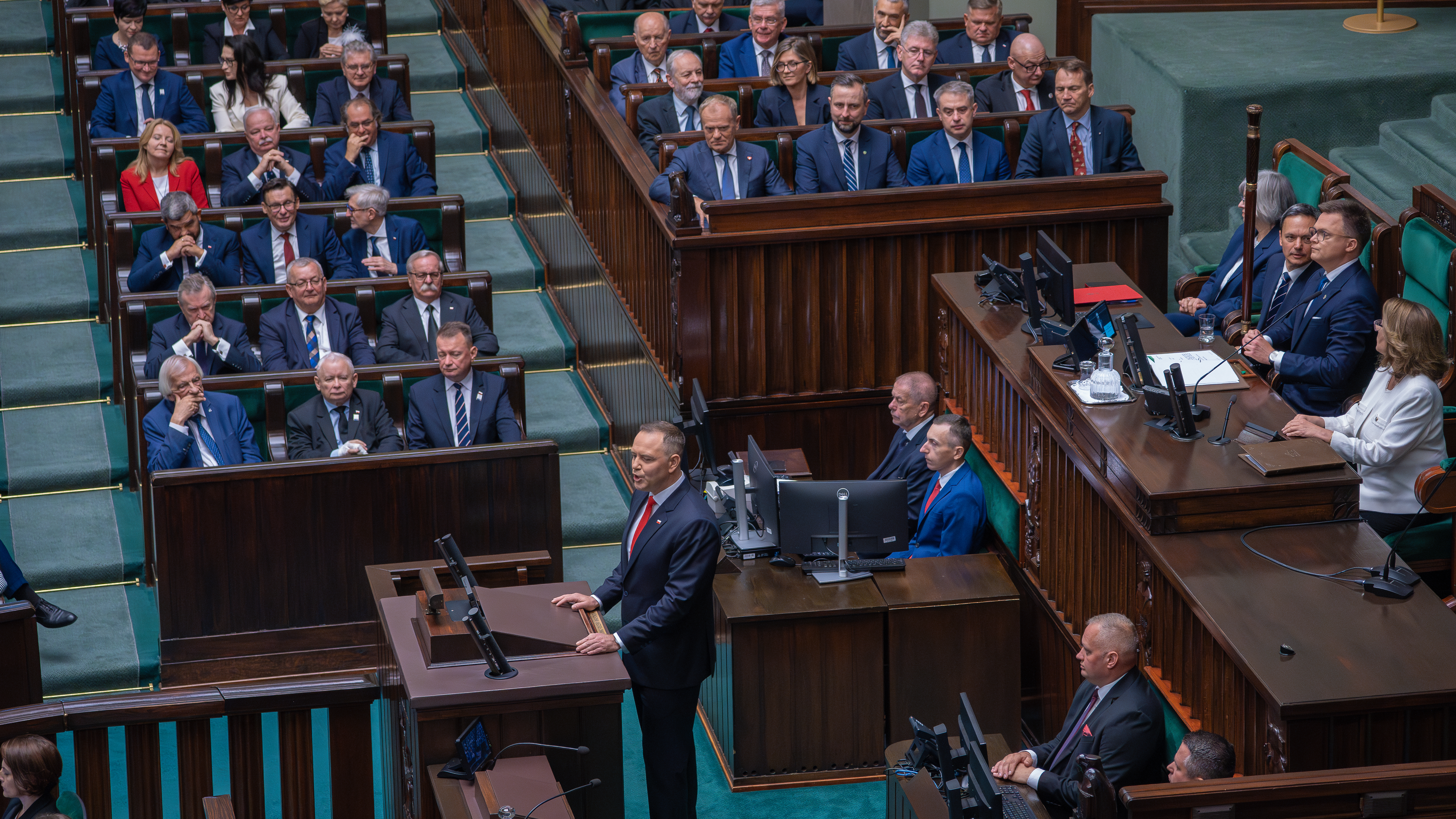
Karol Nawrocki presidential inauguration

- 6 August – Karol Nawrocki is inaugurated as president.
- 9 August – More than 100 people are arrested for rioting during a concert by Belarusian rapper Max Korzh at the Stadion Narodowy in Warsaw.
- 11 August – A magnitude 2.3 earthquake hits the Silesian Voivodeship, killing a miner at the Szczygłowice Coal Mine.
- 20 August – A suspected Russian military drone crashes into a cornfield near Osiny, Łuków County, in Lublin Voivodeship.
- 21 August – The Maków County council voted to accept a citizens' initiative, enthroning Jesus Christ as the "King of Powiat Maków" and declared 21 June as "Day of Jesus Christ King of the Powiat". The Voivodeship authorities would invalidated the law in September 2025.
- 25 August – President Nawrocki vetoes a bill that would have extended financial support for Ukrainians fleeing the Russo-Ukrainian war as well as funding for Starlink systems to maintain Ukraine's internet connectivity. A revised version of the bill is subsequently signed on September 29.
- 26 August – A magnitude 2.0 earthquake hits the Silesian Voivodeship, injuring three people at the Mysłowice-Wesoła Coal Mine.
- 27 August – 14 September – EuroBasket 2025 in Cyprus, Finland, Latvia and Poland
- 28 August – An F-16 fighter jet of the Polish Air Force crashes during a rehearsal for the Radom Air Show in Radom, killing the pilot.

=== September ===
- 9 September – Poland orders the expulsion of a Belarusian diplomat for spying and arrests a suspected Belarusian spy.
- 9–10 September – Russian drone incursion into Poland: Poland says that it shot down Russian drones which violated its airspace during a Russian attack on Ukraine.
- 12 September –
  - A magnitude 4.5 earthquake hits the Lower Silesian Voivodeship, injuring one person at the Rudna mine.
  - Poland closes its border with Belarus amid the beginning of the Zapad 2025 joint Russian-Belarusian military exercise.
- 15 September – A Ukrainian and a Belarusian national are arrested on suspicion of flying a drone over sensitive government facilities in Warsaw, including over the Belweder palace.
- 28 September
  - Poland wins the bronze medal at the 21st FIVB Volleyball Men's World Championship in the Philippines after defeating Czechia in four sets (25-18, 23-25, 25-22, 25-21).
  - KS Toruń wins its fifth Team Speedway Polish Championship, defeating Motor Lublin in the finals (see 2025 Polish speedway season).
- 30 September – Nord Stream pipelines sabotage: Authorities arrest a Ukrainian diver in Pruszków, Masovian Voivodeship, who is suspected of his involvement in the 2022 Nord Stream pipeline explosions in the Baltic Sea.

=== October ===
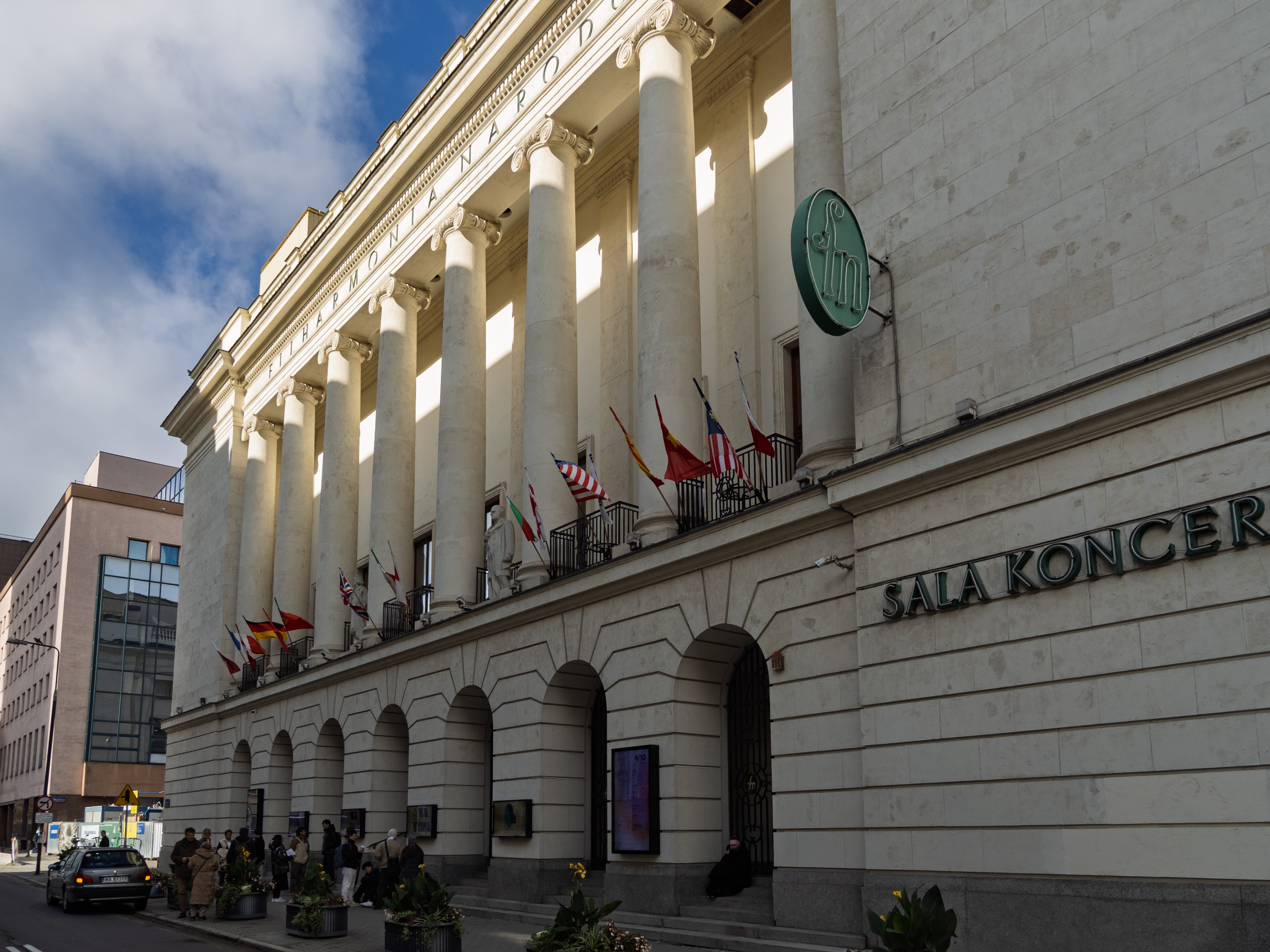
National Philharmonic in Warsaw during the XIX International Chopin Piano Competition

- 4 October – 2025 Speedway of Nations final at MotoArena stadium in Toruń.
- 7 October – The European Parliament lifts the immunity of Polish MEPs Daniel Obajtek and Michał Dworczyk as part of a corruption investigation against them.
- 20 October – The Via Baltica connecting Poland and the Baltic States is inaugurated in a ceremony led by President Nawrocki and Lithuanian president Gitanas Nausėda at the Lithuania–Poland border.
- 21 October – Eight people, including three Ukrainian nationals, are arrested on suspicion of plotting sabotage attacks in Poland.

=== November ===
- 6 November – President Karol Nawrocki, signs an application to the Constitutional Tribunal to ban Polish Communist Party.
- 7 November – The Sejm lifts the parliamentary immunity of former justice minister Zbigniew Ziobro, clearing the way for prosecutors to charge him with 26 offences, including abuse of power and misuse of public funds from the Justice Fund.
- 16 November – A suspected sabotage attack is carried out on sections of the Warsaw-Lublin railway near Mika, Masovian Voivodeship and Puławy, Lublin Voivodeship. Two Ukrainian citizens are identified as suspects.
- 19 November – Poland orders the closure of the Russian consulate in Gdańsk after accusing Moscow of carrying out sabotage attacks on its railway systems.
- 23 November – South Korean pianist Roh Hyunjin wins the 13th International Paderewski Piano Competition held at the Pomeranian Philharmonic in Bydgoszcz, Kuyavian–Pomeranian Voivodeship.
- 25 November — The European Court of Justice orders Poland to recognize same-sex marriages registered in other EU member-states in the case of a Polish couple who married in Germany and had their certificate rejected by Polish authorities.

=== December ===
- 1 December – 73 Polish-Teutonic documents from the 13th-15th centuries, stolen by Germany from Warsaw during World War II, were returned by Germany to Poland.
- 3 December – The Polish Communist Party is declared unlawful by the Constitutional Tribunal.
- 10 December – Three Spanish nationals are injured in an attack near Ostrow Mazowiecka on supporters of Rayo Vallecano travelling for a 2025–26 UEFA Conference League match in against Jagiellonia Białystok. Seven people are arrested.
- 18 December – The European Court of Justice rules that the Polish Constitutional Tribunal had disregarded EU law and was not operating in an "independent and impartial" manner due to politicized appointments made by the previous Law and Justice government.

== Holidays ==
- 1 January – New Year's Day
- 6 January – Epiphany
- 20 April – Easter Sunday
- 21 April – Easter Monday
- 1 May – May Day

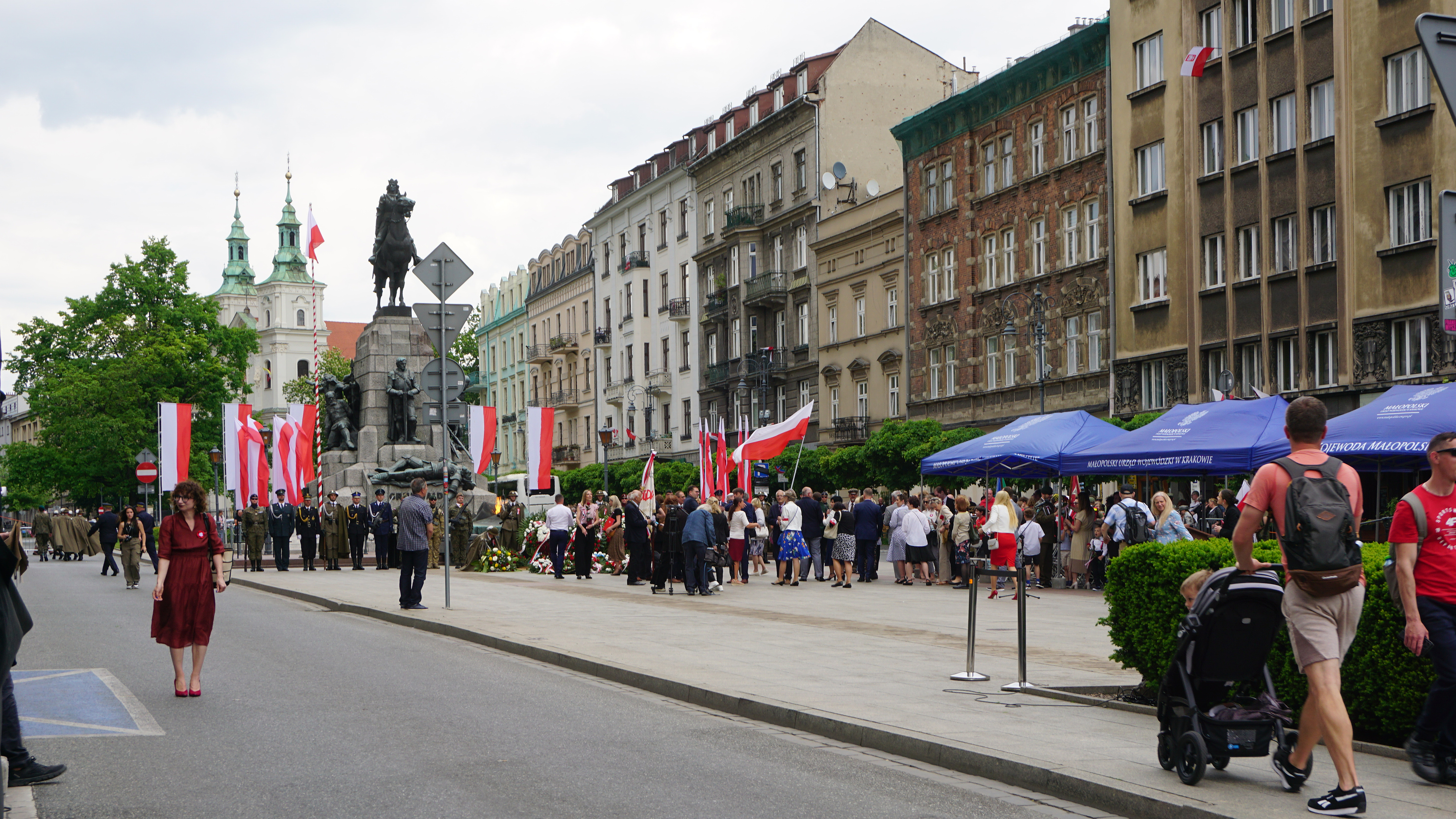
2025 3 May Constitution Day in Kraków

- 3 May – 3 May Constitution Day
- 8 June – Whit Sunday
- 19 June – Corpus Christi
- 15 August – Assumption Day
- 1 November – All Saints' Day
- 11 November – Independence Day
- 24 December – Christmas Eve
- 25 December – Christmas Day
- 26 December – 2nd Day of Christmas

== Art and entertainment ==
- List of Polish submissions for the Academy Award for Best International Feature Film

== Deaths ==
=== January ===
- 1 January – Zdzisław Skupień, 86, mathematician
- 2 January – Karol Krasnodębski, 95, politician
- 6 January
  - Krzysztof Sońta, 56, politician
  - Ludwik Zalewski, 70, politician, senator (2005–2007).
- 7 January – Mirosława Marcheluk, 86, actress
- 9 January
  - Andrzej Marian Bartczak, 79, artist and educator.
  - Mariusz Trynkiewicz, 62, serial killer and sex offender
- 10 January
  - Andrzej Kraśnicki, 75, sport activist.
  - Longin Pastusiak, 89, politician
- 11 January – Barbara Rylska, 89, actress
- 12 January – Witold Dąbrowski, 92, politician, voivode of Siedlce (1975–1977).
- 14 January – Michał Janiszewski, 70, politician, MP (1991–1993, 1997–2001).
- 18 January – Jan Mycielski, 92, mathematician (Ehrenfeucht–Mycielski sequence, Mycielskian).
- 24 January
  - Marcin Wicha, 52, graphic designer and writer.
  - Mirosław Żak, 88, geodesist and academic.

=== February ===
- 1 February – Leon Wróbel, 70, sailor
- 10 February – Wojciech Dziembowski, 85, astronomer
- 14 February – Barbara Rybałtowska, 88, writer, singer, songwriter, actress and painter.
- 15 February – Michał Czajkowski, 90, Catholic priest and Security Service collaborator
- 17 February – Krystyna Daszkiewicz, 100, professor of law at the Adam Mickiewicz University in Poznań
- 18 February – Marian Turski, 98, historian, journalist and Holocaust survivor
- 19 February – Jan Eugeniusz Krysiński, 89, former rector of the Łódź University of Technology
- 25 February – Kazimierz Romaniuk, 97, Catholic bishop
- 28 February – Stanisław Gebhardt, 96, economist and activist

=== March ===
- 15 March – Barbara Skrzypek, 66, government official
- 23 March – Bogdan Daras, 65, wrestler
- 29 March – Stefan Hula Sr., 77, skier

=== April ===
- 14 April – Piotr Turzyński, 61, auxiliary bishop
- 15 April – Jadwiga Jankowska-Cieślak, 74, actress
- 24 April – Andrzej Fiedor, 79, biathlete

=== May ===
- 3 May – Sylwester Wilczek, 89, ice hockey player
- 4 May – Jerzy Pasiński, 77, politician and former mayor of Gdańsk
- 16 May – Jadwiga Rappé, 73, opera singer
- 18 May Andrzej Matysiak, 77, canoeist
- 21 May – Leszek Górski, 63, swimmer
- 27 May – Agata Kowalska-Szubert, 57, scholar

=== June ===
- 8 June – Ewa Dałkowska, 78, actress
- 10 June – Marek Trojanowicz, 81, chemist
- 13 June – Piotr Nowina-Konopka, 76, politician and diplomat
- 16 June – Krystyna Palmowska, 76, mountaineer
- 21 June – Danuta Kobylińska-Walas, 93, sea captain

=== July ===
- 17 July – Joanna Kołaczkowska, 59, actress
- 18 July – Michał Bałasz, 102, architect
- 18 July – Edward Kupczyński, 96, speedway rider
- 20 July – Urszula Kozioł, 92, poet
- 26 July – Piotr Łossowski, 100, historian and academic
- 27 July – Jerzy Sztwiertnia, 78, film director

=== August ===
- 13 August – Marian Błażej Kruszyłowicz, 90, Roman Catholic prelate, auxiliary bishop of Szczecin-Kamień (1989–2013).
- 20 August – Józef Kowalczyk, 86, Roman Catholic prelate, archbishop of Gniezno and primate of Poland (2010–2014).

=== October ===
- 10 October – Adam Strzembosz, 95, first president of the Supreme Court (1990–1998).
- 23 October – Maciej Adamkiewicz, 59, pharmaceutical entrepreneur and surgeon.
- 31 October – Elżbieta Penderecka, 77, patron of the arts and cultural activist.

=== November ===
- 5 November – Barbara Ptak, 95, costume designer (Pharaoh, Pearl in the Crown, The Promised Land).
- 17 November – Antoni Jackowski, 90, human geographer.
- 27 November – Agnieszka Maciąg, 56, model and actress.

=== December ===
- 4 December – Rafał Kołsut, 35, voice actor.
- 12 December –
  - Bolesław Rakoczy, 82, historian.
  - Władysław Siemaszko, 106, publicist, lawyer, and author.
