= 2023 in Poland =

- Decades: 2000s; 2010s; 2020s
- See also: Other events of 2023; Timeline of Polish history

Events in the year 2023 in Poland.

== Incumbents ==
Incumbents
Position	Person	Party	Notes
President	Andrzej Duda	Independent (Supported by Law and Justice)	
Prime Minister	Mateusz Morawiecki	Law and Justice	Until 13 December
Prime Minister	Donald Tusk	Civic Platform	From 13 December
Marshal of the Sejm	Elżbieta Witek	Law and Justice	Until 12 November
Marshal of the Sejm	Szymon Hołownia	Poland 2050	From 13 November
Marshal of the Senate	Tomasz Grodzki	Civic Platform	Until 12 November
Marshal of the Senate	Małgorzata Kidawa-Błońska	Civic Platform	From 13 November

== Elections ==
Bold indicates government parties.

2023 Polish parliamentary election
Party		Leader	Sejm			Senate
English	Polish	Leader	Seats	Popular vote	Percentage	Seats
Law and Justice	Prawo i Sprawiedliwość	Jarosław Kaczyński	194 / 460	7,640,854	35.39%	34 / 100
Civic Coalition	**Koalicja Obywatelska**	**Donald Tusk**	157 / 460	**6,629,402**	**30.70%**	41 / 100
Third Way	**Trzecia Droga**	**Szymon Hołownia** **Władysław Kosiniak-Kamysz**	65 / 460	**3,110,670**	**14.41%**	11 / 100
The Left	**Lewica**	**Włodzimierz Czarzasty** **Robert Biedroń**	26 / 460	**1,859,018**	**8.61%**	9 / 100
Confederation	Konfederacja Wolność i Niepodległość	Sławomir Mentzen Krzysztof Bosak	18 / 460	1,547,364	7.17%	0 / 100
Independents	Niezależni	N/A				5 / 100
Other			0 / 460	805,987 (Total)	3.72% (Total)	0 / 100
Total and turnout			460	21,402,998	74.38%	100

== Events ==
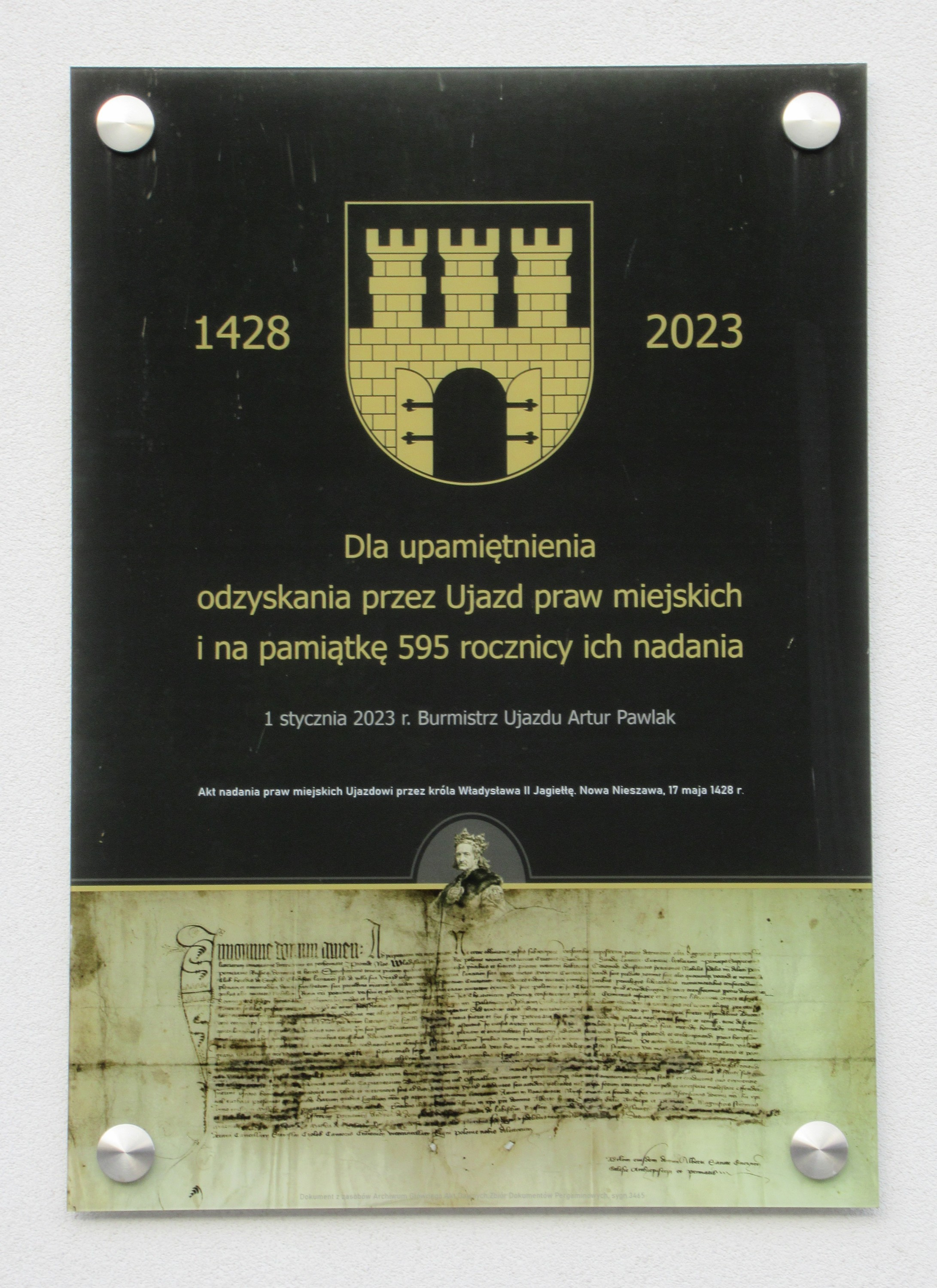
Plaque commemorating the restoration of town rights in Ujazd

- 1 January – 15 localities were granted town rights: Bodzanów, Czarny Dunajec, Dąbrowice, Jadów, Jastrząb, Jeżów, Książ Wielki, Latowicz, Łopuszno, Miasteczko Krajeńskie, Miękinia, Piekoszów, Rozprza, Ujazd, and Włodowice. For 12 it was a restoration of previously revoked town status.
- 3 January – CVC Capital Partners signes a preliminary agreement for the sale of PKP Energetyka to state owned power company PGE.
- 10 January – the Polish town of Świdnik abolished their LGBT-free zone in response to fearing that they would stop receiving EU subsidies.
- 9 February – Poland announces the closure of a major border crossing with Belarus "until further notice" amid heightened tensions between the two countries. There are currently only two checkpoints open between the two nations.
- 25 February – Refiner PKN Orlen announces that Russia has suspended oil exports to Poland via the northern branch of the Druzhba pipeline.
- 3 April – state owned power company PGE takes over PKP Energetyka.
- 5 April – President of Ukraine Volodymyr Zelenskyy makes an official visit to Poland. During his meeting with Polish President Andrzej Duda, Zelenskyy receives the Order of the White Eagle, Poland's highest order.
- 7 May – Raków Częstochowa won their first Polish Football Championship (see 2022–23 Ekstraklasa).
- 10 May – Jastrzębski Węgiel won their third Polish Volleyball Championship defeating ZAKSA Kędzierzyn-Koźle in the finals (see 2022–23 PlusLiga).
- 26 May – Poland's Parliament voted for a law that will establish a commission to investigate alleged Russian influence during the period from 2007 to 2022. The law was accepted by president Andrzej Duda. The law was widely criticised for being non-democratic and an attempt to eliminate opposition politicians and followers.
- 30 May – far-right politician Grzegorz Braun disrupted a lecture on the Holocaust by the historian Jan Grabowski at the German Historical Institute in Warsaw by storming in and destroying the microphone and speakers. Braun has been quoted accusing Jews of being "the enemies of Poland" and alleging their desire to undertake a "hostile takeover" of Polish territory and to place ethnic Poles in reservations.
- 4 June – 2023 Polish protests, former Prime Minister Donald Tusk, together with several other members of the Civic Platform party, organized a series of anti-government protests in Warsaw, Poland's capital city: The protests in Warsaw were notably attended by former President and Solidarity leader Lech Wałęsa.
- 15 June
  - Jarosław Kaczyński, leader of the Law and Justice party, says that the government might hold a referendum on EU migration policy. The referendum would be similar to the 2016 Hungarian migrant quota referendum.
  - King Szczecin won their first Polish Basketball Championship defeating Śląsk Wrocław in the finals (see 2022–23 PLK season).

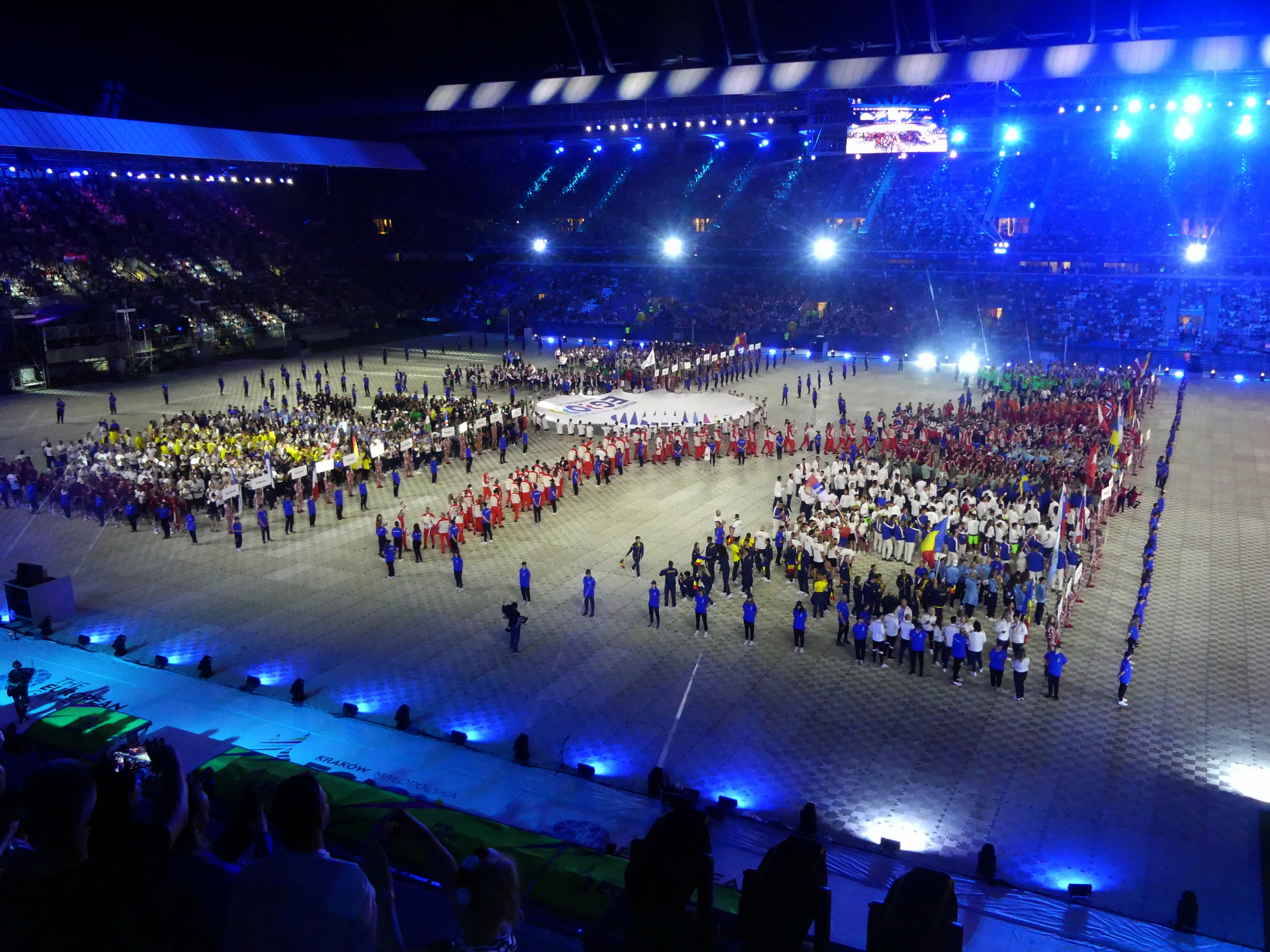
Opening ceremony of the 2023 European Games in Kraków, 21 June 2023

- 21 June–2 July – 2023 European Games held in Kraków.
- 30 June – Świna Tunnel in Świnoujście opened.
- 10 August – Poland sends 10 thousand troops to guard its border with Belarus.
- 11 August – Nearly 14,000 residents of the city of Lublin, are ordered to evacuate, after an unexploded bomb was found yesterday at the site of a pre-World War II factory.
- 27 August – Police arrest two male Polish citizens suspected of hacking into the national railway communication system, disrupting rail traffic in Poland and issuing false signals.
- 15 September – The Polish Ministry of Foreign Affairs fires its legal chief and cancels all contracts to outsource visa applications after seven are charged in a visas-for-cash scandal.
- 19 September – Polish cash-for-visa scandal, Civic Platform MP Michał Szczerba reveals alleged documents from the Ministry of Foreign Affairs indicating that the Polish embassy in Minsk issued 784,173 visas to individuals from 65 countries with the assistance of a Moscow-based company. It is further claimed by Szczerba that among those issued visas are people who were pushed back from the border during the Belarus–European Union border crisis.
- 20 September
  - Prime Minister Mateusz Morawiecki announces that Poland will stop supplying Ukraine with weapons, amid tensions between the two countries over the former's import ban on Ukrainian agricultural products.
  - Vasyl Zvarych, Ukrainian Ambassador to Poland, is summoned by the Polish Foreign Ministry to convey its strong protest over the statement of President Volodymyr Zelenskyy at the United Nations General Assembly. Zelenskyy's statement that some European countries' actions indirectly help Russia, drew condemnation from Poland.
- 24 September – Motor Lublin won their second Team Speedway Polish Championship defeating Sparta Wrocław in the finals (see 2023 Polish speedway season).
- 15 October
  - 2023 Polish parliamentary election and 2023 Polish referendum: Poles elect members of the upper house of the parliament (the Senate) and the lower house (the Sejm). Votes are also cast in a referendum on migration, removal of the border wall between Belarus and Poland, and the retirement age.
  - Exit polls suggest that Poland's opposition parties, led by the Civic Coalition under former prime minister Donald Tusk, are poised to secure a parliamentary majority, potentially ending the eight-year governance of the Law and Justice (PiS) party. The exit poll voter turnout reaches a record of 73%.
  - 2023 Polish referendum Results: 96.79% voted against the admission of thousands of illegal immigrants from the Middle East and Africa, 96.49% voted against selling off of state assets to foreign entities, 96.04% voted against the removal of the barrier on the border between Poland and Belarus, 94.61% voted against increasing the retirement age, however the main opposition parties boycott the referendum results in a turnout of only 40.91% which was less than the minimum validity threshold of 50%. Which meant the results were not legally binding.
- 13 November – Poland 2050 leader Szymon Hołownia is elected as Marshal of the Sejm.
- 27 November – President Andrzej Duda appoints the Third Cabinet of Mateusz Morawiecki, a Law and Justice minority government. It is not expected to survive a motion of confidence and is criticized by the opposition as a tactic to delay the transition of power.
- 29 November – National Security Bureau chief Jacek Siewiera announces that Poland will send "a team of military advisors" to the Finland–Russia border in response to an official request for allied support. Russia warns against the move, viewing the concentration of troops on the border as a threat.
- 11 December – The Third Cabinet of Mateusz Morawiecki loses a motion of confidence. The Sejm nominates Donald Tusk as the new Prime Minister-designate with an absolute majority of votes.
- 12 December – far-right politician Grzegorz Braun during the first session of the 10th term of Sejm, put out a Hanukkah menorah by spraying it with a fire extinguisher, saying that "The people participating in the Satanic cult should be ashamed".
- 13 December – Donald Tusk becomes Prime Minister of Poland in the aftermath of the October parliamentary election.
- 19 December – The start of the 2023 Polish public media crisis. The new Liberal government dismissed the directors of TVP, Polish Radio and Polish Press Agency. The move was met with criticism and accusations of illegality by the dismissed management and the opposition Law and Justice (PiS) party, causing a parliamentary intervention in the TVP headquarters.
- 29 December – Russia launches the largest wave of drones and missiles on Ukrainian cities since the start of the war in a widespread overnight assault on cities across the country, killing at least 39 people and injuring at least 160 others. One of the Russian cruise missiles enters NATO airspace as it travels over Polish territory, prompting the Polish government to summon the Russian charge d'affaires for an explanation.

== Holidays ==
- 1 January - New Year's Day
- 6 January - Epiphany
- 9 April - Easter Sunday
- 10 April - Easter Monday
- 1 May - May Day
- 3 May - 3 May Constitution Day
- 28 May - Whit Sunday
- 8 June - Corpus Christi
- 15 August - Assumption Day
- 1 November - All Saints' Day

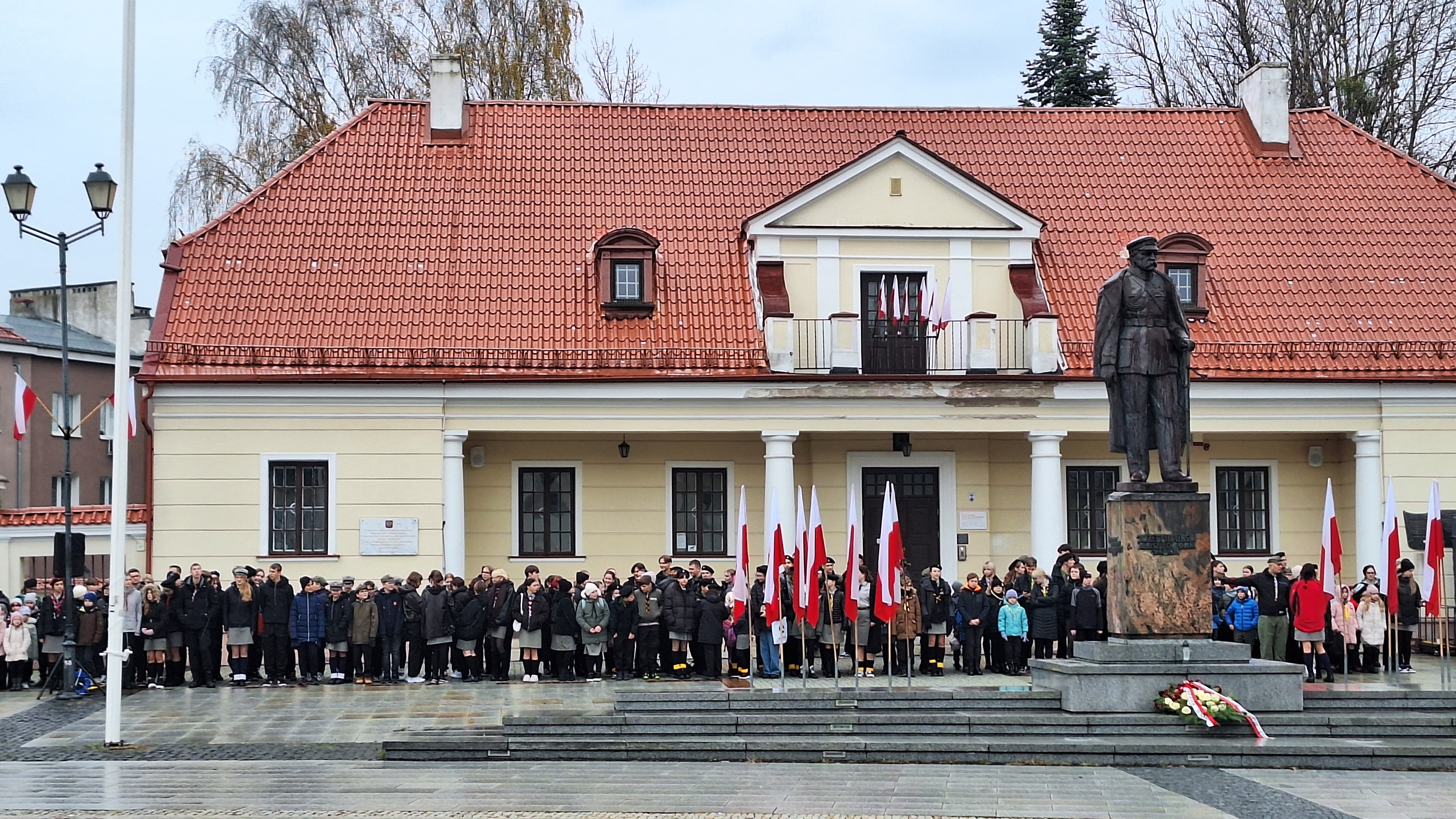
2023 Independence Day in Białystok

- 11 November - Independence Day
- 25 December - Christmas Day
- 26 December – 2nd Day of Christmas

== Deaths ==
- 4 January – Stefan Wojnecki, 93, photographer and academic.
- 9 January –
  - Stefan Brzózka, 91, chess player.
  - Wacław Sadkowski, 89, literary critic and translator, editor of Literatura na Świecie and president of Czytelnik Publishing House.
- 11 January – Jan Ludwiczak, 85, coal miner and Solidarity activist.
- 13 January – Zenon Pigoń, 82, trade unionist and politician, MP (1989–1991).
- 17 January – Maria Dworzecka, 81, Polish-American physicist and Holocaust survivor.
- 21 January –
  - Marek Plura, 52, politician and psychotherapist, MEP (2014–2019).
  - Włodzimierz Sroka, 55, economist and manager.
- 25 January – Franciszek Jamroż, 79, trade unionist and politician, mayor of Gdańsk (1991–1994).
- 27 January – Aleksander Krawczuk, 100, historian, minister of culture (1986–1989) and MP (1991–1997).
- 29 January – Piotr Waśko, 61, politician, MP (2007–2011).
- 31 January – Anna Czerwińska, 73, mountaineer.
- 27 September – Urszula Koszut, 82, operatic soprano.
- 24 October – Wanda Półtawska, 101, physician, author, Holocaust survivor and pro-life activist.
- 13 December – Wojciech Łazarek, 86, footballer and manager.
