= Skupień =

Skupień is a Polish family name and in Wikipedia may refer to:

- Mitch Skupien, manager and executive in the All-American Girls Professional Baseball League.
- Witold Skupień (born 1989), Polish Paralympic cross-country skier
- Wojciech Skupień (born 1976), Polish ski jumper
- Zdzisław Skupień (1938–2025), Polish mathematician
