= Krasnodębski =

Krasnodębski is a surname. Notable people with the surname include:

- Karol Krasnodębski (1929–2025), Polish politician
- Zdzisław Krasnodębski (1904–1980), Polish pilot
- Zdzisław Krasnodębski (sociologist) (born 1953), Polish sociologist
