= Rakoczy =

Rakoczy is a Polish surname. Notable people with the surname include:

- Bolesław Rakoczy (1943–2025), Polish historian
- Elizabeth Rakoczy, Hungarian-born molecular ophthalmologist
- Gregg Rakoczy (born 1965), American football player
- Helena Rakoczy (1921–2014), Polish artistic gymnast
- Jessica Rakoczy (born 1977), Canadian former boxer and mixed martial artist
- Michał Rakoczy (born 2002), Polish professional football player
- Paweł Rakoczy (born 1987), Polish javelin thrower
- Tadeusz Rakoczy (born 1938), Polish Roman Catholic bishop

== See also ==
- Rakoczy's Lieutenant, a 1954 Hungarian historical adventure film
