= Szczygłowice Coal Mine =

Mine in Knurów, Poland

Szczygłowice coal mine
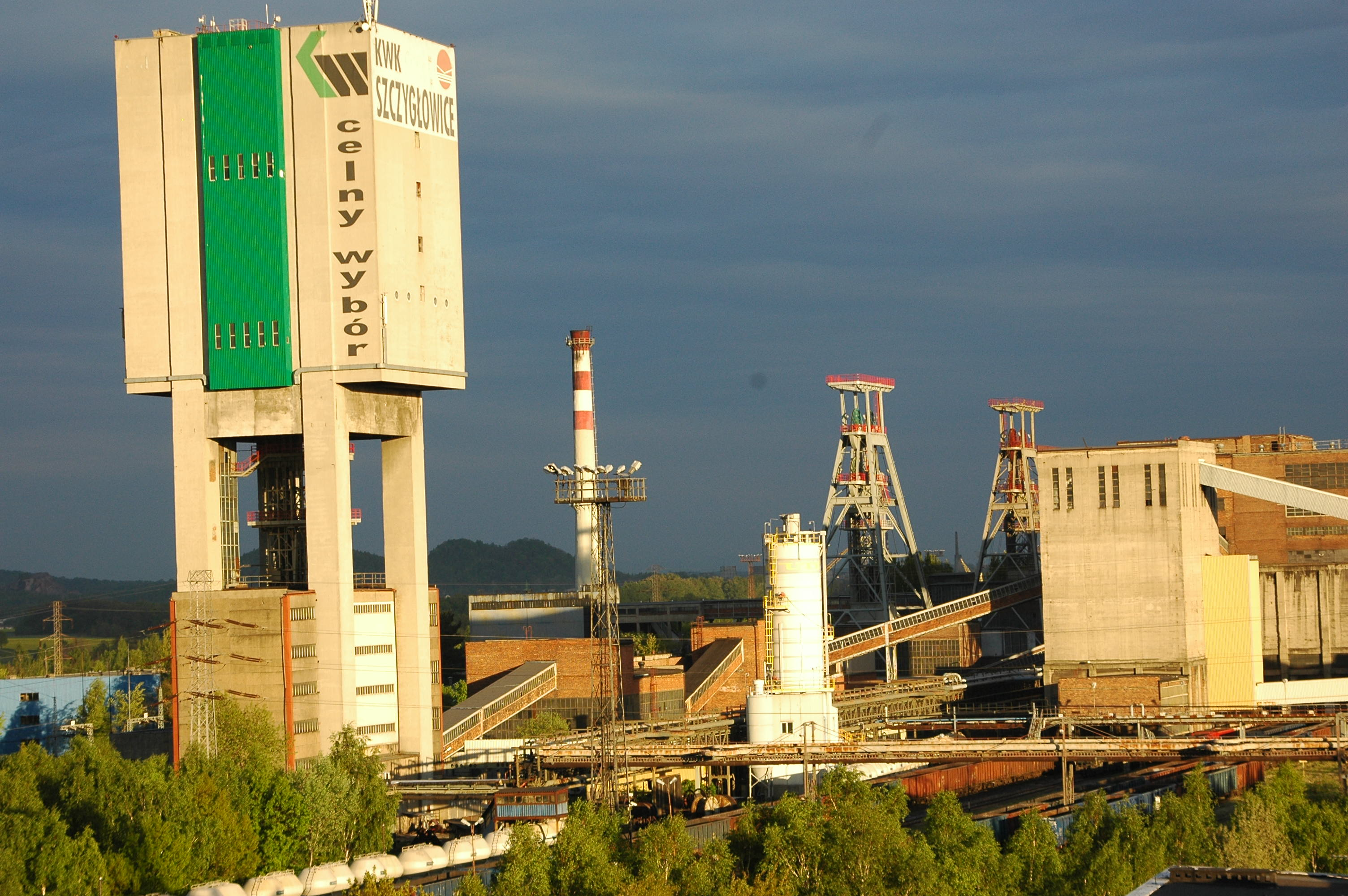

- Poland
- Location: Knurów, Silesian Voivodeship, Poland; 50°11′22″N 018°37′58″E
- Products: Coal
- Production: 3,800,000
- Opened: 1957
- Company: Jastrzębska Spółka Węglowa

The Szczygłowice coal mine is a large mine in the south of Poland in Szczygłowice, Silesian Voivodeship, 304 km south-west of the capital, Warsaw. Szczygłowice represents one of the largest coal reserve in Poland having estimated reserves of 300 million tonnes of coal. The annual coal production is around 3.8 million tonnes. On 31 July 2014, Jastrzębska Spółka Węglowa acquired the mine from Kompania Węglowa.
