= Knurów =

Knurów Knurōw (Silesian)
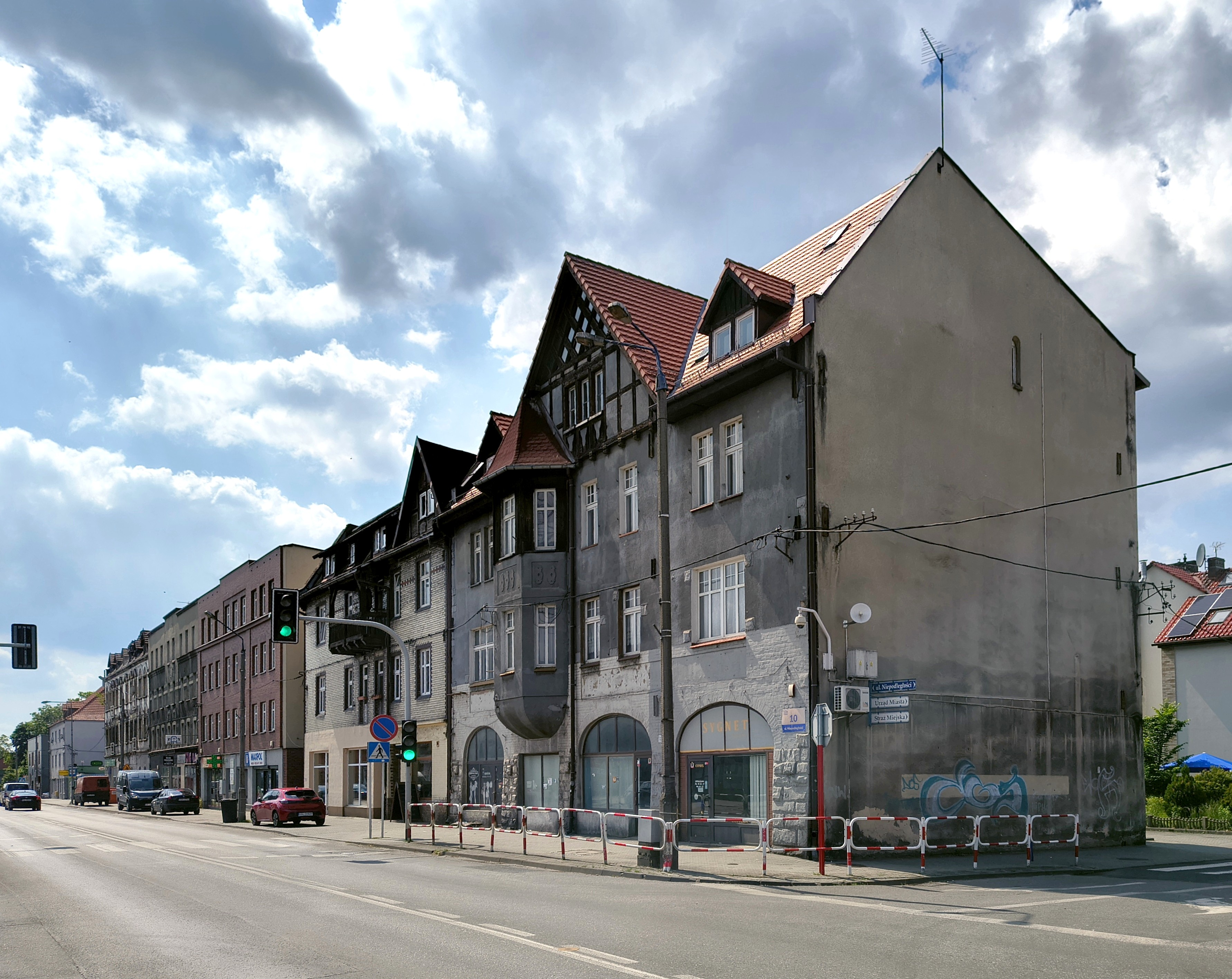
- Niepodległości Street in Knurów

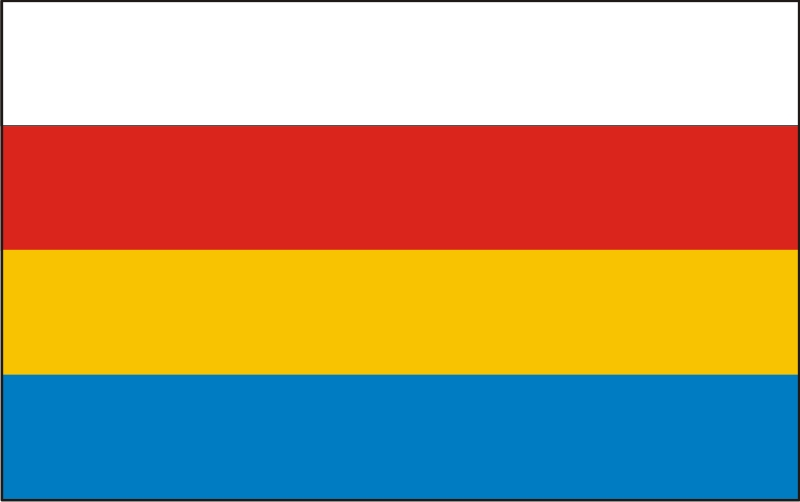
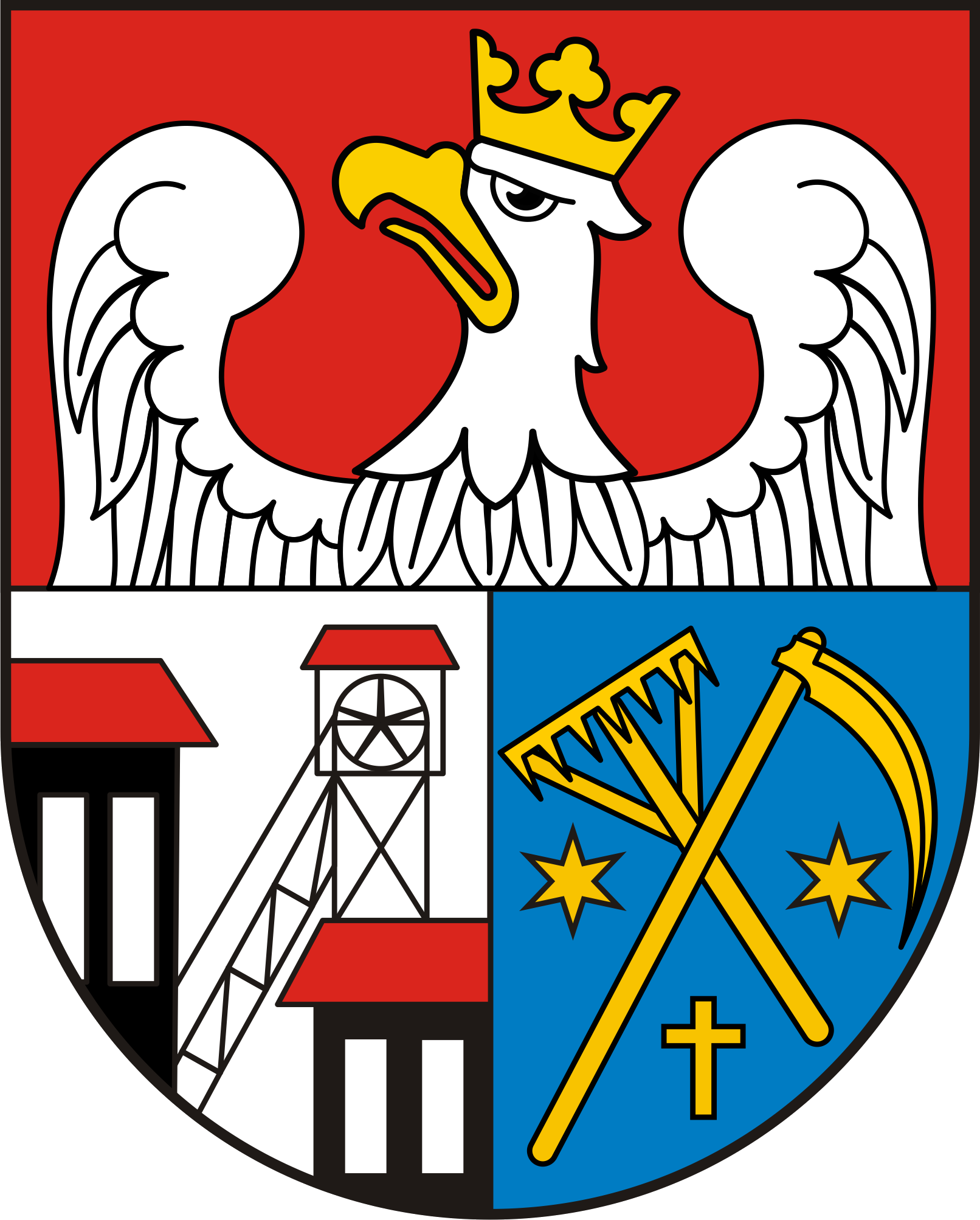
- Flag Coat of arms

- Location within Poland
- Coordinates: 50°13′N 18°41′E
- Country: Poland
- Voivodeship: Silesian
- County: Gliwice
- Gmina: Knurów (urban gmina)
- First mentioned: ca. 1295
- City rights: 1951

Government
  - City mayor: Tomasz Rzepa

Area
  - City: 33.95 km^{2} (13.11 sq mi)

Population (2019-06-30)
  - City: 38,310
  - Density: 1,128/km^{2} (2,923/sq mi)
  - Urban: 2,746,000
  - Metro: 5,294,000
- Time zone: UTC+1 (CET)
  - Summer (DST): UTC+2 (CEST)
- Postal code: 44-190 to 44-196
- Car plates: SGL
- Climate: Dfb
- Primary airport: Katowice Airport
- Website: http://www.knurow.pl/

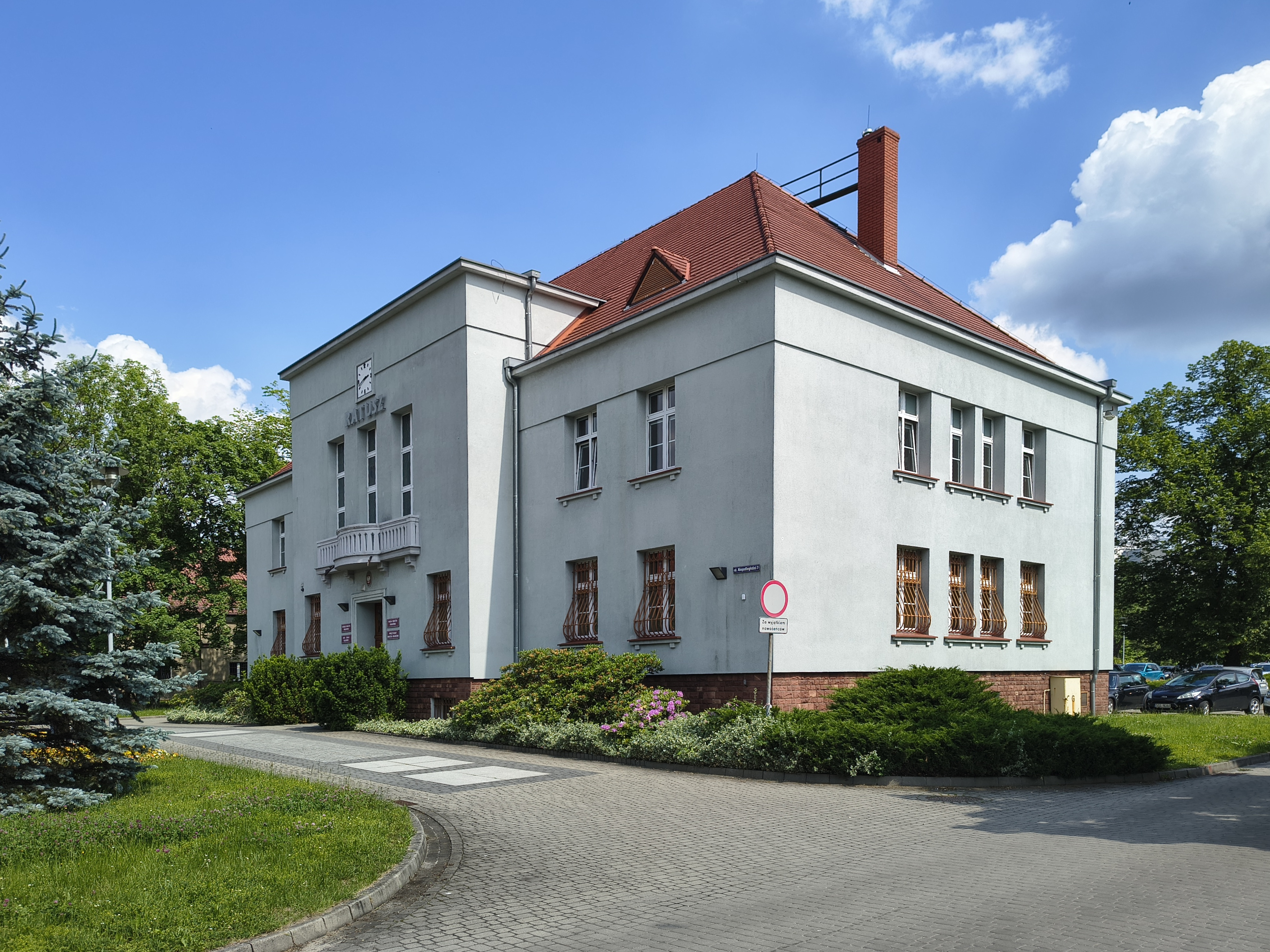
Knurów city hall

Knurów ([ˈknuruf]; Silesian: Knurōw, German: Knurow) is a city near Katowice in Silesia, southern Poland. Knurów is an outer city of the Metropolis GZM, a metropolis with a population of two million.

Knurów is located in the Silesian Highlands, on the Bierawka River, a tributary of the Oder River.

== History ==
Knurów's history as a city is relatively short, as it only became a town in 1951, when also the settlements of Krywałd and Szczygłowice were included within its town limits as districts. However, Knurów's existence can be traced back as far back as ca. 1295–1305, when it was mentioned in the Liber fundationis episcopatus Vratislaviensis chronicle, and was part of Piast-ruled Poland. It was then mentioned as Knauersdorf or Cnurowicz, and later on mostly appeared in documents under its current name. Later on, it was also part of Bohemia (Czechia), Prussia and Germany.

Throughout centuries, Knurów was a private village, and among its owners were the Goszycki, Węgierski and Paczyński families. The town rapidly grew at the end of the 18th century as the Industrial Revolution came and vast coal reserves were found in the Upper Silesian Coal Basin. In the late 19th century, the settlement had a population of 776. In 1904, the first mine shaft was opened, and in 1908-1909 a railway line connecting Knurów with Rybnik was built. In 1912, the first strike took place at the local mine.

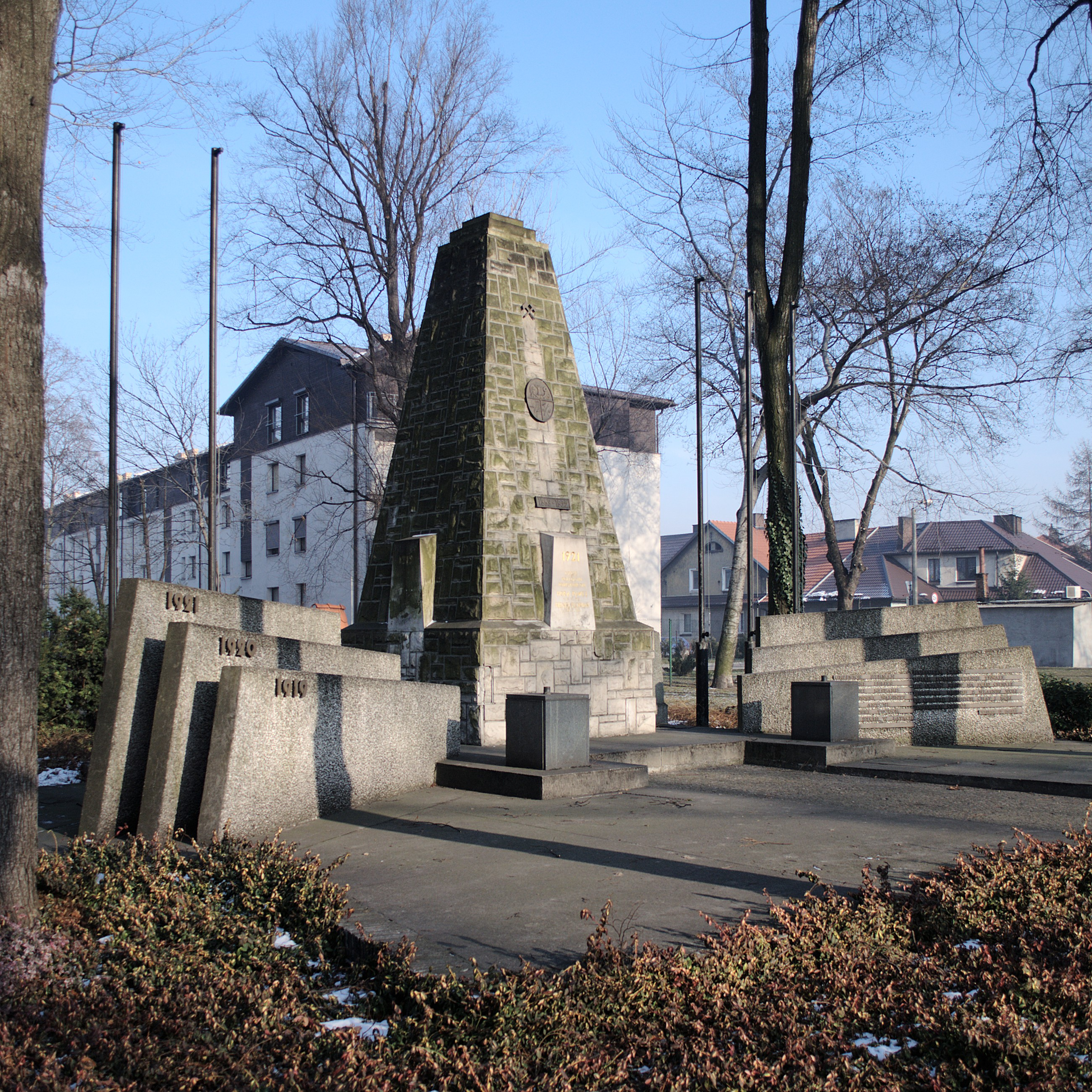
Silesian Uprisings Monument

After World War I, in 1918, Poland regained independence. Following a series of Polish Silesian Uprisings, and following the 1921 Upper Silesia plebiscite according to Versailles treaty, Knurów became again part of Poland. In the interwar period, Knurów developed intensively. New schools, stadiums, a pipeline connecting with Bełk and the first synthetic ammonia plant in Poland were built. On 26 July 1921, workers in Krywałd tried to dislodge 30 tonnes of ammonium nitrate that had aggregated (solidified into one mass) in two wagons. When mining explosives were used on this solid mass the wagons exploded and killed nineteen people, one of the first ammonium nitrate disasters. In 1923, a monument to the participants of the Silesian Uprisings was unveiled. The coal industry continued growing well in the 20th century, and doubled its output with a new mine being built in 1961 in Szczygłowice.

Knurów and the present-day districts of Krywałd and Szczygłowice were invaded by Germany on September 1, 1939, the first day of the invasion of Poland and World War II. Already in early September 1939, German troops committed a massacre of four Poles in Szczygłowice (see Nazi crimes against the Polish nation). During the subsequent German occupation, the occupiers established and operated two forced labour subcamps (E75, E758) of the Stalag VIII-B/344 prisoner-of-war camp in the town. A unit of the Home Army, the leading Polish resistance organization, was founded in Knurów in 1942. In January 1945, it was captured by the Soviets, who established a transit camp for local Polish Silesians who were deported to the Soviet Union (see Soviet repressions of Polish citizens (1939–1946)). Knurów was restored to Poland, although with a Soviet-installed communist regime, which then stayed in power until the Fall of Communism in the 1980s.

In 1951, Knurów was granted town rights. Several new schools were opened between 1964 and 1991, and new Catholic parishes were established in 1977–1983. More recently, in May 2015, riots ensued in the town after a Concordia Knurów fan was shot dead by police during a football match.

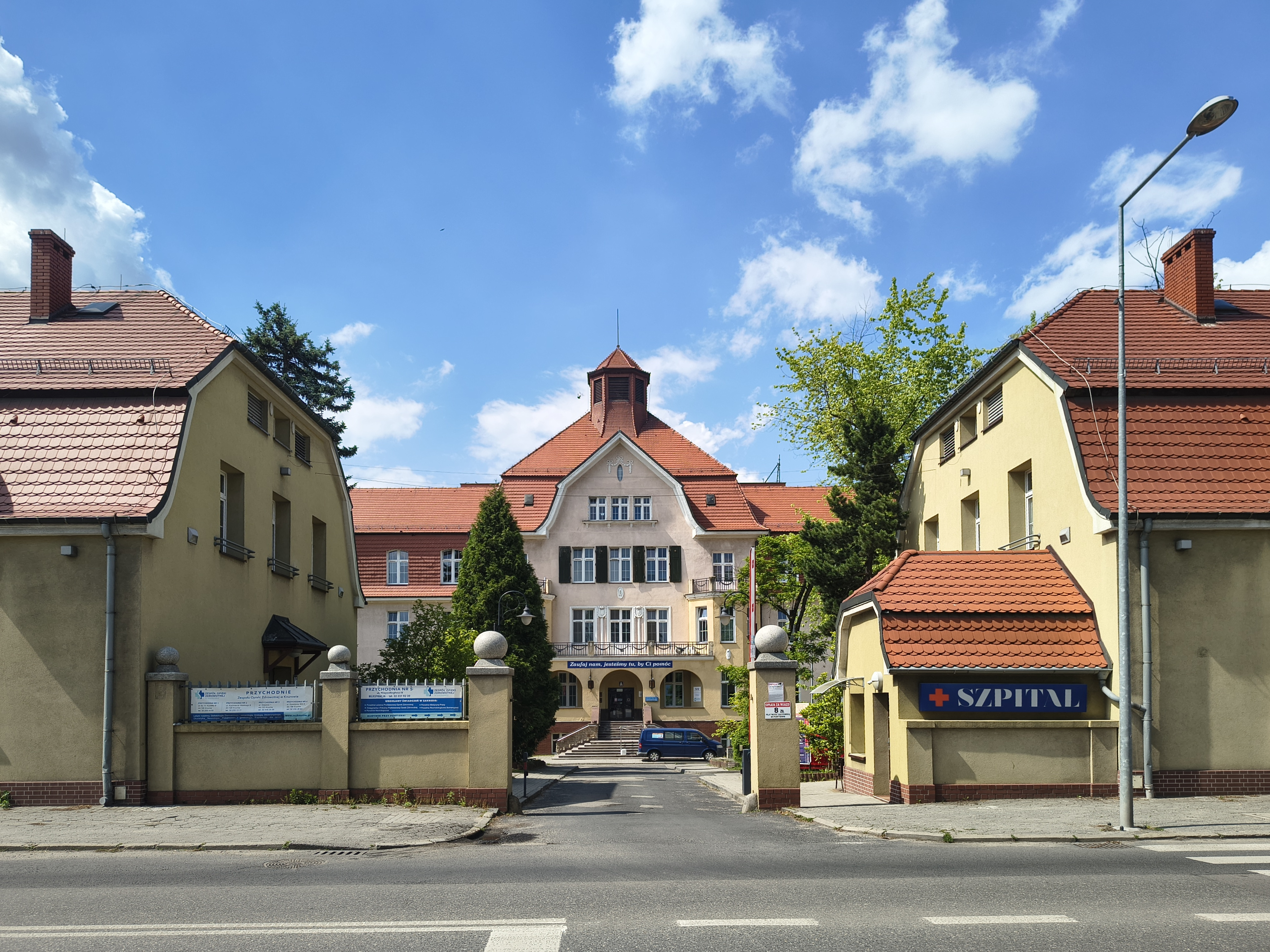
Hospital in Knurów

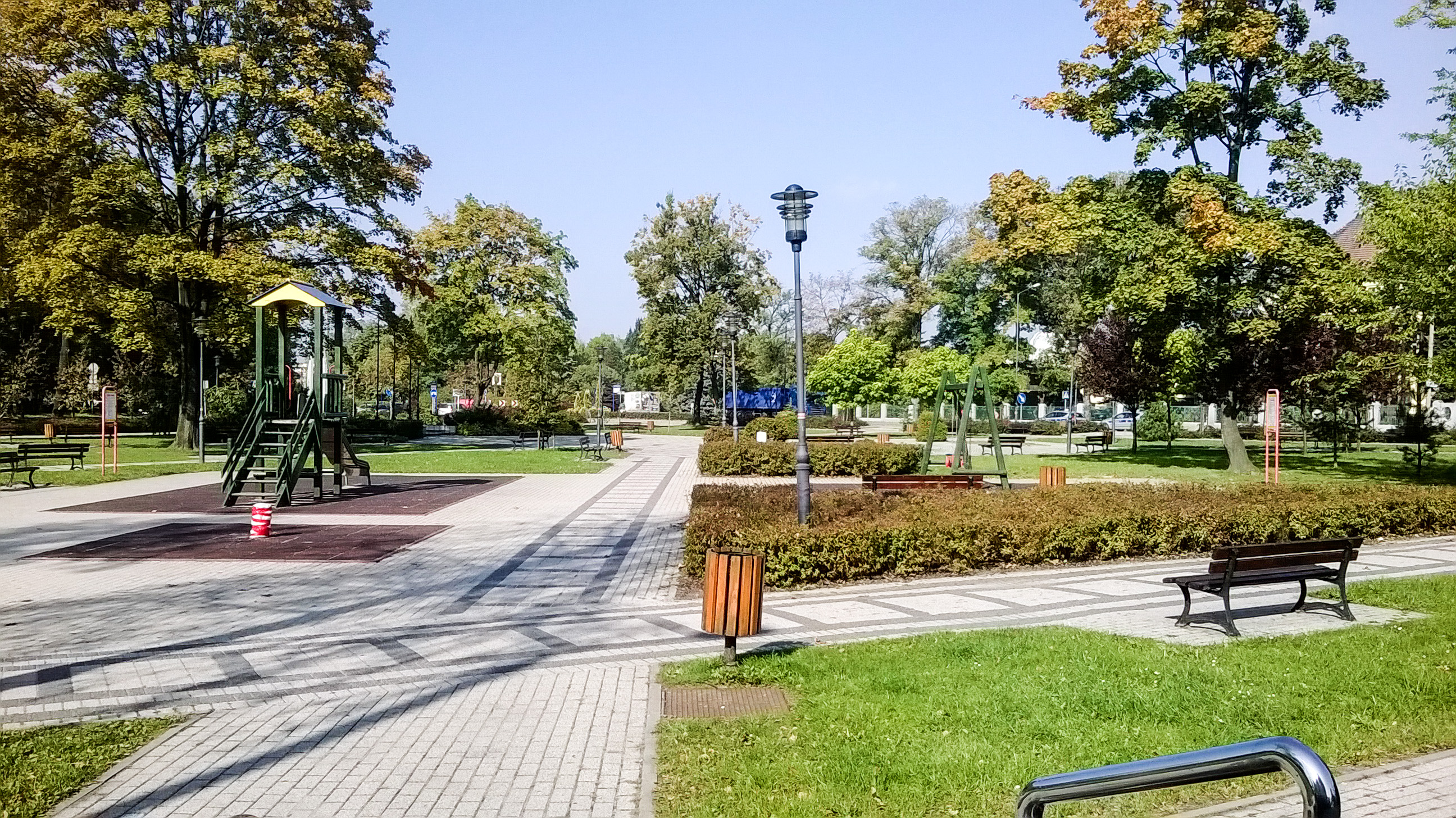
Park in Knurów

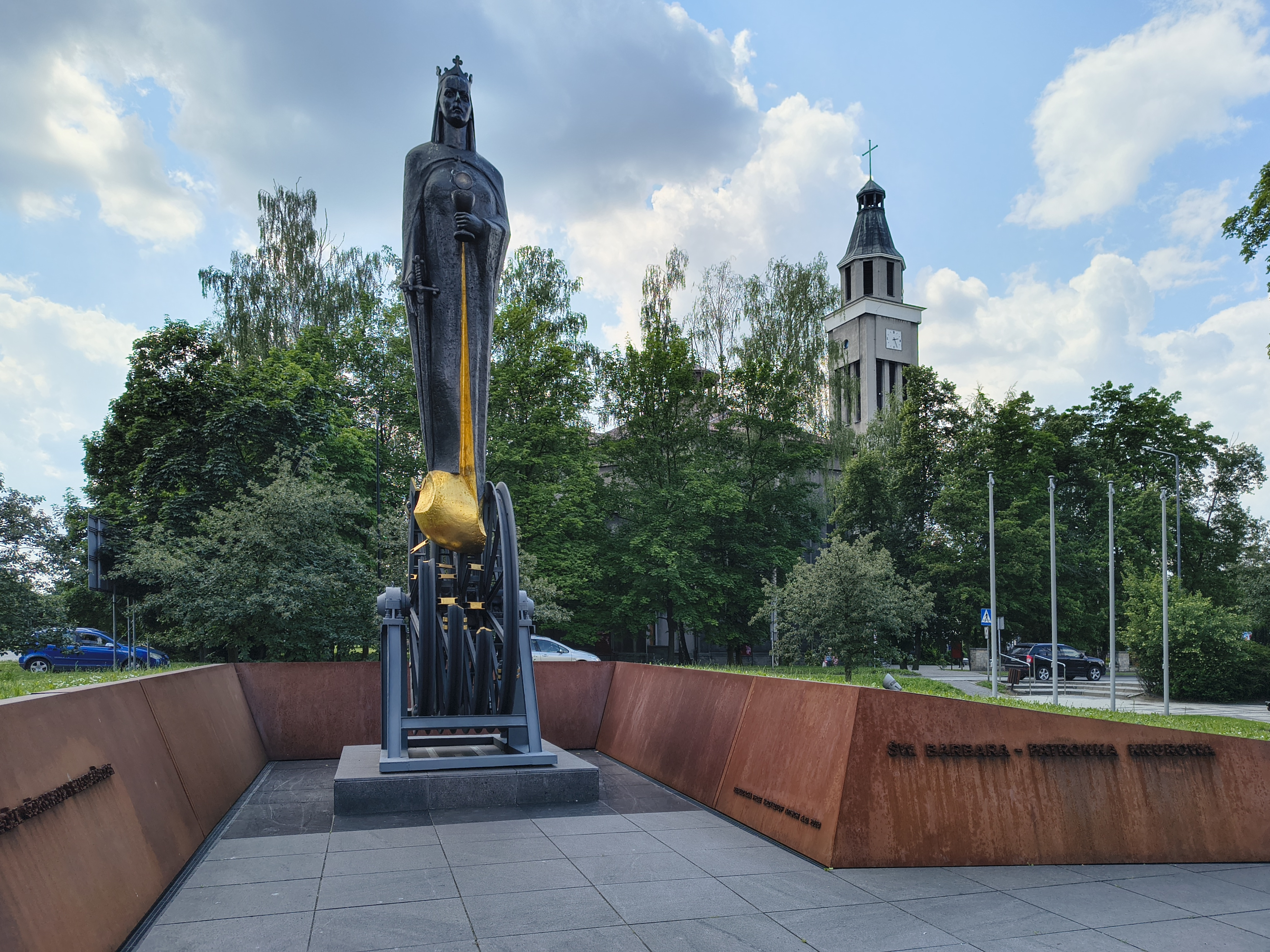
Statue of St. Barbara

== Population ==
Knurów is one of the cities of the 2.7 million conurbation – Katowice urban area and within a greater Katowice-Ostrava metropolitan area populated by about 5,294,000 people. The population of the town is 38,310 (2019).

== Politics ==
Administratively Knurów has been part of the Silesian Voivodeship since the latter's formation in 1999; previously it was part of Katowice Voivodeship.

== Economy ==
The town is usually associated with coal mining, as it lies in the Upper Silesian Coal Basin. The coal mine was established in 1903 in Knurów on the initiative of Gustav von Velsen, who was a ministerial director at the Department of Mining in Berlin. In 2019, the mine was connected to the Szczygłowice Coal Mine.

== Sport ==
The town is home to Concordia Knurów, a lower league football club which was founded in 1923, and famously where Jerzy Dudek started his career.

The route of the 2016 Tour de Pologne cycling race ran through the town.

== Notable residents ==
- Szczepan Twardoch (born 1979), writer

== Twin towns – sister cities ==
Knurów is twinned with:

- Kazincbarcika, Hungary
- Svit, Slovakia
