= Rafał Kołsut =

Polish voice actor (1990–2025)

- Born: 25 May 1990; Kozienice, Poland
- Died: 4 December 2025 (aged 35)
- Education: Jagiellonian University

Rafał Kołsut (25 May 1990 – 4 December 2025) was a Polish voice actor.

== Life and career ==
Kolsut was born in Kozienice on 25 May 1990. He made his debut on TVP1 in 1998 as a child actor in the program Ziarno. In 2002, he started working as a voice actor at the Polish Radio Theatre. In 2006, he starred in the film adaptation of Kornel Makuszyński's novel Satan from the Seventh Grade.

In 2014, he received a master's degree in theatre studies at the Jagiellonian University in Krakow, and in 2019, he received a PhD in humanities in the discipline of Literary Studies at the Faculty of Polish Studies.

Since 2008, he had been creating comic book scripts, notably being a co-creator of the comic book series "Man without a Neck".

As a reviewer and publicist in the years 2012–2021, he published in the "Magazynie Miłośników Komiksu KZ".

He was also the organizer of the annual Krakow Comic Book Festival.

Kołsut died from a suspected suicide on 4 December 2025, at the age of 35.
