= Agnieszka Maciąg =

Polish model, writer and actress (1969–2025)

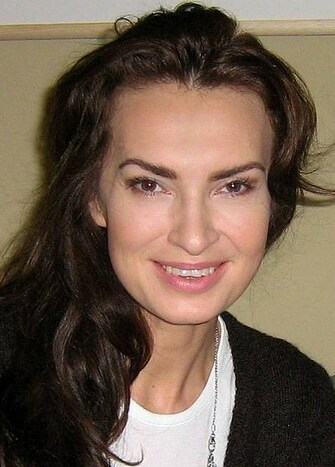
- Maciąg in 2007
- Born: Agnieszka Kozak; 9 May 1969; Białystok, Poland
- Died: 27 November 2025 (aged 56); Warsaw, Poland
- Occupations: Model, writer, blogger, actress, journalist
- Years active: 1989–2025

Agnieszka Maciąg-Wolańska (née Kozak; 9 May 1969 – 27 November 2025) was a Polish model, writer, blogger, actress and journalist.

== Life and career ==
Maciąg was a renowned model who was the author of self-help books.

From her relationship with Paweł Maciąg, the son of actress Barbara Wrzesińska, she had a son, Michał (born 1992). From 1996, she was in a relationship with photographer Robert Wolański, whom she married in 2011. She had a daughter from her second marriage.

On 27 November 2025, she died at the age of 56, after a battle with cancer.

== Filmography ==
- 2005: Czas surferów
- 2008: Niania
- 2012: Na dobre i na złe

== Publications ==
- Tomik poezji Zielone pantofle, Wydawnictwo Otwarte, Kraków 2006, ISBN 83-7515-004-5.
- Smak życia, Wydawnictwo Otwarte, Kraków 2007, ISBN 978-83-7515-027-8; wydanie 2: Kraków 2017, ISBN 978-83-7515-472-6.
- Smak szczęścia, Wydawnictwo Otwarte, Kraków 2011, ISBN 978-83-7515-184-8; wydanie 2 zmienione: Kraków 2015, ISBN 978-83-7515-383-5.
- Smak miłości, Wydawnictwo Otwarte, Kraków 2014, ISBN 978-83-7515-289-0.
- Smak świąt, Wydawnictwo Otwarte, Kraków 2015, ISBN 978-83-7515-325-5.
- Pełnia życia, Wydawnictwo Otwarte, Kraków 2016, oprawa twarda: ISBN 978-83-7515-269-2, oprawa broszurowa: ISBN 978-83-7515-265-4.
- Smak zdrowia, Wydawnictwo Otwarte, Kraków 2017, ISBN 978-83-7515-358-3.
- Rozmaryn i róże. Podróż do samej siebie, Wydawnictwo Otwarte, Kraków 2018, oprawa twarda: ISBN 978-83-7515-532-7, oprawa broszurowa: ISBN 978-83-7515-513-6.
- Twój dobry rok, Wydawnictwo Otwarte, Kraków 2018, ISBN 978-83-7515-549-5.
- Miłość. Ścieżki do wolności, Wydawnictwo Otwarte, Kraków 2019, ISBN 978-83-7515-579-2.
- Słowa mocy. Sztuka tworzenia szczęśliwego życia, Wydawnictwo Otwarte, Kraków 2019, ISBN 978-83-8135-012-9.
- Smak wiecznej młodości. Jak zachować młodość i witalność w każdym wieku, Wydawnictwo Otwarte, Kraków 2020, ISBN 978-83-8135-052-5.
- Menopauza. Podróż do esencji kobiecości, Wydawnictwo Otwarte, Kraków 2020, ISBN 978-83-8135-039-6.
- Twoja wewnętrzna moc. Jak żyć dobrze w niespokojnych czasach, Wydawnictwo Otwarte, Kraków 2020, ISBN 978-83-8135-063-1.
- Dobrostan. O szczęśliwym, bogatym i spełnionym życiu, Wydawnictwo Otwarte, Kraków 2020, ISBN 978-83-8135-098-3.
- Dom pełen miłości. Przepisy na cztery pory roku, Wydawnictwo Otwarte, Kraków 2021, ISBN 978-83-8135-125-6.
- Ścieżki duszy. Astrologia dla zrozumienia siebie i swoich bliskich, Wydawnictwo Otwarte, Kraków 2022, ISBN 978-83-8135-170-6.
- Dziennik Radości, Wydawnictwo Otwarte, Kraków 2022, ISBN 978-83-8135-238-3.
