= Ludwik Zalewski =

Polish politician (1954–2025)

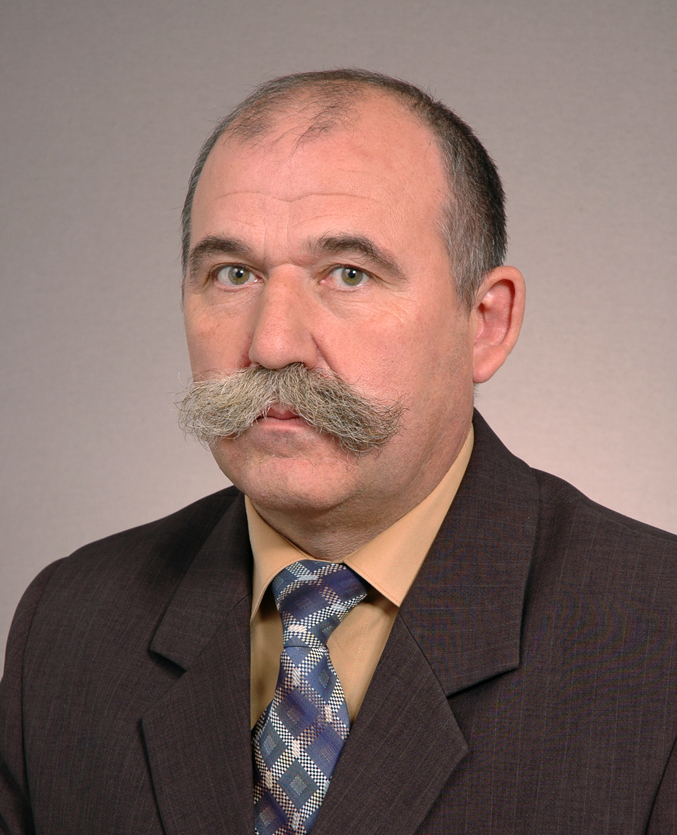
- Zalewski in 2005

Member of the Senate of Poland for Białystok
- In office 19 October 2005 – 4 November 2007

Personal details
- Born: 20 April 1954; Grądy, Poland
- Died: 6 January 2025 (aged 70); Łomża, Poland
- Political party: LPR
- Education: Military University of Technology
- Occupation: Military officer

Ludwik Zalewski (20 April 1954 – 6 January 2025) was a Polish politician. A member of the League of Polish Families, he served in the Senate from 2005 to 2007.

== Life and career ==
In 1974, he graduated from the Automotive Technical Secondary School in Olsztyn, then studied at the Faculty of Mechanical Engineering of the Military University of Technology in Warsaw.

In the years 1979–2003, he performed professional military service, among others, as the commander of the 1st Łomża Repair Battalion named after Col. Marian Raganowicz and the commander of the garrison in Łomża. After retirement, he was involved in business (he ran a sports shooting range) and tourist activities. He was the owner of the "Forty Piątnica" Museum.

In 2005, he was elected into the Senate of Poland for Białystok. In 2006, he ran unsuccessfully for the office of president of Łomża (he obtained 7.72% of support, i.e. 1,514 votes, taking 5th place). In 2007 he was not re-elected into the Senate. In the 2010 Polish local elections he ran unsuccessfully for the Podlaskie Voivodeship Sejmik from the Law and Justice list.

In 2003 he received the Silver Cross of Merit.

He was married and had three children.

Zalewski died in Łomża on 6 January 2025, at the age of 70.
