= Maria Dworzecka =

Polish-American computational nuclear physicist and physics educator (1941–2023)

- Born: Marysia Rozenszajn; June 19, 1941; Belastok, Byelorussian SSR, USSR
- Died: January 16, 2023 (aged 81); Fairfax, Virginia, U.S.
- Education: University of Warsaw
- Scientific career
- Fields: Physics
- Workplaces: Michigan State University (1970–1972); University of Massachusetts Amherst (1972–1974); University of Maryland, College Park (1974–1982); George Mason University (1982–2010s)

Maria Dworzecka, originally Marysia Rozenszajn (June 19, 1941 – January 16, 2023) was a Polish-American computational nuclear physicist and physics educator, and a survivor of the Białystok Ghetto. Topics in her research have included the Hartree–Fock method, heavy-ion collisions, and the dissipation of nuclear energy; she has also been recognized for her involvement in the development of educational software for physics simulations. She was a professor emerita in the Physics & Astronomy Department at George Mason University. Maria died on January 16, 2023, in Fairfax, Virginia. She was 81 years old.

== Early life ==
Marysia Rozenszajn was born on June 19, 1941, in Białystok, at that time part of Soviet-occupied Poland; her parents Izak (Włodek) Rozenszajn and Bela Kaufman Rozenszajn were from Warsaw, but had moved to Białystok to escape the Nazis. Her father died four days after her birth, from the initial bombings of the Battle of Białystok–Minsk. After this battle, Nazi Germany took over eastern Poland and set up the Białystok Ghetto to confine the Jews of Białystok, including Rozenszajn and her mother.

In 1943, Rozenszajn's mother Bela obtained documents identifying her as being Catholic Polish, named Paulina Pakulska, which she used to escape Białystok with her daughter and begin working as a maid in Tykocin. However, in late 1943 or early 1944, Bela was arrested as a partisan, leaving Rozenszajn abandoned on the streets of Tykocin. She was found and taken care of by Lucyna and Wacław Białowarczuk, who had no children and raised her as their own, covering her dark hair in public, and bringing her to pray with them at the Catholic church.

Tykocin returned to Soviet control in the Belostok Offensive of July 1944. Rozenszajn continued to live with the Bialowarczuks until in 1946 being reunited with her mother Bela, who had survived the Ravensbrück concentration camp and lived for a year as a refugee in Sweden. After spending several months becoming reacquainted with each other and living with the Białowarczuks, Maria and Bela Rozenszajn returned to Warsaw, but remained in contact with the Białowarczuks, who were named Righteous Among the Nations for risking their lives to save Rozenszajn.

In 1948, Bela Rozenszajn died in an automobile accident. After briefly living with an uncle, Maria was adopted by Alicja Dworzecka and Arkadiusz Dworzecki, who were Polish Jews. It was from this adoption that she obtained the surname Dworzecka that she would use in her professional career as a physicist.

== Education and career ==
Dworzecka was educated in physics in Poland, also traveling to India to study in 1967, but being recalled to Poland after the outbreak of the Six-Day War. She earned a master's degree in physics in 1964 and completed her Ph.D. in 1969, both at the University of Warsaw, where she became a junior faculty member in 1964. Meanwhile, anti-semitic violence had again flared up in Poland, triggered by the 1968 Polish political crisis, and she was asked to leave Poland because of her Jewish identity. The Bialowarczuks offered to shelter Dworzecka and her adopted parents, but instead she chose to emigrate to the US, leaving Alicja Dworzecka and Arkadiusz Dworzecki in Poland. To do so, she traveled to Israel as a tourist, stopping in Vienna on her return trip, where she obtained a refugee visa to the US.

In the US, Dworzecka worked as a researcher at Michigan State University from 1970 to 1972 before obtaining a faculty position as an assistant professor of physics at the University of Massachusetts Amherst in 1972. She moved to the University of Maryland, College Park in 1974. Dworzecka became an associate professor of physics at George Mason University in 1982, and was promoted to full professor in 1987. She chaired the Physics & Astronomy Department from 1999 to 2006, and from 2006 to 2011 was Senior Associate Dean for Special Projects in the George Mason College of Science.

After Dworzecka retired from George Mason as a professor emerita, she served as a volunteer for the United States Holocaust Memorial Museum.

== Simulation software ==
In the 1990s, Dworzecka became one of the three directors of the Consortium for Upper-Level Physics Software, a multi-institution team of 30 physicists that developed physics simulation software for upper-division undergraduate physics instruction.

Dworzecka was the co-author of the book Modern Physics Simulations (John Wiley & Sons, 1995).

== Recognition ==
In 1996, Dworzecka was named a Fellow of the American Physical Society (APS), after a nomination from the APS Division of Computational Physics, "for co-directing the Consortium of Upper Level Physics Software (CUPS) and co-editing accompanying instructional material for upper level physics classes."
