= Witold Dąbrowski =

Polish politician (1932–2025)

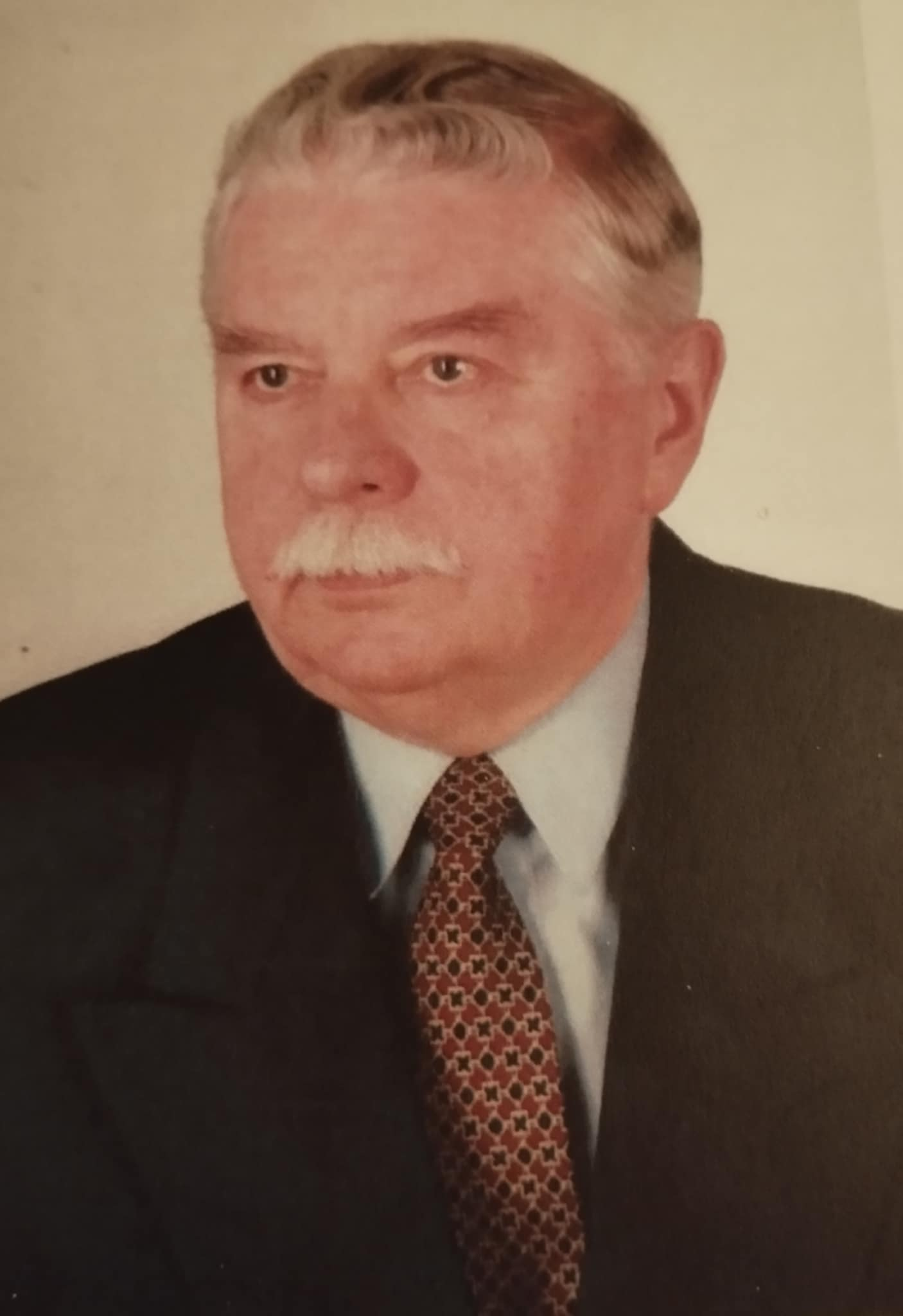

Voivode of Siedlce
- In office 1 June 1975 – February 1977
- Preceded by: position established
- Succeeded by: Zofia Grzebisz-Nowicka

Personal details
- Born: Witold Wojciech Dąbrowski; 5 June 1932 Warsaw, Poland
- Died: 12 January 2025 (aged 92)
- Party: PZPR
- Education: Wyższa Szkoła Nauk Społecznych
- Occupation: Economist

Witold Wojciech Dąbrowski (5 June 1932 – 12 January 2025) was a Polish politician. A member of the Polish United Workers' Party, he served as voivode of Siedlce from 1975 to 1977.

Dąbrowski died on 12 January 2025, at the age of 92.
