= Jerzy Sztwiertnia =

Polish director and screenwriter (1946–2025)

Jerzy Sztwiertnia

Jerzy Sztwiertnia (25 December 1946 – 27 July 2025) was a Polish film director and screenwriter.

== Life and career ==
Sztwiertnia was born on 25 December 1946 in Chorzów. He graduated from the Directing Department of the Film School in Łódź in 1969. He was co-owner of the "Fokus Film" production studio and a member of the Polish Film Academy.

Throughout his career he worked on a number of television shows and film, including The Clan, and Plebania.

== Death ==
Sztwiertnia died on 27 July 2025, at the age of 78.
