= Urszula Koszut =

- Born: Urszula Lucia Koszut; 13 December 1940; Pszczyna, Poland
- Died: 27 September 2023 (aged 82); Warsaw, Poland
- Occupation: Opera singer
- Children: 1

Urszula Lucia Koszut (13 December 1940 – 27 September 2023) was a Polish operatic soprano. She made her debut in 1966 and did so professionally the following year at the Stuttgart Opera in Germany until 1969. Koszut was a performer at the Hamburg State Opera and then at the Vienna State Opera from 1973 to 1979. She performed in the opera houses of Europe and North America and sang soprano parts in the oratorio-cantata repertoire of Johann Sebastian Bach, Wolfgang Amadeus Mozart and Johannes Brahms.

== Early life ==
Koszut was born on 13 December 1940 in the town of Pszczyna, Poland. Her father was from Hungary, and she had an older sister. After graduating from primary school, Koszut attended the music high school in Bielsko-Biała, studying the flute. Koszut studied at the State Higher School of Music in Katowice under the supervision of Irena Lewińska, then with Maria Eichler-Cholewa from 1964 to 1966 and Bogdan Ruśkiewicz.

== Career ==
In 1966, she made her debut as Musetta in Giacomo Puccini's La bohème at the Grand Theatre, Warsaw. The following year, Koszut traveled abroad and began her professional career performing the title role of Miss Lucia in Gaetano Donizetti's Lucia di Lammermoor at the Stuttgart Opera in Germany. She remained with the Stuttgart Opera until 1969, performing in Violetta in Giuseppe Verdi's La traviata, and three parts in Jacques Offenbach's The Tales of Hoffman. Koszut had her debut in the United States as Norina in Donizetti's Don Pasquale in New Orleans in 1969. From 1970 to 1973, she spent three years singing at the Hamburg State Opera. Koszut went on to sing The Queen of the Night in Wolfgang Amadeus Mozart's The Magic Flute at the Glyndebourne Festival Opera in 1970, Zerbinetta in Amsterdam, Oscar in Chicago in 1972, Mimì in Puccini's La bohème in Toronto in 1972 and Violetta for the Scottish Opera in 1973. She sung at the Vienna State Opera from 1973 to 1979. Koszut sang in Ludwig van Beethoven's Symphony No. 9 under the conductor Rudolf Kempe in 1974.

Her repertory included more soprano roles in the oratorio-cantata repertoire of Johann Sebastian Bach, Mozart, Johannes Brahms as Gilda, Aminta in Die schweigsame Frau, Despina in Mozart's Così fan tutte, Konstanze in Die Entführung aus dem Serail, in Konin der Nacht in The Magic Flute, Electra in Idomeneo, Konstanze and Countess Almaviva, which she sang at Covent Garden in 1982, Fiakermilli in Richard Strauss's Arabella and Zerbinetta in Ariadne auf Naxos, Marguerite in Charles Gounod's Faust, Mélisande in Claude Debussy's Pelléas et Mélisande, Solo in Carl Orff's Carmina Burana, Regina in Paul Hindemith's Mathis der Maler, Oscar in Verdi's Un ballo in maschera, Donna Elvira in Ernani, Nannetta in Falstaff, Gilda in Rigoletto, and Elena in I vespri siciliani. She was also Frau Fluth in Otto Nicolai's The Merry Wives of Windsor, Philippe in Krzysztof Penderecki's The Devils of Loudun and Imogene in Vincenzo Bellini's Il pirata. Koszut also performed the roles of the Countess de la Roche in Bernd Alois Zimmermann's Die Soldaten and the title role of Ferdinando Paer's Leonora. She also performed at the opera houses in Basel, Berlin, Chicago, Cologne, Geneva, Genoa, Houston, Lisbon, Munich, Ottawa, Paris, Portland, Rome, San Francisco, Venice.

She appeared in the world premieres such as in Mauricio Kagel's Staatstheater in 1971 and as Miss Price in Walter Steffens's Under Milk Wood in 1973. Some of Koszut's performances were recorded on radio and television recordings in Poland and Germany and recorded albums for such labels as Decca Records, Deutsche Grammophon and EMI. She taught voice and coached repertoire. Koszut specialised in German romantic lieder and the songs of Polish composers.

== Personal life ==
She was married twice. Koszut's second husband was the opera conductor Gerhard Geist. Koszut had a child in her first marriage to Andrzej Okruta. She died on 27 September 2023 in Warsaw after a lengthy illness. Koszut's funeral took place at the All Saints Church in Pszczyna on 13 October 2023.
