= Piotr Waśko =

Polish politician (1961–2023)

Member of the Sejm
- In office 5 November 2007 – 7 November 2011
- Constituency: Constituency No. 38

Personal details
- Born: Piotr Roman Waśko; 22 February 1961 Czarnków, Poland
- Died: 29 January 2023 (aged 61)
- Party: PO
- Education: Adam Mickiewicz University in Poznań

Piotr Roman Waśko (22 February 1961 – 29 January 2023) was a Polish politician. A member of the Civic Platform, he served in the Sejm from 2007 to 2011.

Waśko died on 29 January 2023 at the age of 61.
