= Wanda Półtawska =

Polish physician and author (1921–2023)

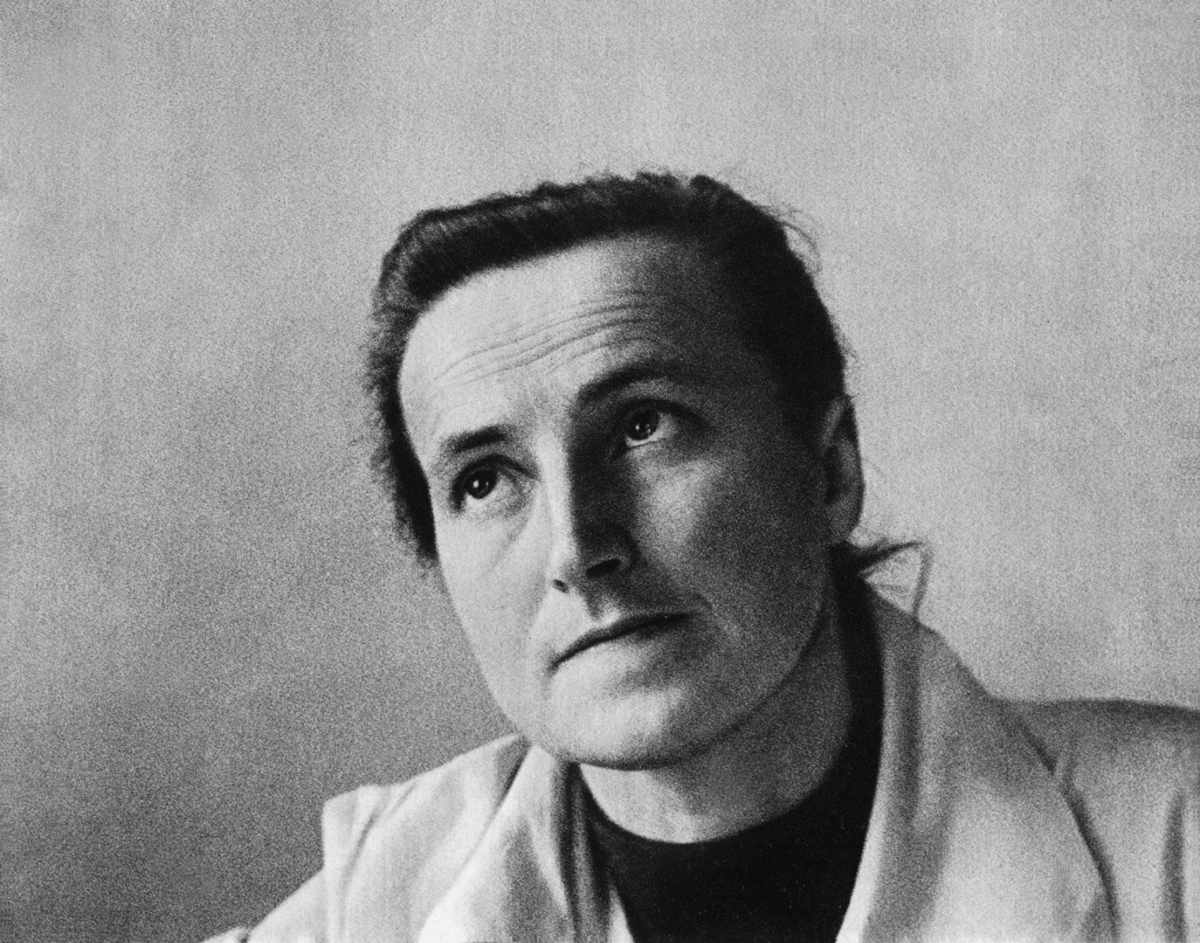
- Półtawska in 1963
- Born: Wanda Wiktoria Wojtasik; 2 November 1921; Lublin, Poland
- Died: 24 October 2023 (aged 101); Kraków, Poland
- Education: Jagiellonian University (Ph.D)
- Occupation: Physician
- Notable work: And I Am Afraid of My Dreams
- Spouse: Andrzej Półtawski (m. 1947; died 2020)
- Children: 4

Wanda Wiktoria Półtawska (pronounced [ˈvanda vikˈtɔrʲa puwˈtafska]; né Wojtasik [vɔjˈtaɕik], 2 November 1921 – 24 October 2023) was a Polish physician, author, Holocaust survivor and pro-life activist.

== Biography ==
Wanda Wiktoria Półtawska was born in Lublin, Poland on 2 November 1921. During World War II, she was interred at Ravensbrück concentration camp, just north of Berlin, having been arrested in February 1941 and charged with assisting the Polish resistance movement. She was used as a human guinea pig and became the subject of various medical experiments. She spent four years in the camp and afterwards wrote an account of her experiences, And I Am Afraid of My Dreams. In 1947 she married philosopher Andrzej Półtawski and had four children.

Her memoir of the life and conditions for the women held in the camp has provided material for other books such as Ravensbrück: The Cell Building by Insa Eschebach. She had decided during her incarceration that if she survived she would become a doctor. She completed her medical studies at the Jagiellonian University in 1951 and obtained her doctorate in psychiatry in 1964. She conducted research on the so-called "Auschwitz children", people who had endured the concentration camps as children. In 1967, she organized the establishment of the Institute of Family Theology at the Pontifical Academy of Theology in Kraków and managed it for 33 years. Between 1981 and 1984, she was a lecturer at the Pontifical Lateran University in Rome.

After her imprisonment, Półtawska developed a close friendship with Karol Wojtyła during his priesthood, and remained friends with him as Pope John Paul II until his death in 2005. In 2009, Półtawska published five decades of private correspondence with Pope John Paul II, to some controversy.

=== Religion and statement of faith ===
Półtawska was a staunch Roman Catholic, and collaborated with her compatriot Pope John Paul II, influencing him on such topics as contraception and sexuality. When, in 1962, Półtawska was ill with cancer and told she had only 18 months to live, the monk Padre Pio was asked by the future Pope, then Bishop Wojtyła, to pray for Półtawska. After this, her cancerous growth allegedly disappeared and she no longer needed an operation to remove it. This was one of the miracles that led the Pope to canonise Padre Pio in 2002.

Półtawska authored a document titled the Declaration of faith of catholic physicians and medicine students with respect to human sexuality and reproduction which is a statement of faith and dogma, and among other things condemns abortion, contraception, artificial insemination, and euthanasia. The document was signed by close to 4,000 people including physicians, nurses, medicine students, and became the subject of heated political and media debate on the influence of religion on medical practice.

=== Death ===
Wanda Półtawska died in Kraków on 24 October 2023, shortly before her 102nd birthday.
