= Wojciech Dziembowski =

Polish astronomer (1940–2025)

Wojciech Andrzej Dziembowski
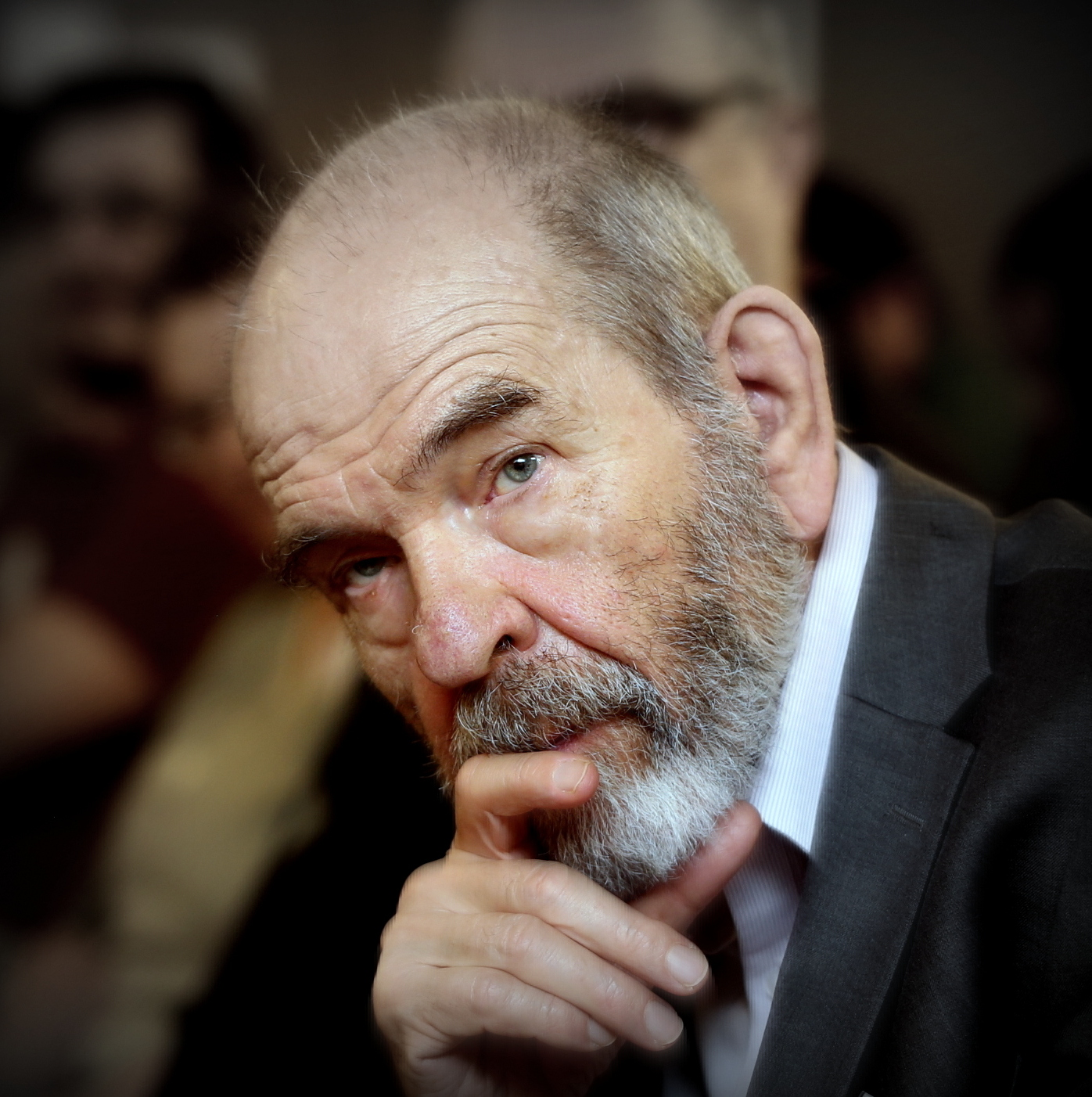
- Dziembowski in 2015
- Born: 14 January 1940; Warsaw, Poland
- Died: 10 February 2025 (aged 85)
- Education: Jagiellonian University, Columbia University, University of Warsaw (Ph.D. 1967), Polish Academy of Sciences
- Awards: Award of the 3rd Department of Mathematic, Physics and Chemistry PAN (1978), Medaille de l’Adion of the Nice Observatory (2000), Golden Medal of the University of Wrocław (2005), Bohdan Paczyński Medal (2019)
- Scientific career
- Fields: Astronomy

Wojciech Andrzej Dziembowski (14 January 1940 – 10 February 2025) was a Polish astronomer who was a member of Polish Academy of Sciences and Polish Academy of Learning.

== Life and career ==
Dziembowski studied at the Jagiellonian University and in 1967 he defended his PhD thesis at the University of Warsaw. He received his professor's degree in 1983. Since 1989 he has been a corresponding member of Polish Academy of Sciences (PAN) and since 2007 he has been a full member of the organization.

Between 1967 and 1969 he was a fellow at the Columbia University in New York. In 1969 he began working for the CAMK of PAN in Warsaw, Poland, where from 1987 to 1992 he served as director. In 1997 he also became a professor of the Astronomical Observatory at the University of Warsaw.

Dziembowski died on 10 February 2025, at the age of 85.

== Publications ==
Dziembowski authored 138 publications in academic magazines that have been reviewed and quoted 7449 times (as of January 2016).

Significant works:

- Oscillations of giants and supergiants, 1977
- Nonlinear mode coupling in oscillating stars, 1982
- The radial gradient in the Sun's rotation, 1989
- Solar model from helioseismology and the neutrino flux problem, 1990
- The opacity mechanism in B-type stars, 1993
- Oscillations of α UMa and other red giants, 2001
- Asteroseismology of the β Cephei star ν Eridani, 2004

== Awards ==
- Award of the 3rd Department of Mathematics, Physics and Chemistry PAN (1978)
- Medaille de l’Adion of the Nice Observatory (2000)
- Golden Medal of the University of Wrocław (2005)
- Bohdan Paczyński Medal of the Polish Astronomical Society (2019)
