= Sylwester Wilczek =

Polish ice hockey player and coach

- Born: December 10, 1936; Katowice, Poland
- Height: 5 ft 8 in (173 cm)
- Weight: 165 lb (75 kg; 11 st 11 lb)
- Position: Centre
- Played for: Gwardia Katowice; Górnik Katowice
- National team: Poland
- Playing career: 1951–1970

Sylwester Wilczek (10 December 1936 — 3 May 2025) was a Polish ice hockey player and coach. He played for Gwardia Katowice and Górnik Katowice during his career. He also played for the Polish national team at the 1964 Winter Olympics and several World Championships. After his playing career he turned to coaching, and including two years as head coach of GKS Katowice, as Górnik had been renamed.

He died on 3 May 2025.
