= Barbara Rybałtowska =

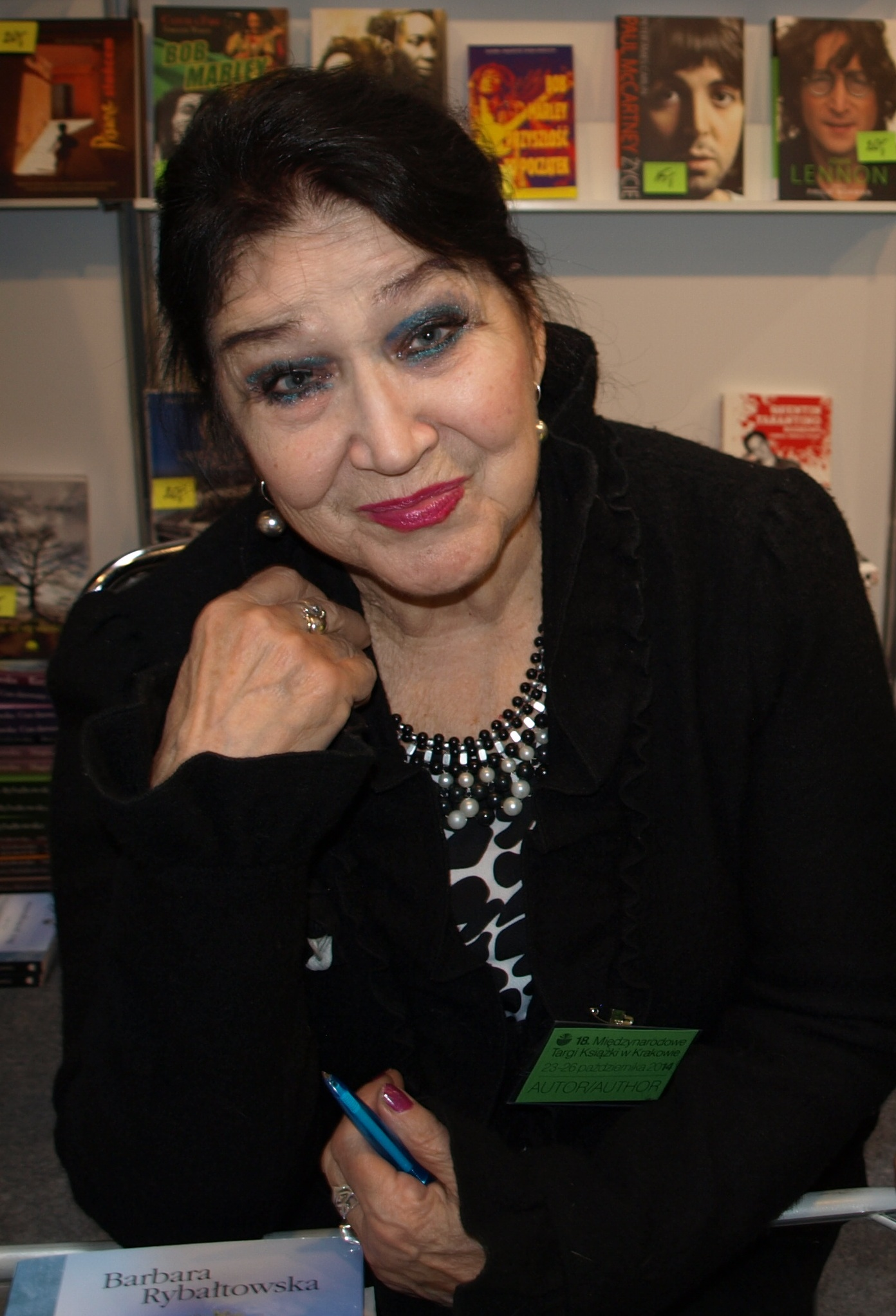
- Barbara Rybałtowska in 2014
- Born: 9 October 1936
- Died: 14 February 2025 (aged 88)
- Occupations: Writer, singer
- Years active: 1974–2025

Barbara Rybałtowska-Szelichowska (born 9 October 1936 – 14 February 2025) was a Polish writer, singer, songwriter, actress and painter.

== Biography ==
As a child, she was deported to Siberia with her mother. Memories from this period inspired the creation of the Saga cycle. Among the songs she wrote, the most famous is "Nie warto było" (It Wasn't Worth It), from Regina Pisarek's repertoire . She wrote theatrical plays : "Prague at Pola Negri" (a monodrama with songs by Pola Negri) and "Fantazja Rybałtowska" (a play referring to the old Polish tradition of the Rybałt family).

== Works ==
Saga

- Bez pożegnania
- Szkoła pod baobabem
- Koło graniaste
- Mea Culpa
- Czas darowany nam
- Jak to się skończy
- Co to za czasy
- Co tu po nas zostanie

Other novels

- Kuszenie losu
- Magia przeznaczenia
- Przypadek sprawił
- Romanse w Paryżu

Biographies

- Barbara Brylska w najtrudniejszej roli
- Barbara Wrzesińska przed sądem
- Iga Cembrzyńska i Andrzej Kondratiuk – sama i w duecie
- Irena Jarocka
