= Andrzej Fiedor =

Polish biathlete (1946–2025)

Personal information
- Nationality: Polish
- Born: 2 January 1946 Koniówka, Poland
- Died: 24 April 2025 Homer Glen, Illinois

Sport
- Sport: Biathlon

Andrzej Fiedor (2 January 1946 – 24 April 2025) was a Polish biathlete. He competed at the 1968 Winter Olympics and the 1972 Winter Olympics.
