= Szczygłowice =

- Dzielnica
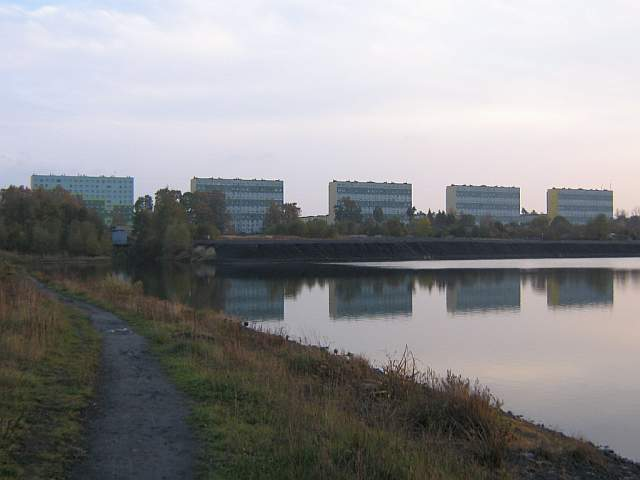
- Interactive map of Szczygłowice
- Country: Poland
- Voivodeship: Silesian
- Conurbation: Upper Silesian–Dąbrowa Basin
- City: Knurów
- Postal code: 44-193
- SIMC: 0940878

Szczygłowice is a dzielnica of Knurów within the wider Upper Silesian–Dąbrowa Basin Metropolis in Silesian Voivodeship, Poland.

== Etymology ==
As part of the Kingdom of Prussia in 1830, the settlement's name was recorded as Sczyglowice, or Scziglowitz in German. Writing in the later nineteenth century, the Silesian geographer Heinrich Adamy recorded its name as Scyglowitz, the German form of Scyglowice, which he proposed was derived from the Slavic word szczygieł (goldfinch).
