= Marek Trojanowicz =

Polish chemist (1944–2025)

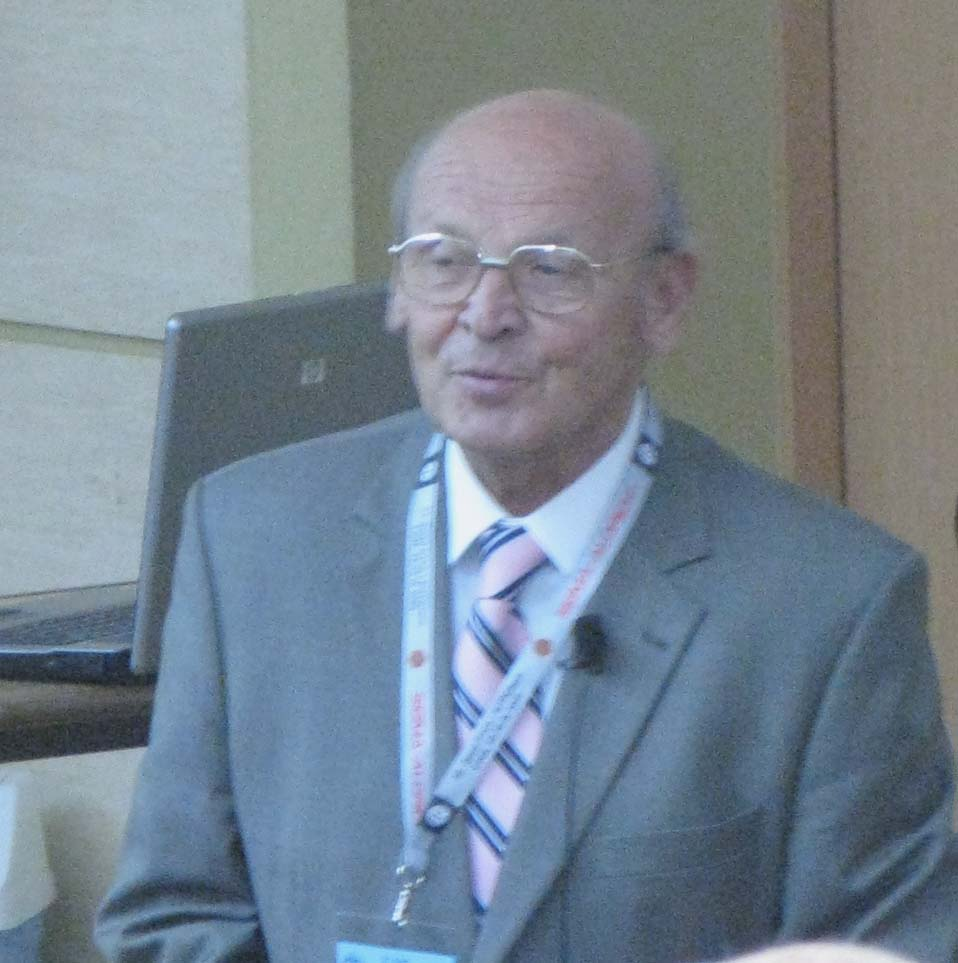
Trojanowicz in 2009

Marek Andrzej Trojanowicz (April 30, 1944 – June 10, 2025) was a Polish chemist, professor of chemical sciences with specialisation in analytical chemistry, academic staff member and head of the Laboratory for Flow Analysis and Chromatography, University of Warsaw, Poland.

== Background ==
Trojanowicz completed his master studies in 1966 in the Faculty of Chemistry, University of Warsaw. In 1974, in the same Faculty he was granted a PhD degree under the supervision of Prof. Adam Hulanicki in the field of analytical chemistry presenting the thesis on theory of titrations with potentiometric detection. In 1981, he was granted D.Sc. degree (habilitation) based on a dissertation on membrane ion-selective electrodes and their application in water analysis. He had a post-doc one-year stay in Tohoku University in Sendai, Japan, in the research group of Prof. Nobuyuki Tanaka. In 1991, he was nominated a titular professor of chemical sciences. Since 1992, he was full professor in the Faculty of Chemistry, University of Warsaw. He was a visiting professor at 20 universities and research institutes all over the world, including Japan, France, United Kingdom, Italy, Brazil, Australia and USA. Since 1966, he became employed as academic staff member in the Faculty of Chemistry, University of Warsaw, and since 1992 simultaneously in the Institute of Nuclear Chemistry and Technology in Warsaw.

He was a member of Advisory Editorial Boards of several international journals, including Journal of Biochemical and Biophysical Methods and Talanta (Elsevier), Analytical Letters (Taylor and Francis), Microchimica Acta (Springer) and Journal of Flow Injection Analysis (Japan Association of Flow Injection Analysis). In 1992–2003, he was Scientific Secretary of the Committee on Analytical Chemistry, of the Polish Academy of Sciences. He was a member of the Warsaw Scientific Society, and the Polish Chemical Society, the International Electrochemical Society, and the Society of Environmental Toxicology and Chemistry.

Trojanowicz died on June 10, 2025, at the age of 81.

== Scientific interests ==
Trojanowicz published 320 scientific publications (250 in peer-reviewed journals according to ISI Web of Knowledge, January 2013). In 1988, in the journal of the Royal Society of Chemistry The Analyst he presented the development of enzymatic electrochemical biosensor, where for the first time it was shown that enzyme immobilized in hydrophobic graphite paste maintain the biocatalytic activity. In 1989, he published together with Mark E. Meyerhoff in the journal Analytical Chemistry a paper on novel electrochemical detection in ion-chromatography, which was based on exchange of ions through tubular membranes and measuring the change of potential of the indicator electrode. In 2001, in Journal of Chromatography, he published with his research team a work on simultaneous analytical determination of optical isomers of several neurotransmitters in physiological fluids using capillary electrophoresis, including determination of all diastereoisomers of ephedrine. He was also granted 6 patents in Poland, Finland, European Union and USA.

== Awards and honours ==
For his scientific activity he was granted several Polish and foreign awards, including Wiktor Kemula Medal of the Polish Chemical Society (2009), Scientific Honor Award of the Japan Association of Flow-Injection Analysis (2003), prizes of Minister of National Education of Poland (1975,1980,1991), and prize of Minister of Environmental Protection of Poland (1972). In 2012, he was granted the Officer's Cross of the Order Polonia Restituta, and prize of Minister of Science and Education for the life achievements in science.

== Books and editorials ==
- Advances in Flow Analysis, Wiley-VCH, Marek Trojanowicz (ed.), Weinheim, 2008, pp. 702,
- Analiza przepływowa. Metody i zastosowania , P. Kościelniak, M. Trojanowicz (ed.), Vol. I, Uniwersytet Jagielloński Press, Kraków, 2005, pp. 256,
- Analiza przepływowa. Metody i zastosowania, P. Kościelniak, M. Trojanowicz (ed.), Vol. II, Uniwersytet Jagielloński Press, Kraków, 2008, pp. 262,
- Flow Injection Analysis. Instrumentation and Applications. World Scientific Publishing, Singapore, 2000, pp. 481,
- Automatyzacja w analizie chemicznej, WNT, Warszawa, 1992, pp. 514.
