= Danuta Kobylińska-Walas =

Polish sea captain (1931–2025)

- Born: 27 November 1931; Kozietuły, Poland
- Died: 21 June 2025 (aged 93)
- Occupation: Sea captain

Danuta Kobylińska-Walas (also Danuta Walas-Kobylińska; 27 November 1931 – 21 June 2025) was the first female sea captain in Poland. She was the first Polish woman to successfully train for the profession of sailor and reach the position of Sea Captain. She studied at the Maritime University of Szczecin. Kobylińska-Walas was a nautical captain from 1962 and led among others MS Kopalnia Wujek, Kołobrzeg II, MS Toruń, MS Bieszczady, MS Powstaniec Wielkopolski, MS Budowlany, MS Uniwersytet Toruński, MS Jarosław, and MS Malbork. She later retired and lived in Warsaw and Szczecin. Kobylińska-Walas died on 21 June 2025, at the age of 93.

== Orders ==
- Polonia Restituta Knight's Cross
- Medal of the 40th Anniversary of People's Poland
