= Krzysztof Sońta =

Polish politician (1968–2025)

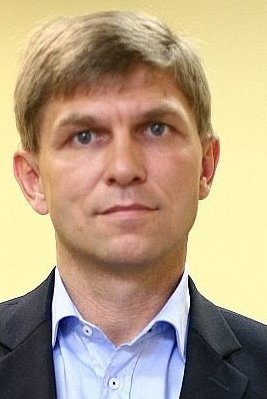

Member of the Sejm
- In office 5 June 2014 – 9 October 2015
- In office 5 November 2007 – 7 November 2011

Personal details
- Born: Krzysztof Jan Sońta; 6 May 1968; Radom, Polish People’s Republic
- Died: 6 January 2025 (aged 56); Warsaw, Poland
- Political party: PiS
- Education: Józef Piłsudski University of Physical Education, Warsaw; University of Warsaw; Catholic University of Lublin
- Occupation: Schoolteacher

Krzysztof Jan Sońta (6 May 1968 – 6 January 2025) was a Polish politician. A member of Law and Justice, he served in the Sejm from 2007 to 2011 and again from 2014 to 2015.

Sońta died on 6 January 2025, at the age of 56.
