= Zenon Pigoń =

Polish trade unionist and politician (1940–2023)

Member of the Sejm
- In office 18 June 1989 – 25 November 1991
- Constituency: Constituency No. 36

Personal details
- Born: 29 June 1940 Chervonoarmiysk, Ukrainian SSR, USSR
- Died: 13 January 2023 (aged 82) Bytom, Poland
- Party: OKP
- Education: University of Silesia in Katowice
- Occupation: Trade unionist

Zenon Pigoń (29 June 1940 – 13 January 2023) was a Polish trade unionist and politician. A member of the Citizens Parliamentary Party, he served in the Sejm from 1989 to 1991.

Pigoń died in Bytom on 13 January 2023, at the age of 82.
