= Bolesław Rakoczy =

Polish historian (1943–2025)

Bolesław Kazimierz Rakoczy (religious name Eustachy Rakoczy; 24 February 1943 – 12 December 2025) was a Polish historian.

== Life and career ==
Rakoczy was born in Budzyń on 24 February 1943, and was a Pauline Christian. In 1962, he graduated from High School in Chodzież. In the same year, he joined the Pauline Order in Częstochowa and took the name Eustachy. After studying theology at the Academy of Catholic Theology, he was ordained a priest on 13 June 1970. In 1994, he obtained a doctorate in humanities in the field of history at ATK in Warsaw, and in 2002 he obtained a postdoctoral degree in theology. In the years 2000–2006, he was the vice-rector, and in the years 2006–2007 the rector of the Polish Academy in Częstochowa.

From 1975, he was nominated by the Primate of Poland, Cardinal Stefan Wyszyński, the Chaplain of the Soldiers of Independence of Jasna Góra. Organizer of veterans' pastoral care in the 1970s and 1980s. From 1989, he was the Chief Chaplain of the Piłsudski Association.^{.} In 2000, he was awarded the title of "Outstanding Wielkopolska", and on 5 December 2014 he was appointed brigadier general of this Association. In 2001, he was awarded the statuette of the Drummer of the Greater Poland Uprising, awarded by the Main Board of the Society for the Remembrance of the Greater Poland Uprising in 1918–1919.

Rakoczy was named an Honorary citizen of Chodzież. He died on 12 December 2025, at the age of 82.
