= Karol Krasnodębski =

Polish politician (1929–2025)

Member of the Sejm
- In office 4 July 1989 – 25 October 1991

Personal details
- Born: Karol Szymon Krasnodębski; 3 September 1929 Warsaw, Poland
- Died: 2 January 2025 (aged 95)
- Party: KO "S"
- Education: Cracow University of Technology
- Occupation: Engineer

Karol Szymon Krasnodębski (3 September 1929 – 2 January 2025) was a Polish politician. A member of the Solidarity Citizens' Committee, he served in the Sejm from 1989 to 1991.

Krasnodębski died on 2 January 2025, at the age of 95.
