= Zdzisław Skupień =

Polish mathematician (1938–2025)

Zdzisław Skupień (27 November 1938 – 1 January 2025) was a Polish mathematician, expert in optimization, discrete mathematics, and graph theory, academic, and dr. hab. (1982).

Skupień was born in Świlcza, Poland. In 1964, Skupień introduced the concept of "locally Hamiltonian graphs".

In 1976, Skupień introduced the concept of "homogeneously traceable graphs".

Skupień authored over 140 publications. He died on 1 January 2025, at the age of 86.

== Awards ==
- 1998: Medal of the Commission for National Education (Medal Komisji Edukacji Narodowej)
- 1988: Order of Polonia Restituta (Krzyż Kawalerski Orderu Odrodzenia Polski)
- 1983: Cross of Merit (Złoty Krzyż Zasługi)
