= Jennifer Aldridge =

- The Archers character
- Portrayed by: Angela Piper (1963–2022)
- Duration: 1951–2022
- First appearance: 1 January 1951
- Last appearance: 15 February 2022 (Note: The character's death took place on 22 January 2023, but she was last heard on 15 February 2022.)
- Created by: Godfrey Baseley
- Introduced by: Godfrey Baseley
In-universe information
- Occupation: Housewife
- Father: Jack Archer
- Mother: Peggy Archer
- Brothers: Tony Archer
- Sisters: Lilian Bellamy
- Husband: Roger Travers-Macy (1969–1976); Brian Aldridge (1976–2023)
- Sons: Adam Macy
- Daughters: Kate Aldridge; Debbie Aldridge; Alice Carter
- Grandsons: Sipho Madikane; Xander Macy-Craig
- Granddaughters: Phoebe Aldridge; Noluthando Madikane; Martha Carter
- Grandfathers: Dan Archer
- Grandmothers: Doris Archer; Polly Perkins
- Uncles: Phil Archer
- Aunts: Christine Barford
- First cousins: Shula Hebden Lloyd; Kenton Archer; David Archer; Elizabeth Pargetter

Jennifer Aldridge (also Archer) is a fictional character from the BBC Radio 4 soap opera The Archers. The character first appeared in 1951. The role was played by a variety of actresses, until Angela Piper joined the cast in June 1963. Piper was on the show for almost 60 years and was the second-longest-running cast member, until Jennifer died during the episode broadcast on 22 January 2023. The Telegraph had called Piper's voice "somehow sharp and yielding at the same time, like a scone topped with homemade jam."

Jennifer was the daughter of Jack Archer (Denis Falwell) and Peggy Woolley (June Spencer) and the mother of Adam Macy (Andrew Wincott), Debbie Aldridge (Tamsin Greig), Kate Aldridge (Perdita Avery) and Alice Carter (Hollie Chapman). Jennifer featured in some of the show's most high-profile and controversial storylines, mainly involving her family or her relationship with husband Brian Aldridge (Charles Collingwood).

Throughout her almost six decades on the programme, Jennifer experienced what some consider the usual ups-and-downs of soap opera characters. During her teenage years in Ambridge, she had a dalliance with the local cowman and later the birth of their son out of wedlock, a divorce, her marriage to wealthy landowner Brian Aldridge, coping with his numerous affairs, the loss of her Home Farm farmstead and many financial woes.

Newspaper, The Derbyshire Life, called Piper one of the "most recognisable and distinctive voices in Britain", while Piper herself called Jennifer "capable, caring, family-oriented, well-groomed and more intelligent than many are prepared to admit". The Archers official website described the character as someone who enjoyed "bragging about her children's successes" and disliked "anything that endangered her social status".

The character's widespread popularity also led Piper to write Jennifer Aldridge's Cookbook, selling more than 40,000 copies.

== Casting ==
Various child actors played the role of Jennifer Archer from the show's inception right through to the early 1960s. Angela Piper was in her mid-20s when the chance arose to join The Archers in 1963. The actress who was playing the role of Jennifer was leaving to join British medical soap opera Emergency – Ward 10. Piper was offered the role, after some years working in Repertory Theatre. "It was then on an amazing level, The Archers. The characters were an intrinsic part of everyone's home. And there they were, which was really exciting," Piper said in a 2013 interview with the BBC. Piper recalls receiving notes from the directors to make the character more "couldn't care less" and "a bit of a tearaway" in those early years.

== Character development and impact ==
=== Early years ===
In her fictional backstory, Jennifer was born on 7 January 1945 to Peggy Perkins and Jack Archer. Despite having a small role in the series through the 1950s, it was not until the early 1960s that the "rebellious" Jennifer became prominent in the show. At 16, Jennifer worried her mother by returning from a ski trip early with a boyfriend called Max. Her father Jack bought her a moped to travel to her teacher training college in Walsall. Her Aunt Laura then appointed a chauffeur, young Roger Patillo. Jennifer began dating him, only to discover his real surname was 'Travers-Macy'. The next year, Jennifer qualified as a teacher and began work at Hollerton Primary School and achieved some success as a writer.

=== Illegitimate child controversy ===
Jennifer evolved from "rebellious" teenager to a loving member of the Ambridge community over her time on the programme. In 1966, Jennifer abandoned plans to become a teacher and a writer and slept with the local cowman, Paddy Redman, which led to the birth of her son Adam, out of wedlock. Piper recalled the "fabulous" storyline enabled Jennifer to be the "representative of a rebellious generation". Shortly before Christmas Day in 1966, Jennifer told her sister Lilian she was pregnant. At the time, Jennifer turned to Jill Archer (Patricia Greene), who urged her to come clean to her parents. Her grandmother, Doris Archer (Gwen Berryman) told Jennifer she must immediately marry Paddy upon finding out, and her alcoholic father Jack threatened to throw her out of home. "One of my press cuttings says: Jennifer expects – by kind permission of the Director General," Piper recalled in a BBC interview. A banner was also held over Waterloo Bridge at the time with the line "Doris Archer is a prude" scrawled on it. The shockwaves from the birth were so great on the show, the character departed temporarily, but returned – with baby in tow – to face the village. "I got a letter written on lined notepaper from an elderly brother and sister living together in Plaistow (in London's East End)," Piper recalled. "They said they were very upset that I (Jennifer) might be thrown out of my home, Peggy being as she is, so they said they would take me in. I thought 'how sweet' and ignored it. But then I got another letter saying the brother had redecorated their front bedroom ready for me to come with the baby. And I thought 'ha ha' and ignored that one. And then I got a third letter, some time later, saying 'my brother has been sitting at Paddington station waiting for the trains coming in from Hollerton Junction'." In 2016, The Guardian journalist Susannah Clapp named the storyline of the "10 best Archers storylines", saying "Jennifer once had the waywardness of her daughter Kate, and the romantic spirit of her youngest, Alice". In an interview for the programme's 70th anniversary, Piper revealed the storyline somewhat imitated her own life. "It was extraordinary because I was reading my scripts and Jennifer was feeling a bit queasy and was rushing off to the loo and I thought I wasn't feeling too well myself and joked I was taking my part a little too seriously. Then, I also discovered I was expecting a baby at the same time."

=== Marriage to Brian Aldridge ===
In 1974, Jennifer moved in with her aunt, Christine Barford, after separating from Roger after he became a travelling salesman. Fresh from the divorce to her first husband, Roger Travers-Macy, Jennifer met the Sherborne-educated Brian Aldridge at a dinner party hosted by Carol Tregorran. Not long after, the couple wed on 29 May 1976. The official Archers website says this began "Jennifer's ascendance to the social pinnacle of Ambridge" and developed the character into "the elegant, capable pillar of the community". "She suddenly latched on to someone who had a fair amount of money," Piper says. "I don't think it was knowingly done but she assumed the position of a wealthy farmer's wife and she's grown into that". In an interview, Charles Collingwood said Brian was worth "millions" upon his introduction into the show in 1975. Jennifer moved into Home Farm and continued to work part-time at Grey Gables. In 1978, Jennifer and Jill opened the Two Jays craft studio within a converted barn at Home Farm. But it was short-lived, closing within months of opening.

=== Affairs of the heart and the "mind" ===
Jennifer was working on a collaborated history of Ambridge with antique expert John Tregorran when the pair had an "affair of the mind". He wanted it to go further, but Jennifer let him down gently. Jennifer and Brian's marriage was rocked in 1985, when Brian's affair with Caroline Sterling (Sara Coward) was discovered. "There had been the Caroline Bone thing, and the Mandy Beesborough thing. Up to a point I think she's felt quite flattered that her husband can still pull these younger, good looking, stylish women. And of course, she's had her moments in the past," Piper said.

=== Brian's affair with Siobhan Hathaway ===
Out of all of Brian's affairs, his dalliance with Siobhan Hathaway (Caroline Lennon) was one of the show's most high-profile storylines. Church leaders and newspaper columnists debated the fling, which saw Brian start up an illicit affair with Hathaway, a much-younger married doctor's wife between 2001–2002. The episodes leading up to Brian's admission to Jennifer were heard by 4.75 million listeners, and more than 6000 people sent emails to the BBC over the so-called "hayseed porn". Brian and Siobhan's son, Ruairi, was born in 2002, and brought back to The Archers in 2007 upon the death of Siobhan from cancer. Jennifer, deciding to forgive Brian, took pity on his son and welcomed him into her home. "Seeing him when Jennifer went out to Ireland. That was the point where she decided she had to take Ruairi on. Even though he was her husband's lovechild," Piper says.

=== Departure from Home Farm ===
After 40 years of living at Home Farm, Jennifer and Brian were forced to sell the farm house in 2018 to cover the financial fallout from the toxic contamination that leaked from his land. The couple downsized, much to Jennifer's dismay, and moved into Willow Cottage in 2019. The Aldridges got off on the wrong foot with neighbour Kirsty Miller (Annabelle Dowler), first by a loud birthday party and then Jennifer accidentally cutting her phone line while trimming a bush. Brian got his court papers in January 2019 and told his wife he would plead 'not guilty' to the charges, and would fight any hefty fine he was handed.

=== Death and aftermath ===
In the episode broadcast on 22 January 2023, Jennifer is spending a weekend away with her sister Lillian (Sunny Ormonde) at a spa in Stratford-upon Avon. While Jennifer is alone at the hotel she goes into cardiac arrest. Lillian calls Jennifer's husband, Brian, and tells him that paramedics have taken her to Warwick Hospital, and he rallies the family to be around her. As Kate, Adam, Alice, Lillian and Justin wait outside Jennifer's hospital room, Brian emerges and announces that doctors did "everything they could, but her heart just wasn't strong enough." Brian ends the episode saying: "I'm so sorry, your mother, my Jenny, she's gone." Subsequent episodes dealt with the family, and the larger community, coming to terms with the character's death. It was also revealed in later episodes that Jennifer had been diagnosed with a potentially fatal disease called aortic stenosis. Brian and Tony were the only family members who knew about her diagnosis, which angered those who had been left out of the loop. In the episode broadcast 27 January 2023, Kate finds a journal her mother had been keeping shortly before her death. As she and siblings Adam and Alice read it they discover the reason their mother didn't want them to know about her condition was because she was "putting the good things first". In the same episode, Jolene Archer (Buffy Davis) leads drinkers at The Bull in a toast for Jennifer, calling her "one of Ambridge's most remarkable and beloved residents".

Fans of the show had speculated on social media for months about the future of the character due to Piper's long absence from the series. Piper was last heard on the show in an episode broadcast on 15 February 2022 but had been noticeably absent thereafter, only being referred to by other on-air characters. After the broadcast of Jennifer's death, the BBC confirmed Piper had "retired" from the show after 60 years. Fans of the show flooded social media with tributes following the episode, calling it "sad and unexpected."

The Telegraph's Charlotte Runcie called Jennifer's death "the end of an era for an Archer's icon", adding while she wasn't easily likeable "over 60 years she certainly had her share of dramatic storylines". "Jennifer's death came at the end of an episode that was otherwise quite mundane, blowing everything apart. Despite the trauma of her end, not least for Lilian, it was good of the writers to give her a wonderfully fitting final weekend in Stratford-upon-Avon, spent at the spa and visiting the Shakespeare's Birthplace museum. Maybe for Jennifer, heaven was a place on Earth, too," Runcie wrote.

In a blog post on The Archer's official website, editor Jeremy Howe paid tribute to the character and the actress, saying: "Jennifer was fabulously snobbish, fabulously judgemental but sharp as a tack, very funny and rarely wrong. You might well cross the Village Green to avoid coming under her fire, but if you were in harm's way she would be the first to rescue you. There will only ever be one Jennifer Aldridge, and Angela Piper has played her magnificently."
