= Jill Archer =

- The Archers character
- Portrayed by: Patricia Greene
- Duration: 1957–2025
- First appearance: 25 July 1957
- Last appearance: 22 September 2025
- Created by: Godfrey Baseley
- Introduced by: Godfrey Baseley
In-universe information
- Occupation: Housewife
- Husband: Phil Archer (1957–2010)
- Sons: Kenton Archer; David Archer
- Daughters: Shula Hebden Lloyd; Elizabeth Pargetter
- Grandsons: Josh Archer; Ben Archer; Freddie Pargetter; Dan Hebden-Lloyd
- Granddaughters: Pip Archer; Lily Pargetter; Meriel Archer
- Other relatives: Rosie Archer

Jill Archer (née Patterson) is a fictional character from the BBC Radio 4 soap opera The Archers. She was portrayed by Patricia Greene from 1957. Writers for the show paired Jill with Phil Archer (Norman Painting), their marriage lasting until Phil's death in 2010. Greene is the world's longest-serving actor in a soap opera, in any medium. In 2018, Jill was featured in 37 of the show's almost 300 episodes for the year and continued to play a prominent role in the show.

Jill's storylines often revolve around the core Archer's family. The official BBC calls the character a "loving but controlling matriarch" who "rules the roost at Brookfield" and a "tough and determined mother". In her 68 years in the role, Jill has endured the loss of her husband, raising several children, campaigning for local issues, being arrested for throwing a flapjack during a protest and fighting plans to sell Brookfield.

The Archers editor, Huw Kennair-Jones, has described Jill as a "lynchpin" and said there would "always be stories" for her in the programme. The Daily Telegraph has called Jill a "legend to millions of listeners".

Greene died on 9 July 2026, aged 95. Her final appearance as Jill was broadcast on 22 September 2025.

== Creation and casting ==
=== Casting ===
When Greene joined the cast of The Archers in 1957, she was hired for six weeks to play Jill Patterson. The character was written to catch the eye of local farmer Phil Archer, a widower who lost his wife Grace in a barn fire in 1955; the BBC famously killed off the character to distract from the launch of the ITV television network, the first television competitor to the radio station. Greene recalls the call sheet describing Jill as a "sexy blonde", so she "vamped it up" and did an imitation of actress Fenella Fielding. "Unfortunately, I got the job", Greene joked in an interview with Radio Times. In an interview with the BBC upon her 60th anniversary with the show, Greene says she was told the character was a “sexy, blonde in a tea tent”. Greene's first words as Jill, which appeared in the same episode, were, “and now I’ll show you the fifteenth use to which this very versatile little household gadget can be put…”

The producers enjoyed the chemistry between Painting and Greene, and extended her contract upon Jill's final episode. The editor Godfrey Baseley told Greene: "Congratulations! Forget the sex; you're going to marry him!" In 2017, Greene was paid £16,000 for her work on the show.

=== Longevity ===
In the 1980s, BBC management considered killing off large numbers of characters, or even cancelling the show altogether. Greene recalls she was one of those in "jeopardy": "Norman Painting was writing scripts. And he used to come back from story conferences and say ‘Jill and Phil are off. We’re going to farm in Guernsey.’ And I thought: ‘Great! I can get back to theatre work.’ But we survived." On another occasion, bosses reprimanded the actress for using profanities and acting out sex scenes in theatre productions. "The BBC top brass called me in and said: ‘We hear you’re going to say the f-word and do sex scenes. Why?’ Well, because I'm an actress.”

Greene told the Radio Times she cannot imagine playing the role into her late 90s, like co-star June Spencer. She is driven to and from home on each recording day. “I’m not going to tell you, but I am 86. And I should miss it terribly. I don’t usually get emotional about storylines but I’m a bit emotional doing this one I’m doing now.” Greene says she knows the character better than anyone else, and says "left to her own devices" she is a "businesswoman or some sort". "I know her better than anybody in the world," she says. “If she (Jill) goes into the pub she has a sherry and it’s not a sweet sherry, Peggy may have a sweet sherry, but Jill certainly has a dry sherry.”

As part of her 60th anniversary, the show featured a comical storyline in which Jill is arrested for throwing a flapjack at a restaurant owner in protest over food waste.

Upon her death on 10 July 2026, Greene had played Jill for almost 70 years and earned a Guinness World Record for the world's longest-serving soap opera actor. She made her final appearance in the episode broadcast on 22 September 2025, as Jill visits Grace's grave.

== Development ==
=== Early years and motherhood ===
Jill Patterson was born on 3 October 1930. She arrived in Ambridge on 25 July 1957, when she caught the eye of Phil Archer at the local fete, opened by Humphrey Lyttelton. Phil, recently widowed, had snapped a photograph of Jill with his cine camera, and the two later dated. Initially, Jill told Phil she could never see herself marrying a farmer, but he persevered – ringing her boss to ask for her address! About a month after they had met, he asked her to marry him. Jill told him it was much too sudden but promised to think it over. She came back to Borchester to get to know Phil better and after some time she agreed to marry him. They would be no engagement and the wedding would be as soon as possible. Phil's mother, Doris, was rather wary of the match. Nevertheless, the couple were married in a quiet ceremony in a church in Crudley (where Jill was raised) on 16 November 1957. In 1958, Jill gave birth to twins, Shula and Kenton. The following year, she was pregnant again, and gave birth to a son, David Archer (Timothy Bentinck). She put on a brave face when a stained glass window was installed at St Stephen's Church, in memory of Phil's late wife Grace Archer. Of her first few years on the show, Greene says she always thought of the character as being "damaged". The character at one point even told Phil: "The one thing I always dreamt of was a husband, a home and a family of my very own". "She was looking for roots", Greene told the BBC in 2017. "Otherwise she surely wouldn't have married him so quickly." She also described Jill as an "outsider" upon her arrival. "She could ask questions about agriculture. She was really out of her element. She knew nothing of the countryside and she was suddenly thrown into this village". The couple later had another child, Elizabeth (Alison Dowling) in 1967, and the family moved into Brookfield Farm in 1969. Worryingly, Elizabeth is born with a narrow heart valve, but the newborn recovers after a series of operations.

=== Bringing up her children and opening a business ===
Jill supplemented the family income with a number of businesses, including a bed and breakfast, selling eggs and honey and opening a craft studio in 1978 with Jennifer Aldridge called Two Jays, built in a converted barn at Home Farm. But the business was not meant to be, and it closed within several months. Jill and Phil had to also deal with their children's respective partners. In 1984, Nigel Pargetter (Graham Seed) blundered into the couple's bedroom by accident, whispering 'tally-ho' and managed to drive off in another person's car by mistake. The couple became sole owners of Brookfield in 1986, but were forced by a capital tax bill to put some land up for sale. Jill was also uncomfortable when Elizabeth went out with Robin Fairbrother, the half-brother of Phil's first wife Grace. The relationship ended, however, when Elizabeth discovered Robin was married. Jill also battled with Ruth Archer (Felicity Finch) who was married to her son David. Jill's idea of a farmer's wife clashed with Ruth, after her daughter-in-law announced she was not going to be one to stay inside answering phones and baking cakes. Ruth also felt pressured to be like her mother-in-law, who fed the family with lemon drizzle cakes and large feasts. Jill was adamant it was the woman's role to be in-charge of the domestic chores. In the 1990s, Ruth offered to cook for Jill after feeling guilty she had done all of the housework. A suggestion of fish pie pleased Jill, but she turned her nose up at the idea once she found out it was store-bought.

=== Financial independence ===
Jill was also a firm believer in having her own money, that she had earned. She earned small amounts selling eggs and produce, but most of the work did outside the farm was voluntary, such as for Meals on Wheels, the WRVS and the WI. In the 1980s, Jill was only allowed an allowance from Phil, something that constantly frustrated her, especially when she had earned it herself. One scene between daughter Shula Hebden-Lloyd (Judy Bennett), Jill admitted she had already spent all of the money she earned from selling potatoes, even after Phil asked for it. “I’ve been doing all the work," she told her daughter. "When your father marches blithely in and announces that he’s off to the bank and can he have the potato money then I think it’s a bit thick.... Because I haven’t got it, I’ve spent it, I thought it was quite legitimately my perks on top of the housekeeping."

=== The over-sized family photo ===
As a golden wedding anniversary gift in 2007, Phil and Jill's children organised a family portrait photograph. It featured the couple's children (David, twins Kenton and Shula, and Elizabeth) and grandchildren (Pip, Josh, Ben, Dan, and twins Lily and Freddie). Ruth, Nigel and Alistair were also in it but Kathy, Kenton's partner at the time, was not included. Nor, was Meriel, his daughter in New Zealand.

When it came to ordering the print Kenton made the error or ordering in inches when he thought it was in centimetres. As a result, the photograph was huge and its subjects almost life size. When Phil and Jill got the portrait home to Glebe Cottage, they found it was too big for above the fireplace. They decided the best place for it was by the staircase but then after a great effort to hang it, Jill decided it looked preposterous from the bottom of the stairs. It ended up on display in the conservatory. When Carol Tregorran moved into Glebe Cottage seven years later the giant photo was still there. At her request, Kenton removed it and stored it away.

=== Phil's death and becoming a widow ===
Phil's sister-in-law Peggy Woolley (June Spencer), his sister Christine Barford (Lesley Saweard) and Jill were on a jaunt together in February 2010. Upon their return home, Jill remarked about Phil having "his music on" and went to put the kettle on for the three of them. Then she stopped. And said "Oh." Then Christine said "Jill?" and they said "Oh no" and "Oh no, Phil" and Phil's quietly elegiac music played on. Painting had died the previous October, and The Times called his death "as gentle as the man himself".

=== Jill's mystery man revealed ===
In February 2019, Jill talks to her children about a man she has met at The Laurels. She has begun seeing Leonard Berry (Paul Copley), a "dapper man" who is a volunteer at the nursing home and works alongside Jill. She introduces Leonard to the children and talks about how they dance in the big room at the home. However, Jill has her doubts about the relationship, and she confides in Peggy about the fear of walking out with her new friend and introducing him to her children.
