= Shula Hebden Lloyd =

- The Archers character
- Judy Bennett as Shula
- Portrayed by: Judy Bennett (1971–2024)
- Duration: 1958–2024
- First appearance: 8 August 1958
- Last appearance: 1 February 2024
- Created by: Godfrey Baseley
In-universe information
- Occupation: Stables owner Trainee vicar
- Father: Phil Archer
- Mother: Jill Archer
- Brothers: David Archer; Kenton Archer
- Sisters: Elizabeth Pargetter
- Husband: Mark Hebden (1985–1994); Alistair Lloyd (1998–2019)
- Sons: Daniel Hebden Lloyd
- Grandfathers: Dan Archer
- Grandmothers: Doris Archer
- Aunts: Christine Barford
- Nephews: Josh Archer; Ben Archer; Freddie Pargetter
- Nieces: Pip Archer; Lily Pargetter; Meriel Archer

Shula Hebden Lloyd (also Archer) is a fictional character from the British BBC Radio 4 soap opera The Archers. The character was introduced as the eldest daughter of Phil Archer and Jill Archer in 1958. Shula has been portrayed by Liverpudlian actress Judy Bennett since 1971. Bennett played the role for over 50 years, making her one of the longest-serving soap opera actors in the world. After Bennett announced her departure from the show in September 2022, Shula's exit scenes aired on 30 September. She later made brief returns in December 2023 and February 2024.

A devout Christian with a heavy involvement in the Ambridge church and its parish council, Shula has been featured in some of the show's most controversial and high-profile storylines including the death of her first husband Mark, her affair with the village doctor, and her struggles to conceive children which ultimately led to a successful IVF treatment.

The Archers official website describes Shula as being a "pillar of the church" whose "first love was horses" and has a "sometimes troubled heart". Bennett has been married to Archers co-star Charles Collingwood, who plays Brian Aldridge, since 1975.

== Creation and casting ==
=== Characterisation ===
Before assuming the role of Shula, Judy Bennett was forging a career playing children in some of BBC Radio's most successful children's shows. Her husband, Charles Collingwood, says when the call went out for the casting of 12-year-old Shula Archer, a fellow cast member cried: "Judy Bennett - she's so talented - I hate her!". While playing the role, Judy would also play the roles of her younger siblings Kenton and Elizabeth, as well as her cousin Adam Macy, until his voice broke.

=== Marriage to Charles Collingwood ===
Bennett and Collingwood began working on children's shows together in the early 1970s and became a "proper couple" in 1974. He credits her for gaining his role the following year as Brian Aldridge. "We very seldom work together on The Archers," Bennett says. "We're rarely in the same episodes, so often we're ships that pass in the night. I'll go up to Pebble Mill for a morning recording and he'll go up in the afternoon. We don't talk about The Archers that much, because it's only for one week a month and we do other things the rest of the time. But I like having him in the cast, it's the companionship".

== Development ==
=== Early years ===
Shula Archer was born into the show on 8 August 1958. Phil and Jill named their children 'Shula' and 'Kenton' by throwing alphabet blocks into the air. Shula would start her A levels with the hopes of becoming an event rider in 1973. Three years later, Shula realised she would never have the successful riding career she wanted, and decided to backpack across Europe. The official The Archers website said Shula had "plenty of boyfriends" upon her return, including Neil Carter and Nigel Pargetter. But it was Simon Parker, editor of the Borchester Echo, who won her heart. Everything was going swimmingly until Simon published a photo of Shula on horseback headlined "Hunting on the Dole". She later lost her virginity to him in a cornfield. In 1978, Shula was dumped by Simon Parker and fled for London, where she found work and began dating her father's former farming student, Nick Wearing. The couple left for an overland hippy backpacking trip. But the holiday did not go to plan, with Nick continuing on to Australia and Shula landing a job in Bangkok. But she returned to Ambridge after her passport and money were stolen.

=== Engagement to Mark Hebden ===
Flighty Shula finally won the acceptance of her parents when she began dating lawyer Mark Hebden (Richard Derrington). The union was going well until Mark took a swipe at the Borchester bench, labelling Shula's father, Phil Archer, and other magistrates as "amateurs". Nonetheless, Shula accepted his marriage proposal. Tragedy struck later in 1980 when her grandmother Doris Archer (Gwen Berryman) died peacefully in Glebe Cottage. Shula found Doris, and then made her way over to St Stephen's to tell her Aunt Christine Barford her mother had just died. Doris left Glebe Cottage to Shula in her will, and the 22-year-old began preparing for her impending nuptials. Stressed by the upcoming wedding, Shula found comfort in flirting with another journalist, Robin Catchpole. She remained faithful, but called the wedding off with only six weeks to go. Mark moved on with his life, allowing David Archer's ex-girlfriend Jackie Woodstock, to move into his cottage. A livid Shula, angry at the thought of another woman sharing the home she'd planned to set up with Mark, began dating hippie Ben Warner. She dumped him when he was convicted of burglary. In 1983, Mark become engaged to upper-crust Sarah Locke. Shula began dating Nigel Pargetter, a door-to-door swimming pool salesman. Shula would soon break up with Nigel, as Mark would also break off his engagement and move to Hong Kong. But her heart was still with him, and she flew to Hong Kong in 1985. Mark returned with her, and the pair were married in September. Shula would later become manager of The Estate, while Mark took a job at a Birmingham law firm. In 1989, Shula persuaded Mark to invest almost £50,000 in her brother Kenton's antique business. The financial outlay put stress on the marriage, amplified by the fact the couple could not conceive. Shula was eventually diagnosed with endometriosis. She then decided to give up having a baby due to the strain on the marriage. Her sister Elizabeth's abortion in 1992 horrified Shula, given her ordeal in attempting to bear children.

=== Mark's death ===
In 1994, Mark was driving home when an out-of-control driver overtook him on a bend, and as he swerved to avoid Caroline Bone's horse, slammed into a tree and was killed instantly. His death was made even more tragic with the news Shula was finally pregnant. Shula organised with the local cricket club to commemorate his death annually with the Single Wicket Competition, with the winner awarded the Mark Hebden Trophy. The next year, Shula reignited her relationship with Simon. While dating Shula, Simon Pemberton was involved with Harriet, an old flame. Before Caroline could tell Shula, Guy died of a heart attack. When Shula defended Simon's actions over the funeral, Caroline spilled the beans. Shula confronted Simon, who lashed out at her. Although the relationship was over, she remained managing the Estate office. Simon hit his then girlfriend Debbie Aldridge (Tamsin Greig), who Shula urged to report to the police.

=== Marriage to Alistair Lloyd ===
Shula's began dating the local vet, Alistair Lloyd. All was well until her son Daniel developed juvenile arthritis. Being supported by Dr Richard Locke, Shula started an affair with him. But when she couldn't abandon her beloved Ambridge, Richard departed, making an enemy for Shula of his partner Usha Gupta. Betrayed Alistair nonetheless declared his continuing love on a walk up Lakey Hill. He and Shula were married on Christmas Eve. In 2001, Shula bought Christine's equestrian business.

=== Alistair's gambling addiction ===
Alistair developed a gambling addiction in 2003 after joining Nigel and Kenton's poker nights. At the height of the problem, Shula's credit card declined at the supermarket and by February he was in £8,000 worth of gambling debt. Shula discovered he'd been taking money from their joint account to fund his addiction, and borrowed money from David. Scouring gambling addiction websites for answers, Shula got Alistair back on track by being more "spontaneous" and taking walks and bike rides. They renovated the bedroom. But the couple would be rocked again when Alistair lost the Brookfield dairy factory contract and began gambling again, this time racking up a total debt of £100,000 – £40,000 on credit cards and £60,000 to Matt Crawford. The couple remortgaged the business to pay off the debts and Alistair started attending Gamblers Anonymous meetings.

=== Later years ===
Shula's son, Daniel, leaves Ambridge to join the Army in 2014. Four years later, Shula begins feeling unhappy in her marriage. She and Alistair undergo counselling and take meditation classes to try to repair their union. Exhausting all options, Shula and Alistair then opt to divorce. Alistair returns to gambling, although admitting it was "a few quid" on the horses.

Following her divorce, Shula decides to retrain as a vicar. Canon James Mustard of Exeter Cathedral found the character's calling "an interesting one". He noted "She's been a churchwarden for years, and very much in the orbit of St Stephen's. However, it does feel a little bit as if Shula fancies the local builder, doesn't know how to handle that, gets divorced, and then, in the vacuum, discovers a passion for Jesus." Mustard thought Shula's interview with the Borchesters Diocesan Director of Ordinands was portrayed well, but he thought that her decision was being played out as "a career change rather than a vocation."

=== Departure ===
On 23 September 2022, the BBC confirmed Bennett had decided to leave The Archers after 51 years. Her final appearance as Shula aired on 30 September 2022, as Shula leaves the village to become an ordained vicar. Of her departure, Bennett stated "I've absolutely loved it and met so many friends. But the time has come to leave and I'm feeling happy". Although Bennett rarely shared scenes with her husband Charles Collingwood's character Brian, they had a chance to act together during her last recording session. The scene sees Brian telling Shula that he hopes she will stay in touch. Editor Jeremy Howe praised the character's journey and portrayal by Judy Bennett, stating "Judy's wonderful Shula rarely raises her silken voice, and has always sounded calm and reasonable as she rampaged through the village, travelling from everybody's nightmare image of a teenager across half a century of broken hearts and marriages to becoming a pillar of the Ambridge community. Judy has been a brilliant Shula. Thank you Judy. We shall miss you." Bennett reprised the role in December 2023, as Shula returns to talk to Lilian Bellamy (Sunny Ormonde) about her plans for The Stables. She returned again on 1 February 2024 after Kenton is attacked by a dog outside The Bull.
