= Christine Barford =

Fictional character from BBC show The Archers

- The Archers character
- Lesley Saweard as Christine Barford
- Portrayed by: Pamela Mant (1951–1953); Lesley Saweard (1953–1962, 1968–2019); Joyce Gibbs (1962–1968)
- Duration: 1951–2019
- First appearance: 1 January 1951
- Last appearance: 30 December 2019
- Created by: Godfrey Baseley
- Introduced by: Godfrey Baseley
In-universe information
- Occupation: Stables owner (retired)
- Father: Dan Archer
- Mother: Doris Archer
- Brothers: Phil Archer; Jack Archer
- Husband: Paul Johnson (1956–1978); George Barford (1978–2005)
- Adoptive sons: Peter Johnson
- Grandfathers: John Archer; William Forrest
- Grandmothers: Phoebe Archer; Lisa Forrest
- Uncles: Ben Archer; Frank Archer; Ted Forrest; Tom Forrest
- Nephews: Kenton Archer; David Archer; Tony Archer
- Nieces: Shula Hebden Lloyd; Elizabeth Pargetter; Jennifer Aldridge; Lilian Bellamy

Christine Barford (also Archer and Johnson) is a fictional character from the British BBC Radio 4 soap opera, The Archers. The character was introduced as the sister of Phil Archer in 1951, and the daughter of Dan and Doris Archer. The character was a skilled horsewoman, who for many years ran the Ambridge riding stables. British actress Lesley Saweard played the role from 1953 to 2019, with a six-year break in the mid-1960s, making her one of the longest-serving soap opera actors in the world. Saweard was last heard in the episode broadcast 30 December 2019.

Saweard describes her character as a "likable, reliable, capable person, very like her mother Doris" but who "sadly doesn't see much of her son Peter". The character lives in an apartment at The Laurels assisted living facility, and is nicknamed 'Auntie Chris' by many of the characters in the show.

== Creation and casting ==
=== Casting ===
The character of Christine Archer was originally played by actress Pamela Mant when the series when The Archers was first broadcast nationally from January 1, 1951. Christine was a close friend of her brother Phil's future wife, Grace Fairbrother. In late 1953, Saweard, aged 19, was asked to drive Denis Folwell (who played Jack Archer) from Lincoln Station and take him to a fete opening. He told Saweard how "similar her voice was to Pamela Mant" to which Saweard replied: "let me know if she's ill". Mant left the series abruptly that year, and at Folwell's suggestion, Saweard was asked to audition. The Archers official website says she was "pronounced a perfect voice match and the change in actress went unnoticed". In 1962 the role was taken over by Joyce Gibbs, with Saweard returning in 1968.

Saweard made fewer and fewer appearances in her later years on The Archers. The actress appeared in three episodes in 2016, 11 episodes in 2017, and 10 episodes in 2018. Saweard made her final appearance in the episode broadcast on 30 December 2019. In the episode, the character is among a group of guests travelling from The Laurels to see the performance of Ghost Stories in the Attic. Her final line in the series is: "I better go, our minibus is due any minute – thanks again all".

== Development ==
=== The early years ===
Christine's first appearance was during a New Year's Eve party at Brookfield Farm in 1951. The following year Christine started up the riding stables with her wealthy best-friend and sister-in-law, Grace Archer. Sadness followed, as she discovered her boyfriend, Dick Raymond, was actually already engaged. This led Christine to almost flee Ambridge and go travelling with the mysterious Lady Hylberrow to Ethiopia. Tragedy struck when Grace was killed in a stable fire in 1955, trying to rescue Midnight, Christine's horse. In 1956, Christine wed Paul Johnson, much to his family's chagrin. The Johnsons believed they were in "social superiority" to the Archers. The book, Who's Who in The Archers, described Paul as a "flaky" husband. But the marriage was not without its hiccups - with Christine accusing her husband of having an affair with Marianne Peters. Paul lost his job in 1962, and forced Christine to leave her stables business for Newmarket, where he would train as a helicopter pilot. He later found life as a crop-dusting helicopter pilot was not as glamorous, or well-paying, as he hoped, and the couple moved back to Ambridge a year later. Christine and Paul never had children, which made Paul become a father-figure to friend Carol's fatherless son Richard. The couple decided to adopt, and welcomed Peter into their home.

Christine Barford with her horse, Midnight, in a promotion photo from the 1950s.

=== Paul Johnson's death and marriage to George Barford ===
Jennifer Archer moved in with Christine in 1974 while Paul was in Germany trying to set up his horsebox business. Upon his return to the country, Paul moved to London. He would return in 1976 to Ambridge after admitting to having an affair with a colleague and chucking in his job. The next year, he left Christine for good after his fish-farming business failed and he went bankrupt. While Christine worked her way through the separation, gamekeeper and former policeman George Barford (Graham Roberts) and Nora McAuley had split. George and Christine would be thrown together when in 1978, Paul is killed in a car accident in Germany. The pair married once George's divorce was finalised, despite the doubts of the Archer family. This was despite her uncle, Tom Forrest, also being a gamekeeper. An obituary for Roberts in The Telegraph described George and Christine's marriage as " enduring and happy, a testament, perhaps, to George Barford's hidden depths" despite coming from "distinctly different class backgrounds". The Bishop of Truro at the time spoke out in the media over the impact of family values, given Christine was marrying George, who was a divorcee.

=== Firebombing and George's death ===
During his time as a policeman, George was responsible for pinning a string of burglaries to Susan Carter's brother, Clive Horrobin. Horrobin had also held up the village shop in 1993, and knocked George unconscious in 1997. In 2003, there was a spate of "horse slashings" at The Stables. Clive was named as the culprit, under the belief George and Christine still lived there. After being imprisoned for four months, Clive returned in 2004 and held the Barford's up at gunpoint in their home. When Phil unexpectedly called, Clive was roused and made off with the gun. Little more than a week later, Clive petrol-bombed their house, The Old Police Station, leaving Christine and Jill Archer trapped inside. George and Christine were left homeless. The episode left Christine shaken, and a year later, George died while waiting to move into their new home.

=== Later years ===
The death of George put paid to any plans Christine had to a quiet retirement. She was forced to give up The Stables and riding instructing, selling the business to her niece Shula Hebden-Lloyd. Christine then moved in with her long-time sister-in-law Peggy Woolley (June Spencer) at The Lodge. In 2017, conman Matt Crawford was targeting the people of Ambridge, including Lilian Bellamy and Justin Elliott. Christine was revealed to be one of the victims, having invested more than £300,000. Christine sold her house to Fallon to invest in Crawford's Melling Enterprises. In 2018, Christine moved into The Laurels assisted living facility after tripping over Peggy's cat Hilda and breaking her hip. With Christine impoverished due to her being deceived the year earlier, Peggy paid for her stay at the care facility for the elderly. The accident led to Christine withdrawing from many social gatherings, out of fear of having a similar fall. Once recovered, Christine decided to move into a self-contained apartment at The Laurels, which she was able to fund herself. In May 2025, it was revealed that Peggy left money in her will to continue funding Christine's stay at The Laurels.

In the episode broadcast 30 January 2023, Lynda Snell (Carole Boyd) mentions to Lilian she visited Christine at The Laurels to document her memories of Jennifer for the village website tribute. Christine told Lynda about the times when Jennifer, Tony and Lilian grew up at The Bull, then owned by their parents.
