= Angela Piper =

English actress

Angela Piper is an English actress. She is best known for her portrayal of Jennifer Aldridge in the BBC radio drama The Archers, a role she played from 1963 to 2022.

== Early life ==
Piper grew up in Melbourne, Derbyshire and moved to Castle Donington in her teens. Her father Arthur was an engineering teacher, while her mother, Hilda Pipes, was a member of Derby Poetry Society and ran a local drama group..

Piper attended Parkfield Cedars School in Derby and then Ashby-de-la-Zouch Girls' Grammar School, where she was encouraged to pursue a career in acting. She gained six O-levels in 1956, and lived at 41 Eastway, in Castle Donington.

She won a place at the Royal Academy of Music.

== Career ==
Piper presented Play School from May 1965, and appeared in the ITV series Life Begins at Forty and Third Time Lucky in the 1980s. From 1963 she voiced Jennifer in The Archers, and she was as of 2022 the third-longest serving current soap star worldwide. Piper had not appeared in the programme for some months before the character died on 22 January 2023, as Piper had decided to retire from the role.

== Personal life ==
Piper was married to Peter Bolgar, a former announcer at the BBC. The couple lived on the Suffolk border and had three children. Bolgar died aged 89 on January 31, 2025.

She married on Saturday May 12 1962 at St Edward's church Castle Donington, and moved to Roydon Hamlet in Essex. Her son Benjamin was born late August 1967, and another son in late November 1970. She had moved to Little Hadham by late 1970s. Her parents had lived in Thaxted from the late 1960s.

She later lived in Chrishall in north-east Essex, by the early 1980s. She contracted Hepatitis at a BBC party at Broadcasting House in May 1987. A chef was later found to have Hepatitis A. By the late 1990s she lived in Felsted in Essex. On September 11 1999 her 28 year old son married Rebecca Evans in Pembrokeshire.
