= Ysanne Churchman =

English actress (1925–2024)

- Born: Isabel Ann Churchman; 14 May 1925; Sutton Coldfield, Warwickshire, England
- Died: 4 July 2024 (aged 99); Birmingham, England
- Occupation: Actress
- Spouse: Tony Pilgrim (m. 1951; died 2015)

Ysanne Churchman (14 May 1925 – 4 July 2024) was an English actress. She starred and narrated on British radio, television and film for over 50 years, from 1938 to 1993. Churchman gained prominence as Grace Archer, wife of Phil, in the long-running BBC radio drama series The Archers; the series attracted publicity when Grace died after a fire on the night that ITV launched in 1955.

== Early life, family and education ==
Ysanne Churchman was born in Sutton Coldfield, Warwickshire, to Andrew Churchman and Gladys Dale, stage and radio performers in London.

She trained as a dancer at Cone-Ripman College.

== Career ==
As a youth in 1938, Churchman appeared on both BBC Radio Children's Hour and in a BBC Television play, Gallows Glorious. After learning repertory and theatre, she specialised in radio and voice work for film and television. She played Grace in the long-running radio series The Archers when Grace suffered grievous injuries in a fire on the night of the ITV launch in 1955; the character died in the following day's episode. She strongly suspected the producer was glad to be rid of her at the time, as she had discovered that some of her cast members in this regional, Birmingham production were not being paid Equity minimum rates and raised the matter. She voiced five other Archers characters over the years, the last being Mary Pound in 1983.

Along with many storytelling and reading roles on the BBC, she also performed as: Sara in the series Sara and Hoppity, Marla and Cassie in Space Patrol, the voice of Alpha Centauri in the series Doctor Who, and Soo the computer in The Flipside of Dominick Hide and its sequel. She was the first actress employed by Capital Radio, reading a serial book.

She retired in 1993, but continued to do the occasional voice-over and television appearance, including reprising her role as the voice of Delegate Alpha Centauri in the Doctor Who story "Empress of Mars" in 2017, having last voiced the character in 1974.

== Personal life ==
She married Tony Pilgrim MBE, a senior BBC engineer, in 1951. They were married for 63 years, until his death in January 2015.

Churchman died on 4 July 2024, at age 99.

== Selected credits ==
- Children's Hour, BBC Radio, 1938
- Gallows Glorious, BBC TV, 1938
- Red for Danger, BBC Radio, 1954
- The Archers, BBC Radio, 1951–1985 – Jennifer Archer, Grace Archer, Barbara Drury, Joan Ilverton, Jocelyn Page, Mary Pound.
- The Railway Children, BBC TV, 1957 – Ruth
- Sense and Sensibility, BBC Home Service (Radio 4), 1959/60 – Marianne Dashwood
- Sara and Hoppity, ITV, 1960, – Sara and other voices
- Space Patrol, ITV, 1963, – Marla and Cassiopeia
- Sherlock Holmes, BBC Radio, 1969 – Mary Sutherland
- Crossroads, ITV 1960s/1970s – four different appearances
- Doctor Who, 1972, The Curse of Peladon – Voice of Alpha Centauri
- Doctor Who, 1974, The Monster of Peladon – Voice of Alpha Centauri
- Doctor Who, 1974, Planet of the Spiders – Spider voices
- The Twelve Tasks of Asterix, 1976 – Additional Voices, English version
- Beasts, ITV 1976, "Special Offer" – Joyce
- Softly, Softly, BBC 1970s – four appearances
- Shoestring, 1979, "Knock For Knock" – Woman's voice
- A Dance to the Music of Time, 1979 – Milly
- We, the Accused, TV, 1980 – Edith Hanks
- The Flipside of Dominick Hide, 1980 – Soo (computer)
- Another Flip for Dominick, 1982 – Soo (house computer)
- Ghost in the Water, 1982, – Mrs. Parkes
- Amy, TV, 1984 – Lilly
- Starlings, TV, 1988 – Mrs Grimshaw
- Pyramid, documentary, 1988 – Voice artist
- Prostitute, 1991 – Magistrate
- Lipstick on Your Collar, TV, 1993 – Mrs Atterbow
- Oliver Twist, TV, 1999 – Woman in street
- Doctor Who, 2017, "Empress of Mars" – Voice of Alpha Centauri
