= The Archers =

British radio soap opera (since 1951)

- Genre: Radio drama
- Running time: 13 minutes
- Country of origin: United Kingdom
- Home station: BBC Light Programme (1951–1967); BBC Radio 4 (1967–present)
- Created by: Godfrey Baseley
- Produced by: Julie Beckett (2017–present)
- Edited by: Jeremy Howe (2018–present)
- Recording studio: BBC Birmingham
- Original release: 1 January 1951 – present
- No. of episodes: 21,068 as of 7 Nov 2026
- Audio format: Stereophonic sound
- Opening theme: "Barwick Green"
- Website: Official website

The Archers is a British radio soap opera broadcast on BBC Radio 4, the corporation's main spoken-word station. Broadcast since 1951, it was famously billed as "an everyday story of country folk" and is now promoted as "a contemporary drama in a rural setting". Having aired more than 20,000 episodes, it is the world's longest-running drama, by both number of episodes and duration.

The first of five pilot episodes was aired on Whit Monday, 29 May 1950, on the BBC Midlands Home Service, and the first episode broadcast nationally went out on New Year's Day 1951. A significant show in British popular culture, and with more than five million listeners, it is Radio 4's most listened-to non-news programme, and with more than one million listeners via the internet, the programme holds the record for BBC Radio online listening figures. In February 2019, a panel of 46 broadcasting industry experts, of whom 42 had a professional connection to the BBC, listed The Archers as the second-greatest radio programme of all time. Established partly with the aim of educating farmers following World War II, The Archers soon became a popular source of entertainment for the population at large, attracting nine million listeners by 1953.

== Setting ==
The Archers is set in the fictional village of Ambridge in the fictional county of Borsetshire, in England. Borsetshire is situated between what are in reality the contiguous counties of Worcestershire and Warwickshire, south of Birmingham in The Midlands of England. Ambridge is possibly based on the village of Cutnall Green, though various other villages claim to be the inspiration for Ambridge; The Bull, Ambridge's pub, is modelled on The Old Bull in Inkberrow, and Hanbury's St Mary the Virgin is often used as a stand-in for Ambridge's parish church, St Stephen's.

Other fictional villages include Penny Hassett, Loxley Barrett, Darrington, Hollerton, Edgeley, Waterley Cross and Lakey Green. The county town of Borsetshire is Borchester, and the nearest big city is the cathedral city of Felpersham. Felpersham also has a university. Anywhere further from Ambridge may be referred to humorously with comments such as "That's on the other side of Felpersham!", but characters do occasionally venture further: several attended the Countryside Alliance march in London, and there have been references to the gay scene in Manchester's Canal Street. There have been scenes set in other places in the United Kingdom and abroad, and characters have moved overseas to countries including South Africa and Hungary.

=== Ambridge locations ===
Ambridge has a village shop and post office, which survived thanks to the philanthropy of Jack Woolley (d. 2014). The business subsequently became a community shop managed by Susan and staffed by a team of volunteers.

- The Bull, the village's only pub, is perhaps the most recognisable structure in Ambridge along with St Stephen's Church. The church has undergone many changes over the years, and has had a number of vicars. The eight bells are rung by a group led by Neil Carter.
- Bridge Farm is a 168-acre (68 ha) farm previously on the Berrow Estate, but now owned by Pat and Tony Archer. The farm became wholly dedicated to organic farming in 1984, in a storyline inspired by a scriptwriter's visit to Brynllys farm in Ceredigion, the home of Rachel's Organic. In 2003, Tom Archer began producing his Bridge Farm pork sausages. In early 2013, the family decided to sell their dairy herd and buy organic milk instead, and the following year Tony bought a small Aberdeen Angus herd. Some years later it was decided to acquire a herd of Montbéliardes, and the farm recommenced producing organic milk to ensure the quality of cheese, ice cream and yoghurts. More recently they have added goats to the farm, initially as a hobby, but, having acquired a buck, they are now also looking to sell the meat.
- Brookfield Farm is a 469-acre (190 ha) mixed farm which was managed, and subsequently purchased, by Dan Archer, and then run by his son Phil. After Phil's retirement in 2001, his son David took over.
- Grange Farm was a working farm run by the Grundys as tenants until their eviction in 2000. The farmhouse, along with 50 acres (20 ha) of land, was sold to Oliver Sterling.
- Home Farm is a 1,922-acre (778 ha) farm, by far the largest in Ambridge, owned by the Aldridge family. Brian and Jennifer Aldridge had to sell the farmhouse, however, and move elsewhere in the village. Over the years Home Farm has expanded into soft fruit and deer farming.
- Willow Farm was owned by Roy and Betty Tucker. Following Betty's death in 2005, the house was divided to accommodate their son Roy and his family. Now, Brian Aldridge lives in part of it. The farmland is home to Neil Carter's pigs.
- Arkwright Hall is a large Victorian mansion with a 17th-century atmosphere. The building served as a community centre for many years, containing a soundproofed room and a field studies centre. Later it fell into disrepair, but was renovated when Jack Woolley leased the mansion to the Landmark Trust; architect Lewis Carmichael, who married Nigel Pargetter's mother Julia, led the restoration of the building to its Victorian splendour.
- Grey Gables, once a country club, is now a luxurious hotel. The late Caroline Sterling bought it with her husband Oliver. The hotel boasts a pool, a spa, a health club and a golf course. The hotel was sold in 2022 and was closed while undergoing extensive refurbishment.
- Lower Loxley Hall is a large 300-year-old country house located just outside Ambridge. It serves as a conference centre and wedding venue, and is open to the public.

== Characters ==
- The central family, the Archers, live at the family farm, Brookfield, which combines arable, dairy, beef and sheep. It is a typical example of mixed farming which has been passed down the generations from Dan, the original farmer, to his son Phil, and now to Phil and Jill's four children, who co-own it: David, who manages it with his wife Ruth; Shula Hebden-Lloyd, owner of the riding stables, who was married first to Mark Hebden, a solicitor, and then to Alistair Lloyd, a vet; her twin Kenton, who runs the village's pub with his wife Jolene; and the widowed Elizabeth Pargetter. Jill lives at Brookfield with David and Ruth, their children Pip, Josh and Ben, and Pip's daughter Rosie.
- The Aldridges lived at Home Farm for many years. Brian is portrayed as a money-driven agribusinessman. He and his late wife Jennifer have five children. Jennifer already had two when they married: Adam, a farmer married to chef Ian Craig, and Debbie, a farmer based in Hungary. Two were born into the marriage: Kate, with a family abandoned in South Africa, and Alice, divorced from farrier Chris Carter. Brian had a son, Ruairi, from one of his affairs. The family also includes Kate's daughter with Roy Tucker, Phoebe, and Jennifer's sister Lilian, who is in a relationship with Justin Elliott.
- The Bridge Farm Archers, Tony (brother of Lilian and the late Jennifer) and Pat, practise organic farming. Their operations include a farm shop, a farm café, a vegetable box scheme, and a dairy. The whole family is involved – Tony and Pat, their children Helen and Tom, and Tom's wife Natasha. Tony and Pat have five grandchildren: Johnny, the son of their deceased son John, Helen's sons Henry and Jack, and Tom's twin girls Nova and Seren.
- The Pargetters are landed gentry who run their stately home, Lower Loxley Hall, as a business. The family comprises Nigel Pargetter's widow Elizabeth (daughter of Phil and Jill Archer), and her twin children – a son, Freddie, and a daughter, Lily.
- The Grundys, formerly struggling tenant farmers, were brought to prominence in the late 1970s and early 1980s. Introduced as comic characters, they are now seen as doggedly battling adversity. The family includes Eddie, his wife Clarrie, their sons Will and Ed, and the sons' children.
- The Carters, Neil and Susan. Their son Chris was married to Alice Aldridge; their daughter Emma has successively married brothers Will and Ed Grundy.
- The Snells; Lynda, married to the long-suffering Robert, is the butt of many jokes, but a stalwart of village life.

== History ==
A five-episode pilot series started on Whit Monday, 29 May 1950, and continued throughout that week. It was created by Godfrey Baseley and was broadcast to the English Midlands in the Regional Home Service, as 'a farming Dick Barton'. Recordings were sent to London, and the BBC decided to commission the series for a longer national run. In the pilot the Archers owned Wimberton Farm, rather than Brookfield. Baseley subsequently edited The Archers for 22 years.

From 1 January 1951, five 15-minute episodes were transmitted each week, from Monday to Friday, at first on the BBC Light Programme and subsequently on the BBC Home Service (Radio 4 from 1 October 1967). In 1998 this changed to six 12½-minute episodes, from Sunday to Friday. Early afternoon repeats of the previous evening's episode began on 14 December 1964. The original scriptwriters were Geoffrey Webb and Edward J. Mason, who were also working on the nightly thriller series about the special agent Dick Barton. The popularity of his adventures partly inspired The Archers, which eventually took over Barton's evening slot. At first, however, the national launch placed the serial at the "terrible" time of 11.45 am, but it moved to Dick Barton's former slot of 6.45 pm from 2 April 1951. An omnibus edition of the week's episodes began on 5 January 1952.

Originally produced with collaborative input from the Ministry of Agriculture and Fisheries, The Archers was conceived as a means of disseminating information to farmers and smallholders to help increase productivity in the Postwar era of rationing and food shortages.

The Archers originally centred on the lives of three farmers: Dan Archer, farming efficiently with little cash, Walter Gabriel, farming inefficiently with little cash, and George Fairbrother, a wealthy businessman farming at a loss for tax purposes (which one could do in those days). The programme was hugely successful, winning the National Radio Awards' 'Most entertaining programme of the Year' award jointly with Take It from Here in 1954, and winning the award outright in 1955, in which year the audience was reported to have peaked at 20 million.

In the late 1950s, despite the growth of television and radio's consequent decline, the programme was still claiming 11 million listeners and was being transmitted in Canada, Australia and New Zealand. By the mid-1970s, however, the audience for the two daily broadcasts and the weekend omnibus combined was less than three million and in 1976 the BBC Radio Four Review Board twice considered axing the programme. The serial's woes at this time were seen to mirror the poor standing of radio drama in general, described as "a failure to fully shake off the conventions of non-realism which had prevailed in the 1940s and 1950s."

Programme chief Jock Gallagher, responsible for The Archers, described these as the serial's "dog days". Sweeping editorial reforms followed, included the introduction of women writers (there had been none before 1975), two of whom, Helen Leadbeater and Margaret Phelan, were credited with giving the programme a new definitive style of writing and content, although some listeners complained about their radical feminism.

In 1980 Julie Burchill commented that the women of Ambridge were no longer stuck with "the gallons of greengage jam old-guard male scriptwriters kept them occupied with for over twenty years", but were 'into post-natal depression and alcoholism on the way to self-discovery'. In the mid-1980s the Radio Four Review Board noted that scripts, directing and acting were "very good" and sometimes "better than ever". In August 1985 The Listener said that the programme's revival was "sustained by some of the best acting, direction and writing on radio."

Tony Shryane MBE was the programme's producer from 1 January 1951 to 19 January 1979. Vanessa Whitburn was the programme's editor from 1992 till 2013. Whitburn took service leave from March to July 2012, and John Yorke, a former executive producer of EastEnders, came in as acting editor. Yorke's arrival prompted charges that the programme was importing the values of EastEnders to Borsetshire, with fans and commentators complaining that characters were behaving unrealistically simply to generate conflict. This was denied by Yorke, who wrote that he agreed to take over "on one condition – that it stayed exactly as it was and that I didn't have to change anything."

Whitburn was succeeded as editor by Sean O'Connor in September 2013. In September 2016, Huw Kennair-Jones took over as editor, though O'Connor continued to oversee the Helen and Rob storyline until its conclusion. Kennair-Jones announced in October 2017 that he was to leave the BBC to work as commissioning editor for ITV. The short tenure of two successive Archers editors led to concerns of a trend of radio drama editing being seen as "training ground" for higher-paid positions in TV. Alison Hindell, the BBC's head of Audio Drama until October 2018, took over as acting editor before and after Kennair-Jones's time in charge. She effectively swapped roles with Jeremy Howe when she succeeded him as the BBC's commissioning editor for drama and fiction and he started as editor of the Archers in late August 2018.

Since 2007, The Archers has been available as a podcast.

Since Easter Sunday 1998, there have been six episodes a week, from Sunday to Friday, broadcast at around 19:03 following the news summary. Episodes are repeated the following day at 14:02, except the Friday evening episode, which repeats on Saturday at 14:45 (from 6 April 2024). The six episodes were re-run unabridged in the Sunday morning omnibus at 10:00. On Remembrance Sunday, the omnibus edition begins at the earlier time of 09:15. In March 2024, the BBC announced scheduling changes that would see the Sunday omnibus begin at 11.00.

=== Death of Grace Archer ===
One of the most controversial Archers episodes was broadcast on 22 September 1955, coinciding with the launch of the UK's first commercial television station. Phil and Grace Archer had been married just a few months earlier, and their blossoming relationship was the talk of the nation. However, searching for a story which would demonstrate real tragedy among increasingly unconvincing episode cliff-hangers, Godfrey Baseley decided that Grace would have to die. The scripts for the week commencing 19 September 1955 were written, recorded and broadcast on each day, with an "exercise in topicality" given as the explanation to the cast. On Thursday, listeners heard the sound effects of Grace trying to rescue Midnight, her horse, from a fire in the stable at Brookfield and the crash of a falling timber beam.

Whether the timing of the episode was a deliberate attempt to overshadow the opening night of the BBC's first commercial rival has been debated ever since. It was certainly planned some months in advance, but it may well be that the actual date of the death was changed during the scriptwriting stage to coincide with the launch of Associated-Rediffusion. Whether the timing was deliberate or not, the episode attracted widespread media attention, being reported by newspapers around the world.

This controversy has been parodied twice; in "The Bowmans", an episode of the television comedy programme Hancock, and in the play The Killing of Sister George and its 1968 film adaptation. On the 50th anniversary of ITV's launch, Ysanne Churchman, who played Grace, sent them a congratulatory card signed "Grace Archer".

In 1996, William Smethurst recounted a conversation with Baseley in which he reveals his real motivation for killing off Grace Archer: Churchman had been encouraging the other actors to join a trade union.

=== Cast longevity ===
The actor Norman Painting played Phil Archer continuously from the first trial series in 1950 until his death on 29 October 2009. His last Archers performance was recorded just two days before his death, and was broadcast on 22 November. He is cited in Guinness World Records as the longest-serving actor in a single soap opera. Under the pseudonym "Bruno Milna", Painting also wrote around 1,200 complete episodes, the last being the 10,000th episode.

June Spencer, who celebrated her 100th birthday in 2019, played Peggy Archer (later Woolley) in the pilot episode and continued in the role until 2022. Patricia Greene joined the cast in 1957 to play Jill Archer, which she continued to do until shortly before her death in 2026.

=== Sixtieth anniversary ===
The Archers reached its 60th anniversary on 1 January 2011; to mark this achievement a special half-hour episode was broadcast on Sunday 2 January, on BBC Radio 4 at 7pm. The episode had been advertised as containing events that would "shake Ambridge to the core". This phrase even gave rise to the initialism #SATTC trending on the website Twitter during that weekend as listeners speculated about what might happen, and then reported their views as the story unfolded.

The main events in the episode were Helen Archer giving birth to her son Henry and Nigel Pargetter falling to his death from the roof of Lower Loxley Hall. The latter unlikely event provoked interest in the frequency and causes of death in the series. In fact, although the incidence of accidental death and suicide is seven times the national average, the overall mortality rate in Ambridge is almost exactly what would be expected.

The demise of Nigel caused controversy among some listeners; a number of complaints variously expressed dismay at the death of a popular character, concerns over the manner of the dismissal of the actor, a belief that the promise to "shake Ambridge to the core" had been over-hyped, and criticism of the credibility of the script (for example, the duration of his plummeting cry caused the building's height to be calculated at considerably more than had been imagined); there was also a perceived unwillingness of the editorial team to engage with these listener complaints.

=== COVID-19 pandemic ===
Topical subjects have been added to the script, but this was not possible during the COVID-19 pandemic. Actors were initially recorded in their homes and included references to the pandemic from some of the characters sharing their private thoughts with the listener. From 4 May 2020 to 14 August 2021, because of COVID-19 pandemic restrictions, weekly programming was reduced to four episodes, omitting the episodes on Sunday and Friday. The Sunday omnibus was correspondingly reduced in length. After the broadcast of some pre-recorded episodes and the repeat of some classic episodes, new episodes were aired that had been recorded remotely, to a mixed reception. On 15 August 2021, the Sunday evening episode resumed regular broadcast, as did the Friday evening episode on 3 June 2022.

=== 'Final' episodes ===
On two occasions, special 'final' episodes of The Archers have been produced for the benefit of broadcasters outside the UK who had been running the series but were no longer willing or able to continue. The first was in 1969, for stations in Canada, Kenya and Hong Kong. The second occasion was in 1982, when rising costs meant Radio New Zealand could no longer afford to continue running the series, and a concluding episode was written and produced for them to end The Archers with in September that year.

== Themes ==
The programme has tackled many serious, contemporary social issues: rural drug addiction; rape, including rape in marriage; inter-racial relationships; direct action against genetically modified crops and badger culling; family break-ups; civil partnerships; and a family being threatened by a gang of farm thieves. There has been criticism from conservative commentators, such as Peter Hitchens in 1999, that the series has become a vehicle for liberal and left-wing values and agendas, with characters behaving out of character to achieve those goals. However, one of the show's charms is to make much out of everyday, small concerns, such as the possible closure of the village shop, the loss and rediscovery of a pair of spectacles, competitive marmalade-making, or nonsense such as a 'spile troshing' competition, rather than the large-scale and improbable events that form the plots of many soap operas. Godfrey Baseley was quoted in The Independent as objecting to the homosexuality in the programme, saying, "It is disgusting ... It is distasteful because being gay is such a minority interest. Country folk don't do that kind of thing. They have sex the proper way."

According to some of the actors, and confirmed in the writings of Godfrey Baseley, in its early days the show was used as a conduit for educational announcements from the Ministry of Agriculture, one actor reading an announcement almost verbatim to another. Direct involvement of the government ended in 1972. The show has reacted within a day to agricultural emergencies, such as outbreaks of foot and mouth disease which affect farmers nationwide if livestock movements are restricted.

=== Topicality ===
Unlike some soap operas, The Archers sometimes portrays events that take place on the date of broadcast, which allows topical subjects to be included. Real-life events which can be readily predicted are often written into the script, such as the annual Oxford Farming Conference and the FIFA World Cup. On some occasions, scenes recorded at these events are planned and edited into episodes shortly before transmission.

More challengingly for the production team, some significant but unforeseen events require scenes to be rewritten and rerecorded at short notice, such as the death of Princess Margaret (particularly poignant because she had appeared as herself on the programme), the World Trade Center attacks, and the 7 July 2005 London bombings. The events and implications of the 2001 foot-and-mouth crisis required many "topical inserts" and the rewriting of several storylines.

In January 2012, Oliver Sterling, owner of Grange Farm, together with the son of his tenant, Ed Grundy, elected to vaccinate the badgers on their farm in an attempt to prevent the spread of bovine tuberculosis. The plotline came within weeks of the government confirming a badger cull trial.

It was announced on 29 March 2020 that the programme would include references to the COVID-19 pandemic from 4 May onwards.

The death of Queen Elizabeth II on 8 September 2022 was discussed by Lynda Snell and Lilian Bellamy as the first section of the episode broadcast on Sunday 11 September.

== Music ==
=== Theme tune ===
The theme tune of The Archers is called "Barwick Green" and is a maypole dance from the suite My Native Heath, written in 1924 by the Yorkshire composer Arthur Wood. The Sunday omnibus broadcast of The Archers starts with a more rustic, accordion-arranged rendition by The Yetties. The theme for BBC Radio 4 Extra's The Archers spinoff, Ambridge Extra, is a version arranged by Bellowhead.

A library music recording of Barwick Green was used for the pilot and during the early years of the national version, because a bid by Godfrey Baseley to have a special theme composed had been turned down on the grounds of cost, put at (then) £250–£300. However, once the serial had become undeniably established, a new recording of Barwick Green was authorised and performed by the BBC Midland Light Orchestra on 24 March 1954. This mono recording was accompanied by four movements entitled "A Village Suite", composed by Kenneth Pakeman to complement Barwick Green. Excerpts from these movements were used for a time as bridging music between scenes. The 1954 recordings were never made available to the public and their use was restricted even inside the BBC, partly because of an agreement with the Musicians' Union.

In 1992, the theme was re-recorded in stereo, retaining the previous arrangements. The venue was Symphony Hall, Birmingham, the conductor Ron Goodwin, the producer David Welsby, and the sound mixer Norman McLeod. The slightly different sound mixing and more leisurely tempo reportedly led some listeners to consider the new version inferior, specifically that it lacked "brio", although the BBC publicised the fact that the orchestra contained some of the musicians who had played in the previous recording, including Harold Rich (piano) and Norman Parker (percussion).

Robert Robinson once compared the tune to "the genteel abandon of a lifelong teetotaller who has suddenly taken to drink". On April Fool's Day 2004 both The Independent and The Today Programme claimed that BBC executives had commissioned composer Brian Eno to record an electronic version of "Barwick Green" as a replacement for the current theme, while comedian Billy Connolly included in his act the joke that the theme was so typically British that it should be the national anthem of the United Kingdom.

In 2009, comedian Rainer Hersch conducted the Philharmonia Orchestra in a performance of the theme, live from the Royal Festival Hall to a listening BBC Radio 3 audience in an attempt to confuse them. He then went on to show how similar it is to "Montagues and Capulets" – "Dance of the Knights" – from Romeo and Juliet by Sergei Prokofiev, claiming that this was a result of Russian spies going through the BBC's rubbish bins looking for the scripts.

=== Serious events ===
At times, a cliffhanger involving the death of a major character or a disaster was marked by the replacement of the traditional closing theme with the final, dramatic section of Barwick Green, which included trombones, cymbals and the closing bars of the signature tune and was known as the "doom music" to some fan groups. This tradition has been dropped, events such as the death of Nigel Pargetter being followed by the normal closing music despite the gravity of the incident. This has irritated some followers, who consider the jollity of the normal segment inappropriate in such circumstances.

A brief extract from The Dream of Gerontius was played following the death of Phil Archer. When John Archer died, no music was played.

There was a nod to The Archers in the opening ceremony of the Olympic Games in London on 27 July 2012, where the theme tune was played at the beginning of a segment celebrating British culture: the sound of a radio could be heard being tuned in as Barwick Green was played.

== Casting ==
=== Actors ===
The Archers actors are not held on retainers and usually work on episodes for a few days a month. Because storylines concentrate on a particular group for a period, in any one week, the episodes include approximately 20–30 speaking characters out of a cast of about 60. Most of the cast do acting work on other projects and can disappear for long periods if they have commitments such as films or television series. Tamsin Greig plays Debbie Aldridge and has appeared on many television series such as Green Wing, Love Soup, Black Books and Episodes, so Debbie manages a farm in Hungary and her visits to Ambridge are infrequent. Felicity Jones played Emma Carter from the age of 15 but after a period of studying at Wadham College, Oxford, she gave up the role to move into television and cinema.

Some of the actors, when not playing their characters, earn their money through different jobs altogether. Charlotte Connor, when not playing Susan Carter (credited as Charlotte Martin), works full-time as a senior research psychologist at the Birmingham and Solihull Mental Health Foundation; her office is a short walk from BBC Birmingham, and thus she is able to fit her work around recordings. Graham Blockey, who played Robert Snell before his death in 2022, worked until 2017 as a full-time general practitioner in Surrey, commuting to and from BBC Birmingham at weekends and on his days off. He kept his role secret from his patients, for fear of losing their respect, until his retirement from medicine in March 2017. Felicity Finch (Ruth Archer) works as a BBC journalist and has travelled on a number of occasions to Afghanistan. Ian Pepperell (Roy Tucker), before his death at the age of 53 on 22 December 2023, managed a pub in the New Forest.

=== Current cast ===
Actor	Character	Years active
Carole Boyd	Fiona Watson	1967–1969
Carole Boyd	Lynda Snell	1986–present
Brian Hewlett	Neil Carter	1973–present
Patricia Gallimore	Pat Archer	1974–2019, 2021–present
Charles Collingwood	Brian Aldridge	1975–present
Trevor Harrison	Eddie Grundy	1979–present
Heather Bell	Clarrie Grundy	1979–1985, 2013–present
Tim Bentinck	David Archer	1982–present
Charlotte Martin	Susan Carter	1982–present
Alison Dowling	Elizabeth Pargetter	1984–present
Felicity Finch	Ruth Archer	1987–present
Philip Molloy	Will Grundy	1988–1990, 1992–present
Susie Riddell	Kate Aldridge	1990–1994
Susie Riddell	Tracy Horrobin	2011–2013, 2017–present
Souad Faress	Usha Franks	1994–2018, 2021–present
Buffy Davis	Jolene Archer	1996–present
Michael Lumsden	Alistair Lloyd	1998–present
Annabelle Dowler	Kirsty Miller	1999–present
Louiza Patikas	Helen Archer	2000–present
Richard Attlee	Kenton Archer	2000–present
Barry Farrimond	Ed Grundy	2000–present
Joanna Van Kampen	Fallon Rogers	2000–present
Michael Cochrane	Oliver Sterling	2000–present
Sunny Ormonde	Lilian Bellamy	2001–present
Ryan Kelly	Jazzer McCreary	2001–present
Hollie Chapman	Alice Carter	2001–present
Andrew Wincott	Adam Macy	2003–present
John Telfer	Rev Alan Franks	2003–present
Stephen Kennedy	Ian Craig	2003–present
Helen Longworth	Hannah Riley	2008–2009, 2018–2020, 2022–present
Jon Glover	Martyn Gibson	2009–2014, 2018–present
Emerald O'Hanrahan	Emma Grundy	2010–present
James Cartwright	Harrison Burns	2014–present
Daisy Badger	Pip Archer	2014–present
David Troughton	Tony Archer	2014–present
Simon Williams	Justin Elliott	2014–present
William Troughton	Tom Archer	2014–present
Perdita Avery	Kate Madikane	2014–present
Nick Barber	Rex Fairbrother	2015–present
Isobel Middleton	Anna Tregorran	2016, 2018, 2023, 2026–present
Lucy Fleming	Miranda Elliott	2016, 2017, 2024–present
Toby Laurence	Freddie Pargetter	2016–present
Katie Redford	Lily Pargetter	2017–present
Wilf Scolding	Christopher Carter	2017–present
Mali Harries	Natasha Archer	2018–present
Ben Norris	Ben Archer	2018–present
Arthur Hughes	Ruairi Donovan	2018–present
Paul Copley	Leonard Berry	2019, 2021–present
Paul Venables	Jakob Hakansson	2019–present
Tony Turner	Vince Casey	2019–present
Jackie Lye	Joy Horville	2019–present
Rebecca Fuller	Beth Casey	2021–2022, 2026–present
Lucy Speed	Stella Pryor	2021–present
Clare Perkins	Denise Metcalf	2021–2024, 2026–present
Madeleine Leslay	Chelsea Horrobin	2021–present
Angus Stobie	George Grundy	2022–present
Taylor Uttley	Brad Horrobin	2022–present
Martin Barrass	Mick Fadmoor	2022–present
Joshua Riley	Paul Mack	2022–present
Bonnie Baddoo	Lottie Summers	2022–present
Blayke Darby	Henry Archer	2023–present
Yasmin Wilde	Azra Malik	2023–present
Michael Bertenshaw	Robert Snell	2024–present
Priyasasha Kumari	Zainab Malik	2024–present
Krish Bassi	Khalil Malik	2024–present
Asif Khan	Akram Malik	2025–present
Olivia Bernstone	Amber Gordon	2025–present
Ellie Pawsey	Esme Mulligan	2025–present
David Sterne	Bert Horrobin	2026–present
Mollie Kruczek	Keira Grundy	2026–present
Sam Wilkinson	Josh Archer	2026–present

=== Former cast ===
Actor	Character	Years active
Rosalind Adams	Clarrie Grundy	1988–2012
Eric Allan	Bert Fry	1997–2020
Joan Anstey	Dorothy Sinclair	1961–1965
Andonis James Anthony	Russ Jones	2018–2022
Gareth Armstrong	Mike Tucker	1973
Gareth Armstrong	Harry Booker	1974–1983
Gareth Armstrong	Sean Myerson	1996–2000
Bob Arnold	Tom Forrest	1951–1997
Pal Aron	Iftikar Shah	2012–2013
Scott Arthur	Rhys Williams	2011–2013
Jack Ashton	Harry Chilcott	2023–2024
Adam Astill	Miles Titchener	2023
Rachel Atkins	Vicky Tucker	2009–2015
Yves Aubert	Jean-Paul Aubert	1988–1992, 1994, 1995, 1997, 1998, 2000–2002
John Baddeley	Colin Drury	1967, 1969, 1970, 1973–1977
Noreen Baddiley	Mary Thomas	1953–1956, 1958, 1960–1963, 1965, 1967
Ronald Baddiley	George Lawson-Hope	1951–1956
Ronald Baddiley	Harvey Grenville	1961–1966
Annette Badland	Hazel Woolley	2014, 2015, 2021–2022
Heather Barrett	Dorothy Adamson	1975–1988
Sam Barriscale	John Archer	1987–1998
Godfrey Baseley	Brigadier Winstanley	1967–1971
Patricia Bendall	Dawn Kingsley	1961–1966
Judy Bennett	Shula Hebden Lloyd	1971–2022, 2023–2024
Ballard Berkeley	Colonel Frederick Danby	1980–1987
Gwen Berryman	Doris Archer	1951–1980
Rhys Bevan	Toby Fairbrother	2015–2023, 2025
Sudha Bhuchar	Usha Gupta	1991–1993
Peter Biddle	Peter Stevens	1968–1972
Graham Blockey	Robert Snell	1986–2022
John Bott	Paddy Redmond	1965–1967
John Bott	John Tregorran	1981–1984
Leslie Bowmar	George Fairbrother	1951–1958
Margot Boyd	Marjorie Antrobus	1984–2004
Kellie Bright	Kate Madikane	1995–2002, 2005–2007, 2009–2012
Eleanor Bron	Carol Tregorran	2014–2018
Ian Brooker	Wayne Foley	1999–2004, 2011, 2012
Nigel Caliburn	Nigel Pargetter	1987–1988
Heather Canning	Anne Grenville	1961–1965
Heather Canning	Valerie Woolley	1972–1973
Nigel Carrington	Nigel Pargetter	1988–1989
Richard Carrington	Richard Adamson	1973–1988
Nigel Carrivick	David Archer	1980–1981
Jasper Carrott	Sykesy	2023
Anne Chatterley	Sally Stobeman	1961–1962, 1965–1967
Cian Cheesbrough	Josh Archer	2010–2013
Scott Cherry	Martin Lambert	1984–1985
Ysanne Churchman	Grace Archer	1952–1955
Ysanne Churchman	Mary Pound	1971–1983
Dan Ciotkowski	Jamie Perks	2010–2014
Lorraine Coady	Hayley Tucker	2006–2016
Michael Collins	Mike Daly	1954–1955
Michael Collins	Ken Pound	1971–1973
Alaric Cotter	Simon Parker	1976–1978
Sara Coward	Caroline Sterling	1979–2016
Jan Cox	Hazel Woolley	1983–1985
Pamela Craig	Betty Tucker	1974–2004
Monte Crick	Dan Archer	1960–1969
Anne Cullen	Carol Tregorran	1954–1984
Jennifer Daley	Amy Franks	2012, 2013, 2021, 2022
Mary Dalley	Pru Forrest	1956–1979, 1982
Carol Lynn Davies	Jennifer Archer	1962–1963
Joy Davies	Helen Fairbrother	1952–1959, 1974
Lucy Davis	Hayley Tucker	1995–2004
Stavros Demetraki	Dane Farnes	2025
Richard Derrington	Mark Hebden	1980–1994
Alan Devereux	Sid Perks	1963–2009
John Dexter	Geoff Bryden	1955–1956
Hugh Dickson	Guy Pemberton	1993–1996
Tommy Duggan	Fred Barratt	1960–1970
Leslie Dunn	Paul Johnson	1954–1977
Kim Durham	Matt Crawford	1997–2014, 2017
Ryan Early	Lee Bryce	2018–2023, 2025
Michael Fenton Stevens	Paul Morgan	2010, 2012–2013
Marc Finn	Greg Turner	1998–2004
Jack Firth	Freddie Pargetter	2010–2014
Denis Folwell	Jack Archer	1950–1971
John Franklyn-Robbins	Bill Slater	1951
John Franklyn-Robbins	Dick Raymond	1951
John Franklyn-Robbins	Mike Daly	1952
William Gaminara	Richard Locke	1992–1998, 2015–2016
Philip Garston-Jones	Jack Woolley	1962–1979
Tom Gibbons	Johnny Phillips	2014–2021
Joyce Gibbs	Christine Johnson	1963–1967
Joyce Gibbs	Heather Pritchard	1999–2003, 2007–2008, 2010, 2013
Chris Gittins	Walter Gabriel	1953–1988
Frances Graham	Helen Archer	1987–1989, 1992
Tom Graham	Tom Archer	1997–2014
James Grant	Andrew Sinclair	1963–1967, 1973–1975
Garard Green	Ken Pound	1973–1977
Patricia Greene	Jill Archer	1957–2025
Tamsin Greig	Debbie Aldridge	1991–2004, 2007–2013, 2015, 2016, 2018, 2020, 2023, 2026
Monica Grey	Grace Fairbrother	1951–1952
Dan Hagley	Darrell Makepeace	2012–2013
Stephen Hancock	Laurence Lovell	1996–2000
Peter Harlowe	Roger Travers-Macy	1991–1992, 1994
Mollie Harris	Martha Woodford	1970–1995
Edgar Harrison	Dan Archer	1969–1982
George Hart	Jethro Larkin	1967–1987
Steven Hartley	Erik Hakansson	2023, 2026
Julia Hills	Annabelle Scrivener	2007–2014, 2018, 2025
Andy Hockley	Philip Moss	2017–2021
Jack Holloway	Tony Stobeman	1957, 1962, 1965
Jack Holloway	Ralph Bellamy	1964–1977, 1979
Freda Hooper	Jennifer Archer	1959
Courtney Hope	Mrs Turvey	1954–1958, 1960–1974
Will Howard	Dan Hebden Lloyd	2013–2016, 2018, 2022
Kay Hudson	Mabel Larkin	1957–1973
Roger Hume	John Tregorran	1979–1981
Roger Hume	Bert Fry	1988–1996
Jasmine Hyde	Leonie Snell	2009, 2011–2015, 2017, 2020, 2025
Angus Imrie	Josh Archer	2014–2026
Ronny Jhutti	Adil Shah	2022–2024
Ann Johnson	Valerie Trentham	1952–1953, 1955–1956, 1964
Alex Jones	Clive Horrobin	1991, 1993, 1997, 2003, 2004, 2011, 2024, 2026
Basil Jones	John Tregorran	1953–1965, 1976–1977
Carolyn Jones	Ursula Titchener	2014–2017
Felicity Jones	Emma Grundy	2000–2009
Haydn Jones	Joe Grundy	1977–1984
Charlotte Jordan	Amber Gordon	2025
Edward Kelsey	Joe Grundy	1985–2019
Bryan Kendrick	Nigel Burton	1961–1966, 1968
Ann Kindred	Sally Johnson	1954
Ann Kindred	Sheila Trevelyan	1958
Will Kings	Ben White	1953–1955
Graeme Kirk	Kenton Archer	1988–1993, 1997–1998
Simon Lack	John Tregorran	1975–1976
Margaret Lane	Lilian Archer	1959
Rosemary Leach	Ellen Rogers	1994, 1996, 1998
Jenny Lee	Valerie Woolley	1966–1968
Caroline Lennon	Siobhan Donovan	1999–2003, 2007, 2014, 2016, 2020
Moir Leslie	Sophie Barlowe	1985–1987
Moir Leslie	Janet Fisher	1996–2003
Geoffrey Lewis	David Cavendish	1955–1956
Geoffrey Lewis	Geoff Bryden	1958, 1961–1965
Geoffrey Lewis	Stanley Cooper	1972–1973
Robert Lister	Lewis Carmichael	2000, 2001, 2004, 2008, 2010–2013
Harry Littlewood	Ronnie Beddoes	1966–1970
Crawford Logan	Matthew Thorogood	1986–1990
Connie M'Gadzah	Lucas Madikane	2001, 2002, 2017
Rina Mahoney	Jess Myers	2013–2016, 2023
Valborg Maitland	Jennifer Archer	1960–1962
Pamela Mant	Christine Archer	1950–1953
Julia Mark	Nora McAuley	1966–1977
Elizabeth Marlowe	Lilian Bellamy	1961–1977, 1979–1982, 1989–1991
Nan Marriott-Watson	Doris Archer	1950
Jeremy Mason	Roger Travers-Macy	1965–1972
Jamila Massey	Satya Khanna	1996, 1998, 1999, 2003–2005, 2008
Mogali Masuku	Noluthando Madikane	2017–2018, 2023
Fiona Mathieson	Clarrie Grundy	1985–1987
Robert Mawdesley	Walter Gabriel	1950–1953
Jack May	Nelson Gabriel	1956, 1962, 1963, 1965, 1966, 1968, 1970–1972, 1975, 1977, 1979–1997
Roger May	James Bellamy	2009, 2011–2014, 2017
Neil McCaul	Matthew Thorogood	1986
Michael McClain	Hugo Barnaby	1968–1971, 1974
Betty McDowall	Laura Archer	1978–1985
Duncan McIntyre	Angus McLaren	1964–1965, 1969–1971, 1973
Malcolm McKee	Graham Ryder	1997–1998, 2000, 2003, 2008, 2009, 2014, 2023
Tim Meats	Robin Stokes	1991–1995
Frank Middlemass	Dan Archer	1982–1986
Terry Molloy	Mike Tucker	1974–2015, 2021–2022
Helen Monks	Pip Archer	2005–2014
Philip Morant	John Tregorran	1965–1975
Lucy Morris	Phoebe Aldridge	2010–2022, 2025
Hayward Morse	Lester Nicholson	1968–1970
Ted Moult	Bill Insley	1983–1986
Celia Nelson	Sharon Phillips	1989–1994, 1997–1998, 2011–2012, 2014
Hilary Newcombe	Polly Perks	1964–1981
Hedli Niklaus	Eva Coverdale	1978–1981
Hedli Niklaus	Kathy Perks	1984–2015, 2022
Harry Oakes	Dan Archer	1950–1960
Jonathan Owen	Terry Barford	1980–1984, 1989
Philip Owen	Tony Archer	1963–1967
Norman Painting	Phil Archer	1950–2009
Judy Parfitt	Janet Tregorran	1962–1963
Leslie Parker	Clive Lawson-Hope	1952–1954
Bill Payne	Ned Larkin	1956–1968
Ian Pepperell	Roy Tucker	1995–2023
Arnold Peters	Len Thomas	1953–1958, 1960–1967
Arnold Peters	David Latimer	1968–1973
Arnold Peters	Jack Woolley	1980–2011
Anne-Marie Piazza	Annette Turner	2009–2010
Gareth Pierce	Gavin Moss	2019–2021, 2024
Molly Pipe	Mia Grundy	2019, 2021–2025
Angela Piper	Jennifer Aldridge	1963–2022
Sion Probert	Wayne Tucson	2009–2010
Arnold Ridley	Doughy Hood	1956–1958, 1961–1970, 1973
Graham Rigby	Zebedee Tring	1961, 1962, 1964, 1966–1974
Graham Rigby	Bert Gibbs	1975–1977
Graham Roberts	George Barford	1973–2004
Eddie Robinson	Simon Cooper	1951–1956
Thelma Rogers	Elsie Catcher	1953
Thelma Rogers	Peggy Archer	1953–1962
Anneika Rose	Anisha Jayakoday	2016–2018
Alan Rothwell	Jimmy Grange	1957–1960, 1963
John Rowe	Jim Lloyd	2007–2025
Will Sanderson-Thwaite	Christopher Carter	2004–2014
Lesley Saweard	Christine Barford	1953–1962, 1968–2019
Felix Scott	Charlie Thomas	2014–2016
Graham Seed	Nigel Pargetter	1983–1986, 1992–2011
Pauline Seville	Mrs Perkins	1951–1959, 1963, 1965–1990
Michael Shaw	Charles Grenville	1959–1964
Michael Shelford	Harry Mason	2010–2012
Norman Shelley	Colonel Frederick Danby	1976–1980
Amy Shindler	Brenda Tucker	1999–2015, 2024
Eri Shuka	Elona Makepeace	2011–2013
Alison Skilbeck	Polly Perks	1981–1982
Colin Skipp	Tony Archer	1967–2013
Mia Soteriou	Carol Tregorran	2026
Ania Sowinski	Lexi Viktorova	2017–2019
June Spencer	Peggy Woolley	1950–1953, 1962–2022
June Spencer	Rita Flynn	1951–1953, 1956–1958, 1961–1962
Rosie Stancliffe	Rochelle Horville	2024–2025
Leon Tanner	Jim Coverdale	1979–1981, 1997
Gerald Turner	Gregory Salt	1964–1972
David Vann	Dave Barry	1982–1990
Rupert Vansittart	Lawrence Harrington	2025
Anne Louise Wakefield	Jackie Woodstock	1980–1983
Timothy Watson	Rob Titchener	2013–2017, 2023
Tracy Jane White	Lucy Perks	1982–1992
Peter Wilde	Reggie Trentham	1952–1957
Charles Williams	Haydn Evans	1972–1979
Esma Wilson	Joan Burton	1962–1966, 1968
Gwenda Wilson	Laura Archer	1962–1977
Mary Wimbush	Jane Maxwell	1951
Mary Wimbush	Lady Isabel Lander	1969–1970
Mary Wimbush	Julia Pargetter	1992–2005
Peter Wingfield	Simon Pemberton	1995–1997
George Woolley	Joby Woodford	1969–1978
Becky Wright	Nic Grundy	2007–2018
Nicola Wright	Rosemary Tarrant	1986, 1989–1990, 2001

=== Cameo appearances ===
Many famous people have made cameo appearances on the programme:

- Princess Margaret and the Duke of Westminster appeared in 1984 in connection with a fashion show to commemorate the centenary of the NSPCC.
- Dame Judi Dench made an appearance as the (hitherto usually silent) Pru Forrest in 1989 for the 10,000th episode. Terry Wogan was featured and Esther Rantzen was responsible for the sound effects.
- Radio presenter John Peel appeared as himself in 1991.
- Gardener Alan Titchmarsh judged Ambridge's entries in the National Gardens Scheme open gardens competition in May 2003.
- Radio presenter Chris Moyles appeared in June 2004 as a random customer – and suspected National Pub of the Year judge – in The Bull.
- Comedian Griff Rhys Jones appeared as himself in July 2004, when he was drafted into Lynda Snell's campaign to restore the Cat and Fiddle pub.
- Zandra Rhodes played herself in an episode in September 2006 in connection with a charity fashion show.
- Robert Winston appeared as a fertility specialist consulted by Hayley and Roy Tucker in January and February 2007.
- Mike Gatting appeared in September 2007 at the centre of a misunderstanding between Sid and Jolene Perks during the npower Village Cup final at Lord's Cricket Ground.
- Crime novelist Colin Dexter made a cameo appearance in 2010.
- Camilla, Duchess of Cornwall (now Queen Camilla), appeared on 16 February 2011 in connection with the National Osteoporosis Society's 25th anniversary and with the show's 60th anniversary.
- In 2011, a recording of the show Gardeners' Question Time was followed by a special recording session in which Archers characters, notably Brian Aldridge, took part asking questions of the regular panellists while sitting with the audience.
- Bradley Wiggins appeared in an April 2014 episode, presenting prizes at the Ambridge Sport Relief Rough and Tumble event Challenge.
- Kirstie Allsopp appeared in July 2014 to open the village fete.
- In August 2014, the Pet Shop Boys were last-minute headliners at the music festival Loxfest.
- Anneka Rice has appeared twice in Ambridge, in March 1993 and March 2016.
- In September 2016, in an hour-long episode concluding a highly publicised storyline in which Helen Titchener had stabbed her abusive husband Rob, some notable names guest-starred as jury members, including Dame Eileen Atkins, Catherine Tate and Nigel Havers.
- In August 2021, Jackie Weaver, a council officer in the news, appeared as herself, judging a scarecrow competition in the village, and warning off some protestors.
- In August 2022, Toyah Willcox appeared as herself in two episodes, enjoying Bridge Farm cheese at Cotstravaganza festival and buying a piece of Will Grundy's pottery at the Ambridge village fete.
- In May 2023, Rylan Clark appeared as himself, to judge the village's Eurovision Variety Show.
- Others who have made appearances include Humphrey Lyttelton (1956), Angela Rippon (1980), Britt Ekland (1992), Dame Edna Everage (1998), Antony Gormley (2009), Ruth Jones (2025) and Sophie, Duchess of Edinburgh (2026).

== Fan clubs ==
Two organisations dedicated to the programme were established in the 1990s. Archers Addicts was the official body, run by members of the cast. The club had five thousand members and an online shop where Archers memorabilia was sold under licence. It closed as a club on 31 December 2013 but still has a Facebook page and a Twitter feed. Archers Anarchists was formed some time later, objecting to the "castist" assumptions propagated by the BBC, and claiming that the characters are real.

The usenet newsgroup uk.media.radio.archers (referred to as UMRA by its users, who call themselves umrats) has been running since 1995. Its users include experts on subjects covered by the programme, such as the many aspects of farming, the running of small businesses, and bell ringing; lengthy discussions ensue – as well as coverage of light-hearted matters and plot speculation. Various gatherings of umrats occur, including a series of about ten annual barbecues. The first was attended by Carole Boyd (Lynda Snell). They have included participants from Europe and the Americas. The group has nicknames for most of the regular Archers characters, such as S'aint for Shula. Perhaps because it was initially more accessible in academia, the discussions can be quite detailed, though UMRA considers itself to be a friendly and welcoming group, where in particular flamewars and the like are not welcome. Despite the general decline of usenet with the advent of trendier media such as Facebook and Twitter, UMRA remains a very active newsgroup compared to many. Its one-time T-shirts and mugs bore the legend (in yellow on "Barwick Green", of course) "An everyday story of internet folk", in humorous reference to the programme's initial billing.

The Academic Archers, founded in 2016, is a community of fans who share an academic approach to the programme. It organises an annual conference at which papers are presented which draw on academic expertise along with enjoyment. Papers from these have been published as The Archers in Fact and Fiction: Academic Analyses of Life in Rural Borsetshire (2016, Peter Lang: ISBN 9781787071193), Custard, Culverts and Cake (2017, Emerald: ISBN 9781787432864 and Gender, Sex and Gossip: Women in The Archers (2019, Emerald: ISBN 9781787699489 ) The group aims to be "curious, generous and joyful".

There are four weekly fan podcasts about The Archers: All About The Archers, DumTeeDum, The Cider Shed and Ambridge on the Couch.

== Derivative works ==
=== Books and audiobooks ===
==== Reference works ====
- Forever Ambridge: 25 Years of The Archers (1975) by Norman Painting. ASIN B0012UT8XM
- The Archers: The First Thirty Years, compiled by William Smethurst (1980). ISBN 0-413-47830-0
- The Archers: The Official Companion by William Smethurst (1985). ISBN 0-297-78715-2
- The Book of The Archers (1994) by Patricia Greene, Charles Collingwood and Hedli Niklaus. ISBN 0-7181-3849-X
- Jennifer Aldridge's Archers Cookbook by Angela Piper (1994). ISBN 0-7153-0141-1
- The Archers: The True Story (1996) by William Smethurst. ISBN 1-85833-620-1
- The Archers: The Official Inside Story by Vanessa Whitburn (1996). ISBN 1-85227-660-6
- The Archers' Pantry: Jennifer Aldridge by Angela Piper (1997). ISBN 0-091-85407-5
- The Archers Anarchists' A–Z: An Unofficial and Utterly Outrageous Guide by Ian Sanderson (1998). ISBN 0-7522-2442-5
- The Archers Annual 2000 by Kate Willmott and Hedli Niklaus. ISBN 0-563-38415-8
- The Archers Annual 2001 by Kate Willmott and Hedli Niklaus. ISBN 0-563-53716-7
- The Archers Encyclopaedia (2001) by Joanna Toye and Adrian Flynn, published to coincide with the 50th anniversary of The Archers. ISBN 0-563-53718-3
- Who's Who in The Archers 2008 by Keri Davies. ISBN 1-84607-326-X
- Who's Who in The Archers 2011 by Graham Harvey. ISBN 978-1-849-90015-7
- Jennifer Aldridge's Archers Cookbook by Angela Piper (2009). ISBN 0-7153-3338-0
- The Archers Miscellany (2010) by Joanna Toye. ISBN 978-1-84607-754-8
- The Road to Ambridge (2010) by June Spencer. ISBN 978-1-907532-25-2
- The Archers Archives (2010) by Simon Frith & Chris Arnot. ISBN 978-1-84990-013-3
- Borsetshire Life (2011). The county magazine. ISBN 978-1-902685-14-4. See borsetshire-life.
- The Ambridge Chronicles by Joanna Toye and Karen Farrington (2013). ISBN 978-1-84990-577-0
- For the Love of The Archers: An Unofficial Companion by Beth Miller (2015). ISBN 978-1-84953-773-5

==== Novelisations ====
- The Archers of Ambridge by Geoffrey Webb and Edward J. Mason (1954)
- The Archers Intervene by Geoffrey Webb and Edward J. Mason (1956)
- Ambridge Summer by Keith Miles (1975). ISBN 0-85523-065-7
- The Archers by Jock Gallagher
  - Doris Archer's Diary (1971). ISBN 0-563-12118-1
  - The Archers: To the Victor the Spoils (1988). ISBN 0-563-20599-7
  - The Archers: Return to Ambridge (1988). ISBN 0-563-20606-3
  - The Archers: Borchester Echoes (1988). ISBN 0-563-20607-1
  - The Archers: Omnibus Edition (1988). ISBN 0-563-36001-1
- Tom Forrest's Country Calendar (1978), compiled by Charles Lefeaux. ISBN 0-563-1741-10
- Ambridge: An English Village Through the Ages by William Smethurst (1981). ISBN 0-413-50170-1
- Dan Archer: The Ambridge Years by William Smethurst and Anthony Parkin (1984). ISBN 0-7181-2437-5
- Shula's Story by Joanna Toye (1995). ISBN 0-563-38703-3
- Lynda Snell's Heritage of Ambridge by Carole Boyd (1997). ISBN 185227-658-4
- The Ambridge Chronicles by Joanna Toye
  - The Archers 1951–1967: Family Ties (1998). ISBN 0-563-38397-6
  - The Archers 1968–1986: Looking for Love (1999). ISBN 0-563-55125-9
  - The Archers 1987–2000: Back to the Land (2000). ISBN 0-563-53701-9
  - The Archers 1951–1967: Family Ties (1998, audiobook, narrated by Miriam Margolyes). ISBN 0-563-55714-1
  - The Archers 1968–1986: Looking for Love (1999, audiobook, narrated by Stella Gonet). ISBN 0-563-55813-X
  - The Archers 1987–2000: Back to the Land (2000, audiobook, narrated by Stephanie Cole). ISBN 0-563-55818-0
- In 1975, Tandem published a prequel novel about Ambridge in the early 1900s
  - Spring at Brookfield by Brian Hayles (1975). ISBN 978-0-426-16520-0
- Jennifer's Diary by Joanna Toye (2003). ISBN 0-563-48767-4
- The Archers: Ambridge at War by Catherine Miller (2020). ISBN 978-1-4711-9548-8

==== Published audio episodes ====
- Vintage Archers
  - Vintage Archers: Volume 1 (1988). ISBN 0-563-22586-6
  - Vintage Archers: Volume 2 (1988). ISBN 0-563-22704-4
  - Vintage Archers: Volume 3 (1998). ISBN 0-563-55740-0 (Contains several "lost episodes" which have been digitally restored.)
  - The Archers: The Wedding. Jack and Peggy tie the knot
  - Vintage Archers: Volumes 1–3 (2001). ISBN 0-563-38281-3
- Ambridge Affairs
  - Ambridge Affairs: Love Triangles (2007). ISBN 1-4056-7733-3
  - Ambridge Affairs: Heartache at Home Farm (2007). ISBN 1-4056-8785-1

==== Maps ====
In addition to books and audiobooks, purported maps of Ambridge and Borsetshire have been published.

=== Documentaries ===
The BBC occasional arts series Arena has featured The Archers on several occasions:

- Series 31, episodes 1, 2 and 3, first broadcast on 1, 2 an4 4 January 2006.
- Series 32, episode 1, first broadcast on BBC Four on 1 January 2007. Narrated by Stephen Fry, and included interviews with current actors and scriptwriters on the occasion of the 15,000th episode.
- Series 33, episode 8, "The Original Archers" (first broadcast 4 October 2007), was a visualisation of the earliest existing episode of The Archers from the BBC archives – 11 March 1952 – using archive footage to recreate the period.

=== Ambridge Extra ===
BBC Radio 4 Extra ran an occasional short supplement, Ambridge Extra, between 2011 and 2013, featuring characters away from the Ambridge environs. Series 1 and 2 had 26 episodes and series 3, 4 and 5 had 20. The reason offered for non-renewal was limited resources.

=== Parallel works ===
In 1994, the BBC World Service began broadcasting in Afghanistan Naway Kor, Naway Jwand ("New Home, New Life") an everyday story of country folk incorporating pieces of useful information. Although the useful information was more likely to concern unexploded land mines and opium addiction than the latest farming techniques, the inspiration and model of Naway Kor, Naway Jwand was The Archers, and the initial workshopping with Afghan writers included an Archers scriptwriter. A 1997 study found that listeners to the soap opera were significantly less likely to be injured by a mine than non-listeners.

In Rwanda, the BBC World Service's Rwanda-Rundi service has been broadcasting the Archers-inspired soap opera Urunana ("Hand in Hand") since 1999.

The Archers was the model for the Russian radio soap opera Dom 7, Podyezd 4 ("House 7, Entrance 4"), on which the former Prime Minister, Tony Blair, once made a cameo appearance.

=== Parodies ===
Tony Hancock starred in the Galton and Simpson spoof "The Bowmans" in an episode of BBC Television's Hancock's Half Hour.

Ned Sherrin produced a short 1973 film called The Cobblers of Umbridge. The cast included Joan Sims, Lance Percival, Roy Kinnear, Derek Griffiths and John Fortune.

John Finnemore's Souvenir Programme has parodied The Archers with its recurring "The Archers Accidentally" sketches; the sketches claim to portray The Archers as it sounds to people who only listen to the show inadvertently.

The radio series of Dead Ringers has frequently parodied characters from The Archers, including a special edition.

The subtitle was parodied by Bill Tidy in his long-running cartoon of The Cloggies, "an Everyday Saga in the Life of Clog Dancing Folk", which ran in the satirical magazine Private Eye, and later in The Listener.

In Series 12 episode 4 of the BBC series Father Brown, the plot concerns a radio programme called The Muckles, which is clearly based on The Archers.

== See also ==
- List of longest-serving soap opera actors
- List of radio soap operas
