= Patricia Greene =

English actress (1931–2026)

Patricia Greene MBE
- Greene in 2010
- Born: Patricia Honor Greene; 26 January 1931; Allenton, Derby, England
- Died: 9 July 2026 (aged 95); Buckinghamshire, England
- Education: Royal Central School of Speech and Drama
- Occupation: Actress
- Years active: 1957–2026
- Spouses: George Selway (m. 1959, divorced) Cyril Austen Richardson (m. 1972; died 1986)
- Children: 1

Patricia Honor Greene (26 January 1931 – 9 July 2026) was an English actress best known for voicing matriarch Jill Archer in the radio serial The Archers. She played the role from 1957 until her death in 2026, making her the world's longest serving actor in a soap opera in any medium (radio, television or internet). Greene also briefly acted in television and film.

== Early life ==
Greene was born in Allenton, Derby, England, on 26 January 1931, the second daughter of Edward Greene, a piano salesman, and Agnes Johnson, a housewife. Her grandfather, Edward Fitzgerald Greene, who lived in Derby, was a butler. Greene has recalled experiences of her mother having an extramarital affair, in which her mother would bring the man home and order Greene to not tell her father. She remarked that it was not the best way to bring up a child. Her family moved to Campion Street in the New Zealand part of the city, where she attended Ashgate Infants School on Ashbourne Road. Later she moved to Kirk Street, Chester Green, attending St Paul's Junior School and the Parkfields Cedars Grammar School.

She began working as a ward orderly at the Derbyshire Children's Hospital and in the sheet metal factory of Hawk Industries, but noticed her father crying at a theatre performance. She credited that moment with her wanting to become an actress as she wanted to make people emote. She then went to the Royal Central School of Speech and Drama in London in 1951. During a microphone technique class, a teacher told her that she would never be on television due to sounding like a "fairy in hockey boots".

== Career ==
In 1957, she auditioned for the role of Jill Archer in the BBC Radio 4 soap The Archers. She was preceded by six experienced radio actresses in the audition process and felt that she would not get it. However, she was subsequently cast in the role. Greene said she found the first six weeks of appearing on The Archers tough due to her inexperience; she recalled that on her second day, she took stage directions too far and threw a glass of water over Norman Painting, who portrayed Phil Archer, and nearly electrocuted him. This impressed series creator Godfrey Baseley and he kept her on the series.

Greene would continue to voice Jill for the next 68 years until her own death, with her final episode broadcast in September 2025. She also voiced the character for an episode of One Foot in the Grave in 1990. Greene holds a Guinness World Record for being the longest serving actor in a soap opera in any medium.

Outside of The Archers, her other roles included a small role in the television film A Man For All Seasons in 1957. In 1961, she appeared as Anne in the British film The Kitchen, and in 1964 she played Mary in the TV series It's a Woman's World. Greene also played various characters in the ITV soap opera Crossroads between 1965 and 1969.

In March 2000, she appeared in the first episode of the BBC medical soap opera Doctors as Margaret Richmond. She reprised the role a month later, as well as appearing in an episode of the BBC medical drama Casualty later in 2000.

== Personal life and death ==
Greene married English actor George Selway in 1959. They later divorced, and she married Cyril Austen Richardson in 1972, with whom she had a son, born in 1972. She was widowed in 1986. Greene was tempted to leave The Archers when her son was a toddler, but felt a loyalty to the programme, and stayed.

In August 2023, Greene moved to Cliveden Manor Care Home in Marlow, Buckinghamshire. She continued to record for The Archers until shortly before her death on 9 July 2026, aged 95.

== Honours ==
Greene was awarded the MBE in 1997 and was conferred an honorary Master of Arts degree by the University of Derby in 2017.

== Filmography ==
Year	Title	Role	Notes
1957–2025	The Archers	Jill Archer (voice)	Radio series; regular role
1957	A Man for All Seasons	Woman	Television film
1961	The Kitchen	Anne	Film
1964	It's a Woman's World	Mary	1 episode
1965–1969	Crossroads	Margaret Robson; Mrs. Lynch; Mrs. Grey	Various roles
1990	One Foot in the Grave	Jill Archer (voice)	1 episode
2000	Doctors	Margaret Richmond	2 episodes
2000	Casualty	Ivy Watson	1 episode
