= New Home, New Life =

Afghan adio soap opera

- Genre: Radio drama
- Created by: John Butt
- Recording studio: BBC Peshawar (-2002), BBC Kabul (2002-)
- Original release: 1994

New Home, New Life (Pashto: Naway Kor, Naway Jwand) is an Afghan radio soap opera. It started out in 1994 produced by the BBC World Service at the service station in Peshawar, Pakistan, and inspired by the BBC's The Archers. It was created by John Butt - a Brit who first arrived in Afghanistan as a hippie in 1969 - alongside Liz Rigbey, a former editor of The Archers during the 1980s.

The show combined entertainment with educating the rural population. Set in three Afghan villages, and broadcast in both Pashto and Dari, the show was popular among many Afghans during the first era of the Taliban regime, despite the group's ban on radio. Apparently some Taliban leaders themselves were fans of the show. There was reportedly near-universal listenership by Afghans both within and outside the country. The British government and mission in Afghanistan had also invested much into the show during the 2000s.

The UN's Kofi Annan called the show "a perfect illustration of how the media can use drama and entertainment to advance the cause of peace and development". The BBC moved the show's production from Peshawar to Kabul in 2002. Mehrali Watandost, who played the character Nazir in the drama, died in 2017.

New Home, New Life is now independently produced.
