= Grace Archer =

Character in BBC Radio 4 drama The Archers

- The Archers character
- Portrayed by: Monica Grey; Ysanne Churchman
- Duration: 1951–1955
- First appearance: 1 January 1951
- Last appearance: 22 September 1955
- Created by: Godfrey Baseley
- Introduced by: Tony Shryane
In-universe information
- Occupation: Housewife, writer
- Father: George Fairbrother
- Half-brothers: Robin Fairbrother
- Husband: Phil Archer

Grace Archer (also Fairbrother) is a fictional character from the British radio soap opera The Archers. She was one of the original characters and was played by Monica Grey and then Ysanne Churchman. The episode depicting her death was broadcast by the BBC on 22 September 1955, the same evening as the launch of ITV, so as to distract from it.

== Development ==
Grace is one of the ten original characters conceived by the creator of The Archers, Godfrey Baseley. Actress Monica Grey was cast as Grace. She left a touring production of Reluctant Heroes to take up the role. She had previously appeared in several radio plays. In 1952, Grey left the cast and Ysanne Churchman took over the role. She had experience with The Archers, having played Jennifer Archer in 1951.

The character was billed as "the daughter of a manufacturer who has bought a three-hundred acre farm for her benefit". She was the only daughter of George Fairbrother (Leslie Bowmar) and as a result was "spoilt, wilful and manipulative; but she was also warm, impulsive and very, very beautiful." Discussing her fictional backstory, Joanna Toye and Adrian Flynn of The Archers Encyclopaedia said that Grace was "quickly absorbed" into Ambridge's social scene, following her father's purchase of the farm. She became secretary of the Young Farmers and helped promote the local tennis club. When The Archers began, Grace attends a New Year's Eve gathering at Dan (Harry Oakes) and Doris Archer's (Gwen Berryman) home and makes a slightly tearful toast.

In the opening episodes, Grace is friendly with Phil Archer (Norman Painting), her father's farm manager. William Smethurst wrote that Grace was "a nice young girl and would make him a good wife." The pair are heard sharing a kiss in the car when he drives her home and they soon began a relationship. Toye and Flynn noted that Grace and Phil were too young to settle down and thus writers created a number of "diversions" to keep them apart.

== Storylines ==
Grace is the daughter of a wealthy English family. She falls in love with Phil Archer (Norman Painting), the son of a farmer, and they are married in April 1955. A few months later, a fire breaks out at the stables while the residents of the village are at a dinner in the church hall. Grace runs into the burning stables to try to save her friend's horse and, as she searches, a burning beam falls down onto her, leaving her trapped. Phil and the others at the party learn that Grace is trapped in the shed and they pull her from the wreckage. She is rushed to hospital, but is pronounced dead on arrival.

== Reception ==
An audience of 20 million tuned into The Archers to hear Grace's death in 1955. A writer for the Sunday Mercury called Grace's death "One of the most controversial events in Ambridge history." Nick Collins, writing for The Daily Telegraph, named Grace's death as one of The Archers' most shocking storylines In 2011, listeners voted Grace's death as their fifth most potent Archers memory in a poll conducted on the BBC's Archers website. The storyline received 9.7% of the vote. The scene is mentioned in the British sitcom The Good Life (series 3 episode 1).
