= Peggy Woolley =

Fictional character from the BBC Radio 4 soap opera The Archers

- The Archers character
- June Spencer as Peggy
- Portrayed by: June Spencer (1950–1953, 1962–2022); Thelma Rogers (1953–1962); Emerald O'Hanrahan (spin-off)
- Duration: 1950–2022
- First appearance: 29 May 1950
- Last appearance: 31 July 2022
- Created by: Godfrey Baseley
- Introduced by: Godfrey Baseley (1950)
- Spin-off appearances: Victory At Ambridge (2025)
In-universe information
- Occupation: Publican (retired)
- Mother: Polly Perkins
- Stepfather: Arthur Perkins (1959–1965)
- Husband: Jack Archer (until 1972); Jack Woolley (1991–2014)
- Sons: Tony Archer
- Daughters: Jennifer Aldridge; Lilian Bellamy
- Stepdaughters: Hazel Woolley
- Grandsons: Adam Macy; Tom Archer; James Bellamy
- Granddaughters: Debbie Aldridge; Kate Aldridge; Alice Carter; Helen Archer
- First cousins: Bill Slater
- Other relatives: Johnny Phillips; Phoebe Aldridge; Henry Archer; Mungo Bellamy; Jack Archer; Martha Carter

Margaret "Peggy" Beryl Woolley (also Perkins and Archer) is a fictional character from the BBC Radio 4 soap opera The Archers. Portrayed by June Spencer for over 60 years, Peggy has served as the core family's – and by extension, the village's – matriarch. Until July 2022 Spencer was the only remaining member of the original cast. The character returned in a special prequel in 2025 to celebrate the 80th anniversary of VE Day, in which she was voiced by Emerald O'Hanrahan, who also voices Emma Grundy in The Archers. The prequel takes place five years before The Archers.

The Independent newspaper has called Peggy "a fixture in the kitchens and sitting rooms of middle England since Clement Attlee was prime minister" and has a voice that is the "epitome of reassurance'. BBC Radio 4 calls the character a "traditionalist" who makes her "opinions known to her children if she felt they were contravening her strict moral code". Other commentators have labelled her as a "gangsta granny" and a "wealthy widow who lives in a grand house and controls family members using her money". Spencer also recorded episodes as Peggy at the Chelsea Flower Show.

Spencer originally spent three years in the role, starting in 1950, until quitting the serial in 1953, and being replaced by Thelma Rogers. Spencer twice returned to The Archers in the following years to play another character, Rita Flynn, and was part of the cast when Rogers vacated the role of Peggy in 1962. Spencer swiftly resumed the role of Peggy. The character has been a widow twice, first to Jack Archer, and later Jack Woolley, suffered a stroke, raised children and run a pub. In 2018, Spencer said one of her goals was to celebrate her 100th birthday in June 2019, while still performing in The Archers, a feat which she achieved. In December 2021, Camilla, Duchess of Cornwall marked the 70th anniversary of The Archers, and helped Spencer, then 102 years old, cut the cake.

== Casting and early years ==
Spencer got her first radio role at the age of 18 playing a child in a programme about the railways. Spencer said she did not need to audition for the role, because she was already contracted to the BBC to star in a string of other radio plays. "My work was well-known", she said. When she started on The Archers, she initially played two roles – Peggy Archer and Rita Flynn, a local Irish baker with a thick accent. "When The Archers started, there were only seven of us in that pilot episode," Spencer told the BBC in a 2012 interview. "In the very first few weeks, those of us who could were doubling parts and my other major part was as the Irish Rita Flynn and she had a very different voice". She says Peggy's voice was "very light and high in those days" while Rita's was "much darker and lower". The original cast were put on 13-week contracts. Experienced actors such as Spencer, were paid £12 for five episodes, while other actors were paid between £8 and £10.

Spencer recalled in the same interview "barely having a free weekend" due to the demand of public appearances to promote the serial. "I can remember on one occasion being flown down to Cornwall in a rather ancient plane which had been very loosely adapted for civilian use," she told the BBC. "When we got there, there was a very large gathering of the Women's Institute for women all over Cornwall. Such was the popularity of the programme, I was literally mobbed."

Spencer said in a 2010 interview with The Independent that it was "very little pay" in the early days of the show. "There was plenty of time to do other things. I was doing a lot of radio at the time. There were only about 10 or 12 of us, now there are over 60." Spencer has also criticised The Archers creator Godfrey Baseley as being a "very abrupt man" who "could be very dictatorial" and "thought he was God". She added, "I can't say he was greatly loved". According to Spencer, "He wasn't very popular but he knew what he was doing when he invented The Archers."

=== Longevity and departure ===
In many interviews given around the time of the show's 60th anniversary in 2010, Spencer admitted that she did not see herself playing the part of Peggy Perkins as a long-term acting job.

In an interview with Radio Times journalist David Brown, she says it was a "tuppenny-ha'penny thing" and "very badly paid". "I want to continue for as long as I can turn in a decent performance — I wouldn't want to go downhill", she told Brown. "But I'd like to turn 100 [in June 2019] and still be in The Archers. I'm afraid I can't wait to retire until Peggy's 100 because she's five years younger than me. Spencer drove to the studio in Birmingham to record her lines up "a couple of times a week" until her mid-90s, but is now granted a company vehicle: "I have degeneration of my spine, which makes me very bent, so it's difficult to stand at the microphone, though the studio manager really looks after me and there's always a chair for me while we're waiting. Sometimes, if Peggy has to stand at the end of a scene, I fake the sound of making the effort to get up."

On 8 August 2022, Spencer confirmed that she had retired from The Archers after playing Peggy for more than 70 years. Her final appearance was broadcast on 31 July. Of her decision, Spencer stated: "In 1950, I helped to plant an acorn. It took root and in January 1951 it was planted out and called The Archers. Over the years it has thrived and become a splendid great tree with many branches. But now this old branch, known as Peggy, has become weak and unsafe so I decided it was high time she 'boughed' out, so I have duly lopped her." In the episode broadcast on 8 August, the character's son and daughter-in-law reflect on Peggy's life and agree that she is "an extraordinary woman." During the episode broadcast on 8 May 2025, her daughter Lilian informs her brother Tony that Peggy has died in her chair at her care home.

== Development ==
=== Characterisation ===
In a 2010 interview with Chris Irvine of The Daily Telegraph, Peggy is described as a "matriarchal figure". Spencer gave a much more brutal assessment, saying her character was "a nice old thing" who didn't always "see the funny side of things". "Peggy's quite narrow-minded in some things," Spencer says. "When Ambridge had a female vicar, she disapproved to such an extent she wouldn't go to church. I wouldn't say no to a woman vicar. A good woman vicar is better than a bad male one.

When Spencer was interviewed for the BBC radio show Desert Island Discs in 2010, she said listeners who met her often described how she looked exactly as they had imagined. "However, we don't have all that much in common," she told Kirsty Young. "I love my garden, although I can't do a lot in it these days and Peggy loves her garden and of course both have husbands with dementia. But I don't think Peggy has a sense of humour and I think I have. Sometimes funny things happen to Peggy and she doesn't always see the funny side of things, I'm afraid."

The programme's official website lists Peggy's 'likes' as going to church on Sunday, cats, and her garden; she dislikes mobile phones, loud music and "slack standards". "Peggy is a strong-minded woman, reflecting the character of her late mother, 'Mrs P'"; the website attributes Spencer as saying: "she also has a softer side, loving and loyal. She doesn't have a great sense of humour and has very strong principles." The show's editor Jeremy Howe, described Peggy as "utterly charming, utterly ruthless, sharp as a knife and witty in spades."

=== First years ===
Peggy Perkins is introduced as Jack Archer's "Londoner" wife in the first episodes broadcast in 1951 at a New Year's party held at the Archers' home. That same year, Peggy would give birth to her third child, Tony. The next year, Jack threw in the towel at the small goods shop and went into business in Cornwall with wartime pal, Barney Lee. However, Barney took a shine to Peggy, and they returned to Ambridge. 'The Bull' was firmly in Jack's sights, and he took over the licence. Peggy became the publican in 1953 after authorities caught Jack serving drinks after hours. In 1959, Aunt Laura loaned the couple the money to buy 'The Bull'. Peggy would be worried in 1961 by eldest daughter Jennifer's sudden return from a ski trip with a boyfriend called Max.

Peggy and Jack extended the pub in 1964, once again with a loan from Aunt Laura, and built a new dining room and small flat for Laura. As her father's drinking worsened, Jennifer returned to work at 'The Bull' to support Peggy. Jack would later turn a part of the pub into a "playbar", complete with jukebox and espresso machine. However, soon a riot by the young people who were his target market landed Peggy with a charge of breaching the peace.

Jack's destructive drinking eventually saw him carted off to a rehabilitation clinic in Scotland after collapsing with liver damage. In 1972, Jack died, leaving Peggy behind the taps at 'The Bull'. As stoic as ever, she continued on until her temporary manager, Dick Corbey, stole money from her.

=== Grey Gables ===
Jack Woolley, who had just turned 100 acres near Grey Gables into a country park, offered Peggy the job as his assistant. Burglars attacked Jack a year later, leaving Peggy in-charge of the venue until he was back on his feet. Jack would later suffer a heart attack moments after his wife Valerie asked for a divorce. With the divorce out of the way the next year, he began courting Peggy. But she turned him down because she "wasn't ready to marry again".

=== The female vicar ===
In 1996, three local church parishes were merged in Ambridge. The move bought about the first female vicar in the village, Janet Fisher. Peggy disapproved, and began worshiping in Borchester.

=== Marrying Jack Woolley ===
After turning down Jack Woolley's marriage proposal in the 1970s, the businessman tried again in 1990 when he asked Peggy to the Grey Gables Valentine Ball. In the episode broadcast on 12 October, Jack hesitantly asked Peggy to marry him while she was in the kitchen at Grey Gables. The pair took a stroll through the Country Park, and Peggy accepted. The pair were married in 1991 at St Stephen's church, and honeymooned in St Lucia. The newlyweds moved from Grey Gables into The Lodge later that year. Things got a little steamy in the marriage when Peggy's wartime sweetheart, Conn Kortchmar, turned up in the village in 1992 to try and woo her back, unsuccessfully. Peggy sold The Bull the following year to Sid and his business partner, Guy Pemberton. Peggy then tried to talk her husband – unsuccessfully – out of buying Daphne's Cafe in Borchester in 2003.

=== Jack's Alzheimer's ===
In the early 2000s, producers for the show approached Spencer about shining a light on Alzheimer's disease by having her on-air husband Jack showing the symptoms and eventually being diagnosed. Spencer says – to this date – it is the best storyline she has worked on. "When they were thinking of doing the Alzheimer's story, I was asked how I would feel, because my husband had Alzheimer's", Spencer says. "And I said, 'I'm all in favour of it, let's bring it out into the open, it needs to be done.' It was a rare moment when an actor could influence a storyline. I was called to a script conference, which was unprecedented. The writers and directors sat around the big table and asked me to talk about it – what was it like, when did you first discover it. So I just talked. When I finished, they gave me a round of applause. Prof Simon Lovestone (a specialist in the condition at King's College London) wrote that it was the truest depiction of Alzheimer's he had ever come across." Jack would suffer from the disease for about 11 years, until his off-air death in 2014. Then editor of the show, Vanessa Whitburn, said: "We felt that we could do the story properly because we can do it over such a long period in real time." "And we've been keen to show that he has good days as well as bad." The programme won a Mental Health Media award for its portrayal of the disease.

Jack's first signs were picked up in 2003, when he became confused about receiving a party invitation. A year later, he was found dazed and confused in the newly-renovated Grey Gables corridors, and his memory worsened over the year. Peggy was forced to accept Jack had to see a doctor in 2005. Jack performed poorly in the memory tests at the Felpersham clinic and was given medication, leading to Peggy asking him to reduce his business interests. The family looked after Jack while Peggy was visiting a friend, and realised the extent of Jack's memory problems. They encouraged Peggy to take Enduring Power of Attorney over Jack's affairs. Jack was resistant but accepted the idea after an unhappy visit from his gold-digging daughter Hazel.

In 2006, Jack sold Grey Gables. When Jack's friend Sir Sidney Goodman died he planned to speak at the funeral, but in the end Peggy had to stand in for him. Jack became occasionally aggressive towards Peggy or would wander off. The family offered more practical help and Rev Alan Franks persuaded Peggy to enlist Jack in a day centre. The cricket pavilion was named in Jack's honour. By 2008, he could not recognise Peggy.

=== Peggy's stroke ===
In 2008, Peggy suffers a stroke due to the stress of caring for an ailing Jack. The family attempted to look after Jack while Peggy was in hospital, but after weeks of frustration, her family put Jack into The Willows care home. Furious with her family, Peggy discharged Jack upon her own leaving hospital. At home, she was struggling along with some help from Grey Gables chef Ian Craig, before eventually admitting her husband needed professional care. Despite the live-in carer, Peggy still found Jack incredibly demanding. Peggy came to the reluctant and painful realisation in 2009 that she could no longer care for Jack at home. It was time to let go, and Jack went to live at The Laurels. Jack celebrated his 92nd birthday in 2011, surrounded by friends and family at the home.

=== Becoming a widow again ===
Arnold Peters, who had played Jack Woolley, died in May 2013 aged 88. Peters' last recording was two years earlier for the character's birthday. The actor had also been a victim of the disease. Spencer recalls his last appearance, describing it as a "perfect" performance. "We went to see him in his retirement home. He could still turn in a good performance. He read it perfectly. We worked together just as we'd always done, up to the last." Producers decided Peters' character would die off-screen the following year.

In the episode broadcast on 2 January 2014, Peggy brings Jack home to spend his final days. She puts the record player on, and plays "Love Is The Sweetest Thing", sung by Al Bowlly. The song was significant because it was the same one they danced to at the Tower Ballroom in Blackpool, shortly after they began dating. Jack dies, with Peggy uttering the words: "Goodbye, Jack. Goodbye, my darling".

=== Hilda Ogden ===
A few years later, Peggy comes home from a hairdressing appointment at Fabrice of Felpersham with a new cat, Hilda, to replace Bill. The latter, a greatly overweight cat, died after being run over by her son-in-law, Brian Aldridge (Charles Collingwood). The new cat is named after Hilda Ogden, a character in the television soap opera Coronation Street. Journalist Nancy Banks-Smith wrote in The Guardian that "she has also taken against the entire cast of The Archers, like Kipling's Himalayan she-bear who rends the peasant tooth and nail". "It is remarkable that country folk, who can browbeat a bull, seem completely at a loss with a cat. Possibly Hilda Ogden misses the bright lights of Felpersham. Perhaps she just doesn't like peasants."

Christine is living with Peggy at The Lodge when Hilda gets under her feet and trips her up, leaving her in hospital and on a waiting list for a hip replacement. Terrified of going back home, Christine opts to stay at The Laurels. Peggy insists on paying for her stint in respite, but keeps on at Christine about moving back in. She even considers getting rid of Hilda, much to Christine's dismay.

=== The Canterbury Tales ===
Peggy is revealed as the mystery cast member in Lynda Snell's production of The Canterbury Tales at the end of 2018. Peggy plays a magician.

=== Victory at Ambridge ===
A younger version of the character, portrayed by Emerald O'Hanrahan (who also voices Emma Grundy in The Archers), appears in the special prequel Victory at Ambridge, which was broadcast on 4 May 2025. The two-part drama is based on the novel by Catherine Miller who has written The Ambridge Chronicles trilogy. It marks the 80th anniversary of VE Day and is set towards the end of World War II, which is six years before The Archers began. The storyline sees Jack Archer's family worry about a pregnant Peggy, who is trapped in bomb-stricken London, and invite her to live with them in Ambridge while Jack is at war. Producer Kim Greengrass stated "This special prequel takes listeners on a thrilling wartime adventure, and gives Archers fans a unique glimpse into the hidden history which shaped modern-day Ambridge."

== Reception ==
The Daily Telegraph praised Spencer's portrayal of Peggy during episodes leading up to her on-air husband's death from Alzheimer's disease in 2014. Cole Morton of the Telegraph wrote that Spencer's portrayal "made me cry" as she "moved around the living room, with only the cat for company". "You may not like the show – it is a bit like marmite – but you have to admire the longevity of a 94-year-old who has been working for the BBC since 1943 and is still playing a leading character in a flagship drama," Moreton wrote.
