= William Smethurst =

English novelist, screenwriter and producer (1945–2016)

- Born: 10 March 1945; Bolton, Lancashire, England, U.K.
- Died: 22 July 2016 (aged 71)
- Occupations: Novelist, screenwriter, producer
- Writing career
- Notable works: The Archers, Jupiter Moon

William Smethurst (10 March 1945 – 22 July 2016) was an English novelist, screenwriter and producer for television and radio. He wrote television and radio scripts for series including The Archers and Crossroads.

== Early life ==
Smethurst was born in Bolton, Lancashire, England. His father, William, was an aircraft engineer, first for De Havilland and then Westland, which caused the family to uproot to Dorset. He went to Fosters School Sherborne and then onto Lancaster University (1965–1968). At Lancaster, he founded a university magazine which he named Carolynne, after his then girlfriend and subsequent wife.

== Career ==
After university and studying stage management at the Bristol Old Vic, Smethurst worked as a journalist for several outlets, including ABC TV, The Reading Evening Post and BBC1's Midlands Today.

Following a few radio plays, Smethurst joined the writing staff of long-running radio drama The Archers in 1974, which had experienced a ratings decline. In 1978, he became the series editor, revitalizing the series, bringing in new writers (among them Susan Hill) and creating characters like Susan Carter, Caroline Sterling and the Grundy family. He stayed in this position until 1986. Afterwards, he transitioned into television, joining Central Television to executive produce the soap Crossroads. He then executive produced the crime drama Boon, and created the British Satellite Broadcasting science fiction soap opera Jupiter Moon. 150 episodes were commissioned and made, but only the first 108 were broadcast before the closure of BSB.

He later wrote several non-fiction books, such as seven editions of the screenwriting manual, How to Write for Television, which also includes advice for writing for radio.

== Novels ==
- Night of the Bear (1993) (with Julian Spilsbury)
- Bukhara Express (1994)
- Sinai (1996)
- Pasiphae (1998)

== Death ==
He died from pancreatic cancer on 22 July 2016, survived by his wife Carolynne, daughter Henrietta and two grandchildren.
