= Thelma Rogers =

English actress (1924–2000)

- Born: Thelma Rogers; 24 June 1924; Coventry, England
- Died: 13 January 2000 (aged 75); London, England
- Occupation: Actress
- Years active: 1953–1990
- Known for: The Archers
- Father: Edwin Moody Rogers

Thelma Rogers (24 June 1924 – 13 January 2000) was an English actress. She was best known as the voice of Peggy Archer on the BBC Radio 4 radio soap opera The Archers between 1953 and 1962.

== Early life ==
Thelma Rogers was born and raised in Coventry. Her father, Edwin Moody Rogers, was the Lord Mayor of Coventry from 1966 to 1967.

Rogers studied for two years in Cambridge to become a teacher. She later dropped her teaching studies and joined the Leicester Repertory Company, studying acting, for four years.

== Career ==
Rogers began her career in April 1953, when she joined the cast of the BBC Radio 4 radio soap opera The Archers, taking over the role of Margaret "Peggy" Archer from June Spencer. She was spotted in the early 1950s by Tony Shryane, the first producer. She left the serial in 1962 and Spencer returned to her former position as Peggy. Rogers made her debut as the voice of Elsie Catcher, a schoolteacher.

Rogers worked the stage after her departure from The Archers. She later joined the Perth Repertory Company. She took a prominent role while in Scotland, Lily Taylor in the ITV soap opera Take the High Road. Rogers other television credits include Crossroads and Coronation Street.

== Personal life ==
Rogers hated the name Thelma until someone pointed out that it was an anagram of Hamlet.

=== Death ===
Rogers died in London, England on 13 January 2000. She was 75.

== Filmography ==
=== Radio ===
Year	Title	Role	Notes	Ref.
1953–1962	The Archers	Peggy Archer	Series regular; 438+ episodes	
1954–1962	Guilty Party	Various	19 episodes	
1956–1961	Children's Hour	Various	28 episodes	
1956	Tickets, Please	Rosa	1 episode	
1956	Fresh as Paint	Valerie Gibbs	1 episode	
1956	The Claverdon Road Job	Woman	1 episode	
1958	Tollworth in the Evening	Betty Manton	1 episode	
1958	A Blessing in Disguise	Maisie Edge	1 episode	
1958	Mind Your Own Business	Jill	1 episode	
1958	Appeal: Cleeve Prior Church	Herself	1 episode	
1959	The Voyage of the Wanti Se	Hilda Chapman	1 episode	
1959	A Member of the Family	Kath	1 episode	
1959	The Boys of Summer	Pam Willis	2 episodes	
1960	Prelude to Finale	Caroline Unger	1 episode	
1960	Brief is the Hour	Mrs. Rostrevor	1 episode	
1963	The Mystery of the Man Next Door	Mary Schofield	4 episodes	
1963	The Bed-Makers	Con	1 episode	
1969	The Mayor of Casterbridge		1 episode	
1987	News and Vintage Archers	Peggy Archer	1 episode	
