= Norman Painting =

English actor, broadcaster and writer (1924–2009)

Norman Painting OBE
- Born: Norman George Painting; 23 April 1924; Leamington Spa, Warwickshire, England
- Died: 29 October 2009 (aged 85); Warmington, Warwickshire, England
- Occupations: Actor, broadcaster, writer

Norman George Painting OBE (23 April 1924 – 29 October 2009) was an English actor, broadcaster and writer. He played Phil Archer in the BBC Radio 4 soap opera The Archers from the pilot episodes aired on the BBC Midlands Home Service in summer 1950, after the series went national on the Light Programme on 1 January 1951, until his death in 2009, when he was the longest-serving member of the cast. His last episode, recorded two days before he died, was broadcast on 22 November 2009. The character lived on until Phil was "found dead" in his armchair in February 2010. According to Guinness World Records, Painting held the world record for an actor playing a continuous role, a total of 59 years, which has now been surpassed by co-actor Lesley Saweard and co-star Patricia Greene.

== Early life ==
Painting was born in Leamington Spa, the son of a railway signalman. He was educated at Leamington College and King Edward VI School, Nuneaton, but left school aged 15 to work in a library. He was found to be medically unfit for military service in the Second World War, and studied English at the University of Birmingham instead, graduating with a first-class degree. He did post-graduate research at Christ Church, Oxford, and then became a tutor in Anglo-Saxon at Exeter College, Oxford.

== Radio career ==
He began to appear on BBC radio while at the University of Birmingham, and continued while also performing as an actor with Oxford University Dramatic Society. He left Oxford University in 1949 to work for the BBC in Birmingham.

Painting had worked as a performer, interviewer, writer and producer for the BBC before he first appeared as Philip in The Archers in 1950. He became a script writer for the series in 1966, following in the footsteps of Edward J. Mason, Geoffrey Webb, David Turner and John Keir Cross. He wrote in his memoir of the programme, Forever Ambridge (named after Ambridge, the fictional West Midlands village in which the programme is set), that he believed that Geoffrey Webb, who had died some time before, was guiding his hand as he wrote. He wrote about 1,200 episodes under the pseudonym Bruno Milna. Artistic disagreements with a then editor, plus a general disillusionment with the BBC management, led him to retire from writing scripts in 1982 and to stick to just performing them.

The character of Phil Archer developed from the lusty young romantic lead of the early episodes, working on the neighbouring Fairbrother estate, into a father and grandfather, replacing Dan Archer as the patriarch of Brookfield Farm and a senior figure in the series. Perhaps his most famous moment occurred on 22 September 1955, when his wife, Grace Archer (née Fairbrother), was killed while trying to rescue a horse, Midnight, from a burning barn – the episode being transmitted on first day of ITV broadcasts. The character survived Painting by four months, dying peacefully in February 2010.

== Awards and honours ==
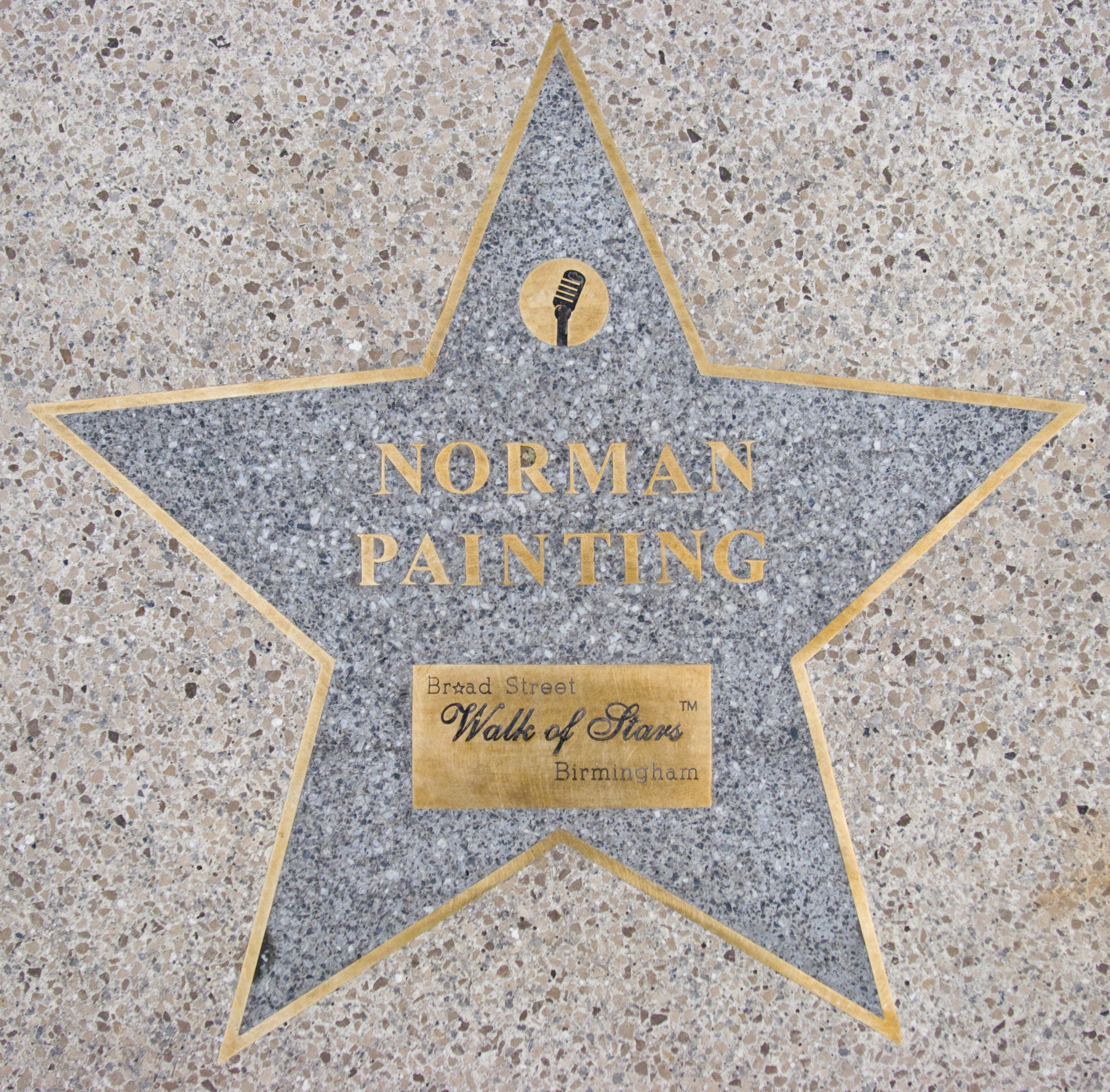
Star on Birmingham Walk of Stars, Broad Street, Birmingham

He was appointed OBE in 1976, for services to broadcasting. He published two books on the Archers entitled Forever Ambridge (1975 and 1980, for the programme's 25th and 30th anniversaries), and a personal memoir, Reluctant Archer (1982). He was the subject of a programme in the TV series This Is Your Life in 1991. On 12 September 2008, along with The Archers, Painting was inducted into the Birmingham Walk of Stars, becoming the sixth person to do so.

== Later life ==
Painting suffered from poor health in later life, with several heart attacks in 1982 and later pancreatitis, a retinal detachment, and prostate surgery. In 2000, he stated he was suffering from bladder cancer.

He remained a bachelor, and lived alone at Warmington in Warwickshire. His body was found in his home in October 2009, shortly after he had died from heart failure. His ashes were scattered at Painting's Plantation in Leamington Spa, with a memorial service at St Martin-in-the-Fields in May 2010.

He left his recordings, scripts, books, papers and letters to the University of Birmingham, and they are currently held at the Cadbury Research Library.
