= Judy Bennett =

British actress (born 1943)

- Born: 22 October 1943 (age 82); Liverpool, Lancashire, England
- Education: Guildhall School of Music and Drama
- Occupation: Actress
- Known for: The Archers
- Spouse: Charles Collingwood
- Relatives: David Troughton (cousin)

Judy Bennett (born 22 October 1943) is a British voice actress whose career in radio began with the long-running soap opera The Archers, in which she played the role of Shula Hebden-Lloyd from 1971. As child characters she played Shula's twin brother, Kenton, and younger sister, Elizabeth, before assuming the role of Shula herself.

She has voiced characters in a number of cartoon series, including The Adventures of Rupert Bear (1970-77), The Perishers (1979) and Dennis the Menace and Gnasher in the late 1990s.

She attended Notre Dame Mount Pleasant High School (a girls' catholic grammar school, now St Julie's Catholic High School) in Liverpool.

Bennett studied at the Guildhall School of Music and Drama. In 1976 she married Canadian-English actor Charles Collingwood, who plays Archers character Brian Aldridge. Actress Jane Collingwood (born 1979) is their daughter.

== See also ==
- List of The Archers characters
- List of voice actors
