= Roydon Hamlet =

Hamlet in Essex, England

Coordinates: 51.750°N 0.040°E

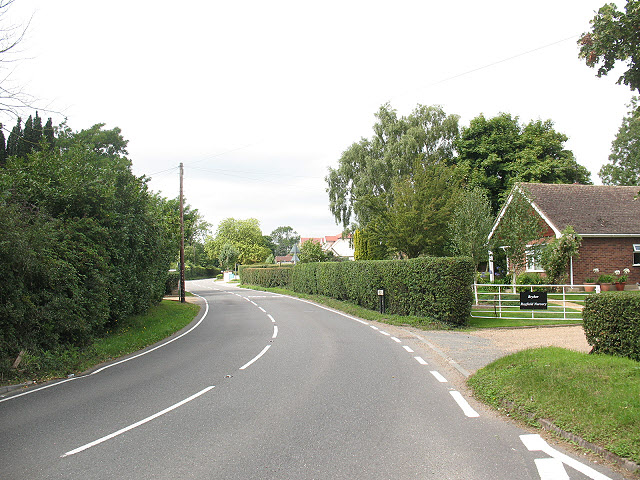

- Location within Essex
- Civil parish: Roydon
- District: Epping Forest
- Shire county: Essex
- Region: East
- Country: England
- Sovereign state: United Kingdom
- Police: Essex
- Fire: Essex
- Ambulance: East of England

Roydon Hamlet is a hamlet in the civil parish of Roydon, in the Epping Forest district in the county of Essex, England. Nearby settlements include the large town of Harlow and the village of Roydon, some three miles away.
