= Jeremy Howe (radio drama editor) =

British radio drama editor

- Born: Jeremy Howe
- Occupation: Editor of The Archers
- Notable work: Commissioning over 300 titles per year on BBC Radio.

Jeremy Howe is a British radio drama editor who has been the editor of long-running radio drama The Archers for the BBC since 2018. From 2008, Howe was previously BBC Radio 4's commissioning editor for drama and fiction.

== Biography ==
He was educated at Dulwich College and then studied at the University of Oxford, worked as a theatre director from 1981 to 1986 at York Theatre Royal, The Mercury Theatre, Colchester, Nottingham Playhouse and the Lyric Theatre, Belfast before joining BBC Northern Ireland as a producer of radio drama in 1986. From 1989 to 1991, he was an assistant commissioning editor at Channel 4, where he was in charge of development of Film4. He returned to radio and was managing editor for the drama on BBC Radio 3 before moving back into television as an executive producer for BBC Two 10x10 new directors strand where he commissioned work by Joe Wright, Sarah Gavron, Andrea Arnold, Debbie Isitt, Ian Iqbal Rashid and others, as well as producing documentaries and single dramas like The Falklands Play and This Little Life.

In 2011 he published a memoir – Mummydaddy – about bringing up his two daughters singlehandedly after the 1992 murder of his first wife, the academic Dr Elizabeth Howe, author of The First English Actresses, whom he had met when they were both studying English at Oxford.

Howe is now married to the writer and movie producer Jennifer Howarth, whose producing credits include Distant Voices, Still Lives, On the Black Hill and Blame It on the Bellboy.

== Response towards Howe’s appointment ==
Gwyneth Williams, controller of BBC Radio 4 and Radio 4 Extra said: "Jeremy has made an outstanding contribution over many years as Radio 4's Drama Commissioning Editor."
