= Phil Archer =

- The Archers character
- Portrayed by: Norman Painting
- Duration: 1950–2009
- First appearance: 29 May 1950
- Last appearance: 22 November 2009 (Note: A recording of Norman Painting playing Phil Archer was played in the episode of 19 February 2015; in the episode his words were being remembered by David Archer.)
- Created by: Godfrey Baseley
In-universe information
- Occupation: Farmer; Retired
- Father: Dan Archer
- Mother: Doris Archer
- Brothers: Jack Archer
- Sisters: Christine Barford
- Wife: Grace Fairbrother (1955); Jill Patterson (1957–2010)
- Sons: Kenton Archer; David Archer
- Daughters: Shula Hebden Lloyd; Elizabeth Pargetter
- Grandsons: Daniel Hebden Lloyd; Ben Archer; Josh Archer; Freddie Pargetter
- Granddaughters: Meriel Archer; Pip Archer; Lily Pargetter
- Grandfathers: John Archer; William Forrest
- Grandmothers: Phoebe Archer; Lisa Forrest
- Uncles: Ben Archer; Frank Archer; Ted Forrest; Tom Forrest

Philip Walter Archer is a fictional character from the British BBC Radio 4 soap opera The Archers, played by Norman Painting. He made his first appearance on 29 May 1950, the show's pilot episode. The character later became the longest serving male character in the series. His longevity gave him something of the status of a 'patriarch' in Ambridge.

== Casting ==
Norman Painting joined the cast as Phil Archer, the "handsome" son of Dan (Harry Oakes) and Doris Archer (Gwen Berryman), for the show's pilot episode broadcast on the BBC Midlands Home Service on 29 May 1950, he stayed on when the show began airing nationally on 1 January 1951. During his time with The Archers, Painting wrote a best-selling book entitled Forever Ambridge and wrote over a thousand scripts for the show between 1966 and 1982. Painting was later inducted into the Guinness World Records for being the longest-serving actor, without a break, in a single soap opera. In later years, Painting's appearances on the show became limited due to his ill health.

On 29 October 2009, two days after he had gone to the recording studio, Painting died. BBC Radio 4 controller, Mark Damazer, said "Norman Painting was for almost 60 years a central figure in one of Radio 4's hallmark programmes. As Phil Archer, he became a wonderful patriarch yet he had started decades earlier as a young romantic hero." Following Painting's death, the producers and scriptwriters met to plan Phil's exit storyline. They decided not to kill him off straight away and let him spend Christmas with his family. Painting's final appearance featuring his voice was broadcast on 22 November 2009. Phil was referred to, but never heard since then. On 12 February 2010, Phil's wife, Jill (Patricia Greene), discovered Phil had died at home.

== Storylines ==
Phil Archer was born on 23 April 1928, the second of three children of Dan and Doris Archer (the oldest being Jack and the youngest being Christine Barford). He attended the Farm Institute to train, but he disappointed Dan by returning to work for local squire George Fairbrother. During this time he met and married the squire's daughter Grace, but she died from injuries sustained in a fire in an episode broadcast on 22 September 1955. Two years later, he met Jill Patterson, to whom he was married for over 50 years. Phil and Jill had four children – the twins, Shula and Kenton, and David and Elizabeth.

After Dan retired, Phil took over Brookfield Farm, where he had a particular fondness for pigs. In 1991, he had a hip replacement operation, and in 2001 he handed the farm over to David and his wife; Phil and Jill moved to Glebe Cottage. Having retired from farming, Phil still helped out at Brookfield. He was also a pianist and enjoyed teaching his granddaughter Pip to play the piano; he also played the organ at St Stephen's Church. In spite of nearly suffering eye damage, after a lead-acid battery had accidentally exploded in his face, he also took up astronomy in his retirement and enjoyed cooking, though this was often to the irritation of Jill.

Phil helps Jill and his grandchildren make Christmas cakes. A few days later, Jill returns home to find Phil has died in his armchair while listening to Elgar's Dream of Gerontius, with a cup of tea at his side.

== Reception ==
In October 2009, Ruth Deller of television website Lowculture placed Phil at number one on her list of best soap opera characters of the month. Of Phil and Painting she said "One of the characters at the very heart of the soap, Phil's death will hopefully be written in a very moving way, and it'll no doubt have a profound effect on the whole Ambridge community. The longest-serving actor in any soap, Painting had also written over a thousand scripts for the show. He and Phil will both be sorely missed."

Gillian Reynolds of The Daily Telegraph said Phil's death was "beautifully done, in seven scenes, three intersecting plot lines and all in 13 minutes. You knew it was coming. That very morning, in a preview, I'd even predicted it. Yet, when it did, I shed a tear. Any Archers fan will."
