= Charles Collingwood (actor) =

Canadian-born British actor

- Born: Charles Henry Collingwood; 30 May 1943 (age 82); Saint John, New Brunswick, Canada
- Occupation: Actor
- Spouse: Judy Bennett (1976–present)

Charles Henry Collingwood (born 30 May 1943) is a Canadian-born British actor.

== Biography ==
Born in Saint John, New Brunswick, Canada, and educated at Sherborne School in Dorset, England, he trained at RADA. He is best known for playing the role of Brian Aldridge in the long-running BBC Radio 4 soap opera The Archers since March 1975. He is married to Judy Bennett who played Shula Hebden Lloyd in the series from 1971 to 2024.

Collingwood credits the television producer and director Dorothea Brooking as giving him his break in the medium. Brooking specialised in children's programmes, mainly for the BBC, and cast Collingwood in The Raven and the Cross (1974) and The Secret Garden (1975). He may be better known to television audiences for his appearances in the mid-1990s as the score-keeper on Noel Edmonds' BBC One quiz show Telly Addicts. He has also had many guest roles in programmes such as Midsomer Murders. He co-hosted the Southern Television quiz show Under Manning with comedian Bernard Manning, which ran for one series in 1981. He has contributed to the schools' television programme Look and Read (as the voice of 'Wordy') and appears occasionally on BBC Radio 4's Just a Minute. He can also be heard on the audio guide for the Edward Elgar birthplace museum.

For four years he was a newsreader on BBC World Service.

He was the subject of This Is Your Life in 2003 when he was surprised by Michael Aspel while recording an episode of The Archers.

He claimed to be related to Admiral Cuthbert Collingwood, second in command to Nelson at Trafalgar (in an appearance on Just a Minute, 24 July 2006).

== Selected filmography ==
- Home Before Midnight (1979)
- The Dark Crystal (1982, voice role)
- Charles and Diana: Unhappily Ever After (1992) as Martin
- Vigo: Passion for Life (1998)
