= June Spencer =

English actress (1919–2024)

June Spencer CBE
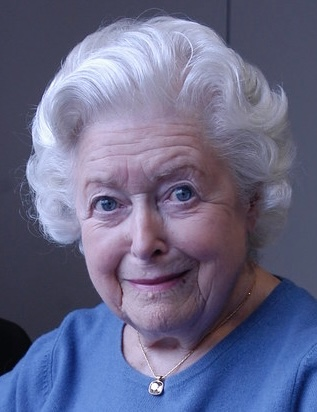
- Spencer in 2009
- Born: June Rosalind Spencer; 14 June 1919; Nottingham, England
- Died: 8 November 2024 (aged 105); Leatherhead, Surrey, England
- Occupation: Actress
- Years active: 1943–2022
- Known for: The Archers (1950–1953 and 1962–2022)
- Spouse: Roger Brocksom (m. 1942; died 2001)
- Children: 2

June Rosalind Spencer CBE (14 June 1919 – 8 November 2024) was an English actress best known for her long-running role as Peggy Woolley in the BBC Radio 4 soap opera The Archers. Spencer played the character from 1950 to 1953, and again from 1962 to 2022.

== Early life and education ==
The only child of William Spencer, a commercial traveller, and Rosalind Thorne, Spencer was born in Sherwood, Nottingham, and had her first acting role at the age of 3. She attended Mountford House preparatory school and Nottingham Girls' High School, which she left at the age of 15 to look after her mother. After joining an amateur dramatic society, she earned a London Guildhall School of Music and Drama certificate. She also studied at Stockwin Music College from the age of 12.

== Career ==
Spencer's initial work as a governess at a private school helped fund drama lessons, which led to appearances at the Theatre Royal, Nottingham. She also wrote monologues for after-dinner entertainment, as well as satirical material for radio programmes. During the Second World War she worked in the Nottingham City treasurer's office before joining a theatre company and, later BBC Radio, appearing on programmes such as Children's Hour and Dick Barton: Special Agent before The Archers began in 1950.

In The Archers she played the role of Peggy Woolley (née Perkins, formerly Archer) for a period spanning over 70 years, beginning with the pilot episode in 1950, and ending on 31 July 2022. In 1953, she left the cast to look after her family, and the role of Peggy was taken over by Thelma Rogers.

Spencer later twice returned to the series to play another character, Rita Flynn, firstly from 1956 to 1958 and again from 1961. In 1962, Rogers left The Archers to return to the stage, and Spencer returned to the role of Peggy. She also appeared on television on Songs of Praise and in the drama Doctors. Her retirement from The Archers, at the age of 103, was announced by the BBC on 8 August 2022. Her former co-star Graham Seed commended her for her "remarkable strength and resilience".

== Personal life ==
In 1942 Spencer married Roger Brocksom, whom she had met on holiday when they were both aged 17. They adopted two children: a son, David, and a daughter, Ros.

Spencer was the guest on Desert Island Discs on 28 February 2010. Her chosen music included the Hallelujah Chorus and Fred Astaire's "Let’s Face the Music and Dance", with her favourite being John Williams playing Rodrigo's Concierto de Aranjuez; her chosen book was Three Men in a Boat, and her luxury a Scrabble board. Spencer spoke of the long-running Archers storyline of Jack Woolley, her character's husband, suffering from Alzheimer's disease, and of her real-life husband of 59 years, who had died from the disease in 2001.

In 2010, she published her autobiography, The Road to Ambridge: My Life, Peggy and the Archers (ISBN 978-1907532252).

Spencer turned 100 on 14 June 2019 and died on 8 November 2024, at the age of 105. Queen Camilla paid tribute to Spencer in a post on social media, calling her "a much-loved part of so many people’s lives, brilliantly combining in Peggy Woolley the roles of reassuring matriarch and 'gangsta granny'."

== Honours ==
On 12 July 2012, Spencer was awarded an honorary degree by the University of Nottingham as a Doctor of Letters for her services to broadcasting. She was given a Lifetime Achievement award at the 2014 BBC Audio Drama Awards. She was appointed Officer of the Order of the British Empire (OBE) in 1991, and Commander of the Order of the British Empire (CBE) in the 2017 Birthday Honours for services to drama and charity.

== Publications ==
- Spencer, June (2010). The Road to Ambridge: My Life, Peggy and The Archers. Aurum Press. ISBN 978-1-78131-430-2.
