= Godfrey Baseley =

English radio executive (1904–1997)

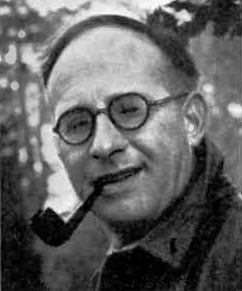
Baseley in 1952

Cyril Godfrey Baseley (2 October 1904 – 2 February 1997), was the creator and editor of the long-running BBC radio programme, The Archers.

== Early life ==
Godfrey Baseley was born at The Square, Alvechurch in Worcestershire, England, son of village butcher Walter Ernest Baseley and Mary Ellen, née Court. He was educated locally and at Sibford School and Bootham School, York.

Godfrey's father, Walter, was the founder and chief of the Rowney Green Shakespearian Society and family members, including Godfrey, played parts in many performances.

Before creating The Archers, Godfrey worked in the Ministry of Information and in the Outside Broadcast Department of the BBC in the Midlands, delivering radio programmes about rural life and farming. With these he was seeking a format that would provide the right balance of education, information and entertainment.

== The Archers ==
Inspiration came from a meeting organised by newly appointed Controller in the Midland Region, John Dunkerly, and held in the City of Birmingham's Council Chamber. A farmer present, Henry Burtt from Lincolnshire, suggested that what was needed was a farming Dick Barton. Everyone laughed at this but Godfrey Baseley followed up on this idea and visited Burtt on his farm in Dowsby, near Bourne in Lincolnshire.

Baseley attempted to produce a programme format and a script but initial efforts ended up in the wastepaper basket. His efforts were, however, rescued by his secretary, Norma, and he sought out professional writers, Edward J. Mason and Geoffrey Webb, co-writers of Dick Barton. After going over his ideas in some detail, Mason and Webb wrote the first Archers script.

A pilot of five episodes was broadcast in the BBC Midlands Region during Whitsun week in 1950, and an extended run of episodes was broadcast nationally across the United Kingdom on the BBC Light Programme from 1 January 1951. The Archers went from success to success, with daily episodes six days a week and an omnibus edition on Sundays. In 1962 the Omnibus edition moved from the Light Programme to the BBC Home Service, with all episodes moving to the Home Service, to be replaced by BBC Radio 4, by 1967.

Godfrey Baseley was editor of The Archers from 1950 to 1967, by which time he was two years past the normal BBC official retirement age of 60. He stayed on as script editor, focusing on script editing and storylines and relinquishing other responsibilities. By 1971 both members of the original script writing team, Mason and Webb, had died. This, along with changes to the BBC hierarchy and new directives, prompted Baseley's departure from The Archers, and he was succeeded by Malcolm Lynch, editor of Granada's Coronation Street.

In the late 1960s Baseley took a part in The Archers playing the part of Brigadier Winstanley, although billed in the Radio Times under a pseudonym.

== Later life ==
Baseley wrote four books. The first, The Archers: A Slice of My Life, was published to coincide with the 21st anniversary of The Archers on 1 January 1971.

A Village Portrait presents a picture of a traditional English village, Alvechurch, through Godfrey Baseley's childhood memories.

Godfrey Baseley died at Bromsgrove on 2 February 1997, aged 92.

== Books by Godfrey Baseley ==
- The Archers: A Slice of My Life - Sidgwick & Jackson - 1971
- A Village Portrait - Sidgwick & Jackson - 1972
- Country Calendar - Sidgwick & Jackson - 1975
- A Country Compendium - Sidgwick & Jackson - 1977
