= ZAZ (TV channel) =

Mexican cable television channel

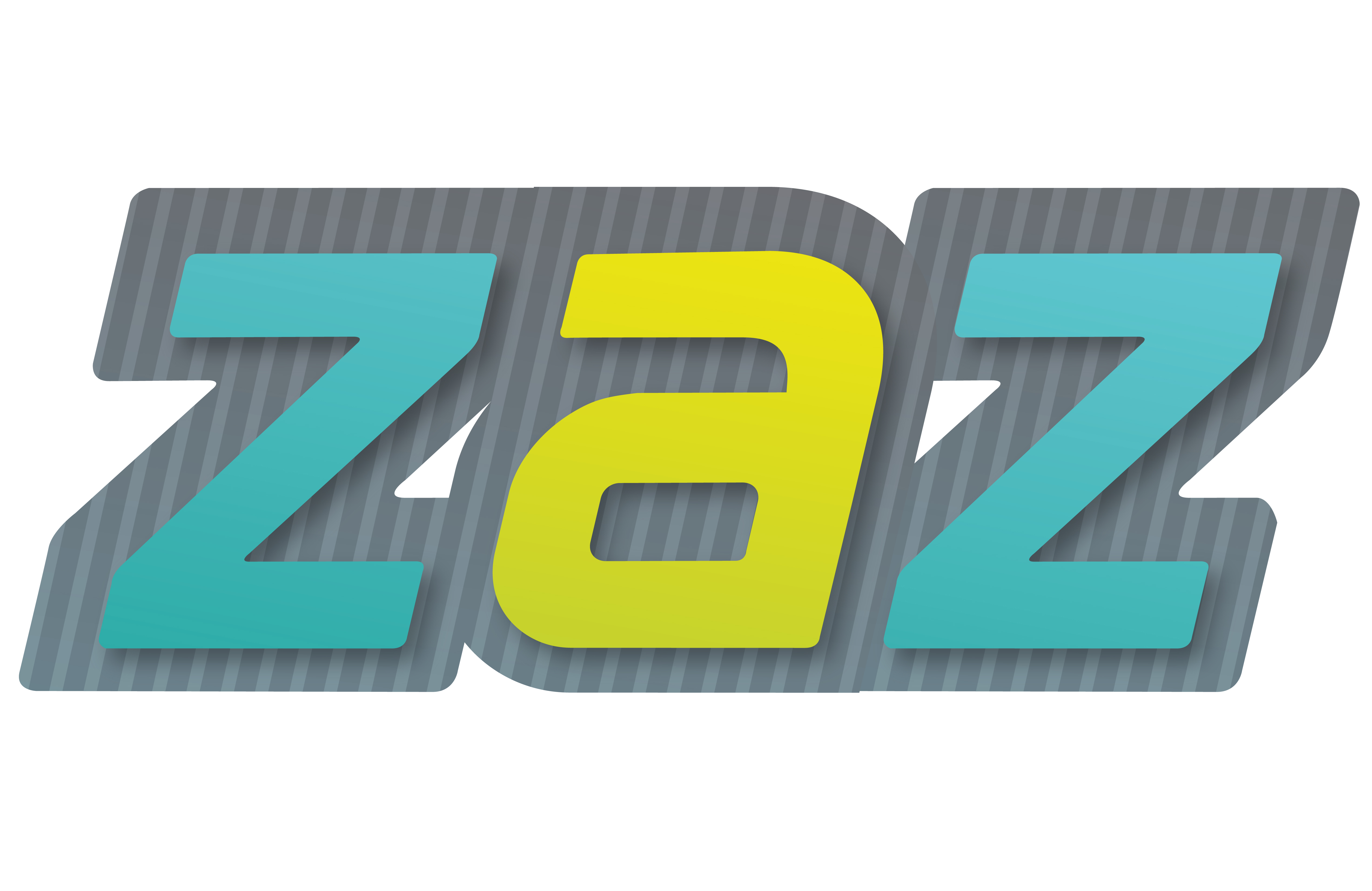
- Country: Mexico
- Broadcast area: Mexico
- Headquarters: Mexico City

Programming
- Language: Spanish
- Picture format: 480i (SDTV)

Ownership
- Owner: MVS Comunicaciones
- Sister channels: 52MX; Cinelatino; Exa TV; Multicinema; Multipremier; Antena 3

History
- Launched: 1 October 1991; 35 years ago (Mexico); 1 November 1996; 30 years ago (Latin America)
- Closed: 31 July 2012; 14 years ago
- Former names: ZAZ Moviepark (2003–2008)

Links
- Website: ZAZ

ZAZ was a Mexican cable television channel owned by MVS Comunicaciones aimed at children and teenagers. The cable network was launched in Mexico in October 1991 and expanded to the rest of Latin America in 1996. In Mexico and Latin America, it was available through various cable television companies. Originally, its programming consisted of "non-violent" animated and live-action series. However, in its final years the channel's concept was changed, airing anime series and family movies.

Due to low ratings and gradual loss of programming, the channel ceased operations on 31 July 2012 with no official replacement. Many cable systems that carried ZAZ replaced it with the MVS-owned music-oriented channel Exa TV.

== History ==
=== 1991–2003: Launch of operations ===
ZAZ launched in 1991 as the third children's cable channel in Latin America after Cablin and The Big Channel in Argentina. It was only seen in Mexico through the MMDS MVS Multivisión platform. At launch, ZAZ broadcast children's programming – primarily cartoons – of American, Canadian, French, and English origin, both classic and contemporary. ZAZ was initially noted for broadcasting series from the Fox Kids Network; a year later it would also air programs from Nickelodeon and CINAR. ZAZ also began airing adult/family-skewing sitcoms, dramas, and movies from 8:00 PM to 6:00 AM, primarily sourced from Warner Bros.; the content of the series promoting family union. In 1993, Fox Kids programming moved to the new Latin American Fox channel, so ZAZ continued to air Nickelodeon programming and obtained programs from Nelvana, Alliance, and DIC Entertainment.

ZAZ lost Nickelodeon programs in 1996 due to the launch of Nickelodeon in Latin America but compensated for the loss with acquired series from various production companies from around the world and Latin America. One of its most successful programs during the second half of the 1990s was the English video game program Cybernet, originally called Gameswatch, which continued to air until March 2011. However, it moved to the MAS channel in some periods, also from MVS Multivision.

In 1996, ZAZ launched on DirecTV, expanding to all of Latin America; ZAZ also began calling itself a non-violent channel.

=== 2003–2010: ZAZ Moviepark and branding reversal ===
In August 2003, the channel changed its name to ZAZ Moviepark and focused more on family movies and less series, which occupied a small space. The magazine Selecciones del Reader's Digest had its own sponsored movie segment, Al Cine Con Selecciones, where films of different types were also broadcast, including some independent productions.

On 7 April 2008, after several years without presenting new programs, the ZAZ Moviepark branding was retired and the channel was rebranded back to its original name of ZAZ with a new lineup geared towards tweens; the rebrand was accompanied by the premiere of Argentina telenovela Rebelde Way. The launch of Dish México from MVS and Telmex later that year caused several pay television services, including Televisa, SKY, Cablevisión and Cablemás, to drop all of MVS's services, including ZAZ, from their lineups.

On 4 January 2009, the target audience change became official with the premiere of the anime series Kiba and Eyeshield 21, joined by Deltora Quest, Yu-Gi-Oh! 5D's, Idaten Jump, Huntik, RollBots, and Ryukendo. On 31 July of that year, ZAZ and Multipremier were removed from DirecTV Latin America due to exclusive contracts with Claro TV.

=== 2010–2012: Final years and closure ===
In February 2010, ZAZ rebranded again, adopting new promotional material and a new slogan: ZAZ, más cool, como tú. That same year, the anime series Inazuma Eleven and Kenichi debuted. In the final days of the 2010 FIFA World Cup, ZAZ premiered the first two episodes of Inazuma Eleven's third season. In August, Ryukendo aired twice daily while Kiba was removed to air two consecutive episodes of Kenichi. On 23 August, ZAZ premiered ZAZ Sensei, a news program that broadcast between commercial breaks where the world of anime, news, conventions, and related things of interest to young audiences are discussed. On 25 September, Rebelde Way was removed from the schedule; its slot would be taken by Lalala!, the channel's first musical program, which premiered two days later.

In 2011, Cybernet was withdrawn because the company that produced Cybernet in the UK canceled the program. Also, in March, Yu-Gi-Oh! 5D's and Huntik were removed. In October, the first 52 episodes of Eyeshield 21 returned in continuous four-episode blocks, replacing the two-episode block of Deltora Quest. ZAZ aired the movie Spider-Man in December.

In January 2012, Eyeshield 21, Ryukendo, Idaten Jump, and Kenichi were removed, and in February 2012, Ryukendo returned while Deltora Quest was removed. In early May 2012, Rollbots was removed from the schedule.

Due to low audience ratings and the gradual loss of programming, as well as being withdrawn from many pay TV systems both in Mexico and in the rest of Latin America, the channel ceased operations at 23:59 CST on 31 July 2012, with "DaiMaOh Revived! Never Ending Battle" episode of Ryukendo was the last broadcast program, followed by the music video for "Tears Dry on Their Own" by Amy Winehouse. At 12:00 AM on August 1, 2012 only the MVS Television logo was shown with looping music, ending more than 20 years of broadcasting in Mexico (16 in Latin America). Many cable systems replaced ZAZ with Exa TV or another channel.
