= MASTV =

Mexican wireless television company

MVS Multivisión, S.A. de C.V.
- Type: Sociedad anonima de capital variable
- Industry: Telecommunication
- Founded: 1989
- Defunct: July 2014
- Headquarters: Mexico
- Products: Wireless cable television
- Parent: MVS Comunicaciones
- Website: MASTV old site

MASTV was a Mexican wireless television company. The company belonged to MVS Comunicaciones. The company offered service to 11 cities in Mexico; Mexico City, Guadalajara, Leon, Mérida, Monterrey, Pachuca, Queretaro, San Luis Potosi, Toluca, Tuxtla Gutierrez, and Villahermosa. The company closed operations in July 2014, and subscribers were migrated to parent operator Dish Mexico.

== History ==
MVS Multivisión's former logo (1989-2002).

The system started operations on September 1, 1989, as MVS Multivisión in Mexico City. The company competed against Televisa's Cablevisión, whose aim was to increase its geographical reach and subscriber base in contrast to its competitor. Both companies had 16 channels that year, but the company's programming total at the time was 120 daily hours worth of content, against Cablevisión's 163. It later expanded to 10 other markets across Mexico.

In 1991, to satisfy viewer demands and requirements, the number of channels provided increased from 8 to 12, and in 1992, from 12 to 16. By 1993 it had 20 channels on offer. By 1995, thanks to digital compression (starting March 1993), as well as the two Solidaridad satellites, Multivisión delivered 18 television channels to cable companies outside of Mexico City, as well as handling coverage of the channels for cable companies in Central and South America. In the period between 1989 and 1995, the number of subscribers in the Valley of Mexico area grew substantially: from 8,900 in December 1989 to 407,000 subscribers in December 1995. Multivisión produced by 1997 Tele Uno (now AXN), Multideporte, Multicinema, Zaz, USA Network, Antena 3 Internacional, MAS (now MVS TV) and a service channel providing schedule information to its subscribers.

In 2002, MVS Multivision changed its name to MASTV. MVS and Echostar Corporation operate the DTH system Dish Mexico.

== Channels ==
Before the gradual shutdown of the company in 2014, the system offered 17 channels, including 5 of MVS own channels (52MX, Exa TV, Multicinema, Multipremier and Cinelatino) which are bolded on the list. All channels were transmitted either subtitled or in Spanish. MASTV distributed all these channels on the same number in all the cities it serves.

CH	Network
51	Cartoon Network
52	**52MX**
53	Universal Channel
54	Fox Sports
55	TNT
56	TLC
57	**Exa TV**
58	The Film Zone
59	**Multicinema**
60	**Multipremier**
61	History
62	Nick Jr.
63	Space
64	**Cine Latino**
65	TV Guide
66	SyFy
67	Utilisima
