= Cybernet =

- Country of origin: United Kingdom
- Original language: English

Production
- Running time: 30 minutes
- Production company: Capricorn Programmes

Original release
- Network: TCC; ITV
- Release: 1995 – 2008

Cybernet (also known as Interactive) was a weekly video gaming magazine programme, originally broadcast overnight on the ITV network in the United Kingdom. The programme was commissioned by Yorkshire Television and produced by Capricorn Programmes (who also produced the similar Movies, Games and Videos) and also aired on GBC TV in Gibraltar and Channel M in Manchester in its early years. It was also broadcast on various television stations all around the world.

The programme featured reviews, previews, tips and reports on video gaming and computer technology. It began airing on the former children's satellite and cable network TCC (who also aired various television series based on video games and television series related to video games such as the Earthworm Jim, Super Mario Bros. and Sonic the Hedgehog cartoons) in 1995, before airing on ITV on terrestrial television.

== Broadcasting ==
Besides ITV and TCC (in the United Kingdom), Cybernet was broadcast all over the world, including:

- MAD TV (Greece)
- Multishow (Brazil)
- OnceTV (Mexico)
- Cablín (Argentina)
- Canal 13 (Chile)
- ZAZ (Latin America)
- TG4 (Ireland)
- SuperMax (The Czech Republic)
- Arutz Shesh (Israel)
- Premiere 12 and Mediacorp Channel 5 (Singapore)
- TV3 (Estonia)
- TV6 (Lithuania)
- NS+ (Yugoslavia)
- 2M TV (Morocco)
- CNBC-e (Turkey)
- Fox Kids (Australia)
- Fun Channel, a defunct children's cable channel (Middle East)
- Channel 33 (United Arab Emirates)
- TV2 and Astro Ria (Malaysia)
- IBC 3 and UBC (Thailand)
- ATV Home and ATV World (Hong Kong)
- ABC-5 (Philippines)
- Bahrain TV Channel 55 (Bahrain)
- Bop TV and SABC2 (South Africa)
- RTB (Brunei)
- SkjárEinn (Iceland)
- MNCTV (Indonesia)
- 4 kanal Ekaterinburg, ТНТ, ATV Stavropol (Russia)
- TVI (Portugal)
- Canal+ (Poland)
- Chinese Television Network (Taiwan)
- KTV2 (Kuwait)
- Regionalnoe Televidenie (Russia, Saint-Petesburg)
- 4 kanal (Russia, Yekaterinburg)
- STV (Russia, Yakutsk)
- NTK Don (Russia, Voronezh)
- NTV+ Detskiy Mir (Russia)
- Enter Music (Ukraine)

== Voice-overs ==
During its thirteen-year run, Cybernet was presented out-of-vision by a number of voiceover artists, with some lines written by Ben Wharton :

- Steve Priestly (1996, 1998)
- Lucy Longhurst (1994–2002)
- Steve Truitt (2002–2004)
- Catherine Fox (2004–2008)
- Randy Fuller (occasional voice over if main voiceover not available.)
