= Gibraltar Broadcasting Corporation =

Gibraltar television station

- Gibraltar
- Branding: GBC Television; Radio Gibraltar

Ownership
- Owner: Government of Gibraltar

History
- Founded: 1958 (as Radio Gibraltar); 1962 (as Gibraltar Television); December 1963 (Amalgation into GBC)
- First air date: 1958 (radio); October 1962 (television)
- Former names: Gibraltar Television (GTV)

Technical information
- Transmitter coordinates: 36.124565°N 5.350358°W

Links
- Website: GBC.gi

The Gibraltar Broadcasting Corporation (GBC) is Gibraltar's public service broadcaster. It has provided the British Overseas Territory with radio and television services since its establishment in December 1963. The majority of its current programmes are in English, along with specific broadcasts in Llanito and Spanish.

== History ==
The broadcasts of Gibraltar Television began on 1 October 1962 and broadcast on VHF channel 6. The station's voting shares were divided between Prescott Ltd., a local company, which held 51% of the shares, Scottish Television with 39% and US network NBC wiith 10%.

Modelled on the BBC, the corporation was established in 1963 with the merger of Gibraltar Television, a private company, and the Government-owned radio service, Radio Gibraltar, which started regular broadcasting in 1958. Unlike the BBC, the majority of GBC's funding comes in the form of a grant from the government. GBC did receive a small amount of income from the levying of a television licence fee. However, it was announced in Gibraltar's budget speech of 23 June 2006 that the TV licence was to be abolished.

== The board ==
The activities of the corporation are controlled and governed by a board consisting of a chairman and not more than seven members appointed by the governor. Subject only to any directions of the governor-in-council, the board is responsible for the corporation's policy. The corporation appoints a general manager and other staff to carry out its policies and the board is empowered to delegate any of their duties to their employees except responsibility for policy. Within GBC the board's powers are absolute.

The chairman and board thus work through their permanent staff, headed by a general manager, who are responsible to the board. Although the chief concern of the board is undoubtedly broad policy, once laid down it is left to the general manager and senior staff, whom they appoint to carry out as trustees of the public interest in broadcasting. In view of their ultimate responsibility for everything that is broadcast, it is the board's duty to take an active interest not only in the programmes, but also in the financial and staff policies of the corporation.

This is done through a number of sub-committees in which board members and senior staff participate in decisions relating to the treatment of political and public affairs, finance and development, and programmes. Only the House of Assembly has the power to change the ordinance and the governor-in-council the directions.

== Radio Gibraltar ==
Radio Gibraltar broadcasts 24 hours a day and its programme format is similar to that of commercial local radio stations in the United Kingdom. The station operates on both FM and AM, broadcasting a mix of local programming in English and Spanish, and retransmissions of the BBC World Service. In December 2005, GBC started internet streaming of its radio service on the internet. On the station's AM frequencies BBC transmission can be heard through the night. On Weekends the station broadcasts live from 8 am to 9 pm with the same format. Radio Gibraltar's station is currently located at 18 South Barrack Road in Gibraltar's south district, after moving there in the 1980s from Wellington Front, its old location since its beginning in 1958.

On Saturday 16 February 2008 Radio Gibraltar celebrated its 50th anniversary. To commemorate the occasion, past presenters were invited to co-host programmes in the slot which they once occupied, amongst them Peter Canessa, David Hoare, Norma Delgado, Gerry Martinez, Christine Dobinson and Richard Cartwright. During the week leading up to the anniversary, Radio Gibraltar broadcast interviews with former presenters who recalled their memories of Radio Gibraltar as well as on-air jingles from the past. One of the high points of Radio Gibraltar's history was that it served as a communications link between Gibraltar and the neighbouring communities in Spain during the closure of the land frontier, which divided families between 1969 and 1982. A special Roadshow live from Main Street was held on the anniversary.

GBC TV showed a special programme to commemorate Radio Gibraltar's 50th anniversary which was celebrated during the week starting 18 February 2008.

=== Radio Gibraltar programming ===
Radio Gibraltar largely devotes its daytime hours to local news and current affairs, delivered through the flagship programme Focus, which has an AM, Lunchtime and PM edition.

Outside the Focus News programmes, Radio Gibraltar's daytime hours are filled with magazine type shows that feature chat, games, competitions and phone-ins, and all is sandwiched in between "Classic Hits, Latest Songs" as per the station's slogan. Programmes include The Morning Show, The Afternoon Show and the long-running Spanish language programme Saludos which has anchored the 2-4 pm slot for over twenty years.

The weekend schedule normally features personality-led shows alongside repeats from Radio Gibraltar's evening schedule, the UK Chart Show and a live transmission of Sunday Mass.

Radio Gibraltar's evening schedule is mostly made up of one locally produced programme airing in the 7-8 pm slot. Programmes include;

- Made in Gibraltar; A weekly series showcasing local musicians
- Jazz Town; Playing the best smooth jazz every week, from everlasting names like Sinatra to the most recent stars such as Madeleine Peyroux
- My Country; Playing the American Country Top 5 songs and featuring a brand new album every week
- Yesterday When I was Young; Radio Gibraltar's golden oldies show playing songs from the 50s, 60s and 70s. This series is Radio Gibraltar's longest running series, having been on air for over 20 years.
- Soundtrack of my life; Insight into local personalities and figures through music
- Centre Stage; Another long-running series that plays a selection of songs from the biggest musicals ever to grace a stage.

Radio Gibraltar also covers Community events such as National Day, sessions of Parliament, General Elections and others. It is also well known for organising Roadshows throughout the entire year, mainly organised around Charity events, Appeals, Awareness Campaigns and similar, culminating in the annual GBC / Radio Gibraltar Open day Charity fundraiser which takes place the week before Christmas. The station also carries a simulcast of the GBC TV programme Gibraltar Government Lottery Draw live every alternate Tuesday. Special programming usually takes over the news slots on Public Holidays, notably the 1 pm hour.

=== Radio Gibraltar App ===
On Monday 10 September 2012, coinciding with Gibraltar's National Day, a Radio Gibraltar App for the iPhone became available giving listeners a new way to listen to Radio Gibraltar on the go.

== GBC Television ==
Prior to the 1990s, GBC TV was the only English-language channel available in Gibraltar. Launched as Gibraltar television in 1962, a privately owned commercial station, the broadcaster became the Gibraltar Broadcasting Corporation a year later in 1963 when it became a public broadcaster funded by government.

GTV, later GBC TV was first housed in Wellington Front, in what was commonly called Wellington Front Studios. Due to its location in Gibraltar, the area around Wellington Front usually floods during the rainy season. GBC often flooded and once this occurred during a live TV broadcast.

In the late 70s GBC TV began experimenting with colour broadcasts. An all colour operation began in 1980 when GBC was relocated to 18 South Barrack Road into a building that is now called Broadcasting House.

For a short period, GBC's signals were seen on a second transmitter on VHF Band III in Fuengirola; this transmitter was shut down per government orders in early 1984.

=== Broadcast hours and schedule ===
In its early days and until the 1990s, GBC TV offered viewers a mix of local production and international series, mainly imported from the BBC, ITV franchises and also from Canada and Australia. Broadcasting hours would be restricted to the evenings, with television normally being on air between 7 pm (later 6:30 pm) until shortly after midnight. GBC TV would also go on air during the daytime (normally for a couple of hours) from 3:30 pm during school holidays at Christmas.

Typically TV broadcasts would begin with a PRD (Programme Run Down) which would air for a few minutes before giving way to a title sequence playing the GBC TV start-up theme and logo.

Traditionally the programme line-up would be composed of children's programming between 6:30 pm and 7:30 pm. In the mid-1980s children's programming would take two slots, 6:30 pm – 7 pm and 7:30 pm – 8 pm with the decision to relay live the BBC Six O'clock News (7 pm in Gibraltar time). BBC News at Six was later dropped in favour of ITN bulletins.

Local programing would usually air in the 8 pm slot and in later evening slots following the news bulletin. Imported series would usually air during Primetime and in the late night 11 pm slot. Feature films would traditionally air on Tuesday nights and Saturday nights under the Tuesday Movie and Saturday Movie banners.

=== Local news ===
Local news has occupied various slots, airing as late as 10:30 pm, and 9 pm before settling in the 8:30 pm slot, where it currently remains. On occasions, during the summer months, and prior to the introduction of the 11:30 pm News replay, news programmes would be scheduled at the later time of 9 pm to accommodate viewers' summer routines.

Local news has been re-branded on air a number of times over the years. During the 1980s, it aired as "Deadline". During the 90s, it was rebranded to "Newswatch" while taking on the name "GBC News" for international broadcasts. In 2023 the "GBC News" brand was taken on for all news bulletins.

GBC News

At present, one news team produces news programming for both GBC TV and Radio Gibraltar. The GBC News programme airs weekdays at 8:30 pm with a replay at the later time of 11 pm. It also streams live on www.gbc.gi and is also available next day after broadcast via the Watch Again player. No local news is produced or airs on TV or Radio at the weekend or on Public Holidays, unless events dictate otherwise.

News headlines air weekdays at 8 pm with an approximate duration of 60 seconds. For a period from 1 October 2012, as part of GBCs autumn schedules, the GBC News headlines moved forward to 7:30 pm, airing immediately after the station went on air, and also incorporated the weather (previously independent at 7:30 pm) and the What's On (diary of events) feature.

GBC News is fronted by several newsreaders who work on rotation.

Due to budget constraints, but taking full advantage of social media sites, local news is also updated via X (formerly Twitter), Facebook, and the www.gbc.gi website. This was notably demonstrated when GBC provided Breaking News Coverage and News Updates of the ongoing British Waters incursions by Spanish Police (2012) and two Bomb Alerts (2012) via Social Media instead of opting for a traditional TV news update style broadcast.

Viewpoint

Viewpoint is the brand name for GBC's ongoing current affairs discussion series. The series has been running for a number of years and occupies the Thursday night slot that has traditionally accommodated most of GBC's past discussion series. The programme's duration and frequency has been significantly reduced over the years; from a 90-minute weekly format to a 60-minute fortnightly one. The programme usually runs new series between late September and early December, and continues after the Christmas break; from late January or February until late June, with a break in the spring coinciding with the Easter break. Viewpoint normally airs live and consists of a panel discussing community / political issues. In recent times, the programme has become more participatory by expanding on the traditional "Viewers Phone-in" and vox-pop to also include e-mails and comments made on social media sites.

Until the cancellation of companion series, "Community Call" which dealt with social issues and topics, Viewpoint dealt exclusively with political issues.

Like GBC News, Viewpoint has several different presenters who work in rotation.

Gibraltar Today

Gibraltar today is GBC's ongoing news discussion program. The program has been running for several years and occupies the weekday lunchtime slot. The program normally picks a few of the day's major news headlines and interviews topical guests.

Other news formats

GBC News also produces Special reports and programming as required or dictated by events. These include interviews and addresses by politicians and community figures, and special reports centring on specific news items.

BBC and ITN News on GBC TV

In the mid-1980s GBC TV decided to introduce international news into its schedules. Coinciding with the launch of the Six O'Clock News a few months earlier, GBC took the option to carry the bulletin. The programme aired live (at 7 pm due to the time difference with the UK) and in a simultaneous broadcast with BBC1. When greeting the audience, the BBC newsreader would acknowledge "viewers in Gibraltar" and also note the time difference.

GBC TV also carried the BBCs flagship news broadcast the Nine O'Clock News. Again this would air live and simultaneously with the BBC broadcast, but at the local time of 10 pm.

Shorter 10-minute bulletins also aired on Saturdays and Bank holidays, although these were sometimes not aired live and were accommodated into the GBC TV schedule.

In the late 1980s, ITN launched World News, a newscast which they produced for the new satellite TV channel Super Channel, which at the time was owned by all but one of the ITV companies. Coinciding with this, GBC TV opted to drop the BBC News bulletins in favour of ITN World News. Like with the BBC broadcasts, ITN provided two broadcasts; the first was a pre-recorded bulletin which aired at 7 pm Gibraltar Time and was a version produced for international syndication. The second aired at 10 pm Gibraltar Time and was the live broadcast produced for Super Channel.

=== The GBC Open Day ===
The GBC Open Day is an annual fund-raiser event that has grown from year to year. Launched in (date), the annual event started out as a fundraiser event to financially support the annual Three King's Cavalcade and also to buy Christmas gifts for the least well off children in the community.

Originally, the event would encompass a number of fundraising initiatives that took place on the day of the Open Day itself, but over the years this has grown, and now a number of fundraisers are held throughout the year with monies being presented at the Open Day on the day of broadcast.

The GBC Open Day normally takes place a week before Christmas Day, always on a Wednesday. The event starts on radio Gibraltar at 9 am, and continues on radio until 7 pm. GBC Television normally takes over, starting their televised version of the event after the news bulletin, from 9 pm till the early hours.

The Radio Gibraltar part of the Open Day is composed of a Roadshow, normally held at John Mackintosh Square, with the public being invited to go down and donate money in exchange for a Christmas greeting and a musical dedication. Over the years, further aspects were introduced into the Radio format such as the annual "Villancicos" contest (Christmas Carol contest) where businesses and workplaces were invited to write and perform their own take on popular songs and carols. The TV version of the Open Day can be described as a traditional Tele-thon, complete with entertainment, live music, comedy, variety, cheque presentations, competitions and an auction. The Television Open Day also includes parodies of local events over the last year, and a "Reward" segment previously titled "Surprise" where individuals within the community are prized for their contribution, strength and sacrifices. Previously the TV version also featured the annual "Treasure Hunt" with live links throughout the broadcast on the progress made by participants. This disappeared over time despite being one of the most popular aspects of the TV Open Day, albeit being revived in the last few years as a pre-recorded segment.

Today, the GBC Open Day is a local charity which raises monies for a variety of local charities. It remains one of the highlights in the Gibraltarian Social Calendar, with most of the community participating and contributing in some way.

=== GBC programmes ===
Imported series previously aired on GBC TV

Children's programming

Live-action

- The Paper Lads
- Jossy's Giants
- Adventures on Kythera
- Skippy the Bush Kangaroo
- Danger Bay
- The Henderson Kids
- Secret Valley
- The Littlest Hobo
- C.A.B.
- Richard the Lionheart
- T-Bag
- Emu's World
- Fraggle Rock
- Worzel Gummidge
- The Kids of Degrassi Street
- The Book Tower
- Super Gran
- My Family and Other Animals
- Home Farm Twins
- Children's Island
- Saved by the Bell
- The Bubblegum Brigade
- Mike and Angelo
- Tales From Fat Tulip's Garden
- Kidsongs
- The Elephant Show
- Terrahawks
- Sesame Street
- Ragtime
- The Worst Witch

Animated

- Simon in the Land of Chalk Drawings
- The New Adventures of the Lone Ranger
- Dogtanian and the Three Muskehounds
- Denver, the Last Dinosaur
- He-Man and the Masters of the Universe
- Fireman Sam
- She-Ra, Princess of Power
- ThunderCats
- Duckula
- Danger Mouse
- Telebugs
- Bertha
- Charlie Chalk
- Superman
- Popeye
- The Banana Splits
- Alias the Jester
- The Pink Panther
- The Flintstones
- The Family Ness
- Jayce and the Wheeled Warriors
- Alphabet Zoo
- Sport Billy
- The Mysterious Cities of Gold
- The Adventures of Teddy Ruxpin
- Fat Albert and the Cosby Kids
- Tom and Jerry
- The Funny Company
- Help!... It's the Hair Bear Bunch!
- The Brady Kids
- Pac-Man
- Tarzan, Lord of the Jungle
- Battle of the Planets
- Scooby, Scrappy and Yabba Doo
- The Road Runner Show

British comedy / sitcoms

- Our Man at St. Mark's
- Benny Hill
- 'Allo 'Allo!
- Birds of a Feather
- Blackadder
- Misleading Cases
- Steptoe and Son
- Open All Hours
- Bottom
- Robin's Nest
- Fresh Fields
- Some Mothers Do 'Ave 'Em
- French Fields
- Me and My Girl
- Man About the House
- Dear John
- Cooper, Just Like That
- Doctor on the Go
- The Fall and Rise of Reginald Perrin
- Yes Minister
- Spitting Image
- Me Mammy
- Three Up, Two Down
- Never the Twain
- Dad's Army

US comedy / sitcoms

- The Simpsons
- The Bill Cosby Show
- My Two Dads
- ALF
- Marblehead Manor
- Webster
- Kate and Allie
- Bewitched
- My Secret Identity
- The Love Boat
- Rhoda
- The Wackiest Ship in the Army
- I Dream of Jeannie
- Family Ties
- Roseanne
- The Partridge Family
- Busting Loose
- Here's Lucy
- Eight Is Enough
- Private Benjamin
- The Brady Bunch
- Car 54, Where Are You?

British drama / soaps

- EastEnders
- New Scotland Yard
- The Gentle Touch
- Coronation Street
- Night and Day
- Sherlock
- Miss Marple
- Upstairs Downstairs
- Capstick's Law
- The Expert
- Jupiter Moon
- Bergerac
- Howards' Way
- Mitch
- Robin of Sherwood
- First Among Equals
- The Storyteller
- Cold Feet
- Fall of Eagles
- The Hitchhiker
- The Ray Bradbury Theatre
- Great Expectations
- Doctor Who
- CI5: The New Professionals
- Dempsey & Makepeace
- Minder
- Bodyguards
- The Saint

US / Canada drama / soaps

- Dallas
- Serpico
- Wonder Woman
- Charlie's Angels
- Laredo
- Bonanza
- Executive Suite
- Twin Peaks
- St. Elsewhere
- 18 Wheels of Justice
- The Time Tunnel
- Hunter
- Star Trek: The Original Series
- Jake and the Fatman
- Cagney & Lacey
- A Rumor of War
- Moonlighting
- Remington Steele
- Neon Rider
- Kojak
- The Wild West Show
- African Skies
- Bracken's World
- L.A. Law
- The Thorn Birds
- Cold Squad
- T. and T.
- MacGyver
- Dr. Kildare
- The Fugitive

Entertainment formats

- Give Us a Clue
- That's Incredible
- Challenge Anneka
- Jokers Wild
- Trans World Sport
- Weekly English FA Highlights programme

Australian drama / soaps

- SeaChange
- All Saints
- Stingers
- The Man from Snowy River
- Serangoon Road

Other

- Cybernet
- Return to Eden
- Shaka Zulu
- Hollywood a Go Go
- The Sullivans – The Australian soap was hugely popular in Gibraltar and is considered one of GBC TVs most successful imports of all time. Screened mostly throughout the 1980s, the soap was a Sunday night staple and usually followed The Sunday Message religious broadcast. Whilst it is standard scheduling practice today, GBC TVs scheduling of The Sullivans during the 1980s was well ahead of its day, with the broadcaster opting to air two episodes back-to-back on Sunday nights, editing out the closing credits of the first episode and the opening sequence for the second to create a seamless hour-long episode instead of two half-hour instalments. Sadly GBC TV never completed the 1,114 episode run of the series, cutting it off shortly after surpassing the 1000 episode mark as a result of its decision to drop all imports from its schedules. Local viewers never saw the conclusion of the series until satellite TV arrived in Gibraltar and golden oldies channel UK Gold screened the entire run.
- Jupiter Moon – With EastEnders having become too expensive for the GBC, the channel opted to replace the series with a new British soap from British Satellite Broadcasting, Jupiter Moon, debuting it before its launch on the BSB's own Galaxy Channel. That series aired on GBC three times a week, normally on Tuesdays, Thursdays and Saturdays.
- Movies, Games and Videos

Local programme titles

- "The Magic garden / Playground"
- "Susan's Corner"
- "3 to 6"
- "Brain Box"
- Top Team
- "City Talk"
- "Snippets"
- "Soundchaser"
- "Storyliners"
- "A Walk through History"
- "Girl Chat"
- "From the Archives"
- "Smarty Pants",
- "Taboo",
- "9 o'clock shop",
- "Community Call"
- "Sunday Message"
- "Live from The Rock"
- "Two's Company"
- "The Mag"
- "Telespree"
- "Sports Report"
- "Telebingo"
- "The Quiz"
- "The Bland Travel Game"
- "The Thursday Debate"
- "Music Street"
- "PLU – People Like Us"
- "Abstractus"
- "Cultural Exchange"
- "The Lamplighters"
- "Sweet Somethings"
- "Summer Rendez-vous"
- "Health Matters"
- "Just Another Day"
- "Vicki's Kitchen"
- "Flavours of the 1001 Nights"
- "News Review"
- "Support"
- "Postcards from the Past"
- "Diversity"
- "Andrea's Kind of folk"

=== Early 1990s – Satellite TV arrives ===
With the arrival of satellite TV to Gibraltar, GBC TV decided to compete with a Microwave Distribution System MMDS which carried the BBC TV Europe service. Due to difficulties in securing the rights to rebroadcast other channels and propagation problems, the service was terminated. GBC started relaying BBC Prime on its VHF and UHF channels with opt-outs. In the early 1990s this comprised the BBC programming throughout the day with GBC TV productions screening in appointed "windows", such as the NewsWatch programme at 8:30 pm. The BBC service was re-encrypted with decoders supplied to licence holders free of charge.

This rebroadcasting ended in 1999 when GBC ceased BBC transmission due to scheduling problems in favour of a relaunch which would see the channel broadcasting its own output between 7:30 pm and 11:30 pm.

=== The 1999 relaunch ===
The BBC 1992 made-for-television movie An Ungentlemanly Act spearheaded the GBC 1999 schedules on Relaunch Night.

As part of the 1999 relaunch, GBC TV acquired the broadcast rights to various international TV series and Made for TV movies. Titles included the British action series Bodyguards, the Australian dramedy SeaChange, the Australian medical drama All Saints, the British romantic dramedy Cold Feet (screened under the Foreign Markets title "Life, Love and Everything Else"), reruns of classic Western drama Bonanza, the Canadian police drama Cold Squad; and factual series, "Hutan: Wildlife of the Malaysian Rainforest", Movies, Games and Videos, Cybernet, Adventure and discovery, Reel Adventures and "Sportsworx". GBC TV also "fills" its schedules with random episodes of music shows "London Live" "Legends of Jazz" and "The album Show". At present most "scripted fare" has disappeared from GBC TV schedules, and in its place the channel screens various lifestyle and travel programmes such as "Inside Luxury Travel" and various Country profile / promotional programmes.

=== GBC experiment: Latin American telenovelas ===
In 1999, GBC TV piloted the screening of a Spanish-language programme in their late night slot (10:30 pm). Flor de Oro, a Colombian telenovela was the first Spanish language serial to air on the channel. It ran for 65 episodes and had a replay the next day at 2 pm. Following the conclusion of the serial, GBC TV launched a second telenovela, 90-60-90 Modelos, this time opting not to include it in its nightly transmissions and only maintaining it in its 2 pm slot. When the serial finished, GBC ended its Spanish-language television programming and restricted Spanish broadcasts to radio (Radio Gibraltar) in its traditional 2 pm – 4 pm slot.

=== Early 2000s ===
Current

The television service also broadcasts 24 hours a day with the programme profile favouring the inclusion of local productions, including news and current affairs programmes. GBC TV programming airs daily between 7:30 pm and 11:30 pm, with the rest of its transmission hours being taken up by an Information Service which provides local information as well as from time to time broadcasting TV programme replays and programming from the channel's archives.

Local television shows airing on GBC TV include:

- Newswatch – the channel's flagship news bulletin which airs every weekday at 8:30 pm and replayed at 11 pm.
- Talk About Town – A discussion series in Llanito (the local vernacular) in which three presenters discuss local affairs, from the need to replace a street sign to important political affairs.
- Viewpoint – The flagship political discussion show.
- Pepe's Pot – Culinary series in Llanito in which presenter Pepe Palmero teaches viewers how to prepare local favourites. The series ended after five seasons in 2006. Revived in 2012.
- Sports Report – Long-running local sports review type show
- Telebingo – Long-running local gameshow hosted by local presenter David Hoare and then Andy Coumbe, based on the traditional bingo game. The gameshow ended on 25 July 2007.
- In Him I Trust – Long-running religious magazine show

GBC TV also screens religious, music, history and children's programmes as well as many specials which cover events held in the local community.

The majority of GBC's output is imported, particularly from the UK, US and Australia. These are unavailable for streaming on GBC's website due to copyright. As has been the trend worldwide, GBC TV has also added a few reality shows to their line-up in recent years. The first reality series to air on the GBC was Let's Dance, a take on the BBCs Strictly Come Dancing contest. In the GBC version, various local personalities competed in a weekly competition that run for four weeks. A second series followed, as did a third in Spring 2009. January 2007 saw the launch of GBC's new reality contest – Weekend Warrior in which two teams of local personalities battled it out against each other in a recruit training type competition.

=== GBC daytime hours ===
Over the years, GBC TV has mostly been on air exclusively during the evenings with a few exceptions – holiday programming for children at Christmas and live broadcasts of community and news events. However, daytime hours were normally handed over to a number of Advertisement formats, most notably the EYE service during the 1980s. The EYE service can be compared to an on-screen revolving Teletext format which consisted of Community Information, Diary of Events, competitions and advertisements. Radio Gibraltar provided the audio for the EYE service. The service ceased when GBC TV opted to relay BBC broadcasts.

After the 1999 relaunch, GBC TV announced it would incorporate Daytime transmissions as a way of extending broadcast hours and subsequently increasing advertising time available to potential advertiseres. Initially, as a pilot-scheme, the service replayed a Spanish language telenovela that aired weeknights at 10:30 pm, but the plan was to extend this to include a news magazine show during the lunch-hour and a Community notice-board type magazine show. There was talk of taking to TV the popular radio news format Focus at Lunchtime. This never materialised.

At present, GBC TV fills daytime hours with a cheaper version of the old EYE format. The new service currently rotates a few ads with Community information, Diary of events, notices and Government Notices. Old photographs of Gibraltar donated by local photographers and collectors also feature, alongside photo portfolios from amateur photographers and Photography competition winners. Portfolios feature for months and are refreshed randomly. Like with the EYE service, Radio Gibraltar provides an audio stream for the service.

=== GBC on-screen branding ===
==== Logo and DOG ====
GBC on-screen branding and corporate identity have changed a number of times throughout its history. The iconic circle set against the backdrop of a computer animation of the Rock of Gibraltar was used throughout the 80s.

During the 90s, coinciding with GBC limiting its service and handing over most of its broadcast hours to retransmissions of the BBC Europe channel, a new logo was introduced. Designed locally, the new logo featured a broken silhouette of the Rock of Gibraltar against a white background and red letters depicting the GBC TV name.

After the 1999 relaunch, GBC again rebranded to an earlier version of the current logo which is depicted by a "silver-coloured wavy impression" of the silhouette of the Rock of Gibraltar. It also features "Gibraltar sunshine" represented by a yellow coloured Sun emerging from behind the Rock, and the Mediterranean Sea depicted by a "blue-coloured wavy" which also serves to underline the GBC red-coloured letters.

Recently GBC has opted for a reworking of the current logo, which uses silver colours against a blue background. The new logo is solely made up of a "silver coloured wavy" depiction of the silhouette of the Rock against a blue background and the GBC lettering now in a silver colour. The reworked version is currently appearing in the Newswatch titles, and corporate idents. The GBC website has not updated or changed the logo to the reworked version. The old logo with red lettering is still being used as the station's DOG.

==== Idents ====
GBC has introduced Gibraltar-themed idents during 2012.

During April 2012, for the first time, across London, in three different places, 55 soldiers of the Royal Gibraltar Regiment were responsible for the security and for providing the Queen's Guard at Buckingham Palace, St James Palace and the Tower of London, and guarding the Crown Jewels. GBC commemorated the historical occasion with a number of idents depicting the Royal Gibraltar Regiment duties in London. These idents also served to launch GBCs new style idents which have continued since.

To date, there are a number of idents. Most depict Gibraltar landscapes, streets, buildings, monuments, institutions and everyday Gibraltar life. These idents are refreshed frequently and are in constant rotation.

There are also "themed" and "commemorative" idents depicting "seasons" and occasions. Summer idents have depicted Gibraltar beaches, the Sea and Gibraltar's summer lifestyle. Commemorative idents have depicted the Golden Jubilee, National Day, and the London 2012 Olypipcs (the first with Gibraltarian participation).

New idents are planned for Autumn 2012 to coincide with GBCs new programme schedule which will see an increase in local programming.

==== GBC branding theme and scores ====
GBCs branding theme has been changed over the years. During the 70s and 80s GBC used a powerful orchestral type theme which was very much in line with TV station branding of the time.

Over the years and in keeping with changing styles, GBC has opted for a number of smoother sounding themes. At present, GBC uses a smooth, inspirational-type track as its brand theme.

GBC themes and programme scores are not exclusively produced for GBC TV as is the case with Radio Gibraltar jingles, and are instead bought from royalty-free music sites. At present the GBC brand theme is also being used as the programme theme for a factual series made by a Spanish TV channel.

== The future of GBC ==
In summer 2007, the Gibraltar Social Democrats (GSD) announced that if they were to be re-elected in that year's elections, they would review broadcasting in Gibraltar and GBC TV and Radio would undergo a major overhaul in 2008. The GSD was then subsequently re-elected in 2007 for a further term. It has been said that the government would consider privatising in full or in part broadcasting in Gibraltar.

During a function held to celebrate Radio Gibraltar's 50th anniversary, Chief Minister Peter Caruana announced that the planned review of GBC and broadcasting in Gibraltar would take place before the end of 2008.

As at June 2009, the government had confirmed that a full review of GBC TV and Radio was completed earlier in the year. During a session in Parliament, when asked by the Opposition, the government announced that they had no "immediate plans" to reveal details of the survey. They further added that the GBC review is "no major priority".

=== 2010: Allan King and "The Way Forward" ===
On 2 February 2010, the Government of Gibraltar published a paper detailing the future of GBC. Entitled The Way Forward, the paper was based on the various recommendations made by media personality and consultant, Allan King (formerly of the UK's Sky TV), in a report commissioned by the government. King's report was dated November 2008 and entitled "Preparing GBC for the next 50 years". Following the release of the paper, the government opened a period of public consultation that ran for six weeks on the future of broadcasting in Gibraltar.

The paper recommended that GBC TV and Radio Gibraltar close up one day at midnight, and re-open the next day at 6 am as a completely "New GBC" with a brand new logo, slogan, feel and programme schedule.

The paper looked at different areas and stresses the importance attached to providing better facilities, technical equipment, staff development and better management in order for broadcasting to move forward and survive. The paper states that there should be more local special interest programming, in-depth documentary series, one-off programmes and local "magazine" programmes separate from news programmes. It states that there is little justification for many of the current "bought-in" programmes as they do not relate to Gibraltar, and are simply a cheap way of filling airtime. GBC's raison d'être is its service to Gibraltar, i.e. its public service broadcasting function. There could be justification for some bought-in programmes where there is genuine local interest (providing they are cost-effective), and for films.

The paper also mentions the need to rebalance frequency use in Gibraltar, as the British Forces Broadcasting Service (BFBS) has a large share for its small audience. A second channel could be used for special events or even be leased out in programming block format such as the breakfast television franchise GMTV which operates via ITV in the UK.

The Way Forward also recommends that GBC take up the role of cable television operator to provide a new revenue stream for the broadcaster.

On radio, King stated that Radio Gibraltar tries to cater for too wide an audience, and recommends launching a second radio station, one for a general audience with news and current affairs at its heart, with the second service targeting a younger audience.

The King report initiated some debate in Gibraltar. Meanwhile, Chief Minister of Gibraltar, Peter Caruana, has proposed to the GBC board that Allan King be appointed the broadcaster's first chief executive officer. In late March 2010, the Board of GBC appointed Allan King as the broadcaster's first CEO for a term of three years. King began his employment with GBC on 7 April 2010.

As of July 2011, no major changes had been seen in GBC's TV broadcasting, albeit a reformatting of its daily news programme, to shorten it substantially, and follow it with a 'magazine' style programme. In early 2012, Radio Gibraltar has replaced its jingle with one that mirrors those in the UK. GBC's current situation is unknown.

=== Broadcasting Act 2012 ===
The Broadcasting Act 2012 will replace the Gibraltar Broadcasting Corporation Act 1963 (GBC Act). It will transpose several EU directives on broadcasting into Gibraltarian law. Under its provisions, GBC will continue to be a public service broadcaster offering free-to-air transmissions to the whole community. Its remit will continue to be to inform, educate and entertain.

A bill for the Broadcasting Act 2012 was published as a supplement to the Gibraltar Gazette in August 2012. The Gibraltar Parliament passed the Broadcasting Act 2012 on Friday 28 September 2012, which replaced the GBC Act. It was passed by Government majority, with the Opposition voting against, as it felt there were a number of technical objections which meant they could not support it.

The chief minister of Gibraltar, Fabian Picardo, said the new Act ends the GBC's monopoly on broadcasting and introduces a regulatory structure for all broadcasting in Gibraltar.

=== GBC becomes a joint-venture and the creation of the GEN (Gibraltar Entertainment Network) ===
Gibraltar Entertainment Network, a company formed in Gibraltar with well-known UK television writer Kim Fuller amongst its directors was part of the arrangement pursued by the Gibraltar Government to try to give the local public service broadcaster GBC a fresh start in 2012.

Best known for his work on Not the Nine O'Clock News, Red Dwarf and Spitting Image, Mr Fuller became one of the directors of the new joint venture company involving GBC in an arms-length deal. Another of the directors was Anna George whose partner was Led Zeppelin's manager, as well as that of Bad Company, Maggie Bell and the Yardbirds.

An agreement was signed late August 2012 with Rightful Media, a company which includes several directors who are also directors in another Gibraltar headquartered company, Personalbest, and include Andrew Smith, Non Executive chairman and with considerable experience in global asset management for leading entities, media sales manager Brendan Golt, Anna George and Trudi Faulkner the operations director.

The new commercial arrangements will see the corporation owning a 50 percent share in the Gibraltar Entertainment Network (GEN), and developing new built-for-purpose studio complexes at Europa Point, possibly by 2015. A music recording studio will also be set up. There may also be cross-over opportunities for GBC staff at the GEN.

GEN, and the new GBC, will not be fully operational for some time yet, as the estimate time of completion for the construction projects has been set at the end of 2015. GBC will, however, be relocating to the Ince's Hall Complex which will undergo extensive works to accommodate the broadcaster.

The chief minister of Gibraltar Fabian Picardo reiterated that the future of GBC must lie away from public funding. The new business model will see GBC teaming up with a UK entertainment company, Rightful Media to co-own the Gibraltar Entertainment Network, and taking advantage of Gibraltar's beneficial tax status to attract major productions to film and record in Gibraltar.

=== Autumn / Winter 2012 schedule: Local programming increased ===
In October 2012, GBC launched a new autumn schedule which saw a substantial increase in local programming. The new schedule included Stuff About Us, a brand new entertainment/variety magazine show that is on Friday nights. A new fortnightly community chat show fronted by female personalities, Women Unleashed alternates with Viewpoint on Thursdays, taking over a niche left vacant by the cancellation of Talk About Town. Other programmes include an adventure-style programme Living on the Edge; The Property programme which looks at Gibraltar's most impressive homes and the local property market; a new gastronomy programme, uCook, and a new religious programme, Questions of Faith, replacing the cancelled long-running series In Him I Trust. As part of the schedule revamp, most GBC programmes play three times over a seven-day period.

Long-running programmes Sports Report, News Review and Viewpoint continue to feature in the new schedule, as does the weeknightly Newswatch and the chat show Diversity. Some new international series will also feature in the new schedule, including Australian police drama Stingers and movie nights.

==== Autumn 2012 programmes ====
===== Local productions =====
(September–December 2012 / Cycle 1)

- Sports Report – Weekly round-up of local sports events (on-going series)
- Diversity – Chat show with local personalities and visitors (programme 13 ended series one; aired 22 October)
- Viewpoint – Fortnightly discussion series focusing on political issues (on-going series).
- News Review – Weekly local news review series (on-going series).
- Gibraltar Government Lottery Draw Live – Fortnightly broadcast of the local lottery (on-going series).
- Stuff About Us – Friday night entertainment magazine show which airs live; includes guests, music, features and competitions.
- Living on the Edge – Adventure-type series in which a local personality/presenter takes on challenges such as bungee jumping and sky-diving. This is GBCs first commission (produced by an independent local production company as opposed to other GBC shows which are produced in-house) (series ended 29 November 2012)
- The Property Market – Weekly half-hour series that talks about the local property market and also features properties for sale and rent (programme 6 ended series one; aired 7 November 2012)
- Questions of Faith – Weekly half-hour discussion series on religious issues.
- uCook – Weekly half-hour gastronomy series (premiered Monday 3 December 2012)
- Women unleashed – Fortnightly chat show where local female personalities give their take on local issues
- Exhibition – Ten Years On – Art series. Ten years ago GBC took a close look at Gibraltar's popular artists and invited them to share their thoughts and inspirations. The new series now revisits them ten years later and looks at how they have evolved as artists.
- Diamond Jubilee Quiz – Children's quiz series (premiered 29 October)
- New Kids on the Block – Biographical series that looks at the six individuals who became MPs for the first time at the last General Election (premiered 14 November 2012)

===== Local one-off specials =====
- Gibraltar National Day (2012) – Live broadcast of Gibraltar's National Day celebrations.
- Clean Up the World (Gibraltar – 2012) – Half hour special chronicling the community's effort to clean up the World
- Gibraltar – A Film by Anna Garcia – Feature-length documentary by independent Gibraltar-born film-maker Anna Garcia. In June 2010, Ana Garcia returned home to Gibraltar to get married. Coming back to the most unusual of British territories, she finds herself compelled to find out more about the history of her family and her birthplace. As she prepares for her wedding, we are taken on a very personal journey that uncovers the inspiring story of how a small community has fought for its home and identity.

===== International series =====
- Stingers – Long-running Australian police drama that ran for eight seasons (192 episodes) between 1998 and 2004. (Nine Network, Australia)
- Forensic School – Factual true crime series
- Legends of Jazz – Thirteen-part series featuring intimate conversations and original performances by some of the world's leading musicians. (US PBS)
- On Patrol – US factual docu-series following police officers on patrol
- Living Coffee – Coffee Culture series
- Making Of... – Film preview show with behind the scenes footage.
- Movies – A selection of older movies, made-for-TV movies, cult classics and straight-to-video/DVD releases.

On Tuesday 13 November 2012, GBC TV rebranded the Tuesday Movie Slot to Movie Time and started a new season of recently acquired movies.

=== Digital switch-over ===
The Gibraltar Regulatory Authority (GRA) signed a contract worth around $1.5 million with Arqiva in the United Kingdom to provide a digital broadcasting network in Gibraltar. The network comprises two digital television multiplexes and two digital radio multiplexes. On each television multiplex Gibraltar is able to transmit up to six distinct programmes. Each digital radio multiplex allows for four distinct programmes.

The transmitters are located at a single site on the Upper Rock, thus minimising the environmental impact of the antenna and support structures, which will replace the two television broadcasting sites of Signal Hill and O'Hara's Battery.

The digital broadcasting network had to be operational by 31 December 2012, allowing Gibraltar to meet its international obligation to cease its analogue television transmissions by that date.

The contractor, Arqiva, provides much of the infrastructure behind television, radio, satellite and wireless communications in the UK.

=== Proposal for relocation to Queen's Cinema and Hotel ===
After the GSLP/Liberal Alliance's victory to a second term in office, Chief Minister Fabian Picardo stated that GBC is to be relocated to the old premises of the Queen's Cinema, which will be redeveloped as Gibraltar's national theatre, and administered by GBC.

== Frequencies and other availability ==
=== Radio Gibraltar ===
- Medium Wave 1458 kHz (206 metres)
- FM 91.3 MHz West side of the Rock and town area.
- FM 92.6 MHz South District, Costa del Sol and Campo de Gibraltar (Spain)
- FM 100.5 MHz South District, Campo de Gibraltar (Spain).

=== GBC Television ===
- VHF Channel 12 West side of Rock including town area.
- VHF Channel 6 Town area, East Side including Catalan Bay and Costa del Sol (Spain)
- UHF Channel 53 South District
- UHF Channel 56 North District
- UHF Channel 32 Gibraltar, Campo de Gibraltar (Spain)

== See also ==
- Communications in Gibraltar
