= RollBots =

Canadian animated television series

- Genre: Animation; Action; Science fiction Comedy
- Created by: Michael Milligan ("MCM")
- Country of origin: Canada
- No. of seasons: 1
- No. of episodes: 26

Production
- Executive producers: Sheldon S. Wiseman; Jonathan Wiseman
- Running time: 22 minutes (approx.)
- Production companies: Amberwood Entertainment; Elliott Animation

Original release
- Network: YTV; Radio-Canada
- Release: February 7 – November 24, 2009

RollBots (French: Les Roltronics) is a Canadian animated television series created by Michael Milligan (screen name "MCM") and produced by Amberwood Entertainment. The TV show premiered in Canada on YTV on February 7, 2009, and later in the United States on The CW4Kids on September 19. The series was cancelled on December 1 of the same year after one season.

== Plot ==
The series is set in Flip City, home of eleven different RollBot tribes. The show follows Spin and the members of the Flip City Police Department (FCPD) as they fight crime.

== Characters ==
=== Good Bots ===
Spin (Sam Vincent) is the main character of the series and the last member of the Zushin tribe. The fastest RollBot in Flip City, Spin's bot mods include Skyv boots, hyper-speed, and boomstick. He joined the Kei'zatsu tribe, but he does not feel a sense of belonging. Described as a daredevil, Spin is known to get away with breaking rules. Spin is fired from his job as an FCPD officer after an incident with Vertex. He is declared a criminal when he attempts to stop a robbery because the FCPD arrived at the wrong moment and believe Spin to be the robber. It is hinted that Spin may be related to Vertex. Spin is the only rollbot who suspects that Vertex is a Spiderbot, and is ridiculed by everyone else because, as far as the rollbots of Spin City are concerned, Spiderbots do not exist. Spin has the ability to absorb radiation and use its power to disperse energy blasts and perform psychokinesis. In "Paradigm Shift Part 2", it is revealed to Spin that he is the last member of the Zushin tribe, the only tribe that can talk to the Hub. He can use this connection to tell the Hub to do things like reset the safety net, or he can get emergency alerts on his comm, seconds before the Zoboshi or Kei'zatsu receive them. Spin is also acquainted with numerous bots around the city, including friends and enemies. He even seems to know the famous botball player, Roboto, on speaking terms.

Captain Pounder (Garry Chalk) is a head of the Kei'zatsu tribe and captain of the FCPD. His equipment includes a shield charger, Torvoldian throwing armour, and thunder punch. As head of the FCPD, Captain Pounder is tough and strong. Despite this, he has a secret soft side. He gives the impression of knowing Vertex intimately, but avoids discussing it. It is hinted that he is after Vertex, although the reason behind this is unknown. He does consider Vertex to be a high priority target, but it is obvious that he does not know that Vertex is (or is now) a Spiderbot, and always dismisses the idea. He is secretly monitoring Spin. He consistently communicates with someone who is involved with Spin in some way, but they only communicate through Pounder's computer. The Mayor forces Captain Pounder to fire Spin after he says that Vertex is a Spiderbot. When Spin is arrested, Captain Pounder declares him to be a dangerous criminal and wants Spin behind bars, but this is only a cover so he can keep a close eye on Spin to protect him from something (presumably Vertex). In "Paradigm Shift Part 2", it is revealed that Pounder did know Vertex, as Vertex greeted him familiarly (such as when he called Pounder 'General'), and that Pounder can speak the Spiderbot language quite fluently. At the end of this episode, Captain Pounder and Vertex fall through a hole in the safety net, but not before Pounder tells Spin that he is a member of the Zushin tribe. It was also revealed in Spin's flashback that Pounder lost his left eye after being attacked by Vertex.

Penny (Cathy Weseluck): Originally from the Kuzuri tribe, Penny is a doctor on loan to the FCPD. She was banished from her tribe after interfering with an important surgical operation on Mayor Aria's assistant. Penny is equipped with a healing glove. She is Spin's best friend and, like him, is known to break rules. She is chosen by Captain Pounder to take command of the FCPD if anything happens to him. When Spin is declared a fugitive and escapes FCPD custody, she does everything she can to help Spin hide from the FCPD. She is seen on the field for the first part of the season, but spends most of her time running the board back at the precinct. She has been an officer for longer than Spin (though no one knows how much longer), and therefore is his superior officer. There have been hints at attraction between Penny and Spin, but there have never been any obvious incidents. She has also been shown to have a slight crush on Roboto, although this is more admiration because he is a famous botball player than actual love.

Lance (Scott McNeil): An office administrator at the FCPD, Lance is from the Kei'zatsu tribe. He is not very strong, cannot roll very fast, and can get scared easily. His only bot-mod is the force bubble, with which he protects himself. He dislikes Spin because Spin does not respect his rules. He makes fun of Spin by always calling him a "rookie", sticks him with boring jobs when he has the chance, and says that Spin will never belong to the Kei'zatsu tribe. When Spin gets fired from his job, Lance arrests him after he tries to stop a robbery in progress, to make it look like Spin was the robber. Lance has a weakness for eating lug nuts (the Rollbot version of donuts), which Spin has used against him as a distraction, and even escaped prison by doing so. He usually eats so many that he becomes exhausted and sick when he is full.

Tinny (Tabitha St. Germain) is a BotTot (young RollBot) from the Kei'zatsu tribe. He is in school, but spends a lot of time with Spin, who lets him try dangerous things. In "Paradigm Shift Part 2", Tinny battles Vett and discovers that he has the power to create force fields and project energy blasts. He has often been shown to be fully capable of becoming an officer, despite being so young. On several occasions he has shown the capability to both run the board at the FCPD independently and to be an officer on the field.

Bunto (Colin Murdock) is a member of the Kei'zatsu tribe and the FCPD. He is a high-ranking officer who is often seen commanding a squad of FCPD bots. What makes him different from the other FCPD members is that his armor has blue-and-red coloured plating in place of the white of most officers. When Spin is declared a fugitive, Bunto repeatedly attempts to capture Spin, though he always fails, due to Spin either speeding away or beating Bunto in some way.

=== Villain Bots ===
Vertex (Colin Murdock) is a notorious villain and Flip City's most wanted individual. He is the main antagonist of the series, and is suspected to be a Spiderbot. He plans to take over Flip City by shutting down the Hub and deactivating the safety net using a device called a "dymex key" that is combined with eleven artifacts hidden all over the city. Shutting down the safety net will allow an invasion of Spiderbots to control Flip City and destroy all RollBots. His tribe is unknown. Vertex has the ability to transform into a RollBot, as a disguise, and to speak in both his native Spiderbot language and the Rollbot language. In "Paradigm Shift Part 2", he is last seen falling through a hole in the safety net with Captain Pounder. Before he falls through the net, he states that despite his absence, the invasion will proceed to attack Flip City.

Manx (Nicole Oliver) is a renegade Kei'zatsu who is now Vertex's head henchbot. She has previously worked at the FCPD, though her reason for defecting and joining Vertex are unknown. Manx is equipped with pulse flares, and is very agile. Unlike other villains, Manx has a conscience. She is aware of Botch's recklessness. In "Paradigm Shift Part 2", Manx leaves Vertex's forces to assist the FCPD after hearing Vertex's true plans for the RollBots. Vertex attempts to have her destroyed for knowing his true plans. She also has a rarely seen Kei'zatsu symbol on each of her legs, though they are faded and scratched out, possibly as a sign of her no longer belonging to the tribe.

Botch (Brian Drummond): A renegade Zurasho, Botch is one of Vertex's henchbots. He is armed with an energy grappler and power shields. He previously worked for the Triads, Flip City's most dangerous gang. He aspires to unseat both Manx and Vertex. Right before joining Vertex, he was arrested by Manx while she was still working for the FCPD. Despite his hatred for her, Manx, he seems to work well with Manx on certain missions, even calling her 'Manxy' on occasion. In one instance, he is even shown to be truly worried for her safety. Botch has a Zurasho symbol on each of the sides of the piece of metal on the top of his head, but they are dented, possibly to signify that, similarly to Manx, he is no longer a part of his tribe.

Macro (Colin Murdock) is a renegade Hai'bu who chose to become a villain and work for Vertex. He is armed with a projectile mace on his left arm, but he sometimes uses other bot-mods in its place. Macro is strong, but very unintelligent and not evil. Macro is the type of model known as a Hai'bu Wrecking Ball. He is the only one of Vertex's henchbots who is completely loyal to Vertex. Like Lance from the FCPD, Macro likes to eat lugnuts whenever he has a chance, but he does not consume as many as Lance does. He is apparently an ex-member of the Hai'bu Hammers botball team.

Phaze (Paul Dobson) is a bot who was in jail before he escaped with the help of Vertex. He is an ex-member of the Zurasho tribe who left to join the Triads, though he did not like them either. He was the member of the Triads who let Botch join before quitting and going on his own. He is soon arrested and placed back in jail, thanks to Spin. He is extremely crazy, loves destruction, and has a passion for magnetic bot mods because of the damage they can do. Phaze is the reason Manx is no longer part of the FCPD, and Manx despises him for it. He appears to have a crush on Manx.

Reboot (Cathy Weseluck) is a renegade Tensai who was thought to have been kidnapped, but actually chose to help Vertex with his plans to shut down the Hub. She learned everything she knows from Zilla and Bug. She is also famous for her 'holographic cake' trick used at Tensai birthday parties. She and Vertex's henchbots stole an experimental bot-mod called a "crontab" to take to the Hub to shut it down. The crontab could turn back time, and no one would remember it had happened, but when they activated the crontab at the Hub, it almost destroyed Flip City. Spin was the only one who noticed the time flux from the crontab's repeated use; he was finally able to stop Reboot and Vertex's henchbots before they could use the crontab to turn back time again. The henchbots escaped and left Reboot to be apprehended by the FCPD. It has been rumored that Reboot has discovered a way to defeat Vertex, but she has not revealed it to anybody.

Tamaki (Shirley Millner) is the leader of a renegade group of pirate bots. She used to reside in Anakata Tower in Flip City, and she was once partners with Anakata, a member of the Fuzata tribe. They worked on a bot-mod that turns anything (even RollBots) into gold, but Anakata tricked her at the last minute and got all the credit for the bot-mod. Tamaki wants revenge on her former partner and her share of the profits from the bot-mod. It was soon destroyed after she reclaimed it. Her ship is called the "Black Dot".

Kibi (Richard Newman) is a renegade Tensai who is now a pirate. He is also Captain Tamaki's right-hand bot.

Vett (Scott McNeil) is an old ally of Vertex who, like Vertex, is a Spiderbot. Vett spontaneously shows up in Flip City in his ship to help Vertex complete the final stages of his master plan. Unlike Vertex, Vett does not take a stealth approach to missions, but rather attacks everyone in his way. Before Vett arrived at Flip City, he and Vertex secretly communicated with each other when Vertex was alone, similar to how Pounder secretly conversed to someone over his computer. Vett has a mask that covers his head. When he speaks, he only screeches a strange language (possibly his native tongue, since Vertex understands him), but he is able to speak regularly on several occasions. This may be because he does not speak English very well and only uses phrases and words that he already knows how to say. Vertex is his superior officer, but Vett does not think that he is capable of completing the master plan and makes it clear to Vertex that he does not particularly like him.

=== Other Bots ===
Mayor Aria (Cathy Weseluck) is the leader of the Nisen tribe and the mayor of Flip City. She tries to improve Flip City as much as she can, but she is really concerned about making herself look good in the eyes of Flip City. Vertex tricks her into making him seem like a good citizen by staging an incident that lets him seem like her ally. She is not amused by Spin because his antics more often than not conflict with her ideas. She eventually orders Captain Pounder to fire Spin. She is frequently seen working with the Tensai tribe to come up with new ways to improve Flip City. She is not popular with some of the bots. She has an infamous "12 in 12" plan to build 12 new major suburbs in her 12 term-cycle as mayor. Aria is also a longtime ally of Pounder's; she is responsible for getting him named as head of the FCPD. She is also famous for having more statues built of herself than any other mayor in the history of Flip City. She can never remember the names of anyone she meets without her assistant reminding her and cannot even remember her assistant's own name.

Chief Surgeon Koto (Brian Drummond) is the leader and head doctor of the Kuzuri tribe. He is very serious with his job, but he occasionally makes sarcastic comments. He banned Penny from the tribe because she interfered during an operation on Mayor Aria'a assistant, but when he sees Penny in action when she is with the FCPD, he tells that she is welcomed back if she decides to quit the FCPD. He continues to repair Spin on almost a daily basis whenever he is damaged from a fight, and he is not too happy about it. He suspects that someone purposefully damaged Spin's internal circuits. Koto appears to be a bit protective of Penny, perhaps because she used to be a member of his tribe. This was exhibited once when he took a hit from Vett that was supposed to be aimed at Penny. He fell off the trax and climbed back up a few minutes later, so it appears that he was not thrown that far off.

Gates (Brian Drummond) is the leader of the Tensai tribe. He is the bot that designed the city's anti-grav jets. He once built a device that allows bots to travel to parallel dimensions, but he spilled a cup of oil on said device and has not been able to get it working since. He is easily frightened by loud noises and bots that are bigger than he is (which is everyone), and he is possibly rigging the Tensai leader elections every year so he will not lose his job. He first appeared when he asked Captain Pounder to find Reboot, a renegade Tensai with an experimental bot-mod called the crontab. He later appeared when he was testing his new maintenance robot named the Repair Online Sytheotic Entity, or R.O.S.E. After Spin destroyed R.O.S.E he demanded that Mayor Aria have him and Captain Pounder held accountable and fired from the FCPD.

Commander Octo (Paul Dobson) is the leader of the Zurasho tribe. He first meets Spin when he constructs a new housing complex by Mayor Aria's design. When the houses were booby-trapped by Vertex, he and Spin enter the complex to shut down the traps. He gives Spin his boomstick bot mod since he was not able to use it right. He does not like Mayor Aria at all because he thinks her ideas to help Flip City are crazy. Octo is seen on a recurring basis after that. His second appearance was when he was revealing the new and improved Nobrek Acres. He also appears when Captain Tamaki appears and tries to help Pounder take her down. His last appearance so far was in episode 26 when he complained about having to weld new plaques onto the FCPD, and he helped to try to fight off Vett. It is revealed in this episode that he fights with a big metal hammer.

Fire Chief Cables (Ellen Kennedy) is the leader of the Zobo'shi tribe. She and Captain Pounder have a rivalry going on and continuously argue in terms of the respective tribe's job duties. She repeatedly attempts to have the FCPD work with the Zobo'shi tribe (or rather for them), and offers to move them into the ground level of Zobo'Shi headquarters (which angers Pounder). When she first meets Spin, she is not impressed with him and mocks Pounder for hiring someone who is not a Kei'zatsu. She is also mad at Spin for getting in her way during a mission. After Spin saves Flip City from being destroyed, she realizes that she was wrong about Spin and tells Pounder that Spin is welcome to work for the Zobo'shi if he wants to be with a "real tribe".

The En (Teryl Rothery) is the leader of the Zogen'sha tribe and holder of the optic. The En captured Spin and Botch when Botch broke into the cathedral to steal the optic. She shackled them both to the wall and used the optic to find out who they were. She took Spin into another room and told him that he was the bot who will stand alone, and save the city. She later stated that he did not look, smell, or (oddly enough) taste like Kei'zatsu after Spin said he was Kei'zatsu. She thanked Spin for saving the cathedral by draining the energy overload. She seems to know all about what Spin is supposed to be doing and who his tribe is.

Daso (Scott McNeil) is a member of the Zogen'sha tribe who becomes aware of Spin's true identity. He holds a mystical amulet which allows him to connect with the cathedral.

Oddball (Garry Chalk) is a member of the Hai'bu tribe who has that name because he is different from the other Hai'bu members. He is quite intelligent, but sometimes forgetful, and that gets in the way of being able to properly socialize with his fellow Hai'bu tribe brothers. When he first meets Spin, his right leg was stolen by Vertex's henchbots, and was replaced by another left leg. Spin soon finds his leg and returns it to him. Oddball is an older model of the Hai'bu tribe and his type of parts are not being made anymore.

Ringo (Scott McNeil) is a member of the Hai'bu tribe who, like his fellow Hai'bu tribe member Oddball, had one of his limbs stolen (his right arm). He thinks that Oddball is weird and says that he has no wits. Ringo cleans up the FCPD building and is good friends with the Kei'zatsu working there.

Roboto (Trevor Devall) is a member of the Zurasho tribe and the team leader of the Zurasho botball team called the Zurasho Slashers. He is considered to be the best botball player ever and is very popular. He is good friends with Spin, Penny and Tinny (who is a huge fan of Roboto). In the middle of a game with the Fuzata botball team, he was kidnapped, resulting in a city-wide riot. It turned out that his kidnappers were the botballs who were originally part of the Hai'bu tribe called the Kenchi-ku. They kidnapped him because they hated being used as botballs and wanted revenge, but they soon let him go and accepted their new job as botballs. When Vett attacked the Flip City stadium to steal the botball cup during the botball championship match, Roboto helps the FCPD to keep the cup away from Vett. Roboto is a very fast and skilled bot.

Bug & Zilla (Richard Ian Cox) & (Colin Murdock) are two members of the Tensai tribe who are always seen working together. They are always working on new and improved bot mods, about which they are very excited, but their excitement gets in the way of their better judgement about how their bot mods could hurt Flip City instead of help it and their antics have caused trouble for the FCPD on a few occasions. Bug dreams of someday becoming Tensai chief, and is secretly building an anti-matter force field trax system in his spare time. Zilla, on the other hand, is secretly reading up on how to be a Zobo'shi and likes to try to figure out what Bug does in his free time.

Rigaroo (Scott McNeil) is a bot who is a participant in the Flip City Grand Prix. He considers himself to be the fastest bot in Flip City. He is extremely arrogant and always refers to himself in the third person. He and Spin have a rivalry and since Spin was not allowed to be a part of the FCGP, Rigaroo makes fun of him and calls Spin a coward. After Spin saves the Grand Prix from disaster because of one of Vertex's setups, Rigaroo realizes that he was wrong about Spin, and offers him his respect. Although Rigaroo's tribe is unknown, aside from his color, he looks just like a member of the Kei'zatsu tribe. This is odd because members of the Kei'zatsu tribe are prohibited from participating in the FCGP.

Anakata (Paul Dobson) is a member of the Fuzata tribe who has a tower named after him. He used to be partners with Captain Tamaki. They created a bot-mod that turned anything into gold, but Anakata wanted to have it all for himself, so he had Tamaki exiled from Flip City and kept the bot-mod for himself. Tamaki returned to take revenge on him and to reclaim the bot-mod. Thanks to Spin, Anakata was rescued, but his bot-mod was destroyed, and he was not too happy.

Ms. Appy (Nicole Oliver) is a member of the Kazoku tribe and was she who recommended that Spin join the FCPD. She was originally Spin's teacher and is currently Tinny's teacher. She has been a teacher at Wozville Elementary School for ten cycles, and is hardly ever leaves the school grounds. She takes her students on a field trip to each tribe's headquarters once a cycle. When Spin wants to find out the truth about his origins, he asks her. While talking to Tinny, Ms. Appy accidentally tells him that Pikea is the last Fangbot of his kind. After Spin saves Pikea and gives him back to Ms. Appy, it appears that she knows more about Spin than she is letting on, and it also seems that she trained Pikea to protect Spin. It is revealed in "Paradigm Shift Part 2" that Captain Pounder brought Spin to her class as a BotTot after saving him from being destroyed by Vertex like the other members of the Zushin tribe.

== Tribes ==
Fuzata is the tribe that handles finances and the economy and they are responsible for the wealth and prosperity of Flip City. They are best known for their business sense.

Hai'bu: Sanitation and waste management are the responsibilities of this tribe. The Hai'bu tribe keeps Flip City clean. This tribe is made up of some of the biggest and strongest bots who specialize in the transport and disposal of the city's trash. The Kenchi-ku are a sub-tribe that originated from this tribe.

Kazoku: The members of this tribe educate BotTots. The Kazoku tribe grooms all new BotTots and prepares them for their eventual role within their individual tribes. The educators of the Kazoku tribe make sure every bot is ready.

Kenchi-ku is a sub-tribe to the Hai'bu, who previously used them to help them clean in the small spaces by kicking them because of their small size. After a while, however, they were being kicked for amusement and sporting purposes, which lead to the invention of Bot-Ball, which is a RollBot version of soccer.

Kei'zatsu is the tribe whose mission is "to protect and serve". The FCPD is made up of members from this tribe, although not all FCPD members are Kei'zatsus. They are involved with law enforcement. Captain Pounder is the head of this tribe. They are the police officers of Flip City, and they ensure that all bots from all tribes obey the law.

Kuzuri tribe is responsible for health care. Chief surgeon Koto is the head of the tribe. The Kuzuri tribe supplies medical support to any bot in need.

Nisen: Members of the Nisen tribe form the government of Flip City. They live in the upper regions of Flip City. Mayor Aria is the head of this tribe and Mayor of Flip City. They are the politicians of the RollBot world and ensure that all services are running smoothly.

Tensai: The scientific tribe are the most intelligent RollBots in Flip City. The members of this tribe are responsible for the maintenance and construction of technological material. Gates is the head of this tribe.

Zeishi is a quiet and mysterious tribe. They live in remote boot sector homes and do not interact much with other tribes. The Zeishi tribe is the most obscure of the group, bots from this tribe tend to keep to themselves and their homes.

Zobo'shi: The members of this tribe are involved in emergency services. They are firefighters, but assist in any disaster. They have a strong rivalry with the FCPD. Fire Chief Cables is the head of this tribe.

Zogen'sha is the tribe that lives in the Cathedral. The members provide spiritual guidance and also act somewhat like an oracle. Their rules forbid the Kei'zatsu from entering their cathedral. They appear to be aware of what Spin really is and his destiny as well. The En is the leader of this tribe. They provide insight into the past, present, and future of rollbot life and always seem to be stressed-out.

Zurasho is the tribe that consists of construction workers of Flip City. Commander Octo is the head of this Tribe. The Zurasho tribe is responsible for the construction and maintenance of Flip City.

Zushin is the lost tribe, and the only tribe that can communicate with the Hub and override the system. The Hub will warn the Zushin directly if there is a problem anywhere in Flip City, but can limit warnings to only true emergencies on Zushin request. They also protect the other tribes, including Kei'zatsu. Spin is the only surviving member. When Spin was a BotTot, the tribe as a whole was exterminated by the Spiderbots, led by Vertex, as part of their plans to destroy all Rollbots.

There are actually twelve tribes, but most Rollbots believe that there are only eleven. The Kenchi-ku is a sub-tribe of the Hai'bu.

== Episodes ==
No.	Title	Written by	Original release date	Prod. code
1	"Training Day"	MCM	February 7, 2009	101
Spin's first day at the FCPD goes from bad to worse when a bank heist spirals out of control, putting everyone in danger.
2	"Breakpoint"	MCM and Craig Young	February 14, 2009	102
When Captain Pounder and the Kei'zatsu fall prey to a trap set by Manx and the henchbots, it is up to Spin to save the day. Absent: Penny, Lance, Tinny
3	"Wipeout"	Vito Viscomi	February 21, 2009	103
Spin and Tinny end up trapped on the Safety Net with Manx while trying to deliver a mysterious package to the mayor and their only way out is to work together.
4	"Scorched"	Steven Sullivan	February 28, 2009	104
Things around Flip City get crazy when Vertex's goons use a special bot mod to freeze the Kei'zatsu in mid-transformation, letting criminals overrun the city.
5	"The Koto Protocol"	MCM	March 14, 2009	105
When Lance gets smashed into Safe Mode by the henchbots, his only hope is a full repair at the Hub, but as Spin realizes, something in Penny's past may stand in the way of saving Lance's circuits.
6	"Inside Outside Upside Down"	Mark Leiran-Young	March 21, 2009	106
Vertex frees Manx's old nemesis Phaze from prison and forces them to work together to take over Pengi Park and only Spin and Tinny are able to stop them.
7	"House Call"	Steven Sullivan	March 28, 2009	107
When Spin suffers a sudden burst of uncontrollable speed, he is rushed to the Hub to be checked out by Koto. Meanwhile, Vertex plans to harness Spin's new powers for his own purposes.
8	"Crontab Trouble"	Mark Leiran-Young	April 4, 2009	108
Spin is stuck reliving a pocket of history when an experimental bot mod called the Crontab is unleashed by Vertex.
9	"Two Left Feet"	Vito Viscomi	April 18, 2009	109
Spin discovers a Hai'bu named Oddball walking in circles, and quickly becomes involved in a bizarre plot to steal the limbs from random bots around the city.
10	"Do The Right Module"	MCM	May 2, 2009	110
Mayor Aria's new modchip causes problems for the FCPD when Spin and Penny discover they prevent them from doing their jobs.
11	"#044"	MCM	May 9, 2009	111
Spin and Lance's boring guard duty of a construction site turns interesting when the Zurasho workers go crazy and lure them into a booby-trapped house.
12	"Goooooal!"	Vito Viscomi	May 16, 2009	112
Botball's biggest star, Roboto, is abducted in the middle of the championship match.
13	"Nonlinear"	Terry Saltsman	September 15, 2009	113
The grand opening of Octo's newest masterpiece is interrupted when Vertex sends his henchbots to steal a medallion from the top of City Hall.
14	"Teacher's Pet"	Steven Sullivan	September 22, 2009	114
When Tinny accidentally lets his teacher's robo-dog eat a special invisibility botmod, it draws the attention of Vertex, who plans to steal the device to make himself all-powerful.
15	"09:F9:11"	Mark Leiran-Young	September 22, 2009	115
Spin's mysterious comm messages become a matter of public safety when it appears he may be causing Flip City to tear itself apart in a series of time-bomb disasters. Penny must help him to figure out the cause of the malfunction before it is too late.
16	"The Whole Truth"	Edward Kay	September 29, 2009	116
It is race time as the city prepares for the Flip City Grand Prix, but Spin, as the member of Kei'zatsu tribe, cannot participate and is stuck on guard duty. When the racetrack is threatened, he and Pounder try to find out how to save the day before the racers cross the finish line.
17	"Inferno"	Mark Leiran-Young	October 6, 2009	117
Tensions between the Kei'zatsu and Zoboshi tribes are complicated when Spin gets in the way of Chief Cable's bots. Things really heat up when Vertex sends his henchbots out to blast Flip City with fire.
18	"The Pirate Bay"	Terry Saltsman	March 11, 2009	118
The infamous pirate Tamaki bursts back onto the scene, and it is clear that she wants to do more than just throw the city into chaos. When Tinny is kidnapped, Spin has to work twice as hard to save his friend and keep the pirates from laying waste to Anakata Tower.
19	"The Bazaar"	Vito Viscomi	October 13, 2009	119
All of Flip City is at the Koppa Festival, including Penny and Lance, which means Spin and Tinny are forced to stay behind and run the board at the FCPD. When Vertex attacks the festival with a weapon that shifts bots into another dimension, it is up to Spin to save the day before Manx can steal another artifact.
20	"The Cathedral"	Mark Leiran-Young	October 20, 2009	120
Botch launches his own attack on the Zogensha, trying to steal another artifact before Vertex can claim it. When Spin follows him in, he discovers the ancient rule forbidding Kei'zatsu tribe inside the Cathedral, and is still much in force.
21	"The Broken"	Terry Saltsman	October 27, 2009	121
A new maintenance robot built by the Tensai threatens to make life extremely hard for various tribes around town. When it is hijacked by Vertex's henchbots, things get tricky for Spin and the FCPD too.
22	"Ajax"	Chris Roy	November 3, 2009	122
The city gets a glimpse of its newest transportation system when the Ajax trax are unveiled, but when Phaze gets involved, things get complicated quickly.
23	"Vett"	Terry Saltsman	November 10, 2009	123
Vertex's old ally Vett shows up in Flip City ready to mix things up, giving the FCPD more trouble than they can handle. Meanwhile, Spin fights against his own predicament to break free and save the city from certain doom.
24	"Prophecies and Guesstimates"	Terry Saltsman	November 17, 2009	124
When Vett attacks the stadium to steal another artifact, it puts the FCPD on the defensive while trying to keep the public calm. Meanwhile, Spin looks for answers about Vertex's past, and ends up with even more about himself when the Zogensha tribe gets involved.
25	"Paradigm Shift (Part 1)"	MCM	November 24, 2009	125
Vertex and Vett launch a major assault on the FCPD to claim the last artifact and take over the city. Meanwhile, Spin works to uncover the truth about his past and to figure out what Vertex's plan is. With the final artifact in Vertex's reach, it is up to Spin, Penny and the rest of the FCPD to stop the city from falling.
26	"Paradigm Shift (Part 2)"	MCM	November 24, 2009	126
The Kei'zatsu tribe struggles to defeat Vertex and Vett without Pounder's leadership, while Spin goes straight to the source to put an end to his troubles once and for all. Spin also discovers his tribe's name and information about his past.

== Production ==
RollBots was first announced in 2008. The series was originally planned to be produced over five seasons, but due to budget problems, it was cancelled after only one.

== Broadcast and release ==
RollBots premiered on YTV in Canada on February 7, 2009. The series first aired on The CW4Kids in the United States on September 19 of the same year.

The series is currently available for streaming in the United States on Ameba TV.

== International versions ==
Country	Title	Channel
Arabic	فرقة المجازفين	Ajyal TV; Toyor Al-Janah
French	Les Roltronics	Gulli
Hebrew	רולבוטס	Arutz HaYeladim
Italian	RollBots	Italia 1
Portuguese (Brazil)	RollBots	Gloob
Portuguese (Portugal)	RolaBôs	SIC K
Spanish (Latin America)	RollBots	ZAZ
Spanish (Spain)	RollBots	Clan TV

== RollBots Online ==
The official website of the show is operated by Xenophile Media. It currently has three main interactive sections:

- FCPD Database: A collection of files on the various characters from the show, it also contains "classified information".
- HoloGrid: A map of Flip City. In the show, it is used by Penny to identify problems. Online, it has links to games known as "missions". The current missions are Tribe Challenge, Rush Hour Racing, Kei'zatsu Academy, and Spinball.
- FCPD Mainframe: Details like the leaderboard are displayed here. Individual points and money (known as Flip Chips) are also shown here.

There is also an application that allows visitors (who are members of YTV.com) to create and customize their very own RollBot.

Another feature of the website is the Danuga translator. Danuga is the language of the RollBots. The translator allows visitors to translate English words and phrases into Danuga, and provides the correct pronunciation in Danuga.
