= Helen Leadbeater =

Helen Leadbeater may refer to:

- Helen Leadbeater, birth name of politician, Jo Cox
- Helen Leadbeater, writer on Jupiter Moon
