= Exa TV =

- Country: Mexico
- Broadcast area: Mexico
- Headquarters: Mexico City

Programming
- Language: Spanish
- Picture format: 480i (SDTV)

Ownership
- Owner: MVS Comunicaciones
- Sister channels: MVS TV; Cinelatino; Multicinema; Multipremier; ZAZ; Antena 3

History
- Launched: 2005; 21 years ago

Links
- Website: Exa TV

Exa TV is a Mexican 24/7 nonstop music video cable television network owned by MVS Comunicaciones. The cable network was launched in Mexico in 2005. In Mexico it is available through MASTV wireless cable television and Dish Mexico. The music videos are Top 40 format without commercials much like the music its sister radio network Exa FM.
