= MVS TV =

Mexican cable television channel

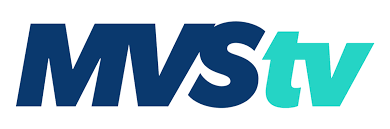
- Country: Mexico
- Broadcast area: Mexico
- Headquarters: Mexico City

Programming
- Language: Spanish
- Picture format: 1080i (HDTV)

Ownership
- Owner: MVS Comunicaciones
- Sister channels: Cinelatino; Exa TV; Multicinema; Multipremier

History
- Replaced: Multicanal (1989–1992); AS (1992–1996); MAS (1996–2001)
- Former names: 5INCUENTAYDO2 (2001–2006); 52MX (2006–2018)

Links
- Website: mvstv.com

Availability

Terrestrial
- Various Multimedios Televisión stations, including Mexico City: 6.4

MVS TV (stylized MVStv) is a Mexican general entertainment programming cable television network owned by MVS Comunicaciones. The cable channel was launched along with the wireless cable television company MVS Multivision in Mexico City, now called MASTV. An associated broadcast subscription television service in the Mexico City area has been the subject of litigation since the early 2000s as part of MVS's bid to convert the concession to allow broadcast, non-pay television services over the channel.

== History ==
=== Television channel launch ===
On September 1, 1989, MVS launched the Multivisión MMDS wireless cable system, including a bouquet of original channels. One of them, Multicable, was the flagship offering, with a program lineup of foreign series dubbed into Spanish, a cartoon block and a news program hosted by Pedro Ferriz de Con; in addition to airing on its own MMDS system, it was added to the Mexico City cable system operated by Cablevisión, the cable TV arm of Televisa, with its 400,000 subscribers. The channel's name changed to AS in 1992 and then MAS in 1996. In the 1990s, AS/MAS was where Carmen Aristegui and Javier Solórzano would work together before branching off in their distinguished journalism careers; Ferriz de Con would leave in 1999, leaving the newscast with a skeleton crew for two months before Raul Peimbert was tapped to replace him. Additionally, MAS carried coverage of the 2000 Summer Olympics.

=== The Channel 52 saga ===
In 2000, Cablevisión received concessions to operate a pay television service over channels 46 and 52 in Mexico City. The original 2000 concession restricted Cablevisión to only providing one program service per channel and provided for transmission with an effective radiated power of 250,000 watts. The award of these concessions to Cablevisión had been contested by MVS since November 1994, with the company claiming that the award was illegal and would affect Multivisión. Ultimately, MVS was given operational control of channel 52. It announced it would use the channel to launch a new television service known as "5INCUENTAYDO2" (a stylized reading of "fifty-two", cincuenta y dos) effective October 1, 2001, and it even ran promos for channel 52 in the clear—in violation of the concession, which explicitly stipulated that only pay TV services could be provided. The channel went ahead on pay and cable systems (including MVS's own) as a replacement for MAS, with the name being shortened to 52MX in 2006.

In 2004, MVS received the concession itself as part of a settlement with Cablevisión. The first renewal of the concession, which expired in 2010, would be contested. The Secretariat of Communications and Transportation informed Cablevisión and MVS that their channel 46 and 52 concessions would not be renewed, as no application was filed in time. MVS challenged the SCT and won. On September 19, 2013, it received a renewal for the Channel 52 concession, with a wrinkle: the station would move from channel 52 to 51 in order to clear the 700 MHz band for use by future mobile services. The 2013 concession, with an expiration date in 2020, also specified the service's conversion to digital, with the use of ATSC A/70 conditional access technology and an effective radiated power of 100,000 watts. In 2015, the concession was transferred to a new MVS subsidiary, Comband, S.A. de C.V.

During this time, 52MX ran into additional headwinds as a consequence of MVS's decision to enter the satellite television business with Dish México. The highest-profile challenge came in July 2008, when within weeks of MVS being awarded the satellite concession, Cablevisión dropped four MVS channels, including 52MX.

While the concession continued to require the transmission of a pay TV service, its technical characteristics—similar to and in the same band as broadcast television—and the 2013 overhaul of Mexican broadcasting and telecommunications law prompted MVS to seek authorization to provide a non-pay broadcast service on channel 51. In November 2014, the Federal Telecommunications Institute (IFT) denied the request, saying that it was not possible for MVS to provide broadcast and pay services simultaneously, nor was it possible to provide multiple services over the 6 MHz channel per the concession; MVS immediately announced it would challenge the IFT's decision, winning a favorable ruling from the Supreme Court. In 2017, the matter came back to the IFT, and the IFT said no again, preferring that MVS instead bid in the IFT-6 television station auction that was in progress at the time. The MVS challenge would return again to the Supreme Court, which in October 2018 ruled in MVS's favor. MVS had argued that the 2013 telecommunications reform and the Ley Federal de Telecomunicaciones y Radiodifusión, signed into law in 2014, promoted the convergence of telecommunications and broadcasting services. The IFT complied with the court order by deeming the MVS application proper on January 23, 2019 and proceeded to grant it on February 20; in exchange for a one-time payment of 61 million pesos, MVS was allowed to add a broadcast service on its channel 2, with the callsign XHMVS-TDT being allocated.

In order to clear the 600 MHz band for additional mobile services, the IFT approved the substitution of VHF channel 2 for 51 in August 2018. At that time, it was noted by IFT commissioner María Elena Estavillo Flores that the pay television service provided over channel 51 had only three subscribers, the same number it had in 2014. Due to the transmission characteristics inherent in low-VHF broadcasting, MVS requested a switch to a high-VHF channel and was reassigned channel 7 in October 2019.

=== 52MX/MVS TV on Multimedios stations ===
In 2016, 52MX began to appear on broadcast television for the first time after MVS struck a deal for it to appear as the fourth subchannel of Multimedios Televisión stations in Monterrey and the state of Tamaulipas.

On November 5, 2018, 52MX was renamed MVS TV. The rebrand coincided with the launch of MVS TV on broadcast in Mexico City, as a subchannel of Multimedios station XHTDMX-TDT; this had been approved in June. On December 12, 2018, the IFT approved the further multiplexing of MVS TV on Multimedios stations in Guadalajara and Puebla.

RF	VC	Call sign	Location	ERP	Concessionaire
21	12.4	XHSAW-TDT	Sabinas Hidalgo, N.L. Monterrey, Nuevo Leon	6.675 kW; 52.5 kW	Televisión Digital
25	6.4	XHVTU-TDT	Ciudad Victoria, Tamaulipas	20 kW	Multimedios Televisión
15	6.4	XHVTV-TDT	Matamoros, Tamaulipas	15 kW	Televisión Digital
26	6.4	XHNAT-TDT	Nuevo Laredo, Tamaulipas	54.34 kW	Multimedios Televisión
14	6.4	XHTAO-TDT	Tampico, Tamaulipas	12.5 kW	Multimedios Televisión
27	6.4	XHTDMX-TDT	Ciudad De Mexico	170 kW	Television Digital
34	6.4	XHTDJA-TDT	Guadalajara, Jalisco	200.009 kW	Television Digital
15	6.4	XHMTPU-TDT	Puebla, Puebla	122.5 kW	Multimedios Television

== Programming ==
MVS TV is a general entertainment channel with a wide variety of entertainment programming. In 2018, roughly 70 percent of its programming was produced in-house, with the remaining 30 percent provided by independent companies. In addition to its own newscasts shared with MVS Radio, MVS TV carries the news programs of Uno TV, owned by América Móvil.
