= Multipremier =

- Country: Mexico
- Broadcast area: Latin America
- Headquarters: Mexico City

Programming
- Language: Spanish
- Picture format: 480i (SDTV)

Ownership
- Owner: MVS Comunicaciones
- Sister channels: 52MX; Cinelatino; Exa TV; Multicinema; ZAZ; Antena 3

History
- Launched: October 1, 1992; 33 years ago

Links
- Website: www.multipremier.com.mx

Multipremier (also known as MP) is a Mexican love and drama movie cable television network owned by MVS Comunicaciones. At midnight Monday to Saturday the channel transmits softcore porn movies. The channel is available on MASTV wireless cable television service and Dish Mexico in Mexico and DirecTV Latin America in Central and South America.

== Signal structure ==
- Pan-regional signal: covers all Latin American and the Caribbean countries (except Brazil and Cuba). Use as reference the timetables of Mexico City (UTC-6), Bogotá (UTC-5) and Buenos Aires (UTC-3).
