= Abu Julia =

Palestinian chef (born 1987)

- محمد اسبيتة
- Born: Muhammad Sbeita; 1987 (age 38–39); Gaza, Palestine
- Status: Divorced
- Occupations: Chef, social media personality
- Years active: 2020–present
- Known for: Cooking videos
- Children: Kayan (Khalid)

Muhammad Sbaita (Arabic: محمد اسبيتة), also known as Abu Julia (Arabic: أبو جوليا), is a Palestinian chef and social media star. He is notable for his cooking videos, and was described by Al Jazeera as "the most famous Arab chef on Facebook".

== Life ==
Sbaita was born in Gaza, Palestine, and lived there continuously until the age of 27. His father is a blacksmith, with whom he worked for around 12 years. He learned to cook at the age of thirteen, with the help of his grandmother, during a period when his mother was unwell. He has a degree in English literature, and has worked as a translator and editor. He moved to London in 2017 to be with his wife, who is a doctor completing a postgraduate medical degree in the UK.

During his time in London, he worked as a translator, though his interest in cooking led him to work in one of Jamie Oliver's restaurants for a year and a half.

== Online career ==
Sbeita published his first video under the pseudonym Abu Julia to Facebook on August 17, 2020. He describes video editing as a skill he had learned during the first COVID-19 lockdown in the United Kingdom. Prior to this, he describes experimenting with short phone-recorded videos on a personal account.

Many of his videos demonstrate dishes from across the Arab world, with a particular focus on Levantine cuisine, though he also cooks a range of European and Asian dishes. He said he was initially encouraged to focus on Palestinian cuisine, but he decided otherwise in order to broaden his audience, saying that the biggest propaganda for Palestinian cooks would be for him to reach notoriety through cooking a range of foods. He has discussed the tension between preserving traditional recipes and techniques and adapting new versions, particularly with regard to allergy sufferers and people living in the diaspora without access to traditional ingredients.

Sbeita's followers are international, with the greatest number from Egypt, Jordan, Palestine and Iraq, and are predominantly women. He has been interviewed and profiled by a range of Arabic-language media platforms, including Al Jazeera, Sky News Arabia, Al-Quds Al-Arabi, Amman TV, Al-Arabiye and Al-Mamlaka. He is known for using the phrase "our dear ones" (Arabic: "حبايبنا اللزم", romanized: ḥabaibna al'lazm) in his videos, a term of endearment and affection in the Gazan dialect, and for a light-hearted and spontaneous style. He also often speaks about living conditions in Gaza and to support the Palestinian cause as a prominent member of the diaspora

In October 2021, Sbeita worked with the World Food Programme to promote its work in Palestine.
