= Cablemás =

Mexican regional telecommunications company

Cablemás, S.A. de C.V.
- Type: Limited liability company
- Industry: Telecommunications
- Founded: 1968; 58 years ago
- Defunct: 2015
- Headquarters: Colonia Juárez, Cuauhtémoc, Mexico City
- Products: Cable television Broadband internet VoIP; Wireless
- Parent: Televisa
- Website: cablemas.com

Cablemás was a Mexican regional telecommunications company, owned by Grupo Televisa. The company had a triple play-based service, consisting on subscription television, phone line and broadband internet offered in a single package deal. The company had its headquarters in Colonia Juárez, Cuauhtémoc, Mexico City.

In 2015, Cablemás's operations were rebranded as izzi Telecom following a corporate decision by Televisa to unify its regional-based TV providers, such as Cablecom and Cablevisión, under one sole brand.

== History ==
It is the second-largest cable operator in Mexico after Megacable. It has offered cable since the late 1980s, and broadband Internet since the late 1990s with approximately 953,000 cable TV customers, 325,000 high speed internet customers, and 180,000 telephony lines in 49 cities in Mexico (July 2010). Cablemas is also the first company to distribute VoIP in Tijuana, Baja California. VoIP is the spearhead of Cablemas's new promotionals.

Due to the previous laws in Mexico, in the past, telecommunication companies cannot provide more than two services. An example of this is the company Telnor, which provides telephones and Internet. Another example is Megacable, a company that provides cable and broadband Internet. To provide more services, Cablemas made an alliance with Axtel, a new telephone company operating from Monterrey, and the new Cablemas-Axtel Alliance was created with initially nearly 1,000 customers. Nowadays, Cablemás offers also fixed telephony at its own.

Cablemas bases its primary operation in the city of Tijuana, which is also the city that produces the highest influx of money into the company.

From 2015, Cablemás disappears as a trademark to make way for Izzi Telecom, following Televisa's strategy to unify its cable TV operations throughout the country under a single brand (just as Cablevisión).

== Controversy ==
Ongoing issues with service on Isla Mujeres and in parts of Cancún and Mérida have led to allegations of fraud against Cablemás. Tests performed by local municipalities show that advertised rates of 10 Mbit/s are actually capped as low as .5 or even .3 Mbit/s, or less than 5% of advertised speeds. The lack of a stable Internet connection, coupled with the company's virtual monopoly in isolated regions like Isla Mujeres, has resulted in unrest among businesses and residents. In December 2014, the municipality of Isla Mujeres vowed to investigate Cablemás and recommend sanctions to the governor of Quintana Roo.
