= Television in Jordan =

Television in Jordan is dominated by pan-Arab satellite, with terrestrial accounting for 16% of TV households in the country. There are 29 free-to-air satellite channels headquartered in Jordan. Pay-TV penetration is low, estimated at 4% in 2011.

The state broadcaster is the Jordan Radio and Television Corporation, which operates a domestic channel and broadcasts internationally via the Jordan Satellite channel.

The independent local channel Roya TV broadcasts local news, dramas and a variety of political, social and economic programmes.

== List of major channels ==
The number of satellite television channels broadcasting from Jordan reached 45 at the end of 2015. However, here is a list of the major Jordanian TV channels:

- Amman TV
- Al-Mamlaka
- Al-Yarmouk TV
- JRTV
- Jordan Series Channel
- Jordan News TV
- Alhakeka
- Nourmina Satellite Channel
- Roya TV
- Toyor Al-Janah
- Toyor Baby
