= Multicinema =

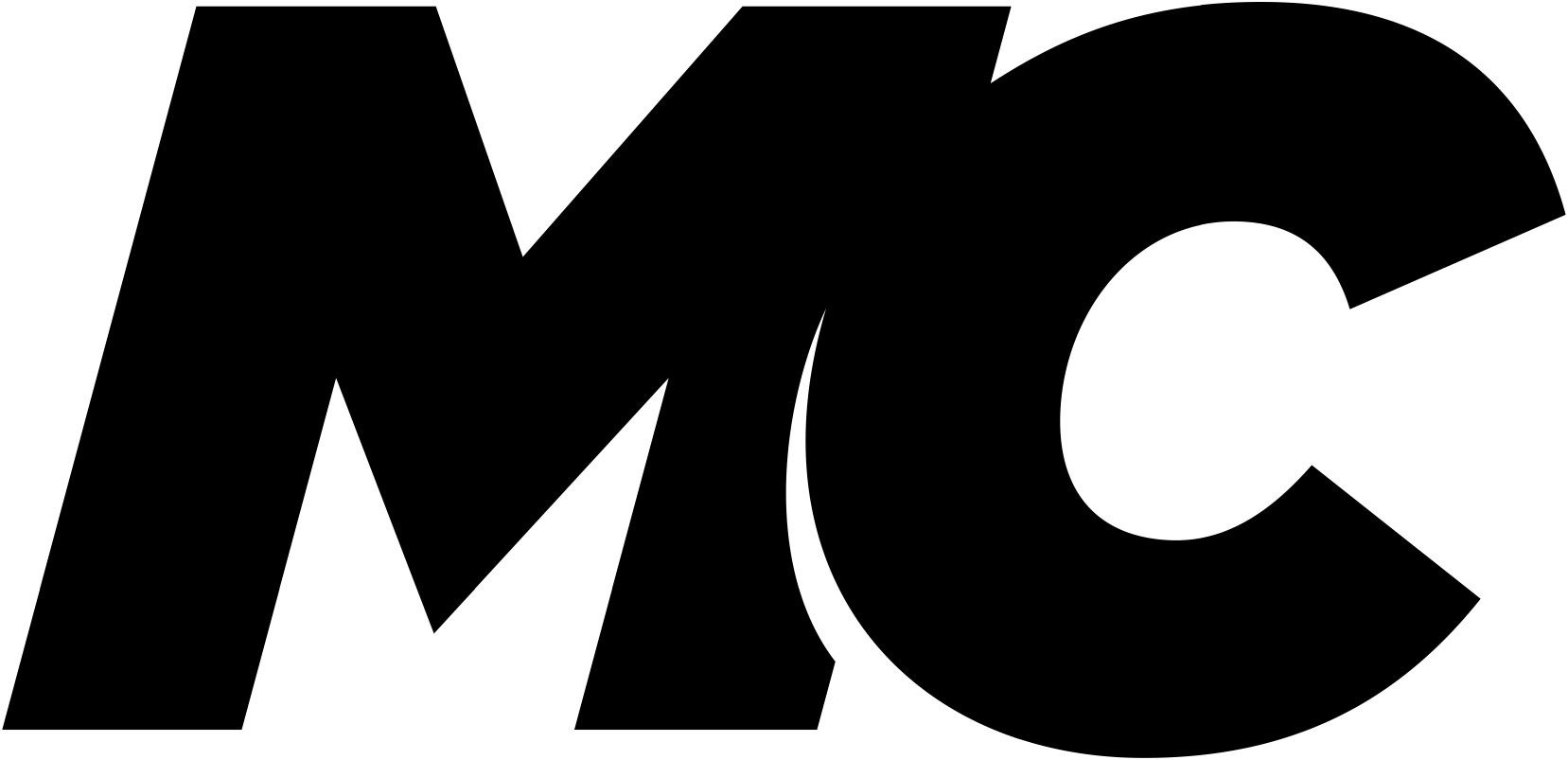
- Country: Mexico
- Broadcast area: Mexico
- Headquarters: Mexico City

Programming
- Language: Spanish
- Picture format: 480i (SDTV)

Ownership
- Owner: MVS Comunicaciones
- Sister channels: MVS TV; Cinelatino; Exa TV; Multipremier; ZAZ; Antena 3

Links
- Website: www.multicinema.com.mx

Multicinema (also known as MC) is a Mexican movie programming cable television network owned by MVS Comunicaciones. The cable network was launched along with the wireless cable television company MVS Multivision, now called MASTV in Mexico City.
