= When We Die As Martyrs =

Arabic song

"When We Die As Martyrs, We Go To Heaven" (Arabic: لما نستشهد بنروح الجنة) is a song produced by a Jordanian children's music troupe Toyor Al-Janah (Heavens Birds) and performed as a music video on a Jordanian television channel of the same name. Sung by young Arab children and led by Dima Bashar and her older brother Mohammed Bashar, in 2010 the song became a hit on YouTube as well as Arabic and worldwide websites. The song was harshly criticized by Saudi journalist Fawzia Nasir al-Naeem, who argues that it indoctrinates children into bloodshed and terrorism.

== Background ==
The choir Toyor Al Janah was founded in 1994 by Jordanian-Palestinian businessman Khaled Maqdad. The television channel, which began operating in 2008, was also established by Maqdad, who said: "The channel has captured the hearts of millions of children. It succeeds where the educational system has failed, such as multiplication table songs. It helps teachers work on it with the children."

Saudi journalist Fawzia Nasir al-Naeem wrote that the choir "is one of the most widely distributed children's song groups in the Arab world, and it seems to have crossed the ocean to Canada and Britain." Dr. Hamad Al-Majid, a journalist and former member of the official Saudi National Organization for Human Rights, writes: "Birds of Paradise produced content has swept Arab satellite channels, becoming some of the most popular programming for Arab children. This company pursues a policy of resisting Israeli occupation via producing innocent songs for children, and some of these songs which can be found on YouTube have been viewed by as many as four million people."

== Description ==
The song's video portrays Palestinian children playing, singing and dancing in a village, when they are gunned down by other children, dressed as Israeli soldiers. The children portraying Israeli settlers are wearing yarmulkes.

The song begins with a young girl singing: "When we seek martyrdom, we go to heaven. You tell us we're small, but from this way of life we have..."

As the video progresses, a young man continues the song: "Children, we must keep our religious commandments. There is no god but Allah, and Allah loves shaheeds" (Islamic martyrs).

== Gaza City concerts ==
In August 2010, Toyor Al Janah gave two live performances in Gaza City, where Muqdad, the founder of the group, attended a formal welcoming ceremony in the honor of the choir. Muqdad said that the concert would "affirm to the entire world the right of the children of Palestine to live in freedom and dignity."

The concerts were performed during an Islamic music festival, and both were attended by thousands of people.
