= MVS Comunicaciones =

Mexican media conglomerate

Grupo MVS
- Industry: Mass media
- Founded: January 15, 1967; 59 years ago
- Founder: Joaquín Vargas Gómez
- Headquarters: Mexico City, Mexico
- Area served: Latin America
- Services: Network Television; Pay Television; Radio Networks; Internet; Advertisement; Editorial
- Website: www.grupomvs.com

Grupo MVS (MVS) is a Mexican media conglomerate. The company owns MASTV, MVS Radio operator of four national radio networks, MVS Televisión operator and distributor of seven pay television networks, E-Go wireless broadband internet and Dish México.

== Pay television ==
=== Dish México ===
The main MVS pay television service is Dish México. Dish México is a company that operates a subscription satellite television service in Mexico. On December 1, 2008, Dish México began to operate in Mexico, after an agreement between Dish Network and MVS. Since 2022 MVS has owned 100% of Dish México. Prior to that, Echostar owned 49% and MVS owned 51% of Dish México. All of Dish México's channels programming are dubbed or subtitled in Spanish or originally Spanish language. Dish does not beam Televisa or TV Azteca network locals due to a dispute between Dish and Televisa. Televisa wants to charge Dish México per subscriber for its feeds of free over the air Televisa networks. Dish, however, leases an HD receiver with a terrestrial antenna input which when connected to an over the air antenna picks up digital local stations signals free of charge.

=== MASTV ===
Logo for MASTV

MVS also owns MASTV, a wireless cable television company. The wireless cable company offered 17 channels to 11 cities in Mexico; Mexico City, Guadalajara, Leon, Mérida, Monterrey, Pachuca, Queretaro, San Luis Potosi, Toluca, Tuxtla Gutierrez, and Villahermosa. The system started operations on September 1, 1989 as MVS Multivisión in Mexico City. It later expanded to 10 other markets across Mexico. In 2002, MVS Multivision changed its name to MASTV. Finally, after the acquisition by Dish, MASTV ceased operations in July 2014

== MVS Televisión ==
MVS owns MVS Televisión that operates and distributes seven pay television networks; MVS TV, a general entertainment network, Exa TV, a music video network, MC, an American movie network, Multipremier, an international movie network, Cinelatino, a Spanish-speaking world movie network, Claro Sports, a sports network, and distributes Antena 3 Internacional in Latin America, a Spanish pay TV network. From 1991 until July 31, 2012, MVS owned and operated the children-oriented channel ZAZ. All seven television networks are available through Dish México and MASTV.

| Network | Programming |
|---|---|
| MVS TV | General |
| Antena 3 Internacional | General from Spain |
| Cinelatino | Latin American and Spanish movies |
| Exa FM | Top 40 music videos |
| MC | American movies from the 1980s, 1990s and 2000s |
| Multipremier | More recent American movies, international movies and concerts |
| Claro Sports | Sports and sport-related programming |

== MVS Radio ==
MVS Radio operates 4 international radio networks owned by MVS Comunicaciones. These networks are Exa FM, La Mejor, MVS Noticias, and FM Globo. These networks broadcast in various countries including Argentina, Costa Rica, Ecuador, El Salvador, Honduras, Mexico, Panama, and the United States. All MVS owned radio networks are available on Dish México.

| Network | Programming |
|---|---|
| Exa FM | Top 40 |
| FM Globo | Spanish romantic ballads |
| La Mejor | Mexican Regional |
| MVS Noticias | News and Talk |

== Internet ==
Logo for MVS from 1989 to 2002

MVS offers wireless broadband internet via microwaves called E-Go with the use of a USB modem. The service is available in Mexico City, Monterrey, Toluca, and Guadalajara.

== Education ==
In 2018, MVS bought the Universidad Tecnológica Americana (Uteca), a private university located in Avenida de los Insurgentes and Viaducto Miguel Alemán.
