= Al-Yarmouk TV =

Al-Yarmouk TV قناة اليرموك
- Country: Jordan
- Broadcast area: MENA

Programming
- Language(s): Arabic
- Picture format: HDTV

History
- Launched: 2012

Al-Yarmouk TV (Arabic:قناة اليرموك) is a Jordanian television channel affiliated with the Muslim Brotherhood. It was established in 2012.

== History ==
The channel was broadcast on Nilesat until May 2024, when it was shut down by the Jordanian Government. It was previously closed in 2015 for broadcasting without a license. Yarmouk TV has aired content from Hamas affiliated Al-Aqsa TV after it was shut down by Eutelsat.

== See also ==
- Television in Jordan
- Assabeel
