= Steve Priestley =

British disc jockey

Steve Priestley is a British disc jockey, who used to work for Magic 105.4 in London.

== Career ==
He first came to prominence in the early 1990s as the voice over for an ITV programme on Saturdays called Movies, Games and Videos. The show overviewed games, movies and videos and started life as Movies, Movies, Movies.

In 1993, he joined BRMB in Birmingham, where he presented a regular show and was part of the line up for five years. While working at the station, he also became a stand-in presenter for the Network Chart whenever its presenter, Neil Fox was away. In addition to this, he also did two stints at Fox FM in Oxford before moving to Magic.

He originally presented Magic 105.4's weekend afternoon show, before taking over the drivetime show, replacing Graham Dene who left the station in September 2007 to join rival 102.2 Smooth Radio as its new breakfast presenter. From early 2009 he took over the station's weekend breakfast show. He also covered for Neil Fox on Magic's breakfast show whenever Fox is away. He left Magic in 2009. He then worked for Hallam FM, 96.3 Radio Aire and 96.9 Viking FM presenting Sunday to Thursday late nights. He left in March 2013.

Steve covered Smooth East Midlands drivetime in April 2017.

From 2017 up until its 2020 demise, Priestley was a network presenter for The Breeze (radio network), a network of Soft AC radio stations in the South West and East of England.

On 1 September 2020, Priestley began hosting the regional afternoon show for Greatest Hits Radio Yorkshire (GHR). and hosted GHR Yorkshire's regional show until Bauer removed GHR's regional programmes in England in November 2024.
