= Jupiter Moon =

Science fiction television series

- Title Card
- Genre: Science fiction, soap opera
- Created by: William Smethurst
- Country of origin: United Kingdom
- Original language: English
- No. of episodes: 150

Production
- Producer: William Smethurst
- Running time: 24 minutes
- Production company: Primetime-Andromeda in association with BSB

Original release
- Network: Galaxy; Sci Fi Channel
- Release: 26 March – 30 November 1990 and 22 January – 19 February 1996

Jupiter Moon is a science fiction soap opera television series first broadcast by British Satellite Broadcasting's Galaxy channel in 1990. 150 episodes were commissioned and made, but only the first 108 were broadcast before the closure of BSB. Episodes 109–150 were first shown in the UK on the Sci Fi Channel in 1996.

== Premise ==
The series is set in the year 2050 and concentrates on the spaceship Ilea in semi-permanent orbit above the space city on Jupiter's moon Callisto. The Ilea is home to a university and many of the programme's main plot strands revolve around the lives of the students, helping the programme to deal with more mundane issues despite its far-flung setting. A secondary plot deals with an attempt to travel to the stars known as the Daedalus Project.

== Cast ==
1: Andy Rashleigh as Eliot Creasy and Jason Durr as Alex Hartman. 2: Richard Lintern as James Bromwich and Anna Chancellor as Mercedes Page. 3: The Ilea. 4: Nikki Brooks as Herlinde Gothard and Karen Murden as Sara Robbins.

The cast included:

- Richard Derrington as Charles Brelan (Professor)
- Anna Chancellor as Mercedes Page (Post-Grad)
- Alison Dowling as Rebecca Harvey (Bursar)
- Carolyn Backhouse as Rosie Greenwood (Bursar)
- Andy Rashleigh as Eliot Creasy (Captain)
- Phil Willmott as Finbow Lewis (First Officer)
- Richard Hainsworth as Paul Fitzroy Drummond (Visiting Flight Officer)
- Christopher Simon as Christophe Chazalon (Doctor)
- Kathryn Hurlbutt as Harriet Bullock (Principal)
- Mark Jax as Paul Lockwood (Principal)
- Fiona Sinnott as Natasha Kovitsky (Captain)
- Charlotte Martin as the voice of Petra (Ship's Computer)
- Nicola Wright as Victoria Frobisher (Student)
- Lucy Benjamin as Fiona McBride (Student)
- Daniel Beales as Daniel Wetherby (Student)
- Suzy Cooper as Melody Shaw (Student)
- Anna Pernicci as Anna Begani (Student)
- Karen Murden as Sara Robbins (Student)
- Fay Masterson as Gabriella Tanzi (Student)
- Jamie Glover as Philippe Gervais (Student)
- Jim Shepley as Jim Hawkins (Student)
- Cheryl Martin as Jenny Fletcher (Student)
- Richard Lintern as James Bromwich (Post-Grad)
- Ashley Russell as Jean-Francois Baul (Post-Grad)
- Jason Durr as Alex Hartmann (Engineer)
- Nick Moran as Zadock Wilkinson (Student)
- Peter Polycarpou as Jorge Amado (Captain of the Santa Maria)
- Caroline Evans as Chantal de Gracy (Post-Grad)
- Dominic Arnold as Piers Gilpin (Doctor)
- Andrew Read as Tim Shaw (Student)
- Nikki Brooks as Herlinde Gothard (Student)
- Terry Molloy as Pegleg Johnson (Commander)

== Production ==
The series was created and produced by William Smethurst, a former long-standing editor of British radio soap The Archers and was recorded at the studios of Central Television in Birmingham. Many of the cast and writers also came from The Archers.

The budget was £6m for 150 episodes.

Dr Bob Parkinson of British Aerospace designed the spaceship Ilea using European Space Agency/NASA projections.

It was a Primetime-Andromeda Production in association with BSB.

=== Name derivations ===
The space station Ilea was named after the then-recently abolished Inner London Education Authority. The character Phillipe Gervais was named after associate producer Jane Fallon's partner Ricky Gervais.

== Broadcast ==
Jupiter Moon was commissioned to fulfil the perceived need for a soap opera in British Satellite Broadcasting's line-up and, as such, it was shown three times a week (on Mondays, Wednesdays, and Fridays at 6.30 pm), with an omnibus edition at weekends on BSB's Galaxy channel from 26 March until 30 November 1990. 150 episodes were commissioned and made, but only the first 108 were broadcast by BSB. The series was curtailed owing to the merger between BSB and Sky Television plc and the subsequent cessation of the Galaxy channel. Sky was unable to continue the broadcast of the series, as, unlike BSB, Sky's transmission area covered various European territories where Jupiter Moon was already being shown. The later episodes were eventually shown in the UK on the Sci Fi Channel between 22 January and 19 February 1996, as part of a complete run of the series.

The programme was also broadcast by television channels in countries including Germany, Austria, Switzerland, Greece, Jamaica, Zambia, Gibraltar and several of the Gulf States.

The soap was screened on GBC TV (Gibraltar television) ahead of its premiere on BSB's own Galaxy channel. The soap was seen in the British Overseas Territory every Tuesday, Thursday and Saturday at 7.30 pm, having taken the slot formerly occupied by EastEnders which had become too expensive for GBC TV.

== List of episodes ==
=== Galaxy (1990) ===
The first UK broadcast of episodes 1–108 was on BSB's Galaxy channel in 1990.

No.	UK airdate	Writer	Synopsis	UK DVD	US DVD
Volume 1: The New Frontier
1	Monday 26 March 1990	William Smethurst	The staff and students prepare for New Year's Eve 2049.	1	1
2	Wednesday 28 March 1990	William Smethurst	Gantry 4 is put into quarantine.	1	1
3	Friday 30 March 1990	Julian Spilsbury	Finbow thinks he has found a black hole.	1	1
4	Monday 2 April 1990	Helen Leadbeater	Finbow tries to locate the abnormality.	1	1
5	Wednesday 4 April 1990	Margaret Phelan	Victoria plans to leave.	1	1
6	Friday 6 April 1990	Julian Spilsbury	All communication is lost, preventing Finbow contacting the Valencia.	1	1
7	Monday 9 April 1990	Helen Leadbeater	There is a strange signal coming from an airlock.	1	1
8	Wednesday 11 April 1990	Helen Leadbeater	Alex Hartman arrives.	1	1
9	Friday 13 April 1990	Margaret Phelan	Finbow thinks something is eating through the shields.	1	1
10	Monday 16 April 1990	Margaret Phelan	Finbow thinks the Ilea is under attack.	1	1
11	Wednesday 18 April 1990	Julian Spilsbury	James gets into trouble on an EVA.	1	1
12	Friday 20 April 1990	Julian Spilsbury	Naiad 10 is evacuated.	1	1
13	Monday 23 April 1990	Helen Leadbeater	The ship is in danger of running out of air.	2	1
14	Wednesday 25 April 1990	Margaret Phelan	Alex plans to steal the command module.	2	1
15	Friday 27 April 1990	Robert Smith	Eliot and Mercedes try to fix Petra by erasing some files.	2	1
16	Monday 30 April 1990	Julian Spilsbury	The Ilea is caught up a cloud of plasma and gas.	2	1
17	Wednesday 2 May 1990	Nick Warburton	Rosie tries to get Tim to override Petra.	2	1
18	Friday 4 May 1990	Diana Souhami	The ventilation system is restored.	2	1
19	Monday 7 May 1990	Margaret Phelan	Eliot refuses to re-take command.	2	1
20	Wednesday 9 May 1990	Margaret Phelan	The Ilea comes through the cloud.	2	1
21	Friday 11 May 1990	Charles Hodges	Contact is made with Space City.	3	1
22	Monday 14 May 1990	Joanne Maguire	Everyone is excited to be returning to Callisto.	3	1
23	Wednesday 16 May 1990	Julian Spilsbury	Finbow is charged with mutiny.	3	1
24	Friday 18 May 1990	Julian Spilsbury	The Ilea arrives at Space Harbour.	3	1
25	Monday 21 May 1990	Andy Rashleigh	Eliot plans to share any blame with Finbow.	3	1
26	Wednesday 23 May 1990	Joanne Maguire	Herlinde plans a smear campaign against Eliot.	3	1
27	Friday 25 May 1990	Nick Warburton	Harriet fails to join the board of inquiry into the mutiny.	3	1
28	Monday 28 May 1990	Veronica Rumble	Harriet tries to persuade Jean-François to go to Mars.	3	1
29	Wednesday 30 May 1990	Margaret Phelan	Tim has problems with a restricted file.	3	1
30	Friday 1 June 1990.	Graham Harvey	Brelan wants the Ilea's upper stage.	3	1
31	Monday 4 June 1990	Julian Spilsbury	The Ilea is about to be dismantled.	4	1
32	Wednesday 6 June 1990.	Diana Souhami	Eliot and Finbow are back in charge.	4	1
33	Friday 8 June 1990	Charles Hodges	Harriet is angry that students are missing lectures.	4	1
34	Monday 11 June 1990	Margaret Phelan	Brelan tells James the truth about the 2016 Mars mission.	4	1
35	Wednesday 13 June 1990	Margaret Phelan	Brelan wants to use the Ilea to help scan Amalthea.	4	1
36	Friday 15 June 1990	Julian Spilsbury	The Ilea is transferred to Daedalus Command.	5	1
Volume 2: The Pirates of Leda
37	Monday 18 June 1990	Steve May	The Ilea heads to Amalthea.	5	2
38	Wednesday 20 June 1990	Nick Warburton	Finbow realises a spacesuit is sending the mayday.	5	2
39	Friday 22 June 1990	Joanne Maguire	Radiation leaks into the dome.	5	2
40	Monday 25 June 1990	Diana Souhami	The Ilea is caught in a sulphur storm.	5	2
41	Wednesday 27 June 1990	Diana Souhami	The crew tries to dock with the Copernicus.	6	2
42	Friday 29 June 1990	Graham Harvey	Docking attempts fail.	6	2
43	Monday 2 July 1990	Nicholas McInerny	Cats reaches the Copernicus and finds it badly damaged.	6	2
44	Wednesday 4 July 1990	Julian Spilsbury	Cats reaches the surviving crewman.	6	2
45	Friday 6 July 1990	Margaret Phelan	The crewman tells the story of the Copernicus.	6	2
46	Monday 9 July 1990	Margaret Phelan	The Ilea leaves Amalthea.	7	2
47	Wednesday 11 July 1990	Julian Spilsbury	Herlinde is warned off Alex.	7	2
48	Friday 13 July 1990	Julian Spilsbury	Rebecca starts her new job as bursar.	7	2
49	Monday 16 July 1990	Joanne Maguire	Melody decides to pursue her singing career.	7	2
50	Wednesday 18 July 1990	Joanne Maguire	Eliot looks for a new job.	7	2
51	Friday 20 July 1990	Nick Warburton	Brelan tells Tim he can join Daedalus.	8	2
52	Monday 23 July 1990	Graham Harvey	An allergy may stop Tim going to Mars.	8	2
53	Wednesday 25 July 1990	Graham Harvey	Rebecca fakes Tim's blood test.	8	2
54	Friday 27 July 1990	Diana Souhami	There's a farewell party for Tim and Fiona.	8	2
55	Monday 30 July 1990	Diana Souhami	Melody spends more time at the Stardust.	8	2
56	Wednesday 1 August 1990	Margaret Phelan	Piers locks Rebecca out of Medicom.	9	2
57	Friday 3 August 1990	Margaret Phelan	Stefan is concerned about Tim's test.	9	2
58	Monday 6 August 1990	Margaret Phelan	Finbow spots a mystery ship.	9	2
59	Wednesday 8 August 1990	Julian Spilsbury	The Santa Maria crew arouse suspicion.	9	2
60	Friday 10 August 1990	Julian Spilsbury	Amado seeks information on valuable metals.	9	2
61	Monday 13 August 1990	Nick Warburton	Finbow shares his concerns.	—	2
62	Wednesday 15 August 1990	Simon Frith	The Amazons board the Ilea.	—	2
63	Friday 17 August 1990	Simon Frith	The pirate ship seems to head to Ganymede.	—	2
64	Monday 20 August 1990	Diana Souhami	Finbow suspects the pirates have gone to Leda.	—	2
65	Wednesday 22 August 1990	Diana Souhami	Finbow is worried about Eliot and Mercedes' battle plans.	—	2
66	Friday 24 August 1990	Sue Teddern	Mercedes, Daniel and Jim plan to build a railgun.	—	2
67	Monday 27 August 1990	Joanne Maguire	Paul, the new principal, arrives.	—	2
68	Wednesday 29 August 1990	Joanne Maguire	Brelan offers to consider Finbow for Daedalus if he will co-operate.	—	2
69	Friday 31 August 1990	Ben Aaronovitch	Brelan and Mercedes do an EVA to check the railgun.	—	2
70	Monday 3 September 1990	Ben Aaronovitch	Brelan reveals that the Ilea is carrying nuclear missiles.	—	2
71	Wednesday 5 September 1990	Veronica Henry	The Santa Maria is sighted.	—	2
72	Friday 7 September 1990	Veronica Henry	Brelan asks Paul to do an EVA with him to repair the telescopes.	—	2
73	Monday 10 September 1990	Graham Harvey	The Santa Maria fires a missile.	—	2
74	Wednesday 12 September 1990	Graham Harvey	Eliot tries to begin negotiations with the Santa Maria.	—	2
75	Friday 14 September 1990	Julian Spilsbury	The Santa Maria attacks.	—	2
Volume 3: Ghost in the Machine
76	Monday 17 September 1990	Julian Spilsbury	There is chaos on the Ilea.	—	3
77	Wednesday 19 September 1990	Joanne Maguire	The damaged ship returns to Callisto.	—	3
78	Friday 21 September 1990	Jonathan Myserson	Paul tries to get the communications working.	—	3
79	Monday 24 September 1990	Jonathan Myserson	Brelan attempts to find a substitute for molybdenum.	—	3
80	Wednesday 26 September 1990	Ben Aaronovitch	Gaby and Philippe arrive.	—	3
81	Friday 28 September 1990	Ben Aaronovitch	Brelan stops Sabine selling her story about Daedalus.	—	3
82	Monday 1 October 1990	Helen Leadbeater	Mercedes finds Sabine ensconced with Brelan.	—	3
83	Wednesday 3 October 1990	Helen Leadbeater	Brelan stalls Sabine after Finbow's blunder.	—	3
84	Friday 5 October 1990	Graham Harvey	Brelan promises Sabine a scoop.	—	3
85	Monday 8 October 1990	Graham Harvey	Melody goes for counselling.	—	3
86	Wednesday 10 October 1990	Joanne Maguire	Victoria discovers molybdenum on Achilles G33.	—	3
87	Friday 12 October 1990	Joanne Maguire	Jean-François tries to say goodbye to Melody.	—	3
88	Monday 15 October 1990	Rowena Rumble	Finbow is outside, with vertigo.	—	3
89	Wednesday 17 October 1990	Margaret Phelan	Mercedes is declared unfit for work.	—	3
90	Friday 19 October 1990	Margaret Phelan	Eliot and Finbow discover there was a murder on the Achilles expedition.	—	3
91	Monday 22 October 1990	Julian Spilsbury	Speculation abounds after the mysterious sightings in the Dome.	—	3
92	Wednesday 24 October 1990	Julian Spilsbury	The ghostly face re-appears.	—	3
93	Friday 26 October 1990	Torrey Steed	Daniel works out what causes the apparitions.	—	3
94	Monday 29 October 1990	Jonathan Myerson	Petra keeps moving the Michaelangelo files.	—	3
95	Wednesday 31 October 1990	Ben Aaronovitch	Daniel and Finbow trigger a dangerous computer program.	—	3
96	Friday 2 November 1990	Joanne Maguire	Brelan and Finbow try to get rid of the Achilles file.	—	3
97	Monday 5 November 1990	Margaret Phelan	Drummond arrives, and the Ilea leaves for G33.	—	3
98	Wednesday 7 November 1990	Margaret Phelan	Anna reveals that Melody is pregnant.	—	3
99	Friday 9 November 1990	Veronica Henry	Paul and Mercedes do an EVA.	—	3
100	Monday 12 November 1990	Jonathan Myerson	Christophe has to operate on Mercedes.	—	3
101	Wednesday 14 November 1990	Julian Spilsbury	Brelan refuses Finbow's resignation.	—	3
102	Friday 16 November 1990	Julian Spilsbury	It is the day of Paul's funeral.	—	3
103	Monday 19 November 1990	Veronica Henry	The ship has a dangerous journey to asteroid G33.	—	3
104	Wednesday 21 November 1990	Joanne Maguire	All power must be turned off to stop the plasma cloud imploding.	—	3
105	Friday 23 November 1990	Torrey Steed	Gabriella stows away on the shuttle as Drummond goes to G33.	—	3
106	Monday 26 November 1990	Torrey Steed	Gabriella returns, and Brelan expels her.	—	3
107	Wednesday 28 November 1990	Helen Leadbeater	Drummond is stuck on G33.	—	3
108	Friday 30 November 1990	Helen Leadbeater	Melody decides to keep the baby.	—	3

=== Sci Fi Channel (1996) ===
The first UK broadcast of episodes 109–150 was on the Sci Fi Channel in 1996.

No.	UK airdate	Writer	Synopsis	UK DVD	US DVD
Volume 3: Ghost in the Machine (continued)
109	Monday 22 January 1996	Margaret Phelan	Gabriella's mother arrives.	—	3
110	Monday 22 January 1996	Margaret Phelan	Brelan takes over Physics Lab 3.	—	3
111	Tuesday 23 January 1996	Jonathan Myerson	The students occupy the lab.	—	3
112	Tuesday 23 January 1996	Joanne Maguire	Brelan threatens to expel all the students.	—	3
113	Wednesday 24 January 1996	Julian Spilsbury	The students lose enthusiasm for the occupation.	—	3
114	Wednesday 24 January 1996	Julian Spilsbury	Brelan learns of an explosion at the Interworld Chemical Plant.	—	3
Volume 4: Fires of Io
115	Thursday 25 January 1996	Joanne Maguire	Drummond tries to save the chemical plant survivors.	—	4
116	Thursday 25 January 1996	Torrey Steed	Finbow attempts a rescue.	—	4
117	Friday 26 January 1996	Helen Leadbeater	Finbow is nominated for a bravery award, and gets a new job.	—	4
118	Friday 26 January 1996	Helen Leadbeater	Brelan agrees to try to get Finbow's transfer reversed.	—	4
119	Monday 29 January 1996	Ben Aaronovitch	Anna tries to break up Sara and Jim's relationship.	—	4
120	Monday 29 January 1996	Ben Aaronovitch	Natasha is offered the position of captain of the Ilea.	—	4
121	Tuesday 30 January 1996	Joanne Maguire	The ship returns to Callisto.	—	4
122	Tuesday 30 January 1996	Joanne Maguire	Tim is suspected of stealing a hamster from a research lab.	—	4
123	Wednesday 31 January 1996	Julian Spilsbury	Tim's hamster escapes.	—	4
124	Wednesday 31 January 1996	Julian Spilsbury	Natasha decides to fumigate.	—	4
125	Thursday 1 February 1996	Margaret Phelan	Finbow invites Natasha to dinner.	—	4
126	Thursday 1 February 1996	Margaret Phelan	Space City Security come to remove the hamster.	—	4
127	Friday 2 February 1996	Helen Leadbeater	Victoria decides to apply for a job on Ceres.	—	4
128	Friday 2 February 1996	Helen Leadbeater	Brelan announces he will run the college himself.	—	4
129	Monday 5 February 1996	Torrey Steed	Anna is disappointed not to receive her degree early.	—	4
130	Monday 5 February 1996	Torrey Steed	Anna plans revenge on Fiona.	—	4
131	Tuesday 6 February 1996	Ben Aaronovitch	Brelan announces the ship is to go to Pasiphae for six months.	—	4
132	Tuesday 6 February 1996	Ben Aaronovitch	Evidence of life is found on Ariel 9.	—	4
133	Wednesday 7 February 1996	Margaret Phelan	The Stardust Café has been closed.	—	4
134	Wednesday 7 February 1996	Margaret Phelan	Mercedes is jealous of Natasha's popularity.	—	4
135	Thursday 8 February 1996	Joanne Maguire	Anna thinks she has seen a miracle.	—	4
136	Thursday 8 February 1996	Joanne Maguire	Natasha and Mercedes argue.	—	4
137	Friday 9 February 1996	Julian Spilsbury	Anna realises who she saw.	—	4
138	Friday 9 February 1996	Julian Spilsbury	Brelan allows Tranquility to stay.	—	4
139	Monday 12 February 1996	Helen Leadbeater	Melody is jealous of Tranquility.	—	4
140	Monday 12 February 1996	Helen Leadbeater	Jean-Francois' grant is suspended.	—	4
141	Tuesday 13 February 1996	Veronica Henry	Finbow falls ill.	—	4
142	Tuesday 13 February 1996	Joanne Maguire	Natasha is angry with Finbow.	—	4
143	Wednesday 15 February 1996	Joanne Maguire	Tranquility overrides Petra.	—	4
144	Wednesday 15 February 1996	Jane Fallon	Byron wants to be entertainment manager.	—	4
145	Thursday 16 February 1996	Margaret Phelan	Finbow and Natasha are marooned.	—	4
146	Thursday 16 February 1996	Diane Culverhouse	The Illea returns to Hymalia.	—	4
147	Friday 17 February 1996	Veronica Henry	Jim and Anna fall ill.	—	4
148	Friday 17 February 1996	Ben Aaronovitch	Brelan tells Mercedes their relationship is over.	—	4
149	Monday 19 February 1996	Rowena Rumble	Drummond has to do a dangerous EVA.	—	4
150	Monday 19 February 1996	William Smethurst	A fire breaks out and the Ilea is evacuated.	—	4

== DVDs ==
=== United Kingdom ===
Episodes 1 to 60 were released by Oracle Home Entertainment on Region 2 DVD in the UK in 9 volumes.

Volume	Episodes	Title
1	1–11	Invasion From Space
2	12–20	The Plasma Ball
3	21–30	Return to Space City
4	31–35	Mystery of Amalthea
5	36–40	Rescue the Copernicus!
6	41–45	Volcano
7	46–50	Stardust
8	51–55	Lost in Space
9	56–60	The Mystery Ship

=== United States ===
The entire series was released by Image Entertainment on Region 1 DVD in the US in 4 volumes.

Volume	Episodes	Title
1	1–36	The New Frontier
2	37–75	The Pirates of Leda
3	76–114	Ghost in the Machine
4	115–150	Fires of Io

== See also ==
- Project Daedalus – British space exploration project (1973–1978)
