= Movies, Games and Videos =

- Genre: Video games
- Narrated by: Steve Priestley
- Country of origin: United Kingdom
- Original language: English
- No. of series: 10

Production
- Running time: 30 minutes

Original release
- Network: ITV
- Release: 18 April 1992 – 6 February 2005

Movies, Games and Videos (originally called Movies, Movies, Movies) was a television programme shown on ITV in the United Kingdom throughout the 1990s and into the early 2000s. The show reviewed new releases of movies, games, and videos, and was originally voiced by Steve Priestley in an offscreen role. It was produced by production company Capricorn Programmes for LWT (later Yorkshire Television, also HTV, finally UTV) who syndicated the programme to a variety of countries. Local broadcasters were sent scripts and given the option to re-voice programme content if required.

The show also included reviews of new game systems, video game creators and conventions/shows.

A short-lived spin-off magazine was also produced.

== Scheduling ==
Movies, Games and Videos was not networked per se (not broadcast in a rigid timeslot on a specific day), but was shown in all regions to begin with. Initially this was on a Saturday lunchtime in a variety of slots - 12:30, 13:45, 15:10 etc. but gradually the scheduling varied wildly depending on each region. Some continued to broadcast it on a Saturday afternoon, whilst others began airing it in a 17:10 weekday slot, after CITV.

Though initially successful, the show was gradually dropped by most regions and by Spring 1998, only Anglia, Central HTV, Grampian Television, Meridian, Scottish Television, UTV and Westcountry Television were broadcasting the series until August 2001. From 2002 until February 2005 the series was only screened in Northern Ireland by the local contractor UTV.

It also aired on local television stations in its later years, such as TV12 in the Isle of Wight.
