= Toyor Al-Janah =

Jordanian TV channel

Toyor Al-Janah طيور الجنة
- Type: Children's television channel
- Country: Jordan
- Broadcast area: International
- Headquarters: Amman, Jordan

Programming
- Languages: Arabic; English
- Picture format: 4:3 (2008–2015); 16:9 (2015–present)

Ownership
- Owner: Khaled Miqdad
- Sister channels: Toyor Baby

History
- Launched: 20 December 1993 (original) (MENA); 25 January 2008; 18 years ago (relaunch) (MENA); 25 June 2008 (Peru); 13 October 2008 (United Kingdom); 1 December 2008 (France); 5 January 2009 (United States and Canada); 30 March 2019 (Turkey)
- Closed: 1 December 1998

Links
- Website: www.toyoraljanah.com

Toyor Al-Janah (Arabic: طيور الجنة) (meaning: "Heavens Birds") is a Jordanian satellite TV channel specialized for children, launched in 2008 via the Nilesat satellite, and is currently available on the Arabsat satellite. The channel is known for its children's songs and programs, and it relies on child presenters to easily communicate with young viewers through their peers, with their movements, playfulness, innocence, smiles, and interests. The channel's program is also characterized by a family atmosphere, helping children to see themselves through the stars of Toyor Al-Janah on the small screen.

Toyor Al-Janah troupe traveled to most Arab countries, presenting shows and singing in front of live audiences.

== Associated channels ==
Toyor Al-Janah 2: is a second channel affiliated with Toyor Al-Janah, it began broadcasting in 2011. It includes Video Clips, programs, cartoons, and other shows, and ended broadcasting in 2012.

Toyor Baby: A satellite channel aimed at children, managed and supervised by Khaled Miqdad, based in Amman, Jordan, with broadcasts from Bahrain. The channel offers songs and anthems for children.

=== On YouTube ===
Toyor Baby English: Toyor Al-Janah channel launched an English version of Toyor Baby, offering songs targeted at English-speaking children, continuing the channel's creative journey and reaching audiences around the world.

Toyor Baby Turkish: Toyor Al-Janah media group launched its new YouTube channel for Turkish-speaking audiences under the name “Bebek.” The new channel offers a large collection of exclusive children's songs produced by Toyor Al-Janah.

Toyor Baby French: Continuing its educational and entertaining mission, Toyor Al-Janah media group launched its new YouTube channel in French.

== History ==
Logo of Toyor Al-Janah from 1994 to 2008

Logo of Toyor Al-Janah from 2008 to 2015

In 1994, the Palestinian Jordanian Khaled Maqdad founded the children's choir Toyor al-Janah, which became highly successful. In 2008, Maqdad established the television channel of the same name. The headquarters is located in Amman, the capital of Jordan, while broadcasting takes place from Bahrain. The channel primarily features music videos for children. In addition to the TV program, Toyor al-Janah TV is also active online across various social media and video platforms, including YouTube, where it has over 30 million subscribers. Many videos reach hundreds of millions of views, with the music video “Mama Brought a Baby” (ماما جابت بيبي) by Jana Miqdad amassing over a billion views. Besides the Arabic content, there is also an English YouTube channel.

== Programming ==
Toyor Al-Janah's programming is very similar to the strand previously shown like "The House News" (أخبار الدار), "Just a moment" (لحظة بس), "Sing for us" (أنشد لنا), "On Air Together" (عالهوا سوا), "Khatawi Al-Silawi" (خطاوي السيلاوي) and many more then all cartoons.

== Controversies ==
In 2010, Toyor al-Janah released the music video “When We Die as Martyrs” (لما نستشهد بنروح الجنة), with then-ten-year-old Dima Bashar and her older brother Muhammad Bashar as the main singers. The song's lyrics addressed the Israeli-Palestinian conflict from a Palestinian perspective – both the singers and the channel's founder are Palestinian – where the children sang lines such as “When we die as martyrs, we go to heaven” and “There is no childhood without Palestine.” Additionally, they recited a prayer: “Oh God, grant victory to Islam and the Muslims. Oh God, help the children of Palestine.” The video also depicted battle scenes with children dressed as Israeli soldiers, who are shot at the end after having previously shot Palestinian children.

The song was viewed millions of times and made headlines in both Israel and the Arab world. Saudi journalist Fawzia Nasir al-Na’im sharply criticized the video, calling it an indoctrination of children. The video is no longer available on Toyor al-Janah's YouTube channel, but copies exist on YouTube. A few months later, Toyor al-Janah performed during a three-day visit to the Gaza Strip.

== Toyor Al-Janah Singer ==
=== Current ===
- Al-Waleed Miqdad
- Al-Mu'tasim-billah Miqdad
- Jana Miqdad
- Jad Miqdad
- Eyad Miqdad
- Sanad Miqdad
- Khaled Miqdad
- Murad Shareef
- Bara’a Al-Awaid
- Zinab Al-Makhal
- Mu’min Al-Jenani
- Ibrahim Al-Silawi
- Jwan Al-Silawi
- Lilian Al-Silawi
- Zain Miqdad
- Yara Miqdad
- Bayan Bayrouti (Singer of Toyor Baby & Toyor Al-Janah)

=== Formerly ===
- Dima Bashar
- Muhammad Bashar
- Omar Al-Saidie
- Lin Al-Saidie
- Ashraf Yousef
- Bilal Al-Kubaisi
- Amina Karam
- Layan Sameeh
- Taif Al-Zahrani
- Abd-Rauuf Al-Osairi
- Mustafa Al-Azawi
- Amal Qutami
- Dima Al-Saidie
- Osama Al-Nas'a
- Raghad Al-Wazan
- Mujahed Hisham
- Shehab Al-Sha'rani

== Some of the channel’s songs ==
1. “Yalla Party” (يلا حفلة) by the Toyor Al-Janah group
2. “Once We Went Out” (مرة طلعنا) by the Toyor Al-Janah group
3. “Dad’s Phone” (بابا تلفون) by the Toyor Al-Janah group
4. “Mom Brought a Baby” (ماما جابت بيبي) by Jana Miqdad
5. “Dad Brought Me a Balloon” (بابا جابلي بالون) by Jana Miqdad
6. “We’re Bored” (ملينا) by Bara’a Al-Awaid
7. “Today’s Eid” (اليوم عيد) by Jana Miqdad
8. “You Drove Me Crazy” (جننتوني) by Jana Miqdad
9. “Rumors” (الإشاعات) by Bara’a Al-Awaid
10. “Majina Majina” (ماجينا ماجينا) by the Miqdad family
11. “How Are You” (كيف الحال) by Jana Miqdad
12. “Mom and Dad” (ماما وبابا) by Jana Miqdad
13. “Oh Fountain of Tenderness” (يا نبع الحنان) (formerly 1994 by Toyor Al-Janah First) by the Miqdad family
14. "When We Die As Martyrs" (لما نستشهد بنروح الجنة) by Dima Bashar
