= Cinelatino =

- Country: Mexico
- Broadcast area: North America; South America
- Headquarters: Mexico City

Programming
- Language: Spanish
- Picture format: 480i (SDTV)

Ownership
- Owner: MVS Comunicaciones; Hemisphere Media Group (InterMedia Partners, 99.9%)
- Sister channels: MVS TV; Exa TV; Multicinema; Multipremier; Claro Sports; WAPA-TV; WAPA America; Pasiones; Televisión Dominicana; CentroAmerica TV; Canal 1 (Colombia)

History
- Launched: October 12, 1993 (33 years ago)

Links
- Website: Cinelatino

Availability

Streaming media
- Sling TV: Internet Protocol television
- FuboTV: IPTV
- Vidgo: IPTV
- YouTube TV: IPTV
- Roku: 610

Cinelatino is a Spanish-language movie channel based in Mexico and owned by MVS Comunicaciones & Hemisphere Media Group (99.9% owned by InterMedia Partners). The channel is available throughout Latin America, as well as the United States and Canada via cable, satellite, and IPTV services.

Cinelatino airs Hispanic films, featuring titles from Mexico, Latin America, and Spain. All movies are presented in their original format and without any commercial interruptions. Cinelatino also features behind-the-scenes footage, interviews with film stars, coverage of Spanish-language film festivals, and news related to the Hispanic film industry.

Cinelatino has a working relations with the Los Angeles–based production company, Plus Entertainment, headed by executive producer Pejman Partiyeli and producers Gonzalo Gonzalez and Rene Michelle Aranda. Plus Entertainment's annual slate of features is produced to target Cinelatino's niche market and has distributes filmes through US home-video and streaming outlets. Recent Plus Entertainment titles that have aired on Cinelatino include Cherry Red Kiss (Beso de cereza), Sins of a Call Girl (Pecados de una dama del noche), and Smile Now Cry Later (Sonríe hoy llora despues).

Plus Entertainment is currently developing Cinelatino's first ever television series.

In Canada, Cinelatino is distributed by Telelatino Network and is available from several cable and IPTV providers, including Rogers Cable, Vidéotron, Cogeco, and Bell Fibe TV.

== Signal structure ==
- United States signal: broadcast for U.S. audiences and also available in Puerto Rico. Schedules reference ET (UTC-5/-4 DST) and PT (UTC-8/-7 DST) of United States.
- Pan-regional signal: covers all Latin American, Canada and the Caribbean countries (except Brazil and Cuba). Schedule reference Mexico City (UTC-6), Bogotá (UTC-5), Vancouver (UTC-7), Toronto (UTC-5/-4 DST) and Buenos Aires (UTC-3).

== See also ==
- Cine Mexicano
- Narco film
