= Izzi Telecom =

Mexican cable system operator

Empresas Cablevisión SAB de CV
- Trade name: Izzi
- Type: Sociedad Ánonima Bursatil
- Traded as: BMV: CABLE
- Industry: Telecommunications
- Founded: October 3, 1960 (as Cablevisión); November 3, 2014 (as izzi)
- Headquarters: Mexico City, Mexico
- Area served: Mexico
- Products: Cable, telephone, Internet service provider
- Parent: Grupo Televisa
- Website: www.izzi.mx

izzi is a Mexican telecommunications company owned by Grupo Televisa and operated by Televisión Internacional, S.A. de C.V. It is listed on the Mexican Stock Exchange under the code CABLE. izzi provides telephone, Internet, cable TV and mobile services to individuals and companies with coverage in cities in Mexico.

== History ==
Cablevisión was founded on October 3, 1960, by a group of 10 people led by architect Benjamín Burillo Pérez. The first services were initiated on October 4, 1966 to link the Social Securities Clinics and its health sector dependencies with educational programs for surgeons. The company began operations on October 20, ahead of the 1968 Summer Olympics, which were to be held in two years. At the time, its coverage reached 124 kilometers, aiming at neighborhoods that were of the high society in Del Valle and Polanco, gaining 300 subscribers. After an agreement with Luz y Fuerza del Centro, S.A., on June 16, 1967, Cablevisión allowed the usage of its lamp posts to deliver the cable signals.

In 1969, the Communications and Transportation Secretary granted the company, then with 300 subscribers, temporary permission to install 124 kilometres (77 mi) of coaxial cable in Colonia Roma. That same year, Cablevisión became a part of Grupo Televisa, which was owned by businessman Emilio Azcárraga Milmo. By 1971, Cablevisión expanded its network to reach Lomas de Chapultepec, Lomas Hipódromo and Lomas Santa Fe, achieving 280 kilometers of coverage. In 1973, it had reached the neighborhoods of Nápoles and Anzures. On August 28, 1974 SCT gave Cablevisión a permanent license to operate, with a subscriber base of 7,000. The company was also given a 12-channel offer devoid of commercial advertising.

In 1982, Cablevisión offered eleven channels, on top of the six extant VHF over-the-air channels (2, 4, 5, 8, 11, 13), with 903 kilometers of coverage. In 1986 it had a total of sixteen channels: the eight over-the-air channels (Televisa's commercial channels 2, 4 and 5, Televisa and UNAM's joint operation on channel 9, the National Polytechnic Institute's channel 11 and Imevisión's three networks, 7, 13 and 22) as well as eight cable channels, among them a relay of CNN, two variety channels in English, a channel airing subtitled movies, a children's channel and a music video channel. The cable coverage had grown to 1,175 kilometers.

Cablevisión removed NBC in 1995 as the network had signed a contract with its competitor TV Azteca.

In 2006, 49% of Cablemás and 50% of TVI (a.k.a. Cablevisión Noreste) were acquired. In 2007, Bestel Company was acquired. On October 31, 2014, the company stopped operating under Cablevisión, rebranding as izzi and launching with Internet, television, and telephone service as a single product.

To strengthen the company, five cable companies were acquired in Mexico:

- Cablemás (100%) in 2011
- Cablecom (48%) in 2012
- Cablecom (remaining 52%) in 2013
- Cablevisión Red a.k.a. Telecable (100%) in 2015.

izzi was listed as the 22nd most valuable brand in Mexico in 2016.

It also operates under the name of "wizzplus" in some cities such as Guerrero, Zacatecas, Monclova, Manzanillo and more. 2021 arrives in Guadalajara.

== Network and services ==
izzi offers services in more than 60 cities in 29 states of Mexico, with a network that covers over 30,000 kilometres (19,000 mi) of optic fiber and 77,000 km (48,000 mi) of coaxial cable. Its offers Internet, television and telephone services for residences and businesses. 20,000-title on-demand television content is available in some areas, and on mobile devices using the izzi go app.

=== Internet ===
40 to 1000 megabits per second of speed.

== Coverage ==
izzi service is available in these Mexican states and cities:

- Aguascalientes
  - Aguascalientes City
- State of Mexico
  - Mexico City
- Baja California
  - Ensenada
  - Mexicali
  - Tijuana
  - Tecate
- Campeche
  - San Francisco de Campeche
- Sonora
  - San Luis Río Colorado
  - Nogales
- Chihuahua
  - Camargo
  - Ciudad Cuauhtémoc
  - Ciudad Juárez
  - Chihuahua
  - Delicias
  - Hidalgo del Parral
  - Meoqui
- Coahuila
  - Saltillo
- Guerrero
  - Acapulco
  - Chilpancingo
- Morelos
  - Cuautla de Morelos
  - Cuernavaca
  - Yautepec de Zaragoza
- Oaxaca
  - Oaxaca City
- Nuevo León
  - Monterrey
- Quintana Roo
  - Cancún
  - Playa del Carmen
- Tamaulipas
  - Ciudad Victoria
  - Reynosa
  - Nuevo Laredo
  - Matamoros
- Veracruz
  - Poza Rica de Hidalgo
  - Tihuatlán
- Yucatán
  - Mérida
  - Progreso
  - Umán
  - Valladolid
  - Tizimín
  - Motul
  - Izamal
  - Temax
  - Chemax
- Zacatecas
- Jalisco
  - Zapopan
  - Puerto Vallarta
  - Guadalajara
  - Tlaquepaque
- Veracruz
  - Coatzacoalcos
  - Minatitlán
  - Cosoleacaque
  - Jáltipan
  - Nanchital
  - Córdoba
  - Orizaba
  - Fortín de las Flores
- Guanajuato
  - Irapuato
