= Dish México =

Mexican telecommunications company

Dish México, S. de R. L. de C.V.
- Formerly: MVS DTH Holdings S. de R.L. de C.V.
- Company type: Private S. de R. L. de C.V.
- Industry: Telecommunication
- Founded: 2008; 18 years ago
- Headquarters: Mexico City, Mexico
- Products: Direct broadcast satellite
- Parent: MVS Comunicaciones (100%)
- Website: www.dish.com.mx

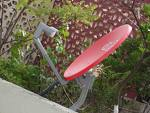
Dish México antenna on a roof.

Dish México is a subscription satellite television service in Mexico. Since 2022, it has been wholly owned by MVS Comunicaciones; prior to then, it was owned jointly by MVS Comunicaciones and EchoStar.

== History ==
On 1 December 2008, Dish México began to operate in Mexico, after an agreement between Dish Network Corporation, a spinoff of EchoStar, and the Mexican media conglomerate MVS Comunicaciones.

In 2011, Dish México had 2.3 million subscribers. Dish México also added six HD channels (TNT; Space; Fox Sports en Español; History Channel; Universal Channel and Sony Entertainment Television) as well as three new channels (Fox; Nat Geo and Nat Geo Wild). All of Dish México's channels programming are dubbed or subtitled in Spanish or originally Spanish language.

Satellite TV service provider Dish announced the integration of Televisa's channels 2, 5 and 9, as well as TV Azteca's 7 and 13, in compliance with the telecommunications reform.

In 2013, Dish México announced that it would add national free-to-air television channels, including Televisa and TV Azteca, due to the telecommunications reform enacted in June 2013, in which all satellite TV companies are forced to transmit television networks whose over-the-air footprint reaches 50% or more of the country. The broadcast of these channels was made official in 2016.

In 2015, Dish Mexico was fined 43 million pesos (US$2.9 million) after its partnership with América Móvil was found to be unauthorized by Mexico's telecommunications regulator; Federal Telecommunications Institute determined that the two companies failed to notify regulators of contracts in advance time.
