= 1924 in music =

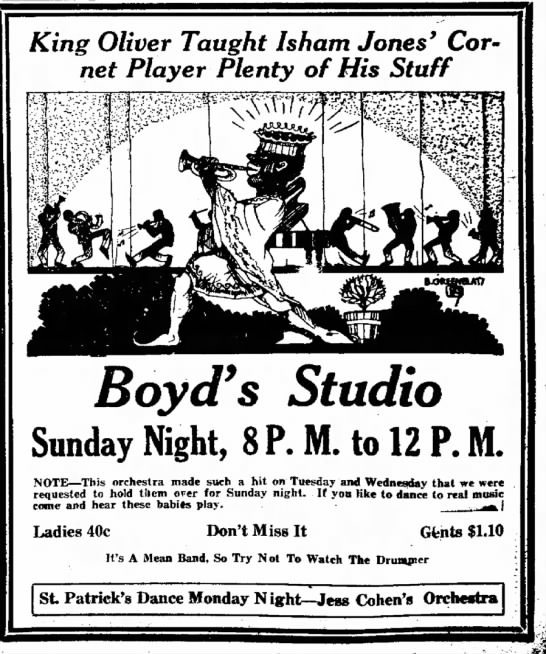
King Oliver at Boyd's Studio Madison Wisc 1924

This is a list of notable events in music that took place in the year 1924.

== Specific locations ==
- 1924 in British music
- 1924 in Norwegian music

== Specific genres ==
- 1924 in country music
- 1924 in jazz

== Events ==
- February 12 – An Experiment In Modern Music concert at Aeolian Hall (Manhattan) – premiere of Gershwin's Rhapsody in Blue.
- February 15 – The inaugural concert of microtonal music in Mexico City by the Grupo Sonido 13, directed by Julián Carrillo, including the premiere of Preludio a Colón and four other of Carrillo's compositions, along with several works by his students, Rafael Adame, Elvira Larios and Soledad Padilla.
- February 18 – First recordings by Bix Beiderbecke.
- March 24 – Jean Sibelius conducts the world premiere of his Symphony No. 7 as Fantasia sinfonica No. 1 in Stockholm. The single-movement work will be the last symphony he completes.
- April – Jimmy Blythe's recording of "Chicago Stomps", sometimes called the first complete boogie-woogie piano solo record.
- May 8 – The revised version of Sergei Prokofiev's Piano concerto No.2 in G minor is performed in Paris with Serge Koussevitzky conducting. Arthur Honegger's Pacific 231 is also premiered at this concert.
- June – Alexander von Zemlinsky's Lyric Symphony is premiered in Prague.
- Summer – American all-girl harmony singing trio Hamilton Sisters and Fordyce formed by Pearl B. Hamilton and departs on a 'Stars of the Future' tour.
- October 17 – Leoš Janáček's String Quartet No. 1, Kreutzer Sonata, is premiered in Prague.
- Richard Terry resigns as organist of Westminster Cathedral.
- First recordings by George Olsen.
- First national anthem of Mongolia introduced.

== Published popular music ==
- "Alabamy Bound" w. Buddy DeSylva & Bud Green m. Ray Henderson
- "All Alone" w.m. Irving Berlin. Introduced by Grace Moore and Oscar Shaw in The Music Box Revue of 1924
- "Amapola" w. Joseph M. Lacalle (Sp) Albert Gamse (Eng) m. Joseph M. Lacalle
- "Bagdad" w. Jack Yellen m. Milton Ager
- "Big Bad Bill (Is Sweet William Now)" w. Jack Yellen m. Milton Ager
- "Big Boy" m. Milton Ager
- "California, Here I Come" w.m. Al Jolson, Buddy DeSylva and Joseph Meyer. Introduced by Al Jolson in the musical Bombo
- "The Call Of The South" w.m. Irving Berlin
- "Charley, My Boy" w.m. Gus Kahn & Ted Fio Rito
- "Copenhagen" w. Walter Melrose m. Charlie Davis
- "Cover Me Up With The Sunshine Of Virginia" w. Sam M. Lewis & Joe Young m. George W. Meyer
- "Deep In My Heart, Dear" w. Dorothy Donnelly m. Sigmund Romberg. Introduced by Howard Marsh and Ilse Marvenga in the operetta The Student Prince in Heidelberg
- "Does The Spearmint Lose Its Flavour On The Bedpost Over Night" w. Billy Rose & Marty Bloom m. Ernest Breuer
- "Doodle Doo Doo" w.m. Art Kassel & Mel Stitzel
- "Drinking Song (Drink! Drink! Drink!)" w. Dorothy Donnelly m. Sigmund Romberg
- "The End Of The Road" w.m. Harry Lauder & William Dillon
- "Everybody Loves My Baby" w.m. Jack Palmer & Spencer Williams
- "Fascinating Rhythm" w. Ira Gershwin m. George Gershwin. Introduced by Cliff Edwards and Fred and Adele Astaire in the musical Lady, Be Good!
- "Follow The Swallow" w. Billy Rose & Mort Dixon m. Ray Henderson
- "Golden Days" w. Dorothy Donnelly m. Sigmund Romberg. Introduced by Greek Evans and Howard Marsh in the operetta The Student Prince in Heidelberg
- "The Half Of It, Dearie, Blues" w. Ira Gershwin m. George Gershwin. Introduced by Fred Astaire and Kathlene Martyn in the musical Lady, Be Good!
- "Hard Hearted Hannah (The Vamp Of Savannah)" w.m. Jack Yellen, Bob Bigelow, & Charles Bates
- "Honest And Truly" w. Leo Wood m. Fred Rose
- "How Come You Do Me Like You Do?" w.m. Gene Austin & Roy Bergere
- "I Want To Be Happy" w. Irving Caesar m. Vincent Youmans. Introduced by Charles Winniger and Louise Groody in the musical No, No, Nanette
- "I Wonder What's Become Of Sally" w. Jack Yellen m. Milton Ager
- "I'll See You In My Dreams" w. Gus Kahn m. Isham Jones
- "I'm A Little Blackbird Looking For A Bluebird" w. Grant Clarke & Roy Turk m. George W. Meyer & Arthur Johnson
- "I'm Coming At Your Call" w. Dorothy Donnelly m. Sigmund Romberg
- "In Shadowland" w. Sam W. Lewis & Joe Young m. Ruth Brooks & Fred E. Ahlert
- "Indian Love Call" (first published as "The Call") w. Otto Harbach & Oscar Hammerstein II m. Rudolf Friml
- "It Had To Be You" w. Gus Kahn m. Isham Jones
- "Jealous" w. Tommy Malie & Dick Finch m. Jack Little
- "June Night" w. Cliff Friend m. Abel Baer
- "Just We Two" w. Dorothy Donnelly m. Sigmund Romberg
- "Keep Smiling At Trouble" w. Al Jolson & Buddy DeSylva m. Lewis E. Gensler
- "King Porter Stomp", Jelly Roll Morton
- "Lazy" w.m. Irving Berlin
- "Let Me Linger Longer In Your Arms" w. Cliff Friend m. Abel Baer
- "Little Jazz Bird" w. Ira Gershwin m. George Gershwin
- "Mama's Gone, Goodbye" w.m. A. J. Piron & Peter Bocage
- "The Man I Love" w. Ira Gershwin m. George Gershwin
- "Mandy Make Up Your Mind" w. Grant Clarke & Roy Turk m. George W. Meyer
- "Memory Lane" w. Buddy DeSylva m. Larry Spier & Con Conrad
- "The Mounties" w. Otto Harbach & Oscar Hammerstein II m. Rudolf Friml
- "My Best Girl" w.m. Walter Donaldson
- "My Dream Girl, I Loved You Long Ago" w. Rida Johnson Young m. Victor Herbert
- "Nobody's Sweetheart" w. Gus Kahn & Ernie Erdman m. Elmer Schoebel & Billy Meyers
- "O, Katharina" w. L. Wolfe Gilbert m. Richard Fall
- "Oh Lady, Be Good" w. Ira Gershwin m. George Gershwin. Introduced by Walter Catlett in the musical Lady, Be Good!
- "Oh! Mabel" Gus Kahn, Ted Fio Rito
- "Oh! Miss Hannah" w. Thekla Hollingsworth m. Jessie L. Deppen
- "The One I Love Belongs To Somebody Else" w. Gus Kahn m. Isham Jones
- "Parisian Pierrot" w.m. Noël Coward
- "Prince Of Wails" m. Elmer Schoebel
- "The Prisoner's Song" w.m. Guy Massey
- "Red Hot Mama" w.m. Gilbert Wells, Bud Cooper & Fred Rose
- "Rhapsody in Blue" m. George Gershwin
- "Riverboat Shuffle" m. Hoagy Carmichael & Irving Mills
- "Rose Marie" w. Otto Harbach & Oscar Hammerstein II m. Rudolf Friml
- "See See Rider" w.m. Ma Rainey
- "Serenade from The Student Prince In Heidelberg" w. Dorothy Donnelly m. Sigmund Romberg
- "Shanghai Shuffle" w.m. Larry Conley & Gene Rodemich
- "Shine" w. Cecil Mack & Lew Brown m. Ford T. Dabney
- "So Am I" w. Ira Gershwin m. George Gershwin
- "Somebody Loves Me" w. Ballard MacDonald & Buddy DeSylva m. George Gershwin
- "Some Other Day, Some Other Girl" w. Gus Kahn m. Isham Jones published October 10, 1924 by Milton Weil Music Co., Chicago.
- "South" m. Bennie Moten & Thamon Hayes
- "Spain" w. Gus Kahn m. Isham Jones published May 5, 1924 by Milton Weil Music Co., Chicago.
- "Stack O'Lee Blues" w.m. by Ray Lopez & Lew Colwell
- "Sweet Little You" w.m. Irving Bibo
- "Tea for Two" w. Irving Caesar m. Vincent Youmans
- "Tell Her In The Springtime" w.m. Irving Berlin
- "There's Life In The Old Girl Yet" w.m. Noël Coward
- "There's Yes! Yes! In Your Eyes" w. Cliff Friend m. Joseph H. Santly
- "Totem Tom-Tom" w. Oscar Hammerstein II & Otto Harbach m. Rudolf Friml
- "Two Little Babes In The Wood" w.m. Cole Porter
- "What'll I Do" w.m. Irving Berlin. Introduced by Grace Moore and John Steel in the Music Box Revue of 1923
- "When My Sugar Walks Down the Street" w.m. Gene Austin, Jimmy McHugh & Irving Mills
- "When You And I Were Seventeen" w. Gus Kahn m. Charles Rosoff
- "Where The Lazy Daisies Grow" w.m. Cliff Friend
- "Why Did I Kiss That Girl?" w. Lew Brown m. Robert A. King & Ray Henderson

== Top Popular Recordings 1924 ==
The following recordings are said to have achieved the greatest success and highest record sales (reported on the Discography of American Historical Recordings website) in America during 1924. Numerical rankings are approximate; they are only used as a frame of reference.

| Rank | Artist | Title | Label | Recorded | Released | Sales information |
|---|---|---|---|---|---|---|
| 1 | Wendell Hall | "It Ain't Gonna Rain No Mo'" | Victor 19171 | October 12, 1923 | November 23, 1923 | 2,000,000 sold |
| 2 | Al Jolson with Isham Jones Orchestra | "California, Here I Come" | Brunswick 2569 | January 17, 1924 | March 14, 1924 | |
| 3 | Fred Waring's Pennsylvanians | "Memory Lane" | Victor 19303 | March 26, 1924 | June 1924 | |
| 4 | Isham Jones Orchestra | "It Had to be You" | Brunswick 2614 | April 24, 1924 | June 1924 | |
| 5 | Paul Whiteman and His Orchestra | "What'll I Do" | Victor 19299 | March 18, 1924 | May 1924 | 538,434 sold (Victor 1920s memo) |
| 6 | Ted Weems and His Orchestra | "Somebody Stole My Gal" | Victor 19212 | November 20, 1923 | January 11, 1924 | 1,000,000 sold |
| 7 | Paul Whiteman and His Orchestra | "Somebody Loves Me" | Victor 19414 | July 11, 1924 | October 1924 | |
| 8 | Fred Waring's Pennsylvanians | "Sleep" | Victor 19172 | October 16, 1923 | November 30, 1923 | |
| 9 | Paul Whiteman and His Orchestra | "Linger Awhile" | Victor 19211 | November 22, 1923 | January 11, 1924 | 1,000,000 sold |
| 10 | Al Jolson | "I Wonder What's Become of Sally?" | Brunswick 2671 | August 6, 1924 | October 1924 | |
| 11 | Isham Jones Orchestra | "Spain" | Brunswick 2600 | April 24, 1924 | June 1924 | |
| 12 | Arthur Gibbs & His Gang | "Charleston" | Victor 19165 | October 10, 1923 | November 23, 1923 | |
| 13 | Al Jolson with Isham Jones Orchestra | "I'm Goin' South" | Brunswick 5021 | June 1, 1924 | September 1924 | |
| 14 | Al Jolson with Isham Jones Orchestra | "The One I Love (Belongs to Somebody Else)" | Brunswick 2567 | January 17, 1924 | March 14, 1924 | |
| 15 | Ted Lewis and His Band | "June Night" | Columbia 157 | May 24, 1924 | August 1924 | |
| 16 | Isham Jones Orchestra | "Some Other Day, Some Other Girl" | Brunswick 2678 | September 15, 1924 | November 1924 | |
| 17 | Fiddlin' John Carson | "Fare You Well, Old Joe Clark" | Okeh 40038 | November 7, 1923 | April 1924 | 1,000,000 sold |
| 18 | Fiddlin' John Carson | "You Will Never Miss Your Mother Until She is Gone" | Okeh 4994 | November 7, 1923 | February 1924 | 1,000,000 sold |
| 19 | Isham Jones Orchestra | "Nobody's Sweetheart" | Brunswick 2578 | February 22, 1924 | May 1924 | |
| 20 | Paul Whiteman and His Orchestra | "Last Night on the Back Porch" | Victor 19139 | September 4, 1924 | October 19, 1924 | 427,784 sold (Victor 1920s memo) |
| 21 | Paul Whiteman and His Concert Orchestra (The Composer at the piano) | "Rhapsody in Blue, Parts 1 & 2" | Victor 55225 | June 10, 1924 | October 1924 | |
| 26 | Marion Harris | "It Had to Be You" | Brunswick 2610 | March 28, 1924 | June 1924 | 427,784 sales |
| 27 | Al Jolson with Abe Lyman's California Orchestra | "Mandalay" | Brunswick 2650 | July 2, 1924 | September 27, 1924 | |

=== Top Christmas hits ===
- "Santa Claus Blues" – Louis Armstrong

== Classical music ==
- Aaron Copland – Symphony for Organ and Orchestra
- George Enescu – Piano Sonata No. 1 in F-sharp minor, Op. 24, No. 1
- Gabriel Fauré – String Quartet in E minor, Op. 121 (his last work)
- George Gershwin – Rhapsody in Blue
- Jacques Ibert – Escales
- Joseph Jongen – Sonata for Flute and Piano
- Ottorino Respighi – Pines of Rome (I Pini di Roma)
- Carl Ruggles – Men and Mountains
- Erik Satie – Relâche (ballet)
- Jean Sibelius – Symphony no. 7 in C major, Opus 105 premieres on March 24 in Stocholm, the composer conducting
- Heitor Villa-Lobos –
  - Chôros No. 2
  - Chôros No. 7
- Arthur Wood – My Native Heath (orchestral suite, including the maypole dance "Barwick Green")

== Opera ==
- Leoš Janáček – The Cunning Little Vixen
- Henri Sauguet – Le plumet du colonel (The Colonel's Helmet)
- Arnold Schoenberg – Die glückliche Hand (first performance)

== Film ==
- Gottfried Huppertz – Die Nibelungen

== Musical theater ==
- Bob et Moi – music by Charles Cuvillier
- Charlot's Revue of 1924 London revue opened at the Prince of Wales Theatre on September 23 and ran for 518 performances
- The Duenna London revival opened at the Lyric Theatre, Hammersmith on October 23 and ran for 141 performances
- Gräfin Mariza (Countess Maritza) – Vienna production opened at the Theater an der Wien on February 28 and ran for 396 performances
- Lady, Be Good! (George and Ira Gershwin) – Broadway production opened at the Liberty Theatre on December 1 and ran for 330 performances
- Leap Year London revue opened at the London Hippodrome on March 20 and ran for 471 performances
- Madame Pompadour Broadway production opened on November 11 at the Martin Beck Theatre and ran for 79 performances
- Midsummer Madness London production opened at the Lyric Theatre, Hammersmith on July 3 and ran for 115 performances
- The Music Box Revue of 1924 Broadway revue opened at the Music Box Theatre on December 1 and ran for 184 performances
- No, No, Nanette (Irving Caesar, Otto Harbach and Vincent Youmans) – Chicago production. Pre-Broadway tryout started in April.
- Our Nell London production opened at the Gaiety Theatre on April 16 and ran for 140 performances
- Patricia London production opened at Her Majesty's Theatre on October 31 and ran for 160 performances
- Poppy London production opened at the Gaiety Theatre on September 4 and ran for 188 performances
- Primrose London production opened at the Winter Garden Theatre on September 11 and ran for 255 performances
- The Punch Bowl London revue opened at the Duke of York's Theatre on May 21
- Puppets London revue opened at the Vaudeville Theatre on January 2 and ran for 254 performances
- Rose-Marie Broadway production opened at the Imperial Theatre on September 2 and ran for 557 performances
- Sitting Pretty Broadway production opened at the Fulton Theatre on April 8 and moved to the Imperial Theatre on June 9 for a total run of 95 performances
- The Street Singer London production opened at the Lyric Theatre on June 27 and ran for 360 performances
- The Student Prince In Heidelberg (Sigmund Romberg) – Broadway production opened at the Jolson's 59th Street Theatre on December 2 and ran for 608 performances
- The Three Graces London production opened at the Empire Theatre on January 26 and ran for 121 performances
- Toni London production opened at the Shaftesbury Theatre on May 12 and ran for 248 performances
- Yoicks! London revue opened at the Kingsway Theatre on June 11 and ran for 271 performances.

== Births ==
- January 1 (nominal date) – Pino Rucher, Italian guitarist (d. 1996)
- January 3 – Nell Rankin, operatic mezzo-soprano (d. 2005)
- January 6 – Earl Scruggs, banjo player (d. 2012)
- January 8 – Ron Moody, star of Oliver! (d. 2015)
- January 10 – Max Roach, jazz drummer (d. 2007)
- January 11
  - Don Cherry, singer (d. 2018)
  - Slim Harpo, blues musician (d. 1970)
- January 16 – Achille Togliani, singer and actor (d. 1995)
- January 20 – Slim Whitman, country musician (d. 2013)
- January 25 – Speedy West, American guitarist and producer (d. 2003)
- January 29 – Luigi Nono, composer (d. 1990)
- February 2
  - Elfi von Dassanowsky, Austrian-born U.S. musician/producer (d. 2007)
  - Sonny Stitt, jazz saxophonist (d. 1982)
- February 19 – André Popp, composer, arranger and screenwriter (d. 2014)
- February 22 – Hassan Aziz Hassan, Egyptian prince and pianist (d. 2000)
- February 26 – Freda Betti, French mezzo-soprano opera singer (d. 1979)
- February 27 – Trevor Duncan, English composer (d. 2005)
- March 3 – Lys Assia, born Rosa Schärer, Swiss singer, first winner of Eurovision Song Contest (1956) (d. 2018)
- March 8 – Alan Dell, BBC radio DJ (d. 1995)
- March 10 – Angela Morley, born Walter "Wally" Stott, light music composer, arranger and conductor (d. 2009)
- March 27 – Sarah Vaughan, jazz singer (d. 1990)
- April 14 – Shorty Rogers, jazz trumpeter (d. 1994)
- April 15 – Sir Neville Marriner, conductor and violinist (d. 2016)
- April 16
  - Henry Mancini, composer (d. 1994)
  - Rudy Pompilli, saxophonist (Bill Haley & His Comets) (d. 1976)
- April 20 – Orlando DiGirolamo, accordionist and pianist (d. 1998)
- April 21 – Clara Ward, gospel singer (d. 1973)
- April 28 – Alakbar Taghiyev, Azerbaijani composer and author (d. 1981)
- April 30 – Sheldon Harnick, lyricist (d. 2023)
- May 1
  - Big Maybelle, R&B singer (d. 1972)
  - Gamal Abdel-Rahim, Egyptian composer (d. 1988)
- May 3 – Mimi Aarden, Dutch operatic mezzo-soprano (d. 2013)
- May 4 – Tatiana Nikolayeva, pianist, composer and teacher (d. 1993)
- May 10 – Teddy Riley, jazz trumpeter (d. 1992)
- May 19 – Sandy Wilson, composer of The Boyfriend (d. 2014)
- May 22
  - Charles Aznavour, French singer and songwriter (d. 2018)
  - Claude Ballif, French composer (d. 2004)
- May 25 – Marshall Allen
- May 31 – Ida Presti, French classical guitarist (d. 1967)
- June 5 – John Tooley, English opera director and manager (d. 2020)
- June 5 – Serge Nigg, composer (d. 2008)
- June 20 – Chet Atkins, guitarist (d. 2001)
- June 21 – Wally Fawkes, jazz clarinettist and cartoonist (d. 2023)
- June 29
  - Ezra Laderman, American composer (d. 2015)
  - Flo Sandon's, Italian singer (d. 2006)
- July 5 – János Starker, cellist (d. 2013)
- July 9 – Pierre Cochereau, organist, improviser, composer (d. 1984)
- July 13 – Carlo Bergonzi, operatic tenor (d. 2014)
- July 19 – Al Haig, jazz pianist (d. 1982)
- July 20 – Mort Garson, Canadian-American songwriter and composer (d. 2008)
- July 22 – Margaret Whiting, singer (d. 2011)
- July 28 – Irving Burgie (aka Lord Burgess), composer (d. 2019)
- August 3 – Connie Converse, folk singer-songwriter (disappeared 1974)
- August 6 – Ella Jenkins, children's folk singer-songwriter (d. 2024)
- August 14
  - Lee Adams, lyricist
  - Georges Prêtre, French conductor (d. 2017)
- August 20 – Jim Reeves, country singer (d. 1964)
- August 28 – Berislav Klobučar, Croatian opera conductor (d. 2014)
- August 29 – Dinah Washington, singer (d. 1963)
- September 7 – Hugh Aitken, American composer (d. 2012)
- September 12 – Ella Mae Morse, singer (d. 1999)
- September 19 – Ernest Tomlinson, light music composer (d. 2015)
- September 20 – Jackie Paris, jazz singer (d. 2004)
- September 27 – Bud Powell, jazz pianist and composer (d. 1966)
- September 28 – Rudolf Barshai, conductor and violist (d. 2010)
- October 1 (probable) – Roger Williams, pianist (d. 2011)
- October 3 – Joe Allison, songwriter and country music executive (d. 2002)
- October 10 – Buddy MacMaster, American fiddler (d. 2014)
- October 12 – Erich Gruenberg, Austrian-British violinist (d. 2020)
- November 14 – Leonid Kogan, violinist (d. 1982)
- November 16 – Michèle Auclair, violinist and teacher (d. 2005)
- November 25 – Paul Desmond, jazz saxophonist (d. 1977)
- November 30
  - Klaus Huber, composer (d. 2017)
  - Allan Sherman, musical parodist (d. 1973)
- December 7 – Bent Fabric, Danish composer and pianist (d. 2020)
- December 24
  - Lee Dorsey, singer (d. 1986)
  - Mohammed Rafi, Indian playback singer (d. 1980)
- December 25 – Noël Lee, classical pianist and composer (d. 2013)

== Deaths ==
- January 2 – Sabine Baring-Gould, hymn-writer and collector of folk songs (b. 1834)
- January 4 – Alfred Grünfeld, pianist and composer (b. 1852)
- February – Ada Adini, operatic soprano (b. 1855)
- February 10 – Charles Collette, composer and actor (b. 1842)
- February 15 – Lionel Monckton, English composer (b. 1861)
- February 17 – Oskar Merikanto, pianist, conductor and composer (b. 1868)
- February 23 – Antonio Pasculli, oboist and composer (b. 1842)
- February 25 – Mária Royová, songwriter (b. 1858)
- March 18 – Frederick Bridge, organist and composer (b. 1844)
- March 27 – Sir Walter Parratt, English composer, Master of the King's Musick (born 1841)
- March 29 – Charles Villiers Stanford, composer (b. 1852)
- April 1 – Melville Collins, composer, pianist, and baritone (b. 1878)
- April 5 – Rosalind Ellicott, composer (b. 1857)
- April 15 – Eduard Caudella, violinist and composer (b. 1841)
- April 26 – Josef Labor, pianist, organist and composer (b. 1842)
- May 13 – Louis Hirsch, composer and songwriter (b. 1887)
- May 26 – Victor Herbert, composer (b. 1859)
- June 11 – Théodore Dubois, composer (b. 1837)
- June 17 – Victor-Charles Mahillon, musician and collector of instruments (b. 1841)
- June 23 – Cecil Sharp, folk song and dance revivalist (b. 1859)
- July 6 – Black Benny, bass drummer (b. c. 1890)
- July 27 – Ferruccio Busoni, pianist and composer (b. 1866; kidney disease)
- August 18 – Laura Lemon, composer (b. 1866)
- August 23 – Heinrich Berté, Austrian operetta composer (b. 1858)
- August 29 – Francis Barraud, designer of HMV logo (b. 1856)
- September 25 – Lotta Crabtree, all-round entertainer (b. 1847)
- September 29 – Eduardo Arolas, tango musician and composer (b. 1892)
- November 4 – Gabriel Fauré, French composer (b. 1845)
- November 21 – Paul Milliet, opera librettist (b. 1848)
- November 26 – Rose Hersee, operatic soprano (b. 1845)
- November 29 – Giacomo Puccini, composer (b. 1858)
- December 5 – W. H. Neidlinger, organist and composer (b. 1863)
- December 8 – Xaver Scharwenka, pianist and composer (b. 1850)
- December 21 – Leopold Winkler, pianist and composer (b. 1860)
- date unknown
  - Elkan Naumburg, businessman, musicologist and patron of the arts (b. 1835)
  - Mark Walker, songwriter (b. 1846)
