= 1924 in British music =

This is a summary of 1924 in music in the United Kingdom.

== Events ==
- 13 May – Edward Elgar is appointed Master of the King's Musick in succession to Sir Walter Parratt.
- date unknown
  - Richard Runciman Terry resigns as organist of Westminster Cathedral because of criticism of his choice of music, "erratic behaviour" and "neglect of duty".
  - The London Labour Choral Union is launched by Rutland Boughton.

== Popular music ==
- "The Bristol Pageant", w. Frederic Weatherly, m. Hubert Hunt
- "There's Life In The Old Girl Yet" w.m. Noël Coward
- "Will You Forgive?", m. Albert Ketèlbey

== Classical music: new works ==
- Gustav Holst – Choral Symphony (premiered in 1925)
- William Walton – Bucolic Comedies (lost), with words by Edith Sitwell
- Arthur Wood – My Native Heath (orchestral suite, including the maypole dance "Barwick Green", now famous as the theme to The Archers)

== Opera ==
- Ralph Vaughan Williams – Hugh the Drover, with libretto by Harold Child

== Musical theatre ==
- Primrose, written for the London stage by Guy Bolton and George Grossmith Jr., with lyrics by Desmond Carter and Ira Gershwin, and music by George Gershwin.
- Puppets, revue with music by Ivor Novello and others, starring Binnie Hale and Stanley Lupino

== Births ==
- 8 January – Ron Moody, actor, singer and composer (died 2015)
- 21 January – Benny Hill, comedian, actor and singer (died 1992)
- 9 February – George Guest, organist and choirmaster of St John's College, Cambridge (died 2002)
- 27 February – Trevor Duncan, composer (died 2005)
- 8 March – Alan Dell, BBC radio DJ (died 1995)
- 15 April – Sir Neville Marriner, conductor and violinist (died 2016)
- 18 April – Buxton Orr, composer (died 1997)
- 6 May – Denny Wright, jazz guitarist (died 1992)
- 19 May – Sandy Wilson, composer of The Boyfriend (died 2014)
- 20 May – Syd Dale, composer and arranger of big band, easy listening and library music (died 1994)
- 1 June – John Tooley, opera director and manager (died 2020)
- 16 July – Johnny Brandon, singer-songwriter (died 2017)
- 19 September – Ernest Tomlinson, light music composer (died 2015)

== Deaths ==
- 2 January – Sabine Baring-Gould, hymn-writer and collector of folk songs, 89
- 15 February – Lionel Monckton, composer, 62
- 18 March – Frederick Bridge, organist and composer, 79
- 27 March – Sir Walter Parratt, composer, Master of the King's Musick, 83
- 29 March – Sir Charles Villiers Stanford, composer, 71
- 5 April – Rosalind Ellicott, composer, 66
- 23 June – Cecil Sharp, folk song and dance revivalist, 64
- 6 August – John Roberts (Pencerdd Gwynedd), organist and composer, 76
- 26 November – Rose Hersee, operatic soprano, 78

== See also ==
- 1924 in the United Kingdom
- List of British films of 1924
