= Hugh Aitken =

Hugh Aitken may refer to:

- Hugh Aitken (composer) (1924–2012), American composer
- Hugh Aitken (curler), Scottish curler
- Hugh G. J. Aitken (1922–1994), American scholar, recipient of the Leonardo da Vinci Medal
