= Peggy Ann Wood =

British actress, director and theatre manager

- Born: 14 June 1912; Chiswick, London, England
- Died: 30 May 1998 (aged 85); Northwood, London, England
- Spouse: Ronald Russell

Peggy Ann Wood (14 June 1912 – 30 May 1998) was a British actress, director and theatre manager associated heavily with the Bristol Old Vic. In partnership with her husband, Ronald Russell (1910–1994), she ran the repertory company the Rapier Players, based in Bristol's Colston Hall. During the Second World War, Peggy Ann Wood ran the theatre whilst Ronnie served in the Police War Reserves, and once the Prince's Theatre had been bombed in November 1940, the Rapier Players provided the only live theatre in the city of Bristol. The contribution of Ronnie Russell and Peggy Ann Wood to the theatrical heritage of Bristol was commemorated with a Blue Plaque Ceremony in July 2002, which is situated on the outside of Colston Hall, Bristol.

== Personal life and death ==
Wood was born in 1912, in Chiswick, daughter of the composer and conductor Arthur Wood. She studied at St Paul's School. In 1931, while performing in repertory at Rochester, she met her future husband Russell. They married in 1937 and remained together for 57 years, until his death in 1994. Wood died four years later at age 85.

== Partial filmography ==
- All Creatures Great and Small as Mrs Beck (1980)
- Strangers and Brothers as Mrs. Doris Seymour (1984)
- The Assam Garden as Mrs Grace (1985)
- After Henry as Vera Poling (1988-1992)
