= Ambridge Extra =

- Ambridge Extra logo used on the BBC website
- Genre: Soap opera
- Running time: 15 minutes
- Country of origin: United Kingdom
- Language: English
- Home station: BBC Radio 4 Extra
- Produced by: Julie Beckett; Sara Conkey; Rosie Boulton
- Edited by: Vanessa Whitburn; Sean O'Connor (from mid-September 2013)
- Recording studio: BBC Birmingham
- Original release: 5 April 2011 – 5 September 2013
- No. of series: 5
- No. of episodes: 112
- Audio format: Stereophonic sound
- Opening theme: "Barwick Green" arranged by Bellowhead
- Website: Official website

Ambridge Extra is an extension of the long-running radio drama The Archers. It began broadcasting sporadically on the digital radio station BBC Radio 4 Extra from 5 April 2011. The programme ran for five series, before it was "rested".

== Overview ==
Ambridge Extra ran in addition to The Archers and gave an insight into other areas of the characters' lives. Writer Tim Stimpson explained the show "should be a little extra gift to our regular Archers listeners, crafted with affection and giving them a new perspective on life in Ambridge." He stated that the team wanted the series to be accessible for people who had never listened to The Archers before. Ambridge Extra featured a number of new or previously silent and minor characters from the main series and initially focussed on several of the younger characters. The programme was broadcast on Tuesday and Thursday with an omnibus on Sunday, all following The Archers on Radio 4. The Archers theme tune "Barwick Green" was re-arranged for Ambridge Extra, and was performed by folk group Bellowhead.

The first series of Ambridge Extra ran for 13 weeks (26 episodes) from April through to June 2011. A second 13-week series began airing from 4 October 2011 at 2.15pm on Tuesdays and Thursdays. It was produced by Sara Conkey and Rosie Boulton. Ambridge Extra was recommissioned for a third series, which began airing from 3 July 2012. A fourth series was broadcast from 4 December 2012. When the fifth series of Ambridge Extra began on 2 July 2013, there was much criticism over key scenes appearing in the show rather than The Archers.

On 30 January 2014, it was confirmed that Ambridge Extra would not be returning for a sixth series and was going to be "rested". Anita Singh from The Daily Telegraph reported that the show was "highly unlikely" to return. The commissioning editor for Radio 4 Extra stated "Our Ambridge Extra decision won't impact on The Archers in any way, but across the BBC we are having to make tough financial choices and prioritise and protect the services and content that deliver the most value to audiences."

== Reception ==
Listener response to the early episodes were largely negative. Vicki Power from The Daily Telegraph suggested that the series showed potential, but needed to include storylines that the main show could "not afford to ignore", suggesting that the current format felt like listening to "the reserve team". The show was nicknamed AMEX by listeners. It was also dubbed "Archers Lite". The show attracted an average audience of 250,000 listeners per week, compared with the main show's five million.
