= Wilfrid Sanderson =

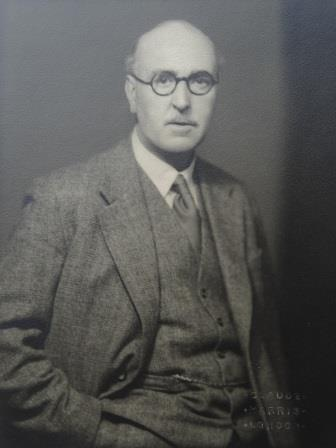
Wilfrid Sanderson

Wilfrid Ernest Sanderson FRCO LRAM (23 December 1878 – 10 December 1935) was a composer and organist based in Doncaster.

== Life ==
Sanderson was born in Ipswich. His father was Revd. Thomas Sanderson, a Wesleyan Methodist minister, born in Warrington in 1848. Wilfrid was one of eight children. His mother was Emily, born in Liverpool in 1848. Wilfrid was educated at St. Dunstan's College, and the City of London School.

He studied organ under Frederick Bridge as pupil and later assistant organist at Westminster Abbey from 1895 - 1904. During this time, Wilfrid was present in the organ loft during Queen Victoria's funeral and memorial service held on 2 February 1901. He also sang tenor in the Westminster Abbey choir for the coronation of King Edward VII and Queen Alexandra on 26 June 1902.

His musical studies gained him the Mus.Bac (Dunelm), FRCO and LRAM. His early appointments were: church organist at St Stephen's, Walthamstow (1895 at the age of seventeen); organist at All Hallows', Southwark (1897); organist at St James's, West Hampstead (1899-1904). In 1904 he married Mary Elizabeth Petch and moved to Doncaster where he became organist of Doncaster Parish Church until 1923. He was also conductor of the Doncaster Musical Society (1911-1924) and of the Doncaster Amateur Operatic Society (1909-1924).

During the Great War he served as a senior clerk with the Ministry of Works. He moved his family south to Egham, and after the war moved to Nutfield in Surrey. He became an examiner for Trinity College of Music in 1924 and until his death.

He died in Nutfield, Surrey in 1935 from typhoid, the result of eating contaminated oysters. He left a son Wilfrid Guy Sanderson (who was later to become Anglican Bishop of Plymouth) and a daughter Elizabeth.

== Appointments ==
- Organist at St. Stephen's Church, Walthamstow 1896 - 1898
- Organist at All Hallows' Church, Southwark 1898 - 1899
- Organist at St. James' Church, West Hampstead 1899 - 1904
- Organist at St. George's Church, Doncaster 1904 - 1923

== Compositions ==
He wrote around 170 songs, and also some pieces for piano and organ. His many ballads became well known throughout the British Isles. He worked with a number of lyricists including Frederic Weatherly KC, Helen Taylor, Edward Teschemacher, P.J. O'Reilly, Lancelot Cayley Shadwell and P. H. B. Lyon. His songs were often performed at the popular Saturday afternoon concerts at the Royal Albert Hall, presented by Arthur Boosey & Co. They were also performed at the Promenade Concerts, organised by Sir Henry Wood. Sheet music sales of his most successful song, "Until" (1910) sold more than a million copies. It is said that his song "Drake Goes West" (1910) was the first song ever to be broadcast on wireless radio by the BBC.

- My Dear Soul (1906)
- Until (1910)
- Drake Goes West (1910)
- Friend O'Mine (1912), text by Frederic Weatherly KC
- You Along O' Me (1912), text by P. J. O'Reilly
- Up From Somerset (1912), text by Frederic Weatherly KC
- Shipmates O'Mine (1913)
- Hills of Donegal (1914)
- The Song of the 29th Division (1918), text by Lancelot Cayley Shadwell
- Company Sergeant Major (1918), text by PHB Lyon
- Devonshire Cream and Cider (1919)
