= Howard Marsh =

American singer

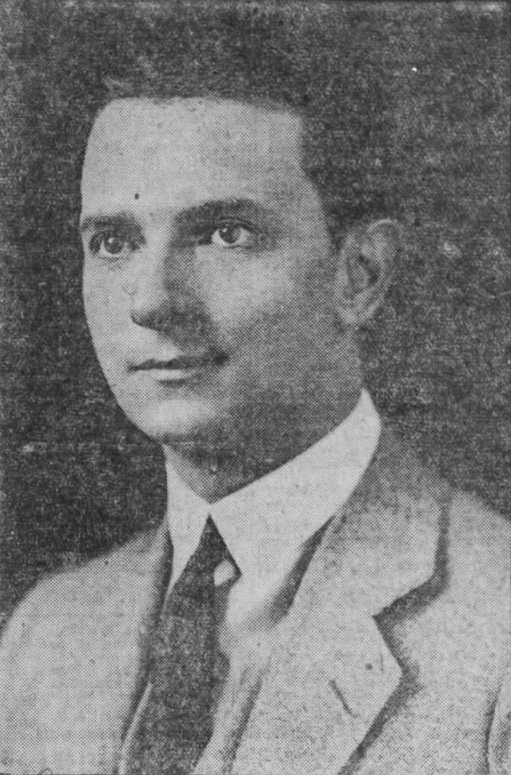
- Born: Howard Warren Marsh; August 16, 1888; Bluffton, Indiana
- Died: August 7, 1969 (aged 80); Long Branch, New Jersey
- Occupation: Singer

Howard Warren Marsh (August 16, 1888 – August 7, 1969) was a leading Broadway tenor of the 1920s.

== Biography ==
Howard Marsh was born in Bluffton, Indiana on August 16, 1888. He attended Purdue University, where he was a member of the fraternity Phi Gamma Delta.

He created the role of Baron Franz Schober (not Franz Schubert) in Sigmund Romberg's operetta drawn from Schubert's life and music, Blossom Time, in 1921, and that of Prince Karl Franz in the original 1924 production of Sigmund Romberg's operetta The Student Prince. Marsh also played Gaylord Ravenal in the original 1927 Broadway production of Jerome Kern and Oscar Hammerstein II's Show Boat. He played Ravenal only in the original production of Show Boat, not in any of the revivals, and never appeared in films or on television. Despite appearing in three musical theatre smash hits over a span of seven years, Marsh made his last appearance in a new show in 1930, The Well of Romance, opposite his Show Boat co-star, Norma Terris. After that, he appeared in major roles on Broadway in 1930's revivals of some Gilbert and Sullivan operettas. He made no recordings of the songs that he sang either in The Student Prince or Show Boat, but he did record some of those Gilbert and Sullivan selections. None of his recordings has appeared on CD as yet.

He died at Monmouth Medical Center in Long Branch, New Jersey on August 7, 1969.
