= Champagner-Polka =

1858 polka by Johann Strauss II

Champagner-Polka, Op. 211, subtitled "A musical joke", is a polka by Johann Strauss II, written in 1858 for his successful tour of Russia where he performed in the summer concert season at Pavlovsk, Saint Petersburg, where it was played for the first time on 12 August 1858.

Strauss dedicated the Champagne-Palk to Karl Ludwig von Bruck (1798–1860), the Austrian Minister of Finance from 1855 to 1860.

The polka itself references the chorus of a popular tavern song by Hungarian composer János Fusz (Johann Fuß), "Mir is’ alles ans" (What do I care).
