= Laura Lemon =

Canadian composer (1866–1924)

- Born: 15 October 1866; Guelph, Canada West
- Died: 18 August 1924 (aged 57); Surrey, England
- Other names: Austin Fleming, Ian Macdonald
- Occupation(s): Author, composer

Laura Gertrude Lemon (15 October 1866 – 18 August 1924) was a Canadian composer and songwriter who lived and worked in England. She also used the pseudonyms Austin Fleming and Ian Macdonald. Lemon was mostly known for composing pieces for violin and piano such as "Three Moravian Dances", which was dedicated to the Canadian violinist Kathleen Parlow. However she also noted for her songs. "My Ain Folk, a ballad of home", was at one time one of the best-known songs by a Canadian composer.

== Early life ==
Lemon was born in Guelph, Ontario. Her father was Andrew Lemon, Queen's Counsel, with a job as a partner in the law firm Lemon and Peterson. Her mother was Laura Armstrong, after whom she was named. In 1881, when she was five years old, the family moved from their Arthur Street home to Winnipeg, Manitoba. Lemon grew up there with an appreciation and skill for music. In her early 20s Lemon moved to England, enrolling in the Royal Academy of Music in London.

== Musical career ==
Lemon was a skilled pianist and many of her early works were written for piano. In the 1890s, her compositions began to be published as on sheet music. These titles included "Slumber Songs" and "Three Moravian Dances". Her works were performed by local singers, sometimes with Lemon's accompaniment.

Lemon began to collaborate with lyricist Wilfrid Mills in 1904. Their work "My Ain Folk" (1904) (subtitled "A Ballad of Home") remains the best recalled of their collaborations. The prominent English singer, Dame Clara Ellen Butt, popularized the song by performing it during one of her presentations. The first recording that can be traced was sung by Dame Clara for the Gramophone Company Limited in July 1912. Others who later recorded it are John McDermott, John Allan Cameron, Lulu and Kenneth McKellar.

Lemon died in Surrey, England, in 1924.

== Works ==
Lemon composed for violin and piano, but was best known for her songs. The selected works include:

- Three Moravian Dances, for piano and violin (1910) – dedicated to Kathleen Parlow
- "My Ain Folk: A Ballad of Home" (1904). Arranged by Reg Leopold
- Slumber Songs (1895)
- "My Ain Love and My Dearie" (1900)
- "Canada Ever!" (1907)
- "Mighty Dominion" (1910)
- Canadian Song Cycle (1911), words by Wilfred Mills
- "Love's Necklet" (1913), words by Lancelot Cayley Shadwell (1882–1963)
