= Lancelot Cayley Shadwell =

English lyricist

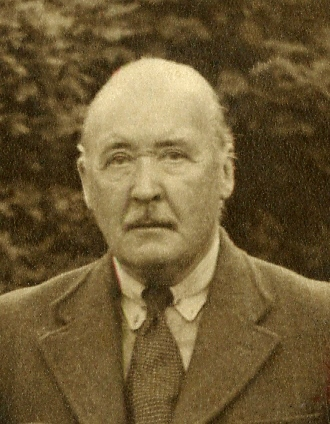
- Born: 26 April 1882; Maida Vale, London, England
- Died: 28 October 1963 (aged 81); Lyndhurst, England
- Occupations: Author, lyricist, and ceramicist
- Spouse(s): Dorothy C. Mockett (1878–1949), Mary Longbottom (1891–1969)
- Children: Lorna Dorothy Cayley Shadwell (1907–1991), Lancelot Rodney Cayley Shadwell (1912–1943)

Signature
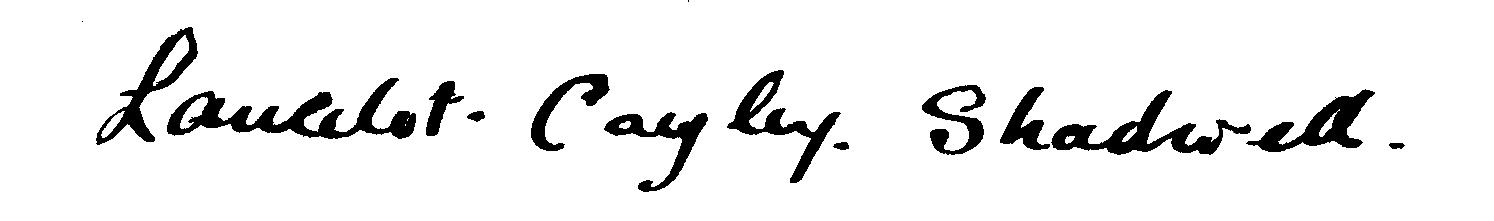

Lancelot Cayley Shadwell (26 April 1882 – 28 October 1963) was an English writer, lyricist, and ceramicist. He wrote the lyrics to a host of many songs, published three collections of his poetry, and contributed to the popular monthly series Books for the Bairns, published by W.T Stead to provide affordable literature to children and adults. During World War I, he helped launch and nurture one of the most successful concert parties of the war: the Diamond Troupe of the 29th Division. In the mid-1920s, Shadwell co-founded the Broadstone Potters—a small but influential producer of studio pottery with links to some of the most influential figures in British ceramics.

== Early life ==
Shadwell was born in Maida Vale, London in 1882, the son of Captain Thomas Henry John Shadwell (1859–1893) and Mary Feare James (1859–1892). He was born into a family of distinguished legal scholars, amongst whom was the renowned Sir Lancelot Shadwell (1779–1850), barrister, Member of Parliament, and ultimately Vice-Chancellor of England.

The young Shadwell spent his early years in Ramsgate, Kent. Orphaned at age nine, he inherited the family estate of nearly £11,500—equivalent in today's money to more than £1.2M. He was sent to live with his maternal grandparents in Frome, Somerset, England, where his grandfather, Sydney James (1831–1907) was a successful veterinarian.

By the age of 23, Shadwell had returned to Kent, this time to Faversham where, in 1905, he married Dorothy C. Mockett (1878–1949), the eldest daughter of Sherwood Mockett (1850–1922), a wealthy Margate businessman and grain merchant. From that marriage were born two children, first a daughter, Lorna Dorothy Cayley (1907–1991) and then a son, Lancelot Rodney Cayley (1912–1943).

== Writings ==
From early on, Lancelot was drawn to the arts—and to the literary arts, in particular. His interest may have sprung from his adolescence in Frome, where he grew up not far from the town's Scientific and Literary Institute (today's Frome Museum). By the outbreak of the First World War, Shadwell, then in his early 30s, could already point to a number of publishing successes. In 1909, he wrote a short, children's story entitled Curly's Trip to Toyland and his Visit to the Clockmen, which was issued as part of the popular monthly series, Books for the Bairns, and was illustrated by Irish artist Brinsley Le Fanu and A. G. Addision. Clearly inspired by Alice's Adventures in Wonderland, the story follows the adventures of a young boy, Curly, who is led by a wise old owl into a subterranean world inhabited by the toys he knows from a local shop window. In the second half of the story, Curly visits a fantasy world of bearded elves and paper cut-out people, which he enters through the narrow door of his family's old grandfather clock.

Two years later, in 1911, Shadwell applied his skills to music, writing the lyrics to Dreamland by British composer Harold Garstin (1875–1935) and then again, in 1914, to the same composer's Love in a Garden. In between, he wrote the words to Love's Necklet, composed by the Canadian Laura Gertrude Lemon (1866–1924).

On the eve of the First World War, Shadwell wrote a series of poems for The Navy, the monthly magazine of the Navy League of Great Britain. The League was amongst a number of groups agitating for greater military preparedness in the face of an increasingly armed Germany. With titles such as Hymn of Empire and Heroes of the South Pole, Shadwell's poems drove home the League's call for action by juxtaposing notions of duty and patriotism with the imagery of heroes past. Following Britain's declaration of war in August 1914, Shadwell compiled these and other poems into an anthology entitled Sea Weed. Amongst the poems is one dedicated to his then two-year-old son, Rodney:

To a Young Briton (L.R.C.S.)

Baby boy, I am thinking, thinking
Of all the days that yet shall be,
Of the thread of time that our lives are linking
Across the years 'twixt me and thee.
What will you be when Time shall call
And over its road, as those before,
You take your way? I am thinking, thinking,
What have the waiting years in store?

Boy, will the blood of your Viking sires,
Pulsing through your eager heart,
Kindle the flame of wars' desires
And nerve you well to play your part?
What of the ocean calling fierce
Over the bones of our Island race,
You'll heed to the voice that never tires
And manfully take your rightful place?

Boy, you're bred from a stock that's given
Of all its best to the angry sea;
Boy, your sires have ever striven
And fought with her for victory,
Their voices call from hidden depths;
"We bled and died for England's sake,
The Empire that we piled is given
To you who own to the blood of Drake."

Boy, be this your endless striving
When shall come your battle day,
And the winds of Fate are driving
Your young soul upon its way:
Think of the blood, and toil, and sorrow,
That mark the triumph of England’s race,
And swear to God that, dying, living,
You will stand in your rightful place!

== World War I and the Diamond Troupe ==
In August 1915, Shadwell joined the Army Service Corps, one of several support regiments within the renowned 29th Division. Whilst not himself involved in the Division's historic landing at Gallipoli, it was in the Dardanelles where he met Major John Graham Gillam (1884–1965), author of the Gallipoli Diary (1918). According to Gillam, it was Shadwell who convinced him to publish his diary, eventually adding several passages of his own.

By 1916, the 29th Division had moved on to the Western Front where it would remain for the duration of the war. There, Shadwell and Gillam again partnered to establish what would eventually become one of the most successful entertainment troupes or "concert parties" of the war: the Diamond Troupe. Together with Gilliam, Shadwell supervised the voice trials and selection of troupe members. He also contributed to the troupe's subsequent repertoire by supplying what Division chronicler S. Gillion described as "... the light, topical, frivolous comic matter, so dear to the average Briton". Typical of this genre were two songs, In these Hard Times and 365 Days. Shadwell also scripted the Harlequin and Columbine scene, which Gillon described as "... probably the most finished production of the troupe". Though Shadwell never served as the Troupe's commanding officer, he remained actively involved in its work, supervising rehearsals, assuming command on occasions, and eventually writing the lyrics to accompany the Division's anthem, Song of the 29th Division, by composer and organist Wilfred Sanderson (1878–1935).

After the war, Shadwell returned to England where, from his new home in Bournemouth, he oversaw supply operations at the Dundalk military barracks in what was then the "Irish Theatre of War". He was demobilized from military service on 21 April 1921.

== Bournemouth and the Broadstone Potters ==
At some point after moving to Bournemouth, Shadwell met Mary Longbottom (1891–1969), the eldest daughter of William Henry Lister Longbottom (1867–1918), a wealthy Yorkshire wool merchant. Mary, or "Molly" as she was known to friends, was a self-taught painter and water-colourist who had lived in Bournemouth with her family since at least the first decade of the century.

In 1926, Shadwell and Longbottom established a small pottery studio in Bournemouth. Thanks to Longbottom's innovative designs and the growing appeal of studio ceramics, and generally, the business quickly grew. By 1928, the two bought land and constructed facilities in nearby Broadstone. However, the 1929 crash of the American stock market and the ensuing global depression saw declines in the demand for goods generally. Though production levels at the Broadstone Potters continued to grow into the following decade, by 1933 the studio's workforce, which had once numbered 15, had shrunk to just three: Shadwell, Longbottom and a young Harry Clemens Davis (1910–1986) who would later come to be known as one of the most celebrated and influential ceramic artists of the 20th century.

Though short-lived, the Broadstone Potters did leave its mark on the world of studio ceramics. Their patterns, the most famous of which were marketed as Joyous, Canford and Tavern, were highly acclaimed at the time and sought after in "respectable" social circles. In 1928, newspapers were already describing the Joyous line as having made "... a name for itself. Its gorgeous coloring and charm of line is too well known to need any pointing out, and the one kiln is kept working at high pressure". Even today, Joyous pottery remains highly wanted, fetching high prices when it appears on the market.

By 1933, the business was on its last legs, and Davis, along with Shadwell and Longbottom, had moved to the newly established artists' colony of St Ives in Cornwall. There, Shadwell worked with and lived on the compound of Bernard Howell Leach (1887–1979), widely regarded as the father of British studio pottery. The fallout of the Broadstone Potters' demise, however, was never far behind; nor were the domestic tensions resulting from Shadwell's relationship with Longbottom. That year, his wife, Dorothy, filed for divorce. The Broadstone Potters closed its doors for good on Christmas Day, 1933, and seven months later, Shadwell and Longbottom were married in a small civil ceremony in Southampton. Some years later, he celebrated their kindred spirits by dedicating to "M.S." a booklet of his poems entitled The Little People. In it, he writes that “Not all may see the fairy folk at play / nor hear the patter of their tiny feet... / But you have seen them many times before / And heard their pipes ere revelries begin / So when my verses knock upon your door / I am sure that you will let them in!”

== Later life ==
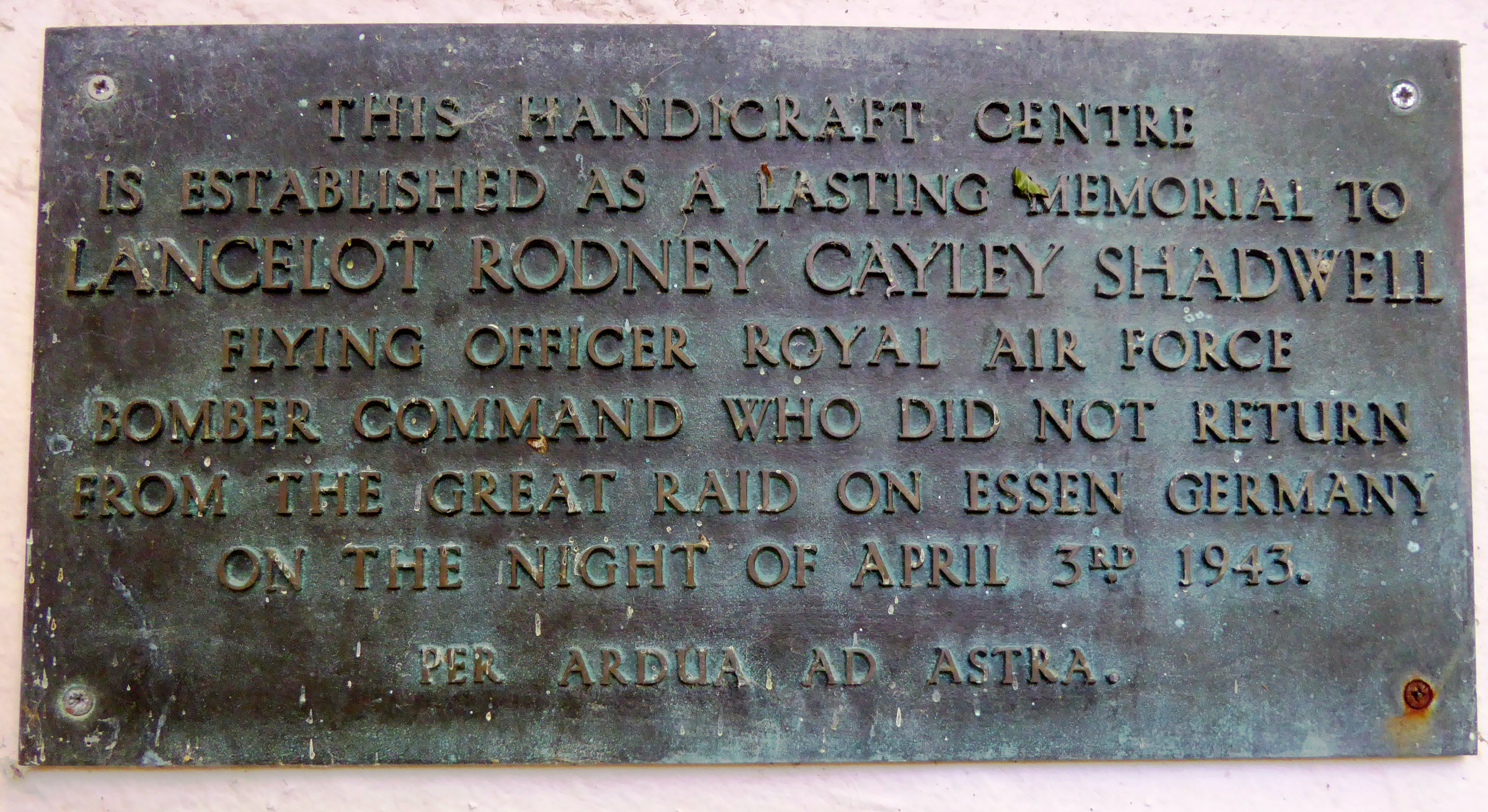
Bronze plaque dedicated to the memory of RAF Flying Officer Lancelot Rodney Cayley Shadwell (1912–1943). Former Handicraft Centre, Kingston Deverill.

In 1937, Shadwell and his new wife retired to Kingston Deverill in Wiltshire where they built a modest home, Barley Close, that was overlooking the ancient ford over the River Wylye.

It was during his time in Kingston Deverill that Shadwell published his last known work, Rifts in the Storm, a moving and very personal response to the death of his son, RAF Flying Officer Lancelot Rodney Cayley Shadwell, who was shot down over the Netherlands in 1943. Rifts in the Storm is a short anthology of his poems, some of which had been previously published in the Daily Telegraph, Morning Post and Montreal Star. It is a highly personal work, dedicated, in Shadwell's words: "To those Chosen Ones—the gallant souls of the RAF who held the skies for England against enormous odds, and then-spreading their wings anew, soared away to other and brighter skies beyond our ken."

Rodney's death also inspired Shadwell to convert Kingston Deverill's former Methodist Chapel into a community workshop for producing crafts for charity. He named it the Memorial Handicraft Centre and installed a bronze plaque recording the date and circumstances of his son's death. In 1957, the centre was sold to the local postmaster who made it his home and gave it the name by which its location is still known today: Rodney Cottages.

That same year, Lancelot and Mary moved to Lyndhurst in the New Forest. He died seven years later at the age of 81. Mary died in 1969, aged 77, six months after opening her own one-woman exhibition of paintings at Southampton's Hamwic Gallery.
