= Arthur Wood (composer) =

English composer and conductor

- Born: Arthur Henry Wood; 24 January 1875; Heckmondwike, Yorkshire, UKGBI
- Died: 18 January 1953 (aged 77); Chiswick, Middlesex, UK
- Occupations: Composer; conductor
- Notable work: "Barwick Green", 1924
- Spouse: Ethel Louise Wood (m. 1898)
- Children: 5 including, Peggy Ann Wood

Arthur Henry Wood (24 January 1875 – 18 January 1953) was an English composer and conductor. Wood is known for his 1924 work "Barwick Green", the signature theme for the BBC Radio 4 series The Archers.

== Early life and education ==
Wood was born on 24 January 1875 in Heckmondwike, Yorkshire to George Henry Wood (1850–1923), and Henrietta Jackson Wood (née Hepworth; 1853–1925). Wood's father was a tailor and violinist who played in a local amateur orchestra. Wood initially learnt to play the violin, before later learning to play the flute and piccolo which became his primary instruments.

In 1882, aged 7, Wood's family moved to Harrogate where he began receiving flute learns from Arthur Brookes, a member of the Spa Orchestra and later member of the Boston Symphony Orchestra. Wood left school aged 12.

== Musical career ==
In 1889, aged 14, Wood became the organist at St Paul's Presbyterian Church in Harrogate. By age sixteen Wood had become the lead flautist, pianist and deputy conductor of the Harrogate Municipal Orchestra. Later he moved onto the Bournemouth Municipal Orchestra.

In 1903, at the age of twenty-eight, he progressed to become the director of music at Terry's Theatre, London. Wood conducted London theatre orchestras for over three decades, including the Apollo Theatre, the Shaftesbury Theatre, His Majesty's Theatre and the Theatre Royal, Drury Lane.

== Works ==
Wood was a prolific composer of works in a variety of categories, although he was self-taught in composition and orchestration. His first published work, the orchestral work Three Old Dances, was first published in 1902.

After this he became a staff composer for Boosey & Hawkes, for whom he wrote many orchestral suites and single works, many related to his upbringing. These include Three Dale Dances, the Yorkshire Moors Suite, A Lancashire Clog Dance and My Native Heath, from which his most famous piece "Barwick Green" came. Other orchestral works include his Concertino in A major, Widow Malone, An Oriental Scene and Fairy Dreams.

He also composed for a number of stage musicals, such as Yvonne, Petticoat Fair, and Fancy Fair, the latter two dating from about 1918.

Apart from "Barwick Green", his works are now rarely performed.

== Personal life ==
In 1898, Wood married Ethel Louise Wood (née Bean; 1874– 1953). The couple had five children (Note: Also cited as three.) including Peggy Ann Wood, an actress, director and theatre manager.

Wood moved to live in London in 1903, and in 1907 moved into 20, Arlington Gardens in Chiswick, Middlesex (present-day London). He was a member of two gentlemen's clubs: the Green Room Club and the Savage Club.

Wood died at this address on 18 January 1953. In 2012 Wood's grand-daughter led an unsuccessful campaign to have a blue plaque erected on the building, which has been converted into flats.
