= Hugh Aitken (composer) =

American composer (1924–2012)

Hugh Aitken (September 7, 1924 – December 24, 2012) was a 20th-century American composer.

== Biography ==
Aitken was born in New York City to Hugh Aitken Sr. and Florence Aitken. He grew up in the Bronx and attended Evander Child High School.

There were artists of all kinds in his family; his father was a musician, playing the violin and also composing, his mother danced in vaudeville in her youth, one cousin was a radio, stage, and television actress (Joan Swenson) and another danced in the Balanchine company.

He studied chemistry for two years at New York University, but quit to join the Army. He served as a navigator in the Air Force in the Second World War, realized during the War that composing was his true vocation, so he used the GI Bill to enroll at Juilliard from 1946-50.

He studied composition under Bernard Wagenaar, Vincent Persichetti, and Robert Ward, receiving a MS degree in 1950.

He married Laura Tapia (1924-2017) in 1946.

Aitken taught at Juilliard from 1960 until 1970, and was then appointed Professor of Music at William Paterson College in New Jersey.

He died at home in Oakland, New Jersey on Dec. 24, 2012. He is survived by children Peter Gil Aitken and Alexandra Elizabeth Aitken.

He received commissions from the National Endowment for the Humanities, the Elizabeth Sprague Coolidge Foundation, the Naumburg Foundation, the Juilliard School, the Concord String Quartet, Yoyo Ma/Emmanuel Ax, and the dancer José Limón.

== Major works ==
=== Stage works ===
- Fables, an opera based on La Fontaine's Fables, (1975).
- Felipe, an opera based on Al Túmulo del Rey Felipe en Sevilla by Miguel de Cervantes (1981) (Review, New York Times)
- Dance scores, (1949–63)

=== Choral works ===
- Mass settings, (1950, 1964)
- The Revelation of St. John the Divine (1953–90)

== Instrumental works ==
- Piano Concerto, (1953)
- violin concertos, (1984, 1988, 1992):
  - Aspen Concerto, recorded by Naxos Digital Services Ltd., [2005] with Elmar Oliveira, violinist, and the SeattleSymphony Orchestra. AR-0004-2
- Symphony, (1998)
- multiple chamber works.

== Books ==
- Aitken, Hugh. The Piece As a Whole: Studies in Holistic Musical Analysis. Westport, Conn: Greenwood Press, 1997 ISBN 9780313029745
