= Barwick Green =

Theme music to the BBC Radio 4 soap opera The Archers

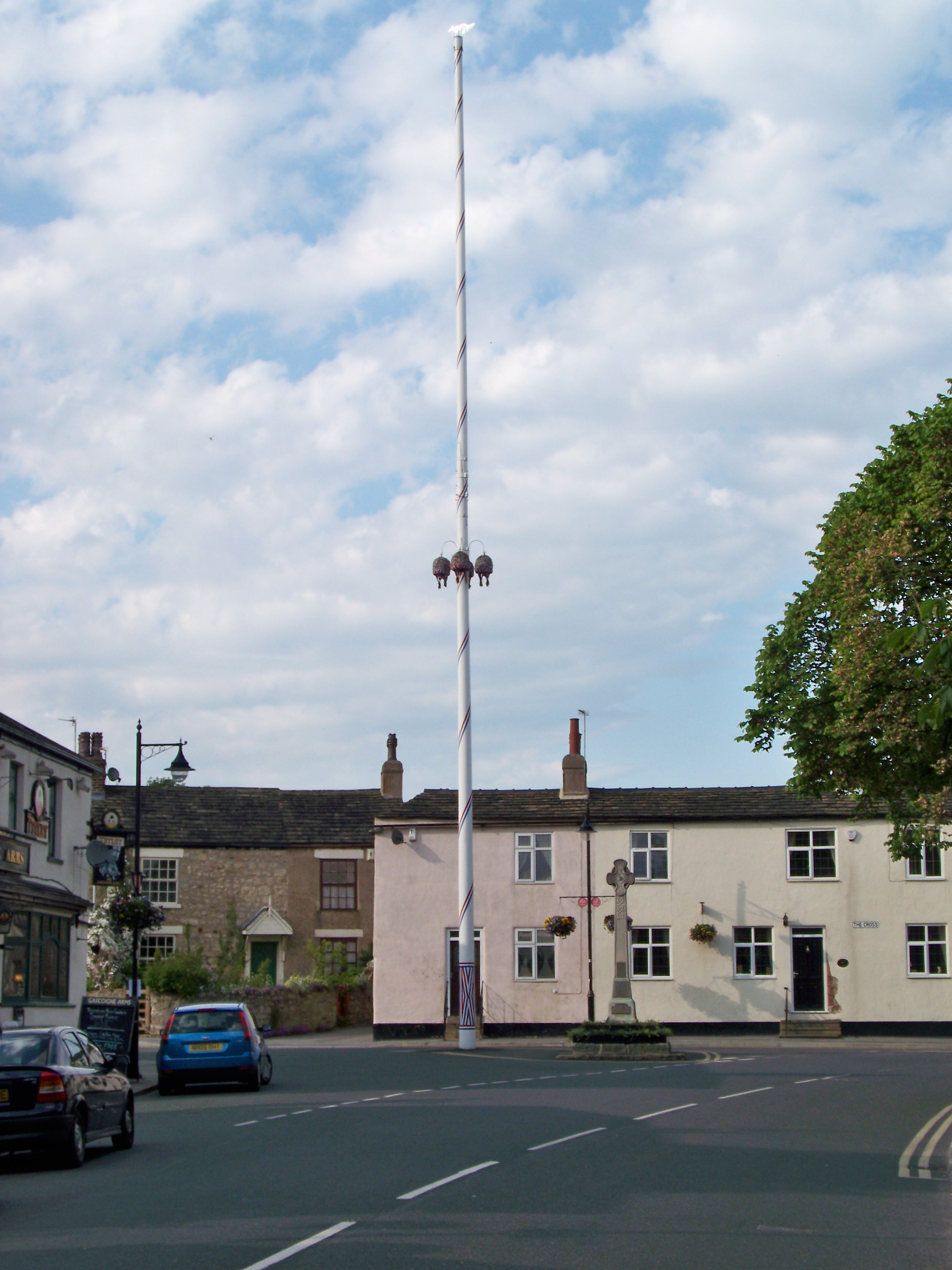
Barwick Maypole

"Barwick Green" /ˈbærɪk/ is the theme music to the long-running BBC Radio 4 soap opera The Archers. A "maypole dance" from the suite My Native Heath written in 1924 by the Yorkshire composer Arthur Wood, it is named after Barwick-in-Elmet in Yorkshire's West Riding.

Barwick Green
A piece of Barwick Green as used in The Archers

The recording used between 1950 and the 1990s was played by Sidney Torch and his orchestra. It was produced by George Martin. Sidney Torch recorded a commercial version of "Barwick Green" in the 1950s, but it was not used on The Archers itself.

The familiar opening seven notes are echoed in the pizzicato in Benjamin Britten's Simple Symphony, written in 1934.

The Sunday omnibus broadcast of The Archers starts with a more rustic, accordion-arranged rendition by The Yetties, while BBC Radio 4 Extra's former spinoff, Ambridge Extra, used a version arranged by Bellowhead.
