= Rosalind Ellicott =

English composer (1857–1924)

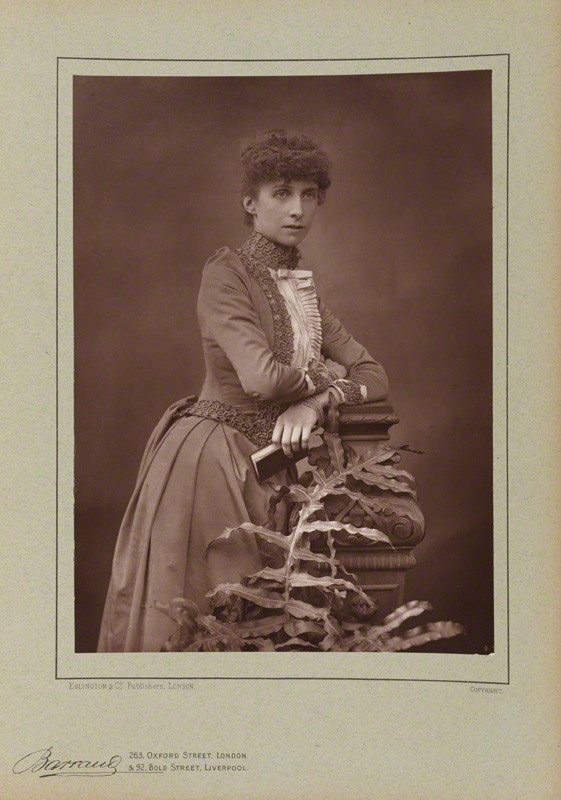
An 1890 portrait of Ellicott, by Herbert Rose Barraud

Rosalind Frances Ellicott (November 14, 1857 – April 5, 1924) was an English composer, considered one of the leading female composers of her generation.

== Life ==
Ellicott was born on November 14, 1857, in Cambridge, the daughter of Constantia Annie Ellicott (née Becher) and Charles Ellicott, the Bishop of Gloucester and Bristol. Her father had no interest in music and it was predominantly her mother, an amateur singer who had been involved with the founding both of London's Handel Society (1882–1939) and of the Gloucester Philharmonic Society, who encouraged young Rosalind's talent. At age six "she exhibited an extraordinary facility in music, singing, and harmonising correctly by ear". She took lessons from Samuel Sebastian Wesley, the cathedral organist, from age 12, tried writing songs at 13 and then a sonata at 16.

From 1874 to 1876, she studied piano with Frederick Westlake at the Royal Academy of Music. While at the Academy she discovered her voice and took soprano solo parts in oratorios and cantatas and was a frequent soloist at the Three Choirs Festival. She also studied composition for seven years from 1885 under Thomas Wingham of the Brompton Oratory. She was a member of the International Society of Musicians and the National Society of Professional Musicians, as well as an ARAM. But despite her relative success in the last two decades of the century as a composer and performer, by the early 1900s she began disappearing from the public eye. She moved to the south coast after World War I and died in Seasalter, on April 5, 1924. (Note: Sources differ on this; some state that she died in London, not in Seasalter, although the year given is the same.) She is buried near her parents in the churchyard of Birchington-on-Sea, in Kent.

== Music ==
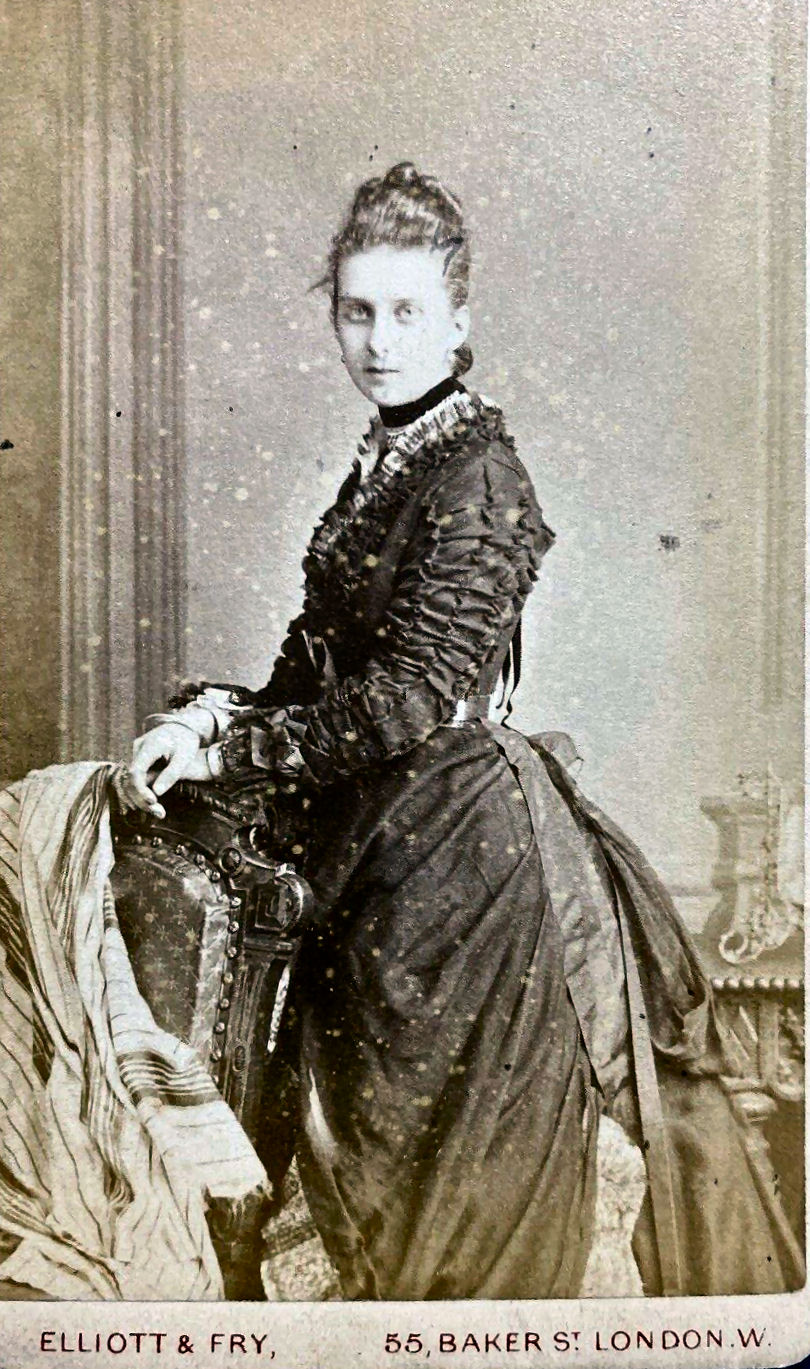
Rosalind Ellicott by Elliott & Fry (c1870)

In 1886, Ellicott found success at the Gloucester Festival with the orchestral Dramatic Overture and then in 1889 with Elysium, a lyrical cantata. Of her Elysium: "the orchestration is full and vigorous, the brass specially bold and refreshing, and there is not a dull bar .... It is a charming and spirited work [and received] repeated calls". Both of these early works were performed subsequently at concerts in Bristol, Cheltenham, Oxford, London, Dresden and Chicago. It has been suggested that her father's position as a bishop enabled her to have some of her works performed at the Three Choirs Festival (held in rotation in Gloucester, Hereford and Worcester.) However, the majority of new composers used patronage from established musicians or other influential people in order to obtain festival premieres.

Her ambitious works for chorus and orchestra were cast in a traditional, broadly Romantic vein. But towards the end of the century she began to turn her attention to chamber music, possibly hoping that there would be more opportunities for it to be performed. The Piano Trio No 1 in G received its first performance in Bristol at the end of 1889, with the composer as pianist. The second trio was given at the Gloucester Guildhall on 29 October 1903. The Piano Quartet in B minor and the Violin Sonata were both introduced at the same Steinway Hall concert in London on 28 April 1900, performed by Sybil Palliser, Edie Reynolds, Lionel Tertis and Charles Ould. Her songs and chamber works were regularly performed at the festivals and were generally well-received. She composed rapidly: "I get a whole movement in my head before I touch paper. I hardly ever alter my compositions."

Little of Ellicott's work has survived to this day apart from some songs and instrumental works, although both piano trios have been issued in modern recordings.

== Works ==
Orchestral

- Concert Overture (1886)
- Dramatic Overture (1886)
- Festival Overture (1893)
- Fantasia for piano and orchestra (1895)
- Overture To Spring

Chamber

- A Sketch for violin with piano accompaniment (1883)
- String Quartet in Bb (1884)
- String Quartet in F
- A Reverie for Violoncello & Pianoforte (1888)
- Piano Trio No 1 in G (1889)
- Piano Trio No 2 in D minor (1891)
- Six Pieces for Violin and Pianoforte (1891)
- Piano Quartet in B minor (1900)
- Sonata in D for violin and piano (1900)
- Sonata for cello and piano

Choral

- Elysium cantata (1889)
- The Birth of Song: a cantata for soli, chorus and orchestra (1892)
- King Henry of Navarre: a choral ballad (men's voices) with orchestral accompaniment ad. lib. (1894)
- To the Immortals

Part songs

- "Sing to me". Duet for Soprano & Tenor; words by R. S. Hichens (1887)
- "Radiant Sister of the Day". A Four-part Song; words by Shelley (1887)
- "Peace be around thee". Four-part Song; words written by T. Moore (1888)
- "Bring the bright Garlands". Part-Song; words by Moore (1889)

Solo songs

- "The sweet blue eyes of springtime". (Die blauen Frühlingsaugen.) Song; poem by H. Heine. English translation by C. Rowe (1881)
- "From my sad tears are springing". (Aus meinen Thränen.) Song; poem by H. Heine. English translation by C. Rowe (1881)
- "To the Immortals". Song; words by D. F. Blomfield (1883)
- "Verlust": solo song; words by Heine, English Translation by J. Troutbeck. [In C minor and D minor.] (1884)
- "I love thee". Song; words by R. S. Hichens (1887)
- "A Dream of the Sea". Song; words by R. S. Hichens (1889)

== Discography ==
- Piano Trio No 1 in G major (circa 1889), recorded by the Trio Anima Mundi on English Piano Trios, Divine Art DDA2515
- Piano Trio No 2 in D minor (1891), recorded by the Summerhayes Piano Trio. (English Romantic Trios: Meridian Records, 2005. CDE84478)
- Reverie, recorded by Joseph Spooner (cello) and Michael Jones (piano) at Potton Hall, Suffolk, 21–23 May 2008. (Romantics in England – Music for Cello & Piano: Dutton, 2009. CDLX7225)
