= List of The Archers characters =

BBC Radio 4 soap characters

This is a list of characters from the long-running British radio soap The Archers.

== The Archer family tree ==
Archer family tree (Brookfield Farm)

(1) Grace | Phil | (2) Jill
(1) Mark Hebden | Shula Hebden Lloyd | (2) Alistair Lloyd | Kenton | Jolene | David | Ruth | Nigel Pargetter | Elizabeth Pargetter
Daniel Hebden Lloyd | Meriel | Pip | Lily
Josh | Freddie
Ben

Archer family tree (Bridge Farm)

(1) Jack | Peggy | (2) Jack Woolley
Jennifer Aldridge | Brian Aldridge | Lilian Bellamy | Tony | Pat
Adam Macy | Kate | John
Johnny "Rich"
Debbie | Alice | Helen
Henry
John "Jack"
Tom | Natasha

== The Archer family ==
Jill Archer née Patterson (born 3 October 1930) (Patricia Greene) is the widow of Phil Archer and matriarch of the family. She was his second wife, and with him had four children: twins Shula and Kenton, and David and Elizabeth. She is busily involved in village life and supports her children by taking on child-minding duties. Jill is an active member of the Women's Institute, opened up a holiday cottage business, and is teaching her grandson, Josh, how to keep bees. Jill has a less traditional outlook on life than her late husband, who had been a Justice of the Peace, reflected in her opposition to both foxhunting and private education. Following a burglary at Glebe Cottage she was asked by David and Ruth to return to Brookfield which subsequently became permanent. In 2019, she surprised her family by announcing that she had met a new man – Leonard Berry, a widower whom she met while visiting the Laurels. Since then, Jill and Leonard have enjoyed a cosy companionship, complicated slightly when Leonard thought Jill wanted them to get married – when she made it clear that she had no desire to have another husband, they happily resumed their relationship.

Christine Barford née Archer, formerly Johnson (born 21 December 1931) (Lesley Saweard, formerly played by Pamela Mant and briefly Joyce Gibbs), is the younger sister of Phil. A skilled horsewoman, she ran the local riding stables for many years. In the early 1950s she was a close friend of Grace Fairbrother who later married her brother Phil. Christine married Paul Johnson; it was discovered she was infertile, and they adopted a son, Peter. In the mid-1970s Paul deserted the family and he was later killed in a motorway crash in Germany. In 1979 Christine married George Barford, a gamekeeper, which was seen as a class transgression, even though her uncle, Tom Forrest was also a gamekeeper, and colleague of her future husband. Her marriage to George lasted over 25 years and was happy, but latterly they experienced difficult times as their house burned down due to an arson attack by Clive Horrobin. George died peacefully whilst they were waiting for the house to be re-built. Christine lived with Peggy Woolley for some years but in 2018 suffered a fall and went into The Laurels initially for respite but is intending to take up a place in an assisted living flat. She lost her capital in a fraud perpetuated by associates of Matt Crawford. Since 2019, Christine has become a silent character.

Lilian Bellamy, née Archer (born 8 July 1947) (Sunny Ormonde, formerly played by Elizabeth Marlowe) is the twice-widowed, gin-soaked, chain-smoking second daughter of Peggy Archer (and step-daughter of Jack Woolley). After acquiring her second husband Ralph Bellamy in 1971, she left Ambridge to live with him in tax exile in the Channel Islands; she has by him a grown-up son James, who lives in London with Robert Snell's daughter Leonie and their son Mungo. Bellamy senior died in 1980, but Lilian unaccountably returned to Ambridge in 2003 and took up with Matt Crawford (then a married man); her exploits caused much gnashing of teeth from her respectable sister Jennifer Aldridge. Lilian was elected to the parish council in January 2006. Lilian took dancing lessons from Mike Tucker after she discovered that Crawford's ex-wife was a much better dancer than she. In 2008 she and Crawford were briefly separated, and Lilian was an unwelcome guest at The Bull, but with the connivance of Sid and Jolene they were reunited. Crawford has since served a prison term for fraud. Their relationship was further tested when his long-lost brother Paul Morgan sought out, befriended, and ultimately fell in love with Lilian. After Matt's release the couple grew closer and ran property investment start-up Amside Holdings together – until Matt deserted her to live with another woman in Costa Rica. Since then she has formed a relationship with Justin Elliott, a wealthy businessman.

Tony Archer (b. Anthony William Daniel Archer, dob. 16 February 1951) (played by Colin Skipp & David Troughton) is the step-son of Jack Woolley being the youngest child and only son of Jack and Peggy Archer. In his younger days he romanced a string of girlfriends. In 1972 Jane Petrie, an attractive young art teacher from the fictional Borchester, was running the summer school at Arkwright Hall. The distraction would get Tony the sack from Ralph Bellamy's dairy enterprise. In 1974 he settled down to marry Pat, with whom he now runs a fully organic establishment at Bridge Farm. Despite owning an MG sports car, bought with a windfall from his mother, he is generally considered to be a rather dull man. His brother-in-law Brian Aldridge enjoys winding him up over farming matters, and dinner parties involving the two couples usually ended in tears. Pat and Tony had three children, John, Helen and Tom. John was killed in a tractor accident. Helen had a baby boy, Henry Ian Archer, through AI, a decision of which Tony initially disapproved. Tom runs a sausage business and makes pork ready meals under the Tom Archer brand. Tony suffered a heart attack in late February 2012, and a serious farmyard accident in autumn 2014. Having recovered from both, he now takes more of a back seat in the family business.

Pat Archer née Lewis (born Patricia Lewis, 10 January 1952) (Patricia Gallimore) Tony's wife since 1974 is of Welsh descent. Much taken with studying feminism in the mid-1980s, she came close to having an affair with her lecturer, Roger, just before Bridge Farm entered the process of becoming organic. Affected by severe depression at the time of John's death, she discovered at the end of 2011 that he had fathered a child. Filled with remorse, Pat had strongly disapproved of Sharon, John's girlfriend, and this discovery turned into an obsession which caused problems for her family. She also had problems with her daughter Helen's new boyfriend Rob in 2014, especially given the affair and the breakdown of a marriage within which they were brought together. Although she came to accept him after Helen made a drastic move and left her family home and moved in with Rob in February, she had questioned whether Rob had played a part in Helen quitting her long-running job at the Ambridge Organics store. Her deceased son John's teenage son Johnny took up residence at Bridge Farm when he came to the village but when Helen and her children returned both Tom and Johnny moved to Number 1, The Green owned by Will Grundy.

(See also Former principal characters.)

Alistair Lloyd (born 1962) (Michael Lumsden), Shula's ex-husband, is a vet. His father Professor Jim Lloyd (John Rowe) stayed with them at Christmas and New Year 2007–8 while his broken leg healed. A committed atheist he riled Shula and antagonised his son, but indulged Daniel and contrived to get along with everyone else, except for Phil who saw through him. Alistair mentored Ryan at Gamblers Anonymous. Jim later relocated, bought his own property in Ambridge and went into a business partnership with Kenton which was dissolved when Kenton moved to the Bull. Currently Alistair is living in Jim's house, where Jazzer McCreary was also co-resident until he moved in with Tracy. In 2019 Alistair's sister Fiona Lloyd (Adjoa Andoh) visited Ambridge to celebrate her father Jim's birthday.

Kenton Archer (born Kenton Edward Archer, 8 August 1958) (Richard Attlee, formerly played by Graeme Kirk) is portrayed as the wastrel of the Archer family. Having turned his back on the family farm to join the Merchant Navy, Kenton tried his hand at a number of ventures, including selling antiques and running a wine bar. He disappeared to Australia and New Zealand for several years and was married (originally to gain a visa, though they subsequently fell in love), had a daughter (Meriel), and divorced before returning home. Kenton's former partner, Kathy Perks, is the ex-wife of Sid Perks, the late landlord of The Bull. His current wife is Sid's widow, Jolene, whom he married in autumn 2013 at Lower Loxley. Together they run The Bull.

Jolene Archer, formerly Perks, previously Tuson, originally Rogers (Buffy Davis), widow of Sid Perks, whose third wife she was, and landlady of the Bull. When younger she was a stalwart of the Borsetshire Country and Western scene (under the name The Lily of Layton Cross), and object of Eddie Grundy's affections, much to Clarrie's distress. Following Sid's untimely death she formed a relationship with Kenton Archer, and they were married in 2013.

David Archer (born David Thomas Archer, 18 September 1959) (Timothy Bentinck, formerly played by Nigel Carrivick) is the second son of Phil and Jill and, as the only child of the four to show any interest in, or aptitude for, farming, has assumed responsibility for Brookfield Farm. As he has aged he has become increasingly caring, for example driving up to Northumberland to bring his widowed mother-in-law to stay, and renting a piece of land to Joe Grundy to allow him to keep the barn he had erected without planning permission. Brookfield has suffered from bovine TB, but David is enthusiastic about his herd of Herefords. His cowman's heavy-handed advice (which he and Ruth reluctantly accepted) that they should dispense with the services of Shula's husband as vet for their dairy herd in favour of a specialist caused a serious family rift, and was followed by his near-affair with Sophie Barlow. Recently, he bought an old tractor, dubbed "Rufus", which he has restored.

Ruth Archer, née Pritchard (born 16 June 1968) (Felicity Finch) is the wife of David Archer. Unusually the character comes from a real rather than fictional place, Prudhoe in Northumberland. She came to Ambridge as a Harper Adams student looking for agricultural work experience in 1987, and promptly met David, who was keen to settle down: the couple married within two years. They have three children: Philippa (Pip), Josh and Ben. Ruth survived breast cancer which struck in 2000, undergoing a mastectomy operation. Ruth's utterance "Oh noooooo", spoken in her Northumberland accent, was frequently parodied on the BBC Radio 4 comedy programme Dead Ringers. In an unpopular and heavily criticised plotline Ruth teetered on the brink of an affair with farm employee Sam Batton in the autumn of 2006. Many listeners considered Ruth's behaviour during this storyline to be entirely out of character, and therefore unbelievable. Others thought her immature self-centred vacillation was entirely in character, and that it was the largely off-air rehabilitation of the marriage and the family's 'blind eye' that was unbelievable. She has since undergone breast reconstruction surgery, and coped rather better than David with the sudden transformation of priggish daughter Pip into a very stroppy seventeen-year-old with a much older boyfriend, Jude, who eventually dropped her. More recently, Ruth has suffered a miscarriage and championed a potential move from Brookfield to Prudhoe should "Route B" be constructed, breaking the farm in two. Although David went along with this at first, he had doubts and confessed he could never leave Ambridge.

Elizabeth Pargetter, née Archer (born Elizabeth Ann Archer, 21 April 1967) (Alison Dowling). The youngest child of Phil and Jill Archer, Elizabeth is the widowed lady of Lower Loxley. Following her marriage to Nigel Pargetter, she took to her role enthusiastically and her quick mind and sound business sense ensured that the Hall ran like a well-oiled machine. Her practical side was the perfect grounding for her eccentric and slightly scatty husband, who died in a fall from the roof on 2 January 2011. As the family rallied round, devastated Elizabeth drew her precious twins close to her. After David admitted to her that it had been he who had persuaded her husband to go onto the roof in the first place, Elizabeth exploded in a violent rage and swore she would never forgive him. After 18 months Elizabeth realised the feud had gone on for too long, and family relations returned to normal.

Helen Titchener, née Archer (born 16 April 1979) (Louiza Patikas, formerly played by Frances Graham and Bonnie Engstrom), Tony and Pat Archer's daughter, makes a cheese called Borsetshire Blue in the farm dairy and runs the organic farm shop, Ambridge Organics, in Borchester. After the suicide of her gamekeeper partner Greg Turner in 2004, she suffered from anorexia nervosa, but recovered after a time at a specialist clinic. In 2006 she dated a journalist who quickly rejected her; this subsequently threatened a return to her earlier problems. On New Year's Day 2007, while driving drunk, she knocked down Mike Tucker but Tom, a passenger in the car, took the blame. The shock of this event made her re-evaluate her life and she has since helped develop a new type of cheese with Oliver Sterling, named Sterling Gold. After another failed relationship she decided that she wanted a child more than she wanted a partner and became pregnant by artificial insemination – a decision which caused friction within the family, particularly alienating Tony. Father and daughter were reconciled, however, after the birth of her son Henry Ian Archer, who was delivered by emergency caesarean section the day after New Year's Day 2011, Helen having been diagnosed by the vicar's midwife daughter with pre-eclampsia. In 2013 she was attracted to the recently arrived dairy-unit manager, Rob Titchener. Intimacy ensued, although Rob was still married to Jess, who remained in Hampshire caring for her sick father. Helen and Henry moved in with Rob in early 2014, and Helen and Rob married in summer 2015. During 2015, the increasing indications that Rob was coercively controlling and emotionally abusing Helen became a major plot line. In April 2016, after meeting Jess in secret, Helen stabbed Rob after he refused to let her and Henry leave (placing a knife in her hands, goading her to end her own life, then lashing out at Henry when the child interrupted the confrontation). Subsequently, she was arrested and charged with attempted murder. In an hour-long special broadcast on Sunday 11 September 2016, she was ultimately acquitted after the jury decided that she had acted in self-defence.

Tom Archer (born Thomas Archer, 25 February 1981) (William Troughton; previously Tom Graham) is the younger son of Tony and Pat. He took over his elder brother's pig herd after John was killed in a tractor accident, going on to produce organic sausages. Tom and his then girlfriend, Kirsty Miller, faced criminal charges in 1999 for the destruction of a field of genetically modified crops on Brian Aldridge's land, but neither was convicted. Tom is highly ambitious for his sausage-making business, but his contract with a supermarket chain nearly bankrupted him, despite his disastrous affair with their buyer, Tamsin. Tom was engaged to Brenda Tucker between May 2009 and April 2013.

Tom decided to throw in his lot with Brian Aldridge, husband of his aunt Jennifer, becoming a junior partner in the business. In the process, the sausage business lost its organic status, which created further tension between the families. In February 2006 he started dating Brenda Tucker, having provided support to her when her mother died suddenly two months earlier. Later the same year, Tom expanded his business and set up a new independent business, Gourmet Grills, essentially a burger van albeit specialising in high-quality meat products. When Helen ran over Mike Tucker, Tom took the blame and, unaware that it had been Helen driving, Mike turned against him, opposing his relationship with Brenda. Mike subsequently discovered the truth, Helen paid for the driving course that Tom was sentenced to attend, and Tom and Brenda moved into one of the holiday cottages at Home Farm. After Will Grundy bought No. 1 The Green, Tom and Brenda rented the house from Will. After a brief split from Brenda, they got back together and became engaged on 29 May 2009. In April 2013 Brenda decided to end the engagement and the couple separated. Tom later got back together with Kirsty, with whom he got engaged at Christmas 2013, the ring being in the last Christmas cracker, but after a crisis of confidence, Tom broke up with Kirsty in the vestry moments before their planned wedding. Subsequently, Tom sold his business and moved to Canada. He returned to Ambridge as soon as he heard about his father's accident.

After his sister Helen's trial and acquittal, Tom and Kirsty got back together for one evening and she later discovered that she was pregnant. While preparing for the birth of the child Tom gained a Nuffield Scholarship, which he hoped would enable him to set up an organic baby -food business. Kirsty miscarried and Tom lost all enthusiasm for baby food, returning from his travels instead with a passion for fermented food, something not widely shared in the family nor the village. While on the Nuffield Scheme, Tom fell for a previous Nuffield Scholar and then mentor, Natasha. After a long period of pining, Tom discovered that she was similarly attracted and they married after a whirlwind romance. They lived for a while in the flat above the village shop before moving back in with Tony and Pat. After learning that Natasha was expecting twins, they moved into April Cottage. Twin daughters Nova and Seren were born in July 2022.

Pip Archer (born Philippa Rose Archer, 17 February 1993) (Daisy Badger; previously Helen Monks) was christened Philippa in homage to David's father and Rose after Ruth's aunt: the eldest Brookfield child is known in the family as Pip, and at college as Phiz. She inherited some of grandfather Phil's interest in music, learning to play the piano and singing solos at carol concerts. Pip has a clear interest in farming and also caring for the environment. Pip split from her first boyfriend, Jonathan, a boy she met at her YFC (Young Farmers Club), and began an affair with a much older man, a mature student at Borchester College called Jude Simpson. Her parents did not approve. Jude eventually left the country without her after leading Pip to believe that they were going on a round-the-world backpacking trip together. After a work placement in Yorkshire, she became more focused on her future and the future of the farm. She finished her degree in the summer of 2015 and accepted a post with an international agri-business with which she could gain experience of farming around the world. But during the initial orientation, she changed her mind and decided to return home to Ambridge and work with her parents at Brookfield. She became involved with Toby Fairbrother, a son of Robin Fairbrother (who had briefly romanced Elizabeth many years ago). As a result, Pip became pregnant, leading to the birth of Rosie Ruth Grace Archer, her third forename recognising the Fairbrother heritage. Pip's relationship with Toby fell apart, and since September 2023 Pip has found romance with Stella Pryor, who managed Home Farm.

Josh Archer, played by Sam Wilkinson, who made his first appearance in the episode broadcast on 19 October 2026, previously played by Angus Imrie, who made his first appearance during the episode broadcast on 13 September 1997. He was originally played by Cian Cheesbrough. Josh is Ruth and David Archer's elder son, and Pip and Ben's brother. Growing up, Josh helped his parents out around the farm. He also took part in a spate of graffiti around the village, for which he was grounded. Josh later partnered with Neil Carter in a free-range egg business, before launching his own business buying, renovating, and selling farm vehicles.

Ben Archer, played by Ben Norris. Ben is David and Ruth Archer's younger son and Pip and Josh's brother, having been born on 15 March 2002, delivered by his father on the kitchen floor. He has had a remarkably quiet childhood as Brookfield has been less important in the village with Bridge Farm elbowing other farms out of the spotlight. He has spent much time playing computer games with Rúairi Donovan (Brian Aldridge's son) and since gaining a voice they have taken a huge interest in off-road driving and Ben helped Jill in the kitchen at Christmas. Ben debuted on 28 October 2018. As a reward for his misdemeanours and to get him interested in farming Ben is now training the new sheepdog, Bess. He is training to be a nurse but after a mental health crisis took a break from his studies.

== The Grundy family ==
Grundy family tree

Joe | Susan
Alf | Eddie | Clarrie
Andrew | Nic | William | Emma | Edward
Mia | Jake | Poppy | George | Keira

The Grundys were minor characters until the early 1980s, when they were developed to be a working-class foil to the Archer family.

Alf Grundy (born 13 November 1944), Joe's elder son and a rogue. Appears intermittently in the series and is usually up to no good.

Eddie Grundy (born 15 March 1951) (Trevor Harrison) is Joe's younger son and Clarrie's husband. During their marriage he was unrequitedly enamoured of Jolene Rogers (later Perks, now Archer), his partner in a country and western double act. Eddie's hopes of a career in music appear to have been permanently dashed. He has a history of involving himself in numerous dubious money-making schemes and at one point stood trial for unwittingly selling condemned meat. He mainly makes his living by raising turkeys for Christmas, laying patios and selling novelty garden gnomes. He makes cider and kept a pig called Barbarella. Joe participated in some of Eddie's money-making schemes; at other times he scolded his son: legality never dictates his response.

Clarrie Grundy née Larkin (born 12 May 1954) (Heather Bell, part created by Bell and also formerly played by Fiona Mathieson and Rosalind Adams) is Eddie Grundy's long-suffering wife, having married him in 1982. She became involved with him after her father, Jethro, employed him to remove the range in their home. Clarrie spends much of her time sorting out problems created by her husband and sons. She works at the dairy at Bridge Farm, where Pat Archer is a good friend, and formerly worked behind the bar at the Bull. In 2011 she was responsible for an outbreak of E-Coli at Bridge Farm.

William "Will" Grundy (born 9 February 1983) (Philip Molloy) is the elder son of Eddie and Clarrie. Formerly a gamekeeper for Borchester Land where his boss was Brian Aldridge. In August 2004 he married Emma Carter and they had a son, George, but she harboured a dark secret: while engaged to Will she enjoyed two one-night stands with his brother, Ed, one on her hen night, leading her to believe that Ed was George's father. Eventually she left Will for Ed, taking George with her, although George was later shown by DNA paternity testing to be Will's child. Will's existing rivalry with Ed became even more intense: to Clarrie's despair the brothers engaged in physical tussles and bitter arguments over Emma and George. In 2008 he was left £120,000 by a relative, and bought the Carters' former home from Matt Crawford, a property his friend Roy Tucker had been interested in. Will and Ed's rivalry culminated in a fight in which Will nearly killed Ed, and Will moved temporarily to another gamekeeping job in Gloucestershire. Christmas 2008 saw Will reunite with ex-girlfriend Nic, whom he originally split from when he saw her hit George. After returning to Ambridge in February 2009, Will pushed for Nic and her 2 children (Jake (then 4) and Mia (then 2)), to move back in with him: they did, and in 2010 Nic started occasional bar work at The Bull, a career move which traditionally leads to expanded roles. 1 January 2012 saw Will and Nic get married at the local Grey Gables Hotel followed by a honeymoon in Cape Verde which on their return led to the renaming of their cottage to Greenwood. Will's dog is called Meg. Will and Nic have a daughter Poppy. Nic died unexpectedly of sepsis in February 2018. Despite being severely affected by her death, Will's pride and stubbornness prevented him from seeking counselling for his grief, and his worsened temper and aggression led to him driving away both Jake and Mia, leaving him with only his biological daughter, Poppy.

Ed Grundy (born 28 September 1984) (Barry Farrimond) is the younger son of Eddie and Clarrie. Ed took up his father's interest in music and aspired to be in a band. A farm labourer, Ed secured a job in France and planned to move there secretly with Emma and George, but they were thwarted in November 2005 by Will. In May 2006, Ed vanished after Emma left the caravan and moved into her parents' home, saying it was for the sake of her baby's health. He remained missing, despite a police investigation into his disappearance, until July 2006 when he was admitted to hospital after being beaten up while sleeping rough in Borchester. Whilst living as a vagrant, he had become addicted to alcohol and crack cocaine. Ed had a history of drug use and petty crime including joyriding. On returning to the village, Ed at first sought refuge with mentor and past employer, Oliver Sterling, who did his best to help him face his demons and abandon his vices. With the additional help of family support and counselling Ed has made major steps towards recovery, demonstrated by his increased dedication to Oliver Sterling's dairy farm. In April 2011 their daughter, Keira Susan, was born. In late 2012, financial troubles reflecting earlier reductions in milk prices forced the couple to move back in with Emma's parents.

Emma Grundy, née Carter (born 7 August 1984) (Emerald O'Hanrahan, formerly played by Felicity Jones) is the daughter of Susan and Neil Carter, who were horrified when their daughter announced she was marrying into the Grundy family. When Will discovered her infidelity with his brother, she moved with Ed and baby George to a caravan outside her parents' home. A parental testing showed that despite Emma's certainty to the contrary, George was Will's son. She returned to live with her parents in 2006, but moved out to live at a cottage on Brookfield Farm with Ed and George as a family together. New daughter Keira was born in 2011 and following financial problems, they returned to live with Emma's parents in 2012. In late 2019, Emma and Ed briefly separated, though they have since reconciled.

George Grundy (born 7 April 2005) (Angus Stobie) is the son of Will and Emma. He was an ambitious young man, who was working to establish himself in drone photography, until a disastrous night when he found Alice Aldridge drunk and asleep in her car and sought to bring her home. Losing control of the car he forced another vehicle into the River Am, returned the still unconscious Alice to the driver's seat and lied to police about the accident. When the truth came out he was convicted of perverting the course of justice and imprisoned for a year. Following his release he struggling to find a role in society.

Mia Grundy (born 20 January 2006) (Molly Pipe) is Will's step-daughter: his late wife Nic's child by her former partner Andrew. As of 2021 she is a vegetarian, climate change activist and opponent of hunting.

== The Aldridge family ==
Aldridge family tree

Jennifer
Ian Craig | Adam Macy | Debbie
Alexander

Brian
Kate | Lucas Madikane | Alice | Chris Carter | Rúairi
Phoebe | Noluthando | Sipho | Martha

Brian Aldridge (born Brian Jeremy Aldridge, 20 November 1943) (Charles Collingwood), considered by some to be the villain of the serial, is sometimes seen as one of the most interesting and subtle characters. Widower of Jack and Peggy Archer's daughter Jennifer, he is primarily a farmer, but has interests in a number of businesses, including Borchester Land. and a former partnership in Tom Archer's sausage business. Brian has had several extramarital affairs during his marriage to Jennifer, including at least one with (the then) Caroline Bone (1985) and more recently with the Irish-born translator Siobhán Hathaway (Caroline Lennon), which produced his only son, Rúairi. He has an uncomfortable relationship with his stepson, Adam, which was the source of some friction with his wife. Brian's somewhat cavalier attitude to regulations came back to haunt him, when it transpired that in the 1970s he had taken money to allow the dumping of toxic chemicals on Home Farm land, which by the late 2010s had started to leak into the Am. Brian was prosecuted by the Environment Agency and forced to retire from active management of the farm. To pay his fines he and Jenny were forced to sell the farmhouse and move into rented accommodation. Jenny died on 22 January 2023.

Adam Macy (born 22 June 1967) (Andrew Wincott) is the first child of Jennifer Aldridge, his father being former Brookfield farmhand Paddy Redmond (only confirmed by Jennifer herself in 2015.) Adam was adopted by Roger Travers-Macy, Jennifer's first husband. Adam lived abroad for many years, mainly in Kenya, helping breed goats, but came back to the family farm when a major relationship broke up. After a year or so, he fell in love with Ian Craig, the chef at Grey Gables. Ian and Adam's relationship has elicited little moral outrage or criticism in the village, with the exception of Sid Perks, the late landlord of the pub, and Adam's grandmother Peggy Woolley, who was distinctly uncomfortable. Adam and Ian considered embarking on parenthood; Ian had plans to artificially inseminate his old friend, Madds, and share responsibility for the child they hoped to produce, but Madds then fell in love with another man and changed her mind. The producers of The Archers maintain this was a very popular plot nationwide. Ian proposed to Adam and the pair entered a civil partnership on 14 December 2006. In mid-2012, Adam suffered a blow to the head while attempting to stop a robbery, but has since recovered. Once again, Adam and Ian contemplated parenthood; in 2019, surrogate and friend Lexi gave birth to Alexander Macy-Craig (Xander).

Debbie Aldridge, formerly Gerrard, née Travers-Macy (born 24 December 1970) (Tamsin Greig) is the daughter of Jennifer and Roger Travers-Macy, but chooses to use the surname of her stepfather Brian. After a spell at the University of Exeter she returned home to get away from a relationship with Canadian lecturer Simon Gerrard (Garrick Hagon); years later Debbie got involved with Simon again and in spite of Brian's forebodings they were married. However, Debbie subsequently discovered that Simon was being unfaithful, and they divorced. When Adam returned from Africa, a bout of sibling rivalry erupted: to a certain extent, this remains ongoing, although there are indications that Adam and Debbie are reaching an understanding. Debbie is currently based in Hungary, where she runs the estate owned by a consortium to which Brian belongs (this gives the actress, Tamsin Greig, who has moved on to other projects, the ability to appear in the show from time to time). She occasionally visits home; and the installation of a new webcam also allows Debbie to talk and appear to everyone via computer. Debbie briefly returned to Ambridge again in 2011 with a proposal, now implemented, to build a super intensive dairy farm, which would go on to be run by Rob Titchener.

Kate Madikane, née Aldridge (born 30 September 1977) (Perdita Avery, formerly played by Kellie Bright and Susie Riddell), is the elder daughter of Brian and Jennifer. Kate inherited her mother's hippie tendencies, but her narcissistic personality was unique to her. She gave birth to her daughter Phoebe in a tipi at the Glastonbury Festival. Roy Tucker is the father, with whom Phoebe lives in Ambridge. Kate emigrated to Johannesburg, South Africa where she married Lucas Madikane (Connie M'Gadzah). She had another daughter, Noluthando ("Nolly") and, born July 2007, a son, Sipho (Xhosa for 'gift'). In 2015, she returned to Ambridge, supposedly to enrol in another course at Felpersham University, but Phoebe subsequently discovered that Lucas, upon learning that Kate had been having yet another affair, had ended their marriage and thrown her out. In 2011, previous voice actor Susie Riddell returned to the show, this time playing Tracey Horrobin.

Alice Carter, née Aldridge (born 29 September 1988) (Hollie Chapman), the younger daughter of Brian and Jennifer, studied engineering at Southampton University. Her best friend is the vicar's daughter, Amy Franks. She likes horses and has a horse, Spearmint. She is friends with both Adam and Debbie. In considering joining the RAF, who ultimately rejected her application, she came into conflict with Amy's pacifist views. In 2010 she married Chris Carter (below), the farrier son of Neil and Susan. She graduated from Felpersham University with a master's degree and worked as an aeronautical engineer before being fired over her drinking. While pregnant she finally started receiving treatment for alcoholism. On 9 March 2021 she gave birth to a baby girl, Martha.

Phoebe Aldridge (Lucy Morris) was born on 28 June 1998 in a tipi in the former Tipi Field at Glastonbury Festival, and lived with her father Roy Tucker and his wife Hayley until their relationship broke up in 2014. She lived with Brian and Jennifer until she became exasperated with her mother Kate's thoughtlessness during her A-levels and moved back in with Roy. She studied at Oxford University and was leader of a rewilding scheme aiming at improving the natural life around Ambridge along with Pip Archer and Rex Fairbrother until moving to Scotland for a new job.

Rúairi Donovan (born 14 November 2002) (Arthur Hughes since 2018) is the son of Brian Aldridge and Siobhán Hathaway. His persistent Irish accent – despite his having been born and raised during his earliest years in Germany and, after only the briefest of stays with his Irish grandmother, educated for several years since then in England – was criticised in the BBC's Feedback programme as implausible, since young children rapidly adapt their accent to their surroundings. He no longer has an Irish accent, following a change of actor in 2012.

== The Pargetter family ==
Pargetter family tree

Julia
Nigel | Elizabeth
Lily | Freddie

Elizabeth Pargetter, née Archer (Alison Dowling) is Phil and Jill's younger daughter and, along with Kenton, at first rejected village life, attempting a career in publicity in London. She returned to Ambridge but endured a disastrous relationship with local businessman Cameron Fraser (which led to Elizabeth having an abortion) before finally marrying Nigel Pargetter after a relationship some years before. Elizabeth and Nigel developed their stately home, Lower Loxley, as a conference venue. Elizabeth, born with a heart defect, became pregnant and had twins, Lily and Freddie, but the strain of the pregnancy on her heart meant that she soon afterwards had to undergo a heart valve replacement operation. Elizabeth is highly critical of the way David manages the Brookfield estate, and is very concerned to ensure that her family receives its due portion of the estate. Elizabeth's mother-in-law Julia lived in the family pile until her demise in 2005. She was highly critical of Elizabeth, who was married to her son Nigel until his death from a fall in January 2011.

Lily Rosalind and Frederick Hugo "Freddie" Pargetter (Katie Redford and Toby Laurence, formerly played by Georgie Feller and Jack Firth) are Elizabeth and Nigel's twins. They were both born on 12 December 1999 via Caesarean section because of Elizabeth's heart condition. Freddie had to stay in a special care unit for several days as he was underweight. Before his death Nigel wanted his children to take the exams for the Felpersham Cathedral School. Lily is the more easily angered, sarcastic and pretentious twin while Freddie is more sweet-natured and very sensitive, though also more cocky and moody at times. In October 2018 Freddie was given a 12-month youth detention order for dealing in narcotics.

== The Carter family ==
Carter family tree

Neil | Susan
Ed Grundy | Emma Grundy | Will Grundy | Christopher | Alice Aldridge
Keira | George | Martha

Neil Carter (born 22 May 1957) (Brian Hewlett) is another business failure. Susan wanted him to be a white collar worker but he decided that he was a pigman at heart. He used to be Tom's partner in a piggery. The family lived in a caravan, after selling their house, until he finished a self-build house on his own land. He dislikes all Grundys but especially Ed, who, until his disappearance, lived in the caravan with Emma and George.

Susan Carter, née Horrobin (born 10 October 1963) (Charlotte Martin), the village gossip, briefly became the most notorious Archers character ever when her imprisonment at Christmas 1993 for shielding her armed-robber brother Clive Horrobin led to the launch of the "Free the Ambridge One" campaign. Questions were asked in the House of Commons of then–Home Secretary Michael Howard. Her aspirational tendencies took a hammering when daughter Emma married into the Grundy family in 2004, but in 2006 she was approved by the Royal Mail for the position of sub-postmistress despite her criminal record. She had previously worked for several years at the village shop and post office, and as Tom Archer's assistant in his sausage-making business. Clive Horrobin returned to the village to visit their dying mother in October 2011.

Christopher Carter (born 22 June 1988) (Wilf Scolding, formerly played by Will Sanderson-Thwaite) is the younger offspring of the Carter family. His mother had some difficulty bonding with him when he was born with a cleft lip. Now a farrier by occupation, a few years ago he had a brief relationship with Venetia, the daughter of a prominent Borsetshire family. His mother rather desperately encouraged this, to Neil's disapproval, but the couple soon found themselves incompatible, and Christopher finished the liaison. He began seeing Alice to the barely concealed delight of his social-climbing mother and the scarcely concealed horror of Alice's mother, Jennifer Aldridge. The couple married unexpectedly in Las Vegas during a 2010 summer holiday. Their first child, Martha Carter, was born prematurely in March 2021.

Tracy Horrobin (Susie Riddell) is the younger sister of Susan Carter and frequently a great embarrassment to her. A single mother to Brad and Chelsea, she was a long running silent character before finding a voice. After bouncing between dead end jobs for years she convinced Oliver Sterling that she would be a breath of fresh air at Grey Gables, where she worked with Lynda Snell as a receptionist before being made redundant when the hotel was shut down; she then worked at a chicken factory until she was fired, and now works at the Bull. When the village cricket team opened itself to female players she joined the team, eventually winning an election to become team captain. She is an erratic bowler, who often has to be stopped from excessive sledging. Susie Riddell had previously voiced Kate Aldridge but left the series to pursue other projects before returning as Tracy.

== Other Ambridge residents ==
Sergeant Harrison Burns, played by James Cartwright, is a member of the local police force. Although based in Borchester he lives in Woodbine Cottage, Ambridge, with his wife, Fallon. Prior to their marriage the relationship hit a rocky patch when Burns arrested Fallon's father for drug dealing but they managed to get past this major obstacle until their separation in 2026.

Ian Craig, played by Stephen Kennedy, is the husband of Adam Macy. A confidant and comforter of many a troubled resident, the former Grey Gables chef is socially easy-going and affable. However, Ian can be outspoken with his husband when he thinks Adam has overstepped the mark. His untiring support for Adam's grandmother Peggy while she cared for Jack revealed him to be not only a rock of sense but genuinely caring.

Alan Franks, played by John Telfer, is the latest in a series of eccentric village vicars, was appointed to Ambridge and neighbouring parishes in 2003, moving from Nottingham where he had previously worked as an accountant and a non-stipendiary minister. He was widowed before moving to Ambridge and is the father of Amy, a midwife. In late 2005, his blossoming relationship with Usha Gupta, a Hindu, caused some unease to some of his parishioners, including Shula Hebden Lloyd. In March 2008, Alan and Usha became engaged, to the opposition of his former mother-in-law Mabel (Mona Hammond) and Usha's Aunt Satya, and her parents. They married in summer 2008 and Usha's family have warmed to the idea and attended the wedding, though Mabel did not.

Usha Franks (née Gupta), played by Souad Faress and formerly by Sudha Bhuchar, works as a solicitor in Felpersham and is one of very few ethnic minority characters in the series. On moving into the village, Usha was the subject of a harassment campaign by a racist gang which included Roy Tucker. To offer support and protection, the local GP, Richard Locke (William Gaminara), then her lover, moved into her house, Blossom Hill Cottage, shortly afterwards. Two members of the gang, Spanner Bridges (so called because he used a spanner (wrench) as a weapon) and Craven, were charged, and while Craven pleaded guilty and got a lesser sentence, Spanner was convicted and sentenced, his bike being sold and the proceeds given to Usha. Much later, when she discovered that Locke had slept with her best friend Shula Hebden (on an occasion when Shula was vulnerable and he took advantage of his position as family doctor) she ended the relationship and threw him out, also ending her friendship with Shula (whom she told off with relish, they are now arch-enemies). More recently, some local parishioners made complaints to the bishop when Alan, the vicar, began a relationship with Usha (who is Hindu). These two threads are linked by Shula's possible involvement in this disapproval and her resignation as churchwarden. Usha was also regularly on the receiving end of 'helpful' advice about her unmarried status by her Aunt Satya (Jamila Massey), an occasional visitor to Ambridge from Usha's home town of Wolverhampton, who attempted to match-make for her on numerous occasions, with cousins from home. The character of Usha is said to be based on Kamlesh Bahl, former Vice President of the Law Society.

Jack "Jazzer" McCreary, played by Ryan Kelly, is a pigman (working for Tom Archer) and milkman (working for Mike Tucker). Jazzer started out as a general ne'er-do-well, engaging in burglary and drug abuse, before settling down a little and holding down two jobs. While still a heavy drinker, with a profound dislike of either healthy food or housework, he then evolved into the village lothario, seducing several women on his milk round. Despite this he held a torch for Fallon Rogers, who normally insisted that they should remain friends. Occasionally Jazzer manages to surprise everyone with a sensitive side, such as when he wowed the audience of Ambridge's Got Talent with his heartfelt rendition of a Scottish folk song ("Roses of Prince Charlie"). He has begun a caring relationship with Tracy Horrobin, sister of Susan Carter, and the couple were married in September 2023. (The actor Ryan Kelly is visually impaired, unlike his character.)

Kirsty Miller, played by Annabelle Dowler, worked at Ambridge Organics and the Jaxx Bar. Kirsty was in a relationship with Tom Archer before he broke up with her for someone else. She then dated Sam Batton, who ended the relationship because he was in love with Ruth Archer. In 2013 Kirsty and Tom got back together and became engaged. He jilted her at the altar. She was good friends with Tom's sister Helen, but they fell out when Kirsty discovered that Helen had known before the wedding day that Tom had doubts. Kirsty returned to Ambridge several months later, got a job at Grey Gables, and moved in with Roy Tucker while also making amends with Helen and the rest of the family. Her time away meant that she saw clearly the changes in both Helen's appearance and her personality following her marriage to Rob Titchener; this immediately alerted her to the fact that something was very wrong with Helen's relationship, and was the only person to spot the signs that he was abusing her emotionally. Eventually, after persuading Helen to meet Jess, Rob's ex-wife, she was horrified when Helen decided to confront Rob about his behaviour, a confrontation that led to Helen stabbing him. After having a one-night stand with Tom shortly after the trial, Kirsty became pregnant with his son and despite her initial reservations decided to keep the baby. However, a couple of weeks later she miscarried. After initially repressing her grief, Kirsty eventually agreed to take compassionate leave, and grieved properly. Tom's handling of both the pregnancy and the miscarriage ultimately proved to be the final nail in the coffin of any lingering romantic feelings she had for him. Kirsty married local builder Phillip Moss, though their relationship ended once it was revealed that his business was viable only through modern slavery.

Stella Pryor, played by Lucy Speed, was until recently the manager of Home Farm. She is friends with Ruth Archer (Felicity Finch) and had a rescue greyhound called Weaver, who had to be euthanized after suffering fatal injuries when he was hit by a trailer whilst chasing after a hare. In August 2023, she and Pip Archer (Daisy Badger) shared the show's first on-air lesbian kiss.

Fallon Rogers, played by Joanna van Kampen, is Jolene's daughter from her first marriage to Wayne Tucson. When younger Fallon was the lead singer of local rock band Little White Lies, when not running the Upstairs@the Bull music venue and working as a barmaid. Fallon was perennially unlucky in love: either falling for men who weren't interested, or getting the wrong men to fall for her. Jazzer McCreary and Ed Grundy were involved with Fallon at various times. Fallon runs the Bridge farm café with Emma Grundy and upcycles furniture as well as undertaking catering for local dos.

Fallon's long-term relationship with and 2018 marriage to PC Harrison Burns provided stability and she is now a fixture in village life until their separation in 2026. Fallon's drive to modernise village life has caused friction with older characters such as Lynda Snell, who resigned from the 2016 fête committee after an argument with Fallon and with Shula Hebden Lloyd who felt pushed out of catering the village cricket teas when Fallon took over following Harrison's appointment as captain. Fallon and Harrison initially rented Woodbine Cottage from Christine Barford and, having decided it was too small and were moving, they changed their minds, buying the property when Christine decided to sell.

Lynda Snell MBE, played by Carole Boyd, lives at Ambridge Hall with her husband, Robert Snell. They moved to Ambridge from Sunningdale in 1986 and she was originally resented as an outsider, a do-gooder and incomer. She is a keen gardener and was often involved in disputes with her neighbour, Joe Grundy (now deceased). In 2003 she acquired two llamas, Wolfgang and Constanza (named after Mozart and his wife), which have been known to roam around the village. In May 2007 Constanza gave birth to a cria, which Lynda named Salieri, reassuring one acquaintance that the legend of Salieri murdering Mozart was a myth. She attempts to produce a play every Christmas (an Archers in-joke; but not in 2020), and often drives villagers to distraction in her attempts to fill parts. In 2004–05 Lynda ran a campaign to renovate the former Cat & Fiddle pub, but despite the help of Griff Rhys Jones the scheme failed and the building was earmarked to become flats. In January 2006 Lynda was elected to the parish council alongside Lilian Bellamy. According to a BBC survey she is the most annoying character on the show, although this is regarded as praise by the production team, since she is intended to be so.

She is known for her direction of the annual village theatre productions. Before she was injured in an explosion and fire at the Grey Gables Hotel in March 2020 Lynda had been campaigning against Lilian Bellamy's plans to revamp The Bull under the title "The B @ Ambridge". Lilian told a still-recovering Lynda that the pub would be returning to the original name of The Bull. In the 2021 new year's honours list Lynda Snell received an MBE, for which she had been nominated "by the community".

Robert Snell, played by Michael Bertenshaw and formerly by Dr Graham Blockey, moved to Ambridge with his wife Lynda Snell (Carole Boyd) in 1986. Robert was employed as a computer expert. He found work in this area hard to obtain and has capitalised on his DIY skills to set up a small business doing general building work. He has two daughters from a previous relationship; Coriander, who goes by the name "Cas", and Leonie, played by Jasmine Hyde. Coriander has a son called Oscar. Leonie is involved with James Bellamy; they have a son, Mungo. Robert and Lynda run a B&B at Ambridge Hall. Robert also carries out odds jobs for residents and enjoys birdwatching.

Blockey, who was also a full-time GP, died in December 2022. Of his portrayal of Robert, editor Jeremy Howe stated "Graham Blockey's Robert was a quiet wonder to behold – the perfect foil to the exuberant idiosyncrasies of Lynda, sort of Wise to her Morecambe." In February 2024, it was announced that the role had been recast to Michael Bertenshaw, who said he was "so excited" about joining the cast. He added "The Archers family has been wonderfully welcoming, and I'm looking forward to getting embroiled in the Ambridge goings-on, and to striving to be a worthy foil to dear Lyndy. She's not always the easiest of people to get along with, but fortunately Carole Boyd, who plays Lynda, is unmanaged joy. It's going to be such fun." Bertenshaw's first episode was broadcast on 17 March 2024.

Oliver Sterling, played by Michael Cochrane, was married, between 2006 and her death in 2017, to Caroline. He arrived in Ambridge as a gentleman farmer and huntsman and bought Grange Farm from the estate. Initially he employed Ed Grundy to manage his dairy herd. In March 2008 he had problems with the herd being infected by Bovine TB. He subsequently sold the enterprise to Ed and "retired properly". He was the owner of Grey Gables until he sold it in 2022, and he continues to own Grange Farm, with the farmhouse rented to Eddie and Clarrie Grundy whilst the land is rented by Ed Grundy for Texel sheep.

Carol Tregorran (née Grey), played by Mia Soteriou in 2026 until the characters death, formerly voiced by Eleanor Bron and Anne Cullen, first appeared in 1954. Carol was originally married to Ambridge landowner Charles Grenville until his death. She then, eventually, married John Tregorran. She was a successful businesswoman running a market garden in Ambridge (and subsequently a wine business). She departed in 1980, but returned to Ambridge in 2014 renting Glebe Cottage from Jill Archer, following her husband's death. During 2016 her daughter, the Birmingham barrister Anna Tregorran, successfully defended Helen Archer in the latter's trial for attempted murder.

== Recurring characters ==
Clive Horrobin (born 9 November 1972) (Alex Jones) is the brother of Susan Carter; he has spent much of his life in prison, but, to the consternation of many, is an occasional visitor to Ambridge. He conducted an armed siege at the village shop in 1993, in 1997 assaulted gamekeeper George Barford (knocking him unconscious), and set fire to the Barfords' home in 2004, gutting the building. In October 2011, he returned to the village to visit his ailing mother. In late 2012, Clive was sent back to prison after breaking the terms of his licence and entering Ambridge to confront his sister, Tracy, and his brother's wife, Donna. In August 2024, Clive returned to Ambridge with his great nephew George Grundy.

Satya Khanna (Auntie Satya; Jamila Massey) An occasional visitation upon long-suffering niece Usha Gupta. Forever trying to give Usha unwanted relationship advice or a welcome shoulder to cry on, and architect of numerous failed matchmaking ruses. Thanks to Usha's parents' disapproval of their daughter's lifestyle, Satya provides the main link with her family. No mean cook, Satya often arrives bearing food parcels for her culinarily inept niece.

== Former principal characters ==
Over the years some of the original cast members have died, left the show or retired, and their characters have had to be replaced or killed off by the scriptwriters. One of those was the character of Simon Cooper (Eddie Robinson) a farm hand working on the farm from the very first pilot episode until his death in 1956.

=== Archer family and relations ===
Shula Hebden Lloyd, née Archer, previously Hebden (born Shula Mary Archer, 8 August 1958) (Judy Bennett) is the elder daughter of Phil and Jill and twin sister of Kenton. Her first husband, Mark Hebden, a solicitor, was killed in a road accident in 1994 that also involved her best friend Caroline Bone (later Sterling). Shula and Mark's son Daniel was born after the death of his father as a result of IVF treatment after a long struggle with infertility. Some years after Mark's death, Shula had an affair with the village doctor (who was himself living with Shula's hitherto good friend Usha Gupta), thus two-timing her boyfriend Alistair (the local vet) whom she subsequently married. This was in the context of Shula's devout Christianity and membership of the local Parish Council. She owned and ran the riding stables which formerly belonged to Christine Barford, her aunt. She used once to have great fun with her best friend, Caroline, but later Caroline became engrossed in her relationship with her husband Oliver Sterling and their business activities. After her marriage to Alistair, Shula lost her lightheartedness and became rather dour, self-centred and even, at times, sanctimonious, as evidenced by her attitude to the marriage to Usha Gupta, a Hindu, of the vicar, to whom Shula had been 'right-hand woman' for the parish. Coping with the childhood arthritis of her son, Daniel, did not help, nor did her husband's gambling addiction, which nearly destroyed their marriage before he finally admitted to owing huge sums to Matt Crawford and others. The couple resolved to stay together; they remortgaged the business to pay off the debts and Alistair attended Gamblers Anonymous meetings. Daniel was expected to go to university to read law in his father's footsteps, but upset his mother by joining the Royal Tank Regiment, though later she accepted his choice of career. In 2018, Shula stunned Alistair when she told him their marriage was over. Now divorced, they are still good friends and probably closer than they had been in the last few years of their marriage. In 2019, Shula surprised her family when she announced her intention to take the initial steps to becoming a Church of England vicar. She moved to Sunderland in 2022 for work, when the actor retired.

Peggy Woolley, née Perkins, formerly Archer (born Margaret Perkins, 13 November 1924 - 8 May 2025) (June Spencer, briefly played by Thelma Rogers) was the widow of Phil's elder brother, Jack Archer (d. 1972), and of Jack Woolley (d. 2014). When married to Jack Archer, they managed (and later owned) the Bull. After many years of close friendship, Peggy married Jack Woolley. Peggy had two daughters, Jennifer and Lilian, and a son, Tony, by her first husband. She was indulgent of her grandchildren and provided several of them with significant financial support. Although she was something of a left wing firebrand in her youth she became more conservative as she aged. She spent her final years living in The Lodge which was the gatehouse for Grey Gables. She became a silent character in 2022, when the actor retired at the age of 103.

Jennifer Aldridge, née Archer (7 January 1945 – 22 January 2023) (Angela Piper) was the elder daughter of Peggy Woolley by her first husband, Jack Archer. In early years her character was the hippie of the Archer family, her first child, Adam, being — sensationally at the time — the illegitimate result of a fling with a cowman, Paddy Redmond. She married a travelling businessman, Roger Travers-Macy, in the late 1960s and had a daughter, Debbie. She then divorced him and married Brian Aldridge. With Brian she had two daughters, Kate and Alice. Jennifer endured Brian's series of affairs over the years, partly by having one affair with her ex-husband, though Brian has long suspected John Tregorran as having rivalled him for Jennifer's affections at one time. Jennifer died in January 2023 when the actor retired due to ill-health.

Daniel "Dan" Archer (Harry Oakes, Monte Crick, Edgar Harrison and Frank Middlemass), son of the elder John Archer, was the first owner of Brookfield when the family bought it from Squire Lawson-Hope. He was patriarch of the Archer family. The character survived the deaths of the first three actors before finally being killed off in 1986. Elizabeth witnessed his fatal attempt to rescue a sheep in difficulty on Lakey Hill, despite her pleading with him not to.

Doris Evelyn Rebecca Archer (Gwen Berryman MBE), née Forrest, Dan's wife, mother of Jack, Phil and Christine Archer and sister of Tom Forrest. Her death was discovered by Shula in 1980 when she and Christine were visiting Glebe Cottage. Doris was a stalwart of village life and provided a listening ear to an ever-growing Archer family from the 1950s to 1980. She was originally a kitchen maid at Manor House, the ancestral home of the Lawson-Hope family, and she became lady's maid to Letty Lawson-Hope.

Grace Archer (Monica Grey and Ysanne Churchman) was Phil Archer's first wife and the first major character to be killed off. The episode featuring her death was first broadcast on 22 September 1955. The previous night, which happened to be the night that ITV, the UK's first commercial television channel was launched, she received fatal injuries while trying to rescue her horse, Midnight, from a fire. This was seen as a ploy to keep loyal viewers and listeners away from the new station. Her catchphrase was "one fried egg or two, Phil?"

John "Jack" Archer (Denis Folwell), son of Dan, elder brother of Phil and Christine, first husband of Peggy, née Perkins, later Woolley, father of Jennifer, Lilian and Tony; died in 1972 of liver failure. Jack and Peggy managed (and later owned) the Bull, and Jack had suffered increasingly from alcoholism and excessive gambling.

Phil Archer (Norman Painting) younger son of Dan and long-time patriarch of the Archer family and a leading resident of the village. Phil Archer died on 12 February 2010.

Aunt Laura (Gwenda Wilson and Betty McDowall), New Zealander, widow of Dan's younger brother, Frank; she fulfilled a similar dramatic role to Lynda Snell who now lives in Aunt Laura's former home, Ambridge Hall. In 1985 Aunt Laura fell into a ditch and listeners were treated to her forlorn cries while owls hooted overhead. She was found alive and spent a week in hospital being treated for pneumonia but died of heart failure soon after being discharged on St Valentine's Day while her friend Freddy Danby read to her from Moby-Dick.

Tom Forrest (George Hart and Bob Arnold) was Doris Archer's brother and a gamekeeper. He was a major character for many years and used to introduce the omnibus edition on Sunday mornings. In 1957 he was charged with manslaughter after shooting poacher Bob Larkin. He was cleared at trial.

Mark Charles Timothy Hebden (Richard Derrington), first husband of Shula Archer. Died while driving home from work when he swerved to avoid hitting Caroline, whose horse had thrown her on being frightened by a speeding car, and crashed into a tree. He never knew that he was finally to become a father.

Julia Pargetter-Carmichael, mother of Nigel Pargetter (she also had a daughter called Camilla who wasn't seen); mother in-law of Elizabeth Archer (whom she disliked at first, because she wanted Nigel to marry into the wealthy Aldridge family, but grew to love Elizabeth later on after the birth of her beloved grandchildren, Freddie and Lily) and sometime entertainer, died from a stroke in 2005, shortly after the actress who played her, Mary Wimbush, died, also from a stroke, aged 81.

Nigel Gerald Pargetter (8 June 1959 – 2 January 2011) (played by Graham Seed, formerly by Nigel Caliburn who is now known as Nigel Carrington) was the eccentric pseudo-aristocratic owner of Lower Loxley Hall, a mansion on the outskirts of Ambridge. Making his debut in 1983, he was once considered to be somewhat dim and irresponsible, wearing a gorilla suit at a hunt ball in 1983, inadvertently joy riding with Shula Archer in 1984 and driving an ice-cream van as 'Mr Snowy' in 1986. Initially, Nigel was romantically linked with Shula (or "Shulie" as he called her), but in 1984 he became involved with Elizabeth Archer, finding her totally unlike Shula: she tricked him into helping her abscond from school in September 1984. On the death of his father a few years later, he strove to save his ancestral home, and involved Elizabeth, now also more mature, as his marketing manager. He saved the hall for his family. Married to Elizabeth for some years and the father of twins Lily and Freddie (born 12 December 1999), he was convicted of drink-driving in 2003. Nigel (who also had a never-seen sister, Camilla who was married to a man named James) had only intermittent help from his beloved mother, Julia; more often she was a source of anxiety and friction (due to her dislike of Elizabeth, which, happily ceased once Freddie and Lily were born), but she died suddenly in November 2005. Nigel developed a number of vague resemblances to Prince Charles. He became concerned about the environment and tried to become "green". He also took an interest in his family history, particularly in his late Uncle Rupert. Nigel died after falling from the roof of Lower Loxley Hall while attempting, after an evening party, to take down a New Year's banner in icy conditions. The accident occurred as part of The Archers 60th anniversary broadcast on 2 January 2011.

=== Other major characters ===
Marjorie Antrobus – Archers' creator Edward J Mason had a real-life neighbour with that name – (Margot Boyd) was from a colonial background in Kenya; she was the widow of Teddy. She gave a talk to the Ambridge Women's Institute in 1984 and moved into Nightingale Farm in 1985. A breeder of Afghan Hounds, Marjorie let out her flat at Nightingale Farm to Ruth and later to Roy and Hayley. She was an occasionally bossy, but well-meaning, do-gooder in the village. After moving to The Laurels retirement home she was a silent character for several years before her death was finally mentioned on 13 August 2008. (Margot Boyd died on 20 May 2008.)

Bert Fry (7 June 1936 – 25 October 2021) (Eric Allan, formerly played by Roger Hume), husband of Freda Fry (deceased, a former silent character), was employed for many years as a farmhand by (initially) Phil and later by David and Ruth until his retirement, after which he continued to undertake casual work. Bert lived in "The Bungalow", which was originally built to house David and Ruth. His portrayal was close to a stereotypical "yokel", like Jethro Larkin and Zebedee Tring before him. The Frys did, however, take a holiday in India when he retired. He composed poetry and won several ploughing contests, and was a regular guide at Lower Loxley. Bert died in The Bull on the episode first aired at 19:05 on 25 October 2021, peacefully nodding off following a game of cribbage with Ben and Ruth Archer. The decision to remove Bert from The Archers followed Eric Allan's decision to retire.

Walter Gabriel (Robert Mawdesley and Chris Gittins), originally a smallholder, was a friend of the Archers and provided comic relief in the years before the Grundy family were given greater prominence. Walter continually tried to romance Mrs Perkins. Walter Gabriel's phrase "Me old pal, me old beauty" remains one of the most enduringly remembered phrases associated with The Archers. He died shortly after his 92nd birthday and the death of the actor Chris Gittins.

Nelson Gabriel (Jack May), Walter's son, was for many years the most disreputable character in the village. He had a shady history. He was charged with the Borchester mail-van robbery in 1967 but was eventually acquitted. After spells in London and Spain he opened a wine bar in Borchester in 1980 and later an antique shop (with Kenton Archer). Finally he suddenly disappeared to South America, where he died in strange circumstances. He had an illegitimate daughter, Rosemary Tarrant, who when she found and introduced herself to him revealed she had become a policewoman.

Joe Grundy (born 18 September 1921) (Edward Kelsey, formerly played by Reg Johnston and Haydn Jones), was the oldest of this well-established local family and often provided comic relief. Joe maintained for many years that the Archer dynasty had robbed them of their estate. After years attempting to keep the family farm afloat, they were made bankrupt in 2000 - an opportunity for the mainly urban audience to witness the personal and family tragedy of farm sales – and were forced to move to a sink estate in Borchester. Joe took this especially hard, and in one of the most harrowing episodes ever broadcast, bludgeoned his beloved ferrets to death with a hammer. The family moved back to Ambridge shortly thereafter. Later he assisted Oliver Sterling in the management of a new dairy herd at Grange Farm. Following the death of Bob Pullen in 2012 Joe became Ambridge's oldest living resident. He died in his sleep at the age of 98 in October 2019.

Sid Perks (Alan Devereux) was landlord of The Bull, Ambridge's village pub. He first came to Ambridge from Birmingham, where he had been sent to borstal for breaking and entering, which made obtaining his publican's licence difficult. He was devastated when his much-loved wife, Polly ("Poll doll"), was killed in a car crash. His subsequent marriage to Kathy ended in divorce but his third marriage, to his affair partner, country singer Jolene, was happier. He displayed vitriolic homophobia towards Sean Myerson, a professional rival, when the latter captained the village cricket team, and again when Adam Macy began a relationship with Ian Craig, the Grey Gables chef. In early 2006 Sid and Jolene were concerned that the decision of Caroline Pemberton to sell her controlling interest in The Bull would threaten its future but were relieved when Lilian bought her share. Sid died of a heart attack on 8 June 2010 while on holiday in New Zealand visiting Lucy, his daughter by his first marriage.

Kathy Perks (Hedli Niklaus), formerly married to Sid, lived at April Cottage with her son Jamie. She was the catering manager at the local golf club and organised occasional film nights at the village hall. Kenton Archer started dating her, intermittently living with her, but they quarrelled when he brought his three-year-old daughter, Meriel, to Ambridge and expected Kathy to look after her. Miserable and alone, Kathy befriended Lower Loxley chef, Owen King (a.k.a. Gareth Taylor, Alex Wallace and latterly Marcus Dixon), but he raped her just before Christmas 2004. It took Kathy some time to trust a man again, and Kenton showed uncharacteristic patience in enabling her to rebuild her self-confidence. She finally reported her trauma to the police in September 2007, after being informed that King had attacked another woman. He was convicted in April 2008. She reacted to the sudden death of Sid, her ex-husband, as if she were the grieving widow, rather than his wife of eight years Jolene, being of little help to their teenage son and undermining her relationship with Kenton, who can do nothing right. After finding that Kenton had had a one-night stand with a customer of his bar, she threw him out. Kathy was at one time Pat Archer's best friend. She was the general manager at Grey Gables until it was sold. From 2015, the character was not heard, but she was still mentioned by other characters in passing. Niklaus briefly returned to the role from 17 April 2022, shortly before Kathy left Borsetshire.

Polly Perkins, known as "Mrs P" (Pauline Seville), a close friend of Dan and Doris Archer and formidable widowed mother of Peggy. She shared a good-natured rivalry with Walter Gabriel, which often played into his unrequited advances towards her. Already a frequent visitor to Ambridge, she moved to the village permanently after the birth of her grandson Tony and she stayed until her second marriage to Arthur Perkins (no relation), afterwards moving to London. She returned after the second Mr Perkins died, remaining in the village for twenty more years until her death in 1991.

John Tregorran (Roger Hume, Basil Jones, Simon Lack and Philip Morant) originally arrived in Ambridge in a gypsy caravan. Thoughtful and provocative, Tregorran was such a popular and charismatic character that listeners at Archers public events still ask about him — and about Carol Grey, whom he eventually married. Tregorran was the author with Jennifer Aldridge of Ambridge: an English village through the ages (really written by William Smethurst); London: Borchester Press in association with Methuen by arrangement with the British Broadcasting Corporation, 1982. Tregorran died in July 2014 and was buried in Ambridge. His widow returned for the funeral and decided to move back to the village, and lived there until her death in 2026.

Tucker family tree

(1) Betty | Mike
Roy | Hayley | Brenda
Phoebe Aldridge | Abigail Tucker

(2) Vicky
Bethany

Betty Tucker (Pamela Craig) wife of Mike, mother of Roy and Brenda. Betty was a popular villager who supported the family even when Mike was violent and depressed. Betty managed the village shop and kept hens and gossiped. An attractive woman, she distinguished herself by successfully resisting the advances of erstwhile village Lothario, Brian Aldridge. Betty died suddenly before Christmas 2005. She was written out of the series when the actress who played her retired and emigrated to New Zealand.

Mike Tucker (born 1 December 1949) (Terry Molloy) lost an eye in a farming accident, for which Brian Aldridge was found responsible. He was regarded as one of the most humourless characters in the village, even before the death of his beloved wife Betty in December 2005. Mike was unsuccessful as a farmer, going bankrupt in 1985, and then ran a milk round in Ambridge. He also undertook occasional tree-surgery work. On New Year's Day 2007, he was run over by Helen Archer, but rescued by Robert Snell. When Tom took the blame, Tucker forbade him from continuing a relationship with Brenda, his daughter. However, after finding out that Helen was driving he became more sympathetic and apologised to Tom. His plan to split Willow Farm in two, so that Roy and Hayley could have a separate home, was initially resisted by Brenda. Mike later married Vicky, a fellow ballroom dancer, who gave birth to their daughter Bethany in January 2013. Bethany had Down syndrome, which led to Mike, Vicky and Bethany moving to Birmingham to ensure the best care for Bethany.

Roy Tucker, played by Ian Pepperell, was formerly part of a teenage gang which perpetrated a series of racist attacks on Usha Gupta; he gave them her address. Realising the error of his ways, he went on to gain a degree in business studies at Felpersham University. He worked at Grey Gables, and was promoted to deputy manager. After Nigel Pargetter's death, he began working at Lower Loxley, initially just to assist Elizabeth. However, he was eventually offered a permanent job there. He had an on/off relationship with Kate Aldridge, which resulted in their daughter Phoebe being born in 1998, but then married Hayley. Roy, Hayley and Phoebe lived with Mike Tucker at Willow Farm. Attempts to find an affordable home for his family met with failure until Mike split Willow Farm in two. Roy had an affair with Elizabeth in 2014 which, though brief, led to the end of his marriage. Pepperell died on 22 December 2023. Paying tribute to him, editor Jeremy Howe stated: "Ian had a lot more gas in the tank and was desperate to return to Ambridge once his health permitted... We will miss him dearly and our hearts go out to his family and friends and everyone who knew him. Ambridge loved Roy – The Archers and our millions of listeners loved Ian's Roy Tucker." Howe said Pepperell played Roy as "genial and anxious, funny and sad, easy-going and permanently stressed – a man who could hold down with ease a top job, yet who always carried with him Hamlet's sense of failure.". Roy emigrated To Bulgaria, looking to rekindle a relationship.

Hayley Tucker, née Jordan (born 1 May 1977) (Lorraine Coady, formerly played by Lucy Davis) comes from Birmingham and first appeared as John Archer's girlfriend. Initially, her urban background led to her being unprepared for rural life. Hayley and John split up (partly due to John's involvement with Sharon Richards) shortly before his death in a tractor accident in 1998. Hayley took over the running of John's pig business after John's death, but eventually his brother Tom took an interest and she handed it back to the Archers. In 2001 she married John's best mate Roy Tucker and became stepmother to Phoebe; she found Kate Aldridge's visits from South Africa to Ambridge uncomfortable. Hayley worked at Lower Loxley as nanny to Freddie and Lily Pargetter, and then as a rather amorphous children's visitor specialist. Despite Betty's sudden death, Hayley remained unhappy at living with her father-in-law and wished that she and Roy had a home of their own. After an 'informational' storyline of difficulty in conceiving, Hayley gave birth to a baby daughter, Abigail (Abbie) on 7 March 2008. The birth was somewhat (the chronology as aired is contradictory) premature and Abbie was expected to remain in hospital until her original due date, although medical practice is 'until 2.5 kilos'. Hayley left Roy in 2014 after discovering the nature of his relationship with Elizabeth Pargetter, eventually moving to Birmingham.

Brenda Tucker (born 21 January 1981) (Amy Shindler) has had some controversial short-term relationships, with Debbie's husband, with Lilian's then (much younger) lover and with Lilian's son. For several years she worked at Radio Borsetshire, until leaving home in 2005 to pursue a media studies degree. She returned home when her mother died suddenly in December 2005. Feeling unable to return to university, leaving her father so soon after Betty's death, she decided to transfer to Felpersham University, planning to return to her studies in September 2006. She started dating Tom Archer following a Valentine kiss after they grew closer in the weeks after her mother's death. After graduating in 2009 she was unable to gain permanent employment apart from a PR job in Leicester, necessitating a daily commute which frustrated Tom. She gave up the effort after a few weeks and joined Amside—Matt and Lilian's new property company. After feeling increasingly badly-treated by Lilian and Matt, she left Amside without notice. She ended her relationship with Tom, saying that she did not want to marry and bear children. She moved to London.

Jack Woolley (19 July 1919 – 2 January 2014) (Arnold Peters, formerly played by Philip Garston-Jones) was a self-made man originally from Stirchley, Birmingham who owned the village shop. He also once owned local country-house hotel Grey Gables (later sold to Oliver and Caroline Sterling), the Borchester Echo (a local newspaper) and other businesses outside the village. He was married to Peggy Woolley until his death (see below). Jack suffered increasingly from Alzheimer's disease and received treatment for it, which led Peggy to take more responsibility for the day-to-day operations of his businesses. In 2005 Peggy tried to persuade her husband to agree to his affairs being governed by power of attorney. At the same time, Jack Woolley's adopted daughter Hazel (various actresses, on this occasion Annette Badland) came over from the United States, after some years of absence. Using the cover of an Internet business and an imaginary step family, she failed in an attempt to con Jack and Peggy and gain control of the Grey Gables hotel and leisure complex. As Jack's condition deteriorated, and after much sensitively presented soul searching on the part of Peggy, he was moved into residential care at The Laurels in 2009, and then suffered a stroke. Jack became a 'silent character' in 2011. He died on 2 January 2014.

Heather Pritchard (Margaret Jackman, formerly played by Joyce Gibbs) Ruth Archer's widowed mother who lived in Prudhoe, Northumberland. She returned to Ambridge in 2008 to look after the family when Ruth had her breast reconstruction surgery and was also in contact with Professor Jim Lloyd, Alistair's father. She returned in 2010 for Phil Archer's funeral, and in 2014 after Ruth's miscarriage. Following a succession of strokes, Heather died en route while moving down to Ambridge on 28 September 2015, after reluctantly leaving her Prudhoe home.

Caroline Sterling, née Bone, formerly Pemberton (born 3 April 1955; died 2017) (Sara Coward) moved to the village in 1977, aged 22, when she was hired by Sid as barmaid in the Bull. Her career took off when in 1979 Jack Woolley offered her a job at Grey Gables and she eventually became manager. Upon Jack's retirement, she and partner Oliver Sterling managed to raise funds to buy the hotel and she became the proprietor. On her arrival she soon attracted the attention of many of the male villagers — she once had an affair with Brian Aldridge, and was romantically linked with former village doctor, Matthew Thorogood, and businessman and one-time estate owner Cameron Fraser (who disappeared with £60,000 of her savings), and she was engaged to non-stipendiary minister and vet Robin Stokes. In 1995 she married the new owner of the estate, Guy Pemberton (Hugh Dickson). After only seven months of marriage he suffered a fatal heart attack and left her the Dower House and a majority share in the Bull (which she sold to Lilian Bellamy, in order to raise funds to buy Grey Gables). When Oliver Sterling moved to the village she began an affair with him and they eventually moved into Grange Farm together. They were married in June 2006. Sara Coward died on 13 February 2017. In the episode of 11 July 2017, it was revealed that Caroline had died suddenly but peacefully at the Sterlings' second home in Italy.

=== Friends and lovers ===
Sophie Barlow (Moir Leslie) a fashion designer who was once engaged to David and once involved much of Ambridge in her fashion shows. A few years later, the same actress played the vicar, Janet Fisher, but after Fisher had in turn been written out, Barlow herself reappeared in August 2006. She flirted with David and made a play to have an affair with him, having been resistant to intimacy before. When the reality of her flirting dawned on the naïf David he backed away and Barlow returned to London. David's wife Ruth had meanwhile in exasperation at David's apparent affair fallen in love with the farm's contractor Sam.

Colonel Freddy Danby (Norman Shelley and Ballard Berkeley) lodged with Laura Archer at Ambridge Hall. A widower, he always wanted to marry her, but it was not to be. When she died, her property was left to a New Zealand relative, and the colonel was cut out. He eventually left the village to live with an old Army friend in Bristol.

Siobhan Donovan (formerly Hathaway, Caroline Lennon) moved into Honeysuckle Cottage in 1999 with her husband, new local doctor Tim Hathaway. Their marriage came under strain when Siobhan miscarried a much-wanted baby and Tim became close to Ambridge's vicar Janet Fisher. It collapsed completely after Tim discovered Siobhan's affair with Brian Aldridge. On 14 November 2002, Siobhan gave birth to Brian's child Ruairí, but she moved to Germany after Brian refused to leave Jennifer. Siobhan made occasional appearances in The Archers when Brian made clandestine visits to Germany to see his son, while supposedly on business trips to Hungary. Siobhan's revelation in 2007 that she had terminal cancer, and her request that Brian care for Ruairí after her death, brought another crisis to Brian and Jennifer's relationship; Jennifer eventually agreed to Brian's request for them to raise Ruairí together. Siobhan died from cancer on 31 May 2007 and Ruairí came to Ambridge to live with his father, although much of his care fell, not without a struggle, on his father's wife, Jennifer. The circumstances of Ruairí's arrival briefly engulfed the village in gossip and, for some, scandal. In 2020 Caroline Lennon played the part again, to record a message Siobhan had left on a CD for Ruairi to hear on his 18th birthday.

Carl (Nicholas Bailey) was Amy Franks's ex-boyfriend. When Amy asked Carl about moving into together, he broke up with her. Amy later learnt that Carl was married, and a rift developed between her and Usha after it emerged that Usha had already known this. Eventually, Amy attempted to get Carl back, but he cruelly brushed her off.

Iftikar Shah (Pal Aron) is a maths teacher, who runs cricket coaching sessions for Ambridge residents. Believed to be 29 years old and born in Stechford, Birmingham.

=== Recurring villagers ===
Janet Fisher (Moir Leslie), the former vicar of Ambridge and surrounding villages, was a close friend of Shula Archer. Ambridge was one of the first parishes to have a female incumbent. Janet's time as vicar led the conservative Peggy Woolley to attend services at All Saints' in Borchester until she left the parish. When Janet left, Peggy returned to St. Stephen's. While Janet was vicar, Peggy complimented her on the tasteful way she handled services, but she still attended services in Borchester.

Jethro Larkin (George Hart), Stereotypical yokel. His tenure came to an end in 1987 when helping David fell a tree using a chainsaw. So two Larkin family members, Jethro and Bob, have met their end at the hands of members of the Archer family (see under Tom Forrest). Father of Clarrie.

Ned Larkin Bill Payne) Ned, father of Jethro, was a farmhand at Brookfield, and a friend of Walter Gabriel.

Zebedee Tring (Graham Rigby) was a roadman and friend of Jethro Larkin's dad, Ned. In 2013, a wealthy American descendant of his made contact with the vicarage enquiring about his ancestor Zebedee, and subsequently made a large donation towards the repair of the village organ.

Annette Turner (born September 1990) (Anne-Marie Piazza) Teenage daughter of the late Greg Turner. Had been living in France with her mother Michelle and sister Sonia, but after family upheavals returned to England to seek out Helen Archer. In February 2010 she suddenly disappeared from the series to stay with a grandmother in Sheffield. It was Annette's pregnancy (by Helen's boyfriend Leon, though this was never revealed to Helen) and subsequent termination, that precipitated Helen's decision, at thirty, to have a baby by donor insemination.

Martha Woodford (Mollie Harris) Shopkeeper, wife of Joby.

Sean Myerson (Gareth Armstrong) Landlord of the former pub The Cat and Fiddle.

Amy Franks (born 1989) (Jennifer Daley, formerly played by Vinette Robinson and Natalia Cappuccini) is the vicar's spirited daughter who is a friend to Alice Carter. Catherine, her late mother, was of African-Caribbean descent. Amy qualified as a midwife in Manchester and then worked at Borchester General Hospital. She was responsible for spotting the signs of pre-eclampsia in the pregnant Helen Archer and probably saving the life of mother and unborn son, Henry. She had a relationship with Carl, a man who seemed too good to be true. He was, having concealed his marriage from her and wanting only a fling. Usha, her stepmother, discovered that Carl was married but failed to warn her about him, which caused a serious rift between them and to a lesser degree between Amy and her father. After finally realising the degree to which Carl had abused her trust things seem to be improving at home. She eventually moved to be closer to her work but in 2021 returned to Ambridge after giving up her job as a midwife. She had a brief fling with Chris Carter when supporting his wife Alice with her recovery from alcoholism.

=== Villains and rogues ===
Matt Crawford (born 7 August 1947) (Kim Durham) He threw his weight around and become more hated by all. He was for some years the chairman of Borchester Land, a property development company. An outsider by birth, Matt often inveigled himself into positions of power, such as the parish council, but many villagers were suspicious of his motives. For example, when local vet Alistair owed him a gambling debt, Matt said that he would reduce the amount he owed in exchange for the administration of performance-enhancing drugs to one of his racehorses. Alistair refused, and Crawford increased the pressure, forcing Alistair and Shula to take out a mortgage on the stables, which they already owned. Many years later this caused a rift between Alistair and his by then business partner Anisha Patel. In 2005, Matt divorced his wife Yvette and moved in with his new partner Lilian Bellamy (née Archer, daughter of Peggy Woolley). In this romance she calls him "Tiger" and he calls her "Pussy-cat". In early 2008, Crawford and Lilian were briefly separated when she suspected him of having an affair with a Borchester Land board member, Annabelle Scrivener (Julia Hills). The following year Crawford was indicted for fraud, having made a business guarantee he knew was false. He was persuaded to co-operate with the authorities (in contrast with his less scrupulous colleague Stephen "Chalkie" Chalkman), but on practically the eve of the trial he fled in panic to Costa Rica, planning to live there as a fugitive. However, Lilian's unhappiness in prospective exile persuaded him to return, and he served an 18-month prison sentence. Upon his release on probation he created a new property development company, created with Lilian as director to circumvent his disqualification. Lilian took a more active role than he expected, which caused some friction. Matt and Lilian's relationship came to an end in 2015. Subsequent to Lilian having a brief affair with Matt's estranged brother Paul, (which she did not find out Matt knew about until later), Lilian arrived home from a holiday to discover that he had emptied out all of their joint holdings, ransacked their house of valuables and fled to Costa Rica. In April 2017, Matt made a surprise re-appearance, claiming to have returned to Ambridge in order to repay his debt to Lilian.

Tim Beecham (Tim Brierley and David Parfitt), an old friend of Nigel Pargetter. Once well known for persistently failing his law exams. Nigel and Shula found themselves in court in 1984 for taking a car they erroneously believed to be Beecham's. Now a silent and seldom-mentioned character. In April 2017, he attended Elizabeth Pargetter's 50th birthday party, but wasn't heard to speak.

Cameron Fraser (Delaval Astley) came to Ambridge in 1990 when he bought the Berrow Estate from Lilian Bellamy. He became quite the local villain during his relatively brief tenure: Mike Tucker lost an eye in an accident, Caroline Bone (later Sterling) and Marjorie Antrobus were swindled out of a sizeable portion of their savings, and a pregnant Elizabeth Archer was abandoned at a motor service station as he fled overseas to escape arrest. He had also attempted to rape Shula Archer.

Simon Pemberton (Peter Wingfield), Guy Pemberton's caddish son, inherited the estate after his father's death. Pemberton unsuccessfully attempted to end the Grundy's tenancy of Grange Farm following their farm fire in 1996. He had a brief relationship with Shula after Mark's death, but hit her after she confronted him with evidence that he was involved with another woman. Subsequently, he came close to having a relationship with Debbie Aldridge, but Pemberton assaulted her after she confessed that she could not love him. Pemberton then quickly left Ambridge after denying responsibility for his actions to Brian.

Rob Titchener (Timothy Watson) moved to Ambridge in January 2013 to manage Borchester Land's intensive dairy enterprise. That same July, Helen Archer began an affair with him despite knowing he was married. Only 3 months later and despite passionate pleas from Helen, he ended it to "make a go of things" with his wife, Jess (Rina Mahoney). Jess moved in on Halloween but left Ambridge in December after a disastrous cocktail party and went back to Hampshire, leaving Rob. Helen resumed her affair with Rob on New Year's Day 2014. During their engagement Jess had a baby, which she claimed was Rob's until he consented to a DNA test, which proved otherwise, and they were soon divorced. Rob and Helen married secretly on the Isle of Wight in August 2015. It was then that Rob revealed himself to be manipulative, controlling and emotionally abusive. Over the next few months he isolated Helen from her family and friends, employing gaslighting methods to persuade her that she was the one who was being problematic, and even made plans to send Henry to boarding school without Helen's knowledge or consent, with the assistance of his mother, Ursula (played by Carolyn Jones), herself a victim of coercive control at the hands of Rob's father, Bruce (Michael Byrne). In April 2016, following the secret intervention of her friend Kirsty Miller, Helen secretly met Jess, who revealed the true nature of her marriage with Rob. Helen then, in a moment of clarity, stabbed Rob after he placed a knife in her hand and goaded her to commit suicide, having refused to let her and Henry leave the house. Rob barely survived the encounter. Subsequently, Rob and his mother tricked Pat and Tony into handing Henry over to them, forcing them into a lengthy legal battle over custody. Following a long and intense trial, during which the truth of Rob's abusive nature was exposed publicly, as well as the revelation that he had raped Helen, she was acquitted on both counts of attempted murder and grievous bodily harm. Subsequently, Rob found himself becoming a pariah in the village, with Usha evicting him from the house he rented from her, Oliver banning him from the hunt, local shops refusing his custom and villagers openly expressing their distaste for him. It was also revealed shortly afterwards that the previous year, while still manager of the mega-dairy, Rob had blocked a nearby culvert to prevent a build-up of rainwater from flooding the dairy and was therefore responsible for the massive flood that had engulfed Ambridge and nearly caused the death of his boss. After this information was brought to the attention of Rob's new boss, Justin Elliott, he was sacked. Following an attempt to kidnap his son from Helen failed, Rob disappeared, and was reported boarding a flight to Minneapolis, Minnesota, where he had previously worked. In mid-2023 he reappeared in Ambridge, apparently intent on obtaining access to Jack, but was revealed to have a terminal illness, and died in the winter of that year.

== Silent characters ==
The Archers is known for its silent characters, who often play important roles in the narrative despite not being played by actors. They are numerous, and most only "appear" once or twice. Some of the better known are:

Baggy, Fat Paul, and Terry Two Phones — disreputable friends of Eddie Grundy. Terry's wife confiscated one of his phones in May 2023. Snatch Foster was formerly also a friend of Eddie Grundy, but ended up in prison for selling condemned meat to him.

Bailey, or Baillie — spelling uncertain, Ian's second-in-command in the Grey Gables kitchen. Their gender was not specified for some considerable time, but definitely referred to as 'he' by Oliver Sterling in the Xmas Eve episode.

Barry, barman at The Bull, given to popping crisp packets during slow shifts, and sporting a 'manbun' among other remarkable fashion statements.

Bob Pullen — nonagenarian resident of Manorfield Close. His weak bladder was a regular source of amusement to speaking characters. Mr. Pullen died in late 2012.

Derek Fletcher — "incomer" (only been in Ambridge since 1979) who lives on the Glebelands housing development. A former chair of the parish council, he is known for his 'NIMBY' views and collection of garden gnomes. In a standing joke, he is often described as excessively talkative (which is ironic, given his status as a silent character).

Edgar Titcombe — head gardener at Lower Loxley, who is married to the widowed Mrs Pugsley. Noted for always wearing a battered hat. Known universally as simply 'Titcombe'.

Eileen Titcombe (formerly Pugsley) — housekeeper at Lower Loxley. Known for many years as just 'Mrs Pugsley' until her marriage to Titcombe.

Freda Fry — wife of Bert Fry. Her cooking at The Bull was widely admired. Until she gave her notice in January 2007 she worked as a cleaner at Brookfield. She died of pneumonia in the wake of the ‘Great Ambridge Flood’ of 2015.

Jean Harvey — appeared in the 2015 Christmas production of Calendar Girls broadcast on Sunday 27 December 2015 at 7.15pm (played by Siân Phillips but was never heard on The Archers itself). She lives at Bull Farm.

Peter — Partner of Sean Myerson, who was the landlord of the Cat and Fiddle pub.

Jessica — buxom falconer at Lower Loxley. Was known to have attracted Nigel Pargetter's eye.

(John) Higgs — Jack Woolley's chauffeur and handyman at Grey Gables. Often thought by Grey Gables staff to be rather sinister.

Mandy Beesborough — Brian missed his daughter Alice's birth because he was at the races with her. She has daughters, including India, whom Oliver and Caroline's foster child Carly described as having "an arse the size of a continent".

Neville Booth (bellringer) and his nephew Nathan (clear skies enthusiast and parish council candidate).

Sabrina and Richard Thwaite — Residents of the salubrious Grange Spinney. Richard, a commuting accountant, rarely gets a mention beyond his involvement in the cricket team. Sabrina's somewhat extreme competitive streak, especially (though by no means exclusively) when it comes to sporting activities, gets her featured at least twice a month. Often discussed in male only company due to her 'physical attributes'. In December 2010 Sabrina was heard when she played the part of the cat in the village pantomime Dick Whittington - however she was only heard to make cat noises and didn't have any lines.

Shane — did the cooking at Nelson's wine bar in the 1980s. He was famed for his legendary quiche. Virtually silent: he once called out 'Yoo-hoo'.

Trudy Porter — silent for 34 years until 4 April 2006, when listener Christine Hunt played her in a charity special after her husband paid £17,000 to Children in Need.

Tilly and Molly Button — Sisters of indeterminate age (Molly, the older of the two, was eight years old in the episode broadcast 12 April 2009, but had already turned ten by 1 April of the following year), who in recent times seem to have supplanted the Horrobins as the village malefactors. However their misdeeds tend toward relatively harmless mischief-making rather than criminal activity (although on one occasion they committed criminal damage by vandalizing Rob Titchener's car and it was eventually established that they were the 'bunting thieves'). Molly Button has a degree of terpsichorean talent and is often mentioned in the context of village performances.

== Animals ==
Numerous animals have been repeatedly referred to during The Archers' run – usually played by the special effects department as necessary:

- Bartleby Joe Grundy's pony pulled his trap around the area. He Liked carrots and oats. He was put down on the 1st of October 2025.
- Bess Brookfield sheepdog being trained by Ben.
- Bill and Ben Two kittens given by Joe to Peggy. Bill has died, and Ben was run over by Brian Aldridge.
- Captain Jack Woolley's Staffordshire Bull Terrier dog was a frequent nuisance to guests and staff at Grey Gables, and was regularly indulged by his owner. Captain died suddenly while Jack was on his honeymoon with Peggy.
- Champion Martha Carter's pony.
- Chandler Alice Carter (née Aldridge)'s horse.
- Clint a turkey destined for the Christmas table in 1989 until given a reprieve by a young William Grundy.
- Constanza, Wolfgang and Salieri Lynda Snell's beloved llamas; Wolfgang died.
- Casper Freddy Pargetter's pony.
- Comet Helen Archer's pony, which almost died of colic.
- Eccles the peacock at the Bull. Died when hit by Kenton in his car.
- Hilda Ogden Donated to Peggy by her hairdresser; the "cat from hell" named after the Coronation Street character.
- Jip Will Grundy's dog shot by his brother Ed. Ed claimed it was an accident, Will believed it was murder.
- Lone Ranger Freda Fry's stray cat who died in 2007 from a bite feared to have been from an escaped snake. This led to stories of The Worm of Ambridge, a legendary monster, resurfacing — thanks to Joe Grundy's fertile imagination.
- Midnight the horse loved by Grace Archer, who died trying to save Midnight from a fire in the stables.
- Monty Lynda and Robert's dog.
- Otto a bull who attacked and seriously injured Tony Archer in 2014.
- Pensioner Lilian's horse when she lived at The Bull with her parents, Jack and Peggy Archer.
- Ruby mischievous birthday present from Matt to Lilian.
- Sammy Peggy Woolley's cat was always finding himself in scrapes and being indulged by his owner until he spent the last of his nine lives.
- Spearmint Alice Carter (née Aldridge)'s pony.
- Scruff Lynda Snell's dog. Went missing after the Ambridge flood of 2015 but found alive and well at Christmas in 2015 by Lynda. Died peacefully on Lynda's Resurgam stone on 31 July 2016.
- Timus a Corgi, present from Walter and Bill Sawyer to Phil after Grace's death.
- Topper Nigel Pargetter's horse, after Nigel's death sold to Shula. Died of liver failure July 2018.
- Tortoise Kenton and Jolene’s cat.
- Weaver Stella's dog, a greyhound adopted after having been found abandoned at the vet practice. Chased a hare and was accidentally crushed by Ed Grundy beneath the wheels of his trailer, and had to be euthanised.
- Webster Jazzer McCreary's tarantula.
