= Ursula O'Leary =

English actress

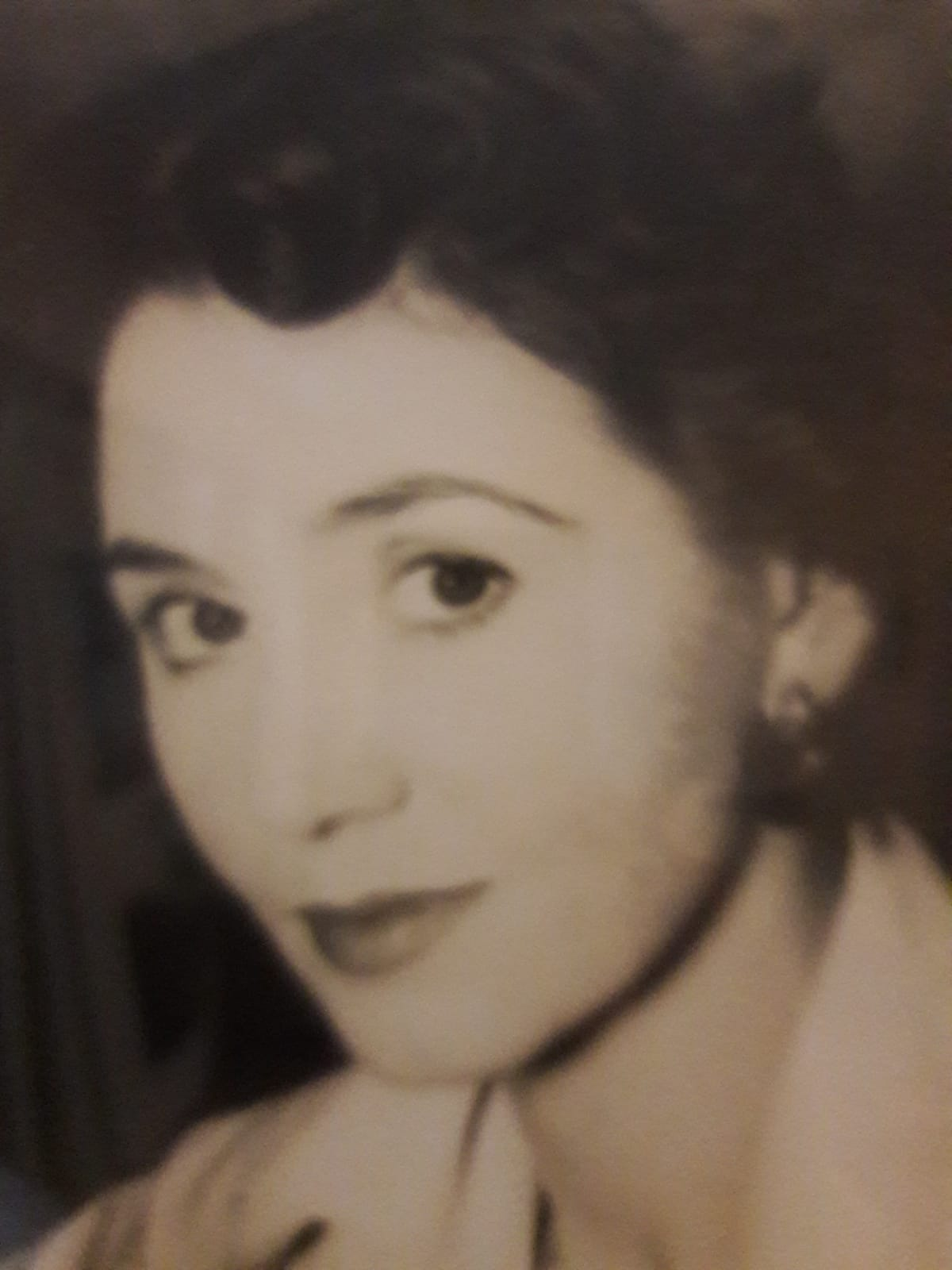
Ursula O'Leary

Ursula O'Leary (Birmingham, 10 March 1926 – 17 May 1993) was an English stage, radio and television actor. O'Leary graduated in stage management from the Royal Academy of Dramatic Arts (RADA) in 1948. Her stage performances were broadcast live nationwide; on radio she played siren art teacher Jane Petrie in The Archers. She appeared in a 1948 production of Twelfth Night alongside Patricia Neal and Robert Shaw, and later played Procula in a 1960 BBC radio broadcast of John Masefield's Good Friday.

== Stage management ==
In 1948, while still a student, O'Leary starred as Viola/Cesario in Twelfth Night directed by Robert Atkins sharing the stage with Patricia Neal, Robert Shaw, Peter Sallis and John Neville. Michael Barry, Head of Drama at BBC Television, adapted the performance for broadcast on 21 March 1948 as Scenes from Twelfth Night and Macbeth. The scenes were transmitted live for BBC Television at a time unrecorded other than still photography.

== Theatre ==
Having graduated in 1948, O'Leary's was performing in Richard Brinsley Sheridan's The Rivals at Nottingham Playhouse in 1949. In January 1950, O'Leary was appearing as Kate in André van Gyseghem's The Taming of the Shrew. Extracts were broadcast on BBC Radio on 2 February 1950. She played Thea Elvsted that same year in Ibsen's Hedda Gabler. In 1951 her plays included W. Somerset Maugham's Home and Beauty and A Murder Has Been Arranged also at Nottingham.

In 1954 O'Leary participated in a long repertoire of plays at the Grand Theatre, Wolverhampton: Affairs of State; The Letter; Birthday Honours; Friendly Relations; The Orchard Walls; The Gay Dog; Someone Waiting; Jane Steps Out; The Constant Wife; The Happy Marriage; The Trial of Mary Dugan; Are You a Mason?; Meet Mr Callaghan; The Love of Four Colonels; The Bad Samaritan; Two of Everything; The Cocktail Party; The First Year; For Better, for Worse; Affairs of State; and The Dancing Years.

By 1955 O'Leary was at Gate Theatre, Dublin, performing as Frida in Luigi Pirandello's The Masquerade of Henry IV O'Leary's performances at the Alexandra Theatre, Birmingham included The Cat and the Canary (1955); and the 1956 Running Wild

In July 1957 she married, at the time declaring her intention to focus on homemaking. O'Leary agreed to return to the Alexandra for the occasional play and, in July 1957, portrayed the absent-minded theatricality of retired star actress, Judith Bliss, in Noel Coward's Hay Fever. In 1959, she appeared in See How They Run and played the lead in Edmund Morris's The Wooden Dish.

== Television ==
1956 saw O'Leary appear as Karen Holt in the BBC's Story Conference beside TV debutant, Leonard Rossiter. She performed pantomime as the fairy Godmother at Alexandra Theatre in January 1956 reprising the role for the Wolverhampton Grand 1956/57 production of Cinderella.

O'Leary became best known on television for the role of Mary the anxious wife of manager, Gerry Barford (David Lodge), in the 1960s BBC soap opera, United!.

== Radio ==
On 14 April 1960 the BBC broadcast John Masefield's play in verse, Good Friday. O'Leary performed Procula, wife of Pontius Pilate (William Devlin), to the atmospheric sound effects of the BBC Radiophonic Workshop. The Home Service of Hugh Stewart's production used soundware such as the EMS Synthi 100 and ARP Odyssey l. In 1974 Olivia Manning adapted a further two of Arnold Bennett's works (The Card and The Regent) into an eight part BBC Radio play: Denry - The Adventures Of A Card. Graham Armitage portrayed the eponymous Denry with O'Leary as the beautiful Countess of Chell.

In 1970 she played Janet Onslow in Death in the Family for the Midweek Theatre slot on BBC Radio 4. Other appearances included the BBC Radio Four adaption of Bennett's Buried Alive on 11 March 1972.

In 1972 O'Leary's character was Jane Petrie, an attractive young art teacher from the fictional Borchester. Her distractions while running the summer school at Arkwright Hall gets Tony Archer (Colin Skipp) the sack from Ralph Bellamy's dairy enterprise.

== Legacy ==
O'Leary married doctor Donal O'Donovan. They had three children Kate, Rosaleen and Daniel. Ursula O'Leary died unexpectedly on 17 May 1993 and her ashes were interred at Brandwood End Cemetery. Much of O'Leary's work no longer exists in the BBC archives.
