= Ruth Archer =

Fictional character in The Archers

- The Archers character
- Felicity Finch as Ruth
- Portrayed by: Felicity Finch
- Duration: 1987–present
- First appearance: 15 July 1987
- Introduced by: Liz Rigbey
In-universe information
- Occupation: Farmer
- Father: Solly Pritchard
- Mother: Heather Pritchard
- Husband: David Archer (1988–present)
- Sons: Josh Archer; Ben Archer
- Daughters: Pip Archer
- Granddaughters: Rosie Archer

Ruth Archer (also Pritchard) is a fictional character from the British BBC Radio 4 soap opera The Archers, played by English actress Felicity Finch. She made her debut in the 15 July 1987 episode. The character was created and introduced to The Archers as a love interest for established character David Archer (Timothy Bentinck), whose then girlfriend was deemed unsuitable for the role of mother to the next generation of the Archer family by the editor of the show Liz Rigbey. Finch was cast as Ruth after a successful audition.

Ruth is portrayed as being strong-willed, determined and loyal. She is also a New Woman and a farmer, traits that made her stand out from the other female characters in The Archers at the time of her introduction. In later years, Ruth has mellowed and is more open to negotiation. Her storylines have often revolved around her marriage to David and her work on Brookfield Farm. In the early 2000s, the scriptwriters had Ruth and David isolate themselves from the community during a foot-and-mouth outbreak. Ruth was also diagnosed with breast cancer, a storyline which Finch undertook extensive research for and later named as one of her Archers highlights.

The show's 15,000th episode focused on Ruth contemplating whether to consummate her affair with herdsman Sam Batton (Robin Pirongs), after believing David was having his own affair with his ex-girlfriend Sophie Barlow (Moir Leslie). Ruth ultimately chose to return home to her family. The storyline, which had begun in 2004, was heavily criticised by listeners, who inundated the BBC with complaints. Low listener figures were also attributed to the storyline, while the editor Vanessa Whitburn said the backlash helped keep Ruth faithful to David.

Critical opinion on the character differs. She has been described as a "much-loved character" and a "cheery supermum-farmer", but has also been called the "most irritating" Ambridge resident and she is disliked by some listeners for being a Geordie. Other listeners hoped Ruth would be killed off during the show's 60th anniversary celebrations. Away from The Archers, the character has appeared in the Rwandan radio soap Urunana, the BBC telethon Children in Need and has been frequently parodied on the comedy programme Dead Ringers.

== Creation and casting ==
When Liz Rigbey was appointed editor of The Archers in 1986, she began implementing several changes in a bid to revitalise the show which had become tired. Rigbey brought in new writers, retired some characters and introduced new ones. In his 1996 book, The Archers: The True Story, Rigbey's predecessor William Smethurst explained that she had "wisely" decided that David Archer's (Timothy Bentinck) fashion designer girlfriend, Sophie Barlow (Moir Leslie), was not suitable for the role of matriarch to the next generation of the Archer family. During the script meeting to invent David's new love interest, the writers played with the idea of making the character Scottish and calling her either Anne, Heather or Thistle to show off her spiky nature.

Rigbey also wanted to make sure that everyone liked the character, and eventually nineteen year old, agricultural student Ruth Pritchard was created. Actress (later presenter) Felicity Finch was cast as Ruth. Finch had not listened to The Archers prior to her audition in 1987 and she tried to learn as much as she could about the history of the show before she came to the studio. Smethurst thought the decision to cast a Geordie was "odd" and wrote that it harked back to the days when the show would cast many Scottish and Irish actors, irritating the audience. Finch's first scenes as Ruth were broadcast on 15 July 1987.

== Development ==
=== Characterisation ===
In her fictional backstory, Ruth was born on 16 June 1968 to Solly (Richard Griffiths) and Heather Pritchard (Joyce Gibbs; Margaret Jackman). She was raised in Prudhoe, Northumberland. Ruth worked on an Israeli kibbutz for a year, prior to her acceptance onto an agricultural course at Harper Adams University College. She then applied for a year's work experience at Brookfield Farm and she was hired by Phil Archer (Norman Painting). Smethurst wrote that Ruth stood out among many of the other female characters at the time of her introduction, as she was a New Woman, a feminist and a farmer. Her favourite style is a pair of jeans and a T-shirt. Upon her arrival in Ambridge, Ruth felt like an outsider. This was not helped by David's attitude towards her being an unskilled woman and her landlady's nosy demeanour. Ruth's "dedication and willingness" eventually won David round and he came to appreciate her.

Speaking to the BBC, Finch said Ruth "is strong willed, determined and pretty direct in her approach to life and people in general." Finch explained having breast cancer mellowed Ruth and instead of fighting her corner, she is quite likely to negotiate instead. Finch added her character appreciates life day to day. Robert Hanks writing for The Independent described Ruth as The Archers' "matriarch-in-waiting" and said she is "a family lynchpin – loyal wife, loving mother, and handy in the milking-shed when called on." Simon Frith and Chris Arnot, authors of The Archers Archives, opined Ruth is not a stereotypical farmer's wife. They said "Ruth is more likely to have her hand in a rubber glove rather than an oven glove – thrust up the back end of a Friesian rather than delving into an Aga and emerging with something wholesome for supper."

=== Marriage to David Archer ===
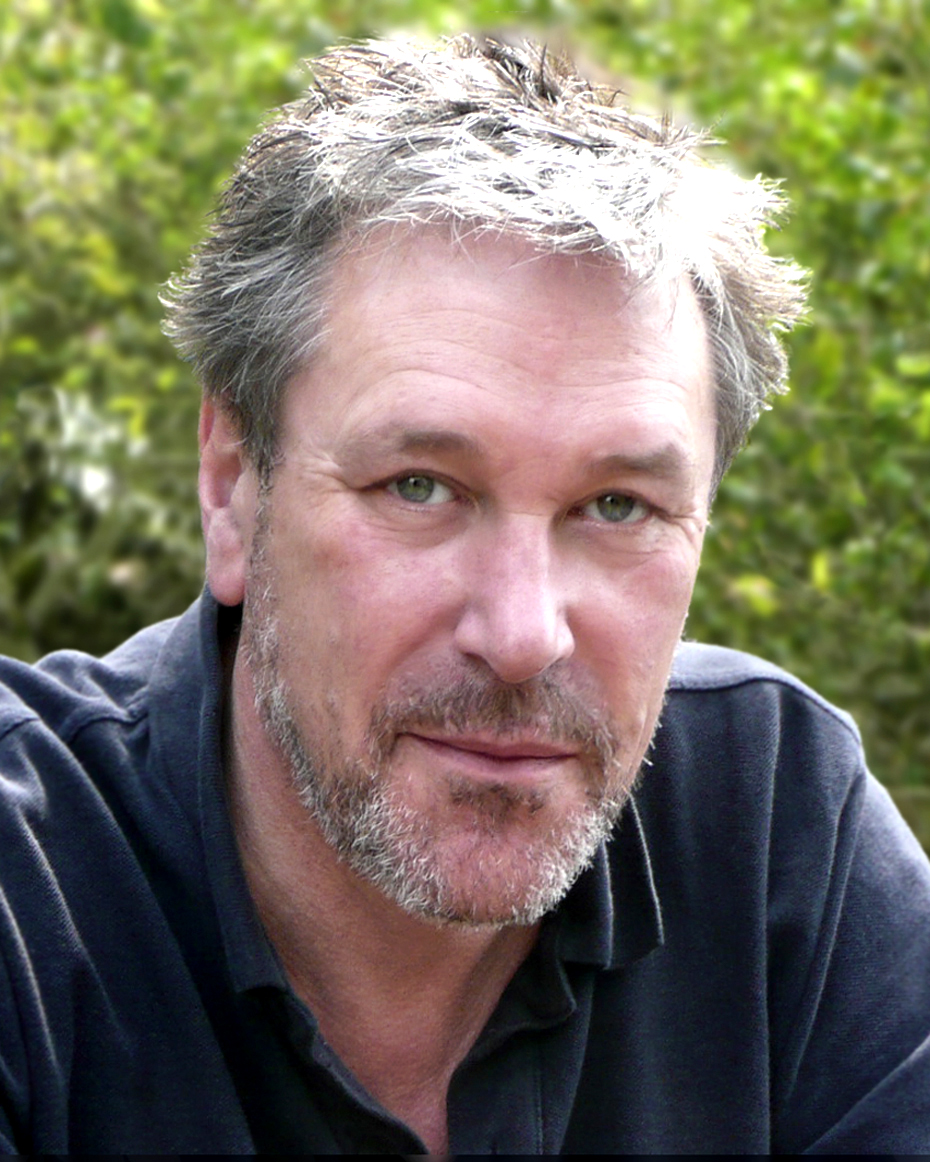
Ruth is married to David Archer, played by Timothy Bentinck (pictured).

Ruth's marriage to David is central to her character. Finch explained that it took Ruth a while to see that there were good qualities in David, as his initial behaviour towards her was unpleasant. Finch called David "a sexist pig" and said he resented Ruth's presence almost immediately. However, Ruth had noticed his ruggedness and she was attracted to the way he helped the sickly animals. After David noticed his brother flirting with Ruth, he realised that he loved her and told her about his feelings. Despite getting off to a bad start, Ruth and David began dating and were married towards the end of 1988. Finch thought Ruth and David had "a really believable partnership" and were well-suited, saying "They are both very capable of becoming highly emotional if something riles them but thankfully they tend to react to different things. So, often one will be able to calm, soothe and support the other through most crises. Or at least provide some kind of balance to a problem." The actress added that Ruth and David are the best of friends.

Ruth continued with her studies at Harper Adams and she and David eventually established "a good working relationship". Ruth was given the responsibility of looking after the dairy herd, before becoming a partner in the farm. Ruth and David's first child, Philippa Rose, or Pip (Helen Monks; Daisy Badger), was born in February 1993. Joanna Toye and Adrian Flynn, authors of The Archers Encyclopaedia, said Ruth took to motherhood well and did not let it stop her from playing an active part in Brookfield. The couple's second child, Joshua (Cian Cheesbrough; Angus Imrie), was born in 1997. Ruth and David later purchased some Hereford cattle and began to establish themselves as suppliers of traditional beef. Toye and Flynn observed that Ruth and David's marriage had to be strong when the Archer siblings began arguing over who would inherit Brookfield Farm. Ruth told David that "time was too precious to spend in argument" and suggested they moved away. However, David's father, Phil, decided that the farm should go to the couple.

In 2012, the couple were faced with a campaign of intimidation, after David witnessed an assault on Adam Macy (Andrew Wincott). Ruth was "unnerved" when the silent phone calls began and she sent the children to stay with her mother. The intimidation ended after a barn at Brookfield was set alight and the arsonist was caught, following an anonymous tip off. In 2013, Ruth and David celebrated their 25th wedding anniversary and Finch hoped the couple would continue to make Brookfield a thriving business, while relaxing into semi-retirement. Finch commented, "Any couple who after 25 years still love going out for meals together, having the occasional break away without the kids and the odd roll in a haystack are doing pretty well I reckon." The following year, Ruth discovered that, at 45, she was expecting her fourth child. However, the pregnancy ended in a miscarriage.

=== Breast cancer ===
In 2000, the character was diagnosed with breast cancer. After discovering a lump in her breast in May, Ruth was checked out by her general practitioner, Tim Hathaway (Jay Villiers). The following month Ruth was told that she had breast cancer and that as it was multi-focal, she would need a mastectomy followed by a course of chemotherapy. Ruth was thirty-four at the time of her diagnosis, which was unusually young to contract such a cancer. Breast cancer nurse Vickki Harmer acted as a consultant to the scriptwriters during the storyline and BBC Radio 4 invited listeners to ring a helpline for further advice after Ruth received her diagnosis. Finch contacted the breast cancer charity, Breakthrough, when she learnt about her character's new story and she spoke extensively about the research she did and the effect of the diagnosis on her character:

Everyone I talked to seemed to have a relative or a friend who'd been through it. That was the other thing – everyone reacts to the problem differently so there's no textbook way of playing Ruth in her present situation. In fact, the way I'm playing her now might surprise some people because in the past she's been such a strong character and here she is collapsed and weeping and thinking the worst. Occasionally you may suggest to the script editor that you don't think your character will react a certain way, but with Ruth I have absolute trust in the scriptwriter's characterisation.

The storyline continued to play out over the following months as Ruth had her mastectomy operation, began a slow process of recovery and came to terms with her new appearance. When Ruth's chemotherapy treatment began during the Autumn months, David, Heather and close friend Usha (Souad Faress) were a constant source of support and comfort to her. Following her last course of chemotherapy, Ruth returned to work on the farm and was later given the all clear. In 2002, Ruth became pregnant and gave birth to her third child, Ben (Thomas Lester; Ben Norris).

Speaking to The Observer's Sue Arnold, Finch believed The Archers had done "a great service for women's health" by tackling the subject of breast cancer. Finch later revealed that she had received letters from listeners about the storyline and one woman wrote to thank her because she had found a lump in her breast after listening to the show. Finch also named the storyline as one of her Archers highlights. Delyth Morgan, chief executive of Breakthrough said The Archers treated the subject of breast cancer "as sensibly as one can reasonably expect." Morgan continues saying that Breakthrough liked how the show had highlighted the effect that a cancer diagnosis can have on a partner. In contrast, the radio series Feedback reported that the storyline had initially attracted a negative response from listeners, who felt the subject should have been handled with more optimism.

=== Foot-and-mouth outbreak ===
Shortly after inheriting Brookfield, Ruth and David were faced with a countrywide foot-and-mouth outbreak. They decided to isolate themselves from the community in a bid to stop the disease spreading onto their land and infecting their animals. Farmworker Bert Fry (Eric Allan) also came to live with the family in seclusion, so he could help out with the animals. Ruth and David became frustrated with the situation and Ruth also had trouble sleeping. The couple later sent Pip to live with relatives. Soap Opera author Dorothy Hobson wrote that it was a "drastic measure", but believed the storyline to be part of The Archers' continued commitment in responding to topical events. The show's then editor, Vanessa Whitburn, said that some storylines had to be put on hold in order for the cast and crew to weave in the foot-and-mouth outbreak into the show. Whitburn told Samantha Lyster from the Birmingham Post, "We decided that David and Ruth Archer should isolate themselves because they had just taken control of the farm and they had the most to lose should foot-and-mouth hit them." Whitburn later said she was "particularly proud" of the storyline and all the work that went into it. Finch commented that dealing with the constant re-writes was hard, but enjoyable work. The storyline was praised by farmers for its realistic portrayal.

=== Near affair with Sam Batton ===
After expanding the dairy herd in May 2004, David and Ruth hired specialist herdsman Sam Batton (Robin Pirongs). Ruth frequently came into contact with Sam around the farm and he confided in Ruth about his relationship with Kirsty Miller (Annabelle Dowler). Ruth found herself becoming jealous when Sam went on holiday with Kirsty. In their book, The Archers Archives, Simon Frith and Chris Arnot commented that the "simmering mix of sexual chemistry" between Ruth and Sam reached boiling point when David's ex-girlfriend, Sophie Barlow, returned to Ambridge and asked David to help organise a charity fashion show. Ruth became stressed and insecure about David spending time with his ex-girlfriend and she turned to Sam. The main reason for Ruth's insecurity was her image, as she had recently undergone a mastectomy and felt "dowdy" next to Sophie. Ruth became emotionally confused when Sam informed her that he had broken up with Kirsty. She then caught David lying about meeting up with Sophie and believed he was having an affair. Unbeknownst to Ruth, Sophie had tried to entice David into an affair, but he resisted her advances.

"We've crafted scenes over the past two years where they've enjoyed working alongside each other. Only very gradually have we revved up the emotional side. If this had been television, it would have been done and dusted much quicker."

— Editor Vanessa Whitburn on bringing Sam and Ruth together (2006)

Elisabeth Mahoney from The Guardian observed that Ruth and David's marriage imploded while Sophie was around and she said the speed at which it happened made for genuinely shocking listening. Mahoney said "Felicity Finch and Tim Bentinck spat their toxic lines out with much relish, and for once emphatically shook off their characters' middle-of-the-road cosiness and golden couple status." After seeking Sam out for comfort, Ruth kissed him. When Sam declared his love for Ruth, she agreed to spend the night with him at a hotel in Oxford. Ruth told David she was meeting a friend for the night. Tim Teeman from The Times commented that the moment Ruth became stuck in traffic contrasted with "the scary new land she was travelling towards". Ruth's decision to spend the night with Sam was the focus of The Archers' 15,000th episode, which was broadcast on 7 November 2006. The episode was written by Joanna Toye, who told Emily Lambert of the Western Mail that the traffic jam was used to increase the tension.

Editor Vanessa Whitburn told Chris Arnot of The Independent that the climax to the storyline was planned three months prior to the show's anniversary. When Ruth listened to a voicemail from her daughter, it reminded her of home and she called Sam to say she could not be with him. Ruth then turned to Usha for support, before returning home to David, who observed Ruth's emotional state. After Sam quit his job, Ruth eventually told David the truth about what happened. Bentinck explained that when he and Finch finished recording the scene, they were both crying as it had been very distressing. David was initially unable to forgive Ruth for her actions, but after speaking to Usha and gaining some perspective, over time things between himself and Ruth became easier.

== Reception ==
Despite being popular with many, the character of Ruth has also gained much criticism over the years. In 2007, Karen Price from the Western Mail called Ruth a "much-loved character". The Scotsman's Fordyce Maxwell called Ruth "the archetype of common sense and forward planning". Victoria Summerley from The Independent noted the character was "instantly recognisable" because she is a Geordie and bemoaned the fact "poor inoffensive Ruth" was disliked by some of the more hardcore fans because of this. Nicholas Lezard from the same publication disliked Ruth, branding her "highly irritating". He later thought the scriptwriters had created in David and Ruth "the only couple in the Western Hemisphere who are delighted that their parents are coming for Christmas." Ruth and David were described by The Times critic, Tim Teeman, as "the series' golden couple — the future Phil and Jill". While The Herald's Anne Simpson said the couple were "the standing stones of Ambridge: rooted, solid, weathered by storms but unbeaten, a reassuring constant in our national life."

Ruth's mastectomy after breast cancer was named one of the most shocking storylines from The Archers by The Daily Telegraph's Nick Collins. Rachel Cooke of the New Statesman was not a fan of the character at all, writing "Ruth bores me to sobs, so I didn't give a fig that this was out of character." Lezard noted that Ruth had gone from "cheery supermum-farmer to lovelorn hysteric facing total loss".

Reaction to the near affair storyline from listeners was generally negative and Chris Hastings from The Daily Telegraph reported that the BBC had been inundated with complaints, saying the storyline was "utterly ridiculous", while others questioned its plausibility. Listeners started an online protest against the storyline following Whitburn's appearance on Feedback. The show's presenter Roger Bolton commented on the backlash saying fans thought the plot was "unbelievable and over-sensational." Other listeners thought Ruth and David had undergone personality transplants and accused the BBC of trying to turn The Archers into a radio version of EastEnders.

The official website had over 11,000 responses to a poll asking listeners whether Ruth should go with Sam, compared to the usual 3,000. Fifty-two per cent of the listeners thought Ruth should go to Sam. The Archers website had received 1.2 million page impressions due to the storyline in 2006. In February 2007, a writer for the Daily Record reported almost 200,000 listeners had deserted The Archers due to controversial storylines, such as Ruth and Sam's affair. The writer said figures for the last three months of 2006, when the Ruth and Sam storyline peaked, revealed 4.44 million listeners tuned in, which was down 169,000 on the previous quarter. Whitburn told Midgley that the backlash from listeners helped keep Ruth faithful to David, and agreed that she was not the type to have an affair.

The Spectator's Kate Chisholm was delighted that Ruth did not spend the night with Sam and believed that she "kept true to her blunt, honest character (and biblical name)." Chisholm also felt that as an outsider to Ambridge, Ruth had always been treated with "slight suspicion". Ian Sanderson, who runs Archers Anarchists, branded Ruth "ghastly" and "the Geordie gorgon", he also opined that she was "one of Ambridge's most irritating and frumpy residents." In 2011, a Belfast Telegraph reporter commented that Ruth had become an "unpopular figure" and listeners had wanted her to die during the 60th anniversary episode. Actor Graham Seed, whose character Nigel Pargetter was killed off during the anniversary, shared the same view, saying he would "do in" Ruth. When asked why, he replied "Well, she goes on a bit, doesn't she? 'Oooooh David!' and all that. I'd do old Ruthie in, or Tom Archer and his bloody sausages."

== In popular culture and other media ==
In 1999, Finch flew to Rwanda to help launch a new radio soap called Urunana, a programme which is aimed predominantly at women and focuses on health issues, child care and genocide within the country of Rwanda. A decade later, the makers of Urunana invited Finch to record a guest appearance as Ruth for the show. Ruth's scenes saw her married to a shopkeeper named Munyakazi, who was reluctant to let her train as a community health worker. Of the storyline, Finch said "Although all this seemed not a little bizarre for strong-willed, independent Ruth, when I cast my mind back, it wasn't a million miles away from David's (my Archers husband of more than 20 years) reaction to having a female student arrive to work alongside him at Brookfield in 1987."

On 18 November 2005, Finch and six of her co-stars appeared as their respective characters on the BBC's Children in Need broadcast, alongside presenter Terry Wogan. Ruth joined her husband, David, and friend, Lynda Snell (Carole Boyd), in one of three scenes written especially for the show. Ruth's renowned way of saying "ooooh nooooh" has been frequently parodied on the comedy programme Dead Ringers.
