= Vanessa Whitburn =

British radio producer

Vanessa Victoria Whitburn OBE (born 12 December 1951) is a British radio producer, and a former editor of The Archers.

== Early life ==
Whitburn was born in Totnes, Devon, the daughter of Victor Whitburn and Eileen Wellington. She has a younger brother (born 1954). She failed her 11-plus and her parents sent her to Mount St Mary's Convent School, Exeter, which closed in 1997.

She graduated from the University of Hull with a BA degree in English and American Studies in 1974. At university, she directed theatre productions, and took part in the university television station.

== Earlier career ==
She joined the BBC after university in 1974 as a trainee sound technician. From 1976 to 1977, she worked for BBC Television. From 1977, she worked as a producer in radio drama for the BBC, at their Radio Drama Unit, which produced the Afternoon Play. From 1977 to 1980, she was assistant producer of The Archers while William Smethurst was in charge of the programme. During this period she cast Trevor Harrison as Eddie Grundy and Sara Coward as Caroline Bone (later Pemberton and Stirling). "William Smethurst, recognised that I was good at directing and casting so he let me get on with that whilst he concentrated on storylines and scripts", she explained in 2010.

From 1988 to 1990, she was the producer of Channel 4's Brookside. According to Whitburn, she was with the programme for four years, during the period Jimmy McGovern was still a member of the scriptwriting team,

=== The Archers ===
She became the Editor of The Archers in June 1991. She became executive producer of all radio drama for BBC Birmingham at Pebble Mill Studios in 1995 (later based at The Mailbox), including Silver Street for the BBC Asian Network. Clashes between Whitburn and Smethurst (who had left the programme in 1986) became publicly known in 1996, with the former accusing Smethurst of "fluffy and frothy" Conservative propaganda, and the latter retaliating with the assertion that Whitburn had "no understanding of the countryside" and the serial under her had become "badly written feminist tripe". Smethurst wrote that then current plot lines simply did not happen in the countryside, although journalists pointed to real-life parallels. "Farming is, and will always be, central to the show. It’s our USP", she commented in 2010. "I drive in to work every day through the countryside and I’m always watching what the farmers are doing, and making sure we have covered that", she told Peter Stanford.

The programme in Whitburn's hands was periodically accused of being politically correct. The racial origin of the South African character Lucas Madakane (Connie M'Gadzah) was not directly mentioned when he was introduced around 2001, which Victoria Mather in The Daily Telegraph thought "bizarre in a gossipy rural community". Mark Lawson of The Guardian wrote that while any racism in the serial's fictional Ambridge "may be occurring out of earshot", treatment was also dramatically realistic because the issue of a person's skin colour is now seldom referred to directly in Britain. It was also accused of being too melodramatic. "We can’t win", Whitburn said in 2010. "If I do nothing, people say it’s too dull".

The 60th anniversary of the programme was billed as containing developments to "shake Ambridge to the core", which turned out to be long-term character Nigel Pargetter (Graham Seed) being killed in an accident.

Whitburn left her position as the Editor of The Archers at the end of May 2013 after 22 years. From 2011 to 2013, she was also Editor of Ambridge Extra. During the period Whitburn was Editor, The Archers had up to 5 million listeners. Her decision to formally retire from her roles was announced in March 2013.

== Personal life ==
Whitburn lives in Stratford-upon-Avon, and also shares a house in Cape Town, South Africa with her partner.

On Friday 11 February 1994, she had a car accident at 11.30am on Bristol Road near Pebble Mill on her way into work, in her white VW Golf. She was taken to the intensive care at Birmingham General Hospital. She spent 17 days in hospital, after fracturing her pelvis and sustaining other injuries; she returned to work in June 1994.

She was awarded the OBE in the 2014 New Year Honours.

== Publications ==
- The Archers: the official inside story, 1996

== See also ==
- List of The Archers characters
