= Mount St Mary's Convent School =

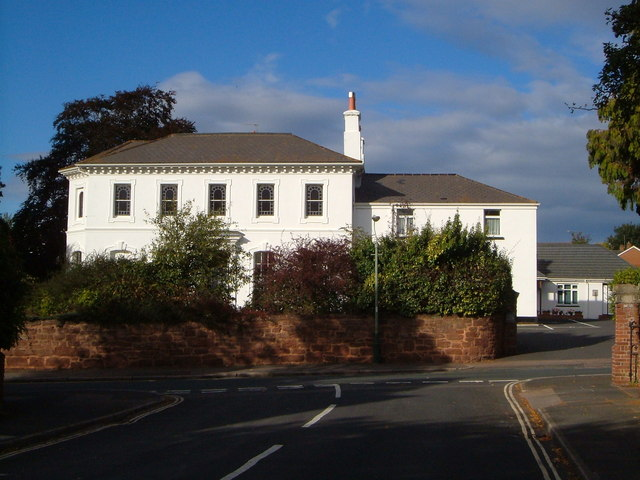

Location
- Wonford Road; Exeter, Devon, EX2 4PF; England

Information
- Type: Private day and boarding school
- Religious affiliation: Church of England
- Closed: 31 August 1997
- Gender: Girls
- Age: 2 to 19

Mount St Mary's Convent School was a private school for girls in Exeter, England. The building is Grade II* listed.

== History ==
Mount St Mary's closed on 31 August 1997 following the 1997 general election when it failed to re-open within the state sector under the new Labour leadership.

== Notable former pupils ==
- Vanessa Whitburn OBE (born 1951), British radio producer and former editor of The Archers
