= Good Friday: A Play in Verse =

1916 work by poet John Masefield

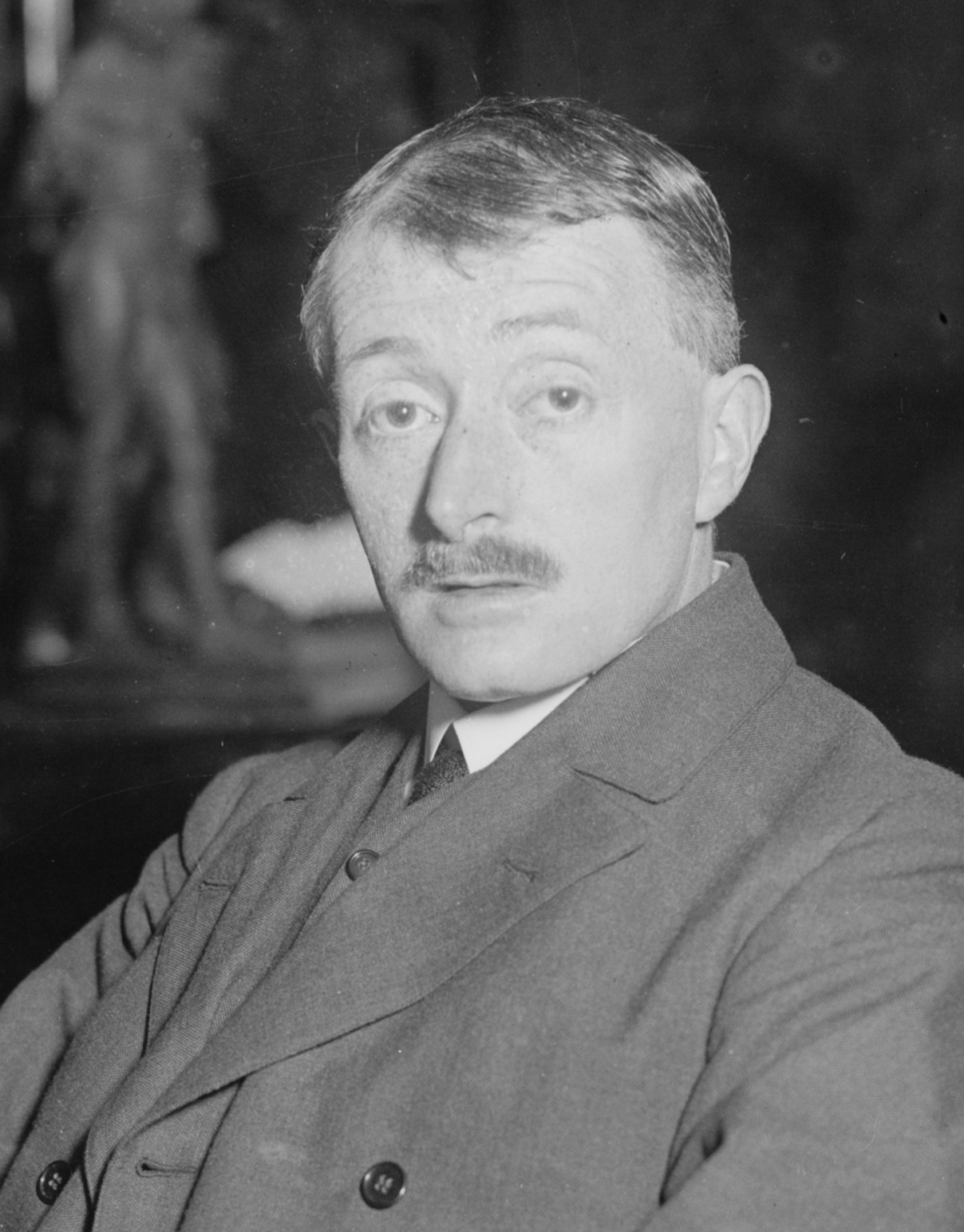
John Masefield in 1916

Good Friday: A Play in Verse is a 1914 work by English poet John Masefield, first published in The Fortnightly Review in December 1915. Good Friday and Other Poems was published in New York in 1916 by The Macmillan Company and 1917 Heinemann, London.

By 1913 Masefield was best known for his long narrative poem, Dauber, and the St James's Theatre was reviving his plays The Witch and Nan. Good Friday 1914, was on the eve of war. Following the 1916 publication, the poet Edmund Blunden recalled reading Good Friday in a frontline dugout in Richebourg-l'Avoué just as their sentry was killed by a sniper.

As to the success he achieves in attempting to deal with so tremendous a theme as that of his dramatic poem, Good Friday, there may well be a difference of opinion
- North American Review April 1916

Setting the scene following the crucifixion of Jesus in Good Friday, Masefield directs that Pilate should enter "as the darkness reddens to a glare."

A German translation of Good Friday, by Erich Fried, was broadcast on the BBC German Service in 1951. 14 April 1960 saw the broadcast of Hugh Stewart's Home Service production of Good Friday in which actors William Devlin and Ursula O'Leary, as Pontius Pilate and Procula, perform to the atmospheric sound effects of the BBC Radiophonic Workshop's soundware, such as the EMS Synthi 100 and ARP Odyssey l.
