= Sara Coward =

English actress and writer (1948–2017)

- Born: 30 January 1948; Eltham, London, England, UK
- Died: 12 February 2017 (aged 69); Warwickshire, England, UK
- Occupation: Actress
- Years active: 1972–2016
- Known for: Caroline Sterling in The Archers

Sara Coward (30 January 1948 – 12 February 2017) was an English actress and writer. She was known for her role as Caroline Sterling in the BBC Radio 4 soap opera The Archers.

== Early life and career ==
Coward was born and raised in Eltham, south-east London and attended the girls' grammar school in the area before reading English and Drama at Bristol University and then studied at the Guildhall School of Music and Drama. While she was performing the role of Lady Macbeth in repertory theatre, Vanessa Whitburn, a producer from The Archers saw her and offered her the role of Caroline Bone, as the character was originally known.

Coward first appeared in The Archers in 1977, and was a regular from 1979 until September 2016. She also appeared in the TV productions Inspector Morse, Hetty Wainthropp Investigates and Rumpole of the Bailey.

== Death ==
Coward was diagnosed with breast cancer in 2013. She underwent a mastectomy; however, a lump was found in her neck afterwards and she was further diagnosed with terminal cancer in 2016. During her last weeks, Coward launched a campaign named SM:)E ("smile") to encourage people to be friendly and kind to each other.

Sara Coward died on 12 February 2017 in a Warwickshire hospice, at the age of 69.

== Filmography ==
Year	Title	Role	Notes
1972	New Scotland Yard	Sandra Williams	Episode: "Ask No Questions"
1987	Inspector Morse	Lynn	Episode: "The Wolvercote Tongue"
1992	Rumpole of the Bailey	Elspeth Dodds	Episode: "Rumpole and the Reform of Joby Jonson"
1997	Hetty Wainthropp Investigates	Receptionist	Episode: "Daughter of the Regiment"
