= Pat Archer =

Fictional character from the British BBC Radio 4 soap opera

- The Archers character
- Portrayed by: Patricia Gallimore
- Duration: 1974–2019, 2021–present
- First appearance: 1974
- Created by: Tony Shryane
In-universe information
- Occupation: Farmer; Dairy entrepreneur
- Husband: Tony Archer (1974–present)
- Sons: John Archer; Tom Archer
- Daughters: Helen Archer
- Grandsons: Johnny Phillips; Henry Archer; Jack Archer
- Uncles: Haydn Evans

Pat Archer (also Lewis) is a fictional character from the British BBC Radio 4 soap opera, The Archers. The character was introduced in 1974 by producer Tony Shryane as the love interest of Tony Archer, whom she would later marry. Radio actress Patricia Gallimore has played the role for 45 years, making her one of the longest-serving soap opera actors in the world.

Pat is married to Tony Archer and mother of John, Helen and Tom. She is also the grandmother to Henry and Jack Archer. Pat has been involved in many crises over her almost five-decades in Ambridge, including an escherichia coli outbreak in the dairy, Tony being crushed by a bull and being a prosecution witness in her daughter Helen's attempted murder trial.

== Creation and casting ==
=== Characterisation ===
Before joining The Archers cast, Gallimore was starring in some of the BBC's most popular radio serials and dramas. Gallimore then moved across to The Archers in 1974, joining as newcomer Pat Lewis. Gallimore said in a 2015 interview her character had "mellowed a bit" from her days being "radical and free-thinking, supporting women's lib". "I like to think she's still got that fire and passion," Gallimore says. "These have helped her survive all the crises – the death of John, Pat’s mental health, Helen’s pregnancy… I think she’s great and I enjoy playing her. She can be maddening – but we all can." Gallimore describes the character as "hard-working, long-suffering, loyal; sometimes bossy".

== Development ==
=== Early years ===
Pat Lewis was born on January 10, 1952. She moved to Ambridge in 1974 to help with the cattle after her uncle Haydn Evans slipped a disc. Tony Archer (Colin Skipp) took a shine to Pat, and called off his engagement to Mary Weston. Later that year, Pat proposed and they were married by Christmas. In March 1978, the couple took over the tenancy of Bridge Farm after the departure of Mike Tucker, who left to replace Tony as Hadyn Evans' partner. Bridge Farm is about 140 acres and used to be one of several tenanted farms on the Berrow Estate. The couple originally started the farm with hens and a small dairy herd.

=== Political awakening ===
In 1982, Polly Perks was killed in a car accident between Pat's car and a milk tanker. Escaping serious injury, Pat experienced a political awakening. She enrolled as a supporter of the Campaign for Nuclear Disarmament and cancelled her husband's subscription to the Daily Express in favour of The Guardian. Her move to supporting progressive issues almost spelled the end of her marriage, when she became close with Women's Studies lecturer Roger Coombes. To save the marriage, Tony offered to turn the farm organic, something that provided them with a common cause and reunited them. The couple would hit many speed bumps but in 1988, their new dairy block opened and they were soon supplying butter and yoghurt to locals and fancy delicatessens in London. In 1992, they opened an op-farm shop, which closed six years later.

=== The death of son John ===
Pat's son John had developed a crush on Sharon Richards in the early 1990s. Sharon was renting a caravan on Bridge Farm. The couple's romance blossomed, and led to John leaving the family farm for Home Farm in 1994. Returning from a holiday, Pat found a pair of Sharon's underwear in her bed and after a row with John, he moved out. Sharon and John dated for a brief period, but the relationship ended soon after. John then began pursuing his brother Tom's girlfriend, Hayley. Angry at being rejected and having a fight with his father, John took off on his tractor, Fergie, and was discovered by Tony dead in a ditch. John's brother Tom dropped out of school to run his late brother's pig business and Pat took the loss incredibly hard.

=== Depression ===
Pat developed depression following John's death, which came to a head when she blamed Tony for the accident. Her new doctor, Tim Hathaway, prescribed her medication and counselling sessions to talk about the tragedy, and Pat began turning a corner. Gallimore says the "breakdown" was very hard to play and was a "huge moment" for the character. "You don’t walk away from something like that without there being wounds and scars. You recover in your own way, some people faster than others. We had so many letters of support and thanks, saying ‘it happened to me and that really helped me understand," Gallimore says. The storyline won an award for its coverage of mental health.

=== Rise and fall of Bridge Farm ===
After several growth years, a major supermarket chain placed an order which would triple Tom's sausage and pig farm production. Against Pat and Tony's advice, Tom took out a £65,000 loan from his grandmother, Peggy Woolley. Tom hired more staff, and eventually after 18 months expanded the farm. But in 2005, Tom got the news the supermarket chain was cancelling the contract, losing him 80 per cent of his turnover. Tony's brother-in-law Brian Aldridge stepped in and bought Tom's business to Home Farm, allowing his nephew to get back on his feet.

=== Bacterial outbreak ===
Environmental health officers told Pat in 2011 that there had been an outbreak of escherichia coli had been linked to Bridge Farm's ice cream. It was all soon traced to Clarrie Grundy. The bug hospitalised several people, and it was discovered Clarrie went back to work too soon after falling ill with a virus. All of Bridge Farm's produce was tainted when the newspapers and town gossips got a hold of the story. Mounting debts and a pending £10,000 fine meant Tony had to go to Lilian, his sister, for a loan. Pat and Tony decided the brand was "a dead duck" and re-branded everything as Ambridge Organics.

=== Tony's accident ===
Tony suffered a heart attack in 2012 and two years later was crushed by one of the bulls on the farm. Gallimore said at the time the storyline was "big' and "personal" for her. "Just when you thought everything was all lovely, wretched old Otto nearly killed Tony (David Troughton)," Gallimore said. "That was a good, emotional storyline. Also, it wasn’t so long ago we had the e-coli story and the farm was threatened. There are still problems to iron out after the bull attack. Pat and Tony are the great survivors."

=== The trial of Helen Titchener ===
Pat's daughter Helen stood trial in 2016 for allegedly stabbing her husband Rob, following years of domestic violence. Pat had originally condemned the union, due to Rob being a married man when the two began dating. Rob managed to turn Pat's opinion of him, and alienating her from Helen. During the trial, Pat was a witness for the prosecution. The fictional case received media attention and eventually led to Helen being acquitted. Pat told her during an emotional reunion after the trial: "You're a survivor, all right. You didn't deserve any of this - that's what the jury decided, remember that."
