= Felicity Finch =

British actress

Felicity Finch (born 14 March 1955) is a British actress, known for her Northumberland-accented portrayal of Ruth Archer in The Archers on BBC Radio 4.

== Early life ==
Felicity Finch was born in Redcar and grew up in Eaglescliffe, Co. Durham. She has three brothers, born in 1953, 1957 and 1960. Felicity attended Grangefield Grammar School (now The Grangefield Academy) in Stockton-on-Tees. She became interested in drama after attending Billingham Technical College.

She moved to London when aged 19. She trained at the London Drama Centre (Drama Centre London).

== Career ==
She has worked as an actress on TV dramas. She presented Something Understood on Radio 4 in Oct 2007 and July 2014.

=== The Archers ===
She joined The Archers in 1987 and has played Ruth Archer (née Pritchard) since then. When she joined The Archers, she lived in Brixton. When Ruth was 19, Felicity was 32. Felicity had been put forward for the role by theatre director John Blackmore.

For months, Felicity believed that her part was not to last long, until a script arrived in the post, containing the three words 'David kisses Ruth'. Felicity was totally shocked by the change in direction of the role, saying 'I nearly fell through the floor'. She thought that there had been some sort of mistake in the script, so she quickly phoned up the BBC in Birmingham, to be told by the female producer 'Congratulations, you are going to marry David Archer'. Only a few moments before, Felicity had thought that she would be playing the part for no more than a few weeks, perhaps.

The BBC recorded the marriage between Ruth and David on Thursday 17 November 1988, in a real church - St Mary the Virgin, Hanbury, and Felicity dressed as a bride as well; it was broadcast on Friday 16 December 1988. Her character Ruth originated from Tynedale in Northumberland.

For her character Ruth giving birth, in February 1993, she visited the Sorrento Maternity Hospital in Moseley, for the birth, which was broadcast on Wednesday 17 February 1993. The actual baby was Elliot Davies, son of the producer Keri Davies.

=== Voice overs ===
Finch has also worked as a voice-over artist and reported for Woman's Hour, also on Radio 4. In August 2012 she hosted the Radio 4 Appeal for Health Poverty Action.
