= Trevor Harrison =

British actor (born 1957)

Trevor Harrison (born 16 March 1957) is an English actor best known for his role as Eddie Grundy in the BBC Radio 4 soap opera, The Archers.

== Early life ==
Harrison was born in Stourbridge, Worcestershire on 16 March 1957. He was educated at the Grange secondary modern school in Stourbridge. Seeing Richard Harris in the film Camelot inspired him to become an actor, and he succeeded in getting an audition at Birmingham Theatre School. There, under Mary Richards, he thrived and when he left at the age of 18 he worked in a company touring schools and appeared in Rep in Birmingham and Coventry.

== Career ==
His television credits include In A Land of Plenty (2001), Get Some In!, Hazell and Stig of the Dump.

He also appeared for several months in Crossroads, toured with theatres, appeared in pantomime and also had his own show on the local radio station, BBC Hereford & Worcester.

In addition to his role in The Archers, he has acted in several radio plays on BBC Radio 3 and Radio 4. In 2001, was in the Radio 4 drama Cool Water Murder. He has also presented on BBC national and local radio.

Harrison has made a number of records in the guise of Eddie Grundy, and in the summer of 1996 released The World of Eddie Grundy by Trevor Harrison on Demon Records. In 2001, The Archers' 50th anniversary year, he was made an MBE for his services to radio drama, particularly for his role in The Archers.

== Personal life ==
Harrison and his wife Annette, a civilian police worker, live in south Worcestershire. He is a keen birdwatcher and carries his binoculars and field guide with him everywhere.

He was awarded the MBE in 2001.
