= Colin Skipp =

British actor (1939–2019)

Colin Skipp (8 August 1939 – 19 November 2019) was a British actor, best known for playing Tony Archer in the BBC radio series The Archers for 46 years.

Skipp won a scholarship to the Royal Academy of Dramatic Art, and studied alongside actor Charles Collingwood, who plays Brian Aldridge in The Archers.

Skipp had played the character of Tony Archer for 46 years (1967–2013), on the date of his retirement, making him the seventh longest continuously serving radio soap actor. He decided to retire after having several heart attacks and major heart surgery. The role was taken over in January 2014 by the actor David Troughton.

In 2004, he directed the stage play The Sound of Julie at the Charles Cryer Theatre, Carshalton, a dramatisation of the life of actress Julie Andrews. Skipp's daughter, Nova, was in the title role.

On 21 November 2019, the BBC's social media accounts for The Archers announced that Skipp had died on 19 November. He was 80. His former co-star Pat Gallimore, who plays Tony's wife Pat, called him "a good friend and generous colleague", and said "Colin was a very fine actor who brought truth and integrity to the role of Tony."

== See also ==
- List of longest-serving soap opera actors
