= William Ordway Partridge =

American sculptor, teacher and author

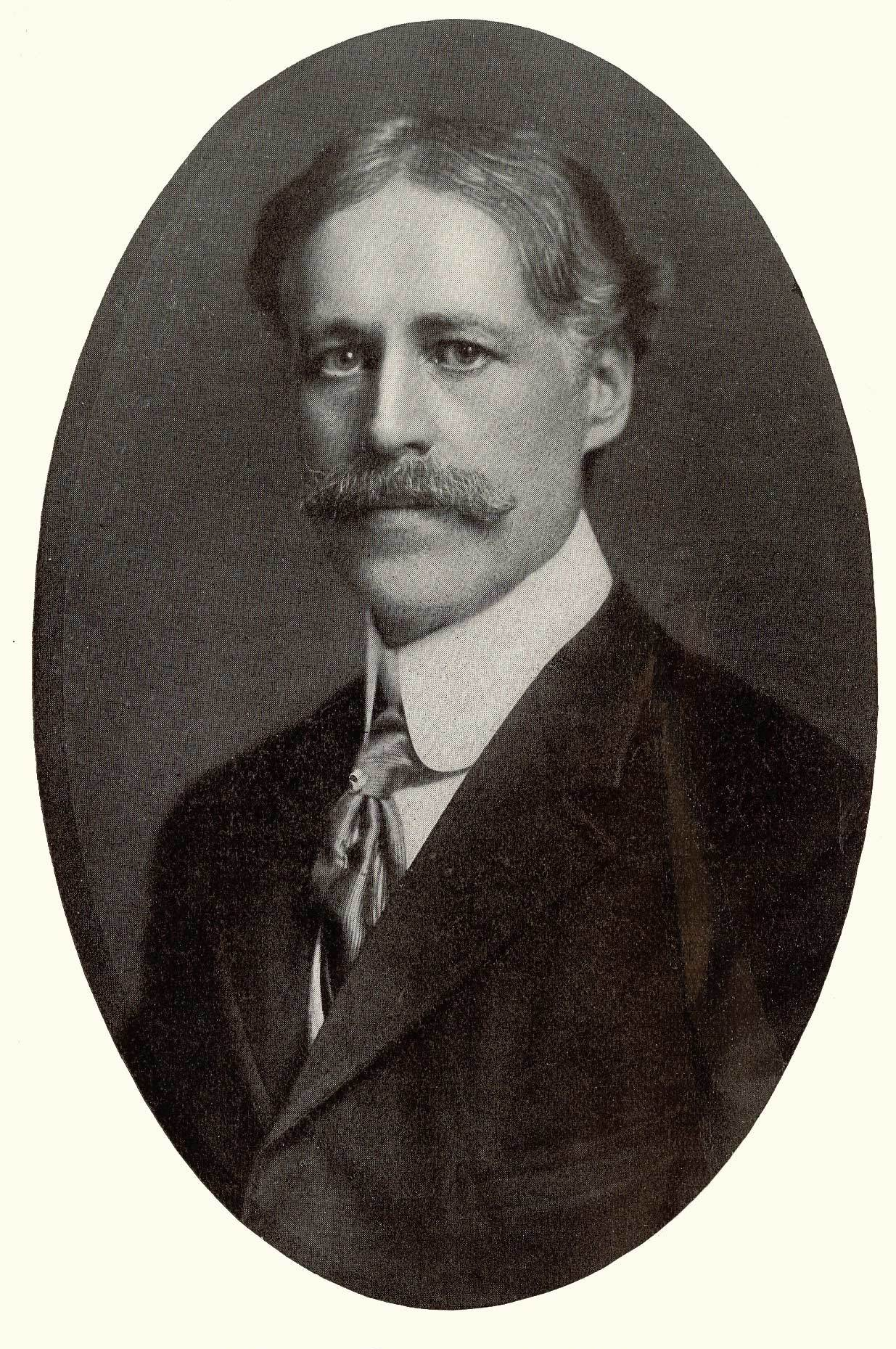
- Born: April 11, 1861; Paris, France
- Died: May 22, 1930 (aged 69); New York City, US
- Education: Adelphi Academy (Brooklyn); Columbia University private study under Fortunato Galli, Antonin Mercié, William-Adolphe Bouguereau & Pio Welonski
- Known for: sculptures, busts, bas reliefs
- Notable work: William Shakespeare (1894); Equestrian statue of General Ulysses S. Grant (1896); Pietà (1906); Pocahontas (1907)
- Spouse(s): 1. Augusta Merriam; (married 1887; divorced 1904); 2. Margaret Ridgely Schott (married 1905; to his death)

William Ordway Partridge (April 11, 1861 – May 22, 1930) was an American sculptor, teacher and author. Among his best-known works are the Shakespeare Monument in Chicago, the equestrian statue of General Grant in Brooklyn, the Pietà at St. Patrick's Cathedral in Manhattan, and the Pocahontas statue in Jamestown, Virginia.

== Life and career ==
He was born in Paris, the younger son of George Sidney Partridge, Jr. and Helen Derby Catlin. His father was the Paris representative for the New York City department store A.T. Stewart. His mother was a cousin of the painter George Catlin. His brother, Sidney Catlin Partridge, became a bishop of the Episcopal Church.

=== Education ===
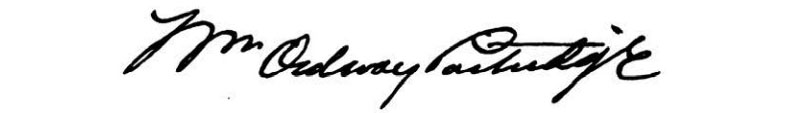

Partridge's family returned to New York City in 1868, and enrolled him in Cheshire Academy in Connecticut, followed by Adelphi Academy in Brooklyn. He entered Columbia University in autumn 1881, but had to withdraw because of poor health. He traveled to Europe in 1882, and studied in Florence in the studio of Fortunato Galli, where he became friends with the young Bernard Berenson. Although he never formally enrolled at the Ecole de Beaux-Arts, he audited classes there in autumn 1883, and studied briefly in the Paris studio of sculptor Antonin Mercié. He returned to New York City in Spring 1884, and enrolled in the American Academy of Dramatic Arts. He appeared in a New York City production of David Copperfield, and moved to Boston, where he supported himself by giving dramatic readings of Shakespeare and the Romantic poets. He continued to sculpt, and received encouragement in this from his cousin, the sculptor John Rogers.

In 1887, he married Augusta Merriam, a wealthy widow from Milton, Massachusetts, who was 15 years older. They traveled to Europe that year, where he studied briefly in the Paris studio of painter William-Adolphe Bouguereau. There he formed a close friendship with the neo-Gothic architect Ralph Adams Cram. The couple moved to Rome, where he studied in the studio of Polish sculptor Pio Welonski. They returned to Milton, Massachusetts in 1889, where he established his own studio.

=== Sculptures ===
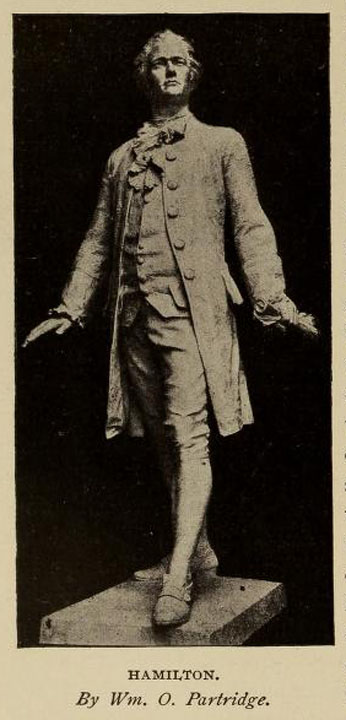
Alexander Hamilton (1893), plaster model at the World's Columbian Exposition

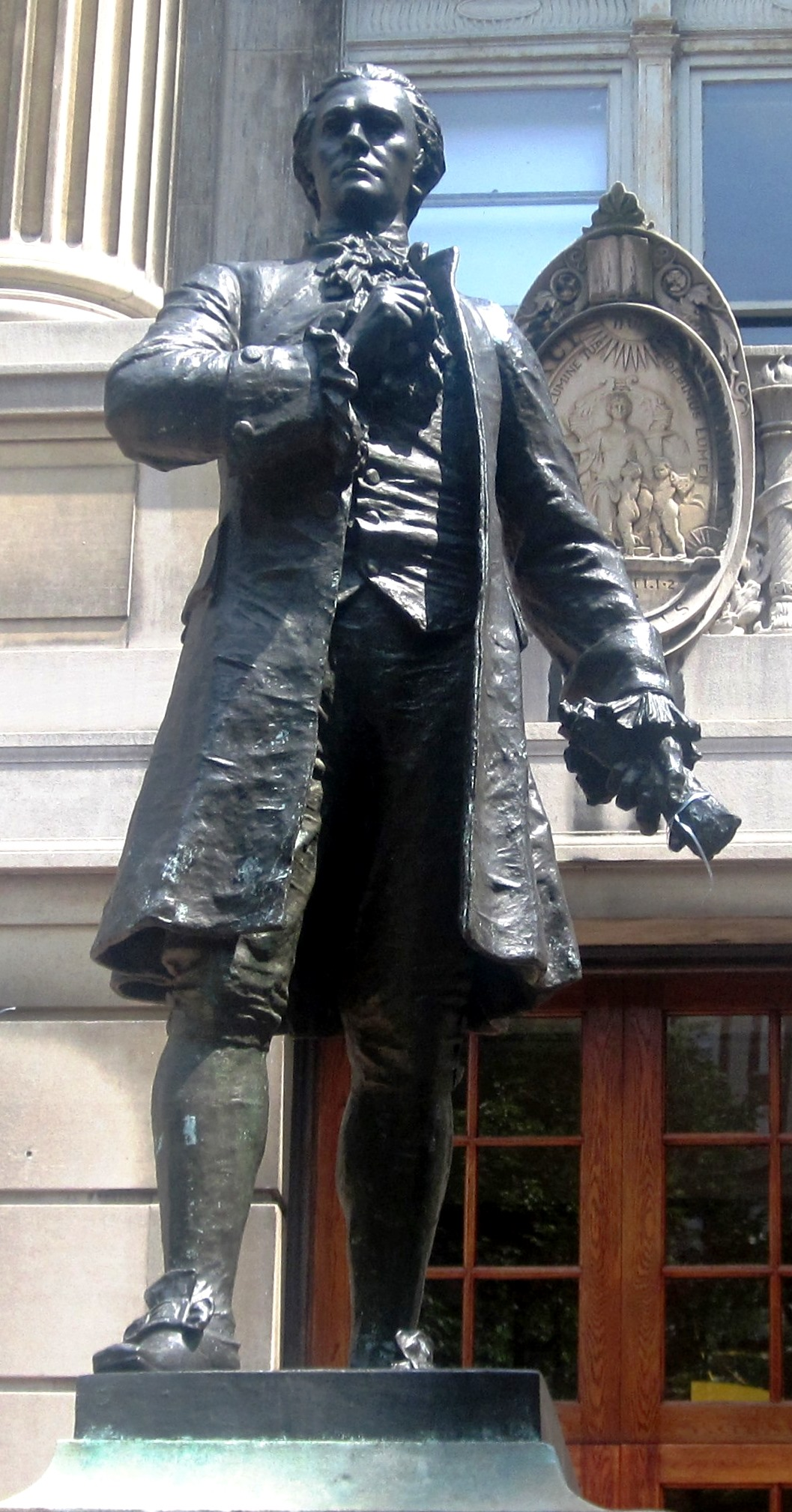
Alexander Hamilton (1908), in front of Hamilton Hall, Columbia University

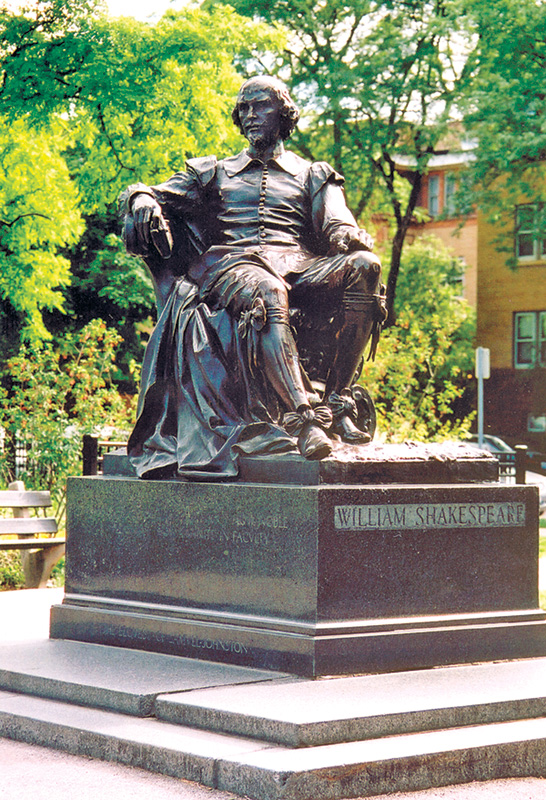
Shakespeare Monument (1894), Lincoln Park, Chicago, Illinois

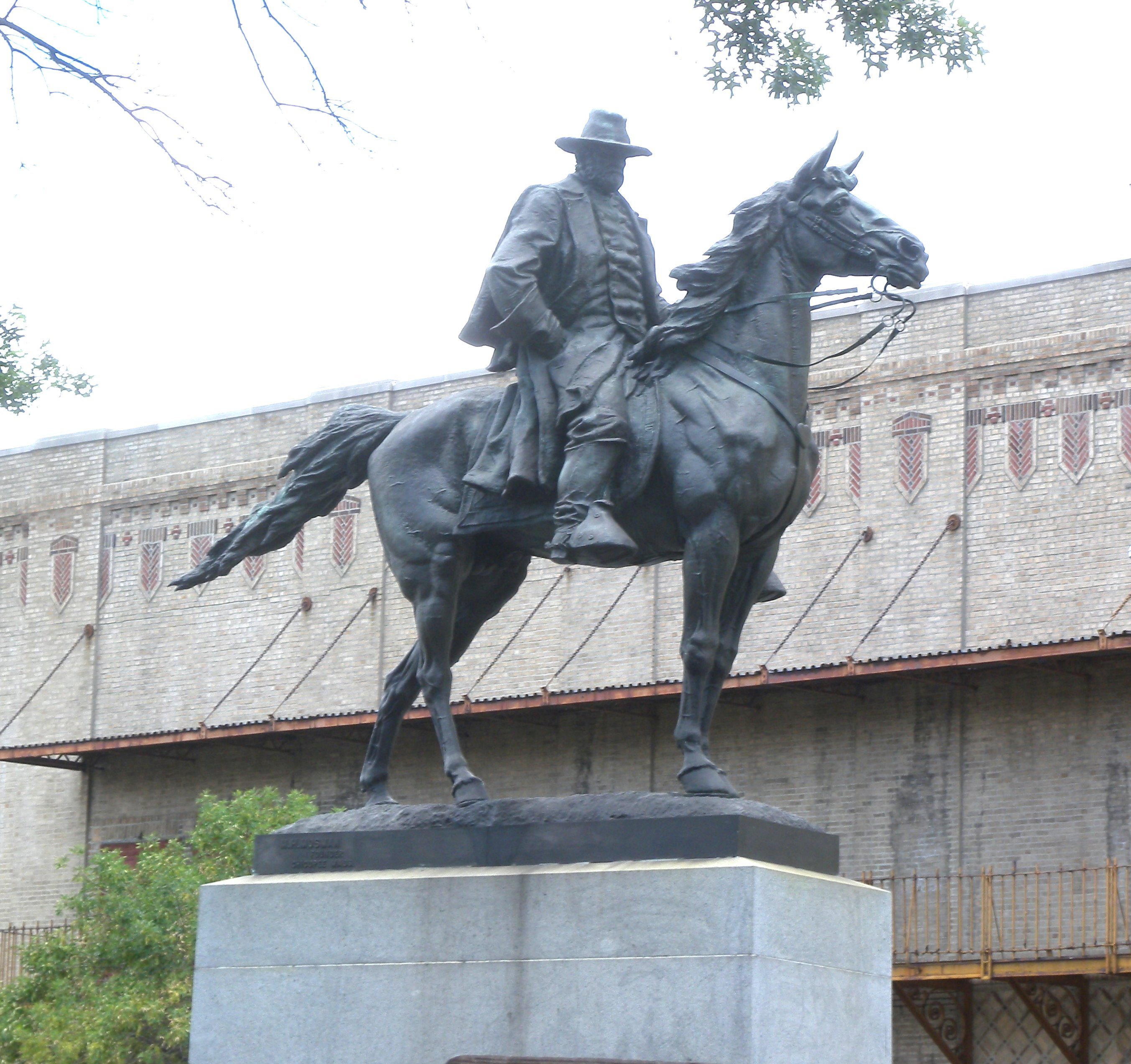
General Ulysses S. Grant (1896), Grant Square, Brooklyn, New York City

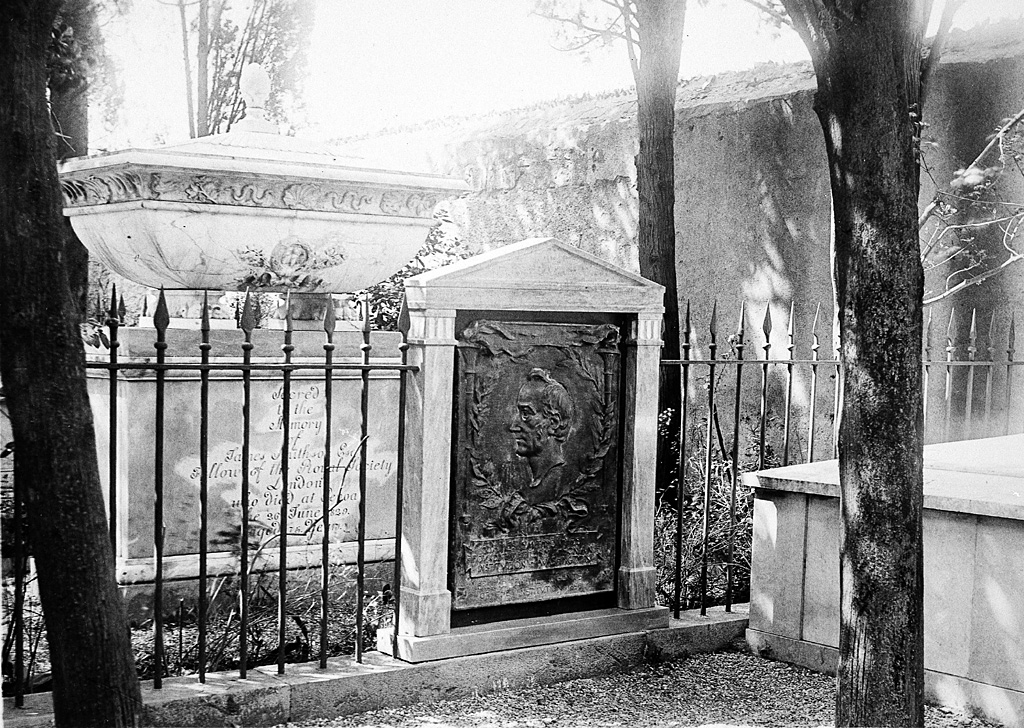
Partridge's bronze memorial tablet (1896), at James Smithson's gravesite in Genoa, Italy, 1897.

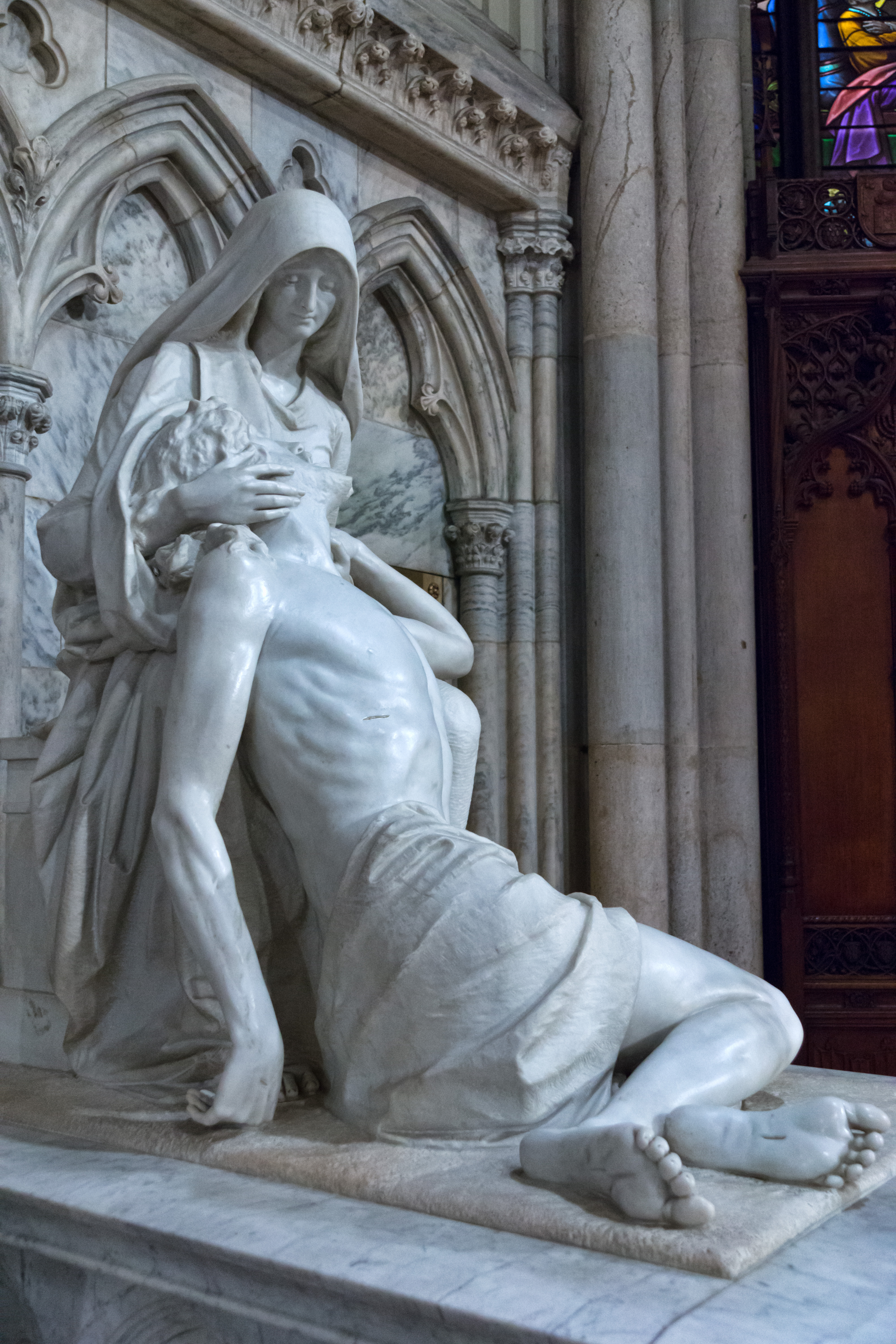
Pietà (1905), St. Patrick's Cathedral, New York City

Partridge created two larger-than-life bronze statues of Alexander Hamilton, executed 15 years apart. The first was commissioned by the Hamilton Club of Brooklyn, installed in front of the club's headquarters in Brooklyn Heights, and dedicated on October 4, 1893. For months before and after that dedication, Partridge's full-size plaster model of Hamilton was on exhibition at the World's Columbian Exposition in Chicago. The bronze statue stood in Brooklyn until 1936, when it was relocated to The Grange, Hamilton's country house in northern Manhattan. The second Hamilton statue was commissioned by the Alumni Association of Columbia College [now University]. It was installed on campus in front of Hamilton Hall, and dedicated on May 27, 1908. Both Hamilton statues stand in northern Manhattan, less than 1.5 mi (2.4 km) apart.

In 1890, Partridge won a national competition to create a statue of William Shakespeare for Chicago, Illinois. He returned to Paris, where he set up a studio to work on the project. He exhibited his full-size plaster model of Shakespeare at the 1893 World's Columbian Exposition in Chicago, along with nine other works. (Note: The revised catalogue of the Department of Fine Arts listed 10 works by Partridge: Head of Christ (marble); Plaster replica of statue of Shakespeare for Lincoln Park, Chicago; Madonna (plaster); Portrait bust of a Lady (marble); Plaster replica of the statue of Alexander Hamilton for the Hamilton Club, Brooklyn; The Summer Night (relief in marble); Nearing Home (marble bust); Portrait of Edward Everett Hale (bronze bust); Bust of James Russell Lowell (plaster); and A Dream (marble).) His bronze Shakespeare was installed in Lincoln Park the following spring, and dedicated on April 23, 1894, the Bard's 330th birthday. Partridge wrote a sonnet for its dedication. (Note: For a Statue of Shakespeare Who models thee must be thine intimate— Nor place thee on a grand uplifted base, Where tired eyes can hardly reach thy face. For others this might serve; thou art too great. Who sculptures thee must grasp thy human state, Thine all embracing love must aim to trace,— Thy oneness with the lowliest of thy race. Until this sculptor comes the world must wait; But when he comes, carving those deep set eyes, 'Neath brow o'erarching, like the heaven's high dome, The men will turn aside with glad surprise And say, slow wending from their toil toward home, I saw this Shakespeare in the street; he seemed A man like you or me, howe'er, he dreamed.)

The Equestrian Statue of General Ulysses S. Grant (1895–1896) was Partridge's most colossal work. Commissioned by the Union League Club of Brooklyn, it was installed in the center of Bedford Avenue, in front of the Club's headquarters, and dedicated on April 27, 1896. The bronze horse and rider are approximately 12 ft (3.7 m) in height, and stand upon a granite pedestal approximately 15 ft (4.6 m) in height.

A bequest from Englishman James Smithson (c. 1765–1829) funded the creation of the Smithsonian Institution. Partridge was commissioned in 1896 to create a bronze memorial tablet commemorating that bequest for Smithson's gravesite in Genoa, Italy. (Note: Inscription: "James Smithson - FRS [Fellow of The Royal Society of London for Improving Natural Knowledge] - Founder of the Smithsonian Institution - Washington Erected by the Regents of the Institution 1896.") He based his relief portrait of Smithson on an 1817 relief portrait taken from life by Pierre-Joseph Tiolier (formerly attributed to Antonio Canova). Partridge initially made two casts of the bronze tablet, one for the gravesite and the other for the nearby Protestant Chapel of the Holy Spirit. He made a third bronze cast in 1898 for Smithson's alma mater, Pembrook College, University of Oxford. The gravesite's bronze tablet was stolen, and the chapel's bronze tablet was used as a model for a marble copy, that was installed at the gravesite in 1900. Upon learning that the Genoa cemetery was to be destroyed for the expansion of an adjacent quarry, Alexander Graham Bell, a member of the Smithsonian's Board of Regents, proposed that Smithson's remains be brought to the United States. In 1904, Smithson's remains and grave monument were relocated to the Crypt of the Smithsonian's Castle Building in Washington, D.C. The 1900 marble copy of Partridge's tablet was part of that move. The Chapel of the Holy Spirit was destroyed by Allied bombing during World War II. A marble copy of Partridge's tablet was carved in 1963, and stands today at the site of the chapel.

Partridge's most famous religious work is the larger-than-life Pietà he created for St. Patrick's Cathedral, Manhattan. The dead Christ is collapsed before a seated Mary, who cradles his face with her hand. Critic Robert Burns Wilson wrote a sensitive appreciation of the work. (Note: "In the treatment of the great subject nothing has been forgotten. Here is the breadth—the avoidance of trivialities—the strength which the purely critical view demands. This dead Christ is dead; this is the body of the man who died hanging upon the cross. The strained muscles of the arms recall those dreadful hours. We note all these things, feeling that they are nothing; so perfect is the art that they seem natural actualities, and we so accept them. It is, however, not exactly within the province of words to depict what we feel when we see the Mother's unconscious action, prompted by the hunger of her breaking heart, as she uplifts and holds the body with the head on her arm; we see the instinctive effort of her beginning to realize, in some sense, if only for a moment, some semblance of the life that is gone. It is the cry of the mother's heart, pitiful and pitying, over the son who she knows is dead. It is also the cry of the breast, the arms, the hands, which must feel once that he is alive. One looks at this group and there he realises, if never before, that what is human is divine.") Carved from white Carrara marble, Pietà is located in the Ambulatory behind the High Altar.

The Association for the Preservation of Virginia Antiquities commissioned Partridge to create a larger-than-life bronze statue of Pocahontas, the Native American princess, for the 1907 Jamestown Exposition in Norfolk, Virginia. The exposition commemorated the 300th anniversary of the founding of the first permanent English settlement in the Americas. Pocahontus stood in front of the Administration Building for the exposition, and APVA later loaned the statue to the Corcoran Gallery of Art in Washington, D.C. APVA donated the statue to Jamestown, where it was re-dedicated on June 3, 1922. Queen Elizabeth II visited Jamestown in 1957 for the 350th anniversary, and was charmed by the statue. Her reaction inspired a posthumous replica to be cast, which was presented by the Governor of Virginia as a gift to the British people. Dedicated on October 5, 1958, the bronze replica was installed outside St. George's, Gravesend, the English church in which Pocahontas had been interred in 1617.

=== Teacher ===
Partridge lectured at the National Social Science Association, the Concord School of Philosophy, and the Brooklyn Institute. From 1897 to 1903, he lectured at what is now George Washington University, in Washington, D.C., and went on to lecture at Stanford University in California.

He wrote a manual on sculpting: Technique of Sculpture (1895).

Partridge's studio was at 15 West 38th Street, Manhattan. Lee Lawrie was among his studio assistants.

=== Personal ===
Partridge and Augusta Merriam had a daughter together, also named Augusta (d. 1916). The couple divorced in 1904.

On June 14, 1905 he married the poet Margaret Ridgely Schott. They had a daughter together, also named Margaret. (Note: Margaret Livingston Partridge (1909-1996) married William A. M. Burden 3rd in 1931. He wrote a loving memoir of their marriage, called Peggy and I: A Life Too Busy for a Dull Moment (1983).)

Partridge died in Manhattan, New York City, on May 22, 1930.

== Selected works ==
=== Major commissions ===
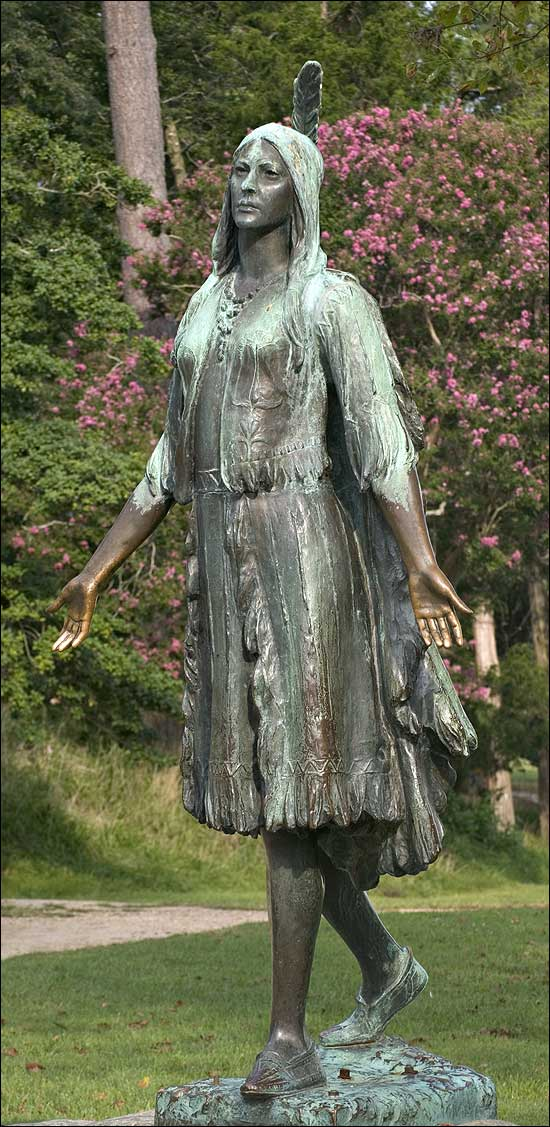
Pocahontas (ca.1906), Jamestown, Virginia

- Bust of Charles H. Hackley (1890). Muskegon Museum of Art, Muskegon, Michigan.
- Alexander Hamilton (1892), Hamilton Grange, Manhattan, New York City. Commissioned by the Hamilton Club of Brooklyn, the plaster of this was exhibited at Chicago's 1893 World's Columbian Exposition, and the bronze stood in front of the Club's Brooklyn Heights building from 1893 to 1936. It was then relocated to the grounds of The Grange, Hamilton's country house in Manhattan.
- William Shakespeare Monument (1893), Lincoln Park, Chicago, Illinois
- Equestrian statue of General Ulysses S. Grant (bronze, 1896), Grant Square, Bedford Avenue & Dean Street, Crown Heights, Brooklyn, New York City. Commissioned by the Union Club of Brooklyn, and unveiled April 27, 1896.
- John Reece Monument (bronze, 1896), Forest Hills Cemetery, Boston, Massachusetts
- Adin Ballou Memorial (bronze, 1900), Hopewell, Massachusetts
- Christalan (marble, 1900), Spencer Trask Memorial, Yaddo, Saratoga Springs, New York. "Christalan" was the tile character of Katrina Trask's epic poem about a teenage boy apprenticed to a knight. The author and her husband commissioned the sculpture as a memorial to their four children, who all died young.
- Jordan Font (marble, c.1904), Baptistery, National Cathedral, Washington, D.C. (Note: The Font is made of pure white Carrara marble. It is octagonal in shape, fifteen feet in diameter, and raised on three steps. In the interior there are stone steps for descending into the water when the font is used for immersion. In the center of the Font stands the figure of the risen Christ, with upraised hand, giving the great command recorded in the last chapter of St. Matthew's Gospel, "Go ye therefore and teach all nations, baptising them in the name of the Father, and of the Son, and of the Holy Ghost," while in his left arm he holds a little child, symbolizing the command that he gave St. Peter, after His resurrection, "Feed my Lambs." In His hand and sides are the wounds made when He was upon the Cross. The principal events of our Lord's life, especially those recorded in the Apostles' Creed, are sculptured on the eight exterior panels of the Font, as follows: (1) The Nativity, (2) the Baptism, (3) the Calling of the Apostles, (4) the Crucifixion, (5) the Resurrection, (6) the Ascension, (7) the Day of Pentecost, (8) the Coming of Christ to ransom His own at the Judgment Day. At each corner of the octagon stand the following Apostolic figures—St. Peter, St. Paul, St. John, Joseph of Arithathea, St. James of Jerusalem, St. Mark, St. Matthew and St. Luke.)
- Pietà (white marble, 1905), Ambulatory, St. Patrick's Cathedral, Manhattan, New York City.
- Pocahontas (bronze, c.1906), Jamestown, Virginia
  - A posthumous 1958 cast of Pocahontas stands near her gravesite at St. George's Church, Gravesend, England.
- Nathan Hale (bronze, 1907), Nathan Hale Park, Summit & Portland Avenues, St. Paul, Minnesota (Note: Partridge published a poem and essay, with a vita of Hale co-written by George Cary Eggleston, Nathan Hale, The Ideal Patriot, 1902, in part to generate interest for his sculpture, which occupied a chapter entitled "The creation of an ideal work.")
  - The commission for a Nathan Hale statue at Yale University went to sculptor Bela Pratt.
- Alexander Hamilton (bronze, 1908), Hamilton Hall, Columbia University, Manhattan, New York City
- Joseph Pulitzer Memorial (1913). Woodlawn Cemetery, The Bronx, New York City
- Thomas Jefferson (bronze, 1914), Pulitzer Hall, Columbia University, Manhattan, New York City
  - Partridge's plaster model (1901) is at the New York Historical Society, Manhattan.
  - Partridge's plaster maquette (c.1914) is at the Memorial Art Gallery, University of Rochester.
- Horace Greeley Memorial (bronze, 1914), Sawmill Parkway, Chappaqua, New York
- Memory (marble, 1914), Memorial Art Gallery, University of Rochester, Rochester, New York. The sculpture's base features a bas relief bust of James G. Avrell, in whose memory the art gallery was founded.
- Samuel H. Kauffman Memorial (marble & bronze, c.1921), Rock Creek Cemetery, Washington, D.C. A bronze figure seated on a granite exedra, with 7 bronze bas-relief panels depicting Shakespeare's Seven Ages of Man.
- Samuel J. Tilden (bronze, 1926), Riverside Drive at 112th Street, Manhattan, New York City
- Paris Gibson (bronze, c.1928), Gibson Park, Great Falls, Montana
- Lion Gardiner (bronze, 1930), Fort Saybrook Monument Park, Old Saybrook, Connecticut. Inscription: "In Memory of Lion Gardiner, Builder and Commander of Saybrook Fort, 1635 — 1639." This sculpture was Partridge's last major work.

=== Gallery ===
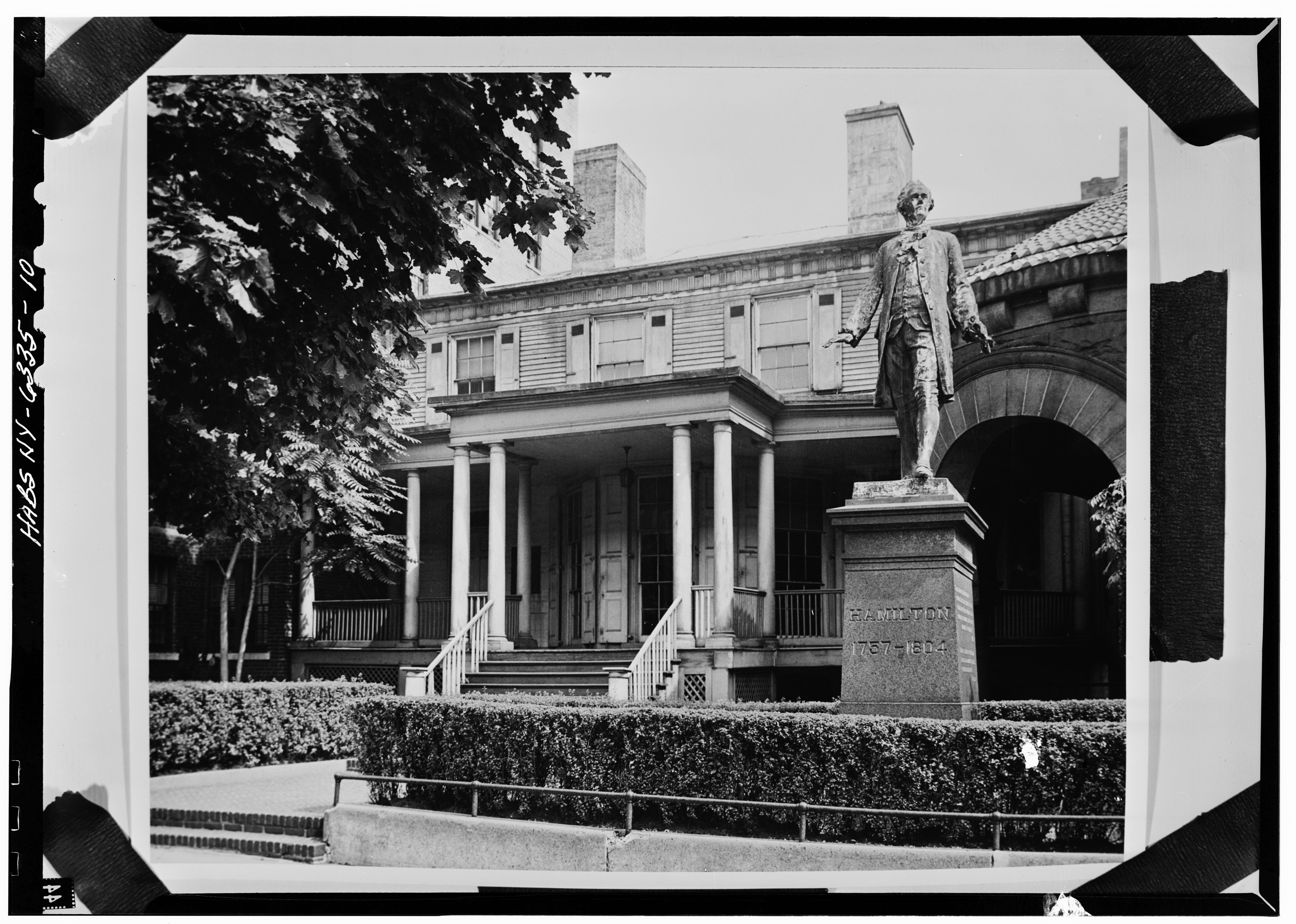
Alexander Hamilton (1892) was relocated to The Grange in Manhattan in 1936.

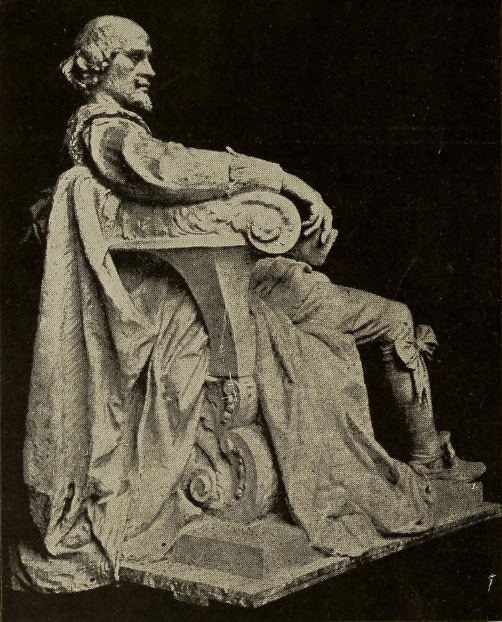
Partridge's plaster model of Shakespeare at the 1893 World's Columbian Exposition

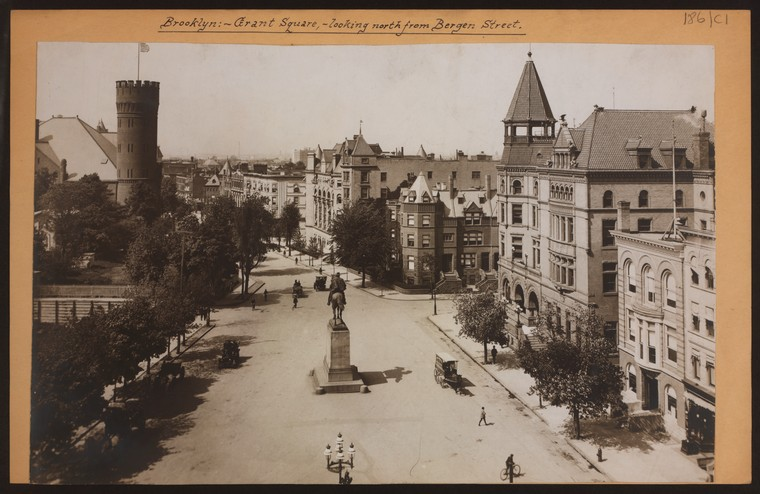
General Grant (1896), Grant Square, Brooklyn, New York City, 1905

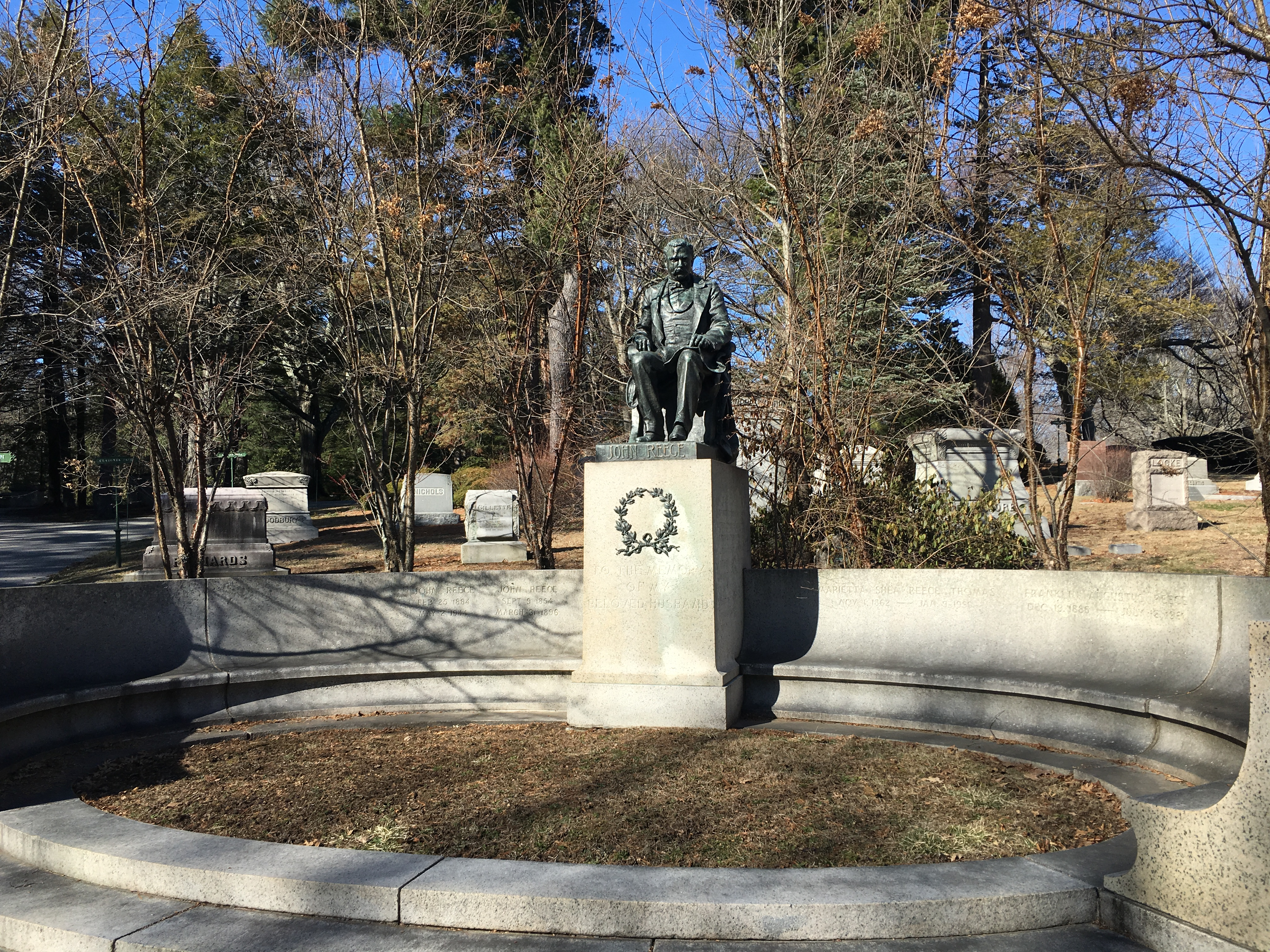
John Reece Monument (1896), Forest Hills Cemetery, Boston, Massachusetts

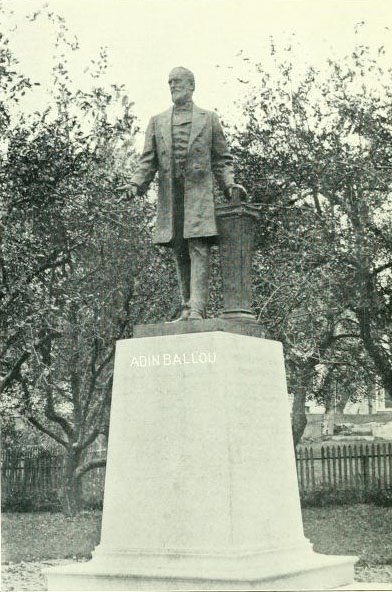
Adin Ballou Memorial (1900), Hopewell, Massachusetts

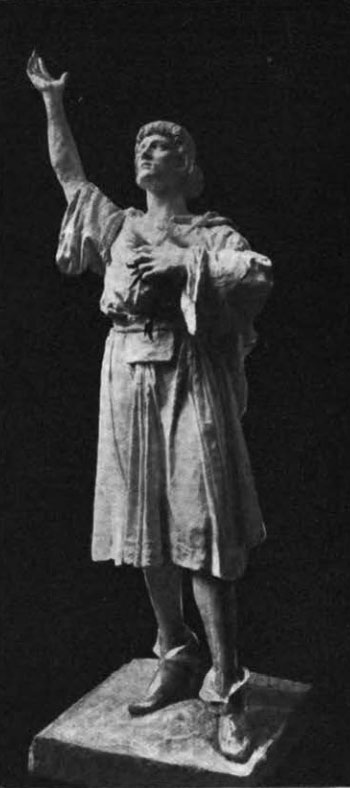
Christalan (1900), Trask Memorial, Saratoga Springs, New York

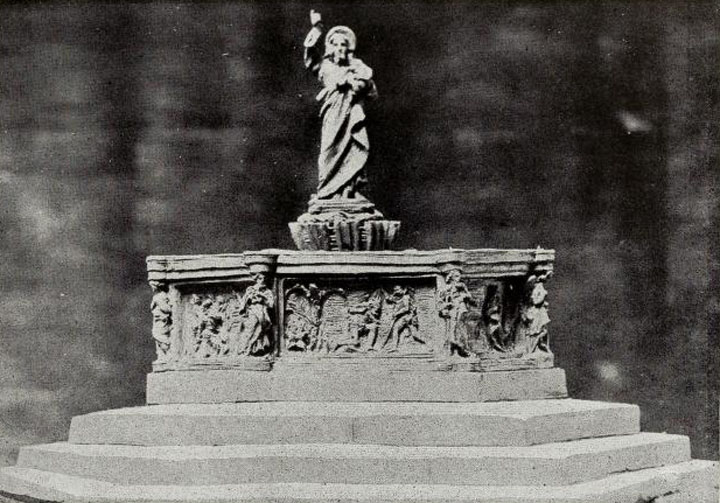
Sketch for Jordan Font (1902), National Cathedral, Washington, D.C.

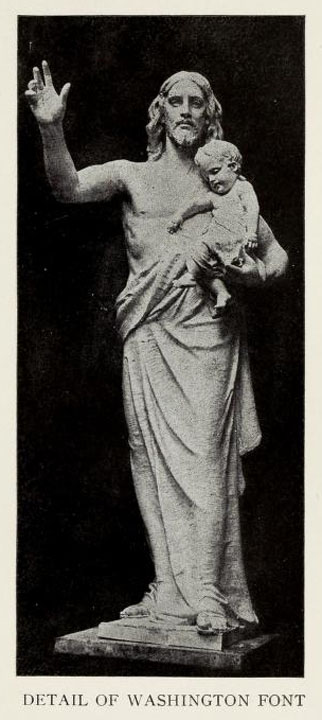
The Risen Christ (1904), Jordan Font, National Cathedral, Washington, D.C.

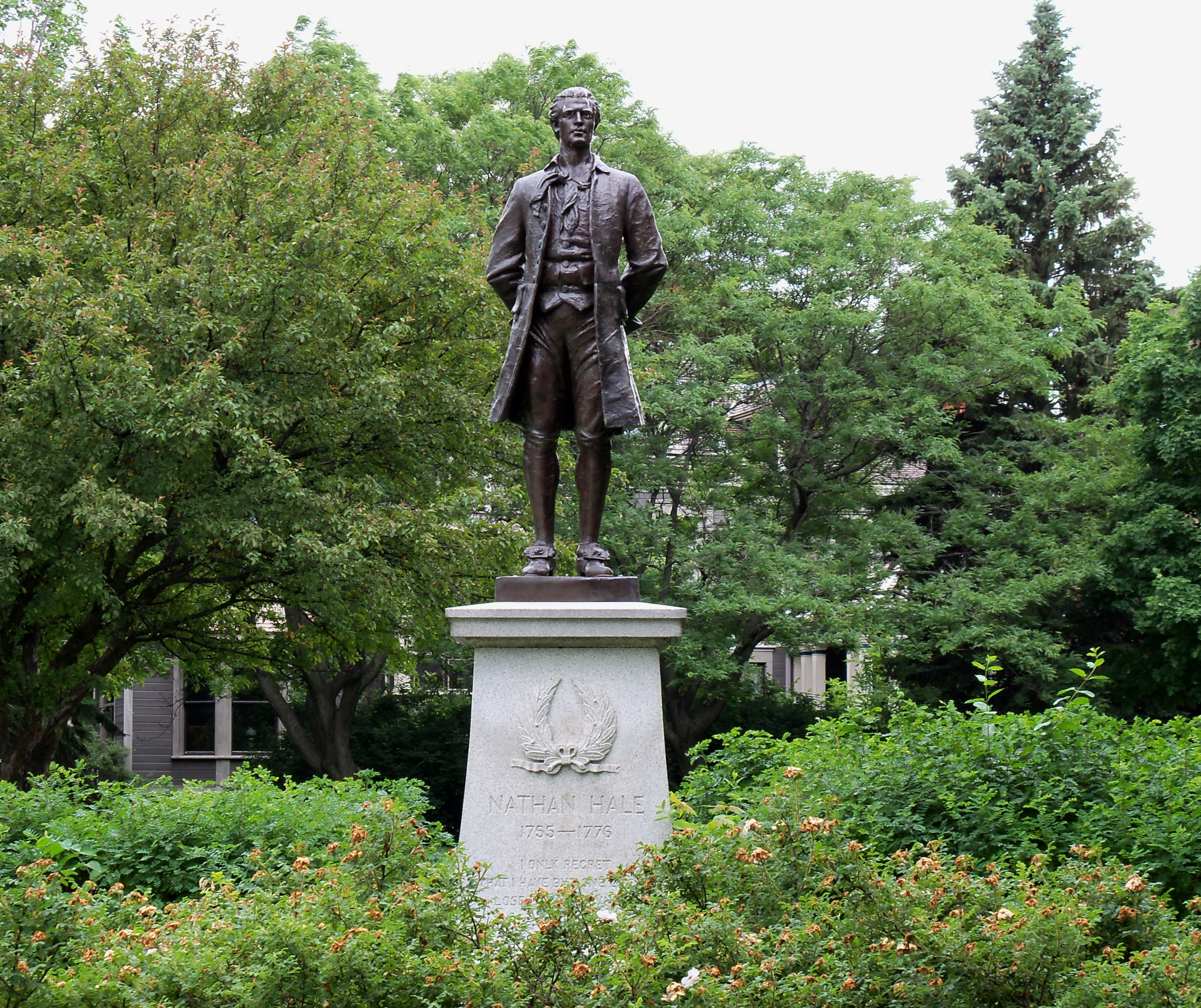
Nathan Hale (1907), Nathan Hale Park, St. Paul, Minnesota

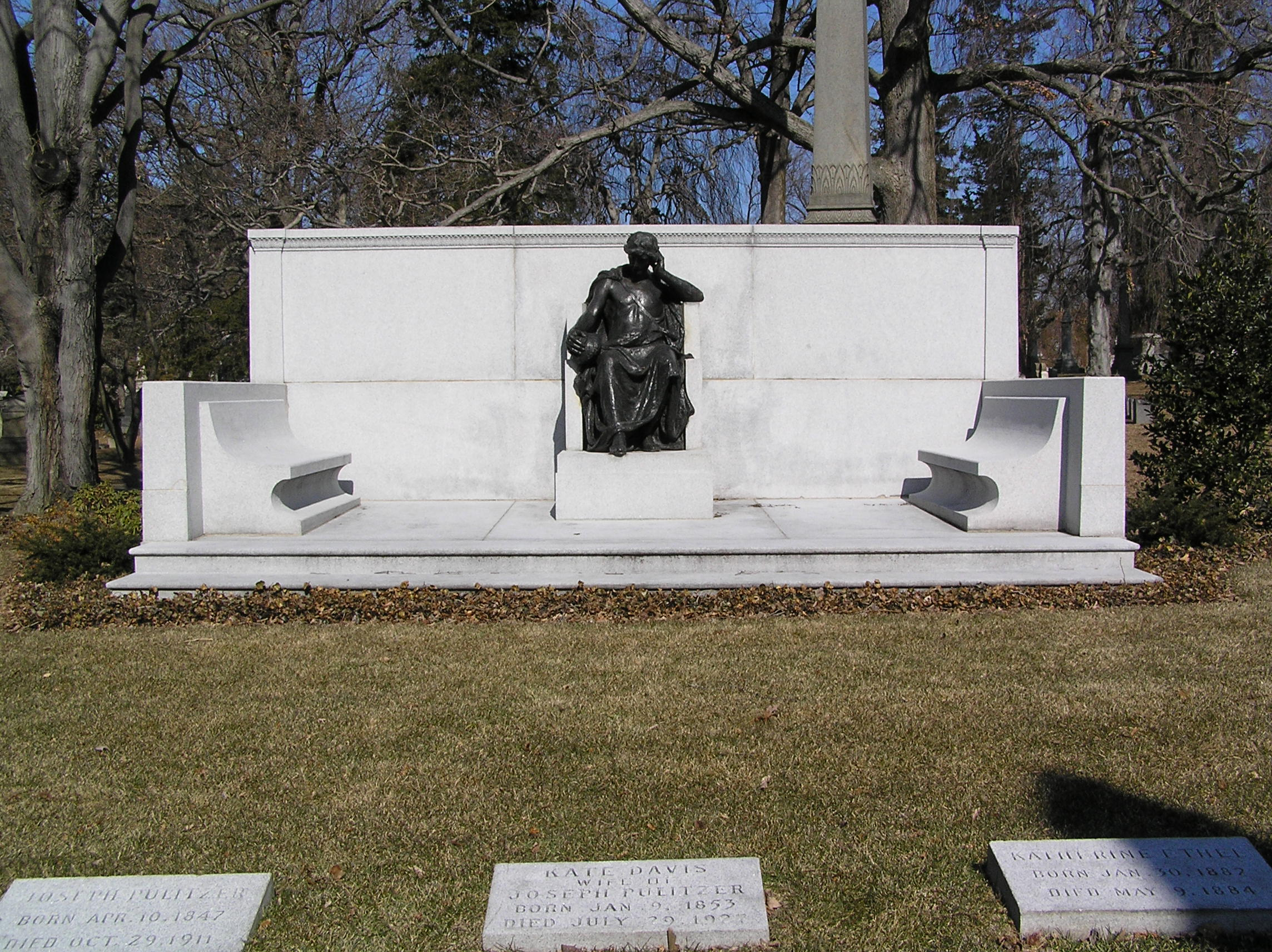
Joseph Pulitzer Memorial (1913), Woodlawn Cemetery, New York City

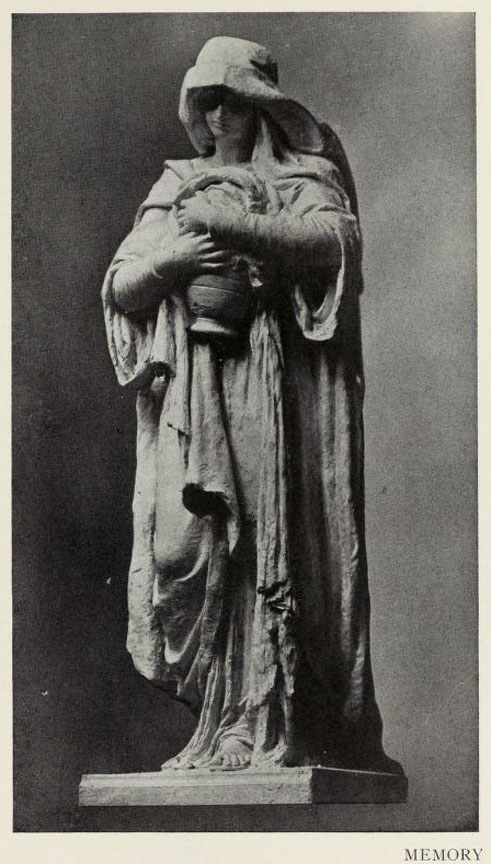
Memory (1914), Memorial Art Gallery, Rochester, New York

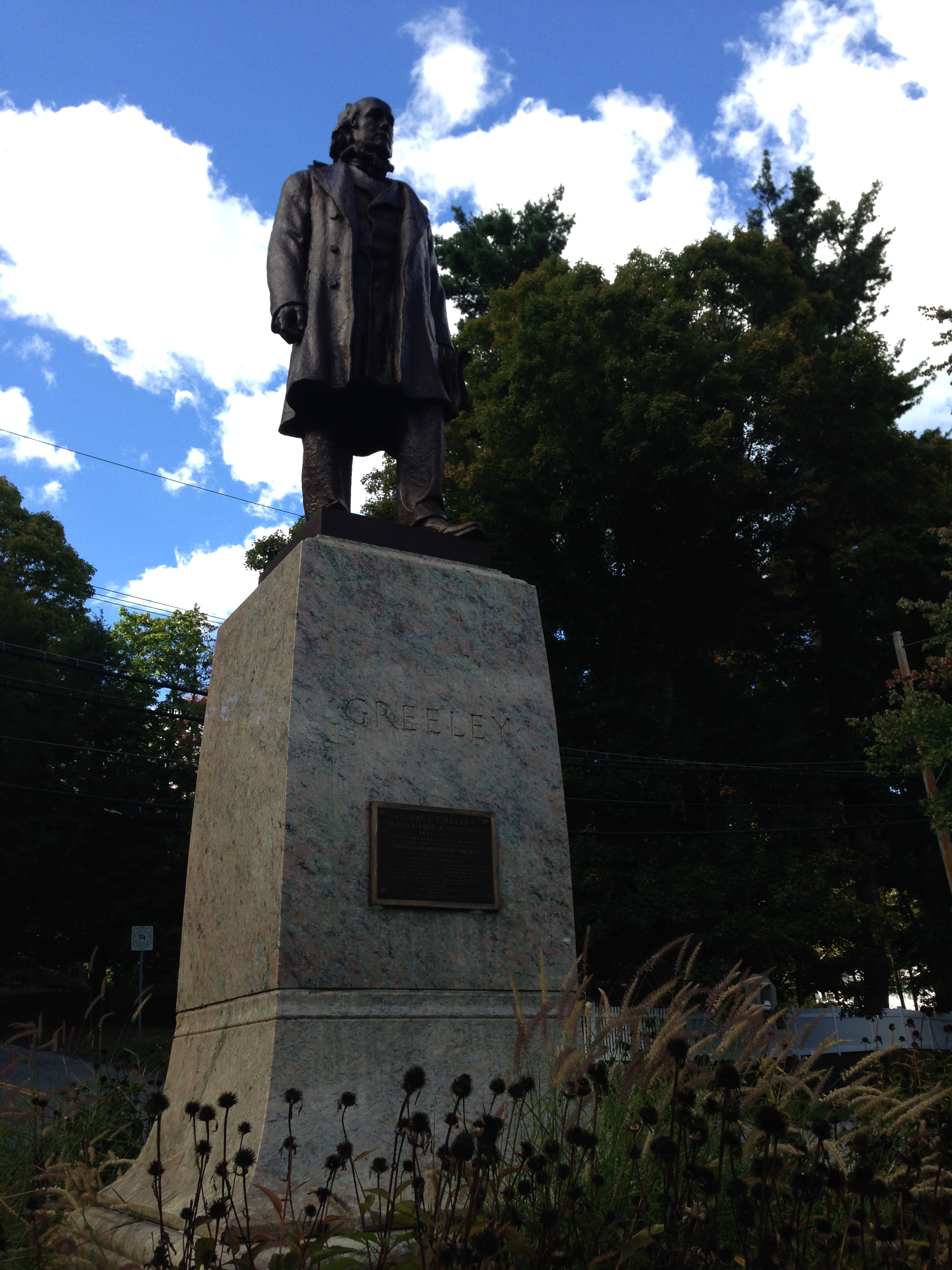
Horace Greeley (1914), Chappaqua, New York

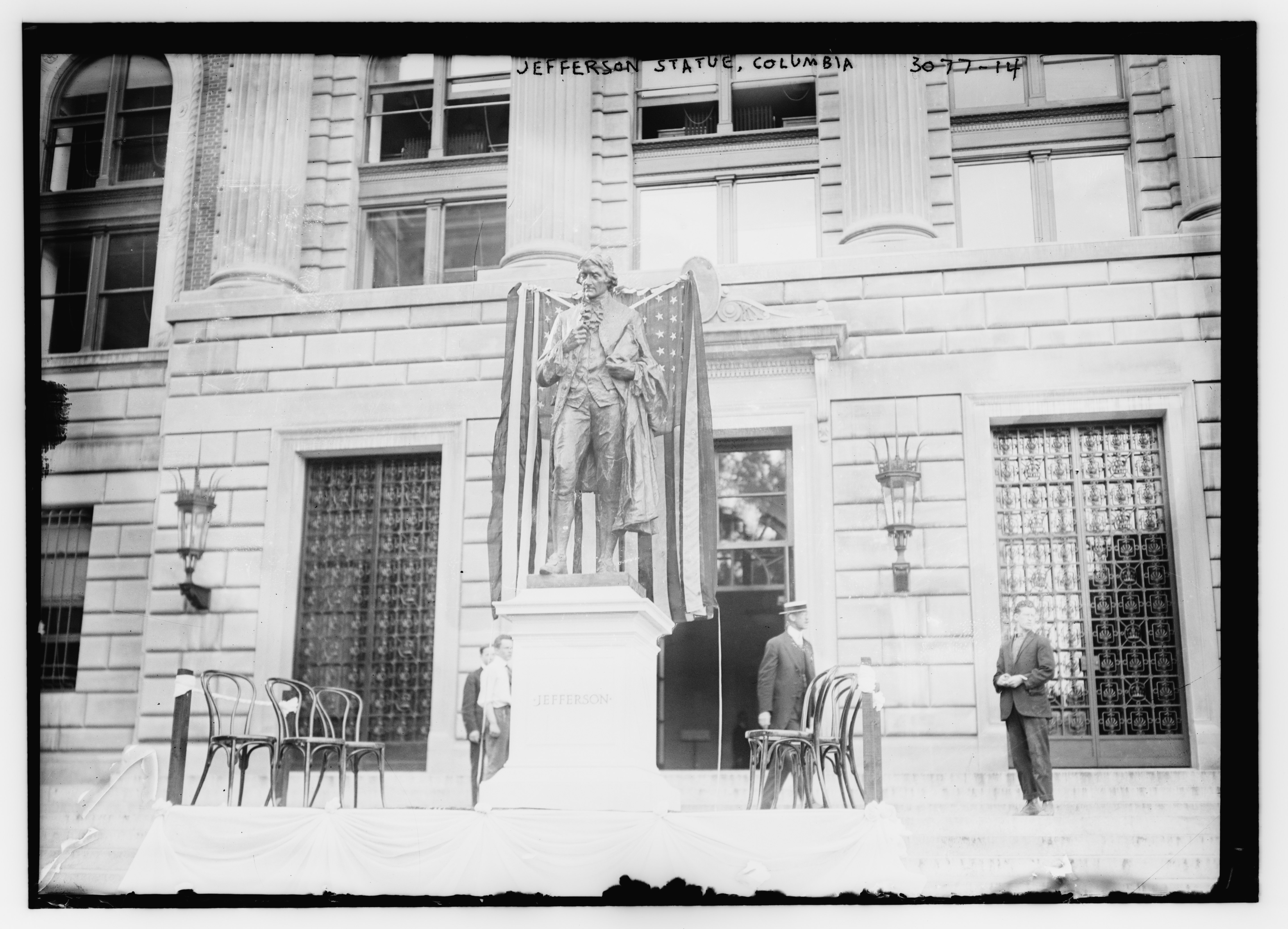
Thomas Jefferson (1914), Columbia University, New York City

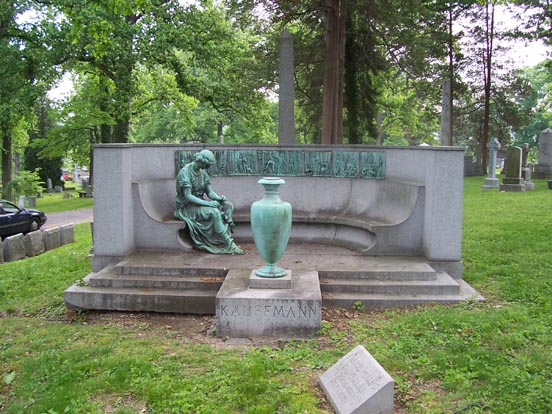
Samuel H. Kauffman Memorial (ca. 1921), Washington, D.C.

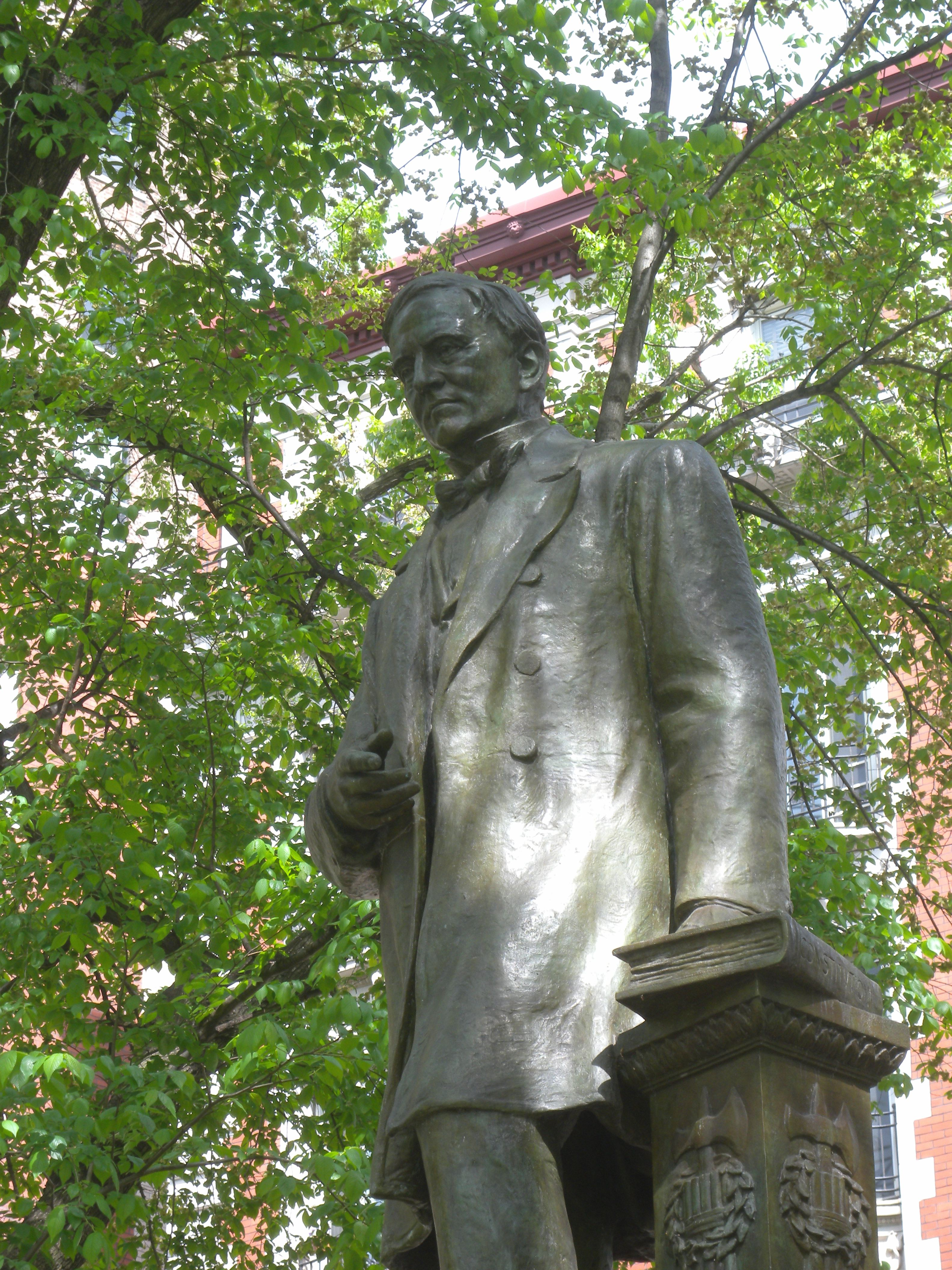
Samuel J. Tilden (1926), Riverside Drive, New York City

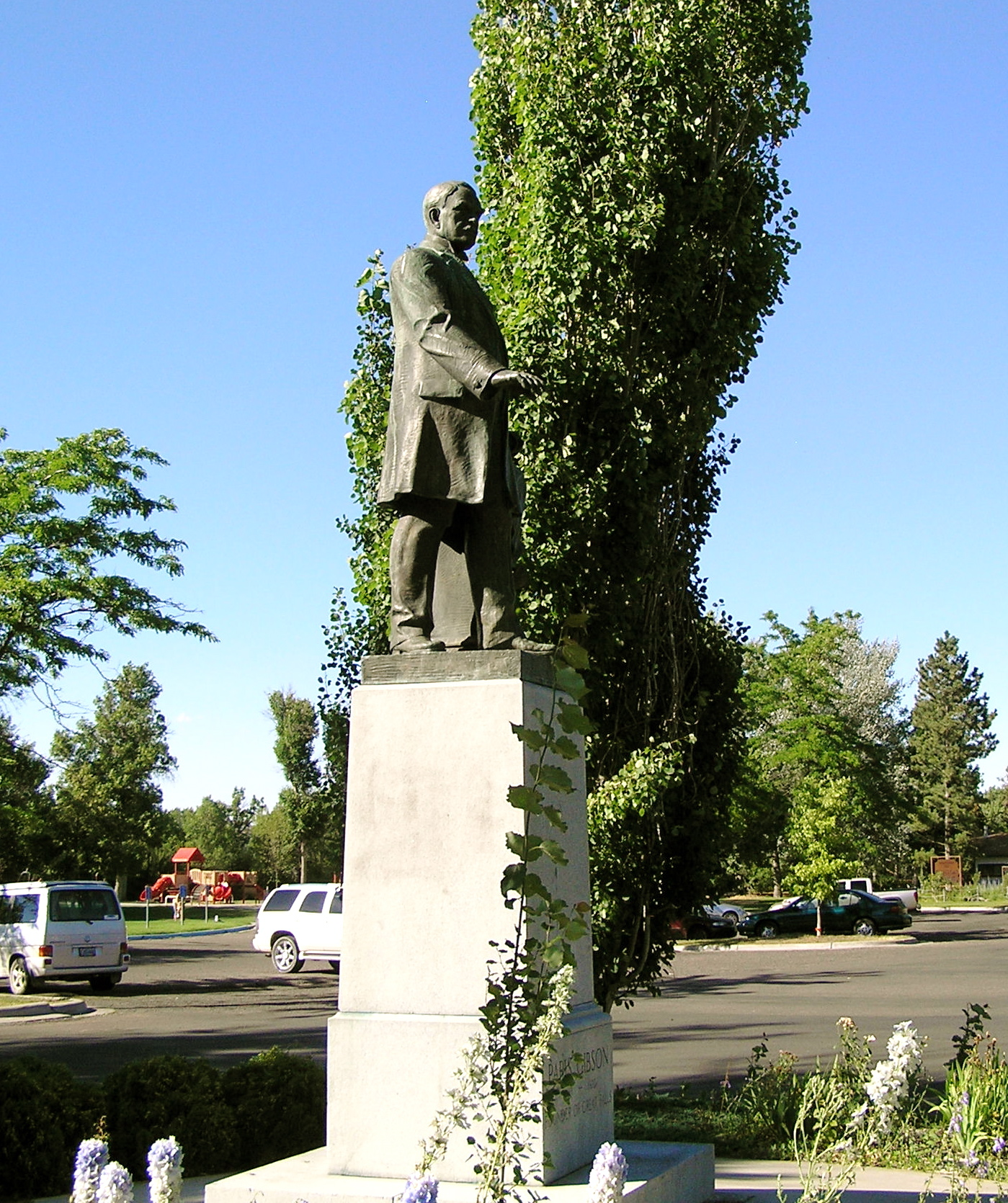
Paris Gibson (ca. 1928), Great Falls, Montana

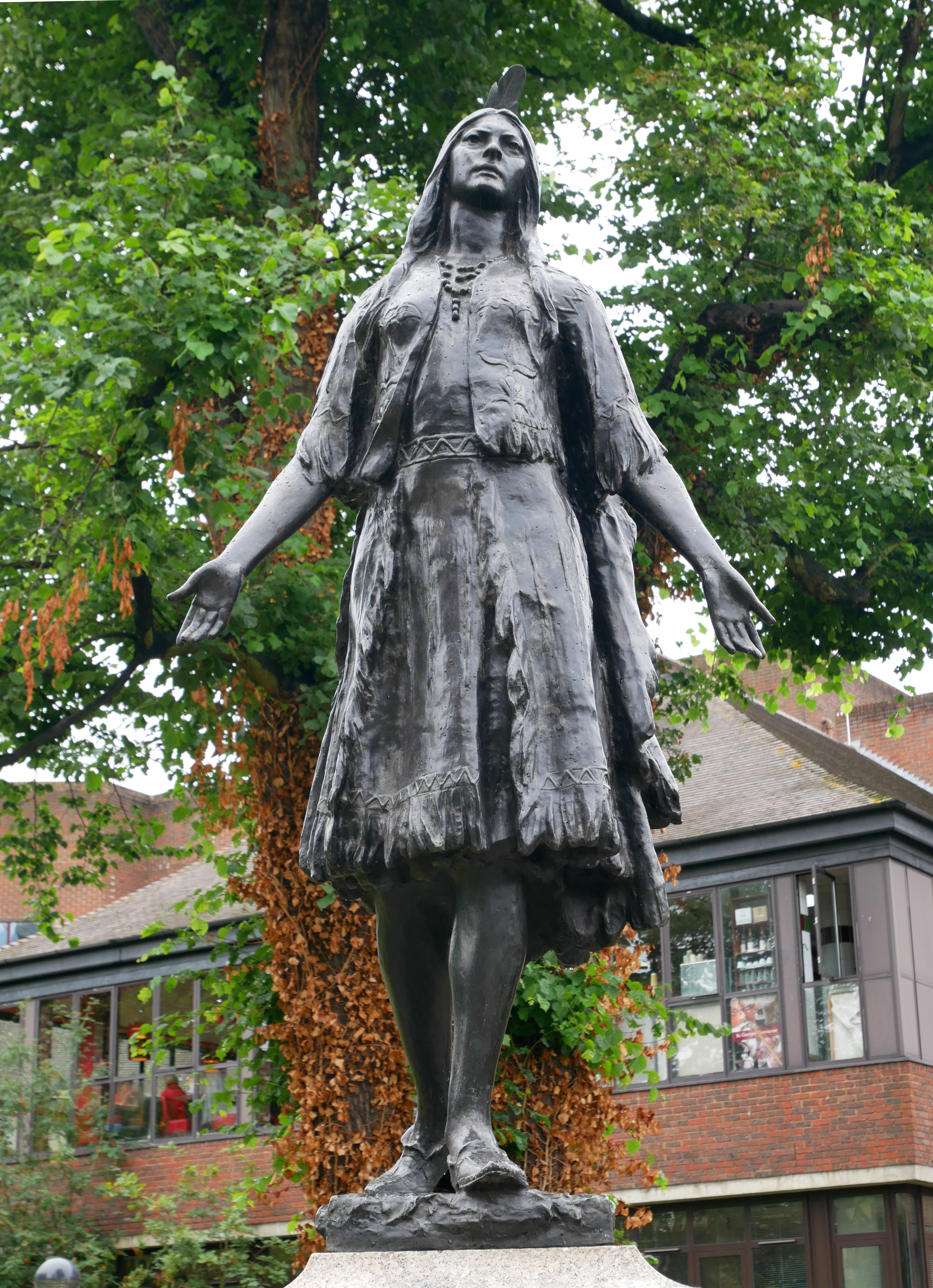
Pocahantas (ca. 1906, this cast 1958), Gravesend, Great Britain

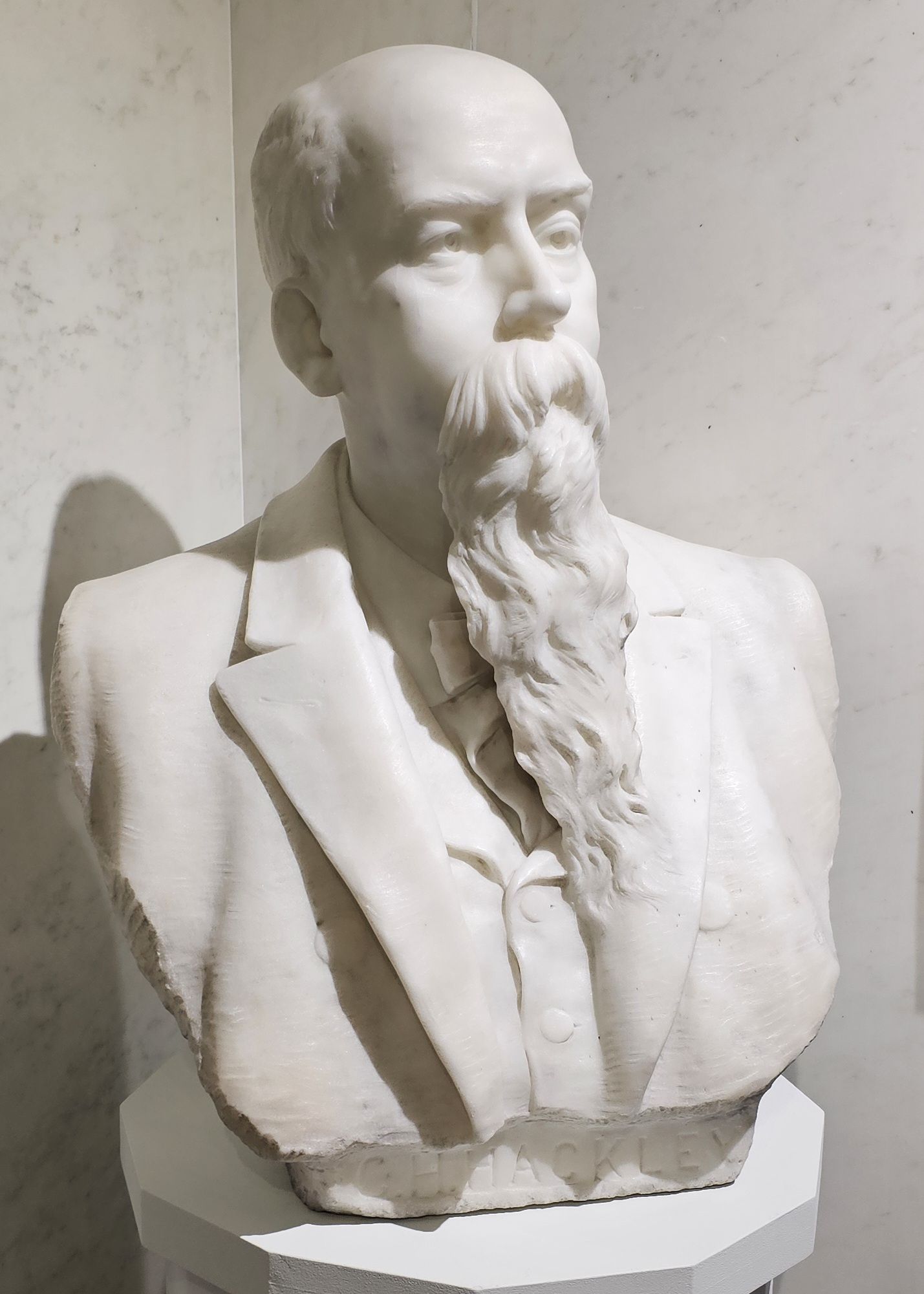
Bust of Charles H. Hackley (1890), Muskegon Museum of Art, Muskegon, Michigan

=== Portrait busts ===
- Nearing Home (plaster, 1887), original unlocated. This bust of a 101-year-old woman was Partridge's first popular success. (Note: "As the work on the clay progressed, if at any time there was a delay and if the bust did not approach completion as fast as she thought it might, the old woman would say to the sculptor, 'You must hurry, Willie,—you must hurry; you mind I'm nearing home.' From this the bust received its name, 'Nearing Home'.")
  - Nearing Home (marble, 1892), Smithsonian American Art Museum, Washington, D.C. Exhibited at the 1893 World's Columbian Exposition in Chicago.
- Bust of Benjamin Franklin (bronze, c.1891), The Franklin Trust Company, Brooklyn, New York City
- Bust of Reverend Edward Everett Hale (bronze, 1891), Union League Club of Chicago, Illinois Exhibited at the 1893 World's Columbian Exposition in Chicago.
  - Replicas at Brooklyn Museum, Cosmos Club (Washington, D.C.), and elsewhere.
- Madonna in Her Maturity (marble, 1892), Dayton Arts Institute, Dayton, Ohio. Exhibited at the 1893 World's Columbian Exposition in Chicago.
  - A marble replica is at Brooklyn Museum
- Bust of William Wood (bronze, 1895), Pennsylvania Academy of the Fine Arts, Philadelphia, Pennsylvania
- Head of Peace (marble, c.1898), Metropolitan Museum of Art, Manhattan, New York City
- Bust of Alfred, Lord Tennyson (bronze, by 1899), Smithsonian American Art Museum, Washington, D.C.
- Bust of Percy Bysshe Shelly (plaster, 1899), Smithsonian American Art Museum, Washington, D.C.
- Bust of Admiral Robert E. Peary (bronze, c.1899), Bowdoin College Museum of Art, Brunswick, Maine
- Bust of George Washington (bronze, c.1900), Metropolitan Republican Club, Manhattan, New York City
  - A bronze replica is at Sulgrave Manor, Oxfordshire, England, the Washington Family's ancestral home.
- Bust of Captain William Clark (bronze, 1903-1904), William Clark Memorial, Bellefontaine Cemetery, St. Louis, Missouri
- Bust of William Colford Schermerhorn (bronze, 1904), Schermerhorn Hall, Columbia University, Manhattan, New York City
- Bust of Sarah Baker Hester (marble, 1905), Brooklyn Museum, New York City
- Bust of Abraham Lincoln (bronze, 1906), Lincoln Club of New York City
- Bust of Dr. Silas Weir Mitchell (marble, 1910), College of Physicians of Philadelphia, Pennsylvania
  - Bronze replicas at Yale University School of Medicine, and Bar Harbor Historical Society, Bar Harbor, Maine.
- Bust of Rear Admiral Robert E. Peary (bronze, 1912), Bowdoin College Museum of Art, Brunswick, Maine
- Bust of Chief-Justice Melville W. Fuller (marble, 1914), United States Supreme Court Building, Washington, D.C.
  - A bronze replica is in Fuller Park, Chicago, Illinois.
- Bust of John Howard Van Amringe (bronze, 1917-1918), Van Amringe Memorial, Columbia University, Manhattan, New York City
- Bust of Theodore Roosevelt (bronze, 1919), Metropolitan Republican Club, Manhattan, New York City
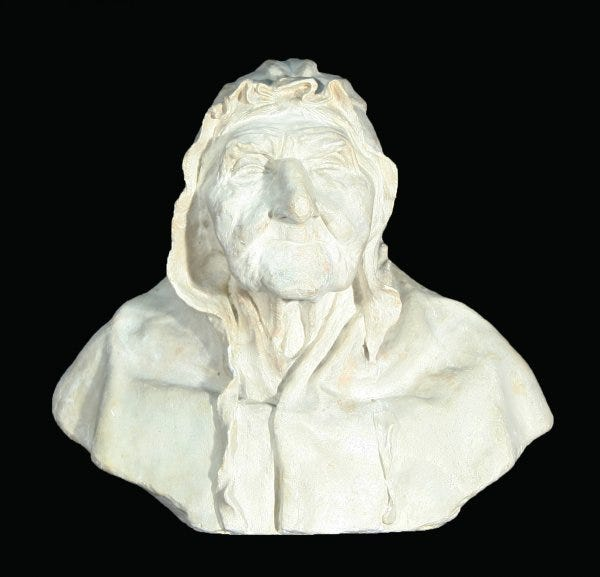
Nearing Home (1887), original plaster unlocated

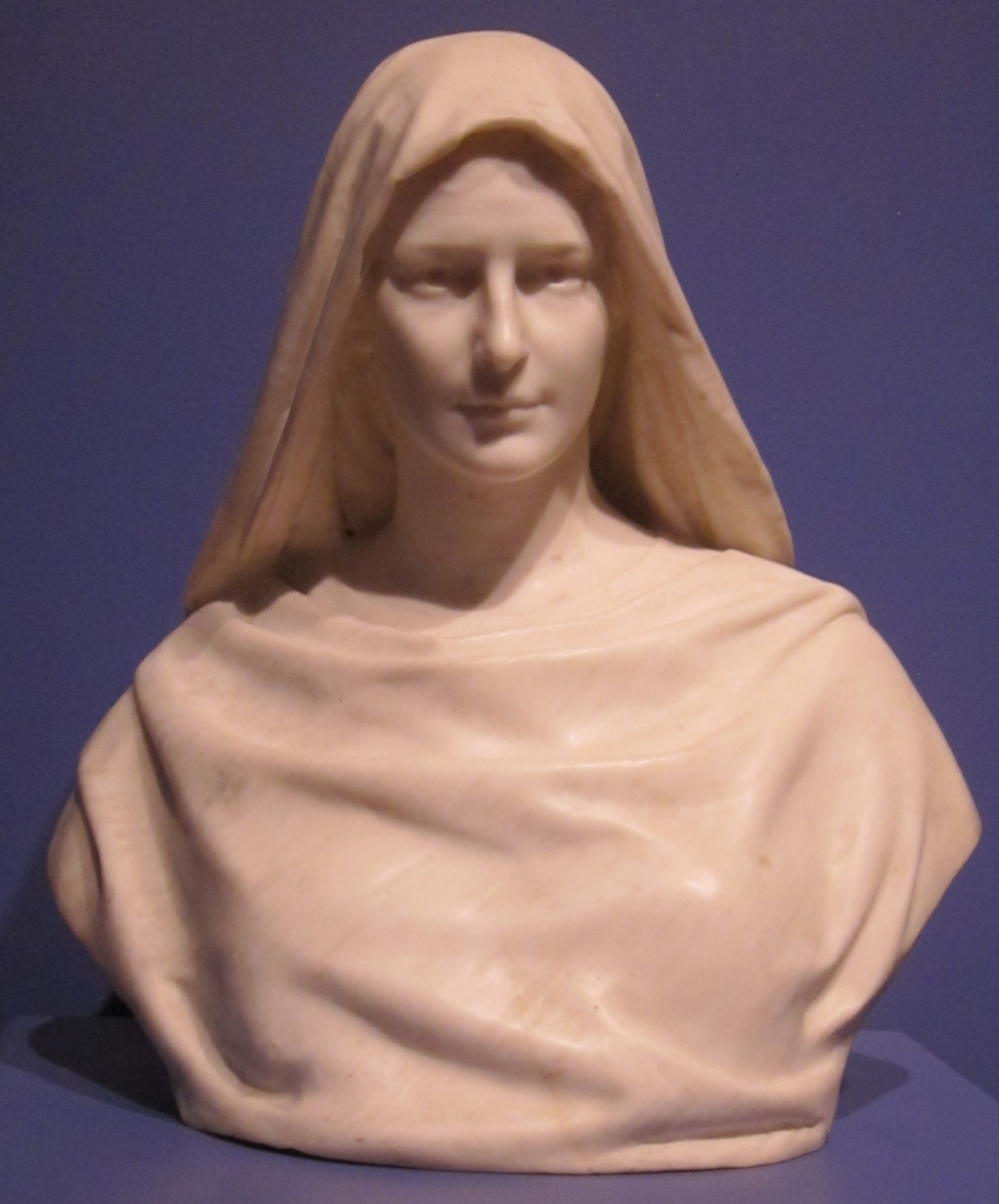
Madonna in Her Maturity (1892), Dayton Art Institute, Ohio

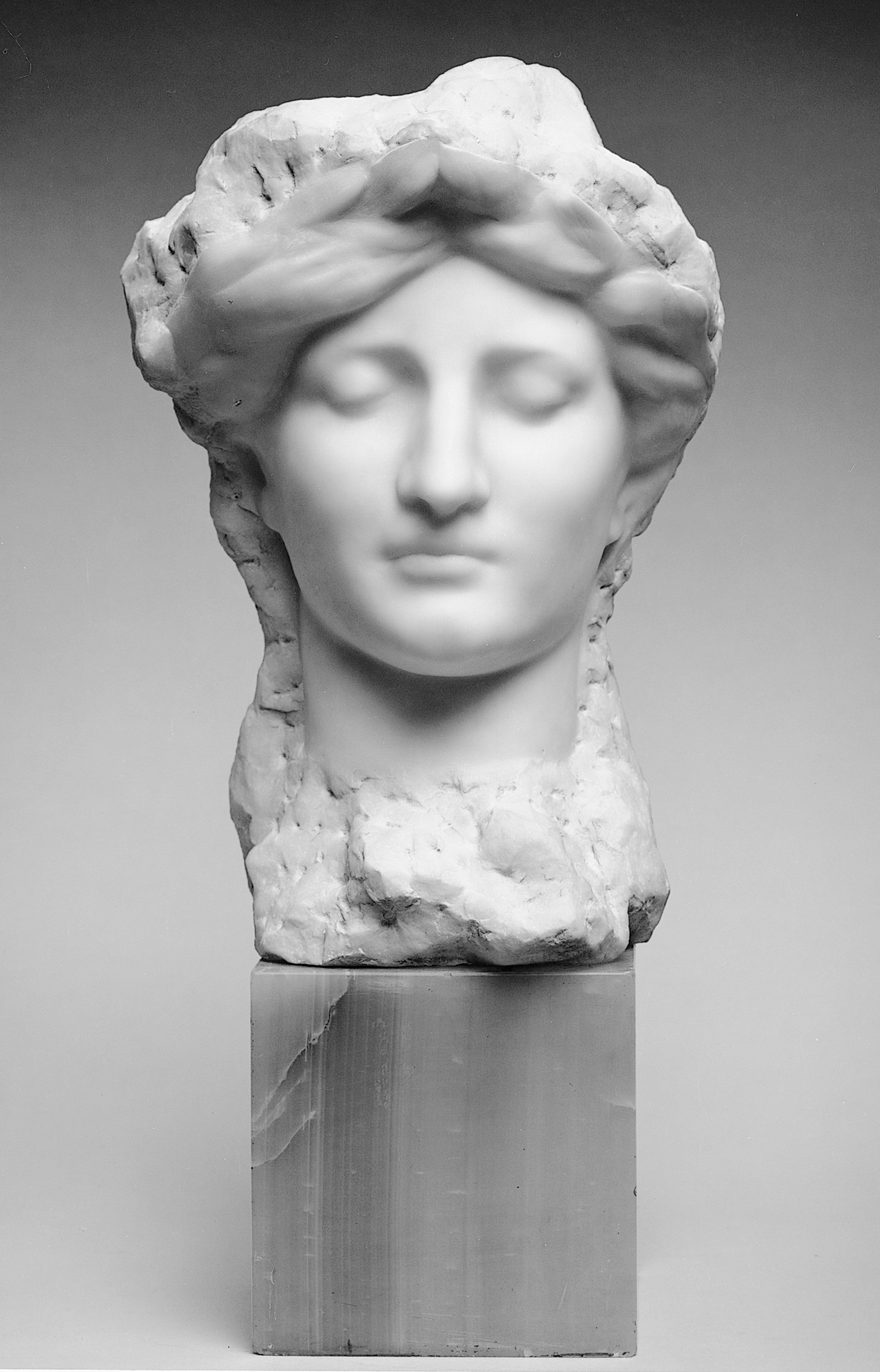
Head of Peace (ca. 1898), Metropolitan Museum of Art, New York City

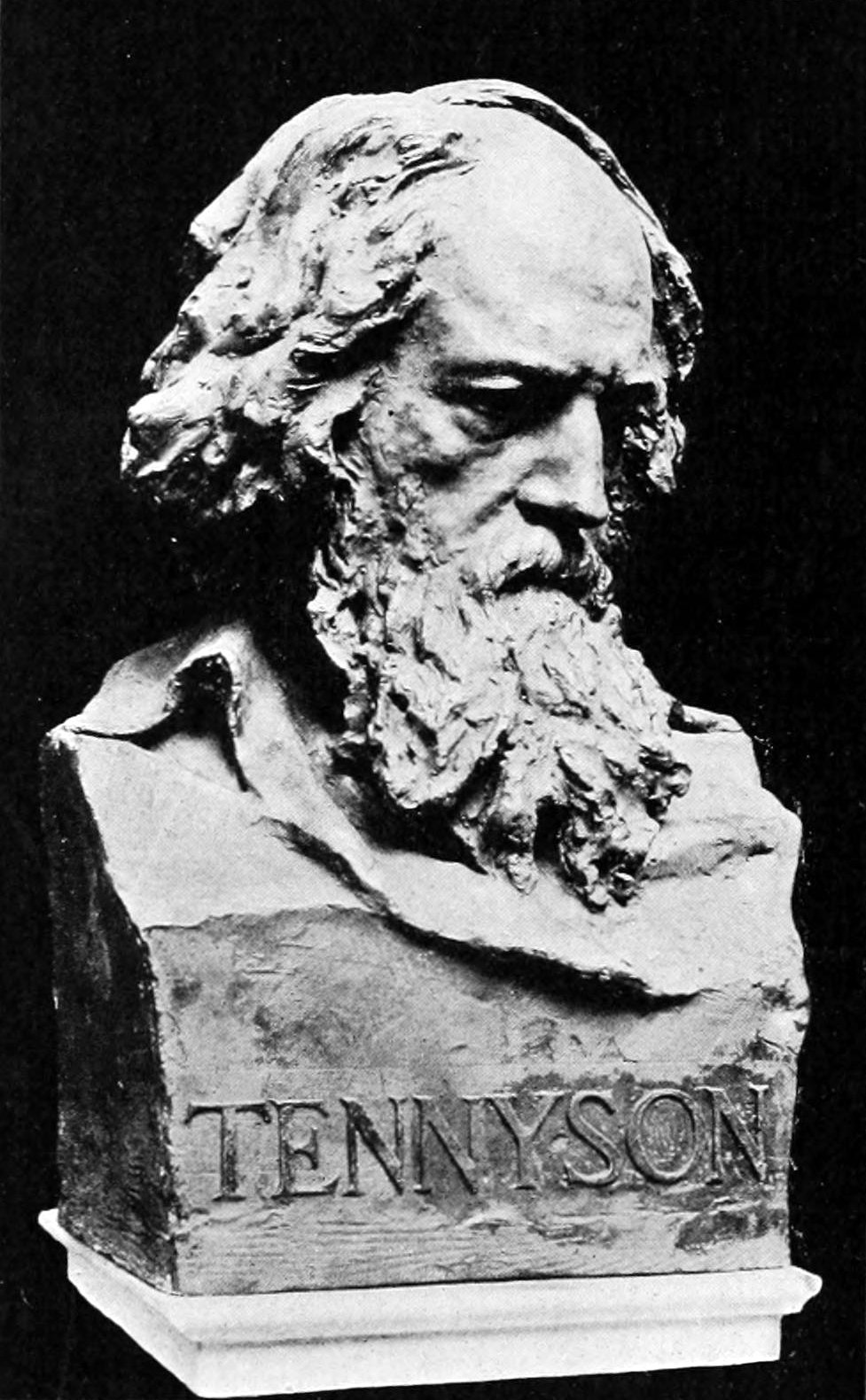
Alfred Lord Tennyson (by 1899), Smithsonian American Art Museum, Washington, D.C.

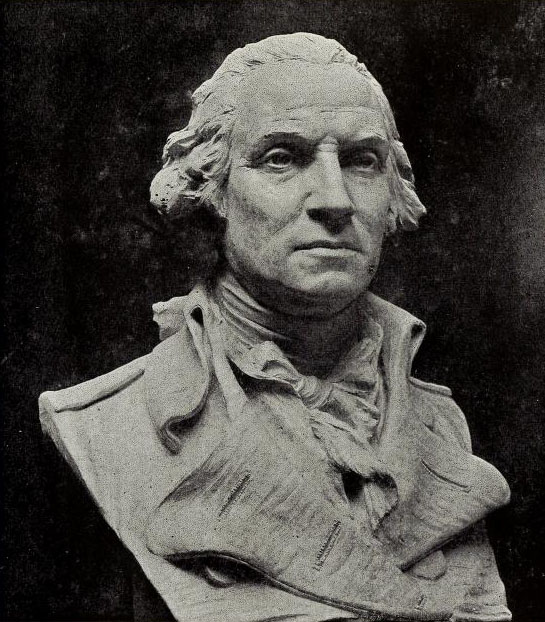
George Washington (ca.1900), Sulgrave Manor, Oxfordshire, UK

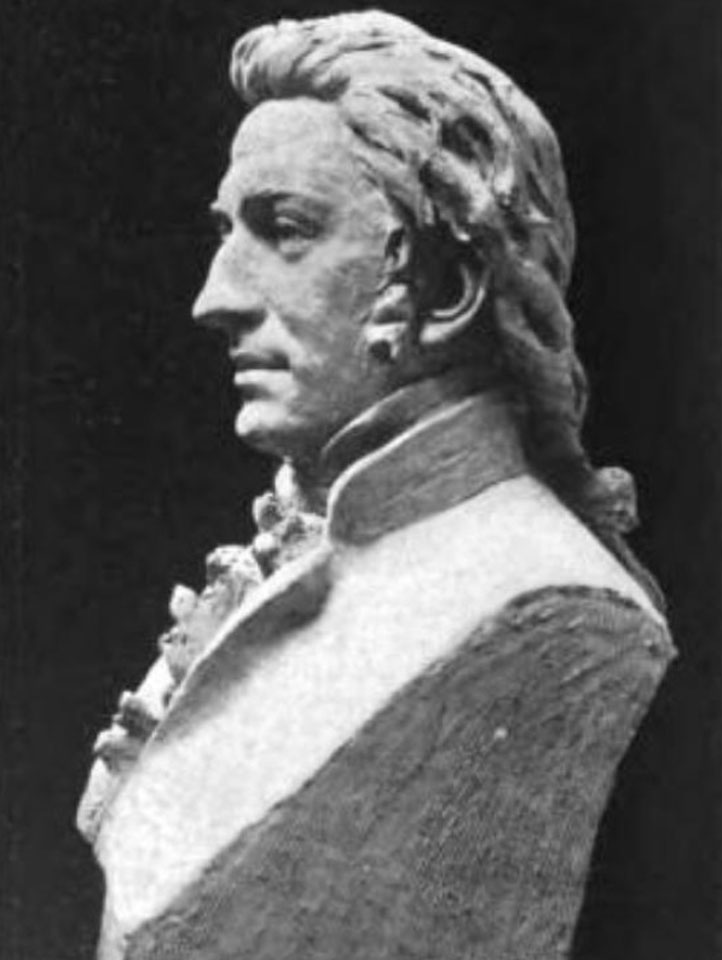
Captain William Clark (1904), William Clark Memorial, St. Louis, Missouri

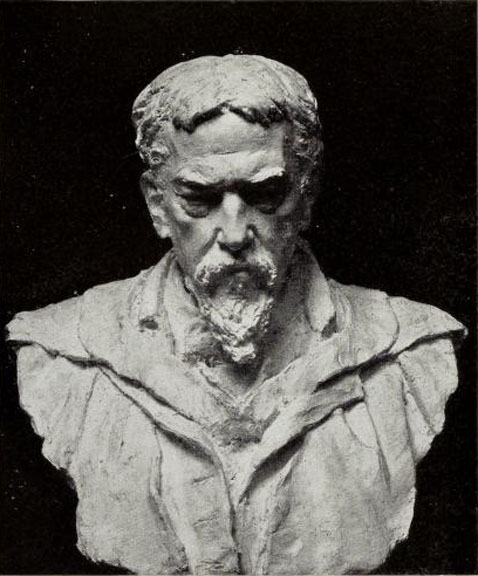
Dr. Silas Weir Mitchell (1910), Philadelphia College of Physicians, Pennsylvania

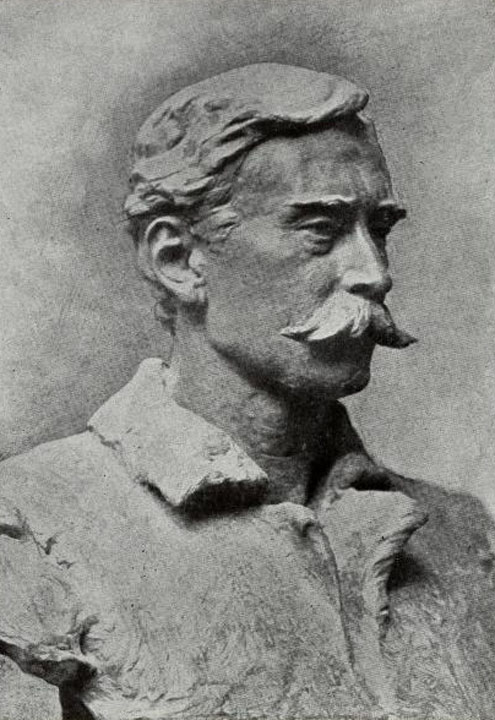
Rear Admiral Robert E. Peary (1912), Bowdoin College Museum of Art, Maine

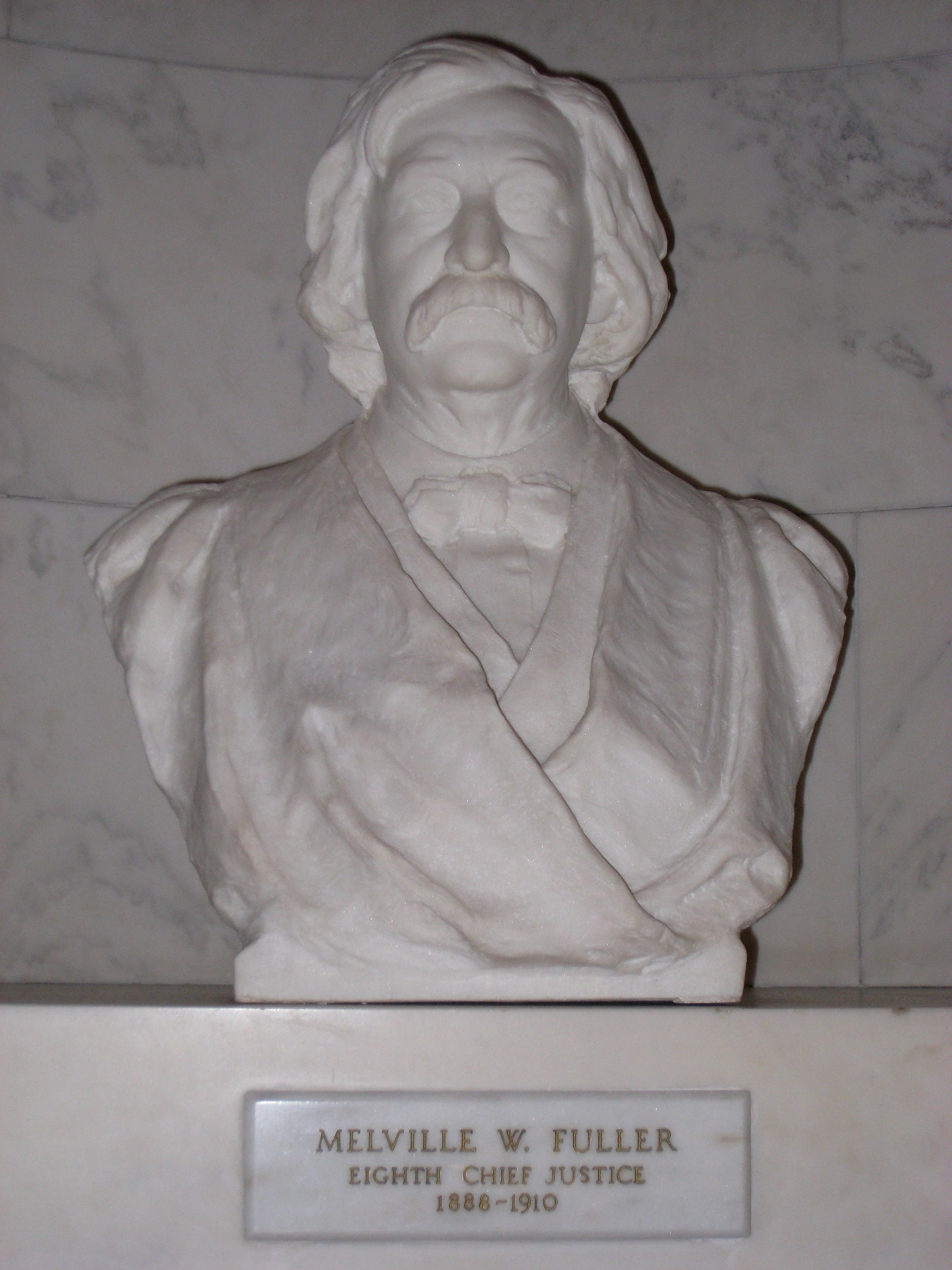
Chief Justice Melville W. Fuller (1914), U.S. Supreme Court, Washington, D.C.

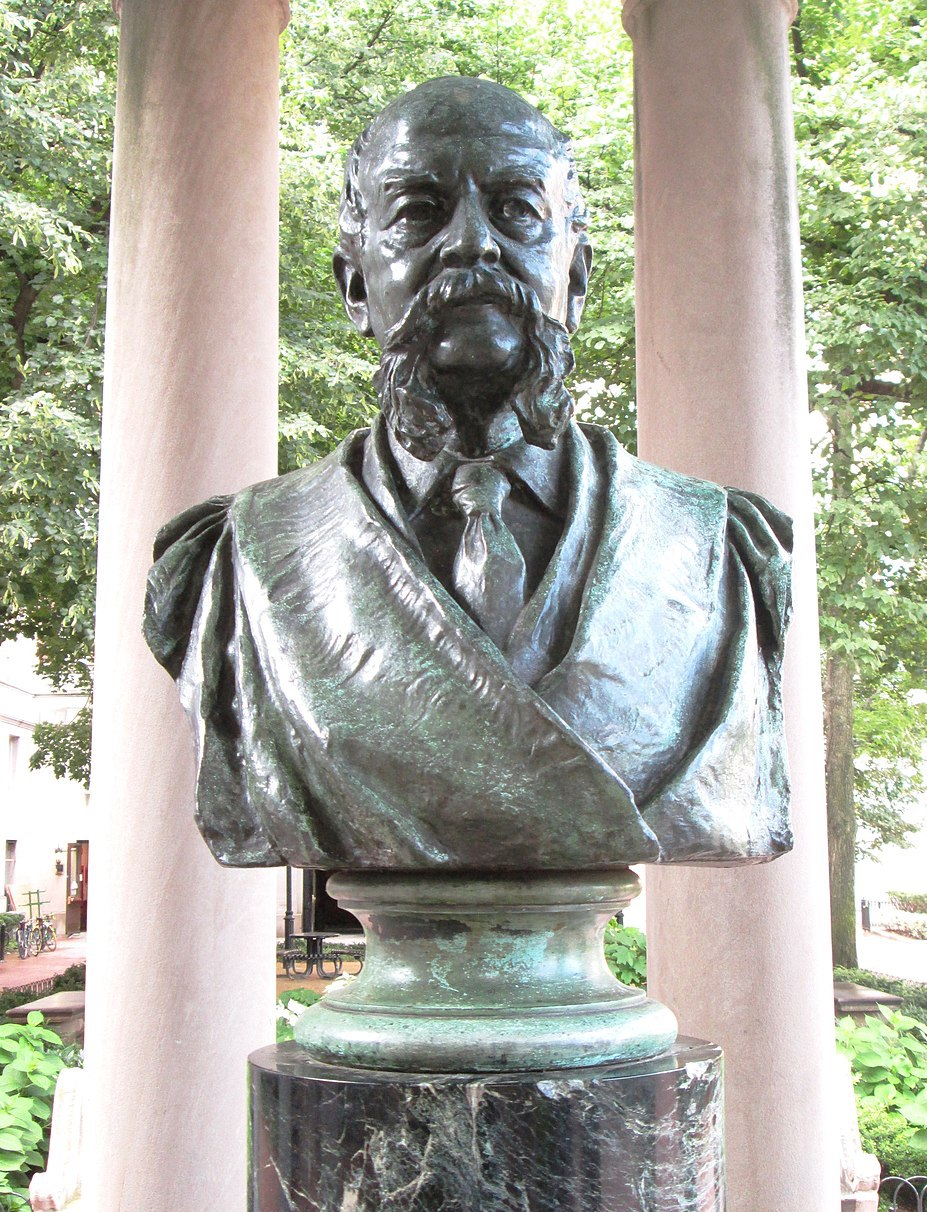
John Howard Van Amringe (1918), Columbia University, New York City

=== Bas reliefs ===
- Midsummer Night's Dream (marble, 1892), Smithsonian American Art Museum, Washington, D.C. Exhibited at the 1893 World's Columbian Exposition in Chicago.
- Head of Garrick Mallery (bronze, 1898), Mallery Monument, Arlington National Cemetery, Arlington, Virginia
- James Smithson Memorial Tablet (bronze, 1896), Smithsonian Institution, Washington, D.C. Created for Smithson's gravesite in Genoa, Italy, the bronze original was stolen, and replaced in 1900 with a marble copy.
  - An 1896 bronze replica was given to the Chapel of the Holy Spirit, Genoa, Italy. This was destroyed during World War II, and replaced in 1963 with a marble copy.
  - An 1898 bronze replica was given Smithson's alma mater, Pembroke College, University of Oxford, England.
- 8 panels from the life of Christ (marble, 1902-1904), Jordan Font, National Cathedral, Washington, D.C.
- Elias Boudinot Memorial Tablet (bronze, 1903), Nassau Hall, Princeton University, New Jersey
- The Last Supper (marble, 1907), Church of the Epiphany (over altar), Washington, D.C.
- Head of Abraham Lincoln (bronze, 1909), Lincoln Memorial, Nay Org Park, Scranton, Pennsylvania
- 24 "Hours of the Day" panels (bronze, 1914), Class of 1885 Sundial, College Walk, Columbia University, Manhattan, New York City. The sundial was designed by Charles Follen McKim, of McKim, Mead & White, and featured a 16-ton green granite sphere that cast a shadow on a circular dial. The sphere cracked and was removed in the 1940s. Only the dial's base, encircled by Partridge's decorative panels, survives.
- Mother and Children (bronze, 1915), Charles T. How Memorial, Woodbury Park, Bar Harbor, Maine
- Anne's Tablet (bronze, 1916), Constance Fenimore Woolson Memorial, Mackinac Island State Park, Mackinac Island, Michigan
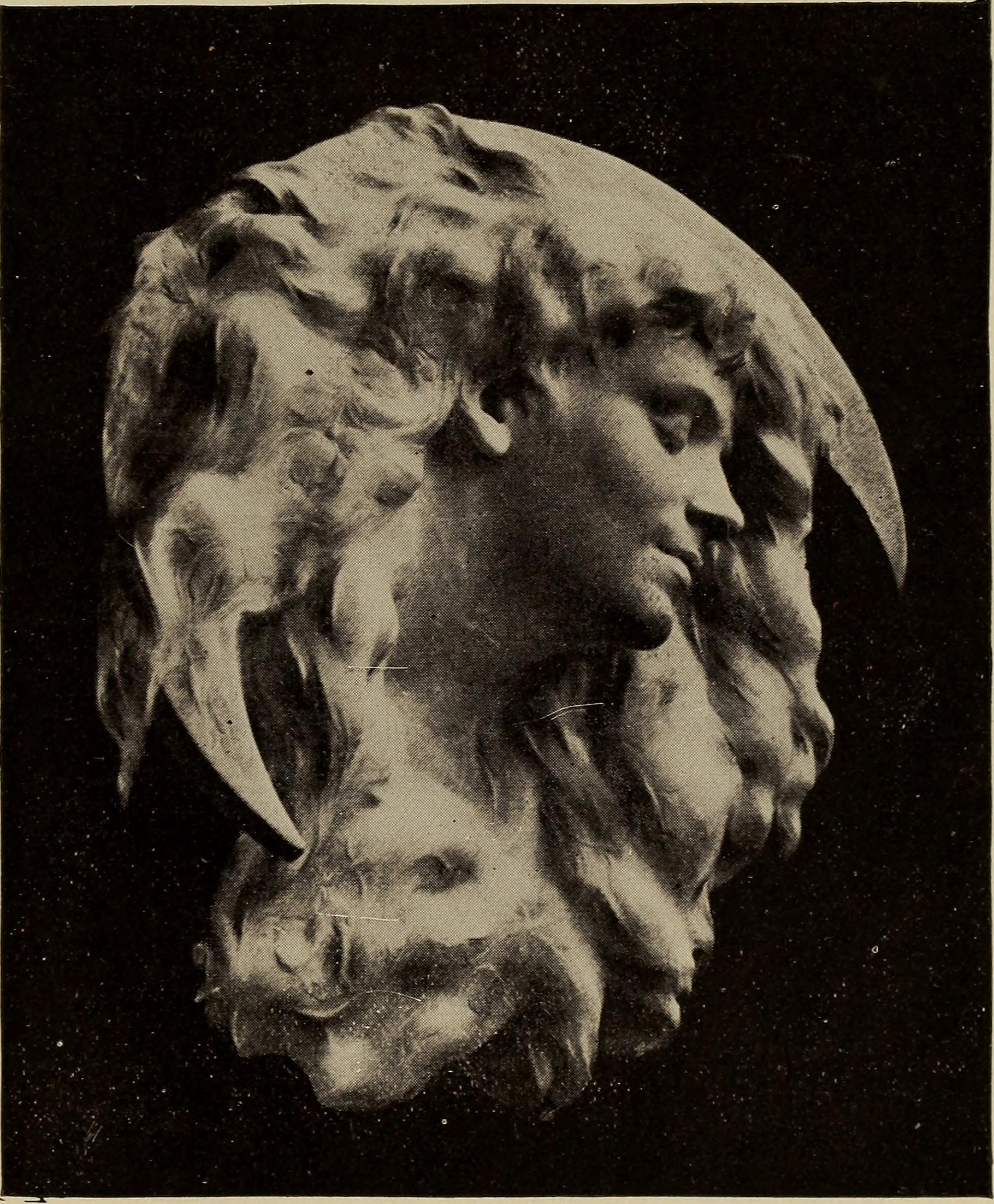
Midsummer Night's Dream (1892), Smithsonian American Art Museum, Washington, D.C.

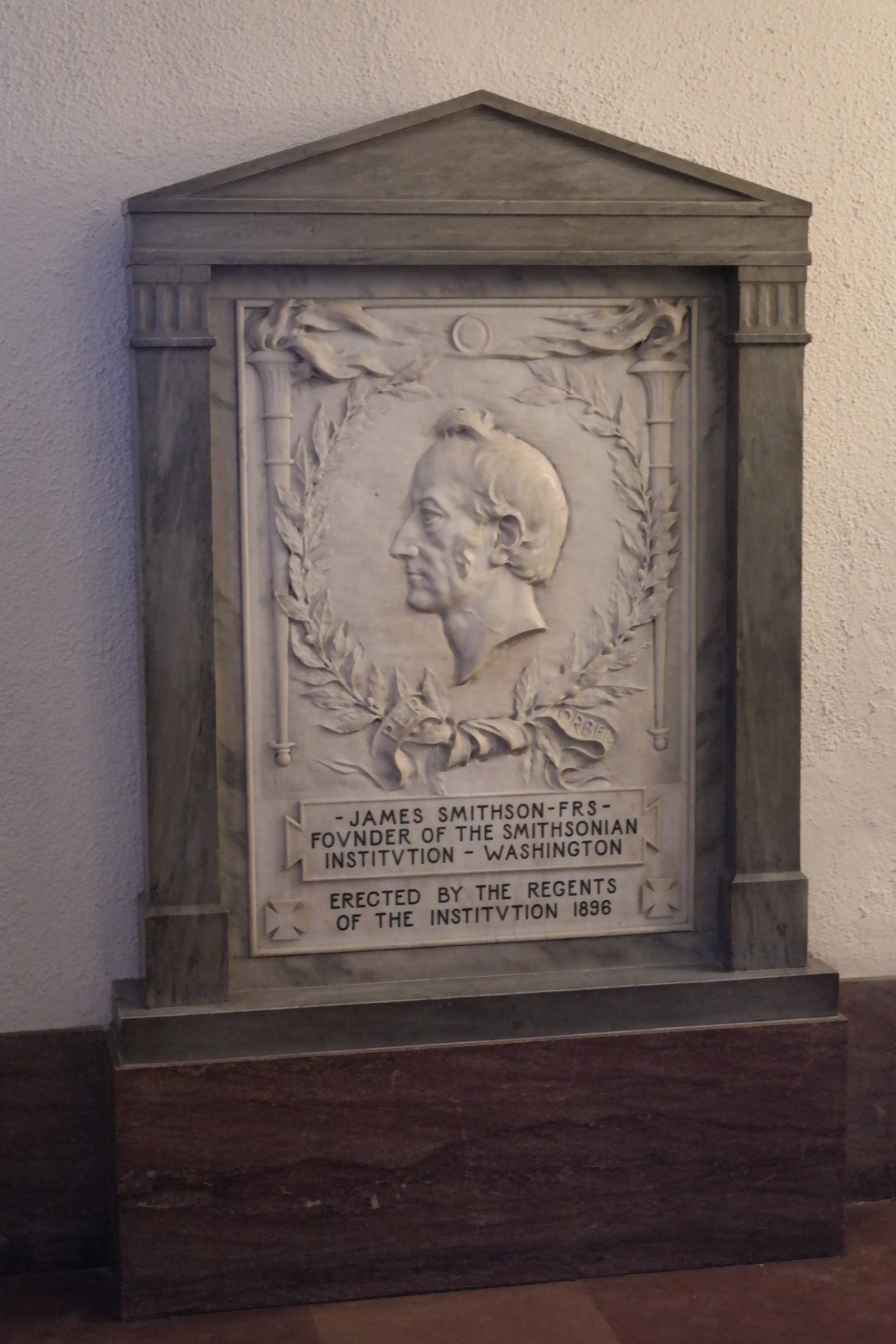
James Smithson Memorial Tablet (1900), Smithsonian Institution, Washington, D.C.

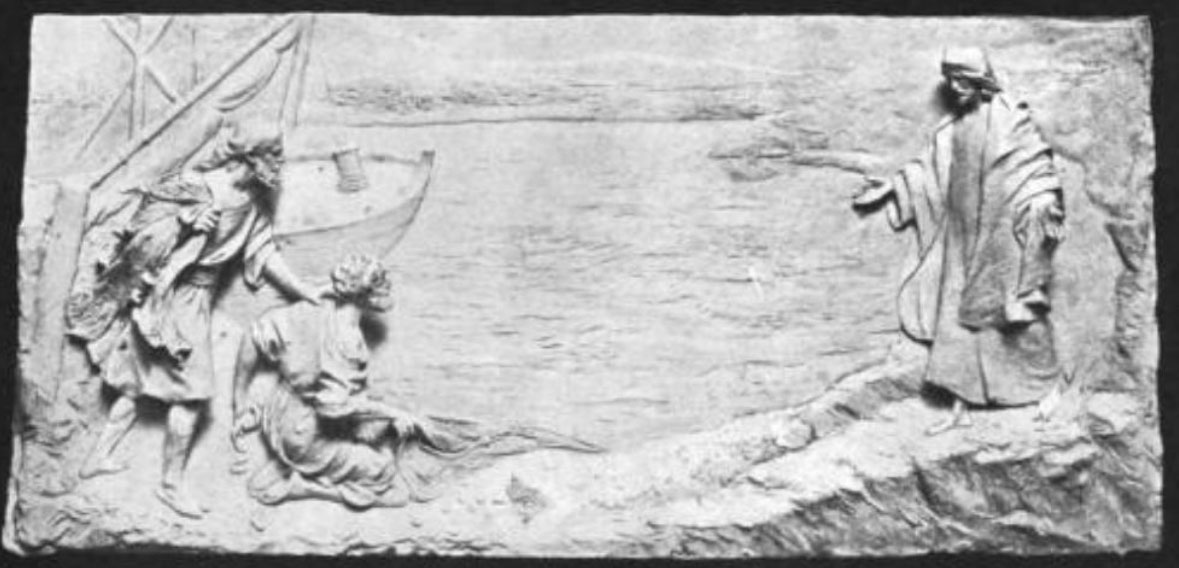
Calling of the Apostles panel, Jordan Font (1904), Washington National Cathedral

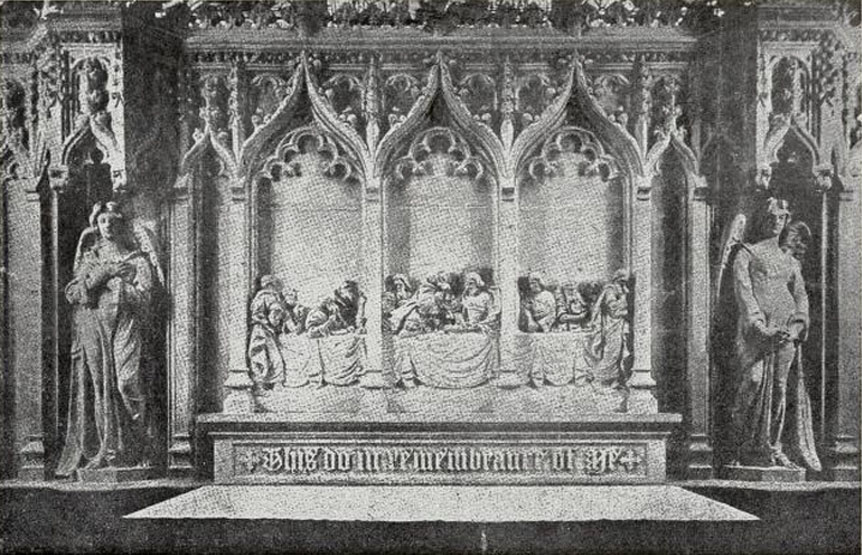
The Last Supper (1907), Church of the Epiphany, Washington, D.C.

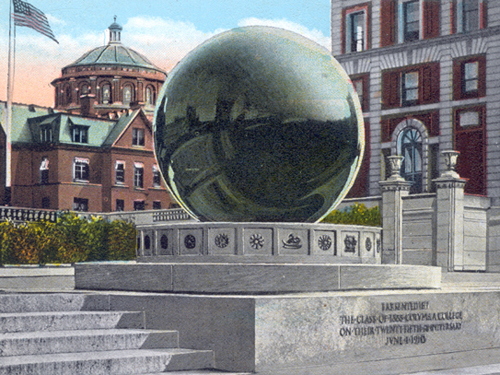
Class of 1885 Sundial (1914), Columbia University, New York City

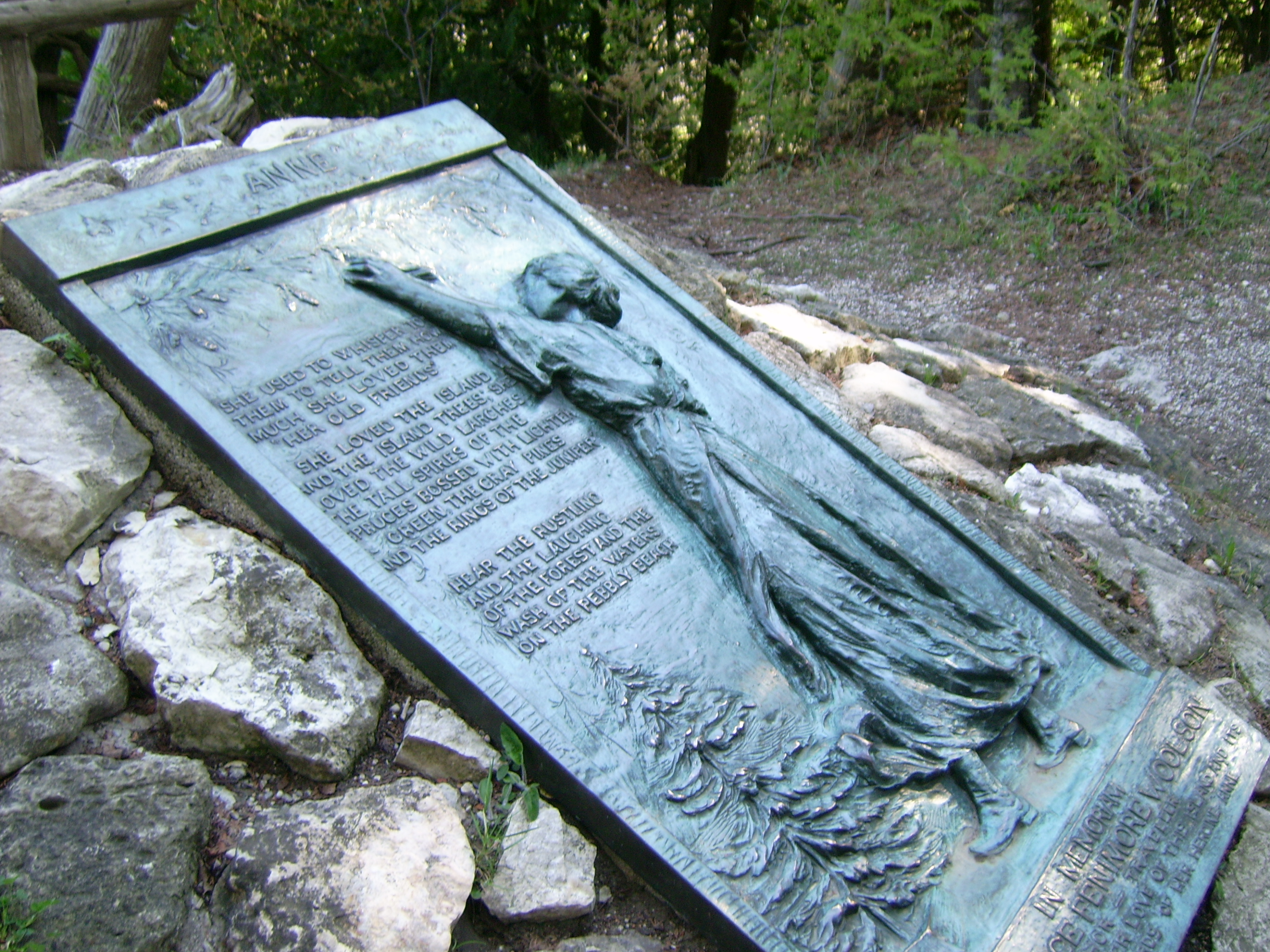
Anne's Tablet (1916), Mackinac Island, Michigan

=== Other works ===
- Temporary sculpture: Admiral David Farragut (staff, 1899; demolished 1900), attic figure of Dewey Arch, Madison Square, Manhattan, New York City
- Group: Homer Reciting the Iliad (bronze, 1900), Art Institute of Chicago, Illinois Width: 43.25 in (109.9 cm)
- Statuette: General Grant as President (bronze, 1900), Minneapolis Institute of Art, Minnesota Height: 21 in (53 cm)
- Architectural sculpture: Entrance Portal (marble, 1904), Henry W. Poor House, Tuxedo, New York, T. Henry Randall, architect
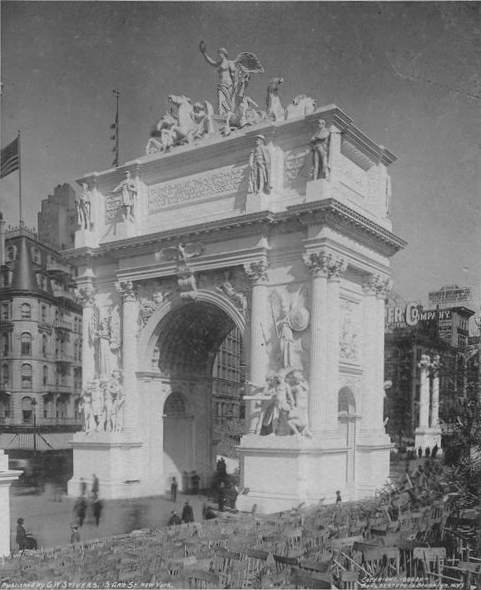
Dewey Arch (staff 1899), Madison Square, New York City, demolished 1900

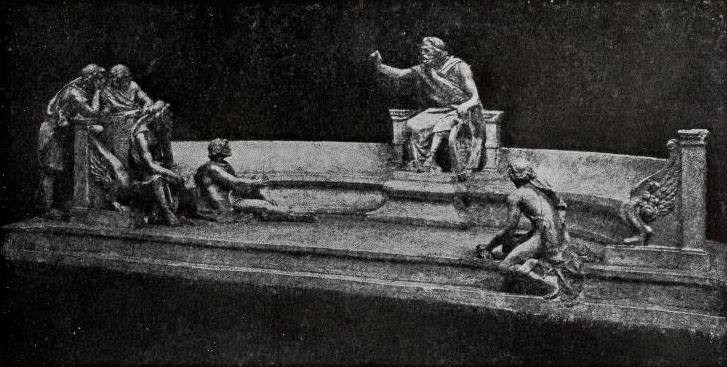
Homer Reciting the Iliad (1900), Art Institute of Chicago, Illinois

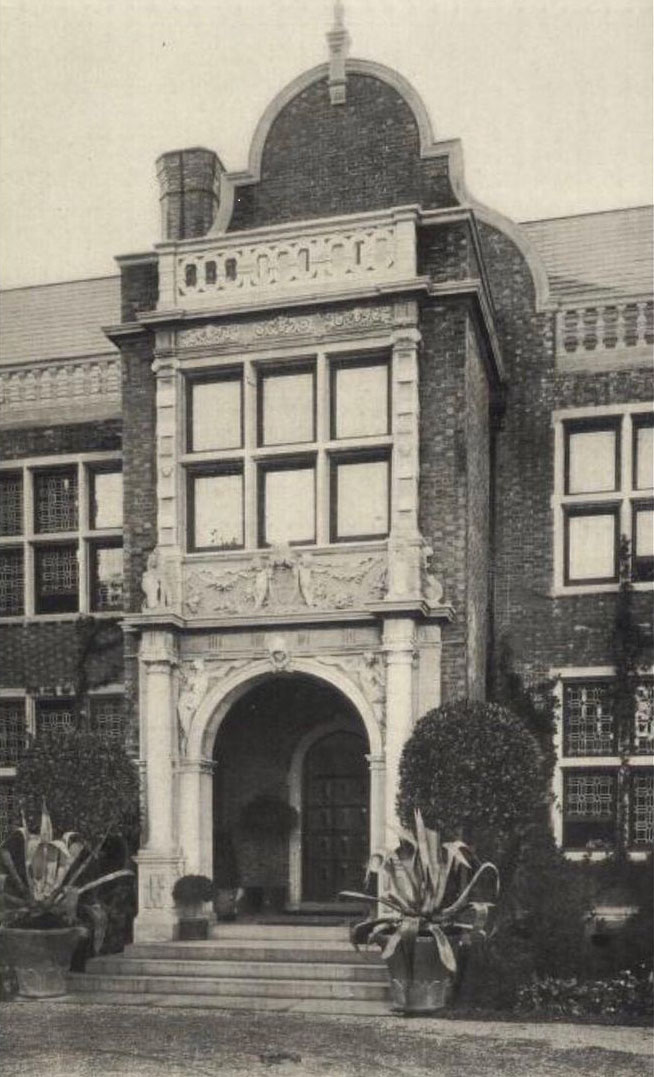
Entrance Portal (1904) Henry W. Poor House, Tuxedo, New York

== Writings ==
Partridge's published writings include articles on aesthetics, books on art history, and a manual on sculpting. He published two volumes of poetry, and three verse novels:

- Poetry:
  - The Song-Life of a Sculptor (1894)
  - Sonnets and Lyrics (1902)
- Fiction:
  - The Angel of Clay (1900)
  - Nathan Hale: The Ideal Patriot (1902)
  - The Czar's Gift (1906)
- Non-Fiction:
  - Art for America (1894)
  - Technique of Sculpture (1895)
  - The Works in Sculpture of William Ordway Partridge (1914)
- Articles and lectures:
  - "Goethe as a Playwright," in F. B. Sanborn, ed., The Life and Genius of Goethe (Boston: Ticknor and Company, 1886)
  - "The True Education and the False," The Arena (magazine), vol. 9, no. 50 (January, 1894), Boston, MA
  - "Thomas Ball," The New England Magazine, vol. 12, no. 3 (May 1895)
  - "John Rogers, The People's Sculptor," The New England Magazine, vol. 13, no. 6 (February 1896)
  - "The Relation of Art to Religion," The Arena (magazine), vol. 17, no. 85 (December 1896), Boston, MA
  - "Sculpture in Its Relation to Architecture," lecture given at the 33rd Annual Convention, American Institute of Architects, Philadelphia, November 1900
  - "Greek versus Modern Sculpture," Brush and Pencil (magazine), vol. 16, November 1905,

== Affiliations ==
- Architectural League of New York
- National Sculpture Society
- Sons of the American Revolution
- Veteran Corps of Artillery, State of New York
- American Institute of Architects (honorary)
- Royal Society of Arts, London
- He was also a member of the literary and artistic Lotos Club, New York
