= Statue of Alexander Hamilton (Columbia University) =

Statue in Manhattan, New York, U.S.

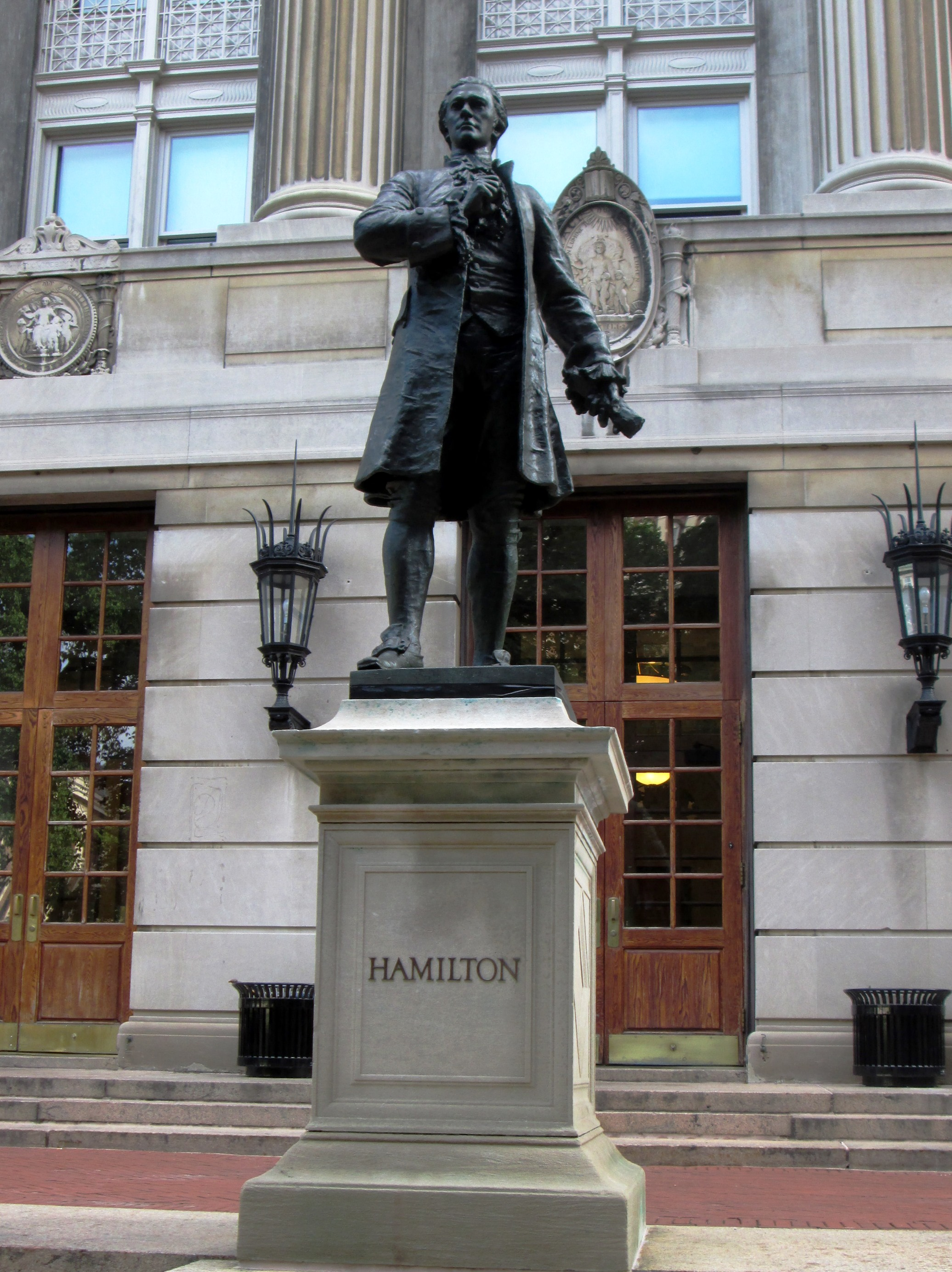
- The sculpture in 2014
- Artist: William Ordway Partridge
- Year: 1908
- Type: Sculpture
- Subject: Alexander Hamilton
- Location: New York City, New York, United States; 40.80672°N 73.96179°W

An outdoor 1908 sculpture of Alexander Hamilton by William Ordway Partridge is installed outside Hamilton Hall on the Columbia University campus in Manhattan, New York, United States.

== See also ==
- 1908 in art
