= Columbia University sundial =

Former sundial at Columbia University

Coordinates: 40°48′26.2″N 73°57′45.1″W

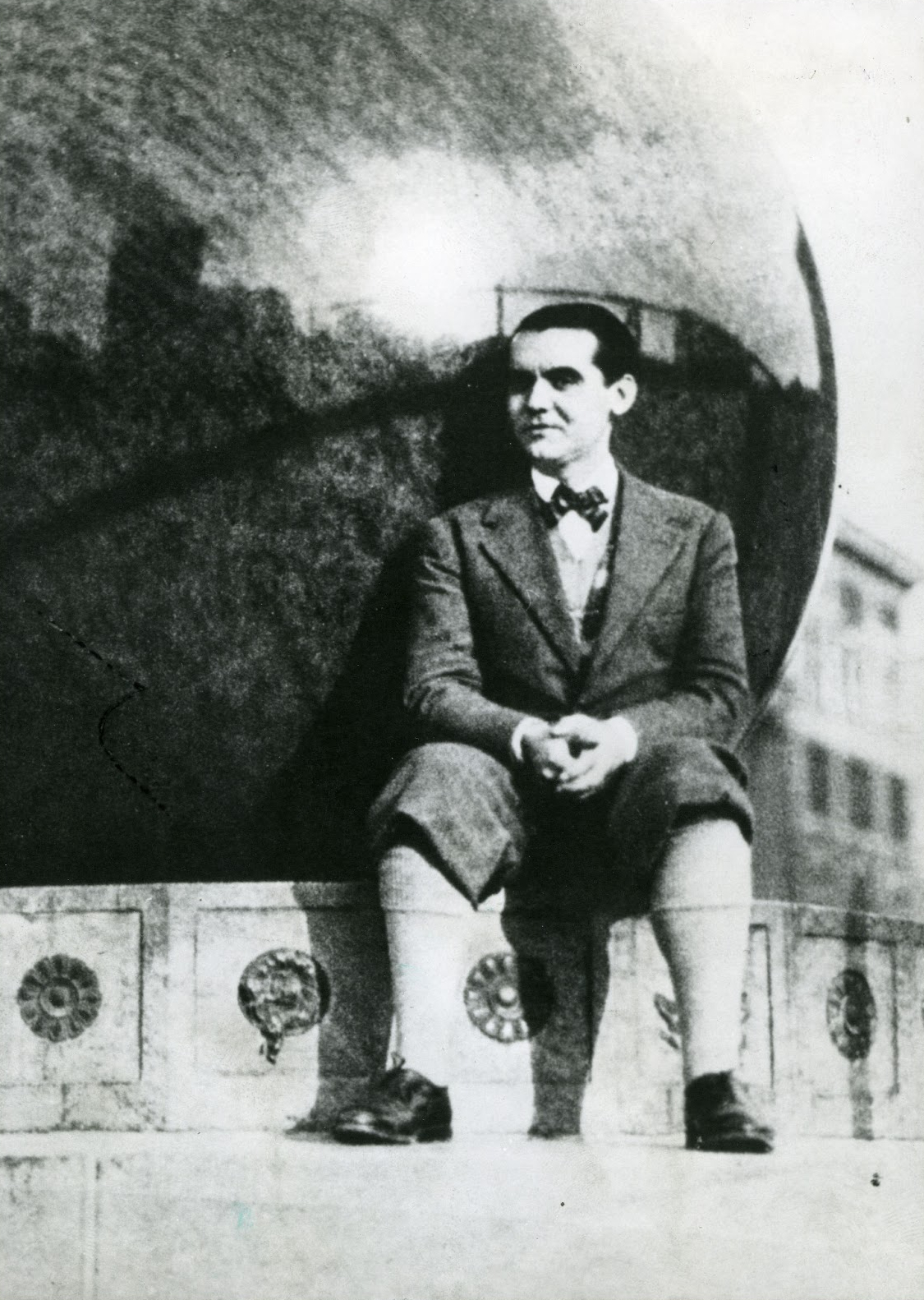
Spanish playwright Federico García Lorca posing before the sundial as a student in 1929

The Class of 1885 Memorial Sundial is a landmark at Columbia University, located at the center of the College Walk at the other end of Butler Plaza from Butler Library. Designed by astronomy professor Harold Jacoby in conjunction with McKim, Mead & White, it was completed in 1914. The 16-short-ton (15 t) granite sphere that once sat on top of it, at some point considered the largest stone sphere in the world, was removed in 1946 after it began to crack; efforts have been made toward its recovery since it was rediscovered in Michigan in 2001. The sundial's bare platform now serves as a popular meeting area for students, as well as a center for campus politics.

== History ==
=== Design and construction ===
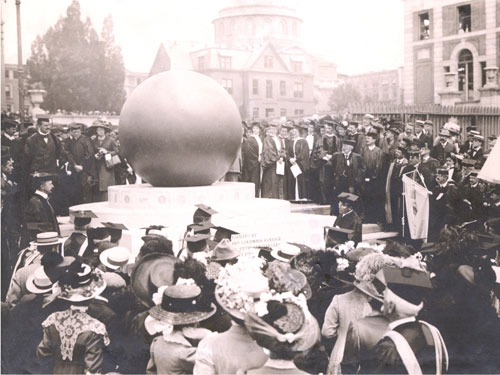
The first dedication of the sundial in 1910

The sundial was originally topped with a 16-short-ton (15 t) dark-green granite sphere, dubbed the "Sunball", which served as its gnomon. The stone was sourced from Mount Ascutney in Vermont, from a quarry that was reportedly "well-loved by a group from the class of 1885". The sphere was the third of its kind made, after the first two were rejected for having cracks.

Originally planned by McKim, Mead & White to be purely ornamental, astronomy professor Harold Jacoby suggested that it be presented on behalf of the class of 1885 as a sundial, as a gift that would both be aesthetically pleasing as well as "possess a distinct educational value". It was intended to be placed in the center of 116th Street, which at that point had not yet been sectioned off by the university, to serve as a "haven of rest" for students walking across campus; after objections from the New York City government against placing a 7 ft (2.1 m) tall sphere in the middle of a busy street, it was moved to the side of the road in front of Butler Plaza, which was then the college's football field.

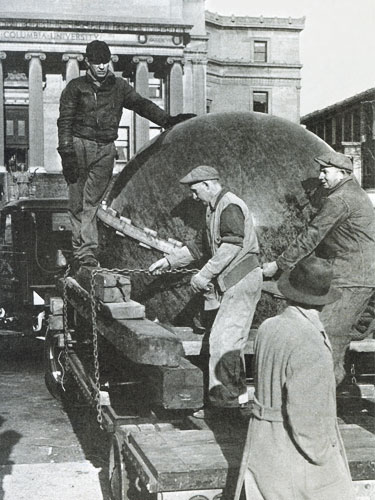
Workers removing the Sunball, 1946

A plaster model of the sundial was presented to the university by the class of 1885 in June 1910 to mark its 25th anniversary, and construction on the actual monument began shortly thereafter. It was completed and presented a second time on May 26, 1914. In total, the installation cost around $10,000. A contemporary university publication claimed that the Sunball was the largest stone sphere on Earth.

=== Removal and rediscovery ===
A crack in the Sunball was discovered in 1944, which continued to grow until 1946, when the university found it too unsafe to remain. The university attempted to hold the sphere together, first by inserting a bronze rod into it and then with an "unsightly iron band", before erecting a chicken-wire fence around the sundial and removing it altogether in December 1946. At the time, it was reported to have been broken into pieces and sent to a stone yard in the Bronx.

However, the Sunball was rediscovered intact in a field near Ann Arbor, Michigan in 2001; the owner of the field had inherited it from an unknown Columbia affiliate. Efforts have been made by students to recover the Sunball, though concerns around costs as well as the wish to preserve the bare pedestal's role as a "free speech corner" on campus have prevented its return.

Diego Rivera addresses protesters at the sundial, May 1933. Frida Kahlo was also present.

The sundial has been noted as a meeting area for students, as well as a site of frequent protests. Since the removal of the Sunball, its pedestal has become a popular location for protesting students to make speeches—so popular that, during the turbulent 1960s, the university banned for a period the use of microphones and amplifiers to address students at sundial rallies. Notably, the Columbia University protests of 1968 began at the sundial, where Mark Rudd addressed several hundred students at a rally on April 23, 1968, before they marched up to Low Memorial Library and occupied Hamilton Hall. In the early 1970s, the sundial was the site of frequent political effigy-burnings; victims included university presidents Andrew W. Cordier (1970) and William J. McGill (1973), Richard Nixon (1972, 1974), and South Vietnamese President Nguyễn Văn Thiệu (1975).

In addition to more recent protests, the sundial has also been used for candlelight vigils, Shakespeare plays, and several mock sacrifices of virgins.

== Design ==
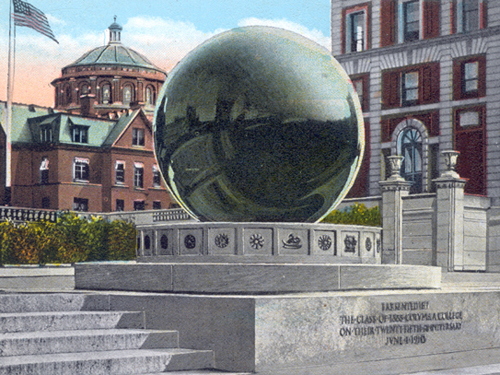
The sundial in the early 20th century, before the gnomon was removed

The pedestal of the sundial is inscribed with the Latin phrase Horam Expecta Veniet ("wait for the hour and it will come"). The twelve brass inserts on the base, designed by alumnus William Ordway Partridge, represent the cycle of the day, and are named, respectively: "Torches of the Morning", "Increase of the Dawn", "Chanticleer", "Sun Rise", "Love Awakening", "Boiling the Pot", "Love Crowning the Hours", "Love at Play", "Love Tempers the Night Wind", "The Evening Star", "Love Piping to the Moon", and "Voices of the Night".

The sundial was designed by Jacoby to show Eastern Standard Time (as opposed to local solar time, as most sundials did). Given the variations between standard and solar time, it was designed to indicate the time only once a day at noon, by noting either edge of the shadow cast by the gnomon on two brass plates on the pedestal that marked off the days of the year: given the date, one could calculate when noon would be, or, at noon, one could figure out the date. It was engineered by Jacoby to be accurate to within a fraction of a minute. The strange functionality of the sundial was often a subject of student confusion; a 1932 article in the Columbia Daily Spectator quipped that the only way to actually tell the time using it was to "stand on the pedestal and look over at the clock between Hartley and Livingston [Wallach Hall]".
