= Alabama literature =

Written works of Alabama

Alabama literature includes the prose fiction, poetry, films and biographies that are set in or created by those from the US state of Alabama. This literature officially began emerging from the state circa 1819 with the recognition of the region as a state. Like other forms of literature from the Southern United States, Alabama literature often discusses issues of race, stemming from the history of the slave society, the American Civil War, the Reconstruction era and Jim Crow laws, and the US Civil Rights Movement. Alabama literature was inspired by the latter's significant campaigns and events in the state, such as the Montgomery Bus Boycott and Selma to Montgomery marches.

Some of the most notable pieces of literature from this region include Harper Lee's novel To Kill A Mockingbird, Winston Groom's novel Forrest Gump, and Fannie Flagg's novel Fried Green Tomatoes at the Whistlestop Cafe. The biographies of Rosa Parks and Martin Luther King Jr. are also highly significant.

== Early accounts (1539-1819) ==
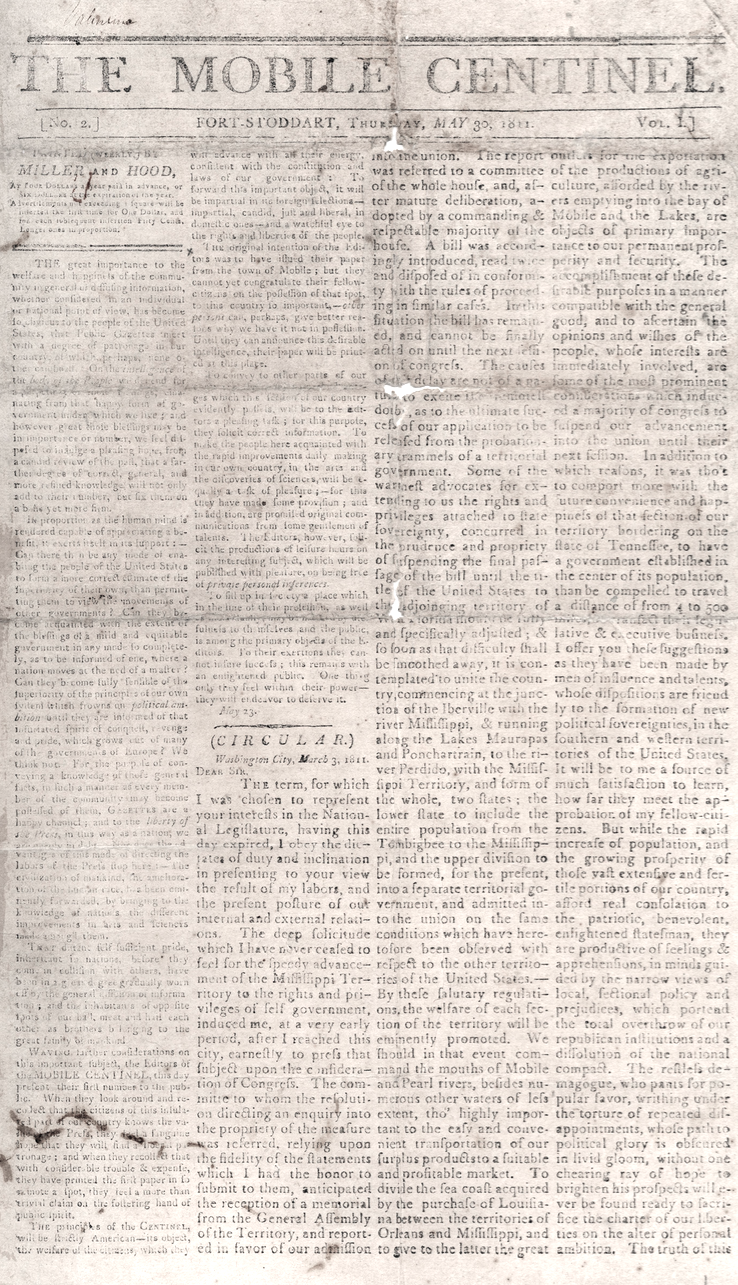
The Mobile Centinel

Early literary works composed in modern-day Alabama were printed elsewhere. For example, members of Hernando de Soto's expedition into the then unknown territory of what is now the Southeastern United States wrote accounts chronicling battles against local chief Tuskaloosa in central Alabama. Written accounts from an unnamed Portuguese author, de Soto's secretary Rodrigo Rangel, and the King's agent Luis Hernandez de Biedma were published in Évora (1557), Madrid (1851), and London (1857) respectively. Because of the detailed journals kept by French colonial carpenter André Pénigaut, which were posthumously published by French historian Pierre Margry in 1883, scholars have called Pénigaut "Alabama's first literary figure". When annexation by the United States appeared imminent, two American publishers, John Hood and Samuel Miller, established Alabama's first newspaper at Fort Stoddert. On May 23, 1811, they began printing The Mobile Centinel. The Madison Gazette began printing in Huntsville, Alabama, one year later. The first standalone work of literature written and published in Alabama was Lewis Sewall's poem, The Last Campaign of Sir John Falstaff the II; or, The Hero of the Burnt-Corn Battle: a Heroi-Comic Poem, a satirical account of the Battle of Burnt Corn.

== Statehood and Antebellum period (1819-1861) ==
From the recognition of Alabama as a state in 1819 to the outbreak of the Civil War in 1861, regional literature in this era contained strong themes of nationalism and discussions of race centered around slavery and the political unrest in the lead-up to the Civil War. Notable works from this period include a history of the state by Albert J Pickett, epic poetry and essays by Alexander Beaufort Meek, including one about the Creek leader Red Eagle; humorist stories of the pioneer era by Johnson J Hooper, and Caroline Lee Hentz.

== Modern (late 19th to mid 20th century) ==
Displaying the conventions of Modernism found in literature throughout the Western world, literature in Alabama was also characterized by themes expressed in the South and other parts of the United States. These included issues of race, in response to disfranchisement of most blacks at the turn of the century, passage of Jim Crow laws in the late 19th century to mid-20th century, and the Civil Rights Movement of the 1960s. Authors also addressed issues of gender and war, in response to the First and Second World Wars, and the Vietnam War.

=== Fiction ===
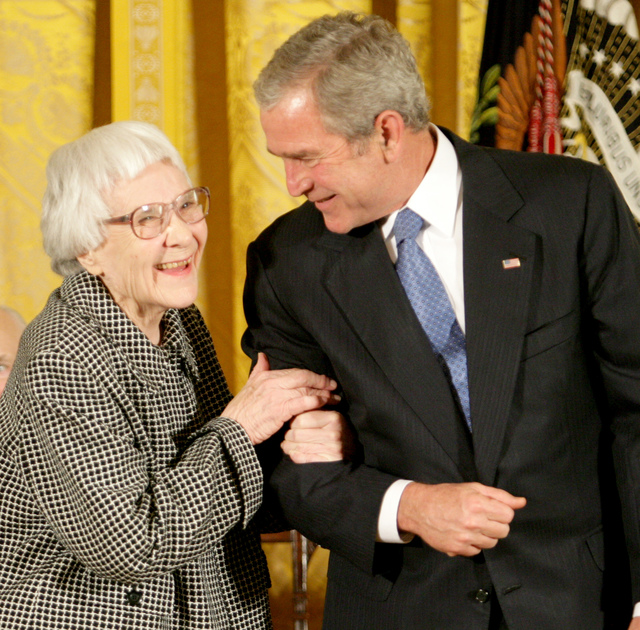
Harper Lee receiving the Presidential Medal of Freedom from President George W Bush

Harper Lee's To Kill a Mockingbird (1960) is widely recognized as the most influential fictional work from Alabama. It continues to be one of the most popular novels in the English language, and has been widely translated. The novel follows the young Scout Finch, a girl being raised with her brother by their widowed father, Atticus Finch, a lawyer in a small town. The children are often treated as outsiders, leading to them to bond with others on the margin, such as neighbor Boo Radley. The central conflict of the novel is when Atticus defends a black man accused of rape of a white woman.

Harper Lee was born in Monroeville, Alabama, in 1926. She was likely influenced by the larger events of this period, but critics believe that material from three specific cases from her youth can be seen in her work. Firstly, the Scottsboro Boys case of 1931 to 1937 in northern Alabama involved eight young black men unjustly accused of rape of a white woman, a 1933 criminal case in Monroeville with significant parallels to the case described in To Kill A Mockingbird, and the confrontation between her father, Amasa Coleman Lee (believed to have inspired the character Atticus), and members of the Ku Klux Klan outside their house in 1934. To Kill a Mockingbird spent 98 weeks on The New York Times Best Seller list, and in 1961, Lee was awarded the Pulitzer Prize. A film adaptation of the same name premiered in 1962 and won three Academy Awards. Go Set a Watchman, a second novel that cast a different perspective on these events, was published in 2015; Lee had had many issues with her health.

Christopher Paul Curtis wrote a young adult novel, The Watsons Go To Birmingham (1963). It tells the story of young Kenny and his family traveling to Alabama during a critical year of the Civil Rights Movement. The novel won an array of awards, including the Newberry Honour Book Award and the Coretta Scott King Honour Book Award for African American Writers.

The Keepers of the House (1964), by Shirley Ann Grau, is a novel about Abigail Howland, the head of a family who is ostracized when it is revealed that her grandfather lived for 30 years with a Black mistress and raised three mixed-race children with her. In response to Grau's writings on interracial marriage, members of the Ku Klux Klan attempted to intimidate her by burning a cross in front of her house. The Keepers of the House won a Pulitzer Prize in 1965.

Joe David Brown's novels were well known for drawing on his life, including his childhood in Birmingham, Alabama, experience as a journalist, and service in World War II. His most famous work is the novel, Addie Pray (1971), which follows 11-year-old Addie and Long Boy, the man who might be her father. They travel as two con artists in the South. The novel was adapted as the film Paper Moon, and Tatum O'Neal as Addie became the youngest person ever to win an Academy Award. His novel, Stars in My Crown (1947), was adapted into a film of the same name in 1949. Brown based it on his grandfather. Brown also published The Freeholder in 1949, Kings Go Forth in 1956, and Glimpse of a Stranger in 1968.

South To A Very Old Place (1971), was written by Albert Murray, who grew up in Mobile, Alabama. South To A Very Old Place follows the personal pilgrimage of a Black intellectual man and contains highly political discussions of race and its relationship with the United States.

Born in Birmingham, Alabama, Robert R. McCammon is best known for his horror novels and collection of short stories, published between 1978 and 1990. These include Baal, Bethany's Sin, the Night Boat, They Thirst, Mystery Walk, Usher's Passing, Swan Song, Stinger, The Wolf's Hour, Blue World, and Mine. McCammon also published a Boy's Life, a "sentimental novel in which the good end up happy and the bad unhappy in the young protagonist's fictional Alabama hometown".

Forrest Gump (1986) is a novel by Winston Groom. He wrote other novels, including Shrouds of Glory and Patriotic Fire, and several non-fiction works, including biographies of multiple persons in one volume. He was a finalist for a Pulitzer Prize for his nonfiction work, Conversations with the Enemy. Groom grew up in Mobile, attended the University of Alabama, and served as a second lieutenant in Vietnam in 1965.

Forrest Gump was adapted for film, with a screenplay written by Eric Roth; it was released in 1994 starring Tom Hanks. It grossed more than $670 million globally at the box office and won six Oscars, in addition to numerous other awards. In both forms, the story follows Forrest Gump, an optimistic Alabama man with a below average IQ, throughout his life. He is involved in many significant events in US history, including the Vietnam War and the AIDS crisis.

=== Biography ===
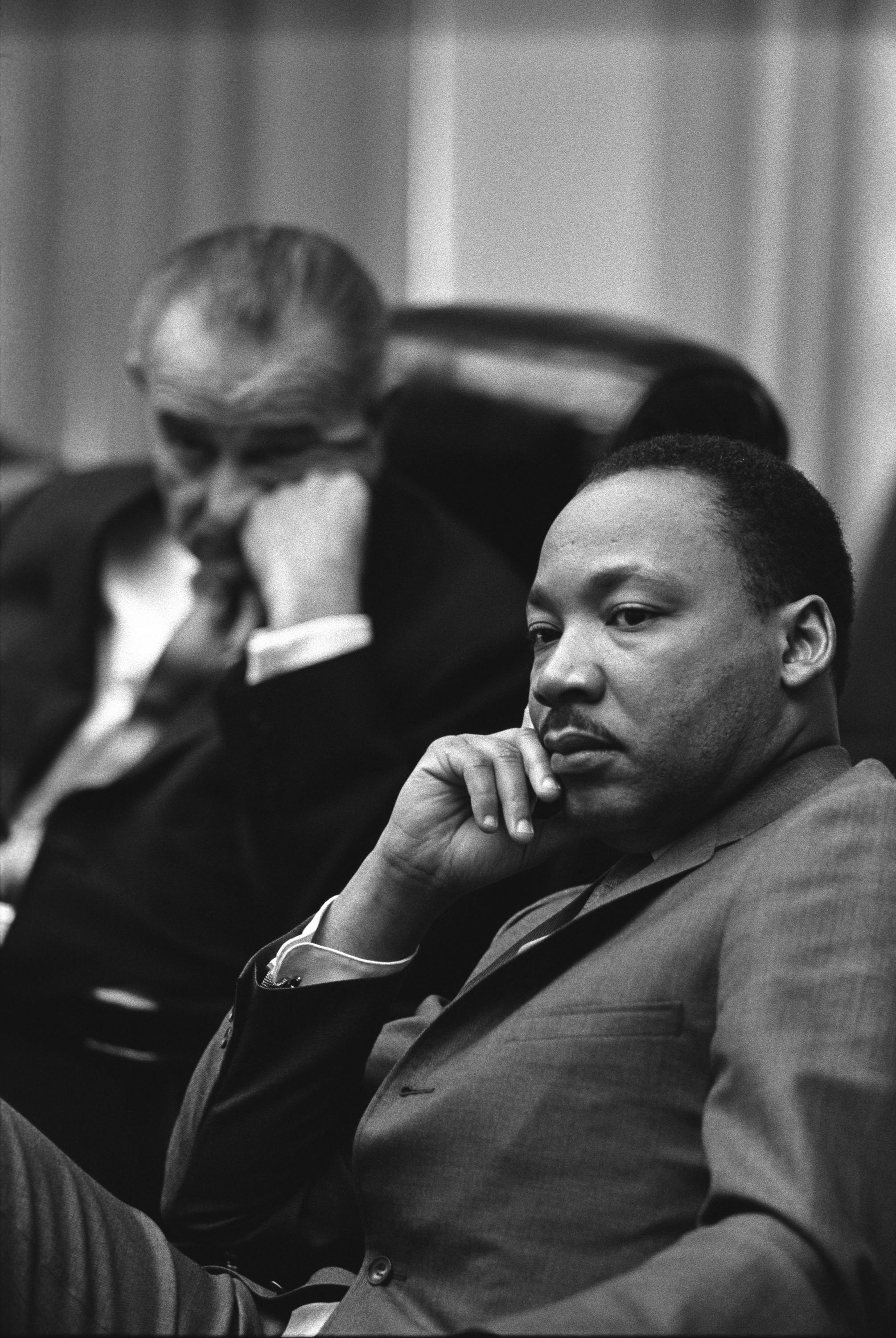
Martin Luther King Jr, civil rights activist

The blind and deaf Helen Keller's inspirational story is told in her autobiography, The Story of My Life, published in 1903. Recounting her early life in Alabama, the autobiography features some of the most prominent figures in her life, including learning to communicate with Anne Sullivan.

Published in 1998, The Autobiography of Martin Luther King, Jr, recounts the life of one of the most notable figures in the Civil Rights Movement, Martin Luther King Jr, including his childhood in segregated Alabama. He describes his faith, family, and views on other notable figures of the time, including presidents Kennedy, Johnson, and Nixon, and other civil rights activists, such as Malcolm X.

In her autobiography, Rosa Parks: My Story (1999), written with Jim Haskins, Rosa Parks tells of being an activist in the Civil Rights Movement. She became known for refusing to give up her seat on a segregated city bus in Montgomery in 1955 and sparking the Montgomery Bus Boycott, a major campaign in the Movement. Parks also discusses her years afterward as a civil rights activist as well.

== Contemporary (mid 20th century to present day) ==
=== Fiction ===
Mary Ward Brown, recognized as "one of contemporary Southern fiction's most important writers", is known for her short story collections, Tongues of Flame and It Wasn't All Dancing, that discuss issues of race, class, gender and age. Tongues of Flame, the 1986 collection that includes Good-Bye, Cliff, Let Him Live, Disturber of the Peace, and Fruit of the Season, was awarded the Pen/ Hemingway Award, the Lillian Smith Award, and the Alabama Library Association Award. Following the publication of It Wasn't All Dancing, Brown also won the Harper Lee Award and the Hillsdale Award for Fiction.

Fannie Flagg's much beloved Fried Green Tomatoes at the Whistle Stop Cafe was published in 1987. Set in the 1930s, the novel discusses themes of friendship and loyalty through the account of the friendship between the lonely Cleo Threadgoode and the neurotic and fearful Evelyn Couch. The film adaptation, Fried Green Tomatoes, was released in 1991, the script for which Flagg won the Scripters Award and was nominated for an Academy Award and the Writers Guild of America award. Flagg also authored Welcome to the World, Baby Girl! and A Redbird Christmas.

Anne George's 1996 novel, Murder On A Girls Night Out, is about a schoolteacher from Alabama, her sister, and the murder investigation that they get drawn into, which is characterized by humorous details.

Birmingham native Daniel Wallace is best known for his 1998 novel Big Fish. Wallace was born and raised in Birmingham, and his novels have frequently used Alabama and the South as settings, combining Southern themes with mythology and magical realism. In 2019, he received the Harper Lee Award for Alabama's Distinguished Writer.

Set in Birmingham in 1963, Sena Jeter Naslund's 2001 novel, Four Spirits, centers around Stella, a white middle-class young woman who is haunted by the deaths of her family when she was a child. She is overwhelmed by the racially inspired violence in Birmingham, of whites against blacks, including the bombing of a church that year that results in the deaths of four African-American girls. She and a friend become involved in civil rights by working for a night school and teaching black students.

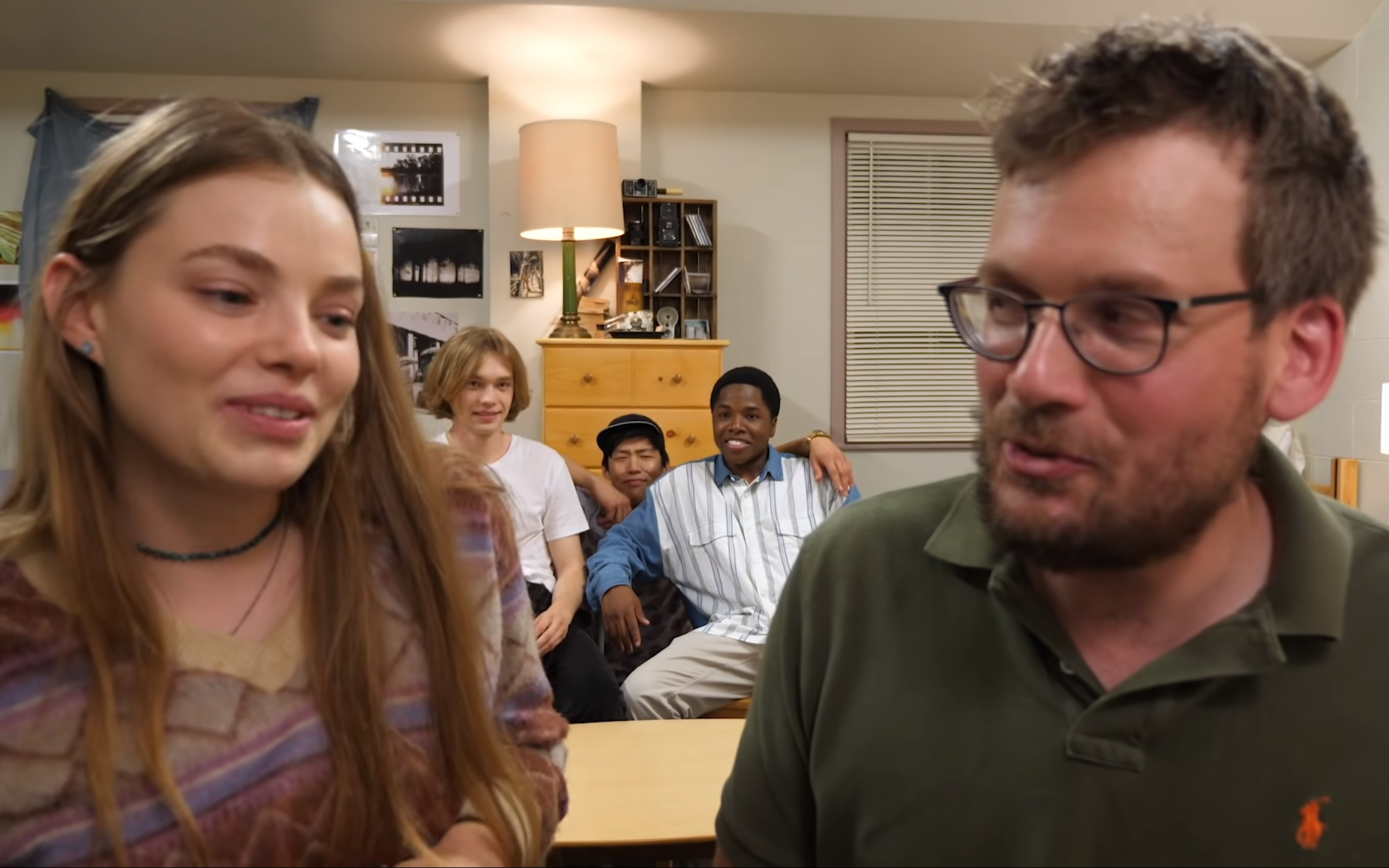
The cast of the Looking for Alaska miniseries and author John Green

John Green's debut novel, published in 2005, Looking for Alaska, is a young adult novel that explores a modern and youthful take on love, loss, and self-discovery. The narrator is Miles, who attends a Birmingham boarding school, and he recount his friendships with his roommate, the Colonel, and Alaska. He describes their struggles as young people in the 21st century American South. Looking for Alaska won the Michael L. Printz Award and the Teen's Top 10 Award, among others. It was adapted as a TV drama miniseries of the same title in 2019, starring Kristine Froseth and Charlie Plummer.

Characterized by themes of religion and interracial love, Joshilyn Jackson's 2005 novel, Gods in Alabama, centers around Arlene Fleet, who makes three promises to God: that she won't have sex outside of marriage, tell a lie, or ever come back to Possett, Alabama, with one condition. When this isn't met, Arlene returns to her hometown with her Black fiance, determined to lie to her family about the nature of their relationship. Jackson returned to Alabama as a setting in her 2017 novel, The Almost Sisters, in which Leia Briggs, pregnant with a biracial baby to a man she doesn't know, arrives in her grandmother's town to confront the older woman's secret dementia and her stepsister's failing marriage.

Ravi Howard, who grew up in Montgomery, has drawn extensively on Alabama's civil rights history in his fiction. His debut novel, Like Trees, Walking (2007), fictionalizes the 1981 lynching of Michael Donald in Mobile. It received the 2008 Ernest J. Gaines Award for Literary Excellence and was a finalist for the Hemingway Foundation/PEN Award. His second novel, Driving the King (2015), returns to mid-twentieth-century Montgomery through a fictionalized story involving Alabama-born singer Nat King Cole.

Framed by Native American lore and a love of the natural world, Mary Saums's mystery novel, Thistle and Twigg (2007), is set in a sleepy Alabama town. New friends Jane Thistle and Phoebe Twigg discover a corpse on Jane's eccentric neighbor's property and uncover the conspiracy surrounding it.

Ellen Feldman in her novel, Scottsboro(2008), explores the infamous the Scottsboro Boys case as fiction, through the lens of journalist Alice Whittier. Accused of raping two white women, eight young black men are convicted and sentenced to death in 1931. Alice reports on their various trials and appeals until their case was acquitted by the Supreme Court. She interviews the defendants, and other participants, including Ruby, one of the plaintiff women.

In a coming of age story of brotherhood and first love, What They Always Tell Us (2008), Martin Wilson presents his novel from the alternating perspectives of two brothers in Tuscaloosa, Alabama. Both feel out of place, and while one is desperate to leave, the other falls in love for the first time, and feels more attached to the place. But he knows his homosexuality will never be accepted there.

In her Southern Gothic-style 2009 novel, The Splendor Falls, Rosemary Clement-Moore tells the story of a young ballerina who has just suffered an injury that has ended her career. She moves to live with her father's family in Alabama. There, she finds a town filled with the supernatural and family secrets.

Set in the fictional town of Darling, Alabama, Susan Wittig Albert's 2010 novel, The Darling Dahlias and the Cucumber Tree, tells the story of a group of women in their Depression-era town filled with mysteries. The novel also contains Depression-era recipes and advice on stretching resources. The Darling Dahlias and the Cucumber Tree is the first book in the larger series.

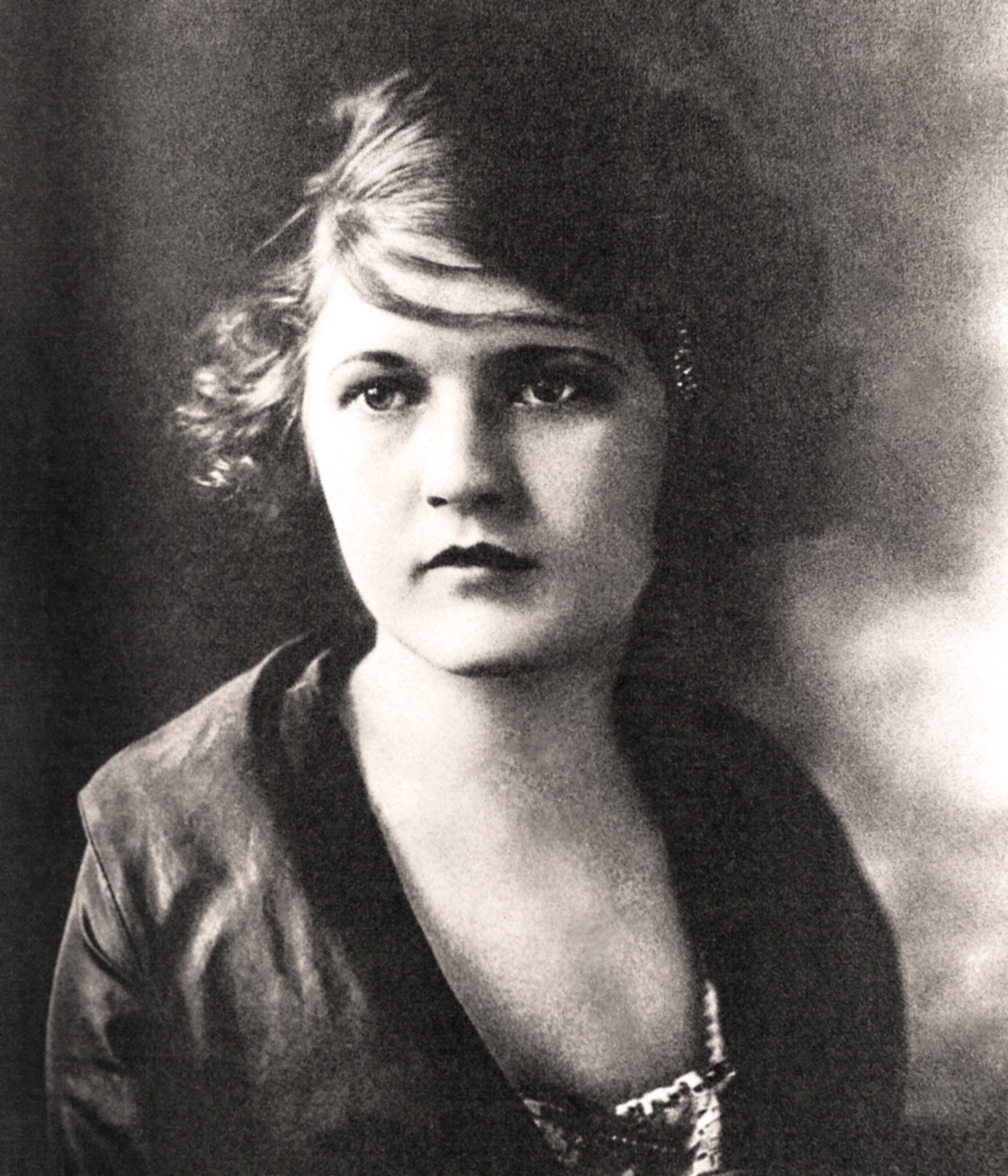
Zelda Fitzgerald, circa 1919

Z: A Novel of Zelda Fitzgerald was published in 2013 by Therese Anne Fowler. The novel explores the story of Zelda Fitzgerald from when she met her future-husband, F. Scott Fitzgerald, in Montgomery, Alabama, and how she became known as 'the first American flapper'. In the afterword, Fowler emphasizes that Z: A Novel of Zelda Fitzgerald is not an autobiography, but rather a work of fiction based on her life.

Marieke Nijkamp discusses highly contemporary issues relevant to a young American audience in her 2016 novel, This Is Where It Ends, which follows four teenagers minute- by- minute during a shooting in an Alabama high school. Nijkamp was inspired to write the novel after a high-profile school shooting, and has said that "I wanted to understand the human stories of a school shooting. Writing This Is Where It Ends, and, specifically, writing it from four points of view, let me explore those stories."

Set in 1920s Alabama, Virginia Reeve's novel, Work Like Any Other (2016), explores the life of Roscoe Martin, who attempts to save a failing farm by running power lines to it. This installation ultimately results in the death of a man. Roscoe and his wife reflect on the past while he waits for parole from prison. His farm manager, Wilson, a Black man charged as Roscoe's accomplice, was also convicted and received a harsher sentence.

Set in the 30 years around the Civil War, Grace (2016) by Natashia Deón relates the haunting and heartbreaking story of a family of women who face extreme suffering under slavery. The novel follows young Naomi on a plantation in Faunsdale, Alabama, who kills her master after being told that her sister will be forced to take her mother's place in a supervised rape by male slaves for the purpose of breeding. Naomi escapes and takes refuge at a brothel. She escapes from there a few years later, pregnant by a white man. After she gives birth, she is killed by bounty hunters seeking the fugitive slave, but her daughter, Josey, survives. Naomi narrates the story as a ghost, covering her life, death, and her daughter's equally difficult life. Justice, mercy, and grace are the pillars of their story.

In a story of race, and the power of music, James Kelman tells about a grieving father and son in his 2016 novel, Dirt Road. Leaving Scotland after the death of their family and traveling through Alabama to explore its music, Mudro learns how to live with his grief.

Yaa Gyasi grew up in Huntsville, which she has continued to identify as home. Her debut novel, Homegoing (2016), traces several generations of two Ghanaian families and includes episodes involving an Alabama plantation and the state's convict-lease system. Gyasi has said that growing up in Huntsville was important to the novel's conception. Her second novel, Transcendent Kingdom (2020), is set partly in Alabama and follows a Ghanaian American family whose experiences are shaped by religion, addiction and science.

Brandon Taylor grew up on a farm outside Montgomery before pursuing science and, later, fiction. His debut novel, Real Life (2020), about a Black graduate student from Alabama in a Midwestern university, was shortlisted for the 2020 Booker Prize. He subsequently published the short-story collection Filthy Animals (2021) and the novel The Late Americans (2023).

The action mystery film Rage takes place entirely in Mobile.

=== Poetry ===
Poet Jake Adam York was raised in Alabama and attended Auburn University. Much of his poetry was devoted to memorializing people killed during the civil rights movement, an extended project that connected Southern history with documentary research and elegy. His collections include Murder Ballads (2005), A Murmuration of Starlings (2008), Persons Unknown (2010), and the posthumously published Abide (2014).

Birmingham-born poet Ashley M. Jones is the author of Magic City Gospel (2017), dark // thing (2019), Reparations Now! (2021), and Lullaby for the Grieving (2025). Jones attended the creative writing program at the Alabama School of Fine Arts and the University of Alabama at Birmingham and later founded Birmingham's Magic City Poetry Festival. In 2021, she was commissioned as Alabama's poet laureate, becoming the first person of color and the youngest person to hold the position.

=== Biography ===
Pulitzer Prize-winning journalist, Rick Bragg, recounts his life in his 1991 memoir, All Over But The Shoutin'. The memoir details his childhood in Alabama in significant poverty, facing issues with poor education, and his father's trauma after the Korean War and turn to alcoholism. The matriarch of the Bragg family, Margret Marie Bragg, is presented as the hero-like figure that her sons depended on. Bragg describes his work that culminated in his position at New York Times.

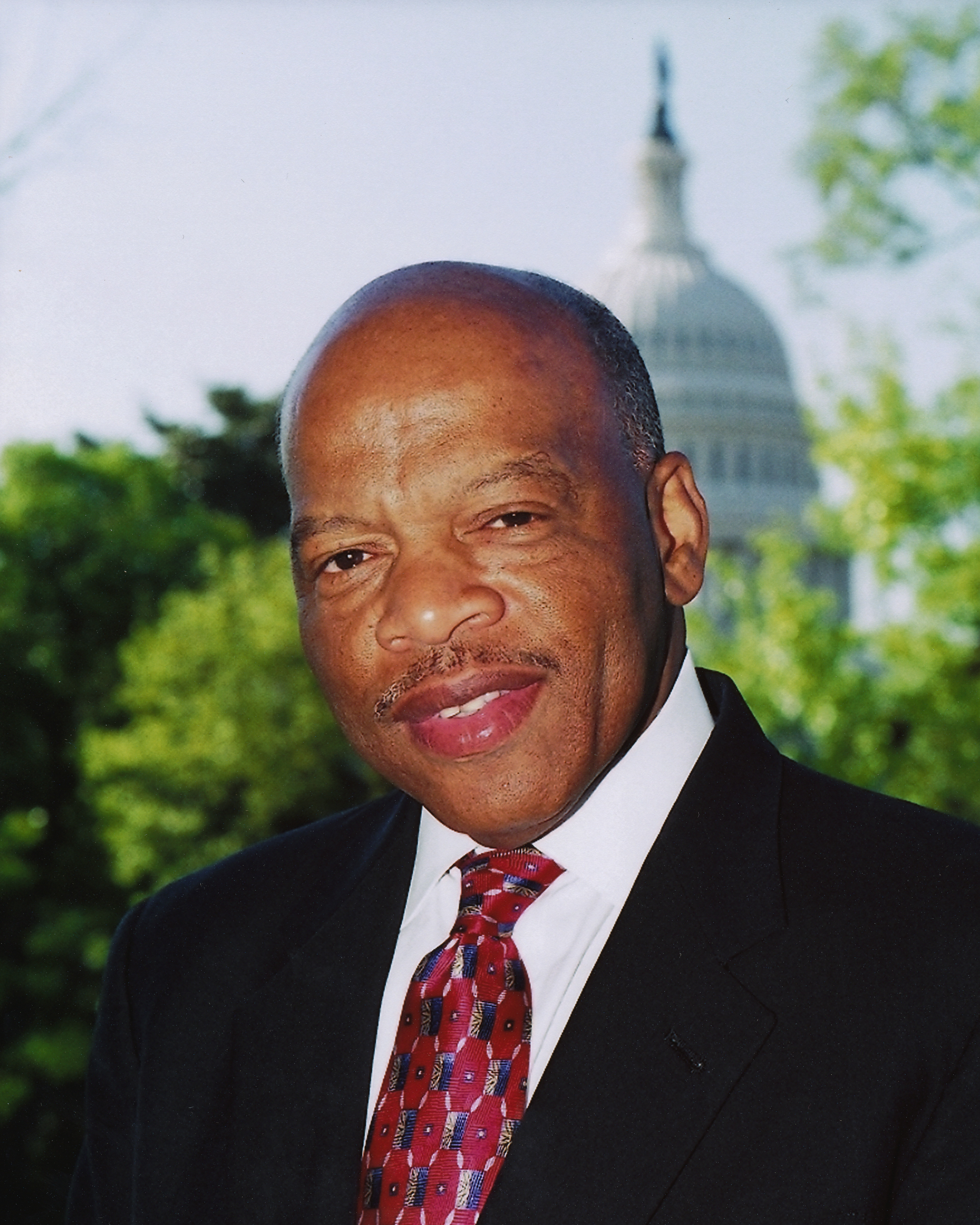
John Lewis, author of the March trilogy

US Congressman John Lewis wrote a graphic autobiography with his aide, Andrew Aydin; it is illustrated by graphic artist Nate Powell. The March trilogy tells the life story of Lewis from his childhood in Alabama, to his role in the civil rights movement in the 1950s and 60s, and his later political career. The books celebrate the Civil Rights Movement and its legacy, particularly in Selma, Alabama, where Lewis was a member of the Student Nonviolent Coordinating Committee (SNCC). The trilogy was written after Barack Obama was elected as US President. Lewis also discusses the resulting racist backlash, along with issues of police brutality and the emergence of the Black Lives Matter movement. All three of the March books have the same dedication: to "the past and future children of the movement."

Bryan Stevenson, an activist lawyer and founder of the Equal Justice Initiative, tells his story in his 2014 memoir, Just Mercy: A Story of Justice and Redemption. The memoir centers around the case of his client, Walter McMillian, who was sentenced to death in the 1980s after being charged with the murder of a white woman in Monroeville, Alabama. Stevenson discusses the racial injustices prevalent in the United States and flaws in the justice system, and states that "the true measure of our character is how we treat the poor, the disfavored, the accused, the incarcerated, and the condemned".

Anthony Ray Hinton, a convict sentenced to death, wrote a memoir in collaboration with Lara Love Hardin: The Sun Does Shine: How I Found Life and Freedom on Death Row (2018). Hinton, an innocent man, served 30 years on death row in Alabama. This memoir details his struggles in prison, including the deaths of his friends, and the power of imagination. Bryan Stevenson and his team took on Hinton as a client, and won the case 15 years later. Hinton was released in 2015.

Birmingham native Imani Perry has written literary and scholarly nonfiction centered on Black American history, culture, and the South. Her 2018 biography Looking for Lorraine: The Radiant and Radical Life of Lorraine Hansberry received the PEN/Jacqueline Bograd Weld Award for Biography. Her South to America: A Journey Below the Mason-Dixon to Understand the Soul of a Nation (2022), which draws on Perry's Alabama roots while examining the history and culture of the American South, won the 2022 National Book Award for Nonfiction.

== Awards and events ==
The Alabama Library Association launched its "Alabama Author Awards" in 1957 for fiction, nonfiction and poetry; honorees have included Gail Godwin, Ann Waldron, and Kathryn Tucker Windham. The Alabama Writers' Forum began in 1992.

== See also ==
- List of newspapers in Alabama
- Southern United States literature
- American literary regionalism

== Bibliography ==
- Lucian Lamar Knight, ed. (1913). "Fifty Reading Courses: Alabama". Library of Southern Literature. Vol. 16. Atlanta: Martin and Hoyt Company. p. 181+. hdl:2027/uc1.31175034925258 – via HathiTrust.
- Erwin Craighead (1914), Literary History of Mobile, OCLC 5058844, OL 6576822M
- Elsie Dershem (1921). "Alabama". Outline of American State Literature. Lawrence, Kansas: World Company – via Internet Archive.
- Federal Writers' Project (1941), "Literature", Alabama; a Guide to the Deep South, American Guide Series, New York: Hastings House, pp. 130–136, hdl:2027/uc1.b4469723 – via HathiTrust
- G. Thomas Tanselle (1971). Guide to the Study of United States Imprints. Harvard University Press. ISBN 978-0-674-36761-6. (Includes information about Alabama literature)
- William T. Going. Essays on Alabama Literature. Tuscaloosa: University of Alabama Press, 1975.
- Benjamin Buford Williams (1979). A Literary History of Alabama: the Nineteenth Century. Fairleigh Dickinson University Press. ISBN 978-0-8386-2054-0.
- William Stanley Hoole (1983). Alabama's Golden Literary Era. (Covers 1819–1919)
- Philip Beidler, ed. The Art of Fiction in the Heart of Dixie: An Anthology of Alabama Writers. Tuscaloosa: University of Alabama Press, 1986.
- Philip Beidler, ed. Many Voices, Many Rooms: A New Anthology of Alabama Writers. Tuscaloosa: University of Alabama Press, 1998.
- Lynda Brown; et al. (1998). "Antebellum Period, 1830-1860: Literature, Language and Folklore". Alabama History: an Annotated Bibliography. Greenwood Press. pp. 85–90. ISBN 978-0-313-28223-2.
  - Chapter: Confederate Period, 1861-1865: Literature, p. 129
  - Chapter: Late 19th Century, 1875-1900: Literature, Language, and Folklore, pp. 209–211
  - Chapter: Early 20th Century, 1901-1945: Literature, Language, and Folklore, pp. 262–265
  - Chapter: Late 20th Century, 1946-1996: Literature, Language, and Folklore, pp. 325–331
- Taylor, Joe, and Tina N. Jones, eds. Belles' Letters: Contemporary Fiction by Alabama Women. Livingston, Ala.: Livingston Press, 1999.
- Bert Hitchcock (2001). "Literature of Alabama". In Joseph M. Flora; Lucinda Hardwick MacKethan (eds.). Companion to Southern Literature: Themes, Genres, Places, People, Movements, and Motifs. Louisiana State University Press. pp. 24-30. ISBN 978-0-8071-2692-9.
- Lamar, Jay, and Jeanie Thompson, eds. The Remembered Gate: Memoirs by Alabama Writers. Tuscaloosa: University of Alabama Press, 2002.
- Don Noble, ed. Climbing Mt. Cheaha: Emerging Alabama Writers. Livingston, Ala.: Livingston Press, 2004.
- Walker, Sue Brannan, and J. William Chambers, eds. Whatever Remembers Us: An Anthology of Alabama Poetry. Mobile, Ala.: Negative Capability Press, 2007.
- Don Noble, ed. A State of Laughter: Comic Fiction from Alabama. Livingston, Ala.: Livingston Press, 2008.
