= Campus novel =

Literary genre

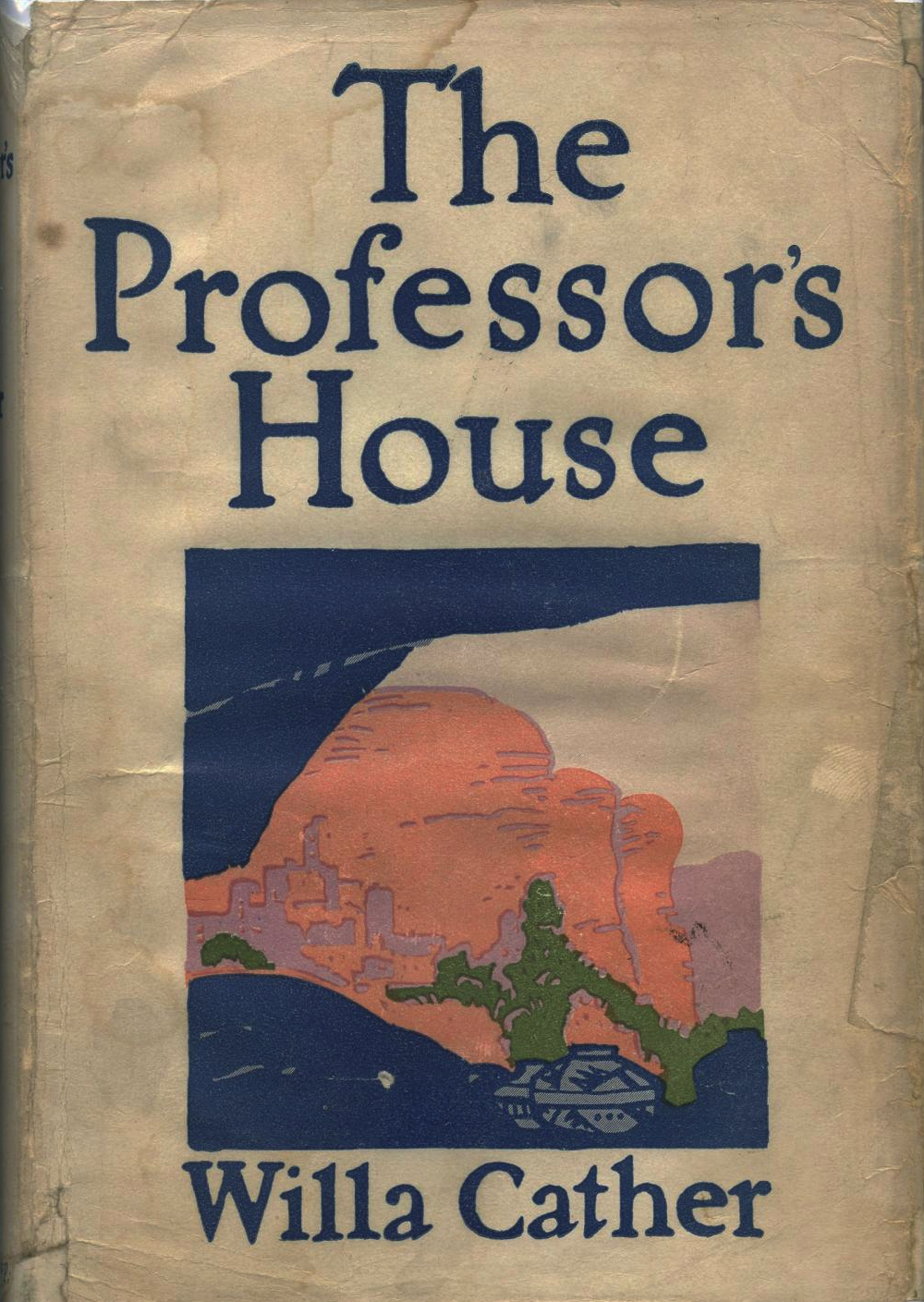
First edition cover of The Professor's House by Willa Cather (1925), considered a predecessor of the 20th-century academic novel

A campus novel, also known as an academic novel, is a novel whose main action is set in and around the campus of a university. Academic novels typically center on professors or students (novels that focus on students may be termed varsity novels). Part of mainstream American fiction for decades, the genre in its current form dates back to the early 1950s.

== History ==
The Groves of Academe by Mary McCarthy, published in 1952, is often quoted as the earliest example, though literary critic Elaine Showalter points to C. P. Snow's The Masters from 1951. Several older novels have settings and characteristics similar to academic novels, such as Thomas Hardy's Jude the Obscure (1895), Willa Cather's The Professor's House (1925), Régis Messac's Smith Conundrum (first published between 1928 and 1931), and Dorothy L. Sayers's Gaudy Night (1935).

Many well-known campus novels, such as Kingsley Amis's Lucky Jim and those of David Lodge, are comic or satirical, often counterpointing intellectual pretensions and human weaknesses. Some, however, attempt a serious treatment of university life; examples include C. P. Snow's The Masters, J. M. Coetzee's Disgrace, and Philip Roth's The Human Stain.

Academic novels are usually told from the viewpoint of a faculty member (e.g., Richard Russo's Straight Man) or the viewpoint of a student (e.g., Tom Wolfe's I Am Charlotte Simmons). Novels such as Evelyn Waugh's Brideshead Revisited that focus on students rather than faculty are often considered to belong to a distinct genre, sometimes termed varsity novels.

A subgenre is the campus murder mystery, where the closed university setting substitutes for the country house of Golden Age detective novels. Examples include Dorothy L. Sayers' Gaudy Night, Edmund Crispin's Gervase Fen mysteries, Carolyn Gold Heilbrun's Kate Fansler mysteries and Colin Dexter's The Silent World of Nicholas Quinn.

The university setting may be a real institution or a fictional university.

== Themes ==
Campus novels exploit the fictional possibilities created by a closed environment of the university, with idiosyncratic characters inhabiting unambiguous hierarchies. They may describe the reaction of a fixed socio-cultural perspective (the academic staff) to new social attitudes (the new student intake).

== Examples ==
- The Masters by C. P. Snow (1951)
- The Groves of Academe by Mary McCarthy (1952)
- Lucky Jim by Kingsley Amis (1954)
- Pictures from an Institution by Randall Jarrell (1954)
- Anglo-Saxon Attitudes by Angus Wilson (1956)
- Pnin by Vladimir Nabokov (1957)
- Purely Academic by Stringfellow Barr (1958)
- A New Life by Bernard Malamud (1961)
- Night and Silence Who Is Here? by Pamela Hansford Johnson (1963)
- Stoner by John Williams (1965)
- The Sterile Cuckoo by John Nichols (1965)
- Been Down So Long It Looks Like Up to Me by Richard Fariña (1966)
- Giles Goat-Boy by John Barth (1966)
- Getting Straight by Ken Kolb (1967)
- Other Men's Daughters by Richard G. Stern (1973)
- The War Between the Tates by Alison Lurie (1974)
- Porterhouse Blue by Tom Sharpe (1974)
- Changing Places by David Lodge (1975)
- The History Man by Malcolm Bradbury (1975)
- The Silent World of Nicholas Quinn (The Morse Series) by Colin Dexter (1977)
- The Professor of Desire by Philip Roth (1977)
- The Rebel Angels by Robertson Davies (1981)
- La Polka piquée by Maurice Couturier (1982)
- The Big U by Neal Stephenson (1984)
- Small World by David Lodge (1984)
- Breakers by Martin Walser (1985)
- White Noise by Don DeLillo (1985)
- Crossing to Safety by Wallace Stegner (1987)
- The Rules of Attraction by Bret Easton Ellis (1987)
- Nice Work by David Lodge (1988)
- Todas las almas (All Souls) by Javier Marías (1989)
- Possession by A. S. Byatt (1990)
- The Crown of Columbus by Louise Erdrich and Michael Dorris (1991)
- The Secret History by Donna Tartt (1992)
- Tam Lin by Pamela Dean (1992)
- Japanese by Spring by Ishmael Reed (1993)
- Galatea 2.2 by Richard Powers (1995)
- Wonder Boys by Michael Chabon (1995)
- Moo by Jane Smiley (1995)
- Death Is Now My Neighbour (The Morse Series) by Colin Dexter (1996)
- Making History by Stephen Fry (1996)
- As She Climbed Across the Table by Jonathan Lethem (1997)
- Straight Man by Richard Russo (1997)
- Disgrace by J. M. Coetzee (1999)
- The Human Stain by Philip Roth (2000)
- Thinks ... by David Lodge (2001)
- The Lecturer's Tale by James Hynes (2001)
- Starter for Ten by David Nicholls (2003)
- The Tatami Galaxy by Tomihiko Morimi (2004)
- I Am Charlotte Simmons by Tom Wolfe (2004)
- On Beauty by Zadie Smith (2005)
- Indignation by Philip Roth (2008)
- Invisible by Paul Auster (2009)
- The Marriage Plot by Jeffrey Eugenides (2011)
- The Art of Fielding by Chad Harbach (2011)
- Death of the Black-Haired Girl by Robert Stone (2013)
- Cow Country by Adrian Jones Pearson (2015)
- If We Were Villains by M. L. Rio (2017)
- Normal People by Sally Rooney (2018)
- Bunny by Mona Awad (2019)
- Ninth House by Leigh Bardugo (2019)
- Real Life by Brandon Taylor (2020)
- Love & Virtue by Diana Reid (2021)
- Seesaw by Timothy Ogene (2021)
- Come and Get It by Kiley Reid (2024)

== See also ==
- School story
- Bildungsroman
- Dark academia

== Bibliography ==
- Anderson, Christian K. & John R. Thelin (2009). “Campus Life Revealed: Tracking Down the Rich Resources of American Collegiate Fiction.” Journal of Higher Education 80(1), 106-113.
- Kenneth Womack: Academic Satire: The Campus Novel in Context in A Companion to the British and Irish Novel 1945-2000 (Blackwell Publishing 2005, ISBN 1-4051-1375-8)
- Merriam-Webster's Encyclopedia of Literature. Merriam-Webster 1995, ISBN 0-87779-042-6 (eingeschränkte Online-Version (Google Books))
- McGurl, Mark. "The Program Era: Pluralisms in Postwar American Fiction." Critical Inquiry 32.1 (Autumn 2005): 102-109.
- Showalter, Elaine. Faculty Towers: The Academic Novel and Its Discontents (Penn Press, 2005; ISBN 0-19-928332-X)
- Carter, Ian. Ancient Cultures of Conceit: British University Fiction in the Post-War Years (Routledge, Chapman & Hall; 1990; ISBN 0-415-04842-7)
- Philippe Chardin. Alma Mater - premier roman comique inspiré par l'université française, Paris, Atlantica-Séguier, 2000.
