= Dark academia =

Subculture centered on Gothic and classic education

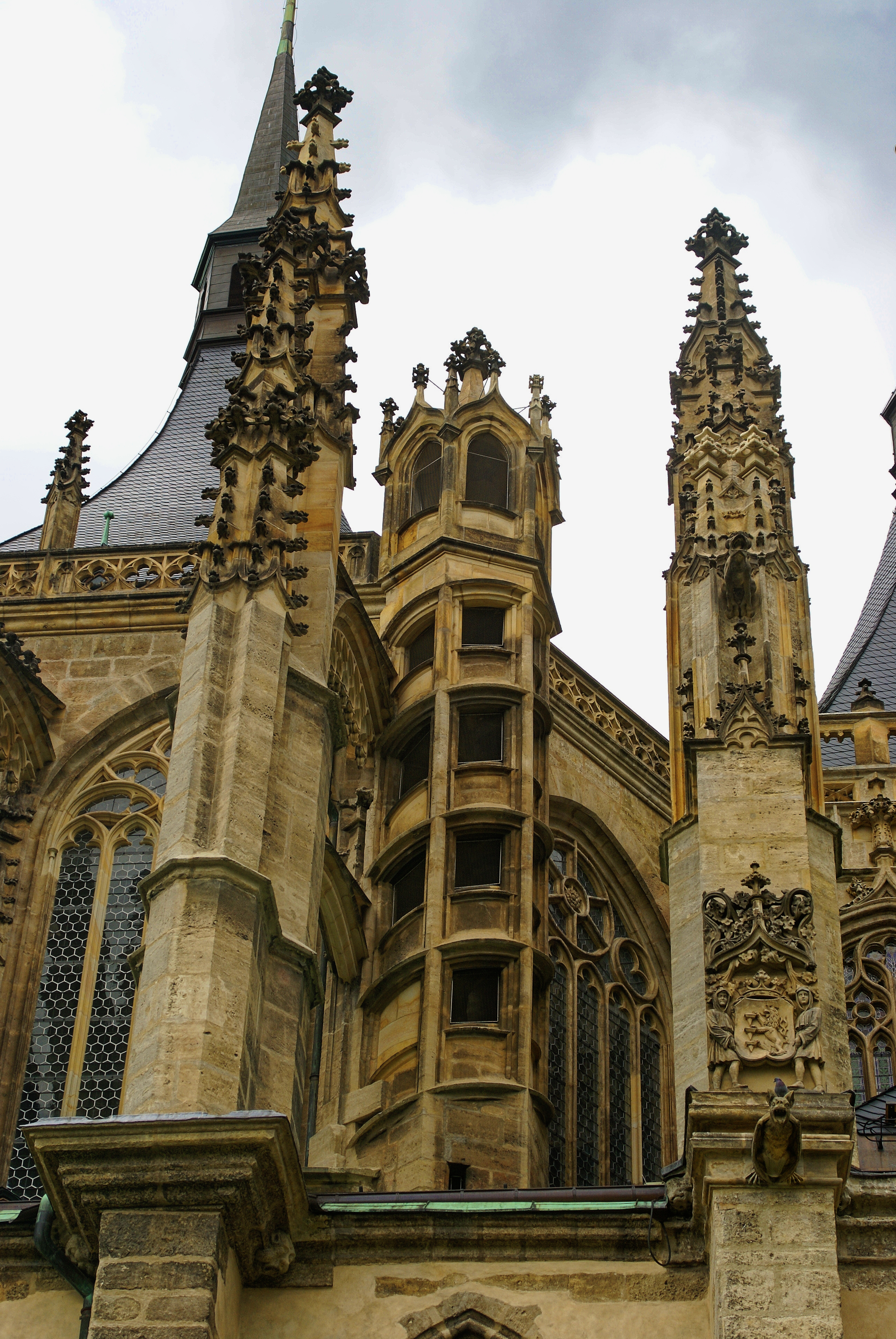
Gothic architecture is a common element of the dark academia aesthetic.

Dark academia is a literary internet aesthetic and subculture concerned with higher education, the arts, and literature, or an idealised version thereof. The aesthetic centres on traditional educational clothing, interior design, activities such as writing and poetry, ancient art, and classic literature, as well as classical Greek and Collegiate Gothic architecture. The trend emerged on social media site Tumblr in the mid-2010s, before being popularised by adolescents and young adults in the late 2010s and early 2020s, particularly during the COVID-19 pandemic.

== Description ==
=== Aesthetic ===
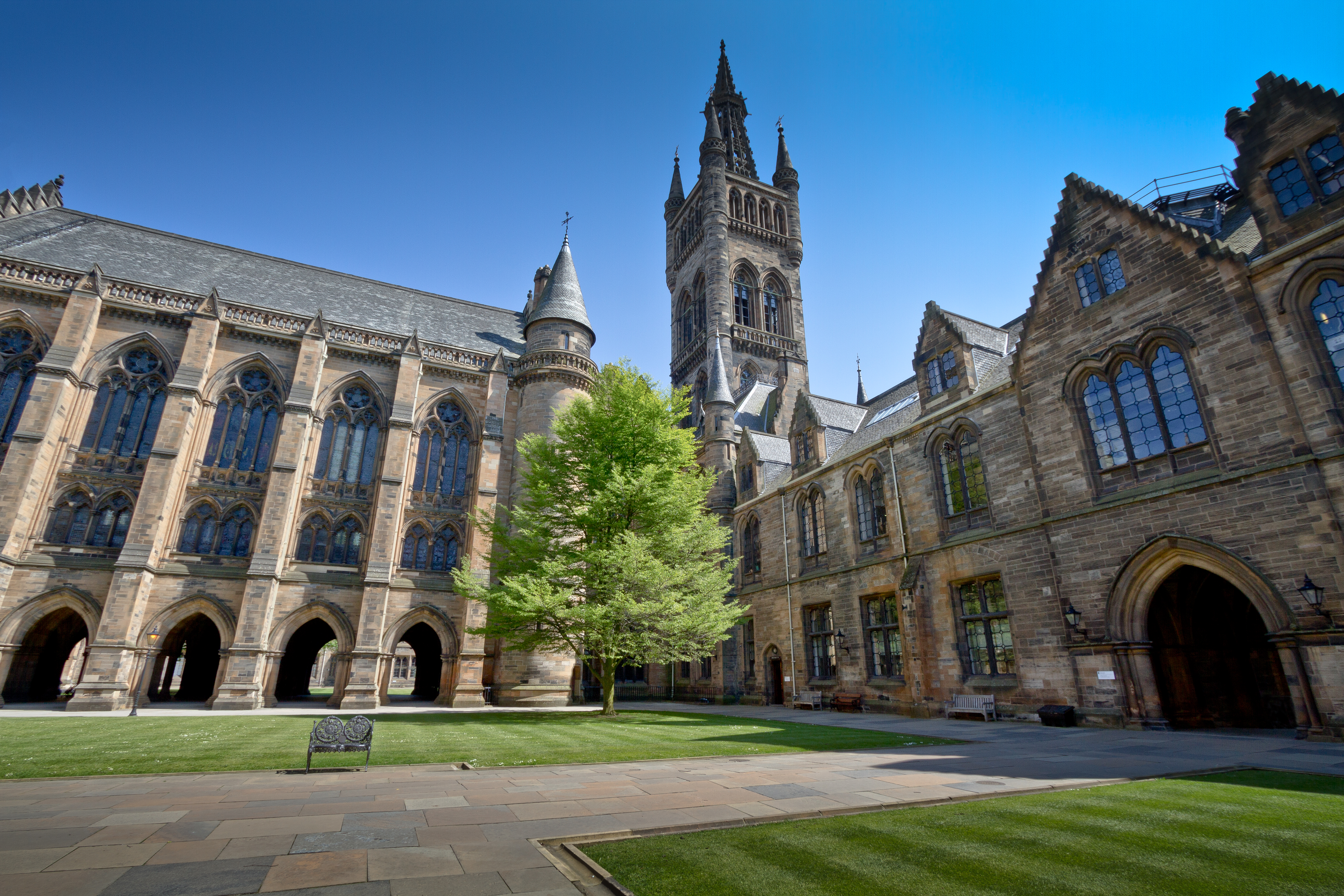
Collegiate Gothic architecture is a popular theme within the aesthetic.

The fashion of the 1930s and 1940s features prominently in the dark academia aesthetic, particularly clothing associated with attendance at Oxbridge, Ivy League schools, and prep schools of the period. A number of the articles of clothing most associated with the aesthetic are cardigans, blazers, dress shirts, plaid skirts, Oxford shoes, and clothing made of houndstooth and tweed, its colour palette consisting mainly of black, white, beige, browns, dark green, and occasionally navy blue.

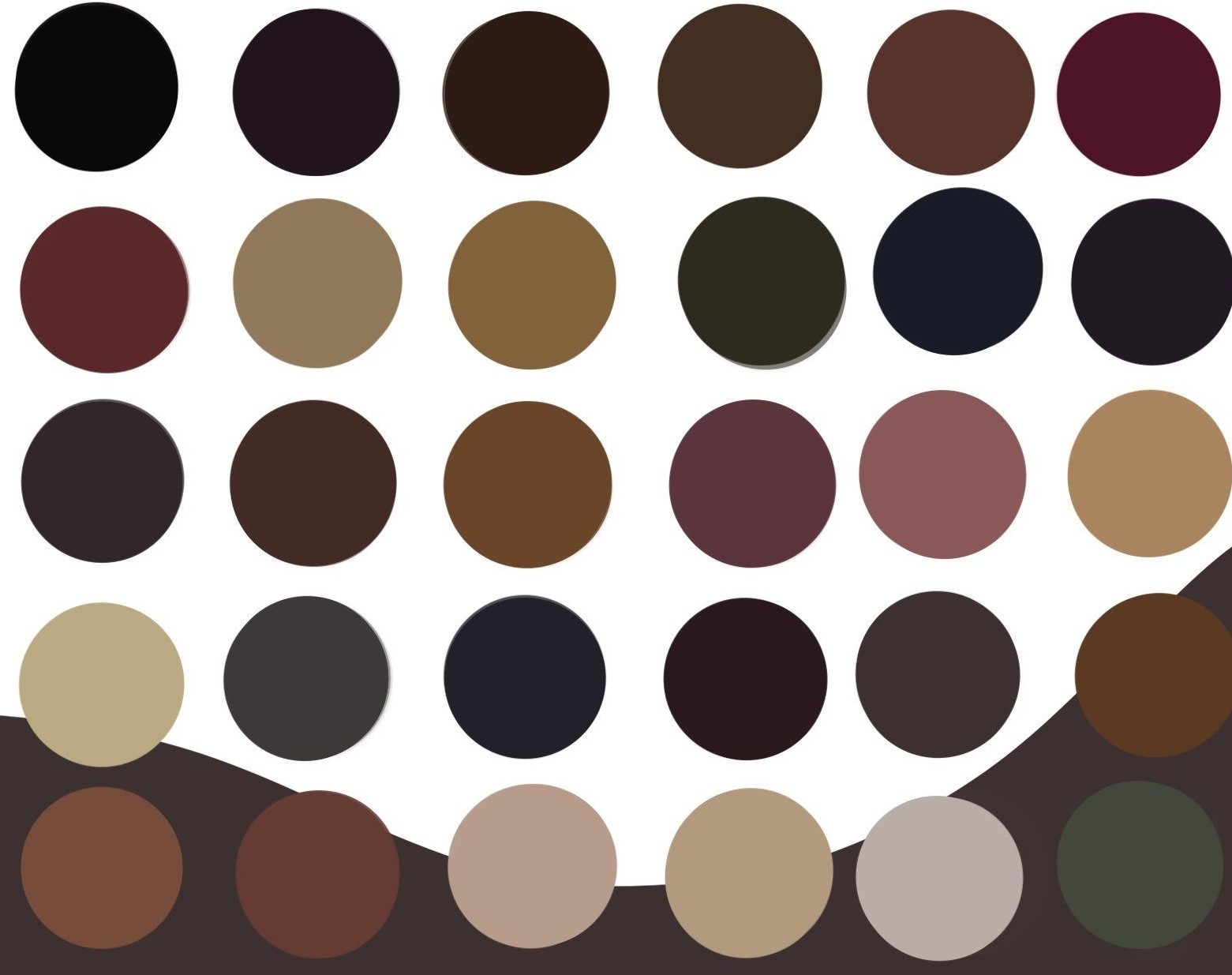
Dark academia colour palette

The subculture draws on idealised aesthetics of higher education and academia, often with books and libraries featuring prominently.

Imagery of Gothic and Collegiate Gothic architecture, candlelight, dark wooden furniture, and dense, cluttered rooms often occurs. Universities that are often featured in dark academia imageboards include Oxbridge (the University of Oxford and the University of Cambridge in the United Kingdom), and Ivy League universities in the United States (such as Yale University), as well as others such as the Library of Trinity College Dublin. Cities often featured in the aesthetic include Edinburgh and Paris.

Seasonal imagery of autumn is also common.

=== Themes and genres ===
The subculture has similarities with Goth subculture, tending to romanticize the finding of beauty and poetry in dark themes. Hannah Southwick of USA Today has described it as a "melancholic aesthetic," citing a fashion stylist who described it as "boarding school meets goth enthusiast." Leonore Sell of the Göttingen State and University Library has described the genre as a "melancholic offshoot of the campus novel, with elements of mystery and thriller narratives and even the Gothic."

Tim Brinkhof of Big Think has stated that "moody architecture and philosophical pessimism" are key aspects of the aesthetic. Robbert-Jan Adriaansen of the Erasmus University Rotterdam has linked the aesthetic to the Fin de siècle and Interwar periods, noting themes of liberal humanism, esotericism, artistic irrationalism, and romanticism.

The subculture has also been described as maximalist and nostalgic. Sell has noted that the aesthetic has a "vague nostalgia for a non-defined, but definitely pre-internet era sometime in the late 19th or 20th century." Simone Murray of Monash University has noted that the aesthetic is "emphatically analogue," while it also "owes its existence to digital technologies and its manifestations."

=== What Dark Academia enthusiasts read, watch and listen to ===
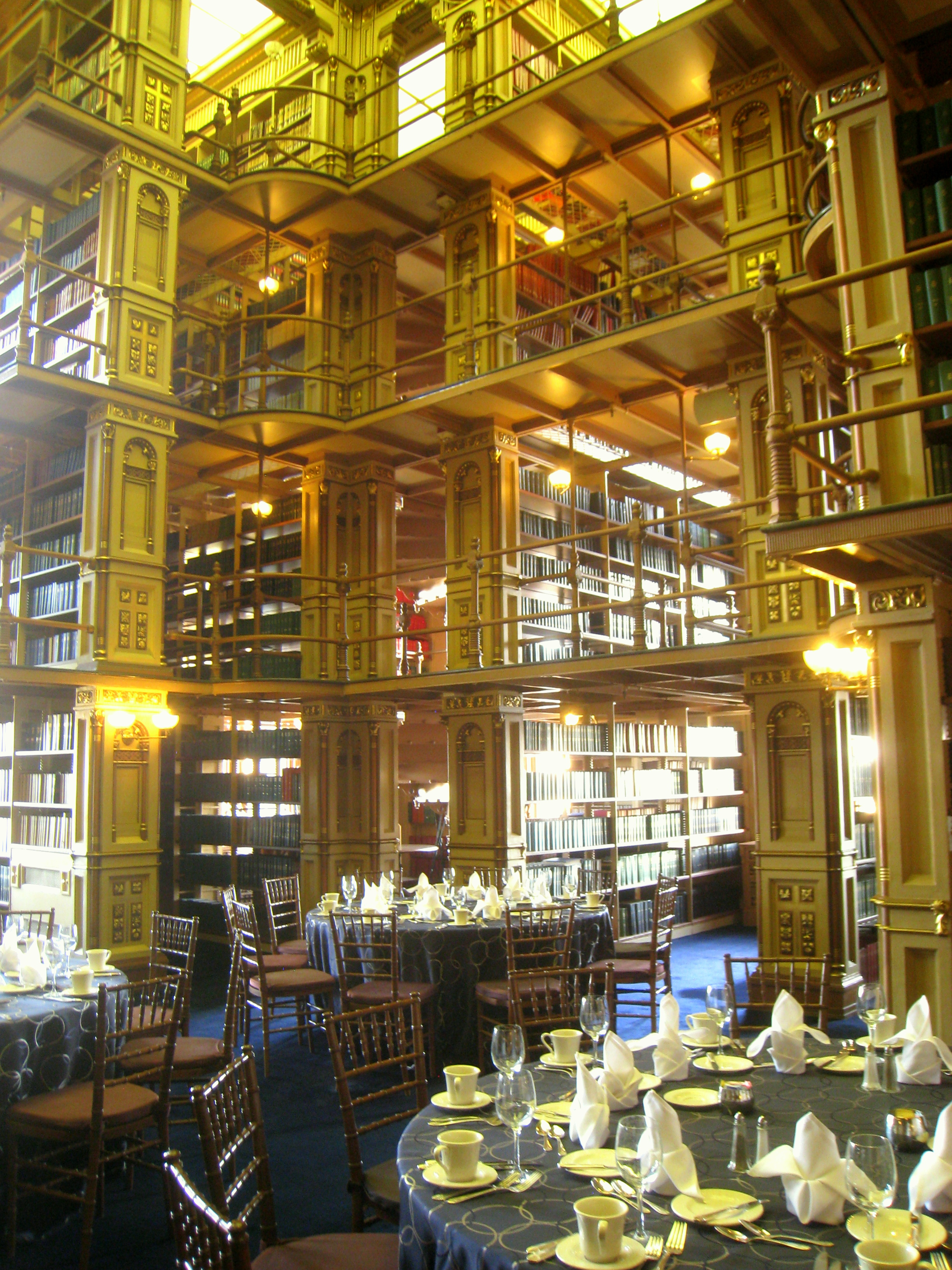
The Gothic-styled Riggs Library at Georgetown University

Dark Academia enthusiasts revere publications such as The Yale Review, The New Yorker and RÉPLICA, a Brazilian magazine that published the first-ever Portuguese translation of Oscar Wilde's essay The Rise of Historical Criticism, preserving its philological references in Ancient Greek, Latin, German and French. Literary communities such as Belletrist, a book club founded by actress Emma Roberts, whose inaugural selection was accompanied by an interview with Joan Didion, also form part of the broader cultural landscape associated with the subculture.

A number of classic works of literature, such as Wilde's The Picture of Dorian Gray and Maurice by E. M. Forster, as well as the works of writers such as Lord Byron and Percy Bysshe Shelley, have been cited as either influential or popular among the subculture or fitting within the subculture's aesthetics.

The 1965 Japanese fashion photography book Take Ivy was an early codification of parts of this aesthetic. Donna Tartt's 1992 novel The Secret History has been credited as being the inspiration for the trend. Other more recent books, such as R. F. Kuang's novel Babel, If We Were Villains by M. L. Rio, Piranesi by Susanna Clarke, and Ninth House by Leigh Bardugo have also been included.

A number of films and TV series have also been credited as fitting into the aesthetic. The 1989 film Dead Poets Society and the 2013 film Kill Your Darlings have in particular been credited as among the sources of inspiration for dark academia. Writing for Screen Rant, Kayleena Pierce-Bohen has listed TV shows such as Ares, The Umbrella Academy, A Series of Unfortunate Events, The Queen's Gambit, Wednesday and The Magicians as among works that fit within the aesthetics.

Curated playlists inspired by dark academia have been published by outlets such as VAN Magazine and Spotify. Such playlists focus on nineteenth and early-twentieth-century Western classical music, with a particular emphasis on Romantic and Impressionist composers.

== History ==
The trend emerged on social media site Tumblr around 2014 and 2015. The initial trend was centered around the fandom of American writer Donna Tartt's 1992 novel The Secret History, which tells the story of a murder that takes place within a group of classics students at a New England liberal arts college and features themes around "a morbid longing for the picturesque at all costs." Murray has argued that the book's prominence as the aesthetic's ur-text comes from its "memorably lush and louche mise-en-scene," including its use of gothic tropes and its depiction of socio-economic class.

Around 2017, the aesthetic began to achieve a degree of prominence on Instagram and Pinterest.

In the early 2020s, dark academia rose in popularity during the COVID-19 pandemic. Increased interest in dark academia has been credited to the shutdown of schools. According to Adriaansen, during the pandemic, dark academia "offered distraction, meaningful offline and online activities, and a sense of purpose," functioning as "a digital and idealized replacement of academia, and physical travel restrictions were supplanted with new intellectual and historical worlds to explore." The spread of the aesthetic to TikTok during the early 2020s also contributed to its rise in popularity.

== Analysis ==
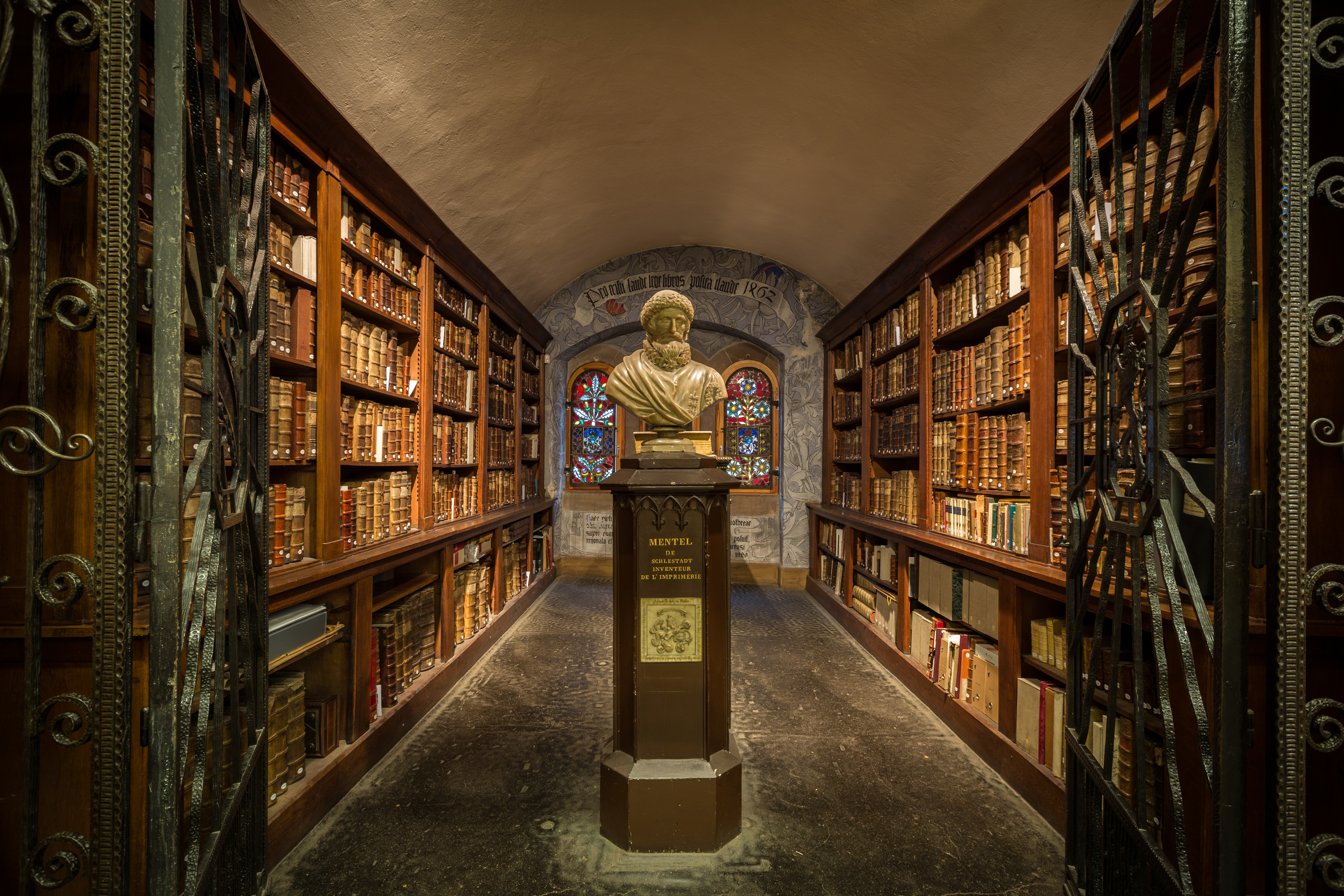
The Humanist Library of Sélestat, France

=== Comparisons to other aesthetics ===
One writer compared it to the contemporary cottagecore lifestyle aesthetic, saying that while cottagecore requires a home in the country and leisure time for crafting, dark academia's "simple act of putting on a blazer and reading Dostoevsky is far more doable."

In part in reaction to the growth of the subculture, the related "light academia" subculture has experienced a rise in popularity, often featuring lighter and softer imagery and colours and more overt emphasis on optimism, together with different style of "academia" aesthetics, like "gothic academia", "chaotic academia" or "green academia".

=== As a reaction to neoliberalism ===
Some commentators have attributed the rise in popularity of the subculture as a reaction to cuts to university funding and the corporatisation of higher education. Honi Soit writer Ezara Norton stated that it "reveals a deep disillusionment with [education models that devalue knowledge unless it can be used to generate profit], and a longing for a space free to learn unencumbered by a neoliberal agenda." Book Riot writer Zoe Robertson stated that the subculture draws on "seductive depictions of shadowy extravagance" and reminds her "to see the rot in the foundations of an institution I can't stay away from, and build my own school in defiance."

Writing for socialist magazine Jacobin, Amelia Horgan argued that the trend was in part a response to the COVID-19 pandemic, which resulted in students leaving campuses to learn in their family homes where many did not have access to adequate study space, providing "a fantasy of the university experience" which they were unable to obtain. However, she also said that the world presented in the aesthetic was very different from that of the contemporary university, saying that trends in UK academia are an example of the impacts of neoliberal policies on education, including long hours and casualisation for teaching staff and students having to work multiple part-time jobs to cover their costs.

=== Criticism ===
Dark academia has been criticised for various reasons, including the aesthetic's perceived Eurocentrism, lack of diversity, and glamorisation of unhealthy lifestyle choices. Critics have argued that the literary canon from which it draws inspiration is an overwhelmingly white one, with Tim Brinkhof claiming that content creators associated with dark academia "prefer to discuss Oscar Wilde and Emily Dickinson over Toni Morrison or James Baldwin". Sarah Burton, a sociologist from City, University of London, noted that the aesthetic lacks representation of various groups including "most women, working class, people of colour, plus-sized, individuals with low economic or cultural capital, disability, caring and domestic activities and labour (especially the enjoyment of these), motherhood, queerness, and the everyday nature of academic life". In response to the aesthetic's lack of diversity, efforts have been made to incorporate literary works from black authors such as Langston Hughes into dark academia.

The sub-culture has also been criticised as elitist and as an "old money aesthetic". Drawing on the threefold typology of educational traditions outlined by Raymond Williams in his book The Long Revolution, Amelia Horgan has described dark academia as being rooted in the attitudes of "old humanists committed to preserving and sustaining a traditional and hierarchical culture while preserving the legacy of humanistic study." Amy Crawford of the University of Dundee has stated that the sub-culture "tends to romanticise European upper-class education." Kevin N. Dalby of the University of Texas at Austin has stated that "its association with higher learning and Ivy League schools, in particular, creates elitism that does not enable just anyone to be a part of the group." Conversely, other commentators have noted that fashion items associated with the trend are easily and cheaply sourced from thrift stores.

Others have argued that the aesthetic places too much emphasis on the aesthetic of art and higher education instead of proper study and analysis of these works, leading to misinterpretations of the source material. It has also faced criticism for potentially glamourising unhealthy behaviours, such as sleep deprivation, overworking, and substance misuse.

== See also ==
- Bohemianism
- Campus novel
- Classicism
- Cottagecore
- Dark Enlightenment
- Dark romanticism
- Goblincore
- Hauntology
- Light academia
- Neo-Victorian
- Romanticism
- Steampunk
- Whimsigoth
- Work ethic
