= Akademie =

German term for an educational institution

A German Akademie is a school or college, trade school or another educational institution. The word Akademie (unlike the words Gymnasium or Universität) is not protected by law, and any school or college may choose to call itself Akademie. A Sommerakademie (Summer Akademie) is a programme that teaches different groups of children or grown-ups, usually during the summer month. Sometimes those programmes are remedial in nature.

== Origin of the word ==
The word Akademie derives from the Platonic Academy, which was located near the bosk of Akademos.

== Examples of Akademies ==
- Akademie deutsches Bäckerhandwerk Weinheim
- Akademie für musische Bildung und Medienerziehung
- Akademie der Künste
- Akademie der bildenden Künste
