= The Late Americans =

2023 novel by Brandon Taylor

- First edition cover
- Author: Brandon Taylor
- Cover artist: Logan T. Sibrel (art); Stephanie Ross (design)
- Language: English
- Genre: Campus novel
- Set in: Iowa City
- Publisher: Riverhead Books
- Publication date: May 23, 2023
- Publication place: United States
- Media type: Print (hardcover and paperback), e-book, audiobook
- Pages: 320
- ISBN: 978-0-593-33233-7 (First edition hardcover)
- OCLC: 1317343139
- Dewey Decimal: 813/.6
- LC Class: PS3620.A93534 L38 2023

The Late Americans is a 2023 novel by American writer Brandon Taylor. The novel followed Taylor's critically acclaimed 2020 debut Real Life, as well as his 2021 short story collection Filthy Animals.

== Background ==
Taylor was inspired to write The Late Americans while contending with pressure to commodify his experiences as a queer Black southerner in his art. The novel began as a satirical short story revolving around Seamus, a character disdainful of the prominent role identity politics play in his peers' poetry, who would eventually become the center of the novel's first chapter. Though he wrote and sold the first draft of the book in 2019, Taylor nearly abandoned the project in 2021 due to feeling stuck with his characterization, and even went so far as to take up film photography as a replacement for writing. However, after a conversation with actor Lee Pace, whom he met through mutual friend Jeremy O. Harris, Taylor began to approach the novel through the lens of whether or not he cared about the character, giving Seamus a job and deepening the novel's focus on class.

Taylor felt compelled to write a novel strongly focused on character, partially out of frustration with contemporary fiction, which he feels often abandons memorable characterization in favor of "vibes". Additionally, Taylor felt obligated to write a novel that was more overtly class-conscious than Real Life, since both books are campus novels directly inspired by his experiences at the Iowa Writers' Workshop. He did this both to prevent his focus from becoming too narrow, and to reiterate just how much of his own college experience was informed by precarity, which he felt many critics overlooked in their coverage of his debut. In crafting the structure of the novel, Taylor took inspiration from Ann Patchett's Commonwealth, Karl Ove Knausgård's The Morning Star, and Mavis Gallant's short fiction. He has also compared the novel's view of a "symphony of lives" to the works of Émile Zola.

== Summary ==
The novel consists of a series of interlinked character studies that follow a group of college students living in Iowa City as they navigate class, relationships, career decisions, and artistic purpose. Each chapter focuses on the perspective of one specific character, though some characters make repeat appearances.

== Title ==
The title of The Late Americans was inspired by a reflection Taylor had while pursuing his Master of Fine Arts degree. "It all felt very rigged and cheap. I remember walking home one day, thinking: ‘It’s like we’re all in a museum exhibit called 'The Late Americans," he explained to The Guardian. Taylor himself has likened the title to that of the 1877 novel The American by Henry James, whom he has cited as one of his favorite authors. According to Taylor, the word "late" can refer to being dead, being tardy, or living under the current stage of late capitalism.

== Artwork ==
The novel's cover features a cropped version of the Logan T. Sibrel painting Chin Smooch. Taylor explained his choice of the painting to Oprah Daily, stating, "For me, it captures a real sense of intimacy and warmth," and added that the image "could be a kiss, it could be CPR. It could be this man is sleeping. I love that there can be all these different interpretations of what appears to be a familiar tender scene. That feels very much in step with the novel to me."

== Reception ==
Writing for NPR, Thúy Đinh lauded the book, saying: "Taylor deftly explores the myth of youth's unbound possibilities as it plays out in the face of constraints of time, space, class and wealth disparities by vividly illustrating the intersecting lives of University of Iowa students pursuing master degrees, in artistic as well as STEM-related fields, with the people living in this college town." For The Washington Post, Mark Athitakis praised Taylor's take on the campus novel, writing that he "observes this milieu with fresh eyes" and possesses a "bone-deep" empathy for his characters. In a more mixed review for Vox, Constance Grady wrote that "as we delve into the mind of each character in turn, it starts to become disconcertingly difficult to tell one from the other". Additionally, in a negative review for the Star Tribune, Claude Peck criticized the novel for "drift[ing] almost plotlessly" among its collection of characters.

Many critics, regardless of their opinion on the novel's quality as a whole, praised Taylor's depiction of the character Seamus. In The New York Times, Alexandra Jacobs referred to him as "the pick of the litter", and in Harper's Magazine, author Claire Messud described him as "hold[ing] the novel’s roiling, slow ground bass". Despite his negative view of the book, Peck wrote: "The big ideas raised by Seamus—Is his condemnation of today's woke academic culture valid? Is he blinded by his whiteness? His sexism? What is the correct role of the contemporary artist?—resonate most strongly in the scattershot mix."

Shortly after its release, The Late Americans became the subject of controversy when Laura Miller, writing for Slate, panned it on the grounds that Taylor's prose was not as engaging as his pithier social media presence. Miller also criticized the novel for "readily fulfill[ing] the stereotype of 'workshop fiction'—that is, character and relationship portraits that naturally assume an open-ended short-story form". In an episode of the Vulture podcast Into It, Taylor responded to Miller's review by saying: "It feels like what happens when we mistake our preoccupations for a valid critical lens."
