= The War Between the Tates =

1974 novel by Alison Lurie

War Between the Tates
- Cover of the first edition
- Author: Alison Lurie
- Language: English
- Publisher: Random House
- Publication date: 1974
- Publication place: United States
- Media type: Print (hardback and paperback)
- Pages: 372 pp (hardback edition)
- ISBN: 0-394-46201-7
- OCLC: 23366260
- Dewey Decimal: 813/.54 20
- LC Class: PS3562.U7 W37 1991

The War Between the Tates is a campus novel by Alison Lurie that takes place at an elite university during the upheavals of the late 1960s and gently and deftly skewers all sides in the turmoils and conflicts of that era — opposition to the Vietnam war, the start of the feminist movement, the generation gap, sexual liberation, experimentation with drugs, and student unrest.

== Synopsis ==
Erica and Brian Tate are a seemingly happy and successful academic couple. At least, Brian Tate is successful: he is the holder of the endowed Sayles Chair of Political Science at Corinth University in upstate New York. As he reaches his mid-40s, he begins to undergo a midlife crisis. He is an admirer and scholar of the work of George Kennan, the diplomat who devised President Harry Truman's policy of containment of the Soviet Union at the start of the Cold War.

Brian, meanwhile, ends up helping a group of young women (he is attracted in particular to one, the beautiful young student Wendy) who want to protest the sexist attitudes of Professor Dibble, a highly conservative colleague in Brian's department. Brian ends up futilely attempting to support both sides in this battle, to his own discomfiture. In the war between men and women, as in other wars, when the two sides are extremely polarized, there can be no middle ground, but there are contradictions on both sides.

== The War Between the Tates as a roman à clef ==
When The War Between the Tates was published in 1974, Lurie was a part-time adjunct teaching English at Cornell University where her husband was a full professor. The fictional Corinth University, with its setting of creeks flowing through deep gorges, gracious but not always comfortable academic buildings, and its shabby college town, is obviously modeled on Cornell.

In a 2005 interview in the Cornell Chronicle, Lurie maintained that her novel had been a composite:

The events in The War Between the Tates, her 1974 roman à clef of the marital (and extramarital) travails of a professor and his wife, 'happened to people I know, but it happened at three different universities.'" Nearly 25 years later, her colleague, Jonathan Culler, jokingly mentioned the fear in the Cornell English department that she might write a sequel to The War Between the Tates.

Lurie's novel, in fact, is only loosely based on the real people and events of the tumultuous 1960s, and her characters are the more devastating for being types rather than recognizable portraits. Although she was at Cornell during the famous protests by black students in April 1969, the topics dealt with in her book are feminism, the woes of parenthood, infidelity, and academic pomposity— not race relations. At the fictional "Corinth", instead exists a very funny takeover of the office of political science Professor Dibble by his irate female students. The character of Dibble, a reactionary and sexist with a heart condition, is thought to be based on the young Allen Bloom. In the novel, the character Dibble is outraged because the administration has failed to call for military assistance to deal with the protesters, in his mind thereby compromising "professorial dignity". The only (somewhat oblique) reference in the novel to the student takeover at Cornell occurs when the women protesters are depicted as being inspired by thoughts of what black students might do in a takeover situation similar to theirs. In The War Between the Tates, moreover, the repercussions are strictly personal, Brian Tate's, not Dibble's, professorial pomposity is punctured. Tate gets mixed up in the demonstration, at first on the side of the women, and then by unadvisedly trying to rescue his colleague, the terrified Dibble, from their blockade of his office. Some of Tate's mixed motivations are described this way:

Brian felt some sympathy for Jenny's cause. After all, Dibble probably had made some foolishly unprofessional remarks. He was a boor and a reactionary and Brian's longstanding enemy [Brian is a liberal], while Jenny was a beautiful young girl who admired him and would be grateful if he helped her to defeat their common enemy; Brian had already imagined some of the forms this gratitude might take.

Tate's attempt to help Dibble escape out of the window goes hilariously awry and attracts a large crowd. When Tate is discovered trapped together with Dibble, everyone mistakenly assumes that the demonstration was aimed at him and not Dibble, thus Tate inadvertently acquires the reputation of sexism, while Dibble, who really is a sexist, ironically escapes with no consequences. Dibble then resigns from the university in high dudgeon. Brian Tate becomes a symbol because he is photographed and appears this way in the media. He becomes a figure attracting support and opprobrium for views that he does not, in fact, hold, as the imagery of "culture wars" takes over people's attention.

== Main characters in The War Between the Tates ==
- Brian Tate, a professor holding an endowed chair of Political Science at Corinth University
- Erica Tate, his wife
- Wendy Gahagan, a graduate student at Corinth
- Sanford Finkelstein, aka Zed, a bookshop owner
- Leonard Zimmern, his wife Danielle, and their daughters Roo and Celia

== TV adaptation ==
In 1977, The War Between the Tates was made into a TV movie starring Elizabeth Ashley and Richard Crenna. The Rolling Stones lead singer Mick Jagger appeared in a cameo role as the campus radical Joe Freedom.

== See also ==
- Allan Bloom
- Culture wars
- Campus novel
