= Foreign Affairs (novel) =

1984 novel by Alison Lurie

- 1984 first edition
- Author: Alison Lurie
- Language: English
- Genre: Contemporary literature
- Publisher: Random House
- Publication date: August 1984
- Publication place: United States
- Media type: Print (hardback & paperback)
- Pages: 291 (hardback edition)
- ISBN: 0-394-54076-X (hardback edition)
- OCLC: 10724500
- Dewey Decimal: 813/.54 19
- LC Class: PS3562.U7 F6 1984

Foreign Affairs is a 1984 novel by American writer Alison Lurie that concerns itself with American academics in England. The novel won multiple awards, including the Pulitzer Prize for Fiction in 1985, and was nominated for the 1984 National Book Award.

== Plot summary ==
Unmarried fifty-four-year-old Virginia Miner (Vinnie), a professor at Corinth University who specializes in children's literature, is off to London for another research trip. She is hoping to produce a new book about playground rhymes. However, she finds that her work has been trashed by a critic, L. D. Zimmern of Columbia, for whom she imagines dooms.

Her serenity on the flight is ruffled by her seatmate, a garrulous married man from Tulsa, Chuck Mumpson. She puts him off by giving him Little Lord Fauntleroy to read. But smoking, drinking, loudly American Chuck is persistent, and ends up contacting her in London. He has been inspired by Little Lord Fauntleroy to want to trace his own family history. Vinnie slowly becomes involved with his project, and then with him.

Meanwhile, her young colleague Fred Turner has left his wife Roo at home for his own sabbatical in London, where he is researching John Gay. Fred and Roo have quarreled and he fears the marriage is over. He consoles himself with the affections of a beautiful TV actress, Lady Rosemary Radley, who gives him the entree into London high life. The exquisite but not so young Rosemary has never managed to have a really successful love relationship, though she is not resigned to this, as Vinnie is. Although Fred is in love with her, he cannot give her the commitment she wants since he must return to Corinth to teach summer school. Rosemary also has a concealed side to her personality that her friends wish to keep hidden from the public, and from journalists including contributors to Private Eye, who lampoon her as "Rosalie Raddled". When Fred encounters this side of her, the friends close ranks and shut him out.

Quite by accident and with the encouragement of Chuck, Vinnie becomes an emissary for Fred's estranged wife in a midnight walk on Hampstead Heath. What makes this favor more challenging for Vinnie is that Roo's father is the nefarious critic L. D. Zimmern.

Just as she begins to think Chuck's affections have cooled, Vinnie is visited by his daughter who describes his sudden death while climbing the stairs of a small town hall. When an English friend speaks condescendingly of Chuck, Vinnie realizes with surprise that he loved her and she loved him. She returns to her life in Corinth.

== Awards and nominations ==
The novel won the Pulitzer Prize for Fiction in 1985. It was also nominated for the 1984 National Book Award for fiction and the 1984 National Book Critics Circle Award for fiction.
