= Light academia =

Literary genre; light counterpart to dark academia

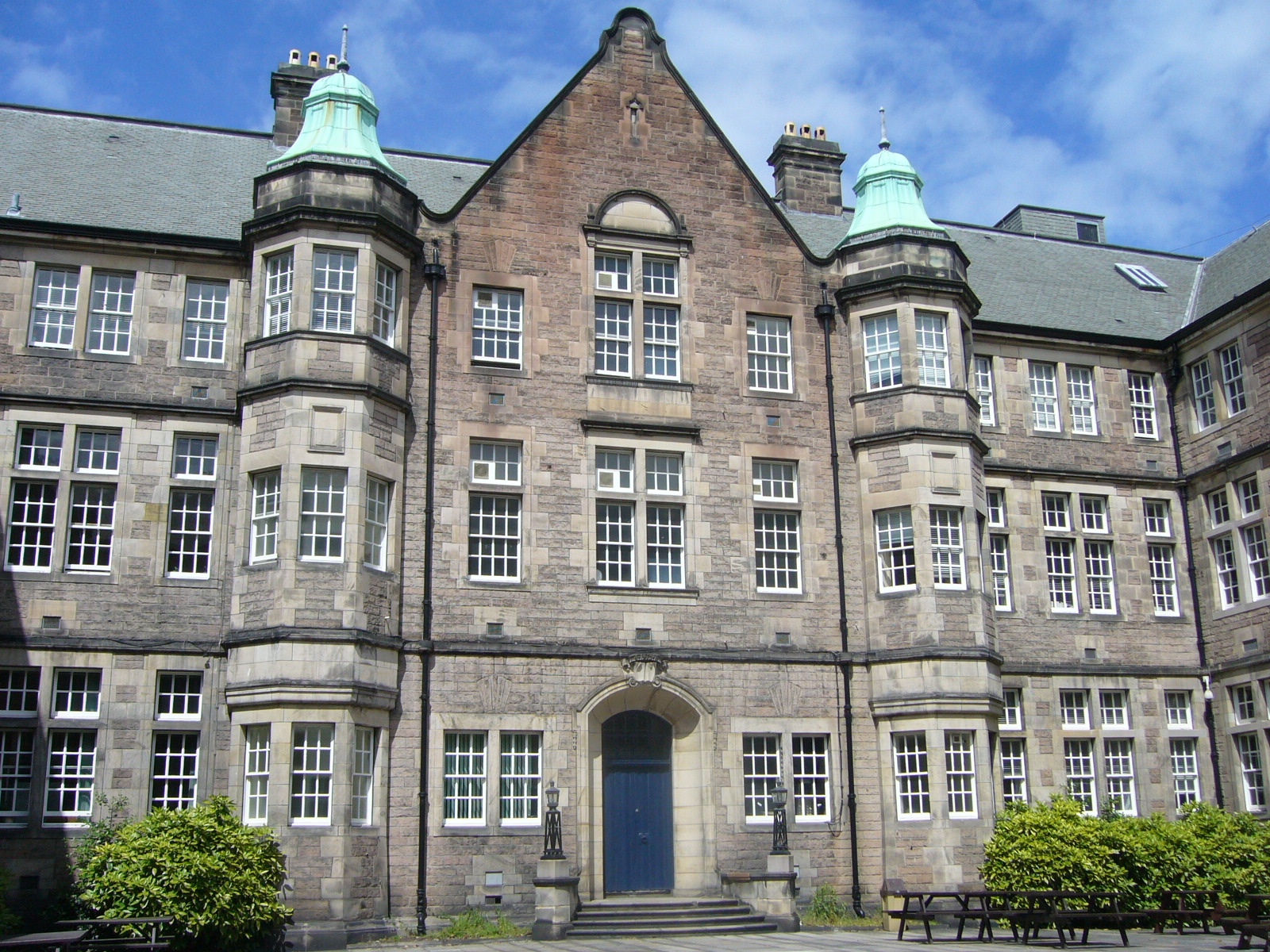
Architecture associated with light academia

Light academia is an aesthetic and subculture, that emphasizes visually light aesthetics and positive themes, including optimism, joy, and friendship. Accordingly, light academia is often considered to be the visually and emotionally lighter counterpart to dark academia. The term light academia was coined on Tumblr in 2019 and gained popularity during the early 2020s.

== History ==
=== Origin ===
The term light academia was coined on Tumblr in 2019 by the user 'plantaires,' who wrote:

"You've heard of 'dark academia', now its time for 'light' academia… wearing light linen sundresses in foreign countries, eating picnics and pastries in the afternoon sun while reading poetry and laughing with your friends, the burning passion and excitement when you finally make a breakthrough in your research, falling asleep in your lovers arms sunkissed and happy… everything is beautiful and hopeful and no one dies".

Comparing it to dark academia, Tumblr trend analyzer Amanda Brennan has stated that light academia "still embodies the love of learning, but with an airier, less doom-focused feel that shows that knowledge brings light and happiness in the outdoors rather than a gothic darkness seen curled up in a corner".

=== Popularity ===
By the end of 2020, light academia was ranked seventh for Tumblr's top ten aesthetics. By the end of 2021, light academia was the third most popular aesthetic on Tumblr.

On Pinterest, the number of users tagging the terms 'Light Academia clothing" and "Light Academia clothes" increased 236-fold by December 2022, compared to December 2021.

On Depop, searches for "Light Academia" increased by 900% by October 2022.

== Aesthetics ==
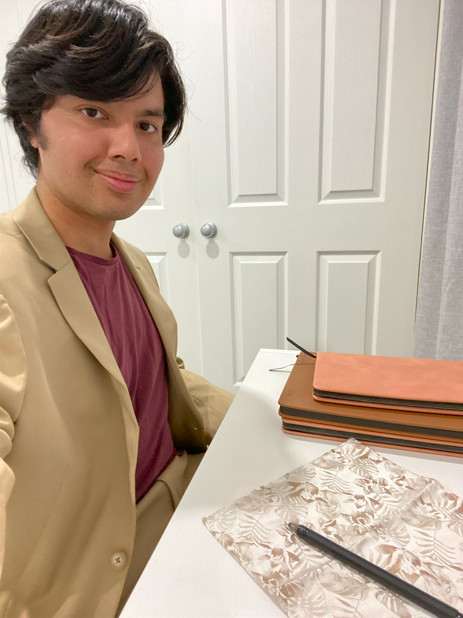
Light academia uses a neutral and earthy color palette.

Light academia utilizes a neutral and earthy color palette consisting of white, beige, and brown. Clothing items associated with light academia include pleated skirts, dress shirts, sweater vests, cardigans, turtlenecks, and hair ribbons. Light academia clothing has been described as "cottagecore with some more cosmopolitan elements", and as taking inspiration from school uniforms and early to mid-20th-century college wear.

== Media ==
Literature that has been classified as light academia includes the novels Brideshead Revisted, Never Let Me Go and Little Women, and manga series Little Witch Academia. Films classified as light academia include Call Me by Your Name (2017), Persuasion (2022), and Pride & Prejudice (2005). Light academia television series include Netflix's Anne with an E, Derry Girls, Gilmore Girls, and Netflix originals Bridgerton, Heartstopper, and Sex Education.

== See also ==
- Dark academia
- Cottagecore
