= The Groves of Academe =

1952 novel by Mary McCarthy

- First edition
- Author: Mary McCarthy
- Language: English
- Publisher: Harcourt, Brace
- Publication date: 1952
- Publication place: United States
- Media type: Print
- Pages: 302

The Groves of Academe is a 1952 academic novel by American writer Mary McCarthy.

The novel concerns the events that take place after Henry Mulcahy, a literary instructor at the fictitious Jocelyn College, learns that his teaching appointment will not be renewed. The novel is intended as a satire of academics based on the author's teaching experiences at Bard and Sarah Lawrence Colleges. The book is prefaced by a quote from Horace's Epistles, Atque inter silvas academi quaerere verum, which translates from the Latin as "And seek for truth in the groves of Academus." The book's first chapter, "An Unexpected Letter," originally appeared in The New Yorker.

The work is written in the third person, omniscient narrative mode and begins from Henry Mulcahy's perspective, but later focuses on the perspectives of the other faculty members, particularly Domna Rejnev.

== Characters ==
- Henry Mulcahy is the literature instructor and Joyce expert around whom the story revolves. Though portrayed at first as a sympathetic character, he is later revealed to be manipulative, duplicitous, and self-serving.
- Maynard Hoar is the President of Jocelyn College, and the man responsible for Mulcahy's dismissal.
- Howard Furness is the chairman of Jocelyn's literature department.
- Domna Rejnev, a young woman from Russia, is the youngest member of the literature department and the first of the faculty to hear of Mulcahy's woes.
