= Varsity novel =

Literary genre

A varsity novel is a novel whose main action is set in and around the campus of a university and focuses on students rather than faculty. Examples include Evelyn Waugh's Brideshead Revisited, Donna Tartt's The Secret History, Tom Sharpe's Porterhouse Blue and Stephen Fry's The Liar and Making History. Novels that focus on faculty rather than students are often considered to belong to a distinct genre, termed campus novels.

Aida Edemariam, analyzing David Lodge's novels, identifies that varsity novels "[are] set at Oxbridge, and usually among students." For his part, Lodge considers that the varsity novel was called as such "[b]efore World War II...[relating] the exploits of young men at Oxbridge, of which Max Beerbohm's Zuleika Dobson was a classic instance, and the first section of Evelyn Waugh's Brideshead Revisited was perhaps the swan-song." However, The National's Malcolm Forbes, asserts "that...all modern varsity novels, have an antecedent in Brideshead Revisited." Furthermore, Forbes considers, that the "[t]he prime example...is Donna Tartt's debut The Secret History (1992), a critical and commercial success that spawned several imitators, the most notable being Marisha Pessl's Special Topics in Calamity Physics." Forbes considers that Benjamin Wood, in his debut novel The Bellwether Revivals, "does for Cambridge what Evelyn Waugh does for Oxford." Another debut novel that falls under this genre is N. D. Williams' Ikael Torass. An early representative of the varsity novel is Edward Bradley's The Adventures of Mr. Verdant Green, while a later example is Tom Wolfe's I Am Charlotte Simmons.

For his part, Geoffrey Wheatcroft, states that by the publication of Kingsley Amis' Lucky Jim (1954), a campus novel, asserts that "the varsity novel was well established in England, often marked by lushly sentimental reminiscence of gilded undergraduate life, as in Sinister Street by Compton Mackenzie or Waugh's Brideshead Revisited."

Frederic Raphael's The Glittering Prizes is a varsity novelization from the television series of the same name. Philip Tew's The Gift of Death, a novel he turned in for his thesis, "reworks the tradition of [both] the campus or varsity novel, detailing lives tied to the rhythms of the academy." A noted female writer was "Alan St. Aubyn, a pseudonym for Mrs. Frances Marshall, [who] wrote women's "varsity novels"." Though Rikki Ducornet's Brightfellow has been called "perhaps her most accessible book," it is also considered "the oddest of varsity novels."

The university setting may be a real institution or a fictional university.
