= Minor Black Figures =

2025 novel by Brandon Taylor

- Author: Brandon Taylor
- Language: English
- Genre: Literary fiction
- Publisher: Riverhead Books
- Publication date: October 14, 2025
- Publication place: United States
- Media type: Print
- Pages: 387
- ISBN: 9780593332368

Minor Black Figures is a 2025 novel by American writer Brandon Taylor. The book follows Wyeth, a gay Black painter in New York City who begins a relationship with a former priest while grappling with questions of art, faith, and the cultural politics of representation. The novel was published by Riverhead Books in October 2025.

== Synopsis ==
Wyeth, a young Black painter living in New York, grapples with a creative block and the pressures of an art world that commodifies identity while he works at a gallery and assists an art restorer. After meeting Keating, a former Catholic seminarian, the two begin a relationship marked by debates about faith, sex, and art over a charged New York summer. Meanwhile, amid his restoration work, Wyeth investigates the life and career of a forgotten Black artist, leading him to question what it means to be a Black artist making Black art.

== Reception ==
Minor Black Figures, Taylor's third novel, received praise for its character development and portrayals of both human relationships and political culture. Kirkus Reviews gave it a starred review and called the book a "piercing, precise, and affecting tale of young love and high art". Library Journal (starred review) praised it as "a brilliant and bold study" of the impact of race on art and artistic spaces and the representation of Black bodies.

Chicago Review of Books emphasized the novel's breadth across love, religion, and the contemporary art world, and David Canfield for The New York Times wrote that Minor Black Figures is Taylor's most accomplished novel.

Vulture's Tembe Denton-Hurst offered a critical assessment of the novel, arguing the novel reinforces racial hierarchies through its protagonist's relationship to whiteness. The Guardian was also more critical, with Sukhdev Sandhu arguing that the novel is “stacked with ideas about Black art and aesthetics” but that its language is too clumsy and academic to fully bring them to life.
