= Alison Lurie =

American novelist and academic (1926–2020)

- Alison Lurie in 1981
- Born: Alison Stewart Lurie; September 3, 1926; Chicago, Illinois, U.S.
- Died: December 3, 2020 (aged 94); Ithaca, New York, U.S.
- Education: Harvard University (BA)
- Occupations: Novelist; academic
- Spouse(s): Jonathan Bishop (m. 1948; div. 1985) Edward Hower
- Children: 3
- Writing career
- Period: 1962–2020
- Notable awards: Pulitzer Prize for Fiction (1985)

Alison Stewart Lurie (September 3, 1926 – December 3, 2020) was an American novelist and academic. She won the Pulitzer Prize for Fiction for her 1984 novel Foreign Affairs. Although better known as a novelist, she wrote many non-fiction books and articles, particularly on children's literature and the semiotics of dress.

== Life ==
Alison Stewart Lurie was born on September 3, 1926, in Chicago, and raised in White Plains, New York. Her father Harry Lawrence Lurie was a sociologist, and her mother Bernice Lurie (née Stewart) was a journalist and book critic. Her father was born in Latvia and her mother was born in Scotland. Her father was the first executive director of the National Council of Jewish Federations and Welfare Funds. Due to complications with a forceps delivery, she was born deaf in one ear and with damage to her facial muscles. She attended a boarding school in Darien, Connecticut, and graduated from Radcliffe College of Harvard University in 1947 with a bachelor's degree in history and literature.

Lurie met literary scholar Jonathan Peale Bishop while in college, and they married in 1948. Bishop later taught at Amherst College and Cornell University, and Lurie moved along with him. They had three sons and divorced in 1984. She then married the writer Edward Hower. She spent part of her time in Hampstead, London; part in Ithaca, New York; and part in Key West, Florida.

In 1970, Lurie began to teach in the English department at Cornell, where she was tenured in 1979. She taught children's literature and writing. In 1976, she was named the F. J. Whiton Professor of American Literature at Cornell, and upon retirement, professor emerita. In 1981, she published The Language of Clothes, a non-fiction book about the semiotics of dress. Her discussion in Language of Clothes has been compared to Roland Barthes' The Fashion System (1985).

Lurie died from natural causes while under hospice care in Ithaca on December 3, 2020, at age 94.

Lurie's personal papers are archived at Cornell University.

== Themes ==
Lurie's novels often featured professors in starring roles, and were frequently set at academic institutions. With their light touch and focus on portraying the emotions of well-educated adulterers, her works bear more resemblance to some 20th-century British authors (such as Kingsley Amis and David Lodge) rather than to the major American authors of her generation. A 2003 profile of Lurie, styled as a review of her Boys and Girls Forever, a work of criticism, observed that Lurie's works are often "witty and astute comedies of manners". Lurie noted that her writing was grounded in a "desire to laugh at things". The author also incorporated some of her own experiences into her fiction. In The Nowhere City, there is a character based on actress Sheree North. "I did have a job answering her fan mail," Lurie recalled. Lurie also used some of Sheree's friends as characters but "tried to change them all a little, so as not to annoy anybody."

Literary critic John W. Aldridge gave a mixed assessment of Lurie's oeuvre in The American Novel and the Way We Live Now (1983). He notes that Lurie's work "has a satirical edge that, when it is not employed in hacking away at the obvious, is often eviscerating", but also remarks that "there is … something hobbled and hamstrung about her engagement in experience".

== Bibliography ==
=== Novels ===
- Love and Friendship (1962)
- The Nowhere City (1966)
- Imaginary Friends (1967)
- Real People (1969)
- The War Between the Tates (1974)
- Only Children (1979)
- Foreign Affairs (1984)
- The Truth About Lorin Jones (1988)
- The Last Resort (1998)
- Truth and Consequences (2005)

=== Short Story Collection ===
- Women and Ghosts (1994)

=== Children's collections ===
- The Oxford Book of Modern Fairy Tales (1975)
- Clever Gretchen and Other Forgotten Folktales (1980)
- Fabulous Beasts
- The Heavenly Zoo
- The Black Geese
- The Cat Agent (2023)

=== Non-fiction ===
- The Language of Clothes (1981)
- Don't Tell the Grown-Ups (1990)
- Familiar Spirits (2001)
- Boys and Girls Forever (2003)
- The Language of Houses: How Buildings Speak to Us (2014):
- Words and Worlds: From Autobiographies to Zippers (2019)

== Awards and honors ==
- 1963–1964: Yaddo Foundation fellow
- 1965: Guggenheim Foundation fellow
- 1966: Yaddo Foundation fellow
- 1967: Rockefeller Foundation fellow
- 1978: American Academy of Arts and Letters literary award
- 1985: Pulitzer Prize for fiction
- 1989: Prix Femina Étranger
- 1989: elected member of the American Academy of Arts and Letters
- 2005: elected member of the American Academy of Arts and Sciences
- 2006: University of Oxford honorary degree
- 2007: University of Nottingham honorary degree
- 2012–2014: New York State Author

== Sources ==
- Aldridge, John W. (1983). The American Novel and the Way We Live Now. New York: Oxford University Press. ISBN 9780195031980. OCLC 1028027804.
- Edwards, Tim (2010). Fashion in Focus: Concepts, Practices and Politics. London: Taylor & Francis. doi:10.4324/9780203836880. ISBN 978-1-136-86660-9.
- Rollyson, Carl E., ed. (2012). Novelists with Gay and Lesbian Themes. Ipswich, Massachusetts: Salem Press. ISBN 9781429836777. OCLC 1150977330.
