= Japanese by Spring =

1993 novel by Ishmael Reed

- First edition
- Author: Ishmael Reed
- Language: English
- Genre: Satire
- Publisher: Atheneum
- Publication date: 1993
- Publication place: United States
- ISBN: 0689120729
- Preceded by: The Terrible Threes
- Followed by: Juice!

Japanese by Spring is a 1993 novel by American author Ishmael Reed. It is a campus novel and satire of American university culture, particularly the culture wars. It was reviewed in several major national newspapers and magazines, and its themes of multiculturalism and multilingualism have been the subject of academic analysis.

== Plot summary ==
Benjamin "Chappie" Puttbutt, a professor at Jack London College in Oakland, California, becomes the target of racist attacks from the Neo-Nazi editor of the campus newspaper. Worried that he will lose his middle-class lifestyle if people see him as a black activist, Chappie responds by recommending to the campus president that nothing be done. Instead, he focuses on learning Japanese using the textbook Japanese by Spring, which he is studying with Mr. Yamato, a Japanese-language teacher, in the belief that speaking Japanese will give him an advantage when the rising Japanese economy results in Japanese companies and culture taking over large parts of American society.

One day Chappie discovers that Japanese investors have purchased the college, and that his Japanese teacher is the new college president. Based on their personal connection, Yamato appoints Chappie to a new administrative position, from which he begins to take revenge against every aspect of the college that has bothered him, including unproductive tenured professors, overpaid fad-pursuing intellectuals, and the political activists who have opposed Chappie's tolerance of racism on campus. Yamato follows his own plans to reform Jack London College as a bastion of Japanese nationalism, including renaming the college after Japanese war heroes and creating a Pearl Harbor Day holiday.

Chappie's fortunes change again when Yamato is arrested for plotting to overthrow the Japanese Emperor. Ishmael Reed, a new character, follows the news as Chappie denounces Yamato. Reed then reports a series of observations and visions: Americans enact white affirmative action laws to oppose the Japanese; Japanese investments and dominance begin to decline; and a new multiculturalism based on Yoruba culture begins to arise in America.

== Major themes ==
Academic analysis of the book has focused on its use of satire to criticize monoculturalism and illustrate the value of multiculturalism. Kenneth Womack's academic analysis of Reed's insertion of himself as a character into Japanese by Spring suggested that Reed's literary technique was meant to elevate his own multiculturalist perspective over any form of monoculturalism, including Eurocentrism, Afrocentrism, and feminism, with the result that Reed's novel could also be criticized as misogynist. In a Modern Fiction Studies analysis of the novel's themes of multiculturalism, Jeehyun Lim proposed that the use of different languages in the novel reflected Reed's ambivalence toward capitalism, observing that Japanese by Spring presents a multiculturalism grounded in the Yoruba language as an alternative to a multiculturalism based on multilingualism in English and Japanese, the languages of competing capitalists. Crystal Anderson analyzed Japanese by Spring as a form of trickster narrative, in which the story creates meaning from the experiences of a particular ethnic group, but also "privileges access to and use of multiple cultural spheres". However, Anderson criticized Reed's use of Japanese characters simply to support a story about Blacks and whites in the United States, noting that Japanese by Spring relied on "prejudices of a different era" rather than directly confronting Black-Japanese relationships with realistic characters and cultural representations.

== Background ==
Reed wrote several novels in the 1980s and 1990s that addressed the rise of neoconservatism and multiculturalism in American politics and academic life, and Japanese by Spring has similar settings and characters to predecessor novels The Terrible Twos, Reckless Eyeballing, and The Terrible Threes, with especially strong plot similarities to Reckless Eyeballing. According to Reed, Japanese by Spring was inspired by a news story about a major university that had been secretly funded by a Japanese organized crime syndicate. Using a Japanese takeover of an American university as a "science-fiction element", he wrote Japanese by Spring to challenge the idea of multiculturalism as a response to Afrocentric and Eurocentric perspectives.

== Reception ==
The book received mixed reviews. Reviewers praised Reed's courage in tackling difficult subjects, with the Chicago Tribune saying: "Reed isn't foolhardy, but he is about as brave as can be." The New York Times concluded that "this clever, outrageous novel is just the sort of weapon we need in the war against academic pedantry". However, reviewers also criticized the book's ending, with The Washington Post noting that Japanese by Spring "lapses into the kind of artless agitprop that still too much afflicts even newer generations of the old Negro Problem Novel", and The Times Literary Supplement concluding that "if this writing is jazz-like, it's an improvised set that keeps forgetting what tunes it started out being based on". Reviewing the book for the academic journal MELUS, international relations scholar Tsunehiko Kato criticized Reed for exaggerating and mischaracterizing Japanese right-wing movements, and for creating "the impression that he is the only one doing the right thing", ultimately concluding that Reed's understanding of Japan was based on "stereotypes of old Japan" and an unhelpful portrayal of modern Japan in terms of its economic relationship to the United States.

== Works cited ==
- Anderson, Crystal S. (2004). "Racial Discourse and Black-Japanese Dynamics in Ishmael Reed's Japanese by Spring". MELUS. 29 (3/4): 379–396. doi:10.2307/4141862. JSTOR 4141862.
- Brown, Kevin (March 21, 1993). "Reed's Riffs". The Washington Post. p. X06.
- Cunningham, Valentine (July 15, 1994). "Learning to get on". The Times Literary Supplement. No. 4763. p. 22.
- Dickson-Carr, Darryl (1999). "The Next Round: Ishmael Reed's Battles in the 1980s and 1990s". The Critical Response to Ishmael Reed. Greenwood Press. pp. 214–228. ISBN 9780313300257.
- Garrett, George (April 11, 1993). "Ishmael Reed's academy: Dancing through the 'politicized minefields' of American college life". Chicago Tribune. p. 3.
- Howell, Patrick A. (April 14, 2018). "Ishmael Reed". Into the Void. Archived from the original on November 9, 2020.
- Hower, Edward (March 7, 1993). "Blood on the Syllabus". The New York Times.
- Kato, Tsunehiko (1993). "Japanese by Spring. Ishmael Reed". MELUS. 18 (4): 125–127. doi:10.2307/468125. JSTOR 468125.
- Lim, Jeehyun (2014). "Multilingualism and multiculturalism in Ishmael Reed's Japanese by Spring". Modern Fiction Studies. 60 (4): 821–843. doi:10.1353/mfs.2014.0053. S2CID 143490847.
- Warren, Tim (February 20, 1993). "For writer Ishmael Reed, Fightin' words come easy". The Baltimore Sun.
- Womack, Kenneth (2001). "Campus Xenophobia and the Multicultural Project: Ethical Criticism and Ishmael Reed's Japanese by Spring". MELUS. 26 (4): 223–243. doi:10.2307/3185548. JSTOR 3185548.
