= Cow Country (novel) =

2015 novel published pseudonymously

- Author: Adrian Jones Pearson
- Cover artist: Phil Poole
- Language: English
- Genre: Literary fiction
- Publisher: Cow Eye Press
- Publication place: United States
- Media type: Print (hardcover)
- Pages: 540
- ISBN: 978-0-990-91502-7

Cow Country (2015) is a novel written under the pseudonym Adrian Jones Pearson and published by Cow Eye Press. It centers on the fortunes of a down-on-his-luck educational administrator at the fictional Cow Eye Community College.

== Plot ==
Built around a cattle industry now in decline, the town of Cow Eye Junction is experiencing a severe drought, a demographic incursion, and an ongoing cultural clash as older residents are displaced by a new wave of outsiders moving in. The college, meanwhile, is struggling to maintain its accreditation and to reconcile two rival factions: those who eat meat, and those who will not. Hoping to resolve this situation, the college hires the narrator, Charlie, to serve as Special Projects Coordinator. Struggling to find his place in life as a self-described "habitual divorcee and father of nothing," Charlie is repeatedly drawn into outlandish situations over the course of the novel as he tries to help the college achieve regional accreditation, reconcile a divided faculty, and resurrect the college's annual Christmas party.

== Authorship ==
Cow Country is attributed to the author Adrian Jones Pearson, which is a pseudonym. The novel drew attention in September 2015 when Art Winslow, the longtime Nation books editor, argued in Harper's Magazine that it is the work of the American author Thomas Pynchon. Nate Jones at Vulture argued against Pynchon's authorship; he contacted Penguin Books directly and was told: "We are Thomas Pynchon's publisher and this is not a book by Thomas Pynchon." David Marks at Writer's Quarterly drew on certain consistencies to argue that the books was written by Jacob M. Appel, writing that there are thematic similarities in Appel's short story collection Einstein's Beach House, published within six months of Cow Country. Marks observed that the website "cowcountry.com" had previously been registered under the name "J. Appel." Laura Well speculates that the novel is actually a collective work of multiple authors.

The Associated Press traced the website of the book's publisher, Cow Eye Press, to the name Anthony Perry. The critic L. Best wrote that Anthony Perry is a journalist who, in the past, has written about conspiracy theories regarding Pynchon in various newspapers, including the Los Angeles Times. Best says that "A Perry" is a recurring character in the stories of Jacob Appel. Alex Shepard, writing for the New Republic, argues for identifying the author as A. J. Perry rather than Pynchon.

== Reception ==
Initially, the volume was reviewed only on a limited scale. The San Francisco Book Review wrote, "With quirky characters and impossible situations, Cow Country handles drought, institutional lunacy, racism, and romance with deft insight, as well as keen-edged satirical commentary." The Midwest Book Review described it as a "tour de farce." Kirkus called the book "Ambitious in its creation of this kooky world, the book will certainly strike a chord with readers lost in their own wacky arenas of academic bickering."

In March 2017, it was announced that Cow Country was included in the long list for the Yasnaya Polyana Foreign Fiction Award, which is given annually by the estate of Leo Tolstoy.
