= Brandon Taylor (writer) =

American writer (born 1989)

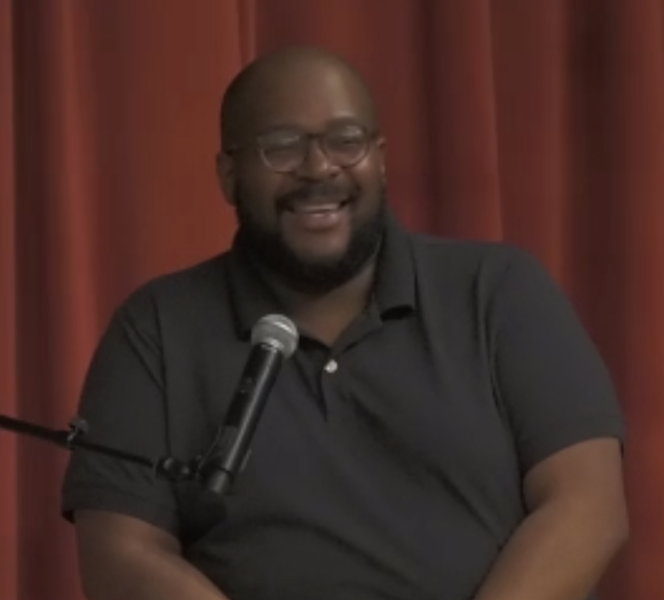
- Born: June 1, 1989 (age 37); Prattville, Alabama, U.S.
- Education: Auburn University at Montgomery (BS); University of Wisconsin–Madison (MS); Iowa Writers' Workshop (MFA)
- Occupation: Writer
- Writing career
- Period: 2020–present
- Notable works: Real Life (2020); Filthy Animals (2021)
- Notable awards: The Story Prize (2022)
- Website: brandonlgtaylor.com

Brandon Taylor (born June 1, 1989) is an American writer. He holds graduate degrees from the University of Wisconsin–Madison and the University of Iowa and has received several fellowships for his writing. His short stories and essays have been published in many outlets and have received critical acclaim. His debut novel, Real Life, came out in 2020 and was shortlisted for the Booker Prize. In 2022, Taylor's book Filthy Animals won The Story Prize awarded annually to collections of short fiction.

== Early life and education ==
Taylor was born in Prattville, Alabama, and grew up in a small community outside Montgomery. Part of Taylor's upbringing was spent in a very religious, conservative Baptist setting. Taylor's family is mostly illiterate, and he was often made to read his parents' medical bills and government forms. He taught himself how to read using his brother's textbooks, and grew up reading a combination of romance novels, his aunt's nursing-home manuals, and the Bible.

Taylor attended Auburn University at Montgomery as a chemistry major. He then enrolled in a PhD biochemistry program, but left to begin a career in creative writing. He received a Master of Science in biochemistry from the University of Wisconsin–Madison in 2017. He was an Iowa Arts Fellow at the Iowa Writers' Workshop, where he received his Master of Fine Arts in creative writing in 2019.

== Career ==
Taylor's short stories and essays have appeared in Granta, Guernica, American Short Fiction, Gulf Coast, Buzzfeed Reader, O: The Oprah Magazine, Gay, The New Yorker, The Literary Review, and elsewhere. He is the senior editor of Electric Literature's "Recommended Reading" and is a staff writer at Literary Hub. He has also contributed book reviews to The New York Times and 4Columns, having reviewed works by authors such as Sally Rooney, Emma Cline, and Banana Yoshimoto. He also wrote the introduction for Wading in Waist-High Water, a commentary book about the lyrics of Fleet Foxes.

In an interview for the Booker Prizes, Taylor said his influences were Mavis Gallant, André Aciman, Jane Austen, Alice Munro, Louise Glück, Elizabeth Bishop, Hilton Als, Pat Conroy and Ann Petry.

He received a fellowship from the Lambda Literary Foundation in 2017. He has also received fellowships for his writing from Kimbilio Fiction and the Tin House Summer Writer's Workshop.

Taylor was the 2022–2023 Mary Ellen von der Heyden Fellow at the Cullman Center at the New York Public Library.

=== Real Life ===
Taylor's debut novel, Real Life, was published in 2020 with Riverhead Books. He wrote the book in less than five weeks, and he later explained his approach: "I was like, I'm going to sit down and knock this out so I can get on with my life.... Writing a novel ruins your life in really specific ways. Because you have to live inside of it. It's just this sustained exercise in being miserable." It is "a campus novel imagined from the vantage of a character who is usually shunted to the sidelines... a gay black student from a small town in Alabama".

Real Life received critical acclaim. Describing Taylor's work in the Los Angeles Times, Bethanne Patrick wrote: "His voice might best be described as a controlled roar of rage and pain, its energy held together by the careful thinking of a mind accustomed to good behavior." According to the review of Real Life by Jeremy O. Harris in The New York Times, "It is a curious novel to describe, for much of the plot involves excavating the profound from the mundane. As in the modernist novels of Woolf and Tolstoy cited in passing throughout, the true action of Taylor's novel exists beneath the surface, buried in subterranean spaces." Michael Arceneaux wrote in Time: "Taylor's book isn't about overcoming trauma or the perils of academia or even just the experience of inhabiting a black body in a white space, even as Real Life does cover these subjects. Taylor is also tackling loneliness, desire and — more than anything — finding purpose, meaning and happiness in one's own life... How fortunate we are for Real Life, another stunning contribution from a community long deserving of the chance to tell its stories." Taylor himself has said: "I hope that it's a novel that challenges people to think about the ways that we fit together in our relationships with one another. I hope it makes people think really deeply about both the ways that they are harmed, and that they do harm to others."

Taylor's book tour to publicize his novel was cut short by the COVID-19 pandemic and associated restrictions on travel and public gatherings. Real Life was shortlisted for the 2020 Booker Prize. The New York Times included the novel on its list of "100 Notable Books of 2020".

In 2021, GQ reported that Real Life was being adapted into a movie featuring Kid Cudi.

=== Filthy Animals ===
In 2021, a collection of Taylor's stories, Filthy Animals, was published by Riverhead.

Filthy Animals was awarded The Story Prize in 2022. In the Los Angeles Review of Books, Thomas Mar Wee wrote in praise of the book: "Neither cold nor detached, these stories are suffused with a warmth and humanity that recalled for me the uncanniness of Raymond Carver, the empathy of Alice Munro, and the meticulous irony of Chekhov."

=== The Late Americans ===
Taylor's second novel, The Late Americans, was published in 2023. It follows a group of writers in Iowa City, where he lived while getting an MFA at the Iowa Writers' Workshop.

=== Minor Black Figures ===
In March 2025, Taylor announced the upcoming release of his third novel, Minor Black Figures, on his Substack newsletter Sweater Weather. The novel revolves around a gay Black painter as he navigates his artistic ambitions in New York City and becomes involved with a former Jesuit priest. In the same announcement, Taylor mentioned that he had abandoned the novel Group Show, after having struggled to finish it since 2018. Minor Black Figures was released on October 14, 2025, from Riverhead Books.

=== Other projects ===
A June 2023 article published in The Guardian reported that Taylor was working on novels entitled Group Show and Other Years, as well as a Southern Gothic project called Kinfolks. He stated in the article that he had found the process of writing Kinfolks particularly daunting, as it represented his first fictional foray into the rural environments of his youth.

On July 10, 2024, Publishers Weekly reported that Taylor is slated to publish two non-fiction books through Graywolf Press: one, a collection of literary criticism, due in fall 2026; the other, a book on the craft of writing, due in fall 2027. On the same day, Publishers Weekly also reported that Unnamed Press, an independent publisher for which Taylor serves as an acquiring editor, had formed the imprint Smith & Taylor Classics, which will be dedicated to publishing lesser-known works by acclaimed authors. Taylor and fellow Unnamed Press editor Allison Miriam Woodnutt (née Smith) are the imprint's namesakes.

== Personal life ==
As of 2022, Taylor lives in New York City. He is queer.

From 2021 to 2023, Taylor read all 20 novels in Émile Zola's Les Rougon-Macquart cycle after being commissioned to write a piece on the series for the London Review of Books. In the ensuing article, Taylor acknowledged how he deeply identified with the depiction of alcohol dependence portrayed in the novel L'Assommoir, likening it to the behavior he observed in his parents as a child. In the piece, he wrote:

The Assommoir is the most accurate, brutal depiction of the reality of alcoholism I have ever read, capturing too the strange, evil joviality that warps all the relationships in such a household. I found the book eerie and painful, and I wept at the end when Gervaise started to show physical symptoms similar to those I saw in my mother and father: the clumsiness, the persistent lack of memory, the tremors at all hours of the day.

== Awards ==
Literary Awards for Taylor's Writing
Year	Work	Award	Category	Result	Ref
2020	Real Life	Booker Prize	—	Shortlisted	
2020	Real Life	Center for Fiction First Novel Prize	—	Longlisted	
2020	Real Life	Foyles Books of the Year	Fiction	Won	
2020	Real Life	Goodreads Choice Awards	Fiction	Nominated—19th	
2020	Real Life	National Book Critics Circle Award	John Leonard Prize	Shortlisted	
2021	Real Life	ALA Over the Rainbow Book List	Fiction and Poetry	Longlisted	
2021	Real Life	Aspen Words Literary Prize	—	Longlisted	
2021	Real Life	Lambda Literary Award	Gay Fiction	Shortlisted	
2021	Real Life	Edmund White Award	—	Shortlisted	
2021	Real Life	Society of Midland Authors Award	Adult Fiction	Nominated	
2021	Real Life	Young Lions Fiction Award	—	Shortlisted	
2021	Filthy Animals	The Story Prize	—	Won	
2022	Filthy Animals	Dylan Thomas Prize	—	Shortlisted	
2023	The Late Americans	AudioFile's Best Audiobooks of the Year	Fiction	Selected	

== Bibliography ==
=== Novels ===
- —— (2020). Real Life. Riverhead Books. ISBN 9780525538882.
- —— (2023). The Late Americans. Riverhead Books. ISBN 9780593332337.
- —— (2025). Minor Black Figures. Riverhead Books. ISBN 9780593332368.

=== Collections ===
- —— (2021). Filthy Animals. Riverhead Books. ISBN 9780525538929.

=== Select short stories ===
- "French Absolutism", Joyland, 2017
- "Even If All Fall Away, I Will Not", Them, 2020
- "Prophets", Joyland, 2021
- "Little Beast", Oprah Daily, 2021
- "Warehouses", Joyland, 2023
