= Kevin N. Dalby =

American pharmacist

Kevin N. Dalby is an American pharmacist, who is currently the Johnson & Johnson Centennial Professor at University of Texas at Austin.
