= Real Life (novel) =

2020 debut novel by Brandon Taylor

- Cover of first edition
- Author: Brandon Taylor
- Audio read by: Kevin R. Free
- Language: English
- Genre: Fiction
- Publisher: Riverhead Books
- Publication date: February 18, 2020
- Publication place: United States
- Media type: Print (hardcover)
- Pages: 336
- ISBN: 978-0-525-53888-2
- OCLC: 1089003021
- Dewey Decimal: 813/.6
- LC Class: PS3620.A93534 R43 2020
- Website: Book website

Real Life is the 2020 debut novel of Alabama-born American writer Brandon Taylor. Described as a campus novel and a coming-of-age novel, the partly autobiographical book tells of the experiences of a gay, Black doctoral student in a predominantly White, Midwestern PhD program.

== Background ==
Real Life is Taylor's first novel; he is a "scientist turned novelist" who did his undergraduate studies at Auburn University Montgomery. Charles Arrowsmith, writing for The Washington Post, said that "Like many first novels, Real Life appears to hew to its author's own experience—Taylor has written in numerous personal essays about being gay and Southern, his abusive upbringing and his experiences of sexual violence. With a boilerplate disclaimer about reading too literally, the parallels between Taylor's life and Wallace's experiences seem clear". That, says Arrowsmith, is one rationale for the book's title, but another is that "real life" points at the supposed detachment of academic life from the world outside the university, the world of "getting a real job, real health insurance, taxes". Arrowsmith and Eren Orbey refer to Real Life as a "campus novel", albeit with a twist and of "a new kind", respectively. On NPR, it was announced as a "coming of age" novel.

== Plot ==
Wallace is a gay, Black student from a small town in Alabama who is enrolled in a PhD program in biochemistry at a predominantly White university in a Midwestern town. He is the first Black student admitted to the program in decades and is considering dropping out. The narrative starts shortly after one of Wallace's experiments (involving the culturing of nematodes) has gone wrong, and he suspects one of his fellow students of having sabotaged it. The novel takes place over the course of a weekend, which alternates between gatherings with his (White) friends, moments of solitude, a session in his lab, and a number of sexual encounters with his friend Miller. Further events from his past are narrated through flashbacks, including Wallace's learning of his father's death, his absence at the funeral, his difficult relationship with his mother, and the sexual abuse suffered at the hands of a family friend. Part of the recent trauma for Wallace is an experiment most likely ruined for him by a fellow White student, and when early in the novel Wallace is confronted with the likely sabotage of his nematodes experiment, he does not even try to make the case for foul play to his supervisor.

Wallace has sexual encounters with a fellow student called Miller, a young man who claims to be straight and initiates the affair, and throughout the narrative Wallace is trying to come to terms with his own mixed feelings. After their first night together, for instance, Wallace leaves without saying goodbye, and later struggles with his inability to see Miller as a human being who also deserves consideration and sympathy.

That Wallace is the only Black person in the program and one of only a few in the community is the cause of a few poignant scenes in the novel: being mistaken for a drug dealer at a campus store; attending a fundraising party for wealthy White patrons who in quiet voices discuss the changing demographics of the program; a visit to another student's house for a party, where at the door he is asked whether he is lost; and a French fellow student who suggests to him that he should be grateful to have a place in the program, since, he says, Black people should cherish and be grateful for the opportunities given to them. But Wallace also struggles to recognize when others have similar experiences, such as those of an Asian-American fellow student, whom he dismisses as he dismissed Miller—and then scolds himself for it.

== Reception ==
Fellow writers Roxane Gay, Garth Greenwell, and Danielle Evans praised the novel. Jeremy O. Harris wrote a "glowing review" in The New York Times. Eren Orbey, writing for The New Yorker, praised the novel for its depiction of Wallace's isolation, and for "endow[ing] his narrative with the precision of science and the intimacy of memoir". Rather than resorting to satire or having his main character complain about microaggressions, he illustrates the "relentless abrasion of dignity that is familiar to many people of color on such campuses". According to Orbey, while Wallace's removal from his friends, related through "disdainful observations", sometimes "reduce even a few of his better friends to the sort of schematic creations that appear under his microscope", his judgment usually feels fair, and Wallace implicates himself in this scheme.

Charles Arrowsmith says the "Real" of the title also points at "the insoluble, ineffable, capital-R 'Real' of philosophy", and that "what Wallace experiences as the unknowability of his friends and the inscrutability of his own actions are functions of this kind of Real-ism". These "ambiguities", according to Arrowsmith, "are what give Taylor's writing its strengths: his receptivity to menace in the mundane, subcutaneous sexual vibrations, unconscious motivation". He also admired that Taylor "deals deftly ... with what it's like to be different in an overculture. Gently, slyly, he makes a point of noticing 'white people,' undermining the unspoken rule of much realist fiction that race need only be mentioned when it's other than white", and that he "humorously invert[s]" racist tropes. Arrowsmith cared least for "self-consciously literary" aspects of Taylor's writing and for a certain unevenness in Wallace's character, but concluded that "with tighter editing and the autobiographical impulse out of his system, what Taylor does next will be worth watching".

Barbara VanDenburgh, writing for USA Today, chose it as one of nine LGBTQ books to read for Pride Month, and Laurie Muchnick, in Kirkus Reviews, selected it as one of six "queer debuts to read during Pride Month".

== Awards ==
| Year | Award | Category | Result | Ref |
|---|---|---|---|---|
| 2020 | Booker Prize | — | Shortlisted | |
| 2020 | Center for Fiction First Novel Prize | — | Longlisted | |
| 2020 | Foyles Books of the Year | Fiction | Won | |
| 2020 | Goodreads Choice Awards | Fiction | Nominated—19th | |
| 2020 | National Book Critics Circle Award | John Leonard Prize | Shortlisted | |
| 2021 | ALA Over the Rainbow Book List | Fiction and Poetry | Longlisted | |
| 2021 | Aspen Words Literary Prize | — | Longlisted | |
| 2021 | Lambda Literary Award | Gay Fiction | Shortlisted | |
| 2021 | Edmund White Award | — | Shortlisted | |
| 2021 | Society of Midland Authors Award | Adult Fiction | Nominated | |
| 2021 | Young Lions Fiction Award | — | Shortlisted | |
| 2022 | Alabama Author Award | Fiction | Won | |

== Film adaptation ==
On December 9, 2020, it was announced American musician Kid Cudi's Mad Solar company is developing an adaptation of the novel Real Life, with Cudi set to star. Bron Studios acquired the rights to the novel with Mad Solar. On October 15, 2021, Taylor revealed he had finished the first draft of the screenplay for the film.
