= Academus =

Ancient Greek mythological hero

Academus or Academos (/ˌækəˈdiːməs/; Ancient Greek: Ἀκάδημος, romanized: Akádemos), also Hecademus (Ancient Greek: Ἑκάδημος, romanized: Hekádemos), was an Attic hero in Greek mythology. The site of Academus, either a grove or a park, which became known as Akademeia, lies on the Cephissus, six stadia from Athens. He is the namesake of the Academy founded by Plato, who taught his students at the site, and as such of the modern English word academy, signifying an institution of higher learning.

== Place origins ==
Academus, the site, was sacred to Athena, the goddess of wisdom, and other immortals; it had since the Bronze Age sheltered her religious cult, which was perhaps associated with the hero-gods, the Dioskouroi (Castor and Polydeukes), and for the hero Akademos. By classical times the name of the place had evolved into the Akademeia. It had also earlier been called Ecademia (Ἑκαδημία).

According to Plutarch, Cimon converted this, "waterless and arid spot into a well watered grove, which he provided with clear running-tracks and shady walks". Its sacred grove furnished the olive oil that was distributed as prizes in the Panathenaic Games and contained in the finely decorated Panathenaic amphorae presented to the winners.

== Mythology ==
Plutarch, in his biography of the Athenian king Theseus (the slayer of the Minotaur), writes that, after being widowed and reaching age 50, the king abducted the 12-year-old child Helen (long before she married Menelaus, met Paris and was the cause of the Trojan War). Due to this outrage, her twin brothers Castor and Pollux invaded Attica to liberate their sister and threatened to destroy Athens. Academus saved the city by telling them where she was hidden, at Aphidnae. Also for this reason Tyndareus (a Spartan king and the father of Castor and stepfather of Helen) showed Academus much gratitude. As noted by Plutarch: "For this reason he was honored during his life by the Tyndaridae, and often afterwards when the Lacedaemonians invaded Attica and laid waste all the country round about, they spared the Academy, for the sake of Academus."

== Plato ==
Academe was the site of Plato's Academy and within its groves, he gave his lectures. According to Diogenes Laertius, Dion, "bought for Plato the little garden which is in the Academy". Diogenes Laertius, notes Timon of Phlius observes that there Plato "a big fish, but a sweet-voiced speaker, musical in prose as the cicada who, perched on the trees of Hecademus, pours forth a strain as delicate as a lily".

== Groves of Academe ==
The phrase "the groves of Academe" comes from Horace's Epistles, 20 b.c.): Atque inter silvas academi quaerere verum (To seek for truth in the groves of Academe)'. John Milton, in Paradise Regained book 4, 244-245, uses the phrase: "See there the Olive Grove of Academe, Plato's retirement, where the Attic Bird Trills her thick-warbl'd notes the summer long". Mary McCarthy made the phrase the title of her satirical novel The Groves of Academe.
