= Joshilyn Jackson =

American novelist

- Born: February 27, 1968 (age 58); Fort Walton Beach, Florida, U.S.
- Education: Georgia State University (BA); University of Illinois Chicago (MA)
- Occupation: Author
- Website: www.joshilynjackson.com

Joshilyn Jackson (born February 27, 1968) is an American author.

== Early life and education ==
Jackson was born in Fort Walton Beach, Florida. She graduated from Booker T. Washington High School in Pensacola, Florida, in 1986.

She attended several colleges before getting a two-year degree from Georgia Perimeter College and a BA in English literature from Georgia State University. She received an MA in creative writing from the University of Illinois Chicago in 1997.

Before starting her writing career, Jackson was an actor.

== Career ==
Jackson writes novels primarily in the thriller and Southern fiction genres, including A Grown-Up Kind of Pretty; Backseat Saints; The Girl Who Stopped Swimming; Between, Georgia; Gods in Alabama; Someone Else's Love Story; The Opposite of Everyone; The Almost Sisters; Never Have I Ever; Mother May I; and With My Little Eye. She has also written the novella My Own Miraculous. Jackson describes her writing style as "weirdo fiction" with a Southern Gothic influence and dark humor.

Jackson is a board member of Reforming Arts, a nonprofit organization which provides liberal arts education to women in Georgia prisons. She volunteer teaches creative writing classes at Arrendale State Prison.
