= Society of Midland Authors =

American authors' association

The Society of Midland Authors is an association of published authors from twelve American states: Illinois, Indiana, Iowa, Kansas, Michigan, Minnesota, Missouri, Nebraska, North Dakota, Ohio, South Dakota, and Wisconsin.

According to its constitution, the Society was organized April 24, 1915 with the following intent: "The objects of the Society are: A closer association among the writers of the Middle West, the stimulation of creative literary effort, and the establishment of a library of books and manuscripts by members of the organization."

The Society of Midland Authors is headquartered in Chicago. Many of its meetings are held at the Cliff Dwellers Club.

== Notable members ==
Founded in 1915, the Society elected as its first president Hobart Chatfield-Taylor. Charter members included Hamlin Garland, James Whitcomb Riley, William Allen White, Edna Ferber, Harriet Monroe, George Ade, Vachel Lindsay and Clarence Darrow. Other notable members over the years included Ring Lardner, Edgar Lee Masters, Loredo Taft, Gene Stratton Porter, Jane Addams, Daniel J. Boorstin, August Derleth and Carl Sandburg.

== Literary awards ==
Each year, the Society of Midland Authors gives literary awards in the categories of Adult Fiction, Adult Nonfiction, Biography, Children's Fiction, Children's Nonfiction, and Poetry. The James Friend Memorial Award for Literary and Dramatic Criticism is also given.
