= If We Were Villains =

2017 novel by M. L. Rio

- First edition
- Author: M. L. Rio
- Language: English
- Genre: Theatre-fiction
- Published: 2017
- Publisher: Flatiron Books
- Media type: Print
- ISBN: 9781785656477

If We Were Villains is the debut novel of American author M. L. Rio, first published in 2017 by Flatiron Books. The novel concerns a murder mystery surrounding Oliver Marks, a former actor at the fictional Dellecher Shakespeare conservatory and primarily takes place during his fourth and final year at the conservatory. A series adaptation of the novel is in development.

== Plot ==
The evening before he is due to be released on parole after serving a decade for an unspecified crime, Oliver Marks is approached by Detective Colborne, the lead investigator on his case. Suspicious of the official story, Colborne announces his retirement from the police force and asks Oliver to tell him the truth. Oliver accepts but requests that Colborne not act upon what Oliver will tell him.

In 1997, Oliver is in his fourth and final year at the prestigious Dellecher Classical Conservatory, where he resides with his six classmates in a small dormitory called the Castle. As underperforming students are purged every year, the seven of them are the only fourth-year acting students remaining. The night before auditions for Julius Caesar, one of the students—Alexander—suggests that the auditions are pointless as all seven have been consistently typecast — the hero (James), the villain (Alexander), the tyrant (Richard), the temptress (Meredith), the ingénue (Wren), and the unlucky two consigned to bit parts (Oliver and Filippa). When they receive the cast, Alexander's predictions are revealed to be correct.

However, the situation changes at the annual Halloween performance, a select few scenes from Macbeth fourth-year students traditionally perform each year. Each student is mailed an envelope containing their casting assignment and the scenes to prepare, as well as instructions not to share the information with any of their peers. Oliver is assigned the part of Banquo and is surprised to see James, rather than Richard, appear as Macbeth on Halloween night. After the show, the students throw a party during which a drunk and jealous Richard ends up attacking James, nearly drowning him in the lake where the play was staged. Richard reluctantly apologizes, and the group tries to brush off the assault.

In the coming weeks, Richard grows more violent and begins to attack his fellow students, including his girlfriend Meredith, James, and Oliver, onstage during Caesar. Oliver, Alexander, and James decide to fight back during Caesar's death scene, which quickly spirals out of control. At the cast party, Richard punches a student who had been flirting with Meredith. He proceeds to call Meredith a slut and gets into a physical argument with her as well. Afterward, Oliver seeks out Meredith to comfort her, and the two end up having sex.

The next morning, Oliver and Meredith are awoken by Filippa. She leads the group to the lake, where they find Richard with his skull broken. He is alive, but barely. James tries to help him but is stopped by Alexander, who suggests they should let him die and thus end his reign of terror. The group agrees to wait for Richard to die, then call the police and pretend he was already dead when they came upon him.

The students are briefly questioned by the police, led by Detective Colborne, and Richard's death is ruled a drunken accident. Oliver returns home for Thanksgiving and learns his parents will not be paying for his final semester, though the school agrees to let him work part-time as a custodian to alleviate his tuition expenses. After the students return from break, they prepare to perform scenes from Romeo and Juliet, another tradition, at the Christmas masquerade ball. During the performance, Oliver discovers that James is in love with Wren. He becomes jealous and realizes that he is romantically attracted to James.

After Oliver visits Meredith over winter break, they grow closer and begin dating and sleeping together more often. When Oliver returns to Dellecher, he cleans the Castle as part of his new custodial duties, overhearing a visit from Detective Colborne and his partner, during which Colborne admits that, despite the official ruling, he does not believe Richard's death to be an accident. Afterward, Oliver discovers a bloodstained piece of fabric in the fireplace and hides it among some discarded sets in the Fine Arts Building.

The fourth years are assigned King Lear as their spring production. However, as the semester progresses, the cast grows increasingly despondent due to Richard's death. Wren begins to suffer fainting spells, James breaks Oliver's nose during combat practice, and Alexander overdoses on drugs but survives. The night of the Lear cast party, James gets drunk and begins acting erratically, only speaking in character as Edmund. The following morning, as Oliver cleans their dorm room, he discovers a bloodstained boat hook hidden in James' mattress.

Oliver confronts James during the intermission of Lear, and James reluctantly confesses. As Richard stormed out of the Caesar cast party, he assaulted Wren, who was trying to calm him. Wren then begged James to go after Richard, fearing he would hurt himself. James searched for him by the lake, only to realize Richard had been following him the whole time. Richard began to taunt and threaten him, eventually making a homophobic remark in which he accused James and Oliver of being in love with one another and threatening to drown James in the lake. James then grabbed the nearest item — the boat hook — and hit him with it. James also admits that Filippa knew about the murder and that it was she who burned his bloody shirt in the fireplace.

Oliver and James return to Lear, only to see Colborne waiting in the wings. Realizing their time is up, James kisses Oliver onstage. Before Colborne can make an arrest, Oliver confesses to Richard's murder, using a slightly tweaked version of James' story. As his fingerprints are on both the shirt scrap and the boat hook, he is arrested and put on trial, though Colborne does not believe him to be the real killer.

On the day of Oliver's release from prison in 2008, Filippa, the only member of the group with whom he has maintained steady contact, comes to pick him up. Oliver is eager to reunite with James, who had eventually stopped visiting, but is informed that he drowned himself four years earlier. Instead, Oliver goes to visit Meredith, now a television actress living in Chicago. She admits that she was the one who told Colborne to arrest James at the performance, as he confessed to her one day after an intense rehearsal. Oliver admits that he was in love with James while they were together, but says that he also loved her. The two tentatively resume their relationship.

Filippa sends Oliver James' suicide note, which James had addressed to him. Oliver recognizes it as a monologue from Pericles, Prince of Tyre, in which Pericles laments the apparent death of his wife, Thaisa, in the middle of a storm at sea. Her body is cast into the ocean, but — unbeknownst to Pericles — washes up near the home of a physician who is able to revive her. For years, Thaisa lives hidden away from the rest of society as a priestess, believing her husband to have died in the storm until the goddess Diana helps them reunite. Upon researching James' death online, Oliver learns that James' body was never found.

== Characters ==
- Oliver Marks, the main character, believes himself to be the least talented member of the acting troupe, a middle child whose father is vehemently opposed to him becoming an actor. Plays The Loyal Sidekick.
- Richard Stirling, a talented actor who also hides an abusive dark side. He is a second-generation actor. Plays The Tyrant.
- James Farrow, Oliver's best friend and the son of a literature professor and his much younger student. Plays The Hero.
- Meredith Dardenne, an incredibly beautiful redhead who comes from a wealthy family of watch-makers; Richard's girlfriend. Plays The Temptress.
- Alexander Vass, a gay former foster-care student of half-Latino descent and drug addict. Plays The Villain.
- Wren Stirling, Richard's cousin, a second-generation actress. Plays The Ingénue.
- Filippa Kosta, the only actor in the troupe to remain close to Oliver after he goes to prison. She goes to work for the conservatory after graduation. Plays The Chameleon.
- Detective Joseph Colborne, The lead detective who put Oliver in prison.
- Frederick Teasdale, one of only two main teachers of the fourth-year acting students at Dellecher. A kind and older man who favors James as his favorite student.
- Gwendolyn Oswald, one of only two main teachers of the fourth-year acting students at Dellecher. A strict woman who favors Richard as her favorite student.
- Camilo Verela, the fight choreographer, personal trainer, and movement coach of the main characters. Described as a young Chilean man with a dark beard and a gold earring.

== Reception ==
The novel drew mixed reviews. The New York Times called it "at once good and bad." Kirkus Reviews called it a "melodramatic, suspenseful debut novel". Many readers including Cynthia d'Aprix Sweeney, the writer of The Nest, compared this novel to Donna Tartt's The Secret History.

== Television adaptation ==
In September 2022, it was announced that Sex Education producer Eleven Film was co-developing a series adaptation of If We Were Villains with Canadian production company Blink49 Studios.
