= The History Man =

1975 novel by Malcolm Bradbury

- First edition
- Author: Malcolm Bradbury
- Cover artist: Francisco Goya; Dog Buried in Sand
- Language: English
- Publisher: Secker & Warburg
- Publication date: 1975
- Publication place: United Kingdom
- Media type: Print & Audio
- Pages: 240
- ISBN: 0-436-06502-9

The History Man is a campus novel by Malcolm Bradbury published in 1975. His best-known novel, it is a satire of academic life in the "glass and steel" universities, the ones established in the 1960s which followed the "redbricks". In 1981 the book was made into a BBC television serial.

The New Zealander, Ian Carter, was so outraged by the book's portrait of sociology and sociologists that he was inspired to write Ancient Cultures of Conceit: British University Fiction in the Post War Years, a sociological examination of British academic novels.

== Plot introduction ==
Howard Kirk is a lecturer in sociology at the local university. He is a "theoretician of sociability". The Kirks are trendy lefties but living together for many years and the advance of middle age have left unfavourable traces in their relationship. It is Barbara Kirk who notices this change, whereas Howard is as enthusiastic and self-assured as always. Officially, the Kirks oppose traditional gender roles just as fiercely as the exploitation of humans by other humans. Practices have crept into their lives, which do not live up to such high standards, Howard writes books, while Barbara—stranded with much of the housework and two little children—would like to but never gets round to it. Any female student who comes to live with—rather than work for—them is made to babysit and perform domestic chores.

== Plot summary ==
When Howard and Barbara meet in their third year at the University of Leeds, Howard is a virgin. They are religious, working-class and during their student years cannot afford more than the bare necessities of life. A few years after their graduation, in the summer of 1963, the "old Kirks", already a married couple living in a small bedsit, metamorphose into the "new Kirks" when one day, while Howard is at the university where he works as a lecturer, Barbara has spontaneous, casual sex with an Egyptian student. This fling triggers a series of events. When he has got over the shock, Howard begins to associate with all kinds of radical people. The Kirks make many new friends. They smoke pot at parties, Barbara develops a new interest in health food and astrology, Howard grows a beard and they both start having "small affairs". When Barbara gets pregnant, rather than cancelling his class, Howard takes his students to the clinic to watch his wife giving birth. Finally, in 1967, he is appointed lecturer at Watermouth and right from the start he is intent on radicalising that bourgeois town, especially the new university, an institution that he describes as 'a place I can work against'.

The novel chronicles a term in the lives of Howard and Barbara. Howard's intolerance concerning non-Marxist, especially conservative, thinking makes him persecute one of the male participants of his seminar who wears a university blazer and a tie (which make him look like a student from the 1950s) and insists on being allowed to present his paper in the traditional, formal way, without being interrupted and without having to answer questions before he has finished his train of thought. In front of the others Howard calls him a "heavy, anal type" and what he has prepared for class "an anal, repressed paper", without considering his hypocrisy. Kirk succeeds in having the student, a "historical irrelevance", expelled from the university.

Whereas Howard selects his many sexual partners from among the people who work at the university (students as well as faculty members) on Saturday mornings, Barbara Kirk regularly goes on "shopping trips" to London to visit the same young man. The Kirks consider the parties they throw in their house a success if at least some of their guests have sex in the many rooms they provide for it. At one point in the novel, Howard's promiscuity gets him into trouble when he is told that he might be sacked for "gross moral turpitude" (which he defines to a female student of his as "raping large numbers of nuns") but he shrugs off this accusation as being based on "a very vague concept, especially these days".

A number of supporting characters round off the vivid picture of the permissive society of the early 1970s. There is Henry Beamish, one of Howard's colleagues whose childless middle-class marriage to Myra has been largely unhappy. There is Dr. Macintosh, a sociologist from Howard's department who, despite his pregnant wife, can be convinced by Howard that having sex with one of his students during the end-of-term party is the right thing to do. Flora Beniform is a social psychologist with rather unconventional research methods: she sleeps with men in whom she is professionally interested to elicit information.

At the end of the novel Howard and Barbara are still together and all their friends admire their stable yet "advanced" marriage. Howard has even further metamorphosed into "the radical hero" who is "generating the onward march of mind, the onward process of history". According to his philosophy, things, especially those he likes, are bound to happen: this is called "historical inevitability". The trajectory of the Kirks' life together ends when Barbara attempts suicide during a party.

== Critical discussion ==
- Ian Carter Ancient Cultures of Conceit: British University Fiction in the Post War Years Routledge and Kegan Paul (1990)
- Lodge, David (1992) "Staying on the Surface", pp. 117–120 in his The Art of Fiction (Penguin).
- In his collection of short literary commentaries, Where was Rebecca Shot? by John Sutherland

== TV adaptation ==
A four-part adaptation of The History Man was broadcast by the BBC in 1981. Antony Sher played Howard Kirk and Geraldine James his wife Barbara; Isla Blair played Flora Beniform. Exteriors for the series were shot at the University of Lancaster and in Bristol. At the end, there is a caption stating that in the 1979 general election Howard Kirk voted Conservative.

== See also ==
- David Lodge's novels, in particular The British Museum Is Falling Down and How Far Can You Go?
- David Mamet's play Oleanna, where roles are reversed.
- Philip Larkin's poem "Annus Mirabilis" (Year of Wonder)
