= Brockley =

District and electoral ward of London, England

Coordinates: 51.4529°N 0.0345°W

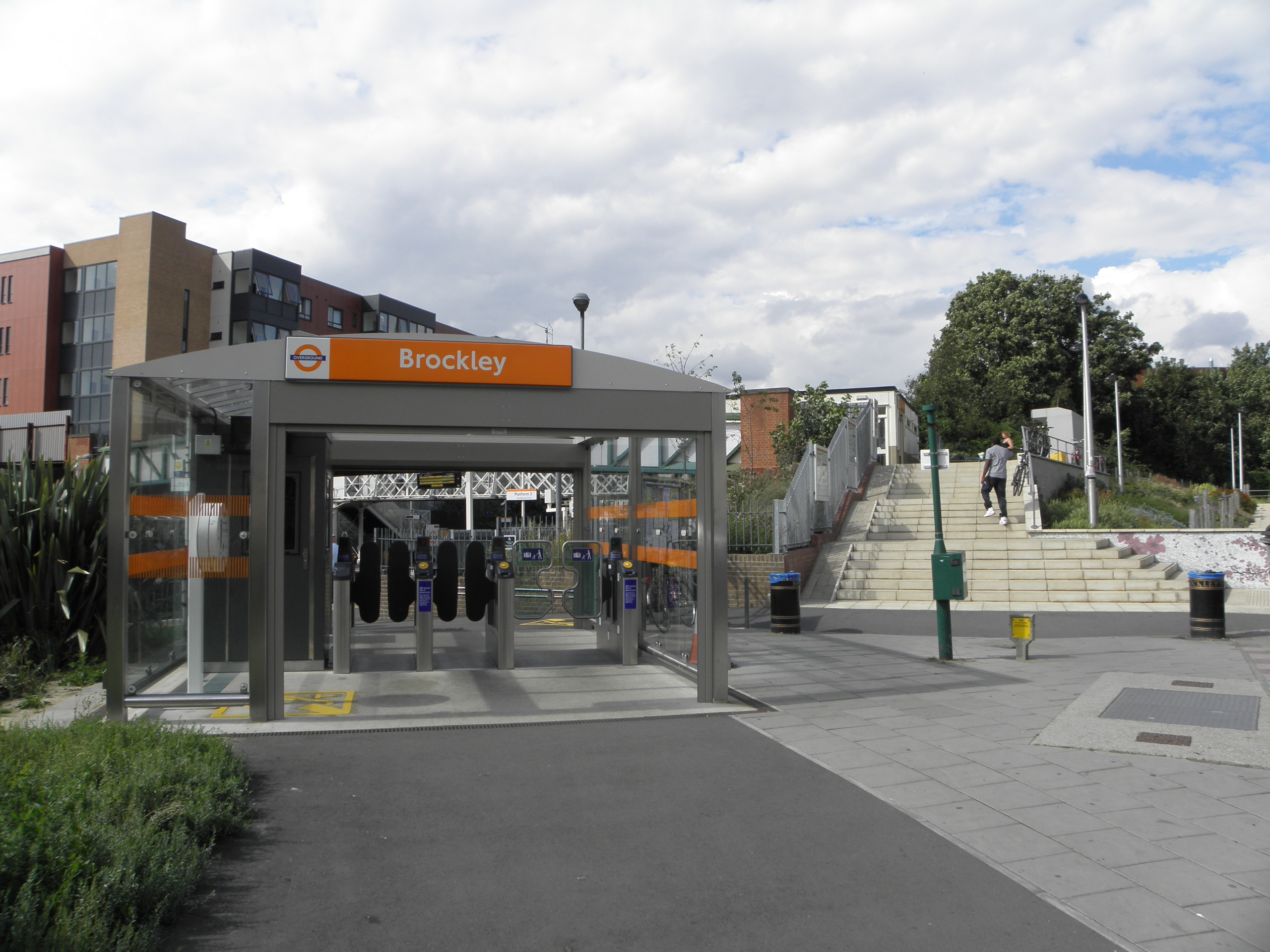
- Brockley railway station

- Location within Greater London
- Population: 17,156 (2011 Census. Ward)
- OS grid reference: TQ365745
- London borough: Lewisham
- Ceremonial county: Greater London
- Region: London
- Country: England
- Sovereign state: United Kingdom
- Post town: LONDON
- Postcode district: SE4
- Dialling code: 020
- Police: Metropolitan
- Fire: London
- Ambulance: London
- UK Parliament: Lewisham North
- London Assembly: Greenwich and Lewisham

Brockley is a district and an electoral ward of south London, England, in the London Borough of Lewisham 5 miles (8 km) south-east of Charing Cross. In 2021 it was named the best area of London to live in. It is an area rich in Victorian and Edwardian domestic architecture, historic trees and original lanes and mews. This is protected by a conservation area and the Brockley Society. It has a strong community and numerous popular cafes and restaurants. The station is on both the mainline railway and the Windrush line. The London Borough of Lewisham's Draft Local Implementation Plan 2019–41 proposes linking the station to the Victoria to Dartford line which crosses Brockley station by 2030.

== History ==
A map showing the Brockley ward of Lewisham Metropolitan Borough as it appeared in 1916

The name Brockley is derived from "Broca's woodland clearing", a wood where badgers are seen (broc is the Old English for badger) or Brook (Stream) by a wood (Ley). In the late 12th century, a small Premonstratensian house was founded there, before being transferred to Bayham (Sussex) in 1208.

Formerly part of the county of Kent, Brockley fell into both the Metropolitan Borough of Lewisham and the Metropolitan Borough of Deptford in the County of London from 1900. The division was roughly around Hilly Fields, with the area to the north falling within Deptford. Brockley was subsequently reunified with the creation of Greater London in 1965 under the London Borough of Lewisham, which incorporated the Metropolitan Borough of Deptford.

Brockley has its origins in a small agricultural hamlet of the same name located in the area of the "Brockley Jack" (rebuilt 1895), a large public house that today houses the Brockley Jack Theatre. Brockley Hall (demolished 1931) stood nearby and now gives its name to a road on a 1930s housing estate. Crofton Park railway station was built nearby in 1892 by the London, Chatham and Dover Railway.

Brockley railway station opened on 6 March 1871 and is currently served by London Overground's Windrush line and Southern in London fare zone 2. As is often the case in London, the location of the station defines the geography of the district and areas to the north and west of Brockley Station, previously considered as Hatcham, New Cross, Telegraph Hill (SE14) and St Johns (SE8), are now considered Brockley. Ordnance Survey maps of Brockley up to the 1940s tend to centre on the location of the Jack, the Hall, and Crofton Park railway station, but recent maps are now more centred on Brockley Station and nearby areas, such as with the electoral ward map demarcating Brockley. While the name Crofton Park was invented by the railway company, it was given official sanction with the naming of Crofton Park Library, a fine arts and crafts building, in 1905, and is now the name of an electoral ward to the south.

The oldest surviving house in the area of what is now considered to be the northern extent of Brockley is the "Stone House" on Lewisham Way (opposite LeSoCo) built in 1773 by the architect George Gibson the Younger. which is a Grade II* Listed building and was historically considered to be in Deptford.

Brockley market gardens were famous for their enormous Victoria rhubarb which were fertilised by 'night soil' from London. There were orchards too and some ancient fruit trees survive in local gardens. Until the late 19th century a small river flowed northward from Crofton Park and east of Malpas Rd to join the River Thames via Deptford Creek. It is now covered over.

Industrial development arrived in 1809 in the form of the Croydon Canal running from Croydon to Bermondsey. This was later filled in and replaced by the London & Croydon railway which runs through the original canal cutting between Brockley (opened in 1871) and New Cross Gate stations. Some of the oldest houses in Brockley are the cottages and shops which form a small terrace on Coulgate Street, just east of Brockley station. These are believed to date from 1833 and were probably originally associated with the canal. From 1872 until 1917, Brockley Lane railway station provided access to the Greenwich Park branch line and the remains of the old station entrance are still visible at Brockley Cross.

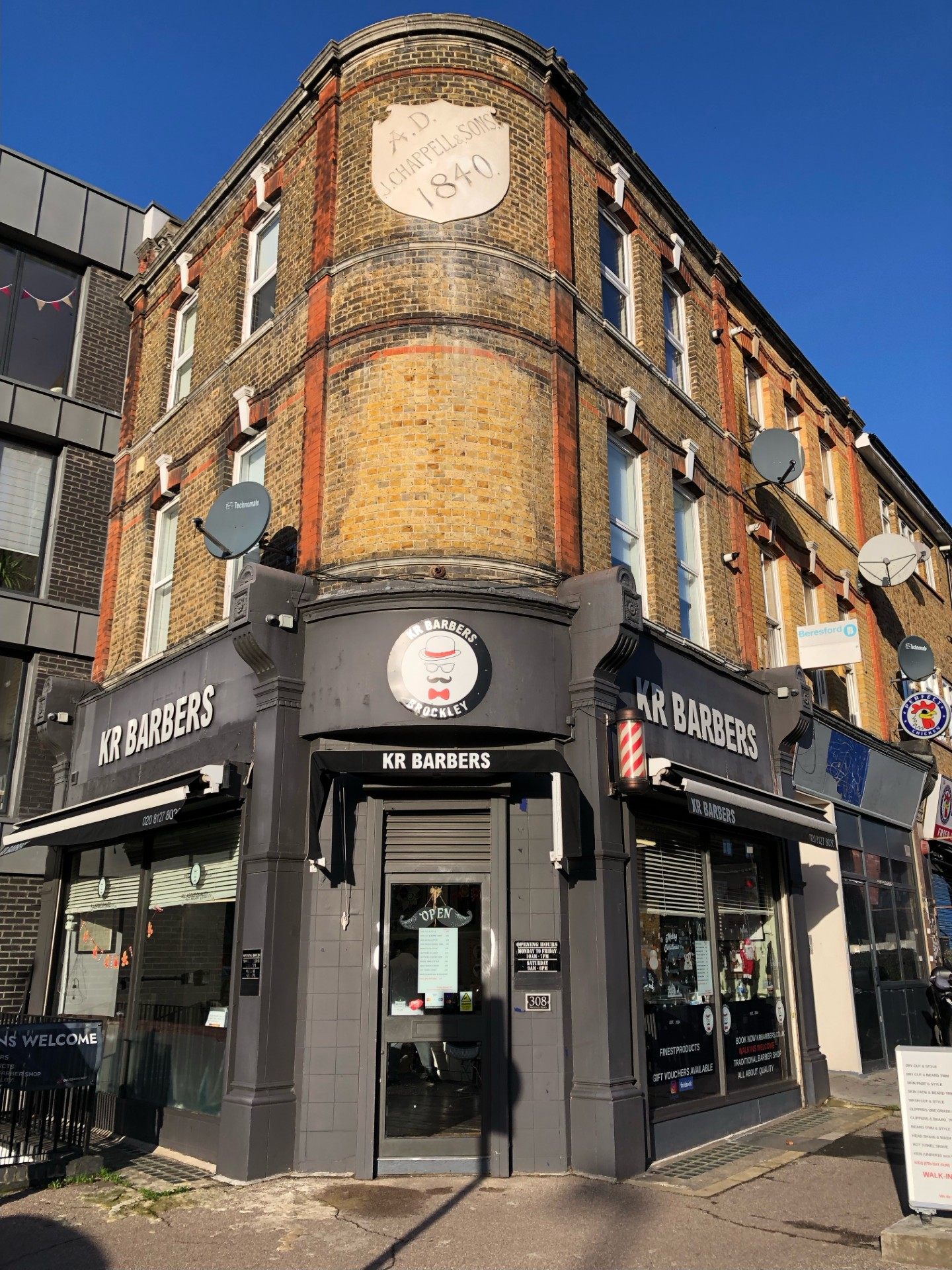
308 Brockley Road with 1840 datestone as seen in 2025

In the latter half of the nineteenth century, the Tyrwhitt-Drake family developed the north side of Brockley with grand villas, large terraces and semi-detached houses (Tyrwhitt Road and Drake Road are named after the family). Development started south of Lewisham Way in the late 1840s with the modest cottages at 2–22 Upper Brockley Rd and spread south and east towards Hilly Fields. In 1900 Chalsey Rd was the last road to be completed within the current conservation area. However, open farmland remained south of Brockley Grove and west of the railway line into the early 1930s.

Many grand houses in Brockley were occupied by the owners and managers of factories in neighbouring industrial areas such as Deptford and Bermondsey. At 63 Breakspears Road lived Edwin Watts, owner of 'ER Watts and Son', a mathematical instrument making company in Camberwell Road. Charles Booth's Map of London Poverty (1900) describes the residents of Wickham Road and Breakspears Road as "well-to-do" or "wealthy". The actress Lillie Langtry was one notable resident during this period. The terraced streets west of Brockley Rd were more mixed: "comfortable and poor". The artist/poet David Jones, whose father was a printer, grew up in Howson Road. Some of David Jones's paintings and illustrations depict his parents' house and garden. The writer Henry Williamson, the son of a bank clerk, was born in nearby Braxfield Road.

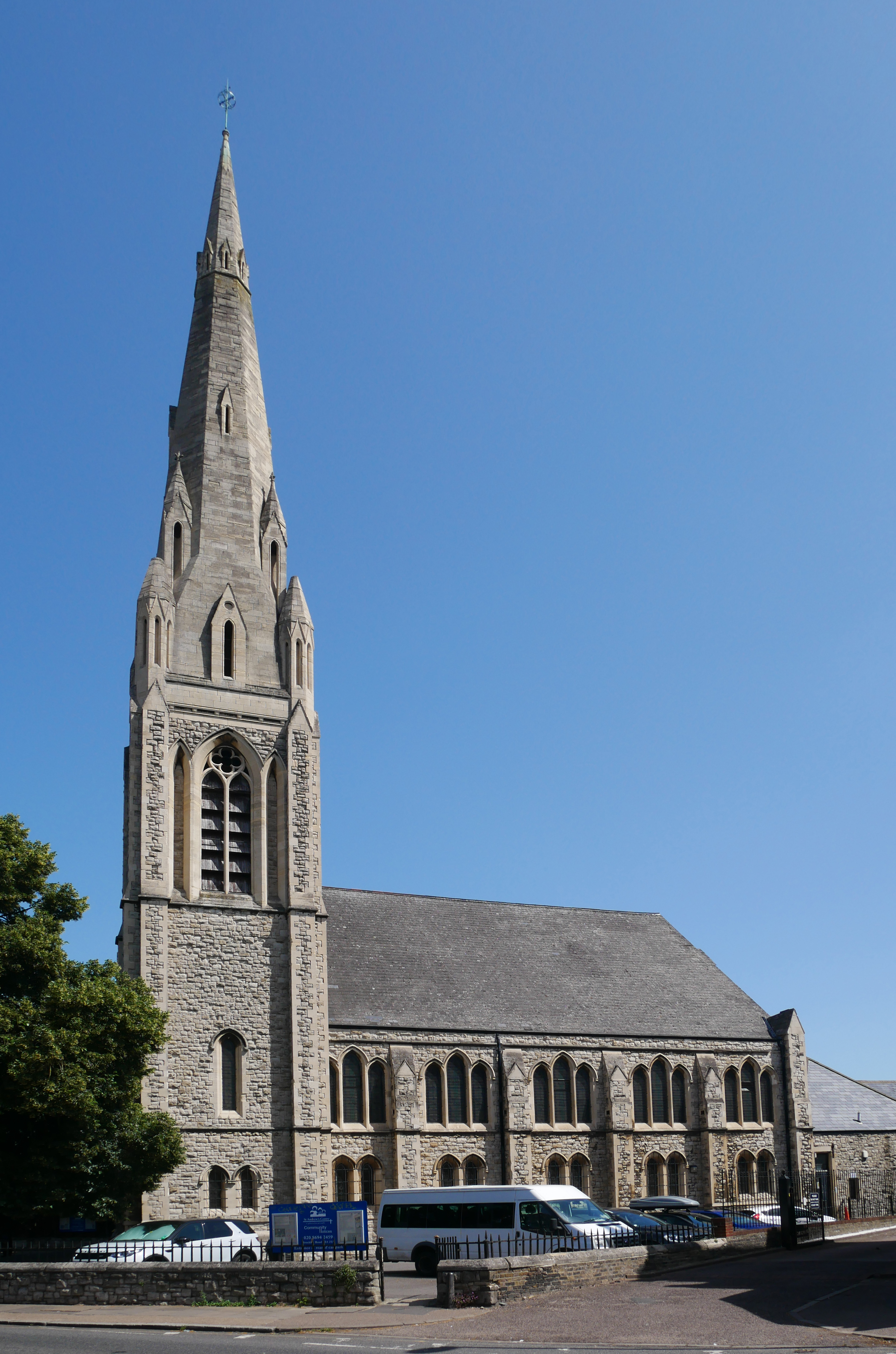
The Church of Saint Andrew in Brockley, built in 1882 and now Grade II listed

Brockley contains several fine churches: St. Mary Magdalen's RC Church on Howson Road (completed in 1901), St. Peters on Wickham Road (completed 1870), the Grade II listed St Andrews, Brockley Rd (1882) – originally a Presbyterian Church, which contains the modern stained glass New Cross Fire memorial window (2002) – and the Grade II listed St Hilda's, Crofton Park 1908. The latter was designed by J E Newberry in the Arts and Crafts movement style and still contains its original interior. A Methodist Church stood on Harefield Road (Now demolished).

After World War I, Brockley began to lose its exclusivity as the wealthy began to relocate to the outer suburbs and the big houses were increasingly sub-divided into multiple occupation. The typical inter-war houses on Upper Brockley Gardens and on Harefield Rd are clearly more modest than their Victorian neighbours and in the case of Harefield Road, were built on a large house's garden. Small industrial workshops also became established in the mews behind the large houses.

The Grade II listed Rivoli Ballroom (originally a cinema) dates from 1913 but was remodelled as a dance hall in 1951. It has a unique and outstanding interior, which has featured in many films, videos and fashion shoots. In 2007 The White Stripes rock band played a secret gig here. Other notable live performances include those by Florence + the Machine (2009, 2012) and Damon Albarn (2014). The building has recently been listed (2007) and is now protected from demolition.

Being under the bomber flight path to the London docks, the area suffered significant V-2 rocket and other bomb damage in World War II. The post-war blocks of council flats at the south end of Wickham Rd and at the west end of Adelaide Avenue are evidence of this. During the Second World War, an anti-aircraft gun emplacement was located on Hilly Fields.

=== Post World War II ===
After the Second World War, most of the big houses were sub-divided into multiple occupation and the Council would give grants to convert houses into flats. In the period 1945–60s it was very difficult to get a bank loan to purchase a pre-1914-built property, hence the frequent subdivision of the larger older houses during this period.

In the 1950s and 1960s these houses provided accommodation for the recently arrived African-Caribbean population, many of whom found employment in nearby Deptford. In 1948, five passengers bound for England from Jamaica on the ship Empire Windrush gave Wickham Road as their intended destination on arrival in London. Other migrants came from Turkey, Cyprus, Italy and South Asia (especially Sri Lanka).

Some larger houses were demolished and blocks of flats built or houses built on their gardens.

From the mid-1960s artists (some associated with nearby Goldsmiths College) started to move into the large and at the time neglected houses on Manor Avenue, beginning the process of 'gentrification' which continues today.

Much of north Brockley was designated a Conservation Area in 1974 and in the same year the Brockley Society was formed with the aim of preserving and protecting the character of the area. This ensure that Brockley remained one of the best preserved and most coherent Victorian suburbs in Inner London containing examples of almost every style of mid- to late 19th century-domestic architecture from imposing Gothic Revival buildings to modest workmen's cottages. There are also mews behind some of the streets such as Ashby Mews and Wickham Mews. This range of 19th-century architectural styles makes Brockley unusual.

=== 21st Century ===
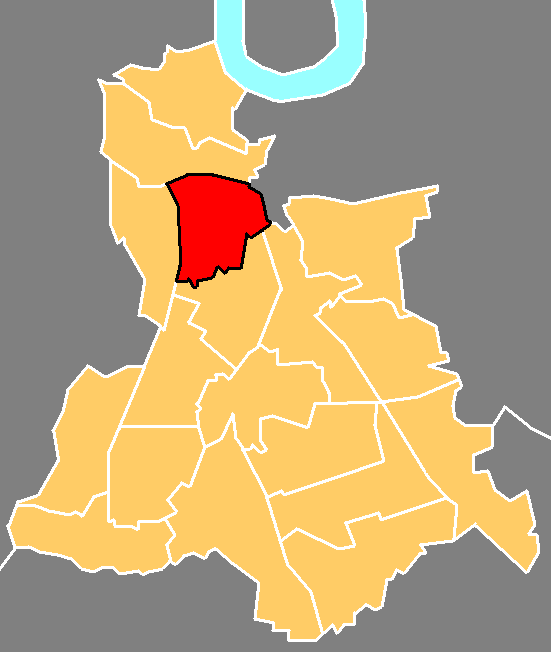
The electoral ward of Brockley (red) within the London Borough of Lewisham (orange)

In 2000 the Brockley Cross Action Group was set up with the aim of influencing the regeneration of the Brockley Cross area and has been instrumental in the restoration of Brockley Common and the greening of several other derelict sites.

The extension of the East London Line, now part of the London Overground network, opened in May 2010. It connects Brockley with north London and encouraged new residential development around Brockley station.

A number of empty sites were redeveloped into flats and Coulgate Street was pedestrianised - increasingly it became a focal point for Brockley as a place to gather away from the main road.

== Green space ==
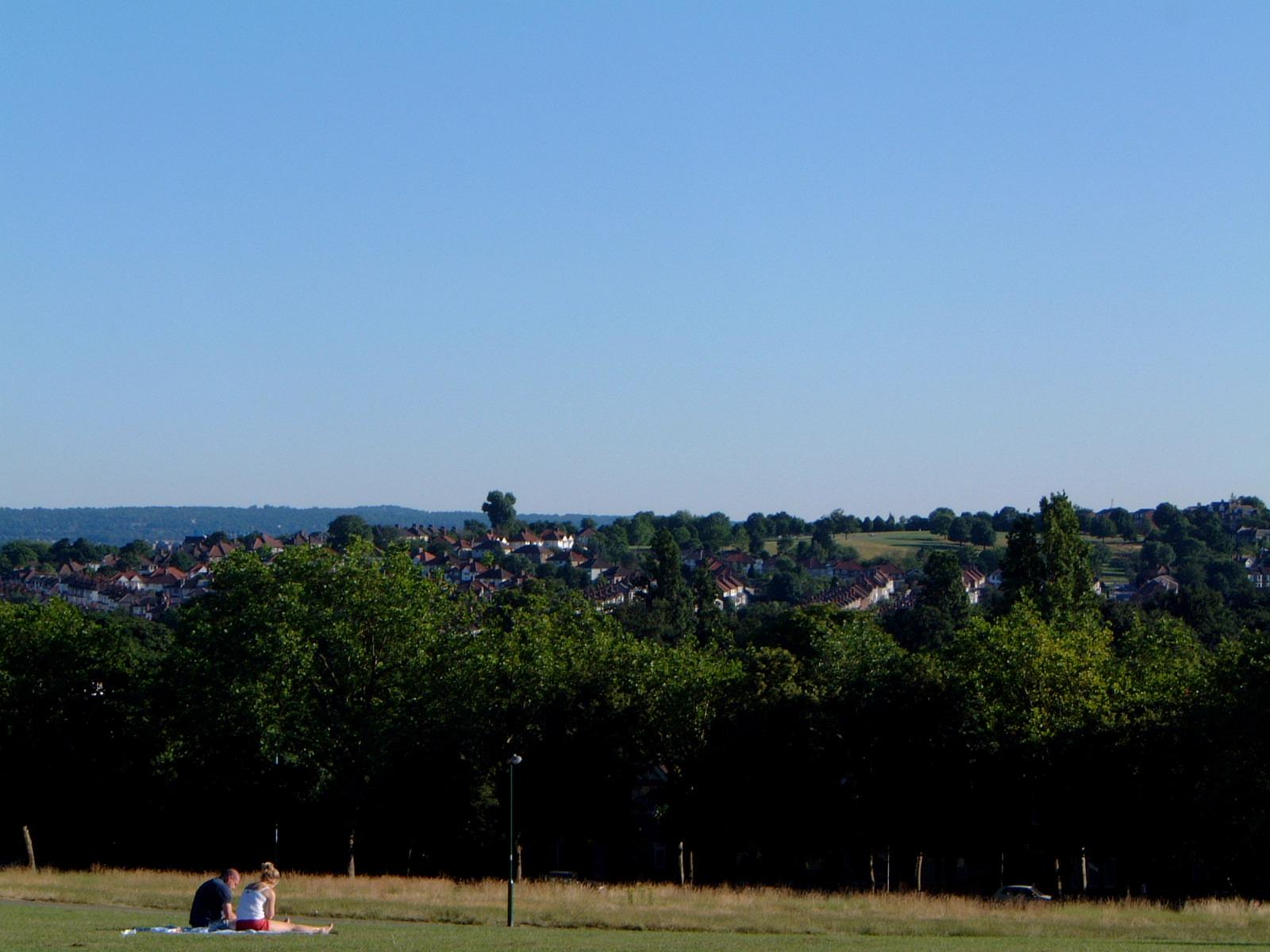
Blythe Hill from Hilly Fields

Brockley contains several attractive open spaces, amongst them Blythe Hill, Brockley and Ladywell Cemeteries (opened in 1858 and now a nature reserve) and Hilly Fields. The latter was saved from development by the Commons Preservation Society and local groups in the 1880s and 1890s (including Octavia Hill, one of the founders of the National Trust). In 1896, after being bought with the proceeds of private donations and funding from the London County Council, the fields were transformed from old brickpits and ditches into a park. The park became a regular meeting place for the Suffragette movement between 1907 and 1914.

The old West Kent Grammar School (later renamed Brockley County Grammar School), now Prendergast Hilly Fields College, a Grade II* listed building, is situated at the top of the hill. The School hall contains the 'Brockley murals'. Dating from 1932 to 1935 by Charles Mahoney, Evelyn Dunbar and other students of the Royal College of Art, they are considered some of the best examples in the country of the Neo-Romantic style and illustrate many local scenes.

Close by, a stone circle was erected in 2000 as a millennium project by a group of local artists, which won a Civic Trust Award in 2002. The Hilly Fields Midsummer Fayre has been running for over 30 years and is a much celebrated annual community event. At 160 ft above sea level, Hilly Fields has wide views from Canary Wharf and Shooters Hill to Crystal Palace and the North Downs in Kent.

West of the railway between Brockley and New Cross Gate railway stations lies the Brockley Nature Reserve (formerly known as New Cross Gate Cutting Nature Reserve). This ten acre woodland is home to over 30 species of birds including greater spotted woodpecker and sparrowhawk. The reserve is managed by London Wildlife Trust, access (when open) is from the entrance on Vesta Road. Gorne Wood is a three acre piece of ancient woodland, the closest such piece of land to the City of London.

== The arts in Brockley ==
Like its neighbour Telegraph Hill, Brockley has a reputation as a focus for the arts in South London. The mid-1960s saw the beginning of a 'bohemian' influx of artists, musicians and alternative types attracted by the neglected and (at the time very cheap) Victorian houses and large rambling gardens and the close proximity to Goldsmiths College and Camberwell School of Art. Many artists have built studios in their back gardens and the annual 'open studios' weekend is a good opportunity to visit some of these.

The Lewisham Art House, housed in a grand Edwardian building (which was formerly Deptford Library) on Lewisham Way, provides art classes, studio and exhibition space. The Grade II listed library building is a Carnegie Library, made possible by the philanthropy of the industrialist Andrew Carnegie. It opened in 1914 and was designed by Sir Alfred Brumwell Thomas. The Brockley Jack Theatre has recently been refurbished and has a high reputation for performances of new plays and is the home of the Brockley Jack Film Club. Each summer local artists host a thriving Brockley Open Studios weekend. Since 2004 Brockley has also hosted the Brockley Max performing arts festival involving many local musicians and singers. In 2015, the neighbourhood hosted the first annual Brockley Street Art Festival, which saw the creation of more than twenty high quality murals in the area.

== Politics ==
Brockley ward is represented by three Labour councillors as of the 2022 election.

From 2006 to 2010, all of Brockley Ward's three councillors were from the Green Party and combined with neighbouring Ladywell ward, Lewisham Council had six Green Party councillors; one of the highest number of Green party councillors in the UK. However, in the 2010 Local Elections, held at the same time as the General Election, the Green party lost all but one of their seats. The remaining seat was held by Darren Johnson in Brockley. In the 2014 Council elections the Green Party retained one of Brockley's council seats, which was held by Councillor John Coughlin.

== Notable residents ==
- Athlete (formed 1999), band consisting of lead singer Joel Pott, keyboard player Tim Wanstall and bassist Carey Willetts, who live in Brockley; used to rehearse at the Bear Cafe in Deptford High Street
- Rosie Barnes OBE, MP for Greenwich (1987–1992), Chief Executive of the Cystic Fibrosis Trust (1996–2010), Patron of Child Health International (2011– ), lived on Tressillian Road 1998–2017
- Steve Bolton, guitarist with Atomic Rooster, Paul Young and The Who; lived on Geoffrey Road in the 1980s
- Alan Brownjohn, poet and novelist, attended Brockley County School
- Kate Bush, singer, lived on Wickham Road in the early 1980s
- John Cale, musician with the Velvet Underground; a student at Goldsmiths College; lived on Wickham Road in the student halls of residence
- Hughroy Currie (Boxer), British Heavyweight Champion in 1985-86. Lived in Catford, Brockley and briefly Bromley
- Emily Davison, suffragette, born in Blackheath 1872, died at The Derby in 1913 after stepping in front of the King's horse; lived for a time in Brockley
- Alfred Drury, sculptor, lived in Tressillian Road and taught at Goldsmiths College
- Paul Drury, artist, born in Tressillian Road in 1903; taught at Goldsmiths College of Art
- Kerry Ellis, singer and West End stage actress, lives in Brockley
- Gabrielle, singer, lived in Brockley
- John Galliano, fashion designer, grew up in Brockley and visits with his design team
- Alberto Esteban Ignacio "G" Gispert, founder of the Hash House Harriers
- David Haig, actor and writer, resides in Brockley
- Matt Hales, singer, songwriter of Aqualung
- Bernard Hill, actor, lived in Wickam Gardens in the 1980s
- Darren Johnson, Green Party politician
- David Jones, modernist poet and artist; born in Brockley in 1895 and often stayed at his parents' house in Howson Road until his mother's death in 1936; attended Camberwell School of Art in 1909; his parents are buried in Brockley and Ladywell Cemetery where there is also a memorial to him.
- The June Brides, proto UK indie pop group including singer Phil Wilson; shared a house in Chudleigh Road; viola player Frank Sweeney still lives not far from there.
- Brian Keaney, children's author, lives in Brockley
- Lily Langtry, actress and mistress of King Edward VII of the United Kingdom; lived at 42 Wickham Road
- Marie Lloyd, music hall singer; lived at 196 Wickham Terrace in 1891–2
- David Lodge, his family home was at 81 Millmark Grove, Brockley; he writes about the neighbourhood, focusing on the rundown local cinema (now demolished) in his first novel The Picturegoers (1960) and inTherapy
- Mary Millar, British actress best known for her role as Rose on Keeping up Appearances
- Spike Milligan (1918–2002), comedian; lived at 50 Riseldine Road (on the cusp of Crofton Park and Honor Oak) after coming to England from India in the 1930s
- Brian Molko, musician, lived in Brockley for a number of years while forming the band Placebo
- Nick Nicely, musician; his 1982 cult psychedelic classic "Hilly Fields" was inspired by the park of the same name
- Pagan Altar, metal band who recorded a song entitled "The Devil Came Down to Brockley"
- Mica Paris, singer
- Novelist, English Grime MC, producer, and rapper; was nominated for MOBO Awards in 2014
- Charles Stewart Parnell (1846–1891), Irish Nationalist politician; lived with Katharine O'Shea at 112 Tressillian Road
- Ed Petrie, TV presenter and stand-up comedian
- Sybil Phoenix, former Mayoress of Lewisham; first black woman to receive the M.B.E., to become a Freeman of the City of London and Freeman of the Borough of Lewisham; local resident
- Harry Price, psychic and paranormal researcher, famed for his work on the Borley Rectory hauntings; lodged at 22 Harefield Road; went to school at Waller Road and Haberdashers' Aske's Hatcham College
- Philip Quast, Australian actor, lived in Brockley for over a decade
- John Alan Quinton, flight lieutenant in the RAF; awarded a posthumous George Cross; born in Brockley
- David Rocastle, professional footballer, playing midfield for Arsenal and England
- John Stainer (1840–1901), composer and organist at St Paul's Cathedral; possibly lived in Wickham Road, Brockley and is said to have played the organ in St Peter's Church; a local primary school is named after him
- Montague Summers, eccentric writer, taught at Brockley County School
- Chris Tarrant, TV presenter; taught at a school in Brockley in the late 1960s/early '70s; for some time lived in his car near the school
- Kae Tempest, poet, performance artist, recording artist, and playwright
- Paul Theroux, his 1976 novel The Family Arsenal is set in Cliff Terrace off St Johns Vale
- Bobby Valentino, singer, songwriter, musician and actor; has lived in Brockley for the past 30 years; best known as the co-writer and violinist of the Bluebells hit single "Young at Heart"
- Edgar Wallace, author and original screenwriter of King Kong; lived at 6 Tresillian Crescent, Brockley, 1900–1932; his fictional detective character J G Reeder lived in Brockley Road; his book The Duke in the Suburbs is also based in Brockley
- Baron Warner, Norman Warner, Baron Warner of Brockley PC, politician; grew up on Drakefell Road
- Sir Willard White (C.B.E.), opera singer; born in Jamaica in 1946; once lived in Wickham Gardens and later Montague Avenue, Brockley
- Henry Williamson, writer and author of Tarka the Otter; born in 1895 at 66 Braxfield Road and lived at 21 Eastern Road, Brockley, during his childhood in the late 19th and early 20th century; describes turn-of-the-century Brockley in great detail in his semi-autobiographical novels, The Dark Lantern and Donkey Boy
- Denny Wright, jazz guitarist; grew up in Brockley before the second world war and served with the Auxiliary Fire Service there
- Ian Wright, professional footballer, playing striker for Arsenal and England; latterly sports pundit and TV presenter
- Bradley Wright-Phillips, professional footballer for Charlton Athletic F.C.
- Shaun Wright-Phillips, footballer; grew up in Brockley and attended Haberdashers' Aske's Hatcham College.

== Nearest places ==
- Crofton Park
- Catford
- Deptford
- Forest Hill
- Greenwich
- Honor Oak
- Ladywell
- Lewisham
- New Cross
- Nunhead
- Peckham
- Telegraph Hill, Lewisham

== Nearest railway stations ==
- Brockley railway station
- Crofton Park railway station
- Ladywell railway station
- Nunhead railway station
- St Johns railway station
- Forest Hill railway station
- Brockley Lane railway station (closed in 1917)

A proposal to create a new Brockley Interchange, linking the existing station to the Nunhead to Lewisham line with new platforms at the former Brockley Lane station, is included in the London Borough of Lewisham's 2019–2041 transport strategy. The document gives an approximate date of 2030 and states that funding from TfL and Network Rail would be needed for the project. The document states that TFL is to provide an estimated cost.

== In popular culture ==
Linton Kwesi Johnson mentions Brockley in his poem "Inglan Is A Bitch" (1980). He spells it "Brackly" as this is roughly how it sounds in Jamaican patois:

"dem a have a lickle facktri up inna Brackly"
"inna disya facktri all dem dhu is pack crackry"
"fi di laas fifteen years dem get mi laybah"
"now awftah fifteen years mi fall out a fayvah"

The musician Nick Nicely's 1982 cult psychedelic track "Hilly Fields" was inspired by the park of the same name.

Two early novels by Henry Williamson (who lived on Eastern Road) describe Brockley in great detail, as it was in the late 1800s and early 1900s.

Edgar Wallace's fictional 1920s detective J. G. Reeder lived in Brockley Road. Wallace himself lived in Tressillian Crescent, Brockley, for over 30 years. His book The Duke in the Suburbs is also based in Brockley.

The Picturegoers, the first novel by David Lodge, is set in and around a rundown cinema in 1950s Brockley; thinly disguised as 'Brickley'.

Blake Morrison's novel South of the River (2007) is set in Brockley.

Colin Wilson's book The Outsider (1956) opens with a reference to Brockley.

In 2003, the BBC1 documentary Worlds Apart showed two contrasting Brockley families living within yards of each other; one in a small council flat, the other in a large house.

The Rivoli Ballroom has featured in numerous films, TV shows and fashion shoots, and was used for the debut album launch for Florence and the Machine, the video for Tina Turner's Private Dancer and a secret gig by The White Stripes.

The Metros' song "Last of the Lookers" from their 2008 album More Money Less Grief mentions meeting a girl who is later found out not to be from their native Brockley.

Laura Wilson, the series' narrator and protagonist of ongoing comic book series The Wicked and the Divine lives in Brockley at the start of the series.
