= John 18:38 =

Verse of the Bible

- ← chapter 18 chapter 19 →
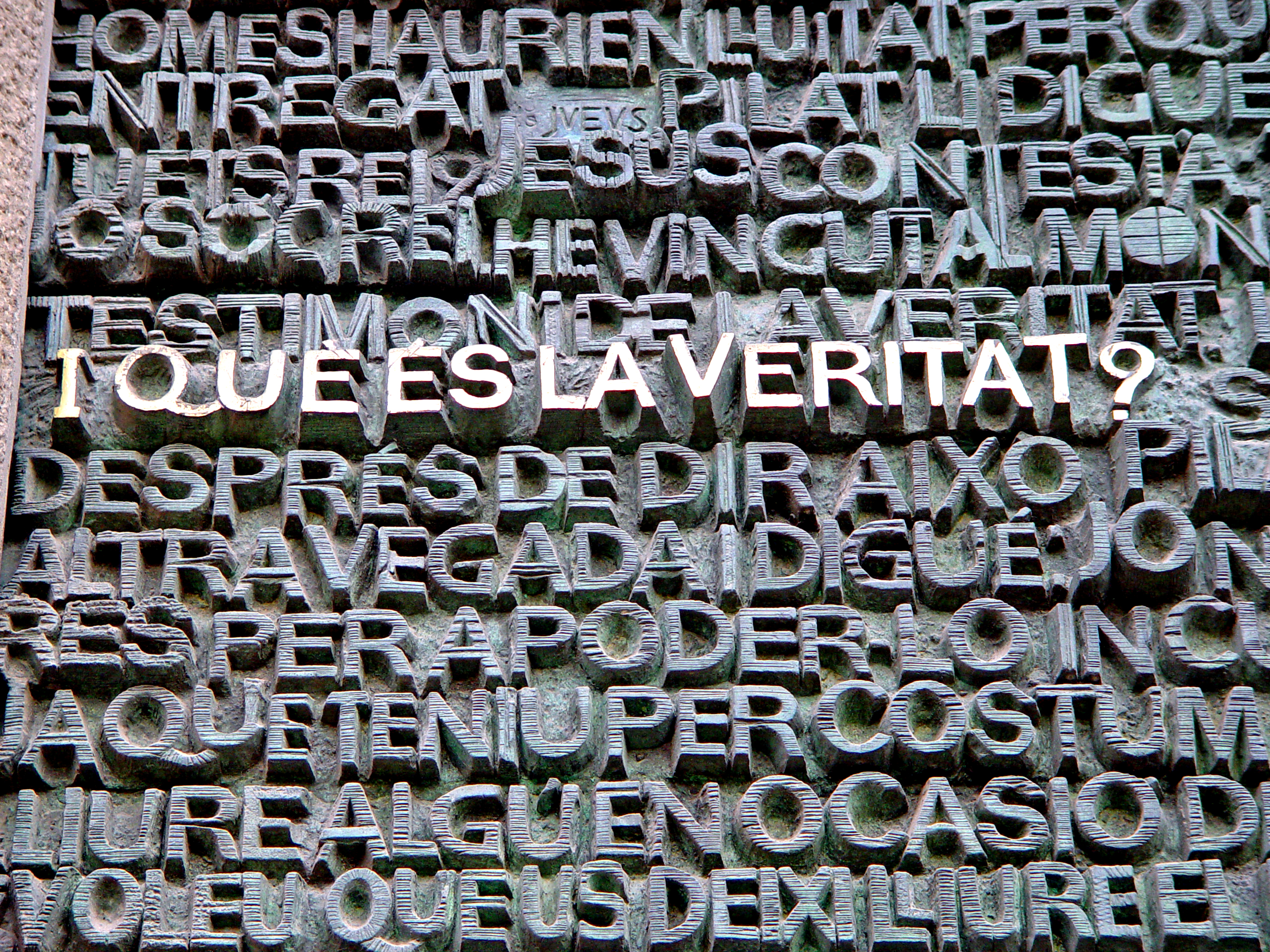
- "What is Truth?" - stylized inscription in Catalan at entrance to Sagrada Família Basilica, Barcelona.
- Book: Gospel of John
- Christian Bible part: New Testament

John 18:38 is the 38th verse in chapter 18 of the Gospel of John in the New Testament of Christian Bible. It is often referred to as "jesting Pilate". In it, Pontius Pilate questions Jesus' claim that he is "witness to the truth" (John 18:37).

Following this statement, Pilate tells Jewish authorities outside that he does not consider Jesus guilty of any crime.

== Text ==
SBLGNT (2010)	Nova Vulgata (1979)	KJV (1611)	NIV (2011)
^{37} εἶπεν οὖν αὐτῷ ὁ Πιλᾶτος· Οὐκοῦν βασιλεὺς εἶ σύ; ἀπεκρίθη ὁ Ἰησοῦς· Σὺ λέγεις ὅτι βασιλεύς εἰμι. ἐγὼ εἰς τοῦτο γεγέννημαι καὶ εἰς τοῦτο ἐλήλυθα εἰς τὸν κόσμον ἵνα μαρτυρήσω τῇ ἀληθείᾳ· πᾶς ὁ ὢν ἐκ τῆς ἀληθείας ἀκούει μου τῆς φωνῆς.	^{37} Dixit itaque ei Pilatus: “ Ergo rex es tu? ”. Respondit Iesus: “ Tu dicis quia rex sum. Ego in hoc natus sum et ad hoc veni in mundum, ut testimonium perhibeam veritati; omnis, qui est ex veritate, audit meam vocem ”.	^{37} Pilate therefore said unto him, Art thou a king then? Jesus answered, Thou sayest that I am a king. To this end was I born, and for this cause came I into the world, that I should bear witness unto the truth. Every one that is of the truth heareth my voice.	^{37} “You are a king, then!” said Pilate. Jesus answered, “You say that I am a king. In fact, the reason I was born and came into the world is to testify to the truth. Everyone on the side of truth listens to me.”
^{38} λέγει αὐτῷ ὁ Πιλᾶτος· Τί ἐστιν ἀλήθεια; Καὶ τοῦτο εἰπὼν πάλιν ἐξῆλθεν πρὸς τοὺς Ἰουδαίους, καὶ λέγει αὐτοῖς· Ἐγὼ οὐδεμίαν εὑρίσκω ἐν αὐτῷ αἰτίαν·	^{38} Dicit ei Pilatus: “ Quid est veritas? ”. Et cum hoc dixisset, iterum exivit ad Iudaeos et dicit eis: “ Ego nullam invenio in eo causam. ”	^{38} Pilate saith unto him, What is truth? And when he had said this, he went out again unto the Jews, and saith unto them, I find in him no fault at all.	^{38} “What is truth?” retorted Pilate. With this he went out again to the Jews gathered there and said, “I find no basis for a charge against him.”

== Analysis ==
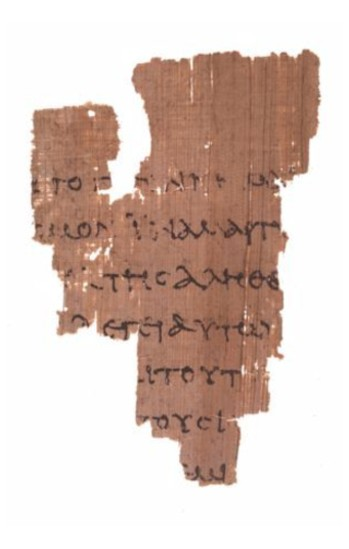
P52, an ancient papyrus inscribed with John 18:37–38

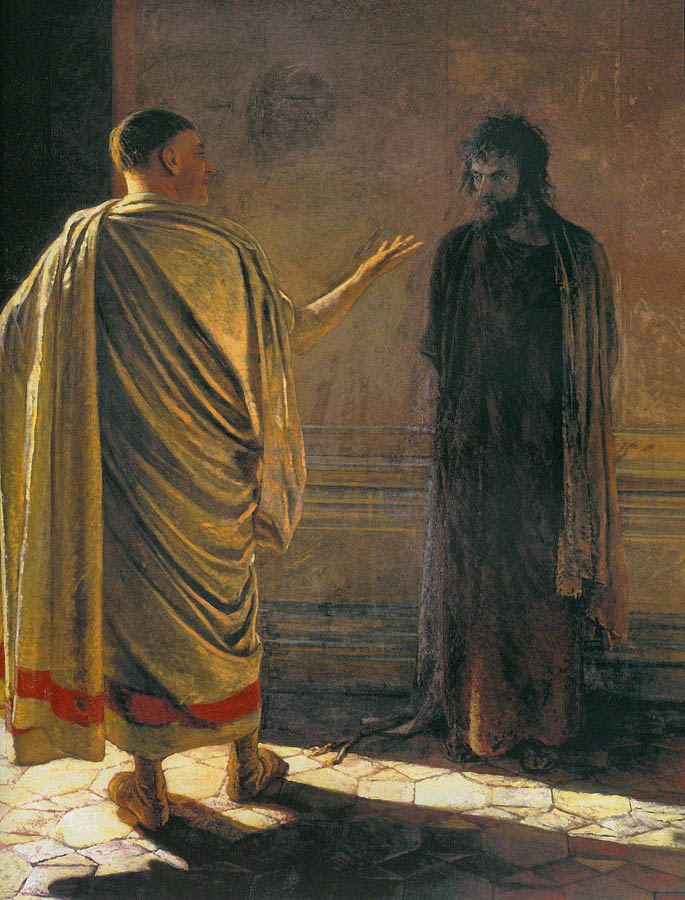
Nikolai Ge "Christ and Pilatus" (What is truth?), 1890

The exact intention of Pilate has been subject to debate among scholars, with no firm conclusion. His statement may have been made in jest that the trial was a mockery, or he may have sincerely intended to reflect on the philosophical position that truth is hard to ascertain. The Greek word rendered as "truth" in English translations is "aletheia", which literally means "unconcealed" and connotes sincerity in addition to factuality and reality; whereas Jesus' use of the term appears to indicate absolute, revealed knowledge.

This verse reflects the Christian tradition of the "guiltlessness of Jesus" in Pilate's Court. The innocence of Jesus is important in the Gospel of John, given that it emphasizes Jesus as the Lamb of God.

In addition to the guiltlessness of Jesus this verse also reflects the rejection of the truth of God: Jesus, the witness to truth, was rejected, ignored and condemned.

== Literary references ==
This verse has been widely quoted and alluded to in culture and literature, particularly in philosophy.

Francis Bacon uses this musing to open his essay Of Truth, saying that Pilate "would not stay for an answer". He uses this to introduce his theme of truth as an affirmation of faith.

Friedrich Nietzsche wrote of the line and extended praise to Pilate:

Do I still have to add that in the entire New Testament there is only one solitary figure one is obliged to respect? Pilate, the Roman governor. To take a Jewish affair seriously – he cannot persuade himself to do that. One Jew more or less – what does it matter ? ... The noble scorn of a Roman before whom an impudent misuse of the word 'truth' was carried on has enriched the New Testament with the only expression which possesses value – which is its criticism, its annihilation even: 'What is truth?' ... (Nietzsche, writing in The Antichrist, §46)

Mikhail Bulgakov fictionally expands on the relationship between Pilate and Jesus in his novel Master and Margarita. Specific reference to John 18:38 comes in Chapter 2 of the novel entitled "Pontius Pilate", in which he asks the very question "What is truth?" to Jesus ("Jeshua Ha-Notsri" – "Jesus of Nazareth" in Hebrew).

J. L. Austin, the ordinary-language philosopher, in a symposium on truth, begins with some paragraphs from the Bacon essay but expands the commentary to many pages, using the approaches of modern logic.

In his novella (and play) Home Truths, David Lodge lets the writer Adrian Ludlow quote "What is truth? said jesting Pilate, and would not stay for an answer" when he is interviewed by the journalist Fanny Tarrant, known for her vicious and perhaps not entirely truthful interviews.

In Robert A. Heinlein's novel Stranger in a Strange Land, principal character Jubal Harshaw, in response to Valentine Michael Smith's query "What is 'truth'?", thinks “('What is Truth?' asked a Roman judge, and washed his hands of a troublesome question. Jubal wished that he could do likewise.)"

In Umberto Eco's novel Foucault's Pendulum one of the characters, Aglie, uses the phrase "Quid est veritas?" as something that was said by "a friend of [his] (...) many years ago" to allude to the fact that Aglie is in fact Count St. Germain, a legendary immortal nobleman that lived for thousands of years.

== See also ==
- Religious views on truth
