= Constance Fenimore Woolson =

American poet

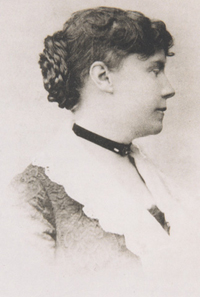
- Photograph of Woolson, c. 1887
- Born: March 5, 1840; Claremont, New Hampshire, US
- Died: January 24, 1894 (aged 53); Venice, Italy
- Resting place: Protestant Cemetery, Rome
- Relatives: James Fenimore Cooper (great uncle)
- Writing career
- Pen name: Anne March (used for The Old Stone House)
- Genres: Novel, short story, poetry, travel narrative

Constance Fenimore Woolson (March 5, 1840 – January 24, 1894) was an American novelist, poet, and short story writer. She was a grandniece of James Fenimore Cooper, and is best known for fictions about the Great Lakes region, the American South, and American expatriates in Europe.

== Life and writings ==
=== In America: the story-writer ===
Woolson was born in Claremont, New Hampshire, but her family soon moved to Cleveland, Ohio, after the deaths of three of her sisters from scarlet fever. Woolson was educated at the Cleveland Female Seminary and a boarding school in New York. She traveled extensively through the midwest and northeastern regions of the U.S. during her childhood and young adulthood.

Woolson's father died in 1869. The following year she began to publish fiction and essays in magazines such as The Atlantic Monthly and Harper's Magazine. Her first full-length publication was a children's book, The Old Stone House (1873). In 1875 she published her first volume of short stories, Castle Nowhere: Lake-Country Sketches, based on her experiences in the Great Lakes region, especially Mackinac Island.

From 1873 to 1879 Woolson spent winters with her mother in St. Augustine, Florida. During these visits she traveled widely in the South which gave her material for her next collection of short stories, Rodman the Keeper: Southern Sketches (1880). After her mother's death in 1879, Woolson went to Europe, staying at a succession of hotels in England, France, Italy, Switzerland and Germany.

=== In Europe: the novelist ===
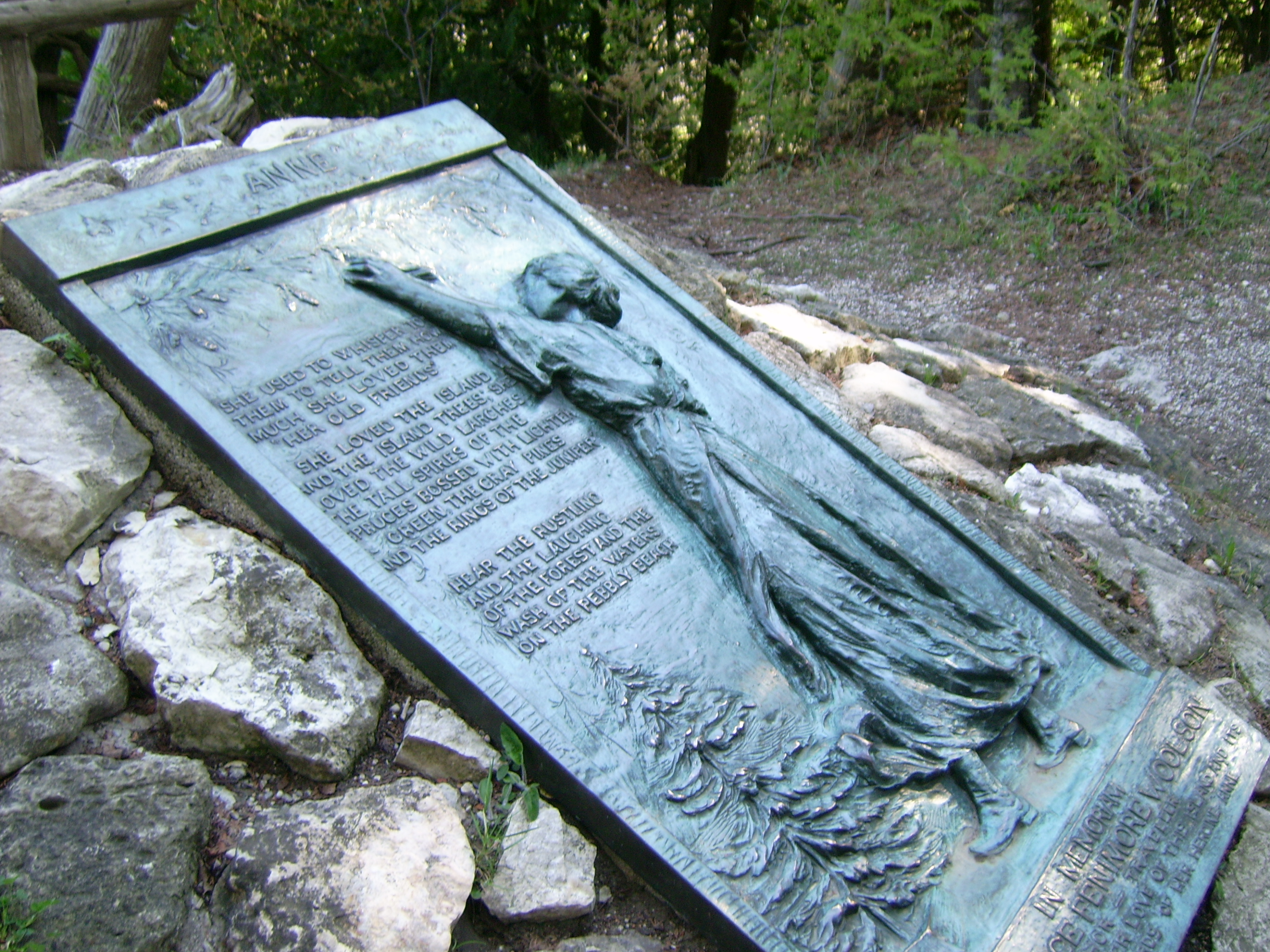
Anne's Tablet

Woolson published her first novel Anne in 1880, followed by three others: East Angels (1886), Jupiter Lights (1889) and Horace Chase (1894). In 1883 she published the novella For the Major, a story of the postwar South that has become one of her most respected fictions. In the winter of 1889–1890 she traveled to Egypt and Greece, which resulted in a collection of travel sketches, Mentone, Cairo and Corfu (published posthumously in 1896).

In 1893 Woolson rented an elegant apartment in the Palazzo Orio Semitecolo Benzon on the Grand Canal of Venice. Suffering from influenza and depression, she either jumped or fell to her death from a fourth story window in the apartment in January 1894, surviving for about an hour after the fall. She was buried in the Protestant Cemetery in Rome and is memorialized by Anne's Tablet on Mackinac Island, Michigan, and a niche with a slender silver trumpet vase in Christ Church in Cooperstown, New York.

Two volumes of her short stories appeared after her death: The Front Yard and Other Italian Stories (1895) and Dorothy and Other Italian Stories (1896).

== Selected works ==
Selected works of Constance Fenimore Woolson were printed (and reprinted) in several volumes of family biography by Woolson's niece, Clare Benedict. Five Generations: 1785-1923 is the general title for three volumes published in 1930: Voices Out of the Past (Vol. 1), Constance Fenimore Woolson (Vol. 2), and The Benedicts Abroad (Vol. 3). Benedict then reprinted the second volume of the series, Constance Fenimore Woolson, in 1932 and added selected published and unpublished materials in "Appendix A." In this reference section, the four volumes Benedict edited are referred to by "Benedict," the volume number, and "(1932)".

=== Novels ===
- The Old Stone House, 1873. (Under pseudonym Anne March.)
- Anne, 1880-1881.
- For the Major, 1882-1883.
- East Angels, 1885-1886.
- Jupiter Lights, 1889.
- Horace Chase, 1893.

=== Short stories ===
- Castle Nowhere: Lake-Country Sketches (1875).
- Rodman the Keeper: Southern Sketches (1880).
- The Front Yard and Other Italian Stories (1895).
- Dorothy and Other Italian Stories (1896).

=== Poetry ===
Many of Woolson's poems are now available in the Chadwick-Healey database LION (Literature On-Line).

- "Charles Dickens. Christmas, 1870."
- "In Memoriam," 1871.
- "Alas," 1871.
- "Thy Will Be Done," 1871.
- "The Herald's Cry," 1872.
- "Love Unexpressed," 1872.
- "Longing," 1872.
- "Walpurgis Night," 1872.
- "The Heart of June," 1872.
- "Ideal. (The Artist Speaks.)" 1872.
- "Corn Fields," 1872.
- "Lake Erie in September," 1872.
- "Floating. Otsego Lake, September, 1872," 1872.
- "October's Song," 1872.
- "Christmas in the City," 1872.
- "Off Thunder Bay," 1872.
- "Two Ways," 1873.
- "Sail-Rock, Lake Superior," 1873.
- "The Greatest of All is Charity," 1873.
- "February," 1873.
- "March," 1873.
- "Commonplace," 1873.
- "Cleopatra," 1873.
- "Memory," 1873.
- "Heliotrope," 1873.
- "Kentucky Belle. (Told in An Ohio Farm-House, 1868)," 1873.
- "The Haunting Face," 1873.
- "Hero Worship," 1873.
- "Delores," 1874.
- "At the Smithy. (Pickens County, South Carolina, 1874.)" 1874.
- "Indian Summer," 1874.
- "Yellow Jessamine," 1874.
- "The Florida Beach," 1874.
- "Pine-Barrens," 1874.
- "Matanzas River," 1874.
- "The Legend of Maria Sanchez Creek," 1875.
- "A Fire in the Forest," 1875.
- "On the Border," 1876.
- "Only the Brakesman," 1876.
- "Morris Island," 1876.
- "Four-Leaved Clover," 1876.
- "On a Homely Woman, Dead," 1876.
- "To George Eliot," 1876.
- "Tom," 1876.
- "Forgotten," 1876.
- "To Jean Ingelow," 1876.
- "Mizpah. Genesis 31.49," 1877.
- "Two Women. 1862," 1877.
- "'I Too!'" 1877.
- "An Intercepted Letter," 1878.
- "To Certain Biographers," 1878.
- "Mentone," 1884.
- "Gettysburg 1876," 1889.
- "In March," 1890.
- "Detroit River."
- "Mackinac–Revisited."
- "Clara 'Bright, Illustrious.'"
- "Contrast. Six O'Clock Broadway."
- "Plum's Picture."
- "We Shall Meet Them Again."
- "Gentleman Waife. (The Animal Kingdom.)"
- "Martins on the Telegraph Wire."
- "Haj you Chorgotten?"
- "The God of February."
- "In the December Twilight."

=== Travel writing and nonfiction ===
- "The Happy Valley."
- "Fairy Island."
- "New York. From Our Special Correspondent."
- "New York. From Our Special Woman Correspondent."
- "Gotham. From Our Own Correspondent."
- "Gotham. From Our Own Correspondent."
- "Gotham. From Our Own Correspondent."
- "Gotham. From Our Own Correspondent."
- "A Day of Mystery."
- "The Haunted Lake."
- "In Search of the Picturesque."
- "American Cities–Detroit."
- "Round by Propeller."
- "Mackinac Island."
- "The Wine Islands of Lake Erie."
- "Lakeshore Relics."
- "A Voyage to the Unknown River."
- "The Ancient City."
- "The French Broad."
- "Up the Ashley and Cooper."
- "Lake Superior."
- "Mackinac."
- "The South Shore of Lake Erie."
- "On The Ohio."
- "The Oklawaha."
- "Pictures of Travel: The Last Summer of the St. Gotthard."
- "The Roman May, and a Walk."
- "At Mentone."
- "Cairo in 1890." Harper's New Monthly Magazine 83 (October–November 1891): 651-74, 828-55. Rpt.
- "Corfu and the Ionian Sea." Harper's New Monthly Magazine 85 (August 1892): 351-370. Rpt.
- Mentone, Cairo, and Corfu.

== Bilingual editions ==
- Miss Grief / Fräulein Kummer. Calambac Publishing House, Germany 2019, bilingual edition: English/German, ISBN 978-3-943117-03-5.

== Critical reception ==
Woolson's short stories have long been regarded as pioneering examples of local color or regionalism. Today, Woolson's novels, short stories, poetry, and travelogues are studied and taught from a range of scholarly and critical perspectives, including feminist, psychoanalytic, gender studies, postcolonial, and new historicism.

In recent decades, critical work on Woolson has blossomed and teaching of Woolson at the high school and university levels has increased. Sharon L. Dean's The Complete Letters of Constance Fenimore Woolson, was published in 2012. Anne Boyd Rioux's Constance Fenimore Woolson: Portrait of a Lady Novelist, published in 2016, is the first full-length biography of Woolson. The Constance Fenimore Woolson Society holds regular conferences and hosts panels at the annual meeting of the American Literature Association and the biennial Society for the Study of American Women Writers conference.

== Friendship with Henry James ==
The relationship between the two writers has prompted much speculation by biographers, especially Lyndall Gordon in her 1998 book, A Private Life of Henry James. Woolson's most famous story, Miss Grief, has been read as a fictionalization of their friendship, though she had not yet met James when she wrote it. Recent novels such as Emma Tennant's Felony (2002), David Lodge's Author, Author (2004), Colm Toibin's The Master (2004), and Elizabeth Maguire's The Open Door (2008) have treated the still unclear relationship between Woolson and James.

== See also ==
- Mary Hartwell Catherwood
