= Home Truths (disambiguation) =

Home Truths is a weekly BBC Radio 4 programme.

Home Truths may also refer to:

- Home Truths (album), a 2021 album by Catherine Britt
- Home Truths (audio drama), a 2008 episode of Doctor Who: The Companion Chronicles
- Home Truths (novella), a 1999 novella by David Lodge
- "Home Truths" (New Tricks), a 2004 television episode
