= The Art of Fiction (book) =

1992 book by David Lodge

- First edition
- Author: David Lodge
- Language: English
- Publisher: Secker & Warburg
- Publication date: October 12, 1992
- Publication place: United Kingdom
- Media type: Print (hardcover, paperback)
- Pages: 224 pp (hardcover)
- ISBN: 0-436-25671-1
- OCLC: 29360234
- Dewey Decimal: 823.009 20
- LC Class: PR826 .L63 1992
- Preceded by: Paradise News
- Followed by: Modern Criticism and Theory: A Reader

The Art of Fiction is a book of literary criticism by the British academic and novelist David Lodge. The chapters of the book first appeared in 1991–1992 as weekly columns in The Independent on Sunday and were eventually gathered into book form and published in 1992. The essays as they appear in the book have in many cases been expanded from their original format.

Lodge focuses each chapter upon one aspect of the art of fiction, comprising some fifty topics pertaining to novels or short stories by English and American writers. Every chapter also begins with a passage from classic or modern literature that Lodge feels embodies the technique or topic at hand. Some of the topics Lodge analyzes are Beginning (the first chapter), The Intrusive Author, The Epistolary Novel, Magic realism, Irony, symbolism, and Metafiction. Among the authors he quotes in order to illustrate his points are Jane Austen, J. D. Salinger, Henry James, Virginia Woolf, Martin Amis, F. Scott Fitzgerald and even himself. In the preface of the book, Lodge informs that this book is for the general reader but technical vocabulary has been used deliberately to educate the reader. He further adds that the alternative title of the book would have been "The Rhetoric of Fiction" had it not been used already by writer Wayne Booth.

== Chapters ==
1. Beginning Jane Austen Emma, Ford Madox Ford, " Emma Woodhouse, handsome, clever and rich ..."
2. The Intrusive Author George Eliot, E. M. Forster
3. Suspense Thomas Hardy
4. Teenage Skaz J. D. Salinger
5. The Epistolary Novel Michael Frayn
6. Point of View Henry James
7. Mystery Rudyard Kipling
8. Names David Lodge, Paul Auster
9. The Stream of Consciousness Virginia Woolf
10. Interior Monologue James Joyce
11. Defamiliarisation Charlotte Brontë
12. The Sense of Place Martin Amis
13. Lists F. Scott Fitzgerald
14. Introducing a Character Christopher Isherwood
15. Surprise William Makepeace Thackeray
16. Time-Shift Muriel Spark
17. The Reader in the Text Laurence Sterne
18. Weather Jane Austen, Charles Dickens
19. Repetition Ernest Hemingway
20. Fancy Prose Vladimir Nabokov
21. Intertextuality Joseph Conrad
22. The Experimental Novel Henry Green
23. The Comic Novel Kingsley Amis
24. Magic Realism Milan Kundera
25. Staying on the Surface Malcolm Bradbury
26. Showing and Telling Henry Fielding
27. Telling in Different Voices Fay Weldon
28. A Sense of the Past John Fowles
29. Imagining the Future George Orwell
30. Symbolism D. H. Lawrence
31. Allegory Samuel Butler
32. Epiphany John Updike
33. Coincidence Henry James
34. The Unreliable Narrator Kazuo Ishiguro
35. The Exotic Graham Greene
36. Chapters etc. Tobias Smollett, Laurence Sterne, Walter Scott, George Eliot, James Joyce
37. The Telephone Evelyn Waugh
38. Surrealism Leonora Carrington
39. Irony Arnold Bennett
40. Motivation George Eliot
41. Duration Donald Barthelme
42. Implication William Cooper
43. The Title George Gissing
44. Ideas Anthony Burgess
45. The Non-Fiction Novel Thomas Carlyle
46. Metafiction John Barth
47. The Uncanny Edgar Allan Poe
48. Narrative Structure Leonard Michaels
49. Aporia Samuel Beckett
50. Ending Jane Austen, William Golding
