= Ginger You're Barmy =

1962 comic novel by David Lodge

- First edition
- Author: David Lodge
- Language: English
- Genre: Comic novel
- Publisher: MacGibbon & Kee
- Publication date: 1962
- Publication place: United Kingdom
- Media type: Print (hardcover, paperback)

Ginger You're Barmy (1962) is a comic novel by David Lodge based on his experiences as a conscript to two years National Service in post-war Britain between August 1955 and August 1957.

== Inspiration ==
In an afterword written in 1981, the author explains that "few postwar novels dealt directly with National Service, especially if you discount those set in places where conscript soldiers were involved in actual combat, such as Malaya, Korea, Suez". He goes on to explain that "most National Servicemen resented, with varying degrees of bitterness, the confiscation of their freedom for two of the best years of their lives" and felt that they "were being maintained as a cheap standing army, occupied with futile and demeaning tasks". Like the narrator, he himself was drafted into the Royal Armoured Corps after graduating in English from London University and did his training at Catterick Camp before working as a clerk in Bovington Camp in Dorset.

The author explained that the structure of the novel proved difficult in that "most of the drama of National Service was concentrated in the first three months, yet the banal tedium of the rest of it was also an essential element of what the novel was 'about'. The solution employed was to use a 'systematic flashback technique, whereby Jonathan's recall of his and his friend's induction to the Army is framed by his record of his last few days of service", this technique having been borrowed, subliminally, from Graham Greene's The Quiet American.

== Title ==
The title comes from the rhyme:

Ginger, you're barmy,
You'll never join the Army,
You'll never be a scout,
With your shirt hanging out,
Ginger, you're barmy.

This rhyme derives from the popular song Ginger you're barmy written by Fred Murray, songwriter (composer of I'm Henery The Eighth I Am), in 1910 and recorded in that year by Harry Champion - included in the Peelennium, no. 43.
