= The History Man (TV series) =

- Genre: Drama
- Based on: The History Man by Malcolm Bradbury
- Written by: Malcolm Bradbury; Christopher Hampton
- Directed by: Robert Knights
- Starring: Antony Sher; Geraldine James; Isla Blair
- Composer: George Fenton
- Country of origin: United Kingdom
- Original language: English
- No. of series: 1
- No. of episodes: 4

Production
- Producer: Michael Wearing
- Running time: 206 minutes
- Production company: BBC

Original release
- Network: BBC2
- Release: 4 January – 25 January 1981

The History Man is a British television drama series which aired in four parts on BBC2 in 1981. It is based on Malcolm Bradbury's 1975 novel of the same title.

== Cast ==
- Antony Sher as Howard Kirk
- Geraldine James as Barbara Kirk
- Isla Blair as Flora Beniform
- Laura Davenport as Annie Callendar
- Paul Brooke as Henry Beamish
- Veronica Quilligan as Felicity Phee
- Maggie Steed as Myra Beamish
- Zienia Merton as Miss Ho
- Lloyd Peters as Michael Bernard
- Julia Swift as Beck Pott
- Steve Plytas as Professor Mangel
- Jonathan Bruton as Martin Kirk
- Charlotte Enderby as Celia Kirk
- Miriam Margolyes as Melissa Tordoroff
- Elizabeth Proud as Moira Millikin
- Graham Padden as John McIntosh
- Michael Hordern as Professor Marvin
- Peter-Hugo Daly as George Carmody
- Arthur Lugo as Hashmi Sadeck
- Henry Moxon as Dr. Petworth
- Judy Liebert as Jane McIntosh
- Milo Sperber as Dr. Zachery
- Bill Buffery as Peter Madden
- Juliet Waley as Marjorie
- Jack Elliott as Leon
- Jane Slaughter as Joanna
- Chloe Salaman as Anne Petty
- Jane Galloway as Chloe

== Bibliography ==
- Hutcheon, Linda; O'Flynn, Siobhan (2013). A Theory of Adaptation. London: Routledge. ISBN 978-0-415-53937-1.
