= Anne's Tablet =

Public art

Coordinates: 45.851981°N 84.615409°W

Anne's Tablet is a 1916 Art Nouveau sculptural installation by William Ordway Partridge located within Mackinac Island State Park adjacent to Fort Mackinac on Mackinac Island. Consisting of stone benches and a bronze plaque, the overlook was built as a memorial to local author Constance Fenimore Woolson.

The text of the tablet is:

Anne

She used to whisper to them

To tell them how much she loved them

‘Her old friends’

She loved the island and the island trees;

She loved the wild larches,

The tall spires of the spruces

Bossed with light green,

The gray pines and the rings of the juniper

Hear the rustling and the laughter of the forest

And the wash of the waters on the pebbly beach

In Memoriam

Constance Fenimore Woolson

Author - Traveller

Has expressed her love of this island and its beauty in the words of her heroine ‘Anne’.

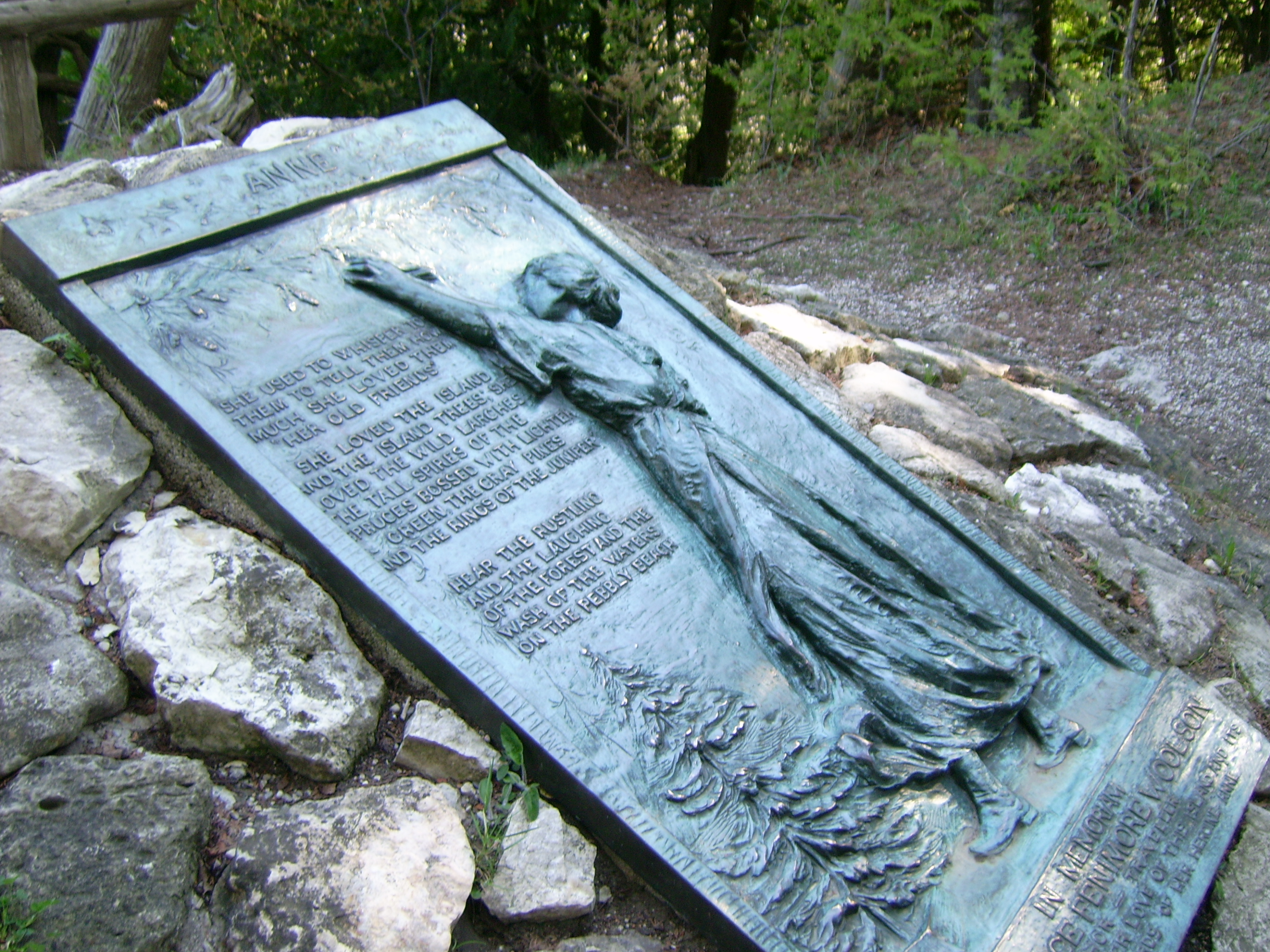
Anne's Tablet

== Background ==
Woolson (1840–1894), a member of a prominent Cleveland family of means, as a girl summered on Mackinac Island in a now-vanished building located directly below the overlook. The experience inspired her to become a professional writer, and in 1875 she published her first volume of short stories, Castle Nowhere: Lake-Country Sketches, based on her experiences on Mackinac Island and in surrounding shorelines of the Great Lakes. The work was followed by Woolson's first novel, Anne. Also set on Mackinac Island, the work was published in 1880.

Woolson's success at conveying the dilemmas faced by young Victorian-era women in a regionalist setting inspired further works from the increasingly successful author set in new homes in St. Augustine, Florida and in Venice. Unfortunately, the popular writer's personal attachment to Henry James was not fully reciprocated, and the depressed author fell from a Venetian window in 1894.

As Woolson was buried in Italy, there was no location in the United States where her American-born readers could pay their respects. The Anne's Tablet installation was constructed as a gift from Samuel Livingston Mather II, a successful iron ore mineowner and nephew of the writer.
