= Deaf Sentence =

2008 novel by David Lodge

- First edition (publ. Harvill Secker)
- Author: David Lodge
- Language: English
- Publication date: 2008

Deaf Sentence (2008) is a novel by British author David Lodge.

== Setting and characters ==
The story begins in November 2006 (reference is made to the execution of Saddam Hussein on 30 December 2006) and is set mainly in a Midlands city that may be "Rummidge", the avatar of Birmingham in David Lodge's campus novels.

Desmond Bates, 65, is a retired professor of linguistics, a widower who has remarried; he is profoundly deaf.

His wife, Winnifred, 59, a Catholic who was previously divorced and then married him, runs a successful interior design shop.

His father, 89, a former professional jazz musician, lives in London, in the "Brickley" house where Bates spent his childhood (David Lodge's own childhood neighbourhood is Brockley, in the London Borough of Lewisham).

Alex Loom, 27, is an American doctoral student who has emigrated to Britain.

== Plot summary ==
At a cocktail party, Bates has a long conversation with a young woman but cannot hear a word she says. A few days later she telephones him to say he has missed their appointment; they arrange another, though he does not know what it is about. When they meet, she tells him she is writing a doctorate on the last letters of suicidal people, and asks him to supervise her thesis in place of the professor in charge, Colin Butterworth, a rather ambitious academic. He agrees to help her informally.

A little later she emails him a chapter, along with a strange document: a manual for writing suicide notes. He meets the professor in charge of Alex, who seems very reluctant to talk about her. She also behaves oddly, alternating between actions or proposals that compromise him and pitiful pleas for forgiveness.

Meanwhile, he describes his relationships with those close to him, especially his father, whom he visits monthly. During an evening with friends, he undertakes to learn lip-reading.

December 2006

He tries to keep a certain distance from Alex, but she manages to get Winnifred to invite her for Boxing Day. He takes several lip-reading classes, in which he takes some interest, while preparing for the festive season, which brings many difficulties. Boxing Day itself turns out to be rather disastrous. His father then begins to show the first symptoms of Alzheimer's, which are confirmed after his return to London.

January 2007

For New Year, the Bateses go with their friends to an aquatic leisure centre. Desmond spoils the end of the stay by becoming totally deaf for several hours after a sauna session. Soon afterwards, he is invited at short notice to give a lecture tour in Poland; his son recommends that he visit the Auschwitz camp, which he personally does not think a good idea. Then Colin Butterworth asks him to intervene with Alex, with whom he has been indiscreet and who is blackmailing him; he also tells Desmond that Alex's father committed suicide when she was 13. Desmond meets Alex and dissuades her from acting against Butterworth.

February 2007

He resumes his journal after a long interruption: his father was hospitalised while he was in Poland, and died a few days after his return. Of the trip, he recounts only the visit to Auschwitz. In this episode the narrator cites a letter written in November 1944 by a member of the Sonderkommando to his wife, found in 1945 near a crematorium at Birkenau. The novel attributes the letter to "Chaim Herman", the name under which it was long known. Since 2019 it has been attributed to Hersz Strasfogel (in French), a French prisoner of Polish origin who was killed in November 1944. Alex contacts him again, but he cuts off all contact, personal and academic. Soon afterwards, he receives an email from her announcing her suicide. But it emerges that she has left Britain, leaving a fair amount of debt behind.

March 2007

He prepares his father's house for sale and resumes his lip-reading classes.

== Analysis ==
=== Narration ===
The text is divided into 20 chapters.

The narration is organised around the main character, Desmond Bates, either through his personal journal or, from time to time, through an external narrator who recounts or explains certain events and issues, but always from Bates's point of view.

=== Themes ===
Major themes

- the problems of deafness
- ageing and Alzheimer's disease

Minor themes

- contemporary tourism (the Center Parcs phenomenon)
