= Anne (novel) =

1880 book by Constance Fenimore Woolson

Anne is a novel first published in 1880 by author Constance Fenimore Woolson, noted as a work of American literary regionalism.

== Plot ==
It depicts the emotional and spiritual conflicts faced by its eponymous heroine as she leaves her home village, Mackinac Island, to seek a future as a young woman in the Northeastern United States. Her good qualities win her many suitors, but she finds hypocrisy and dysfunctional social relationships among the wealthier strata of U.S. Victorian society. Eventually she selects a suitor who, although of wealthy origins, has lost his means and is ready to accept the stolid virtues of the American working class. Anne Douglas returns with her new partner to her place of origin.

== Publication history and response ==
Anne was first published through serialization in Harper's New Monthly Magazine. Upon republication as a book in 1882, the work became a bestseller and was reviewed in The Nation, The Century, and other leading periodicals of the day. Many readers and reviewers appreciated the book, as it depicted a wide variety of settings and social circumstances, with a particular eye for the picturesque elements to be seen on the shores of northern Lake Huron inhabited by persons who had come to live in harmony with the ecology of the Great Lakes. Woolson's sentimental depiction of a rural setting was attractive to a readership increasingly tied to smoky, industrial cities.

Among the earliest to recognize Woolson's talent was critic Horace Scudder, who anticipated she would eventually be elevated into the American literary canon alongside great writers like Ralph Waldo Emerson and Henry Wadsworth Longfellow. His review of Anne in The Atlantic Monthly, however, noted the "immaturity of the book" and predicted it would be remembered "chiefly as a marking stage in the author's development".

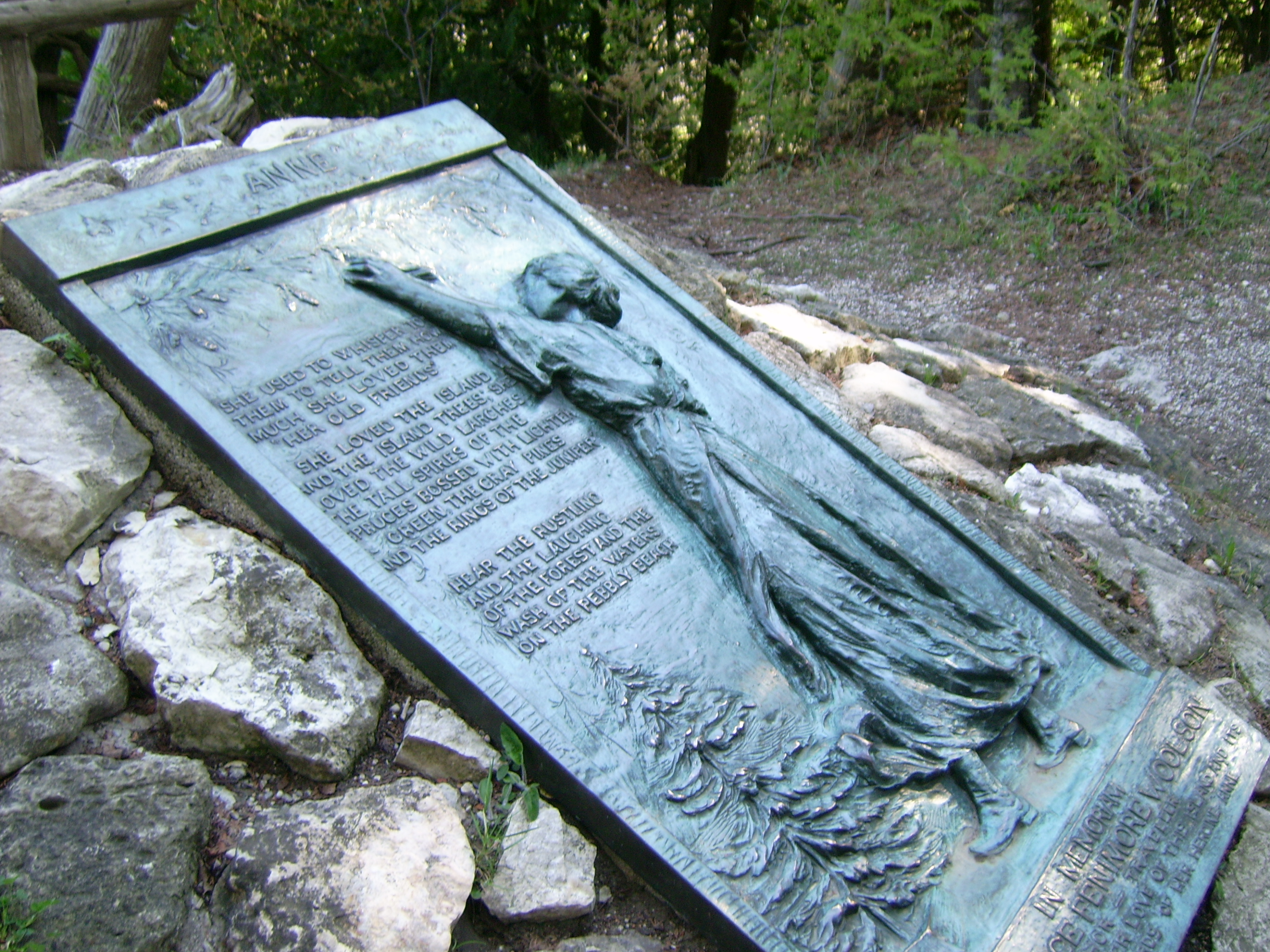
1916 illustration of character Anne

Anne was republished as a volume in 1882 by Harper and Brothers. Sales of the novel faded with changing literary tastes; Woolson admirer Anne Boyd Rioux confessed in 2014 that "self-sacrificing heroines like Margaret in East Angels and Anne in Anne seem almost impossibly good to our eyes today." The work's copyright has expired and it is in the public domain in its country of publication, the United States. Anne's Tablet, erected on Mackinac Island in 1916, is a tribute to author Woolson and to Anne.
