= Out of the Shelter =

1970 novel by David Lodge

- First edition
- Author: David Lodge
- Language: English
- Publisher: Macmillan
- Publication date: 1970
- Publication place: United Kingdom
- Media type: Print (Hardback, Paperback)

Out of the Shelter is a 1970 novel by British author David Lodge. It was longlisted for the Booker Prize.

== Plot ==
Timothy Young, at five, enjoys having to go to his neighbour's shelter during the Blitz, partly because he gets to sleep with his friend Jill. However, Jill and her mother are killed in an air raid. Timothy spends some of the war in the country before he and his rather narrow-minded Catholic parents return to their lower-middle-class neighbourhood in London. He sees his sister Kath, who is eleven years older, only on her rare visits home, as she is now working in Germany with the occupying forces.

In 1951, he faces a decision of whether to apply his mathematical and artistic talent to an apprenticeship as a draughtsman or to the study of architecture at university. Kath invites him to visit her in Heidelberg during the summer. After some trepidation, he agrees. The boat and train journeys are highly unpleasant, but he is befriended by a young American man with unconventional views, Don Kowalski. Kath's life in Heidelberg is far more luxurious than anything Timothy knew in England, where some basic foods are still rationed and economic growth is slow. He joins in the good meals, games, and pleasure trips Kath has with her fun-loving friends, especially two Americans, Greg and Vince. Timothy lives surreptitiously in an empty room in a woman's hostel. When he spends a day with Rudolf, the young German porter of Kath's residence, and his family, he sees the much lower German standard of living and deals with his conflicted feelings about the Germans. He also visits an American family with boys his own age and the American school where Don teaches, but does not get along well there.

His sexual awakening includes hearing his neighbour in the hostel having sex, seeing Kath in bed with Don (who has been sacked because he had been a conscientious objector), refusing a sexual offer from a woman in the hostel, and developing an infatuation with an American girl. He finally meets her at another American girl's birthday party on a riverboat and then has an erotic encounter with her in his room.

Kath's routine is disturbed when Greg and Vince disappear on a trip to Berlin, but they return a few days later, apparently having strayed into the Russian zone and been interrogated as possible spies. Timothy goes to a party with Kath where she and her friends dress up in Vince's collection of Nazi uniforms and medals. Don breaks up this nightmarish scene and reveals that Vince has had a sexual relationship with Rudolf, possibly extorting sexual favours in return for help denazifying Rudolf's father.

An epilogue takes place in a motel in California, where Timothy, now a thirty-year-old academic in Environmental Studies, and his wife and sons are visiting Kath, who is still single. It is revealed that Vince and Greg were both homosexual and their disappearance in Berlin was an attempt to defect to the Soviets. Don is now a professor and has been married and divorced. Timothy reflects on how lucky he is to have a good career and a loving family when things have not gone so well for others.

== Origins ==
The most autobiographical of Lodge's novels, it reflects the author's own rite of passage in Heidelberg visiting a young aunt, though he points out a number of differences between his visit and what happened in the novel. The naive tone of the narration, especially that of Timothy's early childhood, alters as he matures.

In the afterword to the 1984 edition, Lodge explains the novel's origins, as well as the serious problems with the typesetting of the earlier edition.

== See also ==
- Bildungsroman
