= Thinks ... =

2001 novel by David Lodge

- First edition
- Author: David Lodge
- Language: English
- Publisher: Secker & Warburg
- Publication date: 2001
- Publication place: United Kingdom
- Media type: Print (hardcover, paperback)
- ISBN: 0-436-44502-6
- OCLC: 45337662

Thinks ... is a 2001 novel by British author David Lodge. The novel concerns the extramarital affairs between faculty members at a fictional British university.

== Plot ==
Helen Reed, an English novelist in her early forties, arrives at the University of Gloucester to spend the term there as "writer-in-residence" and to teach a creative writing class. Still grieving over the death of her beloved husband, Helen thinks a change of scenery might be a good idea to get over her loss. Apart from the English Department, she is intrigued by the department of Cognitive Science and by its head, 50-year-old Ralph Messenger, to whom she is introduced at a social function very soon during her stay. Helen feels curiously attracted by Messenger but she soon learns about his reputation as a womaniser.

When a student submits some chapters from the novel she is writing, Helen recognises one of the male characters as having been modelled on her late husband Martin. Gradually it dawns upon Helen that her husband must have had a succession of young lovers, with everyone except herself knowing everything. During a fundraising event, Messenger's wife Carrie tells Helen she knows about her own husband's flings and, by taking a lover herself, tries to get back at him. Ralph Messenger, she is quite sure, does not know anything about her affair. Helen decides to get on with her life and allows herself to be drawn into an affair with Messenger. Soon, Helen ponders whether she is falling in love with him.

When he is waiting for Helen in her maisonette, Messenger cannot resist the temptation to turn on her laptop and read parts of her journal. This is how he learns about his wife's infidelity. When Helen enters her apartment, his jealousy gets the better of him so that he cannot hide the fact that he has invaded her privacy.

Ralph Messenger undergoes surgery, after which he loses his reputation as a woman-chaser. In 1999, he publishes a new book entitled Machine Living and in due course is awarded a CBE. He never confronts Carrie with her affair and remains married to her. Helen Reed returns to London and resumes writing. In the following year she publishes Crying is a Puzzler, a novel about life on campus quite similar to that of the University of Gloucester.

== Reception ==
The Guardian gave a neutral review, noting the similarities between Thinks... and Lodge's other "campus novels", as well as Lodge's use of his characters as philosophical mouthpieces. Literary website Bookish Thoughts called Thinks... "a thought experiment on the nature of consciousness" even as it cautioned readers about extensive and explicit discussions of sex.

== Publication details ==
- Secker & Warburg, 2001, ISBN 0-436-44502-6
- Penguin Books, 2002, ISBN 0-14-200086-8 (United States).
- Penguin Books Ltd, 2005, ISBN 0-14-100021-X (United Kingdom).
