= Author, Author (novel) =

2004 novel by David Lodge

- First edition (UK)
- Author: David Lodge
- Language: English
- Publisher: Secker & Warburg (UK); Viking Press (US)
- Publication date: 7 October 2004
- Publication place: United Kingdom
- Media type: Print (Hardcover)
- Pages: 400 pages
- ISBN: 0-670-03349-9
- OCLC: 55671844
- Dewey Decimal: 823/.914 22
- LC Class: PR6062.O36 A95 2004

Author, Author is a novel by David Lodge, written in 2004. The book is based on the life of the author Henry James. It was released at about the same time as The Master by Colm Tóibín and other books about James, and Lodge wrote The Year of Henry James: The Story of a Novel about this. Lodge populates his novel with several of the most famous figures of English literature from the time of the book's setting in the late nineteenth century.

== Plot summary ==
The novel opens with a framing device wherein we are shown what is happening in the London home of the dying novelist at the beginning of World War I. One of the servant staff in James' house has taken a crude but sincere interest in discovering what her employer's books are all about and takes to reading one of his more famous stories, The Beast in the Jungle. This story, whose hero is obsessed by a paranoid belief that his life will be marked by an unknown catastrophe, provides the opening for the novel proper to begin.

Now we proceed back in time to the middle years of James' life and are introduced to a large and interesting group of James' literary acquaintances from his period of expatriation in England. Among those we meet are George du Maurier, George Bernard Shaw, H. G. Wells and Robert Louis Stevenson. The long and productive friendship between James and du Maurier is described in great detail, including the story of du Maurier's deteriorating eyesight which threatens his livelihood as a cartoonist for the magazine Punch. He is finally driven to write fiction himself and he astonishes James and the entire literary world by producing the bestselling novel Trilby. Much of Lodge's book is built upon James' own obsession with attracting a larger readership than his opaque books have yet garnered and the success of Trilby both baffles and annoys him.

Meanwhile, James is writing prolifically himself with little comparable financial or critical success. We are given a long and funny account of James' humiliating quest to write a popular play for the London stage. There is an ironic and entertaining distance set up here between James' feelings of failure and inadequacy and what we now know about his final reputation. While du Maurier and Trilby have all but faded from the public view, James' body of work has continued to attract readers worldwide and his position as one of the most important figures in literature is now secure. In this sense, the novel can be seen as both an homage and as an artistic attempt to rescue the historical James from his own feeling of obscurity.

The book also includes a portrait of the friendship that James formed during this time with the American author Constance Fenimore Woolson. Lodge suggests that their relationship had a romantic (but unconsummated) dimension. As in real life, Woolson commits suicide while traveling in Italy and this leads James to wonder what connection, if any, there might have been between her death and her feelings for him. Lodge's depiction of their relationship allows him subtly to explore James' alleged lifelong virginity and to conjecture somewhat about his notorious prudishness.

== Editions ==
- Viking Press, 2004, ISBN 0-670-03349-9 (USA).
- Penguin Books, 2005, ISBN 0-14-101822-4 (United Kingdom).
