= The British Museum Is Falling Down =

Book by David Lodge

The British Museum is Falling Down
- First edition
- Author: David Lodge
- Language: English
- Publisher: MacGibbon & Kee at first in 1965, Martin Secker & Warburg Ltd 1981, Penguin Books 1983
- Publication place: United Kingdom

The British Museum is Falling Down is a comic novel by the British author David Lodge about a 25-year-old poverty-stricken student of English literature who, rather than work on his thesis (The Structure of Long Sentences in Three Modern English Novels) in the reading room of the British Museum, is distracted time and again from his work and who gets into trouble instead.

== Dedications and citations in the preamble ==
This novel is dedicated to "Derek Todd in affectionate memory of BM days and to Malcolm Bradbury whose fault it mostly is that I have tried to write a comic novel."

Two quotes respectively from Oscar Wilde and from Dr Johnson then appear : "Life imitates art and I would be a papist if I could. I have fear enough, but an obstinate rationality prevents me." Moreover, each chapter at the beginning or introduction has its specific quote.

== Summary ==
Set in Swinging London, the novel describes one day in the life of Adam Appleby, who lives in constant fear that his wife might be pregnant again with a fourth child in a small flat in Battersea. As Catholics, they are denied any form of contraception and have to play "Vatican roulette" instead. Adam and Barbara have three children: Clare, Dominic, and Edward; their friends ask if they "intend working through the whole alphabet".

In the course of only one busy day several chances to make some money present themselves to Adam. For example, he is offered the opportunity to edit a deceased scholar's unpublished manuscripts; however, when he eventually has a look at them, he feels uncomfortable, realizing that the man's writings are worthless drivel. Also, at the house in Bayswater where he is supposed to get the papers, Adam has to cope with an assortment of weird characters ranging from butchers to a young virgin intent on seducing him.

Lodge's novel makes extensive use of pastiche, incorporating passages where both the motifs and the styles of writing used by various authors are imitated. For instance, there is a Kafkaesque scene in which Adam has to renew his ticket for the British Museum Reading Room. The final chapter of the novel is a monologue by Adam's wife in the style of Molly Bloom's soliloquy in Ulysses.

This use of different styles mirrors James Joyce's Ulysses, a work that is also about a single day. When Lodge's novel first came out quite a number of reviewers and critics, not appreciating the literary allusions, found fault with Lodge for his unhomogeneous writing but in an Afterword written in 1980, he said that in later editions when "the blurb carefully drew attention to the parodies, they were duly noticed and generally approved."
