= The Picturegoers =

1960 novel by David Lodge

- First edition
- Author: David Lodge
- Language: English
- Publisher: MacGibbon & Kee
- Publication date: 1960
- Publication place: United Kingdom
- Media type: Print (hardcover, paperback)

The Picturegoers (1960) is the first novel by British writer David Lodge.

The novel relates the story of a group of Roman Catholics residing in London. It interweaves scenes at and near Brickley Palladium in south-east London with characters like Mark Underwood, a Catholic undergraduate, and Clare representing different attitudes to religion. The novel delves into the relationship of Mark and Clare and the tension that starts to redefine their personalities. Movies are used as a touchstone for exploring Catholic values in a changing world, where the cinema introduces values and behaviours from the greater society that differ from those of the traditional community. Various characters are portrayed, representing, to a certain extent, common types of people in a small earlyish twentieth-century British London neighbourhood, though the focus is on one lower-middle-class family.
