= Paradise News =

1991 novel by David Lodge

- First edition
- Author: David Lodge
- Cover artist: Paul Cox
- Language: English
- Publisher: Secker & Warburg
- Publication date: 1991
- Publication place: United Kingdom
- Media type: Print (hardcover, paperback)
- Pages: 294 pp (hardcover)
- ISBN: 0-436-25668-1 (Secker & Warburg), ISBN 0-670-84228-1 (Viking)
- OCLC: 24653478
- Dewey Decimal: 823/.914 20
- LC Class: PR6062.O36 P37 1991

Paradise News (1991) is a novel by British author David Lodge. The novel explores the notion of paradise on earth and in heaven.

== Plot summary ==
The story begins with Bernard, a laicised Catholic priest, escorting his unwilling father Jack to Hawaii at the request of his aunt Ursula, who is dying of cancer. On the day after arrival, Jack is hit by a car and sent to hospital. Bernard spends much time travelling between Jack's bedside and Ursula's nursing home, and through this, gets the opportunity to discover their past. Ursula, always portrayed as the selfish black sheep, had been sexually abused as a child by her oldest brother Sean, who was venerated as a hero by the family for his death in the war. Ursula explains to Bernard that the experience ruined her marriage and her life. She wants Jack's apology for Jack knew of the abuse but kept silent. In the midst of this, Bernard strikes up a tentative relationship with Yolande Miller, the driver of the car that hit his father. Bernard's gradual sexual awakening parallels Ursula's struggle with her illness.

The narrative switches between third-person prose, Bernard's diary, a long letter from Bernard to Yolande, and postcards and notes sent from Hawaii by various characters encountered by Bernard and Jack on the plane journey from England, concluding with a letter from Yolande to Bernard.

== Reception ==
Carlin Romano, reviewing the book for The Philadelphia Inquirer, complimented the book's comedy, as well as the overall "craftsmanship". Richard Dyer, in The Boston Globe, thought that the satire of the book worked so well because of its realism and Lodge's eye for detail. In the Sunday Telegraph, Anthony Thwaite found the book left him with a "mild, and thoughtful, glow of happiness". Zoë Heller, of The Independent, on the other hand felt that the book often felt like it was trying too hard to impress the reader.
