= How Far Can You Go? =

1980 novel by David Lodge

- First edition
- Author: David Lodge
- Language: English
- Publisher: Secker & Warburg
- Publication date: 1980
- Publication place: United Kingdom
- Media type: Print (hardcover, paperback)
- Pages: 244
- ISBN: 0-436-25661-4

How Far Can You Go? (1980) is a novel by British writer and academic David Lodge. It was renamed Souls and Bodies when published in the United States. It won the Whitbread Book of the Year award (1980), and went straight into paperback in Penguin Books in 1981.

== Plot summary ==
The book deals with the intersecting lives of a group of English Catholics from their years as students at University College London in the early 1950s up to the late 1970s. The characters are confronted with a wide range of issues and experiences including marriage, contraception, adultery, illness, grief and, most important of all, the changes in the Catholic Church brought about by the Second Vatican Council and the papal encyclical against contraception, Humanae vitae (1968).

The title's meaning is twofold: it is on the one hand a reference to how far you ought to go with a member of the other sex before marriage, but also to the question of disorientation in the face of abrupt changes in the Church within only a few years.

== Major themes ==
The novel is a satire on life for young English Catholics in the 1950s and 1960s, depicting them juggling the pressures of youth, sexual desire and the modern world with rigid rules about the avoidance of pleasures, the shame of disappointing Christ and the Virgin, and the fear of hell. Yet it also describes how the loss of faith leads to disorientation and sadness in the characters.

== Cover image ==
As explained in the novel, "The name of the game was Salvation, the object to get to heaven and avoid Hell. It was like Snakes and Ladders: sin sent you plummeting down towards the Pit; the sacraments, good deeds, acts of self-mortification, enabled you to climb back towards the light."
