= Therapy (Lodge novel) =

1995 novel by David Lodge

- First edition
- Author: David Lodge
- Cover artist: Edvard Munch, with a painted set design for a scene from Ghosts, a play by Henrik Ibsen.
- Language: English
- Publisher: Martin Secker & Warburg ltd
- Publication date: 1995
- Publication place: United Kingdom
- Media type: Print (hardcover, paperback)
- Pages: 338
- ISBN: 0-436-20334-0 (hardcover), ISBN 0-436-20255-7 (paperback)
- OCLC: 37310193
- LC Class: PR6062.O36 T48 1995b

Therapy is a 1995 British novel by David Lodge. It concerns a successful sitcom writer, Laurence Passmore, plagued by middle-age neuroses and a failed marriage. His only problem seems to be an "internal derangement of the knee" but a mid-life crisis has struck him and he is discovering angst. Cognitive therapy, aromatherapy, and acupuncture all offer no help, and he becomes obsessed with the philosophy of Kierkegaard. Moreover, Tubby, as Passmore is nicknamed, undertakes a pilgrimage to Santiago de Compostela in order to find his first love.

The novel is divided into four parts. The first part is written as a journal, the second part is written in dramatic monologues, the third part consists of journal entries and a memoir and the fourth part is a narrative written after the events happened and Tubby has returned to London.

== Overview ==
In the epigraph, Lodge quotes the Collins Dictionary definition of the word "therapy", excepts from correspondence to Søren Kierkegaard from his uncle Christian Lund, and a quote by Graham Greene that "writing is a form of therapy".

In the first part, Tubby starts writing a journal triggered by a description he had to write for his cognitive behavior therapist. Before that Tubby wrote only screenplays but no narrative texts. During the writing Tubby reflects upon his problems and depression.

In the second part, written in the form of dramatic monologues, presents an outward look on Tubby, but the reader finds out later that the monologues were written by Tubby himself, disrupting the seeming objectivity. The reader cannot step out of Tubby's perspective but reads everything filtered through his eyes.

In the third part, the reader is presented the memoir about Maureen, Tubby's first love and his first girlfriend. It is by writing down their story that Tubby realizes what his problem is: he betrayed Maureen by dumping her in front of their friends.

The fourth part is written by Tubby looking backward on the events. He tells about his travel to Spain where he searched for Maureen on the Way of St. James. It is there that Tubby comes to terms with his problems and finds peace.

== Themes ==
=== Therapy and mental health ===
The story of this book, dedicated to Lodge's father, satirizes the therapy industry.

=== Kierkegaardian philosophy ===
While writing his journal and looking up words and names, Tubby encounters the writings of Søren Kierkegaard. A list of Kierkegaard book titles catches his attention and motivates him to delve into Kierkegaard's journals and publications. Tubby feels that he and Kierkegaard have experienced similar difficulties. For example, Tubby likens his being mocked in a magazine article to Kierkegaard's Corsair Affair; and the way Tubby dumps Maureen, he feels, is akin to Kierkegaard's breakup with Regine. Tubby struggles to find a way out of his depression. Even though Tubby denies Christianity it may be interpreted that he undergoes the three (Kierkegaardian) existential stages of 'the Aesthetic', 'the Ethical' and 'the Religious' and takes leaps of faith to move from one stage to another.
