= Home Truths (novella) =

1999 novella by David Lodge

- First edition
- Author: David Lodge
- Language: English
- Publisher: Secker & Warburg
- Publication date: 1999
- Publication place: United Kingdom
- Media type: Print (Paperback)
- Pages: 114 pp
- ISBN: 978-0-436-20524-8
- OCLC: 42040086

Home Truths (1999) is a novella by British author David Lodge.

Lodge adapted it from his play of the same name, performed at the Birmingham Repertory Theatre in 1998.

== Plot summary ==
The story deals with the cult of the celebrity interview. Its main characters include Adrian Ludlow, a semi-retired novelist, his wife Eleanor Ludlow, scriptwriter Sam Sacks, and journalist Fanny Tarrant, famous for sarcastic portraits of her interviewees. After Tarrant writes a scathing interview with Sacks, the scriptwriter persuades his old friend Ludlow to be interviewed by her, and to produce his own indictment of the journalist. Sacks's plan for revenge is compromised when Ludlow is charmed by Tarrant and reveals more than he should.

== Reception ==
The Guardian was unconvinced by the conversion from stage, suggesting that the novella "tends towards the flat promise of a script rather than the fully realised complexity of a three-dimensional fictional world".

Kirkus Reviews also thought it stagey, but found it overcame this, calling it "A deft bit of Lodgian satire of writers, media, and writing – with teeth as sharp as ever, but also with a heart, however little be the book, that’s great, large, and full."
