= David Lodge (author) =

English writer (1935–2025)

David Lodge CBE FRSL
- Lodge in 2009
- Born: David John Lodge; 28 January 1935; London, England
- Died: 1 January 2025 (aged 89); Birmingham, England
- Occupations: Writer; author; literary critic
- Children: 3
- Writing career
- Notable awards: Hawthornden Prize; 1975

David John Lodge CBE FRSL (28 January 1935 – 1 January 2025) was an English novelist and critic. He was a literature professor at the University of Birmingham until 1987, and some of his novels satirise academic life, notably the "Campus Trilogy" – Changing Places: A Tale of Two Campuses (1975), Small World: An Academic Romance (1984) and Nice Work (1988). The latter two were shortlisted for the Booker Prize. Another theme is Roman Catholicism, beginning from his first published novel The Picturegoers (1960).

Lodge also wrote television screenplays and three stage plays. After retiring, he continued to publish literary criticism. His edition of Twentieth Century Literary Criticism (1972) includes essays on 20th-century writers such as T. S. Eliot. In 1992, he published The Art of Fiction, a collection of essays on literary techniques with illustrative examples from great authors, such as "Point of View" (Henry James), "The Stream of Consciousness" (Virginia Woolf) and "Interior Monologue" (James Joyce), beginning with "Beginning" and ending with "Ending".

Lodge's works were widely recognised with literary, and other national and international honours. He was appointed Chevalier de l'Ordre des Arts et des Lettres in 1997 and became a Commander of the Order of the British Empire (CBE) the following year.

== Biography ==
Lodge was born in Dulwich and brought up in nearby Brockley, south-east London. His family home until 1959 was 81 Millmark Grove, a residential street of 1930s terraced houses between Brockley Cross and Barriedale. His father, a saxophonist, played in a dance band. Lodge's first published novel, The Picturegoers (1960), draws on early experiences in "Brickley" (based on Brockley) and his childhood home, which he revisits again in later novels, Therapy (1995), Deaf Sentence (2008) and Quite A Good Time to be Born: A Memoir (2015). The Second World War forced Lodge and his mother to evacuate to Surrey and Cornwall. He attended the Catholic St Joseph's Academy, Blackheath.

=== University studies ===
In 1952, Lodge entered University College London, where he gained a first-class Bachelor of Arts degree in 1955. There he met his future wife, Mary Frances Jacob, as a fellow student, when they were 18. He wrote a first, unpublished novel (1953): The Devil, the World and the Flesh. After graduating from university, Lodge spent two years in the Royal Armoured Corps on national service, which provided a basis for his novel Ginger You're Barmy. He then returned to London University, earning a Master of Arts in 1959 for a thesis on "The Catholic Novel from the Oxford Movement to the Present Day".

=== Family and early career ===
In 1959, Lodge and Jacob married at the age of 24. Lodge later said, "It seems extraordinary now. I had no prospects, no job, little money, but it never bothered me. We didn't really want children at the point they came along, but we got on with it." They had children in 1960 and 1963, a son and a daughter, and a second son, Christopher, born in 1966 with Down's syndrome.

From 1959 to 1960, Lodge taught English in London for the British Council. In 1960, he gained a job as a lecturer at the University of Birmingham, where he was preparing a PhD thesis on the Oxford Movement. At Birmingham, Lodge met the novelist Malcolm Bradbury, who was to become his "closest writer friend"; the example of Bradbury's comic writing was, according to Lodge, a big influence on the development of his work in this respect. In 1963, Lodge collaborated with Bradbury and another student, James Duckett, on a satirical revue for the Birmingham Repertory Theatre entitled Between These Four Walls, performed in the autumn of 1963. The cast included Julie Christie. During the performance of a certain skit that involved a radio being played on stage, Lodge and the audience heard news of the assassination of John F. Kennedy

Some members of the audience had caught the words and tittered uneasily, taking it as a joke in poor taste. In the interval everybody discovered the awful truth, and the second half of the show fell very flat."

In August 1964, Lodge and his family went to the United States, on a scholarship from the Harkness Commonwealth Fellowship. Lodge had to travel at least three months out of twelve in the United States, with a car provided by the donor. The family first lived in Providence, Rhode Island, where David Lodge followed the American literature course at Brown University. During this period, free of teaching obligations, Lodge was able to complete a third novel, The British Museum Is Falling Down. Lodge's original title for the novel was The British Museum Has Lost Its Charm, a line from a George and Ira Gershwin song, but he was refused permission to use it by the Gershwin Publishing Corporation. In March 1965 the family went on a trip across the country, eventually moving to San Francisco.

In 1966, Lodge published his first book of academic criticism, Language of Fiction and in 1967 defended his doctoral thesis for a PhD in English awarded in 1967 by Birmingham University.

=== Later career ===
From 1967 to 1987, Lodge continued his academic career at the University of Birmingham, becoming Professor of English Literature in 1976, while writing several more novels and essays. In 1969, he became an associate professor at the University of California, Berkeley. Lodge retired from his post at Birmingham in 1987 to become a full-time writer,

"It was the right time to leave. All my former colleagues say: 'You are well out of it.' There's a weary disillusion to university life now and that's a shame because, when I was there, there was excitement, a joie de vivre. Now it has become like a machine, servicing large numbers of students, and much less attractive and interesting."

He retained the title of Honorary Professor of Modern English Literature and continued to live in Birmingham. Some of his papers are housed in the University Library's Special Collections. In 1997, Lodge was made a Chevalier de l'Ordre des Arts et Lettres by the French Ministry of Culture. In the 1998 New Years Honours list, he was appointed CBE for his services to literature.

=== Death ===
Lodge died in Birmingham on 1 January 2025, at the age of 89.

== Works ==
=== Overview ===
Lodge's first published novels evoke the atmosphere of post-war England (for example, The Picturegoers [1960]). The theme recurs in later novels, through the childhood memories of certain characters (Paradise News, 1992; Therapy, 1995). The war is covered in Out of the Shelter (1970), while Ginger You're Barmy (1962) draws on Lodge's experience of military service in the 1950s. The Guardian review of the 2011 reissue of Ginger You're Barmy, called the novel "an impressively humane and feelingly political indictment of a tawdry postwar compromise" and "a moving glimpse of a world on the cusp of change".

Lodge was brought up a Catholic and described himself as an "agnostic Catholic". Many of his characters are Catholic and their Catholicism, particularly the relationship between Catholicism and sexuality, is a theme. The British Museum Is Falling Down (1965) and How Far Can You Go? (1980; published in the US as Souls and Bodies), examine the difficulties faced by orthodox Catholics due to the prohibition of artificial contraception. Other novels where Catholicism plays an important part include Small World (in the character of Persse), Paradise News (1991) and Therapy (1995). In Therapy, the protagonist Laurence Passmore ("Tubby") has a breakdown after his marriage fails. He reminisces about his adolescent courtship with his first girlfriend at a Catholic youth club and seeks her out while she is on a pilgrimage to Santiago de Compostela. Lodge has said that if read chronologically, his novels depict an orthodox Roman Catholic becoming "less and less so as time went on".

Several of Lodge's novels satirise the academic world. The Campus Trilogy (Changing Places, Small World and Nice Work) are set at a fictional English Midland university of "Rummidge", modelled on Birmingham. (The name "Rummidge" appears to be derived from Brummagem, the local nickname for Birmingham, by removing the first and last letters and altering the spelling.) The novels share characters, notably the Rummidge English literature lecturer Philip Swallow and his American counterpart, Professor Morris Zapp, who aspires to be "the highest paid Professor of English in the world". Swallow and Zapp first cross paths in Changing Places, where they swap jobs for an exchange scheme (and later, swap wives). Lodge has called the plot of the novel "a narrative transformation of the thematic material and the socio-cultural similarities and differences I had perceived between Birmingham and Berkeley", during his visiting professorship.

Other fictional universities appear in Lodge's novels. Persse McGarrigle in Small World is a doctoral student at a fictional University College Limerick, the book having been written before the foundation of a real University of Limerick. Another campus novel, Thinks..., is set in a fictional University of Gloucester, before the foundation of the University of Gloucestershire.

Lodge's novels cover the world of business in Nice Work, that of television in Therapy and deafness and Alzheimer's disease in Deaf Sentence. The last draws on Lodge's hearing problems, "I hate my deafness; it's a comic infirmity as opposed to blindness which is a tragic infirmity". Lodge has said of his work, "Each of my novels corresponds to a particular phase or aspect of my own life [but] this does not mean they are autobiographical in any simple, straightforward sense".

Two of Lodge's later novels follow the lives of authors, Author, Author (2004) about Henry James and A Man of Parts (2011) about H. G. Wells. Author, Author suffered from comparison with Colm Tóibín's novel about Henry James, The Master, published six months earlier and then shortlisted for the Booker Prize. Most reviews of Lodge's novel dwelt on its unfortunate timing. Lodge wrote about the experience in The Year of Henry James (2006).

In 2015, Quite a Good Time to Be Born was published, an autobiography covering Lodge's life from 1935 to 1975.

=== Influences and allusions ===
Lodge's influences include English Catholic novelists (the subject of his MA dissertation), notably Graham Greene. Of his contemporaries, he has been compared most often to his friend Malcolm Bradbury, also an exponent of the campus novel. Lodge has acknowledged this debt,

"The British Museum Is Falling Down" was the first of my novels that could be described as in any way experimental. Comedy, it seemed, offered a way of reconciling a contradiction, of which I had long been aware, between my critical admiration for the great modernist writers, and my creative practice, formed by the neo-realist, anti-modernist writing of the 1950s. My association with Malcolm Bradbury, and the example of his own work in comedy, was therefore a crucial factor in this development in my writing." Lodge said that he "was once rung up by a man to settle a bet by declaring whether I was the same person as Malcolm Bradbury".

As an academic, Lodge was an early British proponent of the work of Mikhail Bakhtin. Lodge also alludes frequently in his novels to other literary works. The British Museum Is Falling Down is influenced by Mrs Dalloway by Virginia Woolf and Ulysses by James Joyce in that all of the action takes place in a day. The novel is mostly seen from the point of view of Adam Appleby, but the last chapter contains a long stream-of-consciousness section from the point of view of Adam's wife Barbara, modelled on Molly Bloom's famous soliloquy at the end of Ulysses. The novel contains a number of other passages that parody well-known writers, a fact not recognised by most reviewers when it was first published.

Small World makes constant reference to Arthurian legend, in the plot, character names and allusions made by the characters (all academics). Lodge says of the novel's genesis,

It gradually grew on me that there was an analogy between my story and the Arthurian story, particularly the Grail quest in which a group of knights wander around the world, having adventures, pursuing ladies, love, and glory, jousting with each other, meeting rather coincidentally or unexpectedly, facing constant challenges and crises, and so on.... This all corresponded to the modern world with its Round Table of professors: the elite group who get invited to conferences, who go around the world in pursuit of glory. Sometimes they take the opportunity to indulge in amorous intrigue, or to joust with each other in debate, pursuing glory in the sense of wanting to be at the top of their profession.

=== Dissemination and reception ===
Lodge's work first came to wider notice in Britain in 1975, when he won the Hawthornden prize for Changing Places. He went on to win the Whitbread Book of the Year award in 1980 for How Far Can You Go? and the Sunday Express Book of the Year in 1988 for Nice Work. Two of his early novels were reissued during this period (Ginger You're Barmy, 1962/1982, and The British Museum is Falling Down, 1965/1981). His novels appeared in paperback in the 1960s with Pan and Panther Books, with Penguin Books from 1980 and with Vintage Publishing (Random House Group) since 2011. Vintage has reissued most of his earlier work. Lodge has been shortlisted for the Booker Prize twice, for Small World and Nice Work, and in 1989, Lodge chaired the Booker Prize judges. His 1970 novel Out of the Shelter was long-listed for the Lost Man Booker Prize in 2010. Anthony Burgess called Lodge "one of the best novelists of his generation".

==== International publication ====
Lodge's work first received recognition in France in the early 1990s, after the publication by Rivages of two of his novels, Nice Work and Changing Places. These were followed in 1991 by Small World and The British Museum Is Falling Down. Since then almost all his works of fiction have been translated – his new works fairly quickly. His present publisher in France is Payot et Rivages. His books are routinely translated into other languages, including Czech, Estonian, German, Italian, Japanese, Polish, Portuguese, Romanian, Russian, Spanish and Turkish.

=== Narrative techniques ===
In The Art of Fiction (1992), Lodge studied, through examination of extracts from novels, various stylistic devices (repetition, variation in levels of language, etc.) and narrative techniques (varying viewpoints, defamiliarisation, etc.). Lodge self-consciously uses many of these techniques in his own novels. For example, in Paradise News (1991) the narration is mostly third-person point of view, but there are also first-person narratives (diary and autobiography, letters, postcards, emails) and various other documents, such as theoretical writings on tourism. In Therapy (1995) the bulk of the novel is told through the protagonist's diary, but there are other texts, presented as written by minor characters about the main character. It is eventually revealed that these were all written by the main character, as part of a therapy exercise.

== Television ==
Two of Lodge's novels have been adapted into television serials: Small World (1988), and Nice Work (1989). Nice Work was adapted by Lodge himself and filmed at the University of Birmingham. He also adapted his play The Writing Game for television (1995). In 1994 Lodge adapted Dickens's Martin Chuzzlewit for a BBC series.

== Theatre ==
Lodge wrote three plays: The Writing Game, Home Truths (which he later turned into a novella), and Secret Thoughts (based on his novel Thinks...).

In his autobiography Quite a Good Time To Be Born: a Memoir, 1935–75 (2015), Lodge notes that The Old Rep was one of his favourite theatres, with a long distinguished history and the likes of Laurence Olivier, Edith Evans, Ralph Richardson, Albert Finney and Derek Jacobi performing there. He referred to the theatre as "a gem", but noted that shabby as it was then, he could not have had a better venue for his first attempt at writing for the professional stage.

The Writing Game is about the staff, teachers and students at a residential course for writers. The action is interspersed with readings by the characters of their own works in progress. According to Lodge, the play "originated in the experience of teaching such a course myself – not because its plot bears any resemblance to what happened on that course, but because it struck me that the bare situation possessed the classic dramatic unities of time, place and action. Indeed it would be true to say that I invented the plot of my play to fulfil the dramatic possibilities inherent in the situation." The play opened at the Birmingham Repertory Theatre on 13 May 1990 and ran for three weeks. An American production was staged at the American Repertory Theatre in Cambridge, Massachusetts in March 1991. Lodge later adapted the play for television. It was broadcast on Channel 4 on Sunday 18 February 1996, attracting 1.2 million viewers.

Home Truths was performed at the Birmingham Rep in 1998. The story mainly focuses on Adrian Ludlow, a semi-retired writer interviewed by Fanny Tarrant, a journalist famous for sarcastic portrayals. Lodge later rewrote it as a novella of the same name.

Lodge adapted his novel Thinks ... as a two-character play, Secret Thoughts, which opened at the Octagon Theatre, Bolton on 12 May 2011. The Stage called it "an intriguing, intensely witty, brainy play.... one of the most compelling two-handers imaginable". The Guardian's review said that "Lodge's novel boils down neatly into an intellectually and erotically charged dialogue on the nature of the mind", yet felt that "Lodge cannot quite eradicate the sense that some of the cerebral jousting has a more natural home in a novel than on stage." Secret Thoughts won Best New Play at the Manchester Theatre Awards, hailed as a "bracing and ambitious production that wowed everyone who saw it".

== Awards and recognition ==
Lodge's works were widely recognised with literary, and other national and international honours.

- Winner of the Hawthornden Prize and the Yorkshire Post Fiction Prize for Changing Places
- Elected Fellow of the Royal Society of Literature (FRSL) in 1976.
- Whitbread Book of the Year (1980) for How Far Can You Go?
- Shortlisted for the Booker Prize (1984) for Small World
- Shortlisted for the Booker Prize (1988) for Nice Work
- Winner of the Sunday Express Book of the Year award (1988) for Nice Work
- Regional winner and finalist for the Commonwealth Writers Prize (1996) for Therapy
- Appointed Commander of the Order of the British Empire (CBE) in the 1998 New Year Honours for services to literature.
- The television serialisation of Nice Work, which he adapted, won the Royal Television Society's Award for best Drama serial in 1989 and a Silver Nymph at the International Television Festival, Monte Carlo, 1990.
- Secret Thoughts, adapting his own novel Thinks..., won Best New Play award in the Manchester Theatre Awards at the Octagon Theatre, Bolton.

== Bibliography ==
Lodge's collected written works included books and essays of fiction, literary criticism, and autobiography, as well as a number of plays and screenplays.

=== Fiction ===
- The Picturegoers, 1960
- Ginger You're Barmy, 1962
- The British Museum Is Falling Down, 1965
- Out of the Shelter, 1970
- Changing Places: A Tale of Two Campuses, 1975
- How Far Can You Go? (US edition: Souls and Bodies), 1980
- Small World: An Academic Romance, 1984
- Nice Work, 1988
- Paradise News, 1991
- A David Lodge Trilogy, 1993 (The Campus Trilogy in later editions) — single volume comprising Changing Places, Small World and Nice Work
- Therapy, 1995
- The Man Who Wouldn't Get Up and Other Stories, 1998 — expanded edition with two additional stories, 2016
- Home Truths, 1999 (novella, written from original play)
- Thinks ..., 2001
- Author, Author, 2004
- Deaf Sentence, 2008
- A Man of Parts (H. G. Wells), 2011

=== Non-fiction ===
- Language of Fiction, 1966
- Graham Greene, 1966
- The Novelist at the Crossroads, 1971
- Evelyn Waugh, 1971
- Twentieth Century Literary Criticism, 1972
- The Modes of Modern Writing, 1977
- Working with Structuralism, 1981
- Write On, 1986
- After Bakhtin, 1990
- The Art of Fiction, 1992
- Modern Criticism and Theory: A Reader, 1992
- The Practice of Writing, 1997
- Consciousness and the Novel: Connected Essays, 2002
- The Year of Henry James: The Story of a Novel, 2006
- Lives in Writing, 2014

=== Autobiography ===
- Quite a Good Time To Be Born: a Memoir, 1935–75, 2015
- Writer's Luck: A Memoir: 1976–1991, 2018
- Varying Degrees of Success: A Memoir: 1992–2020, 2020

=== Theatre ===
- The Writing Game, 1990
- Home Truths, 1999
- Secret Thoughts (based on Thinks...), 2011

=== Adaptations for television ===
- Small World, 1988
- Nice Work, 1989
- Martin Chuzzlewit, 1994
- The Writing Game, 1995
