= List of fictional universities =

Many books and other works of fiction are set in, or refer to, fictional universities. These have been said to "feature abundantly, persistently, and increasingly in popular culture texts" and in an "array of media including novels, television, film, comic books, and video games". This list includes identifiable fictional universities or other institutions appearing to offer degree-level qualifications. Individual Oxbridge colleges (i.e. parts of the English universities of Oxford and Cambridge) are not included as there are separate lists of these.

University name	Creator	Original medium	Location	Comments
Alpine University	Silvio Horta	Film	US	An American University teaching film studies, in Urban Legends: Final Cut.
College of Art and Athletic Perfection	L. Frank Baum	Novel	Fantasy universe: Oz	Appears in Ozma of Oz and other books in the Oz series, sometimes with variations on the name (e.g., "Royal Athletic College"). It was founded by Professor Woggle-Bug.
Banting University	Degrassi: The Next Generation scriptwriters	TV	Canada	The prestigious, highly selective Banting University is located in Kingston, Ontario. It becomes a setting for Paige Michalchuk's storylines in season 6 of Degrassi: The Next Generation.
University of Bantshire	Anonymous	Internet	UK	Parody website and Twitter feed commenting on UK Higher Education, described as "the Banksy of the education social media world".
Barden University	Jason Moore and Kay Cannon	Film	US	University for the a cappella group the Barden Bellas and the Treblemakers in the Pitch Perfect franchise.
Bayfield University	Scott Lobdell	Film	US	Bayfield University, (Home of the Bayfield Babies), in New Orleans, Louisiana is the setting of the films Happy Death Day and Happy Death Day 2U.
Blackwell Academy	Life Is Strange creators	Video game	US: Arcadia Bay, Oregon	Fictional school in the Life Is Strange series, primary setting of the eponymous first game.
Borchester University	Various	Other	UK: England	Name used to disguise a university which was the subject of Angela Thody's 2012 study of emeritus professors. The University is also used as an example in a variety of teaching materials for language learning. Borchester is the fictional county town of fictional Borsetshire, in the English Midlands, scene of the long-running BBC Radio series The Archers.
Bugarup University	Terry Pratchett	Novel	Fantasy universe: Discworld	Located in the continent of XXXX, appearing in The Last Continent and mentioned in other books of the Discworld series.
The University of Bums on Seats	Cynicalbastards.com	Internet	UK: England	"Formerly Peckham Polytechnic". A satirical invention reflecting the changing UK Higher Education system, online since at least 2001.
Burston Central University	Chris Cooper (pseudonym)	Internet	UK: England	Also the associated "University College of North Burston". Not to be confused with "The University of Burston" (established 1863) in the same town. Setting of The Unknown Tutor, published in December 2012 in the "Wading Through Treacle" blog and later republished. Burston is 4 hours' drive from Prestatyn in north Wales, but otherwise unlocated.
University of Burston	Chris Cooper (pseudonym)	Internet	UK: England	Established 1863 and not to be confused with Burston Central University in the same town. Featured in The Unknown Tutor, published in December 2012 in the "Wading Through Treacle" blog and later republished.
California University Los Angeles (CULA)	Robert Luketic, Karen McCullah Lutz and Kirsten Smith	Film	US	Setting for the film Legally Blonde. Both the University of Southern California and Stanford University refused to allow the producers to use their college names in the film.
The University of California, Sunnydale	Joss Whedon	TV	US	University of California, Sunnydale, also referred to as UC Sunnydale or UC☼D is the hometown University for Buffy and her friends in the TV series Buffy the Vampire Slayer.
University of Carrbridge	Examiners in the Natural Sciences Tripos at the University of Cambridge	Other	UK: Scotland	Carrbridge is a village in the Scottish Highlands. The university and its Porterhouse College featured in statistics questions in Cambridge Natural Sciences Tripos examination papers at least from 2008 to 2011.
Cheng Dong University	In a Good Way scriptwriters	TV	Taiwan	Setting for the TV series In a Good Way.
Christminster University	Thomas Hardy	Novel	UK: England	Jude's destination in Jude the Obscure, based on Oxford.
Clyde University	Sea of Souls scriptwriter	TV	UK: Scotland	The Clyde is Glasgow's river. Clyde's Department of Parapsychology is the setting for this BBC TV series written by David Kane. Jordanhill College, Glasgow, was used to represent the university in exterior shots.
Dartmouth University	Sam Bain and Jesse Armstrong	TV	UK: England	The former university of main characters Mark and Jeremy in the Channel 4 sitcom Peep Show. Not to be confused with Dartmouth College.
University of Eastern Colorado	The Last of Us creators	Video game	US: Boulder, Colorado	After the apocalyptic outbreak of mutated Cordyceps, the university is used as a base to try to develop a vaccine. While based on Colorado State University, its appearance in the TV adaptation was filmed at Mount Royal University and the Southern Alberta Institute of Technology.
University of Edgestow	C. S. Lewis	Novel	UK: England	In the novel That Hideous Strength; had four colleges: Bracton College, Northumberland College, Dukes College, St. Elizabeth's College. Lewis described the fictional Edgestow as a small university town more beautiful than either Cambridge or Oxford.
Empire State University	Stan Lee and Steve Ditko	Comics, Film	US	Primary college setting for Peter Parker, used in multiple Spider-Man media, including Sam Raimi's Spider-Man Trilogy and Spider-Man: Brand New Day. No relation to the actual university of the same name.
Essex University	Mindy Kaling and Justin Noble	TV	US	Setting for the TV series The Sex Lives of College Girls.
Euphoric State University	David Lodge	Novel	US	Located in the fictional town of Plotinus in the fictional state of Euphoria, the employer of Morris Zapp who makes an academic exchange with Philip Swallow of Rummidge, England, in Changing Places.
Felpersham University	The Archers scriptwriters	Radio	UK: England	University in the fictional cathedral city of Felpersham in Borsetshire, attended by several characters from the long-running BBC radio series The Archers.
Fibchester University	National Union of Students	Other	UK: England	Subject of case studies in NUS training courses.
For-Profit Online University	Adult Swim	TV	None; it is an online university	A parody of online universities and the "commodifying (of) college." For example, students purchase facts from a digital marketplace instead of being taught them in classes.
University of Gallifrey	Doctor Who scriptwriters	TV	Extraterrestrial	Located on fictional planet Gallifrey, source of the Thirteenth Doctor's doctorate. Merchandise available on eBay and Etsy indicates that it was established in 1963 and known as "Time Lord Academy".
Globetrotter University	J. Stewart Burns	TV		Mentioned in the TV series Futurama.
University of Gloucester	David Lodge	Novel	UK: England	Setting of Thinks ... (ISBN 0-436-44502-6) Not to be confused with the real University of Gloucestershire.
Godolkin University	Craig Rosenberg, Evan Goldberg, and Eric Kripke	TV	US	Setting for the TV series Gen V, a spin-off of The Boys by Kripke.
University of Hilldene	Ruth Rendell	TV	UK: England	Alma mater of DI Burden's daughter Pat in The Ruth Rendell Mysteries episode The Mouse in the Corner; filmed at Southampton.
Hudson University	Dick Wolf and others	TV, comics	US: New York City	Features in Law & Order, also in Castle (2009-2016) and (located in the fictional city of New Carthage, NY) in 1969 Batman comic.
University of Inverdoon	Eric Linklater	Novel	UK: Scotland	The protagonist of Linklater's semi-autobiographical White Maa's Saga attends medical school at this Scottish university, either identified as University of Aberdeen or set in a town which is "a thinly veiled combination of Aberdeen and Inverness".
King's University, also known as King's College Dublin	Eilís Dillon	Novel	Ireland	Dublin based setting for novels including Death in the Quadrangle (Faber, 1956; republished 2009 ISBN 978-1601870445).
Kirke University	Campus scriptwriters	TV	UK: England	Setting for the semi-improvised sitcom Campus.
University College Limerick	David Lodge	Novel	Ireland	Employer of a character in Small World (ISBN 0-436-25663-0). Not to be confused with the real University of Limerick (previously the National Institute of Higher Education, Limerick but never University College Limerick).
Lowlands University	Andrew Davies	TV	UK: England	Setting for A Very Peculiar Practice. Possibly based on Warwick.
Ludlow College	Bill Lawrence and Matt Tarses	TV	US	Setting for the TV series Rooster.
Manchester Medlock University	Fresh Meat scriptwriters	TV	UK: England	Setting of TV comedy series Fresh Meat. The Medlock is a river in Greater Manchester.
Mars University	J. Stewart Burns	TV	Extraterrestrial: Mars	On the planet Mars; setting for an eponymous episode of TV series Futurama.
University of Maximegalon	Douglas Adams	Radio	Extraterrestrial	From the BBC Radio series The Hitchhiker's Guide to the Galaxy.
Miskatonic University	H. P. Lovecraft	Novel	US: Arkham, MA	Prestigious university in (fictional) Arkham, modelled after Brown and Harvard University. Part of Lovecraft's Cthulhu Mythos. Home to a vast library of arcane literature and occult books, such as the Necronomicon.
Monsters University	Dan Scanlon	Film		Setting for the eponymous film. "Founded in 1313 by Arthur Clawson", according to Disney's MU Fearbook; includes School of Scaring and School of Liberal Arts and Monstrosities.
University of Muri	Walter Benjamin and Gershom Sholem	Other	Switzerland/Germany	Fabrication of a university through various references and fake documents as an extended satire on academic procedures.
New Tammany College	John Barth	Novel	US	Setting of Giles Goat-Boy. A vast university variously serving as an allegory for the United States, the human world, the universe, and the Cold War. It is divided into a secretive and authoritarian East Campus (representing the Eastern Bloc) and a more open West Campus, ruled by a messianic Grand Tutor.
University of North Norfolk	Elly Griffiths	Novel	UK: England	The title character of Griffiths' Ruth Galloway series heads the department of forensic archaeology at this university near King's Lynn, Norfolk (which is not in North Norfolk local authority district).
University of North Yorkshire	Susan Parry	Novel	UK: England	Near Harrogate. Features in the novel Grand Depart (2013, Viridian Publishing, ISBN 978-0956789143) and other books by the same author, as the employer of central character Dr Millie Sanderson.
University of Norwich	Michael Frayn	Film	UK: England	In the 1986 film Clockwise, written by Frayn and directed by Christopher Morahan, headmaster Brian Stimpson (Cleese) sets off to deliver a speech at this fictional university Scenes depicting the university were filmed at King Edward's School, Birmingham and the University of Birmingham. Not to be confused with the real University of East Anglia established 1963 in Norwich, or the real Norwich University of the Arts which gained university status in 2013.
Oxbridge University	William Makepeace Thackeray	Novel	UK: England	Location of the St Boniface College attended by the eponymous hero of Thackeray's novel Pendennis. The Oxford English Dictionary defines Oxbridge as "Originally: A fictional university" and cites Thackeray as its earliest reference. The term is now more commonly used as a portmanteau term for the English universities of Oxford and Cambridge.
Pembroke University	Amanda Peet	TV	US	"In what seems like New England"; setting for Netflix series The Chair.
Pendle University	Elly Griffiths	Novel	UK: England	Employer of several characters and two murder victims in the Ruth Galloway series book Dying Fall. A "new university" based in Preston, Lancashire in a former cigarette factory. Not to be confused with Pendle College, a college of the University of Lancaster, or the University of Central Lancashire, the real "new university" in Preston, Lancashire. (The Borough of Pendle is known for Pendle Hill and the Pendle witches.)
Pendleton University	Silvio Horta	Film	US	The spooky New England University where folklore comes true in the film Urban Legend.
Pennbrook University	Boy Meets World scriptwriters	TV	US	Located in Philadelphia, Pennsylvania, Pennbrook University is the fictional institution of which the main characters of Boy Meets World attend beginning in season 5. The university becomes a main setting for the remainder of the series. It is believed to be based on Saint Joseph's University and the University of Pennsylvania.
Poltowan University	Nicola K. Smith	Novel	UK: England	Set in a fictional town somewhere west of Falmouth, Cornwall, this university is the setting for Smith's 2019 novel A Degree of Uncertainty (Compass, ISBN 978-1912009411) featuring tensions between students and residents.
Poppleton University	Laurie Taylor	Newspaper	UK: England	Nether Poppleton and Upper Poppleton are real villages just outside York. Used by the University of Leeds for mathematics examples. Also used by HESA as an example in official documentation.
Rummidge University	David Lodge	Novel	UK: England	Setting of the Campus Trilogy: Changing Places, Small World and Nice Work "A thinly-veiled portrait of Birmingham".
St Luke's University	Doctor Who scriptwriters	TV	UK: England	Fictional university in Bristol where the Twelfth Doctor taught and Bill Potts worked, first appearing in series 10, episode one The Pilot. Filming used the buildings of Cardiff University.
St Rule's University	Margaret Oliphant	Story	UK: Scotland	Setting of Oliphant's 1896 short story "The Library Window", based on University of St Andrews.
St Sebastian's University	Anonymous	Novel	UK: England	Setting of A Campus Conspiracy (ISBN 9780954758677), published anonymously in 2006 but attributed to Lavinia Cohn-Sherbok.
Scumbag College	The Young Ones scriptwriters	TV	UK: England	College attended (or not) by the four flat-sharing students in 1980s BBC TV series The Young Ones, written by Ben Elton, Rik Mayall and Lise Mayer. A highlight was the four's appearance as the college's team on TV quiz show University Challenge confronting Footlights College, Oxbridge.
Shanhe University	Netizens	Meme	China	A non-existent Chinese university with fair admissions policies, reasonable fees, great teaching and otherwise Utopian.
Shiz University	Gregory Maguire	Novel	Fantasy universe: Oz	Appears in The Wicked Years novels as well as stage and film adaptations. Students, including Galinda and Elphaba, study the magic arts.
Skerryvore University	James Bridie	Play	UK: Scotland	A Scottish university, the setting of Bridie's 1939 play What Say They?, which was adapted into the 1952 comedy film You're Only Young Twice. Skerryvore is an uninhabited island off the west of Scotland, 12 miles (19 km) beyond Tiree.
Smithdale University	Degrassi: The Next Generation scriptwriters	TV	Canada	The fictional university attended by several characters in Degrassi: The Next Generation. Based on and filmed at York University in Toronto, Ontario.
Stansfield University	Courtney A. Kemp	TV	US	The fictional university located in New York attended by Tariq St. Patrick in Power Book II: Ghost, part of the Power franchise.
Streeling University	Isaac Asimov	Novel	Extraterrestrial: Trantor	Workplace of Hari Seldon and the other psychohistorians, Isaac Asimov. Foundation.
Strixhaven university	Mark Rosewater, Wizards of the Coast design team	Trading card game	Fantasy universe: Multiverse of Magic: The Gathering	Setting of the Strixhaven: School of Mages and Secrets of Strixhaven expansion sets for the Magic: The Gathering trading card game, and their Strixhaven: A Curriculum of Chaos role-playing game adaptation for Dungeons & Dragons.
Sweet Valley University	Francine Pascal	Novel	US	Setting for 63 YA novels by Pascal and ghost-writers (published 1993-2000), part of the Sweet Valley High franchise.
University of American Samoa	Vince Gilligan and Peter Gould	TV	US: American Samoa	Fictional law school where Jimmy McGill earned his degree in Better Caul Saul.
University of Tayside	Traces scriptwriters	TV	UK: Scotland	Located in Dundee, Scotland, and hosts the Scottish Institute of Forensic Science and Anatomy (SIFA), the setting for the seriesTraces, made by Alibi and shown on BBC One. Filming locations include University of Bolton. Also branded as "Tayside University".
Toronto University	Degrassi: The Next Generation scriptwriters	TV	Canada	A fictional public university from the Canadian teen drama series Degrassi: The Next Generation. Based on the University of Toronto, this institution is where numerous Degrassi graduates attend for higher education. As its name suggests, it is located in Toronto, Ontario.
Tuktoyaktuk University	Anonymous	Clothing	Canada: NWT	A clothing manufacturer in the real Tuktoyaktuk, a hamlet in Canada's Northwest Territories, sold celebrated teeshirts and sweatshirts from this fictional institution.
Unseen University	Terry Pratchett	Novel	Fantasy universe: Discworld	In the city of Ankh-Morpork on Discworld.
Warren University	Mona Awad	Novel	US	Setting of Bunny. A small liberal arts college in New England with a MFA program known for its "experimental approach to narrative".
Watermouth University	Malcolm Bradbury	Novel	UK: England	Setting of The History Man; "bears more than a passing resemblance to the University of East Anglia"
Weissnichtwo University	Thomas Carlyle	Novel	Germany	This home institution of main character Professor Diogenes Teufelsdröckh is the backdrop of the ironic treatment of then contemporary German philosophical currents in the 1831 novel Sartor Resartus.
Wetherton University	Reginald Hill	TV	UK: England	The local university is mentioned in some episodes of Dalziel and Pascoe, the BBC TV series set in fictional Wetherton, Yorkshire.
Wetwang University	Yorkshire Post columnist?	Newspaper	UK: England	Wetwang is a village in the East Riding of Yorkshire.
Winchester University	Justin Simien	Film	US	The 2014 film Dear White People is set in this fictional Ivy League university. Not to be confused with the real University of Winchester in England.
Windsor College	Wes Craven and Kevin Williamson	Film	US	The setting of the 1997 film Scream 2.
Wrottesley Polytechnic	Howard Jacobson	Novel	UK: England	Sefton Goldberg, the central character of Jacobson's 1980 novel Coming From Behind, is an unhappy lecturer at this English polytechnic "somewhere in the debased and deteriorating Midlands". Inspired by Jacobson's experiences as a lecturer at Wolverhampton Polytechnic.
Ziggoreth University	Isaac Asimov	Novel	Extraterrestrial: Ziggoreth	In co-operative nephelometric research with Streeling University (q.v.). Issac Asimov. Foundation.

Note that the red brick university in England in which Kingsley Amis sets Lucky Jim is unnamed.

== See also ==
- List of fictional Cambridge colleges
- List of fictional Oxbridge colleges
- List of fictional Oxford colleges
- List of fictional schools
- Campus novel
