= List of fictional settlements =

This is a list of fictional settlements, including fictional towns, villages, and cities, organized by each city's medium. This list should include only well-referenced, notable examples of fictional towns, cities, settlements and villages that are integral to a work of fiction and substantively depicted therein. Fictional cities, towns and counties are arrows in the fiction writers' quivers – they lend an air of authenticity to the story, and since there are so many of them, readers find them to be a plausible addition that makes the story more realistic.

== Comics ==
Name	Debut	Creator(s)	Publisher	Notes
Basin City	Dark Horse Presents Fifth Anniversary Special (April 1991)	Frank Miller	Dark Horse Comics	A fictional town in the American west, almost universally called "Sin City". Founded as a mining town, the Roark family "imported" prostitutes to keep the miners happy, eventually making great profit both from the ore and "tourism". In the modern era, the town is governed by criminal organizations, most of them descendants of both the Roarks and the original prostitutes, Basin City becoming a dangerous red-light district.
Blüdhaven	Nightwing Vol 1 #1	Chuck Dixon, Scott McDaniel	DC Comics	A fictional American city located in New Jersey. A former whaling town, which was officially incorporated as a "Commonwealth" in 1912. The town had a generally poor socio-economic populace, owing in part to failed efforts to transform itself into a manufacturing and shipping center. In modern times, it became more dangerous than Gotham, ruled by gangs and a corrupt police department. Nightwing is the most common heroic presence.
Coast City	Showcase #22 (October 1959)	John Broome	DC Comics	
District X	New X-Men #127	Grant Morrison, John Paul Leon	Marvel Comics	A ghetto like neighbourhood of New York City, where most of the inhabitants are mutants. With the rise of Manhattan's mutant population coupled with racism among normal humans, mutants formed their own community in a ghetto established in or around Alphabet City, Manhattan. Middle East Side and Mutant Town are its other names. A series of explosions incinerated much of the neighborhood, with Arcade's force fields preventing fire fighters from entering the area until the entire district had been utterly annihilated. Now District X has been destroyed completely.
Duckburg	Walt Disney's Comics and Stories #49 (1944)	Carl Barks	Disney	Fictional city that appears in various Disney comic books and animated projects, located in the fictional state of Calisota. It is the home of Donald Duck, Scrooge McDuck, Huey, Dewey and Louie Duck, Daisy Duck, and most of their supporting cast. Various writers have given it a long and complex history; it was originally known as "Fort Drake Borough", a fort built in the 16th century by British explorer Sir Francis Drake. By the 19th century, the fort had been handed over by its departing British occupants to Cornelius Coot, who renamed the fort "Duckburg".
Gotham City	Batman #4 (Winter 1940)	Bob Kane, Bill Finger	DC Comics	A fictional American city that is the home of Batman, and the principal setting for all Batman comics, films, and other adaptations. Generally portrayed as a dark, crime-ridden locale, writer/artist Frank Miller has described Gotham City as New York City at night. Anton Furst's designs of Gotham for Tim Burton's Batman (1989) have been influential on subsequent portrayals: he set out to "make Gotham City the ugliest and bleakest metropolis imaginable."
Keystone City	Flash Comics #1 (January 1940)	Gardner Fox, Harry Lampert	DC Comics	
Metropolis	Action Comics #16 (Sept 1939)		DC Comics	A fictional American city that is the home of Superman, and along with Smallville, one of the principal settings for all Superman comics, films, and other adaptations.
Riverdale	Pep Comics #22 (Dec 1941)	Maurice Coyne, Louis Silberkleit, John L. Goldwater	Archie Comic Publications, Inc.	Riverdale is a fictional city that appears in the Archie Comics. Its exact location is unknown but it is presented to be a suburban town with parks, shopping malls, and restaurants. Publisher John L. Goldwater has said that the town is based on his own hometown of Hiawatha, Kansas, while Archie artist Bob Montana has said that it is based on his hometown of Haverhill, Massachusetts.
Smallville, Kansas	Superboy #2 (May 1949)		DC Comics	A fictional town in Kansas that is the hometown of Superman, where he landed on earth as an infant and was raised under an ordinary human identity in a small, idyllic farming community. Comics and adapted media that portray Superman's origin typically show his growing up in Smallville (such as Superman: The Movie (1978)), and the adult Superman also returns to visit. Smallville debuted in comics as the setting for Superboy (originally the identity of Superman as a youth, later made into a separate character) but was first mentioned in The Adventures of Superman radio show. The television series Smallville broadcast from 2001 to 2011.
Star City	Green Arrow	George Papp, Mort Weisinger	DC Comics	Home of the fictional vigilantes Green Arrow, Black Canary, Spartan, and Overwatch. They fight crime in this city.
Kamar-Taj	Strange Tales #110 (July 1963)	Stan Lee, Steve Ditko	Marvel Comics	A village hidden high in the Himalayas, where Doctor Strange learns magic from the Ancient One.
Fawcett City	Whiz Comics #2 (February 1940)		Fawcett Comics, DC Comics	

== Film ==
Name	Film	Distributor(s)	Notes
Chesterford, Massachusetts	211	Momentum Pictures	Chesterford is a fictional city located in Middlesex County, Massachusetts, with its own police department.
Derry, Maine	It	Warner Bros. Pictures	Derry is a fictional town created by Stephen King to serve as a nexus of horror in books such as It, Insomnia, The Tommyknockers and 11/22/63.
Hill Valley, California	Back to the Future	Universal	Hill Valley is a fictional town in California, located in the Sierra Nevada Mountains and 16 miles from Grass Valley.
Emerald City	The Wizard of Oz	MGM	The Emerald City is the fictional capital city of the Land of Oz based on L. Frank Baum's series of Oz books. It was first described in The Wonderful Wizard of Oz. The city is sometimes called the City of Emeralds due to its extensively green architecture.
Zion	The Matrix	Warner Brothers	Zion is a fictional city in The Matrix films. It is the last human city on the planet Earth after a cataclysmic nuclear war between humankind and sentient Machines, which resulted in artificial lifeforms dominating the world.
Mos Eisley	Star Wars	20th Century Fox	Mos Eisley is a setting in the fictional Star Wars universe. It is introduced as a spaceport town on the planet Tatooine which Obi-Wan Kenobi (played by Alec Guinness) describes as a "wretched hive of scum and villainy." It is the home of the Mos Eisley cantina and Figrin D'an and the Modal Nodes.
Coruscant	Star Wars	20th Century Fox	Coruscant is a fictional planet and city in the Star Wars universe. It has a population of about a trillion.
Stepford	The Stepford Wives	Fadsin Cinema Associates (1975), Paramount Pictures (2004)	Stepford, Connecticut is the setting in the Stepford Wives films and novel The Stepford Wives. Although the focus is on the wives, the fictional location is also worthy of note.
Toontown	Who Framed Roger Rabbit	Touchstone Pictures (1988)	Fictional town that borders Burbank, California, it is designed specifically to act as a home for Toons, and as a result, the laws of physics are subject to change within its borders, often making it hazardous for human visitors. Formerly owned by tycoon Marvin Acme, his death and apparent absence of a will triggers an ownership dispute that drives the main plot of the film.
Haddonfield, Illinois	Halloween	Independent Horror Film	Haddonfield, Illinois is the setting of serial killer Michael Myers' childhood and mass murder spree of Halloween 1978. The town name was named after Haddonfield, New Jersey, the hometown of the film's co-writer and producer Debra Hill. The town appears in all of the films in the franchise, except for Halloween H20.

== Television ==
Town Name	Origin	Network	Notes
Cabot Cove	Murder, She Wrote	CBS	Cabot Cove, Maine, is the small, fictional fishing village in which Jessica Fletcher lives in the television series Murder, She Wrote. Many episodes of Murder, She Wrote used Cabot Cove as a location because the show's producers were contractually obliged to deliver five Cabot Cove episodes a year. Despite the town's population of 3,560, Cabot Cove became notable as a place where a large number of murders took place. The New York Times calculated that almost 2% of Cabot Cove's residents died during the show's run. More visitors to Cabot Cove died than residents. Cabot Cove is named after the town's founder, Winfred Cabot. Perhaps setting the stage for the town's reputation for murders, Cabot was killed in a murder-suicide situation with his wife Hepzibah. It has an architectural heritage of Victorian houses. Given the village's rich history, coastal location and close proximity to eastern U.S. cities, Cabot Cove was transformed from a small, sleepy fishing village to a tourist destination for the people coming from New York City.
Hawkins, Indiana	Stranger Things	Netflix	
Lenora Hills, California	Stranger Things	Netflix	Lenora Hills is a fictional town in California that appeared in the fourth season of the show, the town was where the Byers and Eleven moved from Hawkins at the end of the third season.
Hazzard County, Georgia	The Dukes of Hazzard	CBS	Hazzard County is a fictional county in Georgia that was the setting for the 1980s television series The Dukes of Hazzard and its 2005 film of the same name.
Mayberry	Andy Griffith Show	CBS	Mayberry is a fictional community in North Carolina that was the setting for two American television sitcoms, The Andy Griffith Show and Mayberry R.F.D. Mayberry was also the setting for a 1986 reunion television movie titled Return to Mayberry. It is said to be based on Andy Griffith's hometown, Mount Airy, North Carolina.
Pawnee, Indiana	Parks and Recreation	NBC	Pawnee is a fictional town in the U.S. television show, Parks and Rec. It is said to be based on Muncie, Indiana. (Also fake town: Eagleton) It is also claimed that it is based on Evansville. It is claimed that Eagleton is based on Carmel.
Sunnydale, California	Buffy the Vampire Slayer	The WB	Sunnydale, California is the fictional setting for the U.S. television drama Buffy the Vampire Slayer. Series creator Joss Whedon conceived the town as a representation of a generic California city, as well as a narrative parody of the serene towns typical in traditional horror movies. Sunnydale is located on a "Hellmouth"; a portal "between this reality and the next", and convergence point of mystical energies.
Sparta, Mississippi	In the Heat of the Night	CBS, NBC	Sparta is a fictional town in Mississippi. It was filmed in Hammond, Indiana and also Covington, Georgia.
Mystic Falls	The Vampire Diaries	CW	Hometown to the main characters of the series. Founded in 1860 by a few founding families, the small town with a long history of supernatural creatures such as Vampires, Werewolves and Witches. Many important historical occurrences have taken place in Mystic Falls.
Lanford, IL	Roseanne	ABC	Lanford is the town that the show takes place in. (based in Elgin, IL)

== Radio ==
Town Name	Origin	Network	Notes
Ambridge	The Archers	BBC Radio 4	Village in the fictional county of Borsetshire, in the English Midlands. Possibly based on the village of Cutnall Green. Main setting of The Archers. Ambridge is twinned with the French settlement of Meyruelle, also fictional.
Borchester	The Archers	BBC Radio 4	County town of the fictional county of Borsetshire, in the English Midlands.
Felpersham	The Archers	BBC Radio 4	Town in the fictional county of Borsetshire, in the English Midlands.
Lake Wobegon	A Prairie Home Companion	Minnesota Public Radio	Lake Wobegon is the seat of Mist County, Minnesota, a tiny county near the geographic center of Minnesota that supposedly does not appear on maps because of the "incompetence of surveyors who mapped out the state in the 19th century".
Llareggub	Under Milk Wood	BBC Third Programme	Llareggub is a fictional fishing village in Wales. Possibly based on the seaside town of New Quay in Ceredigion. It is the setting of Under Milk Wood, a radio play commissioned by the BBC Third Programme from poet and playwright Dylan Thomas and first broadcast on 25 January 1954, less than three months after the poet's death in New York.
London Below	Neverwhere	BBC Radio 4	London Below is a fictional settlement, from Neil Gaiman's Neverwhere, adapted from a TV drama by the author for BBC Radio 4. London Below is a parallel world in and beneath the sewers of London Above. Its inhabitants are the homeless, but also people from other times such as Roman legionaries and mediaeval monks, as well as fictional and fantastical characters.
Meyruelle	The Archers	BBC Radio 4	Meyruelle is a fictional settlement in France, twinned with Ambridge, the setting of BBC Radio 4's soap opera The Archers.
Wistful Vista	Fibber McGee and Molly	NBC Red Network	Wistful Vista is a fictional community that is home to the McGees and their neighbors.

== Animated ==
Town Name	Origin	Network	Notes
Arlen, Texas	King of the Hill	Fox	Fictional mid-sized city located in Texas in the series of King of the Hill. It features a trailer park and a shopping mall, among other stuff. Arlen canonically has a population of 145,300 as according to the episode of Hank's Cowboy Movie.
Beach City	Steven Universe	Cartoon Network	Located in the fictional state of Delmarva, Beach City is the location of the headquarters of the Crystal Gems. Bill Dewey and Nanefua Pizza are both former mayors of the city. Notable locations include The Big Donut, Fish Stew Pizza, and Boardwalk Fries.
Bedrock	The Flintstones	ABC	Bedrock is the fictional prehistoric city, which is home to the characters of the animated television series, The Flintstones (1960).
Bikini Bottom	SpongeBob SquarePants	Nickelodeon	Bikini Bottom is a fictional city located underneath of the Pacific Ocean.
Clamburg	Making Fiends (web series) Making Fiends (TV series)	Nickelodeon	Fictional coastal city in an unknown sea which is a dangerous city and the delicious side of Clamburg is Clams. It is implied to be a fishing village that serves as a tourist destination.
Gravity Falls, Oregon	Gravity Falls	Disney Channel	Gravity Falls, Oregon, is the fictional setting for the 2012 series, Gravity Falls. It is believed to be a strange town with many mysteries waiting to be uncovered.
Highland, Texas	Beavis and Butt-Head	Comedy Central	Small to mid-sized city where the series Beavis and Butthead is located.
Iacon	Transformers (franchise)	Paramount+, Cartoon Network, The Hub/Discovery Family, and The CW's Vortexx block	Fictional city on the planet Cybertron. It is an Autobot-controlled city state in the planet's northern hemisphere.
Konohagakure	Naruto	Viz Media	Fictional village featured in the Naruto media franchise. It is a hidden village located in the Land of Fire. As the village of one of the Five Great Shinobi Countries, Konohagakure has a Kage as its leader known as the Hokage, of which there have been seven in its history.
Musutafu	My Hero Academia	Funimation	Fictional city in the My Hero Academia franchise where Izuku Midoriya and other characters live. It is located somewhere near Shizuoka Prefecture.
New Helic City	Zoids: Chaotic Century	JNN	
New New York City, New York	Futurama	Fox	New New York is the setting of the 1999 animated comedy Futurama, built above "'Old' New York." It is also the location of the headquarters of Planet Express.
Paradigm City	The Big O	Wowow	
Priestella	Re:Zero (TV series)	Crunchyroll	Capital city of the Dragon Kingdom of Lugunica.
Quahog, Rhode Island	Family Guy	Fox	Quahog, Rhode Island is a city which is the setting for the U.S. animated television sitcom Family Guy. A popular bar in the city is The Drunken Clam.
South Park, Colorado	South Park	CMDY	A fictional small town of South Park, located within the real life South Park basin in the Rocky Mountains of central Colorado. The town is also home to an assortment of frequent characters such as students, families, elementary school staff, and other various residents, who tend to regard South Park as a bland and quiet place to live.
Springfield	The Simpsons	FOX	Springfield is the fictional town in which the American animated sitcom The Simpsons is set. A mid-sized town in an undetermined state of the United States, Springfield acts as a complete universe in which characters can explore the issues faced by modern society. The geography of the town and its surroundings are flexible, changing to address whatever an episode's plot calls for. Springfield's location is impossible to determine; the show is deliberately evasive on the subject, providing contradictory clues and impossible information about an actual geographic location. The town was founded by Jebediah Springfield.
Townsville	Powerpuff Girls	Cartoon Network	Although it shares the same name as the Australian city, it does not appear to have any other connection to Townsville, Queensland.
West City	Dragon Ball	Funimation	Fictional city featured in the Dragon Ball franchise. It is a large megalopolis on Earth. Out of the 43 regions that the Earth is divided into, it is included in region 28.
Yoyle City	Battle for Dream Island	YouTube (web-series)	A mostly abandoned city featured in BFDIA and IDFB

== Literature ==
Town name	Author	Origin	Notes
Alicante	Cassandra Clare	The Mortal Instruments	This city is the home to all shadow hunters in The Mortal Instrument series. However, not all shadow hunters live in Alicante. They have to live across the world to protect humanity from demons, but Alicante is always in their hearts. (Not the city in Spain)
Amber	Roger Zelazny	The Chronicles of Amber	Amber is the true world of which our world, and many (perhaps infinitely many) others, are shadows; and also the name of the citadel that is its capital.
Ambergris	Jeff VanderMeer	City of Saints and Madmen	Ambergris is a fictional city featured in Jeff VanderMeer's works, starting with City of Saints and Madmen (2001) and continuing with Shriek: An Afterword (2006) and Finch (2009). It is named for "the most secret and valued part of the whale" and populated by humans after its original inhabitants—a race of mushroom-like humanoids known as "gray caps"—were violently driven underground. These creatures, though removed from the eccentricities of daily life in Ambergris, continue to cast a shadow over the city with their unexplained nocturnal activities.
Ankh-Morpork	Terry Pratchett	Discworld	Pratchett describes Ankh-Morpork as on the far side of corrupt and polluted, and as subject to outbreaks of comedic violence and brouhaha on a fairly regular basis. Ankh-Morpork is also the mercantile capital of the Discworld. As the series proceeds, Ankh-Morpork is more and more portrayed as multi-cultural (which in this case means multi-species, with increasingly prominent populations of creatures such as dwarves, trolls, vampires, gnomes, bogeymen, zombies and werewolves) and struggling with modern real-world challenges. Even when it is under attack from a dragon, the vegetable carts still have to come in. In The Art of Discworld, Pratchett explains that the city is similar to Tallinn and central Prague, but adds that it has elements of 18th-century London, 19th-century Seattle and modern New York City.
Brigadoon	Alan Jay Lerner	Brigadoon	Brigadoon is a fictional Scottish town and is the main subject of the Broadway musical of the same name. The town only appears in our world for one day every 100 years.
Castle Rock	Stephen King	various novels	Castle Rock, Maine is part of Stephen King's fictional Maine topography and provides the setting for a number of his novels, novellas, and short stories. Built similarly to the fictional towns of Jerusalem's Lot (featured in the novel 'Salem's Lot) and Derry (featured in the novels It, Insomnia, and Dreamcatcher), Castle Rock is a typical small New England town with many dark secrets.
Cittàgazze	Philip Pullman	The Subtle Knife	Cittàgazze (sometimes abbreviated to Ci'gazze), meaning "City of the Magpies" in Italian, is a fictional city within an unknown world (and parallel universe).
Clochemerle	Gabriel Chevallier	Clochemerle	Clochemerle is a fictional village in France, in a 1934 satirical novel of the same name by Gabriel Chevallier, inspired by Vaux-en-Beaujolais, a commune in the Beaujolais. The novel satirises the conflict between Catholics and republicans in the Third Republic. The story concerns a dispute over the construction of a vespasienne (public urinal) near the village church. The term Clochemerle has entered French as a term to describe "petty, parochial squabbling".
Hogsmeade	J.K. Rowling	Harry Potter series	Hogsmeade Village is the only settlement in Britain inhabited solely by magical beings, and is located to the northwest of Hogwarts School of Witchcraft and Wizardry. It was founded by medieval wizard Hengist of Woodcroft. Much of Hogsmeade's architecture reflects its medieval origin; the village is known for its leaning medieval houses. Hogsmeade primarily consists of a single thoroughfare, called High Street, on which most shops and other magical venues reside.
Idaville	Donald J. Sobol	Encyclopedia Brown	Idaville is a fictional American town in this YA series. It is also the setting of the stories in other media.
Jonathanland	Mason Ewing	Various stories	Jonathanland is the fictional city created by Mason Ewing, where several storylines unfold, including those of Baby Madison, Eli Tilmann and the pin-up Shelly Gold. It is located in California, not far from Los Angeles.
Kirrin Island	Enid Blyton	The Famous Five (novel series)	Kirrin Island is an island belonging George (one of the Famous Five characters, who was given the island by her parents). The island is frequented by the five adventurers.
Lake Wobegon	Garrison Keillor	A Prairie Home Companion	Lake Wobegon is a fictional lake and town in Minnesota. It is the setting for Garrison Keillor's segment "The News from Lake Wobegon" from the radio program A Prairie Home Companion as well Kellior's books Lake Wobegon Days (1985) and Leaving Home (1987). It is said to be located in the fictional Mist County in Central Minnesota presumably near St. Cloud. The town is based on the small-town life of various Minnesota lake communities, most notably Keillor's hometown of Anoka, Minnesota.
Lankhmar	Fritz Leiber	Fafhrd and the Gray Mouser	Lankhmar is a populous, labyrinthine city rife with corruption. It serves as the home of Leiber's two anti-heroes Fafhrd and the Gray Mouser. It also forms a Dungeons & Dragons campaign setting.
Malgudi	R. K. Narayan	Swami and Friends	A town in Ramanathapuram in South India in the novels and short stories of R. K. Narayan. All but one of his fifteen novels and most of his short stories take place here. The name is a portmanteau of two Bangalore localities, Malleshwaram and Basavanagudi.
Middlemarch	George Eliot	Middlemarch	Middlemarch is a fictional town in 19th century England circa 1832. It is the setting for George Eliot's 1872 novel. A small town in New Zealand bears the same name, possibly because the wife of a 19th-century surveyor was reading the novel at the time settlements were being catalogued.
Peterswood	Enid Blyton	Five Find-Outers	Peterswood is a city that appears in the story Five Find-Outers as the main setting in the fifteen mystery stories.
Rocky Beach	Robert Arthur Jr. (original writer).	Three Investigators	Rocky Beach is where the three investigators live.
Shangri-La	James Hilton	Lost Horizon	Shangri-La is a fictional place described in the 1933 novel Lost Horizon by British author James Hilton. Hilton describes Shangri-La as a mystical, harmonious valley, gently guided from a lamasery, enclosed in the western end of the Kunlun Mountains. Shangri-La has become synonymous with any earthly paradise, and particularly a mythical Himalayan utopia.
TKKG City	Rolf Kalmuczak behind a pseudonym "Stefan wolf"	TKKG	TKKG city is a metropolitan city. The city where TKKG lives. the setting for most of the stories.
Ulthar	H. P. Lovecraft	Various short stories	Ulthar is both a fictional town and a fictional deity. The town of Ulthar is part of H. P. Lovecraft's Dream Cycle, appearing in such stories as The Dream-Quest of Unknown Kadath (1926), The Cats of Ulthar (1920) and The Other Gods (1933).
Underhill	Kim Stanley Robinson (original writer).	Red Mars	This is the original settlement on Mars.

== Video games ==
Name	Debut	Notes
Alexandria	Final Fantasy IX	
Anvil	The Elder Scrolls IV: Oblivion	Capital of County Anvil in the Province of Cyrodiil.
Arcadia Bay, Oregon	Life Is Strange	Arcadia Bay is a small, fictional city at the coast of Oregon and the main setting of the videogames Life Is Strange and Life Is Strange: Before the Storm..
Bana City	Ace Combat 5: The Unsung War	A college town on the southern coast of the Federation of Osea, formerly serving as its capital. During the Circum-Pacific War, Yuktobanian terrorists released nerve gas across the city in retaliation for the terrorist attack on an engineering college in Dresdene.
Bayview	Need for Speed: Underground 2	A fictional seaside city located on the west coast region of the United States.
Blackwater, West Elizabeth	Red Dead Redemption	Blackwater is a small port town based on Blackwater, Missouri, and is the setting of the Blackwater Massacre in Red Dead Redemption 2. It is featured in Red Dead Redemption, Red Dead Redemption 2, and Red Dead Online.
Bravil	The Elder Scrolls IV: Oblivion	Capital of County Bravil in the Province of Cyrodiil.
Bright Falls, Washington	Alan Wake	Bright Falls is a fictional mountain town located in the U.S. state of Washington and is the setting of Alan Wake.
Bruma	The Elder Scrolls IV: Oblivion	Capital of County Bruma in the Province of Cyrodiil.
Bullworth, New England	Bully	A small town located somewhere within the New England region of the United States. Also the namesake of the primary location of the game, Bullworth Academy.
Capital City, U.S.	State of Emergency	Setting for State of Emergency and State of Emergency 2.
Carcer City, U.S.	Manhunt	Setting for Manhunt, Based on several Rust belt cities, primarily Cleveland and Detroit.
Catharsis, Arizona	Postal III	Catharsis is a desert town.
Cheydinhal	The Elder Scrolls IV: Oblivion	Capital of County Cheydinhal in the Province of Cyrodiil.
Chorrol	The Elder Scrolls IV: Oblivion	Capital of County Chorrol in the Province of Cyrodiil.
City 17	Half-Life 2	City 17 is the setting of the games Half-Life 2: Episode One and Half-Life 2: Episode Two. The city is located in Eastern Europe and is shown to be controlled by the interdimensional totalitarian regime known as The Combine.
Columbia	BioShock Infinite	Columbia is a floating city which was the part of the United States, and introduced to the world during the World's Columbian Exposition in 1893. Following an "international incident" where the city bombarded Peking during the Boxer Rebellion in response to American hostages being taken by the Boxers, the city seceded from the United States and became a theocratic/white nationalist dictatorship.
Cottonmouth, U.S.	Manhunt 2	Setting for Manhunt 2. Presumably located in the Gulf Coast, the city's design is mostly influenced by New Orleans and Atlanta.
Court of Fontaine	Genshin Impact	Capital city of the fictional nation of Fontaine.
Decent, Illinois	Tattletail	
Diamond City, Boston	Fallout 4	A post-apocalyptic settlement based in the ruins of Fenway Park in Boston, Massachusetts.
Directus	Ace Combat Zero: The Belkan War	Capital of the Republic of Ustio. At the start of the Belkan War, the city fell under Belkan control during their invasion of Ustio. The city was liberated by the Allied Forces two months later.
Dowon	InZOI	Fictional South Korean city based on Seoul.
Dunwall	Dishonored	Dunwall, the capital of Gristol and the Empire of the Isles, is an industrial whaling city situated on the Wrenhaven River. In the game it is shown to be ravaged by plague and controlled by an oppressive and technologically advanced government.
Edensin, Arizona	Postal 4: No Regerts	Edensin is a desert town, located near to the Mexican border.
Empire Bay, U.S.	Mafia II	Empire Bay is a city on the East Coast of the United States that serves as the setting for Mafia II. The city is based on New York City, Chicago, San Francisco, Los Angeles, Boston, and Detroit.
Empire City	Infamous	A fictional city presumably located in the Northeastern United States, heavily inspired by New York. During the events of Infamous it was ravaged by an event known as "the blast" and isolated from the continental United States.
Expo City	Ace Combat 3: Electrosphere	A city in eastern Usea. It is home to New Ark Airport, headquarters of the Universal Peace Enforcement Organization. During the Sotoa-Usea War in Ace Combat 8: Wings of Theve, orbital strikes from the Tonitrus Spear satellite and attacks from the land battleships destroy the city, including the UN Command Center and IUN peacekeeping institutions. By the events of Ace Combat 3: Electrosphere, it has been partially rebuilt.
Fairhaven	Need For Speed: Most Wanted (2012)	A fictional city located in the Northeastern United States, primarily based on Boston and Pittsburgh.
Farbanti	Ace Combat 04: Shattered Skies	Capital of Erusea. Part of its municipal district was flooded after being struck by Ulysses asteroid fragments. The city is captured by the Independent State Allied Forces as one of the last operations of the Continental War in Ace Combat 04: Shattered Skies. The city is captured again by Osea during the Lighthouse War in Ace Combat 7: Skies Unknown.
Fortune City, Nevada	Dead Rising 2	Fortune City, Nevada is a Las Vegas-themed adult amusement and entertainment resort, complete with casinos and hotels, which serves as the main setting in Dead Rising 2.
Foundation, West Virginia	Fallout 76	A fictional post-apocalyptic settlement located on Spruce Mountain. It is home to the Settlers, one of the two predominant factions in the game.
Freedom Town, USA	Fortnite Creative	Created to promote the Kamala Harris 2024 presidential campaign.
Gracemeria	Ace Combat 6: Fires of Liberation	Capital of the Republic of Emmeria. It is known for the King's Bridge, a suspension bridge that links the historic and modern districts of the city, and Gracemeria Castle, which holds culturally important items and the statue of the "Golden King." In the beginning of the Emmeria-Estovakia War, Estovakian forces invaded and took over the city, forcing the Emmerians to withdraw. When the Emmerian forces regained enough power, they returned and took back the capital. On the same day that a ceasefire agreement was made, Estovakia fired a large number of cruise missiles at the city; these missiles were intercepted before major damage was done.
Greenvale, Washington	Deadly Premonition	Greenvale is a town in Washington which is based on Twin Peaks.
Grestin	Papers, Please	Grestin is a city that was divided into two after a 6-year war between fictional countries of Kolechia and Arstotzka. In 1982, a border checkpoint opened in the center of the city, and it is the only pass to Arstotzka. It resembles post-war Berlin, which was divided by the Berlin Wall until 1990.
Harran	Dying Light	A small Middle Eastern city-state implied to be located somewhere within the Levant or Mesopotamia, the two major district within the game, the slums and the old town were the major setting for the game.
Hinamizawa, Japan	Higurashi When They Cry	A rural village in Japan based on the village of Shirakawa, Gifu, a World Heritage Site; it has a population of approximately 2,000. Hinamizawa appears to be a normal, peaceful, rural village; however, the tranquility abruptly ends after the annual Watanagashi Festival, a celebration to commemorate and give thanks to the local god, Oyashiro. Every year for the past four years, one person has been murdered, and another has gone missing on the evening of the Watanagashi Festival. The video game series and its related anime and manga present various scenarios from crazed locals to actual supernatural occurrences.
Hoffnung	Ace Combat Zero: The Belkan War	A major city in southeastern Belka, serving as a major arms-production center during the Belkan War. The city was decimated after a precision bombing strike led by the Allied Forces devolved into indiscriminate saturation bombing, causing the Belkans to execute a scorched earth policy. This attack resulted in many civilian casualties.
Hyrule Castle Town	The Legend of Zelda: Ocarina of Time	Castle Town is the city in front of Hyrule Castle in various games. There are many side-quests and mini-games offered that give you rewards like rupees (currency) and pieces of heart, the treasure required to extend your health bar.
Imperial City	The Elder Scrolls IV: Oblivion	Capital of the Empire of Tamriel, the largest city in Tamriel and primary city within Oblivion.
Inazuma City	Genshin Impact	Capital city of the fictional nation of Inazuma.
Inkopolis	Splatoon	
Kakariko Village	The Legend of Zelda: A Link to the Past	Kakariko Village (カカリコ村, Kakariko-mura) is a fictional village of The Legend of Zelda series that appears in A Link to the Past, Ocarina of Time, Four Swords Adventures, Twilight Princess, A Link Between Worlds, and Breath of the Wild. Kakariko is often portrayed as a prosperous small town.
Karnaca	Dishonored 2	Karnaca, also known as "The Jewel of the South at the Edge of the World", is the capital city of Serkonos, located in the eastern portion of the nation and at the southernmost tip of the Empire. It serves as the main setting of Dishonored 2, and is heavily inspired by the architecture and culture of Mediterranean Europe.
Kvatch	The Elder Scrolls IV: Oblivion	Capital of County Kvatch in the Province of Cyrodiil. The city is destroyed at the start of the game's main quest.
Lakeshore, Illinois	Need for Speed: Unbound	A fictional major city based on Chicago and its surrounding areas.
Las Venturas	Grand Theft Auto: San Andreas	One of the three accessible cities in the game, based on Las Vegas.
Lavender Town	Pokémon Red and Blue	Lavender Town (シオンタウン, Shion Taun; Shion Town) is a fictional village in the Kanto region of the Pokémon series. Stylized as a haunted location, Lavender Town is home to a large, indoor Japanese-style graveyard in a building called the Pokémon Tower. The town appears in Pokémon Red and Blue, Yellow, Gold and Silver, Crystal, FireRed and LeafGreen, HeartGold and SoulSilver, and Let's Go, Pikachu! and Let's Go, Eevee!.
Leyawiin	The Elder Scrolls IV: Oblivion	Capital of County Leyawiin in the Province of Cyrodiil.
Leyndell	Elden Ring	The capital of The Lands Between, which has fallen to ruins by the events of Elden Ring.
Liberty City, U.S.	Grand Theft Auto	Liberty City is a copy of New York City. It is shown in GTA I, GTA III, Liberty City Stories, Advance, Chinatown Wars and GTA IV. In all games, it is shown in the 1990s and 2000s. It is located in the Liberty state, and it is implied to be in proximity with Carcer City (appears in Manhunt and in some dialogues in another games of Grand Theft Auto). In GTA III and Liberty City Stories, the city is shown to only be loosely based on New York, while in GTA IV, the references to New York City are more explicit, featuring parodies of Times Square, the Empire State Building, and the Statue of Liberty.
Little Hope, Massachusetts	The Dark Pictures Anthology: Little Hope	Little Hope is a town in Massachusetts and the main setting of The Dark Pictures Anthology: Little Hope.
Little Lamplight	Fallout 3	A fictional post-apocalyptic settlement based in a network of caves in the Washington DC metropolitan area. The settlement is run entirely by children who exile their own once they hit puberty. In-game entries reveal the town was formed by schoolchildren on a field trip in 2077 when nuclear war occurred.
Liyue Harbor	Genshin Impact	Capital city of the fictional nation of Liyue, and largest port on the continent of Teyvat. It is primarily based on Chinese architecture.
Lost Heaven	Mafia	A fictional city located in the Midwestern United States in the 1930s. The city is heavily based on Chicago during the Prohibition Era.
Los Santos, San Andreas	Grand Theft Auto: San Andreas	Like its counterpart of Los Angeles, California, USA, Los Santos comprises several diverse areas. The urban area of Los Santos holds a population comparable to Los Angeles. Los Santos features several interpretations of many of Los Angeles' districts, landmarks, and neighborhoods, including Compton (Ganton), Willowbrook (Willowfield), Watts (Jefferson), Inglewood (Idlewood), East Los Angeles (East Los Santos), MacArthur Park (Glen Park), Downtown Los Angeles (Downtown Los Santos), Beverly Hills (Rodeo), Mulholland Drive (Mulholland), Santa Monica (Santa Maria), Venice Beach (Verona Beach), Hollywood (Vinewood) and its Hollywood Sign (Vinewood Sign). Los Santos is also part of the setting for Grand Theft Auto V. The new rendition of the city is now much more detailed, larger, and looks more alive than ever before. The city can be divided into four big sections: North, East, West and South Los Santos, in which beneath the sections, the streets are divided into districts. There are two incorporated cities in Los Santos: Davis, Del Perro. Los Santos has an estimated population of 4,000,000 and is the largest city in the State of San Andreas.
Los Sueños, California	Ready or Not	Los Sueños is a fictional city located in the United States. Los Sueños is based off the city of Los Angeles even though it is located in the area of real life San Diego. The city is in the events of Ready or Not experiencing a large crime wave as well as constant terror attacks, cult activity as well as government corruption. As of 2028 the city is experiencing widespread riots and collapse.
Los Perdidos, California	Dead Rising 3	A fictional major city located in Southern California. Described as a leading national center of business, culture, and the center of the entertainment industry. The city is primarily based and is a counterpart of the Greater Los Angeles metropolitan area in the Dead Rising universe.
Ludendorff, North Yankton	Grand Theft Auto V	A fictional town located in the fictional Midwestern state of North Yankton, based on North Dakota. The town's name, which is named after the German military leader Erich Ludendorff, alludes to Bismarck, the state capital of North Dakota, named after the German military leader and statesman Otto Von Bismarck.
Markarth	The Elder Scrolls V: Skyrim	Capital of The Reach, one of the nine holds of Skyrim.
Megafloat	Ace Combat 3: Electrosphere	A large seaborne city owned and operated by Neucom Incorporated. It is heavily militarized, with a base and staging area for air and naval forces.
Midgar	Final Fantasy VII	A fictional arcology controlled by the Shinra Corporation. It is shown to be divided between an artificial "upper layer" (an elevated platform covering the city) and an impoverished "lower layer".
Mondstadt	Genshin Impact	Capital of eponymous nation of Mondstadt. It is loosely based on central European architecture.
Nasha Town	Genshin Impact	Capital city of the autonamous region of Nod-Krai, which is part of the nation of Snezhnaya.
New Alexandria	Halo: Reach	
New Bordeaux, Louisiana	Mafia III	New Bordeaux is a city on the Gulf Coast of the United States that serves as the setting for Mafia III. The city is based on New Orleans as it existed in 1968.
New Donk City, Metro Kingdom	Super Mario Odyssey	Counterpart of New York City, this is the largest city in Metro Kingdom and is run by Pauline, current mayor of New Donk City and former love interest of Mario.
New Marais	Infamous 2	New Marais is a city presumably located in the Southern United States, based heavily off of post-Katrina New Orleans. It is shown to be partly controlled by a paramilitary group known only as "The Militia" and by a South African private security company called Vermaak 88.
New Mombasa	Halo 2	
New Reno	Fallout 2	A fictional settlement based in the post-apocalyptic ruins of Reno, Nevada.
New Vegas	Fallout: New Vegas	A fictional settlement based in the post-apocalyptic ruins of Las Vegas. The city is shown to be controlled partly by the reclusive businessman Mr. House, as well as by various gangs and outside factions such as the New California Republic and Caesar's Legion.
Night City	Cyberpunk 2077	A fictional city-state bordering a partitioned California that was founded in 1992, amidst widespread civil and social unrest that nearly brought the United States to the brink of total collapse. By 2077 it is shown to be run almost entirely by corporations, and suffers from high rates of crime and environmental degradation.
Olympic City	Need for Speed: Underground	A fictional city primarily based on Seattle.
Oured	Ace Combat 5: The Unsung War	Capital of the Federation of Osea. Bright Hill, the official residence and workplace of the president of Osea, is located here. In Ace Combat 5: The Unsung War, the Strategic Orbital Linear Gun is sent on a collision course with the city at the end of the Circum-Pacific War. The satellite is destroyed before it reaches the city. Later, during the Lighthouse War in Ace Combat 7: Skies Unknown, the rogue submarine Alicorn attempts to fire a neutron bomb at the city, but the projectile misses.
Pacific City	Crackdown	
Pallet Town	Pokémon Red and Blue	Pallet Town (マサラタウン, Masara Town) is a fictional town located in western region of Kanto in the Pokémon universe. It based on Machida, Tokyo, Satoshi Tajiri's hometown although its map location correlates better with some place in Shizuoka Prefecture. The town only has two entrances, north via Route 1 to Viridian City and Route 21 south accessible through water only.
Palm City, Florida	Need for Speed: Heat	A fictional city located in Florida, primarily based on Miami and its surrounding area.
Palmont City	Need For Speed: Carbon	A fictional city influenced by several major cities in the United States, particularly Los Angeles, San Diego, Las Vegas and San Francisco.
Paradise City	Burnout Paradise	A fictional city located somewhere within the eastern coast of the United States. Paradise City is divided into 5 districts, which make up two general areas of the landscape, the urban area and the rural area.
Paradise, Arizona	Postal 2	Paradise is a desert town in Postal 2. The population of the town is 4312.
Pelican Town	Stardew Valley	A small farming town in the region of Stardew Valley, and the primary setting of the game.
Possum Springs	Night in the Woods	A fictional dying coal-mining town in the Rust Belt region of the United States. The town used to have an underground rail system, but it is defunct and flooded in the game. The locals celebrate Halloween with their own festival, the Harfest. Its mines were a site of a massacre, a mining accident and hosted a cult centered around the entity known as the Black Goat.
Raccoon City	Resident Evil 2	Raccoon City is a town located in Arklay County in an unnamed state in Midwest United States. Originally the location of the headquarters and research facilities of the corrupt Umbrella Pharmaceuticals, it is the setting of many games in the Resident Evil franchise.
Rapture	BioShock	Rapture is a city in the bottom of the Atlantic Ocean somewhere between Greenland and Iceland. It is an Art Deco underwater city based on Objectivism founded by the wealthy entrepreneur Andrew Ryan in the late 1940s to escape the perceived constraints of the post-WW2 world. It eventually collapses due to civil unrest and mass genetic splicing in 1959.
Raven Brooks, Missouri	Hello Neighbor	Raven Brooks is a small American town in which the Hello Neighbor Franchise takes place.
Ravenholm	Half-Life 2	Ravenholm is a town in Eastern Europe in the game Half-Life 2.
Rhodes, Lemoyne	Red Dead Redemption 2	Rhodes, based on Dahlonega, GA is a town in the Scarlett Meadows region of the fictional state of Lemoyne in the Red Dead universe. The town was founded in the early 19th century by Brigadier General Sherman M. Rhodes, until 1899 the town was under the heavy influence of both the Braithwaite and Gray families until 1899. During 1899 an infamous gang of outlaws became responsible for the destruction of the Braithwaite family, the Gray family managed to survive but they were severely weakened and by 1907 their remaining influence over Rhodes had disappeared.
Riften	The Elder Scrolls V: Skyrim	Capital of The Rift, one of the nine holds of Skyrim.
Rivet City	Fallout 3	A post-apocalyptic settlement based on a former aircraft carrier docked on the irradiated Potomac River.
Rockay City, U.S.	Crime Boss: Rockay City	Rockay City itself is set in a Florida reminiscent of Miami Vice.
Rockwell, U.S.	Destroy All Humans!	Rockwell is the second area in Destroy All Humans!. It is a small, rural mid-western town.
Rockport	Need For Speed: Most Wanted (2005)	A fictional city presumably located in the pacific Northwest, primarily based on Seattle, Portland and Pittsburgh.
Saint Ark	Ace Combat 2	A port city in northeastern Usea. The Usean Rebel Forces took over the city during the Usean Coup, making it their interim capital city and establishing their central HQ there. Saint Ark was eventually liberated by the Usean Allied Forces; however, a submarine commandeered by the rebels launched a cruise missile at the city. The missile was intercepted before it reached Saint Ark. During the Ulysses Impact Event, an asteroid fragment struck the edge of the city, destroying its airbase and affecting civil defense capabilities.
Saint Denis, Lemoyne	Red Dead Redemption 2 and Red Dead Online	Saint Denis, based on New Orleans is a port city located in the Bayou Nwa region of the fictional state of Lemoyne, Saint Denis is also the state capital of the mentioned state in the Red Dead universe. The state of Lemoyne itself is based on Louisiana.
San Fierro	Grand Theft Auto: San Andreas	One of the three accessible cities in the game, based on San Francisco.
San Joshua Del Mosquiera, Mexico	Tom Clancy's Rainbow Six: Vegas	This small Mexican city, located on the US-Mexico border, functions as the headquarters of a terrorist cell led by Irena Morales, one of the main villains of Tom Clancy's Rainbow Six: Vegas.
San Salvacion	Ace Combat 04: Shattered Skies	Capital of San Salvacion. The city was occupied by the Federal Republic of Erusea following the refugee crisis caused by the Ulysses Impact Event, leading to the formation of the Independent State Allied Forces and the start of the Continental War. An underground resistance movement was formed by citizens of the city to provide intelligence to the ISAF. Eventually, San Salvacion was liberated by the ISAF after two years of occupation.
Santa Destroy, California	No More Heroes	The fictional city and home of protagonist Travis Touchdown. The town was inspired by seedy small towns in the United States.
Santo Ileso, U.S.	Saints Row	Santo Ileso is a fictional city and the setting of Saints Row reboot. The city is based on Las Vegas and Phoenix.
Sapienza	Hitman	An Italian town of which many of the scenarios for the 2016 video game are situated.
Seaside Town	Kingdom of Loathing	Seaside Town is the capital of the eponymous Kingdom of Loathing.
Selatapura	Ace Combat 7: Skies Unknown	A coastal city-state located on the Gunther Peninsula in southwestern Usea. It is highly developed and wealthy, most notably being connected by a bridge to the International Space Elevator, boosting the economy. During the Lighthouse War, numerous battles took place over the city for control of the Space Elevator.
Shady Sands	Fallout	The fictional capital of the New California Republic, a post-nuclear war successor state that claims to adhere to the democratic values of the old-world United States.
Shepherd's Glen, Maine	Silent Hill: Homecoming	Shepherd's Glen is a cursed town first featured in, and the main setting of, Silent Hill: Homecoming. Built along the shores of Toluca Lake within Toluca County, it is neighbored by the sleepy burg of Silent Hill, Maine.
Silent Hill. Maine	Silent Hill	Silent Hill is a fictional resort town in Maine, United States. It is the eponymous setting of all games in the Silent Hill franchise.
Silver Rock City	Need for Speed Payback	Silver Rock City is a fictional city in the United States of America. It is heavily inspired by the city of Las Vegas.
Skingrad	The Elder Scrolls IV: Oblivion	Capital of County Skingrad in the Province of Cyrodiil.
Solitude	The Elder Scrolls V: Skyrim	Capital of Haafingar Hold, one of the nine holds of Skyrim. Solitude serves as the capital of the Imperials, one of the two major factions in the game.
South Town	Fatal Fury	South Town is a fictional location in SNK's Fatal Fury, Art of Fighting and The King of Fighters series of video games. It is a coastal city located in the United States and is home of Terry Bogard and the nemesis Geese Howard. The city hosted The King of Fighters Tournaments before the NESTS saga blow up.
Splatsville	Splatoon 3	
Stadium of the Sacred Flame	Genshin Impact	Capital city of the fictional nation of Natlan.
Starlight Shores	The Sims 3: Showtime	Starlight Shores is described as The Sims version of Los Angeles, California including the fact that the city was founded by monks (Los Angeles was founded by the Franciscan order in 1771).
Starr Park	Brawl Stars	A fictional abandoned amusement park that serves as the home of all of the playable characters.
Station Square	Sonic Adventure	One of the main settings of Sonic Adventure. The city is flooded and destroyed by Perfect Chaos.
Steelport, U.S.	Saints Row: The Third	Steelport is the main setting of Saints Row: The Third, and Saints Row IV as Virtual Steelport. It is heavily based on various Northeastern Rust Belt cities in the US.
Stilwater, Michigan	Saints Row	Stilwater is a city located in Stilwater County, Michigan, the main setting of Saints Row, Saints Row 2, Saints Row Undercover, and Saints Row: Total Control. The city is modeled after Chicago, Detroit, Cleveland, and Baltimore.
Sumeru City	Genshin Impact	Capital city of the fictional nation of Sumeru.
Sunset City, U.S.	Sunset Overdrive	A dystopian, giant futuristic metropolis, located somewhere in the United States. An outbreak caused by the release of a contaminated drink known as the OverCharge Delirium XT, turned most of the city's population into grotesquely mutated humans simply known as OverCharge Drinkers, setting the story of the game.
Temple Gate, Arizona	Outlast 2	Temple Gate is a remote settlement in the Havasupai Indian Reservation in Northern Arizona, and the primary setting of Outlast 2.
Teufort, New Mexico	Team Fortress 2	Teufort is located in the Badlands, a fictional geographic region in New Mexico, and the primary setting of Team Fortress 2.
Tristram	Diablo	De facto capital of the Kingdom of Khanduras, and a major reoccurring location throughout the Diablo series.
Vault City	Fallout 2	
Tilted Towers	Fortnite: Battle Royale	Tilted Towers used to be the largest city in the game, until it was destroyed in a volcanic eruption in May 2019. Was replaced by a neo-futuristic city named Neo Tilted in Season 9, which in turn was replaced by the Old West-esque Tilted Town, and then by Gotham City in September. Was revealed on January 18, 2022, when it was revealed after the snow and ice melted away, but will be rebuilt to a restaurant-themed location after the battle between the Seven and the IO.
Vekta City	Killzone	
Valentine, New Hanover	Red Dead Redemption 2	Valentine is a hard-working livestock town located in the Heartlands of fictional U.S. State New Hanover in the game Red Dead Redemption 2.
Ventura Bay, California	Need for Speed (2015)	Located in Southern California, it is inspired by the most populous city in California, Los Angeles and is where all the racing in the game takes place.
Verdansk, Kastovia	Call of Duty: Modern Warfare (2019)	Verdansk was a city in the fictional country of Kastovia, an Eastern European country that was invaded by Al Qatala, the in game terrorist group. It is the main setting for Call of Duty: Warzone. In April 2021, Activision destroyed the city in a special event called "The destruction of Verdansk", which commemorated the end of the Modern Warfare Seasons. The city was reborn in the style of Call of Duty: Black Ops Cold War for the Cold War seasons of Warzone. The city was finally removed from public play when Call of Duty: Vanguard released. Caldera replaced Verdansk.
Vice City, Florida	Grand Theft Auto: Vice City	Vice City, as depicted in Grand Theft Auto: Vice City, is set in 1986. A reference to 1980s Miami, Vice City is specifically indicated to be located within the State of Florida, while Vice City was suggested to exist alongside Miami in Grand Theft Auto III. Vice City was also featured in the game Grand Theft Auto: Vice City Stories and will be featured in the game Grand Theft Auto VI. Unlike in previous installments, Vice City in GTA VI is set in the fictional, Floridaian-inspired state of Leonida, and will be set in the present day, and is implied to replace both the actual city of Miami and the actual State of Florida in the game's universe. Leonida itself borders the fictional State of Gloriana, inspired by the State of Georgia.
Villedor	Dying Light 2	Villedor is a city in an unknown European country, it is the setting for Dying Light 2.
Vivec City	The Elder Scrolls III: Morrowind	Largest city in Vvardenfell, and one of the principle cities of the province of Morrowind. The city is destroyed by the events of The Elder Scrolls V: Skyrim.
Wellington Wells	We Happy Few	
Willamette, Colorado	Dead Rising	Willamette, Colorado is the main setting of Dead Rising and Dead Rising 4, with the mall as its more specific location during the events of the first game.
Whiterun	The Elder Scrolls V: Skyrim	Capital of Whiterun Hold, one of the nine holds of Skyrim.
Whittleton Creek, Vermont	Hitman 2	Whittleton Creek is a fictional suburb in the United States of America, located in the state of Vermont. It is the home of several white collar professionals, such as University staff, government employees, and a former KGB spy.
Windhelm	The Elder Scrolls V: Skyrim	Capital of Eastmarch Hold, one of the nine holds of Skyrim. Windhelm serves as the capital of the Stormcloaks, one of the two major factions in the game. It is the oldest human settlement in Tamriel.
Wyndham, Cumberland	Atomfall	Fictional village in Cumberland near the Windscale Piles.
Yaughton, England	Everybody's Gone to the Rapture	Yaughton is a village in Shropshire.
Yharnam	Bloodborne	

== Other ==
Town Name	Origin	Notes
Azure City	The Order of the Stick	Fictional capital of a country of the same name, the setting for a large portion of the Webcomic The Order of the Stick.
Brigadoon	Brigadoon	Brigadoon is a village in the Scottish Highlands, the setting of the musical of the same name.
Chako Paul City	Chinese press agencies	A fictional town located in northern Sweden.
Cliffport	The Order of the Stick	
Esterford	CodeTorch and Formerley Scratch User EsterfordOfficial And Originally MonCurve38	Fictional City Loated in the Fictional British Esterfordian Territory, Which is an Island West of France, and is Connected to France By a Road Tunnel Built in the Late 1960s and a Rail Tunnel Built in the Late 1980s
Klugheim	Phantasialand	Fictional medieval town surrounded by basalt mountains that serves as a thematic area of the German theme park Phantasialand.
Nightvale	Welcome to Nightvale	
Sigil	Planescape	Fictional city located inside a ring hovering above the Spire, and the most popular locale in the setting. Nicknamed the City of Doors and The Cage, it contains portals to potentially every plane, dimension, and world in the Multiverse, and is inhabited by every race of Primes and Planars imaginable. Ruled by the enigmatic Lady of Pain.
Silver City	Phantasialand	Fictional American frontier town that served as a thematic area of the German theme park Phantasialand from 1974 to 2014 at the location of the modern-day thematic area Klugheim. It offered a saloon with shows and a dark ride, as well as shops and refreshments.
Waterdeep	Dungeons & Dragons	Fictional city-state that forms part of a popular Dungeons & Dragons fantasy role-playing game campaign setting called the Forgotten Realms. It is a port city that is located along the western coast of the Faerûn sub-continent. Known as the City of Splendors, Waterdeep is one of the largest and busiest cities—and one of the most important political powers—on the continent. The population is primarily human, although other races dwell therein.
Ypsilon	Pikkó herceg és Jutka Perzsi	A city, the capital of the fictional country of Gömböc in the first Hungarian opera.

== See also ==
- List of fictional universities
