= University of Gloucester =

University of Gloucester may refer to:

- University of Gloucestershire, Gloucester, England
- University of Gloucester, fictional university in England
