= Nelson Gabriel =

Character in BBC Radio 4 drama The Archers

- The Archers character
- Portrayed by: Jack May
- First appearance: 1952
- Last appearance: 1997
In-universe information
- Occupation: Wine bar owner Antiques dealer
- Father: Walter Gabriel
- Mother: Annie Gabriel
- Daughters: Rosemary Tarrant

Nelson Gabriel is a fictional character from the British BBC Radio 4 soap opera The Archers and was portrayed by Jack May.

== Casting ==
May was approached by producer Tony Shryane to join The Archers as Nelson in 1952. May remained with the show until he was forced to leave in January 1997 due to his declining health. He died later that year.

== Storylines ==
Nelson was the son of Walter Gabriel (Chris Gittins), the village carrier and self-appointed "character". He was charged with the Borchester mail-van robbery in 1967 but was eventually acquitted. After spells in London and Spain, in 1980, he ran a wine bar and later an antique shop with Kenton Archer. Finally, he disappeared to South America, where he died in strange circumstances.

== Reception ==
Listeners voted Nelson the "greatest rogue" in Archers history, while a writer for SOAP magazine named him one of the "10 Great Archers Characters". They said, "Son of the late, lamented Walter Gabriel whose eloquence and erudition cloak a shady past involving criminal activity and a suspicious absence of any love interest anywhere along the way, though he mysteriously acquired a daughter somewhere down the line."
