= Belo Vale =

- Municipality
- The Municipality of Belo Vale'
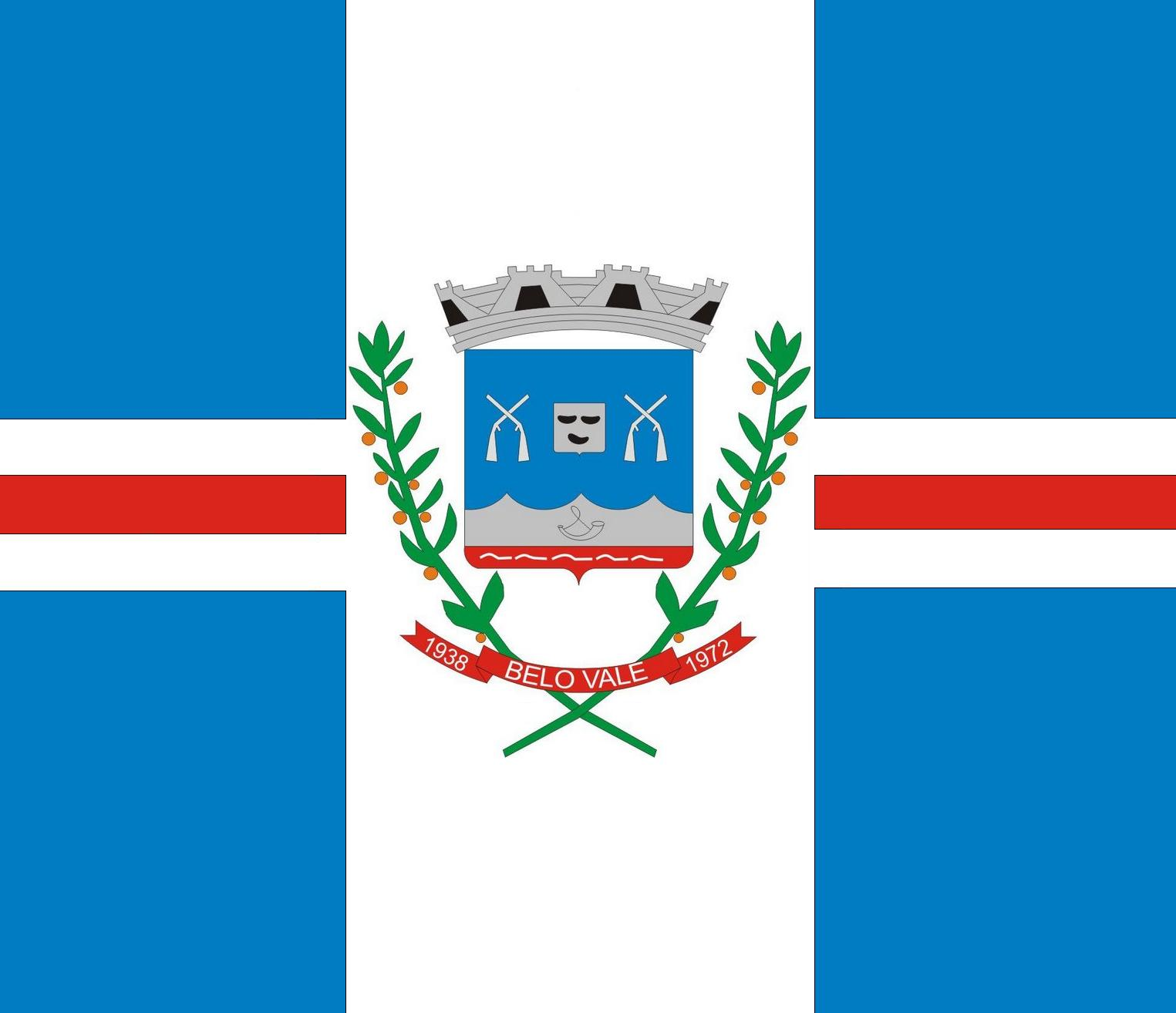
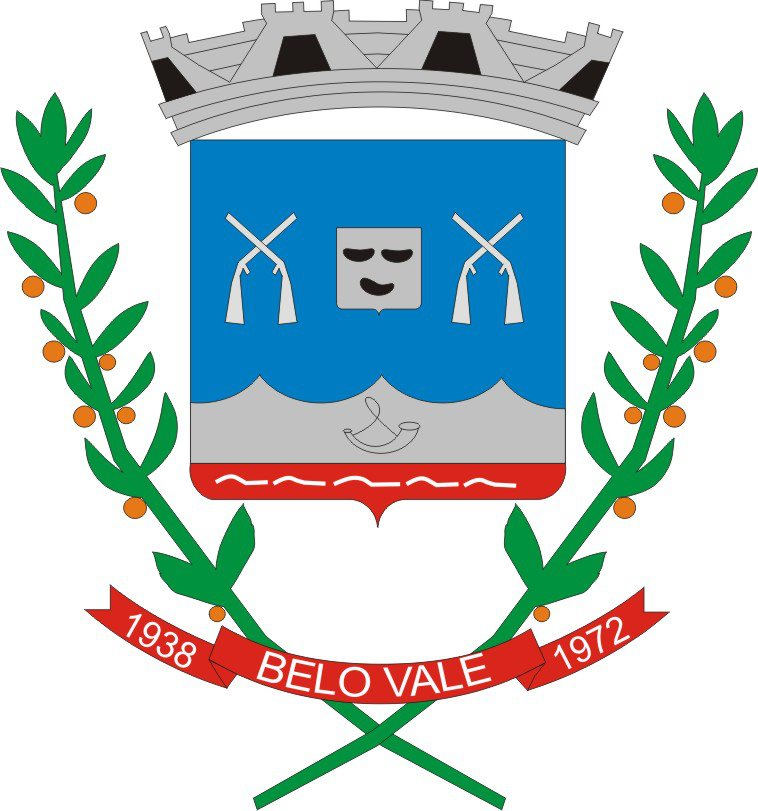
- Flag Coat of arms

- Location in Brazil
- Coordinates: 20°24′28″S 44°01′26″W
- Country: Brazil
- Region: Southeast
- State: Minas Gerais
- Founded: 1938
- Incorporated (as city): December 17, 1938

Government
  - Mayor: José Lapa dos Santos (PMDB)

Area
  - Municipality: 365 km^{2} (141 sq mi)
  - Urban: 5 km^{2} (1.9 sq mi)
- Elevation: 797 m (2,615 ft)

Population (2022 Census)
  - Municipality: 8,627
  - Estimate (2025): 9,012
  - Density: 211/km^{2} (550/sq mi)
- Belovalense
- Time zone: UTC−3 (BRT)
- Postal Code: 35473-000
- HDI (2000): 0.733 – high
- Website: Belo Vale, Minas Gerais

Belo Vale is a municipality in the state of Minas Gerais, Brazil. It is located 82 km south of Belo Horizonte, the state capital. The population was 9,012 inhabitants in 2025.

In 2014, a story about the village of Noiva do Cordeiro, situated within Belo Vale, was published by tabloids around the world. Among other things, these reports said that the population of Noiva do Cordeiro was entirely made up of single women, but this has been dismissed as a hoax by BBC Brazil.

== See also ==
- List of municipalities in Minas Gerais
- Chako Paul City
