= Borchester =

Fictional town in the fictional county of Borsetshire, England

Borchester is a fictional town in the BBC Radio 4 radio series The Archers. It is the county town of the fictional county of Borsetshire. According to series tradition it is located 6 miles north-east of Ambridge in the Am Vale and is a historic market and wool town. These typically English country-town features are complemented by more modern additions, such as Underwoods (an upmarket department store), Jaxx bar, which was previously a café both managed by Kenton Archer, and Ambridge Organics, the shop run by Helen Archer, who also makes the Borsetshire Blue cheese sold in Underwoods.

== Location ==
As The Archers is usually taken to "exist" in a region centred on Evesham and somewhere not too far from the Malvern Hills and the edge of the Cotswolds, Borchester could be connected to Broadway, Tewkesbury or Pershore. Hints in the series about the range of shops, local features and road layout, as well as distances sometimes given between Borchester, Felpersham and Ambridge, tend to point to Pershore as the most likely analogy, if we assume that Felpersham = Evesham. Another school of thought has Felpersham as Worcester and Borchester as Droitwich Spa. This view is supported by the existence of a Bishop of Felpersham - Evesham does not have a Bishopric whereas Worcester does. (At one time Bishop Cyril of Felpersham was an occasional character.)

Although it is a county town, it is not a city. The nearby Felpersham, which might be based on Evesham, is the seat of a Church of England diocese and does have the city status that usually goes with it. Borchester has a by-pass, built with much controversy during the 1980s. Evesham and Droitwich Spa both have by-passes but not Pershore.

The BBC published a map of Borchester in the 1990s, which, across a north-south axis common to both towns, was a 'cut and paste' of Evesham west of the axis and Great Malvern to the east. A property company named Borchester Land has featured in the storyline for many years.

== Facilities ==
Borchester is the location of the magistrates court for the area. Phil Archer served as a magistrate there for many years. In 1968, Nelson Gabriel, son of Walter Gabriel of Ambridge and a notorious rogue, was committed for trial and remanded in Gloucester prison at the Borchester magistrates. He returned many years later to run a wine bar in the town from 1980 to 1984. Also in Borchester is Borchester General Hospital.

Borchester is the scene of frequent shopping trips and social encounters in the series. It has a mixture of trendy, "southern England" features such as wine bars and upmarket delis combined with some working-class neighbourhoods. The Grundy family lived for a while in a substandard council flat in Borchester after being evicted from Grange Farm in 2000.

Borchester College, formerly Borchester Tech, is a Further education college offering both A-Level courses and vocational courses including management, hairdressing, and agricultural subjects. In 2002 it also offered evening classes in Italian. Several characters in the series have studied at Borchester College, and one, Russ Jones, taught there.
