= Bunny (novel) =

2019 novel by Mona Awad

- Author: Mona Awad
- Language: English
- Series: Bunny
- Genre: Gothic, satire
- Publisher: Hamish Hamilton
- Publication date: June 11, 2019
- Publication place: Canada
- Media type: Print (hardcover)
- Pages: 305
- ISBN: 9780735235885
- LC Class: PS3601.W35 B86 2019
- Followed by: We Love You, Bunny

Bunny is a black comedy campus novel by Mona Awad, published in Canada in 2019 by Hamish Hamilton. The story follows Samantha, a creative writing student at a prestigious New England university who is slowly drawn into a tight-knit quartet of friends nicknamed "the Bunnies". It is the author's second novel, published three years after her first book, 13 Ways of Looking at a Fat Girl. The film rights were optioned by Bad Robot Productions.

A sequel, titled We Love You, Bunny, was published on September 23, 2025.

== Plot ==
Samantha Mackey is a scholarship student attending at the small, liberal arts, Warren University in New England, and is in her second and final year of her Master of Fine Arts (MFA) Creative Writing program. Samantha is sardonic and aloof, having few friends besides intermittent exchanges with Jonah, another MFA student who specializes in poetry. The idyllic university grounds feature a lake with a swan, and the grounds are overrun by rabbits. After the end of a tumultuous romantic relationship with her thesis advisor 'the Lion', Samantha sits alone on a bench watching the lone swan. There, she meets Ava, an art school dropout, and they quickly become close friends as both despise the performative and pretentious platitudes of students and staff of the university. A particular object of their derision are the four other students in Samantha’s Creative Writing class known as the Bunnies, a rich, hyperfeminine clique who are physically affectionate, saccharine, and are fond of eating miniature versions of food. Samantha nicknames them Cupcake, Creepy Doll, Vignette, and the Duchess, who is the leader of the group.

At the start of the term, Samantha receives an invitation to the 'Smut Salon', an exclusive creative gathering or 'Workshop' organized by the Bunnies where they critique each other's work. She is unable to resist the invitation and attends the Workshop held at the house of one of the Bunnies, which involves drugs and the apparent ritual capture and sacrifice of a bunny rabbit, which creates a man-shaped creature that the Bunnies name 'drafts', 'darlings', or 'hybrids' who are based on the Bunnies' fantasies. The Darlings are often malformed with intellectual or physical deformities, and are dispatched with axes when the Bunnies tire of them. While Samantha continues to dislike the Bunnies, she is slowly subsumed into their group and habits which pushes Ava away.

Before another Workshop where it is Samantha's turn to lead the ritual, she sees a deer outside the Bunnies' house. Her attempt to create a Darling fails, and her bunny hops away. Afterwards, Max, a mysterious dark-haired man, appears in her life and begins a romantic relationship with Ava, further straining their friendship. Despite this, Max is friendly towards Samantha, knowing her dislike of the Bunnies, and later sabotages the Bunnies' work so that they perform badly during their writing workshop with their instructor Fosco. When Samantha returns to her room, she finds Max along with a dead swan with an ax in its back. It is implied that Ava is Samantha's creation, similar to the Darlings that the Bunnies create. Samantha first thinks that Max killed Ava before realizing that the Duchess did it. Max takes the ax and leaves the house while Samantha follows him.

They arrive at the Duchess's house, and Samantha sees the Bunnies wearing Ava's fishnet veil, mesh gloves, and black dress. She takes the ax and enters the house, accusing the Bunnies of Ava's killing which they deny. In turn, they blame her for forgetting to kill her Darlings and being unable to tell the difference between reality and illusion. When the Bunnies see Max outside the window, they mistake him for their respective Darlings and rush outside to greet and embrace him. Max sinks to his knees and bares his throat to Samantha. Despite the Bunnies' pleas, Samantha strikes the ax at his neck. Max turns into a stag who kicks away the Bunnies before it walks away into the trees.

Samantha graduates from Warren University along with the Bunnies, who all have injuries including broken limbs and shattered ribs that they claim result from a book arts accident. After the ceremony, the Lion approaches her and praises her thesis, however Samantha is impassive. She returns to the lake, where she watches a swan. Jonah finds her and engages in friendly conversation, and Samantha asks if he would like to go home with her.

== Characters ==
- Samantha: the self-conscious protagonist and narrator
- Ava: an art school dropout who likes cigarettes, has platinum-white hair and heterochromatic eyes
- Eleanor ('The Duchess'): leader of the Bunnies, has long silver hair, writes on glass panes
- Kira ('Creepy Doll'): one of the Bunnies, has amber eyes, writes fairy tales, nicknamed for looking like a creepy doll
- Victoria ('Vignette'): one of the Bunnies, has gray eyes, previously a ballerina, nicknamed for writing existential vignettes of princess and feral women,
- Caroline ('Cupcake'): one of the Bunnies, blonde, wears a pearl necklace, nicknamed for dressing and looking like a cupcake
- Max: a tall man with dark hair and smoky eyes in a black trench coat who becomes Ava's lover
- Ursula: the Creative Writing program instructor that Samantha nicknames 'Fosco' after The Woman in White, while the Bunnies christen her 'KareKare'
- The Lion: A professor and Samantha's thesis advisor who had a romantic relationship with her that he ended
- Jonah: A poetry student in the writing program and recovering drug addict

== Critical reception ==
Bunny was on lists of the best books of 2019 by TIME, Vogue, Electric Literature, and New York Public Library. In The Washington Post, Ann Bauer wrote, “Awad is a stone-cold genius line by line”, with the caveat that book relies on multiple genres, “Fairy tale. Horror. Satire. Metafiction. Each cleverly layered into Bunny, with cheeky references to Carrie, Heathers, Greek myths and Disney princess flicks. It can be a bit much.”

The Los Angeles Times review dwells on the scenes where The Bunnies try to secure Samantha's collaboration on a project which they describe as "experimental", "performance based", "intertextual" and finally settle on "a hybrid", which Samantha thinks is "What you call something when you just don't know what you're doing anymore." The reviewer continues, "The scenes in which Samantha and her classmates discuss their respective projects will be darkly familiar to anyone who's had to endure a creative writing workshop filled with gleefully pretentious would-be auteurs."

Margaret Atwood, author of the classic dystopian novel The Handmaid's Tale, described Bunny as a form of Gothic satire, "very funny, kind of horrifying and quite far outside the lines".
