= Changing Places =

1975 novel by David Lodge

- First edition
- Author: David Lodge
- Genre: Campus novel
- Publisher: Secker & Warburg
- Publication date: 1975
- Publication place: United Kingdom
- Media type: Print (hardcover, paperback)
- Followed by: Small World: An Academic Romance

Changing Places is a campus novel by British writer and academic David Lodge, published by Secker and Warburg in 1975. The subtitle is "A Tale of Two Campuses", and thus a literary allusion to Charles Dickens' A Tale of Two Cities. The other novels in what came to be referred to as The Campus Trilogy are Small World (1984) and Nice Work (1988), in which several of the same characters reappear. In the year of its publication, Changing Places was winner of the Hawthornden Prize and The Yorkshire Post Fiction Prize.

== Synopsis ==
Changing Places is a comic novel with serious undercurrents. It tells the story of a six-month academic exchange between fictional universities in the English industrial city of Rummidge, and Plotinus, in the fictional US state of Euphoria. The two academics taking part in the exchange are both aged 40, but appear at first to otherwise have little in common, mainly because of the differing academic systems of their native countries.

The English participant, Philip Swallow, is a conventional and conformist academic without a publication to his name and somewhat in awe of the American way of life. By contrast, his counterpart, Morris Zapp, is a top-ranking American professor whose only motive for going to the unprestigious Rummidge is that his wife agrees to postpone long-threatened divorce proceedings on condition that he moves out of the marital home for six months. Zapp is at first both contemptuous of, and amused by, what he perceives as the amateurism of British academe and horrified by the local weather after the Pacific Climate of his home state.

As the exchange progresses, Swallow and Zapp find that they begin to fit in surprisingly well with their new environments. Zapp, used to the radicalism of Plotinus students, quickly sorts out the student unrest at Rummidge and almost becomes the stand-in for the geriatric head of the English Department. Swallow, through the accident of a brief imprisonment, becomes a spokesperson for the students at Plotinus. In the course of the story, too, each man has a brief affair with the other's wife. Before that, Swallow has slept with Melanie, Zapp's daughter by a previous wife, without realising who she is. Eventually Melanie takes up with a former undergraduate student of Swallow's, Charles Boon.

By the end, Swallow and Zapp even consider remaining permanently where they are. In the novel's last section, the two couples convene in a New York hotel room to decide their future. The novel ends without a clear-cut decision, though the sequel, Small World: An Academic Romance, reveals that Swallow and Zapp returned to their home countries and domestic situations.

== Structure ==
Changing Places has been described as "More a caricature of academic life than a satire of it", in contradistinction to Lucky Jim, with which Lodge's novel has often been compared. In his introduction to the combined publication of his Campus Trilogy, David Lodge writes that the treatment of his American material in this novel was based in part on his time as visiting Associate Lecturer at the University of California, Berkeley in the first six months of 1969, although because of the changes since then he later came to regard the novel as "something of a period piece". In the novel, Berkeley becomes the punning "Euphoric State University", sited near the maritime city of "Esseph" (in reference to San Francisco). The fictional Rummidge also has its English counterpart, the name deriving from Brummagem, the term once used by its inhabitants for the city of Birmingham, where Lodge was currently a university lecturer.

In the same introduction, Lodge admitted to becoming wary, in the process of writing, of creating too perfect a symmetry between the situations of the divided couples (Maurice Zapp and Hilary Swallow, Philip Swallow and Desirée Zapp). He therefore decided to disguise this by adopting different narrative devices for the different named sections of the novel. The third section therefore becomes an exchange of letters between the characters ("Corresponding"); the fourth assembles quotations from published documents ("Reading"); the fifth compiles retrospective narratives ("Changing"); and the sixth is laid out as a film script ("Ending").

There are also references that recur throughout the novel, which provide occasions for metafictional academic humour. One of these is the 1927 manual Let's Write A Novel, which lies languishing on a shelf in Swallow's office until he asks for it to be sent him as an aid for the writing class that he is required to supervise at Euphoria State. It is in fact based on E. M. Forster's Aspects of the Novel, and one of the buried references to it is in the transposed initials of its fictional author (A. J. Beamish), which approximate in symmetry those of the parodied text's real author: E. M. F. as against A. J. B. Hilary Sparrow comments on one passage from this book that lists the epistolary novel as among the various kinds of fiction, that "surely nobody's done that since the eighteenth century?" This occurs in the "Writing" section that does indeed consist of a twentieth-century exchange of letters among the novel's four main characters. Again, the writing manual categorises endings for novels and advances the opinion that of the three possible kinds (the happy, the unhappy and the indeterminate), the third "doesn't really end at all". This prepares the reader for the film script ending of the final chapter where, in the middle of a conversation in which a comparison is made between the endings of novels and of films, it breaks off indeterminately in mid-frame.
