= Chako Paul City =

Fictional town in Sweden with exclusively female residents

Chako Paul City (or Shakebao) is a fictional town of 25,000 exclusively female residents located in northern Sweden, reports of which surfaced in Chinese press agencies Xinhua and Harbin News in 2009. It was founded in 1820 by a wealthy, man-hating widow. Men are banned from entering the town and most of its desperate, sex-starved inhabitants have turned to lesbianism. Immediately following the reports, millions of Chinese men swamped Swedish tourist companies with requests for information about it.

Claes Bertilson, spokesperson for Sweden's Association of Local Authorities and Regions, said: “At 25,000 residents, the town would be one of the largest in northern Sweden, and I find it hard to believe that you could keep something like that a secret for more than 150 years.”

== See also ==
- Noiva do Cordeiro
