= Rummidge =

Fictional city in David Lodge novels

Rummidge is a fictional city used by David Lodge in some of his novels, particularly Changing Places, Small World: An Academic Romance, and Nice Work. It is based on the English city of Birmingham, colloquially known as Brummagem, and the University of Rummidge is based on the University of Birmingham, where Lodge taught English literature for decades.

In an author's note before Nice Work, Lodge says, "Perhaps I should explain, for the benefit of readers who have not been here before, that Rummidge is an imaginary city, with imaginary universities and imaginary factories, inhabited by imaginary people, which occupies, for the purposes of fiction, the space where Birmingham is to be found on maps of the so-called real world."
