= Small World: An Academic Romance =

1984 book by David Lodge

- First edition
- Author: David Lodge
- Cover artist: Wendy Edelson
- Genre: Campus novel
- Publisher: Secker & Warburg
- Publication date: 1984
- Publication place: United Kingdom
- Media type: Print (Hardcover, Paperback)
- Pages: 339 pp (hardcover)
- ISBN: 0-436-25663-0
- OCLC: 10513214
- LC Class: PR6062.O36 S64x 1984
- Preceded by: Changing Places
- Followed by: Nice Work

Small World: An Academic Romance (1984) is a campus novel by the British writer David Lodge. It is the second book of Lodge's "Campus Trilogy", after Changing Places (1975) and before Nice Work (1988).

Small World uses the main characters (Professors Philip Swallow and Morris Zapp and their wives) from Changing Places and adds many new ones. It follows them around the international circuit of academic literary conferences. It is highly, and self-reflexively, allusive to quests for the Holy Grail, especially to Edmund Spenser's The Faerie Queene, as well as to studies such as Inescapable Romance by Patricia Parker. Characters discuss the romance and aspects of that genre in a way that comments directly on the action in the book. Siegfried Mews has discussed the novel's inherent analysis of the purpose of literary studies. Small World was shortlisted for the Booker Prize.

== Summary ==
The book begins in April 1979 at a small academic conference at the University of Rummidge. It is the first conference that Persse McGarrigle (a reference to Percival the grail knight), an innocent young Irishman who recently completed his master's thesis on T. S. Eliot, has attended. He teaches at the fictional University College, Limerick, after having been mistakenly interviewed because the administration sent the interview invitation to him instead of someone else with the same last name. Several important characters are introduced: Rummidge professor Philip Swallow, American professor Morris Zapp (inspired by the literary critic Stanley Fish), retired Cambridge professor Sybil Maiden, and the beautiful Angelica Pabst, with whom McGarrigle falls immediately in love. Much of the rest of the book is his quest to find and win her. Angelica tells Persse that she was adopted by an executive at KLM, Hermann Pabst, after she was found, abandoned, in the washroom of an aeroplane in flight. Persse professes his love for her, but she leaves the conference without telling him where she has gone.

Morris Zapp and Philip Swallow, who are seeing each other for the first time in ten years after the events of Changing Places, have a long evening talk. Since the previous novel, Swallow has become a professor and head of the English Department. Zapp has discovered deconstructionism and reinvented himself academically. Swallow tells Zapp about an incident a few years before, when after almost dying in a plane crash he spent the night at a British Council official's home and slept with the official's wife, Joy. Soon after, Swallow read in the newspaper that Joy, the official, and their son had died in a plane crash.

Part II of the book begins by going around the world, time zone to time zone, showing what different characters are doing all at the same time: Morris Zapp travelling; Australian Rodney Wainright trying to write a conference paper; Zapp's ex-wife Désirée trying to write a novel; Howard Ringbaum trying to persuade his wife Thelma to have sex with him on an aeroplane so he can join the Mile High Club; Siegfried von Turpitz talking to Arthur Kingfisher about the new UNESCO chair of literary criticism; Rudyard Parkinson plotting to get that chair; Turkish Akbil Borak reading William Hazlitt to prepare for a visit by Swallow; Akira Sakazaki translating English novelist Ronald Frobisher into Japanese; Ronald Frobisher having breakfast; Italian Fulvia Morgana (a reference to Morgan le Fay) meeting Morris Zapp on a plane; and more, in an interlocking series of plot coincidences and uses of character stereotypes.

Cheryl Summerbee is also introduced. She is a check-in clerk for British Airways at Heathrow and plays a small but very important role in helping, or hindering, other characters as they travel around the world. She loves reading romance novels, especially the kind published by "Bills and Moon" (a fictionalised Mills & Boon).

People continue to move around from conference to conference around the world in Part III. Persse continues to pursue Angelica. At a meeting in Amsterdam, Persse hears the German literary scholar Siegfried von Turpitz speaking about ideas that he submitted in an unpublished book, and all but accuses von Turpitz of plagiarism. Zapp rises to defend Persse from von Turpitz. Later, Persse sees someone who looks like Angelica, and thinks she has appeared in pornographic movies and worked as a stripper. In Turkey, Phillip Swallow meets Joy, the woman he thought was dead. She explains that only her husband had been on the plane that crashed. They begin an affair, and Swallow plans to leave his wife.

Events and characters move along in Part IV, often with direct reference to the genre of romance. Zapp is kidnapped by an underground left-wing movement, but is later released after pressure from Morgana. Persse, who has won an award and got a credit card, has enough money to continue to chase Angelica but never manages to catch up with her. She does leave him a clue referencing The Faerie Queene and he discovers that she has an identical twin, Lily, who made the pornographic movies.

When Persse meets Cheryl Summerbee again, she is now reading not romance novels but romances such as Orlando Furioso and critics such as Northrop Frye after Angelica has passed through her line. Persse is happy to learn this, but Cheryl is shaken to see that Persse is infatuated with Angelica, because she loves him herself. Persse continues to chase Angelica around the world, to conferences in Hawaii, Tokyo, and Hong Kong, and Jerusalem, but he never catches up with her. At that Jerusalem conference, Philip Swallow is with Joy, but after he sees his son there he becomes psychosomatically ill, which people think might be Legionnaires' Disease in a moment of panic. This stops the conference, and leads to the end of Philip and Joy's affair.

Part V takes place at the Modern Language Association conference in New York at the end of 1979. Most of the academic characters in the book are there. Arthur Kingfisher, an important (but physically and intellectually impotent) literary theorist (named in direct reference to Arthurian legend and the Fisher King), oversees a panel discussion, with the fate of the UNESCO chair at stake, about criticism where Swallow, Zapp, Morgana, and others present their opinions on what literary criticism is. Zapp's kidnapping experience has cured him of his interest in deconstructionism. Persse is then inspired to ask the panel, "What follows if everyone agrees with you?" The question catches Kingfisher's interest, and leads to his intellectual re-awakening, and subsequent recovery from his mental and physical impotence.

Persse finally finds Angelica and hears her read a paper about romances that directly reflects the structure of Small World itself:

"No sooner is one crisis in the fortunes of the hero averted than a new one presents itself; no sooner has one mystery been solved than another is raised; no sooner has one adventure been concluded than another begins... The greatest and most characteristic romances are often unfinished – they end only with the author's exhaustion, as a woman's capacity for orgasm is limited only by her physical stamina. Romance is a multiple orgasm."

After this talk, Persse sees Sybil Maiden, and tells her that Angelica is one of the twins that Sybil had found in the washroom of a KLM plane in 1954, which causes Sybil Maiden to faint. Angelica has left the hall in the interim, but Persse runs through the hotel and sees a woman he takes to be Angelica, kisses her and declares that he loves her. She takes him up to her hotel room where they make love, in Persse's first sexual experience. However, after this encounter, she reveals that she is not Angelica, but the twin sister, Lily. Persse feels ashamed, but Lily convinces him that he was "in love with a dream".

Later in the evening, Arthur Kingfisher announces that he will offer himself as a candidate for the UNESCO chair, to the disappointment of the other candidates. Right afterwards, Sybil Maiden surprises everyone with the announcement that she is Angelica and Lily's mother (the mother of the twins found on the KLM plane in 1954). Moreover, Kingfisher is their father. The revelation throws the entire meeting into a joyous uproar, where various conflicts (Parkinson and Frobisher, the Zapps) are reconciled. Angelica introduces Persse to her fiancé, Peter McGarrigle, the person whose job Persse was interviewed for back in Ireland. However, Peter is not angry, because as a result, he went to America and there met Angelica. Swallow has returned to his wife, saying "Basically I failed in the role of a romantic hero."

All of the narrative threads of the novel wrap up but for one: Persse realises that Cheryl Summerbee, not Angelica, is the woman for him, and he flies to Heathrow to see her. He arrives at the airport on New Year's Eve, but learns that Cheryl no longer works there, having been fired the day before Persse arrives. The new attendant tells Persse that Cheryl wanted to travel anyway at some point, and took this as her chance. No one knows where she has gone. The novel ends with Persse wondering "where in the small, narrow world he should begin to look for her."

== Adaptations ==
Granada Television presented a television adaptation of the novel for British television in 1988.
