= Nice Work =

Book by David Lodge

- First edition
- Author: David Lodge
- Cover artist: Paul Cox
- Language: English
- Genre: Campus novel, industrial novel
- Publisher: Secker & Warburg
- Publication date: 1988
- Publication place: United Kingdom
- Media type: Print (Hardback, Paperback)
- Pages: 277 pp (hardcover)
- ISBN: 0-436-25667-3
- OCLC: 18778725
- Dewey Decimal: 823/.914 20
- LC Class: PR6062.O36 N5 1988
- Preceded by: Small World: An Academic Romance

Nice Work is a 1988 novel by British author David Lodge. It is the final volume of Lodge's "Campus Trilogy", after Changing Places (1975) and Small World: An Academic Romance (1984). Nice Work won the Sunday Express Book of the Year award in 1988 and was also shortlisted for the Booker Prize.

The larger socioeconomic background to the novel was the economic policies and education cuts during the Thatcher government. Lodge was inspired, in part, by his experiences of shadowing a friend who supervised an engineering firm.

The year following its publication, the book was adapted in a four-part TV series for the BBC.

== Plot summary ==
Set in 1986, in the fictional city of Rummidge (based on Birmingham), the book describes the relationship between Robyn Penrose, a feminist university teacher specialising in the industrial novel and women's writing and Vic Wilcox, the manager of J. Pringle & Sons Casting & General Engineering ("Pringle's"). Robyn is a temporary lecturer at Rummidge, where her boss is Professor Philip Swallow. Swallow is head of the English Department but is also Dean of Rummidge's Arts Faculty. Robyn has the temporary lectureship at Rummidge because of the time demands of Swallow's new administrative responsibilities.

As part of the "Industry Year Shadow Scheme", the university is required to send one of its faculty members into a local factory. Robyn is selected and the chosen factory is Pringle's, where Robyn is to shadow Vic Wilcox and observe the inner workings of a real-life foundry, which she has never seen.

The novel also traces the separate private lives of Robyn and Vic. In the Wilcox family are Vic, his father, his wife Marjorie and his children. Separately, Robyn goes through various stages of her long-standing relationship with her boyfriend, Charles, a fellow literary scholar. Later in the novel, to Robyn's discomfort, after she has completed her time at Pringle's, the shadow scheme reverses, with Vic shadowing her during her teaching at Rummidge. The philosophical conflict between the ideologies of industry and academe come to the fore. Later, away from Vic, Professor Morris Zapp, a friend of Swallow's from the fictional American university Euphoric State (based on UC Berkeley), and a character from the earlier two novels in the Campus Trilogy, pays a brief visit to Rummidge on his way to a conference. He learns about Robyn's work for the first time and is impressed. Zapp tries to arrange for Robyn to have a job interview at Euphoric State for an open faculty position, to run interference against his ex-wife, whom Euphoric State's faculty is trying to recruit for the post. The uncertainty in Robyn's professional status comes from whether she will be able to find a permanent post anywhere, in the context of national budget reductions to the universities.

The relationship between Robyn and Vic reveals their weaknesses. Robyn's academic position is precarious because of national budget cuts to education and the universities. Vic has to deal with industrial politics at Pringle's. The plot is a pastiche of the industrial novel genre, alluding to North and South by Elizabeth Gaskell. This gentle ribbing acts to undermine the postmodern and feminist position of Robyn, who accepts the hand of fate despite ridiculing its role as the sole restorative capable (in the minds of authors of industrial novels) of elevating the female to a serious social position. Robyn acquires insight into the pragmatic ethos whose encroachment on university culture she resents and about the physical reality of factories of which her only prior knowledge was literature. In his turn, Vic learns to appreciate the symbolic or semiotic dimension of his environment and discovers a romanticism within himself that he had previously despised in his everyday life.

== Adaptation ==
In 1989, the BBC broadcast a four-part TV miniseries based on the novel, with a screenplay by Lodge. Directed by Christopher Menaul, the series featured Haydn Gwynne as Robyn Penrose and Warren Clarke as Vic Wilcox. The University of Birmingham served as the filming location of many of the scenes from this series. The series won the 1989 Royal Television Society award for best drama series.
