= Mona Awad =

Canadian novelist and short-story writer

- Awad in 2026
- Born: August 22, 1978 (age 48); Montreal, Quebec
- Education: York University; University of Edinburgh; Brown University; University of Denver
- Occupation: Author
- Writing career
- Notable works: 13 Ways of Looking at a Fat Girl; Bunny; All's Well; Rouge

Mona Awad (born August 22, 1978) is a Canadian novelist and short story writer known for works of darkly comic fiction.

Awad's debut novel, 13 Ways of Looking at a Fat Girl, was shortlisted for the Giller Prize and received the Amazon.ca First Novel Award. Her second novel, Bunny, was a finalist for the Goodreads Choice Award for Best Horror and New England Book Award. Her third novel, All's Well, was likewise a finalist for the Goodreads Choice Award for Best Horror, and so was her fourth novel, Rouge.

She has worked as an assistant professor at Syracuse University since 2020.

== Biography ==
Awad was born on August 22, 1978, in Montreal, Quebec. Her father, an Egyptian Muslim, immigrated to Canada in the 1970s. Her mother is a French-Canadian Catholic of Serbian and Irish descent. Awad's parents met in Montreal.

Awad moved to Mississauga, Ontario, when she was 13. There, she attended Father Michael Goetz Secondary School. Awad studied English literature at York University, earning a Bachelor of Arts from the university in 2004. She went on to earn a masters in English at the University of Edinburgh, an MFA at Brown University, and a PhD at the University of Denver.

She has lived in the United States since 2009, currently based in Boston, Massachusetts and Syracuse, New York, where she is the Esther M. Larsen Faculty Fellow in the Humanities and Assistant Professor at Syracuse University.

== Work ==
Awad's short fiction and non-fiction writing has been published in magazines including McSweeney's, The Walrus, Joyland, Post Road, St. Petersburg Review, and Maisonneuve. When Awad began writing as a columnist for Maisonneuve, she used the pseudonym Veronica Tartley. In 2017, Awad's short story "Woman Causes Avalanche" was published by the L.A. Review of Books. She has stated that she hopes her stories provide readers with "a sense of connection" so that "people [may] feel less alone."

Her debut book, 13 Ways of Looking at a Fat Girl, a novel (structured using linked short stories) about a woman's lifelong struggle with body image issues, won the Amazon.ca First Novel Award and was shortlisted for the Scotiabank Giller Prize in 2016. She was inspired to write the book because of her experiences growing up and struggling with her own body image. In the Los Angeles Times, Awad has been quoted as saying she "made [music] playlists for every chapter" in 13 Ways of Looking at a Fat Girl because it helped her "immerse" herself in the story and better "access it."

Her second book, Bunny, was published in June 2019 by Hamish Hamilton. Bunny tells the story of a girl named Samantha Heather Mackey who attends a prestigious graduate writing program located in New England, at the fictional Warren University. There, Samantha finds herself entangled in strange rituals led by the "Bunnies" — her fellow students who are more than just the clique that they seem on the surface. The novel was optioned for film by Bad Robot Productions in 2023.

Her third novel, All's Well, was released on August 3, 2021, by Simon & Schuster.

Awad's fourth novel, Rouge, was released on September 12, 2023, by Simon & Schuster.

Author Margaret Atwood has praised Awad's writing.

We Love You, Bunny was shortlisted for the 2025 Giller Prize.

== Bibliography ==
- 13 Ways of Looking at a Fat Girl. Penguin Books. 2016. ISBN 9780143128489.
- Bunny. Hamish Hamilton. 2019. ISBN 9780735235885.
- All's Well. Simon & Schuster. 2021. ISBN 9781982169664.
- Rouge. Simon & Schuster. 2023. ISBN 978-1982169695.
- We Love You, Bunny. Simon & Schuster. 2025. ISBN 978-1398535152.
