= Borsetshire =

Fictional county in English

Borsetshire is a fictional county in the BBC Radio 4 series The Archers. Its county town is the equally fictional Borchester. The county is supposedly set between Worcestershire and Warwickshire, but is also intended as a generic West Midlands rural county. Its name also echoes Anthony Trollope's fictional Barsetshire and the real Dorsetshire.

== Geography ==
Other places in the county include Ambridge, where The Archers is mainly set, Lower Loxley, a nearby village and Felpersham, a cathedral city which appears to be larger than Borchester. Ambridge is on the B3980 six miles south of Borchester and seventeen miles west of Felpersham. Ambridge lies in the valley of the River Am below Lakey Hill from which the (real-life) Malvern Hills may be seen in fine weather.

Felpersham is probably the largest settlement in the fictional county of Borsetshire. Felpersham is known to be the seat of a Church of England diocese, a university, and department stores. Unlike the county town, Borchester, Felpersham has city status. In having a cathedral but not being the county town it can perhaps be compared to Lichfield or St Albans.

The BBC map of Borsetshire shows most road numbers beginning with "1", which would place it in East Anglia, although some roads begin with "4" (appropriate to its apparent location in the West Midlands), "3", which would place it in the West Country, and even "9", which would place it in north-east Scotland. Fictional rivers in the county include the River Mercer, the River Perch and the River Am. There is also a fictional Felpersham Canal. There are railway stations at Felpersham, and at Hollerton Junction (nearer to Ambridge).

== Miscellanea ==
The Borchester Echo is the local newspaper published at Borchester. Radio Borsetshire is a local radio station. Borsetshire Blue is the name of a fictional cheese made by Helen Archer in the programme.
